= 2013 Diamond League =

2013 IAAF Diamond League
- Edition: 4th
- Dates: 10 May–6 September
- Events: 32
- Meetings: 14

The 2013 IAAF Diamond League was the fourth edition of the Diamond League, an annual series of fourteen one-day track and field meetings.

The series began on 10 May in Doha, Qatar and ended on 6 September in Brussels, Belgium.

== Calendar ==
Calendar 2013
#	Date	Venue	City	Country	Meeting	100	200	400	800	1500	5000	3000s	110h	400h	High	Pole	Long	Triple	Shot	Discus	Javelin
1	10 May	Suheim Bin Hamad Stadium	Doha	Qatar	Qatar Athletic	M	F	F	M	F	M	F	F	M	M	M	F	M	M	F	M
2	18 May	Shanghai Stadium	Shanghai	China	Golden Grand Prix	F	M	M	F	M	F	M	M	F	M	F	M	F	F	M	M
3	25 May	Icahn Stadium	New York City	United States	Adidas Grand Prix	M	F	F	M	F	M	F	M	M	F	F	F	M	M	F	F
4	1 June	Hayward Field	Eugene	United States	Prefontaine Classic	F	M	M	F	M	F	M	M	F	M	M	M	F	F	M	F
5	6 June	Stadio Olimpico	Rome	Italy	Golden Gala Pietro Mennea	M	F	F	M	F	M	F	F	M	F	M	F	M	M	F	F
6	13 June	Bislett Stadion	Oslo	Norway	Bislett Games	F	M	M	F	M	F	M	F	F	F	F	F	F	F	M	M
7	30 June	Alexander Stadium	Birmingham	United Kingdom	British Grand Prix	M	F	F	M	F	M	F	F	M	M	F	M	M	M	F	M
8	4 July	Stade Olympique de la Pontaise	Lausanne	Switzerland	Athletissima	M	F	F	M	F	M	F	F	M	M	M	F	M	M	F	M
9	6 July	Stade de France	Paris	France	Meeting Areva	F	M	M	F	M	F	M	M	F	F	M	M	F	F	M	F
10	19 July	Stade Louis II	Monaco	Herculis	Monaco	M	F	F	M	F	M	F	F	M	F	M	F	M		F	M
11	26–27 July	London Stadium	London	United Kingdom	Sainsburys Anniversary Games	F	M	M	F	M	F	M	M	F	M	F	M	F	F	M	F
12	22 August	Olympic Stadium	Stockholm	Sweden	DN Galan	F	M	M	F	M	F	M	M	F	F	F	M	F	F	M	F
13	29 August	Letzigrund	Zürich	Switzerland	Weltklasse	M	F	F	F	M	F	M	M	F	M	F	MF		MF	M	F
14	6 September	King Baudouin Stadium	Brussels	Belgium	Memorial Van Damme	F	M	M	M	F	M	F	F	M	F	M		MF	M	F	M

M	Men events	F	Women events	Finals

== Winners ==
Diamond Race track events
Men	100 m	200 m	400 m	800 m	1500 m / Mile	5000 m / 3000 m	110 m hurdles	400 m hurdles	3000 m steeplechase
Women	100 m	200 m	400 m	800 m	1500 m	5000 m / 3000 m	100 m hurdles	400 m hurdles	3000 m steeplechase

Diamond Race field events
Men	Pole vault	High jump	Long jump	Triple jump	Shot put	Discus throw	Javelin throw
Women	Pole vault	High jump	Long jump	Triple jump	Shot put	Discus throw	Javelin throw

Events not included in the Diamond League are marked in grey background in the below tables.

=== Men ===
==== Track ====
#	Meeting	100 m	200 m	400 m	800 m	1500 m	5000 m	110 m h	400 m h	3000 m st
1	Doha	Justin Gatlin (USA); 9.97 SB	–	–	David Rudisha (KEN); 1:43.87 WL	Asbel Kiprop (KEN); 3:31.13 WL	Hagos Gebrhiwet (ETH); 7:30.36 WL, PB	–	Michael Tinsley (USA); 48.92	–
2	Shanghai	–	Warren Weir (JAM); 20.18	Kirani James (GRN); 44.02 WL, =MR	–	Asbel Kiprop (KEN); 3:32.39	–	Jason Richardson (USA); 13.23 SB	–	Conseslus Kipruto (KEN); 8:01.16 WL, MR, PB
3	New York	Ryan Bailey (USA); 10.15	Warren Weir (JAM); 20.11 SB	Joshua Mance (USA); 45.59	David Rudisha (KEN); 1:45.14	–	Hagos Gebrhiwet (ETH); 13:10.03 WL	Ryan Brathwaite (BAR); 13.19 SB	Michael Tinsley (USA); 48.43 SB	–
4	Eugene	Justin Gatlin (USA); 9.88w	Nickel Ashmeade (JAM); 20.14	LaShawn Merritt (USA); 44.32 SB	Mohammed Aman (ETH); 1:44.42	Silas Kiplagat (KEN); 3:49.48 WL	Edwin Cheruiyot Soi (KEN); 13:04.75 WL	Hansle Parchment (JAM); 13.05 WL, NR	–	Conseslus Kipruto (KEN); 8:03.59 MR
5	Rome	Justin Gatlin (USA); 9.94	–	LaShawn Merritt (USA); 44.96	Mohammed Aman (ETH); 1:43.61 WL	–	Yenew Alamirew (ETH); 12:54.95 WL	Sergey Shubenkov (RUS); 13.20 SB	Johnny Dutch (USA); 48.31	–
6	Oslo	–	Usain Bolt (JAM); 19.79 WL, MR	Yousef Ahmed Masrahi (KSA); 45.33	–	Ayanleh Souleiman (DJI); 3:50.53	–	–	–	Conseslus Kipruto (KEN); 8:04.48
7	Birmingham	Nesta Carter (JAM); 9.99	–	–	Mohammed Aman (ETH); 1:45.18	Aman Wote (ETH); 3:35.99	Mo Farah (GBR); 13:14.24	Ryan Brathwaite (BAR); 13.13w	Javier Culson (PUR); 48.59	–
8	Lausanne	Asafa Powell (JAM); 9.88	Churandy Martina (NED); 20.01 SB	–	Mohammed Aman (ETH); 1:43.33 SB	–	Yenew Alamirew (ETH); 13:06.69	David Oliver (USA); 13.03 WL	Javier Culson (PUR); 48.14 SB	–
9	Paris	–	Usain Bolt (JAM); 19.73 WL, MR	Kirani James (GRN); 43.96 WL	–	Ayanleh Souleiman (DJI); 3:32.55 SB	–	Aries Merritt (USA); 13.09 SB	–	Ezekiel Kemboi (KEN); 7:59.03 WL, MR
10	Monaco	Justin Gatlin (USA); 9.94	–	–	Duane Solomon (USA); 1:43.72	Asbel Kiprop (KEN); 3:27.72 WL, DLR, PB	Edwin Cheruiyot Soi (KEN); 12:51.34 WL, MR, PB	–	Jehue Gordon (TRI); 48.00 SB	–
11	London	Usain Bolt (JAM); 9.85 SB	Warren Weir (JAM); 19.89	Kirani James (GRN); 44.65	Nick Symmonds (USA); 1:43.67 SB	Augustine Kiprono Choge (KEN); 3:50.01 PB	–	David Oliver (USA); 13.20	Michael Tinsley (USA); 47.98	Brimin Kiprop Kipruto (KEN); 8:06.86 MR, SB
12	Stockholm	–	Serhiy Smelyk (UKR); 20.54	LaShawn Merritt (USA); 44.69	–	Ayanleh Souleiman (DJI); 3:33.59	–	David Oliver (USA); 13.21	–	Hillary Kipsang Yego (KEN); 8:09.81
13	Zürich	Usain Bolt (JAM); 9.90	–	LaShawn Merritt (USA); 44.13	Nick Symmonds (USA); 1:43.56	Silas Kiplagat (KEN); 3:30.97	–	David Oliver (USA); 13.12	–	Hillary Kipsang Yego (KEN); 8:08.03
14	Brussels	Usain Bolt (JAM); 9.80	Warren Weir (JAM); 19.87	Martyn Rooney (GBR); 45.05 SB	Mohammed Aman (ETH); 1:42.37 WL, NR	–	Yenew Alamirew (ETH); 12:58.75	–	Jehue Gordon (TRI); 48.32	–
Overall winner		Justin Gatlin (USA)	Warren Weir (JAM)	LaShawn Merritt (USA)	Mohammed Aman (ETH)	Ayanleh Souleiman (DJI)	Yenew Alamirew (ETH)	David Oliver (USA)	Javier Culson (PUR)	Conseslus Kipruto (KEN)

- In Doha, the 3000m was counted to the Diamond League standings for the 5000m.
- In London, the Mile run was counted to the Diamond League standings for the 1500m.

==== Field ====
#	Meeting	Long jump	Triple jump	High jump	Pole vault	Shot put	Discus	Javelin
1	Doha	–	Christian Taylor (USA); 17.25 SB	Bohdan Bondarenko (UKR); 2.33 =MR, PB	Konstadinos Filippidis (GRE); 5.82 WL, NR, MR	Ryan Whiting (USA); 22.28 WL, MR, PB	–	Vítězslav Veselý (CZE); 85.09 SB
2	Shanghai	Li Jinzhe (CHN); 8.34 WL, PB	–	Mutaz Essa Barshim (QAT); 2.33 =MR, SB	–	–	Piotr Małachowski (POL); 67.34 SB	Tero Pitkämäki (FIN); 87.60 WL, MR
3	New York	–	Benjamin Compaoré (FRA); 16.45	–	–	Ryan Whiting (USA); 21.27	–	–
4	Eugene	Aleksandr Menkov (RUS); 8.39 WL, PB	–	Mutaz Essa Barshim (QAT); 2.40 AR, MR, WL	Renaud Lavillenie (FRA); 5.95 WL	–	Robert Harting (GER); 69.75 WL	–
5	Rome	–	Christian Taylor (USA); 17.08	–	Raphael Holzdeppe (GER); 5.91 =PB	David Storl (GER); 20.70	–	–
6	Oslo	–	–	–	–	–	Gerd Kanter (EST); 65.52 SB	Vítězslav Veselý (CZE); 85.96
7	Birmingham	Aleksandr Menkov (RUS); 8.27	Christian Taylor (USA); 17.66 SB	Bohdan Bondarenko (UKR); 2.36 PB, =MR	–	Reese Hoffa (USA); 21.34	–	Andreas Thorkildsen (NOR); 83.94
8	Lausanne	–	Pedro Pablo Pichardo (CUB); 17.58	Bohdan Bondarenko (UKR); 2.41 WL, MR, NR	Konstadinos Filippidis (GRE); 5.72	Ryan Whiting (USA); 21.88 MR	–	Kim Amb (SWE); 82.65
9	Paris	Damar Forbes (JAM); 8.11	–	–	Renaud Lavillenie (FRA); 5.92	–	Robert Harting (GER); 67.04	–
10	Monaco	–	Christian Taylor (USA); 17.30	–	Renaud Lavillenie (FRA); 5.96 WL, DLR	–	–	Vítězslav Veselý (CZE); 87.68 WL
11	London	Aleksandr Menkov (RUS); 8.31	–	Bohdan Bondarenko (UKR); 2.38	Renaud Lavillenie (FRA); 6.02 WL, DLR, MR, PB	–	Piotr Małachowski (POL); 67.35	–
12	Stockholm	Aleksandr Menkov (RUS); 8.18	–	–	–	–	Piotr Małachowski (POL); 65.86	–
13	Zürich	Zarck Visser (RSA); 8.32	–	Bohdan Bondarenko (UKR); 2.33	–	Ryan Whiting (USA); 22.03	Gerd Kanter (EST); 67.02 SB	–
14	Brussels	–	Teddy Tamgho (FRA); 17.30	–	Renaud Lavillenie (FRA); 5.96 MR	Ryan Whiting (USA); 21.45	–	Tero Pitkämäki (FIN); 87.32
Overall winner		Aleksandr Menkov (RUS)	Christian Taylor (USA)	Bohdan Bondarenko (UKR)	Renaud Lavillenie (FRA)	Ryan Whiting (USA)	Gerd Kanter (EST)	Vítězslav Veselý (CZE)

=== Women ===
==== Track ====
#	Meeting	100 m	200 m	400 m	800 m	1500 m	5000 m	100 m h	400 m h	3000 m st
1	Doha	–	Shelly-Ann Fraser-Pryce (JAM); 22.48w	Amantle Montsho (BOT); 49.88 WL	–	Abeba Aregawi (SWE); 3:56.60 WL, NR, MR	–	Dawn Harper-Nelson (USA); 12.60 WL	–	Lidya Chepkurui (KEN); 9:13.75 WL, MR, PB
2	Shanghai	Shelly-Ann Fraser-Pryce (JAM); 10.93 WL	–	–	Francine Niyonsaba (BDI); 2:00.33 WL	–	Genzebe Dibaba (ETH); 14:45.92 WL	–	Zuzana Hejnová (CZE); 53.79 WL	–
3	New York	Aleen Bailey (JAM); 11.37	Veronica Campbell-Brown (JAM); 22.53 SB	Amantle Montsho (BOT); 49.91 MR	–	Abeba Aregawi (SWE); 4:03.69	–	–	–	Lydiah Chepkurui (KEN); 9:30.82
4	Eugene	Shelly-Ann Fraser-Pryce (JAM); 10.71w	–	Amantle Montsho (BOT); 50.01	Francine Niyonsaba (BDI); 1:56.72 WL, MR	Hellen Obiri (KEN); 3:58.58 MR, PB	Tirunesh Dibaba (ETH); 14:42.01 WL	–	Zuzana Hejnová (CZE); 53.70 WL	–
5	Rome	–	Murielle Ahouré (CIV); 22.36 NR	Amantle Montsho (BOT); 49.87 WL	–	Abeba Aregawi (SWE); 4:00.23	–	Dawn Harper-Nelson (USA); 12.65	–	Milcah Chemos (KEN); 9:16.14 SB
6	Oslo	Ivet Lalova (BUL); 11.04 SB	–	–	Ekaterina Poistogova (RUS); 1:59.39 SB	–	Meseret Defar (ETH); 14:26.90 WL	Tiffany Porter (GBR); 12.76	Zuzana Hejnová (CZE); 53.60 SB	–
7	Birmingham	–	Blessing Okagbare (NGR); 22.55	Christine Ohuruogu (GBR); 50.63	Jessica Judd (GBR); 1:59.85 PB	Abeba Aregawi (SWE); 4:03.70	–	Dawn Harper-Nelson (USA); 12.64	Perri Shakes-Drayton (GBR); 53.82 SB	Milcah Chemos (KEN); 9:17.43 MR
8	Lausanne	–	Mariya Ryemyen (UKR); 22.61 SB	Francena McCorory (USA); 50.36	–	Abeba Aregawi (SWE); 4:02.11	–	Dawn Harper-Nelson (USA); 12.53 SB	–	Hiwot Ayalew (ETH); 9:17.66 MR
9	Paris	Shelly-Ann Fraser-Pryce (JAM); 10.92 SB	–	–	Francine Niyonsaba (BDI); 1:57.26	–	Tirunesh Dibaba (ETH); 14:23.68 WL, MR	–	Zuzana Hejnová (CZE); 53.23 NR	–
10	Monaco	–	Murielle Ahouré (CIV); 22.24 NR	Amantle Montsho (BOT); 49.33 WL, DLR, NR	–	Jenny Simpson (USA); 4:00.48 SB	–	Queen Harrison (USA); 12.64	–	Milcah Chemos (KEN); 9:14.17 MR, SB
11	London	Blessing Okagbare (NGR); 10.79 AR	Allyson Felix (USA); 22.41	Christine Ohuruogu (GBR); 50.00 SB	Brenda Martinez (USA); 1:58.19 MR	Mary Kuria (KEN); 4:08.77	Shannon Rowbury (USA); 8:41.46 WL	Sally Pearson (AUS); 12.65 SB	Zuzana Hejnová (CZE); 53.07 WL, NR	–
12	Stockholm	Kerron Stewart (JAM); 11.24	–	Francena McCorory (USA); 51.03	Eunice Jepkoech Sum (KEN); 1:58.84	–	Meseret Defar (ETH); 8:30.29 WL	–	Zuzana Hejnová (CZE); 53.70 MR	–
13	Zürich	Carrie Russell (JAM); 10.98 PB	Shelly-Ann Fraser-Pryce (JAM); 22.40	–	Eunice Jepkoech Sum (KEN); 1:58.82	–	Meseret Defar (ETH); 14:32.83	–	Zuzana Hejnová (CZE); 53.32	–
14	Brussels	Shelly-Ann Fraser-Pryce (JAM); 10.72 MR	–	Natasha Hastings (USA); 50.36	–	Abeba Aregawi (SWE); 4:05.41	–	Dawn Harper-Nelson (USA); 12.48 SB	–	Milcah Chemos (KEN); 9:15.06 MR
Overall winner		Shelly-Ann Fraser-Pryce (JAM)	Shelly-Ann Fraser-Pryce (JAM)	Amantle Montsho (BOT)	Eunice Jepkoech Sum (KEN)	Abeba Aregawi (SWE)	Meseret Defar (ETH)	Dawn Harper-Nelson (USA)	Zuzana Hejnová (CZE)	Milcah Chemos (KEN)

- In Stockholm, the 3000m was counted to the Diamond League standings for the 5000m.

==== Field ====
#	Meeting	Long jump	Triple jump	High jump	Pole vault	Shot put	Discus	Javelin
1	Doha	Brittney Reese (USA); 7.25 WL, MR, PB	–	–	–	–	Sandra Perković (CRO); 68.23 WL, MR	–
2	Shanghai	–	Caterine Ibargüen (COL); 14.69 WL	–	Yelena Isinbayeva (RUS); 4.70 SB	Christina Schwanitz (GER); 20.20 PB	–	–
3	New York	Janay DeLoach (USA); 6.79 MR	–	Blanka Vlašić (CRO); 1.94 =MR, SB	Jennifer Suhr (USA); 4.63	–	Sandra Perković (CRO); 68.48 WL, MR	Christina Obergföll (GER); 65.33 SB
4	Eugene	–	Caterine Ibargüen (COL); 14.93w	–	–	Valerie Adams (NZL); 20.15	–	Christina Obergföll (GER); 67.70 MR
5	Rome	Brittney Reese (USA); 6.99	–	Anna Chicherova (RUS); Svetlana Shkolina (RUS); 1.98 (SB for Shkolina)	–	–	Sandra Perković (CRO); 68.25	Christina Obergföll (GER); 66.45
6	Oslo	Shara Proctor (GBR); 6.89	Caterine Ibargüen (COL); 14.81	Emma Green (SWE); 1.95	Silke Spiegelburg (GER); 4.65 SB	Christina Schwanitz (GER); 20.10	–	–
7	Birmingham	–	–	–	Yarisley Silva (CUB); 4.73	–	Sandra Perković (CRO); 64.32	–
8	Lausanne	Blessing Okagbare (NGR); 6.98 PB	–	–	–	–	Sandra Perković (CRO); 68.96 WL, MR	–
9	Paris	–	Caterine Ibargüen (COL); 14.69	Anna Chicherova (RUS); 2.01	–	Valerie Adams (NZL); 20.62	–	Christina Obergföll (GER); 64.74
10	Monaco	Blessing Okagbare (NGR); 7.04w	–	Brigetta Barrett (USA); 2.01	–	–	Sandra Perković (CRO); 65.30	–
11	London	Katarina Johnson-Thompson (GBR); 6.46 SB	Yekaterina Koneva (RUS); 14.52	–	Yarisley Silva (CUB); 4.83 DLR	Valerie Adams (NZL); 20.90 WL, MR	–	Christina Obergföll (GER); 65.61
12	Stockholm	Ivana Španović (SRB); 6.64	Caterine Ibargüen (COL); 14.61	Anna Chicherova (RUS); 1.98	Silke Spiegelburg (GER); 4.69	Valerie Adams (NZL); 20.30	–	Mariya Abakumova (RUS); 68.59 MR
13	Zürich	Shara Proctor (GBR); 6.88	–	–	Silke Spiegelburg (GER); 4.79 SB	Valerie Adams (NZL); 20.98 WL, MR	–	Mariya Abakumova (RUS); 68.94
14	Brussels	–	Caterine Ibargüen (COL); 14.49	Anna Chicherova (RUS); 1.98	–	–	Sandra Perković (CRO); 67.04	–
Overall winner		Shara Proctor (GBR)	Caterine Ibargüen (COL)	Svetlana Shkolina (RUS)	Silke Spiegelburg (GER)	Valerie Adams (NZL)	Sandra Perković (CRO)	Christina Obergföll (GER)

== Results ==
Doha
Event	1st +4 pts	2nd +2 pts	3rd +1 pts	4th ⠀	5th ⠀	6th ⠀	7th ⠀	8th ⠀
Men's 100m (+1.2 m/s)	Justin Gatlin; USA | 9.97	Michael Rodgers; USA | 9.99	Nesta Carter; JAM | 9.99	Kim Collins; SKN | 10.04	Samuel Francis; QAT | 10.08	Derrick Atkins; BAH | 10.14	Jak Ali Harvey; JAM | 10.17	Jason Young; JAM | 10.21
Men's 800m	David Rudisha; KEN | 1:43.87	Mohammed Aman; ETH | 1:44.21	Job Kinyor; KEN | 1:44.24	Pierre-Ambroise Bosse; FRA | 1:44.77	Musaeb Abdulrahman Balla; QAT | 1:44.83	Michael Rimmer; GBR | 1:44.97	Anthony Chemut; KEN | 1:45.06	Andrew Osagie; GBR | 1:45.41
Men's 3000m	Hagos Gebrhiwet; ETH | 7:30.36	Thomas Pkemei Longosiwa; KEN | 7:32.01	Yenew Alamirew; ETH | 7:32.64	Caleb Mwangangi Ndiku; KEN | 7:33.92	Hayle Ibrahimov; AZE | 7:34.57	Isiah Kiplangat Koech; KEN | 7:36.28	Augustine Kiprono Choge; KEN | 7:37.70	Abrar Osman; ERI | 7:39.70
Men's 400mH	Michael Tinsley; USA | 48.92	Bershawn Jackson; USA | 49.12	Cornel Fredericks; RSA | 49.35	Tristan Thomas; AUS | 49.82	Georg Fleischhauer; GER | 50.61	LJ van Zyl; RSA | 50.74	Justin Gaymon; USA | 1:34.57	Jack Green; GBR | DNF
Men's High Jump	Bohdan Bondarenko; UKR | 2.33 m	Mutaz Essa Barshim; QAT | 2.30 m	Aleksandr Shustov; RUS | 2.27 m	Robbie Grabarz; GBR | 2.24 m	Marco Fassinotti; ITA | 2.24 m	Sergey Mudrov; RUS | 2.24 m	Aleksey Dmitrik; RUS | 2.24 m	Donald Thomas; BAH | 2.24 m
Men's Pole Vault	Konstantinos Filippidis; GRE | 5.82 m	Malte Mohr; GER | 5.82 m	Raphael Holzdeppe; GER | 5.70 m	Tobias Scherbarth; GER | 5.60 m	Hendrik Gruber; GER | 5.60 m	Sergey Kucheryanu; RUS | 5.60 m	Björn Otto; GER | 5.50 m	Karsten Dilla; GER | 5.30 m
Men's Triple Jump	Christian Taylor; USA | 17.25 m	Benjamin Compaoré; FRA | 17.06 m	Aleksey Fyodorov; RUS | 16.85 m	Samyr Laine; HAI | 16.80 m	Tosin Oke; NGR | 16.64 m	Alieksei Tsapik; BLR | 16.60 m	Dimitrios Tsiamis; GRE | 16.53 m	Harold Correa; FRA | 16.31 m
Men's Shot Put	Ryan Whiting; USA | 22.28 m	Germán Luján Lauro; ARG | 21.26 m	Reese Hoffa; USA | 21.01 m	Cory Martin; USA | 20.55 m	Maksim Sidorov; RUS | DQ (Note: Disqualified after competition due to antidoping rule violation)	Tomasz Majewski; POL | 19.96 m	Marco Fortes; POR | 19.15 m	Om Prakash Singh Karhana; IND | 18.43 m
Men's Javelin Throw	Vítězslav Veselý; CZE | 85.09 m	Tero Pitkämäki; FIN | 82.18 m	Andreas Thorkildsen; NOR | 81.51 m	Matthias de Zordo; GER | 81.49 m	Ivan Zaytsev; UZB | 81.37 m	Keshorn Walcott; TTO | 79.79 m	Antti Ruuskanen; FIN | 76.31 m	Spiridon Lempesis; GRE | 73.92 m
Women's 200m (+2.2 m/s)	Shelly-Ann Fraser-Pryce; JAM | 22.48	Sherone Simpson; JAM | 22.73	Myriam Soumaré; FRA | 22.81	Samantha Henry-Robinson; JAM | 22.97	Kimberly Hyacinthe; CAN | 23.07	Yelizaveta Bryzgina; UKR | 23.30	Charonda Williams; USA | 23.34	Crystal Emmanuel; CAN | 23.40
Women's 400m	Amantle Montsho; BOT | 49.88	Allyson Felix; USA | 50.19	Christine Ohuruogu; GBR | 50.53	Francena McCorory; USA | 50.58	Natasha Hastings; USA | 51.32	Shericka Williams; JAM | 52.23	Marie Gayot; FRA | 52.81	Kimberly Hyacinthe; CAN | 57.51
Women's 1500m	Abeba Aregawi; SWE | 3:56.60	Faith Kipyegon; KEN | 3:56.98	Genzebe Dibaba; ETH | 3:57.54	Viola Jelagat Kibiwot; KEN | 4:00.76	Eunice Jepkoech Sum; KEN | 4:02.05	Mary Kuria; KEN | 4:03.56	Siham Hilali; MAR | 4:03.92	Betlhem Desalegn; UAE | 4:05.13
Women's 100mH (+0.4 m/s)	Dawn Harper-Nelson; USA | 12.60	Kellie Wells; USA | 12.73	Queen Claye; USA | 12.74	Tiffany Porter; GBR | 12.74	Lolo Jones; USA | 12.97	Veronica Borsi; ITA | 13.08	Latisha Holden; USA | 13.22	Yvette Lewis; USA | 14.90
Women's 3000mSC	Lidya Chepkurui; KEN | 9:13.75	Sofia Assefa; ETH | 9:14.61	Hiwot Ayalew; ETH | 9:17.60	Etenesh Diro; ETH | 9:17.78	Milcah Chemos; KEN | 9:19.17	Purity Kirui; KEN | 9:19.42	Habiba Ghribi; TUN | 9:22.20	Lydia Chebet Rotich; KEN | 9:26.31
Women's Long Jump	Brittney Reese; USA | 7.25 m	Blessing Okagbare; NGR | 7.14 m	Janay Deloach; USA | 7.08 m	Funmi Jimoh; USA | 6.92 m	Yelena Sokolova; RUS | 6.91 m	Shara Proctor; GBR | 6.82 m	Erica Jarder; SWE | 6.66 m	Chelsea Hayes; USA | 6.61 m
Women's Discus Throw	Sandra Perković; CRO | 68.23 m	Zinaida Sendriutė; LTU | 63.92 m	Anna Rüh; GER | 63.01 m	Żaneta Glanc; POL | 62.78 m	Nataliya Semenova; UKR | 61.41 m	Melina Robert-Michon; FRA | 61.09 m	Aretha D. Thurmond; USA | 60.19 m	Joanna Wiśniewska; POL | 58.92 m

Shanghai
Event	1st +4 pts	2nd +2 pts	3rd +1 pts	4th ⠀	5th ⠀	6th ⠀	7th ⠀	8th ⠀
Men's 200m (0.0 m/s)	Warren Weir; JAM | 20.18	Justin Gatlin; USA | 20.21	Jason Young; JAM | 20.22	Peimeng Zhang; CHN | 20.47	Churandy Martina; NED | 20.59	Darvis Patton; USA | 20.61	Zhenye Xie; CHN | 20.63	Wallace Spearmon; USA | 80.88
Men's 400m	Kirani James; GRN | 44.02	LaShawn Merritt; USA | 44.60	Luguelín Santos; DOM | 45.11	Jonathan Borlée; BEL | 45.57	Lalonde Gordon; TTO | 46.39	Huadong Zhang; CHN | 47.77	Pavel Maslák; CZE | DQ	Jian Guo; CHN | DNF
Men's 1500m	Asbel Kiprop; KEN | 3:32.39	Mekonnen Gebremedhin; ETH | 3:32.43	Collins Cheboi; KEN | 3:32.96	Abdelaati Iguider; MAR | 3:33.29	Bethwell Birgen; KEN | 3:33.67	Silas Kiplagat; KEN | 3:33.85	James Kiplagat Magut; KEN | 3:35.29	Teshome Dirirsa; ETH | 3:35.47
Men's 110mH (-0.5 m/s)	Jason Richardson; USA | 13.23	Ryan Wilson; USA | 13.25	Wenjun Xie; CHN | 13.28	David Oliver; USA | 13.35	Jeff Porter; USA | 13.45	Sergey Shubenkov; RUS | 13.52	Dongpeng Shi; CHN | 13.64	Lehann Fourie; RSA | 13.82
Men's 3000mSC	Conseslus Kipruto; KEN | 8:01.16	Paul Kipsiele Koech; KEN | 8:02.63	Hilal Yego; KEN | 8:03.57	Abel Kiprop Mutai; KEN | 8:08.83	Gilbert Kirui; KEN | 8:09.50	Jairus Kipchoge Birech; KEN | 8:10.27	Brimin Kiprop Kipruto; KEN | 8:14.97	Bernard Nganga; KEN | 8:20.69
Men's High Jump	Mutaz Essa Barshim; QAT | 2.33 m	Bohdan Bondarenko; UKR | 2.33 m	Zhang Guowei; CHN | 2.27 m	Michael Mason; CAN | 2.24 m	Robbie Grabarz; GBR | 2.24 m	Aleksandr Shustov; RUS | 2.24 m	Trevor Barry; BAH | 2.24 m	Sergey Mudrov; RUS | 2.20 m
Men's Long Jump	Jinzhe Li; CHN | 8.34 m	Aleksandr Menkov; RUS | 8.31 m	Greg Rutherford; GBR | 8.08 m	Xiongfeng Su; CHN | 8.00 m	Ngonidzashe Makusha; ZIM | 7.96 m	Ignisious Gaisah; GHA | 7.95 m	Godfrey Khotso Mokoena; RSA | 7.74 m	Irving Saladino; PAN | 7.72 m
Men's Discus Throw	Piotr Małachowski; POL | 67.34 m	Gerd Kanter; EST | 63.14 m	Robert Urbanek; POL | 62.85 m	Erik Cadée; NED | 62.40 m	Frank Casanas; ESP | 62.39 m	Vikas Gowda; IND | 61.97 m	Martin Marić; CRO | 60.73 m	Rutger Smith; NED | 60.12 m
Men's Javelin Throw	Tero Pitkämäki; FIN | 87.60 m	Vítězslav Veselý; CZE | 86.67 m	Dmitriy Tarabin; RUS | 85.36 m	Ari Mannio; FIN | 83.43 m	Qinggang Zhao; CHN | 81.18 m	Keshorn Walcott; TTO | 79.02 m	Julius Yego; KEN | 78.23 m	Stuart Farquhar; NZL | 76.36 m
Women's 100m (+0.1 m/s)	Shelly-Ann Fraser-Pryce; JAM | 10.93	Blessing Okagbare; NGR | 11.00	Carmelita Jeter; USA | 11.08	Samantha Henry-Robinson; JAM | 11.23	Sheri-Ann Brooks; JAM | 11.27	Aleen Bailey; JAM | 11.30	Ruddy Zang Milama; GAB | 11.36	Jeneba Tarmoh; USA | 11.42
Women's 800m	Francine Niyonsaba; BDI | 2:00.33	Janeth Jepkosgei; KEN | 2:01.28	Malika Akkaoui; MAR | 2:01.49	Winny Chebet; KEN | 2:01.54	Marina Arzamasova; BLR | 2:02.44	Chunyu Wang; CHN | 2:02.81	Tatyana Vinogradova; RUS | 2:02.92	Zhao Jing; CHN | 2:02.94
Women's 5000m	Genzebe Dibaba; ETH | 14:45.92	Meseret Defar; ETH | 14:47.76	Viola Jelagat Kibiwot; KEN | 14:48.29	Mercy Cherono; KEN | 14:49.84	Margaret Wangari Muriuki; KEN | 14:49.92	Buze Diriba; ETH | 14:50.24	Irine Chepet Cheptai; KEN | 14:50.99	Gelete Burka; ETH | 14:59.05
Women's 400mH	Zuzana Hejnová; CZE | 53.79	Angela Moroşanu; ROU | 53.85	Yadisleidis Pedroso; ITA | 54.54	Dalilah Muhammad; USA | 54.74	Kaliese Carter; JAM | 54.91	Lashinda Demus; USA | 55.12	Ajoke Odumosu; NGR | 55.94	Tiffany Williams; USA | 56.05
Women's Pole Vault	Yelena Isinbayeva; RUS | 4.70 m	Mary Saxer; USA | 4.60 m	Silke Spiegelburg; GER | 4.55 m	Li Ling; CHN | 4.50 m	Lacy Janson; USA | 4.40 m	Anastasiya Savchenko; RUS | 4.40 m	Angelica Bengtsson; SWE | 4.40 m	Becky Holliday Ward; USA | 4.15 m
Women's Triple Jump	Caterine Ibarguen; COL | 14.69 m	Olha Saladukha; UKR | 14.43 m	Irina Gumenyuk; RUS | 14.02 m	Limei Xie; CHN | 13.99 m	Kimberly Williams; JAM | 13.99 m	Niki Panetta; GRE | 13.81 m	Dana Velďáková; SVK | 13.76 m	Keila Costa; BRA | 13.63 m
Women's Shot Put	Christina Schwanitz; GER | 20.20 m	Lijiao Gong; CHN | 19.73 m	Michelle Carter; USA | 18.83 m	Xiangrong Liu; CHN | 18.11 m	Anca Heltne; ROU | 18.02 m	Josephine Terlecki; GER | 17.97 m	Jeneva Stevens; USA | 17.83 m	Anita Márton; HUN | 17.23 m

New
Event	1st ⠀	2nd ⠀	3rd ⠀	4th ⠀	5th ⠀	6th ⠀	7th ⠀	8th ⠀
Men's 100m (-0.8 m/s)	Tyson Gay; USA | DQ	Ryan Bailey; USA | 10.15	Keston Bledman; TTO | 10.16	Nesta Carter; JAM | 10.24	Jak Ali Harvey; JAM | 10.29	Nickel Ashmeade; JAM | 10.31	Kemar Bailey-Cole; JAM | 10.33	Rakieem Salaam; USA | 10.50
Men's 800m	David Rudisha; KEN | 1:45.14	Andrew Osagie; GBR | 1:46.44	Timothy Kitum; KEN | 1:46.93	Mbulaeni Mulaudzi; RSA | 1:47.46	Michael Rutt; USA | 1:47.53	Robby Andrews; USA | 1:48.57	Nathan Brannen; CAN | 1:48.61	Leonel Manzano; USA | 1:48.89
Men's 5000m	Hagos Gebrhiwet; ETH | 13:10.03	Vincent Kiprop Chepkok; KEN | 13:15.51	Ibrahim Jeilan; ETH | 13:16.46	Ben True; USA | 13:16.94	Juan Luis Barrios; MEX | 13:28.17	Dejen Gebremeskel; ETH | 13:31.02	Mark Kosgei Kiptoo; KEN | 13:36.92	Daniele Meucci; ITA | 13:50.53
Men's 110mH (+1.2 m/s)	Ryan Brathwaite; BAR | 13.19	Orlando Ortega; CUB | 13.24	Sergey Shubenkov; RUS | 13.29	Omoghan Osaghae; USA | 13.49	Jeff Porter; USA | 13.49	Dwight Thomas; JAM | 13.50	Antwon Hicks; USA | 13.63	Tyron Akins; USA | 13.64
Men's 400mH	Michael Tinsley; USA | 48.43	Javier Culson; PUR | 48.53	Johnny Dutch; USA | 48.78	Omar Cisneros; CUB | 49.33	Justin Gaymon; USA | 49.41	Jehue Gordon; TTO | 49.76	Leford Green; JAM | 50.09	Cornel Fredericks; RSA | 50.73
Men's Triple Jump	Benjamin Compaoré; FRA | 16.45 m	Christian Taylor; USA | 16.42 m	Gaetan Saku Bafuanga; FRA | 16.15 m	Samyr Laine; HAI | 16.08 m	Harold Correa; FRA | 16.07 m	Peder Pawel Nielsen; DEN | 15.97 m	Tosin Oke; NGR | 15.72 m	Shuo Cao; CHN | 15.02 m
Men's Shot Put	Ryan Whiting; USA | 21.27 m	Reese Hoffa; USA | 20.69 m	Cory Martin; USA | 20.60 m	Joe Kovacs; USA | 20.46 m	Dylan Armstrong; CAN | 20.27 m	Tomasz Majewski; POL | 20.11 m	Asmir Kolašinac; SRB | 19.68 m	Justin Rodhe; CAN | 19.12 m
Women's 200m (-1.3 m/s)	Veronica Campbell-Brown; JAM | 22.53	Anneisha McLaughlin-Whilby; JAM | 22.63	Shalonda Solomon; USA | 22.91	Sherone Simpson; JAM | 22.96	DeeDee Trotter; USA | 23.03	Bianca Knight; USA | 23.33	Tiffany Townsend; USA | 23.37	Debbie Ferguson-McKenzie; BAH | 23.85
Women's 400m	Amantle Montsho; BOT | 49.91	Natasha Hastings; USA | 50.24	Francena McCorory; USA | 51.06	Novlene Williams-Mills; JAM | 51.12	Jessica Beard; USA | 51.47	Christine Ohuruogu; GBR | 52.08	Christine Day; JAM | 52.12	
Women's 1500m	Abeba Aregawi; SWE | 4:03.69	Hellen Obiri; KEN | 4:04.84	Brenda Martinez; USA | 4:06.25	Nancy Jebet Langat; KEN | 4:06.57	Shannon Rowbury; USA | 4:07.36	Sheila Reid; CAN | 4:07.47	Morgan Uceny; USA | 4:08.49	Kate Grace; USA | 4:08.92
Women's 3000mSC	Lidya Chepkurui; KEN | 9:30.82	Etenesh Diro; ETH | 9:33.76	Sofia Assefa; ETH | 9:33.84	Bridget Franek; USA | 9:35.42	Purity Kirui; KEN | 9:40.33	Beverly Ramos; PUR | 9:43.28	Claire Perraux; FRA | 9:43.70	Eilish McColgan; GBR | 9:45.66
Women's High Jump	Blanka Vlašić; CRO | 1.94 m	Emma Green; SWE | 1.91 m	Brigetta Barrett; USA | 1.91 m	Levern Spencer; LCA | 1.85 m	Olena Holosha; UKR | 1.80 m	Doreen Amata; NGR | 1.80 m	Mélanie Melfort; FRA | 1.80 m	Priscilla Frederick; USA | 1.80 m
Women's Pole Vault	Jennifer Suhr; USA | 4.63 m	Fabiana Murer; BRA | 4.53 m	Yarisley Silva; CUB | 4.53 m	Lacy Janson; USA | 4.53 m	Jiřina Ptáčníková; CZE | 4.38 m	Holly Bradshaw; GBR | 4.23 m	Becky Holliday Ward; USA | 4.23 m	Angelica Bengtsson; SWE | NH m
Women's Long Jump	Janay Deloach; USA | 6.79 m	Shara Proctor; GBR | 6.72 m	Éloyse Lesueur-Aymonin; FRA | 6.67 m	Tori Polk; USA | 6.42 m	Erica Jarder; SWE | 6.31 m	Tori Bowie; USA | 6.31 m	Funmi Jimoh; USA | 6.10 m	Brittney Reese; USA | 5.99 m
Women's Discus Throw	Sandra Perković; CRO | 68.48 m	Gia Lewis-Smallwood; USA | 61.86 m	Melina Robert-Michon; FRA | 61.45 m	Żaneta Glanc; POL | 61.02 m	Whitney Ashley; USA | 58.17 m	Allison Randall; JAM | 57.85 m	Aretha D. Thurmond; USA | 57.55 m	
Women's Javelin Throw	Christina Obergföll; GER | 65.33 m	Mariya Abakumova; RUS | 64.25 m	Kimberley Mickle; AUS | 63.93 m	Vera Markaryan; UKR | 60.95 m	Martina Ratej; SLO | DQ	Brittany Borman; USA | 58.73 m	Sunette Viljoen; RSA | 57.87 m	Ásdís Hjálmsdóttir; ISL | 56.90 m

Eugene
Event	1st +4 pts	2nd +2 pts	3rd +1 pts	4th ⠀	5th ⠀	6th ⠀	7th ⠀	8th ⠀
Men's 200m (-0.9 m/s)	Nickel Ashmeade; JAM | 20.14	Walter Dix; USA | 20.16	Jason Young; JAM | 20.20	Churandy Martina; NED | 20.36	Jaysuma Saidy Ndure; NOR | 20.51	Jeremy Dodson; USA | 20.52	Calesio Newman; USA | 20.71	Maurice Mitchell; USA | 20.73
Men's 400m	LaShawn Merritt; USA | 44.32	Kirani James; GRN | 44.39	Tony McQuay; USA | 45.31	Luguelín Santos; DOM | 45.33	Kévin Borlée; BEL | 45.56	Lalonde Gordon; TTO | 45.67	Christopher Brown; BAH | 45.85	Pavel Maslák; CZE | 46.05
Men's Mile	Silas Kiplagat; KEN | 3:49.48	Asbel Kiprop; KEN | 3:49.53	Aman Wote; ETH | 3:49.88	Ayanleh Souleiman; DJI | 3:50.40	Bethwell Birgen; KEN | 3:50.42	Caleb Mwangangi Ndiku; KEN | 3:50.46	Nixon Kiplimo Chepseba; KEN | 3:51.37	Collins Cheboi; KEN | 3:51.44
Men's 110mH (+0.9 m/s)	Hansle Parchment; JAM | 13.05	Orlando Ortega; CUB | 13.08	David Oliver; USA | 13.10	Ryan Wilson; USA | 13.18	Andrew Riley; JAM | 13.20	Sergey Shubenkov; RUS | 13.22	Jeff Porter; USA | 13.35	Jason Richardson; USA | 13.45
Men's 3000mSC	Conseslus Kipruto; KEN | 8:03.59	Paul Kipsiele Koech; KEN | 8:05.86	Mahiedine Mekhissi; FRA | 8:06.60	Evan Jager; USA | 8:08.60	Hilal Yego; KEN | 8:09.84	Abel Kiprop Mutai; KEN | 8:10.04	Jairus Kipchoge Birech; KEN | 8:12.65	Daniel Huling; USA | 8:22.38
Men's High Jump	Mutaz Essa Barshim; QAT | 2.40 m	Erik Kynard; USA | 2.36 m	Derek Drouin; CAN | 2.36 m	Aleksey Dmitrik; RUS | 2.30 m	Zhang Guowei; CHN | 2.26 m	Robbie Grabarz; GBR | 2.26 m	Sergey Mudrov; RUS | 2.26 m	Ivan Ukhov; RUS | DQ
Men's Pole Vault	Renaud Lavillenie; FRA | 5.95 m	Björn Otto; GER | 5.90 m	Raphael Holzdeppe; GER | 5.84 m	Malte Mohr; GER | 5.84 m	Brad Walker; USA | 5.61 m	Steven Lewis; GBR | 5.51 m	Konstantinos Filippidis; GRE | 5.51 m	Yansheng Yang; CHN | 5.41 m
Men's Long Jump	Aleksandr Menkov; RUS | 8.39 m	Mauro Vinicius da Silva; BRA | 8.22 m	Greg Rutherford; GBR | 8.22 m	Will Claye; USA | 8.10 m	Irving Saladino; PAN | 7.91 m	Sebastian Bayer; GER | 7.83 m	Michel Tornéus; SWE | 7.72 m	Dwight Phillips; USA | 7.71 m
Men's Discus Throw	Robert Harting; GER | 69.75 m	Piotr Małachowski; POL | 68.19 m	Ehsan Hadadi; IRI | 65.63 m	Martin Wierig; GER | 65.54 m	Gerd Kanter; EST | 63.58 m	Vikas Gowda; IND | 63.30 m	Frank Casanas; ESP | 61.97 m	Lance Brooks; USA | 60.89 m
Women's 100m (+2.2 m/s)	Shelly-Ann Fraser-Pryce; JAM | 10.71	Blessing Okagbare; NGR | 10.75	Veronica Campbell-Brown; JAM | 10.78	Kerron Stewart; JAM | 10.97	Murielle Ahouré-Demps; CIV | 10.98	Ana Claudia Lemos; BRA | 11.06	Allyson Felix; USA | 11.07	Barbara Pierre; USA | 11.10
Women's 800m	Francine Niyonsaba; BDI | 1:56.72	Brenda Martinez; USA | 1:58.18	Janeth Jepkosgei; KEN | 1:58.71	Alysia Montaño; USA | 1:59.43	Mary Cain; USA | 1:59.51	Marilyn Okoro; GBR | 2:00.70	Ekaterina Guliyev; RUS | 2:01.26	Winny Chebet; KEN | 2:01.37
Women's 5000m	Tirunesh Dibaba; ETH | 14:42.01	Mercy Cherono; KEN | 14:42.51	Margaret Wangari Muriuki; KEN | 14:43.68	Buze Diriba; ETH | 14:51.15	Gelete Burka; ETH | 14:52.93	Hiwot Ayalew; ETH | 14:57.02	Belaynesh Oljira; ETH | 15:01.51	Linet Chepkwemoi Masai; KEN | 15:02.98
Women's 400mH	Zuzana Hejnová; CZE | 53.70	Georganne Moline; USA | 54.75	Kaliese Carter; JAM | 55.03	Denisa Rosolová; CZE | 55.11	Lashinda Demus; USA | 55.25	T'erea Brown; USA | 55.28	Perri Shakes-Drayton; GBR | 55.74	Natalya Antyukh; RUS | DQ
Women's Triple Jump	Caterine Ibarguen; COL | 14.93 m	Olha Saladukha; UKR | 14.85 m	Kimberly Williams; JAM | 14.78 m	Dana Velďáková; SVK | 14.31 m	Keila Costa; BRA | 14.23 m	Hanna Minenko; ISR | 14.15 m	Yamilé Aldama; GBR | 14.06 m	Viktoriya Gurova; RUS | DQ
Women's Shot Put	Valerie Adams; NZL | 20.15 m	Lijiao Gong; CHN | 20.12 m	Michelle Carter; USA | 19.65 m	Xiangrong Liu; CHN | 18.37 m	Anca Heltne; ROU | 17.65 m			
Women's Javelin Throw	Christina Obergföll; GER | 67.70 m	Kimberley Mickle; AUS | 63.80 m	Sunette Viljoen; RSA | 63.00 m	Martina Ratej; SLO | DQ	Mariya Abakumova; RUS | 60.29 m	Madara Palameika; LAT | 58.61 m	Brittany Borman; USA | 58.01 m	Vera Markaryan; UKR | 57.74 m

Rome
Event	1st +4 pts	2nd +2 pts	3rd +1 pts	4th ⠀	5th ⠀	6th ⠀	7th ⠀	8th ⠀
Men's 100m (+0.8 m/s)	Justin Gatlin; USA | 9.94	Usain Bolt; JAM | 9.95	Jimmy Vicaut; FRA | 10.02	Michael Rodgers; USA | 10.04	Kim Collins; SKN | 10.07	Rakieem Salaam; USA | 10.08	Calesio Newman; USA | 10.29	Michael Tumi; ITA | 10.29
Men's 800m	Mohammed Aman; ETH | 1:43.61	Pierre-Ambroise Bosse; FRA | 1:43.91	André Olivier; RSA | 1:44.37	Giordano Benedetti; ITA | 1:44.67	Job Kinyor; KEN | 1:44.73	Adam Kszczot; POL | 1:44.76	Kevin López; ESP | 1:45.03	Duane Solomon; USA | 1:45.14
Men's 5000m	Yenew Alamirew; ETH | 12:54.95	Hagos Gebrhiwet; ETH | 12:55.73	Isiah Kiplangat Koech; KEN | 12:58.85	John Kipkoech; KEN | 13:01.64	Edwin Cheruiyot Soi; KEN | 13:02.54	Caleb Mwangangi Ndiku; KEN | 13:03.80	Imane Merga; ETH | 13:09.17	Albert Rop; BRN | 13:10.14
Men's 400mH	Johnny Dutch; USA | 48.31	Javier Culson; PUR | 48.36	Mamadou Kasse Hann; SEN | 48.56	Justin Gaymon; USA | 48.64	David Greene; GBR | 48.81	Jeshua Anderson; USA | 49.33	Omar Cisneros; CUB | 49.54	Leonardo Capotosti; ITA | 50.48
Men's Pole Vault	Raphael Holzdeppe; GER | 5.91 m	Renaud Lavillenie; FRA | 5.86 m	Malte Mohr; GER | 5.86 m	Björn Otto; GER | 5.80 m	Jan Kudlička; CZE | 5.70 m	Konstantinos Filippidis; GRE | 5.70 m	Sergey Kucheryanu; RUS | 5.60 m	Giuseppe Gibilisco; ITA | 5.60 m
Men's Triple Jump	Christian Taylor; USA | 17.08 m	Daniele Greco; ITA | 17.04 m	Teddy Tamgho; FRA | 17.01 m	Fabrizio Schembri; ITA | 16.85 m	Benjamin Compaoré; FRA | 16.81 m	Ernesto Revé; CUB | 16.72 m	Phillips Idowu; GBR | 16.44 m	Seref Osmanoglu; TUR | 16.43 m
Men's Shot Put	David Storl; GER | 20.70 m	Cory Martin; USA | 20.54 m	Dylan Armstrong; CAN | 20.29 m	Ladislav Prášil; CZE | 20.28 m	Reese Hoffa; USA | 20.23 m	Asmir Kolašinac; SRB | 20.06 m	Georgi Ivanov; BUL | 19.99 m	Maksim Sidorov; RUS | DQ
Women's 200m (+1.2 m/s)	Murielle Ahouré-Demps; CIV | 22.36	Allyson Felix; USA | 22.64	Ivet Lalova-Collio; BUL | 22.78	Kerron Stewart; JAM | 22.82	Myriam Soumaré; FRA | 22.96	Lauryn Williams; USA | 23.08	Jeneba Tarmoh; USA | 23.11	Charonda Williams; USA | 23.26
Women's 400m	Amantle Montsho; BOT | 49.87	Francena McCorory; USA | 50.05	Natasha Hastings; USA | 50.53	Keshia Kirtz; USA | 51.87	Marie Gayot; FRA | 51.89	Olha Zemlyak; UKR | 51.95	Moa Hjelmer; SWE | 52.67	Ilona Usovich; BLR | 53.32
Women's 1500m	Abeba Aregawi; SWE | 4:00.23	Genzebe Dibaba; ETH | 4:01.62	Jenny Simpson; USA | 4:02.30	Hannah England; GBR | 4:03.91	Siham Hilali; MAR | 4:04.30	Mimi Belete; BRN | 4:04.81	Faith Kipyegon; KEN | 4:05.31	Yelena Soboleva; RUS | 4:05.34
Women's 100mH (+0.3 m/s)	Dawn Harper-Nelson; USA | 12.65	Lolo Jones; USA | 12.70	Ginnie Crawford; USA | 12.90	Queen Claye; USA | 12.92	Veronica Borsi; ITA | 12.97	Marzia Caravelli; ITA | 13.01	Alina Talay; BLR | 13.03	Micol Cattaneo; ITA | 13.07
Women's 3000mSC	Milcah Chemos; KEN | 9:16.14	Lidya Chepkurui; KEN | 9:18.10	Sofia Assefa; ETH | 9:21.24	Hiwot Ayalew; ETH | 9:22.76	Etenesh Diro; ETH | 9:22.87	Lydia Chebet Rotich; KEN | 9:33.55	Salima el Ouali Alami; MAR | 9:35.88	Antje Möldner-Schmidt; GER | 9:36.22
Women's High Jump	Anna Chicherova; RUS | 1.98 m	Svetlana Shkolina; RUS | DQ	Blanka Vlašić; CRO | 1.95 m	Emma Green; SWE | 1.92 m	Irina Gordeyeva; RUS | 1.88 m	Nadiya Dusanova; UZB | 1.88 m	Marie-Laurence Jungfleisch; GER | 1.88 m	Anna Iljuštšenko; EST | 1.88 m
Women's Long Jump	Brittney Reese; USA | 6.99 m	Janay Deloach; USA | 6.97 m	Shara Proctor; GBR | 6.91 m	Yelena Sokolova; RUS | 6.87 m	Darya Klishina; RUS | 6.81 m	Éloyse Lesueur-Aymonin; FRA | 6.78 m	Sosthene Moguenara-Taroum; GER | 6.68 m	Funmi Jimoh; USA | 6.64 m
Women's Discus Throw	Sandra Perković; CRO | 68.25 m	Yarelis Barrios; CUB | 64.41 m	Zinaida Sendriutė; LTU | 62.85 m	Anna Rüh; GER | 62.40 m	Yaimé Pérez; CUB | 61.90 m	Melina Robert-Michon; FRA | 61.29 m	Aretha D. Thurmond; USA | 61.18 m	Julia Harting; GER | 61.06 m
Women's Javelin Throw	Christina Obergföll; GER | 66.45 m	Mariya Abakumova; RUS | 64.03 m	Sunette Viljoen; RSA | 63.49 m	Sinta Sprudzāne; LAT | 62.52 m	Martina Ratej; SLO | DQ	Madara Palameika; LAT | 61.85 m	Vera Markaryan; UKR | 60.86 m	Līna Mūze-Sirmā; LAT | 59.30 m

Oslo
Event	1st +4 pts	2nd +2 pts	3rd +1 pts	4th ⠀	5th ⠀	6th ⠀	7th ⠀	8th ⠀
Men's 200m (+1.7 m/s)	Usain Bolt; JAM | 19.79	Jaysuma Saidy Ndure; NOR | 20.36	James Ellington; GBR | 20.55	Jonathan Borlée; BEL | 20.56	David Bolarinwa; GBR | 20.62	Daniel Talbot; GBR | 20.72	Nil de Oliveira; SWE | 20.88	Churandy Martina; NED | DQ
Men's 400m	Youssef Ahmed Masrahi; KSA | 45.33	Ramon Miller; BAH | 45.58	Nigel Levine; GBR | 45.63	Luguelín Santos; DOM | 45.69	Kévin Borlée; BEL | 45.86	Martyn Rooney; GBR | 46.11	Nick Ekelund-Arenander; DEN | 46.80	Yannick Fonsat; FRA | 62.69
Men's Mile	Ayanleh Souleiman; DJI | 3:50.53	Nixon Kiplimo Chepseba; KEN | 3:50.95	James Kiplagat Magut; KEN | 3:51.11	Ilham Tanui Özbilen; TUR | 3:52.30	Collins Cheboi; KEN | 3:52.70	David Bustos; ESP | 3:53.40	Bethwell Birgen; KEN | 3:53.46	Andreas Vojta; AUT | 3:53.95
Men's 3000mSC	Conseslus Kipruto; KEN | 8:04.48	Ezekiel Kemboi; KEN | 8:07.00	Hilal Yego; KEN | 8:09.01	Jairus Kipchoge Birech; KEN | 8:11.29	Gilbert Kirui; KEN | 8:12.36	Abel Kiprop Mutai; KEN | 8:19.93	Roba Gari; ETH | 8:24.66	Hamid Ezzine; MAR | 8:24.73
Men's Discus Throw	Gerd Kanter; EST | 65.52 m	Ehsan Hadadi; IRI | 64.63 m	Robert Urbanek; POL | 64.58 m	Martin Wierig; GER | 63.92 m	Erik Cadée; NED | 63.73 m	Frank Casanas; ESP | 62.64 m	Fredrik Amundgård; NOR | 57.18 m	Magnus Røsholm Berntsen; NOR | 54.94 m
Men's Javelin Throw	Vítězslav Veselý; CZE | 85.96 m	Tero Pitkämäki; FIN | 84.74 m	Thomas Röhler; GER | 82.83 m	Kim Amb; SWE | 82.60 m	Roman Avramenko; UKR | 82.04 m	Andreas Thorkildsen; NOR | 80.99 m	Ari Mannio; FIN | 80.70 m	Ivan Zaytsev; UZB | 78.28 m
Women's 100m (+1.2 m/s)	Ivet Lalova-Collio; BUL | 11.04	Murielle Ahouré-Demps; CIV | 11.05	Mariya Ryemyen; UKR | 11.07	Olesya Povh; UKR | 11.15	Verena Sailer; GER | 11.24	Ezinne Okparaebo; NOR | 11.30	Sheri-Ann Brooks; JAM | 11.34	Myriam Soumaré; FRA | 11.38
Women's 800m	Ekaterina Guliyev; RUS | 1:59.39	Nataliya Lupu; UKR | 1:59.59	Janeth Jepkosgei; KEN | 2:00.09	Fantu Magiso; ETH | 2:00.25	Nelly Jepkosgei; KEN | 2:00.52	Winny Chebet; KEN | 2:01.21	Laura Crowe; IRL | 2:02.69	Clarisse Moh; FRA | 2:03.54
Women's 5000m	Meseret Defar; ETH | 14:26.90	Viola Jelagat Kibiwot; KEN | 14:33.48	Genzebe Dibaba; ETH | 14:37.68	Margaret Wangari Muriuki; KEN | 14:40.48	Mercy Cherono; KEN | 14:42.43	Buze Diriba; ETH | 14:50.02	Agnes Jebet Tirop; KEN | 14:50.36	Irine Chepet Cheptai; KEN | 14:57.56
Women's 100mH (+1.4 m/s)	Tiffany Porter; GBR | 12.76	Sara Aerts; BEL | 12.95	Beate Schrott; AUT | 12.97	Veronica Borsi; ITA | 12.99	Alina Talay; BLR | 13.03	Isabelle Pedersen; NOR | 13.16	Cindy Billaud; FRA | 13.19	Reina-Flor Okori; FRA | 13.31
Women's 400mH	Zuzana Hejnová; CZE | 53.60	Perri Shakes-Drayton; GBR | 54.03	Dalilah Muhammad; USA | 54.33	Angela Moroşanu; ROU | 54.52	Lashinda Demus; USA | 54.69	Anna Ryzhykova; UKR | 55.41	Yadisleidis Pedroso; ITA | 55.68	Stine Tomb; NOR | 58.49
Women's High Jump	Svetlana Shkolina; RUS | DQ	Emma Green; SWE | 1.95 m	Anna Chicherova; RUS | 1.95 m	Tonje Angelsen; NOR | 1.90 m	Ruth Beitia; ESP | 1.85 m	Blanka Vlašić; CRO | 1.85 m	Anna Iljuštšenko; EST | 1.85 m	Irina Gordeyeva; RUS | 1.85 m
Women's Pole Vault	Silke Spiegelburg; GER | 4.65 m	Nikoleta Kyriakopoulou; GRE | 4.60 m	Anna Rogowska; POL | 4.50 m	Angelica Bengtsson; SWE | 4.50 m	Lisa Ryzih; GER | 4.40 m	Jiřina Ptáčníková; CZE | 4.30 m	Martina Strutz; GER | 4.30 m	Cathrine Larsåsen; NOR | 4.20 m
Women's Long Jump	Shara Proctor; GBR | 6.89 m	Éloyse Lesueur-Aymonin; FRA | 6.68 m	Yelena Sokolova; RUS | 6.65 m	Erica Jarder; SWE | 6.59 m	Veronika Semashko; RUS | 6.54 m	Ivana Vuleta; SRB | 6.50 m	Lauma Grīva; LAT | 6.48 m	Nadia Assa; NOR | 5.87 m
Women's Triple Jump	Caterine Ibarguen; COL | 14.81 m	Olha Saladukha; UKR | 14.56 m	Anna Pyatykh; RUS | 14.16 m	Snežana Vukmirovič; SLO | 14.10 m	Kimberly Williams; JAM | 13.98 m	Dana Velďáková; SVK | 13.92 m	Yekaterina Kayukova-Chernenko; RUS | 13.84 m	Yamilé Aldama; GBR | 13.82 m
Women's Shot Put	Christina Schwanitz; GER | 20.10 m	Nadine Kleinert; GER | 18.17 m	Natalia Ducó; CHI | 18.00 m	Josephine Terlecki; GER | 17.63 m	Kristin Sundsteigen; NOR | 14.48 m			

Birmingham
Event	1st +4 pts	2nd +2 pts	3rd +1 pts	4th ⠀	5th ⠀	6th ⠀	7th ⠀	8th ⠀
Men's 100m (+0.8 m/s)	Nesta Carter; JAM | 9.99	James Dasaolu; GBR | 10.03	Kim Collins; SKN | 10.06	Michael Rodgers; USA | 10.07	Jimmy Vicaut; FRA | 10.10	James Ellington; GBR | 10.17	Kimmari Roach; JAM | 10.17	Julian Forte; JAM | 10.26
Men's 800m	Mohammed Aman; ETH | 1:45.18	André Olivier; RSA | 1:45.64	Andrew Osagie; GBR | 1:45.80	Erik Sowinski; USA | 1:46.07	Gareth Warburton; GBR | 1:47.50	Mark Wieczorek; USA | 1:48.74	Mukhtar Mohammed; GBR | 1:51.97	Matthew Scherer; USA | DNF
Men's 5000m	Mo Farah; GBR | 13:14.24	Yenew Alamirew; ETH | 13:14.71	Hagos Gebrhiwet; ETH | 13:17.11	Ibrahim Jeilan; ETH | 13:19.88	Mark Kosgei Kiptoo; KEN | 13:20.51	Moses Ndiema Kipsiro; UGA | 13:22.96	Chris Thompson; GBR | 13:24.06	Collis Birmingham; AUS | 13:29.53
Men's 400mH	Javier Culson; PUR | 48.59	Rhys Williams; GBR | 48.93	Michael Tinsley; USA | 48.94	Jehue Gordon; TTO | 49.02	David Greene; GBR | 49.55	Mamadou Kasse Hann; SEN | 49.60	Félix Sánchez; DOM | 49.68	Mahau Suguimati; BRA | 49.96
Men's High Jump	Bohdan Bondarenko; UKR | 2.36 m	Erik Kynard; USA | 2.34 m	Robbie Grabarz; GBR | 2.31 m	Tom Parsons; GBR | 2.25 m	Mihai Donisan; ROU | 2.21 m	Aleksey Dmitrik; RUS | 2.21 m	Brandon Starc; AUS | 2.21 m	Jesse Williams; USA | 2.16 m
Men's Long Jump	Aleksandr Menkov; RUS | 8.27 m	Greg Rutherford; GBR | 8.11 m	Chris Tomlinson; GBR | 7.97 m	Godfrey Khotso Mokoena; RSA | 7.90 m	Ngonidzashe Makusha; ZIM | 7.83 m	Michel Tornéus; SWE | 7.81 m	Dwight Phillips; USA | 7.72 m	Zarck Visser; RSA | 7.69 m
Men's Triple Jump	Christian Taylor; USA | 17.66 m	Teddy Tamgho; FRA | 17.47 m	Yoann Rapinier; FRA | 16.88 m	Nathan Douglas; GBR | 16.70 m	Samyr Laine; HAI | 16.36 m	Harold Correa; FRA | 16.36 m	Jonathan Henrique Silva; BRA | 16.10 m	Benjamin Compaoré; FRA | 16.04 m
Men's Shot Put	Reese Hoffa; USA | 21.31 m	Ryan Whiting; USA | 20.89 m	Ladislav Prášil; CZE | 20.76 m	Tomasz Majewski; POL | 20.45 m	Georgi Ivanov; BUL | 19.90 m	Marco Fortes; POR | 19.32 m	Zane Duquemin; GBR | 18.64 m	
Men's Javelin Throw	Andreas Thorkildsen; NOR | 83.94 m	Ari Mannio; FIN | 83.26 m	Dmitriy Tarabin; RUS | 83.03 m	Roman Avramenko; UKR | 81.72 m	Kim Amb; SWE | 81.11 m	Stuart Farquhar; NZL | 79.34 m	Lee Doran; GBR | 72.56 m	Vítězslav Veselý; CZE | 69.89 m
Women's 200m (+0.9 m/s)	Blessing Okagbare; NGR | 22.55	Shelly-Ann Fraser-Pryce; JAM | 22.72	Ivet Lalova-Collio; BUL | 23.02	Mariya Ryemyen; UKR | 23.07	Anyika Onuora; GBR | 23.13	Sherone Simpson; JAM | DQ	Carmelita Jeter; USA | 23.36	Anthonique Strachan; BAH | DQ
Women's 400m	Christine Ohuruogu; GBR | 50.63	Amantle Montsho; BOT | 50.64	Novlene Williams-Mills; JAM | 51.03	Natasha Hastings; USA | 51.44	Stephenie Ann McPherson; JAM | 51.61	Regina George; NGR | 52.15	Rebecca Alexander; USA | 53.22	Ebonie Floyd; USA | 55.91
Women's 1500m	Abeba Aregawi; SWE | 4:03.70	Nancy Jebet Langat; KEN | 4:04.53	Yekaterina Sharmina; RUS | DQ	Laura Weightman; GBR | 4:06.22	Nicole Sifuentes; CAN | 4:06.45	Susan Krumins; NED | 4:06.84	Hannah England; GBR | 4:07.23	Laura Muir; GBR | 4:07.76
Women's 100mH (-0.5 m/s)	Dawn Harper-Nelson; USA | 12.64	Kellie Wells; USA | 12.67	Tiffany Porter; GBR | 12.72	Sally Pearson; AUS | 12.73	Kristi Castlin; USA | 12.80	Andrea Bliss; JAM | 13.01	Lucie Škrobáková; CZE | 13.08	LaVonne Idlette; DOM | 13.30
Women's 3000mSC	Milcah Chemos; KEN | 9:17.43	Sofia Assefa; ETH | 9:17.97	Hiwot Ayalew; ETH | 9:18.83	Lidya Chepkurui; KEN | 9:23.00	Etenesh Diro; ETH | 9:28.90	Purity Kirui; KEN | 9:32.16	Fancy Cherotich; KEN | 9:43.23	Ancuţa Bobocel; ROU | 9:46.03
Women's Pole Vault	Yarisley Silva; CUB | 4.73 m	Fabiana Murer; BRA | 4.63 m	Jennifer Suhr; USA | 4.53 m	Anna Rogowska; POL | 4.53 m	Mary Saxer; USA | 4.38 m	Martina Strutz; GER | 4.38 m	Nikoleta Kyriakopoulou; GRE | 4.38 m	Alana Boyd; AUS | NH m
Women's Discus Throw	Sandra Perković; CRO | 64.32 m	Gia Lewis-Smallwood; USA | 62.46 m	Anna Rüh; GER | 62.14 m	Dani Stevens; AUS | 61.28 m	Melina Robert-Michon; FRA | 59.50 m	Nadine Müller; GER | 58.87 m	Żaneta Glanc; POL | 58.82 m	Jade Lally; GBR | 58.54 m

Lausanne
Event	1st +4 pts	2nd +2 pts	3rd +1 pts	4th ⠀	5th ⠀	6th ⠀	7th ⠀	8th ⠀
Men's 100m (+2.0 m/s)	Asafa Powell; JAM | DQ	Michael Rodgers; USA | 9.96	Kim Collins; SKN | 9.97	Nickel Ashmeade; JAM | 10.05	Kemar Bailey-Cole; JAM | 10.05	Jimmy Vicaut; FRA | 10.11	Richard Thompson; TTO | 10.14	Tyson Gay; USA | DQ
Men's 800m	Mohammed Aman; ETH | 1:43.33	Pierre-Ambroise Bosse; FRA | 1:44.11	Marcin Lewandowski; POL | 1:44.31	Nijel Amos; BOT | 1:44.71	Brandon Johnson; USA | 1:45.03	Rafith Rodríguez; COL | 1:45.07	Andrew Osagie; GBR | 1:46.59	Nicholas Kiplangat Kipkoech; KEN | DNF
Men's 5000m	Yenew Alamirew; ETH | 13:06.69	Hagos Gebrhiwet; ETH | 13:07.11	Muktar Edris; ETH | 13:08.23	Moses Ndiema Kipsiro; UGA | 13:11.56	Aweke Ayalew; BRN | 13:12.15	Tariku Bekele; ETH | 13:13.61	Birhan Nebebew; ETH | 13:14.60	Yigrem Demelash; ETH | 13:16.84
Men's 400mH	Javier Culson; PUR | 48.14	Félix Sánchez; DOM | 48.58	Mamadou Kasse Hann; SEN | 48.72	Justin Gaymon; USA | 48.81	Omar Cisneros; CUB | 48.95	Jehue Gordon; TTO | 49.06	Bershawn Jackson; USA | 49.07	Michael Tinsley; USA | 49.63
Men's High Jump	Bohdan Bondarenko; UKR | 2.41 m	Erik Kynard; USA | 2.37 m	Dusty Jonas; USA | 2.30 m	Daniil Tsyplakov; RUS | 2.30 m	Derek Drouin; CAN | 2.30 m	Mickaël Hanany; FRA | 2.30 m	Aleksey Dmitrik; RUS | 2.27 m	Robbie Grabarz; GBR | 2.24 m
Men's Pole Vault	Konstantinos Filippidis; GRE | 5.72 m	Raphael Holzdeppe; GER | 5.62 m	Malte Mohr; GER | 5.62 m	Augusto Dutra; BRA | 5.62 m	Björn Otto; GER | 5.52 m	Brad Walker; USA | 5.52 m	Renaud Lavillenie; FRA | NH m	Hendrik Gruber; GER | NH m
Men's Triple Jump	Pedro Pichardo; CUB | 17.58 m	Teddy Tamgho; FRA | 17.40 m	Christian Taylor; USA | 17.13 m	Yoann Rapinier; FRA | 17.02 m	Fabrizio Donato; ITA | 16.86 m	Jonathan Henrique Silva; BRA | 16.68 m	Alexander Hochuli; SUI | 16.47 m	Ernesto Revé; CUB | NM m
Men's Shot Put	Ryan Whiting; USA | 21.88 m	Reese Hoffa; USA | 21.58 m	Dylan Armstrong; CAN | 20.75 m	Ladislav Prášil; CZE | 20.36 m	Tomasz Majewski; POL | 20.26 m	Joe Kovacs; USA | 20.02 m	Cory Martin; USA | 19.83 m	Tom Walsh; NZL | 19.61 m
Men's Javelin Throw	Kim Amb; SWE | 82.65 m	Andreas Thorkildsen; NOR | 81.54 m	Stuart Farquhar; NZL | 80.42 m	Roman Avramenko; UKR | 80.41 m	Antti Ruuskanen; FIN | 79.79 m	Uladzimir Kazlou; BLR | 78.42 m	Łukasz Grzeszczuk; POL | 78.22 m	Oleksandr Pyatnytsya; UKR | DQ
Women's 200m (+1.4 m/s)	Mariya Ryemyen; UKR | 22.61	LaShauntea Moore; USA | 22.67	Kimberlyn Duncan; USA | 22.73	Patricia Hall; JAM | 22.77	Carmelita Jeter; USA | 22.77	Lauryn Williams; USA | 22.94	Hrystyna Stuy; UKR | 23.03	Lea Sprunger; SUI | 23.36
Women's 400m	Francena McCorory; USA | 50.36	Amantle Montsho; BOT | 50.37	Novlene Williams-Mills; JAM | 50.87	Christine Ohuruogu; GBR | 51.03	Natasha Hastings; USA | 51.08	Joanna Atkins; USA | 51.41	Regina George; NGR | 52.32	Marie Gayot; FRA | 52.48
Women's 1500m	Abeba Aregawi; SWE | 4:02.11	Sifan Hassan; ETH | 4:03.73	Siham Hilali; MAR | 4:04.58	Rababe Arafi; MAR | 4:05.93	Shannon Rowbury; USA | 4:06.81	Gabriele Grunewald; USA | 4:07.46	Sheila Reid; CAN | 4:08.18	Lea Wallace; USA | 4:09.13
Women's 100mH (+1.2 m/s)	Dawn Harper-Nelson; USA | 12.53	Kellie Wells; USA | 12.58	Lolo Jones; USA | 12.60	Nia Ali; USA | 12.63	Tiffany Porter; GBR | 12.65	Kristi Castlin; USA | 12.68	Sally Pearson; AUS | 12.69	Vashti Thomas; USA | 12.89
Women's 3000mSC	Hiwot Ayalew; ETH | 9:17.66	Sofia Assefa; ETH | 9:17.69	Etenesh Diro; ETH | 9:24.40	Almaz Ayana; ETH | 9:35.08	Ancuţa Bobocel; ROU | 9:37.35	Diana Martín; ESP | 9:46.25	Birtukan Adamu; ETH | 9:46.52	Ashley Higginson; USA | 9:49.62
Women's Long Jump	Blessing Okagbare; NGR | 6.98 m	Brittney Reese; USA | 6.96 m	Shara Proctor; GBR | 6.92 m	Éloyse Lesueur-Aymonin; FRA | 6.75 m	Yelena Sokolova; RUS | 6.70 m	Irene Pusterla; SUI | 6.45 m	Chelsea Hayes; USA | 6.32 m	Funmi Jimoh; USA | DNS m
Women's Discus Throw	Sandra Perković; CRO | 68.96 m	Yarelis Barrios; CUB | 67.36 m	Zinaida Sendriutė; LTU | 63.82 m	Yaimé Pérez; CUB | 63.51 m	Dani Stevens; AUS | 63.02 m	Melina Robert-Michon; FRA | 62.44 m	Żaneta Glanc; POL | 62.41 m	Gia Lewis-Smallwood; USA | 60.24 m

Paris
Event	1st +4 pts	2nd +2 pts	3rd +1 pts	4th ⠀	5th ⠀	6th ⠀	7th ⠀	8th ⠀
Men's 200m (+0.2 m/s)	Usain Bolt; JAM | 19.73	Warren Weir; JAM | 19.92	Christophe Lemaitre; FRA | 20.07	Jason Young; JAM | 20.12	Nickel Ashmeade; JAM | 20.21	Jimmy Vicaut; FRA | 20.30	Maurice Mitchell; USA | 20.61	Méba Mickaël Zeze; FRA | 21.29
Men's 400m	Kirani James; GRN | 43.96	LaShawn Merritt; USA | 44.09	Tony McQuay; USA | 44.84	David Verburg; USA | 44.97	Pavel Maslák; CZE | 45.13	Christopher Brown; BAH | 45.24	Calvin Smith; USA | 45.33	Mame-Ibra Anne; FRA | 45.73
Men's 1500m	Ayanleh Souleiman; DJI | 3:32.55	Aman Wote; ETH | 3:32.65	Leonel Manzano; USA | 3:33.14	Mohamed Moustaoui; MAR | 3:33.18	Lawi Lalang; KEN | 3:33.20	Benson Seurei; BRN | 3:33.33	Florian Carvalho de Fonsesco; FRA | 3:33.47	Bouabdellah Tahri; FRA | 3:33.89
Men's 110mH (0.0 m/s)	Aries Merritt; USA | 13.09	Pascal Martinot-Lagarde; FRA | 13.12	David Oliver; USA | 13.13	Andrew Riley; JAM | 13.14	Ryan Brathwaite; BAR | 13.14	Ryan Wilson; USA | 13.15	Jason Richardson; USA | 13.22	Thomas Martinot-Lagarde; FRA | 13.26
Men's 3000mSC	Ezekiel Kemboi; KEN | 7:59.03	Mahiedine Mekhissi; FRA | 8:00.09	Paul Kipsiele Koech; KEN | 8:09.17	Roba Gari; ETH | 8:12.22	Benjamin Kiplagat; UGA | 8:13.07	Noureddine Smaïl; FRA | 8:15.89	Hamid Ezzine; MAR | 8:17.67	Yoann Kowal; FRA | 8:20.41
Men's Pole Vault	Renaud Lavillenie; FRA | 5.92 m	Jan Kudlička; CZE | 5.70 m	Konstantinos Filippidis; GRE | 5.70 m	Raphael Holzdeppe; GER | 5.60 m	Brad Walker; USA | 5.60 m	Steven Lewis; GBR | 5.60 m	Augusto Dutra; BRA | 5.60 m	Valentin Lavillenie; FRA | 5.45 m
Men's Long Jump	Damar Forbes; JAM | 8.11 m	Chris Tomlinson; GBR | 8.08 m	Louis Tsatoumas; GRE | 8.02 m	Greg Rutherford; GBR | 7.99 m	Ignisious Gaisah; NED | 7.96 m	Godfrey Khotso Mokoena; RSA | 7.87 m	Kafétien Gomis; FRA | 7.86 m	Michel Tornéus; SWE | 7.82 m
Men's Discus Throw	Robert Harting; GER | 67.04 m	Ehsan Hadadi; IRI | 65.53 m	Gerd Kanter; EST | 65.30 m	Vikas Gowda; IND | 64.45 m	Frank Casanas; ESP | 63.89 m	Robert Urbanek; POL | 63.33 m	Erik Cadée; NED | 62.97 m	Benn Harradine; AUS | 62.62 m
Women's 100m (-0.2 m/s)	Shelly-Ann Fraser-Pryce; JAM | 10.92	Blessing Okagbare; NGR | 10.93	Murielle Ahouré-Demps; CIV | 11.01	Kelly-Ann Baptiste; TTO | DQ	English Gardner; USA | 11.13	Ivet Lalova-Collio; BUL | 11.20	Shalonda Solomon; USA | 11.21	Mariya Ryemyen; UKR | 11.29
Women's 800m	Francine Niyonsaba; BDI | 1:57.26	Malika Akkaoui; MAR | 1:57.64	Alysia Montaño; USA | 1:57.75	Kate Grace; USA | 1:59.47	Marilyn Okoro; GBR | 1:59.76	Siham Hilali; MAR | 2:00.15	Marina Arzamasova; BLR | 2:00.70	Ajee Wilson; USA | 2:00.90
Women's 5000m	Tirunesh Dibaba; ETH | 14:23.68	Almaz Ayana; ETH | 14:25.84	Gelete Burka; ETH | 14:42.07	Sule Utura; ETH | 14:59.74	Buze Diriba; ETH | 15:01.44	Molly Huddle; USA | 15:10.56	Alemitu Haroye; ETH | 15:11.78	Genet Yalew; ETH | 15:12.05
Women's 400mH	Zuzana Hejnová; CZE | 53.23	Perri Shakes-Drayton; GBR | 53.96	Georganne Moline; USA | 54.19	Denisa Rosolová; CZE | 54.38	Kaliese Carter; JAM | 55.22	Ristananna Tracey; JAM | 55.33	Phara Anacharsis; FRA | 56.55	
Women's High Jump	Anna Chicherova; RUS | 2.01 m	Brigetta Barrett; USA | 1.98 m	Blanka Vlašić; CRO | 1.98 m	Emma Green; SWE | 1.92 m	Ana Šimić; CRO | 1.92 m	Inika McPherson; USA | 1.92 m	Nadiya Dusanova; UZB | 1.89 m	Ebba Jungmark; SWE | 1.85 m
Women's Triple Jump	Caterine Ibarguen; COL | 14.69 m	Hanna Minenko; ISR | 14.58 m	Olha Saladukha; UKR | 14.55 m	Kimberly Williams; JAM | 14.48 m	Irina Gumenyuk; RUS | 14.07 m	Dana Velďáková; SVK | 13.91 m	Yekaterina Kayukova-Chernenko; RUS | 13.89 m	Teresa Nzola Meso; FRA | 13.82 m
Women's Shot Put	Valerie Adams; NZL | 20.62 m	Michelle Carter; USA | 19.57 m	Nadine Kleinert; GER | 17.95 m	Melissa Boekelman; NED | 17.65 m	Yuliya Leantsiuk; BLR | 17.55 m	Úrsula Ruiz; ESP | 17.17 m	Jessica Cérival; FRA | 17.04 m	
Women's Javelin Throw	Christina Obergföll; GER | 64.74 m	Kimberley Mickle; AUS | 64.35 m	Madara Palameika; LAT | 61.36 m	Kathryn Mitchell; AUS | 60.86 m	Martina Ratej; SLO | DQ	Mercedes Chilla; ESP | 55.99 m	Sinta Sprudzāne; LAT | 55.97 m	Mathilde Andraud; FRA | 53.20 m

Monaco
Event	1st +4 pts	2nd +2 pts	3rd +1 pts	4th ⠀	5th ⠀	6th ⠀	7th ⠀	8th ⠀
Men's 100m (-0.4 m/s)	Justin Gatlin; USA | 9.94	Dentarius Locke; USA | 9.96	Jimmy Vicaut; FRA | 9.99	Michael Rodgers; USA | 10.07	Kim Collins; SKN | 10.08	Kemar Bailey-Cole; JAM | 10.10	Nickel Ashmeade; JAM | 10.13	Charles Silmon; USA | 10.20
Men's 800m	Duane Solomon; USA | 1:43.72	Pierre-Ambroise Bosse; FRA | 1:43.76	Kevin López; ESP | 1:43.93	Marcin Lewandowski; POL | 1:44.20	Rafith Rodríguez; COL | 1:44.33	Tyler Mulder; USA | 1:44.34	Timothy Kitum; KEN | 1:44.45	Ferguson Cheruiyot Rotich; KEN | 1:44.89
Men's 5000m	Edwin Cheruiyot Soi; KEN | 12:51.34	Albert Rop; BRN | 12:51.96	Isiah Kiplangat Koech; KEN | 12:56.08	Thomas Pkemei Longosiwa; KEN | 12:59.81	Lawi Lalang; KEN | 13:00.95	Galen Rupp; USA | 13:05.17	Augustine Kiprono Choge; KEN | 13:11.02	Ben True; USA | 13:13.98
Men's 400mH	Jehue Gordon; TTO | 48.00	Johnny Dutch; USA | 48.20	Javier Culson; PUR | 48.35	Mamadou Kasse Hann; SEN | 48.50	Justin Gaymon; USA | 48.64	Félix Sánchez; DOM | 48.83	Kerron Clement; USA | 48.93	Mickael Francois; FRA | 51.61
Men's Pole Vault	Renaud Lavillenie; FRA | 5.96 m	Brad Walker; USA | 5.78 m	Björn Otto; GER | 5.70 m	Lázaro Borges; CUB | 5.70 m	Jan Kudlička; CZE | 5.70 m	Steven Lewis; GBR | 5.70 m	Changrui Xue; CHN | 5.60 m	Giuseppe Gibilisco; ITA | 5.40 m
Men's Triple Jump	Christian Taylor; USA | 17.30 m	Daniele Greco; ITA | 17.25 m	Pedro Pichardo; CUB | 16.94 m	Fabrizio Donato; ITA | 16.84 m	Aleksey Fyodorov; RUS | 16.72 m	Yoann Rapinier; FRA | 16.57 m	Omar Craddock; USA | 16.15 m	Will Claye; USA | DNS m
Men's Javelin Throw	Vítězslav Veselý; CZE | 87.68 m	Dmitriy Tarabin; RUS | 84.33 m	Andreas Thorkildsen; NOR | 83.71 m	Roman Avramenko; UKR | 83.52 m	Kim Amb; SWE | 80.71 m	Zigismunds Sirmais; LAT | 75.79 m	Oleksandr Pyatnytsya; UKR | DQ	
Women's 200m (-0.5 m/s)	Murielle Ahouré-Demps; CIV | 22.24	Tiffany Townsend; USA | 22.26	Shelly-Ann Fraser-Pryce; JAM | 22.28	Kimberlyn Duncan; USA | 22.46	Jeneba Tarmoh; USA | 22.72	Charonda Williams; USA | 22.77	Ana Claudia Lemos; BRA | 23.06	Carmelita Jeter; USA | DNS
Women's 400m	Amantle Montsho; BOT | 49.33	Stephenie Ann McPherson; JAM | 49.92	Francena McCorory; USA | 49.96	Rose-Marie Whyte-Robinson; JAM | 50.86	Floria Guei; FRA | 51.58	Anyika Onuora; GBR | 51.63	Shericka Williams; JAM | 51.95	Novlene Williams-Mills; JAM | DNF
Women's 1500m	Jenny Simpson; USA | 4:00.48	Hellen Obiri; KEN | 4:00.93	Brenda Martinez; USA | 4:00.94	Shannon Rowbury; USA | 4:01.28	Gabriele Grunewald; USA | 4:01.48	Viola Jelagat Kibiwot; KEN | 4:02.50	Mimi Belete; BRN | 4:03.63	Nancy Jebet Langat; KEN | 4:03.91
Women's 100mH (-0.5 m/s)	Queen Claye; USA | 12.64	Yvette Lewis; USA | 12.69	Kellie Wells; USA | 12.70	Tiffany Porter; GBR | 12.70	Sally Pearson; AUS | 12.75	Nia Ali; USA | 12.79	Cindy Billaud; FRA | 12.91	
Women's 3000mSC	Milcah Chemos; KEN | 9:14.17	Lidya Chepkurui; KEN | 9:15.18	Fancy Cherotich; KEN | 9:36.82	Shalaya Kipp; USA | 9:37.23	Eilish McColgan; GBR | 9:45.72	Jamie Cheever; USA | 9:49.48	Claire Perraux; FRA | 9:51.95	Clarisse Cruz; POR | 10:24.47
Women's High Jump	Brigetta Barrett; USA | 2.01 m	Anna Chicherova; RUS | 1.98 m	Blanka Vlašić; CRO | 1.98 m	Emma Green; SWE | 1.95 m	Ruth Beitia; ESP | 1.92 m	Ana Šimić; CRO | 1.92 m	Levern Spencer; LCA | 1.92 m	Ebba Jungmark; SWE | 1.89 m
Women's Long Jump	Blessing Okagbare; NGR | 7.04 m	Darya Klishina; RUS | 6.98 m	Shara Proctor; GBR | 6.74 m	Lauma Grīva; LAT | 6.64 m	Tori Bowie; USA | 6.63 m	Tori Polk; USA | 6.54 m	Funmi Jimoh; USA | 6.36 m	Blessing Okagbare; NGR | 7.00 m
Women's Discus Throw	Sandra Perković; CRO | 65.30 m	Yarelis Barrios; CUB | 64.24 m	Gia Lewis-Smallwood; USA | 63.63 m	Zinaida Sendriutė; LTU | 61.67 m	Dani Stevens; AUS | 61.32 m	Nadine Müller; GER | 60.51 m	Melina Robert-Michon; FRA | 59.49 m	Irina Rodrigues; POR | 56.35 m

London
Event	1st +4 pts	2nd +2 pts	3rd +1 pts	4th ⠀	5th ⠀	6th ⠀	7th ⠀	8th ⠀
Men's 200m (+0.2 m/s)	Warren Weir; JAM | 19.89	Jason Young; JAM | 19.99	Wallace Spearmon; USA | 20.18	Christophe Lemaitre; FRA | 20.23	Jimmy Vicaut; FRA | 20.44	Churandy Martina; NED | 20.49	Richard Kilty; GBR | 20.57	James Ellington; GBR | 20.62
Men's 400m	Kirani James; GRN | 44.65	Tony McQuay; USA | 45.09	Jonathan Borlée; BEL | 45.14	Youssef Ahmed Masrahi; KSA | 45.40	Luguelín Santos; DOM | 45.43	Nigel Levine; GBR | 45.58	Kévin Borlée; BEL | 45.59	Pavel Maslák; CZE | 45.80
Men's Mile	Augustine Kiprono Choge; KEN | 3:50.01	Ayanleh Souleiman; DJI | 3:50.07	James Kiplagat Magut; KEN | 3:50.93	Daniel Kipchirchir Komen; KEN | 3:51.28	Galen Rupp; USA | 3:52.11	Mohamed Moustaoui; MAR | 3:52.42	Jordan McNamara; USA | 3:52.42	David Torrence; USA | 3:52.74
Men's 110mH (+0.3 m/s)	David Oliver; USA | 13.20	William Sharman; GBR | 13.26	Artur Noga; POL | 13.31	Ryan Wilson; USA | 13.37	Dwight Thomas; JAM | 13.53	Jeff Porter; USA | 13.58	Thomas Martinot-Lagarde; FRA | 13.73	Aries Merritt; USA | DQ
Men's 3000mSC	Brimin Kiprop Kipruto; KEN | 8:06.86	Gilbert Kirui; KEN | 8:06.96	Jairus Kipchoge Birech; KEN | 8:12.51	Clement Kimutai Kemboi; KEN | 8:19.83	Matthew Hughes; CAN | 8:20.49	De'Sean Turner; USA | 8:31.25	Andrew Poore; USA | 8:33.62	Chris Winter; CAN | 8:34.82
Men's High Jump	Bohdan Bondarenko; UKR | 2.38 m	Erik Kynard; USA | 2.36 m	Mutaz Essa Barshim; QAT | 2.24 m	Mickaël Hanany; FRA | 2.24 m	Robbie Grabarz; GBR | 2.24 m	Marco Fassinotti; ITA | 2.20 m	Allan Smith; GBR | 2.20 m	Tom Parsons; GBR | 2.20 m
Men's Long Jump	Aleksandr Menkov; RUS | 8.31 m	Fabrice Lapierre; AUS | 8.17 m	Mauro Vinicius da Silva; BRA | 8.00 m	Luis Alberto Rivera Morales; MEX | 8.00 m	Chris Tomlinson; GBR | 7.99 m	JJ Jegede; GBR | 7.92 m	Dwight Phillips; USA | 7.89 m	Alyn Camara; GER | 7.83 m
Men's Discus Throw	Piotr Małachowski; POL | 67.35 m	Martin Wierig; GER | 66.60 m	Gerd Kanter; EST | 66.29 m	Erik Cadée; NED | 65.37 m	Ehsan Hadadi; IRI | 64.88 m	Brett Morse; GBR | 64.84 m	Frank Casanas; ESP | 64.19 m	Vikas Gowda; IND | 63.49 m
Women's 100m (+1.1 m/s)	Blessing Okagbare; NGR | 10.79	Barbara Pierre; USA | 10.85	Kelly-Ann Baptiste; TTO | DQ	Shelly-Ann Fraser-Pryce; JAM | 10.94	Murielle Ahouré-Demps; CIV | 10.95	Kerron Stewart; JAM | 11.02	English Gardner; USA | 11.08	Carmelita Jeter; USA | DNS
Women's 800m	Brenda Martinez; USA | 1:58.19	Elena Mirela Lavric; ROU | 1:59.79	Ajee Wilson; USA | 2:00.20	Marilyn Okoro; GBR | 2:00.35	Angela Petty; NZL | 2:00.42	Rose-Anne Galligan; IRL | 2:00.58	Melissa Bishop-Nriagu; CAN | 2:00.72	Jessica Smith; CAN | 2:00.82
Women's 3000m	Shannon Rowbury; USA | 8:41.46	Gabriele Grunewald; USA | 8:42.64	Molly Huddle; USA | 8:42.99	Sheila Reid; CAN | 8:44.02	Jordan Hogan; USA | 8:46.89	Kim Conley; USA | 8:47.95	Chelsea Sodaro; USA | 8:48.30	Brianna Felnagle; USA | 8:52.59
Women's 400mH	Zuzana Hejnová; CZE | 53.07	Perri Shakes-Drayton; GBR | 53.67	Georganne Moline; USA | 54.32	Kori Carter; USA | 54.83	Kaliese Carter; JAM | 54.88	Anna Ryzhykova; UKR | 55.09	Ristananna Tracey; JAM | 55.55	Dalilah Muhammad; USA | 55.56
Women's Pole Vault	Yarisley Silva; CUB | 4.83 m	Jennifer Suhr; USA | 4.73 m	Fabiana Murer; BRA | 4.63 m	Silke Spiegelburg; GER | 4.63 m	Kylie Hutson; USA | 4.53 m	Mary Saxer; USA | 4.53 m	Anna Rogowska; POL | 4.40 m	Sally Peake; GBR | 4.00 m
Women's Triple Jump	Yekaterina Koneva; RUS | 14.52 m	Kimberly Williams; JAM | 14.38 m	Hanna Minenko; ISR | 14.29 m	Dana Velďáková; SVK | 13.94 m	Snežana Vukmirovič; SLO | 13.86 m	Keila Costa; BRA | 13.77 m	Yamilé Aldama; GBR | 13.25 m	Athanasia Perra; GRE | NM m
Women's Shot Put	Valerie Adams; NZL | 20.90 m	Christina Schwanitz; GER | 19.74 m	Michelle Carter; USA | 19.24 m	Alena Abramchuk; BLR | 18.86 m	Josephine Terlecki; GER | 18.24 m	Tia Brooks-Wannemacher; USA | 17.68 m	Natalia Ducó; CHI | 17.49 m	Shanice Craft; GER | 17.22 m
Women's Javelin Throw	Christina Obergföll; GER | 65.61 m	Mariya Abakumova; RUS | 64.48 m	Kimberley Mickle; AUS | 63.05 m	Kathryn Mitchell; AUS | 61.45 m	Linda Stahl; GER | 60.45 m	Sofi Flink; SWE | 54.18 m	Brittany Borman; USA | 54.02 m	Izzy Jeffs; GBR | 51.65 m

Stockholm
Event	1st +4 pts	2nd +2 pts	3rd +1 pts	4th ⠀	5th ⠀	6th ⠀	7th ⠀	8th ⠀
Men's 200m (-0.6 m/s)	Serhiy Smelyk; UKR | 20.54	Jaysuma Saidy Ndure; NOR | 20.58	Rasheed Dwyer; JAM | 20.64	James Ellington; GBR | 20.71	Isiah Young; USA | 20.91	Mario Forsythe; JAM | 20.97	Bruno Hortelano-Roig; ESP | 21.15	Curtis Mitchell; USA | DNF
Men's 400m	LaShawn Merritt; USA | 44.69	Luguelín Santos; DOM | 45.25	Pavel Maslák; CZE | 45.33	Josh Mance; USA | 46.08	Nigel Levine; GBR | 46.20	Nick Ekelund-Arenander; DEN | 46.38	Johan Wissman; SWE | 46.97	Richard Strachan; GBR | 47.44
Men's 1500m	Ayanleh Souleiman; DJI | 3:33.59	Silas Kiplagat; KEN | 3:33.92	Nixon Kiplimo Chepseba; KEN | 3:34.05	Caleb Mwangangi Ndiku; KEN | 3:34.85	Mohamed Moustaoui; MAR | 3:35.28	Asbel Kiprop; KEN | 3:35.49	Henrik Ingebrigtsen; NOR | 3:37.30	Bethwell Birgen; KEN | 3:37.51
Men's 110mH (+0.1 m/s)	David Oliver; USA | 13.21	Sergey Shubenkov; RUS | 13.35	William Sharman; GBR | 13.36	Jason Richardson; USA | 13.37	Artur Noga; POL | 13.40	Ryan Wilson; USA | 13.60	Mikel Thomas; TTO | 13.74	
Men's 3000mSC	Hilal Yego; KEN | 8:09.81	Gilbert Kirui; KEN | 8:11.55	Conseslus Kipruto; KEN | 8:12.35	Paul Kipsiele Koech; KEN | 8:12.60	Jairus Kipchoge Birech; KEN | 8:15.01	John Kibet Koech; KEN | 8:16.96	Daniel Huling; USA | 8:21.92	Matthew Hughes; CAN | 8:25.19
Men's Long Jump	Aleksandr Menkov; RUS | 8.18 m	Godfrey Khotso Mokoena; RSA | 8.06 m	Eusebio Cáceres; ESP | 8.00 m	Tyrone Smith; BER | 7.94 m	Michel Tornéus; SWE | 7.94 m	Luis Alberto Rivera Morales; MEX | 7.87 m	Chris Tomlinson; GBR | 7.87 m	Ignisious Gaisah; NED | 7.80 m
Men's Discus Throw	Piotr Małachowski; POL | 65.86 m	Ehsan Hadadi; IRI | 63.64 m	Martin Wierig; GER | 63.20 m	Gerd Kanter; EST | 62.93 m	Robert Urbanek; POL | 62.80 m	Vikas Gowda; IND | 61.66 m	Niklas Arrhenius; SWE | 59.33 m	Leif Arrhenius; SWE | 58.27 m
Women's 100m (-0.5 m/s)	Kerron Stewart; JAM | 11.24	Alexandria Anderson; USA | 11.25	Barbara Pierre; USA | 11.29	Jeneba Tarmoh; USA | 11.38	Mariely Sánchez; DOM | 11.43	Irene Ekelund; SWE | 11.45	Schillonie Calvert-Powell; JAM | 11.49	Ezinne Okparaebo; NOR | 11.51
Women's 800m	Eunice Jepkoech Sum; KEN | 1:58.84	Alysia Montaño; USA | 1:58.96	Malika Akkaoui; MAR | 1:59.74	Ajee Wilson; USA | 1:59.96	Ekaterina Guliyev; RUS | 2:00.63	Abeba Aregawi; SWE | 2:01.22	Brenda Martinez; USA | 2:01.54	Aníta Hinriksdóttir; ISL | 2:02.17
Women's 3000m	Meseret Defar; ETH | 8:30.29	Mercy Cherono; KEN | 8:31.23	Sifan Hassan; ETH | 8:32.53	Viola Jelagat Kibiwot; KEN | 8:33.97	Gladys Cherono; KEN | 8:34.05	Hellen Obiri; KEN | 8:34.25	Shannon Rowbury; USA | 8:34.43	Genzebe Dibaba; ETH | 8:37.00
Women's 400mH	Zuzana Hejnová; CZE | 53.70	Kaliese Carter; JAM | 54.88	Dalilah Muhammad; USA | 55.74	Hanna Titimets; UKR | DQ	Anna Ryzhykova; UKR | 55.94	Meghan Beesley; GBR | 56.22	Natalya Antyukh; RUS | DQ	Georganne Moline; USA | 57.05
Women's High Jump	Anna Chicherova; RUS | 1.98 m	Svetlana Shkolina; RUS | DQ	Mariya Lasitskene; RUS | 1.94 m	Kamila Lićwinko; POL | 1.90 m	Justyna Kasprzycka; POL | 1.90 m	Emma Green; SWE | 1.90 m	Brigetta Barrett; USA | 1.90 m	Irina Gordeyeva; RUS | 1.85 m
Women's Pole Vault	Silke Spiegelburg; GER | 4.69 m	Yarisley Silva; CUB | 4.59 m	Fabiana Murer; BRA | 4.59 m	Jennifer Suhr; USA | 4.59 m	Anastasiya Savchenko; RUS | 4.49 m	Jiřina Ptáčníková; CZE | 4.49 m	Lisa Ryzih; GER | 4.49 m	Angelica Bengtsson; SWE | 4.39 m
Women's Triple Jump	Caterine Ibarguen; COL | 14.61 m	Olha Saladukha; UKR | 14.07 m	Hanna Minenko; ISR | 13.95 m	Anna Pyatykh; RUS | DQ	Kimberly Williams; JAM | 13.84 m	Snežana Vukmirovič; SLO | 13.72 m	Irina Gumenyuk; RUS | 13.70 m	Angelica Ström; SWE | 12.55 m
Women's Shot Put	Valerie Adams; NZL | 20.30 m	Christina Schwanitz; GER | 19.26 m	Michelle Carter; USA | 18.56 m	Natalia Ducó; CHI | 17.59 m	Alena Abramchuk; BLR | 17.59 m	Tia Brooks-Wannemacher; USA | 17.56 m	Halyna Obleshchuk; UKR | 17.31 m	Catarina Andersson; SWE | 15.58 m
Women's Javelin Throw	Mariya Abakumova; RUS | 68.59 m	Linda Stahl; GER | 63.75 m	Christina Obergföll; GER | 62.36 m	Kathryn Mitchell; AUS | 60.63 m	Sofi Flink; SWE | 59.66 m	Sunette Viljoen; RSA | 59.45 m	Vera Markaryan; UKR | 57.03 m	Viktoriya Sudarushkina; RUS | 56.94 m

Zurich
Event	1st +8 pts	2nd +4 pts	3rd +2 pts	4th ⠀	5th ⠀	6th ⠀	7th ⠀	8th ⠀
Men's 100m (-0.3 m/s)	Usain Bolt; JAM | 9.90	Nickel Ashmeade; JAM | 9.94	Justin Gatlin; USA | 9.96	Jimmy Vicaut; FRA | 9.98	Michael Rodgers; USA | 10.00	Nesta Carter; JAM | 10.01	Kemar Bailey-Cole; JAM | 10.02	Adam Gemili; GBR | 10.06
Men's 400m	LaShawn Merritt; USA | 44.13	Kirani James; GRN | 44.32	Pavel Maslák; CZE | 44.91	Luguelín Santos; DOM | 44.93	Youssef Ahmed Masrahi; KSA | 45.26	Jonathan Borlée; BEL | 45.26	Kévin Borlée; BEL | 45.59	Nigel Levine; GBR | 45.66
Men's 1500m	Silas Kiplagat; KEN | 3:30.97	Ayanleh Souleiman; DJI | 3:31.64	Nixon Kiplimo Chepseba; KEN | 3:33.15	Caleb Mwangangi Ndiku; KEN | 3:33.41	Mekonnen Gebremedhin; ETH | 3:33.64	Asbel Kiprop; KEN | 3:33.78	Henrik Ingebrigtsen; NOR | 3:33.95	Johan Cronje; RSA | 3:34.06
Men's 110mH (-0.5 m/s)	David Oliver; USA | 13.12	Ryan Wilson; USA | 13.24	Jason Richardson; USA | 13.26	Sergey Shubenkov; RUS | 13.27	Artur Noga; POL | 13.29	Aries Merritt; USA | 13.34	Dayron Robles; CUB | 13.37	William Sharman; GBR | 13.42
Men's 3000mSC	Hilal Yego; KEN | 8:08.03	Jairus Kipchoge Birech; KEN | 8:08.72	Conseslus Kipruto; KEN | 8:10.76	Mahiedine Mekhissi; FRA | 8:11.11	Gilbert Kirui; KEN | 8:12.93	Paul Kipsiele Koech; KEN | 8:24.19	Brimin Kiprop Kipruto; KEN | 8:25.85	Matthew Hughes; CAN | 8:33.00
Men's High Jump	Bohdan Bondarenko; UKR | 2.33 m	Konstantinos Baniotis; GRE | 2.33 m	Mutaz Essa Barshim; QAT | 2.33 m	Derek Drouin; CAN | 2.28 m	Donald Thomas; BAH | 2.28 m	Mickaël Hanany; FRA | 2.24 m	Aleksandr Shustov; RUS | DQ	Ivan Ukhov; RUS | DQ
Men's Long Jump	Zarck Visser; RSA | 8.32 m	Godfrey Khotso Mokoena; RSA | 8.11 m	Luis Alberto Rivera Morales; MEX | 8.09 m	Chris Tomlinson; GBR | 7.96 m	Ignisious Gaisah; NED | 7.96 m	Aleksandr Menkov; RUS | 7.94 m	Eusebio Cáceres; ESP | 7.59 m	Dwight Phillips; USA | 7.53 m
Men's Shot Put indoor	Ryan Whiting; USA | 22.03 m	David Storl; GER | 21.19 m	Dylan Armstrong; CAN | 21.13 m	Ladislav Prášil; CZE | 21.10 m	Tomasz Majewski; POL | 20.81 m	Germán Luján Lauro; ARG | 20.53 m	Cory Martin; USA | 20.18 m	Christian Cantwell; USA | 20.13 m
Men's Discus Throw	Gerd Kanter; EST | 67.02 m	Robert Harting; GER | 66.83 m	Ehsan Hadadi; IRI | 66.07 m	Martin Wierig; GER | 65.51 m	Erik Cadée; NED | 63.81 m	Robert Urbanek; POL | 63.78 m	Piotr Małachowski; POL | 63.70 m	Viktor Butenko; RUS | 63.58 m
Women's 200m (-0.4 m/s)	Shelly-Ann Fraser-Pryce; JAM | 22.40	Murielle Ahouré-Demps; CIV | 22.66	Mariya Ryemyen; UKR | 22.67	Charonda Williams; USA | 22.84	Ivet Lalova-Collio; BUL | 23.22	Mujinga Kambundji; SUI | 23.38	Tiffany Townsend; USA | DQ	
Women's 800m	Eunice Jepkoech Sum; KEN | 1:58.82	Mariya Savinova; RUS | 1:58.93	Malika Akkaoui; MAR | 1:59.34	Alysia Montaño; USA | 2:00.25	Ajee Wilson; USA | 2:00.35	Nataliya Lupu; UKR | 2:01.09	Caster Semenya; RSA | 2:01.83	Selina Rutz-Büchel; SUI | 2:01.99
Women's 5000m	Meseret Defar; ETH | 14:32.83	Tirunesh Dibaba; ETH | 14:34.82	Mercy Cherono; KEN | 14:40.33	Emily Chebet; KEN | 14:46.89	Gladys Cherono; KEN | 14:47.12	Viola Jelagat Kibiwot; KEN | 14:52.54	Jenny Simpson; USA | 14:56.26	Buze Diriba; ETH | 14:56.34
Women's 400mH	Zuzana Hejnová; CZE | 53.32	Kaliese Carter; JAM | 54.22	Denisa Rosolová; CZE | 54.99	Hanna Titimets; UKR | DQ	Anna Ryzhykova; UKR | 55.17	Natalya Antyukh; RUS | DQ	Meghan Beesley; GBR | 55.96	Dalilah Muhammad; USA | 56.15
Women's Pole Vault	Silke Spiegelburg; GER | 4.79 m	Fabiana Murer; BRA | 4.72 m	Yarisley Silva; CUB | 4.72 m	Jiřina Ptáčníková; CZE | 4.62 m	Nikoleta Kyriakopoulou; GRE | 4.52 m	Mary Saxer; USA | 4.52 m	Kristina Gadschiew; GER | 4.52 m	Nicole Büchler; SUI | 4.52 m
Women's Long Jump	Shara Proctor; GBR | 6.88 m	Blessing Okagbare; NGR | 6.76 m	Ivana Vuleta; SRB | 6.73 m	Sosthene Moguenara-Taroum; GER | 6.68 m	Olga Kucherenko; RUS | DQ	Yelena Sokolova; RUS | 6.43 m	Brittney Reese; USA | 6.37 m	Darya Klishina; RUS | 6.34 m
Women's Shot Put indoor	Valerie Adams; NZL | 20.98 m	Yevgeniya Kolodko; RUS | DQ	Michelle Carter; USA | 19.88 m	Christina Schwanitz; GER | 19.36 m	Alena Abramchuk; BLR | 18.34 m	Tia Brooks-Wannemacher; USA | 18.20 m	Nadine Kleinert; GER | 18.13 m	Josephine Terlecki; GER | 17.48 m
Women's Javelin Throw	Mariya Abakumova; RUS | 68.94 m	Christina Obergföll; GER | 63.36 m	Linda Stahl; GER | 63.24 m	Sunette Viljoen; RSA | 62.76 m	Kathryn Mitchell; AUS | 62.66 m	Sofi Flink; SWE | 59.84 m	Katharina Molitor; GER | 57.48 m	Līna Mūze-Sirmā; LAT | 57.04 m

Brussels
Event	1st +8 pts	2nd +4 pts	3rd +2 pts	4th ⠀	5th ⠀	6th ⠀	7th ⠀	8th ⠀
Men's 200m (-0.2 m/s)	Warren Weir; JAM | 19.87	Nickel Ashmeade; JAM | 19.93	Walter Dix; USA | 20.12	Churandy Martina; NED | 20.18	Jaysuma Saidy Ndure; NOR | 20.23	Rasheed Dwyer; JAM | 20.40	Chris Clarke; GBR | 20.45	James Ellington; GBR | 20.52
Men's 5000m	Yenew Alamirew; ETH | 12:58.75	Bernard Lagat; USA | 12:58.99	Hagos Gebrhiwet; ETH | 12:59.33	Edwin Cheruiyot Soi; KEN | 13:01.00	Galen Rupp; USA | 13:01.37	Thomas Pkemei Longosiwa; KEN | 13:01.74	Albert Rop; BRN | 13:02.31	Evan Jager; USA | 13:02.40
Men's 400mH	Jehue Gordon; TTO | 48.32	Omar Cisneros; CUB | 48.59	Javier Culson; PUR | 48.60	Michael Tinsley; USA | 48.60	Leford Green; JAM | 48.84	Justin Gaymon; USA | 49.43	Mamadou Kasse Hann; SEN | 49.93	Rhys Williams; GBR | 50.13
Men's Pole Vault	Renaud Lavillenie; FRA | 5.96 m	Konstantinos Filippidis; GRE | 5.74 m	Augusto Dutra; BRA | 5.74 m	Björn Otto; GER | 5.60 m	Thiago Braz; BRA | 5.60 m	Karsten Dilla; GER | 5.50 m	Jan Kudlička; CZE | 5.50 m	Luke Cutts; GBR | 5.50 m
Men's Triple Jump	Teddy Tamgho; FRA | 17.30 m	Christian Taylor; USA | 16.89 m	Will Claye; USA | 16.88 m	Pedro Pichardo; CUB | 16.55 m	Yoann Rapinier; FRA | 16.54 m	Zlatozar Atanasov; BUL | 16.34 m	Gaetan Saku Bafuanga; FRA | 16.25 m	Fabrizio Schembri; ITA | 16.25 m
Men's Shot Put	Ryan Whiting; USA | 21.45 m	Georgi Ivanov; BUL | 20.95 m	Ladislav Prášil; CZE | 20.79 m	Dylan Armstrong; CAN | 20.76 m	Tomasz Majewski; POL | 20.76 m	Asmir Kolašinac; SRB | 20.57 m	Germán Luján Lauro; ARG | 20.54 m	Cory Martin; USA | 20.07 m
Men's Javelin Throw	Tero Pitkämäki; FIN | 87.32 m	Vítězslav Veselý; CZE | 86.67 m	Antti Ruuskanen; FIN | 83.64 m	Dmitriy Tarabin; RUS | 83.03 m	Julius Yego; KEN | 82.46 m	Andreas Thorkildsen; NOR | 82.00 m	Thomas Röhler; GER | 80.98 m	Kim Amb; SWE | 80.23 m
Women's 100m (-0.3 m/s)	Shelly-Ann Fraser-Pryce; JAM | 10.72	Alexandria Anderson; USA | 10.97	Carrie Russell; JAM | 10.99	Kerron Stewart; JAM | 11.19	Barbara Pierre; USA | 11.20	Verena Sailer; GER | 11.28	Charonda Williams; USA | 11.28	Dafne Schippers; NED | 11.31
Women's 400m	Natasha Hastings; USA | 50.36	Amantle Montsho; BOT | 50.41	Antonina Krivoshapka; RUS | DQ	Francena McCorory; USA | 50.77	Christine Ohuruogu; GBR | 50.95	Stephenie Ann McPherson; JAM | 51.18	Libania Grenot; ITA | 51.19	Novlene Williams-Mills; JAM | 51.31
Women's 1500m	Abeba Aregawi; SWE | 4:05.41	Mercy Cherono; KEN | 4:05.82	Hellen Obiri; KEN | 4:06.92	Shannon Rowbury; USA | 4:07.05	Hannah England; GBR | 4:08.31	Viola Jelagat Kibiwot; KEN | 4:08.62	Yekaterina Sharmina; RUS | DQ	Siham Hilali; MAR | 4:09.04
Women's 100mH (+1.0 m/s)	Dawn Harper-Nelson; USA | 12.48	Sally Pearson; AUS | 12.63	Cindy Billaud; FRA | 12.69	Tiffany Porter; GBR | 12.78	Kellie Wells; USA | 12.78	Yuliya Kondakova; RUS | DQ	Anne Zagré; BEL | 12.88	Reina-Flor Okori; FRA | 12.99
Women's 3000mSC	Milcah Chemos; KEN | 9:15.06	Sofia Assefa; ETH | 9:15.26	Hiwot Ayalew; ETH | 9:15.85	Lidya Chepkurui; KEN | 9:21.94	Purity Kirui; KEN | 9:24.42	Etenesh Diro; ETH | 9:28.96	Gladys Jerotich Kipkemoi; KEN | 9:36.66	Eilish McColgan; GBR | 9:39.79
Women's High Jump	Svetlana Shkolina; RUS | DQ	Anna Chicherova; RUS | 1.98 m	Emma Green; SWE | 1.96 m	Mariya Lasitskene; RUS | 1.93 m	Justyna Kasprzycka; POL | 1.90 m	Kamila Lićwinko; POL | 1.90 m	Airinė Palšytė; LTU | 1.87 m	Irina Gordeyeva; RUS | 1.87 m
Women's Triple Jump	Caterine Ibarguen; COL | 14.49 m	Kimberly Williams; JAM | 14.34 m	Olha Saladukha; UKR | 14.31 m	Hanna Minenko; ISR | 14.21 m	Anna Pyatykh; RUS | DQ	Anna Jagaciak; POL | 13.85 m	Irina Gumenyuk; RUS | 13.61 m	Yekaterina Kayukova-Chernenko; RUS | 13.26 m
Women's Discus Throw	Sandra Perković; CRO | 67.04 m	Gia Lewis-Smallwood; USA | 64.82 m	Melina Robert-Michon; FRA | 63.45 m	Yarelis Barrios; CUB | 63.02 m	Zinaida Sendriutė; LTU | 62.05 m	Żaneta Glanc; POL | 60.81 m	Nadine Müller; GER | 60.40 m	Anna Rüh; GER | 58.59 m
