= 2013 Meeting Areva =

- Dates: 6 July 2013
- Host city: Saint-Denis, France
- Venue: Stade de France
- Level: 2013 Diamond League

The 2013 Meeting Areva was the 29th edition of the annual outdoor track and field meeting in Saint-Denis, France. Held on 6 July at Stade de France, it was the ninth leg of the 2013 Diamond League – the highest level international track and field circuit.

== Diamond events results ==
Podium finishers earned points towards a season leaderboard (4-2-1 respectively), points per event were then doubled in the Diamond League Finals. Athletes had to take part in the Diamond race during the finals to be eligible to win the Diamond trophy which is awarded to the athlete with the most points at the end of the season.

=== Men's ===
200 Metres
Rank	Athlete	Nation	Time	Points	Notes
1st place, gold medalist(s)	Usain Bolt	Jamaica	19.73	4	MR, WL
2nd place, silver medalist(s)	Warren Weir	Jamaica	19.92	2	
3rd place, bronze medalist(s)	Christophe Lemaitre	France	20.07	1	SB
4	Jason Young	Jamaica	20.12		SB
5	Nickel Ashmeade	Jamaica	20.21		
6	Jimmy Vicaut	France	20.30		PB
7	Maurice Mitchell	United States	20.61		
8	Méba-Mickaël Zeze	France	21.29		
			Wind: (+0.2 m/s)		

400 Metres
Rank	Athlete	Nation	Time	Points	Notes
1st place, gold medalist(s)	Kirani James	Grenada	43.96	4	Wl
2nd place, silver medalist(s)	LaShawn Merritt	United States	44.09	2	SB
3rd place, bronze medalist(s)	Tony McQuay	United States	44.84	1	
4	David Verburg	United States	44.97		
5	Pavel Maslák	Czech Republic	45.13		SB
6	Chris Brown	Bahamas	45.24		SB
7	Calvin Smith Jr.	United States	45.33		SB
8	Mame-Ibra Anne	France	45.73		PB

1500 Metres
Rank	Athlete	Nation	Time	Points	Notes
1st place, gold medalist(s)	Ayanleh Souleiman	Djibouti	3:32.55	4	SB
2nd place, silver medalist(s)	Aman Wote	Ethiopia	3:32.65	2	PB
3rd place, bronze medalist(s)	Leonel Manzano	United States	3:33.14	1	SB
4	Mohamed Moustaoui	Morocco	3:33.18		SB
5	Lawi Lalang	Kenya	3:33.20		PB
6	Benson Seurei	Bahrain	3:33.33		
7	Florian Carvalho	France	3:33.47		PB
8	Bouabdellah Tahri	France	3:33.89		PB
9	Simon Denissel	France	3:34.54		PB
10	Lopez Lomong	United States	3:34.55		SB
11	Abdalaati Iguider	Morocco	3:35.37		
12	Arturo Casado	Spain	3:36.33		SB
13	Bernard Lagat	United States	3:36.36		
14	Mekonnen Gebremedhin	Ethiopia	3:37.36		
—	Geofrey Barusei	Kenya	DNF		
—	Matthew Centrowitz Jr.	United States	DNF		
—	Geoffrey Rono	Kenya	DNF		

110 Metres hurdles
Rank	Athlete	Nation	Time	Points	Notes
1st place, gold medalist(s)	Aries Merritt	United States	13.09	4	SB
2nd place, silver medalist(s)	Pascal Martinot-Lagarde	France	13.12	2	PB
3rd place, bronze medalist(s)	David Oliver	United States	13.13	1	
4	Andrew Riley	Jamaica	13.14		SB
5	Ryan Brathwaite	Barbados	13.14		=NR
6	Ryan Wilson	United States	13.15		
7	Jason Richardson	United States	13.22		
8	Thomas Martinot-Lagarde	France	13.26		PB
9	Dayron Robles	Cuba	13.40		SB
			Wind: (±0.0 m/s)		

3000 Metres steeplechase
Rank	Athlete	Nation	Time	Points	Notes
1st place, gold medalist(s)	Ezekiel Kemboi	Kenya	7:59.03	4	MR, WL
2nd place, silver medalist(s)	Mahiedine Mekhissi-Benabbad	France	8:00.09	2	AR
3rd place, bronze medalist(s)	Paul Kipsiele Koech	Kenya	8:09.17	1	
4	Roba Gari	Ethiopia	8:12.22		SB
5	Benjamin Kiplagat	Uganda	8:13.07		SB
6	Noureddine Smaïl	France	8:15.89		PB
7	Hamid Ezzine	Morocco	8:17.67		
8	Yoann Kowal	France	8:20.41		
9	Bernard Nganga	Kenya	8:22.68		
10	Sebastián Martos	Spain	8:23.10		
11	Ángel Mullera	Spain	8:23.39		SB
12	Timothy Toroitich	Uganda	8:25.32		SB
13	Abdelhamid Zerrifi	Algeria	8:25.96		PB
14	Tomasz Szymkowiak	Poland	8:27.40		
15	Łukasz Parszczyński	Poland	8:32.76		
—	Jacob Araptany	Uganda	DNF		
—	Haron Lagat	Kenya	DNF		

Pole vault
Rank	Athlete	Nation	Height	Points	Notes
1st place, gold medalist(s)	Renaud Lavillenie	France	5.92 m	4	
2nd place, silver medalist(s)	Jan Kudlička	Czech Republic	5.70 m	2	
3rd place, bronze medalist(s)	Konstantinos Filippidis	Greece	5.70 m	1	
4	Raphael Holzdeppe	Germany	5.60 m		
5	Brad Walker	United States	5.60 m		
6	Steven Lewis	Great Britain	5.60 m		=SB
7	Augusto Dutra de Oliveira	Brazil	5.60 m		
8	Valentin Lavillenie	France	5.45 m		
9	Jeremy Scott	United States	5.45 m		
10	Kévin Menaldo	France	5.30 m		
11	Romain Mesnil	France	5.30 m		SB

Long jump
Rank	Athlete	Nation	Distance	Points	Notes
1st place, gold medalist(s)	Damar Forbes	Jamaica	8.11 m (−0.2 m/s)	4	
2nd place, silver medalist(s)	Chris Tomlinson	Great Britain	8.08 m (+0.2 m/s)	2	
3rd place, bronze medalist(s)	Louis Tsatoumas	Greece	8.02 m (−0.1 m/s)	1	
4	Greg Rutherford	Great Britain	7.99 m (−0.5 m/s)		
5	Ignisious Gaisah	Netherlands	7.96 m (+0.4 m/s)		
6	Godfrey Khotso Mokoena	South Africa	7.87 m (−0.1 m/s)		
7	Kafétien Gomis	France	7.86 m (−0.3 m/s)		
8	Michel Tornéus	Sweden	7.82 m (+0.4 m/s)		
9	Nicolas Gomont	France	7.71 m (±0.0 m/s)		
10	Dwight Phillips	United States	7.66 m (−0.2 m/s)		
11	Ngonidzashe Makusha	Zimbabwe	7.35 m (+0.9 m/s)		
—	Salim Sdiri	France	NM		

Discus throw
Rank	Athlete	Nation	Distance	Points	Notes
1st place, gold medalist(s)	Robert Harting	Germany	67.04 m	4	
2nd place, silver medalist(s)	Ehsan Haddadi	Iran	65.53 m	2	
3rd place, bronze medalist(s)	Gerd Kanter	Estonia	65.30 m	1	
4	Vikas Gowda	India	64.45 m		
5	Frank Casañas	Spain	63.89 m		
6	Robert Urbanek	Poland	63.33 m		
7	Erik Cadée	Netherlands	62.97 m		
8	Benn Harradine	Australia	62.62 m		
9	Lolassonn Djouhan	France	58.89 m		

=== Women's ===
100 Metres
Rank	Athlete	Nation	Time	Points	Notes
1st place, gold medalist(s)	Shelly-Ann Fraser-Pryce	Jamaica	10.92	4	SB
2nd place, silver medalist(s)	Blessing Okagbare	Nigeria	10.93	2	SB
3rd place, bronze medalist(s)	Murielle Ahouré-Demps	Ivory Coast	11.01	1	SB
~~4~~	~~Kelly-Ann Baptiste~~	~~Trinidad and Tobago~~	~~11.10~~		DQ (Note: Due to doping violations Baptiste's results during this competition were disqualified.)
5	English Gardner	United States	11.13		
6	Ivet Lalova-Collio	Bulgaria	11.20		
7	Shalonda Solomon	United States	11.21		SB
8	Mariya Ryemyen	Ukraine	11.29		
9	Myriam Soumaré	France	11.32		SB
			Wind: (−0.2 m/s)		

800 Metres
Rank	Athlete	Nation	Time	Points	Notes
1st place, gold medalist(s)	Francine Niyonsaba	Burundi	1:57.26	4	
2nd place, silver medalist(s)	Malika Akkaoui	Morocco	1:57.64	2	PB
3rd place, bronze medalist(s)	Alysia Montaño	United States	1:57.75	1	SB
4	Kate Grace	United States	1:59.47		PB
5	Marilyn Okoro	Great Britain	1:59.76		SB
6	Siham Hilali	Morocco	2:00.15		PB
7	Maryna Arzamasova	Belarus	2:00.70		
8	Ajeé Wilson	United States	2:00.90		
9	Justine Fedronic	France	2:00.97		PB
10	Fantu Magiso	Ethiopia	2:11.82		
—	Sviatlana Usovich	Belarus	DNF		

5000 Metres
Rank	Athlete	Nation	Time	Points	Notes
1st place, gold medalist(s)	Tirunesh Dibaba	Ethiopia	14:23.68	4	MR, WL
2nd place, silver medalist(s)	Almaz Ayana	Ethiopia	14:25.84	2	PB
3rd place, bronze medalist(s)	Gelete Burka	Ethiopia	14:42.07	1	SB
4	Sule Utura	Ethiopia	14:59.74		SB
5	Buze Diriba	Ethiopia	15:01.44		
6	Molly Huddle	United States	15:10.56		
7	Alemitu Heroye	Ethiopia	15:11.78		
8	Genet Yalew	Ethiopia	15:12.05		
9	Jackie Areson	Australia	15:12.09		PB
10	Sophie Duarte	France	15:14.57		PB
11	Stephanie Twell	Great Britain	15:18.60		SB
12	Afera Godfay	Ethiopia	15:20.38		SB
13	Amy Cragg	United States	15:28.79		
14	Roman Gidey	Ethiopia	15:45.60		SB
—	Gabriele Grunewald	United States	DNF		

400 Metres hurdles
Rank	Athlete	Nation	Time	Points	Notes
1st place, gold medalist(s)	Zuzana Hejnová	Czech Republic	53.23	4	NR
2nd place, silver medalist(s)	Perri Shakes-Drayton	Great Britain	53.96	2	
3rd place, bronze medalist(s)	Georganne Moline	United States	54.19	1	
4	Denisa Helceletová	Czech Republic	54.38		SB
5	Kaliese Spencer	Jamaica	55.22		
6	Ristananna Bailey-Cole	Jamaica	55.33		
7	Phara Anacharsis	France	56.55		SB

High jump
Rank	Athlete	Nation	Height	Points	Notes
1st place, gold medalist(s)	Anna Chicherova	Russia	2.01 m	4	
2nd place, silver medalist(s)	Beloved Promise	United States	1.98 m	2	
3rd place, bronze medalist(s)	Blanka Vlašić	Croatia	1.98 m	1	
4	Emma Green	Sweden	1.92 m		
5	Ana Šimić	Croatia	1.92 m		
6	Inika McPherson	United States	1.92 m		=SB
7	Nadiya Dusanova	Uzbekistan	1.89 m		
8	Ebba Jungmark	Sweden	1.85 m		
9	Olena Holosha	Ukraine	1.80 m		

Triple jump
Rank	Athlete	Nation	Distance	Points	Notes
1st place, gold medalist(s)	Caterine Ibargüen	Colombia	14.69 m (−1.3 m/s)	4	
2nd place, silver medalist(s)	Hanna Knyazyeva-Minenko	Israel	14.58 m (−0.6 m/s)	2	SB
3rd place, bronze medalist(s)	Olha Saladukha	Ukraine	14.55 m (+0.6 m/s)	1	
4	Kimberly Williams	Jamaica	14.48 m (±0.0 m/s)		SB
5	Irina Gumenyuk	Russia	14.07 m (+0.7 m/s)		
6	Dana Velďáková	Slovakia	13.91 m (−0.6 m/s)		
7	Yekaterina Kayukova-Chernenko	Russia	13.89 m (±0.0 m/s)		
8	Teresa Nzola Meso Ba	France	13.82 m (−0.2 m/s)		
9	Snežana Rodić	Slovenia	13.81 m (−0.4 m/s)		
10	Trecia-Kaye Smith	Jamaica	13.68 m (−0.2 m/s)		
11	Nathalie Marie-Nely	France	13.18 m (+0.4 m/s)		
—	Ruslana Tsykhotska	Ukraine	NM		

Shot put
Rank	Athlete	Nation	Distance	Points	Notes
1st place, gold medalist(s)	Valerie Adams	New Zealand	20.62 m	4	
2nd place, silver medalist(s)	Michelle Carter	United States	19.57 m	2	
3rd place, bronze medalist(s)	Nadine Kleinert	Germany	17.95 m	1	
4	Melissa Boekelman	Netherlands	17.65 m		SB
5	Yuliya Leantsiuk	Belarus	17.55 m		
6	Úrsula Ruiz	Spain	17.17 m		
7	Jessica Cérival	France	17.04 m		SB

Javelin throw
Rank	Athlete	Nation	Distance	Points	Notes
1st place, gold medalist(s)	Christina Obergföll	Germany	64.74 m	4	
2nd place, silver medalist(s)	Kim Mickle	Australia	64.35 m	2	
3rd place, bronze medalist(s)	Madara Sady Ndure	Latvia	61.36 m	1	
4	Kathryn Mitchell	Australia	60.86 m		
~~5~~	~~Martina Ratej~~	~~Slovenia~~	~~59.20 m~~		DQ (Note: Due to doping violations Ratej's results during this competition were disqualified.)
6	Mercedes Chilla	Spain	55.99 m		
7	Sinta Ozoliņa-Kovala	Latvia	55.97 m		
8	Mathilde Andraud	France	53.20 m		

== See also ==
- 2013 Diamond League
