= 2013 Bislett Games =

- Dates: 13 June 2013
- Host city: Oslo, Norway
- Venue: Bislett Stadium
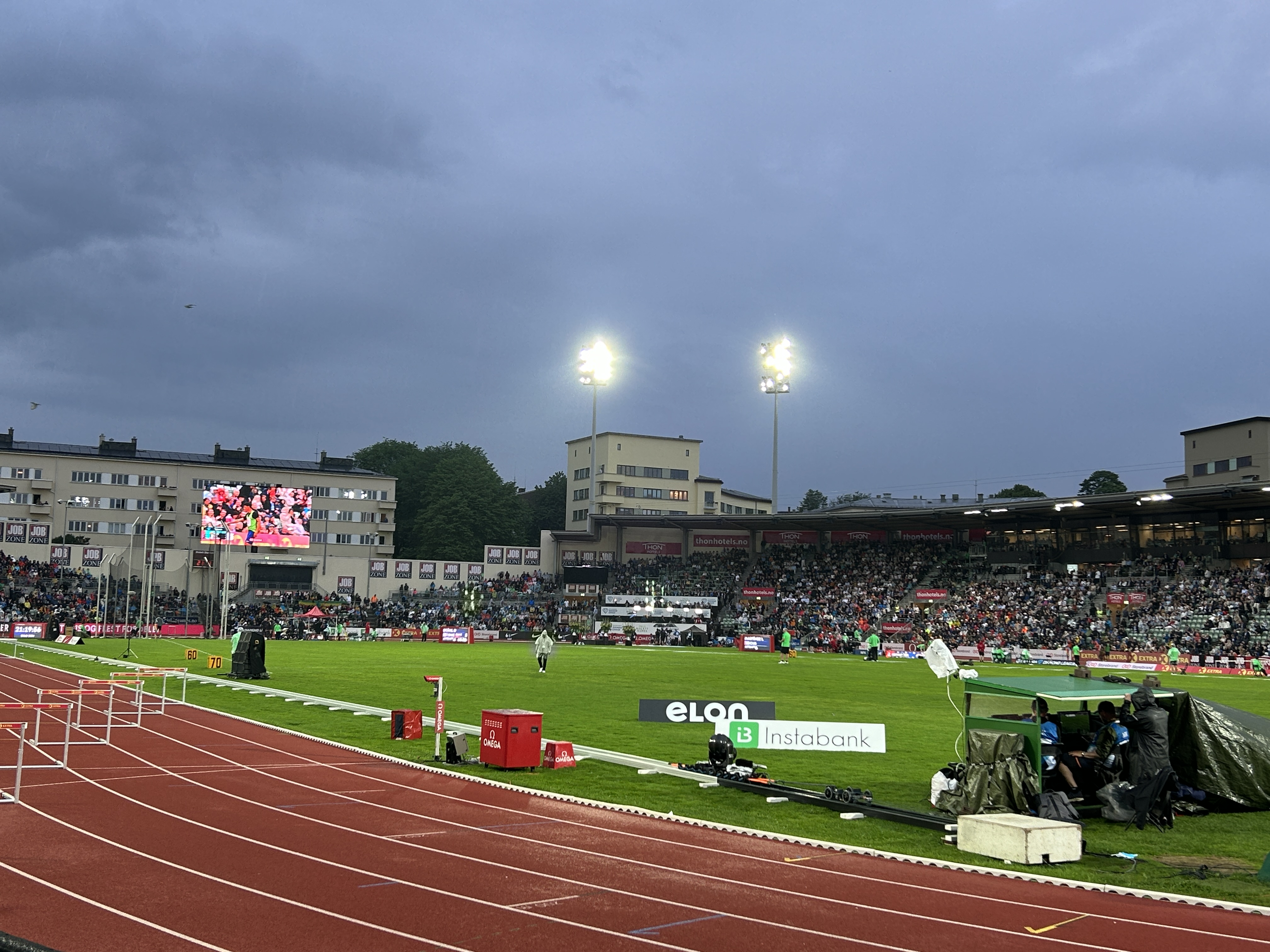
- Level: 2013 Diamond League

The 2013 Bislett Games was the 49th edition of the annual outdoor track and field meeting in Oslo, Norway. Held on 13 June at Bislett Stadium, it was the sixth leg of the 2013 Diamond League – the highest level international track and field circuit.

== Diamond discipline results ==
Podium finishers earned points towards a season leaderboard (4-2-1 respectively), points per event were then doubled in the Diamond League Finals. Athletes had to take part in the Diamond race during the finals to be eligible to win the Diamond trophy which is awarded to the athlete with the most points at the end of the season.

=== Men's ===
200 metres
Rank	Athlete	Nation	Time	Points	Notes
1st place, gold medalist(s)	Usain Bolt	Jamaica	19.79	4	MR, WL
2nd place, silver medalist(s)	Jaysuma Saidy Ndure	Norway	20.36	2	SB
3rd place, bronze medalist(s)	James Ellington	Great Britain	20.55	1	
4	Jonathan Borlée	Belgium	20.56		SB
5	David Bolarinwa	Great Britain	20.62		
6	Danny Talbot	Great Britain	20.72		
7	Nil de Oliveira	Sweden	20.88		
—	Churandy Martina	Netherlands	DQ		R 162.7
			Wind: (+1.7 m/s)		

400 metres
Rank	Athlete	Nation	Time	Points	Notes
1st place, gold medalist(s)	Yousef Masrahi	Saudi Arabia	45.33	4	
2nd place, silver medalist(s)	Ramon Miller	Bahamas	45.58	2	SB
3rd place, bronze medalist(s)	Nigel Levine	Great Britain	45.63	1	
4	Luguelín Santos	Dominican Republic	45.69		
5	Kevin Borlée	Belgium	45.86		
6	Martyn Rooney	Great Britain	46.11		
7	Nick Ekelund-Arenander	Denmark	46.80		
8	Yannick Fonsat	France	62.69		

Mile
Rank	Athlete	Nation	Time	Points	Notes
1st place, gold medalist(s)	Ayanleh Souleiman	Djibouti	3:50.53	4	
2nd place, silver medalist(s)	Nixon Chepseba	Kenya	3:50.95	2	PB
3rd place, bronze medalist(s)	James Kiplagat Magut	Kenya	3:51.11	1	SB
4	İlham Tanui Özbilen	Turkey	3:52.30		
5	Collins Cheboi	Kenya	3:52.70		
6	David Bustos	Spain	3:53.40		
7	Bethwell Birgen	Kenya	3:53.46		
8	Andreas Vojta	Austria	3:53.95		
9	Johan Cronje	South Africa	3:54.86		
10	Dawit Wolde	Ethiopia	3:55.00		
11	Henrik Ingebrigtsen	Norway	3:58.27		
12	Ryan Gregson	Australia	3:58.83		
13	David Bishop	Great Britain	4:00.43		
—	Andrew Kiptoo Rotich	Kenya	DNF		
—	Mekonnen Gebremedhin	Ethiopia	DNF		
—	Geoffrey Rono	Kenya	DNF		

3000 metres steeplechase
Rank	Athlete	Nation	Time	Points	Notes
1st place, gold medalist(s)	Conseslus Kipruto	Kenya	8:04.48	4	
2nd place, silver medalist(s)	Ezekiel Kemboi	Kenya	8:07.00	2	SB
3rd place, bronze medalist(s)	Hillary Yego	Kenya	8:09.01	1	
4	Jairus Birech	Kenya	8:11.29		
5	Gilbert Kirui	Kenya	8:12.36		
6	Abel Mutai	Kenya	8:19.93		
7	Roba Gari	Ethiopia	8:24.66		
8	Hamid Ezzine	Morocco	8:24.73		
9	Łukasz Parszczyński	Poland	8:25.01		SB
10	Tarık Langat Akdağ	Turkey	8:31.46		
11	Richard Mateelong	Kenya	8:40.47		SB
—	Haron Lagat	Kenya	DNF		
—	James Kosgei Cheptuiyon	Kenya	DNF		

Discus throw
Rank	Athlete	Nation	Distance	Points	Notes
1st place, gold medalist(s)	Gerd Kanter	Estonia	65.52 m	4	SB
2nd place, silver medalist(s)	Ehsan Haddadi	Iran	64.63 m	2	
3rd place, bronze medalist(s)	Robert Urbanek	Poland	64.58 m	1	
4	Martin Wierig	Germany	63.92 m		
5	Erik Cadée	Netherlands	63.73 m		
6	Frank Casañas	Spain	62.64 m		
7	Fredrik Amundgård	Norway	57.18 m		
8	Magnus Røsholm Berntsen	Norway	54.94 m		
9	Daniel Ståhl	Sweden	54.36 m		
—	Piotr Małachowski	Poland	NM		

Javelin throw
Rank	Athlete	Nation	Distance	Points	Notes
1st place, gold medalist(s)	Vítězslav Veselý	Czech Republic	85.96 m	4	
2nd place, silver medalist(s)	Tero Pitkämäki	Finland	84.74 m	2	
3rd place, bronze medalist(s)	Thomas Röhler	Germany	82.83 m	1	
4	Kim Amb	Sweden	82.60 m		
5	Roman Avramenko	Ukraine	82.04 m		
6	Andreas Thorkildsen	Norway	80.99 m		
7	Ari Mannio	Finland	80.70 m		
8	Ivan Zaytsev	Uzbekistan	78.28 m		
9	Zigismunds Sirmais	Latvia	78.18 m		
10	Keshorn Walcott	Trinidad and Tobago	77.03 m		

=== Women's ===
100 metres
Rank	Athlete	Nation	Time	Points	Notes
1st place, gold medalist(s)	Ivet Lalova-Collio	Bulgaria	11.04	4	SB
2nd place, silver medalist(s)	Murielle Ahouré-Demps	Ivory Coast	11.05	2	SB
3rd place, bronze medalist(s)	Mariya Ryemyen	Ukraine	11.07	1	
4	Olesya Povh	Ukraine	11.15		
5	Verena Sailer	Germany	11.24		SB
6	Ezinne Okparaebo	Norway	11.30		SB
7	Sheri-Ann Brooks	Jamaica	11.34		
8	Myriam Soumaré	France	11.38		SB
			Wind: (+1.2 m/s)		

800 metres
Rank	Athlete	Nation	Time	Points	Notes
1st place, gold medalist(s)	Ekaterina Guliyev	Russia	1:59.39	4	SB
2nd place, silver medalist(s)	Nataliia Lupu	Ukraine	1:59.59	2	SB
3rd place, bronze medalist(s)	Janeth Jepkosgei	Kenya	2:00.09	1	
4	Fantu Magiso	Ethiopia	2:00.25		
5	Nelly Jepkosgei	Kenya	2:00.52		
6	Winny Chebet	Kenya	2:01.21		
7	Laura Crowe	Ireland	2:02.69		PB
8	Clarisse Moh	France	2:03.54		SB
9	Lenka Masná	Czech Republic	2:04.33		
—	Eglė Balčiūnaitė	Lithuania	DNF		

5000 metres
Rank	Athlete	Nation	Time	Points	Notes
1st place, gold medalist(s)	Meseret Defar	Ethiopia	14:26.90	4	WL
2nd place, silver medalist(s)	Viola Kibiwot	Kenya	14:33.48	2	PB
3rd place, bronze medalist(s)	Genzebe Dibaba	Ethiopia	14:37.68	1	SB
4	Margaret Muriuki	Kenya	14:40.48		PB
5	Mercy Cherono	Kenya	14:42.43		SB
6	Buze Diriba	Ethiopia	14:50.02		PB
7	Agnes Tirop	Kenya	14:50.36		PB
8	Irene Chepet Cheptai	Kenya	14:57.56		
9	Sylvia Jebiwot Kibet	Kenya	15:02.01		SB
10	Shitaye Eshete	Brunei	15:03.49		
11	Susan Krumins	Netherlands	15:04.36		PB
12	Genet Yalew	Ethiopia	15:04.38		SB
13	Gotytom Gebreslase	Ethiopia	15:24.11		
14	Karoline Bjerkeli Grøvdal	Norway	15:27.31		
—	Janet Kisa	Kenya	DNF		
—	Janet Achola	Uganda	DNF		

100 metres hurdles
Rank	Athlete	Nation	Time	Points	Notes
1st place, gold medalist(s)	Tiffany Porter	Great Britain	12.76	4	
2nd place, silver medalist(s)	Sara Aerts	Belgium	12.95	2	SB
3rd place, bronze medalist(s)	Beate Schrott	Austria	12.97	1	SB
4	Veronica Borsi	Italy	12.99		
5	Alina Talay	Belarus	13.03		=SB
6	Isabelle Pedersen	Norway	13.16		PB
7	Cindy Billaud	France	13.19		
8	Reïna-Flor Okori	France	13.31		
			Wind: (+1.4 m/s)		

400 metres hurdles
Rank	Athlete	Nation	Time	Points	Notes
1st place, gold medalist(s)	Zuzana Hejnová	Czech Republic	53.60	4	SB
2nd place, silver medalist(s)	Perri Shakes-Drayton	Great Britain	54.03	2	SB
3rd place, bronze medalist(s)	Dalilah Muhammad	United States	54.33	1	PB
4	Angela Moroșanu	Romania	54.52		
5	Lashinda Demus	United States	54.69		SB
6	Anna Ryzhykova	Ukraine	55.41		
7	Yadisleidy Pedroso	Italy	55.68		
8	Stine Meland Tomb	Norway	58.49		

High jump
Rank	Athlete	Nation	Height	Points	Notes
1st place, gold medalist(s)	~~Svetlana Shkolina~~	~~Russia~~	~~1.97 m~~	4	DQ (Note: Due to doping violations Shkolina's results from 16 July 2012 to 31 December 2014 were disqualified.)
2nd place, silver medalist(s)	Emma Green	Sweden	1.95 m	2	SB
3rd place, bronze medalist(s)	Anna Chicherova	Russia	1.95 m	1	
4	Tonje Angelsen	Norway	1.90 m		SB
5	Blanka Vlašić	Croatia	1.85 m		
5	Ruth Beitia	Spain	1.85 m		
7	Anna Iljuštšenko	Estonia	1.85 m		
8	Irina Gordeeva	Russia	1.85 m		
9	Melanie Skotnik	France	1.80 m		

Pole vault
Rank	Athlete	Nation	Height	Points	Notes
1st place, gold medalist(s)	Silke Spiegelburg	Germany	4.65 m	4	SB
2nd place, silver medalist(s)	Nikoleta Kyriakopoulou	Greece	4.60 m	2	SB
3rd place, bronze medalist(s)	Anna Rogowska	Poland	4.50 m	1	=SB
4	Angelica Bengtsson	Sweden	4.50 m		SB
5	Lisa Ryzih	Germany	4.40 m		=SB
6	Jiřina Kudličková	Czech Republic	4.30 m		
7	Martina Strutz	Germany	4.30 m		
8	Cathrine Larsåsen	Norway	4.20 m		
—	Fabiana Murer	Brazil	NM		

Long jump
Rank	Athlete	Nation	Distance	Points	Notes
1st place, gold medalist(s)	Shara Proctor	Great Britain	6.89 m (+1.5 m/s)	4	
2nd place, silver medalist(s)	Éloyse Lesueur-Aymonin	France	6.68 m (+1.0 m/s)	2	
3rd place, bronze medalist(s)	Yelena Sokolova	Russia	6.65 m (±0.0 m/s)	1	
4	Erica Jarder	Sweden	6.59 m (+1.8 m/s)		
5	Veronika Mosina	Russia	6.54 m (±0.0 m/s)		
6	Ivana Španović	Serbia	6.50 m (+1.4 m/s)		
7	Lauma Grīva	Latvia	6.48 m (+3.5 m/s)		
8	Nadia Akpana Assa	Norway	5.87 m (+1.4 m/s)		
Best wind-legal performances
	Lauma Grīva	Latvia	6.40 m (+0.6 m/s)		

Triple jump
Rank	Athlete	Nation	Distance	Points	Notes
1st place, gold medalist(s)	Caterine Ibargüen	Colombia	14.81 m (±0.0 m/s)	4	
2nd place, silver medalist(s)	Olha Saladukha	Ukraine	14.56 m (+0.6 m/s)	2	
3rd place, bronze medalist(s)	Anna Pyatykh	Russia	14.16 m (±0.0 m/s)	1	=SB
4	Snežana Rodić	Slovenia	14.10 m (±0.0 m/s)		=SB
5	Kimberly Williams	Jamaica	13.98 m (±0.0 m/s)		
6	Dana Velďáková	Slovakia	13.92 m (+0.1 m/s)		
7	Yekaterina Kayukova-Chernenko	Russia	13.84 m (±0.0 m/s)		
8	Yamilé Aldama	United Kingdom	13.82 m (+0.7 m/s)		
9	Hanna Knyazyeva-Minenko	Israel	13.66 m (±0.0 m/s)		
10	Chiamaka Okparaebo	Norway	12.70 m (+3.1 m/s)		

Shot put
Rank	Athlete	Nation	Distance	Points	Notes
1st place, gold medalist(s)	Christina Schwanitz	Germany	20.10 m	4	
2nd place, silver medalist(s)	Nadine Kleinert	Germany	18.17 m	2	
3rd place, bronze medalist(s)	Natalia Duco	Chile	18.00 m	1	=SB
4	Josephine Terlecki	Germany	17.63 m		
5	Kristin Sundsteigen	Norway	14.48 m		

== National events results ==
=== Men's ===
200 metres
Rank	Athlete	Nation	Time	Notes
1st place, gold medalist(s)	Johan Wissman	Sweden	20.94	
2nd place, silver medalist(s)	Carl Emil Kåshagen	Norway	21.70	
3rd place, bronze medalist(s)	Jonas Tapani Halonen	Norway	21.87	PB
4	Henrik Overvåg	Norway	21.94	SB
5	Simen Sigurdsen	Norway	22.23	
6	Even Meinseth	Norway	22.25	=PB
7	Karsten Warholm	Norway	22.25	
8	Ousman Touray	Norway	22.36	
			Wind: (+0.2 m/s)	

400 metres
Rank	Athlete	Nation	Time	Notes
1st place, gold medalist(s)	Andreas Roth	Norway	47.54	PB
2nd place, silver medalist(s)	Sondre Nyvold Lid	Norway	48.24	
3rd place, bronze medalist(s)	Mauritz Kåshagen	Norway	48.52	
4	Torbjørn Lysne	Norway	49.05	
5	Torbjörn Fossum Heldal	Norway	49.19	PB
6	Jørgen Kåshagen	Norway	49.57	

800 metres
Rank	Heat	Athlete	Nation	Time	Notes
1st place, gold medalist(s)	1	Johan Rogestedt	Sweden	1:47.34	SB
2nd place, silver medalist(s)	1	Joe Thomas	Great Britain	1:47.73	
3rd place, bronze medalist(s)	1	Johan Svensson	Sweden	1:49.45	SB
4	1	Rickard Gunnarsson	Sweden	1:49.88	
5	1	Emil Oustad	Norway	1:50.03	PB
6	1	Elias Ottosen	Norway	1:50.37	PB
7	1	Håkon Mushom	Norway	1:51.56	
8	1	Snorre Holtan Løken	Norway	1:51.72	PB
9	2	Sondre Dingsør Skogen	Norway	1:52.79	PB
10	2	Kristian Uldbjerg Hansen	Denmark	1:53.50	
11	2	Sigurd Blom Breivik	Norway	1:53.65	PB
12	2	Edvard Kamperud Nygaard	Norway	1:53.84	PB
13	1	Nick Jensen	Denmark	1:54.64	
14	2	Abduljaleel Mohamoud Ismail Hir	Norway	1:55.50	
15	2	Simon Paul Sandbakken	Norway	1:55.98	PB
16	2	Markus Einan	Norway	1:57.19	
17	2	Mathias Berntzen Engevik	Norway	1:57.44	
—	1	Vegard Løberg Gjelsvik	Norway	DNF	
—	2	Martin Smebye	Norway	DNF	
—	2	Haavard Olav Herness Lien	Norway	DNF	

1500 metres
Rank	Athlete	Nation	Time	Notes
1st place, gold medalist(s)	Filip Ingebrigtsen	Norway	3:42.37	PB
2nd place, silver medalist(s)	James Brewer	Great Britain	3:43.61	
3rd place, bronze medalist(s)	Johan Hydén	Sweden	3:43.69	PB
4	Hans Kristian Fløystad	Norway	3:44.64	SB
5	Vegard Vegard	Norway	3:46.13	PB
6	Sindre Løchting	Norway	3:46.33	PB
7	Erik Udø Pedersen	Norway	3:47.03	PB
8	Chris Warburton	Great Britain	3:47.15	
9	Eivind Jenssen	Norway	3:48.51	
10	Vidar Dahle	Norway	3:49.35	
11	Kris Gauson	Great Britain	3:49.38	
12	Håkon Brox	Norway	3:49.73	
13	Magnus Hannevig Pettersen	Norway	3:50.02	
14	Eirik Bråten Richenberg	Norway	3:50.64	PB
15	Audun Nordtveit	Norway	3:50.77	PB
16	Anders Sørensen	Norway	4:07.95	
—	Morten Velde	Norway	DNF	
—	Håvard Hildeskor	Norway	DNF	

110 metres hurdles
Rank	Athlete	Nation	Time	Notes
1st place, gold medalist(s)	Philip Nossmy	Sweden	13.54	
2nd place, silver medalist(s)	Adrien Deghelt	Belgium	13.54	
3rd place, bronze medalist(s)	Gregory Sedoc	Netherlands	13.65	
4	Andreas Martinsen	Denmark	13.77	
5	Vladimir Vukicevic	Norway	14.21	
6	Filip Lööv	Sweden	14.36	
—	Damien Broothaerts	Belgium	DQ	R 162.7
			Wind: (+2.3 m/s)	

400 metres hurdles
Rank	Athlete	Nation	Time	Notes
1st place, gold medalist(s)	Leonardo Capotosti	Italy	50.33	PB
2nd place, silver medalist(s)	Øyvind Strømmen Kjerpeset	Norway	50.81	PB
3rd place, bronze medalist(s)	Erik Lindahl	Sweden	52.14	PB
4	Marius Bakken Støle	Norway	52.23	SB
5	Anders Erlend Idås	Norway	53.35	
6	Markus Loftås	Norway	53.52	
7	Joachim Sandberg	Norway	53.66	PB
8	Kristian Berg	Norway	53.67	PB

=== Women's ===
200 metres
Rank	Athlete	Nation	Time	Notes
1st place, gold medalist(s)	Moa Hjelmer	Sweden	23.19	PB
2nd place, silver medalist(s)	Elisabeth Slettum	Norway	23.59	SB
3rd place, bronze medalist(s)	Folake Akinyemi	Norway	24.07	
4	Christine Bjelland Jensen	Norway	24.25	PB
5	Astrid Mangen Ingebrigtsen	Norway	24.36	PB
6	Siv Sneen	Norway	24.83	SB
7	Heidi Hessan Næss	Norway	24.91	=SB
8	Julie Bertheussen Falkanger	Norway	25.04	PB
			Wind: (+1.1 m/s)	

400 metres
Rank	Athlete	Nation	Time	Notes
1st place, gold medalist(s)	Anyika Onuora	Great Britain	52.11	
2nd place, silver medalist(s)	Madiea Ghafoor	Netherlands	52.61	
3rd place, bronze medalist(s)	Line Kloster	Norway	52.78	PB
4	Tara Marie Norum	Norway	53.93	PB
5	Trine Mjåland	Norway	54.15	PB
6	Vilde Svortevik	Norway	54.35	PB
6	Yngvild Elvemo	Norway	56.17	SB
6	Sara Dorthea Jensen	Norway	58.11	PB

1500 metres
Rank	Athlete	Nation	Time	Notes
1st place, gold medalist(s)	Meraf Bahta	Eritrea	4:11.69	PB
2nd place, silver medalist(s)	Axumawit Embaye	Ethiopia	4:11.73	PB
3rd place, bronze medalist(s)	Linn Nilsson	Sweden	4:19.11	PB
4	Ingeborg Løvnes	Norway	4:19.41	
5	Kajsa Barr	Sweden	4:20.35	PB
6	Claire Gibson	Great Britain	4:20.80	
7	Frida Berge	Norway	4:22.41	SB
8	Annie Bersagel	United States	4:23.44	PB
9	Aurora Dybedokken	Norway	4:24.21	PB
10	Elisabeth Angell Bergh	Norway	4:29.33	PB
11	Christina Maria Toogood	Norway	4:31.37	
12	Heidi Mårtensson	Norway	4:31.60	PB
13	Maria Larsen	Denmark	4:33.04	
14	Hedda Hynne	Norway	4:33.41	
15	Irene Johansen	Norway	4:33.42	PB
16	Mari Aarskog Nesse	Norway	4:35.08	PB
17	Karoline Egeland Skatteboe	Norway	4:35.60	SB
18	Hilde Aasheim	Norway	4:36.86	SB
19	Linn Söderholm	Sweden	4:37.87	
20	Kristine Helle	Norway	4:42.51	
21	Kristiane Width	Norway	4:48.82	
—	Trine Mjåland	Norway	DNF	

100 metres hurdles
Rank	Athlete	Nation	Time	Notes
1st place, gold medalist(s)	Tale Ørving	Norway	13.41	PB
2nd place, silver medalist(s)	Lene Secher Myrmel	Norway	13.67	PB
3rd place, bronze medalist(s)	Kine Aaltvedt	Norway	13.71	PB
4	Emma Tuvesson	Sweden	13.88	SB
5	Caroline Lundahl	Sweden	13.91	
6	Eline Breilid	Norway	14.27	SB
7	Ida Bakke Hansen	Norway	14.29	
8	Line Gjerde	Norway	14.39	
			Wind: (+1.1 m/s)	

== See also ==
- 2013 Diamond League
