= Thomas Martinot-Lagarde =

French hurdler

Personal information
- Nationality: France
- Born: 7 February 1988 (age 38)
- Height: 1.86 m (6 ft 1 in)
- Weight: 78 kg (172 lb)

Sport
- Sport: Running
- Event: 110 metres hurdles

Achievements and titles
- Personal best: 110 m h: 13.26 s (Paris 2013)

Thomas Martinot-Lagarde (born 7 February 1988) is a French sprinter who specialises in the 110 metres hurdles. He is the older brother of Pascal Martinot-Lagarde.

In 2013, Martinot-Lagarde reached the final of the men's 110 metres hurdles at the 2013 World Championships in Athletics in Moscow, where he finished seventh.

== Competition record ==
Year	Competition	Venue	Position	Event	Notes
Representing France
2009	European U23 Championships	Kaunas, Lithuania	9th (h)	110 m hurdles	13.82 (wind: 0.9 m/s)
2009	Jeux de la Francophonie	Beirut, Lebanon	7th	110 m hurdles	14.61
2013	Mediterranean Games	Mersin, Turkey	2nd	110 m hurdles	13.48
2013	World Championships	Moscow, Russia	7th	110 m hurdles	13.42
2014	European Championships	Zürich, Switzerland	11th (sf)	110 m hurdles	13.50
