= Athletics at the 2016 Summer Olympics – Men's 110 metres hurdles =

Men's 110 metres hurdles at the Games of the XXXI Olympiad
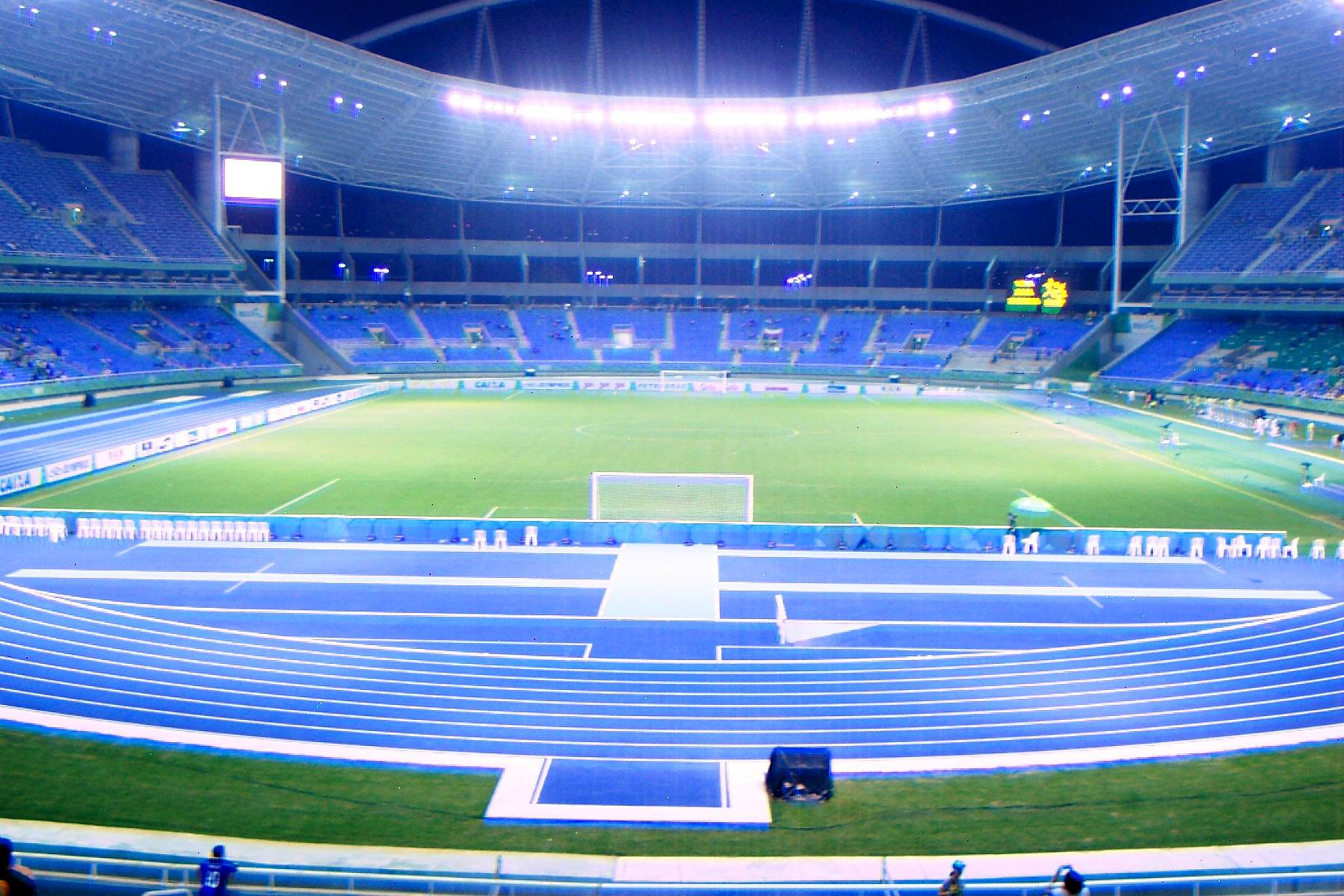
- Interior view of the Estádio Olímpico João Havelange, where the Men's 110m hurdles took place.
- Venue: Olympic Stadium
- Dates: 15 August 2016 (heats); 16 August 2016 (semi-final & final)
- Competitors: 40 from 27 nations
- Winning time: 13.05

Medalists
1st place, gold medalist(s)		Omar McLeod	Jamaica
2nd place, silver medalist(s)		Orlando Ortega	Spain
3rd place, bronze medalist(s)		Dimitri Bascou	France

Official Video

The men's 110 metres hurdles event at the 2016 Summer Olympics took place between 15–16 August at the Olympic Stadium. Forty athletes from 27 nations competed. The event was won by Omar McLeod of Jamaica, the nation's first gold medal and second medal overall (after a bronze four years earlier) in the event. Orlando Ortega's silver was Spain's first medal in the men's high hurdles, while Dimitri Bascou's bronze was France's first medal in the event since 1976.

For the first time, American hurdlers competed, but failed to win a medal: the other occasion there were no American medalists was in 1980, when the United States boycotted the Olympics.

== Background ==
This was the 28th appearance of the event, which is one of 12 athletics events to have been held at every Summer Olympics. The 2012 Olympic champion Aries Merritt did not return after failing at the American Olympic Trials primarily due to a congenital kidney issue diagnosed in 2013 and undergoing kidney transplant in 2015. Olympic medallists David Oliver and Jason Richardson also did not compete. With Sergey Shubenkov absent due to the Russian team's doping ban and an injury to Hansle Parchment, none of the 2012 Olympic or 2015 World Championships podium athletes was present. The top entrant was Omar McLeod, who held the season-leading time of 12.98 seconds and won 60 m hurdles gold at the 2016 World Indoor Championships. Devon Allen, an American college football player, was his nation's trials winner and ranked second globally on 13.03 seconds, just ahead of Cuban-Spaniard Orlando Ortega. France and the United States provided the next fastest entrants in Dimitri Bascou, Pascal Martinot-Lagarde, Ronnie Ash and Jeff Porter.

Laos and Serbia each made their first appearance in the event (however, Serbia's predecessor nations Yugoslavia and Serbia and Montenegro had appeared before). The United States made its 27th appearance, most of any nation (having missed only the boycotted 1980 Games).

== Summary ==
The final started with all eight competitors reaching the first hurdle virtually at the same time. In the center of the track Omar McLeod touching down fractionally ahead of Dimitri Bascou and Pascal Martinot-Lagarde the two Frenchmen who sandwiched him and Milan Trajkovic in lane 8. Going into the second hurdle Bascou gained the fractional edge, but the three in the center of the track ran almost in synchronization for five hurdles, pulling away from the rest of the field. By the sixth hurdle, McLeod had again gained the fractional edge. McLeod continued smoothly but Martinot-Lagarde hit the sixth hurdle and Bascou was awkward going into the seventh hurdle giving McLeod the break away. Over the next two hurdles, McLeod extended his lead as Orlando Ortega and Ronnie Ash began to emerge ahead of the row of hurdlers across the track. Ash hit the ninth hurdle so badly when he arrived at the tenth hurdle he was short, his lead foot hitting the barrier at toe level, knocking the hurdle over and knocking Ash off balance, still in third place but falling. McLeod continued to finish with more than a metre lead over Ortega. Bascou had the lead over his teammate Martinot-Lagarde and American footballer Devon Allen. Ash took several awkward steps and somersaulted over the finish line in last, only to be disqualified for not properly clearing the hurdle.

The following evening the medals were presented by Richard Peterkin, IOC member, Saint Lucia and Bernard Amsalem, Council Member of the IAAF.

== Qualification ==
A National Olympic Committee (NOC) could enter up to 3 qualified athletes in the men's 110 metres hurdles event if all athletes meet the entry standard during the qualifying period. (The limit of 3 has been in place since the 1930 Olympic Congress.) The qualifying standard was 13.47 seconds. The qualifying period was from 1 May 2015 to 11 July 2016. The qualifying time standards could be obtained in various meets during the given period that have the approval of the IAAF. Only outdoor meets were accepted. NOCs could also use their universality place—each NOC could enter one male athlete regardless of time if they had no male athletes meeting the entry standard for an athletics event—in the 110 metres hurdles. The maximum number of athletes per nation had been set at 3 since the 1930 Olympic Congress.

== Competition format ==
The competition was divided into three rounds: a heats stage with five races, three semifinal races, and a final. The top three from each heat qualified for the semifinal, plus the nine fastest non-qualifiers. The top two finishers from each of the semifinals qualified for the final, as did the next two fastest hurdlers.

The first two heats in the first round were run in the rain. It was determined the non-qualifiers from those heats were disadvantaged in time comparison, and those athletes were allowed to run in a repechage round to improve their qualifying time. Two athletes, Deuce Carter and Alexander John, had been disqualified for failure to properly clear hurdles in those earlier races and were allowed to re-enter. Carter qualified for the semifinals from the special race.

== Records ==
Prior to this competition, the existing global and area records were as follows:

World record	Aries Merritt (USA)	12.80	Brussels, Belgium	7 September 2012
Olympic record	Liu Xiang (CHN)	12.91	Athens, Greece	27 August 2004
World Leading	Omar McLeod (JAM)	12.98	Shanghai, China	14 May 2016

Area	Time (s)	Wind	Athlete	Nation
Africa (records)	13.24	+0.3	Lehann Fourie	South Africa
Asia (records)	12.88	+1.1	Liu Xiang	China
Europe (records)	12.91	+0.5	Colin Jackson	Great Britain
North, Central America and Caribbean (records)	12.80 WR	+0.3	Aries Merritt	United States
Oceania (records)	13.29	+0.6	Kyle Vander Kuyp	Australia
South America (records)	13.27	+1.6	Paulo Villar	Colombia

== Schedule ==
All times are Brasilia Time (UTC-3)

Date	Time	Round
Monday, 15 August 2016	20:40	Heats
Tuesday, 16 August 2016	20:40; 22:45	Semifinals; Finals

== Results ==
=== Round 1 ===
Qualification rule: first 4 of each heat (Q) plus the 4 fastest times (q) qualified.

==== Heat 1 ====
Rank	Lane	Athlete	Nation	Reaction	Time	Notes
1	2	Omar McLeod	Jamaica	0.168	13.27	Q
2	7	Jeff Porter	United States	0.147	13.50	Q
3	9	Jeffrey Julmis	Haiti	0.149	13.66	Q
4	8	Antwon Hicks	Nigeria	0.151	13.70	Q
5	4	Yeison Rivas	Colombia	0.143	13.84	R
6	6	Wataru Yazawa	Japan	0.144	13.89	R
7	3	Kame Ali	Madagascar	0.152	14.89	R, SB
—	5	Alexander John	Germany	0.173	DQ	R168.7, R
				Wind: +0.1 m/s		

==== Heat 2 ====
Rank	Lane	Athlete	Nation	Reaction	Time	Notes
1	8	Orlando Ortega	Spain	0.124	13.32	Q
2	3	Balázs Baji	Hungary	0.151	13.52	Q
3	5	Milan Trajkovic	Cyprus	0.143	13.59	Q
4	2	Johnathan Cabral	Canada	0.153	13.63	Q
5	9	Jhoanis Portilla	Cuba	0.122	13.81	R
6	6	Matthias Buhler	Germany	0.145	13.82	R
7	4	Xaysa Anousone	Laos	0.134	14.40	R
—	7	Deuce Carter	Jamaica	0.176	DQ	R168.7, R
				Wind: +0.4 m/s		

==== Heat 3 ====
Petr Svoboda was originally disqualified under Rule 168.7. His advancement later to the semifinals indicates a reversal of that decision.

Rank	Lane	Athlete	Nation	Reaction	Time	Notes
1	4	Dimitri Bascou	France	0.151	13.31	Q
2	9	Andrew Pozzi	Great Britain	0.127	13.50	Q
3	6	Andrew Riley	Jamaica	0.136	13.52	Q
4	8	João Vítor de Oliveira	Brazil	0.121	13.63	Q, SB
5	3	Antonio Alkana	South Africa	0.128	13.64	q
6	2	Petr Svoboda	Czech Republic	0.132	13.65	q
7	7	Mikel Thomas	Trinidad and Tobago	0.131	13.68	
8	5	Eddie Lovett	Virgin Islands	0.143	13.77	
				Wind: +1.4 m/s		

==== Heat 4 ====
Rank	Lane	Athlete	Nation	Reaction	Time	Notes
1	2	Konstadinos Douvalidis	Greece	0.124	13.41	Q
2	9	Devon Allen	United States	0.127	13.41	Q
3	5	Gregor Traber	Germany	0.149	13.50	Q
4	6	Yordan O'Farrill	Cuba	0.130	13.56	Q
5	7	Yidiel Contreras	Spain	0.137	13.62	q
6	4	Ronald Forbes	Cayman Islands	0.131	14.67	
7	8	Ahmad Hazer	Lebanon	0.144	15.50	
—	3	Wilhem Belocian	France	DQ		R162.7
				Wind: +0.1 m/s		

==== Heat 5 ====
Rank	Lane	Athlete	Nation	Reaction	Time	Notes
1	9	Ronnie Ash	United States	0.149	13.31	Q
2	3	Pascal Martinot-Lagarde	France	0.148	13.36	Q
3	5	Lawrence Clarke	Great Britain	0.146	13.55	Q
4	8	Éder Antônio Souza	Brazil	0.134	13.61	Q, SB
5	2	Damian Czykier	Poland	0.162	13.63	q
6	7	Milan Ristic	Serbia	0.133	13.66	
7	4	Xie Wenjun	China	0.166	13.69	
8	6	Sekou Kaba	Canada	0.141	13.70	
				Wind: −0.2 m/s		

=== Repechage ===
Rank	Lane	Athlete	Nation	Reaction	Time	Notes
1	9	Deuce Carter	Jamaica	0.174	13.51	q
2	4	Yeison Rivas	Colombia	0.165	13.87	
3	6	Wataru Yazawa	Japan	0.141	13.88	
4	8	Matthias Buhler	Germany	0.141	13.90	
5	2	Alexander John	Germany	0.165	14.13	
—	7	Jhoanis Portilla	Cuba	0.137	DQ	R168.7
—	3	Kame Ali	Madagascar	DNS		
—	5	Xaysa Anousone	Laos	DNS		
				Wind: −0.1 m/s		

=== Semifinals ===
==== Semifinal 1 ====
Rank	Lane	Athlete	Nation	Reaction	Time	Notes
1	7	Orlando Ortega	Spain	0.138	13.32	Q
2	5	Ronnie Ash	United States	0.183	13.36	Q
3	2	Damian Czykier	Poland	0.154	13.50	
4	6	Balázs Baji	Hungary	0.129	13.52	
5	4	Andrew Pozzi	Great Britain	0.127	13.67	
6	3	Deuce Carter	Jamaica	0.171	13.69	
7	8	Yordan O'Farrill	Cuba	0.153	13.70	
—	9	Jeffrey Julmis	Haiti	0.156	DQ	R168.7
				Wind: +0.5 m/s		

==== Semifinal 2 ====
Rank	Lane	Athlete	Nation	Reaction	Time	Notes
1	7	Omar McLeod	Jamaica	0.147	13.15	Q
2	5	Pascal Martinot-Lagarde	France	0.149	13.25	Q
3	6	Devon Allen	United States	0.120	13.36	q
4	9	Johnathan Cabral	Canada	0.134	13.41	q
5	4	Gregor Traber	Germany	0.181	13.43	
6	8	Lawrence Clarke	Great Britain	0.169	13.46	
7	2	Antonio Alkana	South Africa	0.126	13.55	
8	1	Petr Svoboda	Czech Republic	0.181	13.67	
9	3	João Vítor de Oliveira	Brazil	0.194	13.85	
				Wind: −0.1 m/s		

==== Semifinal 3 ====
Rank	Lane	Athlete	Nation	Reaction	Time	Notes
1	5	Dimitri Bascou	France	0.152	13.23	Q
2	8	Milan Trajkovic	Cyprus	0.135	13.31	Q
3	4	Jeff Porter	United States	0.150	13.45	
4	6	Andrew Riley	Jamaica	0.150	13.46	
5	7	Konstadinos Douvalidis	Greece	0.145	13.47	
6	3	Yidiel Contreras	Spain	0.142	13.54	
7	2	Antwon Hicks	Nigeria	0.170	14.26	
—	9	Éder Antônio Souza	Brazil	0.137	DQ	R168.7
				Wind: +0.3 m/s		

=== Final ===
Rank	Lane	Athlete	Nation	Reaction	Time	Notes
1st place, gold medalist(s)	5	Omar McLeod	Jamaica	0.142	13.05	
2nd place, silver medalist(s)	7	Orlando Ortega	Spain	0.127	13.17	
3rd place, bronze medalist(s)	6	Dimitri Bascou	France	0.131	13.24	
4	4	Pascal Martinot-Lagarde	France	0.142	13.29	
5	3	Devon Allen	United States	0.135	13.31	
6	2	Johnathan Cabral	Canada	0.146	13.40	
7	8	Milan Trajkovic	Cyprus	0.136	13.41	
—	9	Ronnie Ash	United States	0.160	DQ	R168.7
				Wind: +0.2 m/s		
