= 2017 World Championships in Athletics – Men's 110 metres hurdles =

Men's 110 metres hurdles at the 2017 World Championships
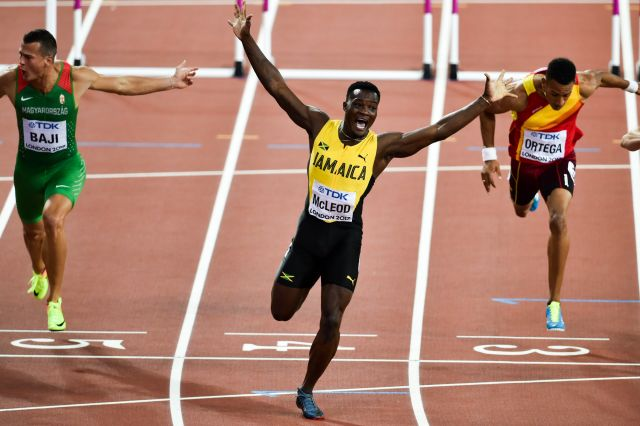
- The finish of the final.
- Venue: Olympic Stadium
- Dates: 6 August (heats & semifinal); 7 August (final)
- Competitors: 41 from 28 nations
- Winning time: 13.04

Medalists
gold medal	Omar McLeod	Jamaica
silver medal	Sergey Shubenkov	Authorised Neutral Athletes
bronze medal	Balázs Baji	Hungary

The men's 110 metres hurdles at the 2017 World Championships in Athletics was held at the London Olympic Stadium on 6−7 August.

== Summary ==
Russian defending champion Sergey Shubenkov, having missed the Olympics due to the drugs scandal, was competing as an Authorised Neutral Athlete. Since the last World Championships, Omar McLeod (Jamaica) had won the Indoor World title and the Olympics and had the year's fastest time. The returning silver medallist was his countryman Hansle Parchment, while the returning bronze medalist was world record holder Aries Merritt (United States), who underwent a kidney transplant four days after the previous championships.

In the final, from the gun, McLeod had a slight lead over the first hurdle and retained the lead throughout. Shubenkov looked to be the only athlete gaining on him from behind. Balázs Baji (Hungary) was close over the first hurdle, but after hitting the second hurdle fell back to sixth before recovering to take the bronze.

== Records ==
Before the competition records were as follows:

Record	Perf.	Athlete	Nat.	Date	Location
World	12.80	Aries Merritt	USA	7 Sep 2012	Brussels, Belgium
Championship	12.91	Colin Jackson	GBR	20 Aug 1993	Stuttgart, Germany
World leading	12.90	Omar McLeod	JAM	24 Jun 2017	Kingston, Jamaica
African	13.11	Antonio Alkana	RSA	5 Jun 2017	Prague, Czechia
Asian	12.88	Liu Xiang	CHN	11 Jul 2006	Lausanne, Switzerland
NACAC	12.80	Aries Merritt	USA	7 Sep 2012	Brussels, Belgium
South American	13.27A	Paulo Villar	COL	28 Oct 2011	Guadalajara, Mexico
European	12.91	Colin Jackson	GBR	20 Aug 1993	Stuttgart, Germany
Oceanian	13.29	Kyle Vander Kuyp	AUS	11 Aug 1995	Gothenburg, Sweden

No records were set at the competition.

== Qualification standard ==
The standard to qualify automatically for entry was 13.48.

== Schedule ==
The event schedule, in local time (UTC+1), was as follows:

Date	Time	Round
6 August	13:15	Heats
6 August	20:10	Semifinals
7 August	21:30	Final

== Results ==
=== Heats ===
The first round took place on 6 August in five heats as follows:

Heat	1	2	3	4	5
Start time	13:14	13:22	13:30	13:38	13:46
Wind (m/s)	−1.5	+1.3	+0.1	+0.7	+0.6
Photo finish	link	link	link	link	link

The first four in each heat ( Q ) and the next four fastest ( q ) qualified for the semifinals. The overall results were as follows:

Rank	Heat	Lane	Name	Nationality	Time	Notes
1	3	8	Aries Merritt	United States	13.16	Q
2	1	1	Omar McLeod	Jamaica	13.23	Q
3	2	7	Devon Allen	United States	13.26	Q
4	4	7	Andrew Pozzi	Great Britain & N.I.	13.28	Q
5	4	8	Xie Wenjun	China	13.34	Q
6	1	3	Balázs Baji	Hungary	13.35	Q
7	2	4	Garfield Darien	France	13.36	Q
8	5	2	Orlando Ortega	Spain	13.37	Q
9	4	3	Milan Trajkovic	Cyprus	13.38	Q
10	3	5	Shane Brathwaite	Barbados	13.39	Q
11	4	2	Yidiel Contreras	Spain	13.40	Q, SB
12	1	5	Eddie Lovett	U.S. Virgin Islands	13.41	Q, SB
13	5	5	Hansle Parchment	Jamaica	13.42	Q
14	3	6	Antonio Alkana	South Africa	13.43	Q
15	5	7	Sergey Shubenkov	Authorised Neutral Athletes	13.47	Q
16	4	6	Roger Iribarne	Cuba	13.48	q
17	1	9	Aleec Harris	United States	13.50	Q
18	4	5	Matthias Bühler	Germany	13.52	q
19	2	9	Damian Czykier	Poland	13.53	Q
20	5	6	Johnathan Cabral	Canada	13.53	Q
21	4	4	Yaqoub Mohamed Al-Youha	Kuwait	13.56	q
22	1	2	Yordan O'Farrill	Cuba	13.56	q
23	3	4	Éder Antônio Souza	Brazil	13.56	Q
24	3	9	Aurel Manga	France	13.58	
25	2	3	Genta Masuno	Japan	13.58	Q
26	1	6	David Omoregie	Great Britain & N.I.	13.59	
27	5	9	Nicholas Hough	Australia	13.61	
28	3	3	Konstadinos Douvalidis	Greece	13.62	
29	2	8	Abdulaziz Al-Mandeel	Kuwait	13.63	
30	2	2	Ruebin Walters	Trinidad and Tobago	13.63	
31	2	6	Siddhanth Thingalaya	India	13.64	
32	1	7	Shunya Takayama	Japan	13.65	
33	2	5	David King	Great Britain & N.I.	13.67	
34	3	7	Hideki Omuro	Japan	13.78	
35	5	4	Jeffrey Julmis	Haiti	13.78	
36	3	2	Kim Byoung-jun	South Korea	13.81	
37	5	3	Mikel Thomas	Trinidad and Tobago	13.98	
38	1	4	Ahmad Hazer	Lebanon	14.51	
39	1	8	Xaysa Anousone	Laos	14.55	
	4	9	Ronald Levy	Jamaica	DNF	
	5	8	Milan Ristić	Serbia	DQ	

=== Semifinals ===
The semifinals took place on 6 August in three heats as follows:

Heat	1	2	3
Start time	20:10	20:18	20:26
Wind (m/s)	+0.2	+0.6	+0.3
Photo finish	link	link	link

The first two in each heat ( Q ) and the next two fastest ( q ) qualified for the final. The overall results were as follows:

Rank	Heat	Lane	Name	Nationality	Time	Notes
1	1	7	Omar McLeod	Jamaica	13.10	Q
2	1	6	Garfield Darien	France	13.17	Q
3	1	9	Sergey Shubenkov	Authorised Neutral Athletes	13.22	q
4	1	4	Orlando Ortega	Spain	13.23	q
5	3	5	Balázs Baji	Hungary	13.23	Q
6	3	7	Aries Merritt	United States	13.25	Q
7	2	5	Shane Brathwaite	Barbados	13.26	Q, SB
8	2	7	Hansle Parchment	Jamaica	13.27	Q
9	2	4	Devon Allen	United States	13.27	
10	2	6	Andrew Pozzi	Great Britain & N.I.	13.28	
11	1	5	Milan Trajkovic	Cyprus	13.32	
12	3	4	Xie Wenjun	China	13.36	
13	1	8	Aleec Harris	United States	13.40	
14	2	9	Damian Czykier	Poland	13.42	
15	2	3	Roger Iribarne	Cuba	13.43	
16	3	9	Antonio Alkana	South Africa	13.59	
17	2	8	Yidiel Contreras	Spain	13.65	
18	3	6	Eddie Lovett	U.S. Virgin Islands	13.67	
19	3	3	Éder Antônio Souza	Brazil	13.70	
20	1	2	Genta Masuno	Japan	13.79	
21	2	2	Matthias Bühler	Germany	13.79	
22	3	8	Johnathan Cabral	Canada	14.98	
	1	3	Yaqoub Mohamed Al-Youha	Kuwait	DNF	
	3	2	Yordan O'Farrill	Cuba	DNF	

=== Final ===
The final took place on 7 August at 21:31. The wind was 0.0 metres per second and the results were as follows (photo finish):

Rank	Lane	Name	Nationality	Time	Notes
1st place, gold medalist(s)	4	Omar McLeod	Jamaica	13.04	
2nd place, silver medalist(s)	2	Sergey Shubenkov	Authorised Neutral Athletes	13.14	
3rd place, bronze medalist(s)	5	Balázs Baji	Hungary	13.28	
4	6	Garfield Darien	France	13.30	
5	9	Aries Merritt	United States	13.31	
6	7	Shane Brathwaite	Barbados	13.32	
7	3	Orlando Ortega	Spain	13.37	
8	8	Hansle Parchment	Jamaica	13.37	
