= João Vítor de Oliveira =

Brazilian hurdler

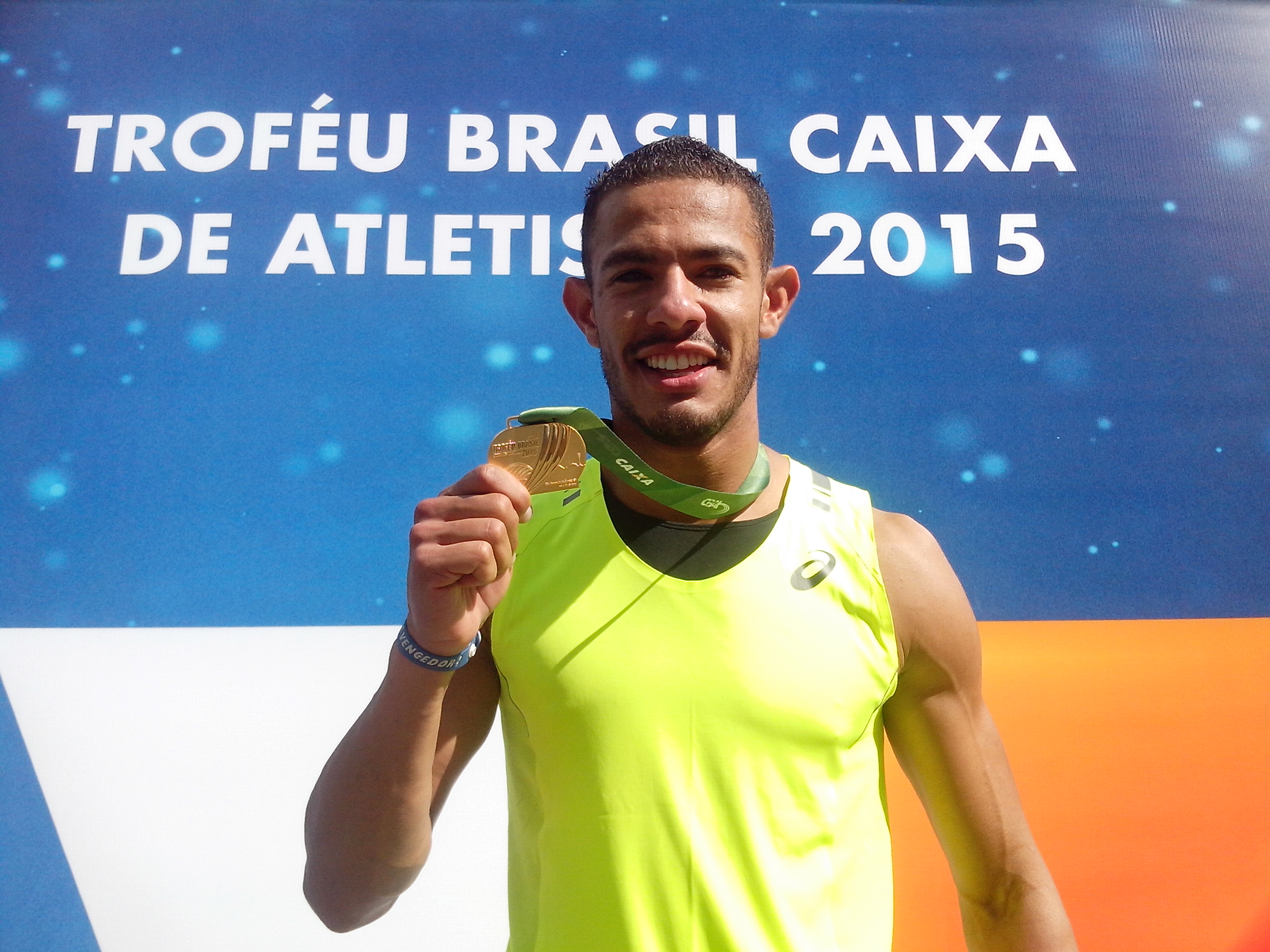
- João Vítor de Oliveira in 2015

Personal information
- Born: 15 May 1992 (age 34) Marília, Brazil
- Height: 1.89 m (6 ft 2 in)
- Weight: 87 kg (192 lb)

Sport
- Sport: Track and field
- Event: 110 metres hurdles
- Club: Benfica

João Vítor de Oliveira (born 15 May 1992) is a Brazilian hurdler. He competed in the 110 metres hurdles event at the 2015 World Championships in Beijing reaching the semifinals. His personal best in the 110 metres hurdles is 13.45 seconds (8.2 m/s), set in Beijing in 2015.

== Competition record ==
Year	Competition	Venue	Position	Event	Notes
Representing Brazil
2010	World Junior Championships	Moncton, Canada	9th (sf)	110 m hurdles (99 cm)	13.79
2010	World Junior Championships	Moncton, Canada	15th (sf)	400 m hurdles	52.53
2011	Pan American Junior Championships	Miramar, United States	3rd	110 m hurdles (99 cm)	13.97
2011	South American Junior Championships	Medellín, Colombia	1st	110 m hurdles (99 cm)	13.85
2011	South American Junior Championships	Medellín, Colombia	1st	400 m hurdles	52.62
2012	South American U23 Championships	São Paulo, Brazil	1st	110 m hurdles	14.14
2015	South American Championships	Lima, Peru	1st	110 m hurdles	13.96
2015	World Championships	Beijing, China	18th (sf)	110 m hurdles	13.45
2016	World Indoor Championships	Portland, United States	25th (h)	60 m hurdles	7.99
2016	Ibero-American Championships	Rio de Janeiro, Brazil	6th	110 m hurdles	13.90
2016	Olympic Games	Rio de Janeiro	22nd (sf)	110 m hurdles	13.85
Representing Portugal
2022	Mediterranean Games	Oran, Algeria	9th (h)	110 m hurdles	13.92
2022	European Championships	Munich, Germany	21st (sf)	110 m hurdles	13.92
2024	Ibero-American Championships	Cuiabá, Brazil	6th	110 m hurdles	13.62 (w)
