= Konstantinos Douvalidis =

Greek hurdler (born 1987)

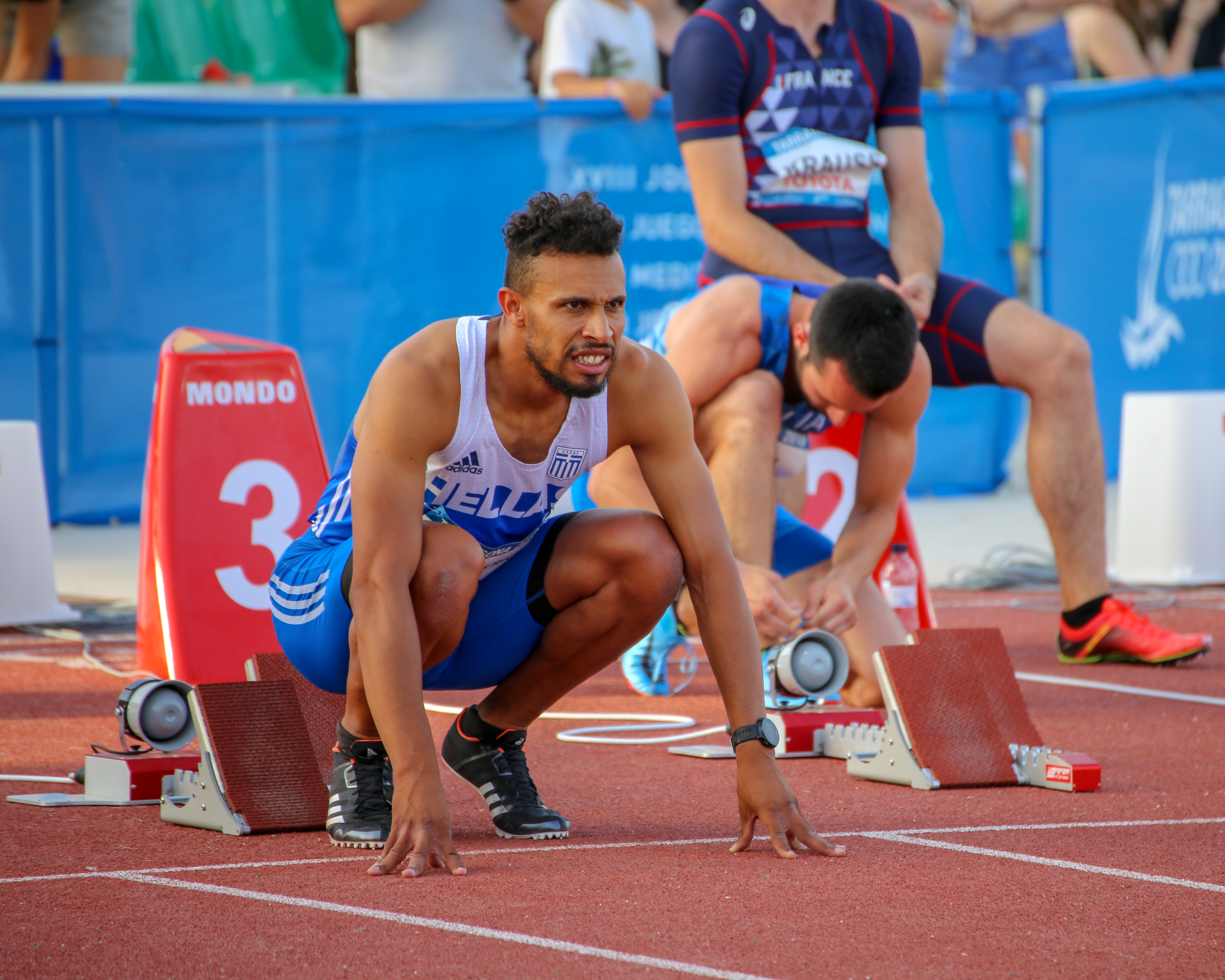
- Kostas Douvalidis in 2018

Personal information
- Born: 10 March 1987 (age 39) Drama, Greece
- Height: 1.81 m (5 ft 11 in)
- Weight: 78 kg (172 lb)

Sport
- Country: Greece
- Sport: Athletics
- Events: 110 m hurdles 60 m hurdles

Achievements and titles
- Personal bests: 13.33 sec NR; 7.59 sec NR
Medal record
European Games
Bronze medal – third place	2019 Minsk	110 m hurdles
Mediterranean Games
Gold medal – first place	Mersin 2013	110 m hurdles
Bronze medal – third place	Tarragona 2018	110 m hurdles

Konstantinos "Kostas" Douvalidis (Greek: Κώστας Δουβαλίδης; born 10 March 1987) is a Greek hurdler.

He was born in Drama to an American father and a Greek mother. As a junior, he won the silver medal at the 2005 European Athletics Championships, the bronze medal at the 2006 World Junior Championships and the gold medal at the 2007 European U23 Championships. He was sixth at the 2015 European Indoor Championships and eighth at the 2012 European Championships.

He competed at the 2007 World Championships, the 2008 Olympic Games without reaching the final. He has participated in four consecutive Olympic Games (2008–2020). During his career Douvalidis won the Greek Athletics Championships 17 times (2007–2025).

== International competitions ==
Year	Competition	Venue	Position	Event	Notes
Representing Greece
2005	European Junior Championships	Kaunas, Lithuania	2nd	110 m h (91.4 cm)	13.99 s
2006	World Junior Championships	Beijing, China	3rd	110 m h (99.0 cm)	13.39 s (+1.5 m/s) NJ
2007	World Championships	Osaka, Japan	28th (h)	110 m h	13.74 s
2007	European U23 Championships	Debrecen, Hungary	1st	110 m h	13.49 s (−0.4 m/s) NR
2007	European U23 Championships	Debrecen, Hungary	7th (h)^{†}	4 × 100 m relay	40.10^{†}
2008	Olympic Games	Beijing, China	11th (sf)	110 m h	13.55 s
2009	European Indoor Championships	Torino, Italy	14th (sf)	60 m h	7.82 s
2010	European Championships	Barcelona, Spain	17th (h)	110 m h	13.80 s
2011	World Championships	Daegu, South Korea	19th (h)	110 m h	13.59 s
2012	World Indoor Championships	Istanbul, Turkey	17th (h)	60 m h	7.83 s
2012	European Championships	Helsinki, Finland	8th	110 m h	13.59 s
2012	Olympic Games	London, UK	23rd (sf)	110 m h	13.77 s
2013	European Indoor Championships	Gothenburg, Sweden	7th	60 m h	7.64 s
2013	Mediterranean Games	Mersin, Turkey	1st	110 m h	13.45 s (CR)
2013	World Championships	Moscow, Russia	19th (h)	110 m h	13.55 s
2014	World Indoor Championships	Sopot, Poland	9th (sf)	60 m h	7.62 s
2014	European Championships	Zurich, Switzerland	15th (sf)	110 m h	13.66 s
2015	European Indoor Championships	Prague, Czech Republic	6th	60 m h	7.64 s
2015	World Championships	Beijing, China	24h (sf)	110m h	13.79 s
2016	World Indoor Championships	Portland, USA	15th (sf)	60 m h	7.79 s
2016	European Championships	Amsterdam, Netherlands	11th (sf)	110 m h	13.50 s
2016	Olympic Games	Rio de Janeiro, Brazil	13th (sf)	110 m h	13.47 s
2017	World Championships	London, UK	28th (h)	110 m h	13.62 s
2018	World Indoor Championships	Birmingham, UK	14th (sf)	60 m h	7.68 s
2018	Mediterranean Games	Tarragona, Spain	3rd	110 m h	13.67 s
2018	European Championships	Berlin, Germany	14th (sf)	110 m h	13.56 s
2019	European Indoor Championships	Glasgow, UK	5th	60 m h	7.65 s
2019	World Championships	Doha, Qatar	14th (sf)	110 m h	13.54 s
2021	Olympic Games	Tokyo, Japan	27th (h)	110 m h	13.63 s
2022	World Indoor Championships	Belgrade, Serbia	31st (h)	60 m h	7.77 s
2023	European Indoor Championships	Istanbul, Turkey	20th (h)	60 m h	7.82 s SB
2024	World Indoor Championships	Glasgow, United Kingdom	28th (h)	60 m h	7.79 s
2024	European Championships	Rome, Italy	20th (h)	110 m hurdles	14.04 s

^{†}: Competed only in heat.

== Personal bests ==
Event	Performance	Date	Venue
110 metres hurdles	13.33 s NR	7 July 2015	Székesfehérvár, Hungary
60 meters hurdles	7.59 s NR	9 February 2020	Metz, France

Records
Preceded by (France) Ladji Doucouré	Boys' World Youth Best Holder, 110 metres hurdles 2 October 2004 – 12 July 2007	Succeeded by (United States) Wayne Davis
