= Athletics at the 2012 Summer Olympics – Men's 110 metres hurdles =

Men's 110 metres hurdles at the Games of the XXX Olympiad
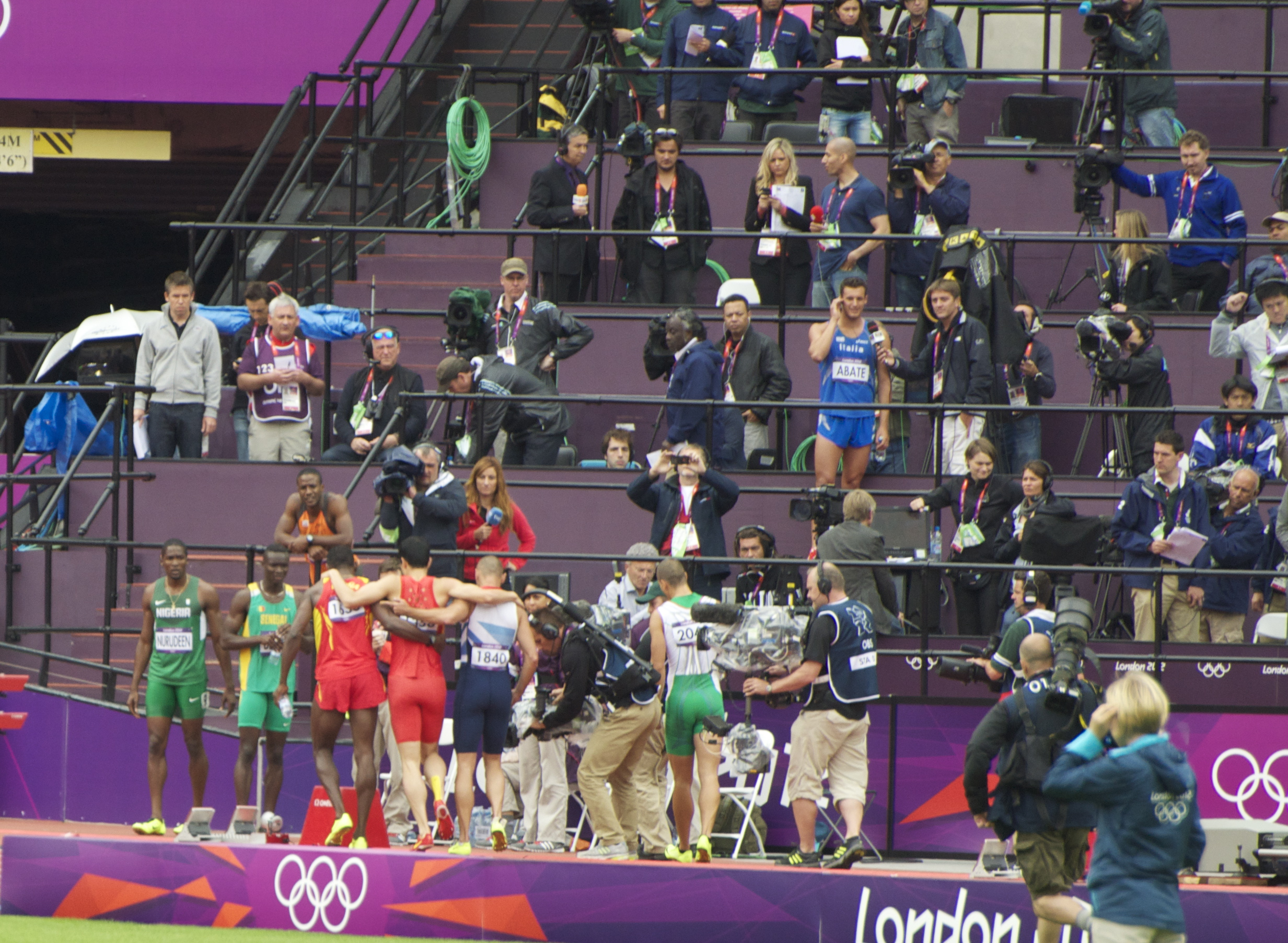
- Liu Xiang carried off by his competitors
- Venue: Olympic Stadium
- Date: 7–8 August
- Competitors: 53 from 33 nations
- Winning time: 12.92

Medalists
1st place, gold medalist(s)		Aries Merritt	United States
2nd place, silver medalist(s)		Jason Richardson	United States
3rd place, bronze medalist(s)		Hansle Parchment	Jamaica

Official Video

The men's 110 metres hurdles competition at the 2012 Summer Olympics in London, United Kingdom was held at the Olympic Stadium on 7–8 August. Fifty-three athletes from 33 nations competed. The event was won by Aries Merritt of the United States, the nation's first championship in the event since 1996 and 19th overall. Hansle Parchment's bronze was Jamaica's first medal in the men's high hurdles.

== Summary ==
The qualifying round was notable for who was eliminated. In heat 3, Shamar Sands was in the lead until he hit the sixth hurdle, crashing into the next hurdle and somersaulting into a heap, making him one of three athletes in that heat not to make it to the finish line. In the fifth heat, Aries Merritt ran the fastest qualifying time by far with a 13.07. In the final heat, 2004 gold medalist Liu Xiang reminded viewers of his 2008 performance, failing to clear the first hurdle, and injuring his right achilles. After a minute on the track, Liu got up onto his left leg and hopped off the track. Refusing a wheelchair assist and medical attention, he returned to the track and hopped all the way to the final hurdle. Returning to his assigned lane 4, Liu kissed the top of the tenth hurdle, perhaps signifying the end of his Olympic career. He then hopped across the finish line, where he was assisted off the track by heat winner Andy Turner, Balázs Baji and Jackson Quiñónez.

The semifinal round was again dominated by Merritt running a 12.94. World record holder and defending champion Dayron Robles led Hansle Parchment to the Jamaican national record in 13.14. 13.31 qualified on time.

In the final, Robles and Merritt got the fastest starts but Merritt pulled ahead at hurdle 3, by hurdle 5 Robles was wincing in pain, pushing over the sixth hurdle and holding his leg. Merritt continued to a personal best 12.92 and a .12 win over reigning world champion Jason Richardson. Parchment took another .02 off his national record for the bronze, the rest of the field was not even close, more than a quarter of a second behind.

Merritt moves past Renaldo Nehemiah to become the #7 hurdler of all time.

== Background ==
This was the 27th appearance of the event, which is one of 12 athletics events to have been held at every Summer Olympics. Five finalists from 2008 returned: gold medalist Dayron Robles of Cuba, fourth-place finisher Ladji Doucouré of France, fifth-place finisher Artur Noga of Poland, seventh-place finisher Richard Phillips of Jamaica, and eighth-place finisher Jackson Quiñónez of Spain. The 2004 gold medalist Liu Xiang of China, who had been unable to run in the first round in 2008 due to injury, also returned. Favorites included Liu (who had taken second at the 2011 world championships), Robles (who still held the world record), Jason Richardson of the United States (who was the 2011 world champion), and Aries Merritt of the United States (who was undefeated in 2012, including the world indoor championships).

Honduras, Iran, and Lebanon each made their first appearance in the event. The United States made its 26th appearance, most of any nation (having missed only the boycotted 1980 Games).

== Qualification ==
A National Olympic Committee (NOC) could enter up to 3 qualified athletes in the men's 110 metres hurdles event if all athletes met the A standard, or 1 athlete if they met the B standard. The maximum number of athletes per nation had been set at 3 since the 1930 Olympic Congress. The qualifying time standards could be obtained in various meets during the qualifying period that had the approval of the IAAF. Only outdoor meets, not indoor meets, were eligible. The A standard for the 2012 men's 110 metres hurdles was 13.52 seconds; the B standard was 13.60 seconds. The qualifying period for was from 1 May 2011 to 8 July 2012. NOCs could also have an athlete enter the 110 metres hurdles through a universality place. NOCs could enter one male athlete in an athletics event, regardless of time, if they had no male athletes meeting the qualifying A or B standards in any men's athletic event.

== Competition format ==
Despite a larger field than past years, the competition narrowed from four rounds to three. The men's 110 metres hurdles competition consisted of heats (Round 1), semifinals, and a final. The fastest competitors from each race in the heats qualified for the semifinals along with the fastest overall competitors not already qualified that were required to fill the available spaces in the semifinals.

== Records ==
Prior to this competition, the existing world record, Olympic record, and world leading time were as follows:

World record	Dayron Robles (CUB)	12.87	Ostrava, Czech Republic	12 June 2008
Olympic record	Liu Xiang (CHN)	12.91	Athens, Greece	27 August 2004
World Leading	Aries Merritt (USA)	12.93 (3)	Eugene, Oregon, United States (1), London, United Kingdom (2), Fontvieille, Monaco (3)	30 June 2012 (1), 13 July 2012 (2), 20 July 2012 (3)

The following national record was set during this competition.

Jamaica National Record	Hansle Parchment (JAM)	13.12

== Schedule ==
After two Games in which all rounds were on separate days, the 2012 schedule returned to having the semifinals and final on the same day.

All times are British Summer Time (UTC+1)

Date	Time	Round
Tuesday, 7 August 2012	10:10	Round 1
Wednesday, 8 August 2012	19:15; 21:15	Semifinals; Finals

== Results ==
Official Video of the First Round

=== Round 1 ===
Qual. rule: first 3 of each heat (Q) plus the 6 fastest times (q) qualified.

==== Heat 1 ====
Rank	Lane	Athlete	Nation	Reaction	Time	Notes
1	9	Sergey Shubenkov	Russia	0.157	13.26	Q
2	2	Konstadínos Douvalídis	Greece	0.163	13.40	Q
3	8	Adrien Deghelt	Belgium	0.158	13.52	Q
4	4	Garfield Darien	France	0.171	13.54	q
5	3	Paulo Villar	Colombia	0.169	13.55	q, SB
6	6	Matthias Bühler	Germany	0.157	13.68	
7	7	Shi Dongpeng	China	0.150	13.78	
8	5	David Ilariani	Georgia	0.158	13.90	
				Wind: +0.6 m/s		

==== Heat 2 ====
Rank	Lane	Athlete	Nation	Reaction	Time	Notes
1	2	Jason Richardson	United States	0.192	13.33	Q
2	6	Lawrence Clarke	Great Britain	0.160	13.42	Q
3	3	Maksim Lynsha	Belarus	0.168	13.47	Q, SB
4	7	Wayne Davis	Trinidad and Tobago	0.169	13.52	q
5	9	Andrew Riley	Jamaica	0.174	13.59	
6	5	João Carlos Almeida	Portugal	0.116	13.69	
7	8	Rouhollah Asgari	Iran	0.182	13.97	
8	1	Ronald Forbes	Cayman Islands	0.161	14.21	
—	4	Enrique Llanos	Puerto Rico	DNF		
				Wind: +0.8 m/s		

==== Heat 3 ====
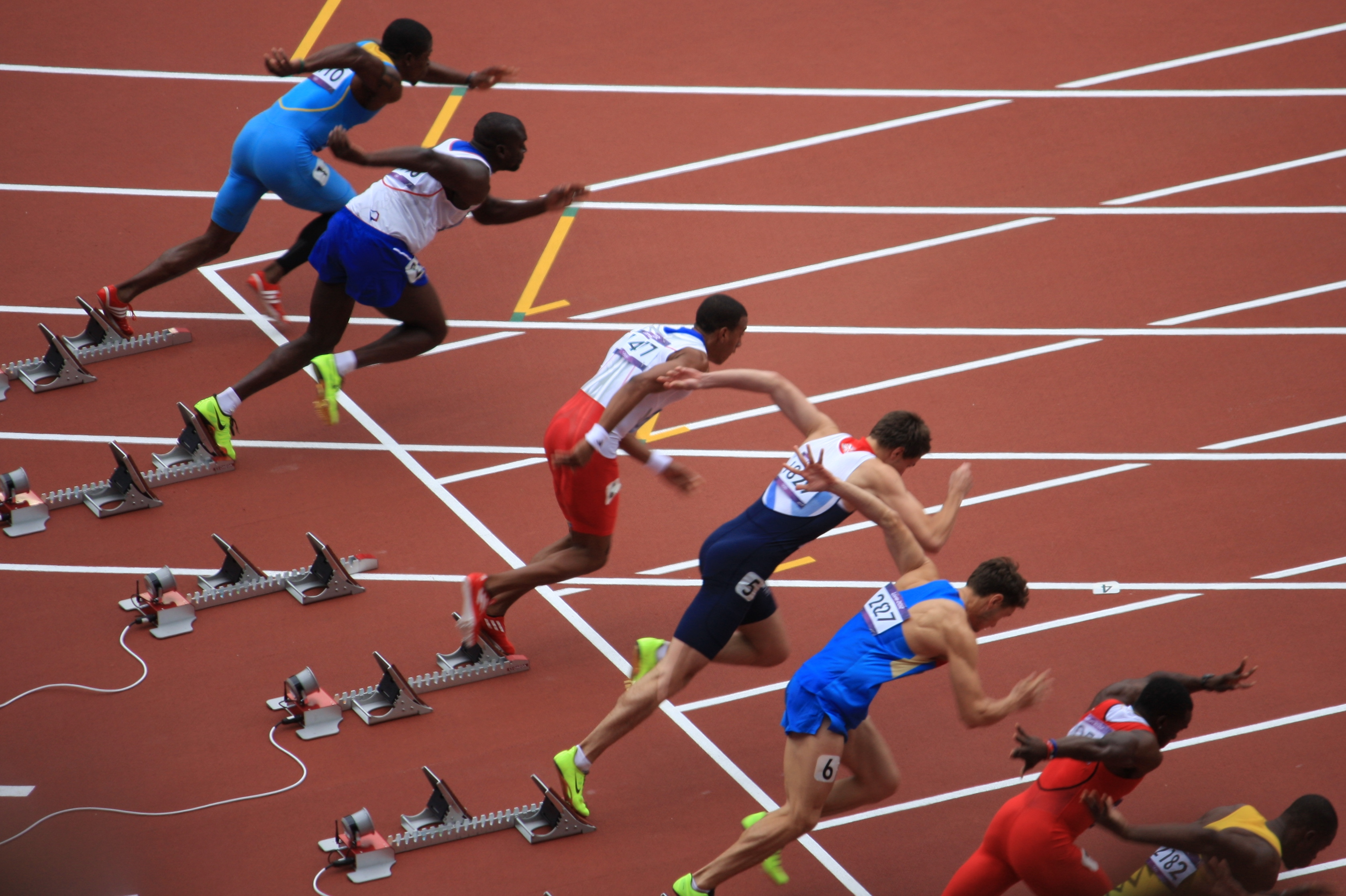
Start of heat 3, after Ali Kamé was disqualified for false starting

Ali Kamé was disqualified for false starting. Andrew Pozzi failed to finish the race. Shamar Sands crashed over the sixth hurdle; he eventually finished but was officially disqualified for not jumping each hurdle. Doucouré was obstructed by Sands and advanced to the semifinals.

Rank	Lane	Athlete	Nation	Reaction	Time	Notes
1	4	Orlando Ortega	Cuba	0.158	13.26	Q
2	8	Hansle Parchment	Jamaica	0.145	13.32	Q
3	6	Konstantin Shabanov	Russia	0.140	13.63	Q
4	2	Ladji Doucouré	France	0.170	13.67	q
5	7	Mikel Thomas	Trinidad and Tobago	0.135	13.74	
6	9	Erik Balnuweit	Germany	0.152	13.77	
—	5	Andrew Pozzi	Great Britain	0.143	DNF	
—	3	Shamar Sands	Bahamas	0.160	~~35.44~~	DSQ
—	1	Ali Kamé	Madagascar	DSQ		
				Wind: +1.2 m/s		

==== Heat 4 ====
Rank	Lane	Athlete	Nation	Reaction	Time	Notes
1	9	Dayron Robles	Cuba	0.172	13.33	Q
2	4	Lehann Fourie	South Africa	0.159	13.49	Q, SB
3	2	Jeff Porter	United States	0.148	13.53	Q
4	7	Dimitri Bascou	France	0.149	13.57	q
5	1	Greggmar Swift	Barbados	0.150	13.62	
6	6	Alexander John	Germany	0.195	13.67	
7	5	Fawaz Al-Shammari	Kuwait	0.174	14.00	
8	8	Héctor Cotto	Puerto Rico	0.158	14.08	
9	3	Ahmad Hazer	Lebanon	0.195	14.82	
				Wind: +0.1 m/s		

==== Heat 5 ====
Rank	Lane	Athlete	Nation	Reaction	Time	Notes
1	7	Aries Merritt	United States	0.142	13.07	Q
2	3	Ryan Brathwaite	Barbados	0.166	13.23	Q, SB
3	2	Xie Wenjun	China	0.143	13.43	Q
4	1	Emanuele Abate	Italy	0.146	13.46	q
5	9	Richard Phillips	Jamaica	0.154	13.47	q
6	6	Dániel Kiss	Hungary	0.188	13.62	
7	5	Aleksey Dremin	Russia	0.151	13.75	SB
8	8	Jeffrey Julmis	Haiti	0.161	13.87	
9	4	Ronald Bennett	Honduras	0.207	14.45	
				Wind: +0.7 m/s		

==== Heat 6 ====
Rank	Lane	Athlete	Nation	Reaction	Time	Notes
1	7	Andy Turner	Great Britain	0.159	13.42	Q
2	9	Selim Nurudeen	Nigeria	0.141	13.51	Q, PB
3	8	Gregory Sedoc	Netherlands	0.157	13.52	Q
4	6	Balázs Baji	Hungary	0.139	13.76	
5	3	Jackson Quiñónez	Spain	0.154	13.76	SB
—	2	Shane Brathwaite	Barbados	0.124	DNF	
—	4	Liu Xiang	China	0.123	DNF	
—	5	Artur Noga	Poland	0.173	DNF	
—	1	Moussa Dembélé	Senegal	0.167	DSQ	
				Wind: +0.4 m/s		

Official Video of the Semifinal Round

=== Semifinals ===
Qual. rule: first 2 of each heat (Q) plus the 2 fastest times (q) qualified.

==== Semifinal 1 ====
Rank	Lane	Athlete	Nation	Reaction	Time	Notes
1	5	Jason Richardson	United States	0.160	13.13	Q
2	6	Orlando Ortega	Cuba	0.151	13.26	Q
3	4	Lawrence Clarke	Great Britain	0.159	13.31	q, PB
4	8	Adrien Deghelt	Belgium	0.142	13.42	PB
5	3	Garfield Darien	France	0.154	13.48	
6	2	Wayne Davis	Trinidad and Tobago	0.165	13.49	
7	7	Konstadínos Douvalídis	Greece	0.146	13.77	
—	9	Gregory Sedoc	Netherlands	0.189	DNF	
				Wind: -0.5 m/s		

==== Semifinal 2 ====
Rank	Lane	Athlete	Nation	Reaction	Time	Notes
1	7	Aries Merritt	United States	0.147	12.94	Q
2	4	Ryan Brathwaite	Barbados	0.159	13.23	Q, SB
3	9	Xie Wenjun	China	0.158	13.34	PB
4	6	Andy Turner	Great Britain	0.151	13.42	
5	5	Selim Nurudeen	Nigeria	0.153	13.55	
6	3	Dimitri Bascou	France	0.150	13.55	
7	2	Paulo Villar	Colombia	0.177	13.63	
8	8	Konstantin Shabanov	Russia	0.154	13.65	
—	1	Richard Phillips	Jamaica	0.146	DNF	
				Wind: +0.1 m/s		

==== Semifinal 3 ====
Rank	Lane	Athlete	Nation	Reaction	Time	Notes
1	7	Dayron Robles	Cuba	0.162	13.10	Q, SB
2	5	Hansle Parchment	Jamaica	0.172	13.14	Q, NR
3	6	Lehann Fourie	South Africa	0.139	13.28	q, PB
4	2	Emanuele Abate	Italy	0.150	13.35	
5	9	Jeff Porter	United States	0.153	13.41	
6	4	Sergey Shubenkov	Russia	0.156	13.41	
7	8	Maksim Lynsha	Belarus	0.167	13.45	PB
8	3	Ladji Doucouré	France	0.189	13.74	
				Wind: +0.1 m/s		

=== Final ===
Rank	Lane	Athlete	Nation	Reaction	Time	Notes
1st place, gold medalist(s)	6	Aries Merritt	United States	0.143	12.92	PB
2nd place, silver medalist(s)	4	Jason Richardson	United States	0.194	13.04	
3rd place, bronze medalist(s)	7	Hansle Parchment	Jamaica	0.172	13.12	NR
4	2	Lawrence Clarke	Great Britain	0.169	13.39	
5	8	Ryan Brathwaite	Barbados	0.163	13.40	
6	9	Orlando Ortega	Cuba	0.135	13.43	
7	3	Lehann Fourie	South Africa	0.136	13.53	
—	5	Dayron Robles	Cuba	0.159	DNF	
				Wind: -0.3 m/s		
