= Jhoanis Portilla =

Cuban hurdler (born 1990)

Personal information
- Born: 24 July 1990 (age 35)
- Height: 1.82 m (6 ft 0 in)
- Weight: 76 kg (168 lb)

Sport
- Country: Cuba
- Sport: Track and field
- Event: 110 metres hurdles

Jhoanis Carlos Portilla (born 24 July 1990) is a Cuban hurdler. He competed in the 110 metres hurdles event at the 2015 World Championships in Beijing reaching the semifinals. His personal bests are 13.30 seconds in the 110 metres hurdles (+0.8 m/s, Toronto 2015) and 7.74 seconds in the 60 metres hurdles (Sopot 2014).

== Competition record ==
Year	Competition	Venue	Position	Event	Notes
Representing Cuba
2008	World Junior Championships	Bydgoszcz, Poland	–	110 m hurdles (99 cm)	DNF
2014	World Indoor Championships	Sopot, Poland	16th (sf)	60 m hurdles	8.03
2014	Pan American Sports Festival	Mexico City, Mexico	5th	110 m hurdles	13.72
2014	Central American and Caribbean Games	Xalapa, Mexico	2nd	110 m hurdles	13.53
2015	Pan American Games	Toronto, Canada	5th	110 m hurdles	13.30
2015	NACAC Championships	San José, Costa Rica	2nd	110 m hurdles	13.30
2015	World Championships	Beijing, China	11th (h)	110 m hurdles	13.43
2016	World Indoor Championships	Portland, United States	18th (h)	60 m hurdles	7.77
2016	Olympic Games	Rio de Janeiro, Brazil	26th (h)	110 m hurdles	13.81
