= Shane Brathwaite =

Barbadian hurdler (born 1990)

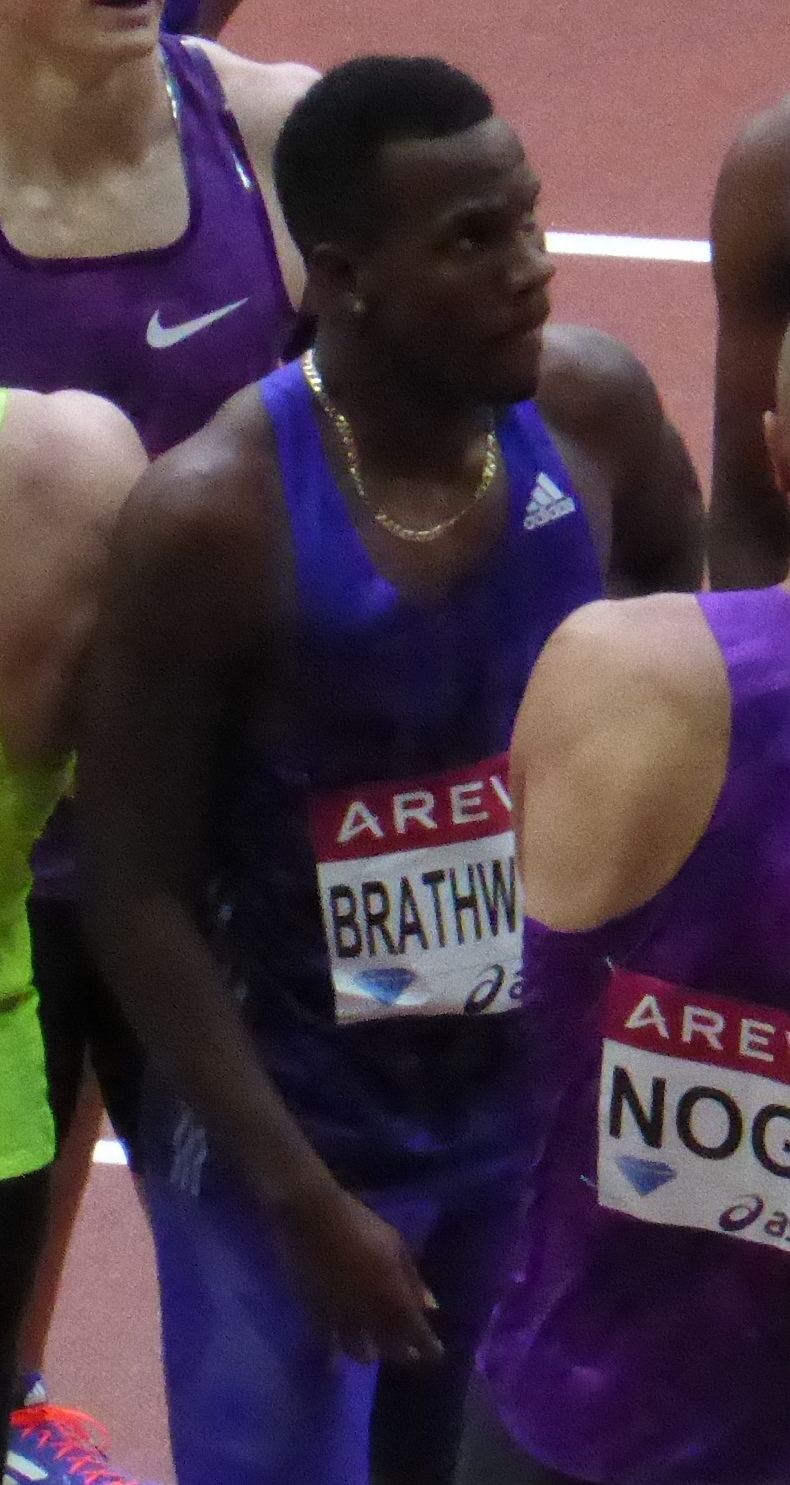
- Brathwaite in 2015

Personal information
- Nationality: Barbados
- Born: 8 February 1990 (age 36) Bridgetown, Barbados
- Height: 6 ft 0 in (1.83 m)
- Weight: 190 lb (86 kg)

Sport
- Sport: Track and field
- Event: 110 m hurdles
- College team: Texas Tech Red Raiders
- Coached by: Darryl Woodson

Achievements and titles
- Personal best: 110 m hurdles 13.21 (+0.8 m/s) (Toronto 2015)
Medal record
Men's athletics
Representing Barbados
Pan American Games
Gold medal – first place	2019 Lima	110 m hurdles
Bronze medal – third place	2015 Toronto	110 m hurdles
Central American and Caribbean Games
Gold medal – first place	2023 San Salvador	110 m hurdles
CAC Championships
Gold medal – first place	2013 Morelia	110 m hurdles

Shane Rashad Brathwaite (born 8 February 1990) is a Barbadian hurdler who competed in the 110 metres hurdles at the 2012 Summer Olympics but did not finish the race in the qualifying heats. His gold medal in the octathlon at the 2007 World Youth Championships in Athletics made him the first person from Barbados to win a gold medal at a global athletics championship.

He competed at the 2020 Summer Olympics.

Brathwaite competed for Texas Tech University at Lubbock, Texas. Although he shares a birthplace, surname and specialty with Ryan Brathwaite, the two are not related.

== Competition record ==
Year	Competition	Venue	Position	Event	Notes
Representing Barbados
2006	Central American and Caribbean; Junior Championships (U17)	Port of Spain, Trinidad and Tobago	1st	Octathlon	4599 pts
2007	CARIFTA Games (U20)	Providenciales, Turks and Caicos Islands	4th	Heptathlon (junior)	4409 pts
2007	World Youth Championships	Ostrava, Czech Republic	1st	Octathlon	6261 pts
2008	CARIFTA Games (U20)	Basseterre, Saint Kitts and Nevis	3rd	4 × 100 m relay	41.59
2008	CARIFTA Games (U20)	Basseterre, Saint Kitts and Nevis	1st	Heptathlon (junior)	5006 pts
2008	World Junior Championships	Bydgoszcz, Poland	21st (sf)	400m hurdles	53.09
2009	Pan American Junior Championships	Port of Spain, Trinidad and Tobago	3rd	110 m hurdles (99 cm)	13.41
2010	NACAC U23 Championships	Miramar, United States	4th	110m hurdles	13.80 (+3.1 m/s) w
2010	Central American and Caribbean Games	Mayagüez, Puerto Rico	6th	110 m hurdles	14.04
2011	Central American and Caribbean Championships	Mayagüez, Puerto Rico	4th	110 m hurdles	13.75
2012	NACAC U23 Championships	Irapuato, Mexico	1st	110m hurdles	13.31 (+1.8 m/s) A
2012	NACAC U23 Championships	Irapuato, Mexico	5th	4 × 100 m relay	40.30 A
2012	Olympic Games	London, United Kingdom	–	110 m hurdles	DNF
2013	Central American and Caribbean Championships	Morelia, Mexico	1st	110m hurdles	13.70
2013	Central American and Caribbean Championships	Morelia, Mexico	4th	4 × 100 m relay	39.56
2014	Commonwealth Games	Glasgow, United Kingdom	3rd	110 m hurdles	13.49
2015	World Championships	Beijing, China	10th (sf)	110m hurdles	13.31
2016	World Indoor Championships	Portland, United States	8th	60 m hurdles	7.88
2017	World Championships	London, United Kingdom	6th	110 m hurdles	13.32
2017	World Championships	London, United Kingdom	14th (h)	4 × 100 m relay	39.19
2018	Commonwealth Games	Gold Coast, Australia	–	200 m	DQ
2018	Commonwealth Games	Gold Coast, Australia	6th	110 m hurdles	13.53
2018	Commonwealth Games	Gold Coast, Australia	5th	4 × 100 m relay	39.04
2018	Central American and Caribbean Games	Barranquilla, Colombia	10th (sf)	200 m	20.96
2018	Central American and Caribbean Games	Barranquilla, Colombia	1st	110 m hurdles	13.38
2018	Central American and Caribbean Games	Barranquilla, Colombia	1st	4 × 100 m relay	38.41
2018	NACAC Championships	Toronto, Canada	3rd	110 m hurdles	13.52
2019	Pan American Games	Lima, Peru	1st	110 m hurdles	13.31
2019	World Championships	Doha, Qatar	6th	110 m hurdles	13.61
2021	Olympic Games	Tokyo, Japan	28th (h)	110 m hurdles	13.64
2022	World Championships	Eugene, United States	5th (sf)	110 m hurdles	13.21^{1}
2022	Commonwealth Games	Birmingham, United Kingdom	2nd	110 m hurdles	13.30
2022	NACAC Championships	Freeport, Bahamas	4th	110 m hurdles	13.42
2023	Central American and Caribbean Games	San Salvador, El Salvador	1st	110 m hurdles	13.64

^{1}Disqualified in the final
