= Yidiel Contreras =

Spanish hurdler (born 1992)

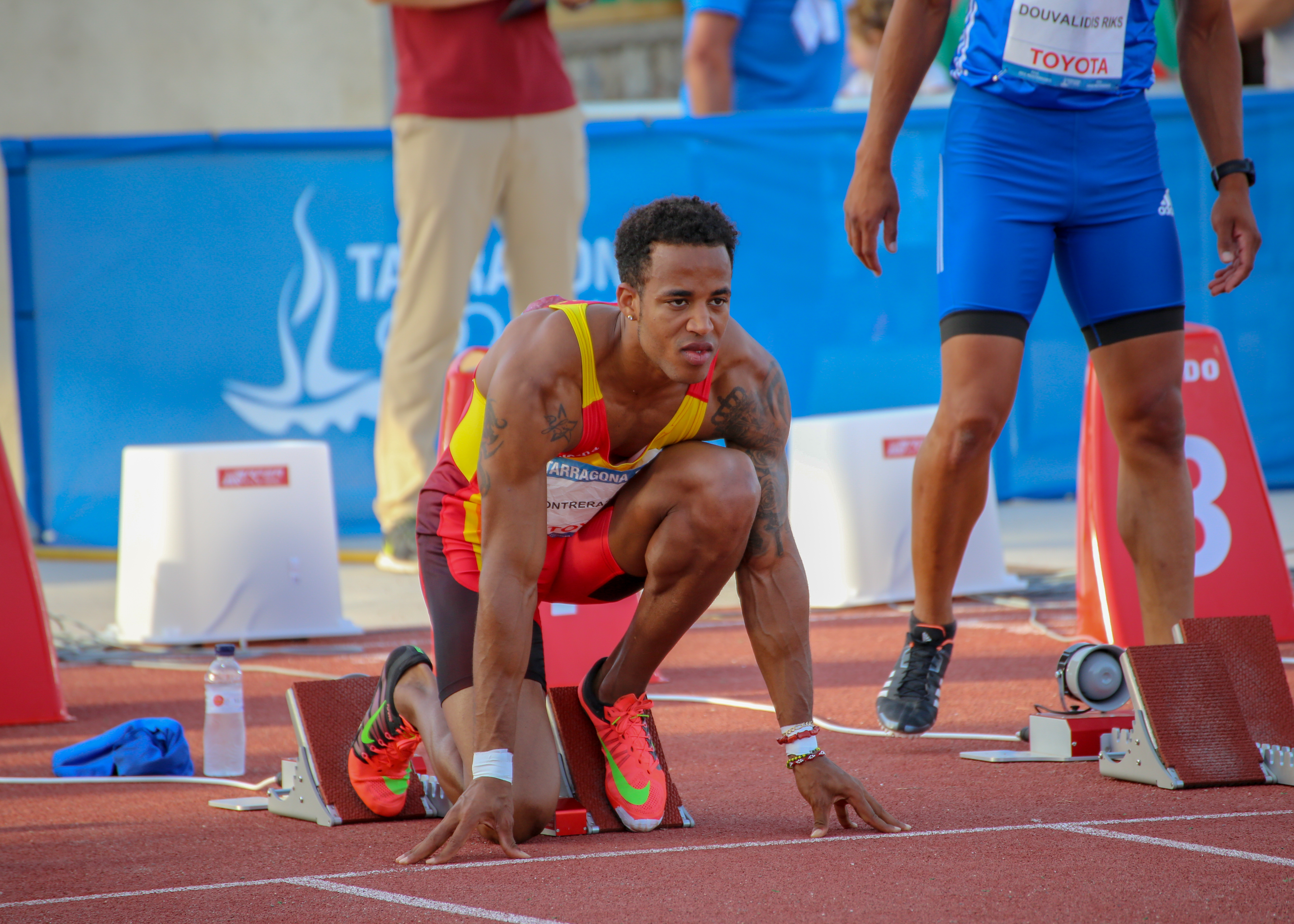
- Yidiel Contreras in 2018

Personal information
- Born: 27 November 1992 (age 33) Cienfuegos, Cuba
- Height: 1.85 m (6 ft 1 in)
- Weight: 78 kg (172 lb)

Sport
- Sport: Track and field
- Event: 110 metres hurdles
- Club: Playas de Castellón
- Coached by: Alexis Sánchez
Medal record
Men's Athletics
Representing Spain
Mediterranean Games
Silver medal – second place	Tarragona 2018	110 m hurdles

Yidiel Islay Contreras García (born 27 November 1992) is a Spanish hurdler of Cuban origin. He represented Spain at the 2015 World Championships and 2016 World Indoor Championships. His personal bests are 13.35 seconds in the 110 metres hurdles (-1.0 m/s, La Roche-sur-Yon 2015) and 7.64 seconds in the 60 metres hurdles (Łódź 2016).

== Competition record ==
Year	Competition	Venue	Position	Event	Notes
Representing Spain
2015	World Championships	Beijing, China	21st (sf)	110 m hurdles	13.57
2016	World Indoor Championships	Portland, United States	11th (sf)	60 m hurdles	7.71
2016	European Championships	Amsterdam, Netherlands	7th	110 m hurdles	13.54
2016	Olympic Games	Rio de Janeiro, Brazil	16th (sf)	110 m hurdles	13.54
2017	European Indoor Championships	Belgrade, Serbia	20th (h)	60 m hurdles	8.04
2017	World Championships	London, United Kingdom	17st (sf)	110 m hurdles	13.65
2018	World Indoor Championships	Birmingham, United Kingdom	13th (sf)	60 m hurdles	7.68
2018	Mediterranean Games	Tarragona, Spain	2nd	110 m hurdles	13.54
2019	European Indoor Championships	Glasgow, United Kingdom	–	60 m hurdles	DQ
2019	European Games	Minsk, Belarus	5th	110 m hurdles	13.86
