= 2018 IAAF World Indoor Championships – Men's 60 metres hurdles =

International sports organization

Men's 60 metres hurdles at the 2018 IAAF World Indoor Championships
- Venue: Arena Birmingham
- Dates: 3–4 March
- Competitors: 38 from 33 nations
- Winning time: 7.46

Medalists
gold medal	Andrew Pozzi	Great Britain
silver medal	Jarret Eaton	United States
bronze medal	Aurel Manga	France

Video on YouTube Official Video

The men's 60 metres hurdles at the 2018 IAAF World Indoor Championships took place on 3 and 4 March 2018.

== Summary ==
Andrew Pozzi led both qualifying rounds to prove he was a leading contender. Four the third championship in a row, France put two athletes into the final, one of them was returning silver medalist Pascal Martinot-Lagarde in his fourth straight final. Outdoor world record holder Aries Merritt also made the final, though expectations for him are not as lofty since his kidney transplant.

After setting his national record as the #2 qualifier in the semi-finals, Milan Trajkovic false started himself out of the finals. Pozzi was the first over the first hurdle, but only inches ahead of Jarret Eaton. Between hurdles, Eaton exploded to almost a foot (30 cm) advantage over the next hurdle, about the same advantage Pozzi held over Martinot-Lagarde. Both Pozzi and Martinot-Lagarde rattled the second hurdle, though Martinot-Lagarde lost more ground being knocked off balance. Eaton extended his lead, doubling it over the third hurdle, which he rattled. Martinot-Lagarde slammed the third hurdle and was out of contention, replaced by his teammate Aurel Manga and Merritt another two feet behind Pozzi. Going over the fourth hurdle, Merritt looked to have a slight advantage over Manga but by the final barrier Manga had the advantage. Eaton slammed the final hurdle, losing some of his momentum, Pozzi caught him before the finish. Manga clearly beat Merritt to the line for bronze.

== Results ==
=== Heats ===
The heats were started on 3 March at 18:30.

Rank	Heat	Lane	Name	Nationality	Time	Notes
1	4	8	Andrew Pozzi	Great Britain	7.53	Q, SB
2	2	6	Jarret Eaton	United States	7.56	Q
3	1	1	Milan Trajkovic	Cyprus	7.56	Q
4	2	8	Roger Iribarne	Cuba	7.59	Q, PB
5	4	4	Aries Merritt	United States	7.61	Q
6	1	6	Aurel Manga	France	7.62	Q
7	5	2	Pascal Martinot-Lagarde	France	7.62	Q
8	3	7	Ahmad Al-Molad	Saudi Arabia	7.63	Q
9	3	3	Ronald Levy	Jamaica	7.65	Q
10	2	2	Balázs Baji	Hungary	7.66	Q
11	4	3	Konstadinos Douvalidis	Greece	7.66	Q, SB
12	4	6	Erik Balnuweit	Germany	7.67	Q
13	3	1	Yidiel Contreras	Spain	7.68	Q, SB
14	5	5	Petr Svoboda	Czech Republic	7.68	Q
15	1	7	Koen Smet	Netherlands	7.69	Q
16	1	4	David King	Great Britain	7.69	Q
17	5	7	Johnathan Cabral	Canada	7.70	Q
18	4	7	Xie Wenjun	China	7.71	q, SB
19	2	7	Vitali Parokhonka	Belarus	7.71	Q
20	3	5	Gabriel Constantino	Brazil	7.72	Q
21	2	4	Damian Czykier	Poland	7.75	q
22	1	2	Nicholas Hough	Australia	7.76	q, SB
23	4	5	Abdulaziz Al Mandeel	Kuwait	7.77	q
24	5	3	Eddie Lovett	United States Virgin Islands	7.78	Q
25	5	6	Hassane Fofana	Italy	7.81	
26	1	5	Vladimir Vukicevic	Norway	7.81	
27	3	2	Paolo Dal Molin	Italy	7.81	
28	2	3	Mikel Thomas	Trinidad and Tobago	7.84	SB
29	2	5	Ben Reynolds	Ireland	7.89	
30	5	4	Jason Joseph	Switzerland	7.89	
31	3	8	Siddhanth Thingalaya	India	7.93	
32	5	1	Genta Masuno	Japan	7.97	PB
33	3	4	Rio Maholtra	Indonesia	7.98	NR
34	3	6	Javier McFarlane	Peru	8.00	PB
35	4	2	Cheung Wang Fung	Hong Kong	8.06	
36	1	3	Dawid Żebrowski	Poland	8.32	
37	5	8	Namataiki Tevenino	French Polynesia	8.98	SB
	1	8	Mohammed Sad Al-Khfaji	Iraq	DNS	

=== Semifinal ===
The semifinals were started on 4 March at 15:05.

Rank	Heat	Lane	Name	Nationality	Time	Notes
1	2	4	Andrew Pozzi	Great Britain	7.46	Q, SB
2	3	5	Milan Trajkovic	Cyprus	7.51	Q, NR
3	3	4	Pascal Martinot-Lagarde	France	7.52	Q, SB
4	1	3	Aurel Manga	France	7.55	Q
5	2	3	Roger Iribarne	Cuba	7.58	Q, PB
6	1	4	Jarret Eaton	United States	7.58	Q
7	2	6	Aries Merritt	United States	7.60	q
8	2	1	Gabriel Constantino	Brazil	7.61	q
9	3	6	Ronald Levy	Jamaica	7.62	
10	1	5	Balázs Baji	Hungary	7.64	
11	3	3	Petr Svoboda	Czech Republic	7.64	
12	1	6	Ahmad Al-Molad	Saudi Arabia	7.66	
13	2	8	Yidiel Contreras	Spain	7.68	SB
14	2	5	Konstadinos Douvalidis	Greece	7.68	
15	2	2	Abdulaziz Al Mandeel	Kuwait	7.69	SB
16	1	8	Koen Smet	Netherlands	7.69	
17	3	8	Erik Balnuweit	Germany	7.70	
18	1	7	David King	Great Britain	7.70	
19	3	7	Johnathan Cabral	Canada	7.71	
20	3	2	Xie Wenjun	China	7.76	
21	3	1	Damian Czykier	Poland	7.78	
22	1	2	Nicholas Hough	Australia	7.79	
23	1	1	Eddie Lovett	United States Virgin Islands	7.90	
24	2	7	Vitali Parokhonka	Belarus	8.00	

=== Final ===
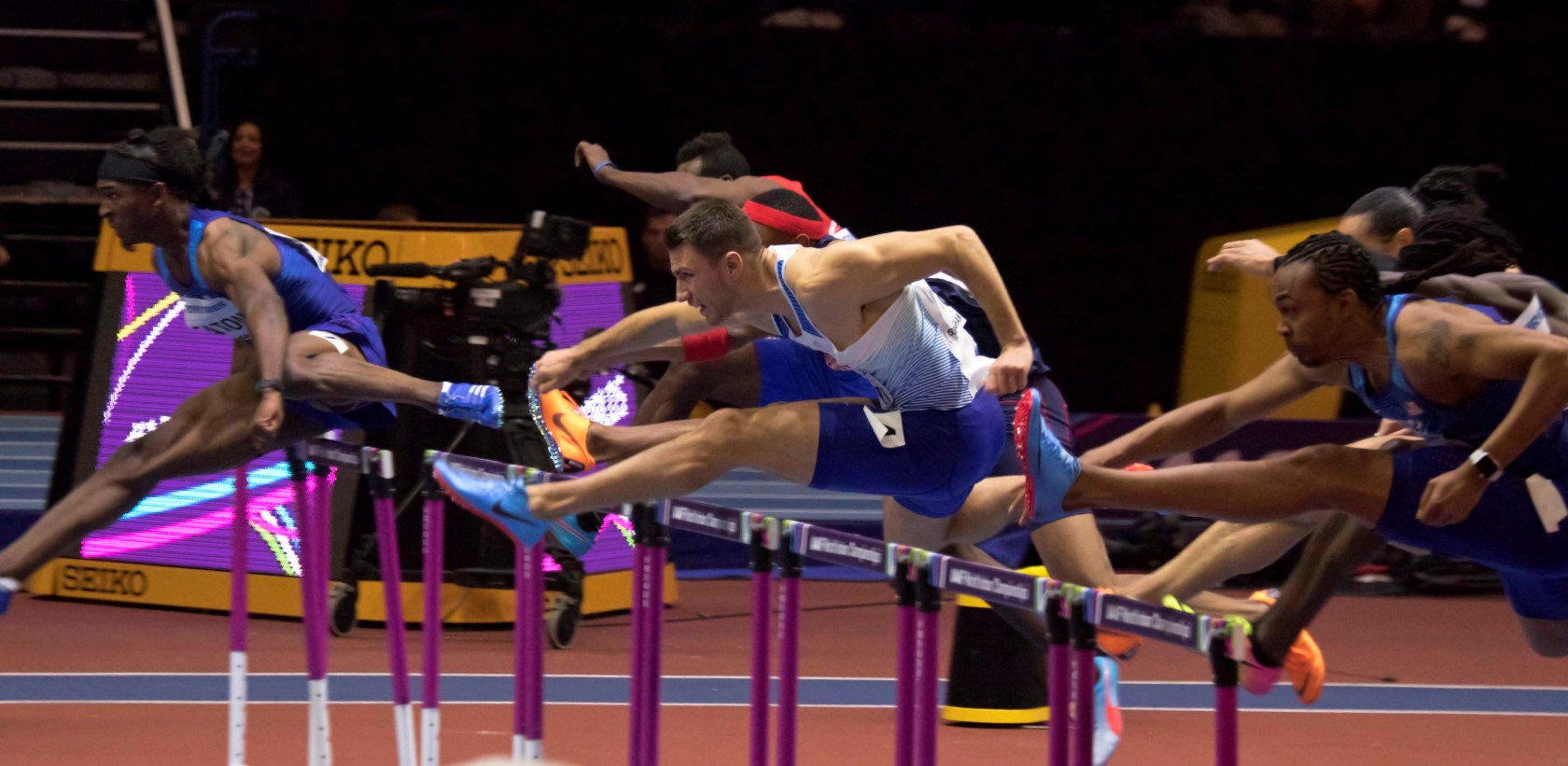
The final

The final was started on March 4 at 17:00.

Rank	Lane	Name	Nationality	Time	Notes
1st place, gold medalist(s)	4	Andrew Pozzi	Great Britain	7.46	SB
2nd place, silver medalist(s)	7	Jarret Eaton	United States	7.47	
3rd place, bronze medalist(s)	5	Aurel Manga	France	7.54	
4	1	Aries Merritt	United States	7.56	
5	3	Pascal Martinot-Lagarde	France	7.68	
6	2	Gabriel Constantino	Brazil	7.71	
7	8	Roger Iribarne	Cuba	7.78	
	6	Milan Trajkovic	Cyprus	DQ	162.8
