= Mikel Thomas =

Trinidad and Tobago hurdler

Mikel Thomas OLY
Personal information
- Full name: Mikel Kevon Thomas
- Born: 23 November 1987 (age 38) Maloney, Trinidad and Tobago
- Height: 1.76 m (5 ft 9 in)
- Weight: 79 kg (174 lb)

Sport
- Country: Trinidad and Tobago
- Sport: Athletics
- Event: Hurdling
- College team: Kentucky Wildcats
Medal record
Pan American Games
Silver medal – second place	2015 Toronto	110 m hurdles
Bronze medal – third place	2015 Toronto	4×100 meters
NACAC Championships in Athletics
Gold medal – first place	2015 San Jose	110 m hurdles
- Updated on 20 December 2014

Mikel Kevon Thomas (born 23 November 1987) is a Trinidad and Tobago hurdler. He competed in the 110 m hurdles event at the 2008, 2012 and 2016 Summer Olympics.

At 2015 Pan-Am Games, he won his first international medal.

Outside of sport, hebecame a firefighter.

== Personal bests ==
=== Outdoor ===
- 100 m: 10.24 s (wind: +1.1 m/s) – Port of Spain, Trinidad and Tobago, 27 June 2015
- 110 m hurdles: 13.17 s (wind: +0.8 m/s) – Toronto, Canada, 24 July 2015
- 400 m hurdles: 51.40 s – Port of Spain, Trinidad and Tobago, 22 June 2008

=== Indoor ===
- 60 m: 6.67 s – Albuquerque, United States, 23 January 2016
- 60 m hurdles: 7.67 s – Lincoln, United States, 6 February 2010

== International competitions ==
Year	Competition	Venue	Position	Event	Notes
Representing Trinidad and Tobago
2007	NACAC Championships	San Salvador, El Salvador	5th (h)^{1}	110m hurdles	14.30 (wind: +1.5 m/s)
2007	Pan American Games	Rio de Janeiro, Brazil	15th	110m hurdles	14.29 (wind: -0.2 m/s)
2007	Pan American Games	Rio de Janeiro, Brazil	19th	400m hurdles	1:05.80
2007	Pan American Games	Rio de Janeiro, Brazil	4th	4 × 100 m relay	39.23
2008	Central American and Caribbean Championships	Cali, Colombia	6th	110m hurdles	13.84 w A (wind: +2.3 m/s)
2008	Olympic Games	Beijing, China	20th (sf)	110m hurdles	13.62 (wind: +0.1 m/s)
2012	Olympic Games	London, United Kingdom	32nd (h)	110m hurdles	13.74 (wind: +1.2 m/s)
2013	World Championships	Moscow, Russia	10th (sf)	110m hurdles	13.46 (wind: -0.6 m/s)
2014	Commonwealth Games	Glasgow, United Kingdom	10th (h)	110m hurdles	13.86 (wind: +0.9 m/s)
2014	Central American and Caribbean Games	Xalapa, Mexico	5th	110m hurdles	13.83 A (wind: +0.7 m/s)
2015	Pan American Games	Toronto, Canada	2nd	110m hurdles	13.17 (wind: 0.8 m/s)
2015	Pan American Games	Toronto, Canada	3rd	4 × 100 m relay	38.69
2015	NACAC Championships	San José, Costa Rica	1st	110m hurdles	13.23 (wind: +1.5 m/s)
2015	NACAC Championships	San José, Costa Rica	5th	4 × 100 m relay	38.90
2015	World Championships	Beijing, China	—	110m hurdles	DQ
2016	World Indoor Championships	Portland, United States	12th (h)	60 m hurdles	7.72
2016	Olympic Games	Rio de Janeiro, Brazil	26th (h)	110 m hurdles	13.68
2017	World Championships	London, United Kingdom	37th (h)	110 m hurdles	13.98
2018	World Indoor Championships	Birmingham, United Kingdom	28th (h)	60 m hurdles	7.84

^{1}: Disqualified in the final.
