= Deuce Carter =

Jamaican hurdler

Personal information
- Born: 28 September 1990 (age 35)
- Height: 1.83 m (6 ft 0 in)
- Weight: 82 kg (181 lb)

Sport
- Sport: Athletics
- Event: 110 metres hurdles

Deuce Carter (born 28 September 1990) is a Jamaican athlete competing in the sprint hurdles. He represented his country at the 2016 Summer Olympics reaching the semifinals.

His personal best in the 110 metres hurdles is 13.20 seconds (+0.2 m/s) set in Kingston in 2016.

== Competition record ==
Year	Competition	Venue	Position	Event	Notes
Representing Jamaica
2009	Pan American Junior Championships	Port of Spain, Trinidad and Tobago	4th	110 m hurdles (99 cm)	13.71
2009	Pan American Junior Championships	Port of Spain, Trinidad and Tobago	3rd	4 × 100 m relay	40.06
2014	Pan American Sports Festival	Mexico City, Mexico	2nd	110 m hurdles	13.51
2015	NACAC Championships	San José, Costa Rica	7th	110 m hurdles	13.66
2016	Olympic Games	Rio de Janeiro, Brazil	20th (sf)	110 m hurdles	13.69
