= Eddie Lovett =

American-born Virgin Islander hurdler

Personal information
- Nationality: American
- Born: June 25, 1992 (age 34) Miami, Florida, U.S.
- Height: 5 ft 11 in (180 cm)
- Weight: 160 lb (73 kg)

Sport
- Sport: Running
- Event: 110 metres hurdles
- College team: Florida

Achievements and titles
- Personal bests: 110H: 13.43 (Russia 2013); 110H (99 cm): 13.14 (Miramar 2011)
Medal record
Men's athletics
Representing the United States
Pan American Junior Championships
Gold medal – first place	2011 Miramar	110 m hurdles
Representing the United States Virgin Islands
Summer Universiade
Gold medal – first place	2013 Kazan	110 m hurdles
- Updated on December 20, 2014

Eddie Lovett (born June 25, 1992) is an American-born U.S. Virgin Islander sprinter who specializes in the 110 metres hurdles. He currently attends the University of Florida. At the time of the 2016 Rio Olympics, in which he represented the U.S. Virgin Islands, he was a volunteer assistant coach at Penn State University.

Lovett won a gold medal in the 110 metres hurdles at the 2011 Pan American Junior Athletics Championships in Miramar, Florida. He set a new championship record with 13.14 sec, a significant improvement to the previous record of 13.45, set in 2005 by Dayron Robles. It is the second fastest time ever by a junior hurdler, behind only Wayne Davis (13.08 sec).

A native of Miami, Florida, Lovett attended Palm Beach Lakes Community High School in West Palm Beach, Florida, where he also was a highly touted football prospect, playing wide receiver and defensive back. However, he broke his arm early into his senior season, effectively ending his football career. He headed to UF on a track scholarship instead.

At the 2010 Florida Class 3A state meet, he ran 13.46 in the 110 m hurdles and broke a state record originally established by Philip Riley (13.59 s) of Orlando-Jones High School in 1990. He was an All-USA high school track and field team selection by USA Today in July 2010. Eddie Lovett is also a member of Phi Beta Sigma fraternity, having joined at Zeta Kappa chapter at the University of Florida.

He won a gold medal in Kazan, Russia, at the 2013 Summer Universiade in a National Record time of 13.43. Eddie is currently managed by World Express Sports Management.

== Personal bests ==
=== Outdoor ===
- 100 m: 10.51 s (wind: +1.3 m/s) – Gainesville, Florida, April 4, 2014
- 110 m hurdles: 13.39 s (wind: +0.6 m/s) – Greensboro, North Carolina, May 25, 2013

=== Indoor ===
- 60 m: 6.77 s – Lincoln, United States, February 1, 2013
- 60 m hurdles: 7.50 s – Fayetteville, United States, March 9, 2013

== International competitions ==
Year	Competition	Venue	Position	Event	Notes
Representing the United States
2011	Pan American Junior Championships	Miramar, United States	1st	110m hurdles (99.0 cm)	13.14 (+1.6 m/s)
2012	NACAC Under-23 Championships	Irapuato, Mexico	4th	110m hurdles	13.58 (+1.8 m/s)
Representing the United States Virgin Islands
2013	Universiade	Kazan, Russia	1st	110m hurdles	13.43 (+1.7 m/s)
2013	Universiade	Kazan, Russia	9th (h)	4 × 100 m relay	40.48
2013	World Championships	Moscow, Russia	17th (h)	110m hurdles	13.52 (+0.5 m/s)
2014	NACAC Under-23 Championships	Kamloops, Canada	1st	110m hurdles	13.39 w (+2.1 m/s)
2014	Pan American Sports Festival	Mexico City, Mexico	3rd	110m hurdles	13.62 A (-0.1 m/s)
2014	Central American and Caribbean Games	Xalapa, Mexico	4th	110m hurdles	13.79 A (+0.7 m/s)
2015	NACAC Championships	San José, Costa Rica	3rd	110m hurdles	13.31 (+1.5 m/s)
2015	World Championships	Beijing, China	27th (h)	110m hurdles	13.65
2016	World Indoor Championships	Portland, United States	7th	60 m hurdles	7.75
2016	Olympic Games	Rio de Janeiro, Brazil	30th (h)	110 m hurdles	13.77
2017	World Championships	London, United Kingdom	18th (sf)	110 m hurdles	13.67
2018	World Indoor Championships	Birmingham, United Kingdom	23rd (sf)	60 m hurdles	7.90
2021	Olympic Games	Tokyo, Japan	37th (h)	110 m hurdles	14.17
2023	Central American and Caribbean Games	San Salvador, El Salvador	6th	110 m hurdles	14.28

Hall of Fame
Year	
2019 Inaugural Class	US Virgin Islands Olympic Hall of Fame

== See also ==
- List of Pennsylvania State University Olympians
- List of University of Florida Olympians
