= Dimitri Bascou =

French track and field athlete

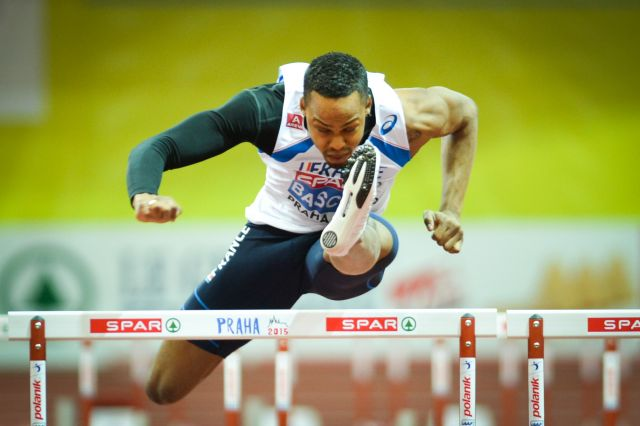
- Bascou at the 2015 European Indoor Championships

Personal information
- Born: 20 July 1987 (age 39) Schœlcher, Martinique, France
- Height: 181 cm (5 ft 11 in)
- Weight: 80 kg (176 lb)

Sport
- Country: France
- Sport: Athletics (track and field)
- Event: 110 m hurdles
- Club: US Créteil
Medal record
Men's athletics
Representing France
Olympic Games
Bronze medal – third place	2016 Rio de Janeiro	110 m hurdles
World Indoor Championships
Bronze medal – third place	2016 Portland	60 m hurdles
European Championships
Gold medal – first place	2016 Amsterdam	110 m hurdles
European Indoor Championships
Silver medal – second place	2015 Prague	60 m hurdles

Dimitri Bascou (born 20 July 1987) is a French track and field athlete who specialises in the 110 metres hurdles. He is known for his explosive and fast starts. He won the gold medal at the 2016 European Championships and the bronze medal at the 2016 Summer Olympics.

== Career ==
He was the silver medallist at the 2009 Mediterranean Games and came fourth at the 2010 European Athletics Championships.

He improved his indoor best in the 60 metres hurdles at the BW-Bank Meeting in February 2011, coming second with time of 7.53 seconds. He broke Ladji Doucouré's long-standing French record in the 60 m hurdles with a run of 7.41 seconds at the 2016 ISTAF Indoor.

== International competitions ==
Year	Competition	Venue	Position	Event	Notes
Representing / Martinique
2005	CARIFTA Games (U-20)	Bacolet, Trinidad and Tobago	4th	110 m hurdles	14.84 (-0.7 m/s)
2005	CARIFTA Games (U-20)	Bacolet, Trinidad and Tobago	2nd	4 × 100 m relay	41.21
2005	CARIFTA Games (U-20)	Bacolet, Trinidad and Tobago	5th	4 × 400 m relay	3:20.60
Representing France
2007	European U23 Championships	Debrecen, Hungary	10th (h)	110m hurdles	14.20 (-2.6 m/s)
2009	Mediterranean Games	Pescara, Italy	2nd	110 m hurdles	13.75
2009	European U23 Championships	Kaunas, Lithuania	4th	110 m hurdles	13.66 (-0.7 m/s)
2009	World Championships	Berlin, Germany	16th (sf)	110 m hurdles	13.49
2010	European Championships	Barcelona, Spain	4th	110 m hurdles	13.41
2011	European Indoor Championship	Paris, France	6th	60 m hurdles	7.64
2011	Universiade	Shenzhen, China	4th	110 m hurdles	13.60
2011	World Championships	Daegu, South Korea	10th (sf)	110 m hurdles	13.62
2012	Olympic Games	London, United Kingdom	19th (sf)	110 m hurdles	13.55
2013	European Indoor Championship	Gothenburg, Sweden	12th (sf)	60 m hurdles	7.72
2013	Mediterranean Games	Mersin, Turkey	4th	110 m hurdles	13.93
2014	European Championships	Zürich, Switzerland	5th (sf)	110 m hurdles	13.33 (Note: Disqualified in the final)
2015	European Indoor Championships	Prague, Czech Republic	2nd	60 m hurdles	7.50
2015	World Championships	Beijing, China	5th	110m hurdles	13.17
2016	World Indoor Championships	Portland, United States	3rd	60 m hurdles	7.48
2016	European Championships	Amsterdam, Netherlands	1st	110 m hurdles	13.25
2016	Olympic Games	Rio de Janeiro, Brazil	3rd	110 m hurdles	13.24
2019	World Championships	Doha, Qatar	10th (sf)	110 m hurdles	13.48
2023	European Indoor Championships	Istanbul, Turkey	9th (h)	60 m hurdles	7.73 (Note: Did not finish in the semifinals)
