= Jarret Eaton =

American track and field athlete (born 1989)

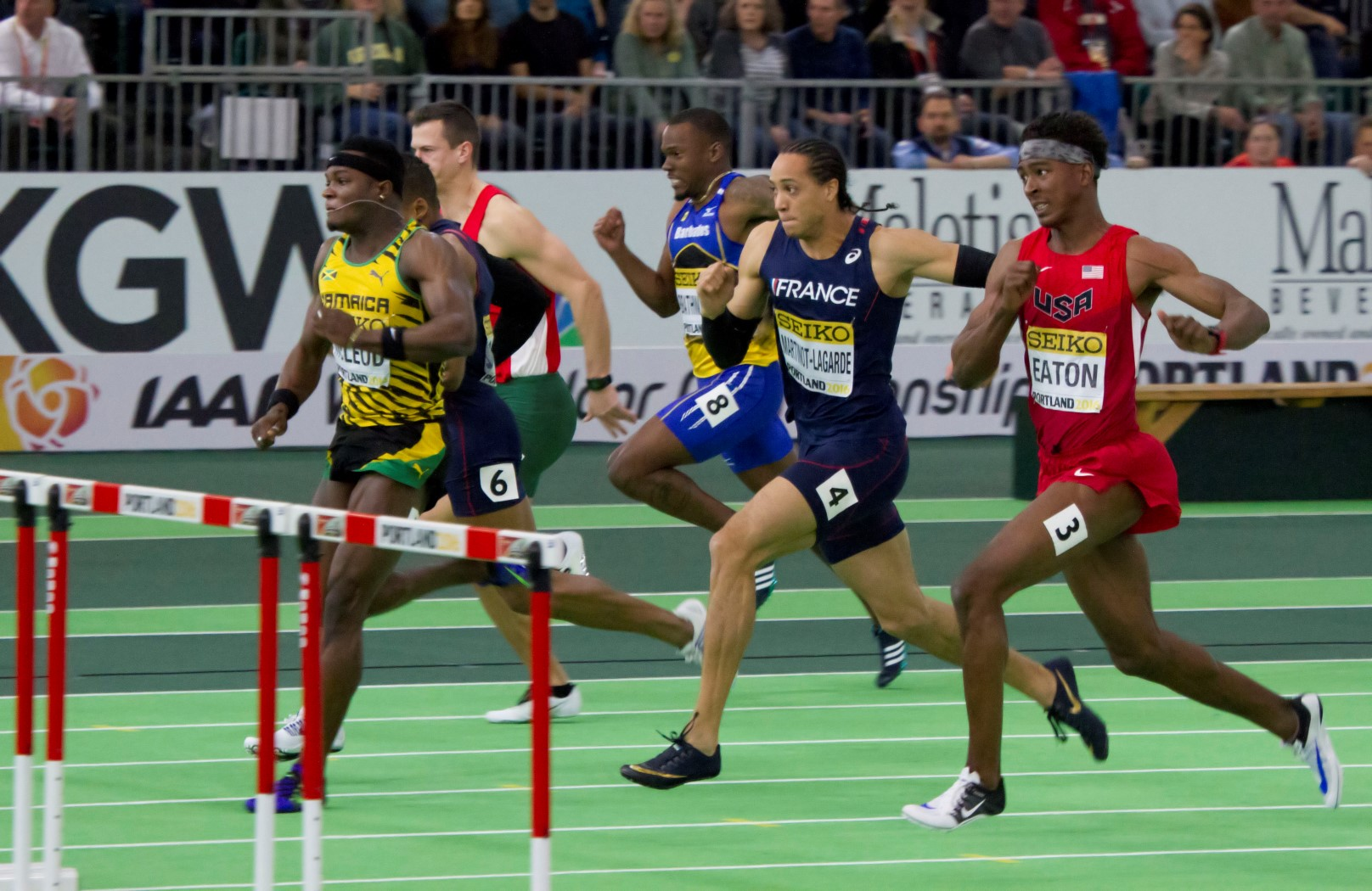
- Eaton (r) in the 2016 World Indoor Championships final

Personal information
- Nationality: American
- Born: June 24, 1989 (age 37)

Sport
- Country: United States
- Sport: Hurdling
- Event(s): 60 metres hurdles 110 metres hurdles
- College team: Syracuse University 2008-2012, West Chester University 2007-2008
- Turned pro: 2012
- Retired: 2022
Medal record
Men's athletics
Representing the United States
World Indoor Championships
Silver medal – second place	2018 Birmingham	60 m hurdles
Bronze medal – third place	2022 Belgrade	60 m hurdles
Pan American Games
Bronze medal – third place	2019 Lima	4×100 m relay

Jarret Eaton (born June 24, 1989) is an American track and field athlete, known for running hurdles. He won the silver medal in the 60 metre hurdles at the 2018 World Indoor Championships and took a bronze in 2022.

Eaton was the 2016 and 2018 American champion in the 60 metre hurdles. That qualified him to run in the 2016 World Indoor Championships in Portland, where he finished fourth. He returned to the 2018 World Championships in Birmingham, taking the silver medal, after leading the race until hitting the final hurdle, behind Britain's Andrew Pozzi and ahead of France's Aurel Manga. While running for Syracuse University, he was the 2012 NCAA Indoor Champion in the same event.

The then 32-year-old returned in 2022 to the World Indoor Championships in Belgrade, and won the bronze medal for the 60m hurdles, behind compatriot Grant Holloway and France's Pascal Martinot-Lagarde.

Jarret has a personal best of 13.25 for 110m hurdles outdoors and for the 60m hurdles indoors his personal best is 7.43 set at the 2018 US Indoor T&F Championships defeating 2012 Olympic Champion and outdoor hurdle world record holder Aries Merritt.

Eaton is represented by sports agent Mark Pryor of World Express Sports Management
