= 2016 IAAF World Indoor Championships – Men's 60 metres hurdles =

Men's 60 metres hurdles at the 2016 IAAF World Indoor Championships
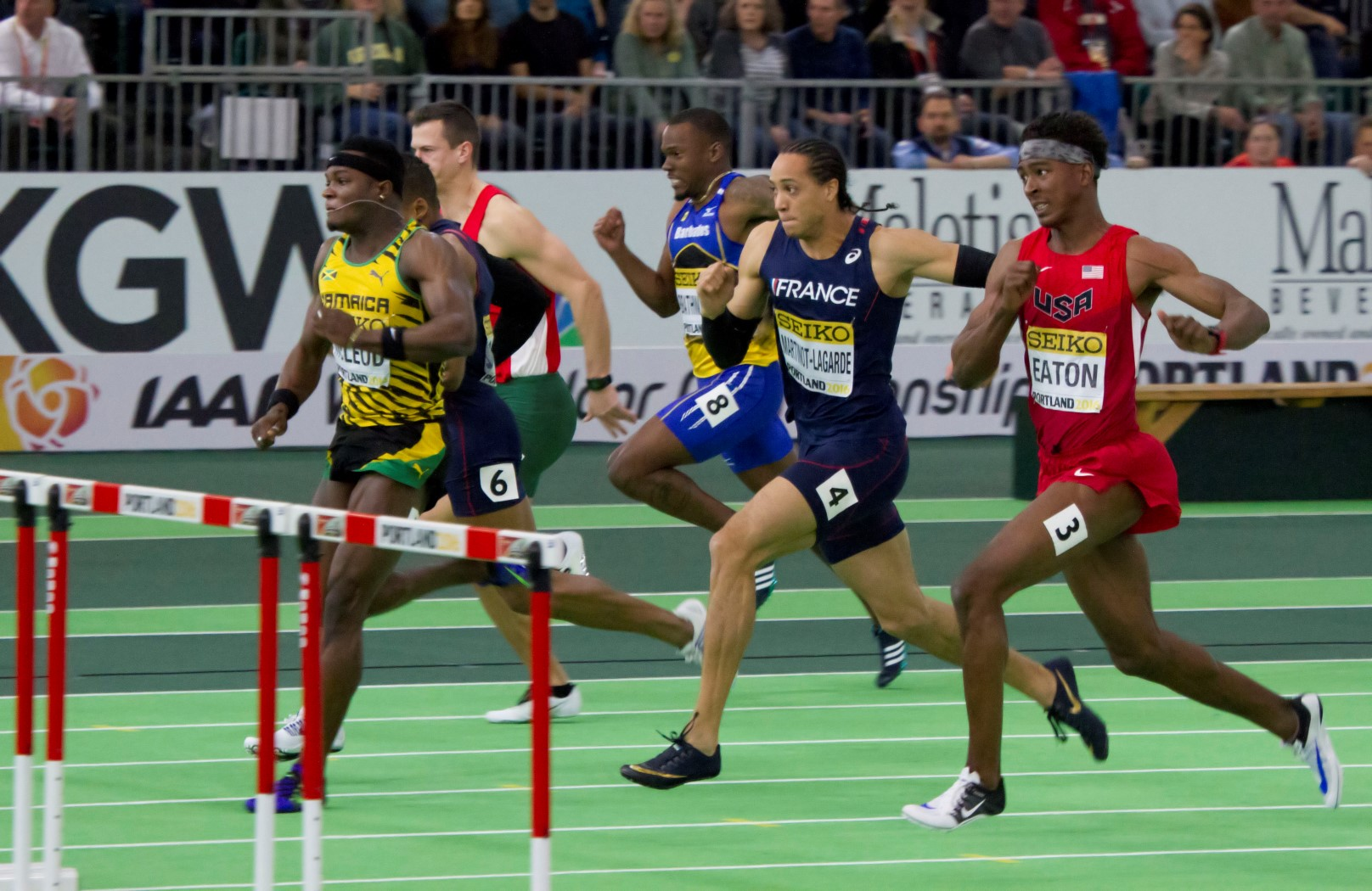
- Venue: Oregon Convention Center
- Dates: March 19 (heats); March 20 (final)
- Competitors: 27 from 21 nations
- Winning time: 7.41

Medalists
gold medal	Omar McLeod	Jamaica
silver medal	Pascal Martinot-Lagarde	France
bronze medal	Dimitri Bascou	France

Video on YouTube Official Video

The men's 60 metres hurdles at the 2016 IAAF World Indoor Championships took place on March 19 and 20, 2016.

In the heats, Pascal Martinot-Lagarde was impressive, running a tenth of a second faster than his nearest rival. Slightly slower in the semi-final, Omar McLeod and Jarret Eaton essentially equalled Martinot-Lagarde.

In the final, McLeod had a fantastic start, gaining half a metre by the first hurdle. He never lost that gap and won standing up. Eaton was also out fast, still dominated by McLeod but ahead of the rest, but the tall Martinot-Lagarde was gaining inches over each hurdle, with his teammate Dimitri Bascou doing very much the same. They were three abreast over the final hurdle but Martinot-Lagarde's momentum put him ahead, diving over the line with Bascou just edging out Eaton, a metre ahead of the next best finishers. For the second World Championships in a row, Martinot-Lagarde led a French 2-3 sweep of the silver and bronze medals.

== Results ==
=== Heats ===
Qualification: First 2 (Q) and next 2 fastest (q) qualified for the semifinals.

Rank	Heat	Name	Nationality	Time	Notes
1	4	Pascal Martinot-Lagarde	France	7.48	Q
2	2	Omar McLeod	Jamaica	7.58	Q
2	3	Dimitri Bascou	France	7.58	Q
4	1	Eddie Lovett	United States Virgin Islands	7.63	Q, SB
5	1	Jarret Eaton	United States	7.66	Q
6	4	Spencer Adams	United States	7.68	Q
7	4	Shane Brathwaite	Barbados	7.68	Q
8	2	Yordan O'Farrill	Cuba	7.69	Q
8	3	Yidiel Contreras	Spain	7.69	Q
10	4	Mikel Thomas	Trinidad and Tobago	7.72	q
11	1	Balázs Baji	Hungary	7.73	Q
12	2	Andreas Martinsen	Denmark	7.74	Q
13	2	Lawrence Clarke	Great Britain	7.74	q
14	3	Xie Wenjun	China	7.74	Q
14	3	Konstadinos Douvalidis	Greece	7.74	Q
16	3	Fábio dos Santos	Brazil	7.76	q
17	1	Antonio Alkana	South Africa	7.76	PB
18	4	Jhoanis Portilla	Cuba	7.77	
19	4	Serhiy Kopanayko	Ukraine	7.77	
20	2	Maksim Lynsha	Belarus	7.77	
21	2	Dominik Bochenek	Poland	7.86	
22	2	Brahian Peña	Switzerland	7.87	
23	1	Martin Vogel	Germany	7.91	
24	1	Artem Shamatryn	Ukraine	7.95	
25	2	João Vitor de Oliveira	Brazil	7.99	
26	3	Moussa Dembele	Senegal	7.99	
27	4	Namataiki Tevenino	French Polynesia	8.84	
	3	Amir Shaker	Iraq	DNS	

=== Semifinals ===
Qualification: First 4 (Q) qualified directly for the final.

Rank	Heat	Name	Nationality	Time	Notes
1	1	Pascal Martinot-Lagarde	France	7.52	Q
2	2	Omar McLeod	Jamaica	7.52	Q
3	1	Jarret Eaton	United States	7.52	Q, SB
4	2	Dimitri Bascou	France	7.63	Q
5	1	Shane Brathwaite	Barbados	7.64	Q, PB
6	2	Balázs Baji	Hungary	7.64	Q
7	2	Spencer Adams	United States	7.65	Q
8	2	Yordan O'Farrill	Cuba	7.67	
9	2	Lawrence Clarke	Great Britain	7.69	
10	1	Eddie Lovett	United States Virgin Islands	7.69	Q
11	1	Yidiel Contreras	Spain	7.71	
12	2	Mikel Thomas	Trinidad and Tobago	7.72	
13	2	Andreas Martinsen	Denmark	7.75	
14	1	Fábio dos Santos	Brazil	7.76	
15	1	Konstadinos Douvalidis	Greece	7.79	
16	1	Xie Wenjun	China	7.90	

=== Final ===
The race was started on March 20 at 14:40.

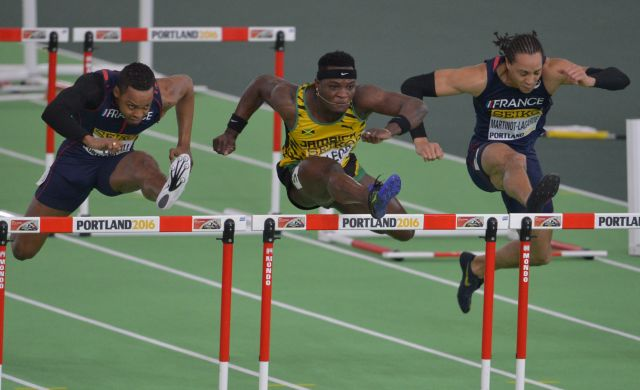
The three medalists during the final

Rank	Lane	Name	Nationality	Time	Notes
1st place, gold medalist(s)	5	Omar McLeod	Jamaica	7.41	WL
2nd place, silver medalist(s)	4	Pascal Martinot-Lagarde	France	7.46	SB
3rd place, bronze medalist(s)	6	Dimitri Bascou	France	7.48	
4	3	Jarret Eaton	United States	7.50	SB
5	1	Spencer Adams	United States	7.64	
6	7	Balázs Baji	Hungary	7.65	
7	2	Eddie Lovett	United States Virgin Islands	7.75	
8	8	Shane Brathwaite	Barbados	7.88	
