= Sergey Shubenkov =

Russian hurdler (born 1990)

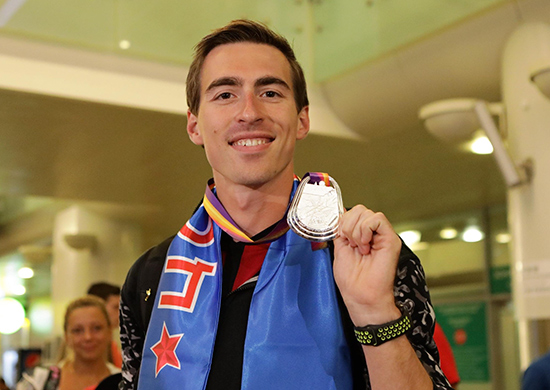
- Sergey Shubenkov at the CSKA Moscow

Personal information
- Full name: Sergey Vladimirovich Shubenkov
- National team: Russia
- Born: 4 October 1990 (age 36) Barnaul, Altai Krai, Russian SFSR, Soviet Union
- Height: 1.90 m (6 ft 3 in)
- Weight: 75 kg (165 lb)

Sport
- Country: Russia; ANA (2017–19); ROC (2021)
- Sport: Athletics
- Event: 110 metres hurdles
- Coached by: Nadezha / Sergey Klevtsov

Achievements and titles
- Personal best: 12.92 (2018)
Medal record
Representing Russia
World Championships
| Gold medal – first place | 2015 Beijing | 110 m hurdles |
| Bronze medal – third place | 2013 Moscow | 110 m hurdles |
European Championships
| Gold medal – first place | 2012 Helsinki | 110 m hurdles |
| Gold medal – first place | 2014 Zurich | 110 m hurdles |
European Indoor Championships
| Gold medal – first place | 2013 Gothenburg | 60 m hurdles |
European U23 Championships
| Gold medal – first place | 2011 Ostrava | 110 m hurdles |
Summer Universiade
| Bronze medal – third place | 2013 Kazan | 110 m hurdles |
European Junior Championships
| Silver medal – second place | 2009 Novi Sad | 110 m hurdles |
Military World Games
| Gold medal – first place | 2015 Mungyeong | 110 m hurdles |
| Gold medal – first place | 2019 Wuhan | 110 m hurdles |
Competed as an Authorised Neutral Athlete
World Championships
| Silver medal – second place | 2017 London | 110 m hurdles |
| Silver medal – second place | 2019 Doha | 110 m hurdles |
European Championships
| Silver medal – second place | 2018 Berlin | 110 m hurdles |
Representing Europe
Continental Cup
| Gold medal – first place | 2018 Ostrava | 110 m hurdles |

Sergey Vladimirovich Shubenkov (Russian: Серге́й Владимирович Шубенков; born 4 October 1990) is a Russian athlete who competes in the 110 metres hurdles. He is the 2015 World Champion, two-time European Champion (2014, 2012) and 2013 World bronze medalist in men's 110 m hurdles.

== Personal life ==
Sergey is the son of Natalya Shubenkova, a former Soviet heptathlete who ranks among the best of all time in the event. Shubenkov decided at the age 16 to make sports his profession and began to train intensively. Alongside his athletic pursuits, he is also studying to obtain a degree in law. He is member of the Russian Armed Forces.

== Biography ==
Shubenkov made a breakthrough by finishing second to Britain's Lawrence Clarke at the 2009 European Athletics Junior Championships in Novi Sad, Serbia. Shubenkov went on to win the European under-23 title in 2011. His first Worlds competition was at the 2011 IAAF World Championships in Athletics in Daegu, South Korea where he finished 25th in the heats and did not advance into the semi-finals.

Shubenkov won his first major European title at the 2012 European Championships in 110 m hurdles. Shubenkov debuted in the Olympics at the 2012 Summer Olympics in London. He did not, however, reach the finals in men's 110 m hurdles.

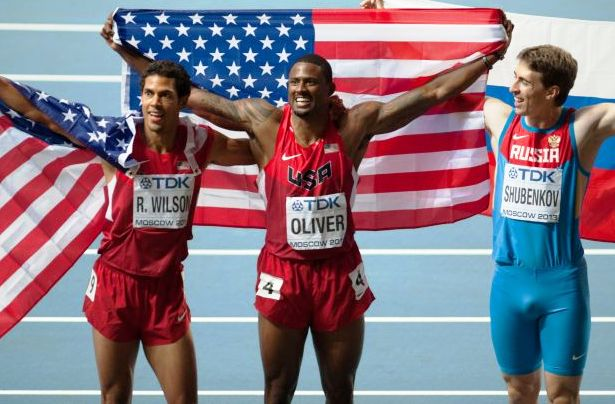
Shubenkov at the 2013 World Championships

In 2013, Shubenkov took the bronze in 110 hurdles at the 2013 Summer Universiade in Kazan and won the gold medal in 60 m hurdles at the 2013 European Indoor Championships in Gothenburg. He won his first Worlds medal by winning a bronze at the 2013 World Championships in Moscow.

In the 2014 season, Shubenkov competed in the Diamond League series. On 18 May, at the Shanghai Golden Grand Prix, he finished in 4th place – 13.30. On 31 May, taking fifth in the Prefontaine Classic – 13.29. On 11 June, took third place in the ExxonMobil Bislett Games – 13.37 and on 3 July, took second place at the Athletissima – 13.13. He repeated as European champion winning gold at the 2014 European Athletics Championships in Zurich.

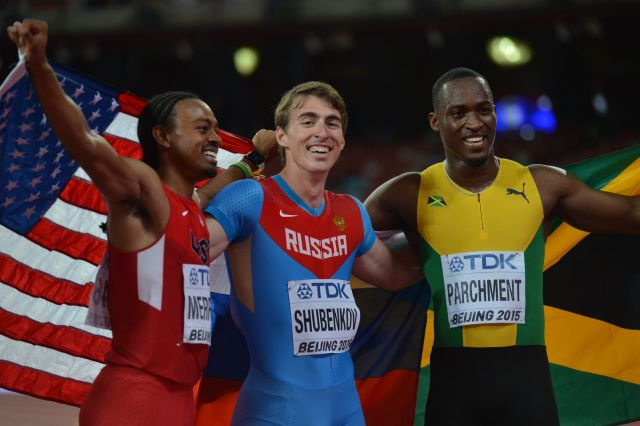
Shubenkov at the 2015 World Championships

In 2015 season, Shubenkov won the gold medal at the 2015 World Championships with a Personal Best of 12.98, he edged out Jamaica's Olympic reigning bronze medalist Hansle Parchment and American Olympic defending champion Aries Merritt who won the silver and bronze medals respectively. His personal best in the event is 12.92 seconds set at Székesfehérvár which is the current Russian record. Commenting about winning the competition, the 24-year-old quoted: "I can't describe what I'm feeling, I don't remember anything about the race. I heard the starting gun and then I opened my eyes and it was finished". Shubenkov finished 3rd in the overall ranking in the men's 110 m hurdles of Diamond League series for the 2015 season and won the last leg of the series in Zurich, beating David Oliver and Orlando Ortega.

In 2021, Shubenkov qualified for the 2020 Summer Olympics held in Tokyo, Japan from July–August 2021. During the warm-ups Shubenkov ruptured an Achilles tendon, forcing him to withdraw from the 110m hurdles event.

== Competition record ==
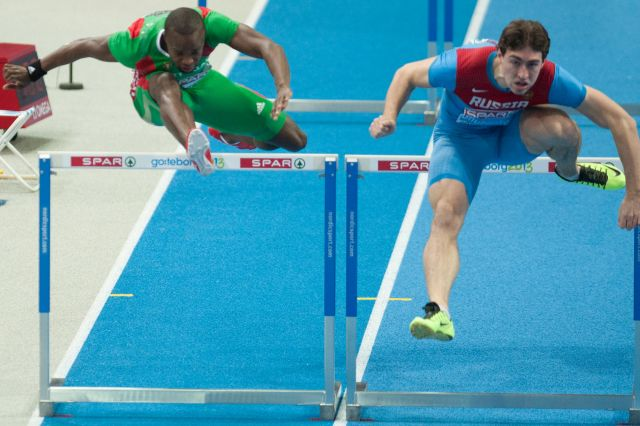
Shubenkov in 2013

| Year | Competition | Venue | Position | Event | Notes |
Representing Russia
| 2009 | European Junior Championships | Novi Sad, Serbia | 2nd | 110 m hurdles (99 cm) | 13.40 |
| 2011 | European U23 Championships | Ostrava, Czech Republic | 1st | 110 m hurdles | 13.56 (wind: -0.4 m/s) |
| 2011 | World Championships | Daegu, South Korea | 25th (h) | 110 m hurdles | 13.70 |
| 2012 | European Championships | Helsinki, Finland | 1st | 110 m hurdles | 13.16 |
| 2012 | Olympic Games | London, United Kingdom | 12th (sf) | 110 m hurdles | 13.41 |
| 2013 | European Indoor Championships | Gothenburg, Sweden | 1st | 60 m hurdles | 7.49 |
| 2013 | Universiade | Kazan, Russia | 3rd | 110 m hurdles | 13.47 |
| 2013 | World Championships | Moscow, Russia | 3rd | 110 m hurdles | 13.24 |
| 2014 | World Indoor Championships | Sopot, Poland | 13th (sf) | 60 m hurdles | 7.66 |
| 2014 | European Championships | Zurich, Switzerland | 1st | 110 m hurdles | 13.19 |
| 2015 | World Championships | Beijing, China | 1st | 110 m hurdles | 12.98 |
| 2015 | Military World Games | Mungyeong, South Korea | 1st | 110 m hurdles | 13.43 |
Competed as an Authorised Neutral Athlete
| 2017 | World Championships | London, United Kingdom | 2nd | 110 m hurdles | 13.14 |
| 2018 | European Championships | Berlin, Germany | 2nd | 110 m hurdles | 13.17 |
| 2019 | World Championships | Doha, Qatar | 2nd | 110 m hurdles | 13.15 |
| 2019 | Military World Games | Wuhan, China | 1st | 110 m hurdles | 13.40 |
Representing (Russia) Russian Olympic Committee
| 2021 | Olympic Games | Tokyo, Japan | DNS | 110 m Hurdles | DNS |

=== Track records ===
As of 12 September 2024, Shubenkov holds the following track records for 110 metres hurdles.

The performance at Kazan highlighted in red text was wind-assisted.

| Location | Time | Windspeed m/s | Date |
|---|---|---|---|
| Braunschweig | 13.20 | +1.0 | 22/06/2014 |
| Bryansk | 13.27 | +0.3 | 02/07/2022 |
| Cheboksary | 13.20 | –0.2 | 21/06/2010 |
| Chelyabinsk | 13.30 | +0.8 | 28/08/2022 |
| Hérouville-Saint-Clair | 13.18 | +0.3 | 31/05/2012 |
| Kazan | 13.10 | +2.2 | 11/07/2013 |
| Marrakesh | 13.23 | +0.1 | 14/09/2014 |
| Montreuil | 12.99 | +0.5 | 19/06/2018 |
| Padua | 13.09 | +1.7 | 02/09/2018 |
| Smolensk | 13.35 | –1.4 | 29/05/2018 |
| Sochi | 13.24 | –0.5 | 26/05/2016 |
| Székesfehérvár | 12.92; NR | +0.6 | 02/07/2018 |
| Zhukovsky | 13.25 | –0.3 | 20/07/2016 |
