= 2015 World Championships in Athletics – Men's 110 metres hurdles =

Men's 110 metres hurdles at the 2015 World Championships
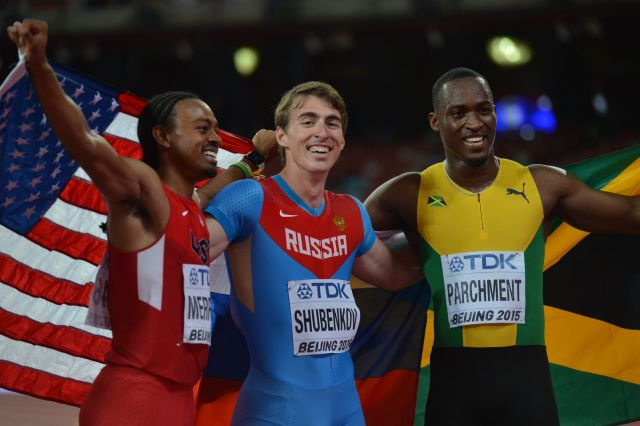
- The medalists L-R: Merritt, Shubenkov, Parchment
- Venue: Beijing National Stadium
- Dates: 26 August (heats); 27 August (semifinals); 28 August (final)
- Competitors: 42 from 27 nations
- Winning time: 12.98

Medalists
| gold medal | Sergey Shubenkov | Russia |
| silver medal | Hansle Parchment | Jamaica |
| bronze medal | Aries Merritt | United States |

The men's 110 metres hurdles at the 2015 World Championships in Athletics was held at the Beijing National Stadium on 26, 27 and 28 August.

== Summary ==
The returning champion was David Oliver, while world leader in 2015 Orlando Ortega is ineligible after switching his nationality to Spain (after defecting to the USA at the 2013 Championships). World record holder Aries Merritt was here, just days before a scheduled kidney transplant.

The heats will be remembered for the false start disqualification of Ronnie Ash. Similar to Jon Drummond's incident in 2003, Ash refused to accept the disqualification and took several minutes before being convinced to leave the track.

In the finals, Oliver was the first to the first hurdle, and he hit it badly. Dimitri Bascou was the next to show a microscopic lead which only lasted until he clobbered the third hurdle, giving world #2 Omar McLeod three steps in the lead until he flipped the fourth hurdle. Merritt and Sergey Shubenkov were the next leaders. Merritt seemed to be running too close to the hurdles and had to slow to compensate giving Shubenkov a slight edge. Hansle Parchment built up speed and even though he hit the tenth hurdle, had more speed to the finish. His late rush passed Merritt to earn silver and make for a challenge to Shubenkov for the gold. Shubenkov's 12.98 was a new Russian National Record.

== Records ==
Prior to the competition, the records were as follows:

| World record | Aries Merritt (USA) | 12.80 | Brussels, Belgium | 7 September 2012 |
| Championship record | Colin Jackson (GBR) | 12.91 | Stuttgart, Germany | 20 August 1993 |
| World Leading | Orlando Ortega (CUB) | 12.94 | Saint-Denis, France | 4 July 2015 |
| African Record | Lehann Fourie (RSA) | 13.24 | Brussels, Belgium | 7 September 2012 |
| Asian Record | Liu Xiang (CHN) | 12.88 | Lausanne, Switzerland | 11 July 2006 |
| North, Central American and Caribbean record | Aries Merritt (USA) | 12.80 | Brussels, Belgium | 7 September 2012 |
| South American Record | Paulo Villar (COL) | 13.27A | Guadalajara, Mexico | 28 October 2011 |
| European Record | Colin Jackson (GBR) | 12.91 | Stuttgart, Germany | 20 August 1993 |
| Oceanian record | Kyle Vander Kuyp (AUS) | 13.29 | Gothenburg, Sweden | 11 August 1995 |

== Qualification standards ==
Entry standards
13.47

== Schedule ==
| Date | Time | Round |
|---|---|---|
| 26 August 2015 | 11:20 | Heats |
| 27 August 2015 | 19:05 | Semifinals |
| 28 August 2015 | 21:20 | Final |

All times are local times (UTC+8)

== Results ==
| KEY: | q | Fastest non-qualifiers | Q | Qualified | NR | National record | PB | Personal best | SB | Seasonal best |

=== Heats ===
Qualification: First 4 in each heat (Q) and the next 4 fastest (q) advanced to the Semifinals. Heats were held on 26 August.

Wind:
Heat 1: -1.3 m/s, Heat 2: +0.2 m/s, Heat 3: -1.0 m/s, Heat 4: -0.7 m/s, Heat 5: -1.2 m/s

| Rank | Heat | Lane | Name | Nationality | Time | Notes |
|---|---|---|---|---|---|---|
| 1 | 3 | 7 | David Oliver | United States | 13.15 | Q |
| 2 | 5 | 7 | Aries Merritt | United States | 13.25 | Q |
| 3 | 1 | 9 | Shane Brathwaite | Barbados | 13.28 | Q |
| 4 | 5 | 4 | Dimitri Bascou | France | 13.29 | Q |
| 5 | 5 | 8 | Sergey Shubenkov | Russia | 13.31 | Q |
| 6 | 4 | 4 | Hansle Parchment | Jamaica | 13.33 | Q |
| 7 | 4 | 8 | Matthias Bühler | Germany | 13.35 | Q, SB |
| 7 | 2 | 5 | Pascal Martinot-Lagarde | France | 13.35 | Q |
| 9 | 4 | 6 | Aleec Harris | United States | 13.41 | Q |
| 9 | 4 | 2 | Greggmar Swift | Barbados | 13.41 | Q |
| 11 | 4 | 3 | Jhoanis Portilla | Cuba | 13.43 | q |
| 11 | 3 | 3 | Garfield Darien | France | 13.43 | Q |
| 11 | 2 | 4 | Andrew Riley | Jamaica | 13.43 | Q |
| 11 | 1 | 4 | Omar McLeod | Jamaica | 13.43 | Q |
| 15 | 1 | 7 | Xie Wenjun | China | 13.44 | Q |
| 15 | 2 | 8 | Gregor Traber | Germany | 13.44 | Q |
| 17 | 3 | 6 | Balázs Baji | Hungary | 13.45 | Q |
| 18 | 5 | 2 | Sekou Kaba | Canada | 13.46 | Q |
| 19 | 1 | 5 | Yidiel Contreras | Spain | 13.48 | Q |
| 20 | 2 | 2 | Artur Noga | Poland | 13.49 | Q |
| 21 | 3 | 4 | Johnathan Cabral | Canada | 13.55 | Q |
| 22 | 3 | 9 | João Vítor de Oliveira | Brazil | 13.57 | q |
| 23 | 3 | 8 | Konstadinos Douvalidis | Greece | 13.58 | q |
| 24 | 5 | 5 | Lawrence Clarke | Great Britain & N.I. | 13.61 | q |
| 25 | 5 | 3 | Antonio Alkana | South Africa | 13.63 | |
| 26 | 3 | 2 | Yordan O'Farrill | Cuba | 13.64 | |
| 27 | 5 | 9 | Eddie Lovett | U.S. Virgin Islands | 13.65 | |
| 28 | 4 | 7 | Nicholas Hough | Australia | 13.69 | |
| 29 | 4 | 9 | Ben Reynolds | Ireland | 13.72 | |
| 30 | 2 | 9 | Ronald Forbes | Cayman Islands | 13.78 | |
| 31 | 2 | 7 | Jonathan Mendes | Brazil | 13.86 | |
| 32 | 4 | 5 | Milan Ristić | Serbia | 13.89 | |
| 33 | 3 | 1 | Bano Traoré | Mali | 13.91 | |
| 34 | 1 | 1 | Éder Antônio Souza | Brazil | 13.96 | |
| 35 | 1 | 2 | Jamras Rittidet | Thailand | 14.00 | |
| 36 | 1 | 6 | Welington Zaza | Liberia | 14.56 | |
| 37 | 3 | 5 | Xaysa Anousone | Laos | 14.74 | |
| | 1 | 3 | Mikel Thomas | Trinidad and Tobago | DQ | R168.7(b) |
| | 1 | 8 | Alexander John | Germany | DQ | R162.7 |
| | 2 | 3 | Ronnie Ash | United States | DQ | R162.7 |
| | 2 | 6 | Petr Svoboda | Czech Republic | DQ | R162.7 |
| | 5 | 6 | Zhang Honglin | China | DNF | |

=== Semifinals ===
Qualification: First 2 in each heat (Q) and the next 2 fastest (q) advanced to the final.

Wind:
Heat 1: 0.0 m/s, Heat 2: -0.2 m/s, Heat 3: -0.1 m/s

| Rank | Heat | Lane | Name | Nationality | Time | Notes |
|---|---|---|---|---|---|---|
| 1 | 2 | 5 | Aries Merritt | United States | 13.08 | Q, SB |
| 2 | 1 | 6 | Sergey Shubenkov | Russia | 13.09 | Q |
| 3 | 2 | 6 | Omar McLeod | Jamaica | 13.14 | Q |
| 4 | 1 | 5 | Hansle Parchment | Jamaica | 13.16 | Q |
| 4 | 3 | 6 | Dimitri Bascou | France | 13.16 | Q, PB |
| 6 | 3 | 4 | David Oliver | United States | 13.17 | Q |
| 6 | 2 | 4 | Pascal Martinot-Lagarde | France | 13.17 | q |
| 8 | 1 | 4 | Garfield Darien | France | 13.25 | q |
| 9 | 1 | 8 | Aleec Harris | United States | 13.29 | |
| 10 | 1 | 7 | Shane Brathwaite | Barbados | 13.31 | |
| 11 | 3 | 5 | Matthias Bühler | Germany | 13.34 | PB |
| 12 | 2 | 2 | Johnathan Cabral | Canada | 13.37 | PB |
| 12 | 2 | 9 | Gregor Traber | Germany | 13.37 | |
| 12 | 3 | 2 | Artur Noga | Poland | 13.37 | SB |
| 15 | 2 | 7 | Xie Wenjun | China | 13.39 | |
| 16 | 3 | 7 | Andrew Riley | Jamaica | 13.43 | |
| 17 | 2 | 8 | Greggmar Swift | Barbados | 13.44 | |
| 18 | 1 | 2 | João Vítor de Oliveira | Brazil | 13.45 | PB |
| 19 | 3 | 9 | Balázs Baji | Hungary | 13.51 | |
| 20 | 3 | 3 | Lawrence Clarke | Great Britain & N.I. | 13.53 | |
| 21 | 3 | 8 | Yidiel Contreras | Spain | 13.57 | |
| 22 | 1 | 9 | Sekou Kaba | Canada | 13.58 | |
| 23 | 1 | 1 | Petr Svoboda | Czech Republic | 13.67 | |
| 24 | 2 | 3 | Konstadinos Douvalidis | Greece | 13.79 | |
| | 1 | 3 | Jhoanis Portilla | Cuba | DNF | |

=== Final ===
The final was held at 21:20.

| Rank | Lane | Name | Nationality | Time | Notes |
|---|---|---|---|---|---|
| 1st place, gold medalist(s) | 7 | Sergey Shubenkov | Russia | 12.98 | NR |
| 2nd place, silver medalist(s) | 8 | Hansle Parchment | Jamaica | 13.03 | SB |
| 3rd place, bronze medalist(s) | 4 | Aries Merritt | United States | 13.04 | SB |
| 4 | 2 | Pascal Martinot-Lagarde | France | 13.17 | |
| 5 | 5 | Dimitri Bascou | France | 13.17 | |
| 6 | 6 | Omar McLeod | Jamaica | 13.18 | |
| 7 | 9 | David Oliver | United States | 13.33 | |
| 8 | 3 | Garfield Darien | France | 13.34 | |
