= Hansle Parchment =

Jamaican hurdler

Hansle Parchment OD
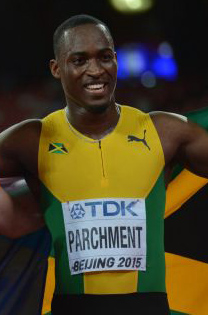
- Parchment at the 2015 World Championships

Personal information
- Born: 17 June 1990 (age 36) St Thomas, Jamaica
- Height: 1.96 m (6 ft 5 in)
- Weight: 90 kg (198 lb)

Sport
- Sport: Athletics
- Event: 110-metre hurdles
- College team: University of the West Indies
- Club: Pelicans Track Club
- Coached by: Fitz Coleman

Achievements and titles
- Personal best: 110 m hurdles 12.93 (Eugene 2023)
Medal record
Men's athletics
Representing Jamaica
Olympic Games
| Gold medal – first place | 2020 Tokyo | 110 m hurdles |
| Bronze medal – third place | 2012 London | 110 m hurdles |
World Championships
| Silver medal – second place | 2015 Beijing | 110 m hurdles |
| Silver medal – second place | 2023 Budapest | 110 m hurdles |
Diamond League
| First place | 2023 Eugene | 110 m hurdles |
| Third place | 2022 Zurich | 110 mh |
| Third place | 2021 Zurich | 110 mh |
Commonwealth Games
| Silver medal – second place | 2018 Gold Coast | 110 m hurdles |
NACAC Championships
| Gold medal – first place | 2018 Toronto | 110 m hurdles |
Summer Universiade
| Gold medal – first place | 2011 Shenzhen | 110 m hurdles |

Hansle Parchment (born 17 June 1990) is a Jamaican track and field athlete, competing in the 110 metres hurdles. He won the gold medal at the 2020 Tokyo Olympics in the event.

Parchment is an alumnus of the University of the West Indies, Kingston and won a gold medal at the 2011 Summer Universiade, running a then-personal best of 13.24 to win the title for Jamaica.

On 8 August 2012, Parchment won the bronze medal at the 2012 Summer Olympics. He ran a then-Jamaican record of 13.12 to clinch third place, behind Aries Merritt and Jason Richardson.

At the 2015 World Championships, Parchment won the silver medal. In a high-quality field consisting of world record holder and Olympic Champion Aries Merritt, defending champion David Oliver, and European champion Sergey Shubenkov, Parchment was beaten only by the Shubenkov, running a time of 13.03.

On 5 August 2021, Parchment won the gold medal at the 2020 Summer Olympics in a time of 13.04, ahead of Grant Holloway and Ronald Levy.

At the 2023 World Championships, he won a silver medal in a time of 13.07s, behind only Grant Holloway. Parchment then avenged this defeat to win the 2023 Diamond League Final in a new personal best of 12.93s.

== Biography ==
Hansle is from St. Thomas, Jamaica where he attended Morant Bay High School.

== Competition record ==
| Year | Competition | Venue | Position | Event | Notes |
Representing Jamaica
| 2010 | Central American and Caribbean Games | Mayagüez, Puerto Rico | 5th | 110 m hurdles | 13.97 |
| 2010 | Commonwealth Games | Delhi, India | 5th | 110 m hurdles | 13.71 |
| 2011 | Central American and Caribbean Championships | Mayagüez, Puerto Rico | — | 110 m hurdles | DQ |
| 2011 | Central American and Caribbean Championships | Mayagüez, Puerto Rico | 1st (h) | 4 × 100 m relay | 39.74 |
| 2011 | Universiade | Shenzhen, China | 1st | 110 m hurdles | 13.24 |
| 2012 | Olympic Games | London, United Kingdom | 3rd | 110 m hurdles | 13.12 |
| 2013 | World Championships | Moscow, Russia | 13th (h) | 110 m hurdles | 13.43 |
| 2015 | World Championships | Beijing, China | 2nd | 110 m hurdles | 13.03 |
| 2017 | World Championships | London, United Kingdom | 8th | 110 m hurdles | 13.37 |
| 2018 | Commonwealth Games | Gold Coast, Australia | 2nd | 110 m hurdles | 13.22 |
| 2018 | NACAC Championships | Toronto, Canada | 1st | 110 m hurdles | 13.28 |
| 2021 | Olympic Games | Tokyo, Japan | 1st | 110 m hurdles | 13.04 |
| 2022 | World Championships | Eugene, United States | 2nd (sf) | 110 m hurdles | 13.02^{1} |
| 2023 | World Championships | Budapest, Hungary | 2nd | 110 m hurdles | 13.07 |
| 2024 | Olympic Games | Paris, France | 8th | 110 m hurdles | 13.39 |

^{1} Did not start in the final due to injury right before the race.

=== Track records ===
As of 12 September 2024, Parchment holds the following track records for 110 metres hurdles.

| Location | Time | Windspeed m/s | Date |
|---|---|---|---|
| Shenzhen | 13.24 | – 0.3 | 20/08/2011 |
| Xiamen | 12.96 | 0.0 | 02/09/2023 |
