= Andrew Pozzi =

British hurdler (born 1992)

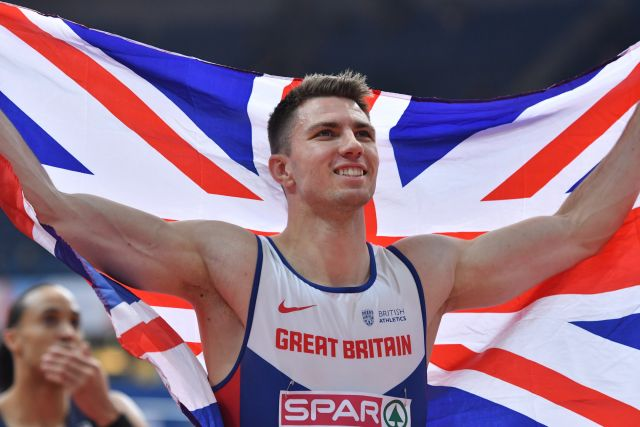
- Pozzi in 2017

Personal information
- Nationality: British (English)
- Born: 15 May 1992 (age 34) Stratford-upon-Avon, England
- Height: 1.91 m (6 ft 3 in)
- Weight: 78 kg (172 lb)

Sport
- Sport: Men's athletics
- Events: 60 metres hurdles 110 metres hurdles
- Club: Stratford-upon-Avon AC
- Coached by: Malcolm Arnold

Achievements and titles
- Personal bests: 100 m Hurdles (U20): 13.29s 60 m Hurdles: 7.43s 100 m: 10.36s 110 m Hurdles: 13.14s
Medal record
Representing Great Britain
World Indoor Championships
Gold medal – first place	2018 Birmingham	60 m hurdles
Commonwealth Games
Bronze medal – third place	2022 Birmingham	110 m hurdles
European Indoor Championships
Gold medal – first place	2017 Belgrade	60 m hurdles
Silver medal – second place	2021 Toruń	60 m hurdles
European Junior Championships
Silver medal – second place	2011 Tallinn	110 m hurdles

Andrew William Pozzi (born 15 May 1992) is a retired British hurdling athlete. His greatest success was indoors; Pozzi was the 2017 European champion and the 2018 World Champion indoors at 60 metres hurdles. He was the 2012 UK 60 m and 110 m Champion and holds the record for the fastest ever 110 metre hurdles time run by a UK junior hurdler. The record time, 13.29 seconds, was set on 3 July 2011 in Mannheim, Germany at the Bauhaus Junior Gala.

Pozzi was coached by Malcolm Arnold, the former coach of Olympic silver medalist and two-time World Championship gold medalist Colin Jackson and 400 m Olympic gold medalist John Akii-Bua.

On 26 November 2011, Pozzi won "Outstanding Athlete of the Year" at the UK Athletics Awards.

Dogged by repeated injuries from as far back as 2012, Pozzi announced his retirement on 4 July 2024.

== Background ==
Pozzi was born in Stratford-upon-Avon, Warwickshire on 15 May 1992. He attended St Gregory's Catholic Primary School in Stratford and later St Benedict's High School in neighbouring town Alcester. He then went on to complete his A-levels at Alcester Grammar School before attending the University of the West of England, Bristol. Since 2018 he has been in a relationship with fellow athlete Katarina Johnson-Thompson. He is of Italian descent.

== Junior career ==
Pozzi begun his career competing for Stratford AC, of which he is still a first-claim member. From 2010-11 he competed as a junior for 'Avon Spa', a joint effort between Stratford AC and Leamington C&AC in the National Junior Athletic League. Pozzi currently holds the record for the fastest ever time run by a UK junior hurdler (13.29s), setting the record at the Bauhaus Junior Gala in Manheim, Germany, on 3 July 2011.

He won a Silver medal at the 2011 European Junior Athletics Championships in Tallinn, Estonia with a time of 13.57s and immediately began focusing on making the transition from junior events to senior competitions.

He ended his junior career on a high, beating his senior rivals in the 110 m hurdles to win the McCain UK Challenge Senior Final with a time of 13.84 – his second fastest wind-legal clocking over the senior hurdles, made all the more impressive given the -1.0 m/s headwind.

== Senior career ==
Pozzi started life as a senior athlete well, winning his first 7 races and clocking a new personal best of 7.62 over 60 m hurdles at the Birmingham Games. He went on to be crowned UK Indoor Champion on 12 February after winning at the Aviva European Indoor Trials & UK Championships in Sheffield, once again equalling his personal best.

On 18 February he competed at the Aviva Grand Prix against Olympic Gold medalist and World Champion Liu Xiang, and World Indoor Champion Dayron Robles. Pozzi performed well, finishing 7th in the final after automatically qualifying by coming 3rd in his heat with a time of 7.62.

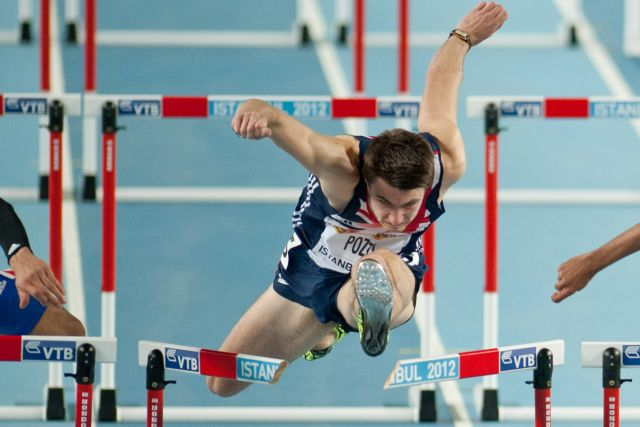
Pozzi at the 2012 IAAF World Indoor Championships

Pozzi was selected to represent Great Britain at the 2012 World Indoor Championships in Istanbul, his first senior International representation. He was the only British male sprint hurdler selected. He surpassed expectations by winning his heat, beating Liu Xiang in the process, with a new personal best of 7.61s which also made him fastest qualifier. Pozzi continued to impress by finishing second in the semi-finals with another personal best of 7.56s making him the second fastest British 19-year-old ever, just 0.01s behind Colin Jackson's record. He finished 4th in the final with a time of 7.58s.

On 7 May 2012, Pozzi won gold at the BUCS championships at the Olympic Stadium, London. In the heats he achieved the Olympic "A" qualifying standard time of 13.52s. It was his first outdoor race of the season. He went on to win in the final with an even better time of 13.35s, making him the fastest European 19-year-old over 110 m hurdles of all time.

=== London 2012 Summer Olympics ===
Pozzi was selected to compete for Team GB after winning the British Olympic Trials on 24 June 2012. Whilst competing at a Diamond League event in Crystal Palace on 13 July 2012 he became injured in the final but was set to recover in time for the Olympic games. By the date of his race on 7 August it was reported that Pozzi was not fully fit but would compete. After clearing the first hurdle it became clear that he had not recovered and immediately clutched his hamstring. He later said "The last month has been a nightmare. I haven’t been able to get my hamstring sorted. Being in the Olympics is all I’ve been waiting and training so hard for. To leave like that is heart‑breaking."

=== Birmingham 2018 World Indoor Athletic Championship ===
Pozzi qualified for finals with a terrific run in both heats and semi-finals. In the finals, he edged Jarret Eaton of the USA by one-hundredth of a second to clinch the gold medal with a time of 7.46 sec.

== Personal bests ==
Event	Best	Location	Date
60 metres hurdles	7.43 s	Birmingham, UK	4 March 2018
100 metres	10.36 s	Florida, USA	20 April 2024
110 metres hurdles	13.14 s	Paris, France	1 July 2017
