= 2018 European Athletics Championships – Men's 110 metres hurdles =

Men's 110 metres hurdles at the 2018 European Athletics Championships
- Venue: Olympic Stadium
- Location: Berlin
- Dates: August 9 (round 1); August 10 (semifinals & final)
- Competitors: 27 from 17 nations
- Winning time: 13.17

Medalists
gold medal	Pascal Martinot-Lagarde; France
silver medal	Sergey Shubenkov; Authorised Neutral Athletes
bronze medal	Orlando Ortega; Spain

The men's 110 metres hurdles at the 2018 European Athletics Championships took place at the Olympic Stadium on 9 and 10 August.

== Records ==
Standing records prior to the 2018 European Athletics Championships
World record	Aries Merritt (USA)	12.80	Brussels, Belgium	7 September 2012
European record	Colin Jackson (GBR)	12.91	Stuttgart, Germany	20 August 1993
Championship record	Colin Jackson (GBR)	13.02	Budapest, Hungary	22 August 1998
World Leading	Sergey Shubenkov (ANA)	12.92	Székesfehérvár, Hungary	2 July 2018
European Leading	Sergey Shubenkov (ANA)	12.92	Székesfehérvár, Hungary	2 July 2018

== Schedule ==
Date	Time	Round
9 August 2018	10:55	Round 1
10 August 2018	19:10	Semifinals
10 August 2018	21:35	Final

All times are local times (UTC+2)

== Results ==
=== Round 1 ===
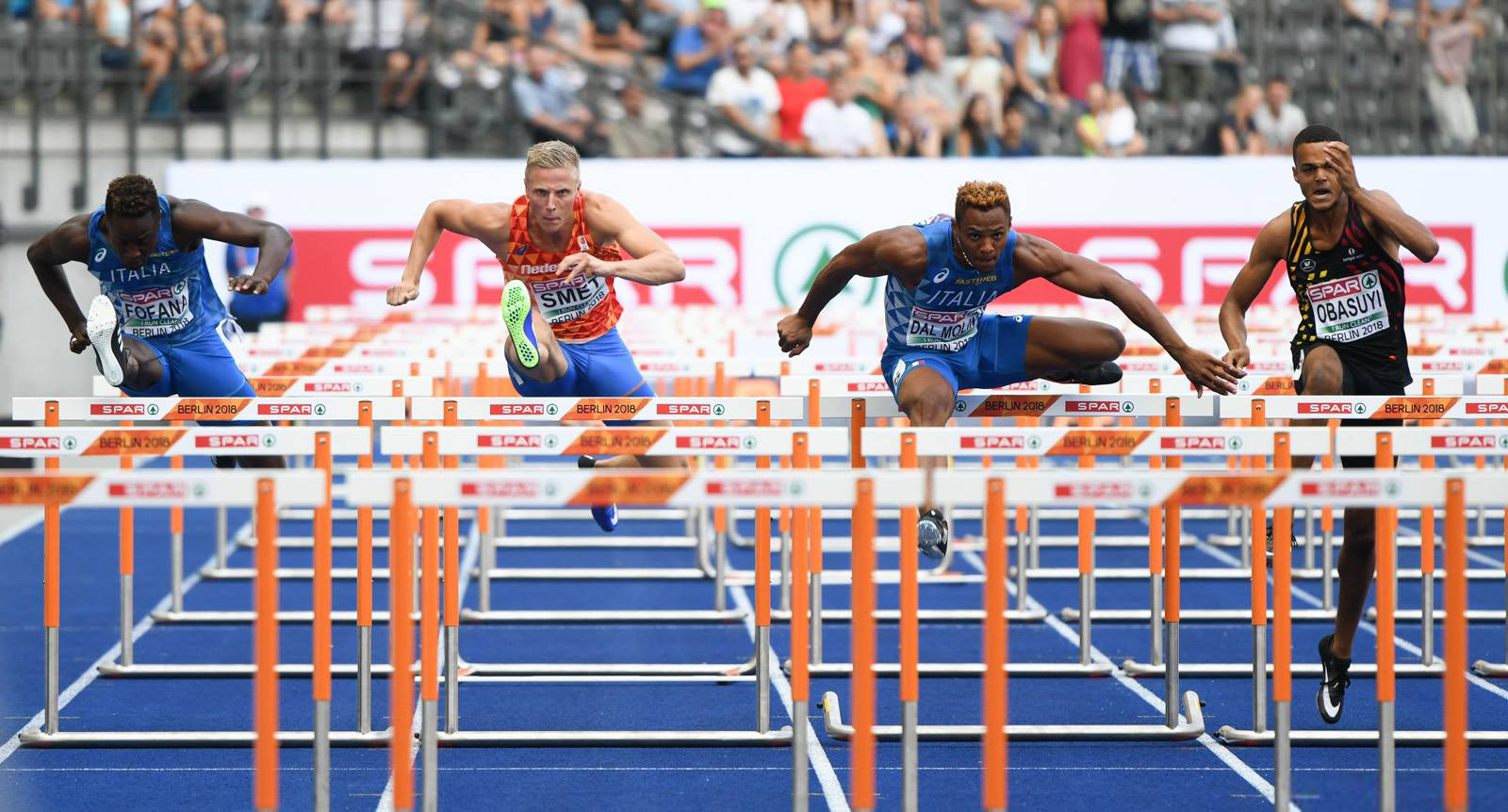
Heat 1

First 4 in each heat (Q) and the next fastest 5 (q) advance to the Semifinals. 11 fastest entrants awarded bye to Semifinals.

Wind:
Heat 1: +1.8 m/s, Heat 2: +1.8 m/s

Rank	Heat	Lane	Name	Nationality	Time	Note
1	1	6	Paolo Dal Molin	Italy	13.40	Q, PB
2	1	8	Hassane Fofana	Italy	13.50	Q, PB
3	2	5	Erik Balnuweit	Germany	13.55	Q
4	1	7	Koen Smet	Netherlands	13.61	Q
5	1	2	Garfield Darien	France	13.62	Q
6	2	3	David King	Great Britain	13.65	Q
7	2	2	Lorenzo Perini	Italy	13.65	Q
8	1	4	Vladimir Vukicevic	Norway	13.67	q
9	2	1	Konstadinos Douvalidis	Greece	13.68	Q
10	1	3	Alexander John	Germany	13.69	q
11	2	8	Artur Noga	Poland	13.71	q
12	2	6	Elmo Lakka	Finland	13.75	q
13	1	5	Michael Obasuyi	Belgium	13.78	q
14	1	1	Artem Shamatryn	Ukraine	14.02	
15	2	7	Bálint Szeles	Hungary	14.07	
16	2	4	Brahian Peña	Switzerland	14.50	

=== Semifinals ===
First 2 (Q) and next 2 fastest (q) qualify for the final.

Wind:
Heat 1: 0.0 m/s, Heat 2: +0.8 m/s, Heat 3: -0.1 m/s

Rank	Heat	Lane	Name	Nationality	Time	Note
1	2	6	Orlando Ortega*	Spain	13.21	Q
2	1	3	Sergey Shubenkov*	Authorised Neutral Athletes	13.24	Q
3	1	4	Gregor Traber*	Germany	13.26	Q, SB
4	2	3	Andrew Pozzi*	Great Britain	13.28	Q, SB
5	3	3	Pascal Martinot-Lagarde*	France	13.32	Q
6	3	6	Balázs Baji*	Hungary	13.41	Q
7	1	5	Aurel Manga*	France	13.45	q
8	3	5	Damian Czykier*	Poland	13.45	q
9	2	7	Garfield Darien	France	13.46	
10	3	7	Lorenzo Perini	Italy	13.50	
11	1	8	Hassane Fofana	Italy	13.52	
12	3	4	Jason Joseph*	Switzerland	13.53	
13	3	2	David King	Great Britain	13.55	SB
14	1	7	Konstadinos Douvalidis	Greece	13.56	
15	2	4	Milan Trajkovic*	Cyprus	13.57	
16	3	8	Erik Balnuweit	Germany	13.59	
17	2	1	Elmo Lakka	Finland	13.60	PB
18	2	2	Paolo Dal Molin	Italy	13.61	
19	1	2	Artur Noga	Poland	13.66	
20	1	6	Vitali Parakhonka*	Belarus	13.69	
21	2	5	Koen Smet	Netherlands	13.71	
22	3	1	Vladimir Vukicevic	Norway	13.71	
23	1	1	Michael Obasuyi	Belgium	13.78	
	2	8	Alexander John	Germany	DQ	168.7

*Athletes who received a bye to the semifinals

=== Final ===
Wind: 0.0 m/s

Rank	Lane	Name	Nationality	Time	Note
1st place, gold medalist(s)	4	Pascal Martinot-Lagarde	France	13.17	SB
2nd place, silver medalist(s)	5	Sergey Shubenkov	Authorised Neutral Athletes	13.17	
3rd place, bronze medalist(s)	3	Orlando Ortega	Spain	13.34	
4	1	Damian Czykier	Poland	13.38	
5	6	Gregor Traber	Germany	13.46	
6	8	Andrew Pozzi	Great Britain	13.48	
7	2	Aurel Manga	France	13.51	
8	7	Balázs Baji	Hungary	13.55	
