= 2014 European Athletics Championships – Men's 110 metres hurdles =

Men's 110 metres hurdles at the European Athletics Championships

The men's 110 metres hurdles at the 2014 European Athletics Championships took place at the Letzigrund on 13 and 14 August.

== Medalists ==
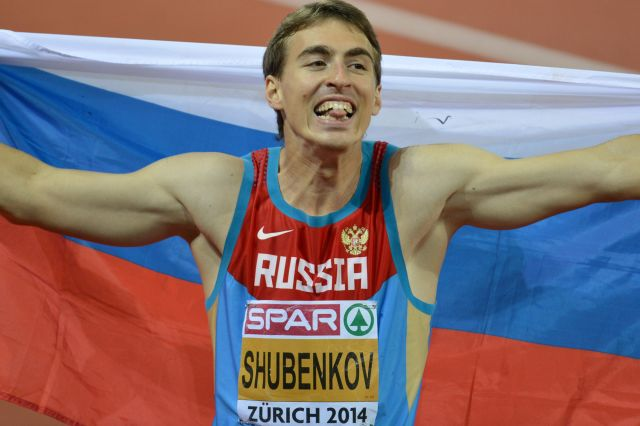
Winner Sergey Shubenkov

Gold	Sergey Shubenkov; Russia
Silver	William Sharman; Great Britain
Bronze	Pascal Martinot-Lagarde; France

== Records ==
Standing records prior to the 2014 European Athletics Championships
World record	Aries Merritt (USA)	12.80	Brussels, Belgium	7 September 2012
European record	Colin Jackson (GBR)	12.91	Stuttgart, Germany	20 August 1993
Championship record	Colin Jackson (GBR)	13.02	Budapest, Hungary	22 August 1998
World Leading	Hansle Parchment (JAM)	12.94	Paris, France	5 July 2014
European Leading	Pascal Martinot-Lagarde (FRA)	12.95	Fontvieille, Monaco	18 July 2014

== Schedule ==
Date	Time	Round
13 August 2014	11:40	Round 1
14 August 2014	19:15	Semifinal
14 August 2014	21:50	Final

All times are local times (UTC+2)

== Results ==
=== Round 1 ===
First 3 in each heat (Q) and 4 best performers (q) advance to the Semifinals.

Rank	Heat	Lane	Name	Nationality	Time	Note
1	1	3	Pascal Martinot-Lagarde	France	13.29	Q
1	3	4	William Sharman	Great Britain	13.29	Q
1	4	8	Sergey Shubenkov	Russia	13.29	Q
4	2	8	Dimitri Bascou	France	13.35	Q
5	3	7	Balázs Baji	Hungary	13.37	Q, SB
6	3	1	Matthias Bühler	Germany	13.40	Q
7	2	1	Gregor Traber	Germany	13.43	Q, PB
8	1	7	Artur Noga	Poland	13.44	Q, SB
9	2	7	Lawrence Clarke	Great Britain	13.46	Q
9	4	1	Thomas Martinot-Lagarde	France	13.46	Q
11	1	5	Erik Balnuweit	Germany	13.48	Q
12	4	5	Petr Svoboda	Czech Republic	13.50	Q, =SB
13	3	8	Konstantin Shabanov	Russia	13.51	q, SB
13	4	7	Andy Turner	Great Britain	13.51	q
15	1	1	Konstadinos Douvalidis	Greece	13.54	q
15	2	6	Paolo Dal Molin	Italy	13.54	q
17	4	2	Hassane Fofana	Italy	13.55	PB
18	1	8	Gregory Sedoc	Netherlands	13.58	
18	2	2	João Carlos Almeida	Portugal	13.58	SB
20	4	4	Dániel Kiss	Hungary	13.64	SB
21	3	3	Dominik Bochenek	Poland	13.66	
22	1	4	Lorenzo Perini	Italy	13.77	
23	2	3	Tobias Furer	Switzerland	13.78	
24	2	5	Milan Trajkovic	Cyprus	13.78	
25	1	6	Arttu Hirvonen	Finland	13.87	PB
26	2	4	Alexander Brorsson	Sweden	13.92	
27	1	2	Vladimir Vukicevic	Norway	13.97	
27	4	6	Andreas Martinsen	Denmark	13.97	
29	3	6	Viliam Papšo	Slovakia	14.19	
30	4	3	Adrien Deghelt	Belgium	14.33	
	3	2	Jussi Kanervo	Finland	DNS	
	3	5	Milan Ristić	Serbia	DNS	

=== Semifinals ===
First 3 in each heat (Q) and 2 best performers (q) advance to the final.

Rank	Heat	Lane	Name	Nationality	Time	Note
1	1	5	William Sharman	Great Britain	13.16	Q, PB
2	1	3	Sergey Shubenkov	Russia	13.16	Q
3	2	5	Pascal Martinot-Lagarde	France	13.17	Q
4	2	4	Balázs Baji	Hungary	13.31	Q, NR
5	2	3	Dimitri Bascou	France	13.33	Q
6	2	8	Petr Svoboda	Czech Republic	13.39	q, SB
7	2	6	Artur Noga	Poland	13.39	q, SB
8	2	7	Matthias Bühler	Germany	13.39	=SB
9	1	7	Lawrence Clarke	Great Britain	13.47	Q
10	1	8	Erik Balnuweit	Germany	13.49	
11	1	6	Thomas Martinot-Lagarde	France	13.50	
12	1	4	Gregor Traber	Germany	13.56	
13	2	1	Konstantin Shabanov	Russia	13.57	
14	2	2	Andy Turner	Great Britain	13.58	
15	1	2	Konstadinos Douvalidis	Greece	13.66	
16	1	1	Paolo Dal Molin	Italy	13.72	

=== Final ===
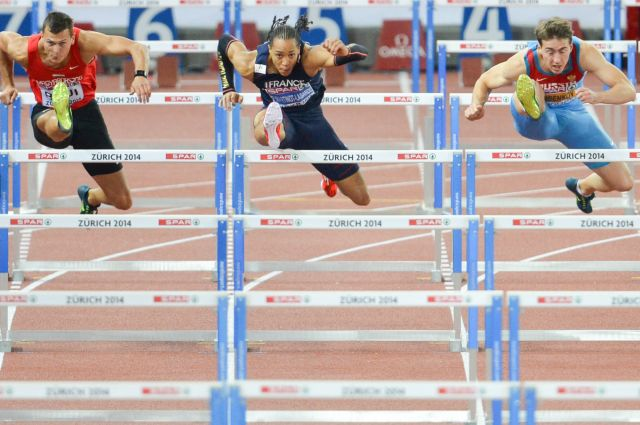
The final

Rank	Lane	Name	Nationality	Time	Note
1st place, gold medalist(s)	4	Sergey Shubenkov	Russia	13.19	
2nd place, silver medalist(s)	3	William Sharman	Great Britain	13.27	
3rd place, bronze medalist(s)	5	Pascal Martinot-Lagarde	France	13.29	
4	6	Balázs Baji	Hungary	13.29	NR
5	2	Petr Svoboda	Czech Republic	13.63	
6	1	Artur Noga	Poland	14.25	
	7	Dimitri Bascou	France	DQ	R163.2
	8	Lawrence Clarke	Great Britain	DNS	
