= Omo Osaghae =

American track and field athlete (born 1988)

Medal record

Men's athletics

Representing United States

World Indoor Championships
Gold medal – first place	2014 Sopot	60 m hurdles

Omoghan "Omo" Osaghae (born May 18, 1988) is an American track and field athlete who competes in the sprint hurdles. He is coached by Texas Tech hurdles coach, Dion Miller. He has personal records of 7.45 seconds for the 60-meter hurdles and 13.23 seconds for the 110-meter hurdles.

He is a three-time winner of the 60-meter hurdles at the USA Indoor Track and Field Championships and the 2014 World Indoor Champion. He competed collegiately for the Texas Tech Red Raiders and won three Big 12 Conference titles (2009 and 2011 outdoors, 2009 indoors).

== Career ==
=== Early life and college ===
Born in Lubbock, Texas to Moses and Esther Osaghae, Omo Osaghae grew up in a sporting family. His father played soccer in his native Nigeria while his brother, Tim, went on to play college football with Texas Tech University. He first began to get involved in sports at Monterey High School, where he competed in track and football for the school. Coached by Roy Phelps, Omo competed in the 110 m hurdles for the Texas high school state championship his junior and senior years of high school. He gained entry to study a major in accounting at Texas Tech University, which was also the alma mater of his father.

He swiftly began to make an impact in the hurdles with the Texas Tech Red Raiders team – in his first season he set an indoor best of 7.91 seconds for the 60-meter hurdles to come third at the Big 12 Conference indoor championship then placed fourth in the 110 m hurdles at the Big 12 outdoor meet with another best of 13.99 seconds. The following year he was only seventh at the Big 12 indoors, but performed much better outdoors: he came third at the Big 12 meet with a personal record of 13.86 seconds then improved to 13.65 seconds to make the final at the NCAA Men's Outdoor Track and Field Championship, where he came seventh.

Osaghae edged towards the top of the college scene at the start of 2008. He won the Big 12 indoor title and was runner-up at the NCAA Men's Indoor Track and Field Championship with a 60 m hurdles best of 7.64 seconds, one hundredth behind the winner Ronnie Ash. Outdoors he improved to 13.51 seconds and won the Big 12 110 m hurdles title. He also reached the final of the 200-meter dash at that meet. A false-start ruled him out of the NCAA Outdoors and instead he competed at the 2009 USA Outdoor Track and Field Championships, reaching the semi-finals. In 2011 he competed indoors only, redshirting the outdoor season. He came runner-up at the Big 12 indoors and third at the NCAA Indoor Championship.

He did not compete collegiately in the 2011 indoor season, but instead made his debut at the USA Indoor Track and Field Championships and won his first national title in the 60 m hurdles, defeating Kevin Craddock and Jason Richardson. In his last collegiate competitions he won at the Mt. SAC Relays and set a best of 13.35 seconds to win at the Penn Relays. A personal best of 13.23 seconds to win at the Big 12 championships saw him ranked tenth in the world that year. However, he hit a hurdle in the NCAA Outdoor Championship final and ended up seventh. At the 2011 USA Outdoor Track and Field Championships he failed to make the final. Having finished college, he competed in Europe for the first time towards the end of the year. In his first professional year he was runner-up at the Mt. SAC Relays and Drake Relays, setting a season's best of 13.24 seconds. Nationally, he finished just off the 60 m hurdles podium in fourth place and was eliminated in the semi-finals at the 2012 United States Olympic Trials.

=== Professional career ===
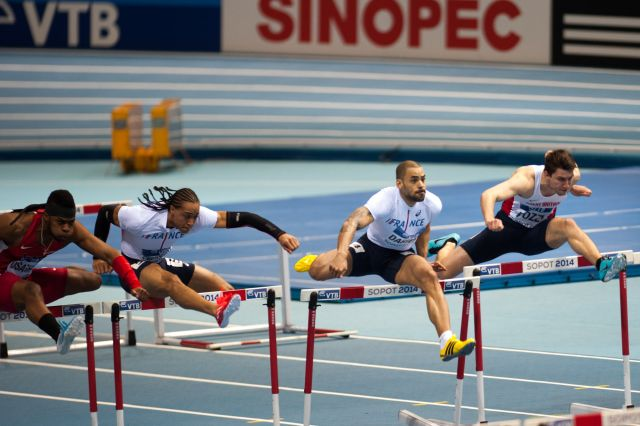
60 m hurdles final at the 2014 IAAF World Indoor Championships in Sopot. Omo Osaghae, Pascal Martinot-Lagarde, Garfield Darien and Andrew Pozzi

Osaghae performed well in the 60 m hurdles in the 2013 indoor season. Competing in Europe, he was second at both the Weltklasse in Karlsruhe and PSD Bank Meeting before setting a new personal record of 7.51 seconds to win at the Birmingham Indoor Grand Prix. This culminated in his second national title win at the USA Indoor Championships. Outdoors he frequently participated in 2013 IAAF Diamond League meetings but never made the top three. He did, however, win at the Golden Grand Prix in Tokyo and the Memorial Primo Nebiolo in Turin. He placed sixth at the 2013 USA Outdoor Track and Field Championships and ended the year with a season's best of 13.35 seconds for the 110 m hurdles.

His third national title in the 60 m hurdles came in 2014. In a close finish, where he, Terrence Trammell, and Dominic Berger all recorded the same time of 7.56 seconds, Osaghae was awarded the championship after examination of the photo finish.

== Personal records ==
- 50-meter hurdles – 6.52 sec (2012)
- 55-meter hurdles – 7.05 sec (2014)
- 60-meter hurdles – 7.45 sec (2014)
- 110-meter hurdles – 13.23 sec (2011)
- 60-meter dash – 6.90 sec (2014)
- 100-meter dash – 10.63 sec (2013)
- 200-meter dash – 21.13 sec (2009)
