= Athletics at the 2003 Pan American Games – Men's 110 metres hurdles =

Men's 110 metres hurdles at the Pan American Games

The men's 110 metres hurdles event at the 2003 Pan American Games was held on August 8–9.

== Medalists ==
Gold	Silver	Bronze
Yuniel Hernández; Cuba	Larry Wade; United States	Márcio de Souza; Brazil

== Results ==
=== Heats ===
Qualification: First 2 of each heat (Q) and the next 2 fastest (q) qualified for the final.

Wind:
Heat 1: +0.9 m/s, Heat 2: +0.7 m/s, Heat 3: +1.8 m/s

Rank	Heat	Name	Nationality	Time	Notes
1	2	Larry Wade	United States	13.35	Q
2	2	Yuniel Hernández	Cuba	13.39	Q
3	1	Joshua Walker	United States	13.54	Q
3	1	Redelén dos Santos	Brazil	13.54	Q
3	2	Dudley Dorival	Haiti	13.54	q
6	2	Charles Allen	Canada	13.58	q
7	3	Márcio de Souza	Brazil	13.67	Q
8	3	Jackson Quiñónez	Ecuador	13.70	Q
9	1	Dominique Degrammont	Haiti	13.78	
10	3	Karl Jennings	Canada	13.80	
11	1	Paulo Villar	Colombia	13.81	
11	3	Chris Pinnock	Jamaica	13.81	
13	1	Anier García	Cuba	13.83	
14	1	Ricardo Melbourne	Jamaica	13.90	
15	2	Hugh Henry	Barbados	14.01	
16	3	Alleyne Lett	Grenada	14.10	

=== Final ===
Wind: -0.2 m/s

Rank	Name	Nationality	Time	Notes
1st place, gold medalist(s)	Yuniel Hernández	Cuba	13.35	
2nd place, silver medalist(s)	Larry Wade	United States	13.35	
3rd place, bronze medalist(s)	Márcio de Souza	Brazil	13.45	
4	Redelén dos Santos	Brazil	13.48	
5	Dudley Dorival	Haiti	13.48	
6	Jackson Quiñónez	Ecuador	13.64	
7	Charles Allen	Canada	13.66	
8	Joshua Walker	United States	13.75	
