= 2011 European Athletics U23 Championships – Men's 110 metres hurdles =

European athletics competition

The Men's 110 metres hurdles event at the 2011 European Athletics U23 Championships was held in Ostrava, Czech Republic, at Městský stadion on 15 and 16 July.

== Medalists ==
Gold	Sergey Shubenkov; Russia
Silver	Balázs Baji; Hungary
Bronze	Lawrence Clarke; United Kingdom

== Results ==
=== Final ===
16 July 2011 / 18:50
Wind: -0.4 m/s

Rank	Name	Nationality	Lane	Reaction Time	Time	Notes
1st place, gold medalist(s)	Sergey Shubenkov	Russia	5	0.166	13.56	
2nd place, silver medalist(s)	Balázs Baji	Hungary	6	0.156	13.58	PB
3rd place, bronze medalist(s)	Lawrence Clarke	United Kingdom	4	0.167	13.62	
4	Thomas Delmestre	France	7	0.171	13.62	PB
5	Aleksey Dryomin	Russia	3	0.152	13.74	
6	Martin Mazáč	Czech Republic	2	0.155	13.81	
7	Vladimir Vukicevic	Norway	1	0.141	13.90	
8	Julian Marquart	Germany	8	0.127	13.91	

=== Semifinals ===
Qualified: First 3 in each heat (Q) and 2 best performers (q) advance to the Final

==== Summary ====
Rank	Name	Nationality	Time	Notes
1	Sergey Shubenkov	Russia	13.64	Q
2	Lawrence Clarke	United Kingdom	13.65	Q
3	Balázs Baji	Hungary	13.68	Q PB
4	Aleksey Dryomin	Russia	13.72	Q
5	Thomas Delmestre	France	13.84	Q PB
6	Martin Mazáč	Czech Republic	13.87	q
7	Julian Marquart	Germany	13.88	Q PB
8	Vladimir Vukicevic	Norway	13.89	q PB
9	Rasul Dabó	Portugal	13.90	
10	Konstantin Shabanov	Russia	13.94	
11	Michele Calvi	Italy	14.03	
12	Viliam Papšo	Slovakia	14.05	
13	Andreas Martinsen	Denmark	14.10	SB
14	Francisco Javier López	Spain	14.31	
15	Joona-Ville Heinä	Finland	14.44	
	Petr Peňáz	Czech Republic	DNF	

==== Details ====
===== Semifinal 1 =====
16 July 2011 / 17:30 Wind: -0.8 m/s

Rank	Name	Nationality	Lane	Reaction Time	Time	Notes
1	Sergey Shubenkov	Russia	4	0.181	13.64	Q
2	Lawrence Clarke	United Kingdom	5	0.164	13.65	Q
3	Thomas Delmestre	France	6	0.175	13.84	Q PB
4	Martin Mazáč	Czech Republic	8	0.175	13.87	q
5	Michele Calvi	Italy	3	0.160	14.03	
6	Viliam Papšo	Slovakia	2	0.160	14.05	
7	Andreas Martinsen	Denmark	1	0.176	14.10	SB
8	Joona-Ville Heinä	Finland	7	0.163	14.44	

===== Semifinal 2 =====
16 July 2011 / 17:37 Wind: -0.9 m/s

Rank	Name	Nationality	Lane	Reaction Time	Time	Notes
1	Balázs Baji	Hungary	6	0.161	13.68	Q PB
2	Aleksey Dryomin	Russia	3	0.163	13.72	Q
3	Julian Marquart	Germany	7	0.151	13.88	Q PB
4	Vladimir Vukicevic	Norway	1	0.146	13.89	q PB
5	Rasul Dabó	Portugal	4	0.150	13.90	
6	Konstantin Shabanov	Russia	5	0.167	13.94	
7	Francisco Javier López	Spain	8	0.214	14.31	
	Petr Peňáz	Czech Republic	2	0.181	DNF	

=== Heats ===
Qualified: First 3 in each heat (Q) and 4 best performers (q) advance to the Semifinals

==== Summary ====
Rank	Name	Nationality	Time	Notes
1	Lawrence Clarke	United Kingdom	13.73	Q
1	Aleksey Dryomin	Russia	13.73	Q
3	Balázs Baji	Hungary	13.87	Q
3	Thomas Delmestre	France	13.87	Q PB
5	Konstantin Shabanov	Russia	13.96	Q
5	Sergey Shubenkov	Russia	13.96	Q
7	Rasul Dabó	Portugal	13.98	Q
7	Martin Mazáč	Czech Republic	13.98	Q
9	Julian Marquart	Germany	14.00	Q
10	Andreas Martinsen	Denmark	14.08	q SB
11	Michele Calvi	Italy	14.13	Q
11	Francisco Javier López	Spain	14.13	Q SB
11	Viliam Papšo	Slovakia	14.13	q
14	Vladimir Vukicevic	Norway	14.16	q
15	Petr Peňáz	Czech Republic	14.26	q
16	Martin Arnaudov	Bulgaria	14.29	
16	Joona-Ville Heinä	Finland	14.29	Q
18	Jordan Nicolas	France	14.31	
19	Milan Ristić	Serbia	14.33	
20	Pascal Martinot-Lagarde	France	14.33	
21	Ernesto Prados	Spain	14.45	
22	Tomáš Kavka	Czech Republic	14.49	
23	Sorin Drăghici	Romania	14.62	
24	Kārlis Daube	Latvia	14.65	
25	Jaakko Malmivirta	Finland	14.75	
26	Julián Ortiz	Spain	15.30	

==== Details ====
===== Heat 1 =====
15 July 2011 / 10:45 Wind: -0.3 m/s

Rank	Name	Nationality	Lane	Reaction Time	Time	Notes
1	Lawrence Clarke	United Kingdom	6	0.153	13.73	Q
2	Thomas Delmestre	France	3	0.186	13.87	Q PB
3	Martin Mazáč	Czech Republic	4	0.167	13.98	Q
4	Andreas Martinsen	Denmark	2	0.185	14.08	q SB
5	Viliam Papšo	Slovakia	5	0.181	14.13	q
6	Kārlis Daube	Latvia	7	0.180	14.65	

===== Heat 2 =====
15 July 2011 / 10:52 Wind: -0.6 m/s

Rank	Name	Nationality	Lane	Reaction Time	Time	Notes
1	Konstantin Shabanov	Russia	3	0.164	13.96	Q
2	Rasul Dabó	Portugal	4	0.161	13.98	Q
3	Joona-Ville Heinä	Finland	5	0.166	14.29	Q
4	Milan Ristić	Serbia	8	0.152	14.33	
5	Pascal Martinot-Lagarde	France	7	0.195	14.33	
6	Ernesto Prados	Spain	6	0.154	14.45	
7	Sorin Drăghici	Romania	2	0.193	14.62	

===== Heat 3 =====
15 July 2011 / 10:59 Wind: -0.9 m/s

Rank	Name	Nationality	Lane	Reaction Time	Time	Notes
1	Aleksey Dryomin	Russia	6	0.161	13.73	Q
2	Balázs Baji	Hungary	5	0.197	13.87	Q
3	Julian Marquart	Germany	4	0.160	14.00	Q
4	Petr Peňáz	Czech Republic	7	0.206	14.26	q
5	Jordan Nicolas	France	3	0.163	14.31	
6	Julián Ortiz	Spain	2	0.165	15.30	

===== Heat 4 =====
15 July 2011 / 11:06 Wind: -1.4 m/s

Rank	Name	Nationality	Lane	Reaction Time	Time	Notes
1	Sergey Shubenkov	Russia	4	0.186	13.96	Q
2	Michele Calvi	Italy	3	0.177	14.13	Q
3	Francisco Javier López	Spain	2	0.222	14.13	Q SB
4	Vladimir Vukicevic	Norway	6	0.151	14.16	q
5	Martin Arnaudov	Bulgaria	7	0.175	14.29	
6	Tomáš Kavka	Czech Republic	5	0.171	14.49	
7	Jaakko Malmivirta	Finland	8	0.223	14.75	

== Participation ==
According to an unofficial count, 26 athletes from 17 countries participated in the event.

- Bulgaria (1)
- Czech Republic (3)
- Denmark (1)
- Finland (2)
- France (3)
- Germany (1)
- Hungary (1)
- Italy (1)
- Latvia (1)
- Norway (1)
- Portugal (1)
- Romania (1)
- Russia (3)
- Serbia (1)
- Slovakia (1)
- Spain (3)
- United Kingdom (1)
