= 2012 European Athletics Championships – Men's 110 metres hurdles =

Men's 110 metres hurdles at the European Athletics Championships

The men's 110 metres hurdles at the 2012 European Athletics Championships was held at the Helsinki Olympic Stadium on 30 June and 1 July.

== Medalists ==
Gold	Sergey Shubenkov; Russia
Silver	Garfield Darien; France
Bronze	Artur Noga; Poland

== Records ==
Standing records prior to the 2012 European Athletics Championships
World record	Dayron Robles (CUB)	12.87	Ostrava, Czech Republic	12 June 2008
European record	Colin Jackson (GBR)	12.91	Stuttgart, Germany	20 August 1993
Championship record	Colin Jackson (GBR)	13.02	Budapest, Hungary	22 August 1998
World Leading	Liu Xiang (CHN)	12.97	Shanghai, China	19 May 2012
European Leading	Sergey Shubenkov (RUS)	13.18	Hérouville, France	31 May 2012
Broken records during the 2012 European Athletics Championships
European Leading	Sergey Shubenkov (RUS)	13.09	Helsinki, Finland	1 July 2012

== Schedule ==
Date	Time	Round
30 June 2012	14:45	Round 1
1 July 2012	16:35	Semifinals
1 July 2012	19:10	Final

== Results ==
=== Round 1 ===
First 4 in each heat (Q) and 4 best performers (q) advance to the Semifinals.

Wind:
Heat 1: -1.2 m/s, Heat 2: +0.5 m/s, Heat 3: -0.7 m/s, Heat 4: -2.0 m/s, Heat 5: +1.1 m/s

Rank	Heat	Lane	Name	Nationality	Time	Note
1	5	7	Sergey Shubenkov	Russia	13.28	Q
2	4	6	Garfield Darien	France	13.46	Q
3	2	4	Artur Noga	Poland	13.49	Q
4	2	3	Alexander John	Germany	13.50	Q
4	5	4	Balázs Baji	Hungary	13.50	Q, PB
6	1	5	Philip Nossmy	Sweden	13.56	Q, =SB
7	3	1	Konstadinos Douvalidis	Greece	13.57	Q
8	3	7	Gregory Sedoc	Netherlands	13.59	Q
9	3	2	Emanuele Abate	Italy	13.61	Q
10	3	6	Dániel Kiss	Hungary	13.62	Q
11	4	4	William Sharman	Great Britain	13.63	Q
11	2	7	João Almeida	Portugal	13.63	Q, PB
13	2	5	Vladimir Vukicevic	Norway	13.65	Q, NUR
14	3	5	Adrien Deghelt	Belgium	13.66	q
15	4	7	Paolo dal Molin	Italy	13.68	Q
16	3	4	Gianni Frankis	Great Britain	13.71	q
17	5	3	Samuel Coco-Viloin	France	13.72	Q
18	2	6	Maksim Lynsha	Belarus	13.75	q
19	4	1	Gregor Traber	Germany	13.83	Q
20	2	2	David Ilariani	Georgia	13.85	q
21	1	4	Matthias Bühler	Germany	13.93	Q
22	1	2	Dario Seghers	Belgium	13.95	Q
23	1	6	Ladji Doucouré	France	13.96	Q
24	3	3	Jackson Quiñónez	Spain	13.97	
25	5	6	Rasul Dabó	Portugal	14.00	Q
26	5	5	Richard Alleyne	Great Britain	14.02	
27	1	7	Francisco Javier López	Spain	14.03	
28	5	1	Mantas Šilkauskas	Lithuania	14.11	
29	5	2	Alexandros Stavrides	Cyprus	14.14	
30	1	3	Dominik Bochenek	Poland	14.15	
31	4	3	Joona-Ville Heinä	Finland	14.21	
32	4	2	Martin Arnaudov	Bulgaria	14.32	
	4	5	Ben Reynolds	Ireland	DNS	

=== Semifinals ===
First 2 in each heat (Q) and 2 best performers (q) advance to the Semifinals.

Wind:
Heat 1: 0.0 m/s, Heat 2: -1.1 m/s, Heat 3: -0.3 m/s

Rank	Heat	Lane	Name	Nationality	Time	Note
1	2	3	Sergey Shubenkov	Russia	13.09	Q, EL, NR
2	3	3	Garfield Darien	France	13.15	Q, PB
3	3	5	Konstadinos Douvalidis	Greece	13.37	Q, NR
4	3	6	Emanuele Abate	Italy	13.39	q
5	1	4	Artur Noga	Poland	13.43	Q
5	2	6	Alexander John	Germany	13.43	Q
7	1	6	Philip Nossmy	Sweden	13.47	Q, SB
8	3	4	Gregory Sedoc	Netherlands	13.48	q
9	2	7	Samuel Coco-Viloin	France	13.50	SB
10	1	5	Matthias Bühler	Germany	13.52	
11	1	3	William Sharman	Great Britain	13.55	=SB
12	2	4	João Almeida	Portugal	13.56	NR
13	1	1	Maksim Lynsha	Belarus	13.58	SB
14	1	8	Dániel Kiss	Hungary	13.59	
15	3	7	Gregor Traber	Germany	13.62	
16	1	2	Ladji Doucouré	France	13.66	
17	2	5	Balázs Baji	Hungary	13.68	
17	3	2	Gianni Frankis	Great Britain	13.68	=SB
19	3	1	Rasul Dabó	Portugal	13.73	
20	3	8	Vladimir Vukicevic	Norway	13.76	
21	1	7	Dario Seghers	Belgium	13.81	
22	2	8	Paolo dal Molin	Italy	13.85	
23	2	2	David Ilariani	Georgia	13.88	
	2	1	Adrien Deghelt	Belgium	DNF	

=== Final ===
Wind: +0.5 m/s

Rank	Lane	Name	Nationality	Time	Note
1st place, gold medalist(s)	4	Sergey Shubenkov	Russia	13.16	
2nd place, silver medalist(s)	3	Garfield Darien	France	13.20	
3rd place, bronze medalist(s)	5	Artur Noga	Poland	13.27	=NR
4	8	Alexander John	Germany	13.38	PB
5	1	Emanuele Abate	Italy	13.43	
6	2	Gregory Sedoc	Netherlands	13.45	
7	7	Philip Nossmy	Sweden	13.59	
8	6	Konstadinos Douvalidis	Greece	13.59	
