= 2008 World Junior Championships in Athletics – Men's 110 metres hurdles =

The men's 110 metres hurdles event at the 2008 World Junior Championships in Athletics was held in Bydgoszcz, Poland, at Zawisza Stadium on 11, 12 and 13 July. 99.0 cm (3'3) (junior implement) hurdles were used.

== Medalists ==
Gold	Konstantin Shabanov; Russia
Silver	Booker Nunley; United States
Bronze	Keiron Stewart; Jamaica

== Results ==
=== Final ===
13 July
Wind: +1.1 m/s

Rank	Name	Nationality	Time	Notes
1st place, gold medalist(s)	Konstantin Shabanov	Russia	13.27	
2nd place, silver medalist(s)	Booker Nunley	United States	13.45	
3rd place, bronze medalist(s)	Keiron Stewart	Jamaica	13.51	
4	Sami Al-Haydar	Saudi Arabia	13.51	
5	Aleksey Dremin	Russia	13.52	
6	Jin Nakamura	Japan	13.53	
7	Balázs Baji	Hungary	13.60	
8	Quentin Ruffacq	Belgium	13.65	

=== Semifinals ===
12 July

==== Semifinal 1 ====
Wind: -0.9 m/s

Rank	Name	Nationality	Time	Notes
1	Sami Al-Haydar	Saudi Arabia	13.67	Q
2	Aleksey Dremin	Russia	13.68	Q
3	Andreas Martinsen	Denmark	13.83	
4	Abdulaziz Al-Mandeel	Kuwait	13.84	
5	David Arzola	Cuba	14.03	
6	Luca Zecchin	Italy	14.04	
7	Jordan Nicolas	France	15.09	
8	Warren Weir	Jamaica	15.54	

==== Semifinal 2 ====
Wind: -1.7 m/s

Rank	Name	Nationality	Time	Notes
1	Konstantin Shabanov	Russia	13.41	Q
2	Quentin Ruffacq	Belgium	13.57	Q
3	Jin Nakamura	Japan	13.60	q
4	Ronald Brookins	United States	13.80	
5	Richard Bienasch	Germany	13.82	
6	Edirin Okoro	United Kingdom	13.91	
7	Martin Mazác	Czech Republic	14.19	
8	Denis Semenov	Kazakhstan	14.19	

==== Semifinal 3 ====
Wind: -1.0 m/s

Rank	Name	Nationality	Time	Notes
1	Booker Nunley	United States	13.55	Q
2	Keiron Stewart	Jamaica	13.61	Q
3	Balázs Baji	Hungary	13.62	q
4	Wataru Yazawa	Japan	13.67	
5	Ko Wen-Ting	Chinese Taipei	13.73	
6	Karlis Daube	Latvia	13.95	
7	Marcos Chuva	Portugal	13.99	
8	Alex Al-Ameen	United Kingdom	14.14	

=== Heats ===
11 July

==== Heat 1 ====
Wind: -2.0 m/s

Rank	Name	Nationality	Time	Notes
1	Quentin Ruffacq	Belgium	13.78	Q
2	Sami Al-Haydar	Saudi Arabia	13.96	Q
3	Martin Mazác	Czech Republic	14.03	q
4	Florin Draghici	Romania	14.26	
5	Durell Busby	Trinidad and Tobago	14.32	
6	Geormys Jaramillo	Venezuela	14.34	
7	Lyes Mokddel	Algeria	14.56	
8	Justin Baker	Canada	14.65	

==== Heat 2 ====
Wind: -0.7 m/s

Rank	Name	Nationality	Time	Notes
1	Balázs Baji	Hungary	13.82	Q
2	Jordan Nicolas	France	13.94	Q
3	Alex Al-Ameen	United Kingdom	14.00	q
4	Alexandros Stavridis	Cyprus	14.09	
5	Rauno Kirschbaum	Estonia	14.30	
6	Simon Léveillé	Canada	14.42	
7	Dominik Distelberger	Austria	14.52	
8	Ahmed Hazer	Lebanon	14.75	

==== Heat 3 ====
Wind: -0.6 m/s

Rank	Name	Nationality	Time	Notes
1	Keiron Stewart	Jamaica	13.84	Q
2	Denis Semenov	Kazakhstan	14.18	Q
3	Michał Szade	Poland	14.30	
4	Paraschiv Eftimie	Romania	14.58	
5	Tjendo Samuel	Netherlands	15.13	
6	Greggmar Swift	Barbados	15.77	
	Frédéric Zizi	France	DQ	IAAF rule 162.7
	Jhoanis Portilla	Cuba	DNF	

==== Heat 4 ====
Wind: -1.7 m/s

Rank	Name	Nationality	Time	Notes
1	Aleksey Dremin	Russia	13.89	Q
2	Ronald Brookins	United States	13.98	Q
3	Sergey Anoshkin	Kazakhstan	14.59	
4	Karim Manaoui	Switzerland	14.68	
5	Andreas Idås	Norway	14.89	
6	Nelson Acebey	Bolivia	15.23	
	Josué Reyes	Puerto Rico	DQ	IAAF rule 162.7

==== Heat 5 ====
Wind: -1.4 m/s

Rank	Name	Nationality	Time	Notes
1	Konstantin Shabanov	Russia	13.73	Q
2	Karlis Daube	Latvia	13.91	Q
3	Luca Zecchin	Italy	14.07	q
4	Erik Leeflang	Netherlands	14.20	
5	Markus Sparrman	Sweden	14.26	
6	Alyn Camara	Germany	14.37	
7	Francisco Javier López	Spain	14.56	
8	Roni Ollikainen	Finland	14.59	
9	Emilio Estrada	Mexico	15.06	

==== Heat 6 ====
Wind: -1.3 m/s

Rank	Name	Nationality	Time	Notes
1	Warren Weir	Jamaica	13.65	Q
2	Jin Nakamura	Japan	13.74	Q
3	David Arzola	Cuba	13.84	q
4	Marcos Chuva	Portugal	13.98	q
5	Edirin Okoro	United Kingdom	13.99	q
6	Arttu Niinikoski	Finland	14.15	
7	Kristen Hepburn-Taylor	Bahamas	14.69	
8	Lee Yen-Lin	Chinese Taipei	14.90	

==== Heat 7 ====
Wind: -1.0 m/s

Rank	Name	Nationality	Time	Notes
1	Booker Nunley	United States	13.68	Q
2	Richard Bienasch	Germany	13.80	Q
3	Wataru Yazawa	Japan	13.83	q
4	Andreas Martinsen	Denmark	13.95	q
5	Luís Fernando Ferreira	Brazil	14.38	
6	Rasul Dabó	Portugal	14.47	
7	Zachariasz Dereziński	Poland	14.55	
8	Vladimir Vukicevic	Norway	14.59	
9	Emre Karademir	Turkey	14.66	

==== Heat 8 ====
Wind: -0.7 m/s

Rank	Name	Nationality	Time	Notes
1	Abdulaziz Al-Mandeel	Kuwait	14.04	Q
2	Ko Wen-Ting	Chinese Taipei	14.05	Q
3	Tomáš Kavka	Czech Republic	14.19	
4	Viliam Papso	Slovakia	14.34	
5	Davide Redaelli	Italy	14.51	
6	Amir Shaker	Sweden	14.66	
7	Aivaras Mieliauskas	Lithuania	14.95	
8	Paseka Fangupo	Tonga	15.86	

== Participation ==
According to an unofficial count, 65 athletes from 45 countries participated in the event.

- Algeria (1)
- Austria (1)
- Bahamas (1)
- Barbados (1)
- Belgium (1)
- Bolivia (1)
- Brazil (1)
- Canada (2)
- Chinese Taipei (2)
- Cuba (2)
- Cyprus (1)
- Czech Republic (2)
- Denmark (1)
- Estonia (1)
- Finland (2)
- France (2)
- Germany (2)
- Hungary (1)
- Italy (2)
- Jamaica (2)
- Japan (2)
- Kazakhstan (2)
- Kuwait (1)
- Latvia (1)
- Lebanon (1)
- Lithuania (1)
- Mexico (1)
- Netherlands (2)
- Norway (2)
- Poland (2)
- Portugal (2)
- Puerto Rico (1)
- Romania (2)
- Russia (2)
- Saudi Arabia (1)
- Slovakia (1)
- Spain (1)
- Sweden (2)
- Switzerland (1)
- Tonga (1)
- Trinidad and Tobago (1)
- Turkey (1)
- United Kingdom (2)
- United States (2)
- Venezuela (1)
