= 2013 European Athletics Indoor Championships – Men's 60 metres hurdles =

The Men's 60 metres hurdles event at the 2013 European Athletics Indoor Championships was held at March 1, 2013 at 10:30 (round 1), 18:05 (semi-final) and 19:45 (final) local time.

== Records ==
Standing records prior to the 2013 European Athletics Indoor Championships
World record	Colin Jackson (GBR)	7.30	Sindelfingen, Germany	6 March 1994
European record	Colin Jackson (GBR)	7.30	Sindelfingen, Germany	6 March 1994
Championship record	Colin Jackson (GBR)	7.39	Paris, France	12 March 1994
World Leading	Kevin Craddock (USA)	7.50	Düsseldorf, Germany	8 February 2013
World Leading	Sergey Shubenkov (RUS)	7.50	Moscow, Russia	12 February 2013
European Leading	Sergey Shubenkov (RUS)	7.50	Moscow, Russia	12 February 2013

== Results ==
=== Round 1 ===
Qualification: First 3 (Q) or and the 4 fastest athletes (q) advanced to the final.

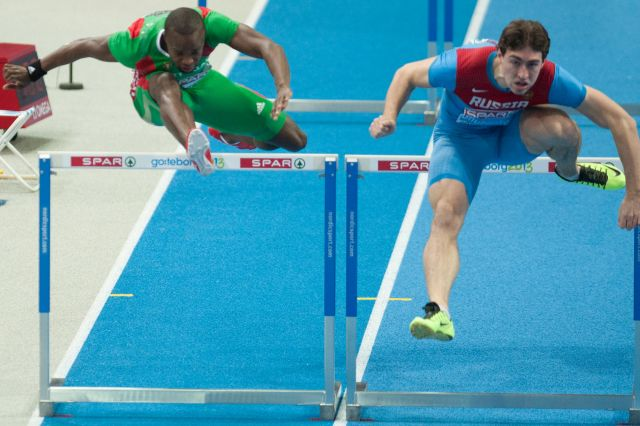
Rasul Dabó (left) and Sergey Shubenkov in heat 3.

Rank	Heat	Athlete	Nationality	Time	Note
1	3	Sergey Shubenkov	Russia	7.52	Q
2	1	Pascal Martinot-Lagarde	France	7.58	Q
3	4	Paolo Dal Molin	Italy	7.59	Q, =PB
4	1	Erik Balnuweit	Germany	7.61	Q
5	2	Balázs Baji	Hungary	7.67	Q
6	3	Rasul Dabó	Portugal	7.68	Q, NR
7	2	Konstantin Shabanov	Russia	7.69	Q
8	2	Jackson Quiñónez	Spain	7.70	Q, SB
8	4	Dominik Bochenek	Poland	7.70	Q, SB
8	4	Konstadínos Douvalídis	Greece	7.70	Q, SB
11	3	Maksim Lynsha	Belarus	7.72	Q
11	4	Dimitri Bascou	France	7.72	q
13	1	Francisco Javier López	Spain	7.75	Q, PB
14	1	Aleksey Dryomin	Russia	7.76	q
14	2	Philip Nossmy	Sweden	7.76	q, SB
16	4	Vladimir Vukicevic	Norway	7.78	q
16	2	Matthias Bühler	Germany	7.78	
18	1	Serhiy Kopanayko	Ukraine	7.82	PB
19	1	Alexander Brorsson	Sweden	7.85	
19	2	Stefano Tedesco	Italy	7.85	PB
21	1	Koen Smet	Netherlands	7.86	
21	3	Martin Mazáč	Czech Republic	7.86	
21	3	Viliam Papso	Slovakia	7.86	=SB
24	2	Andres Raja	Estonia	7.90	
25	4	Juan Ramón Barragán	Spain	7.93	
25	2	Milan Trajkovic	Cyprus	7.95	
27	4	Filip Lööv	Sweden	8.02	
	3	Oleksiy Kasyanov	Ukraine	DNF	

=== Semi-final ===
Qualification: First 4 (Q) advanced to the final.

Rank	Heat	Athlete	Nationality	Time	Note
1	2	Sergey Shubenkov	Russia	7.52	Q
2	1	Paolo Dal Molin	Italy	7.58	Q, PB
3	2	Erik Balnuweit	Germany	7.59	Q, PB
4	2	Balázs Baji	Hungary	7.59	Q
5	1	Pascal Martinot-Lagarde	France	7.61	Q
6	1	Konstantin Shabanov	Russia	7.63	Q
7	1	Konstadínos Douvalídis	Greece	7.64	Q, SB
8	2	Maksim Lynsha	Belarus	7.67	Q, SB
9	2	Vladimir Vukicevic	Norway	7.69	NR
10	2	Dominik Bochenek	Poland	7.71	
11	2	Jackson Quiñónez	Spain	7.72	
12	2	Dimitri Bascou	France	7.72	
13	1	Rasul Dabó	Portugal	7.73	
14	1	Philip Nossmy	Sweden	7.78	
15	1	Aleksey Dryomin	Russia	7.79	
16	1	Francisco Javier López	Spain	7.88	

=== Final ===
The final was held at 19:45.

Rank	Lane	Athlete	Nationality	Time	Note
1st place, gold medalist(s)	6	Sergey Shubenkov	Russia	7.49	WL
2nd place, silver medalist(s)	4	Paolo Dal Molin	Italy	7.51	NR
3rd place, bronze medalist(s)	3	Pascal Martinot-Lagarde	France	7.53	=PB
4	8	Balázs Baji	Hungary	7.56	=NR
5	5	Erik Balnuweit	Germany	7.58	PB
6	2	Maksim Lynsha	Belarus	7.58	PB
7	1	Konstadínos Douvalídis	Greece	7.64	=SB
8	7	Konstantin Shabanov	Russia	7.66	
