= 2014 IAAF World Indoor Championships – Men's 60 metres hurdles =

Men's 60 metres hurdles at the 2014 IAAF World Indoor Championships
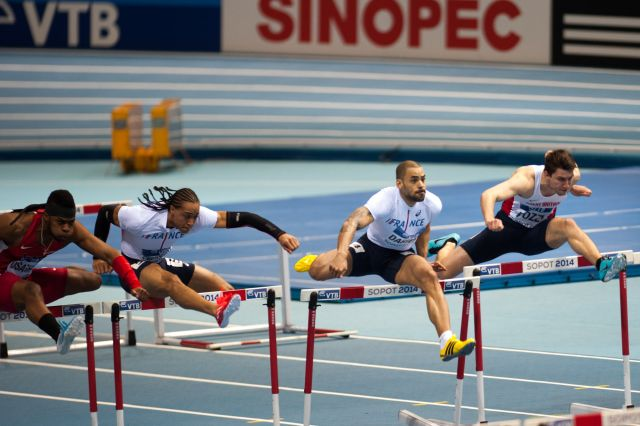
- From L to R: Osaghae, Martinot-Lagarde, Darien and Pozzi in the final.
- Venue: Ergo Arena
- Dates: 8 March (heats); 9 March (semifinals and final)
- Competitors: 31 from 25 nations
- Winning time: 7.45 WL

Medalists
gold medal	Omo Osaghae	United States
silver medal	Pascal Martinot-Lagarde	France
bronze medal	Garfield Darien	France

The men's 60 metres hurdles at the 2014 IAAF World Indoor Championships took place on 8–9 March 2014.

== Records ==
Standing records prior to the 2014 IAAF World Indoor Championships
World record	Colin Jackson (GBR)	7.30	Sindelfingen, Germany	6 March 1994
Championship record	Dayron Robles (CUB)	7.34	Doha, Qatar	14 March 2010
World leading	Orlando ORTEGA, (CUB)	7.45	Lodz, Poland	17 February 2015
African record	Shaun Bownes (RSA)	7.52	Ghent, Belgium	23 February 2001
Asian record	Liu Xiang (CHN)	7.41	Birmingham, Great Britain	18 February 2012
European record	Colin Jackson (GBR)	7.30	Sindelfingen, Germany	6 March 1994
North and Central American and Caribbean record	Dayron Robles (CUB)	7.33	Düsseldorf, Germany	8 February 2008
Oceanian record	Kyle Vander Kuyp (AUS)	7.73	Barcelona, Spain	11 March 1995
Oceanian record	Kyle Vander Kuyp (AUS)	7.73	Barcelona, Spain	12 March 1995
Oceanian record	Kyle Vander Kuyp (AUS)	7.73	Paris, France	8 March 1997
South American record	Márcio de Souza (BRA)	7.60	Karlsruhe, Germany	15 February 2004
Records broken during the 2014 IAAF World Indoor Championships
World leading	Omo Osaghae (USA)	7.45	Sopot, Poland	9 March 2014

== Qualification standards ==
Indoor	Outdoor
7.74	13.50 (110 mH)

== Schedule ==
Date	Time	Round
8 March 2014	10:10	Heats
9 March 2014	15:45	Semifinals
9 March 2014	18:20	Final

== Results ==
=== Heats ===
Qualification: First 3 in each heat (Q) and the next 4 fastest (q) qualified for the semifinal.

Rank	Heat	Lane	Name	Nationality	Time	Notes
=1	1	4	Pascal Martinot-Lagarde	France	7.56	Q
=1	4	1	Andrew Pozzi	Great Britain	7.56	Q, PB
=1	4	5	Garfield Darien	France	7.56	Q
4	3	5	William Sharman	Great Britain	7.59	Q, PB
=5	3	7	Omo Osaghae	United States	7.61	Q
=5	2	2	Dominic Berger	United States	7.61	Q
7	2	5	Sergey Shubenkov	Russia	7.62	Q
8	4	7	Balázs Baji	Hungary	7.63	Q, SB
9	1	3	Erik Balnuweit	Germany	7.64	Q
10	4	4	Konstadinos Douvalidis	Greece	7.65	q
11	2	3	Andrew Riley	Jamaica	7.66	Q
12	3	8	Dominik Bochenek	Poland	7.68	Q
13	3	4	Konstantin Shabanov	Russia	7.71	q
14	4	6	Gregor Traber	Germany	7.73	q
=15	1	8	Xie Wenjun	China	7.74	Q
=15	3	6	Jhoanis Portilla	Cuba	7.74	q, PB
=15	1	7	Abdulaziz Al-Mandeel	Kuwait	7.74	NR
18	2	6	Yordan O'Farrill	Cuba	7.75	SB
19	1	6	Paolo Dal Molin	Italy	7.76	
20	2	4	Jackson Quiñónez	Spain	7.78	
21	3	3	Aliaksandr Linnik	Belarus	7.79	
22	2	8	Koen Smet	Netherlands	7.80	
23	2	1	Martin Mazáč	Czech Republic	7.90	
24	4	3	Philip Nossmy	Sweden	7.92	
25	3	2	Héctor Cotto	Puerto Rico	7.94	
26	1	2	Amir Shaker	Iraq	7.96	NR
27	4	2	Iong Kim Fai	Macau	8.34	NR
28	3	1	Nelson Camilo Acebey	Bolivia	8.48	PB
29	2	7	Eslam Abdelatif	Egypt	8.69	PB
	4	8	Michael Herreros	Guam	DQ	R168.7(a)
	1	5	Rasul Dabó	Portugal	DNF	

=== Semifinals ===
Qualification: First 4 in each heat (Q) qualified for the final.

Rank	Heat	Lane	Name	Nationality	Time	Notes
1	1	5	Omo Osaghae	United States	7.49	Q, PB
2	1	6	Pascal Martinot-Lagarde	France	7.50	Q
3	2	6	Garfield Darien	France	7.52	Q, PB
4	1	3	William Sharman	Great Britain	7.53	Q, PB
5	1	4	Erik Balnuweit	Germany	7.54	Q, PB
6	2	4	Andrew Pozzi	Great Britain	7.56	Q, PB
7	2	1	Gregor Traber	Germany	7.58	Q, PB
8	2	8	Andrew Riley	Jamaica	7.59	Q, SB
9	1	1	Konstadinos Douvalidis	Greece	7.62	
10	1	8	Balázs Baji	Hungary	7.63	SB
11	2	3	Dominic Berger	United States	7.64	
12	2	7	Dominik Bochenek	Poland	7.66	
13	2	5	Sergey Shubenkov	Russia	7.66	
14	1	2	Konstantin Shabanov	Russia	7.67	
15	1	7	Xie Wenjun	China	7.71	
16	2	2	Jhoanis Portilla	Cuba	8.03	

=== Final ===
Rank	Lane	Name	Nationality	Time	Notes
1st place, gold medalist(s)	6	Omo Osaghae	United States	7.45	WL
2nd place, silver medalist(s)	5	Pascal Martinot-Lagarde	France	7.46	
3rd place, bronze medalist(s)	4	Garfield Darien	France	7.47	PB
4	3	Andrew Pozzi	Great Britain	7.53	PB
5	8	Gregor Traber	Germany	7.56	PB
6	1	Erik Balnuweit	Germany	7.56	
7	7	William Sharman	Great Britain	7.60	
	2	Andrew Riley	Jamaica	DNS	
