= Rasul Dabó =

Portuguese hurdler

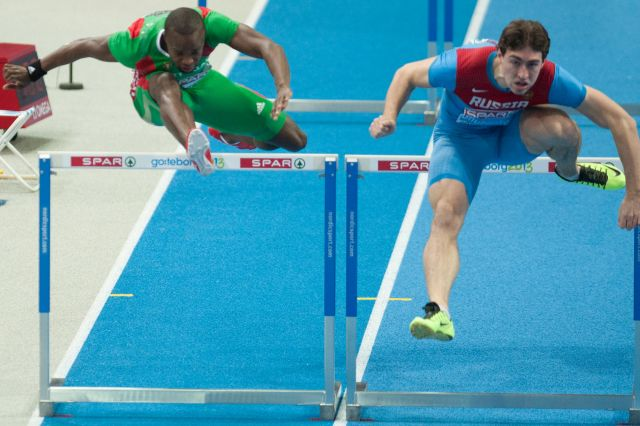
- Rasul Dabó (left) in 2013

Personal information
- Born: 14 February 1989
- Height: 1.85 m (6 ft 1 in)
- Weight: 82 kg (181 lb)

Sport
- Sport: Athletics
- Event: 110 m hurdles
- Coached by: JOMA (1997–2010); Benfica (2011–2016); Sporting CP (2016–)

Rasul Amanha Carvalho Dabó (born 14 February 1989) is a Portuguese athlete of Bissau-Guinean descent specialising in the sprint hurdles. He represented his country at the 2014 World Indoor Championships without finishing his heat.

His personal bests are 13.52 seconds in the 110 metres hurdles (+1.0 m/s, La Chaux-de-Fonds 2013) and 7.66 seconds in the 60 metres hurdles (Metz 2014).

== International competitions ==
Year	Competition	Venue	Position	Event	Notes
Representing Portugal
2008	World Junior Championships	Bydgoszcz, Poland	39th (h)	110 m hurdles (99 cm)	14.47
2009	Lusophony Games	Lisbon, Portugal	3rd	110 m hurdles	14.35
2009	Lusophony Games	Lisbon, Portugal	5th	400 m hurdles	54.17
2010	Ibero-American Championships	San Fernando, Spain	7th	110 m hurdles	14.33
2011	European Indoor Championships	Paris, France	18th (h)	60 m hurdles	7.93
2011	European U23 Championships	Ostrava, Czech Republic	9th (sf)	110 m hurdles	13.90
2012	European Championships	Helsinki, Finland	19th (sf)	110 m hurdles	13.73
2013	European Indoor Championships	Gothenburg, Sweden	13th (sf)	60 m hurdles	7.73
2014	World Indoor Championships	Sopot, Poland	–	60 m hurdles	DNF
2016	Ibero-American Championships	Rio de Janeiro, Brazil	7th	110 m hurdles	14.25
2019	European Indoor Championships	Glasgow, United Kingdom	28th (h)	60 m hurdles	8.03
