= Andreas Martinsen (athlete) =

Danish hurdler (born 1990)

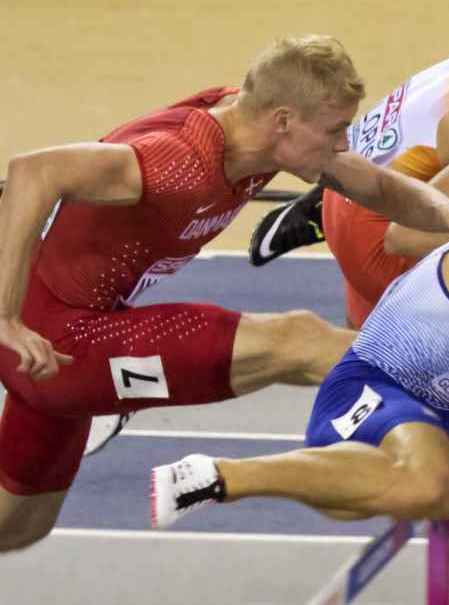
- Andreas Martinsen in 2019

Personal information
- Born: 17 July 1990 (age 35)
- Height: 1.90 m (6 ft 3 in)
- Weight: 82 kg (181 lb)

Sport
- Sport: Athletics
- Event: 110 m hurdles
- Club: Århus 1900; AK-Holstebro
- Coached by: Mikkel Larsen

Andreas Martinsen (born 17 July 1990) is a Danish athlete specialising in the sprint hurdles. He represented his country at the 2016 World Indoor Championships reaching the semifinals.

His personal bests are 13.50 seconds in the 110 metres hurdles (+1.0 m/s, Copenhagen Athletics Games) and 7.68 seconds in the 60 metres hurdles (Belgrade, 2017) - both national records.

== Competition record ==
Year	Competition	Venue	Position	Event	Notes
Representing Denmark
2007	World Youth Championships	Ostrava, Czech Republic	4th	110 m hurdles (91.4 cm)	13.86
2007	European Youth Olympic Festival	Belgrade, Serbia	3rd	110 m hurdles (91.4 cm)	13.96
2008	World Junior Championships	Bydgoszcz, Poland	13th (sf)	110 m hurdles (99 cm)	13.83
2009	European Junior Championships	Novi Sad, Serbia	5th (sf)	110 m hurdles (99 cm)	13.49^{1}
2011	European Indoor Championships	Paris, France	23rd (h)	60 m hurdles	8.38
2011	European U23 Championships	Ostrava, Czech Republic	13th (sf)	110 m hurdles	14.10
2014	European Championships	Zürich, Switzerland	27th (h)	110 m hurdles	13.97
2015	European Indoor Championships	Prague, Czech Republic	13th (sf)	60 m hurdles	7.73
2016	World Indoor Championships	Portland, United States	13th (sf)	60 m hurdles	7.75
2016	European Championships	Amsterdam, Netherlands	23rd (sf)	110 m hurdles	13.89
2017	European Indoor Championships	Belgrade, Serbia	8th	60 m hurdles	7.68 NR
2019	European Indoor Championships	Glasgow, United Kingdom	16th (sf)	60 m hurdles	7.96
2021	European Indoor Championships	Toruń, Poland	21st (sf)	60 m hurdles	7.87

^{1}Did not finish in the final
