= Francisco Javier López (hurdler, born 1989) =

Spanish hurdler

Personal information
- Full name: Francisco Javier López
- Born: 29 December 1989 Córdoba, Andalusia, Spain
- Education: University of Seville; Texas A&M University–Kingsville
- Height: 1.84 m (6 ft 0 in)
- Weight: 76 kg (168 lb)

Sport
- Sport: Athletics
- Event: 110 m hurdles
- College team: Texas A&M–Kingsville Javelinas
- Club: Playas de Castellón
- Coached by: Julián Ernesto González

Francisco Javier López (born 29 December 1989) is a Spanish athlete specialising in the sprint hurdles. He won a bronze medal at the 2012 Ibero-American Championships and a gold medal at the 2013 Spanish National Championships.

His personal bests are 13.62 seconds in the 110 metres hurdles (+1.2 m/s, Castellón 2015) and 7.69 seconds in the 60 metres hurdles (Pittsburgh 2016).

== International competitions ==
Year	Competition	Venue	Position	Event	Notes
Representing Spain
2007	European Junior Championships	Hengelo, Netherlands	28th (h)	110 m hurdles (99 cm)	14.45
2008	World Junior Championships	Bydgoszcz, Poland	43rd (h)	110 m hurdles (99 cm)	14.56
2010	European Championships	Barcelona, Spain	27th (h)	110 m hurdles	14.15
2011	European U23 Championships	Ostrava, Czech Republic	14th (sf)	110 m hurdles	14.31
2012	Ibero-American Championships	Barquisimeto, Venezuela	3rd	110 m hurdles	13.77
2012	European Championships	Helsinki, Finland	27th (h)	110 m hurdles	14.03
2013	European Indoor Championships	Gothenburg, Sweden	16th (sf)	60 m hurdles	7.88
2013	Universiade	Kazan, Russia	5th	110 m hurdles	13.78
