= 2016 European Athletics Championships – Men's 110 metres hurdles =

Men's 110 metres hurdles at the European Athletics Championships
- Venue: Olympic Stadium
- Location: Amsterdam
- Dates: 8 July (round 1); 9 July (semifinals & final)
- Competitors: 31 from 16 nations
- Winning time: 13.25

Medalists
gold medal	Dmitri Bascou	France
silver medal	Balázs Baji	Hungary
bronze medal	Wilhem Belocian	France

The men's 110 metres hurdles at the 2016 European Athletics Championships took place at the Olympic Stadium on 8 and 9 July.

== Records ==
Standing records prior to the 2016 European Athletics Championships
World record	Aries Merritt (USA)	12.80	Brussels, Belgium	7 September 2012
European record	Colin Jackson (GBR)	12.91	Stuttgart, Germany	20 August 1993
Championship record	Colin Jackson (GBR)	13.02	Budapest, Hungary	22 August 1998
World Leading	Omar McLeod (JAM)	12.98	Shanghai, China	14 May 2016
European Leading	Orlando Ortega (ESP)	13.12	Doha, Qatar	6 May 2016

== Schedule ==
Date	Time	Round
8 July 2016	12:55	Round 1
9 July 2016	19:15	Semifinal
9 July 2016	21:30	Final

All times are local times (UTC+2)

== Results ==
=== Round 1 ===
First 3 in each heat (Q) and the next fastest 4 (q) advance to the Semifinals. 12 fastest entrants awarded bye to Semifinals.

Wind:
Heat 1: +0.3 m/s, Heat 2: -0.5 m/s, Heat 3: 0.0 m/s

Rank	Heat	Lane	Name	Nationality	Time	Note
1	1	3	Milan Trajkovic	Cyprus	13.39	Q, NR
2	1	6	Yidiel Contreras	Spain	13.46	Q, =SB
3	3	5	David King	Great Britain	13.55	Q
4	2	8	Emanuele Abate	Italy	13.63	Q, SB
5	1	8	Andreas Martinsen	Denmark	13.65	Q, SB
6	3	3	Lorenzo Perini	Italy	13.68	Q
7	1	2	Hassane Fofana	Italy	13.71	q
8	1	7	Elmo Lakka	Finland	13.72	q, PB
9	1	5	Serhiy Kopanayko	Ukraine	13.74	q, PB
10	2	4	Matthias Bühler	Germany	13.75	Q
11	2	5	Javier Colomo	Spain	13.76	Q
11	2	7	Vladimir Vukicevic	Norway	13.76	q
11	3	6	Valdó Szűcs	Hungary	13.76	Q
14	1	4	Ben Reynolds	Ireland	13.87	
14	2	3	Dominik Bochenek	Poland	13.87	
16	3	4	Gregory Sedoc	Netherlands	13.92	
17	3	7	Brahian Pena	Switzerland	13.98	
18	2	2	Tobias Furer	Switzerland	14.08	
19	3	2	Gerard Porras	Spain	14.11	
20	2	6	Artem Shamatryn	Ukraine	14.47	

=== Semifinals ===
First 2 in each heat (Q) and the next fastest 2 (q) advance to the Semifinals.

Wind:
Heat 1: -0.6 m/s, Heat 2: -1.8 m/s, Heat 3: -0.5 m/s

Rank	Heat	Lane	Name	Nationality	Time	Note
1	3	6	Dimitri Bascou*	France	13.20	Q, SB
2	2	7	Wilhem Belocian*	France	13.28	Q, =PB
3	2	6	Balázs Baji*	Hungary	13.29	Q, =NR
4	1	7	Andy Pozzi*	Great Britain	13.31	Q, =PB
5	2	5	Damian Czykier*	Poland	13.32	q, PB
6	1	4	Aurel Manga*	France	13.36	Q
7	1	5	Milan Trajkovic	Cyprus	13.40	q
8	1	6	Milan Ristić*	Serbia	13.45	
9	3	8	Yidiel Contreras	Spain	13.47	Q
10	3	5	Lawrence Clarke*	Great Britain	13.47	
11	3	4	Konstadinos Douvalidis*	Greece	13.50	
12	3	9	Hassane Fofana	Italy	13.52	PB
13	2	3	Emanuele Abate	Italy	13.54	SB
14	2	9	Vladimir Vukicevic	Norway	13.54	NR
15	2	8	David King	Great Britain	13.54	=PB
16	2	4	Alexander John*	Germany	13.60	
17	1	9	Matthias Bühler	Germany	13.65	
18	3	7	Gregor Traber*	Germany	13.66	
19	1	3	Valdó Szűcs	Hungary	13.76	
20	1	2	Lorenzo Perini	Italy	13.79	
21	2	2	Elmo Lakka	Finland	13.87	
22	1	8	Javier Colomo	Spain	13.88	
23	3	2	Andreas Martinsen	Denmark	13.89	
24	3	3	Serhiy Kopanayko	Ukraine	13.97	

*Athletes who received a bye to the semifinals

=== Final ===
Wind: 0.0 m/s

Rank	Lane	Name	Nationality	Time	Note
1st place, gold medalist(s)	7	Dimitri Bascou	France	13.25	
2nd place, silver medalist(s)	5	Balázs Baji	Hungary	13.28	NR
3rd place, bronze medalist(s)	4	Wilhem Belocian	France	13.33	
4	2	Damian Czykier	Poland	13.40	
5	3	Milan Trajkovic	Cyprus	13.44	
6	8	Aurel Manga	France	13.47	
7	9	Yidiel Contreras	Spain	13.54	
	6	Andy Pozzi	Great Britain	DNS	
