= Vladimir Vukicevic (athlete) =

Norwegian hurdler (born 1991)

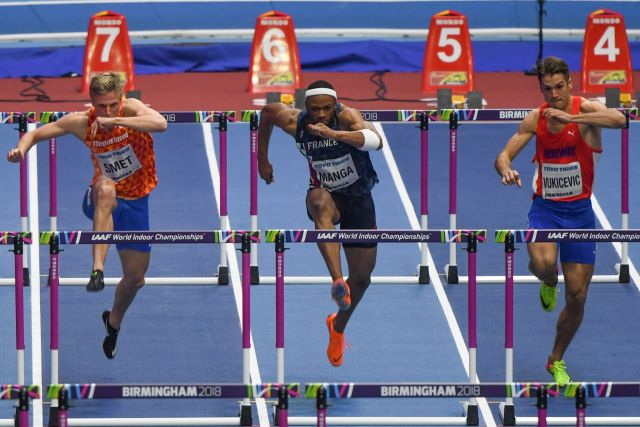
- Vukicevic (right) in 2018

Personal information
- Born: 6 May 1991 (age 34)
- Height: 1.92 m (6 ft 4 in)
- Weight: 85 kg (187 lb)

Sport
- Sport: Athletics
- Event(s): 110 m hurdles, 60 m hurdles
- Club: SK Vidar
- Coached by: Petar Vukićević

Vladimir Vukicevic (born 6 May 1991) is a Norwegian hurdler. He won a silver medal in the 110 metres hurdles at the 2010 World Junior Championships.

He is coached by his father, Petar Vukićević, a 1980 Olympic hurdler. Vladimir's sister, Christina Vukicevic, also competed in the sprint hurdles.

His personal bests are 13.42 seconds in the 110 metres hurdles (+1.7 m/s, La Chaux-de-Fonds 2021) and 7.69 seconds in the 60 metres hurdles (Gothenburg 2013). Both were Norwegian records, with the 60m hurdles record broken by Anthony Ommundsen Johnsen in 2026.

== International competitions ==
Year	Competition	Venue	Position	Event	Notes
Representing Norway
2008	World Junior Championships	Bydgoszcz, Poland	46th (h)	110 m hurdles (99 cm)	14.59
2009	European Junior Championships	Novi Sad, Serbia	10th (sf)	110 m hurdles (99 cm)	13.80
2010	World Junior Championships	Moncton, Canada	2nd	110 m hurdles (99 cm)	13.59
2011	Universiade	Shenzhen, China	17th (sf)	110 m hurdles	14.20
2011	European U23 Championships	Ostrava, Czech Republic	7th	110 m hurdles	13.90
2012	European Championships	Helsinki, Finland	20th (sf)	110 m hurdles	13.76
2013	European Indoor Championships	Gothenburg, Sweden	9th (sf)	60 m hurdles	7.69
2013	European U23 Championships	Tampere, Finland	4th	110 m hurdles	13.74
2014	European Championships	Zürich, Switzerland	27th (h)	110 m hurdles	13.97
2016	European Championships	Amsterdam, Netherlands	14th (sf)	110 m hurdles	13.54
2018	World Indoor Championships	Birmingham, United Kingdom	26th (h)	60 m hurdles	7.81
2018	European Championships	Berlin, Germany	22nd (sf)	110 m hurdles	13.71
2021	European Indoor Championships	Toruń, Poland	11th (sf)	60 m hurdles	7.73
2022	European Championships	Munich, Germany	12th (sf)	110 m hurdles	13.64
2023	European Indoor Championships	Istanbul, Turkey	12th (sf)	60 m hurdles	7.75
2024	European Championships	Rome, Italy	17th (h)	110 m hurdles	13.93
