= Konstantin Shabanov =

Russian hurdler (born 1989)

Konstantin Georgiyevich Shabanov (Russian: Константин Георгиевич Шабанов; born November 17, 1989, in Pskov) is a Russian track and field athlete who specialises in the 110 metres hurdles. He was the gold medallist in the event at the 2008 World Junior Championships in Athletics and represented his country at the 2012 Summer Olympics.

He is coached by his father, Georgiy Shabanov, who won medals as a Soviet hurdler at the European Athletics Junior Championships and the Universiade.

== International competitions ==
Representing Russia
Year	Competition	Venue	Position	Event	Notes
2008	World Junior Championships	Bydgoszcz, Poland	1st	110m hurdles (99.0 cm)	13.27 (wind: +1.1 m/s)
2008	World Junior Championships	Bydgoszcz, Poland	10th (h)	4 × 100 m relay	40.43
2009	European Indoor Championships	Turin, Italy	17th (h)	60 m hurdles	7.86
2009	European U23 Championships	Kaunas, Lithuania	12th (sf)	110 m hurdles	13.87
2010	European Championships	Barcelona, Spain	15th (h)	110 m hurdles	13.73
2011	European Indoor Championships	Paris, France	5th	60 m hurdles	7.61
2011	European U23 Championships	Ostrava, Czech Republic	10th (sf)	110m hurdles	13.94 (wind: -0.9 m/s)
2012	World Indoor Championships	Istanbul, Turkey	5th	60 m hurdles	7.60
2012	Olympic Games	London, United Kingdom	21st (sf)	110 m hurdles	13.65
2013	European Indoor Championships	Gothenburg, Sweden	8th	60 m hurdles	7.66
2013	Universiade	Kazan, Russia	2nd	110 m hurdles	13.46
2013	World Championships	Moscow, Russia	9th (h)	110 m hurdles	13.38
2014	World Indoor Championships	Sopot, Poland	14th (sf)	60 m hurdles	7.67
2014	European Championships	Zürich, Switzerland	13th (sf)	110 m hurdles	13.57
2015	European Indoor Championships	Prague, Czech Republic	10th (sf)	60 m hurdles	7.66
2015	Universiade	Gwangju, South Korea	2nd	110 m hurdles	13.57
