= Greggmar Swift =

Barbadian hurdler (born 1991)

Personal information
- Full name: Greggmar Orial Swift
- Nationality: Barbados
- Born: 16 February 1991 (age 35) Bridgetown, Saint Michael, Barbados
- Height: 6 ft 0 in (1.83 m)
- Weight: 170 lb (77 kg)

Sport
- Sport: Track and field
- Event: 110 metres hurdles
- College team: Indiana State University
- Club: Adidas
- Coached by: John Mc Nichols

Achievements and titles
- Personal best: 110 m hurdles 13.28 +0.8 Toronto (CIBC) 24 JUL 2015
- Updated on 16 May 2016

Greggmar Orial Swift (born 16 February 1991) is a Barbadian sprint hurdler. Greggmar attended Indiana State University, where he studied Insurance & Risk Management and was a Five-time All-American in the 60-meter and 110-meter hurdles. He competed in the 110 metres hurdles at the 2012 Summer Olympics. He qualified for the 2015 Pan-Am Games with his gold medal win at the Universiade.

== Personal bests ==
- 110 m hurdles outdoor: 13.28 s (wind: +0.8 m/s) – Toronto, Canada, 24 July 2015
- 60 m hurdles indoor: 7.54 s – Newark, United States, February 2015 NR

== Coaching ==
After his athletics career, Swift was a coach for the Indiana State, Merritt College, and the Minot State Beavers track and field teams.

== International competitions ==
Year	Competition	Venue	Position	Event	Notes
Representing Barbados
2007	CARIFTA Games (U17)	Providenciales, Turks and Caicos Islands	2nd	100m hurdles (91.4 cm)	13.39 (+0.5 m/s)
2008	CARIFTA Games (U20)	Basseterre, Saint Kitts and Nevis	3rd	110m hurdles (99.0 cm)	14.22 (-0.5 m/s)
2008	World Junior Championships	Bydgoszcz, Poland	61st (h)	110m hurdles (99.0 cm)	15.77 (-0.6 m/s)
2009	CARIFTA Games (U20)	Vieux Fort, Saint Lucia	3rd	110m hurdles (99.0 cm)	14.09 (+0.7 m/s)
2009	Pan American Junior Championships	Port of Spain, Trinidad and Tobago	8th	110m hurdles (99.0 cm)	14.31 (+2.0 m/s)
2010	CARIFTA Games (U20)	George Town, Cayman Islands	2nd	110m hurdles (99.0 cm)	13.75 (+1.3 m/s)
2010	CARIFTA Games (U20)	George Town, Cayman Islands	—	4 × 100 m relay	DNF
2010	Central American and Caribbean Junior Championships	Santo Domingo, Dominican Republic	1st	110m hurdles (99.0 cm)	13.90 (-1.0 m/s)
2010	Central American and Caribbean Junior Championships	Santo Domingo, Dominican Republic	5th	4 × 100 m relay	40.92
2010	World Junior Championships	Moncton, Canada	8th	110m hurdles (99.0 cm)	13.93 (-2.4 m/s)
2011	Central American and Caribbean Championships	Mayagüez, Puerto Rico	6th	110m hurdles	13.84 (+0.7 m/s)
2011	Universiade	Shenzhen, China	9th (sf)	110m hurdles	13.90 (-1.0 m/s)
2012	NACAC Under-23 Championships	Irapuato, Mexico	3rd	110m hurdles	13.54 (+1.8 m/s)
2012	NACAC Under-23 Championships	Irapuato, Mexico	5th	4 × 100 m relay	40.30
2012	Olympic Games	London, United Kingdom	5th (h)	110m hurdles	13.62 (+0.1 m/s)
2013	Universiade	Kazan, Russia	7th (h)^{1}	110m hurdles	13.75 (+0.7 m/s)
2013	World Championships	Moscow, Russia	27th (h)	110m hurdles	13.79 (-0.6 m/s)
2014	Commonwealth Games	Glasgow, United Kingdom	6th	110m hurdles	13.74 (-0.3 m/s)
2014	Central American and Caribbean Games	Xalapa, Mexico	3rd	110m hurdles	13.59 A (+0.7 m/s)
2015	Universiade	Gwangju, South Korea	1st	100m hurdles	13.43 (+0.7 m/s)
2015	Pan American Games	Toronto, Canada	4th	110m hurdles	13.28 (+0.8 m/s)
2015	NACAC Championships	San José, Costa Rica	5th	110m hurdles	13.40 (+1.5 m/s)
2015	World Championships	Beijing, China	17th (sf)	110m hurdles	13.44 (-0.2 m/s)
2019	Pan American Games	Lima, Peru	4th	110m hurdles	13.51

^{1}: Did not finish in the final.
