= Artur Noga =

Polish hurdler (born 1988)

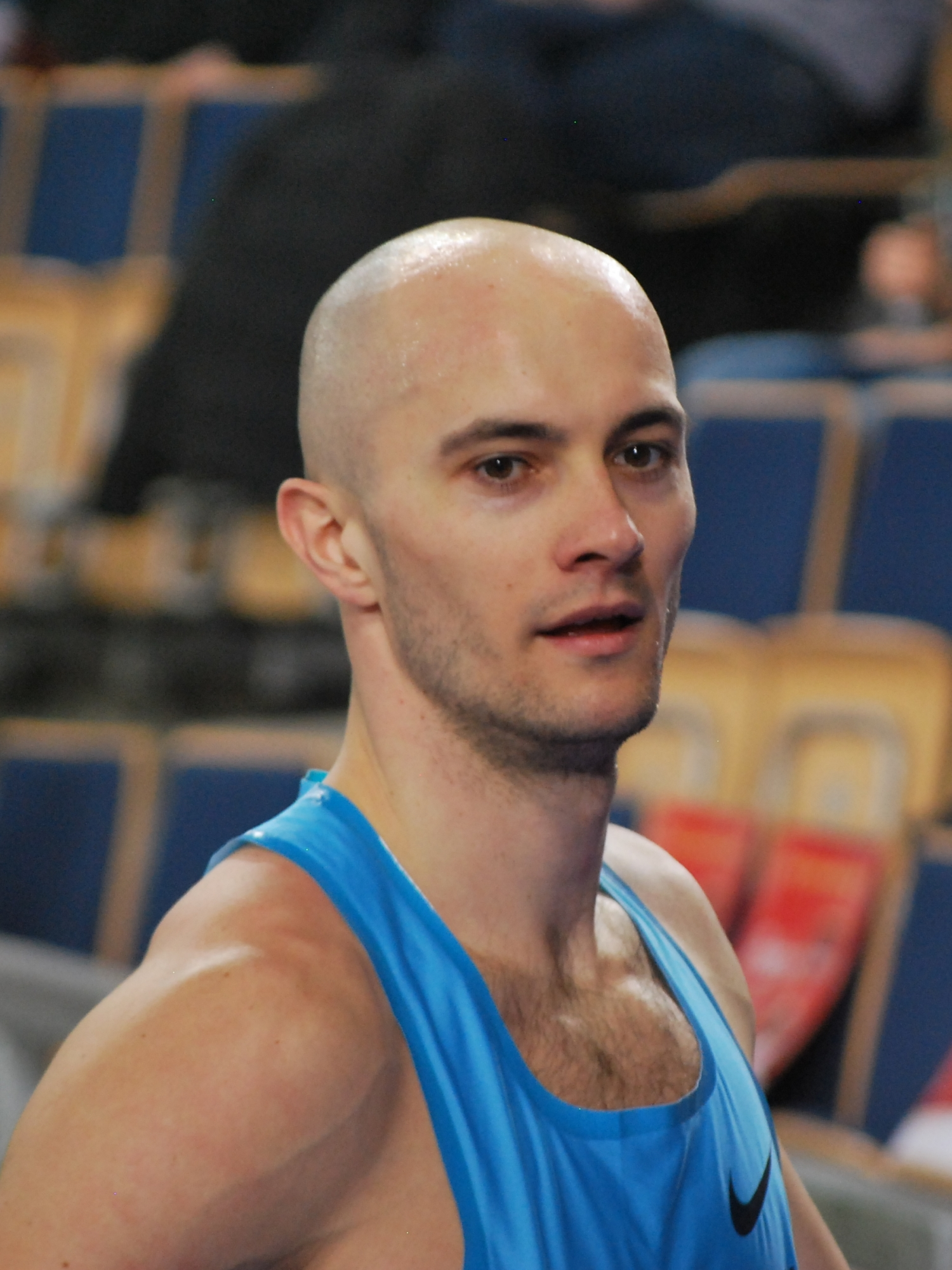
- Noga in 2015

Personal information
- Nationality: Polish
- Born: 2 May 1988 (age 38) Racibórz, Poland
- Height: 1.96 m (6 ft 5 in)
- Weight: 92 kg (203 lb)

Sport
- Sport: Athletics
- Event: 110 m hurdles
- Club: KS Warszawianka
Medal record
Men's athletics
Representing Poland
European Championships
Bronze medal – third place	2012 Helsinki	110 m hurdles
European Team Championships
Silver medal – second place	2010 Bergen	110 m hurdles
Bronze medal – third place	2013 Gateshead	110 m hurdles
World Junior Championships
Gold medal – first place	2006 Beijing	110 m hurdles
European Junior Championships
Gold medal – first place	2007 Hengelo	110 m hurdles
European U23 Championships
Gold medal – first place	2009 Kaunas	100 m hurdles

Artur Noga (born 2 May 1988 in Racibórz) is a Polish athlete. He mainly competes in the 110 metres hurdles. He finished 5th at the 2008 Summer Olympics in a time of 13.36s.

In 2006, he won a gold medal at the World Junior Championships in Beijing at 110 metres hurdles. His winning time of 13.26s was a Championship record.

His 110 metres hurdles personal best of 13.26, set in 2013, is the standing national record.

== Achievements ==
=== Personal bests ===
Event	Time (seconds)	Venue	Date
60 metres hurdles	7.64	Warsaw, Poland	10 February 2008
110 metres hurdles	13.26	Warsaw, Poland	26 August 2013

== Competition record ==
Year	Competition	Venue	Position	Event	Notes
Representing Poland
2006	World Junior Championships	Beijing, China	1st	110m hurdles (99 cm)	13.23 (+1.5 m/s) (EJR)
2007	European Junior Championships	Hengelo, Netherlands	1st	110m hurdles (99 cm)	13.36 (CR)
2008	Olympic Games	Beijing, China	5th	110 m hurdles	13.36
2009	European U23 Championships	Kaunas, Lithuania	1st	110m hurdles	13.47
2009	World Championships	Berlin, Germany	9th (sf)	110m hurdles	13.43
2010	European Championships	Barcelona, Spain	5th	110m hurdles	13.44
2012	World Indoor Championships	Istanbul, Turkey	8th	60m hurdles	7.74
2012	European Championships	Helsinki, Finland	3rd	110m hurdles	13.27 (=NR)
2012	Olympic Games	London, United Kingdom	–	110 m hurdles	DNF
2013	World Championships	Moscow, Russia	7th (sf)	110 m hurdles	13.35
2014	European Championships	Zürich, Switzerland	6th	110 m hurdles	14.25
2015	World Championships	Beijing, China	12th (sf)	110 m hurdles	13.37
2018	European Championships	Berlin, Germany	19th (sf)	110 m hurdles	13.66
2021	European Indoor Championships	Toruń, Poland	16th (sf)	60 m hurdles	7.76

Records
Preceded by Arthur Blake	Men's World Junior Record Holder, 110 metres hurdles 20 August 2006 – 31 July 2009	Succeeded by Wayne Davis
