= Erik Balnuweit =

German hurdler

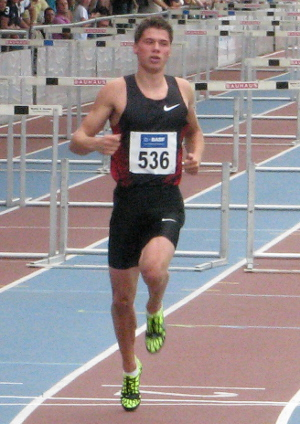
- Balnuweit in 2011

Personal information
- Born: 21 September 1988 (age 37) Gera, Germany
- Height: 189 cm (6 ft 2 in)
- Weight: 80 kg (176 lb)

Sport
- Country: Germany
- Sport: Athletics
- Events: 110 metres hurdles, 60 metres hurdles
- Club: LAZ Leipzig

Erik Balnuweit (born 21 September 1988 in Gera) is a German hurdler. He competed in the 110 m hurdles event at the 2012 Summer Olympics failing to reach the semifinals.

He has personal bests of 13.44 in the 110 metres hurdles (2013) and 7.54 in the indoor 60 metres hurdles (2014).

== Competition record ==
Year	Competition	Venue	Position	Event	Notes
Representing Germany
2006	World Junior Championships	Beijing, China	17th (sf)	110 m hurdles (99 cm)	14.12 (-1.3 m/s)
2007	European Junior Championships	Hengelo, Netherlands	6th	110 m hurdles (99 cm)	13.92
2009	European Indoor Championships	Turin, Italy	13th (sf)	60 m hurdles	7.79
2009	European U23 Championships	Kaunas, Lithuania	11th (h)	110 m hurdles	13.85 (+0.9 m/s)
2011	World Championships	Daegu, South Korea	17th (h)	110 m hurdles	13.56
2012	Olympic Games	London, United Kingdom	36th (h)	110 m hurdles	13.77
2013	European Indoor Championships	Gothenburg, Sweden	5th	60 m hurdles	7.58
2013	Universiade	Kazan, Russia	4th	110 m hurdles	13.61
2013	World Championships	Moscow, Russia	24th (h)	110 m hurdles	13.68
2014	World Indoor Championships	Sopot, Poland	6th	60 m hurdles	7.56
2014	European Championships	Zürich, Switzerland	10th (sf)	110 m hurdles	13.49
2015	European Indoor Championships	Prague, Czech Republic	4th	60 m hurdles	7.59
2017	European Indoor Championships	Belgrade, Serbia	9th (h)	60 m hurdles	7.67
2018	World Indoor Championships	Birmingham, United Kingdom	17th (sf)	60 m hurdles	7.70
2018	European Championships	Berlin, Germany	16th (sf)	110 m hurdles	13.59
2021	European Indoor Championships	Toruń, Poland	12th (sf)	60 m hurdles	7.74
