= Balázs Baji =

Hungarian hurdler (born 1989)

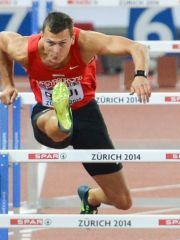
- Baji in 2014

Personal information
- Nationality: Hungarian
- Born: 9 June 1989 (age 37) Békéscsaba, Hungary
- Height: 1.92 m (6 ft 4 in)
- Weight: 83 kg (183 lb)

Sport
- Country: Hungary
- Sport: Sprint hurdling
- Club: Békéscsabai AC (–2017); Bp. Honvéd (2018–)
- Coached by: János Medovarszki; István Tomhauser
Medal record
Representing Hungary
World Championships
Bronze medal – third place	2017 London	110 m hurdles
European Championships
Silver medal – second place	2016 Amsterdam	110 m hurdles
European U23 Championships
Silver medal – second place	2011 Ostrava	110 m hurdles
Universiade
Gold medal – first place	2017 Taipei	110 m hurdles

Balázs Baji (Hungarian pronunciation: [ˈbɒlaːʒ ˈbɒji]; born 9 June 1989) is a Hungarian track and field athlete who specializes in the 60 metres hurdles and 110 metres hurdles.

== Career ==
Among his best results in 110 metres hurdles are a seventh place from the 2008 World Junior Championships, a sixth place from the 2011 Summer Universiade and a silver medal from the 2011 European U23 Championships which he achieved with a new Hungarian U23 record.

For his performances he was named the best U23 male athlete in Hungary in 2011.

In his senior career, he has won the silver medal at the 2016 European Championships and the bronze medal at the 2017 World Championships.

== Competition record ==
Year	Competition	Venue	Position	Event	Notes
Representing Hungary
2007	European Junior Championships	Hengelo, Netherlands	10th (sf)	110 m hurdles (99 cm)	13.80
2008	World Junior Championships	Bydgoszcz, Poland	7th	110 m hurdles (99 cm)	13.60 (+1.1 m/s)
2009	European Indoor Championships	Turin, Italy	20th (h)	60 m hurdles	7.94
2009	European U23 Championships	Kaunas, Lithuania	14th (h)	110 m hurdles	13.96
2010	European Championships	Helsinki, Finland	25th (h)	110 m hurdles	14.01
2011	European Indoor Championships	Paris, France	13th (h)	60 m hurdles	7.77
2011	European U23 Championships	Ostrava, Czech Republic	2nd	110 m hurdles	13.58
2011	Universiade	Shenzhen, China	6th	110 m hurdles	13.71
2011	World Championships	Daegu, South Korea	30th (h)	110 m hurdles	14.06
2012	World Indoor Championships	Istanbul, Turkey	12th (sf)	60 m hurdles	7.76
2012	European Championships	Helsinki, Finland	17th (sf)	110 m hurdles	13.68
2012	Olympic Games	London, United Kingdom	34th (h)	110 m hurdles	13.76
2013	European Indoor Championships	Gothenburg, Sweden	4th	60 m hurdles	7.56
2013	World Championships	Moscow, Russia	12th (sf)	110 m hurdles	13.49
2014	World Indoor Championships	Sopot, Poland	10th (sf)	60 m hurdles	7.63
2014	European Championships	Zürich, Switzerland	4th	110 m hurdles	13.29
2015	European Indoor Championships	Prague, Czech Republic	7th	60 m hurdles	7.65
2015	World Championships	Beijing, China	19th (sf)	110m hurdles	13.51
2016	World Indoor Championships	Portland, United States	6th	60 m hurdles	7.65
2016	European Championships	Amsterdam, Netherlands	2nd	110 m hurdles	13.28
2016	Olympic Games	Rio de Janeiro, Brazil	15th (sf)	110 m hurdles	13.52
2017	European Indoor Championships	Belgrade, Serbia	—	60 m hurdles	DSQ
2017	World Championships	London, United Kingdom	3rd	110m hurdles	13.28
2017	Universiade	Taipei, Taiwan	1st	110 m hurdles	13.35
2018	World Indoor Championships	Birmingham, United Kingdom	10th (sf)	60 m hurdles	7.64
2018	European Championships	Berlin, Germany	8th	110 m hurdles	13.55
2021	European Indoor Championships	Toruń, Poland	10th (sf)	60 m hurdles	7.73

== Personal bests ==
As of 7 August 2017

Event	Time (seconds)	Wind	Venue	Date
60 metres hurdles	7.53	–	Budapest, Hungary	19 February 2017
110 metres hurdles	13.15	0.3	Székesfehérvár, Hungary	4 July 2017

== Awards ==
- Hungarian athlete of the Year (1): 2016

Awards
Preceded by Áron Szilágyi	Hungarian Sportsman of The Year; 2017	Succeeded by Shaolin Sándor Liu
