= Martin Mazáč =

Czech hurdler

Personal information
- Born: 6 May 1990
- Education: University of Economics and Management, Prague
- Height: 1.89 m (6 ft 2 in)
- Weight: 81 kg (179 lb)

Sport
- Sport: Athletics
- Event: 110 m hurdles
- Club: PSK Olymp Praha
- Coached by: Ludvík Svoboda

Martin Mazáč (born 6 May 1990) is a retired Czech athlete who specialised in the sprint hurdles. He represented his country at the 2010 and 2014 World Indoor Championships, as well as the 2013 World Championships, without advancing from the first round.

His personal bests are 13.48 seconds in the 110 metres hurdles (+0.4 m/s, Tábor 2013) and 7.64 seconds in the 60 metres hurdles (Prague 2014).

== International competitions ==
Year	Competition	Venue	Position	Event	Notes
Representing the Czech Republic
2008	World Junior Championships	Bydgoszcz, Poland	21st (sf)	110 m hurdles (99 cm)	14.19
2009	European Junior Championships	Novi Sad, Serbia	–	110 m hurdles (99 cm)	DNF
2010	World Indoor Championships	Doha, Qatar	24th (h)	60 m hurdles	7.97
2010	European Championships	Barcelona, Spain	20th (h)	110 m hurdles	13.87
2011	European U23 Championships	Ostrava, Czech Republic	6th	110 m hurdles	13.81
2011	Universiade	Shenzhen, China	19th (sf)	110 m hurdles	14.25
2013	European Indoor Championships	Gothenburg, Sweden	21st (h)	60 m hurdles	7.86
2013	Universiade	Kazan, Russia	6th	110 m hurdles	13.83
2013	World Championships	Moscow, Russia	17th (h)	110 m hurdles	13.52
2014	World Indoor Championships	Sopot, Poland	23rd (h)	60 m hurdles	7.90
2015	European Indoor Championships	Prague, Czech Republic	23rd (h)	60 m hurdles	7.90
