= 2013 World Championships in Athletics – Men's 110 metres hurdles =

Men's 110 metres hurdles at the 2013 World Championships
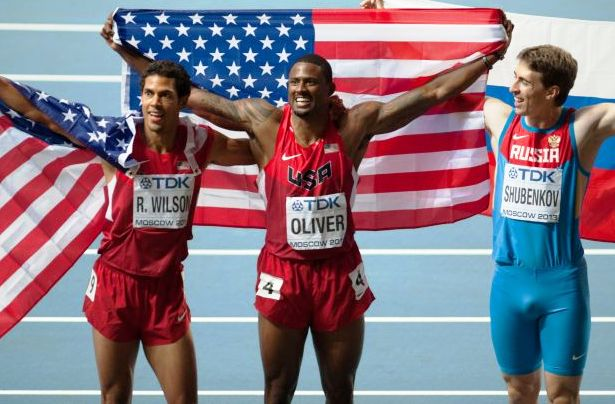
- Top 3 athletes
- Venue: Luzhniki Stadium
- Dates: 11 August (heats); 12 August (semifinals & final)
- Competitors: 33 from 23 nations
- Winning time: 13.00

Medalists
gold medal	David Oliver; United States
silver medal	Ryan Wilson; United States
bronze medal	Sergey Shubenkov; Russia

The men's 110 metres hurdles at the 2013 World Championships in Athletics was held at the Luzhniki Stadium on 11 and 12 August.

== Records ==
Prior to the competition, the records were as follows:

World record	Aries Merritt (USA)	12.80	Brussels, Belgium	7 September 2012
Championship record	Colin Jackson (GBR)	12.91	Stuttgart, Germany	20 August 1993
World Leading	David Oliver (USA)	13.03	Lausanne, Switzerland	4 July 2013
African Record	Lehann Fourie (RSA)	13.24	Brussels, Belgium	7 September 2012
Asian Record	Liu Xiang (CHN)	12.88	Lausanne, Switzerland	11 July 2006
North, Central American and Caribbean record	Aries Merritt (USA)	12.80	Brussels, Belgium	7 September 2012
South American Record	Paulo Villar (COL)	13.27A	Guadalajara, Mexico	28 October 2011
European Record	Colin Jackson (GBR)	12.91	Stuttgart, Germany	20 August 1993
Oceanian record	Kyle Vander Kuyp (AUS)	13.29	Gothenburg, Sweden	11 August 1995

== Qualification standards ==
A time	B time
13.40	13.50

== Schedule ==
Date	Time	Round
11 August 2013	09:40	Heats
12 August 2013	19:05	Semifinals
12 August 2013	21:30	Final

== Results ==
KEY:	q	Fastest non-qualifiers	Q	Qualified	NR	National record	PB	Personal best	SB	Seasonal best

=== Heats ===
Heats were held on 11 August.

Wind:
Heat 1: +0.5 m/, Heat 2: -0.3 m/, Heat 3: +0.5 m/, Heat 4: -0.6 m/

Qualification: First 3 in each heat (Q) and the next 3 fastest (q) advanced to the semifinals.

Rank	Heat	Lane	Name	Nationality	Time	Notes
1	4	5	David Oliver	United States	13.05	Q
2	4	2	Sergey Shubenkov	Russia	13.16	Q, SB
3	4	6	Andrew Riley	Jamaica	13.27	Q
4	3	3	Aries Merritt	United States	13.32	Q
5	1	3	Jason Richardson	United States	13.33	Q
5	3	8	Thomas Martinot-Lagarde	France	13.33	Q
7	3	6	Balázs Baji	Hungary	13.36	Q, PB
8	2	8	Ryan Wilson	United States	13.37	Q
9	1	8	Konstantin Shabanov	Russia	13.38	Q, SB
9	2	6	Wayne Davis II	Trinidad and Tobago	13.38	Q, SB
11	1	7	Ryan Brathwaite	Barbados	13.40	Q
12	1	2	Mikel Thomas	Trinidad and Tobago	13.41	q
13	1	4	Hansle Parchment	Jamaica	13.43	q
14	4	3	Artur Noga	Poland	13.44	q
15	3	7	Gregory Sedoc	Netherlands	13.50	q, SB
16	2	9	William Sharman	Great Britain & N.I.	13.51	Q
17	1	1	Martin Mazác	Czech Republic	13.52	
17	1	5	Eddie Lovett	U.S. Virgin Islands	13.52	
19	4	4	Konstadinos Douvalidis	Greece	13.55	
20	4	1	Ignacio Morales	Cuba	13.59	
21	2	3	Xie Wenjun	China	13.59	
22	2	2	Pascal Martinot-Lagarde	France	13.63	
23	2	7	Philip Nossmy	Sweden	13.66	
24	3	5	Erik Balnuweit	Germany	13.68	
25	3	4	Orlando Ortega	Cuba	13.69	
26	1	9	Jiang Fan	China	13.87	
27	4	9	Greggmar Swift	Barbados	13.79	
28	2	5	Jorge McFarlane	Peru	13.93	
29	4	7	Rayzam Shah Wan Sofian	Malaysia	14.45	
30	3	9	Othmane Hadj Lazib	Algeria	14.51	
31	4	8	Lac Jamras Rittidet	Thailand	14.71	
32	1	6	Iong Kim Fai	Macau	15.10	
33	2	4	Xaysa Anousone	Laos	16.21	SB
	3	2	Dwight Thomas	Jamaica	DNS	

=== Semifinals ===
Qualification: First 3 in each heat (Q) and the next 2 fastest (q) advanced to the final.

Wind: Heat 1: −0.3 m/s, Heat 2: −0.3 m/s.

Rank	Heat	Lane	Name	Nationality	Time	Notes
1	2	7	Sergey Shubenkov	Russia	13.17	Q
2	2	4	David Oliver	United States	13.18	Q
3	2	6	Ryan Wilson	United States	13.20	Q
4	2	9	Andrew Riley	Jamaica	13.30	q
5	1	5	Jason Richardson	United States	13.34	Q
5	2	8	William Sharman	Great Britain & N.I.	13.34	q
7	2	2	Artur Noga	Poland	13.35	
8	1	6	Thomas Martinot-Lagarde	France	13.39	Q
9	1	7	Aries Merritt	United States	13.44	Q
10	1	3	Mikel Thomas	Trinidad and Tobago	13.46	
11	2	5	Wayne Davis II	Trinidad and Tobago	13.47	
12	1	9	Balázs Baji	Hungary	13.49	
13	2	3	Gregory Sedoc	Netherlands	13.54	
14	1	8	Ryan Brathwaite	Barbados	13.64	
	1	2	Hansle Parchment	Jamaica	DNF	
	1	4	Konstantin Shabanov	Russia	DNF	

=== Final ===
Wind: +0.3 m/s.

Rank	Lane	Name	Nationality	Time	Notes
1st place, gold medalist(s)	4	David Oliver	United States	13.00	WL
2nd place, silver medalist(s)	9	Ryan Wilson	United States	13.13	
3rd place, bronze medalist(s)	5	Sergey Shubenkov	Russia	13.24	
4	7	Jason Richardson	United States	13.27	
5	2	William Sharman	Great Britain & N.I.	13.30	
6	8	Aries Merritt	United States	13.31	
7	6	Thomas Martinot-Lagarde	France	13.42	
8	3	Andrew Riley	Jamaica	13.51	
