= Jackson Quiñónez =

Spanish hurdler and politician (born 1980)

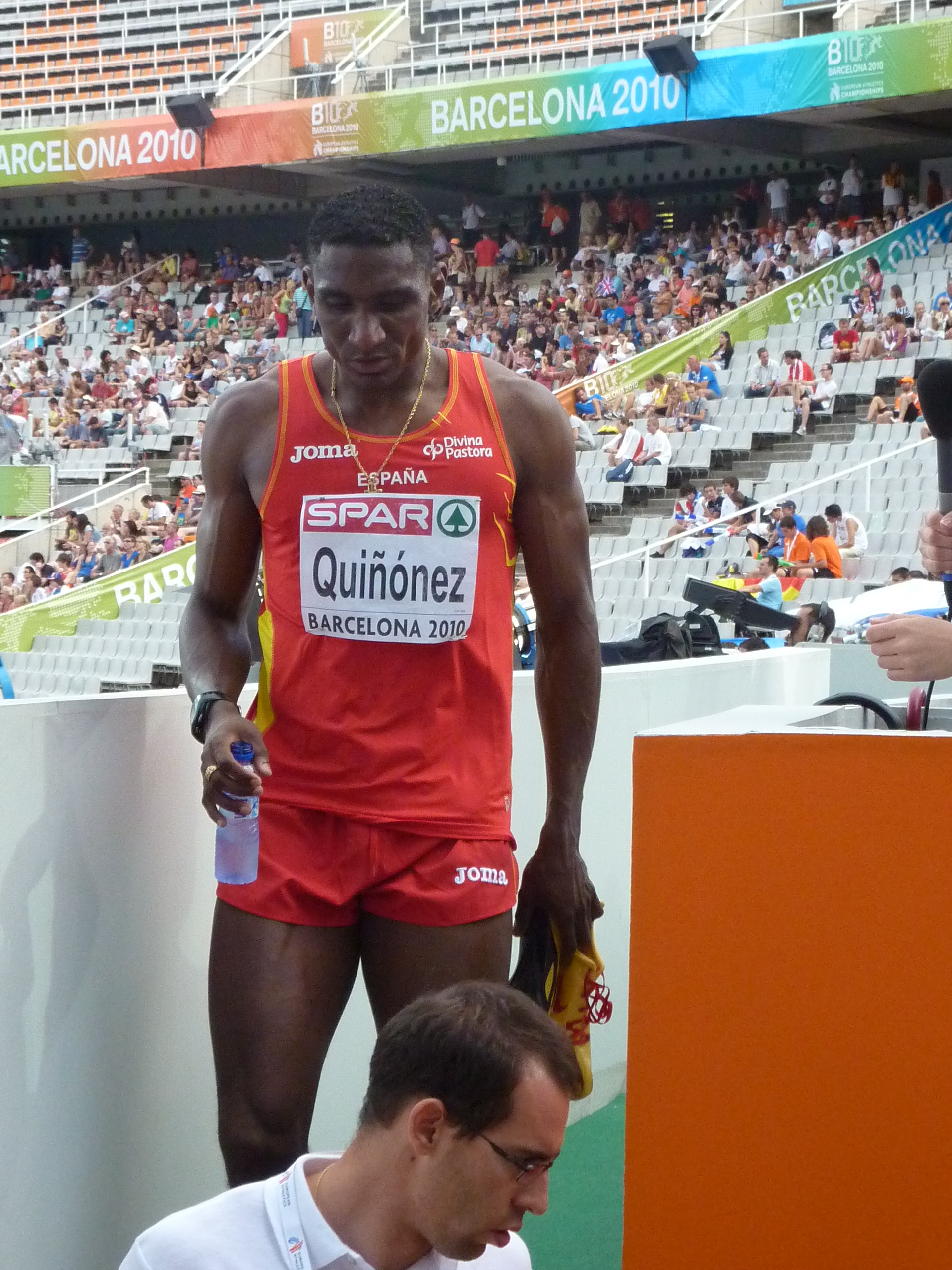
- Quiñónez in 2010

Personal information
- Full name: Jackson Quiñónez Vernaza
- Born: 12 June 1980 (age 46) Esmeraldas, Esmeraldas, Ecuador
- Height: 1.90 m (6 ft 3 in)
- Weight: 91 kg (201 lb)

Sport
- Sport: Athletics
Medal record
Men's Athletics
Representing Spain
European Indoor Championships
Bronze medal – third place	2007 Birmingham	60 m hurdles
Mediterranean Games
Gold medal – first place	2009 Pescara	110 m hurdles
Representing Ecuador
South American Games
Gold medal – first place	1998 Cuenca	4x100 m relay
Silver medal – second place	1998 Cuenca	110 m hurdles
Silver medal – second place	1998 Cuenca	High jump
Bolivarian Games
Silver medal – second place	2001 Ambato	High jump
Silver medal – second place	2001 Ambato	110 m hurdles
Silver medal – second place	2005 Armenia	110 m hurdles

Jackson Quiñónez Vernaza (born 12 June 1980) is a politician and former hurdler. Born in Ecuador, he represented his country of birth and Spain internationally.

== Career ==
He won the bronze medal in 60 metres hurdles for his new country at the 2007 European Indoor Championships. For Ecuador he competed at the World Championships in 2003 and 2005 as well as the 2004 Olympic Games without reaching the final round.

His personal best time is 13.34 seconds, achieved in July 2006 in Zaragoza. This is the current Spanish record. He still holds the Ecuadorian records in 110 metres hurdles with 13.44 seconds, and in the indoor high jump with 2.10 metres.

== Competition record ==
Year	Competition	Venue	Position	Event	Notes
Representing Ecuador
1996	South American Youth Championships	Asunción, Paraguay	1st	300 m hurdles	38.1 s
1998	South American Junior Championships	Córdoba, Argentina	3rd	110 m hurdles	14.78 s
1998	South American Games	Cuenca, Ecuador	2nd	110 m hurdles	14.58 s
1998	South American Games	Cuenca, Ecuador	1st	4 × 100 m relay	40.40 s A
1998	South American Games	Cuenca, Ecuador	2nd	High jump	2.13 m
1999	South American Championships	Bogotá, Colombia	5th	110 m hurdles	14.67 s
1999	South American Championships	Bogotá, Colombia	6th	4 × 100 m relay	41.00 s
1999	South American Championships	Bogotá, Colombia	5th	4 × 400 m relay	3:13.52 min
1999	South American Championships	Bogotá, Colombia	7th	High jump	2.05 m
1999	Pan American Games	Winnipeg, Canada	13th (h)	110 m hurdles	14.28 s
1999	Pan American Games	Winnipeg, Canada	12th	High jump	2.00 m
1999	South American Junior Championships	Concepción, Chile	1st	110 m hurdles	14.26 s
1999	South American Junior Championships	Concepción, Chile	2nd	High jump	2.06 m
2000	Ibero-American Championships	Rio de Janeiro, Brazil	3rd	110 m hurdles	14.66 s
2000	Ibero-American Championships	Rio de Janeiro, Brazil	7th	High jump	2.05 m
2001	South American Championships	Manaus, Brazil	4th	110 m hurdles	13.94 s
2001	South American Championships	Manaus, Brazil	4th	4 × 100 m relay	41.71 s
2001	Bolivarian Games	Ambato, Ecuador	2nd	110 m hurdles	13.64 s A
2001	Bolivarian Games	Ambato, Ecuador	3rd	4 × 100 m relay	40.80 s
2001	Bolivarian Games	Ambato, Ecuador	2nd	High jump	2.20 m A
2003	South American Championships	Barquisimeto, Venezuela	2nd	110 m hurdles	13.59 s
2003	Pan American Games	Santo Domingo, Dominican Republic	6th	110 m hurdles	13.64 s
2003	World Championships	Paris, France	17th (sf)	110 m hurdles	13.72 s
2004	Ibero-American Championships	Huelva, Spain	3rd	110 m hurdles	13.61 s
2004	Olympic Games	Athens, Greece	25th (qf)	110 m hurdles	13.67 s
2005	World Championships	Helsinki, Finland	34th (h)	110 m hurdles	14.34 s
2005	Bolivarian Games	Armenia, Colombia	2nd	110 m hurdles	13.53 s A
Representing Spain
2007	European Indoor Championships	Birmingham, United Kingdom	3rd	60 m hurdles	7.65 s
2007	World Championships	Osaka, Japan	7th	110 m hurdles	13.33 s (NR)
2008	World Indoor Championships	Valencia, Spain	7th	60 m hurdles	7.66 s
2008	Olympic Games	Beijing, China	8th	110 m hurdles	13.69 s
2009	European Indoor Championships	Turin, Italy	8th (sf)	60 m hurdles	7.71 s
2009	Mediterranean Games	Pescara, Italy	1st	110 m hurdles	13.60 s
2009	World Championships	Berlin, Germany	18th (sf)	110 m hurdles	13.54 s
2010	Ibero-American Championships	San Fernando, Spain	2nd	110 m hurdles	13.65 s
2010	European Championships	Barcelona, Spain	13th (sf)	110 m hurdles	14.03 s
2011	European Indoor Championships	Paris, France	9th (sf)	60 m hurdles	7.70 s
2012	World Indoor Championships	Istanbul, Turkey	14th (sf)	60 m hurdles	7.82 s
2012	European Championships	Helsinki, Finland	24th (h)	110 m hurdles	13.97 s
2012	Olympic Games	London, United Kingdom	34th (h)	110 m hurdles	13.76 s
2013	European Indoor Championships	Gothenburg, Sweden	11th (sf)	60 m hurdles	7.72 s
2014	World Indoor Championships	Sopot, Poland	20th (h)	60 m hurdles	7.78 s
