= Athletics at the 2013 Summer Universiade – Men's 110 metres hurdles =

The men's 110 metres hurdles event at the 2013 Summer Universiade was held on 11 July.

== Medalists ==
Gold	Silver	Bronze
Eddie Lovett; United States Virgin Islands	Konstantin Shabanov; Russia	Sergey Shubenkov; Russia

== Results ==
=== Heats ===
Qualification: First 2 in each heat (Q) and the next 2 best performers (q) qualified for the final.

Wind:
Heat 1: +2.2 m/s, Heat 2: +1.4 m/s, Heat 3: +0.7 m/s

Rank	Heat	Name	Nationality	Time	Notes
1	1	Sergey Shubenkov	Russia	13.10	Q
2	2	Konstantin Shabanov	Russia	13.51	Q, SB
3	2	Eddie Lovett	United States Virgin Islands	13.53	Q
4	3	Erik Balnuweit	Germany	13.60	Q
5	1	Francisco Javier López	Spain	13.62	Q
6	2	Martin Mazáč	Czech Republic	13.64	q
7	3	Greggmar Swift	Barbados	13.75	Q
8	3	Lyu Anye	China	13.76	q
9	1	Tobias Furer	Switzerland	13.87	
10	1	Alexander Brorsson	Sweden	13.97	
11	1	Hideki Omuro	Japan	13.97	
12	3	Tjendo Samuel	Netherlands	13.99	PB
13	2	Agustín Carrera	Argentina	14.00	SB
14	2	Ahmad Hazer	Lebanon	14.11	
15	3	Matthew Brisson	Canada	14.16	
16	3	Cristian Alzate	Colombia	14.44	
17	1	Kārlis Daube	Latvia	14.81	
18	2	Wilson Yeboah	Ghana	14.95	
19	1	Iong Kim Fai	Macau	15.19	
20	3	Lankantien Lamboni	Togo	15.42	
	2	Samuel Bangura	Sierra Leone	DNS	

=== Final ===
Wind: +1.7 m/s

Rank	Lane	Name	Nationality	Time	Notes
1st place, gold medalist(s)	4	Eddie Lovett	United States Virgin Islands	13.43	
2nd place, silver medalist(s)	3	Konstantin Shabanov	Russia	13.46	SB
3rd place, bronze medalist(s)	5	Sergey Shubenkov	Russia	13.47	
4	6	Erik Balnuweit	Germany	13.61	
5	8	Francisco Javier López	Spain	13.78	
6	1	Martin Mazáč	Czech Republic	13.83	
7	2	Lyu Anye	China	13.97	
	7	Greggmar Swift	Barbados	DNF	
