= João Carlos Almeida =

Portuguese hurdler (born 1988)

Personal information
- Nationality: Portuguese
- Born: 5 April 1988 (age 38)

Sport
- Sport: Track and field
- Events: 60 metres hurdles and 110 metres hurdles

Achievements and titles
- Personal bests: Outdoor: 110 m hurdles: 13.47 (2012) Indoor: 60 m hurdles: 7.66 (2015)
Medal record
Men's Athletics
Representing Portugal
European Youth Olympic Festival
Silver medal – second place	2005 Lignano Sabbiadoro	110 m hurdles

João Carlos Almeida (born 5 April 1988 in Lisbon) is a Portuguese track and field athlete who competes in the 110 metres hurdles. He competed in the event at the 2012 Summer Olympics, where he was eliminated in the first round after finishing sixth in his heat. In the same year he broke a national (Portuguese) record.

== Competition record ==
Year	Competition	Venue	Position	Event	Notes
Representing Portugal
2005	European Youth Olympic Festival	Lignano Sabbiadoro, Italy	2nd	110 m hurdles	13.94
2007	European Junior Championships	Kaunas, Lithuania	4th	110 m hurdles (99 cm)	13.80
2011	Universiade	Shenzhen, China	12th (sf)	110 m hurdles	13.95
2012	European Championships	Helsinki, Finland	12th (sf)	110 m hurdles	13.56
2012	Olympic Games	London, United Kingdom	31st (h)	110 m hurdles	13.69
2014	European Championships	Zürich, Switzerland	18th (h)	110 m hurdles	13.58
2015	European Indoor Championships	Prague, Czech Republic	11th (sf)	60 m hurdles	7.68
