= Gregor Traber =

German hurdler (born 1992)

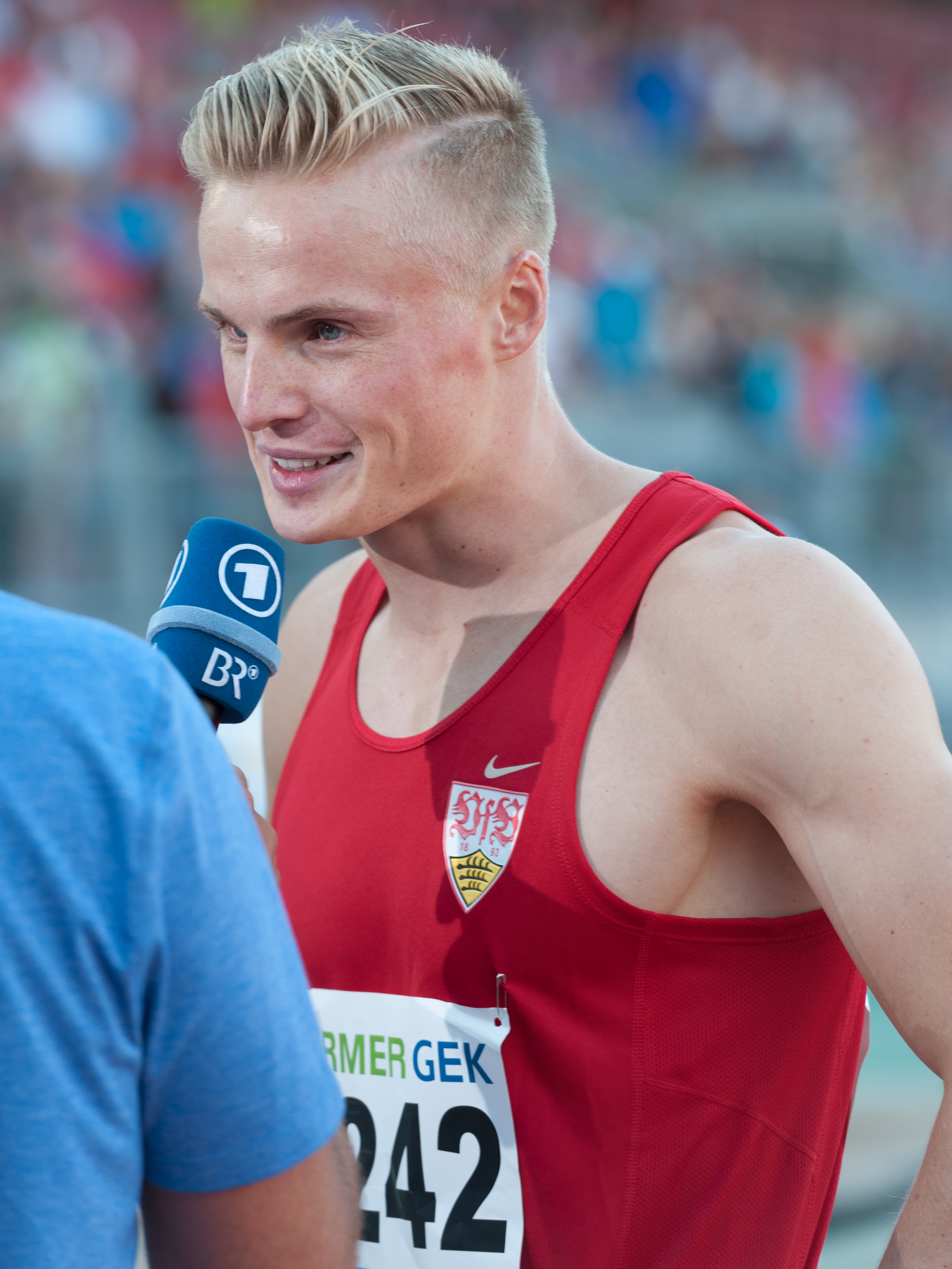
- Gregor Traber 2015

Personal information
- Born: 2 December 1992 (age 33)
- Height: 1.90 m (6 ft 3 in)
- Weight: 80 kg (176 lb)

Sport
- Sport: Athletics
- Events: 110 m hurdles, 60 m hurdles

Gregor Traber (born 2 December 1992, in Tettnang) is a German athlete specialising in the sprint hurdles events. He finished fifth in the 60 metres hurdles at the 2014 World Indoor Championships.

His personal bests are 13.47 seconds in the 110 metres hurdles (Geneva 2012) and 7.56 in the 60 metres hurdles (Sopot 2014).

== Competition record ==
Year	Competition	Venue	Position	Event	Notes
Representing Germany
2009	World Youth Championships	Brixen, Italy	5th	110 m hurdles (91.4 cm)	13.74
2009	World Youth Championships	Brixen, Italy	7th	Triple jump	15.24 m
2010	World Junior Championships	Moncton, Canada	14th (sf)	110 m hurdles (99 cm)	13.92 (+0.4 m/s)
2012	World Indoor Championships	Istanbul, Turkey	16th (h)	60 m hurdles	7.83
2012	European Championships	Helsinki, Finland	15th (sf)	110 m hurdles	13.62
2013	European U23 Championships	Tampere, Finland	3rd	110 m hurdles	13.66 (-0.4 m/s)
2014	World Indoor Championships	Sopot, Poland	5th	60 m hurdles	7.56
2014	European Championships	Zürich, Switzerland	12th (sf)	110 m hurdles	13.56
2015	World Championships	Beijing, China	12th (sf)	110 m hurdles	13.37
2016	European Championships	Amsterdam, Netherlands	18th (sf)	110 m hurdles	13.66
2016	Olympic Games	Rio de Janeiro, Brazil	9th (sf)	110 m hurdles	13.43
2018	European Championships	Berlin, Germany	5th	110 m hurdles	13.46
2021	Olympic Games	Tokyo, Japan	30th (h)	110 m hurdles	13.65
2022	World Indoor Championships	Belgrade, Serbia	18th (sf)	60 m hurdles	7.67
2022	World Championships	Eugene, United States	32nd (h)	110 m hurdles	13.81
2022	European Championships	Munich, Germany	16th (sf)	110 m hurdles	13.72
