= Hassane Fofana =

Italian hurdler (born 1992)

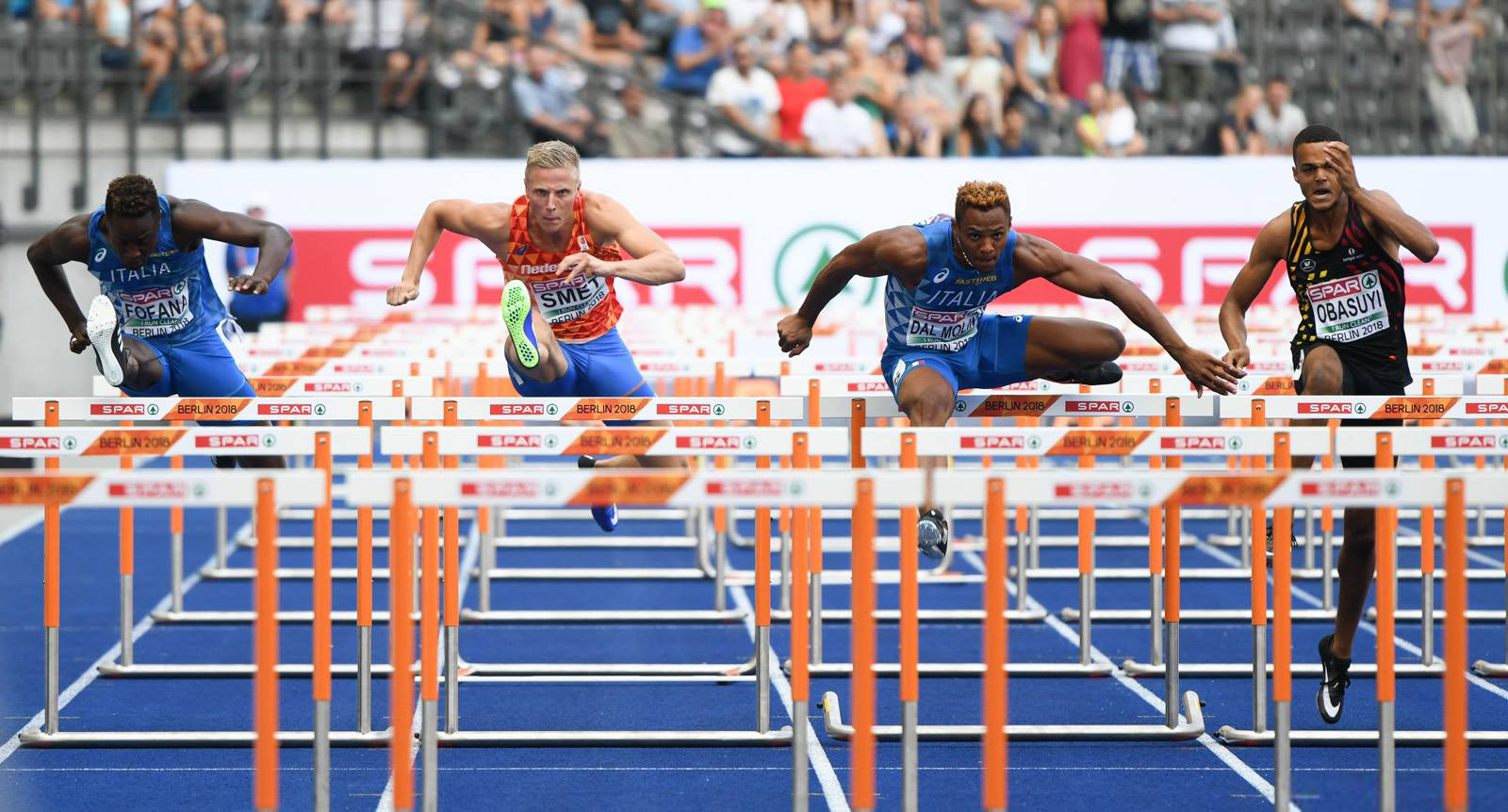
- Hassane Fofana (first from left)

Personal information
- Born: 28 April 1992 (age 34) Gavardo, Italy
- Height: 1.84 m (6 ft 0 in)
- Weight: 78 kg (172 lb)

Sport
- Sport: Athletics
- Events: 110 m hurdles, 60 m hurdles
- Club: G.S. Fiamme Oro Padova (2012–)
- Coached by: Alberto Barbera

Achievements and titles
- Personal best: 110 m hs: 13.44 (2019)
Medal record
Men's athletics
Representing Italy
European Games
Gold medal – first place	2019 Minsk	110 m hurdles

Hassane Fofana (born 28 April 1992) is an Italian athlete specialising in the high hurdles. He is of Ivorian descent. He competed at the 2020 Summer Olympics, in 110 m hurdles.

== Biography ==
His personal bests are 13.44 seconds in the 110 metres hurdles (+1.5 m/s, Turku 2019, and also +1.1, Geneva 2021) and 7.66 seconds in the 60 metres hurdles (Ancona 2018). he won six times the national championships.

== Achievements ==
Year	Competition	Venue	Position	Event	Notes
Representing Italy
2013	European U23 Championships	Tampere, Finland	9th (h)	110 m hurdles	14.05
2014	European Championships	Zürich, Switzerland	17th (h)	110 m hurdles	13.55
2015	European Indoor Championships	Prague, Czech Republic	15th (h)	60 m hurdles	7.75
2016	European Championships	Amsterdam, Netherlands	12th (sf)	110 m hurdles	13.52
2017	European Indoor Championships	Belgrade, Serbia	14th (h)	60 m hurdles	7.78
2018	World Indoor Championships	Birmingham, United Kingdom	25th (h)	60 m hurdles	7.81
2018	Mediterranean Games	Tarragona, Spain	6th	110 m hurdles	13.89
2018	European Championships	Berlin, Germany	11th (sf)	110 m hurdles	13.52
2019	World Championships	Doha, Qatar	12th (sf)	110 m hurdles	13.52
2021	European Indoor Championships	Toruń, Poland	15th (sf)	60 m hurdles	7.75
2021	Olympic Games	Tokyo, Japan	32nd (h)	110 m hurdles	13.70
2022	World Indoor Championships	Belgrade, Serbia	16th (sf)	60 m hurdles	7.65
2022	European Championships	Munich, Germany	10th (sf)	110 m hurdles	13.56
2023	European Indoor Championships	Istanbul, Turkey	8th (sf)	60 m hurdles	7.71
2023	World Championships	Budapest, Hungary	17th (sf)	110 m hurdles	13.50
2024	European Championships	Rome, Italy	15th (sf)	110 m hurdles	13.70
2025	European Indoor Championships	Apeldoorn, Netherlands	24th (h)	60 m hurdles	7.80

== National titles ==
- Italian Athletics Championships
  - 110 metres hurdles: 2013, 2014, 2015, 2016, 2019, 2022
- Italian Athletics Indoor Championships
  - 110 metres hurdles: 2015, 2017, 2018

== See also ==
- Italian all-time lists - 110 metres hurdles
