= Dominic Berger =

American track and field athlete

Personal information
- Born: 19 May 1986 (age 39) Maryland, United States

Sport
- Sport: Track and field

Dominic Berger (born 19 May 1986) is an American track and field athlete who competes in the sprint hurdles.

== College career ==
At the University of Maryland he was a multiple time All-American and Atlantic Coast Conference champion.

== International career ==
Berger won the 110 metres hurdles at the 2006 NACAC Under-23 Championships in Athletics.

At the 2014 USA Indoor Track and Field Championships Berger finished 2nd with a time of 7.556 second which was 0.003 seconds out of first and 0.003 seconds above third. This finished enabled him to compete at the 2014 IAAF World Indoor Championships where he was a semifinalist.
