= Karl Jennings =

Canadian hurdler (born 1979)

Personal information
- Born: May 14, 1979 (age 46) Toronto, Canada

Sport
- Sport: Track and field

Karl Anthony Jennings (born May 14, 1979 in Toronto, Ontario) is a Canadian hurdler, specializing in the 110 metres hurdles. He has also run the 440 metre, 60 metre, and 55 metre events. Jennings graduated from high school in Scotch Plains, New Jersey and attended the University of Tennessee, where he earned his BA in Psychology.

Jennings is a four-time Canadian National Champion in the 110 metre hurdles (2005, 2008, 2009, 2010). He was a member of the Canadian 2003 Pan American Athletics team in Santo Domingo, Dominican Republic and the Canadian 2005 World Championship team in Helsinki, Finland.
