= Lorenzo Perini =

Italian hurdler (born 1994)

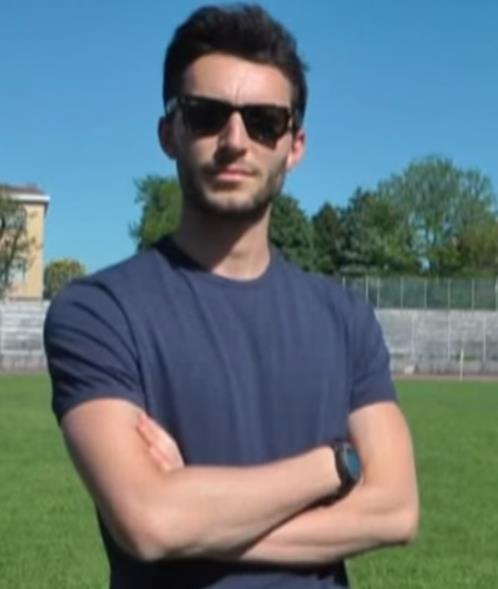
- Perini in 2014.

Personal information
- Nationality: Italian
- Born: 22 July 1994 (age 31) Milan, Italy
- Height: 1.70 m (5 ft 7 in)
- Weight: 60 kg (132 lb)

Sport
- Country: Italy
- Sport: Athletics
- Event: 110 metres hurdles
- Club: C.S. Aeronautica Militare

Achievements and titles
- Personal bests: 110 m hs: 13.46 (2019); 60 m hs: 7.66 (2019)
Medal record
Mediterranean Games
Gold medal – first place	2018 Tarragona	110 m hs
European U23 Championships
Bronze medal – third place	2015 Tallinn	110 m hs
European U20 Championships
Silver medal – second place	2013 Rieti	110 m hs
European Youth Olympic Festival
Gold medal – first place	2011 Trabzon	110 m hs

Lorenzo Perini (born 22 July 1994) is an Italian hurdler who won a gold medal at the 2018 Mediterranean Games.

== Biography ==
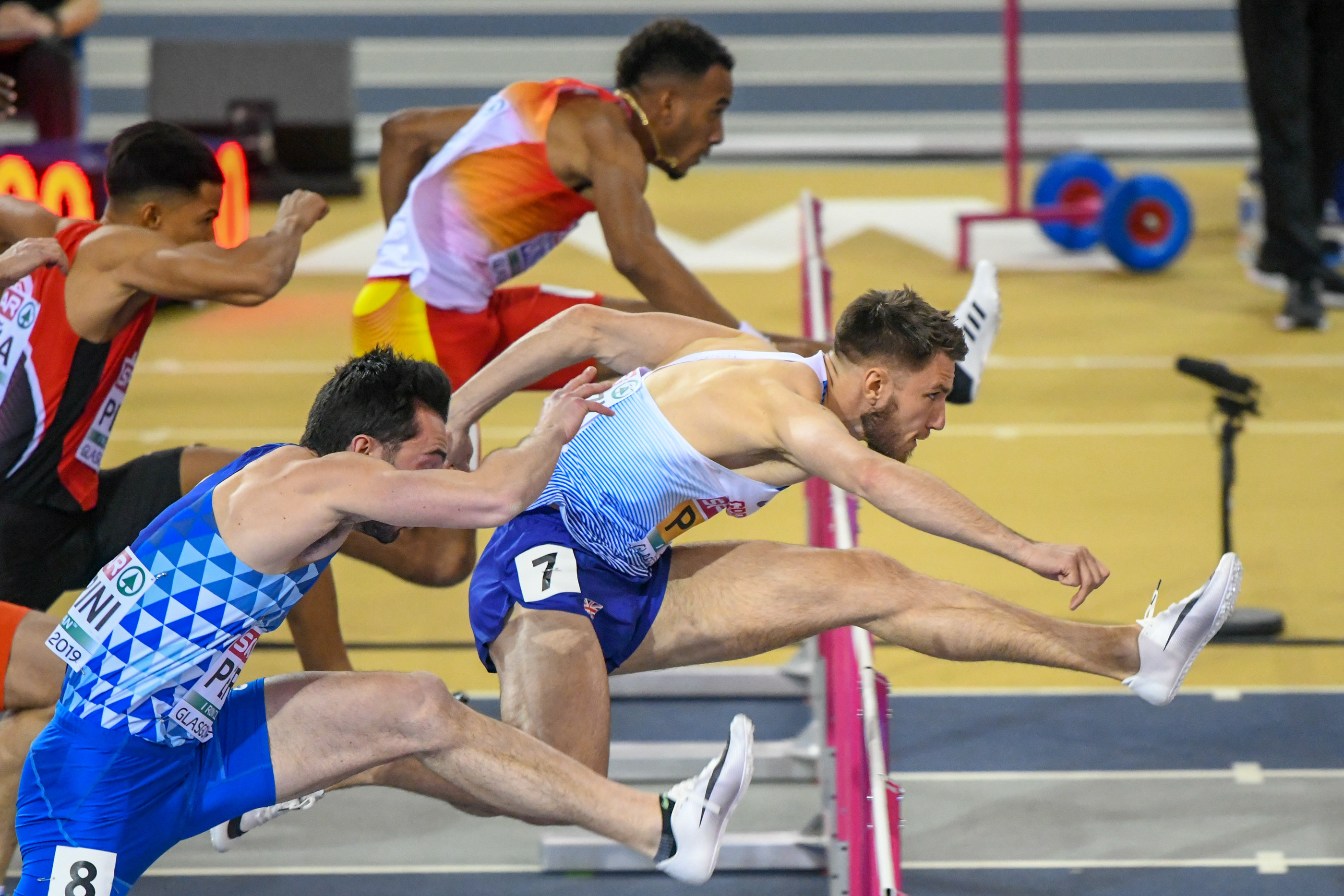
Perini (#8) at the 2019 European Indoor Championships.

During his career he won three medals at youth level and three times the national championships. He is engaged to the hurdler Luminosa Bogliolo.

== Achievements ==
Senior level

Year	Competition	Venue	Position	Event	Time	Notes
2016	European Championships	(Netherlands) Amsterdam	Semi	110 m hs	13.79	
2017	Golden Gala	(Italy) Rome	8th	110 m hs	13.65	
2017	European Team Championships	(France) Lille	7th	110 m hs	13.62	PB
2018	Mediterranean Games	(Spain) Tarragona	1st	110 m hs	13.49	PB
2019	European Indoor Championships	(United Kingdom) Glasgow	Semi	60 m hs	7.70	
2019	Universiade	(Italy) Naples	4th	110 m hs	13.50	

== Personal bests ==
- 110 metres hurdles: 13.46 ( (Italy) Naples, 12 July 2019)
- 60 metres hurdles: 7.66 ( (France) Mondeville, 2 February 2019)

== National titles ==
He won five times the national championship.

- Italian Athletics Championships
  - 110 metres hurdles: 2017, 2018
- Italian Athletics Indoor Championships
  - 600 metres hurdles: 2016, 2019, 2020

== See also ==
- Italian all-time lists - 100 metres hurdles
- Italy at the 2018 Mediterranean Games
