= Garfield Darien =

French track and field athlete

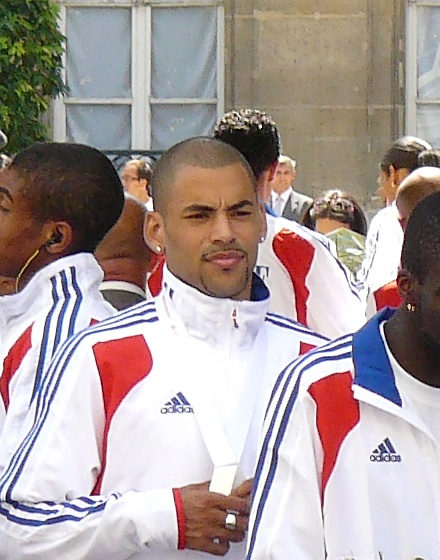

Medal record

Men's athletics

Representing France

World Indoor Championships
Bronze medal – third place	2014 Sopot	60 m hurdles

European Championships
Silver medal – second place	2010 Barcelona	110 m hurdles
Silver medal – second place	2012 Helsinki	110 m hurdles

European Indoor Championships
Silver medal – second place	2011 Paris	60 m hurdles

Garfield Darien (born 22 December 1987) is a French track and field athlete who specialises in the 110 metres hurdles.

Born in Lyon, Darien made his first international appearances as a junior, finishing in seventh at the 2004 World Junior Championships in Athletics and becoming the 110 m hurdles champion at the 2005 European Athletics Junior Championships. He set a personal best of 13.73 seconds that year, but competed infrequently over the following two years. He returned to action in 2008 and improved his best to 13.50 seconds.

The 2009 season saw him enter into major senior competitions for the first time. He was sixth in the 60 metres hurdles at the 2009 European Athletics Indoor Championships. He began to make in-roads into the major circuit, taking third place at the Meeting Areva in Paris, before improving to 13.36 seconds with a fourth-place finish at the Herculis meeting. He attended the 2009 World Championships in Athletics and reached the semi-finals of the 110 m hurdles competition. He represented France at the 2010 IAAF World Indoor Championships but did not progress past the heats stage.

Despite entering the 2010 European Athletics Championships as a rank outsider for the title, Darien won the silver medal with a personal best time of 13.34 seconds. He repeated this success at the 2011 European Athletics Indoor Championships on March 4, winning silver in the 60 m hurdles in another best of 7.56 seconds. He was the silver medallist at the 2011 European Team Championships, but missed much of the later outdoor season due to injury. He returned to action in June 2012 and promptly set a hurdles best of 13.24 seconds to win in Geneva, then matched that time at the Memorial Primo Nebiolo.
