= Paolo Dal Molin =

Italian hurdler

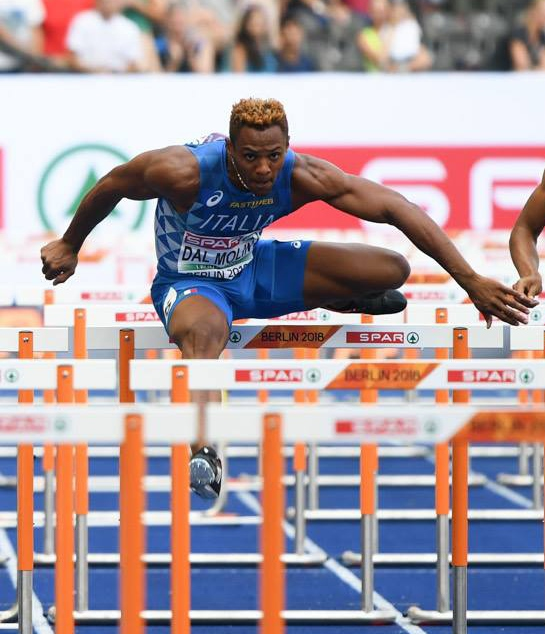

Personal information
- National team: Italy
- Born: 31 July 1987 (age 38) Yaoundé, Cameroon
- Height: 1.82 m (6 ft 0 in)
- Weight: 76 kg (168 lb)

Sport
- Sport: Athletics
- Event: Hurdling
- Club: Athletic Club 96; G.S. Fiamme Oro
- Coached by: Hansjörg Holzamer; Marco La Rosa

Achievements and titles
- Personal bests: 60 m hs: 7.51 (2013); 110 m hs: 13.27 (2021)
Medal record
European Indoor Championships
| Silver medal – second place | 2013 Gothenburg | 60 m hurdles |
| Bronze medal – third place | 2021 Toruń | 60 m hurdles |

Paolo Dal Molin (born 31 July 1987) is an Italian athlete competing in the 110 metres hurdles. He competed at the 2020 Summer Olympics, in 110 m hurdles.

== Biography ==
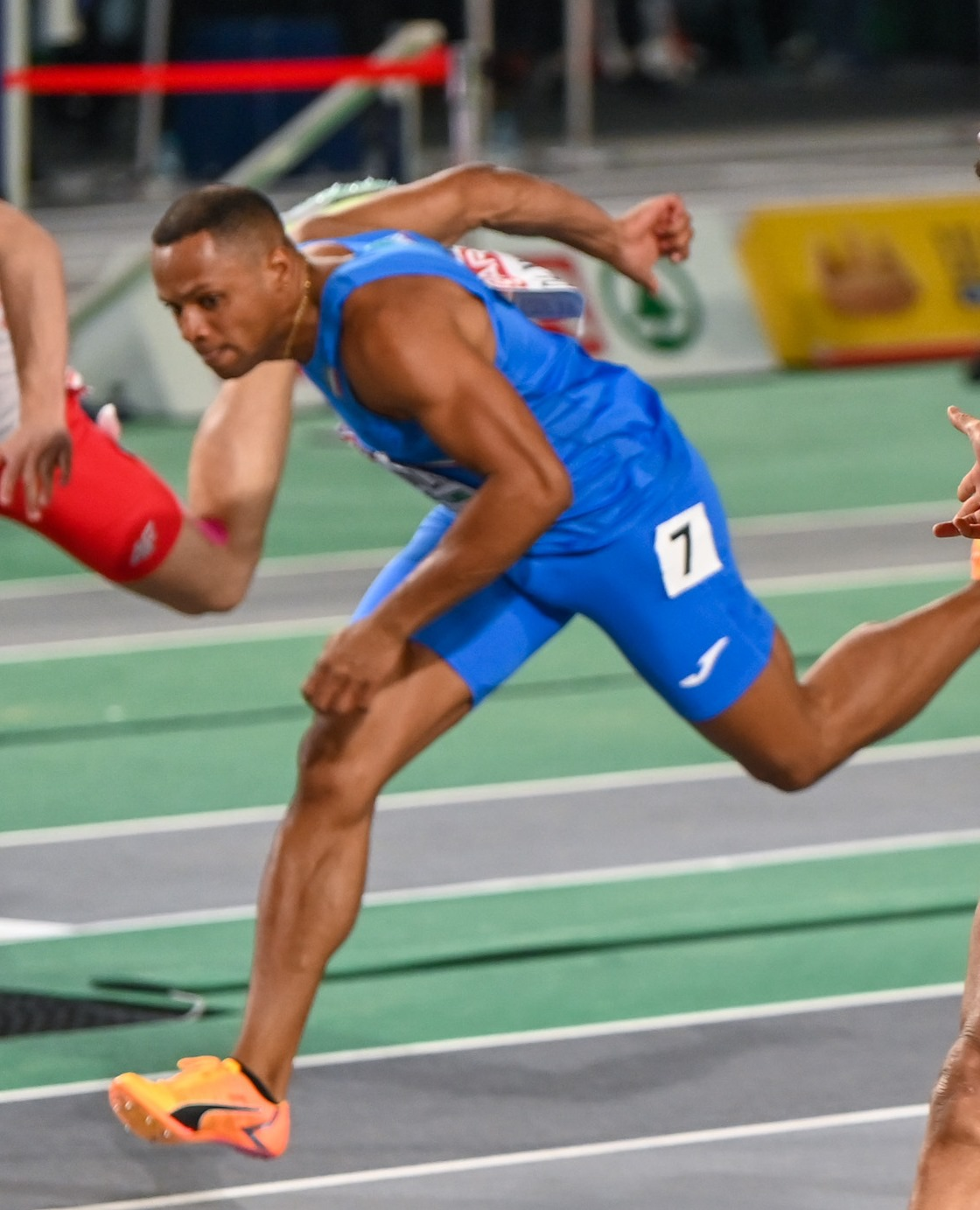
Dal Molin at Istanbul 2023

Born in Yaoundé, Cameroon, to a Cameroonian mother and father, he moved to Italy at the age of 10 years. He won his country's senior national championship twice and in 2013, n3 February 2013, ranked at tth place in the IAAF world list.

== National records ==
- 60 metres hurdles: 7.51 ( (Sweden) Gothenburg, 1 March 2013) - Current holder
- 110 m hurdles: 13.27 ( (Italy) Rovereto, 26 June 2021) - Current holder

== Achievements ==
| Year | Competition | Venue | Rank | Event | Time | Notes |
|---|---|---|---|---|---|---|
| 2012 | World Indoor Championships | (Turkey) Istanbul | SF | 60 metres hurdles | 7.92 | |
| 2013 | European Indoor Championships | (Sweden) Gothenburg | 2nd | 60 metres hs | 7.51 | NR |
| 2018 | European Championships | (Germany) Berlin | SF | 110 metres hs | 13.61 | (Note: He ran his PB 13.40, better crono of all athletes, in heats.) |
| 2021 | European Indoor Championships | (Poland) Toruń | 3rd | 60 metres hs | 7.56 | |

== Progression ==
110 m hs

| Year | Performance | Venue | Date | World Ranking |
|---|---|---|---|---|
| 2021 | 13.27 | (Italy) Rovereto | 26 June | |
| 2020 | 13.61 | Monaco | 14 Aug | |
| 2019 | 13.55 | (Germany) Mannheim | 19 July | |
| 2018 | 13.40 | (Germany) Berlin | 9 Aug | |
| 2014 | 13.47 | (Italy) Rovereto | 19 July | |
| 2012 | 13.64 | (Germany) Mannheim | 13 May | |
| 2011 | 13.67 | (Switzerland) Bellinzona | 15 September | |
| 2010 | 13.78 | (Italy) Alessandria | 27 September | |

60 m hs

| Year | Performance | Venue | Date | World Ranking |
|---|---|---|---|---|
| 2013 | 7.51 | (Sweden) Gothenburg | 1 March | |
| 2012 | 7.70 | (Belgium) Ghent | 18 February | |
| 2011 | 7.90 | (Italy) Ancona | 14 February | |

== National titles ==
Dal Molin won four national championships at individual senior level.

- Italian Athletics Championships
  - 110 metres hurdles: 2012, 2021 (2)
- Italian Athletics Indoor Championships
  - 60 metres hurdles: 2012, 2014 (2)

== See also ==
- Italian records in athletics
- Italian all-time lists - 110 metres hurdles
