= Aleksey Dryomin =

Russian sprinter

Aleksey Dryomin (Алексе́й Никола́евич Дрёмин) (born 10 May 1989 in Chelyabinsk) is a Russian sprinter. He competed in the 110 m hurdles event at the 2012 Summer Olympics.
