= 2009 World Championships in Athletics – Men's 110 metres hurdles =

The men's 110 metres hurdles at the 2009 World Championships in Athletics was held at the Olympic Stadium 19 and 20 August.

Just as he had done at the 2008 Olympic final, former world record holder Liu Xiang missed the competition through injury, leaving the reigning Olympic champion and world record holder Dayron Robles as the favourite. Furthermore, two of the fastest hurdlers of the season, David Oliver and Dexter Faulk, had not been selected for the American team, which featured David Payne, Terrence Trammell, and Aries Merritt as the main challengers to Robles. Twenty-one-year-old Ryan Brathwaite was a much improved hurdler that season, and Dwight Thomas and Maurice Wignall of Jamaica were other contenders.

The heats stage was one of the more eventful of the championships: Robles struggled to qualify in third as he was hampered by an injury, Merritt did not progress from his race (having earlier suffered a twisted ankle), and Andy Turner (another carrying an injury) was also eliminated. Dániel Kiss was the fastest of the round, setting a Hungarian record. Brathwaite was the only pre-race favourite to win in the heats, while Alexander John and Ji Wei were the other fastest hurdlers. In the semi-finals, Trammell and Petr Svoboda were the top two in the first semi-final, and Payne and Brathwaite (who set a national record), took the second race. William Sharman set a personal best to win the third semi-final, which saw Robles pull up due to injury and Kiss eliminated.

In the final, Brathwaite started poorly but was soon level with Payne and Trammell. The three remained even after the final hurdle and, with one hundredth of a second between them, it was a photo finish. Brathwaite emerged as the winner with a national record of 13.14 seconds, Trammell was the silver medallist, and Payne took the bronze. Sharman took fourth with a personal best of 13.30 seconds and Wignall finished fifth, clocking 13.31 seconds, his best of the year.

Although he had entered the competition as an outside medal possibility, Brathwaite became the youngest ever champion in the event, and was also Barbados' first ever gold medallist in athletics at either the World Championships or the Olympic Games. Unable to capitalise on the absence of Xiang and Robles, perennial minor medallists Payne and Trammell again missed out on the gold medal. After Brathwaite, fourth-placed William Sharman was the other surprise of the race: he was a last minute addition to the British team, and his two personal best performances turned him from a rank outsider to Europe's fastest at the competition.

== Medalists ==
Gold	Ryan Brathwaite; Barbados (BAR)
Silver	Terrence Trammell; United States (USA)
Bronze	David Payne; United States (USA)

== Records ==
World record	Dayron Robles (CUB)	12.87	Ostrava, Czech Republic	12 June 2008
Championship record	Colin Jackson (GBR)	12.91	Stuttgart, Germany	20 August 1993
World leading	Dayron Robles (CUB)	13.04	Ostrava, Czech Republic	17 June 2009
African record	Shaun Bownes (RSA)	13.26	Heusden, Netherlands	14 July 2001
Asian record	Liu Xiang (CHN)	12.88	Lausanne, Switzerland	11 July 2006
North American record	Dayron Robles (CUB)	12.87	Ostrava, Czech Republic	12 June 2008
South American record	Redelén dos Santos (BRA)	13.29	Lisbon, Portugal	13 June 2004
European record	Colin Jackson (GBR)	12.91	Stuttgart, Germany	20 August 1993
Oceanian record	Kyle Vander Kuyp (AUS)	13.29	Gothenburg, Sweden	11 August 1995

== Qualification standards ==
A time	B time
13.55	13.62

== Schedule ==
Date	Time	Round
19 August 2009	11:35	Heats
20 August 2009	18:15	Semi-finals
20 August 2009	20:55	Final

== Results ==
=== Heats ===
Qualification: First 3 in each heat (Q) and the next 6 fastest (q) advance to the semi-finals.

Rank	Heat	Name	Nationality	Time	Notes
1	6	Dániel Kiss	Hungary	13.34	Q, NR
2	4	Ryan Brathwaite	Barbados	13.35	Q
3	4	Alexander John	Germany	13.41	Q
4	5	Ji Wei	China	13.51	Q
4	5	Terrence Trammell	United States	13.51	Q
6	4	William Sharman	Great Britain & N.I.	13.52	Q
6	6	Paulo Villar	Colombia	13.52	Q, SB
8	5	Gregory Sedoc	Netherlands	13.54	Q
8	6	David Payne	United States	13.54	Q
10	5	Dimitri Bascou	France	13.55	q
11	1	Shi Dongpeng	China	13.56	Q
11	3	Petr Svoboda	Czech Republic	13.56	Q
11	3	Garfield Darien	France	13.56	Q
11	3	Artur Noga	Poland	13.56	Q
15	1	Dwight Thomas	Jamaica	13.57	Q
15	5	Shamar Sands	Bahamas	13.57	q
17	4	Staņislavs Olijars	Latvia	13.59	q
18	4	Maksim Lynsha	Belarus	13.61	q
18	6	Dayron Capetillo	Cuba	13.61	q
20	2	Maurice Wignall	Jamaica	13.62	Q
21	1	Jackson Quiñónez	Spain	13.63	Q
21	4	Evgeniy Borisov	Russia	13.63	q
23	2	Helge Schwarzer	Germany	13.66	Q
24	2	Dayron Robles	Cuba	13.67	Q
24	1	Lehann Fourie	South Africa	13.67	
26	5	Selim Nurudeen	Nigeria	13.68	
27	3	Aries Merritt	United States	13.70	
27	6	Richard Phillips	Jamaica	13.70	
29	3	Serhiy Demydyuk	Ukraine	13.71	SB
30	2	Cédric Lavanne	France	13.72	
30	2	Felipe Vivancos	Spain	13.72	
32	1	Andy Turner	Great Britain & N.I.	13.73	
33	6	Matthias Bühler	Germany	13.75	
34	3	Adrien Deghelt	Belgium	13.78	
35	5	Héctor Cotto	Puerto Rico	13.81	
36	1	Lee Jung-Joon	South Korea	13.83	SB
36	3	Gianni Frankis	Great Britain & N.I.	13.83	
38	1	Tasuku Tanonaka	Japan	13.84	
39	6	David Ilariani	Georgia	13.86	
40	4	Park Tae-Kyong	South Korea	13.93	
41	5	Rayzam Shah Wan Sofian	Malaysia	14.06	
42	2	Damien Broothaerts	Belgium	14.15	
43	6	Abdul Hakeem Abdul Halim	Singapore	14.63	SB
44	4	Ahmad Hazer	Lebanon	14.74	
45	3	Toriki Urarii	French Polynesia	15.01	SB
	1	Joseph-Berlioz Randriamihaja	Madagascar	DNF	
	2	Yin Jing	China	DNS	

Key: Q = qualification by place in heat, q = qualification by overall place, SB = Seasonal best

=== Semi-finals ===
Qualification: First 2 in each semi-final (Q) and the next 2 fastest (q) advance to the final.

Rank	Heat	Name	Nationality	Time	Notes
1	2	Ryan Brathwaite	Barbados	13.18	Q, NR
2	1	Terrence Trammell	United States	13.24	Q
2	2	David Payne	United States	13.24	Q
4	1	Petr Svoboda	Czech Republic	13.33	Q, SB
5	2	Dwight Thomas	Jamaica	13.37	q
6	3	William Sharman	Great Britain & N.I.	13.38	Q, PB
7	1	Ji Wei	China	13.41	q, SB
8	2	Shi Dongpeng	China	13.42	SB
9	1	Artur Noga	Poland	13.43	SB
9	3	Maurice Wignall	Jamaica	13.43	Q, SB
11	1	Paulo Villar	Colombia	13.44	SB
12	2	Gregory Sedoc	Netherlands	13.45	
12	3	Dániel Kiss	Hungary	13.45	
14	2	Maksim Lynsha	Belarus	13.46	PB
15	3	Shamar Sands	Bahamas	13.47	
16	2	Dimitri Bascou	France	13.49	PB
17	1	Staņislavs Olijars	Latvia	13.50	
18	1	Jackson Quiñónez	Spain	13.54	
19	1	Dayron Capetillo	Cuba	13.55	
20	3	Garfield Darien	France	13.57	
21	3	Evgeniy Borisov	Russia	13.63	
22	2	Alexander John	Germany	13.64	
23	3	Helge Schwarzer	Germany	13.72	
	3	Dayron Robles	Cuba	DNF	

=== Final ===
Rank	Name	Nationality	Time	Notes
1st place, gold medalist(s)	Ryan Brathwaite	Barbados	13.14	NR
2nd place, silver medalist(s)	Terrence Trammell	United States	13.15	
3rd place, bronze medalist(s)	David Payne	United States	13.15	
4	William Sharman	Great Britain & N.I.	13.30	PB
5	Maurice Wignall	Jamaica	13.31	SB
6	Petr Svoboda	Czech Republic	13.38	
7	Dwight Thomas	Jamaica	13.56	
8	Ji Wei	China	13.57	
