= Dayron =

Dayron is a given name. Notable people with the given name include:

- Dayron Capetillo (born 1987), Cuban hurdler
- Dayron Márquez (born 1983), Colombian javelin thrower
- Dayron Robles (born 1986), Cuban track and field athlete
- Dayron Varona (born 1988), Cuban baseball player

== See also ==
- Day'Ron Sharpe (born 2001), American basketball player
- Dairon, another given name
