= 2012 IAAF World Indoor Championships – Men's 60 metres hurdles =

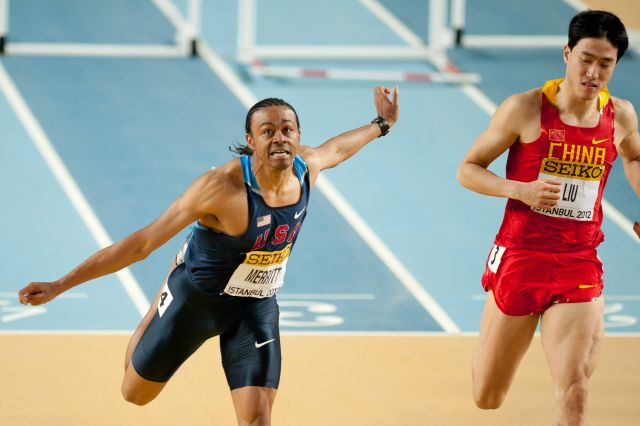
Aries Merritt en route to victory.

The men's 60 metres hurdles at the 2012 IAAF World Indoor Championships was held at the Ataköy Athletics Arena on 10 and 11 March.

== Medalists ==
Gold	Silver	Bronze
Aries Merritt; United States	Liu Xiang; China	Pascal Martinot-Lagarde; France

== Records ==
Standing records prior to the 2012 IAAF World Indoor Championships
World record	Colin Jackson (GBR)	7.30	Sindelfingen, Germany	6 March 1994
Championship record	Dayron Robles (CUB)	7.34	Doha, Qatar	14 March 2010
World Leading	Dexter Faulk (USA)	7.40	Albuquerque, United States	25 February 2012
African record	Shaun Bownes (RSA)	7.52	Ghent, Belgium	23 February 2001
Asian record	Liu Xiang (CHN)	7.41	Birmingham, Great Britain	18 February 2012
European record	Colin Jackson (GBR)	7.30	Sindelfingen, Germany	6 March 1994
North and Central American and Caribbean record	Dayron Robles (CUB)	7.33	Düsseldorf, Germany	8 February 2008
Oceanian Record	Kyle Vander Kuyp (AUS)	7.73	Barcelona, Spain	11 March 1995
Oceanian Record	Kyle Vander Kuyp (AUS)	7.73	Barcelona, Spain	12 March 1995
Oceanian Record	Kyle Vander Kuyp (AUS)	7.73	Paris, France	8 March 1997
South American record	Márcio de Souza (BRA)	7.60	Karlsruhe, Germany	15 February 2004

== Qualification standards ==
Indoor	Outdoor
7.74	13.55 (110 mH)

== Schedule ==
Date	Time	Round
March 10, 2012	9:40	Heats
March 11, 2012	14:45	Semifinals
March 11, 2012	17:20	Final

== Results ==
=== Heats ===
Qualification: First 3 of each heat (Q) plus 4 fastest times (q) qualified

Rank	Heat	Name	Nationality	Time	Notes
1	2	Andrew Pozzi	Great Britain	7.61	Q, PB
2	2	Liu Xiang	China	7.62	Q
3	1	Pascal Martinot-Lagarde	France	7.66	Q
3	4	Aries Merritt	United States	7.66	Q
5	1	Lehann Fourie	South Africa	7.67	Q
6	3	Emanuele Abate	Italy	7.71	Q
6	4	Richard Phillips	Jamaica	7.71	Q
8	1	Konstantin Shabanov	Russia	7.72	Q
8	2	Helge Schwarzer	Germany	7.72	Q
10	1	Paolo dal Molin	Italy	7.78	q
11	2	Balázs Baji	Hungary	7.81	q
11	3	Maksim Lynsha	Belarus	7.81	Q
11	4	Artur Noga	Poland	7.81	Q
14	4	Orlando Ortega	Cuba	7.82	q
15	4	Ben Reynolds	Ireland	7.82	q
16	3	Jackson Quiñónez	Spain	7.83	Q
16	1	Konstadinos Douvalidis	Greece	7.83	
16	4	Gregor Traber	Germany	7.83	
19	2	Dominik Bochenek	Poland	7.85	
20	3	Evgeniy Borisov	Russia	7.88	
21	2	Ronald Forbes	Cayman Islands	7.95	
22	3	Eric Keddo	Jamaica	7.96	
23	2	Abdulaziz Al-Mandeel	Kuwait	7.98	
24	3	Shi Dongpeng	China	8.15	SB
25	2	Jorge McFarlane	Peru	8.16	SB
26	3	Alexandros Stavrides	Cyprus	8.17	
27	1	Kim Fai Iong	Macau	8.41	SB
28	1	Ali Hazer	Lebanon	8.84	
29	4	Enrique Llanos	Puerto Rico	9.65	
	4	Mensah Elliott	Gambia	DNF	
	1	Othmane Hadj Lazib	Algeria	DQ	
	3	Kevin Craddock	United States	DNS	

=== Semifinals ===
Qualification: First 4 of each heat (Q) qualified.

Rank	Heat	Name	Nationality	Time	Notes
1	1	Liu Xiang	China	7.53	Q
2	1	Andrew Pozzi	Great Britain	7.56	Q, PB
3	2	Pascal Martinot-Lagarde	France	7.60	Q
4	1	Emanuele Abate	Italy	7.62	Q
5	2	Aries Merritt	United States	7.65	Q
6	2	Lehann Fourie	South Africa	7.65	Q
7	1	Konstantin Shabanov	Russia	7.67	Q
8	2	Artur Noga	Poland	7.68	Q
9	2	Orlando Ortega	Cuba	7.71	
10	1	Maksim Lynsha	Belarus	7.74	
11	2	Helge Schwarzer	Germany	7.75	
12	1	Balázs Baji	Hungary	7.76	
13	1	Ben Reynolds	Ireland	7.80	
14	1	Jackson Quiñónez	Spain	7.82	
15	2	Paolo dal Molin	Italy	7.92	
	2	Richard Phillips	Jamaica	DNS	

=== Final ===
The final began at 17:21.

Rank	Lane	Name	Nationality	Time	Notes
1st place, gold medalist(s)	4	Aries Merritt	United States	7.44	
2nd place, silver medalist(s)	3	Liu Xiang	China	7.49	
3rd place, bronze medalist(s)	6	Pascal Martinot-Lagarde	France	7.53	PB
4	5	Andrew Pozzi	Great Britain	7.58	
5	2	Konstantin Shabanov	Russia	7.60	
6	7	Emanuele Abate	Italy	7.63	
7	8	Lehann Fourie	South Africa	7.69	
8	1	Artur Noga	Poland	7.74	
