= Antwon Hicks =

Nigerian-American hurdler (born 1983)

Medal record

Men's athletics

Representing the United States

World Junior Championships
Gold medal – first place	2002 Kingston	110 m hurdles

Antwon Toritseju Hicks (born 12 March 1983) is an American/Nigerian track and field hurdler who competes in the 110-meter hurdles. He was the gold medallist in that event at the 2002 World Junior Championships in Athletics – the first American to win that title. He was twice NCAA Indoor Champion in the 60-meter hurdles.

Hicks, the son of Kimilar and Ronnie Graham, grew up in Hot Springs, Arkansas and attended Hot Springs High School. While there he took part in high jump and hurdling. He was a 15-time state high school champion and the 1999 American junior champion in the high jump. He attended the University of Mississippi and competed for their Ole Miss Rebels collegiate team from 2002 to 2004. In addition to his NCAA indoor titles, he ran a school record 7.61 seconds for the 60 m hurdles. Outdoors, he was fifth in the NCAA 110 m hurdles in his freshman year and was runner-up at the 2004 Southeastern Conference Championships.

At national level, he was a semi-finalist in the 110 m hurdles at the 2004 United States Olympic Trials, then took sixth at the 2005 USA Outdoor Track and Field Championships in a new personal record of 13.35 seconds. A regular participant at national events, he came close to Olympic selection on two occasions, coming fifth at the 2008 United States Olympic Trials and fourth at the 2012 United States Olympic Trials. At the 2008 event he recorded his lifetime best of 13.09 seconds in the semi-finals. This time ranked him fourth in the world that year and moved him into the all-time top thirty hurdlers. The only people to run faster that year were world record holder and Olympic champion Dayron Robles and American Olympic medalists David Oliver and Terrence Trammell.

Hicks never competed on the global stage as a senior athlete, despite ranking near the top ten in the world in the period from 2008 to 2013. He was a prominent athlete on the professional track circuit, however, and won the Bislett Games during the 2009 IAAF Golden League season. He ranked seventh at the 2009 IAAF World Athletics Final.

He opted to run for Nigeria late in his career. Another American hurdler, Tyron Akins, opted to do the same around this period in 2014.

== Personal bests ==
- 110 metres hurdles – 13.09 (2008)
- 200 metres – 21.52 (2005)
- 60 metres indoor – 6.83 (2011)
- 55 metres hurdles indoor – 7.15 (2004)
- 60 metres hurdles indoor – 7.53 (2008)
- High jump indoor – 2.10 m (2002)
