= 2002 World Junior Championships in Athletics – Men's 110 metres hurdles =

The men's 110 metres hurdles event at the 2002 World Junior Championships in Athletics was held in Kingston, Jamaica, at National Stadium on 19, 20 and 21 July. 106.7 cm (3'6) (senior implement) hurdles were used.

== Medalists ==
Gold	Antwon Hicks; United States
Silver	Shi Dongpeng; China
Bronze	Shamar Sands; Bahamas

== Results ==
=== Final ===
21 July
Wind: +2.6 m/s

Rank	Name	Nationality	Time	Notes
1st place, gold medalist(s)	Antwon Hicks	United States	13.42 w	
2nd place, silver medalist(s)	Shi Dongpeng	China	13.58 w	
3rd place, bronze medalist(s)	Shamar Sands	Bahamas	13.67 w	
4	Richard Phillips	Jamaica	13.90 w	
5	Kenneth Ferguson	United States	13.91 w	
6	Jurica Grabušić	Croatia	14.02 w	
7	Stefan Wieser	Germany	14.16 w	
	Thiago Dias	Brazil	DNF	

=== Semifinals ===
20 July

==== Semifinal 1 ====
Wind: +0.2 m/s

Rank	Name	Nationality	Time	Notes
1	Kenneth Ferguson	United States	14.01	Q
2	Richard Phillips	Jamaica	14.02	Q
3	Thiago Dias	Brazil	14.11	Q
4	Stefan Wieser	Germany	14.16	Q
5	Ryan Purcell	Australia	14.26	
6	Andreas Kundert	Switzerland	14.75	
7	Stanislav Sajdok	Czech Republic	15.71	
	Nassim Brahimi	Qatar	DNF	

==== Semifinal 2 ====
Wind: +0.5 m/s

Rank	Name	Nationality	Time	Notes
1	Antwon Hicks	United States	13.59	Q
2	Shamar Sands	Bahamas	13.67	Q
3	Shi Dongpeng	China	13.81	Q
4	Jurica Grabušić	Croatia	14.24	Q
5	Lukas Lanthaler	Italy	14.43	
6	Yusuke Akiyama	Japan	14.49	
7	István Kasper	Hungary	14.79	
	Mohamed Al-Othman	Kuwait	DNF	

=== Heats ===
19 July

==== Heat 1 ====
Wind: -2.9 m/s

Rank	Name	Nationality	Time	Notes
1	Kenneth Ferguson	United States	14.04	Q
2	Shamar Sands	Bahamas	14.18	Q
3	Jurica Grabušić	Croatia	14.20	Q
4	Mohamed Al-Othman	Kuwait	14.47	q
5	Ryan Purcell	Australia	14.55	q
6	Rodrigo Pereira	Brazil	14.66	
7	Markus Vilén	Finland	14.80	
8	Ko Wen-Bin	Chinese Taipei	15.26	

==== Heat 2 ====
Wind: -1.5 m/s

Rank	Name	Nationality	Time	Notes
1	Shi Dongpeng	China	14.54	Q
2	István Kasper	Hungary	14.90	Q
3	Yusuke Akiyama	Japan	14.90	Q
4	Cédric Beyera	France	14.90	
5	Sheldon Leith	Jamaica	15.18	
	Jesús Costa	Cuba	DNF	

==== Heat 3 ====
Wind: -3.5 m/s

Rank	Name	Nationality	Time	Notes
1	Antwon Hicks	United States	14.01	Q
2	Richard Phillips	Jamaica	14.33	Q
3	Nassim Brahimi	Qatar	14.36	Q
4	José Antonio López	Spain	14.65	
5	Damien Broothaerts	Belgium	14.68	
6	Yuji Ohashi	Japan	14.85	
7	Navnidh Singh Sekhon	India	15.16	
	Petr Svoboda	Czech Republic	DNF	

==== Heat 4 ====
Wind: -1.7 m/s

Rank	Name	Nationality	Time	Notes
1	Thiago Dias	Brazil	14.08	Q
2	Andreas Kundert	Switzerland	14.44	Q
3	Stefan Wieser	Germany	14.48	Q
4	Stanislav Sajdok	Czech Republic	14.51	q
5	Lukas Lanthaler	Italy	14.61	q
6	Iban Maiza	Spain	14.88	
7	Benjamin Bennett	Ghana	15.35	

== Participation ==
According to an unofficial count, 29 athletes from 23 countries participated in the event.

- Australia (1)
- Bahamas (1)
- Belgium (1)
- Brazil (2)
- China (1)
- Chinese Taipei (1)
- Croatia (1)
- Cuba (1)
- Czech Republic (2)
- Finland (1)
- France (1)
- Germany (1)
- Ghana (1)
- Hungary (1)
- India (1)
- Italy (1)
- Jamaica (2)
- Japan (2)
- Kuwait (1)
- Qatar (1)
- Spain (2)
- Switzerland (1)
- United States (2)
