= 2011 European Athletics Indoor Championships – Men's 60 metres hurdles =

The Men's 60 metres hurdles event at the 2011 European Athletics Indoor Championships was held at March 4 with the final being held on March 4 at 18:50 local time.

== Records ==
Standing records prior to the 2011 European Athletics Indoor Championships
World record	Colin Jackson (GBR)	7.30	Sindelfingen, Germany	6 March 1994
European record	Colin Jackson (GBR)	7.30	Sindelfingen, Germany	6 March 1994
Championship record	Colin Jackson (GBR)	7.39	Paris, France	12 March 1994
World Leading	David Oliver (USA)	7.37	Stuttgart, Germany	5 February 2011
European Leading	Petr Svoboda (CZE)	7.48	Prague, Czech Republic	19 February 2011

== Results ==
=== Heats ===
First 2 in each heat and 2 best performers advanced to the Final. The semifinals were held at 16:10.

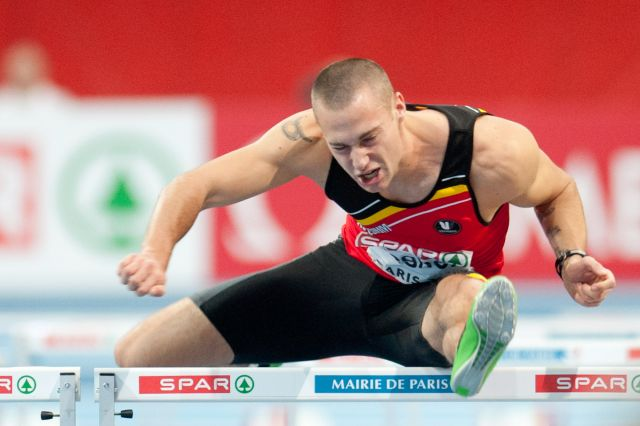
Adrien Deghelt of Belgium won the bronze medal.

Rank	Heat	Name	Nationality	React	Time	Notes
1	3	Petr Svoboda	Czech Republic	0.171	7.55	Q
2	2	Felipe Vivancos	Spain	0.150	7.56	Q, PB
3	2	Garfield Darien	France	0.190	7.60	Q
4	1	Dimitri Bascou	France	0.158	7.62	Q
4	2	Adrien Deghelt	Belgium	0.153	7.62	q
6	3	Konstantin Shabanov	Russia	0.146	7.63	Q, =PB
7	1	Evgeniy Borisov	Russia	0.172	7.68	Q
7	3	Samuel Coco-Viloin	France	0.174	7.68	q
9	3	Jackson Quiñónez	Spain	0.194	7.70	SB
10	1	Maksim Lynsha	Belarus	0.193	7.71	
11	2	Lawrence Clarke	Great Britain	0.147	7.74	
11	3	Emanuele Abate	Italy	0.165	7.74	
13	2	Balázs Baji	Hungary	0.154	7.77	PB
14	1	Jurica Grabušić	Croatia	0.143	7.80	
15	1	Damien Broothaerts	Belgium	0.174	7.84	
16	2	Matúš Janeček	Slovakia	0.170	7.86	
17	1	Joona-Ville Heinä	Finland	0.146	7.90	
18	1	Rasul Dabó	Portugal	0.183	7.93	
18	3	Tobias Furer	Switzerland	0.193	7.93	
20	3	Manuel Prazak	Austria	0.160	7.98	
21	2	Aliaksandr Linnik	Belarus	0.152	8.00	
22	2	Martin Arnaudov	Bulgaria	0.189	8.11	
23	1	Andreas Martinsen	Denmark	0.182	8.38	
	3	Adnan Malkić	Bosnia and Herzegovina	0.231	DQ	

=== Final ===
The final was held at 18:50.

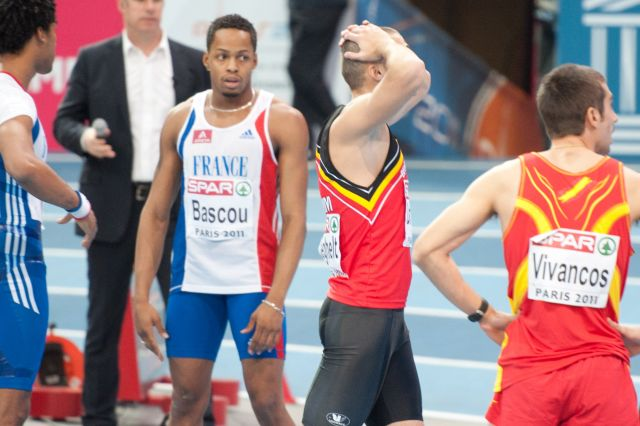
The competitors after the final.

Rank	Lane	Name	Nationality	React	Time	Notes
1st place, gold medalist(s)	5	Petr Svoboda	Czech Republic	0.150	7.49	
2nd place, silver medalist(s)	3	Garfield Darien	France	0.175	7.56	=PB
3rd place, bronze medalist(s)	1	Adrien Deghelt	Belgium	0.161	7.57	PB
4	4	Felipe Vivancos	Spain	0.139	7.59	
5	7	Konstantin Shabanov	Russia	0.154	7.61	PB
6	6	Dimitri Bascou	France	0.190	7.64	
7	8	Evgeniy Borisov	Russia	0.162	7.65	
8	2	Samuel Coco-Viloin	France	0.184	8.08	
