= 2010 IAAF World Indoor Championships – Men's 60 metres hurdles =

The men's 60 metres hurdles competition at the 2010 IAAF World Indoor Championships was held at the ASPIRE Dome on 12 and 14 March.

The competition was set to be one of the highlights of the competition from the very beginning: it was the first major competition for 2004 Olympic champion Liu Xiang's after a long period out through injury and it was the first time that he, Dayron Robles and Terrence Trammell, both being favourites to win had faced each other since the 2007 World Championships.

Only ten athletes were eliminated in the first round in which American hurdlers David Oliver and Trammell ran the fastest times. The majority of athletes gave conservative performances and Ladji Doucouré of France (a former world champion) was the only unexpected elimination, as he suffered an injury at the beginning of heat four. The no false-start rule claimed two victims in the first semi-final in which Liu and Trammell progressed. Former European Indoor champion Gregory Sedoc was eliminated in the second of the three semis while Petr Svoboda won the last semi-final; all the favourites progressed to the final.

The final turned into a head-to-head between Trammell and Robles, with the Cuban pulling alongside the American in the latter part of the race and dipping at the line for the victory. In spite of a slow reaction time, Robles ran a Championships record of 7.34 seconds to win his first indoor title. A perennial silver medallist outdoors, Trammell equalled the American record of 7.36 seconds for another silver, although his time would have been enough for the gold at any of the 12 championships preceding this edition. Oliver ran a personal best of 7.44 seconds to take the bronze while Liu finished in seventh, clearly lacking complete race fitness.

== Medalists ==
Gold	Silver	Bronze
Dayron Robles; Cuba	Terrence Trammell; United States	David Oliver; United States

== Records ==
Standing records prior to the 2010 IAAF World Indoor Championships
World record	Colin Jackson (GBR)	7.30	Sindelfingen, Germany	6 March 1994
Championship record	Allen Johnson (USA)	7.36	Budapest, Hungary	6 March 2004
World Leading	Terrence Trammell (USA)	7.41	Albuquerque, United States	28 February 2010
African record	Shaun Bownes (RSA)	7.52	Ghent, Belgium	23 February 2001
Asian record	Liu Xiang (CHN)	7.42	Karlsruhe, Germany	11 February 2007
European record	Colin Jackson (GBR)	7.30	Sindelfingen, Germany	6 March 1994
North and Central American and Caribbean record	Dayron Robles (CUB)	7.33	Düsseldorf, Germany	8 February 2008
Oceanian record	Kyle Vander Kuyp (AUS)	7.73	Barcelona, Spain	11 March 1995
Oceanian record	Kyle Vander Kuyp (AUS)	7.73	Barcelona, Spain	12 March 1995
Oceanian record	Kyle Vander Kuyp (AUS)	7.73	Paris, France	8 March 1997
South American record	Márcio de Souza (BRA)	7.60	Karlsruhe, Germany	15 February 2004

== Qualification standards ==
Indoor	Outdoor
7.74	13.55 (100mH)

== Schedule ==
Date	Time	Round
March 12, 2010	17:50	Heats
March 14, 2010	16:25	Semifinals
March 14, 2010	18:25	Final

== Results ==
=== Heats ===
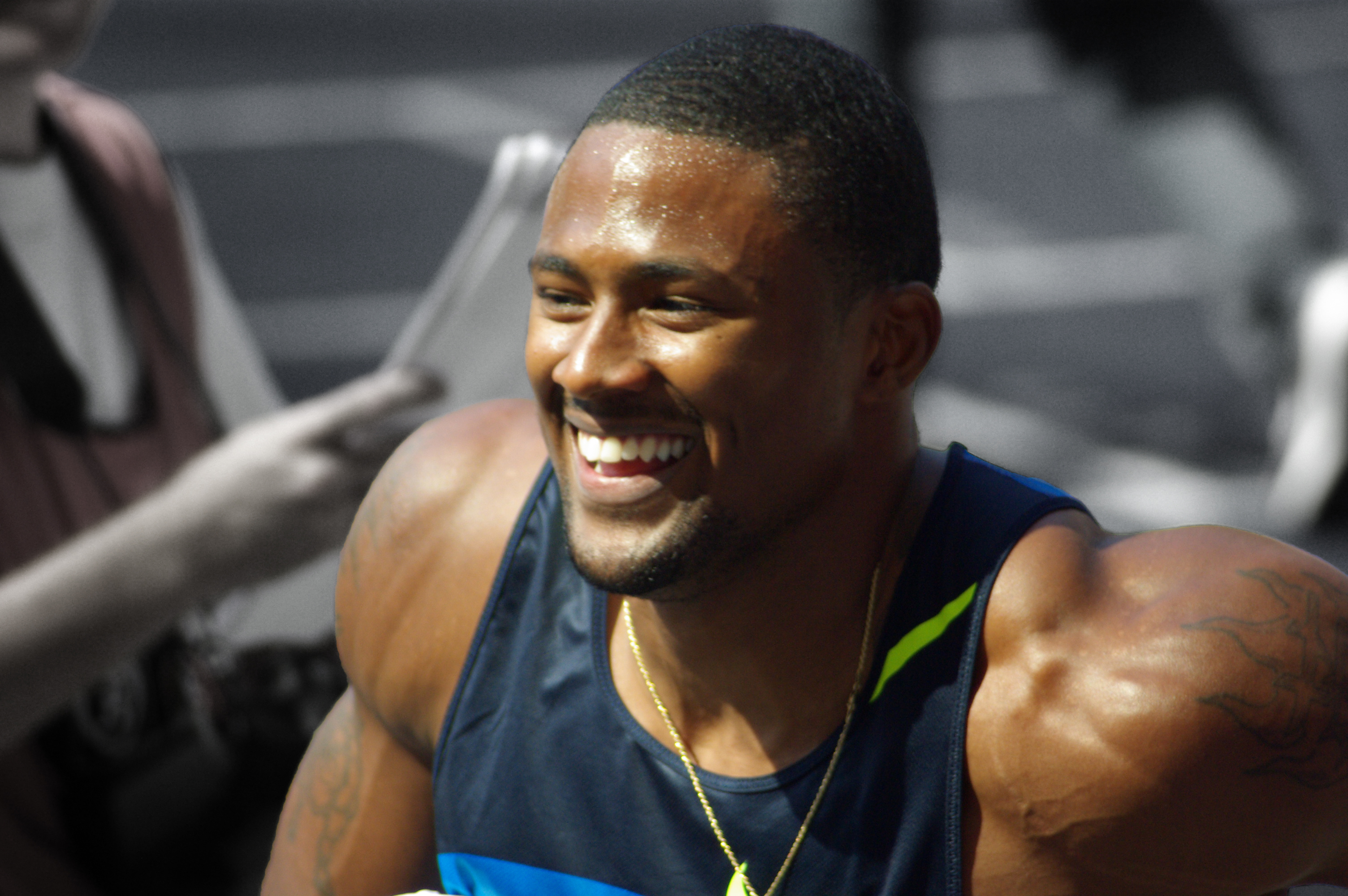
David Oliver, the 2008 Olympic bronze medallist, had the best run in the first day of competition

Qualification: First 4 in each heat (Q) and the next 4 fastest (q) advance to the semifinals.

Rank	Heat	Name	Nationality	Time	Notes
1	1	David Oliver	United States	7.60	Q
2	2	Terrence Trammell	United States	7.60	Q
3	1	Dániel Kiss	Hungary	7.65	Q
4	4	Felipe Vivancos	Spain	7.67	Q, SB
5	1	Alexander John	Germany	7.70	Q
6	4	Maurice Wignall	Jamaica	7.71	Q, SB
DQ	3	Evgeniy Borisov	Russia	~~7.74~~	Q, Doping
7	5	Dayron Robles	Cuba	7.74	Q
8	2	Shamar Sands	Bahamas	7.75	Q
9	4	Petr Svoboda	Czech Republic	7.75	Q
10	3	Helge Schwarzer	Germany	7.76	Q
11	1	Adrien Deghelt	Belgium	7.77	Q
12	5	Héctor Cotto	Puerto Rico	7.78	Q, SB
13	5	Dominik Bochenek	Poland	7.78	Q
14	3	Liu Xiang	China	7.79	Q, SB
15	5	Gregory Sedoc	Netherlands	7.79	Q
16	2	Damien Broothaerts	Belgium	7.80	Q
17	2	Jurica Grabušić	Croatia	7.80	Q
18	3	Philip Nossmy	Sweden	7.80	Q
19	5	Maksim Lynsha	Belarus	7.80	q
20	4	Shi Dongpeng	China	7.83	Q, SB
21	4	Dayron Capetillo	Cuba	7.85	q
22	1	Ronald Forbes	Cayman Islands	7.86	q
23	3	Garfield Darien	France	7.86	q
24	3	Martin Mazáč	Czech Republic	7.97	
25	5	Aleksey Dremin	Russia	8.18	
26	2	Ahmad Hazer	Lebanon	8.36	NR
27	1	Iong Kim Fai	Macau	8.67	
28	1	Inoke Finau	Tonga	9.06	PB
	4	Ladji Doucouré	France	DNF	
	2	Paulo Villar	Colombia	DQ	
	5	Dhirendra Chaudhary	Nepal	DQ	
	2	Dwight Thomas	Jamaica	DNS	
	4	Mohsin Ali	Pakistan	DNS	

=== Semifinals ===
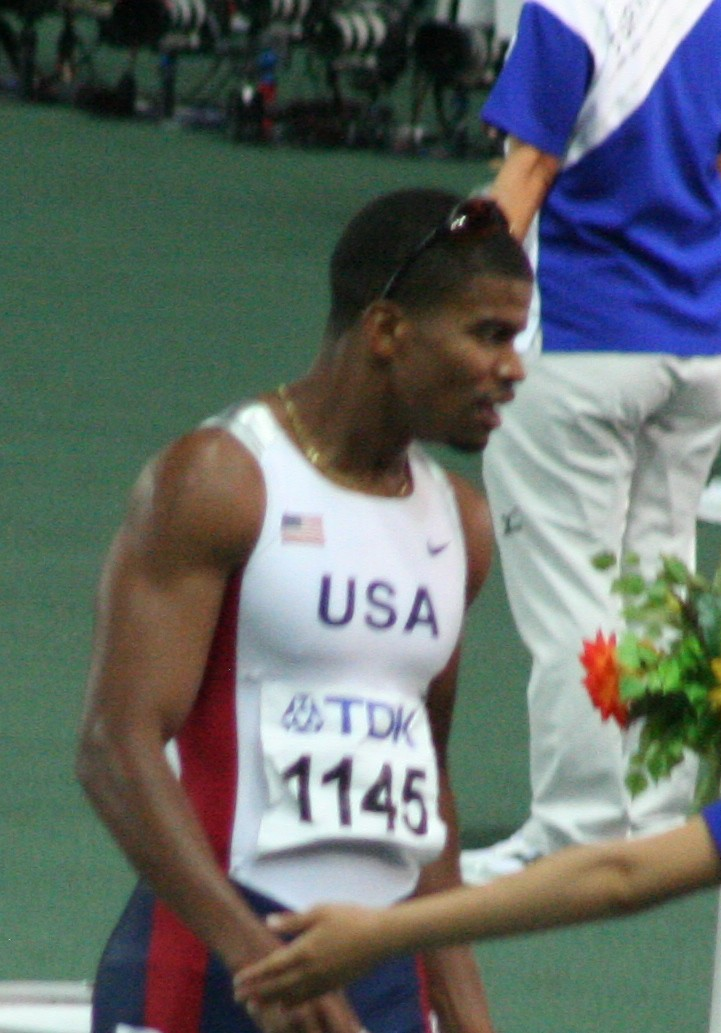
Terrence Trammell was the fastest qualifier through the semi-finals

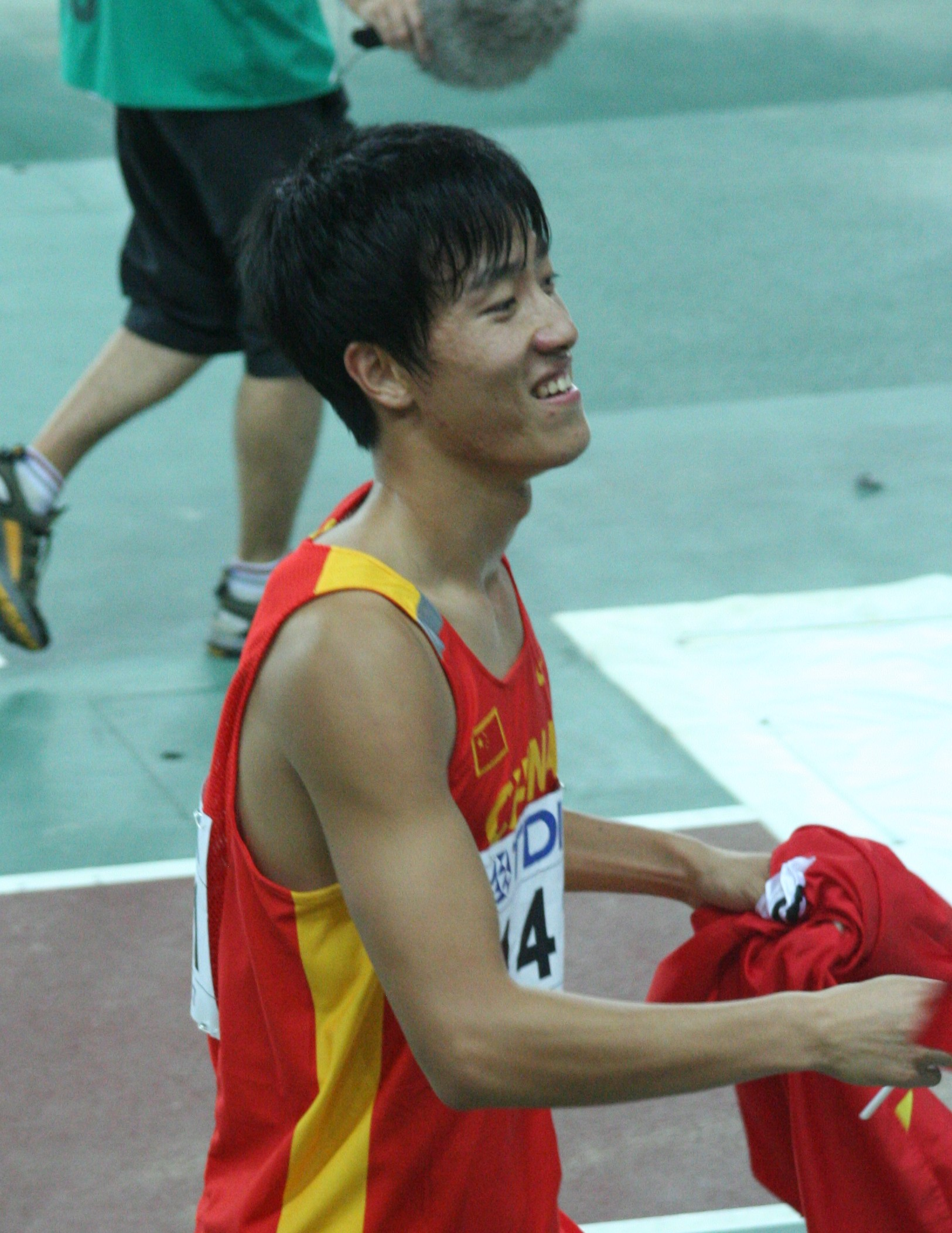
Liu Xiang was the slowest qualifier for the final

Qualification: First 2 in each heat (Q) and the next 2 fastest (q) advance to the final.

Rank	Heat	Name	Nationality	Time	Notes
1	1	Terrence Trammell	United States	7.51	Q
2	2	Dayron Robles	Cuba	7.56	Q
DQ	2	Evgeniy Borisov	Russia	~~7.57~~	Q, Doping
3	3	Petr Svoboda	Czech Republic	7.60	Q
4	3	David Oliver	United States	7.61	Q
5	3	Maurice Wignall	Jamaica	7.62	q, SB
6	3	Dániel Kiss	Hungary	7.64	q
7	2	Gregory Sedoc	Netherlands	7.67	
8	1	Liu Xiang	China	7.68	Q, SB
9	3	Philip Nossmy	Sweden	7.69	
10	2	Maksim Lynsha	Belarus	7.71	
11	2	Helge Schwarzer	Germany	7.74	
12	1	Dayron Capetillo	Cuba	7.76	
13	1	Shamar Sands	Bahamas	7.81	
14	3	Jurica Grabušić	Croatia	7.81	
15	2	Shi Dongpeng	China	7.82	SB
16	1	Adrien Deghelt	Belgium	7.83	
17	2	Damien Broothaerts	Belgium	7.86	
18	2	Héctor Cotto	Puerto Rico	7.87	
19	1	Ronald Forbes	Cayman Islands	7.91	
20	3	Dominik Bochenek	Poland	7.91	
	1	Felipe Vivancos	Spain	DQ	
	1	Alexander John	Germany	DQ	
	3	Garfield Darien	France	DNS	

=== Final ===
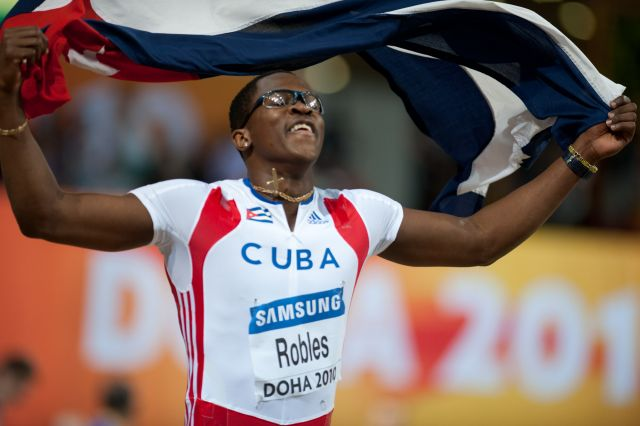
Dayron Robles took the gold in championship record time

Rank	Name	Nationality	Time	Notes
1st place, gold medalist(s)	Dayron Robles	Cuba	7.34	CR, WL
2nd place, silver medalist(s)	Terrence Trammell	United States	7.36	=NR
3rd place, bronze medalist(s)	David Oliver	United States	7.44	PB
DQ	Evgeniy Borisov	Russia	~~7.51~~	~~SB~~, Doping
4	Petr Svoboda	Czech Republic	7.58	
5	Maurice Wignall	Jamaica	7.60	SB
6	Liu Xiang	China	7.65	SB
7	Dániel Kiss	Hungary	7.81	
