= Serhiy Kopanayko =

Ukrainian hurdler

Personal information
- Born: 5 November 1988 (age 37)

Sport
- Sport: Athletics
- Event: 110 m hurdles

Serhiy Kopanayko (Ukrainian: Сергій Копанайко; born 5 November 1988) is a Ukrainian athlete specialising in the sprint hurdles. He represented his country at the 2016 World Indoor Championships, but did not advance past the first round.

His personal bests are 13.77 seconds in the 110 metres hurdles (0.0 m/s, Yalta 2012) and 7.70 seconds in the 60 metres hurdles (Kiev 2016).

== Competition record ==
Year	Competition	Venue	Position	Event	Notes
Representing Ukraine
2011	Universiade	Shenzhen, China	21st (sf)	110 m hurdles	14.32
2013	European Indoor Championships	Gothenburg, Sweden	18th (h)	60 m hurdles	7.82
2015	European Indoor Championships	Prague, Czech Republic	21st (h)	60 m hurdles	7.86
2016	World Indoor Championships	Portland, United States	19th (h)	60 m hurdles	7.77
2016	European Championships	Amsterdam, Netherlands	24th (sf)	110 m hurdles	13.97
2017	European Indoor Championships	Belgrade, Serbia	18th (h)	60 m hurdles	7.95
