= 2015 European Athletics Indoor Championships – Men's 60 metres hurdles =

The men's 60 metres hurdles event at the 2015 European Athletics Indoor Championships was held on 6 March 2015 at 10:32 (heats), 16:25 (semifinals) and 18:55 (final) local time.

== Medalists ==
| Gold | Silver | Bronze |
|---|---|---|
| Pascal Martinot-Lagarde; France | Dimitri Bascou; France | Wilhem Belocian; France |

== Results ==
=== Heats ===
Qualification: First 3 of each heat (Q) and the next 4 fastest (q) qualified for the semifinals.

| Rank | Heat | Athlete | Nationality | Time | Note |
|---|---|---|---|---|---|
| 1 | 3 | Pascal Martinot-Lagarde | France | 7.58 | Q, SB |
| 2 | 4 | Konstantin Shabanov | Russia | 7.61 | Q, SB |
| 3 | 4 | Erik Balnuweit | Germany | 7.62 | Q |
| 4 | 2 | Wilhem Belocian | France | 7.63 | Q |
| 5 | 4 | Balázs Baji | Hungary | 7.64 | Q |
| 6 | 1 | Dimitri Bascou | France | 7.65 | Q |
| 6 | 3 | Lawrence Clarke | Great Britain | 7.65 | Q |
| 8 | 2 | João Carlos Almeida | Portugal | 7.66 | Q, =NR |
| 8 | 3 | Petr Svoboda | Czech Republic | 7.66 | Q, SB |
| 10 | 2 | Konstadinos Douvalidis | Greece | 7.67 | Q |
| 11 | 4 | Damien Broothaerts | Belgium | 7.69 | q |
| 12 | 2 | David Omoregie | Great Britain | 7.72 | q |
| 13 | 2 | Gregory Sedoc | Netherlands | 7.72 | q |
| 14 | 3 | Damian Czykier | Poland | 7.73 | q |
| 15 | 4 | Hassane Fofana | Italy | 7.75 | PB |
| 16 | 3 | Vitali Parakhonka | Belarus | 7.76 | PB |
| 17 | 1 | Dominik Bochenek | Poland | 7.79 | Q |
| 18 | 1 | Andreas Martinsen | Denmark | 7.83 | Q, =PB |
| 19 | 1 | Milan Trajkovic | Cyprus | 7.83 | |
| 20 | 1 | Maksim Lynsha | Belarus | 7.84 | |
| 21 | 3 | Dániel Kiss | Hungary | 7.86 | |
| 21 | 4 | Serhiy Kopanayko | Ukraine | 7.86 | |
| 23 | 2 | Martin Mazáč | Czech Republic | 7.90 | |
| 24 | 2 | Valdó Szűcs | Hungary | 7.97 | |
| 25 | 3 | Rahib Mammadov | Azerbaijan | 8.05 | |
| 26 | 1 | Gerard O'Donnell | Ireland | 8.06 | |
| 26 | 4 | Andrej Bician | Slovakia | 8.32 | |
| | 1 | Petr Penáz | Czech Republic | DNF | |

=== Semifinals ===
Qualification: First 4 of each semifinal (Q) qualified directly for the final.

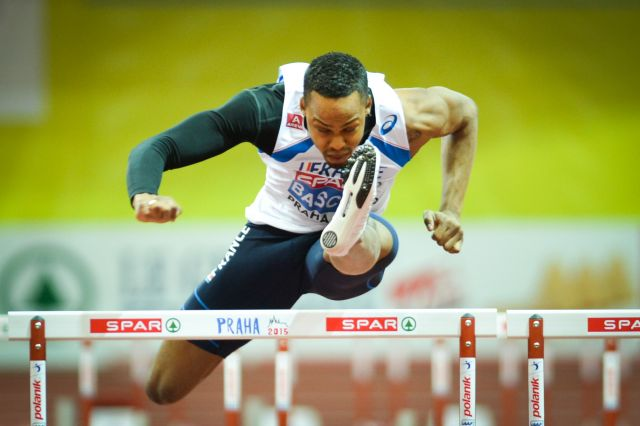
Dimitri Bascou posted the fastest time of the semifinals.

| Rank | Heat | Athlete | Nationality | Time | Note |
|---|---|---|---|---|---|
| 1 | 2 | Dimitri Bascou | France | 7.46 | Q, PB |
| 2 | 1 | Wilhem Belocian | France | 7.53 | Q, =PB |
| 3 | 2 | Pascal Martinot-Lagarde | France | 7.54 | Q, SB |
| 4 | 2 | Erik Balnuweit | Germany | 7.59 | Q, SB |
| 5 | 1 | Petr Svoboda | Czech Republic | 7.61 | Q, SB |
| 6 | 1 | Konstadinos Douvalidis | Greece | 7.62 | Q, SB |
| 7 | 2 | Balázs Baji | Hungary | 7.65 | Q |
| 8 | 2 | Gregory Sedoc | Netherlands | 7.65 | SB |
| 9 | 1 | Lawrence Clarke | Great Britain | 7.66 | Q |
| 10 | 1 | Konstantin Shabanov | Russia | 7.66 | |
| 11 | 1 | João Carlos Almeida | Portugal | 7.68 | |
| 12 | 1 | Damien Broothaerts | Belgium | 7.72 | |
| 13 | 2 | Dominik Bochenek | Poland | 7.73 | |
| 13 | 2 | Andreas Martinsen | Denmark | 7.73 | NR |
| 15 | 1 | Damian Czykier | Poland | 7.75 | |
| 16 | 2 | David Omoregie | Great Britain | 7.76 | |

=== Final ===
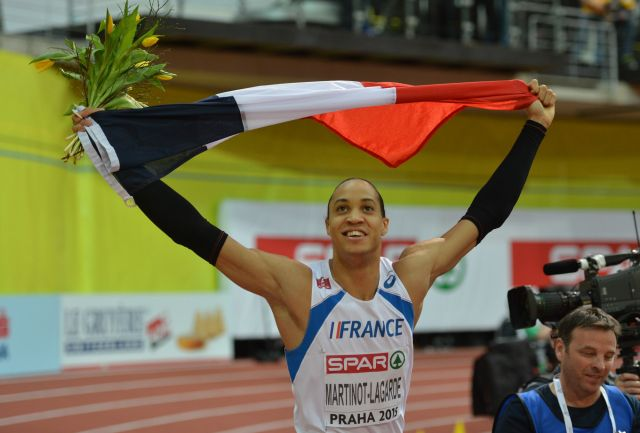
The winner, Pascal Martinot-Lagarde

| Rank | Lane | Athlete | Nationality | Time | Note |
|---|---|---|---|---|---|
| 1st place, gold medalist(s) | 6 | Pascal Martinot-Lagarde | France | 7.49 | SB |
| 2nd place, silver medalist(s) | 5 | Dimitri Bascou | France | 7.50 | |
| 3rd place, bronze medalist(s) | 3 | Wilhem Belocian | France | 7.52 | PB |
| 4 | 8 | Erik Balnuweit | Germany | 7.59 | =SB |
| 5 | 2 | Lawrence Clarke | Great Britain | 7.63 | |
| 6 | 7 | Konstadinos Douvalidis | Greece | 7.64 | |
| 7 | 1 | Balázs Baji | Hungary | 7.65 | |
| 8 | 4 | Petr Svoboda | Czech Republic | 7.67 | |
