= Dairon =

Dairon is a given name. Notable people with the given name include:

- Dairon Asprilla (born 1992), Colombian footballer
- Dairon Blanco (1992–2020), Cuban footballer
- Dairon Mosquera (born 1992), Colombian footballer
- Dairon Pérez (born 1994), Cuban footballer
- Dairon Reyes (born 2003), Cuban footballer
- Dairon Portmann (born 1992), Swiss/German Natural Bodybuilder (World Natural Bodybuilding Federation)

== See also ==
- Dayron, another given name
