= Andreas Kundert =

Swiss hurdler (born 1984)

Andreas Kundert (born 1 October 1984) is a Swiss athlete specialising in the 110 metres hurdles. He represented his country at two World Championships, in 2007 and 2011, without reaching the semifinals.

He has personal bests of 13.41 seconds in the 110 metres hurdles (+0.6 m/s, Luzern 2008) and 7.65 seconds in the 60 metres hurdles (Magglingen 2009). The first one is the current national record.

== Competition record ==
Year	Competition	Venue	Position	Event	Notes
Representing Switzerland
2001	European Youth Olympic Festival	Murcia, Spain	2nd	110 m hrd (91.4 cm)	13.56 (w)
2001	World Youth Championships	Debrecen, Hungary	8th	110 m hrd (91.4 cm)	13.80
2002	World Junior Championships	Kingston, Jamaica	12th (sf)	110 m hurdles	14.75 (wind: +0.2 m/s)
2003	European Junior Championships	Tampere, Finland	2nd	110 m hurdles	14.18
2005	European Indoor Championships	Madrid, Spain	22nd (h)	60 m hurdles	7.88
2005	European U23 Championships	Erfurt, Germany	5th	110 m hurdles	13.77 (w)
2005	Universiade	İzmir, Turkey	8th	110 m hurdles	13.97
2007	European Indoor Championships	Birmingham, United Kingdom	15th (sf)	60 m hurdles	7.95
2007	World Championships	Osaka, Japan	26th (h)	110 m hurdles	13.68
2011	Universiade	Shenzhen, China	9th	110 m hurdles	13.98
2011	World Championships	Daegu, South Korea	28th (h)	110 m hurdles	13.87
