= Damien Broothaerts =

Belgian hurdler

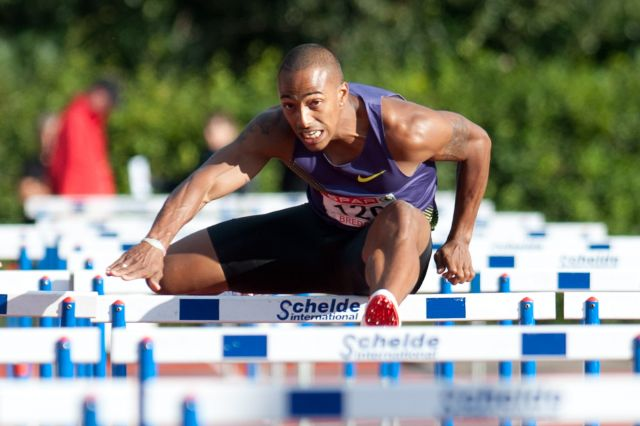
- Damien Broothaerts in 2010

Personal information
- Nationality: Belgian
- Born: 13 March 1983 (age 43) Uccle, Belgium
- Height: 1.79 m (5 ft 10 in)
- Weight: 75 kg (165 lb)

Sport
- Sport: Athletics
- Event: 110 m hurdles/60 m hurdles
- Coached by: Jacques Borlée

Damien Broothaerts (born 13 March 1983 in Uccle) is a Belgian athlete specialising in the sprint hurdles. He represented his country at the 2009 World Championships and 2010 World Indoor Championships.

Apart from hurdling he is a modest sprinter, having won several national titles in the 60 metres and 100 metres events.

On 23 August 2011, he tested positive for an illegal substance, methylhexanamine, and additionally missed three random doping tests within 18 months. For these infringements he was suspended for two years. However, after his appeal his ban was reduced and he was able to compete again since 16 March 2012.

== Competition record ==
Year	Competition	Venue	Position	Event	Notes
Representing Belgium
2002	World Junior Championships	Kingston, Jamaica	17th (h)	110 m hurdles	14.68 (wind: -3.5 m/s)
2003	European U23 Championships	Bydgoszcz, Poland	26th (h)	110 m hurdles	14.24
2005	European U23 Championships	Erfurt, Germany	14th (h)	110 m hurdles	14.05
2005	European U23 Championships	Erfurt, Germany	6th	4 × 100 m relay	40.45
2009	European Indoor Championships	Turin, Italy	7th	60 m hurdles	7.74
2009	World Championships	Berlin, Germany	42nd (h)	110 m hurdles	14.15
2010	World Indoor Championships	Doha, Qatar	18th (sf)	60 m hurdles	7.86
2011	European Indoor Championships	Paris, France	15th (h)	60 m hurdles	7.84
2013	Jeux de la Francophonie	Nice, France	3rd	4 × 100 m relay	39.58
2015	European Indoor Championships	Prague, Czech Republic	12th (sf)	60 m hurdles	7.72
2018	World Masters Championships	Málaga, Spain	1st	M35 110 m hurdles	13.89

== Personal bests ==
Outdoor

- 100 metres – 10.46 (+0.6 m/s) (Oordegem-Lede 2008)
- 200 metres – 21.09 (+1.1 m/s) (Brussels 2004)
- 110 metres hurdles – 13.62 (+1.9 m/s) (Heusden-Zolder 2009)

Indoor

- 60 metres – 6.76 (Ghent 2009)
- 60 metres hurdles – 7.68 (Ghent 2015)
