= Athletics at the 2007 Summer Universiade – Men's 110 metres hurdles =

The men's 110 metres hurdles event at the 2007 Summer Universiade was held on 9–10 August.

== Medalists ==
Gold	Silver	Bronze
Serhiy Demydyuk; Ukraine	Ji Wei; China	Anselmo da Silva; Brazil

== Results ==
=== Heats ===
Qualification: First 3 of each heat (Q) and the next 4 fastest (q) qualified for the semifinals.

Rank	Heat	Name	Nationality	Time	Notes
1	1	Evgeniy Borisov	Russia	13.76	Q
2	3	Yin Jing	China	13.78	Q, PB
3	1	Serhiy Demydyuk	Ukraine	13.79	Q
4	1	James Mortimer	New Zealand	13.81	Q
5	2	Sergey Chepiga	Russia	13.91	Q
5	3	Anselmo da Silva	Brazil	13.91	Q
5	3	Hendrik Kotze	South Africa	13.91	Q
8	2	Ji Wei	China	13.96	Q
9	3	Emanuele Abate	Italy	13.98	q
10	2	William Sharman	Great Britain	14.00	Q
11	4	Éder Antônio Souza	Brazil	14.03	Q
12	2	Maksim Lynsha	Belarus	14.06	q
13	1	Yoichi Iwafune	Japan	14.07	q
14	3	Antti Korkealaakso	Finland	14.12	q
15	1	Claude Godart	Luxembourg	14.14	FS1
15	2	Giannis Lazaridis	Greece	14.14	
17	3	Stephanos Ioannou	Cyprus	14.15	
17	4	Justin Merlino	Australia	14.15	Q
19	4	Michel Ilin	Israel	14.26	Q
20	2	Tarmo Jallai	Estonia	14.28	
20	4	Rene Oruman	Estonia	14.28	
23	2	Rohollah Asgari Gandmani	Iran	14.42	FS1
24	1	Luís Sá	Portugal	14.45	
25	4	Nazar Mukhametzhan	Kazakhstan	14.46	
26	4	Narongdech Janjai	Thailand	14.48	
27	2	Suriya Judasri	Thailand	14.73	PB
28	3	Jorge McFarlane	Peru	14.77	
29	3	Jon Bentsen	Denmark	14.81	
30	4	Mohd Muslim Sidek	Malaysia	15.15	PB
	1	Carlos Eduardo Chinin	Brazil	DNS	
	4	Nguyen Khac Huy	Vietnam	DNS	

=== Semifinals ===
Qualification: First 4 of each semifinal qualified directly (Q) for the final.

Rank	Heat	Name	Nationality	Time	Notes
1	1	Serhiy Demydyuk	Ukraine	13.44	Q
2	1	Evgeniy Borisov	Russia	13.56	Q
3	2	Maksim Lynsha	Belarus	13.68	Q, PB
4	1	Emanuele Abate	Italy	13.70	Q
5	2	Ji Wei	China	13.74	Q
6	1	Éder Antônio Souza	Brazil	13.77	Q
7	2	Anselmo da Silva	Brazil	13.82	Q, FS2
8	1	James Mortimer	New Zealand	13.83	
8	2	Justin Merlino	Australia	13.83	Q
10	1	Yin Jing	China	13.91	
11	2	Sergey Chepiga	Russia	13.93	
12	2	Yoichi Iwafune	Japan	13.98	
13	2	Hendrik Kotze	South Africa	14.00	
14	2	William Sharman	Great Britain	14.05	FS1
15	1	Antti Korkealaakso	Finland	14.06	
16	1	Michel Ilin	Israel	14.24	

=== Final ===
Wind: -0.2 m/s

Rank	Lane	Name	Nationality	Time	Notes
1st place, gold medalist(s)	5	Serhiy Demydyuk	Ukraine	13.33	
2nd place, silver medalist(s)	3	Ji Wei	China	13.57	
3rd place, bronze medalist(s)	1	Anselmo da Silva	Brazil	13.58	
4	7	Emanuele Abate	Italy	13.62	
5	8	Éder Antônio Souza	Brazil	13.62	
6	6	Evgeniy Borisov	Russia	13.63	
7	4	Maksim Lynsha	Belarus	13.66	
8	2	Justin Merlino	Australia	13.91	
