= 2009 European Athletics Indoor Championships – Men's 60 metres hurdles =

The Men's 60 meters hurdles event at the 2009 European Athletics Indoor Championships was held on March 6.

== Medalists ==
Gold	Silver	Bronze
Ladji Doucouré; France	Gregory Sedoc; Netherlands	Petr Svoboda; Czech Republic

== Results ==
=== Heats ===
First 3 of each heat (Q) and the next 4 fastest (q) qualified for the semifinals.

Rank	Heat	Name	Nationality	Time	Notes
1	3	Yevgeniy Borisov	Russia	7.63	Q
2	4	Petr Svoboda	Czech Republic	7.64	Q
3	3	Erik Balnuweit	Germany	7.65	Q
4	1	Gregory Sedoc	Netherlands	7.68	Q
4	2	Helge Schwarzer	Germany	7.68	Q
6	2	Ladji Doucouré	France	7.70	Q
6	4	Willi Mathiszik	Germany	7.70	Q
8	4	Andy Turner	Great Britain	7.73	Q
9	1	Allan Scott	Great Britain	7.75	Q
9	2	Damien Broothaerts	Belgium	7.75	Q
11	2	Jackson Quiñónez	Spain	7.76	q
11	3	Konstadinos Douvalidis	Greece	7.76	Q
13	1	Maksim Lynsha	Belarus	7.77	Q
14	1	Garfield Darien	France	7.78	q
15	3	Jurica Grabušić	Croatia	7.81	q
16	3	Robert Kronberg	Sweden	7.85	q
17	1	Konstantin Shabanov	Russia	7.86	
18	4	Matúš Janeček	Slovakia	7.90	
19	4	Juha Sonck	Finland	7.93	
20	2	Emanuele Abate	Italy	7.94	
20	4	Balázs Baji	Hungary	7.94	
22	3	Adnan Malkić	Bosnia and Herzegovina	7.96	NR
23	1	Jon Yde Bentsen	Denmark	7.98	
24	2	Elton Bitincka	Albania	8.07	
25	1	Michael Illin	Israel	8.12	SB
26	3	Christian Laugesen	Denmark	8.24	
	2	David Ilariani	Georgia	DQ	

=== Semifinals ===
First 4 of each semifinals qualified directly (Q) for the final.

Rank	Heat	Name	Nationality	Time	Notes
1	2	Petr Svoboda	Czech Republic	7.55	Q, =NR
2	2	Ladji Doucouré	France	7.55	Q
3	1	Yevgeniy Borisov	Russia	7.60	Q
4	2	Gregory Sedoc	Netherlands	7.61	Q
5	1	Garfield Darien	France	7.63	Q, =PB
6	2	Andy Turner	Great Britain	7.68	Q
7	2	Willi Mathiszik	Germany	7.70	
8	2	Jackson Quiñónez	Spain	7.71	
9	1	Allan Scott	Great Britain	7.74	Q
10	1	Damien Broothaerts	Belgium	7.74	Q
11	1	Maksim Lynsha	Belarus	7.76	
12	1	Robert Kronberg	Sweden	7.78	
13	1	Erik Balnuweit	Germany	7.79	
14	2	Konstadinos Douvalidis	Greece	7.82	
15	2	Jurica Grabušić	Croatia	7.88	
	1	Helge Schwarzer	Germany	DNF	

=== Final ===
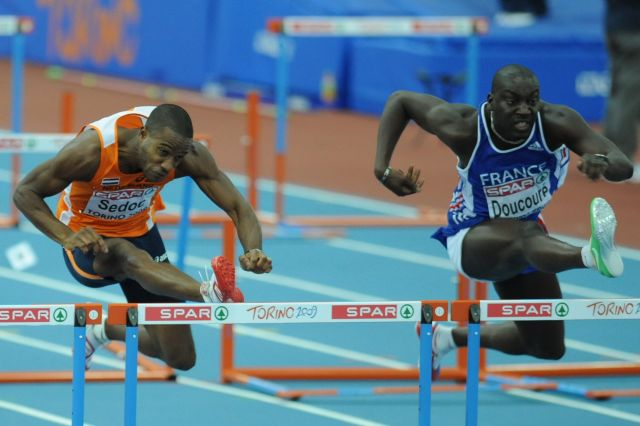
Gregory Sedoc (left) and Ladji Doucouré in the final of the event.

Rank	Name	Nationality	React	Time	Notes
1st place, gold medalist(s)	Ladji Doucouré	France	0.145	7.55	
2nd place, silver medalist(s)	Gregory Sedoc	Netherlands	0.140	7.55	
3rd place, bronze medalist(s)	Petr Svoboda	Czech Republic	0.170	7.61	
4	Andy Turner	Great Britain	0.142	7.62	
5	Yevgeniy Borisov	Russia	0.169	7.64	
6	Garfield Darien	France	0.177	7.66	
7	Damien Broothaerts	Belgium	0.160	7.74	
8	Allan Scott	Great Britain	0.155	7.78	
