= Helge Schwarzer =

German hurdler

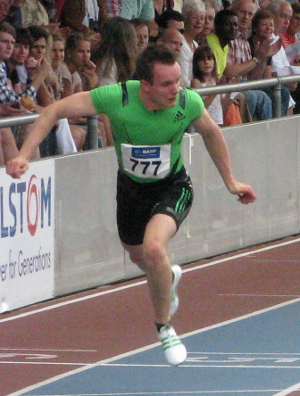
- Helge Schwarzer in 2011

Personal information
- Born: 26 November 1985 Gehrden, West Germany

Sport
- Sport: Athletics
- Event: 110 m hurdles
- Club: Hamburger SV

Helge Schwarzer (born 26 November 1985 in Gehrden) is a retired German athlete who specialised in the sprint hurdles. He represented his country at one outdoor and two indoor World Championships.

His personal bests are 13.39 seconds in the 110 metres hurdles (+0.7 m/s, Ulm 2009) and 7.58 seconds in the 60 metres hurdles (Kirchberg 2012).

== International competitions ==
Year	Competition	Venue	Position	Event	Notes
Representing Germany
2009	European Indoor Championships	Turin, Italy	4th (h)	60 m hurdles	7.68^{1}
2009	World Championships	Berlin, Germany	23rd (sf)	110 m hurdles	13.72
2010	World Indoor Championships	Doha, Qatar	11th (sf)	60 m hurdles	7.74
2012	World Indoor Championships	Helsinki, Finland	11th (sf)	60 m hurdles	7.75

^{1}Did not finish in the semifinals
