= Petr Svoboda (hurdler) =

Czech hurdler

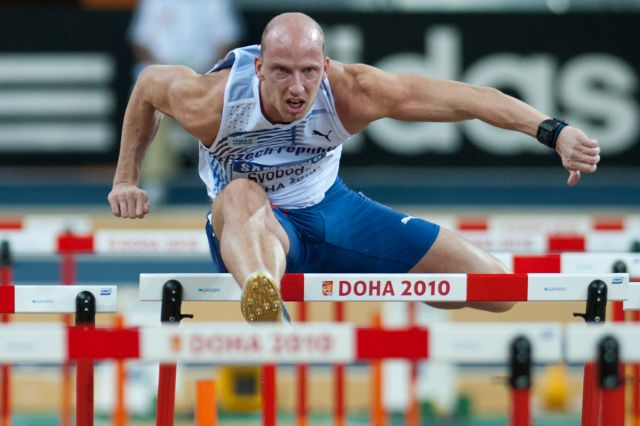
- Svoboda at the 2010 World Indoor Championships in Doha

Medal record

Men's athletics

Representing Czech Republic

European Indoor Championships
Gold medal – first place	2011 Paris	60 m hurdles
Bronze medal – third place	2009 Turin	60 m hurdles
Bronze medal – third place	2017 Belgrade	60 m hurdles

Petr Svoboda (Czech pronunciation: [ˈpɛtr̩ ˈsvoboda]; born 10 October 1984 in Třebíč) is a Czech track and field athlete, competing in the sprint hurdles. He holds national records in both 110 metres hurdles (13.27, 2010) and 60 metres hurdles (7.44, 2010). On 6 March he won a bronze medal at the 2009 European Indoor Championships in Turin.

== Biography ==
After breaking the national record for the 110m hurdles, he went to the 2010 European Athletics Championships in Barcelona later that year as one of the favourites. However, the gold went to Andy Turner as Svoboda, having led with 30 metres to go, collided badly with a hurdle, and went on to finish in a disappointing 6th place. On 4 March 2011, Svoboda won the gold medal in the 60m hurdles at the 2011 European Athletics Indoor Championships. Although Turner decided against competing, Svoboda beat Frenchman Garfield Darien who has to settle for a second silver to match the one he won in Barcelona.

On 21 September 2012 he married the pole vaulter Jiřina Ptáčníková, however the couple divorced in 2014.

In 2011, Svoboda suffered a heel injury, which interrupted his career for next three years. In May 2014, he announced return to professional athletics.

== Achievements ==
Year	Competition	Venue	Position	Event	Notes
2001	World Youth Championships	Debrecen, Hungary	26th (q)	Long jump	6.71 m
2002	World Junior Championships	Kingston, Jamaica	36th (h)	100 m	10.79 (wind: +1.5 m/s)
2002	World Junior Championships	Kingston, Jamaica	—	110 m hurdles	DNF
2003	European Junior Championships	Tampere, Finland	11th (sf)	110 m hurdles	14.60
2005	European Indoor Championships	Madrid, Spain	–	Heptathlon	DNF
2005	European U23 Championships	Erfurt, Germany	17th (sf)	110 m hurdles	14.19 w (wind: +2.3 m/s)
2007	European Indoor Championships	Birmingham, United Kingdom	11th (sf)	60 m hurdles	7.80
2008	World Indoor Championships	Valencia, Spain	16th (sf)	60 m hurdles	7.81
2008	Olympic Games	Beijing, China	14th (sf)	110 m hurdles	13.60
2009	European Indoor Championships	Turin, Italy	3rd	60 m hurdles	7.61
2009	World Championships	Berlin, Germany	6th	110 m hurdles	13.38
2010	World Indoor Championships	Doha, Qatar	5th	60 m hurdles	7.58
2010	European Championships	Barcelona, Spain	6th	110 m hurdles	13.57
2011	European Indoor Championships	Paris, France	1st	60 m hurdles	7.49
2014	European Championships	Zurich, Switzerland	5th	110 m hurdles	13.63
2015	European Indoor Championships	Prague, Czech Republic	8th	60 m hurdles	7.67
2015	World Championships	Beijing, China	23rd (sf)	110 m hurdles	13.67
2016	Olympic Games	Rio de Janeiro, Brazil	18th (sf)	110 m hurdles	13.67
2017	European Indoor Championships	Belgrade, Serbia	3rd	60 m hurdles	7.53
2018	World Indoor Championships	Birmingham, United Kingdom	11th (sf)	60 m hurdles	7.64
2022	World Indoor Championships	Belgrade, Serbia	23rd (sf)	60 m hurdles	7.71
2022	World Championships	Eugene, United States	28th (h)	110 m hurdles	13.65
2024	World Indoor Championships	Glasgow, United Kingdom	–	60 m hurdles	DNF
