= Maksim Lynsha =

Belarusian hurdler

Maksim Leanidavich Lynsha (Belarusian: Максім Леанідавіч Лынша, born 6 April 1985 in Hantsavichy) is a Belarusian athlete specializing in the 110 meters hurdles.

== Competition record ==
Year	Competition	Venue	Position	Event	Notes
Representing Belarus
2003	European Junior Championships	Tampere, Finland	4th	110 m hurdles	14.28
2004	World Junior Championships	Grosseto, Italy	9th (sf)	110 m hurdles	14.12 (wind: -0.3 m/s)
2005	European U23 Championships	Erfurt, Germany	7th	110 m hurdles	14.52
2005	Universiade	İzmir, Turkey	19th (h)	110 m hurdles	14.23
2006	World Indoor Championships	Moscow, Russia	36th (h)	60 m	6.85
2007	European Indoor Championships	Birmingham, United Kingdom	8th	60 m hurdles	8.04
2007	European U23 Championships	Debrecen, Hungary	5th	110 m hurdles	13.82
2007	Universiade	Bangkok, Thailand	7th	110 m hurdles	13.66
2008	World Indoor Championships	Valencia, Spain	24th (sf)	60 m hurdles	8.03
2008	Olympic Games	Beijing, China	33rd (h)	110 m hurdles	13.86
2009	European Indoor Championships	Turin, Italy	11th (sf)	60 m hurdles	7.76
2009	World Championships	Berlin, Germany	14th (sf)	110 m hurdles	13.46
2010	World Indoor Championships	Doha, Qatar	11th (sf)	60 m hurdles	7.71
2010	European Championships	Barcelona, Spain	9th (sf)	110 m hurdles	13.68
2011	European Indoor Championships	Paris, France	10th (h)	60 m hurdles	7.71
2012	World Indoor Championships	Istanbul, Turkey	10th (sf)	60 m hurdles	7.74
2012	Olympic Games	London, United Kingdom	15th (sf)	110 m hurdles	13.45
2013	European Indoor Championships	Gothenburg, Sweden	6th	60 m hurdles	7.58
2015	European Indoor Championships	Prague, Czech Republic	20th (h)	60 m hurdles	7.84
2016	World Indoor Championships	Portland, United States	20th (h)	60 m hurdles	7.77

== Personal bests ==
Outdoors

- 100m – 10.62 (-1.5 m/s) (Grodno 2008)
- 200m – 21.16 (+1.1 m/s) (Prague 2006)
- 110m hurdles – 13.36 (+0.3 m/s) (Albi 2012)

Indoors

- 60m – 6.60 (Mogilev 2008)
- 200m – 21.59 (Mogilev 2006)
- 60m hurdles – 7.58 (Gothenburg 2013)
