= Athletics at the 2011 Summer Universiade – Men's 110 metres hurdles =

The men's 110 metres hurdles event at the 2011 Summer Universiade was held on 19–20 August.

== Medalists ==
Gold	Silver	Bronze
Hansle Parchment; Jamaica	Jiang Fan; China	Ronald Brookins; United States

== Results ==
=== Heats ===
Qualification: First 4 of each heat (Q) and the next 4 fastest (q) qualified for the semifinals.

Wind:
Heat 1: +0.2 m/s, Heat 2: 0.0 m/s, Heat 3: -1.4 m/s, Heat 4: +0.6 m/s, Heat 5: -1.8 m/s

Rank	Heat	Name	Nationality	Time	Notes
1	1	Gianni Frankis	Great Britain	13.66	Q
2	1	Jiang Fan	China	13.69	Q
3	2	Ronald Brookins	United States	13.70	Q
4	2	Emanuele Abate	Italy	13.78	Q
5	4	Balázs Baji	Hungary	13.86	Q
6	3	Hansle Parchment	Jamaica	13.88	Q
7	1	Lyes Mokddel	Algeria	13.91	Q, PB
8	2	Martin Mazáč	Czech Republic	13.92	Q
9	4	Dimitri Bascou	France	13.93	Q
10	5	Greggmar Swift	Barbados	13.94	Q
11	5	Andreas Kundert	Switzerland	13.99	Q
12	1	Wataru Yazawa	Japan	14.01	Q
13	5	Samuel Coco-Viloin	France	14.03	Q
14	1	Ronald Bennett	Honduras	14.03	q, SB
15	2	Alexandros Stavrides	Cyprus	14.05	Q
16	4	Vladimir Vukicevic	Norway	14.08	Q
17	5	Brendan Ames	United States	14.10	Q
18	3	João Almeida	Portugal	14.13	Q
19	3	Jorge McFarlane	Peru	14.16	Q
20	1	Mantas Šilkauskas	Lithuania	14.19	q
21	2	Michael Page	Switzerland	14.31	q
21	4	Surendhar Jayakumar	India	14.31	Q, PB
23	4	Serhiy Kopanayko	Ukraine	14.36	q
24	3	Ahmad Hazer	Lebanon	14.47	Q
25	3	Kārlis Daube	Latvia	14.48	
26	5	Jon Bentsen	Denmark	14.58	
27	5	Ernesto Stanley	Paraguay	14.64	=NR
28	4	Jonathan Pengel	Netherlands	14.66	
29	1	Javier McFarlane	Peru	14.71	
30	2	Iong Kim Fai	Macau	15.29	
31	2	Mohammed Ali Sufyani	Saudi Arabia	15.86	
32	3	Sherman Fernando	Sri Lanka	16.14	
	3	Aleksey Dremin	Russia	DQ	FS
	4	Yin Jing	China	DNS	
	5	Jamras Rittidet	Thailand	DNS	

=== Semifinals ===
Qualification: First 2 of each semifinal (Q) and the next 2 fastest (q) qualified for the final.

Wind:
Heat 1: -0.7 m/s, Heat 2: +0.2 m/s, Heat 3: -1.0 m/s

Rank	Heat	Name	Nationality	Time	Notes
1	3	Hansle Parchment	Jamaica	13.56	Q
2	1	Dimitri Bascou	France	13.62	Q
2	2	Jiang Fan	China	13.62	Q
4	2	Balázs Baji	Hungary	13.64	Q
5	2	Ronald Brookins	United States	13.65	q
6	3	Emanuele Abate	Italy	13.75	Q
7	1	Jorge McFarlane	Peru	13.81	Q
8	1	Andreas Kundert	Switzerland	13.86	q
9	3	Greggmar Swift	Barbados	13.90	
10	3	Brendan Ames	United States	13.91	
11	2	Samuel Coco-Viloin	France	13.93	
12	3	João Almeida	Portugal	13.95	
13	2	Wataru Yazawa	Japan	13.97	
14	1	Lyes Mokddel	Algeria	13.99	
15	2	Ronald Bennett	Honduras	14.06	
16	2	Alexandros Stavrides	Cyprus	14.09	
17	1	Vladimir Vukicevic	Norway	14.20	
18	3	Michael Page	Switzerland	14.23	
19	3	Martin Mazáč	Czech Republic	14.25	
20	1	Surendhar Jayakumar	India	14.27	PB
21	1	Serhiy Kopanayko	Ukraine	14.32	
22	3	Ahmad Hazer	Lebanon	14.46	
	1	Gianni Frankis	Great Britain		q
	2	Mantas Šilkauskas	Lithuania	DNS	

=== Final ===
Wind: -0.3 m/s

Rank	Lane	Name	Nationality	Time	Notes
1st place, gold medalist(s)	6	Hansle Parchment	Jamaica	13.24	PB
2nd place, silver medalist(s)	7	Jiang Fan	China	13.55	
3rd place, bronze medalist(s)	3	Ronald Brookins	United States	13.56	
4	5	Dimitri Bascou	France	13.60	
5	9	Emanuele Abate	Italy	13.63	
6	4	Balázs Baji	Hungary	13.71	
7	1	Gianni Frankis	Great Britain	13.79	
8	8	Jorge McFarlane	Peru	13.82	
9	2	Andreas Kundert	Switzerland	13.98	
