= 2007 European Athletics Indoor Championships – Men's 60 metres hurdles =

The men's 60 metres hurdles event at the 2007 European Athletics Indoor Championships was held on March 2.

== Medalists ==
| Gold | Silver | Bronze |
|---|---|---|
| Gregory Sedoc; Netherlands | Marcel van der Westen; Netherlands | Jackson Quiñónez; Spain |

== Results ==
=== Heats ===
First 3 of each heat (Q) and the next 4 fastest (q) qualified for the semifinals.

| Rank | Heat | Name | Nationality | Time | Notes |
|---|---|---|---|---|---|
| 1 | 2 | Jackson Quiñónez | Spain | 7.60 | Q |
| 1 | 3 | Andy Turner | Great Britain | 7.60 | Q |
| 3 | 3 | Marcel van der Westen | Netherlands | 7.62 | Q, =PB |
| 4 | 4 | Yevgeniy Borisov | Russia | 7.68 | Q |
| 5 | 1 | Gregory Sedoc | Netherlands | 7.69 | Q |
| 6 | 2 | Elmar Lichtenegger | Austria | 7.70 | Q, SB |
| 7 | 1 | Petr Svoboda | Czech Republic | 7.73 | Q |
| 7 | 4 | Maksim Lynsha | Belarus | 7.73 | Q |
| 9 | 2 | Stanislav Olijar | Latvia | 7.75 | Q |
| 10 | 1 | Serhiy Demydyuk | Ukraine | 7.77 | Q |
| 10 | 4 | Robert Kronberg | Sweden | 7.77 | Q |
| 12 | 1 | Damjan Zlatnar | Slovenia | 7.78 | q |
| 13 | 2 | Allan Scott | Great Britain | 7.81 | q |
| 14 | 3 | Andreas Kundert | Switzerland | 7.83 | Q |
| 14 | 3 | Cédric Lavanne | France | 7.83 | q |
| 16 | 4 | Dániel Kiss | Hungary | 7.90 | q |
| 17 | 3 | Alexandru Mihailescu | Romania | 7.93 | |
| 17 | 4 | Samuel Coco-Viloin | France | 7.93 | |
| 19 | 2 | René Oruman | Estonia | 7.94 | |
| 20 | 1 | Bano Traore | France | 7.97 | |
| 21 | 2 | David Ilariani | Georgia | 7.98 | |
| 22 | 2 | Yakov Petrov | Russia | 8.01 | |
| 23 | 4 | Elton Bitincka | Albania | 8.04 | |
| 24 | 3 | Michael Illin | Israel | 8.05 | |
| 25 | 1 | Panayiotis Ioannou | Cyprus | 8.09 | |
| 26 | 1 | Claude Godart | Luxembourg | 8.13 | |
| | 3 | Miroslav Novaković | Serbia | DNF | |

=== Semifinals ===
First 4 of each semifinals qualified directly (Q) for the final.

| Rank | Heat | Name | Nationality | Time | Notes |
|---|---|---|---|---|---|
| 1 | 2 | Marcel van der Westen | Netherlands | 7.62 | Q, PB |
| 2 | 1 | Gregory Sedoc | Netherlands | 7.63 | Q, PB |
| 3 | 1 | Jackson Quiñónez | Spain | 7.63 | Q |
| 4 | 1 | Allan Scott | Great Britain | 7.64 | Q, SB |
| 4 | 2 | Serhiy Demydyuk | Ukraine | 7.64 | Q |
| 6 | 2 | Andy Turner | Great Britain | 7.66 | Q |
| 7 | 2 | Robert Kronberg | Sweden | 7.66 | Q |
| 8 | 2 | Yevgeniy Borisov | Russia | 7.67 | |
| 9 | 1 | Maksim Lynsha | Belarus | 7.72 | Q |
| 10 | 1 | Stanislav Olijar | Latvia | 7.76 | |
| 11 | 1 | Petr Svoboda | Czech Republic | 7.80 | |
| 12 | 2 | Elmar Lichtenegger | Austria | 7.83 | |
| 13 | 2 | Damjan Zlatnar | Slovenia | 7.85 | |
| 14 | 2 | Cédric Lavanne | France | 7.88 | |
| 15 | 1 | Andreas Kundert | Switzerland | 7.95 | |
| 16 | 1 | Dániel Kiss | Hungary | 8.05 | |

=== Final ===
| Rank | Name | Nationality | Time | Notes |
|---|---|---|---|---|
| 1st place, gold medalist(s) | Gregory Sedoc | Netherlands | 7.63 | =PB |
| 2nd place, silver medalist(s) | Marcel van der Westen | Netherlands | 7.64 | |
| 3rd place, bronze medalist(s) | Jackson Quiñónez | Spain | 7.65 | |
| 4 | Andy Turner | Great Britain | 7.67 | |
| 5 | Serhiy Demydyuk | Ukraine | 7.68 | |
| 6 | Allan Scott | Great Britain | 7.71 | |
| 7 | Robert Kronberg | Sweden | 7.71 | |
| 8 | Maksim Lynsha | Belarus | 8.04 | |
