= Evgeniy Borisov =

Russian hurdler

Medal record

Representing Russia

Men's athletics

World Indoor Championships
Bronze medal – third place	2008 Valencia	60 m hurdles

Evgeniy Valeryevich Borisov (Russian: Евгений Валерьевич Борисов; born 7 March 1984) is a Russian hurdler. He placed third at the 60 metres hurdles at the 2008 World Indoor Championships in Valencia alongside Staņislavs Olijars. His personal best in the 60 m hurdles came at the 2008 European Athletics Indoor Cup in Moscow when he won the event in 7.44, breaking his previous best by 0.14 seconds. This put him 22nd on the all-time list. His 110 metres hurdles best is 13.55.

== Competition record ==
Year	Competition	Venue	Position	Event	Notes
Representing Russia
2003	European Junior Championships	Tampere, Finland	18th (h)	110 m hurdles	15.26
2005	European U23 Championships	Erfurt, Germany	8th (h)	110 m hurdles	13.97 (wind: +0.1 m/s)
2005	Universiade	İzmir, Turkey	5th (sf)	110 m hurdles	13.73
2006	World Indoor Championships	Moscow, Russia	13th (sf)	60 m hurdles	7.74
2006	European Championships	Gothenburg, Sweden	26th (h)	110 m hurdles	13.97
2007	European Indoor Championships	Birmingham, United Kingdom	8th (sf)	60 m hurdles	7.67
2007	Universiade	Bangkok, Thailand	6th	110 m hurdles	13.63
2008	World Indoor Championships	Valencia, Spain	3rd	60 m hurdles	7.60
2008	Olympic Games	Beijing, China	35th (h)	110 m hurdles	13.90
2009	European Indoor Championships	Turin, Italy	5th	60 m hurdles	7.64
2009	World Championships	Berlin, Germany	21st (sf)	110 m hurdles	13.63
2010	World Indoor Championships	Doha, Qatar	4th	60 m hurdles	7.51
2011	European Indoor Championships	Paris, France	7th	60 m hurdles	7.65
2012	World Indoor Championships	Istanbul, Turkey	20th (h)	60 m hurdles	7.88

== See also ==
- List of IAAF World Indoor Championships medalists (men)
