= Adrien Deghelt =

Belgian hurdler

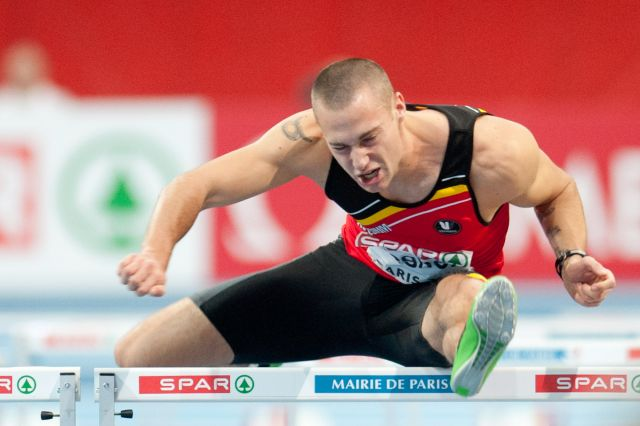

Personal information
- Born: 10 May 1985 (age 41)
Medal record
Men's athletics
Representing Belgium
European Indoor Championships
Bronze medal – third place	2011 Paris	60 m hurdles

Adrien Deghelt (born 10 May 1985) is a Belgian hurdler.

== Biography ==
As a junior Deghelt won the silver medal at the 2007 European U23 Championships. He competed at the 2007 World Championships, the 2008 World Indoor Championships, the 2009 World Championships and the 2010 World Indoor Championships without reaching the final. He then won the bronze medal at the 2011 European Indoor Championships.

Deghelt's personal best is 13.42 seconds, achieved in August 2012 in London. In the 60 metres hurdles he achieved 7.57 seconds at the 2011 European Indoor Championships.

He is coached by Jonathan Nsenga.
