= Samuel Coco-Viloin =

French hurdler

Samuel Coco-Viloin (born 19 October 1987 in Conflans-Sainte-Honorine) is a track and field hurdler who competes internationally for France.

Coco-Viloin represented France at the 2008 Summer Olympics in Beijing. He competed at the 4 × 100 metres relay together with Martial Mbandjock, Manuel Reynaert and Yannick Lesourd. In their qualification heat they placed sixth in a time of 39.53 seconds and they were eliminated.

== Major competitions record ==
Year	Competition	Venue	Position	Event	Notes
Representing France
2006	World Junior Championships	Beijing, China	2nd	110 m hurdles (99.0 cm)	13.35 (wind: +1.5 m/s)
2007	European Indoor Championships	Birmingham, United Kingdom	17th (h)	60 m hurdles	7.93
2008	World Indoor Championships	Valencia, Spain	20th (sf)	60 m hurdles	7.93
2008	Olympic Games	Beijing, China	15th (sf)	110 m hurdles	13.65
2008	Olympic Games	Beijing, China	10th (sf)	4 × 100 m relay	39.53
2009	Universiade	Belgrade, Serbia	10th (sf)	110 m hurdles	13.95
2009	European U23 Championships	Kaunas, Lithuania	6th	110 m hurdles	13.96 (wind: -0.7 m/s)
2011	European Indoor Championships	Paris, France	8th	60 m hurdles	8.08
2011	Universiade	Shenzhen, China	11th (sf)	110 m hurdles	13.93
2013	Jeux de la Francophonie	Nice, France	4th	110 m hurdles	14.14

== Bibliography ==
- Samuel Coco-Viloin at World Athletics
