= Barbados at the 2009 World Championships in Athletics =

- WA code: BAR

in Berlin
- Competitors: 4 (3 men, 1 women)
- Medals: Gold 1 Silver 0 Bronze 0 Total 1

World Championships in Athletics appearances
- 1983; 1987; 1991; 1993; 1995; 1997; 1999; 2001; 2003; 2005; 2007; 2009; 2011; 2013; 2015; 2017; 2019; 2022; 2023

Barbados competes at the 2009 World Championships in Athletics from 15 to 23 August in Berlin.

== Team selection ==
Event	Athletes	
Event	Men	Women
100 metres	Ramon Gittens; Andrew Hinds	Jade Bailey
200 metres	Ramon Gittens; Andrew Hinds	Jade Bailey
110 metre hurdles	Ryan Brathwaite	

== Results ==
=== Men ===
Event	Athletes	Heats		Quarterfinals		Semifinal		Final	
Event	Athletes	Result	Rank	Result	Rank	Result	Rank	Result	Rank
100 m	Ramon Gittens	10.47	46	did not advance					
100 m	Andrew Hinds	10.30	16	10.23	21	did not advance			
200 m	Ramon Gittens	21.33	44	did not advance					
200 m	Andrew Hinds	22.60	58	did not advance					
110 m hurdles	Ryan Brathwaite	13.35	2	-		13.18 NR	1	13.14 NR	Gold medal

=== Women ===
Event	Athletes	Heats		Quarterfinals		Semifinal		Final	
Event	Athletes	Result	Rank	Result	Rank	Result	Rank	Result	Rank
100 m	Jade Bailey								
200 m	Jade Bailey	23.84	37	-		did not advance			
