= 2005 European Athletics U23 Championships – Men's 110 metres hurdles =

The men's 110 metres hurdles event at the 2005 European Athletics U23 Championships was held in Erfurt, Germany, at Steigerwaldstadion on 15 and 17 July.

== Medalists ==
Gold	David Hughes; United Kingdom
Silver	Willi Mathiszik; Germany
Bronze	Stanislav Sajdok; Czech Republic

== Results ==
=== Final ===
17 July
Wind: 2.9 m/s

Rank	Name	Nationality	Time	Notes
1st place, gold medalist(s)	David Hughes	United Kingdom	13.56 w	
2nd place, silver medalist(s)	Willi Mathiszik	Germany	13.58 w	
3rd place, bronze medalist(s)	Stanislav Sajdok	Czech Republic	13.66 w	
4	William Sharman	United Kingdom	13.72 w	
5	Andreas Kundert	Switzerland	13.77 w	
6	Andrei Shalonka	Belarus	14.02 w	
7	Maksim Lynsha	Belarus	14.52 w	
	Bano Traoré	France	DNF	

=== Heats ===
15 July
Qualified: first 2 in each heat and 2 best to the Final

==== Heat 1 ====
Wind: 2.3 m/s

Rank	Name	Nationality	Time	Notes
1	Maksim Lynsha	Belarus	13.70 w	Q
2	David Hughes	United Kingdom	13.73 w	Q
3	Bano Traoré	France	13.82 w	q
4	Kai Doskoczynski	Germany	14.01 w	
5	Aleksey Davydikov	Russia	14.01 w	
6	Petr Svoboda	Czech Republic	14.19 w	
7	René Oruman	Estonia	14.35 w	
8	Joan Estruch	Spain	14.53 w	

==== Heat 2 ====
Wind: 0.1 m/s

Rank	Name	Nationality	Time	Notes
1	Willi Mathiszik	Germany	13.75	Q
2	Stanislav Sajdok	Czech Republic	13.94	Q
3	William Sharman	United Kingdom	13.94	q
4	Damir Haračić	Bosnia and Herzegovina	13.97	
5	Yevgeniy Borisov	Russia	13.97	
6	Markus Vilén	Finland	14.07	
7	Cédric Beyera	France	14.10	
8	Cristian Cristelotti	Italy	14.34	

==== Heat 3 ====
Wind: -0.6 m/s

Rank	Name	Nationality	Time	Notes
1	Andreas Kundert	Switzerland	14.01	Q
2	Andrei Shalonka	Belarus	14.03	Q
3	Jens Werrmann	Germany	14.05	
4	Damien Broothaerts	Belgium	14.05	
5	Iban Maiza	Spain	14.30	
6	Antti Korkealaakso	Finland	14.32	
7	Thomas Ravon	France	14.36	
8	Rafał Niedzielski	Poland	14.42	

== Participation ==
According to an unofficial count, 24 athletes from 14 countries participated in the event.

- Belarus (2)
- Belgium (1)
- Bosnia and Herzegovina (1)
- Czech Republic (2)
- Estonia (1)
- Finland (2)
- France (3)
- Germany (3)
- Italy (1)
- Poland (1)
- Russia (2)
- Spain (2)
- Switzerland (1)
- United Kingdom (2)
