= Ladji Doucouré =

French track and field athlete

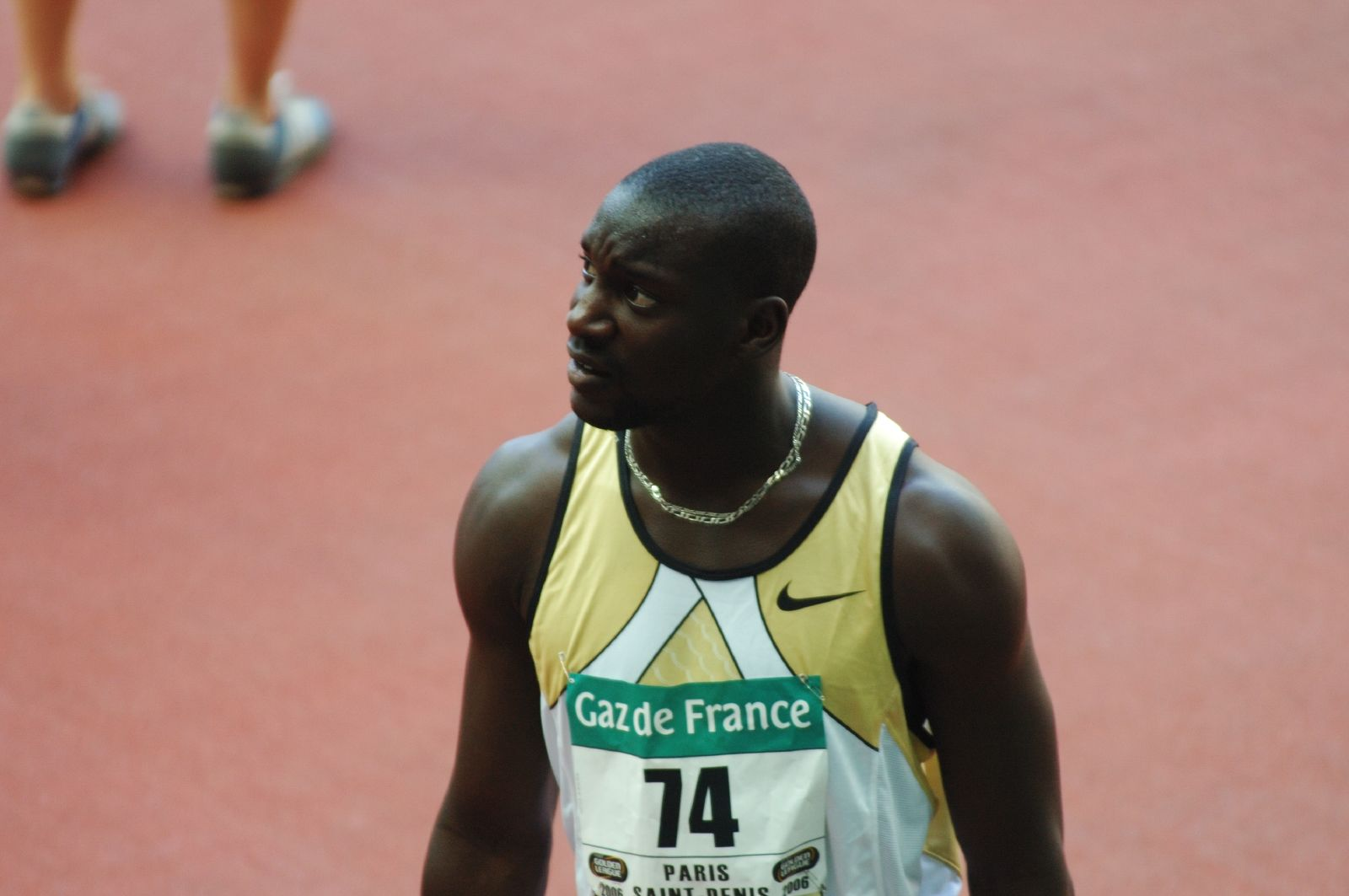
- Doucouré at the 2006 Meeting Gaz de France

Personal information
- Nationality: French
- Born: 28 March 1983 (age 43) Juvisy-sur-Orge, department of Essonne in France
- Height: 1.83 m (6 ft 0 in)
- Weight: 75 kg (165 lb)

Sport
- Sport: hurdling and sprinting

Achievements and titles
- Personal bests: 110 m hurdles (outdoor): 12.97 s (Angers, 2005)(+1.0); 60 m hurdles (indoor): 7.42 s (Liévin, 2005)
Medal record
Men's athletics
Representing France
World Championships
| Gold medal – first place | 2005 Helsinki | 110 m hurdles |
| Gold medal – first place | 2005 Helsinki | 4 × 100 m relay |
European Indoor Championships
| Gold medal – first place | 2005 Madrid | 60 m hurdles |
| Gold medal – first place | 2009 Turin | 60 m hurdles |
Jeux de la Francophonie
| Silver medal – second place | 2013 Nice | 110 m hurdles |
World Junior Championships
| Silver medal – second place | 2000 Santiago | 4 × 100 m relay |
| Bronze medal – third place | 2000 Santiago | 110 m hurdles |
World Youth Championships
| Gold medal – first place | 1999 Bydgoszcz | 110 m hurdles |
European U23 Championships
| Gold medal – first place | 2003 Bydgoszcz | 110 m hurdles |
European Junior Championships
| Silver medal – second place | 2001 Grosseto | 4 × 100 m relay |

Ladji Doucouré (born 28 March 1983) is a French track and field athlete.

== Biography ==
Ladji Doucouré's father and mother were Malian and Senegalese respectively. Ladji Doucouré was a football player and decathlete before specializing in hurdling and sprinting. His cousin Abdoulaye Doucouré is a French-Malian footballer.

== Career ==
Doucouré finished fourth in the 60 m hurdles final at the 2003 World Indoor Championships. He was eliminated in the 110 m hurdles semi-finals of the 2003 World Championships, his debut appearance in a World Championships. Doucouré competed in only one event – the 110 m hurdles – at the 2004 Olympics, his first Olympic Games. He had the fastest time among all the competitors in each of the first two rounds and in the semi-finals. But he finished eighth and last in the final in a time of 13.76 s; he was actually in second place before clipping the last hurdle.

Doucouré won the 60 m hurdles gold medal at the 2005 European Indoor Championships, his first European Championships, Olympic Games or World Championships medal at the senior level. At the French Athletics Outdoor Championships held in Angers on 15 July 2005, Doucouré won the 110 m hurdles for the second consecutive year in a time of 12.97 s, setting a new national outdoor record and becoming he first French athlete to go under 13 seconds in that event. It was the world's best performance that year. At the 2005 World Championships, Doucouré won the 110 m hurdles gold medal in a time of 13:07 s, beating 2004 Olympic Champion Liu Xiang by one hundredth of a second and veteran Allen Johnson by three hundredths of a second. He (together with Ronald Pognon, Eddy De Lépine and Lueyi Dovy) also won the gold medal in the 4 × 100 metres relay event at the same championships. He was named the 2005 L'Équipe Champion of Champions (France category) for his outstanding performance on the track that year.

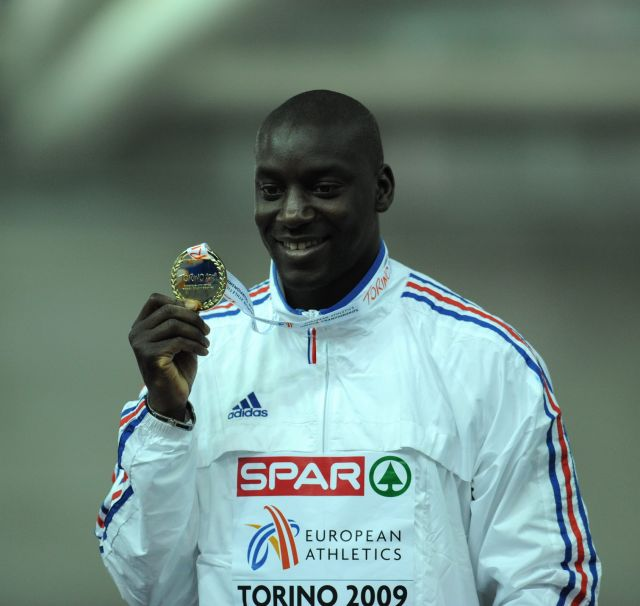
Doucouré with his gold medal from Turin

Doucouré was eliminated in the 110 m hurdles semi-finals of the 2007 World Championships. Doucouré finished fourth in the final of the 110 m hurdles (his only event) at the 2008 Olympics in Beijing. The following year, he started strongly by winning the 60 m hurdles gold medal at the 2009 European Indoor Championships. At the 2012 Olympics in London, he finished last in his semi-final heat of the 110 m hurdles – the only event that he entered – and thus did not qualify for the final.

== Results in the finals of international competitions ==
- Note: Only the position and time in the final are indicated

| Year | Competition | Venue | Position | Notes |
|---|---|---|---|---|
| 1999 | World Youth Championships | Bydgoszcz, Poland | 1st | 110 m hurdles – 13.26s |
| 2000 | World Junior Championships | Santiago, Chile | 3rd | 110 m hurdles – 13.84s |
| 2000 | World Junior Championships | Santiago, Chile | 2nd | 4 × 100 m relay – 39.33s |
| 2001 | European Junior Championships | Grosseto, Italy | 2nd | 4 × 100 m relay – 39.76s |
| 2003 | European U23 Championships | Bydgoszcz, Poland | 1st | 110 m hurdles – 13.25s |
| 2003 | World Indoor Championships | Birmingham, England | 4th | 60 m hurdles – 7.58s |
| 2003 | European Cup | Florence, Italy | 1st | 110 m hurdles – 13.55s |
| 2003 | European Indoor Cup | Leipzig, Germany | 3rd | 60 m hurdles – 7.77s |
| 2004 | Olympic Games | Athens, Greece | 8th | 110 m hurdles – 13.76s |
| 2005 | European Indoor Championships | Madrid, Spain | 1st | 60 m hurdles – 7.50s |
| 2005 | World Championships | Helsinki, Finland | 1st | 110 m hurdles – 13.07s |
| 2005 | World Championships | Helsinki, Finland | 1st | 4 × 100 m relay – 38.08s |
| 2005 | European Cup | Florence, Italy | 1st | 110 m hurdles – 13.16s |
| 2005 | European Cup | Florence, Italy | 3rd | 4 × 100 m relay – 38.78s |
| 2006 | European Cup | Málaga, Spain | 1st | 110 m hurdles – 13.27s |
| 2006 | European Indoor Cup | Liévin, France | 1st | 60 m hurdles – 7.62s |
| 2007 | European Cup | Munich, Germany | 1st | 110 m hurdles – 13.35s |
| 2008 | Olympic Games | Beijing, China | 4th | 110 m hurdles – 13.24s |
| 2009 | European Indoor Championships | Turin, Italy | 1st | 60 m hurdles – 7.55s |
| 2013 | Jeux de la Francophonie | Nice, France | 2nd | 110 m hurdles – 13.95s |

=== Track records ===
As of 15 September 2024, Doucouré holds the following track records for 110 metres hurdles.

Performances in red text are wind-assisted.

| Location | Time | Windspeed m/s | Date |
|---|---|---|---|
| Angers | 12.97; PB | +1.0 | 15/07/2005 |
| Bydgoszcz | 13.23 | +1.9 | 20/07/2003 |
| Castres | 13.38 | +2.6 | 30/07/2014 |
| Málaga | 13.27 | –1.5 | 29/06/2006 |
| Niort | 13.29 | +1.0 | 05/08/2007 |
| Noisy-le-Grand | 13.14 | +1.5 | 07/06/2005 |
| Oslo | 13.00 | –0.1 | 29/07/2005 |

Achievements
| Preceded by (China) Liu Xiang | Men's 110 m Hurdles Best Year Performance; 2005 | Succeeded by (China) Liu Xiang |
Records
| Preceded by (France) Philippe Tourret | Boys' World Youth Best Holder, 110 metres hurdles 16 July 1999 – 2 October 2004 | Succeeded by (Greece) Konstadinos Douvalidis |
