= Aries Merritt =

American hurdler (born 1985)

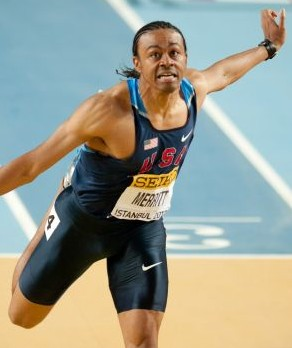
- Merritt at the 2012 IAAF World Indoor Championships

Personal information
- Born: July 24, 1985 (age 41) Chicago, Illinois, U.S.
- Home town: Marietta, Georgia, U.S.
- Height: 6 ft 1 in (185 cm)
- Weight: 158 lb (72 kg)

Sport
- Sport: Running
- Event: Hurdles
- College team: Tennessee Volunteers
Medal record
Men's athletics
Representing the United States
Olympic Games
Gold medal – first place	2012 London	110 m hurdles
World Championships
Bronze medal – third place	2015 Beijing	110 m hurdles
World Indoor Championships
Gold medal – first place	2012 Istanbul	60 m hurdles
World Junior Championships in Athletics
Gold medal – first place	2004 Grosseto	110 m hurdles
- Updated on 28 August 2015

Aries Merritt (born July 24, 1985) is an American track and field athlete who specialized in the 110 metre hurdles. Until June 2026, he held the world record in that event with a time of 12.80 s set on September 7, 2012. He won the gold medal in the 110 metre hurdles at the 2012 Summer Olympics in London.

== Early life and education ==
Born in Chicago, Illinois, he moved to Marietta, Georgia at a young age, attending Joseph Wheeler High School, where he was teammates with Reggie Witherspoon.

Merritt ran for the University of Tennessee from 2003 to 2006 and had a successful college career, a seven-time All-American. He took the 110 meter hurdles gold at the 2004 World Junior Championships and finished sixth at the 2006 World Athletics Final. Also in 2006, he won the NCAA Championships, Indoors and Outdoors and was undefeated in all hurdles events that year. He broke Willie Gault's Tennessee Volunteers hurdles record. His victory at the NCAA Championships in 13.21 s was the second fastest ever collegiate time in the United States, behind only Renaldo Nehemiah.

He reached the World Athletics Final in 2008, finishing in fourth. Merritt is the first hurdler to ever win gold in the US Indoor Championship, the World Indoor Championship (Istanbul, Turkey), the US Olympic Trials, and the Olympic Games all in the same year.

== Professional athletics career ==
=== 2011 ===
In the final of the 110 m hurdles at the 2011 World Championships in Athletics, Merritt was initially classified 6th, with a time of 13.67 s. After Dayron Robles was disqualified, Merritt was promoted to 5th. His season's best was 13.12 s, achieved in Eugene, Oregon and Oslo.

=== 2012 ===
Merritt began the 2012 campaign by altering his approach to the first hurdle, switching from eight to seven steps. In an interview he stated, "[it] was pretty risky to make a change like that, but something had to be done if I was going to compete with (Liu Xiang of China and Dayron Robles of Cuba). The change allows me to maintain my momentum going into the first barrier." Merrit's change was highly successful for the 2012 indoor season as he became the indoor world champion in the 60 meters hurdles at the 2012 World Indoor Championships in Istanbul. In the final, he beat Liu Xiang and Pascal Martinot-Lagarde with a time of 7.44 s.

==== 2012 Summer Olympics ====
At the Olympic trials in Oregon, Merritt won the 110 meter hurdles final in a world leading time of 12.93 s, making the Olympic team for the first time. Merritt subsequently matched the time at two consecutive Diamond League events, at Crystal Palace and Monaco, winning both races.

At the 2012 Olympic Games in London, Merritt began by running the fastest qualifying time in the heats with a time of 13.07 s. In the semi-finals, he was again dominant with a time of 12.94 s. In the final, Dayron Robles and Merritt got the fastest starts but Merritt pulled ahead at hurdle 3. He continued to a personal best of 12.92 s and a 0.12 s win over reigning world champion Jason Richardson.

==== World record ====
On September 7, 2012, at the final Diamond League meet (Memorial Van Damme) in Brussels, Belgium, Merritt ran a time of 12.80 s in the 110 meter hurdles, shattering the previous world record of 12.87 s held by Robles. Merritt's performance was the largest drop in the world record for 110 meter hurdles (0.07 s) since Renaldo Nehemiah in 1981. Merrit ran consistently throughout the 2012 season and held the world record until June 10, 2026, when Ja'Kobe Tharp ran 12.75 during the 2026 NCAA Championship. The following are his times that lead-up to his world record performance in the 110 meter hurdles:

Meet	Date	Time
2012 U.S. Olympic Trials (final)	June 30, 2012	12.93
Aviva London Grand Prix	July 13, 2012	12.93
Herculis	July 20, 2012	12.93
2012 Summer Olympics (final)	August 8, 2012	12.92
Aviva Birmingham Grand Prix	August 26, 2012	12.95
Internationales Stadionfest	September 2, 2012	12.97
Belgacom Memorial Van Damme	September 7, 2012	12.80

=== 2013 ===
Merritt finished 6th at the World Championships. After the competition, he felt very ill and was diagnosed with collapsing focal segmental glomerulosclerosis, a rare congenital kidney disease, aggravated by a parvovirus that had attacked his kidneys and bone marrow. After several months of medical treatment, he was eventually able to return to competition on the following year, albeit far from his previous registers.

=== 2015 ===
Merrit's recovery from his kidney problems was enough to allow him to finish third in the USATF Outdoor Championships in June, obtaining a place for the World Championship. On 28 August he won the bronze medal in the 110 m hurdles, just four days before undergoing a scheduled kidney transplant.

=== 2017 ===
He won the 2017 IAAF Diamond League 110 m hurdles in Rome on June 8, 2017.

=== 2021 ===
Merritt sought to qualify for the pandemic-delayed Tokyo Olympics in 2021 but did not succeed.

== Post-retirement ==
Merritt served as an assistant coach for sprints and hurdles at Brown University 2022–2024. In the fall of 2024 he was hired as an assistant coach at Texas State University.

== Personal bests ==
Event	Best	Location	Date	Note(s)
55 meters hurdles	7.10 s	Gainesville, Florida, United States	January 21, 2006	
60 meters hurdles	7.43 s	Albuquerque, New Mexico, United States	February 26, 2012	
110 meters hurdles	12.80 s	Brussels, Belgium	September 7, 2012	
200 meters	21.46 s	Bloomington, Indiana, United States	January 7, 2006	
400 meters hurdles	51.94 s	Knoxville, Tennessee, United States	April 9, 2004	

=== International competition record ===
Year	Competition	Venue	Position	Event	Notes
Representing United States
2004	World Junior Championships	Grosseto, Italy	1st	110 m hurdles	13.56 (wind: -0.6 m/s)
2009	World Championships	Berlin, Germany	27th (h)	110 m hurdles	13.70
2011	World Championships	Daegu, South Korea	5th	110 m hurdles	13.67
2012	World Indoor Championships	Istanbul, Turkey	1st	60 m hurdles	7.44
2012	Olympic Games	London, United Kingdom	1st	110 m hurdles	12.92
2013	World Championships	Moscow, Russia	6th	110 m hurdles	13.31
2015	World Championships	Beijing, China	3rd	110 m hurdles	13.04
2017	World Championships	London, United Kingdom	5th	110 m hurdles	13.31
2018	World Indoor Championships	Birmingham, United Kingdom	4th	60 m hurdles	7.56

Records
Preceded by Dayron Robles	Men's 110 m hurdles world record holder September 7, 2012 – present	Succeeded by Incumbent
