= Dayron Capetillo =

Cuban hurdler

Personal information
- Born: 11 September 1987

Sport
- Sport: Athletics
- Event: 110 m hurdles

Dayron Capetillo (born 11 September 1987) is a retired Cuban athlete who specialised in the sprint hurdles. He represented his country at the 2009 World Championships and 2010 World Indoor Championships reaching the semifinals on both occasions. In addition, he won a bronze medal at the 2009 Central American and Caribbean Championships.

His personal bests are 13.46 seconds in the 110 metres hurdles (+1.1 m/s, Tomblaine 2009) and 7.64 seconds in the 60 metres hurdles (Düsseldorf 2010).

== International competitions ==
Year	Competition	Venue	Position	Event	Notes
Representing Cuba
2009	ALBA Games	Havana, Cuba	1st	110 m hurdles	13.61
2009	Central American and Caribbean Championships	Havana, Cuba	3rd	110 m hurdles	13.39 (w)
2009	World Championships	Berlin, Germany	19th (sf)	110 m hurdles	13.55
2010	World Indoor Championships	Doha, Qatar	12th (sf)	60 m hurdles	7.76
2010	Ibero-American Championships	San Fernando, Spain	4th	110 m hurdles	13.86
