= Dayron Varona =

Cuban baseball player (born 1988)

- Outfielder
- Born: February 24, 1988 (age 37); Havana, Cuba
- Bats: Right Throws: Right
- Stats at Baseball Reference

Dayron Armando Varona Suarez (born February 24, 1988) is a Cuban former professional baseball outfielder.

== Career ==
=== Tampa Bay Rays ===
Varona played for Camagüey in the Cuban National Series (CNS) through 2013, while also playing for the Naranjas de Villa Clara in 2012. He was suspended from CNS play in November 2013 for an attempted defection. He successfully defected from Cuba the next week and signed a minor league contract with the Rays in March 2015. The Rays assigned him to the Charlotte Stone Crabs of the High-A Florida State League in May, and was promoted to the Montgomery Biscuits of the Double-A Southern League. In 84 total appearances for the two affiliates, Varona batted .286/.324/.477 with 11 home runs, 60 RBI, and six stolen bases.

During President Barack Obama's March 2016 visit to Cuba, Varona played for the Rays against the Cuban national team at the Estadio Latinoamericano in Havana. The Rays won the game, and Varona became the first Cuban defector to return to play in Cuba. Varona played for the Durham Bulls of the Triple-A International League in 2016, slashing .232/.274/.407 with 14 home runs, 59 RBI, and 10 stolen bases across 118 appearances. He returned to Durham for the 2017 season, hitting .268/.325/.479 with two home runs, nine RBI, and three stolen bases in 19 games.

Varona was released by the Rays organization on June 3, 2017.

=== York Revolution ===
On June 21, 2017, Varona signed with the York Revolution of the Atlantic League of Professional Baseball. In 56 appearances for the Revolution, he batted .277/.318/.416 with four home runs, 36 RBI, and three stolen bases. Varona became a free agent following the season.
