= David Oliver (hurdler) =

American hurdler (born 1982)

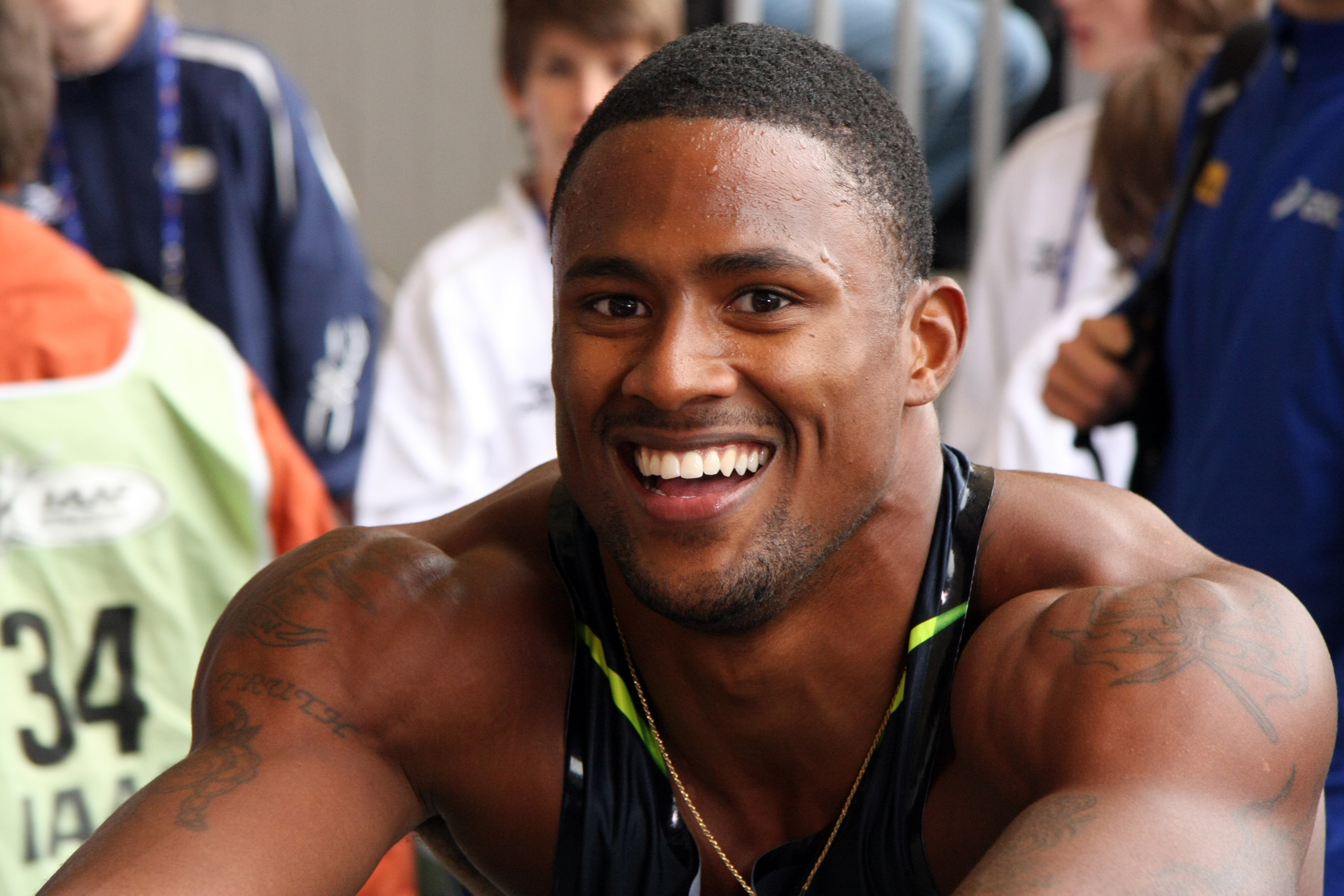
- Oliver in 2008 in Berlin

Personal information
- Nationality: American
- Born: April 24, 1982 (age 44) Denver, Colorado, U.S.
- Home town: Kissimmee, Florida, U.S.
- Height: 6 ft 2 in (188 cm)
- Weight: 205 lb (93 kg)

Sport
- Sport: Track and field
- Event: 110 m hurdles
- College team: Howard Bison

Achievements and titles
- Personal best: 110 m hurdles: 12.89 (0.5 m/s)
Medal record
Men's athletics
Representing the United States
Olympic Games
Bronze medal – third place	2008 Beijing	110 m hurdles
World Championships
Gold medal – first place	2013 Moscow	110 m hurdles
World Indoor Championships
Bronze medal – third place	2010 Doha	60 m hurdles
Continental Cup
Gold medal – first place	2010 Split	110 m hurdles
Pan American Games
Gold medal – first place	2015 Toronto	110 m hurdles

David Oliver (born April 24, 1982), is the Director of Track & Field at Howard University and a retired American hurdling athlete. As a professional athlete, he competed in the 110 meter hurdles event outdoor and the 60 meter hurdles event indoors. He is the former 110 meter hurdles champion winning the gold medal at the World Championships in Moscow in 2013 with a time of 13 seconds. He won the bronze medal in the 2008 Olympic Games and won another bronze at the 2010 IAAF World Indoor Championships.

He was the American record holder in the 110 meter hurdles. Oliver is a four-time U.S. Champion, having won indoor and outdoor titles in 2008, a second outdoor title at the 2010 USA Outdoor Track and Field Championships and third outdoor title at the 2011 USA Outdoor Track and Field Championships. He also won the gold medal at the 2008 IAAF World Athletics Final. He has a personal best of 12.89 seconds in the 110 m hurdles, placing him fifth on the all-time list at the time of his retirement from athletics at the end of the 2017 season (fourth at the time he ran it).

== Career ==
=== College ===
Having been recruited from Denver (CO) East High School by Howard University's head coach, Michael Merritt, Oliver enjoyed his first successes on the track in the Mid-Eastern Athletic Conference (MEAC). He won four consecutive outdoor MEAC 110 metres hurdles titles, from 2001 to 2004. He was also a MEAC indoor champion in the 55 metres hurdles, winning in 2003 in 7.34 seconds.

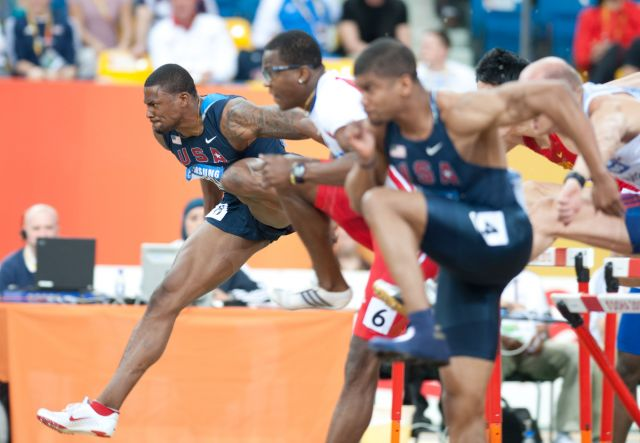
Oliver leading the 60 m hurdles at the 2010 IAAF World Indoor Championships.

Oliver received his first All-American honor with a fourth-place finish at the 2003 NCAA Men's Outdoor Track and Field Championship, running a personal record 13.60 seconds in the process, adding to a long history of Howard University's Track and Field NCAA Division I-A All-Americans. This was Howard's most recent track and field All-American since Calvin Branch received the honor in 1989.

The following year, he received a second All American honor, having taken fifth place at the NCAA Men's Indoor Track and Field Championship with a university record of 7.69 seconds in the 60 metres hurdles. Later that season, he recorded an outdoor Howard University record of 13.55 seconds for the 110 m hurdles at the Georgia Tech Invitational in Atlanta. During his time at college, he also played wide receiver for the Howard Bison football team. Mostly playing on special teams, Oliver's physical abilities drew the attention of NFL teams. He was invited for try-outs with the Miami Dolphins and Minnesota Vikings.

=== Professional ===
After leaving college, he pursued track and field professionally. While coached by Brooks Johnson, and managed by Marisa Reich he won at the Internationales Stadionfest IAAF Golden League meet in Berlin in 2006 and finished fifth at that year's World Athletics Final. It was his first big international victory. At the 2008 Penn Relays, Oliver completed the fastest 4×120 yd shuttle hurdle relays of all-time with teammates Aubrey Herring, Joel Brown, Aries Merritt, finishing the rarely contested event in a record time of 53.31 seconds. In 2007, he was second at the USA Indoor Track and Field Championships after winning at the Tyson Invitational. Outdoors, he improved his personal best to 13.14 seconds, finishing runner-up at the Qatar Athletic Super Grand Prix, and was third at the USA Outdoor Track and Field Championships. This meant he qualified for the 2007 World Championships in Athletics and he almost reached the final, being knocked out of the semi-finals after finishing fourth in his race.

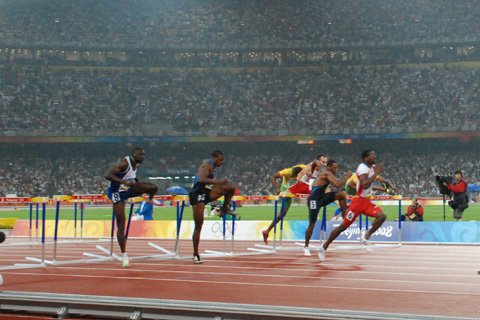
Oliver (center) in the 2008 Olympic sprint hurdles final.

In 2008 Oliver won his first national title in the 60 m hurdles. At the 2008 IAAF World Indoor Championships, he was knocked out in the semi-finals stage. Later in the year, he ran a personal best of 12.95 seconds at the Qatar Grand Prix. He ran a wind-assisted 12.89 seconds in the semi-finals of the United States Olympic Trials and went on to beat Olympic and world silver medalist Terrence Trammell in the final with another windy run of 12.95 seconds. Oliver went on to claim the bronze medal in the 110 m hurdles at the 2008 Beijing Olympics, finishing behind Dayron Robles who set an Olympic record and compatriot David Payne. He closed the year with victories at the ISTAF meet in Berlin and at the 2008 IAAF World Athletics Final. He was the second fastest 110 m hurdler of 2008. The 2009 season started promisingly for Oliver, as he recorded 13.09 seconds for his third win in Qatar, but a calf strain resulted in him missing the US Outdoor Championships, and thus the opportunity to qualify for the 2009 World Championships in Athletics.

Oliver started the 2010 outdoor season with four straight wins over other competitors, among them victories at the Ponce Grand Prix, and the Colorful Daegu Pre-Championships Meeting over Dayron Robles. He scored his first IAAF Diamond League win at the Shanghai Golden Grand Prix in May, beating home favorite Liu Xiang with a meeting record of 12.99 seconds. The following month he set a new personal best of 12.93 seconds to win his second national title at the USA Championships. Oliver improved on his personal best in the 110 m hurdles on July 3, 2010, with a time of 12.90 seconds, equalling the area and national record held by Dominique Arnold. On July 16, 2010, Oliver ran 12.89 for the 110 m hurdles, which was the third fastest time ever at that point (after Dayron Robles and Liu Xiang). Additionally, he moved up to number six on the all-time lists in the 60 m hurdles with a win at the Sparkassen Cup, where his personal best of 7.37 seconds also brought him his first ever indoor victory over Dayron Robles. By the time 2010 came to an end, Oliver was unbeaten in 15 finals races and held the top five times and eight of the top nine times in the world. .

2011 saw Oliver, during the outdoor season, win another U.S. Championship title and run under the 13 second barrier again. Indoor he produced his career best 7.37, just 0.01 off the American record. He finished the season ranked #3 in the world.

2013, Oliver was able to bounce back from back to back injury plagued seasons and he was able to win his first global title, winning the World Championships in 13.00 in Moscow, Russia. He also won his second IAAF Diamond League title.

=== Retirement from Athletics ===
At the end of the 2017 season, Oliver announced his retirement from athletics. He was subsequently appointed head of the track and field program at his alma mater, Howard University.

== Personal life ==
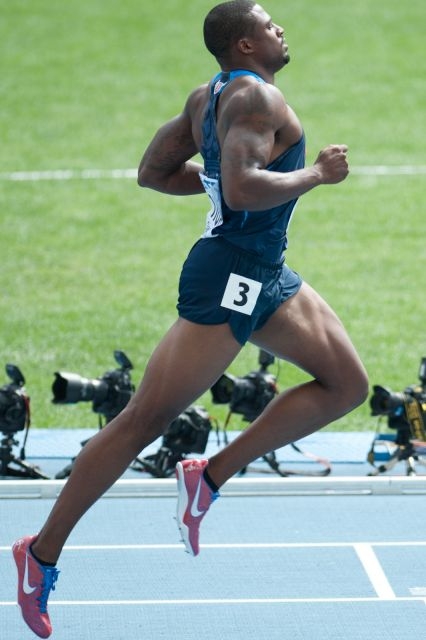
Oliver at the 2011 World Championships in Athletics

His mother, Brenda Chambers, also competed in track and field in the 400 m hurdles event.

He graduated from Denver East High School in Colorado, in 2000. He lives in Kissimmee, Florida and was trained by Aubrey Herring, and was formerly coached by Brooks Johnson. He graduated from Howard University in 2004 with a Bachelor of Business Administration in Marketing.

Oliver is also a supporter of English football team Arsenal Football Club.

== Personal bests ==
Event	Time (sec)	Wind	Date	Venue
110 m hurdles	12.89	0.5 m/s	July 16, 2010	Paris
60 m hurdles (indoor)	7.37	N/A	February 5, 2011	Stuttgart

== Competition record ==
Year	Competition	Venue	Position	Notes
2006	IAAF World Athletics Final	Stuttgart, Germany	5th	110 m hurdles
2007	World Championships	Osaka, Japan	4th (semis)	110 m hurdles
2008	World Indoor Championships	Valencia, Spain	4th (semis)	60 m hurdles
2008	Olympic Games	Beijing, China	3rd	110 m hurdles
2008	IAAF World Athletics Final	Stuttgart, Germany	1st	110 m hurdles
2010	World Indoor Championships	Doha, Qatar	3rd	60 m hurdles
2010	2010 Diamond League	Multiple Locations	1st	110 m hurdles
2010	DécaNation	Annecy, France	1st	110 m hurdles
2012	DécaNation	Albi, France	1st	110 m hurdles
2013	2013 Diamond League	Multiple Locations	1st	110 m hurdles
2013	World Championships	Moscow, Russia	1st	110 m hurdles
2015	2015 Diamond League	Multiple Locations	1st	110 m hurdles
2015	World Championships	Beijing, China	7th	110 m hurdles

- National outdoor championships – Winner: 2008, 2010, 2011, 2015. Runner-up: 2013
- National indoor championships – Winner: 2008. Runner-up: 2010.

== Rankings ==
Oliver was ranked among the best in the US and the world in the 110 m hurdles from 2005 to 2016, according to the votes of the experts of Track and Field News.

110 m hurdles
Year	World rank	US rank
2005	-	8th
2006	7th	5th
2007	9th	6th
2008	2nd	1st
2009	8th	5th
2010	1st	1st
2011	3rd	2nd
2012	3rd	3rd
2013	1st	1st
2014	6th	1st
2015	2nd	1st
2016	8th	2nd

== Achievements and Accolades ==
In 2014, Oliver was elected to the Howard University Hall of Fame.
