= Richard Phillips (hurdler) =

Jamaican hurdler

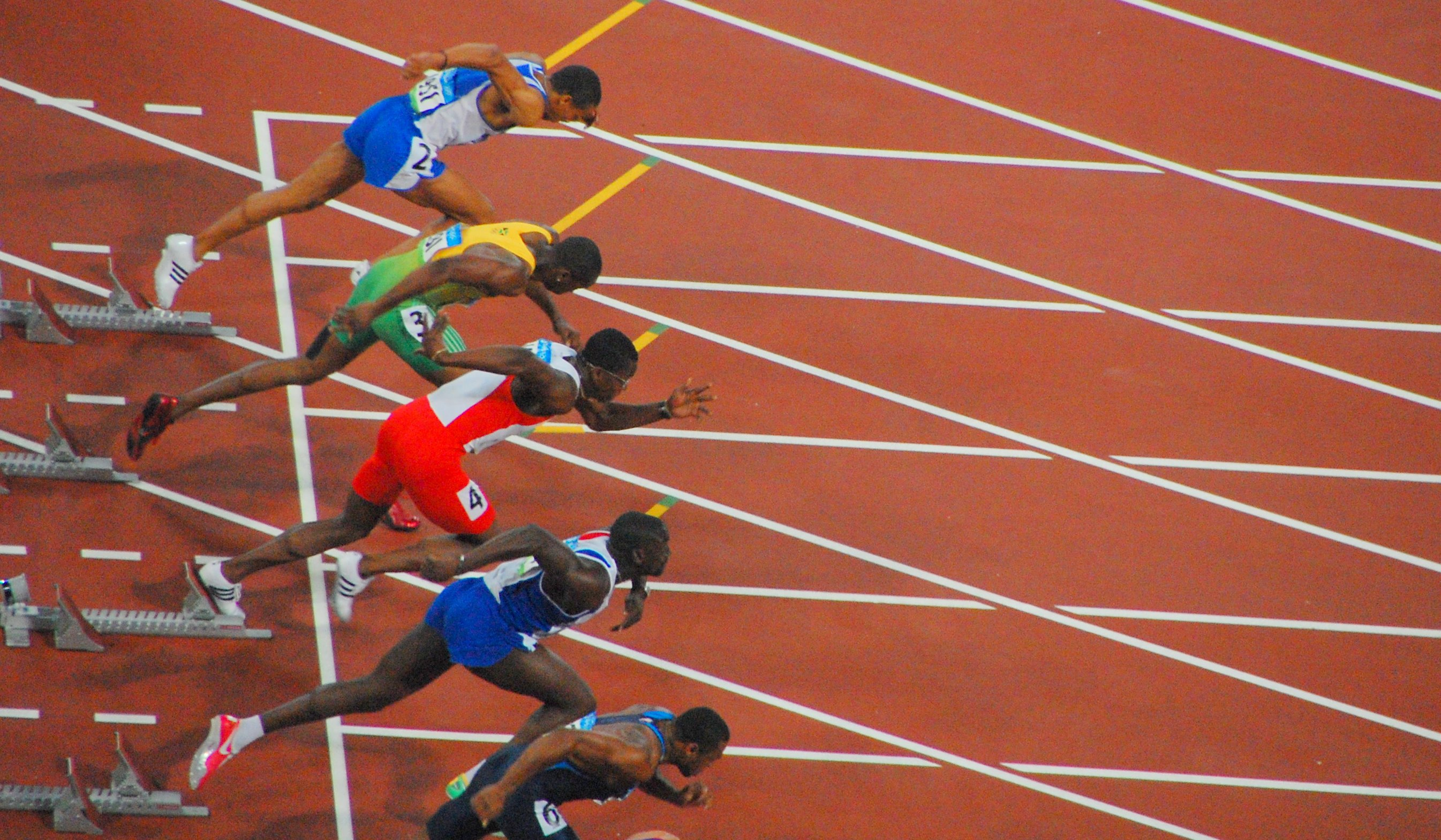

Personal information
- Nationality: Jamaica
- Born: 26 January 1983 (age 43)
- Height: 6 ft 4 in (1.93 m)
- Weight: 185 lb (84 kg)

Sport
- Sport: Track and field
- Event: 110 metres hurdles

Achievements and titles
- Personal best: 110 m hurdles 13.39 (+1.2 m/s) (Athens 2004)

Richard Phillips (born 26 January 1983) is a hurdler from Jamaica. Phillips competed in the 110 metres hurdles at the 2004, 2008 and the 2012 Summer Olympics. He also competed at the 2009 and 2011 World Championships in Athletics. He was born in Kingston.

Richard Phillips, a graduate of George Mason University and has represented Jamaica in athletics since 2000. His breakthrough came at the World Junior Championships in Athletics, which served as a springboard for his career. At that event, he narrowly missed out on a medal, finishing fourth in front of a packed crowd at the National Stadium in Kingston, Jamaica.

Phillips' consistent performance has been evident in his qualification for multiple Olympic Games. In 2008, at the 2008 Summer Olympics in Beijing, he reached the finals of the 110-meter hurdles, finishing seventh with a time of 13.60 seconds—just 0.42 seconds shy of the bronze medal. Notably, he competed alongside fellow George Mason alumnus Maurice Wignall (class of 2000).

At the 2004 Athens Olympics, Phillips advanced to the semi-finals of the 110-meter hurdles. Despite his strong performance, clocking 13.39 seconds, he missed the final by just 0.15 seconds.
