= Dayron Robles =

Cuban hurdler (born 1986)

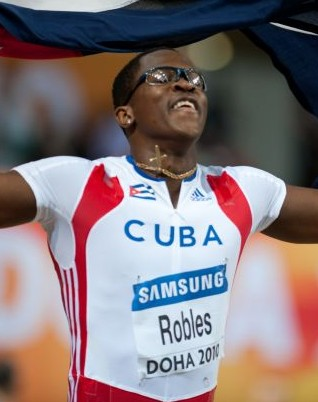

Personal information
- Nationality: Cuba
- Born: 19 November 1986 (age 40) Guantánamo, Cuba
- Height: 1.91 m (6 ft 3 in)
- Weight: 89 kg (196 lb)

Sport
- Sport: Running
- Event: 110 metres hurdles

Achievements and titles
- Personal best: 110 m hurdles: 12.87 s (Ostrava 2008)
Medal record
Men's athletics
Representing Cuba
Olympic Games
Gold medal – first place	2008 Beijing	110 m hurdles
World Indoor Championships
Gold medal – first place	2010 Doha	60 m hurdles
Silver medal – second place	2006 Moscow	60 m hurdles
Pan American Games
Gold medal – first place	2007 Rio de Janeiro	110 m hurdles
Gold medal – first place	2011 Guadalajara	110 m hurdles
World Junior Championships
Silver medal – second place	2004 Grosseto	110 m hurdles
Pan American Junior Championships
Gold medal – first place	2005 Windsor	110 m hurdles

Dayron Robles (born 19 November 1986) is a Cuban track and field athlete who specialises in the 110 metre hurdles.

He won his first major medal (a silver) in the 60 metres hurdles at the 2006 World Indoor Championships. He finished the 2006 season having improved his outdoor best to 13 seconds and become the Central American and Caribbean Games champion. Pan American gold came the following year in which also set a meet record of 12.92 seconds at the 2007 IAAF World Athletics Final – making him the joint fourth fastest ever.

He reached the pinnacle of his event in 2008 by setting a world record of 12.87 seconds in June at the Golden Spike Ostrava meet, and winning an Olympic gold medal at the 2008 Beijing Olympics in 12.93 seconds. Injury ruled him out for much of 2009, but he returned strongly with a championship record win at the 2010 IAAF World Indoor Championships. He was disqualified at the 2011 World Championships in Athletics – Men's 110 metres hurdles, for violation of rule 163.2, obstruction.

== Career ==
He won his first international medal at the 2004 World Junior Championships in Athletics, taking the silver medal in the 110 m hurdles which was Cuba's only medal of the competition. At the 2006 World Indoor Championships in Moscow he finished second with a new personal best time (indoor) of 7.46 seconds. He improved upon this time with a run of 7.33 s at the 2008 PSD Bank Meeting – this was a Panamerican record and made him the second-fastest ever indoors, behind Colin Jackson.

At the 2008 World Indoor Championships in Valencia he didn't advance from the heats due to fact that he stopped running, thinking that fellow hurdler Liu Xiang had made a false start. This was great disappointment for Robles, who had posted nine of the 11 fastest times of the winter season and was a favorite for winning the gold medal.

At the Beijing Olympics in 2008, many anticipated a Robles and Liu showdown in the final, but Liu was forced to pull out injured in the opening heat due to tendinitis. Robles went on to comfortably win the gold medal, posting a time of 12.93 s in the final.

During the 2009 IAAF World Championships, Dayron Robles was forced out of the competition, not finishing his semi-final because of muscular injury. After recovering from his injury, he entered the 2010 IAAF World Indoor Championships. The 60 metres final was the first time in over two years that Robles had faced Liu and Terrence Trammell in the same race. Robles began the race slowly but his power and technique saw him overhaul Trammell in the second half of the race to finish in 7.34 seconds, the third quickest time ever over the distance. The win marked a return to form and he said his first indoor gold ahead of the American was as important to him as his Olympic victory two years earlier.

After a season's best run of 13.12 seconds in the rain to win at the Ostrava Golden Spike meeting, he secured his first 2010 IAAF Diamond League victory at the Golden Gala with a time of 13.14 seconds, followed by a win at the Memorial Primo Nebiolo later that month. His best run of the season (13.01) at the Athletissima meet made him the second fastest man that year behind David Oliver, but an injury curtailed yet another season. He returned to action in May 2011 and won at the Grand Prix Région Guadeloupe meet.

Robles finished first in the 110 m hurdles at the 2011 World Athletics Championships, with a time of 13.14 seconds. However, the result was invalidated, as replays showed Robles reaching out to impede the progress of competitor Liu Xiang, using his hand to knock Xiang's hand.

== Achievements ==
=== Personal bests ===
Event	Time (seconds)	Venue	Date
50 meters hurdles	6.39	Stockholm, Sweden	21 February 2008
60 metres hurdles	7.33	Düsseldorf, Germany	8 February 2008
110 metres hurdles	12.87	Ostrava, Czech Republic	12 June 2008

- All information from IAAF Profile

=== Competition record ===
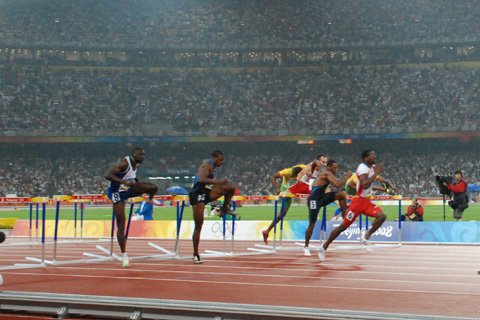
Robles leading the 110 meters hurdles final at the Beijing Olympics

Year	Competition	Venue	Position	Event	Notes
Representing Cuba
2003	World Youth Championships	Sherbrooke, Canada	6th	110 m hurdles (91.4 cm)	13.91
2004	World Junior Championships	Grosseto, Italy	2nd	110 m hurdles	13.77 (wind: -0.6 m/s)
2005	Central American and Caribbean Championships	Nassau, Bahamas	2nd	110 m hurdles	13.41 w (wind: +2.6 m/s)
2006	World Indoor Championships	Moscow, Russia	2nd	60 m hurdles	7.46 s PB
2006	Central American and Caribbean Games	Cartagena, Colombia	1st	110 m hurdles	13.12 s CR
2007	Panamerican Games	Rio de Janeiro, Brazil	1st	110 m hurdles	13.25 s
2007	World Championships in Athletics	Osaka, Japan	4th	110 m hurdles	13.15 s
2007	IAAF World Athletics Final	Stuttgart, Germany	1st	110 m hurdles	12.92 s CR
2008	Golden Spike Meet	Ostrava, Czech Republic	1st	110 m hurdles	12.87 s WR
2008	Olympic Games	Beijing, PR China	1st	110 m hurdles	12.93 s
2009	Central American and Caribbean Championships	Havana, Cuba	1st	110 m hurdles	13.18 w (wind: +2.5 m/s)
2010	World Indoor Championships	Doha, Qatar	1st	60 m hurdles	7.34
2011	2011 World Championships in Athletics	Daegu, South Korea	—	110 m hurdles	DQ
2011	Pan American Games	Guadalajara, Mexico	1st	110 m hurdles	13.10
2012	Olympic Games	London, United Kingdom	—	110 m hurdles	DNF

=== Track records ===
As of 7 September 2024, Robles holds the following track records for 110 metres hurdles.

Location	Time	Windspeed m/s	Date	Notes
Alcalá de Henares	13.28	+0.2	24/06/2006	
Beijing	12.93	+0.1	21/08/2008	
Cáceres	13.34	–0.7	28/06/2006	
Cartagena	13.12	+0.7	26/07/2006	
Dubnica nad Váhom	12.95	–1.7	07/09/2008	
Guadalajara	13.10	+1.6	28/10/2011	
Linz	13.05	–1.2	11/09/2007	
Ostrava	12.87	+0.9	12/06/2008	This was the world record for 4 years 3 months and remains the Cuban record.
Reims	13.09	–0.4	30/06/2010	
Paris	12.88	+0.5	18/07/2008	
Sotteville-lès-Rouen	13.18	+1.8	08/07/2013	
Stockholm	12.91	+0.2	22/07/2008	
Tangier	13.28	NOT KNOWN	12/07/2009	
Turin	13.08	+1.2	12/06/2010	
Villeneuve d'Ascq	12.96	–0.6	27/06/2008	

Records
Preceded by (China) Liu Xiang	Men's 110 m Hurdles World Record Holder; June 12, 2008 – September 7, 2012	Succeeded by (United States) Aries Merritt
Sporting positions
Preceded by (China) Liu Xiang	Men's 110 m Hurdles Best Year Performance; 2007 (alongside Liu Xiang), 2008	Succeeded by Incumbent
Preceded by (Jamaica) Asafa Powell	IAAF Performance of the Year; 2008	Succeeded by Incumbent
