= Athletics at the 2006 Asian Games – Men's 110 metres hurdles =

Men's 110 metres hurdles at the 2006 Asian Games
- Venue: Khalifa International Stadium
- Dates: 11–12 December 2006
- Competitors: 15 from 11 nations

Medalists
gold medal	Liu Xiang	China
silver medal	Shi Dongpeng	China
bronze medal	Masato Naito	Japan

The men's 110 metres hurdles competition at the 2006 Asian Games in Doha, Qatar was held on 11 and 12 December 2006 at the Khalifa International Stadium.

== Schedule ==
All times are Arabia Standard Time (UTC+03:00)

Date	Time	Event
Monday, 11 December 2006	09:20	1st round
Tuesday, 12 December 2006	16:05	Final

== Records ==
Prior to this competition, the existing world, Asian and Games records were as follows.

World Record	Liu Xiang (CHN)	12.88	Lausanne, Switzerland	11 July 2006
Asian Record	Liu Xiang (CHN)	12.88	Lausanne, Switzerland	11 July 2006
Games Record	Liu Xiang (CHN)	13.27	Busan, South Korea	9 October 2002

== Results ==
Legend

- DNS — Did not start

=== 1st round ===
- Qualification: First 3 in each heat (Q) and the next 2 fastest (q) advance to the final.

==== Heat 1 ====
- Wind: −0.8 m/s

Rank	Athlete	Time	Notes
1	Liu Xiang (CHN)	13.74	Q
2	Park Tae-kyong (KOR)	13.87	Q
3	Mohamed Issa Al-Thawadi (QAT)	13.98	Q
4	Tasuku Tanonaka (JPN)	14.02	q
5	Mubarak Ata Mubarak (KSA)	14.24	
6	Mahfuzur Rahman Mithu (BAN)	14.27	
7	Fawaz Al-Shammari (KUW)	15.42	

==== Heat 2 ====
- Wind: −1.1 m/s

Rank	Athlete	Time	Notes
1	Masato Naito (JPN)	13.70	Q
2	Shi Dongpeng (CHN)	13.71	Q
3	Lee Jung-joon (KOR)	13.96	Q
4	Mohd Robani Hassan (MAS)	14.11	q
5	Bader Al-Buainain (KSA)	14.37	
6	Nazar Mukhametzhan (KAZ)	14.43	
7	Tang Hon Sing (HKG)	14.82	
—	Rouhollah Asgari (IRI)	DNS	

=== Final ===
- Wind: −0.2 m/s

Rank	Athlete	Time	Notes
1st place, gold medalist(s)	Liu Xiang (CHN)	13.15	GR
2nd place, silver medalist(s)	Shi Dongpeng (CHN)	13.28	
3rd place, bronze medalist(s)	Masato Naito (JPN)	13.60	
4	Park Tae-kyong (KOR)	13.67	
5	Tasuku Tanonaka (JPN)	13.88	
6	Mohamed Issa Al-Thawadi (QAT)	13.89	
7	Lee Jung-joon (KOR)	13.91	
8	Mohd Robani Hassan (MAS)	14.04	
