= 2004 Asian Indoor Athletics Championships – Results =

These are the results of the 2004 Asian Indoor Athletics Championships which took place on 6–8 February 2004 in Tehran, Iran.

== Men's results ==
=== 60 meters ===
Heats – 6 February

Rank	Heat	Name	Nationality	Time	Notes
1	1	Abdolghaffar Saghar	Iran	6.76	Q, PB
2	1	Afzal Baig	Pakistan	6.97	Q, PB
3	1	Mohamed Abu Abdallah	Bangladesh	7.04	NR
4	1	N.T. Hassan	Iraq	7.19	NR
1	2	Lok To Wai	Hong Kong	6.79	Q
2	2	Hasan Lachini	Iran	6.79	Q, SB
3	2	Poh Seng Song	Singapore	6.90	NR
4	2	Mohamed Al-Rashedi	Bahrain	6.99	
6	2	Massoud Azizi	Afghanistan	7.40	NR
1	3	Shen Yunbao	China	6.78	Q
2	3	Chiang Wai Hung	Hong Kong	6.80	Q, SB
3	3	Nazmizan Mohamad	Malaysia	6.86	q, PB
4	3	Liu Yuan-Kai	Chinese Taipei	6.90	q, PB
5	3	Amir Hossein Tavakolian	Iran	6.92	
6	3	Bharmappa Nagaraj	India	6.96	NR

Final – 6 February

Rank	Name	Nationality	Time	Notes
1st place, gold medalist(s)	Abdolghaffar Saghar	Iran	6.76	=PB
2nd place, silver medalist(s)	Lok To Wai	Hong Kong	6.78	SB
3rd place, bronze medalist(s)	Shen Yunbao	China	6.79	
4	Chiang Wai Hung	Hong Kong	6.81	
5	Hasan Lachini	Iran	6.85	=PB
6	Nazmizan Mohamad	Malaysia	6.91	
7	Liu Yuan-Kai	Chinese Taipei	6.92	
8	Afzal Baig	Pakistan	7.07	

=== 200 meters ===
Heats – 7 February

Rank	Heat	Name	Nationality	Time	Notes
1	1	Liu Haitao	China	21.77	Q
2	1	Tomoyuki Arai	Japan	21.88	q
3	1	Amir Hossein Tavakolian	Iran	22.00	q
1	2	Hasan Lachini	Iran	21.77	Q
3	2	Mohamed Masudul Karim	Bangladesh	23.01	NR
3	3	Afzal Baig	Pakistan	22.71	NR

Semifinals – 7 February

Rank	Heat	Name	Nationality	Time	Notes
1	1	Tomoyuki Arai	Japan	21.78	Q
2	1	Liu Haitao	China	21.81	Q
1	2	Adel Mohamed Al-Farhan	Bahrain	21.95	Q
2	2	Hasan Lachini	Iran	22.08	Q
3	2	Amir Hossein Tavakolian	Iran	22.14	

Final – 7 February

Rank	Name	Nationality	Time	Notes
1st place, gold medalist(s)	Tomoyuki Arai	Japan	21.56	PB
2nd place, silver medalist(s)	Liu Haitao	China	21.63	
3rd place, bronze medalist(s)	Adel Mohamed Al-Farhan	Bahrain	21.87	NR
4	Hasan Lachini	Iran	21.93	PB

=== 400 meters ===
Heats – 7 February

Rank	Heat	Name	Nationality	Time	Notes
1	1	Mohammad Akefian	Iran	49.36	Q
2	1	Zahirudin Al-Najem	Syria	49.76	Q
3	1	Yan Karubaba	Indonesia	49.86	q, NR
4	1	Nazar Begliyev	Turkmenistan	50.05	q, NR
5	1	Amish Philip Pottan	India	50.16	NR
1	2	Edward Mangasar	Iran	49.63	Q
2	2	Esmail Kaboutaran	Iran	49.84	Q
3	2	Mohd Faris Aftan	Iraq	50.11	NR
6	2	Mohamed Kabir Rafie	Afghanistan	56.34	NR

Final – 8 February

Rank	Name	Nationality	Time	Notes
1st place, gold medalist(s)	Mohammad Akefian	Iran	48.71	SB
2nd place, silver medalist(s)	Edward Mangasar	Iran	48.76	SB
3rd place, bronze medalist(s)	Esmail Kaboutaran	Iran	49.32	PB
4	Zahirudin Al-Najem	Syria	49.33	NR
5	Yan Karubaba	Indonesia	49.95	
6	Nazar Begliyev	Turkmenistan	50.37	

=== 800 meters ===
Heats – 6 February

Rank	Heat	Name	Nationality	Time	Notes
1	1	Rashid Ramzi	Bahrain	1:49.71	Q
2	1	Sajjad Moradi	Iran	1:49.80	Q
3	1	Masaharu Nakano	Japan	1:50.14	q, PB
4	1	Mikhail Kolganov	Kazakhstan	1:53.99	q
5	1	Nazar Begliyev	Turkmenistan	1:58.64	
1	2	Yusuf Saad Kamel	Bahrain	1:49.09	Q
2	2	Ehsan Mohajer Shojaei	Iran	1:50.28	Q
5	2	Mohd Faris Aftan	Iraq	2:03.13	NR

Final – 7 February

Rank	Name	Nationality	Time	Notes
1st place, gold medalist(s)	Rashid Ramzi	Bahrain	1:48.03	
2nd place, silver medalist(s)	Sajjad Moradi	Iran	1:48.48	NR
3rd place, bronze medalist(s)	Yusuf Saad Kamel	Bahrain	1:48.89	
4	Mikhail Kolganov	Kazakhstan	1:48.97	
5	Ehsan Mohajer Shojaei	Iran	1:49.76	SB
6	Masaharu Nakano	Japan	1:53.09	

=== 1500 meters ===
8 February

Rank	Name	Nationality	Time	Notes
1st place, gold medalist(s)	Rashid Ramzi	Bahrain	3:55.73	SB
2nd place, silver medalist(s)	Sajjad Moradi	Iran	3:56.00	
3rd place, bronze medalist(s)	Ehsan Mohajer Shojaei	Iran	3:56.06	SB
4	Mikhail Kolganov	Kazakhstan	3:58.40	
5	Adnan Taess	Iraq	3:59.46	NR
6	Chen Fu-Pin	Chinese Taipei	4:02.68	NR
7	Denis Bagrev	Kyrgyzstan	4:03.10	
11	Chamkaur Dhaliwal Singh	Singapore	4:10.75	NR

=== 3000 meters ===
8 February

Rank	Name	Nationality	Time	Notes
1st place, gold medalist(s)	Leonard Mucheru	Bahrain	8:11.90	
2nd place, silver medalist(s)	Wu Wen-Chien	Chinese Taipei	8:24.39	SB
3rd place, bronze medalist(s)	Omid Mehrabi	Iran	8:33.00	SB
4	Denis Bagrev	Kyrgyzstan	8:35.39	
5	Arun D'Souza	India	8:43.67	PB
6	Sajjad Rahmani	Iran	8:43.84	PB
7	Ajmal Amirov	Tajikistan	8:43.85	
8	Noushad Khan	Pakistan	8:46.94	NR
11	Adnan Taess	Iraq	9:03.36	NR

=== 60 meters hurdles ===
Heats – 8 February

Rank	Heat	Name	Nationality	Time	Notes
1	1	Rouhollah Askari	Iran	8.00	Q
2	1	Mohamed Al-Othman	Kuwait	8.07	Q, NR
3	1	Mohd Robani Hassan	Malaysia	8.08	Q
4	1	Mohammad Ahmad Hosseini	Iran	8.25	q
5	1	Oleg Normatov	Uzbekistan	8.29	SB
7	1	Mohamed Masudul Karim	Bangladesh	8.71	NR
1	2	Wu Youjia	China	7.96	Q
2	2	Muhammed Shah	Pakistan	8.14	Q
3	2	Tang Hon Sing	Hong Kong	8.21	Q, SB
4	2	Mostafa Poostchi	Iran	8.28	q
5	2	Andrey Korniyenko	Uzbekistan	8.29	PB

Final – 8 February

Rank	Name	Nationality	Time	Notes
1st place, gold medalist(s)	Wu Youjia	China	7.77	SB
2nd place, silver medalist(s)	Rouhollah Askari	Iran	7.82	NR
3rd place, bronze medalist(s)	Mohd Robani Hassan	Malaysia	8.03	NR
4	Mohamed Al-Othman	Kuwait	8.08	
5	Muhammed Shah	Pakistan	8.12	SB
6	Mostafa Poostchi	Iran	8.14	PB
7	Mohammad Ahmad Hosseini	Iran	8.17	
8	Tang Hon Sing	Hong Kong	?.??	

=== 4 × 400 meters relay ===
8 February

Rank	Nation	Athletes	Time	Notes
1st place, gold medalist(s)	Iran	Edvard Mangasar, Iraj Iri, Mohammad Akefian, Esmail Kaboutaran	3:16.99	NR
2nd place, silver medalist(s)	India	Amish Pothan, Sunil Joseph, Jasal Preet, Sreedharan Sreejith	3:19.91	NR
3rd place, bronze medalist(s)	Bahrain	Mohamed Al-Rashedi, Adel Mohamed Al-Farhan, Salem, Kam	3:22.21	NR

=== 5000 meters walk ===
8 February

Rank	Name	Nationality	Time	Notes
1st place, gold medalist(s)	Amir Khweirgoo	Iran	22:12.27	PB
2nd place, silver medalist(s)	Ebrahim Rahimian	Iran	22:19.56	PB
3rd place, bronze medalist(s)	Sitaram Basat	India	22:22.92	NR

=== High jump ===
7 February

Rank	Name	Nationality	Result	Notes
1st place, gold medalist(s)	Yuriy Pakhlyayev	Kazakhstan	2.23	SB
2nd place, silver medalist(s)	Zheng Ting	China	2.15	
3rd place, bronze medalist(s)	Shuhei Manabe	Japan	2.15	=PB
4	Ahmad Najwan Aqra	Malaysia	2.10	NR
5	Salem Al-Anezi	Kuwait	2.10	NR

=== Pole vault ===
8 February

Rank	Name	Nationality	Result	Notes
1st place, gold medalist(s)	Zhang Hongwei	China	5.40	SB
2nd place, silver medalist(s)	Eshagh Ghaffari	Iran	5.00	
3rd place, bronze medalist(s)	Mohsen Rabbani	Iran	5.00	
4	Ali Makki Al-Sabagha	Kuwait	4.80	SB

=== Long jump ===
6 February

Rank	Name	Nationality	Result	Notes
1st place, gold medalist(s)	Mohammed Al-Khuwalidi	Saudi Arabia	7.94	NR
2nd place, silver medalist(s)	Ahmed Fayez Al-Dosari	Saudi Arabia	7.76	
3rd place, bronze medalist(s)	Cai Peng	China	7.58	
4	Chou Chien-Cheng	Chinese Taipei	7.42	PB
5	Hussein Abdullah Al-Yoha	Kuwait	7.36	SB
6	Mohamed Imam Bakhash	Bahrain	7.35	NR
7	Roozbeh Asadibaksh	Iran	7.30	PB
8	Shahrul Amri Suhaimi	Malaysia	7.14	NR

=== Triple jump ===
8 February

Rank	Name	Nationality	Result	Notes
1st place, gold medalist(s)	Zhu Shujing	China	16.57	NJR
2nd place, silver medalist(s)	Mohammad Hazzory	Syria	16.42	NR
3rd place, bronze medalist(s)	Denis Sauranbayev	Kazakhstan	16.17	PB
4	Ali Reza Habibi	Iran	15.66	SB
5	Waseem Khan	Pakistan	15.50	NR
6	Mujahid Al-Yassen	Saudi Arabia	15.46	NJR
7	Hamil Reza Abolhasani	Iran	15.21	SB
8	Khaled Farhan Al-Bekheet	Kuwait	15.21	SB
11	Mohamed Imam Bakhash	Bahrain	14.28	NR

=== shot put ===
8 February

Rank	Name	Nationality	Result	Notes
1st place, gold medalist(s)	Amin Nikfar	Iran	18.33	
2nd place, silver medalist(s)	Ali Rahmani	Iran	18.30	
3rd place, bronze medalist(s)	Wang Zhiyong	China	17.93	
4	Kuldeep Singh Mann	India	17.58	PB
5	Amir Alvand	Iran	17.52	SB
6	Chang Ming-Huang	Chinese Taipei	17.49	NR
7	Yasutada Noguchi	Japan	17.38	

=== Heptathlon ===
6–7 February

The highest mark recorded in each event is highlighted in yellow

Rank	Athlete	Nationality	60m	LJ	SP	HJ	60m H	PV	1000m	Points	Notes
1st place, gold medalist(s)	Pavel Dubitskiy	Kazakhstan	7.03	7.04	13.14	2.02	8.37	4.70	2:59.70	5570	SB
2nd place, silver medalist(s)	Mohammad Ahmad Hosseini	Iran	7.09	6.92	12.20	2.02	8.09	3.80	2:48.71	5387	NR
3rd place, bronze medalist(s)	Rifat Artikov	Uzbekistan	7.33	6.37	14.33	2.05	8.56	4.80	3:10.21	5299	PB
4	B.S. Vinod	India	7.27	7.20	12.20	1.93	8.62	3.80	2:50.23	5167	NR
5	Mashari Al-Mubarak	Kuwait	7.09	6.46	12.67	1.90	8.30	4.00	3:11.10	4985	NR

== Women's results ==
=== 60 meters ===
Heats – 6 February

Rank	Heat	Name	Nationality	Time	Notes
1	1	Ruqaya Al-Ghasra	Bahrain	7.54	Q
2	1	Nafiseh Mataei	Iran	7.55	Q
3	1	Saori Kitakaze	Japan	7.58	Q
4	1	Shamsun Nahar Chumky	Bangladesh	8.13	PB
5	1	Alaa Hekmat	Iraq	8.42	NR
1	2	Zou Yingting	China	7.64	Q
2	2	Nagisa Setoguchi	Japan	7.68	Q
3	2	Maedeh Chavoushizadeh	Iran	7.71	Q
5	2	Robina Muqimyar	Afghanistan	9.92	NR

Final – 6 February

Rank	Name	Nationality	Time	Notes
1st place, gold medalist(s)	Zou Yingting	China	7.41	PB
2nd place, silver medalist(s)	Ruqaya Al-Ghasra	Bahrain	7.48	NR
3rd place, bronze medalist(s)	Saori Kitakaze	Japan	7.52	NJR
4	Nafiseh Mataei	Iran	7.53	NR
5	Maedeh Chavoushizadeh	Iran	7.62	PB
6	Nagisa Setoguchi	Japan	7.70	

=== 200 meters ===
Heats – 7 February

Rank	Heat	Name	Nationality	Time	Notes
1	1	Xie Rong	China	24.62	Q
2	1	Mayu Sato	Japan	25.66	Q
3	1	Maedeh Chavoushizadeh	Iran	25.74	q
1	2	Ruqaya Al-Ghasra	Bahrain	24.16	Q, NR
2	2	Asami Tanno	Japan	24.72	Q

Final – 7 February

Rank	Name	Nationality	Time	Notes
1st place, gold medalist(s)	Xie Rong	China	23.91	PB
2nd place, silver medalist(s)	Ruqaya Al-Ghasra	Bahrain	24.18	
3rd place, bronze medalist(s)	Asami Tanno	Japan	24.99	
4	Maedeh Chavoushizadeh	Iran	25.40	NR
5	Mayu Sato	Japan	25.81	

=== 400 meters ===
Heats – 7 February

Rank	Heat	Name	Nationality	Time	Notes
1	1	Tatyana Khadjimuratova	Kazakhstan	54.88	Q
2	1	Ruqaya Al-Ghasra	Bahrain	55.21	Q
3	1	Sun Hongfeng	China	55.34	q
4	1	Pinki Pramanik	India	55.51	q, NR
1	2	Marina Ivanova	Kazakhstan	56.04	Q, PB
2	2	Mayu Sato	Japan	56.33	Q
3	2	Zamira Amirova	Uzbekistan	58.16	SB
4	2	Zohreh Farjam	Iran	58.32	NR

Final – 8 February

Rank	Name	Nationality	Time	Notes
1st place, gold medalist(s)	Tatyana Khadjimuratova	Kazakhstan	54.46	SB
2nd place, silver medalist(s)	Ruqaya Al-Ghasra	Bahrain	55.29	
3rd place, bronze medalist(s)	Pinki Pramanik	India	55.64	
4	Marina Ivanova	Kazakhstan	56.14	
5	Mayu Sato	Japan	56.20	
6	Sun Hongfeng	China	58.89	

=== 800 meters ===
6 February

Rank	Name	Nationality	Time	Notes
1st place, gold medalist(s)	Miki Nishimura	Japan	2:10.04	SB
2nd place, silver medalist(s)	Liu Qing	China	2:14.43	
3rd place, bronze medalist(s)	Pinki Pramanik	India	2:15.06	SB
4	Leila Ebrahimi	Iran	2:15.93	NR
7	Wesam Abubkheet	Palestine	2:45.33	NR

=== 1500 meters ===
7 February

Rank	Name	Nationality	Time	Notes
1st place, gold medalist(s)	Xie Sainan	China	4:29.43	
2nd place, silver medalist(s)	Svetlana Lukasheva	Kazakhstan	4:36.94	SB
3rd place, bronze medalist(s)	Leila Ebrahimi	Iran	4:49.35	NR

=== 3000 meters ===
8 February

Rank	Name	Nationality	Time	Notes
1st place, gold medalist(s)	Svetlana Lukasheva	Kazakhstan	10:10.05	PB
2nd place, silver medalist(s)	Leila Ebrahimi	Iran	10:23.25	NR
3rd place, bronze medalist(s)	Elham Zanboori	Iran	11:08.20	PB

=== 60 meters hurdles ===
7 February

Rank	Name	Nationality	Time	Notes
1st place, gold medalist(s)	Xu Jia	China	8.34	
2nd place, silver medalist(s)	Tomoko Motegi	Japan	8.48	SB
3rd place, bronze medalist(s)	Padideh Bolourizadeh	Iran	9.19	NR

=== 4 × 400 meters relay ===
8 February

Rank	Nation	Athletes	Time	Notes
1st place, gold medalist(s)	Iran	Zohreh Farjam, Mina Pourseifi, Hadis Shahrami, Leila Ebrahimi	4:00.48	NR
2nd	Iran	Atefeh Shadman, Nobahar Rezvan, Somayyeh Mehraban, Maedeh Chavoshizadeh	4:03.41	

=== 3000 meters walk ===
6 February

Rank	Name	Nationality	Time	Notes
1st place, gold medalist(s)	Jasmin Kaur	India	14:54.15	PB
2nd place, silver medalist(s)	Ameneh Safavi	Iran	17:09.44	NR
3rd place, bronze medalist(s)	Homa Sheykhan	Iran	17:47.55	PB

=== High jump ===
6 February

Rank	Name	Nationality	Result	Notes
1st place, gold medalist(s)	Miyuki Fukumoto	Japan	1.83	SB
2nd place, silver medalist(s)	Bobby Aloysius	India	1.81	
3rd place, bronze medalist(s)	Sahana Kumari	India	1.79	SB
4	Zahra Nabizadeh	Iran	1.65	

=== Pole vault ===
7 February

Rank	Name	Nationality	Result	Notes
1st place, gold medalist(s)	Zhang Na	China	4.20	
2nd place, silver medalist(s)	Roslinda Samsu	Malaysia	4.00	NR
3rd place, bronze medalist(s)	Chang Ko-Hsin	Chinese Taipei	3.95	

=== Long jump ===
7 February

Rank	Name	Nationality	Result	Notes
1st place, gold medalist(s)	Xu Bei	China	6.30	
2nd place, silver medalist(s)	Jetty Joseph	India	5.98	
3rd place, bronze medalist(s)	Wang Kuo-Huei	Chinese Taipei	5.95	PB
4	Svetlana Klimina	Uzbekistan	5.94	SB

=== Triple jump ===
8 February

Rank	Name	Nationality	Result	Notes
1st place, gold medalist(s)	Xie Limei	China	13.39	
2nd place, silver medalist(s)	Svetlana Klimina	Uzbekistan	12.83	
3rd place, bronze medalist(s)	Wang Kuo-Huei	Chinese Taipei	12.61	NR

=== Shot put ===
6 February

Rank	Name	Nationality	Result	Notes
1st place, gold medalist(s)	Zhang Xiaoyu	China	17.38	SB
2nd place, silver medalist(s)	Iolanta Ulyeva	Kazakhstan	16.78	
3rd place, bronze medalist(s)	Olga Shukina	Uzbekistan	14.75	
4	Zeenat Parveen	Pakistan	13.48	NR
5	Parisa Behzadi	Iran	13.48	SB

=== Pentathlon ===
8 February

The highest mark recorded in each event is highlighted in yellow

Rank	Athlete	Nationality	60m H	HJ	SP	LJ	800m	Points	Notes
1st place, gold medalist(s)	Yuki Nakata	Japan	8.70	1.69	10.79	5.93	2:25.38	3977	
2nd place, silver medalist(s)	Padideh Bolorizadeh	Iran	9.35	1.54	11.39	5.57	2:30.76	3528	NR
3rd place, bronze medalist(s)	Svetlana Pestsova	Turkmenistan	10.06	1.57	10.81	5.57	3:31.75	3287	NR
4	Mina Poorseifi	Iran	10.40	1.42	8.69	4.80	2:42.03	2673	PB
5	Farmoosh Taberkhani	Iran	10.75	1.36	7.80	4.76	2:42.03	2479	PB
6	Rasha Abed Yaseen	Iraq	12.19	1.33	6.70	4.37	2:34.84	2141	NR
