= Athletics at the 2002 Asian Games – Men's 110 metres hurdles =

Men's 110 metres hurdles at the 2002 Asian Games
- Venue: Busan Asiad Main Stadium
- Dates: 8–9 October 2002
- Competitors: 11 from 8 nations

Medalists
gold medal	Liu Xiang	China
silver medal	Satoru Tanigawa	Japan
bronze medal	Park Tae-kyong	South Korea

The men's 110 metres hurdles competition at the 2002 Asian Games in Busan, South Korea was held on 8–9 October at the Busan Asiad Main Stadium.

== Schedule ==
All times are Korea Standard Time (UTC+09:00)

Date	Time	Event
Tuesday, 8 October 2002	14:00	1st round
Wednesday, 9 October 2002	15:10	Final

== Records ==
Prior to this competition, the existing world, Asian and Games records were as follows.

World Record	Colin Jackson (GBR)	12.91	Stuttgart, Germany	20 August 1993
Asian Record	Liu Xiang (CHN)	13.12	Lausanne, Switzerland	2 July 2002
Games Record	Li Tong (CHN)	13.30	Hiroshima, Japan	15 October 1994

== Results ==
Legend

- DNS — Did not start

=== 1st round ===
- Qualification: First 3 in each heat (Q) and the next 2 fastest (q) advance to the final.

==== Heat 1 ====
- Wind: −0.6 m/s

Rank	Athlete	Time	Notes
1	Liu Xiang (CHN)	14.08	Q
2	Park Tae-kyong (KOR)	14.20	Q
3	Mubarak Ata Mubarak (KSA)	14.28	Q
4	Mohd Faiz Mohamad (MAS)	14.56	q
5	Mohamed Hammadi (UAE)	15.28	
—	Abdul Rashid (PAK)	DNS	

==== Heat 2 ====
- Wind: −0.1 m/s

Rank	Athlete	Time	Notes
1	Shi Dongpeng (CHN)	13.93	Q
2	Mohamed Issa Al-Thawadi (QAT)	14.16	Q
3	Satoru Tanigawa (JPN)	14.16	Q
4	Lee Jung-ho (KOR)	14.50	q
5	Eisa Bilal Al-Suwaidi (UAE)	15.37	

=== Final ===
- Wind: +0.3 m/s

Rank	Athlete	Time	Notes
1st place, gold medalist(s)	Liu Xiang (CHN)	13.27	GR
2nd place, silver medalist(s)	Satoru Tanigawa (JPN)	13.83	
3rd place, bronze medalist(s)	Park Tae-kyong (KOR)	13.89	
4	Shi Dongpeng (CHN)	13.92	
5	Mubarak Ata Mubarak (KSA)	14.07	
6	Mohamed Issa Al-Thawadi (QAT)	14.26	
7	Mohd Faiz Mohamad (MAS)	14.57	
8	Lee Jung-Ho (KOR)	14.61	
