= 2005 Asian Athletics Championships – Men's 110 metres hurdles =

The men's 110 metres hurdles event at the 2005 Asian Athletics Championships was held in Incheon, South Korea on September 1 and 2.

== Medalists ==
Gold	Silver	Bronze
Liu Xiang; China	Shi Dongpeng; China	Rouhollah Askari; Iran

== Results ==
=== Heats ===
Wind: Heat 1: +0.1 m/s, Heat 2: +0.7 m/s

Rank	Heat	Name	Nationality	Time	Notes
1	1	Liu Xiang	China	13.65	Q
2	1	Rouhollah Askari	Iran	13.88	Q
2	2	Shi Dongpeng	China	13.88	Q
4	1	Masato Naito	Japan	13.99	Q
4	2	Park Tae-Kyong	South Korea	13.99	Q
6	2	Mubarak Ata Mubarak	Saudi Arabia	14.01	Q
7	2	Mohd Robani Hassan	Malaysia	14.10	q
8	1	Mohammed Aissa Al-Thawadi	Qatar	14.25	q
9	2	Narongdech Janjai	Thailand	14.29	
10	1	Suphan Wongsriphuck	Thailand	14.31	
11	1	Aruna Indika Kumara De Silva	Sri Lanka	14.32	
11	2	Tasuku Tanonaka	Japan	14.32	
13	2	Tang Hon Sing	Hong Kong	14.58	
14	2	Muhammed Shah	Pakistan	14.68	
15	1	Jang Sung-Han	South Korea	14.73	
16	1	Bader Abdou Al-Ainain	Saudi Arabia	14.82	

=== Final ===
Wind: 0.0 m/s

Rank	Name	Nationality	Time	Notes
1st place, gold medalist(s)	Liu Xiang	China	13.30	
2nd place, silver medalist(s)	Shi Dongpeng	China	13.44	
3rd place, bronze medalist(s)	Rouhollah Askari	Iran	13.89	
4	Masato Naito	Japan	13.90	
5	Park Tae-Kyong	South Korea	14.04	
6	Mubarak Ata Mubarak	Saudi Arabia	14.13	
7	Mohd Robani Hassan	Malaysia	14.17	
8	Mohammed Aissa Al-Thawadi	Qatar	14.46	
