= 2003 Asian Athletics Championships – Men's 110 metres hurdles =

The men's 110 metres hurdles event at the 2003 Asian Athletics Championships was held in Manila, Philippines on September 20–21.

== Medalists ==
Gold	Silver	Bronze
Shi Dongpeng; China	Park Tae-Kyong; South Korea	Wu Youjia; China

== Results ==
=== Heats ===
Wind: Heat 1: +1.2 m/s, Heat 2: +1.7 m/s, Heat 3: +0.3 m/s

Rank	Heat	Name	Nationality	Time	Notes
1	1	Wu Youjia	China	13.78	Q
2	2	Shi Dongpeng	China	13.82	Q
3	2	Tasuku Tanonaka	Japan	13.86	Q
4	3	Park Tae-Kyong	South Korea	13.94	Q
5	2	Mohammed Aissa Al-Thawadi	Qatar	13.98	q, SB
6	1	Suphan Wongsriphuck	Thailand	14.00	Q
7	1	Mohd Robani Hassan	Malaysia	14.07	q, =SB
8	2	Mubarak Al-Mabadi	Saudi Arabia	14.13	
9	1	Rouhollah Askari	Iran	14.15	=SB
10	1	Naunidh Singh	India	14.17	
11	3	Gurpreet Singh	India	14.22	Q, SB
12	2	Mohd Faiz Mohamad	Malaysia	14.25	
13	2	Tran Quoc Hoan	Vietnam	14.32	NR
14	3	Andrey Korniyenko	Uzbekistan	14.33	
	3	Aruna Indika Kumara De Silva	Sri Lanka	DNF	
	3	Mahfuzur Rahman	Bangladesh	DNS	
	3	Mubarak Ata Mubarak	Saudi Arabia	DNS	

=== Final ===
Wind: -0.7 m/s

Rank	Name	Nationality	Time	Notes
1st place, gold medalist(s)	Shi Dongpeng	China	13.50	
2nd place, silver medalist(s)	Park Tae-Kyong	South Korea	13.71	NR
3rd place, bronze medalist(s)	Wu Youjia	China	13.80	
4	Tasuku Tanonaka	Japan	13.94	
5	Mohammed Aissa Al-Thawadi	Qatar	14.05	
6	Suphan Wongsriphuck	Thailand	14.09	
7	Mohd Robani Hassan	Malaysia	14.09	
8	Gurpreet Singh	India	14.30	
