= Athletics at the 2013 SEA Games – Men's 110 metres hurdles =

The men's 110 metres hurdles at the 2013 SEA Games was part of the athletics program held in Naypyidaw, Myanmar. The track and field event took place at the Wunna Theikdi Stadiumon December 19.

== Schedule ==
All times are Myanmar Standard Time (UTC+06:30)

Date	Time	Event
Thursday, 19 December 2013	15:30	Final

== Records ==
Prior to this competition, the existing world, Asian, and Southeast Asian Games records were as follows.

World Record	Aries Merritt (USA)	12.80 (+0.3 m/s)	Brussels, Belgium	7 September 2012
Asian Record	Liu Xiang (CHN)	12.88 (+1.1 m/s)	Lausanne, Switzerland	11 July 2006
Games Record	Jamras Rittidet (THA)	13.77	Palembang, Indonesia	13 November 2011

== Results ==
Legend

- Wind:-0.3 m/s

Rank	Lane	Athlete	Time	Notes
1st place, gold medalist(s)	5	Jamras Rittidet (THA)	13.72	GR, NR
2nd place, silver medalist(s)	6	Rayzam Shah Wan Sofian (MAS)	14.00	
3rd place, bronze medalist(s)	7	Anousone Xaysa (LAO)	14.17	NR
4	3	Kittipong Kongdee (THA)	14.29	
5	2	Nguyen Ngoc Quang (VIE)	14.30	
6	4	Eric Shauwn Cray (PHI)	14.34	
7	3	Rohaizad Jamil (MAS)	14.43	
8	2	La Eain Phyo (MYA)	15.82	
9	4	Soe Moe Win (MYA)	16.30	
