= List of Turkmen records in athletics =

The following are the national records in athletics in Turkmenistan maintained by Amateur Athletic Federation of Turkmenistan (AAFT).

== Outdoor ==
Key to tables: Awaiting ratification Record not kept by AAFT Not ratified or later rescined by AAFT

=== Men ===
Event	Record	Athlete	Date	Meet	Place	Ref.
100 m	10.44 (±0.0 m/s)	Makhmud Yusupov	23 May 1992		Alma Ata, Kazakhstan	
200 m	21.21	Sergey Vladimirtsev	4 June 1978		Sofia, Bulgaria	
200 m	21.21	Sergey Vladimirtsev	2 August 1978		Havana, Cuba	
400 m	45.86	Vitaliy Fedotov	26 August 1981		Kiev, Soviet Union	
800 m	1:47.66	Sergey Kamayev	17 September 1986		Tashkent, Soviet Union	
1500 m	3:42.48	Rashid Kayumov	27 July 1982		Kiev, Soviet Union	
3000 m	8:07.44	Marly Sopyev	7 June 1996		Moscow, Russia	
5000 m	13:55.45	Marly Sopyev	6 July 1995		Saint Petersburg, Russia	
10,000 m	28:50.0	Rashid Kakadshanov	18 July 1978		Vilnius, Soviet Union	
Half marathon	1:03:46	Marly Sopyev	18 May 1996		Moscow, Russia	
Marathon	2:15:53	Rashid Kakadshanov	5 October 1980		Uzhgorod, Soviet Union	
110 m hurdles	13.85	Oleg Podmaryov	17 July 1987		Bryansk, Soviet Union	
400 m hurdles	51.89	Igor Podmaryov	18 September 1986		Tashkent, Soviet Union	
400 m hurdles	51.6 h	Oleg Podmaryov	30 September 1981		Kharkov, Soviet Union	
3000 m steeplechase	8:50.43	Igor Zaynalov	18 July 1988		Kiev, Soviet Union	
High jump	2.20 m	Nikolay Stolyarov	19 May 1996		Almaty, Kazakhstan	
Pole vault	4.61 m	Oleg Tsirtsenis	17 May 1981		Ashgabat, Soviet Union	
Long jump	7.99 m	Vladimir Malyavin	3 June 1994		Budapest, Hungary	
Triple jump	17.20 m	Vladimir Brigadniy	2 May 1983		Ashgabat, Soviet Union	
Shot put	17.19 m	Tejen Hommadov	22 May 2013		Ashgabat, Turkmenistan	
Discus throw	57.45 m	Maksat Mamedov	21 May 2015		Ashgabat, Turkmenistan	
Discus throw	62.06 m	Chary Mamedov	15 July 2000		Almaty, Kazakhstan	
Hammer throw	74.01 m	Mergen Mamedov	16 June 2013	International Kosanov Meeting	Almaty, Kazakhstan	
Javelin throw	66.95 m	Serdar Mamedov	29/30 April 2011		Ashgabat, Turkmenistan	
Decathlon	7452 pts h	Dmitriy Goryunov	17–18 June 1990		Bryansk, Soviet Union	
Decathlon	100m / Long jump / Shot put / High jump / 400m / 110m H / Discus / Pole vault / Javelin / 1500m; 10.7 / 7.20 m / 14.18 m / 1.90 m / 49.6 / 15.2 / 41.24 m / 4.20 m / 52.92 m / 4:45.9					
20 km walk (road)	1:29:15	Aivars Zvideris	10 October 1971		Riga, Soviet Union	
50 km walk (road)	4:24:07	Oleg Bogdanov	10 September 1958		Riga, Soviet Union	
4 × 100 m relay	40.69	Turkmen SSR; G. Redzhepov; M. Redzhepov; E. Redzhepov; K. Khrenov	18 June 1983		Moscow, Soviet Union	
4 × 400 m relay	3:09.9	Turkmen SSR; V. Bryzgin; Z. Urinov; Vitaliy Fedotov; P. Spiridonov	28 July 1979		Moscow, Soviet Union	

=== Women ===
Event	Record	Athlete	Date	Meet	Place	Ref.
100 m	11.56 (+1.7 m/s)	Valentina Nazarova	7 June 2008		Almaty, Kazakhstan	
100 m	11.3 h	Yelena Ryabova	4 May 2012		Ashgabat, Turkmenistan	
200 m	23.70 (+2.0 m/s)	Alyona Litvinova	7 June 2008		Almaty, Kazakhstan	
400 m	52.10	Alyona Petrova	23 June 2001		Almaty, Kazakhstan	
800 m	2:06.84	Svetlana Sots	7 September 1984		Donetsk, Soviet Union	
1500 m	4:23.44	Marina Tutinina	10 June 1991		Moscow, Soviet Union	
3000 m	9:36.36	Marina Tutinina	7 September 1991		Alma Ata, Soviet Union	
5000 m	16:59.1 h	Anna Markelova	25 April 1998		Ashgabat, Turkmenistan	
10,000 m	35:54.7 h	Anna Markelova	16 May 1999		Ashgabat, Turkmenistan	
Half marathon	1:21:59	Dildar Mamedova	5 May 2002	World Half Marathon Championships	Brussels, Belgium	
Marathon	2:57:36	Tamara Tongush	5 December 1985		Ashgabat, Soviet Union	
100 m hurdles	13.42	Natalya Belenkova	17 September 1986		Tashkent, Soviet Union	
400 m hurdles	58.47	Merjen Ishankuliyeva	14 June 2009		Almaty, Kazakhstan	
3000 m steeplechase						
High jump	1.96 m	Galina Brigadnaya	13 September 1985		Alma Ata, Soviet Union	
Pole vault						
Long jump	6.22 m	Galina Brigadnaya	19 May 1985		Ashgabat, Soviet Union	
Triple jump	13.97 m (+0.9 m/s)	Viktoriya Brigadnaya	1 October 1999		Singapore	
Triple jump	14.02 m (+1.2 m/s) (Note: questionable)	Viktoriya Brigadnaya	13 May 2001		Ashgabad, Turkmenistan	
Shot put	14.25 m	Muhabbat Rajapova	22/23 May 2008		Ashgabat, Turkmenistan	
Discus throw	44.54 m	Larisa Kusnetsova	17 July 1972		Ashgabat, Soviet Union	
Hammer throw	56.70 m	Ayna Mamedova	21 May 2011		Ashgabat, Turkmenistan	
Javelin throw	44.80 m	Irina Velikhanova	28 April 2015		Ashgabat, Turkmenistan	
Javelin throw	52.00 m	Jennet Mukhamova	27 May 2023	National Championships	Ashgabat, Turkmenistan	
Javelin throw	52.16 m	Jennet Mukhamova	12 July 2023	Asian Championships	Bangkok, Thailand	
Heptathlon	5476 pts	Natalya Frolova	11 June 1988		Tartu, Soviet Union	
Heptathlon	100m H / High jump / Shot put / 200m / Long jump / Javelin / 800m; 14.54 / 1.68 m / 12.63 m / 25.84 / 5.92 m / 41.40 m / 2:28.65					
20 km walk (road)						
50 km walk (road)						
4 × 100 m relay	46.74	Turkmenistan; Mahri Gokiyeva; Yelena Ryabova; Valentina Nazarova; Alyona Litvinova	7 June 2008		Almaty, Kazakhstan	
4 × 400 m relay	3:41.49	Turkmen SSR; N. Sergienko; Marina Oganesyan; L. Oganesyan; S. Zubkova	7 July 1989		Donetsk, Soviet Union	

=== Mixed ===
Event	Record	Athlete	Date	Meet	Place	Ref.
4 × 400 m relay	3:44.01	Turkmenistan; L. Gurbandurdyyev; O. Shageldiyeva; A. Sadulayev; E. Esedova	12 May 2024	Central Asian Championships	Tashkent, Uzbekistan	

== Indoor ==
=== Men ===
Event	Record	Athlete	Date	Meet	Place	Ref.
60 m	6.85	Alisher Sadulayev	17 January 2019	National Championships	Ashgabat, Turkmenistan	
60 m	6.5 h	Akmyrat Orazgeldyev	25 January 2013		Ashgabat, Turkmenistan	
60 m	6.5 h	Akmyrat Orazgeldyev	22 January 2014		Ashgabat, Turkmenistan	
60 m	6.5 h	Akmyrat Orazgeldyev	24 January 2015		Ashgabat, Turkmenistan	
60 m	6.5 h	Ildar Hojayev	28 January 2012		Ashgabat, Turkmenistan	
60 m	6.5 h	Guvanch Mattaganov	27 January 2017		Ashgabat, Turkmenistan	
60 m	6.5 h	Alisher Sadulayev	21 January 2024	Turkmen Championships	Ashgabat, Turkmenistan	
60 m	6.6 h	Islam Berdiyev	23 January 2010		Ashgabat, Turkmenistan	
60 m	6.6 h	Akmyrat Orazgeldyyev	5 February 2011	Turkmen Championships	Ashgabat, Turkmenistan	
60 m	6.7 h	Ildar Hojayev	5 February 2011	Turkmen Championships	Ashgabat, Turkmenistan	
60 m	6.8 h	Begench Durdymov	5 February 2011	Turkmen Championships	Ashgabat, Turkmenistan	
200 m						
400 m	50.05	Nazar Begliyev	7 February 2004	Asian Championships	Tehran, Iran	
400 m	49.7 h	Denis Skorobogatov	23 January 2010		Ashgabat, Turkmenistan	
800 m	1:54.07	Nazar Begliyev	14 March 2003	World Championships	Birmingham, United Kingdom	
1500 m	4:02.87	Perhat Annagylyjov	19 September 2017	Asian Indoor and Martial Arts Games	Ashgabat, Turkmenistan	
3000 m	8:43.81	Sakirjan Durdyyew	19 September 2017	Asian Indoor and Martial Arts Games	Ashgabat, Turkmenistan	
60 m hurdles	8.47	Baimurad Achirmouradov	5 March 1999	World Championships	Maebashi, Japan	
High jump	2.00 m	Sirgeldi Utomysow	20 September 2017	Asian Indoor and Martial Arts Games	Ashgabat, Turkmenistan	
Pole vault						
Long jump	7.91 m	Vladimir Malyavin	19 January 1996		Moscow, Russia	
Triple jump	15.90 m	Vladimir Rogov	14 January 1996		Ashgabat, Turkmenistan	
Shot put	16.13 m	Maksat Mämmedow	18 September 2017	Asian Indoor and Martial Arts Games	Ashgabat, Turkmenistan	
Heptathlon						
Heptathlon	60m / Long jump / Shot put / High jump / 60m H / Pole vault / 1000m					
5000 m walk						
4 × 400 m relay	3:19.01	Eziz Sähetnyyazow; Azat Wemmiyew; Begmyrat Makgayew; Denis Skorobogatow	20 September 2017	Asian Indoor and Martial Arts Games	Ashgabat, Turkmenistan	

=== Women ===
Event	Record	Athlete	Date	Meet	Place	Ref.
60 m	7.46	Valentina Meredova	19 September 2017	Asian Indoor and Martial Arts Games	Ashgabat, Turkmenistan	
60 m	7.46	Valentina Meredova	18 February 2024	Asian Championships	Tehran, Iran	
60 m	7.44	Valentina Meredova	18 February 2024	Asian Championships	Tehran, Iran	
60 m	7.1 h	Yelena Ryabova	25 January 2013		Ashgabat, Turkmenistan	
60 m	7.1 h	Valentina Meredova	21 January 2024	Turkmen Championships	Ashgabat, Turkmenistan	
60 m	7.4 h	Yelena Ryabova	5 February 2011	Turkmen Championships	Ashgabat, Turkmenistan	
200 m	24.68	Alyona Petrova	9 March 2001	World Championships	Lisbon, Portugal	
400 m	57.0	Alyona Petrova	December 1997		Rasht, Iran	
800 m	2:21.72	Irina Velihanova	18 September 2017	Asian Indoor and Martial Arts Games	Ashgabat, Turkmenistan	
1500 m	4:47.5 h	Merjen Ishanguliyeva	5 February 2011	Turkmen Championships	Ashgabat, Turkmenistan	
3000 m	10:24.96	Gözel Çopanowa	18 September 2017	Asian Indoor and Martial Arts Games	Ashgabat, Turkmenistan	
60 m hurdles	9.00	Irina Velihanova	18 September 2017	Asian Indoor and Martial Arts Games	Ashgabat, Turkmenistan	
High jump	1.66 m	Irina Velihanova	18 September 2017	Asian Indoor and Martial Arts Games	Ashgabat, Turkmenistan	
Pole vault						
Long jump	5.58 m	Walentina Meredowa	18 September 2017	Asian Indoor and Martial Arts Games	Ashgabat, Turkmenistan	
Triple jump	12.81 m	Viktoriya Brigadnaya	14 January 1996		Ashgabat, Turkmenistan	
Shot put	11.75 m	Svetlana Pestsova	18 September 2017	Asian Indoor and Martial Arts Games	Ashgabat, Turkmenistan	
Pentathlon	3787 pts	Irina Velihanova	18 September 2017	Asian Indoor and Martial Arts Games	Ashgabat, Turkmenistan	
Pentathlon	60m H / High jump / Shot put / Long jump / 800m; 9.00 / 1.66 m / 11.75 m / 5.24 m / 2:21.72					
3000 m walk						
4 × 400 m relay	3:50.39	Walentina Meredowa; Mariýa Ozymowa; Täjigözel Orazgeldiyewa; Ýelena Ryabowa	20 September 2017	Asian Indoor and Martial Arts Games	Ashgabat, Turkmenistan	
