= 2002 Asian Athletics Championships – Men's 110 metres hurdles =

The men's 110 metres hurdles event at the 2002 Asian Athletics Championships was held in Colombo, Sri Lanka on 10–11 August.

== Medalists ==
Gold	Silver	Bronze
Liu Xiang; China	Mubarak Ata Mubarak; Saudi Arabia	Mohd Faiz Mohamad; Malaysia

== Results ==
=== Heats ===
Wind:
Heat 1: +2.4 m/s, Heat 2: +1.9 m/s, Heat 3: +2.6 m/s

Rank	Heat	Name	Nationality	Time	Notes
1	1	Liu Xiang	China	13.88	Q
2	1	Mubarak Ata Mubarak	Saudi Arabia	14.10	Q
3	3	Mohamed Issa Al-Thawadi	Qatar	14.24	Q
4	1	Dmitriy Karpov	Kazakhstan	14.36	q
5	2	Mohd Robani Hassan	Malaysia	14.41	Q
6	1	Mohd Faiz Mohamad	Malaysia	14.42	q
7	3	Ken-ichi Sakurai	Japan	14.42	Q
8	2	Masato Naito	Japan	14.55	Q
9	3	Lin Chin-Fu	Chinese Taipei	14.60	
10	1	A.A.I.K. Silva	Sri Lanka	14.62	PB
11	3	Lee Jung-Ho	South Korea	14.80	
12	3	Cao Jing	China	14.91	
13	2	Mohamed Ahmad Mumtaz	Pakistan	14.97	
14	3	Nuwan Tharanga	Sri Lanka	14.98	SB
15	3	T.M. Nawagamuwa	Sri Lanka	15.17	PB
16	1	Mohamed Al-Othman	Kuwait	15.29	
17	2	Mohamed El-Zaharan	Lebanon	15.76	PB
	2	Khassif Mubarak	Qatar	DNS	

=== Final ===
Wind: +2.9 m/s

Rank	Name	Nationality	Time	Notes
1st place, gold medalist(s)	Liu Xiang	China	13.56	
2nd place, silver medalist(s)	Mubarak Ata Mubarak	Saudi Arabia	13.96	
3rd place, bronze medalist(s)	Mohd Faiz Mohamad	Malaysia	14.33	
4	Mohamed Issa Al-Thawadi	Qatar	14.37	
5	Dmitriy Karpov	Kazakhstan	14.47	
6	Ken-ichi Sakurai	Japan	14.50	
7	Masato Naito	Japan	14.54	
8	Mohd Robani Hassan	Malaysia	14.65	
