= Athletics at the 2005 Islamic Solidarity Games – Results =

Information of 2005 Marathon in Mecca, Saudi Arabia

These are the results of the athletics competition at the 2005 Islamic Solidarity Games which took place on April 12–15, 2005 in Mecca, Saudi Arabia.

== Results ==
=== 100 meters ===
Heats – April 12
Wind:
Heat 1: +0.3 m/s, Heat 2: 0.0 m/s, Heat 3: -0.3 m/s, Heat 4: -0.9 m/s

Rank	Heat	Name	Nationality	Time	Notes
1	1	Salem Al-Yami	Saudi Arabia	10.26	Q
2	1	Juma Al-Jabri	Oman	10.34	Q, NR
3	1	Mohd Latif Nyat	Malaysia	10.59	Q
4	1	Katim Touré	Senegal	10.65	PB
5	1	Ismael Daif	Morocco	10.74	SB
6	1	Abdul Latif Wahidi	Afghanistan	11.21	NR
1	2	Idrissa Sanou	Burkina Faso	10.25	Q
2	2	Jamal Al-Saffar	Saudi Arabia	10.39	Q
3	2	Ben Youssef Meité	Ivory Coast	10.40	Q, PB
4	2	Oumar Loum	Senegal	10.41	q, SB
5	2	Afzal Baig	Pakistan	10.42	q, NR
6	2	Andre Blackman	Guyana	10.46	
7	2	Shanmugam Narendran	Malaysia	10.70	SB
8	2	Masoud Azizi	Afghanistan	11.11	NR
1	3	Youssef Darweesh	Oman	10.65	Q, PB
2	3	Aleksandr Zolotukhin	Kyrgyzstan	10.73	Q, PB
3	3	Lamin Tucker	Sierra Leone	10.75	Q, SB
4	3	Vugar Mehdiyev	Azerbaijan	10.82	
5	3	Mounir Mahadi	Chad	10.90	PB
1	4	Adel Mohamed Al-Farhan	Bahrain	10.59	Q
2	4	Dadash Ibrahimov	Azerbaijan	10.59	Q, PB
3	4	Tidiane Coulibaly	Mali	10.96	Q

Semi-finals – April 12
Wind:
Heat 1: +0.5 m/s, Heat 2: +0.2 m/s

Rank	Heat	Name	Nationality	Time	Notes
1	1	Oumar Loum	Senegal	10.41	Q
2	1	Jamal Al-Saffar	Saudi Arabia	10.48	Q
3	1	Ben Youssef Meité	Ivory Coast	10.62	Q
4	1	Tidiane Coulibaly	Mali	10.83	Q, PB
5	1	Aleksandr Zolotukhin	Kyrgyzstan	10.83	
1	2	Idrissa Sanou	Burkina Faso	10.37	Q
2	2	Salem Al-Yami	Saudi Arabia	10.49	Q
3	2	Juma Al-Jabri	Oman	10.62	Q
4	2	Adel Mohamed Al-Farhan	Bahrain	10.66	Q
5	2	Mohd Latif Nyat	Malaysia	10.85	
6	2	Afzal Baig	Pakistan	10.85	
7	2	Lamin Tucker	Sierra Leone	10.94	

Final – April 13
Wind:
+0.8 m/s

Rank	Name	Nationality	Time	Notes
1st place, gold medalist(s)	Salem Al-Yami	Saudi Arabia	10.21	SB
2nd place, silver medalist(s)	Idrissa Sanou	Burkina Faso	10.27	
3rd place, bronze medalist(s)	Jamal Al-Saffar	Saudi Arabia	10.36	SB
4	Juma Al-Jabri	Oman	10.44	
5	Oumar Loum	Senegal	10.52	
6	Adel Mohamed Al-Farhan	Bahrain	10.55	SB
7	Ben Youssef Meité	Ivory Coast	10.63	
8	Tidiane Coulibaly	Mali	10.92	

=== 200 meters ===
Heats – April 14
Wind:
Heat 1: +1.4 m/s, Heat 2: -1.2 m/s, Heat 3: -1.2 m/s, Heat 4: +1.3 m/s, Heat 5: +0.4 m/s

Rank	Heat	Name	Nationality	Time	Notes
1	1	Hamed Al-Bishi	Saudi Arabia	21.56	Q
2	1	Juma Al-Jabri	Oman	22.01	Q
3	1	Aleksandr Zolotukhin	Kyrgyzstan	22.02	q
1	2	Hamood Al-Dalhami	Oman	22.03	Q
1	3	Joseph Batangdon	Cameroon	21.48	Q
1	4	Oumar Loum	Senegal	21.56	Q
2	4	Khalil Al-Hanahneh	Jordan	21.60	Q
3	4	Muhammad Imran	Pakistan	21.69	q
1	5	Bilal Al-Housaoui	Saudi Arabia	21.49	Q

Semi-finals – April 14
Wind:
Heat 1: +0.3 m/s, Heat 2: 0.0 m/s

Rank	Heat	Name	Nationality	Time	Notes
1	1	Hamed Al-Bishi	Saudi Arabia	20.79	Q
2	1	Joseph Batangdon	Cameroon	20.84	Q
3	1	Muhammad Imran	Pakistan	21.38	Q
4	1	Khalil Al-Hanahneh	Jordan	21.59	Q, SB
5	1	Hamoud Al-Saad	Kuwait	21.71	
1	2	Oumar Loum	Senegal	21.38	Q
2	2	Bilal Al-Housaoui	Saudi Arabia	21.56	Q
3	2	Afzal Baig	Pakistan	21.71	Q, SB
4	2	Hamood Al-Dalhami	Oman	21.76	Q
5	2	Aleksandr Zolotukhin	Kyrgyzstan	21.92	PB

Final – April 15
Wind:
0.0 m/s

Rank	Name	Nationality	Time	Notes
1st place, gold medalist(s)	Hamed Al-Bishi	Saudi Arabia	20.72	SB
2nd place, silver medalist(s)	Joseph Batangdon	Cameroon	20.73	
3rd place, bronze medalist(s)	Oumar Loum	Senegal	21.10	
4	Muhammad Imran	Pakistan	21.19	NJR
5	Hamood Al-Dalhami	Oman	21.60	PB
6	Bilal Al-Housaoui	Saudi Arabia	21.64	
7	Khalil Al-Hanahneh	Jordan	21.66	
8	Afzal Baig	Pakistan	21.82	

=== 400 meters ===
Heats – April 12

Rank	Heat	Name	Nationality	Time	Notes
1	1	Abdelkrim Khoudri	Morocco	46.38	Q, PB
2	1	Badaway Goma'amin	Egypt	46.38	Q, SB
3	1	Khalid Bashir Salem	Saudi Arabia	47.70	Q, SB
4	1	Abdel Salam Al-Hajjaj	Jordan	47.70	q
1	2	Abdellatif El Ghazaoui	Morocco	46.64	Q
2	2	Rana Saghir Ahmad	Pakistan	46.98	Q, SB
3	2	Ibragim Akhmedov	Azerbaijan	47.81	Q, PB
4	2	Yazid Abdulkarim Al-Fayez	Jordan	48.24	
5	2	Abdou Sylla	Senegal	48.80	PB
1	3	Nagmeldin Ali Abubakr	Sudan	47.40	Q
2	3	Seydina Doucouré	Senegal	47.64	Q, SB
3	3	Mahdi Faris Aftan	Iraq	47.75	Q, PB
4	3	Mohamed Salim Al-Rawahi	Oman	47.78	q, NJR
5	3	Faiçal Cherifi	Algeria	47.79	q, PB
1	4	Hamdan Al-Bishi	Saudi Arabia	47.09	Q
2	4	Adam Mohamed Al-Noor	Sudan	47.57	Q
3	4	Mohd Zuslaini Zafril	Malaysia	47.84	Q, SB
4	4	Valentin Bulychov	Azerbaijan	47.84	q
5	4	Ali Noori Al-Aboaidi	Iraq	48.28	PB

Semi-finals – April 13

Rank	Heat	Name	Nationality	Time	Notes
1	1	Nagmeldin Ali Abubakr	Sudan	47.10	Q
2	1	Abdelkrim Khoudri	Morocco	47.31	Q
3	1	Badaway Goma'amin	Egypt	47.50	Q
4	1	Seydina Doucouré	Senegal	47.75	Q
5	1	Mohd Zuslaini Zafril	Malaysia	47.91	
6	1	Khalid Bashir Salem	Saudi Arabia	48.10	
7	1	Mohamed Salim Al-Rawahi	Oman	48.68	
	1	Abdel Salam Al-Hajjaj	Jordan	??.??	
1	2	Hamdan Al-Bishi	Saudi Arabia	46.64	Q
2	2	Abdellatif El Ghazaoui	Morocco	47.08	Q
3	2	Adam Mohamed Al-Noor	Sudan	47.08	Q
4	2	Rana Saghir Ahmad	Pakistan	47.20	Q
5	2	Mahdi Faris Aftan	Iraq	47.91	
6	2	Ibragim Akhmedov	Azerbaijan	48.47	
7	2	Valentin Bulychov	Azerbaijan	48.49	
8	2	Faiçal Cherifi	Algeria	48.90	

Final – April 14

Rank	Name	Nationality	Time	Notes
1st place, gold medalist(s)	Nagmeldin Ali Abubakr	Sudan	44.93	AJR
2nd place, silver medalist(s)	Hamdan Al-Bishi	Saudi Arabia	45.57	SB
3rd place, bronze medalist(s)	Abdellatif El Ghazaoui	Morocco	46.57	SB
4	Adam Mohamed Al-Noor	Sudan	46.75	
5	Abdelkrim Khoudri	Morocco	46.86	
6	Badaway Goma'amin	Egypt	47.14	
7	Rana Saghir Ahmad	Pakistan	47.31	
8	Seydina Doucouré	Senegal	48.97	

=== 800 meters ===
Heats – April 12

Rank	Heat	Name	Nationality	Time	Notes
1	1	Ismail Ahmed Ismail	Sudan	1:51.85	Q
2	1	Mohammad Al-Azemi	Kuwait	1:51.92	Q
3	1	Muhammad Saeed Ahmad	Pakistan	1:52.28	q
4	1	Ahmed Al-Balaoui	Saudi Arabia	1:52.50	SB
5	1	Aboubaker El-Gatrouni	Libya	1:52.52	
1	2	Amine Laâlou	Morocco	1:52.94	Q
2	2	Nabil Madi	Algeria	??:??.??	Q
1	3	Mohammed Al-Salhi	Saudi Arabia	1:51.43	Q
2	3	Mouhssin Chehibi	Morocco	1:51.63	Q
3	3	Adnan Taess	Iraq	1:51.69	q

Final – April 13

Rank	Name	Nationality	Time	Notes
1st place, gold medalist(s)	Amine Laâlou	Morocco	1:45.96	
2nd place, silver medalist(s)	Mohammed Al-Salhi	Saudi Arabia	1:46.19	NR
3rd place, bronze medalist(s)	Ismail Ahmed Ismail	Sudan	1:47.20	
4	Mohammad Al-Azemi	Kuwait	1:47.95	
5	Adnan Taess	Iraq	1:49.14	PB
6	Mouhssin Chehibi	Morocco	1:50.56	
7	Muhammad Saeed Ahmad	Pakistan	1:51.72	PB
8	Nabil Madi	Algeria	DNF	

=== 1500 meters ===
Heats – April 14

Rank	Heat	Name	Nationality	Time	Notes
1	1	Abdalaati Iguider	Morocco	3:52.44	Q
2	1	Antar Zerguelaïne	Algeria	3:52.77	Q
1	2	Youssef Baba	Morocco	4:04.71	Q

Final – April 15

Rank	Name	Nationality	Time	Notes
1st place, gold medalist(s)	Tarek Boukensa	Algeria	3:47.01	
2nd place, silver medalist(s)	Youssef Baba	Morocco	3:47.61	
3rd place, bronze medalist(s)	Antar Zerguelaïne	Algeria	3:47.90	
4	Abdalla Abdelgadir	Sudan	3:48.49	SB
5	Abdalaati Iguider	Morocco	3:50.01	
6	Osman Mohamed Osman	Saudi Arabia	3:50.89	SB
7	Adnan Taess	Iraq	3:51.50	PB
8	Bashar Al-Kafraini	Jordan	3:51.63	PB
9	Mohammed Shaween	Saudi Arabia	3:52.82	
10	Qais Salim Al-Mahrooqi	Oman	3:53.04	NR

=== 5000 meters ===
April 15

Rank	Name	Nationality	Time	Notes
1st place, gold medalist(s)	Adil Kaouch	Morocco	14:11.25	SB
2nd place, silver medalist(s)	Khoudir Aggoune	Algeria	14:11.32	
3rd place, bronze medalist(s)	Samir Moussaoui	Algeria	14:12.84	
4	Mohamed Moustaoui	Morocco	14:13.93	
5	Abdelkerim Abdoulaye	Chad	14:16.60	NR
6	Baker Al-Mowaled	Saudi Arabia	14:24.39	
7	Ahmed El Radi	Sudan	14:25.29	SB

=== 10,000 meters ===
April 12

Rank	Name	Nationality	Time	Notes
1st place, gold medalist(s)	Khalid El Aamri	Morocco	28:40.33	
2nd place, silver medalist(s)	Mukhlid Al-Otaibi	Saudi Arabia	28:41.81	PB
3rd place, bronze medalist(s)	Boniface Kiprop	Uganda	28:46.27	
4	Hamza Mohamed Hamid	Sudan	28:46.27	NJR
5	Mohammed Amyn	Morocco	29:51.62	
6	Methgal Abu Drais	Jordan	30:09.33	

=== Marathon ===
April 15

Rank	Name	Nationality	Time	Notes
1st place, gold medalist(s)	Zaid Laroussi	Morocco	2:16:28	SB
2nd place, silver medalist(s)	Saïd Belhout	Algeria	2:21:16	SB
3rd place, bronze medalist(s)	Nasser Bilal Haj	Sudan	2:23:01	PB

=== 110 meters hurdles ===
Heats – April 15
Wind:
Heat 1: 0.0 m/s, Heat 2: -1.1 m/s, Heat 3: +0.3 m/s

Rank	Heat	Name	Nationality	Time	Notes
1	1	Todd Matthews-Jouda	Sudan	13.89	Q
2	1	Muhammed Shah	Pakistan	14.19	Q
3	1	Bader Abdou Al-Ainain	Saudi Arabia	14.34	SB
4	1	Nazar Mukhamedzan	Kazakhstan	14.48	PB
5	1	Mahfuzur Rahman	Bangladesh	14.87	NJR
1	2	Mubarak Ata Mubarak	Saudi Arabia	14.18	Q
2	2	Aymen Ben Ahmed	Tunisia	14.25	Q, SB
3	2	Séléké Samake	Senegal	14.26	q
4	2	Edi Jakariya	Indonesia	14.36	
5	2	Baymurat Ashirmuradov	Turkmenistan	14.72	SB
1	3	Mohd Robani Hassan	Malaysia	14.05	Q
2	3	Rouhollah Askari	Iran	14.08	Q
3	3	Abdul Rasheed	Pakistan	14.18	q
4	3	Hamdi Mhirsi	Tunisia	14.55	
5	3	Jalal Salem Al-Ghabshi	Oman	14.67	
6	3	Othmane Hadj Lazib	Algeria	14.75	PB

Final – April 15
Wind:
+1.2 m/s

Rank	Name	Nationality	Time	Notes
1st place, gold medalist(s)	Mubarak Ata Mubarak	Saudi Arabia	13.70	SB
2nd place, silver medalist(s)	Todd Matthews-Jouda	Sudan	13.79	
3rd place, bronze medalist(s)	Rouhollah Askari	Iran	13.92	
4	Mohd Robani Hassan	Malaysia	13.93	PB
5	Abdul Rasheed	Pakistan	14.15	PB
6	Muhammed Shah	Pakistan	14.17	PB
7	Séléké Samake	Senegal	14.22	NJR
8	Aymen Ben Ahmed	Tunisia	14.26	

=== 400 meters hurdles ===
Heats – April 12

Rank	Heat	Name	Nationality	Time	Notes
1	1	Hadi Soua'an Al-Somaily	Saudi Arabia	49.75	Q
2	1	Ibou Faye	Senegal	50.35	Q, SB
3	1	Hamid Ben Hammou	Morocco	51.07	
4	1	Ibragim Akhmedov	Azerbaijan	52.05	PB
5	1	Abdullah Said Al-Haidi	Oman	52.11	NR
1	2	Ibrahim Al-Hamaidi	Saudi Arabia	49.97	Q
2	2	El Hadj Seth Mbow	Senegal	50.50	Q, PB
3	2	Abdulgadir Idriss	Sudan	50.84	q, NR
4	2	Hussein Alaa Motar	Iraq	50.97	PB
5	2	Zulkarnain Purba	Indonesia	52.37	SB
1	3	Abderahmane Hamadi	Algeria	50.60	Q, PB
2	3	Kurt Couto	Mozambique	50.83	Q, NR
3	3	Bader El-Amine	Morocco	50.85	q
4	3	Aleksey Pogorelov	Kyrgyzstan	51.86	NR
5	3	Kamel Tabbal	Tunisia	52.37	
6	3	Oumarou Mohamadou	Togo	54.26	PB

Final – April 13

Rank	Name	Nationality	Time	Notes
1st place, gold medalist(s)	Ibrahim Al-Hamaidi	Saudi Arabia	49.55	SB
2nd place, silver medalist(s)	Hadi Soua'an Al-Somaily	Saudi Arabia	50.78	
3rd place, bronze medalist(s)	Abderahmane Hamadi	Algeria	50.91	
4	El Hadj Seth Mbow	Senegal	51.57	
5	Abdulgadir Idriss	Sudan	52.47	
6	Bader El-Amine	Morocco	52.47	
7	Kurt Couto	Mozambique	52.73	
	Ibou Faye	Senegal	DNF	

=== 3000 meters steeplechase ===
April 14

Rank	Name	Nationality	Time	Notes
1st place, gold medalist(s)	Merzak Ould Bouchiba	Algeria	8:50.84	
2nd place, silver medalist(s)	Moussa Youssef Idris	Sudan	8:54.15	
3rd place, bronze medalist(s)	Imed Zaidi	Tunisia	8:56.62	
4	Hamid Ezzine	Morocco	8:57.99	
5	Ali Al-Amri	Saudi Arabia	9:08.43	SB

=== 4 × 100 meters relay ===
April 15

Rank	Nation	Competitors	Time	Notes
1st place, gold medalist(s)	Saudi Arabia	Farag Al-Dosari, Jamal Al-Saffar, Yahya Al-Ghahes, Salem Al-Yami	39.80	
2nd place, silver medalist(s)	Oman	Juma Al-Jabri, Youssef Thani, Fahad Al-Jabri, Ahmed Nasser Al-Wahaibi	40.13	
3rd place, bronze medalist(s)	Ivory Coast	Ben Youssef Meité, Koffi Kouadio, Ubrich Tiékoura Kouassi, Tolra Kasaye	40.87	
4	Azerbaijan		41.36	
5	Afghanistan		44.10	

=== 4 × 400 meters relay ===
April 15

Rank	Nation	Competitors	Time	Notes
1st place, gold medalist(s)	Saudi Arabia	Ibrahim Al-Hamaidi, Hadi Soua'an Al-Somaily, Hamdan Al-Bishi, Mohammed Al-Salhi	3:04.35	
2nd place, silver medalist(s)	Sudan	Nagmeldin Ali Abubakr, Adam Mohamed Al-Noor, Ismail Ahmed Ismail, Abdulgadir Idriss	3:08.81	NR
3rd place, bronze medalist(s)	Morocco	Abdellatif El Ghazaoui, Abdelkrim Khoudri, Ismael Daif, Amine Laâlou	3:09.13	
4	Senegal	Séléké Samake, Abdou Sylla, Seydina Doucouré, Ibou Faye	3:12.11	
5	Iraq	Ali Noori Al-Aboaidi, Hussein Alaa Motar, Mahdi Faris Aftan, Adnan Taess	3:12.34	
6	Azerbaijan		3:17.63	
7	Algeria		3:19.26	

=== 20 kilometers walk ===
April 12

Rank	Name	Nationality	Time	Notes
1st place, gold medalist(s)	Hassanine Sebei	Tunisia	1:30:48	
2nd place, silver medalist(s)	Moussa Aouanouk	Algeria	1:32:41	
3rd place, bronze medalist(s)	Mohd Sharrulhaizy Abdul Rahman	Malaysia	1:35:57	SB

=== High jump ===
April 15

Rank	Name	Nationality	Result	Notes
1st place, gold medalist(s)	Omar Moussa Al-Masrahi	Saudi Arabia	2.20	NR
2nd place, silver medalist(s)	Ahmed Farouk El-Zaher	Egypt	2.17	NR
3rd place, bronze medalist(s)	Boubacar Séré	Burkina Faso	2.14	SB
4	Jamal Fakhri Al-Qasim	Saudi Arabia	2.14	PB
5	Salem Nasser Bakheet	Bahrain	2.14	SB
6	Sayed Abbas Al-Alaoui	United Arab Emirates	2.14	NR
7	Aleksandr Korolyev	Kazakhstan	2.11	
8	Kamel Rabaya	Algeria	2.05	SB

=== Pole vault ===
April 13

Rank	Name	Nationality	Result	Notes
1st place, gold medalist(s)	Mohamed Karbib	Morocco	5.20	SB
2nd place, silver medalist(s)	Ali Makki Al-Sabagha	Kuwait	5.10	NR
3rd place, bronze medalist(s)	Mohsen Rabbani	Iran	5.10	NR
4	Fahad Bader Al-Mershad	Kuwait	5.00	PB
5	Béchir Zaghouani	Tunisia	4.80	SB

=== Long jump ===
April 13

Rank	Name	Nationality	#1	#2	#3	#4	#5	#6	Result	Notes
1st place, gold medalist(s)	Mohammed Al-Khuwalidi	Saudi Arabia	x	8.10	x	x	8.44	x	8.44	AR
2nd place, silver medalist(s)	Issam Nima	Algeria							8.11	PB
3rd place, bronze medalist(s)	Ndiss Kaba Badji	Senegal							8.02	
4	Tarik Bouguetaïb	Morocco							7.92	SB
5	Ahmed Faiz	Saudi Arabia							7.86	
6	Hatem Mersal	Egypt							7.71	
7	Yahya Berrabah	Morocco							7.53	
8	Hussein Abdullah Al-Yoha	Kuwait							7.50	
9	Waseem Khan	Pakistan							7.49	
10	Shahrul Amri Suhaimi	Malaysia							7.47	
11	Zhandos Akhmetov	Kazakhstan							7.33	

=== Triple jump ===
April 14

Rank	Name	Nationality	Result	Notes
1st place, gold medalist(s)	Mohammad Hazzory	Syria	16.39	
2nd place, silver medalist(s)	Ndiss Kaba Badji	Senegal	16.34	
3rd place, bronze medalist(s)	Hamza Menina	Algeria	16.03	SB
4	Salem Al-Ahmedi	Saudi Arabia	15.92	
5	Vladimir Zayuts	Azerbaijan	15.73	PB
6	Waseem Khan	Pakistan	15.34	SB
7	Vladimir Rogov	Turkmenistan	15.33	PB
8	Ahmad Firdaus Salim	Malaysia	15.27	
9	Akotia Tchalla	Togo	15.17	SB
10	Mohammed Abdullah Abbas	United Arab Emirates	15.02	
11	Samir Muradov	Azerbaijan	14.90	

=== Shot put ===
April 12

Rank	Name	Nationality	Result	Notes
1st place, gold medalist(s)	Sultan Al-Hebshi	Saudi Arabia	18.97	PB
2nd place, silver medalist(s)	Amin Nikfar	Iran	18.73	SB
3rd place, bronze medalist(s)	Mehdi Shahrokhi	Iran	18.27	
4	Yasser Ibrahim Farag	Egypt	17.65	
5	Hicham Ait Aha	Morocco	17.61	SB
6	Wajdi Bellili	Tunisia	17.40	
7	Ahmad Hassan Gholoum	Kuwait	17.22	
8	Saeed Mubarak Al-Yami	Saudi Arabia	17.08	PB
9	Mohamed Meddeb	Tunisia	16.62	

=== Discus throw ===
April 13

Rank	Name	Nationality	Result	Notes
1st place, gold medalist(s)	Omar Ahmed El Ghazaly	Egypt	59.98	
2nd place, silver medalist(s)	Sultan Al-Dawoodi	Saudi Arabia	59.00	
3rd place, bronze medalist(s)	Ehsan Haddadi	Iran	58.66	
4	Abbas Samimi	Iran	58.22	
5	Yasser Ibrahim Farag	Egypt	56.14	PB
6	Abdullah Al-Shoumari	Saudi Arabia	54.82	SB
7	Saber Salem Baiha	United Arab Emirates	54.41	
8	Musaeb Al-Momani	Jordan	54.26	NJR

=== Hammer throw ===
April 14

Rank	Name	Nationality	Result	Notes
1st place, gold medalist(s)	Dilshod Nazarov	Tajikistan	76.98	
2nd place, silver medalist(s)	Ali Al-Zinkawi	Kuwait	75.96	SB
3rd place, bronze medalist(s)	Saber Souid	Tunisia	71.36	SB
4	Mohsen El Anany	Egypt	69.50	
5	Mohamed Abdulkarim	Kuwait	63.06	
6	Talal Al-Takrouni	Saudi Arabia	58.22	NR

=== Javelin throw ===
April 15

Rank	Name	Nationality	Result	Notes
1st place, gold medalist(s)	Ayoub Arakhi	Iran	70.66	
2nd place, silver medalist(s)	Firass Al-Mohamed	Syria	65.26	
3rd place, bronze medalist(s)	Wisam Al-Khizai	Iraq	64.56	PB
4	Khamis Al-Qatiti	Oman	62.62	

=== Decathlon ===
April 14–15

The highest mark recorded in each event is highlighted in yellow

Rank	Athlete	Nationality	100m	LJ	SP	HJ	400m	110m H	DT	PV	JT	1500m	Points	Notes
1st place, gold medalist(s)	Hakim Alaoui	Morocco	11.63	6.92	11.79	2.00	50.20	15.28	35.84	4.00	49.06	4:37.00	7010	
2nd place, silver medalist(s)	Mourad Souissi	Algeria	11.23	6.88	13.24	1.80	48.82	14.79	29.66	3.80	53.26	5:00.03	6866	PB
3rd place, bronze medalist(s)	Rédouane Youcef	Algeria	11.20	7.06	11.57	1.85	50.39	16.00	39.24	4.00	45.76	4:53.05	6817	SB
