= Mohd Robani Hassan =

Malaysian hurdler

Medal record

Men's athletics

Representing Malaysia

Asian Indoor Championships
Bronze medal – third place	2004 Tehran	60 m hurdles

Mohd Robani Hassan (born 18 January 1983) is a retired Malaysian athlete who specialised in the sprint hurdles events. He won several medals at the regional level, including gold at the 2005 SEA Games in Manila. He represented his country at the 2004 World Indoor Championships without reaching the semifinals.

He has personal bests of 13.85 seconds in the 110 metres hurdles (2008) and 8.03 seconds in the 60 metres hurdles (2004).

== Competition record ==
Year	Competition	Venue	Position	Event	Notes
Representing Malaysia
2001	Asian Junior Championships	Bandar Seri Begawan, Brunei	5th	110 m hurdles	15.05
2002	Asian Championships	Colombo, Sri Lanka	8th	110 m hurdles	14.65
2003	Asian Championships	Manila, Philippines	7th	110 m hurdles	14.09
2003	Southeast Asian Games	Hanoi, Vietnam	2nd	110 m hurdles	14.12
2004	Asian Indoor Championships	Tehran, Iran	3rd	60 m hurdles	8.03
2004	World Indoor Championships	Budapest, Hungary	26th (h)	60 m hurdles	8.04
2005	Islamic Solidarity Games	Mecca, Saudi Arabia	4th	110 m hurdles	13.93
2005	Asian Championships	Incheon, South Korea	7th	110 m hurdles	14.17
2005	Southeast Asian Games	Manila, Philippines	1st	110 m hurdles	14.08
2006	Asian Games	Doha, Qatar	8th	110 m hurdles	14.04
2009	Asian Championships	Guangzhou, China	5th	110 m hurdles	14.06
2009	Southeast Asian Games	Vientiane, Laos	2nd	110 m hurdles	14.05
2013	Islamic Solidarity Games	Palembang, Indonesia	6th	110 m hurdles	14.18
