= 2009 Asian Athletics Championships – Men's 110 metres hurdles =

The men's 110 metres hurdles event at the 2009 Asian Athletics Championships was held at the Guangdong Olympic Stadium on November 10–11.

== Medalists ==
| Gold | Silver | Bronze |
|---|---|---|
| Liu Xiang; China | Shi Dongpeng; China | Park Tae-kyong; South Korea |

== Results ==
=== Heats ===
Wind: Heat 1: +0.3 m/s, Heat 2: -0.2 m/s

| Rank | Heat | Name | Nationality | Time | Notes |
|---|---|---|---|---|---|
| 1 | 1 | Liu Xiang | China | 13.82 | Q |
| 2 | 2 | Shi Dongpeng | China | 13.87 | Q |
| 3 | 2 | Park Tae-kyong | South Korea | 13.87 | Q |
| 4 | 2 | Mohammed Al-Thawadi | Qatar | 13.91 | Q |
| 5 | 1 | Jamras Rittidet | Thailand | 13.97 | Q |
| 6 | 1 | Mohd Robani Hassan | Malaysia | 14.01 | Q, SB |
| 7 | 1 | Ahmed Khader Almuwallad | Saudi Arabia | 14.02 | q |
| 8 | 2 | Mubarak Ata Mubarak | Saudi Arabia | 14.16 | q |
| 9 | 2 | Majid Darwish | United Arab Emirates | 14.47 | PB |
| 10 | 2 | Fawaz Al-Shammari | Kuwait | 14.60 | |
| 11 | 2 | Supahan Wongsriphuck | Thailand | 14.76 | |
| 12 | 1 | Ahmad Hazer | Lebanon | 14.84 | F1 |
| 13 | 2 | Mo'Ath Alquesayren | Jordan | 14.99 | |
| 14 | 1 | Leung Ka Hei Gary | Hong Kong | 15.44 | |
| | 1 | Islam Mohamed Asadull | Bangladesh | DNS | |

=== Final ===
Wind: -0.1 m/s

| Rank | Lane | Name | Nationality | Time | Notes |
|---|---|---|---|---|---|
| 1st place, gold medalist(s) | 4 | Liu Xiang | China | 13.50 | |
| 2nd place, silver medalist(s) | 6 | Shi Dongpeng | China | 13.67 | F1 |
| 3rd place, bronze medalist(s) | 3 | Park Tae-kyong | South Korea | 13.82 | |
| 4 | 8 | Mohammed Al-Thawadi | Qatar | 13.94 | |
| 5 | 7 | Mohd Robani Hassan | Malaysia | 14.06 | |
| 6 | 5 | Jamras Rittidet | Thailand | 14.07 | |
| 7 | 1 | Mubarak Ata Mubarak | Saudi Arabia | 14.61 | |
| | 1 | Ahmed Khader Almuwallad | Saudi Arabia | DQ | F2 |
