= 2000 Asian Athletics Championships – Men's 110 metres hurdles =

The men's 110 metres hurdles event at the 2000 Asian Athletics Championships was held in Jakarta, Indonesia on 29–30 August.

== Medalists ==
Gold	Silver	Bronze
Mubarak Ata Mubarak; Saudi Arabia	Shen Zhensheng; China	Park Tae-Kyong; South Korea

== Results ==
=== Heats ===
Wind:
Heat 1: +0.4 m/s, Heat 2: +0.3 m/s

Rank	Heat	Name	Nationality	Time	Notes
1	2	Mubarak Ata Mubarak	Saudi Arabia	13.90	Q
2	1	Nassim Meziane	Qatar	14.18	Q
3	1	Shen Zhensheng	China	14.20	Q
4	2	Mohamed Aissa Al-Zawadi	Qatar	14.42	Q
5	2	Park Tae-Kyong	South Korea	14.44	Q
6	1	Mohd Rusli	Indonesia	14.54	Q
7	1	Zaid Al-Dosari	Saudi Arabia	14.61	q
8	2	Mohamed Ahmad Mumtaz	Pakistan	14.69	q
9	1	Tang Hon Sing	Hong Kong	14.78	
10	2	Hajime Hanazawa	Japan	15.23	
11	1	Nguyen Thanh Tung	Vietnam	15.31	

=== Final ===
Wind: +0.7 m/s

Rank	Name	Nationality	Time	Notes
1st place, gold medalist(s)	Mubarak Ata Mubarak	Saudi Arabia	14.02	
2nd place, silver medalist(s)	Shen Zhensheng	China	14.13	
3rd place, bronze medalist(s)	Park Tae-Kyong	South Korea	14.16	
4	Nassim Meziane	Qatar	14.35	
5	Zaid Al-Dosari	Saudi Arabia	14.47	
6	Mohd Rusli	Indonesia	14.52	
7	Mohamed Aissa Al-Zawadi	Qatar	14.61	
8	Mohamed Ahmad Mumtaz	Pakistan	14.79	
