= Rayzam Shah Wan Sofian =

Malaysian hurdler

Personal information
- Nationality: Malaysia
- Born: 11 January 1988 Keningau, Sabah, Malaysia
- Height: 1.80 m (5 ft 11 in)
- Weight: 79 kg (174 lb)
- Spouse: Eriyana Idris

Sport
- Sport: Athletics
- Event: Hurdles
Medal record
Men's athletics
Representing Malaysia
Southeast Asian Games
Gold medal – first place	2007 Korat	110 m hurdles
Gold medal – first place	2017 Kuala Lumpur	110 m hurdles
Silver medal – second place	2011 Palembang	110 m hurdles
Silver medal – second place	2013 Naypyidaw	110 m hurdles
Silver medal – second place	2015 Singapore	110 m hurdles
Silver medal – second place	2019 Philippines	110 m hurdles

Rayzam Shah Wan Sofian (born January 11, 1988) is a Malaysian track and field athlete specialising in the high hurdles. He twice competed at World Championships, in 2009 and 2013, without reaching the semifinals.

== Athletics career ==
His personal best is 13.67 seconds, set in Weinheim, Germany on 27 May 2017.

== Competition record ==
Year	Competition	Venue	Position	Event	Notes
Representing Malaysia
2006	Asian Junior Championships	Macau, China	2nd	110 m hurdles (99 cm)	13.84
2006	World Junior Championships	Beijing, China	12th (sf)	110 m hurdles (99 cm)	13.95
2007	Asian Championships	Amman, Jordan	18th (h)	100 m	10.74
2007	Asian Championships	Amman, Jordan	12th (h)	110 m hurdles	14.53
2007	Southeast Asian Games	Nakhon Ratchasima, Thailand	1st	110 m hurdles	13.91
2008	Asian Indoor Championships	Doha, Qatar	4th	60 m hurdles	8.01
2008	World Indoor Championships	Valencia, Spain	31st (h)	60 m hurdles	8.26
2009	World Championships	Berlin, Germany	41st (h)	110 m hurdles	14.06
2011	Asian Championships	Kobe, Japan	7th	110 m hurdles	14.03
2011	Southeast Asian Games	Palembang, Indonesia	2nd	110 m hurdles	13.86
2013	Asian Championships	Pune, India	11th (h)	110 m hurdles	14.28
2013	World Championships	Moscow, Russia	29th (h)	110 m hurdles	14.45
2013	Islamic Solidarity Games	Palembang, Indonesia	3rd	110 m hurdles	13.97
2013	Islamic Solidarity Games	Palembang, Indonesia	4th	4 × 100 m relay	40.43
2013	Southeast Asian Games	Naypyidaw, Myanmar	2nd	110 m hurdles	14.00
2015	Asian Championships	Wuhan, China	12th (h)	110 m hurdles	14.11
2015	Southeast Asian Games	Singapore	2nd	110 m hurdles	13.97
2016	Asian Indoor Championships	Doha, Qatar	9th (h)	60 m hurdles	8.04
2017	Asian Championships	Bhubaneswar, India	11th (h)	110 m hurdles	14.03
2017	Southeast Asian Games	Kuala Lumpur	1st	110 m hurdles	13.83
2018	Commonwealth Games	Gold Coast, Australia	12th (h)	110 m hurdles	14.03
2018	Asian Games	Jakarta, Indonesia	12th (h)	110 m hurdles	14.15
