= Rouhollah Asgari =

Iranian hurdler (born 1982)

Medal record

Representing Iran

Men's athletics

Asian Championships
Bronze medal – third place	2005 Incheon	110m Hurdles

Asian Indoor Championships
Silver medal – second place	2004 Tehran	60m Hurdles

West Asian Games
Silver medal – second place	2005 Doha	110m Hurdles

Rouhollah Asgari Gandmani (Persian: روح‌الله عسگری; born 8 January 1982 in Borujen) is an Iranian hurdler. He competed in the 110 m hurdles event at the 2012 Summer Olympics.

== Competition record ==
Year	Competition	Venue	Position	Event	Notes
Representing Iran
2003	Asian Championships	Manila, Philippines	9th (h)	110 m hurdles	14.15
2004	Asian Indoor Championships	Tehran, Iran	2nd	60 m hurdles	7.82
2005	Islamic Solidarity Games	Mecca, Saudi Arabia	3rd	110 m hurdles	13.92
2005	Universiade	İzmir, Turkey	7th	110 m hurdles	13.93
2005	Asian Championships	Incheon, South Korea	3rd	110 m hurdles	13.89
2005	West Asian Games	Doha, Qatar	2nd	110 m hurdles	14.42
2007	Asian Championships	Amman, Jordan	8th	110 m hurdles	14.20
2009	Asian Indoor Games	Hanoi, Vietnam	–	60 m hurdles	DNF
2010	West Asian Championships	Aleppo, Syria	1st	110 m hurdles	13.78
2010	Asian Games	Guangzhou, China	8th (h)	110 m hurdles	14.30
2012	Olympic Games	London, United Kingdom	40th (h)	110 m hurdles	13.97
