= Suphan Wongsriphuck =

Thai hurdler

Suphan Wongsriphuck (born 31 May 1977) is a retired Thai hurdler.

He finished sixth at the 2003 Asian Championships, won the gold medal at the 2003 Southeast Asian Games, the bronze medal at the 2005 Asian Indoor Games, finished fifth at the 2006 Asian Indoor Championships, seventh at the 2009 Asian Indoor Games and won another bronze medal at the 2009 Southeast Asian Games. He also competed at the 2005 World Championships and the 2005 Asian Championships without reaching the final.

His personal best time is 13.90 seconds, achieved in June 2008 in Nakhon Ratchasima.
