= Yuto Aoki =

Japanese hurdler

Personal information
- Nationality: Japanese
- Born: 11 July 1984 (age 42) Tokushima Prefecture, Japan
- Education: Waseda University
- Height: 1.75 m (5 ft 9 in)
- Weight: 73 kg (161 lb)

Sport
- Country: Japan
- Sport: Track and field
- Event: 110 metres hurdles

Achievements and titles
- Personal best: 110 m hurdles: 13.66 (Marugame 2010)

Yuto Aoki (青木 悠人, Aoki Yūto; born 11 July 1984 in Tokushima Prefecture) is a Japanese hurdler. He finished seventh in the 110 metres hurdles at the 2010 Asian Games.

== Personal best ==
Event	Time (s)	Competition	Venue	Date
110 m hurdles	13.66 (wind: +1.8 m/s)	Japanese Championships	Marugame, Japan	5 June 2010

== International competition ==
Year	Competition	Venue	Position	Event	Time (s)
Representing Japan
2010	Asian Games	Guangzhou, China	7th	110 m hurdles	14.03 (wind: +1.2 m/s)
