= Tasuku Tanonaka =

Japanese hurdler (born 1978)

Personal information
- Nationality: Japanese
- Born: 23 September 1978 (age 47) Chiba Prefecture, Japan
- Education: University of Tsukuba
- Height: 1.85 m (6 ft 1 in)
- Weight: 79 kg (174 lb)

Sport
- Country: Japan
- Sport: Track and field
- Event: 110 metres hurdles
- Personal best: 13.55 (2006)
Medal record
Men's athletics
Representing Japan
Asian Championships
Gold medal – first place	2007 Amman	110 m hurdles

Tasuku Tanonaka (田野中 輔, Tanonaka Tasuku; born 23 September 1978) is a Japanese athlete specialising in the 110 metres hurdles. He twice competed at World Championships, reaching the semifinals in 2007.

His personal best in the event is 13.55 from 2006.

== Competition record ==
Year	Competition	Venue	Position	Event	Notes
Representing Japan and Asia-Pacific (Continental Cup only)
2003	Asian Championships	Manila, Philippines	4th	110 m hurdles	13.94
2005	Asian Championships	Incheon, South Korea	11th (h)	110 m hurdles	14.32
2006	Asian Games	Doha, Qatar	5th	110 m hurdles	13.88
2007	Asian Championships	Amman, Jordan	1st	110 m hurdles	13.51 (w)
2007	World Championships	Osaka, Japan	18th (sf)	110 m hurdles	13.62
2009	World Championships	Berlin, Germany	38th (h)	110 m hurdles	13.84
2010	Continental Cup	Split, Croatia	7th	110 m hurdles	13.92
2010	Asian Games	Guangzhou, China	5th	110 m hurdles	13.81

== National titles ==
- Japanese Championships
  - 110 m hurdles: 2004, 2009, 2010
