= Jamras Rittidet =

Thai hurdler

Lac Jamras Rittidet (Thai: จํารัส ฤทธิเดช; born 1 February 1989) is a Thai athlete specialising in the 110 metres hurdles. He won the bronze medal at the 2014 Asian Games. He also represented his country at the 2013 and 2015 World Championships without qualifying for the semifinals.

He has personal bests of 13.61 seconds in the 110 metres hurdles (Incheon 2014) and 7.78 seconds in the 60 metres hurdles (Hanoi 2009). Both are current national records. He has won 4 consecutive gold medals at the Southeast Asian Games from 2009 to 2015 in the 110 metres hurdles.

== Competition record ==
Year	Competition	Venue	Position	Event	Notes
Representing Thailand
2006	Asian Junior Championships	Macau, China	8th	110 m hurdles (99 cm)	14.58
2007	Asian Indoor Games	Macau, China	9th (h)	60 m hurdles	8.17
2008	Asian Junior Championships	Jakarta, Indonesia	6th	110 m hurdles (99 cm)	14.09
2009	Asian Championships	Guangzhou, China	6th	110 m hurdles	14.07
2009	Asian Indoor Games	Hanoi, Vietnam	5th	60 m hurdles	7.88
2009	Southeast Asian Games	Vientiane, Laos	1st	110 m hurdles	13.89
2010	Asian Games	Guangzhou, China	6th	110 m hurdles	13.81
2011	Asian Championships	Kobe, Japan	4th	110 m hurdles	13.96
2011	Southeast Asian Games	Palembang, Indonesia	1st	110 m hurdles	13.77
2013	Asian Championships	Pune, India	5th	110 m hurdles	14.07
2013	World Championships	Moscow, Russia	31st (h)	110 m hurdles	14.71
2013	Southeast Asian Games	Naypyidaw, Myanmar	1st	110 m hurdles	13.72
2014	Asian Games	Incheon, South Korea	3rd	110 m hurdles	13.61
2015	Asian Championships	Wuhan, China	4th	110 m hurdles	13.77
2015	Southeast Asian Games	Singapore	1st	110 m hurdles	13.69
2015	World Championships	Beijing, China	35th (h)	110m hurdles	14.00
