= Athletics at the 2010 Asian Games – Men's 110 metres hurdles =

Men's 110 metres hurdles at the 2010 Asian Games
- Venue: Aoti Main Stadium
- Dates: 22–24 November 2010
- Competitors: 15 from 12 nations

Medalists
gold medal	Liu Xiang	China
silver medal	Shi Dongpeng	China
bronze medal	Park Tae-kyong	South Korea

The men's 110 metres hurdles event at the 2010 Asian Games was held at the Aoti Main Stadium, Guangzhou, China on 22–24 November.

== Schedule ==
All times are China Standard Time (UTC+08:00)

Date	Time	Event
Monday, 22 November 2010	18:20	Round 1
Wednesday, 24 November 2010	19:50	Final

== Records ==
Prior to this competition, the existing world, Asian and Games records were as follows.

World Record	Dayron Robles (CUB)	12.87	Ostrava, Czech Republic	12 June 2008
Asian Record	Liu Xiang (CHN)	12.88	Lausanne, Switzerland	11 July 2006
Games Record	Liu Xiang (CHN)	13.15	Doha, Qatar	12 December 2006

== Results ==
Legend

- DNF — Did not finish
- DNS — Did not start
- DSQ — Disqualified

=== Round 1 ===
- Qualification: First 3 in each heat (Q) and the next 2 fastest (q) advance to the final.

==== Heat 1 ====
- Wind: +1.2 m/s

Rank	Athlete	Time	Notes
1	Liu Xiang (CHN)	13.48	Q
2	Park Tae-kyong (KOR)	13.68	Q
3	Jamras Rittidet (THA)	13.82	Q
4	Tasuku Tanonaka (JPN)	13.90	q
5	Rouhollah Asgari (IRI)	14.30	q
6	Sami Al-Haydar (KSA)	14.33	
7	Iong Kim Fai (MAC)	14.78	
8	Dhirendra Chaudhary (NEP)	16.86	

==== Heat 2 ====
- Wind: +1.1 m/s

Rank	Athlete	Time	Notes
1	Ahmed Al-Muwallad (KSA)	13.69	Q
2	Shi Dongpeng (CHN)	13.89	Q
3	Yuto Aoki (JPN)	14.01	Q
4	Oudomsack Chanthavong (LAO)	15.66	
—	Siddhanth Thingalaya (IND)	DNF	
—	Fawaz Al-Shammari (IOC)	DSQ	
—	Majid Abbas Darwish (UAE)	DNS	

=== Final ===
- Wind: +1.1 m/s

Rank	Athlete	Time	Notes
1st place, gold medalist(s)	Liu Xiang (CHN)	13.09	GR
2nd place, silver medalist(s)	Shi Dongpeng (CHN)	13.38	
3rd place, bronze medalist(s)	Park Tae-kyong (KOR)	13.48	
4	Ahmed Al-Muwallad (KSA)	13.77	
5	Tasuku Tanonaka (JPN)	13.81	
6	Jamras Rittidet (THA)	13.81	
7	Yuto Aoki (JPN)	14.03	
—	Rouhollah Asgari (IRI)	DNF	
