= Kenji Yahata =

Japanese hurdler (born 1980)

Personal information
- Nationality: Japanese
- Born: 4 November 1980 (age 45) Ehime Prefecture, Japan
- Education: Juntendo University
- Height: 1.85 m (6 ft 1 in)
- Weight: 79 kg (174 lb)

Sport
- Country: Japan
- Sport: Track and field
- Event: 110 metres hurdles
- Retired: October 2014

Achievements and titles
- Personal best(s): 110 m hurdles: 13.58 (Kumagaya 2007); 60 m hurdles: 8.03 (Yokohama 2004)

Kenji Yahata (八幡 賢司, Yahata Kenji; born 4 November 1980 in Ehime Prefecture) is a retired Japanese hurdler who specialized in the 110 metres hurdles. He competed at the 2007 World Championships.

== Personal bests ==
Event	Time (s)	Competition	Venue	Date
110 m hurdles	13.58 (wind: +1.7 m/s)	East Japan Corporate Championships	Kumagaya, Japan	20 May 2007
60 m hurdles	8.03 (indoor)	Japan-China Indoor Match	Yokohama, Japan	21 February 2004

== International competition ==
Year	Competition	Venue	Position	Event	Time (s)
Representing Japan
2007	Asian Championships	Amman, Jordan	5th	110 m hurdles	13.86 (wind: +5.3 m/s)
2007	World Championships	Osaka, Japan	37th (h)	110 m hurdles	13.92 (wind: -0.6 m/s)
2011	Asian Championships	Kobe, Japan	5th	110 m hurdles	13.96 (wind: -0.8 m/s)

== National titles ==
- Japanese Championships
  - 110 m hurdles: 2012
