= Fawaz Al-Shammari =

Kuwaiti hurdler

Fawaz Al-Shammari (born 3 April 1977 in Kuwait City) is a Kuwaiti hurdler. He competed at the 2012 Summer Olympics.

== Competition record ==
Year	Competition	Venue	Position	Event	Notes
Representing Kuwait
2006	Asian Games	Doha, Qatar	14th (h)	110 m hurdles	15.42
2007	Asian Championships	Amman, Jordan	7th	110 m hurdles	14.12
2007	Asian Indoor Games	Macau, China	8th	60 m hurdles	8.19
2007	Pan Arab Games	Cairo, Egypt	3rd (h)	110 m hurdles	14.28
2008	Asian Indoor Championships	Doha, Qatar	8th	60 m hurdles	8.07
2009	Asian Indoor Games	Hanoi, Vietnam	6th	60 m hurdles	7.92
2009	Asian Championships	Guangzhou, China	10th (h)	110 m hurdles	14.60
2010	Asian Indoor Championships	Tehran, Iran	2nd	60 m hurdles	7.90
2010	West Asian Championships	Aleppo, Syria	2nd	110 m hurdles	13.81
2010	West Asian Championships	Aleppo, Syria	2nd	4 × 100 m relay	40.08
2010	Asian Games	Guangzhou, China	–	110 m hurdles	DQ
2011	Pan Arab Games	Doha, Qatar	–	110 m hurdles	DNF
2011	Asian Championships	Kobe, Japan	11th (h)	110 m hurdles	14.29
2011	Asian Championships	Kobe, Japan	13th (h)	400 m hurdles	58.76
2012	Asian Indoor Championships	Hangzhou, China	–	60 m hurdles	DQ
2012	Olympic Games	London, United Kingdom	41st (h)	110 m hurdles	14.00
