= Wu Youjia =

Chinese hurdler (born 1983)

Medal record

Men's athletics

Representing China

Asian Championships
| Bronze medal – third place | 2003 Manila | 110 m hurdles |
| Bronze medal – third place | 2007 Amman | 110 m hurdles |

Asian Indoor Championships
| Gold medal – first place | 2004 Tehran | 60 m hurdles |

Wu Youjia (born 6 May 1983) is a Chinese athlete specialising in the high hurdles. He competed at the 2005 World Championships without reaching the semifinals.

He has a personal best of 13.55 in the 110 metres hurdles (2005) and 7.68 in the indoor 60 metres hurdles (2007).

== Competition record ==
| Year | Competition | Venue | Position | Event | Notes |
Representing China
| 2002 | Asian Junior Championships | Bangkok, Thailand | 1st | 110 m hurdles | 14.18 |
| 2003 | Asian Championships | Manila, Philippines | 3rd | 110 m hurdles | 13.80 |
| 2004 | Asian Indoor Championships | Tehran, Iran | 1st | 60 m hurdles | 7.77 |
| 2005 | World Championships | Helsinki, Finland | 37th (h) | 110 m hurdles | 14.38 |
| 2007 | Asian Championships | Amman, Jordan | 3rd | 110 m hurdles | 13.68 (w) |
| 2007 | Asian Indoor Games | Macau, China | 1st | 60 m hurdles | 7.82 |
