= 2011 Asian Athletics Championships – Men's 110 metres hurdles =

The men's 110 metres hurdles at the 2011 Asian Athletics Championships was held at the Kobe Universiade Memorial Stadium on the 10 of July.

== Medalists ==
Gold	Liu Xiang; China
Silver	Shi Dongpeng; China
Bronze	Park Tae-Kyong; South Korea

== Records ==
2011 Asian Athletics Championships
World record	Dayron Robles (CUB)	12.87	Ostrava, Czech Republic	12 June 2008
Asian record	Liu Xiang (CHN)	12.88	Lausanne, Switzerland	11 July 2006
Championship record	Liu Xiang (CHN)	13.22	Kobe, Japan	10 July 2011

== Results ==
=== Round 1 ===
First 3 in each heat (Q) and 2 best performers (q) advanced to the Final.

Rank	Heat	Name	Nationality	Time	Notes
1	1	Liu Xiang	China	13.50	Q
2	2	Park Tae-Kyong	South Korea	13.71	Q
3	2	Shi Dongpeng	China	13.72	Q
4	2	Kenji Yahata	Japan	13.90	Q
5	2	Rayzam Shah Wan Sofian	Malaysia	13.94	q
6	2	Mojtaba Postchi Khorasani	Iran	14.00	q
7	1	Jamras Rittidet	Thailand	14.05	Q
8	1	Ali Hussein Al-Zaki	Saudi Arabia	14.15	Q
9	1	Wataru Yazawa	Japan	14.21	
10	1	Ahmad Hazer	Lebanon	14.25	
11	1	Fawaz Al-Shammari	Kuwait	14.29	
12	1	Mohsin Ali	Pakistan	14.52	
	2	Yaqoub al-Youha	Kuwait	DNF	
	2	Ahmed Al Muwallad	Saudi Arabia	DQ	168.7(c)
	1	Mubarak Sultana Al-Nobi	Qatar	DNS	
	2	Kim Fai Iong	Macau	DNS	

=== Final ===
Rank	Lane	Name	Nationality	Time	Notes
1st place, gold medalist(s)	4	Liu Xiang	China	13.22	CR
2nd place, silver medalist(s)	7	Shi Dongpeng	China	13.56	
3rd place, bronze medalist(s)	5	Park Tae-Kyong	South Korea	13.66	
4	6	Jamras Rittidet	Thailand	13.96	
5	8	Kenji Yahata	Japan	13.96	
6	2	Mojtaba Postchi Khorasani	Iran	13.97	
7	3	Rayzam Shah Wan Sofian	Malaysia	14.03	
	9	Ali Hussein Al-Zaki	Saudi Arabia	DQ	FS
