= Ahmed Al-Muwallad =

Saudi Arabian hurdler (born 1988)

Ahmed Khader Al-Muwallad
Personal information
- Born: 16 February 1988 (age 38)
- Height: 1.81 m (5 ft 11 in)
- Weight: 70 kg (154 lb)

Sport
- Sport: Athletics
- Events: 110 m hurdles, 60 m hurdles

Ahmed Khader A. Al-Muwallad (Arabic: أحمد المولد; born 16 February 1988) is a Saudi Arabian athlete specialising in the high hurdles. He won a gold medal at the 2017 Asian Indoor and Martial Arts Games and a bronze at the 2017 Asian Championships.

His personal bests are 13.36 seconds in the 110 metres hurdles (+0.9 m/s, Prague 2018) and 7.57 seconds in the 60 metres hurdles (Mondeville 2018). The latter is the current national record.

== International competitions ==
| Year | Competition | Venue | Position | Event | Notes |
Representing Saudi Arabia
| 2005 | World Youth Championships | Marrakesh, Morocco | 5th | 110 m hurdles (91.4 cm) | 13.66 |
| 2007 | Asian Championships | Amman, Jordan | 9th (h) | 110 m hurdles | 14.33 |
| 2007 | Asian Indoor Games | Macau, China | 10th (h) | 60 m hurdles | 8.20 |
| 2008 | Asian Indoor Championships | Doha, Qatar | 6th | 60 m hurdles | 8.05 |
| 2009 | Arab Championships | Damascus, Syria | 2nd | 110 m hurdles | 13.92 |
| 2009 | Arab Championships | Damascus, Syria | 1st | 4 × 100 m relay | 40.09 |
| 2009 | Asian Indoor Games | Hanoi, Vietnam | 4th | 60 m hurdles | 7.85 |
| 2009 | Asian Championships | Guangzhou, China | 7th (h) | 110 m hurdles | 14.02^{1} |
| 2010 | West Asian Championships | Aleppo, Syria | 1st (h) | 110 m hurdles | 13.98^{2} |
| 2010 | Asian Games | Guangzhou, China | 4th | 110 m hurdles | 13.77 |
| 2010 | Asian Games | Guangzhou, China | 6th | 4 × 100 m relay | 40.01 |
| 2011 | Asian Championships | Kobe, Japan | – | 110 m hurdles | DQ |
| 2011 | Military World Games | Rio de Janeiro, Brazil | 6th | 110 m hurdles | 14.02 |
| 2011 | Military World Games | Rio de Janeiro, Brazil | 6th | 4 × 100 m relay | 40.71 |
| 2011 | Arab Championships | Al Ain, United Arab Emirates | 4th | 110 m hurdles | 13.81 |
| 2011 | Pan Arab Games | Doha, Qatar | 1st | 110 m hurdles | 13.60 |
| 2011 | Pan Arab Games | Doha, Qatar | 1st | 4 × 100 m relay | 39.67 |
| 2013 | Arab Championships | Radès, Tunisia | – | 110 m hurdles | DQ |
| 2015 | Asian Championships | Wuhan, China | 14th (h) | 110 m hurdles | 14.18 |
| 2015 | Asian Championships | Wuhan, China | 8th (h) | 4 × 100 m relay | 40.22 |
| 2015 | Military World Games | Mungyeong, South Korea | 5th (h) | 110 m hurdles | 14.14^{1} |
| 2017 | Islamic Solidarity Games | Baku, Azerbaijan | 1st | 110 m hurdles | 13.68 |
| 2017 | Islamic Solidarity Games | Baku, Azerbaijan | 6th | 4 × 100 m relay | 40.61 |
| 2017 | Asian Championships | Bhubaneswar, India | 3rd | 110 m hurdles | 13.61 |
| 2017 | Arab Championships | Radès, Tunisia | 1st | 4 × 100 m relay | 40.08 |
| 2017 | Asian Indoor and Martial Arts Games | Ashgabat, Turkmenistan | 1st | 60 m hurdles | 7.66 |
| 2018 | World Indoor Championships | Birmingham, United Kingdom | 12th (sf) | 60 m hurdles | 7.66 |
| 2018 | Asian Games | Jakarta, Indonesia | 4th | 110 m hurdles | 13.50 |
| 2019 | Arab Championships | Cairo, Egypt | 2nd | 110 m hurdles | 13.90 |
| 2019 | Asian Championships | Doha, Qatar | 10th (h) | 110 m hurdles | 13.88 |

^{1}Disqualified in the final

^{2}Did not finish in the final
