= 2007 Asian Athletics Championships – Men's 110 metres hurdles =

The men's 110 metres hurdles event at the 2007 Asian Athletics Championships was held in Amman, Jordan on July 28–29.

== Medalists ==
Gold	Silver	Bronze
Tasuku Tanonaka; Japan	Mohamed Issa Al-Thawadi; Qatar	Wu Youjia; China

== Results ==
=== Heats ===
Wind: Heat 1: +0.2 m/s, Heat 2: -0.9 m/s

Rank	Heat	Name	Nationality	Time	Notes
1	2	Mohamed Issa Al-Thawadi	Qatar	13.62	Q
2	1	Wu Youjia	China	13.65	Q
3	1	Tasuku Tanonaka	Japan	13.73	Q
4	1	Park Tae-Kyong	South Korea	13.89	Q
4	2	Kenji Yahata	Japan	13.89	Q
6	2	Rohollah Asgari Gandmani	Iran	13.93	Q
7	1	Fawaz Al-Shammari	Kuwait	14.05	q
8	2	Ali Hussain Al-Zaki	Saudi Arabia	14.09	q
9	1	Ahmad Al-Molad	Saudi Arabia	14.33	
10	2	Tang Hon Sing	Hong Kong	14.41	
11	2	Muhammad Shah	Pakistan	14.46	
12	2	Rayzam Shah Wan Sofian	Malaysia	14.53	
13	1	Abdul Hakeem Abdul Halim	Singapore	14.87	
	1	Muhd Faiz Mohammad	Malaysia	DNF	
	1	Ali Hazer	Lebanon	DNS	
	2	Onar Oshana	Syria	DNS	

=== Final ===
Wind: +5.3 m/s

Rank	Lane	Name	Nationality	Time	Notes
1st place, gold medalist(s)	3	Tasuku Tanonaka	Japan	13.51	
2nd place, silver medalist(s)	4	Mohamed Issa Al-Thawadi	Qatar	13.55	
3rd place, bronze medalist(s)	5	Wu Youjia	China	13.68	
4	2	Park Tae-Kyong	South Korea	13.81	
5	6	Kenji Yahata	Japan	13.86	
6	1	Ali Hussain Al-Zaki	Saudi Arabia	13.88	
7	8	Fawaz Al-Shammari	Kuwait	14.12	
8	7	Rohollah Asgari Gandmani	Iran	14.20	
