= Ahmad Hazer =

Lebanese hurdler (born 1989)

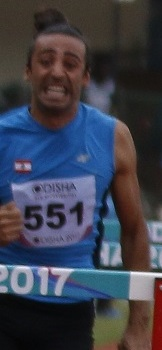
- Ahmad Hazer in 2017

Personal information
- Born: 4 September 1989 (age 36) Beirut, Lebanon
- Height: 1.89 m (6 ft 2 1/2 in)
- Weight: 81 kg (179 lb)

Sport
- Country: Lebanon
- Sport: Athletics
- Event: 110 metres hurdles

Ahmad Hazer (born 4 September 1989) is a Lebanese hurdler. He holds several national records including the 110m hurdles.

== Early life ==
Hazer grew up in Beirut, Lebanon. His older brother, Ali Hazer, is also an athlete.

== Career ==
He competed in the 60 m indoor hurdles at the 2010 IAAF World Indoor Championships with a time of 8.36 s and in the 110 meter hurdles at the 2012 Summer Olympics with a time of 14.82, as he came in last in the first round, heat four, and was eliminated. Hazer holds several Lebanese records, including the 110 m hurdles and 300 m. He was the first Lebanese athlete to run sub 14s over 110m hurdles.

Hazer tested positive for the anabolic steroid Metenolone, in an out-of-competition control 11 June 2013. He was subsequently handed a two-year ban from the sport.

== International competitions ==
| Year | Competition | Venue | Position | Event | Notes |
Representing Lebanon
| 2008 | Asian Junior Championships | Jakarta, Indonesia | 13th (h) | 110 m hurdles (99 cm) | 14.70 |
| 2008 | Asian Junior Championships | Jakarta, Indonesia | 15th (h) | 400 m hurdles (91.4 cm) | 57.29 |
| 2008 | World Junior Championships | Bydgoszcz, Poland | 54th (h) | 110 m hurdles (99 cm) | 14.75 |
| 2009 | Universiade | Belgrade, Serbia | – | 110 m hurdles | DNF |
| 2009 | World Championships | Berlin, Germany | 44th (h) | 110 m hurdles | 14.74 |
| 2009 | Jeux de la Francophonie | Beirut, Lebanon | 6th | 110 m hurdles | 14.38 |
| 2009 | Jeux de la Francophonie | Beirut, Lebanon | 7th | 4 × 400 m relay | 3:15.73 |
| 2009 | Asian Championships | Guangzhou, China | 12th (h) | 110 m hurdles | 14.84 |
| 2010 | World Indoor Championships | Doha, Qatar | 27th (h) | 60 m hurdles | 8.36 (iNR) |
| 2011 | Asian Championships | Kobe, Japan | 10th (h) | 110 m hurdles | 14.25 |
| 2011 | Universiade | Shenzhen, China | 48th (h) | 100 m | 11.01 |
| 2011 | Universiade | Shenzhen, China | 22nd (sf) | 110 m hurdles | 14.46 |
| 2011 | World Championships | Daegu, South Korea | 31st (h) | 110 m hurdles | 14.42 |
| 2011 | Pan Arab Games | Doha, Qatar | 7th | 110 m hurdles | 14.70 |
| 2012 | Olympic Games | London, United Kingdom | 45th (h) | 110 m hurdles | 14.82 |
| 2013 | Mediterranean Games | Mersin, Turkey | 5th | 110 m hurdles | 14.13 |
| 2013 | Asian Championships | Pune, India | 10th (h) | 110 m hurdles | 14.13 |
| 2013 | Universiade | Kazan, Russia | 14th (h) | 110 m hurdles | 14.11 |
| 2016 | Olympic Games | Rio de Janeiro, Brazil | 36th (h) | 110 m hurdles | 15.50 |
| 2017 | Asian Championships | Bhubaneswar, India | 20th (h) | 110 m hurdles | 14.65 |
| 2017 | Jeux de la Francophonie | Abidjan, Ivory Coast | 6th | 110 m hurdles | 14.63 |
| 2017 | Jeux de la Francophonie | Abidjan, Ivory Coast | 8th | 4 × 100 m relay | 42.66 |
| 2017 | World Championships | London, United Kingdom | 38th (h) | 110 m hurdles | 14.51 |
| 2017 | Universiade | Taipei, Taiwan | 21st (h) | 110 m hurdles | 14.97 |
| 2017 | Asian Indoor and Martial Arts Games | Ashgabat, Turkmenistan | 7th | 60 m hurdles | 8.23 |
| 2018 | Asian Indoor Championships | Tehran, Iran | 12th (h) | 60 m hurdles | 8.38 |
