= Park Tae-kyong =

South Korean hurdler

Medal record

Men's athletics

Representing South Korea

Asian Championships
Silver medal – second place	2003 Manila	110 m hurdles
Bronze medal – third place	2000 Jakarta	110 m hurdles
Bronze medal – third place	2009 Guangzhou	110 m hurdles

Park Tae-kyong (born 30 July 1980) is a male hurdler from South Korea. His personal best time is 13.48 seconds, achieved at the 2010 Asian Games in Guangzhou. This was the South Korean record until 2014

== Competition record ==
Year	Competition	Venue	Position	Event	Notes
Representing South Korea
2000	Asian Championships	Jakarta, Indonesia	3rd	110 m hurdles	14.16
2002	Asian Games	Busan, South Korea	3rd	110 m hurdles	13.89
2003	Universiade	Daegu, South Korea	3rd	110 m hurdles	13.78
2003	Asian Championships	Manila, Philippines	2nd	110 m hurdles	13.71
2003	Afro-Asian Games	Hyderabad, India	2nd	110 m hurdles	13.83
2004	Olympic Games	Athens, Greece	44th (h)	110 m hurdles	13.96
2005	Asian Championships	Incheon, South Korea	5th	110 m hurdles	14.04
2006	Asian Games	Doha, Qatar	4th	110 m hurdles	13.67 (=NR)
2009	World Championships	Berlin, Germany	40th (h)	110 m hurdles	13.93
2009	Asian Championships	Guangzhou, China	3rd	110 m hurdles	13.82
2009	East Asian Games	Hong Kong	3rd	110 m hurdles	14.02
2007	Asian Championships	Amman, Jordan	4th	110 m hurdles	13.81w
2010	Asian Games	Guangzhou, China	3rd	110 m hurdles	13.48
2011	Asian Championships	Kobe, Japan	3rd	110 m hurdles	13.66
2011	World Championships	Daegu, South Korea	26th (h)	110 m hurdles	13.83
2013	Asian Championships	Pune, India	7th (h)	110 m hurdles	13.96
2014	Asian Games	Incheon, South Korea	9th (h)	110 m hurdles	13.77
