= Mubarak Ata Mubarak =

Saudi Arabian hurdler (born 1981)

Medal record

Men's athletics

Representing Saudi Arabia

Asian Championships
Gold medal – first place	2000 Jakarta	110 m hurdles
Silver medal – second place	2002 Colombo	110 m hurdles
Silver medal – second place	2002 Colombo	4×100 m
Bronze medal – third place	2000 Jakarta	4×100 m
Bronze medal – third place	2005 Incheon	4×100 m

Mubarak Ata Mubarak (born 17 December 1981) is a Saudi Arabian hurdler. His personal best time is 13.68 seconds, achieved in July 2004 in Lapinlahti.

He won the gold medal at the 2000 Asian Championships, the silver medal at the 2002 Asian Championships and finished fifth at the 2005 Asian Championships. He also competed at the 2001 World Championships as well as the Olympic Games in 2000 and 2004 without reaching the final.

== International competitions ==
Year	Competition	Venue	Position	Event	Notes
Representing Saudi Arabia
1999	Asian Junior Championships	Singapore	6th	110 m hurdles	14.79
2000	Asian Championships	Jakarta, Indonesia	1st	110 m hurdles	14.02
2000	Asian Championships	Jakarta, Indonesia	3rd	4 × 100 m relay	39.60
2000	Olympic Games	Sydney, Australia	30th (h)	4 × 100 m relay	39.94
2001	World Championships	Edmonton, Canada	22nd (sf)	110 m hurdles	13.98
2001	World Championships	Edmonton, Canada	9th (sf)	4 × 100 m relay	39.04
2002	Asian Championships	Colombo, Sri Lanka	2nd	110 m hurdles	13.96
2002	Asian Games	Busan, South Korea	5th	110 m hurdles	14.07
2002	Asian Games	Busan, South Korea	5th	4 × 100 m relay	40.00
2003	World Championships	Paris, France	– (h)	4 × 100 m relay	DNF
2004	Olympic Games	Athens, Greece	40th (h)	110 m hurdles	13.81
2004	Pan Arab Games	Algiers, Algeria	2nd	110 m hurdles	13.71
2004	Pan Arab Games	Algiers, Algeria	1st	4 × 100 m relay	39.40
2005	Islamic Solidarity Games	Mecca, Saudi Arabia	1st	110 m hurdles	13.70
2005	Asian Championships	Incheon, South Korea	6th	110 m hurdles	14.13
2005	Asian Championships	Incheon, South Korea	3rd	4 × 100 m relay	39.25
2006	Asian Games	Doha, Qatar	9th (h)	110 m hurdles	14.24
2006	Asian Games	Doha, Qatar	6th	4 × 100 m relay	40.18
2009	Asian Championships	Guangzhou, China	7th	110 m hurdles	14.61
