= Svetlana Pessova =

Turkmenistani long jumper

Personal information
- Full name: Svetlana Pessova
- Nationality: Turkmenistan
- Born: 27 September 1981 (age 44) Ashgabat, Turkmen SSR, Soviet Union
- Height: 1.76 m (5 ft 9 1/2 in)
- Weight: 65 kg (143 lb)

Sport
- Sport: Athletics
- Event: Long jump

Achievements and titles
- Personal best: Long jump: 6.63 (2004)
Medal record
Women's athletics
Representing Turkmenistan
Asian Indoor Championships
Bronze medal – third place	2004 Tehran	Pentathlon

Svetlana Pessova (born 27 September 1981 in Ashgabat) is a retired Turkmen long jumper. Pessova qualified for the Turkmen squad in the women's long jump at the 2004 Summer Olympics in Athens by granting a tripartite invitation from the National Olympic Committee of Turkmenistan and the IAAF with her entry jump of 6.63 metres. During the prelims, Pessova fouled her first attempt, but managed to put down a tremendous effort with a 5.64-metre leap on her second attempt, missing the target by nearly a single metre from her personal best. Taking a leap by a six-centimetre deficit on her last attempt, Pessova became the last among the thirty-seven remaining long jumpers to earn a spot on the overall standings at the end of the qualifying stage.
