= Shi Dongpeng =

Chinese hurdler (born 1982)

- Shi Dongpeng in 2007

Medal record

Men's Athletics

Representing China

Asian Games
| Silver medal – second place | 2006 Doha | 110 m hurdles |
| Silver medal – second place | 2010 Guangzhou | 110 m hurdles |

Asian Athletics Championships
| Gold medal – first place | 2003 Manila | 110 m hurdles |
| Silver medal – second place | 2005 Incheon | 110 m hurdles |
| Silver medal – second place | 2009 Guangzhou | 110 m hurdles |
| Silver medal – second place | 2011 Kobe | 110 m hurdles |

Continental Cup
| Bronze medal – third place | 2010 Split | 110 m hurdles |

Shi Dongpeng (simplified Chinese: 史冬鹏; traditional Chinese: 史冬鵬; pinyin: Shǐ Dōngpéng, born January 6, 1982, in Hebei, People's Republic of China) is a Chinese hurdler who specializes in the 110 metre hurdles.

Shi won a silver medal at the 2002 World Junior Championships in Kingston, Jamaica, finished sixth at the 2003 World Championships in Paris, France, and won a silver medal at the 2006 Asian Games in Doha, Qatar. At the Asian Championships he won a gold in 2003 and silver in 2005.

Shi's personal best time is 13.19 seconds, achieved in August 2007 in Osaka, Japan, at the 2007 World Championships in Athletics.

In 2022, The Athletics Integrity Unit disqualified Shi from the 2002 World Junior Championships, having confirmed that his actual birth year was 1982 and not 1984.

== Competition record ==
| Year | Competition | Venue | Position | Event | Notes |
Representing China
| 2001 | Asian Junior Championships | Bandar Seri Begawan, Brunei | 1st | 110 m hurdles | 14.05 |
| 2002 | World Junior Championships | Kingston, Jamaica | disqualified | 110 m hurdles | 13.58 w (wind: +2.6 m/s) |
| 2002 | Asian Games | Busan, South Korea | 4th | 110 m hurdles | 13.92 |
| 2003 | World Indoor Championships | Birmingham, United Kingdom | 18th (h) | 60 m hurdles | 7.81 |
| 2003 | World Championships | Paris, France | 6th | 110 m hurdles | 13.55 |
| 2003 | Asian Championships | Manila, Philippines | 1st | 110 m hurdles | 13.50 |
| 2004 | World Indoor Championships | Budapest, Hungary | 17th (h) | 60 m hurdles | 7.75 |
| 2004 | Olympic Games | Athens, Greece | 33rd (h) | 110 m hurdles | 13.68 |
| 2005 | World Championships | Helsinki, Finland | 9th (sf) | 110 m hurdles | 13.44 |
| 2005 | Asian Championships | Incheon, South Korea | 2nd | 110 m hurdles | 13.44 |
| 2006 | World Indoor Championships | Moscow, Russia | 8th (sf) | 60 m hurdles | 7.63 |
| 2006 | Asian Games | Doha, Qatar | 2nd | 110 m hurdles | 13.28 |
| 2007 | World Championships | Osaka, Japan | 5th | 110 m hurdles | 13.19 |
| 2008 | World Indoor Championships | Valencia, Spain | 9th (sf) | 60 m hurdles | 7.65 |
| 2008 | Olympic Games | Beijing, China | 8th (sf) | 110 m hurdles | 13.42 |
| 2009 | Asian Championships | Guangzhou, China | 2nd | 110 m hurdles | 13.67 |
| 2009 | World Championships | Berlin, Germany | 8th (sf) | 110 m hurdles | 13.42 |
| 2010 | World Indoor Championships | Doha, Qatar | 16th (sf) | 60 m hurdles | 7.82 |
| 2010 | Asian Games | Guangzhou, China | 2nd | 110 m hurdles | 13.38 |
| 2011 | Asian Championships | Kobe, Japan | 2nd | 110 m hurdles | 13.56 |
| 2011 | World Championships | Daegu, South Korea | 9th (sf) | 110 m hurdles | 13.57 |
| 2012 | World Indoor Championships | Istanbul, Turkey | 24th (h) | 60m hurdles | 8.15 |
| 2012 | Olympic Games | London, United Kingdom | 37th (h) | 110 m hurdles | 13.78 |
