= Nazar Begliyev =

Turkmen runner

Personal information
- Full name: Nazar Begliyev
- Nationality: Turkmenistan
- Born: 27 April 1980 (age 46) Ashgabat, Turkmen SSR, Soviet Union
- Height: 1.85 m (6 ft 1 in)
- Weight: 75 kg (165 lb)

Sport
- Sport: Athletics
- Event: Middle-distance running

Achievements and titles
- Personal best: 800 m: 1:49.64 (2004)

Nazar Begliyev (born April 27, 1980 in Ashgabat) is a retired Turkmen middle-distance runner, who specialized in the 800 metres. Begliyev qualified for the Turkmen squad in the men's 800 metres at the 2004 Summer Olympics in Athens, by granting a tripartite invitation from the National Olympic Committee of Turkmenistan and the IAAF with an entry standard time of 1:50.20. He overhauled the 1:50 barrier and lowered his own personal best at 1:49.64 in the first heat, but crashed out of the prelims to sixth and did not advance further into the semifinals, trailing behind the leader and eventual silver medalist Mbulaeni Mulaudzi of South Africa by four seconds.
