= Athletics at the 2005 Islamic Solidarity Games =

Athletics competition

Athletics at the 1st Islamic Solidarity Games
- Dates: April 12–16, 2005
- Host city: Mecca, Saudi Arabia
- Venue: King Abdul Aziz Stadium
- Level: Senior
- Events: 23

Athletics were contested at the 2005 Islamic Solidarity Games in Mecca, Saudi Arabia from April 12 to April 16, 2005.

== Medal summary ==
Event	Gold		Silver		Bronze	
100 m	Salem Al-Yami; Saudi Arabia	10.21	Idrissa Sanou; Burkina Faso	10.27	Jamal Al-Saffar; Saudi Arabia	10.36
200 m	Hamed Hamadan Al-Bishi; Saudi Arabia	20.72	Joseph Batangdon; Cameroon	20.73	Oumar Loum; Senegal	21.10
400 m	Nagmeldin Ali Abubakr; Sudan	44.93	Hamdan Odha Al-Bishi; Saudi Arabia	45.57	Abdellatif El Ghazaoui; Morocco	46.57
800 m	Amine Laâlou; Morocco	1:45.96	Mohammed Al-Salhi; Saudi Arabia	1:46.19	Ismail Ahmed Ismail; Sudan	1:47.20
1500 m	Tarek Boukensa; Algeria	3:47.01	Youssef Baba; Morocco	3:47.61	Antar Zerguelaïne; Algeria	3:47.90
5000 m	Adil Kaouch; Morocco	14:11.25	Khoudir Aggoune; Algeria	14:11.32	Samir Moussaoui; Algeria	14:12.84
10,000 m	Khalid El Aamri; Morocco	28:40.33	Mukhlid Al-Otaibi; Saudi Arabia	28:41.81	Boniface Kiprop; Uganda	28:46.27
Marathon	Zäid Laâroussi; Morocco	2:16:28	Saïd Belhout; Algeria	2:21:16	Nasser Bilal Haj; Sudan	2:23:01
110 m h	Mubarak Ata Mubarak; Saudi Arabia	13.70	Todd Matthews-Jouda; Sudan	13.79	Rouhollah Asgari; Iran	13.92
400 m h	Ibrahim Al-Hamaidi; Saudi Arabia	49.55	Hadi Soua'an Al-Somaily; Saudi Arabia	50.78	Abderrahmane Hammadi; Algeria	50.91
3000 m st.	Merzak Ould Bouchiba; Algeria	8:50.84	Yousif Idriss Musa; Sudan	8:54.15	Imed Zaidi; Tunisia	8:56.62
20 km walk	Hassanine Sebei; Tunisia	1:30:48	Moussa Aouanouk; Algeria	1:32:41	Mohd Sharrulhaizy Abdul Rahman; Malaysia	1:35:57
4 x 100 m	Saudi Arabia; Farag Al-Dosari; Jamal Al-Saffar; Yahya Al-Ghahes; Salem Al-Yami	39.80	Oman; Juma Al-Jabri; Youssef Thani; Fahad Al-Jabri; Ahmed Nasser Al-Wahaibi	40.13	Ivory Coast; Ben Youssef Meïté; Koffi Kouadio; Ubrich Tiékoura Kouassi; Tolra Kasaye	40.87
4 x 400 m	Saudi Arabia; Ibrahim Al-Hamaidi; Hadi Soua'an Al-Somaily; Hamdan Al-Bishi; Mohammed Al-Salhi	3:04.35	Sudan; Nagmeldin Ali Abubakr; Adam Mohamed Al-Noor; Ismail Ahmed Ismail; Abdulgadir Idriss	3:08.81	Morocco; Abdellatif El Ghazaoui; Abdelkrim Khoudri; Ismael Daif; Amine Laâlou	3:09.13
High jump	Omar Moussa Al-Masrahi; Saudi Arabia	2.20m	Ahmed Farouk Abdel Zaher; Egypt	2.17m	Boubacar Séré; Burkina Faso	2.14m
Pole vault	Mohamed Karbib; Morocco	5.20m	Ali Al-Sabbaghah; Kuwait	5.10m	Mohsen Rabbani; Iran	5.10m
Long jump	Mohammed Al-Khuwalidi; Saudi Arabia	8.44m	Issam Nima; Algeria	8.11m	Ndiss Kaba Badji; Senegal	8.02m
Triple jump	Mohammad Hazzory; Syria	16.39m	Ndiss Kaba Badji; Senegal	16.34m	Hamza Ménina; Algeria	16.03m
Shot put	Sultan Al-Hebshi; Saudi Arabia	18.97m	Amin Nikfar; Iran	18.73m	Mehdi Shahrokhi; Iran	18.27m
Discus	Omar Ahmed El Ghazaly; Egypt	59.89m	Sultan Al-Dawoodi; Saudi Arabia	59.00m	Ehsan Haddadi; Iran	58.66m
Hammer	Dilshod Nazarov; Tajikistan	76.98m	Ali Al-Zenkawi; Kuwait	75.96m	Saber Souid; Tunisia	71.36m
Javelin	Ayoub Arokhi; Iran	70.66m	Firas Al Mahamid; Syria	65.26m	Wisam Shahal Al-Khizai; Iraq	64.56m
Decathlon	Moulay Rachid Alaoui Hakim; Morocco	7010 pts	Mourad Souissi; Algeria	6866 pts	Rédouane Youcef; Algeria	6817 pts

== Medal table ==
Rank	Nation	Gold	Silver	Bronze	Total
1	Saudi Arabia	9	5	1	15
2	Morocco	6	1	2	9
3	Algeria	2	5	5	12
4	Sudan	1	3	2	6
5	Iran	1	1	4	6
6	Egypt	1	1	0	2
6	Syria	1	1	0	2
8	Tunisia	1	0	2	3
9	Tajikistan	1	0	0	1
10	Kuwait	0	2	0	2
11	Senegal	0	1	2	3
12	Burkina Faso	0	1	1	2
13	Cameroon	0	1	0	1
13	Oman	0	1	0	1
15	Iraq	0	0	1	1
15	Ivory Coast	0	0	1	1
15	Malaysia	0	0	1	1
15	Uganda	0	0	1	1
Totals (18 entries)		23	23	23	69
