= Liu Xiang (hurdler) =

Chinese hurdler (born 1983)

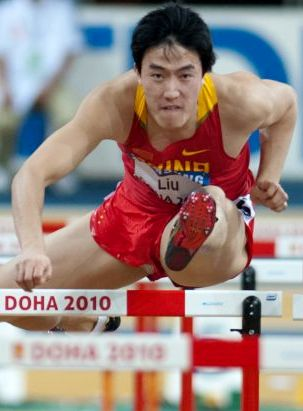
- Liu in 2010

Personal information
- Nationality: Chinese
- Born: July 13, 1983 (age 43) Putuo District, Shanghai
- Height: 1.89 m (6 ft 2 in)
- Weight: 87 kg (192 lb)

Sport
- Country: China
- Sport: Athletics
- Event: 110 m hurdles

Achievements and titles
- Personal bests: 50 m hurdles 6.44 s AR (Liévin 2004); 60 m hurdles: 7.41 s AR (Birmingham 2012); 110 m hurdles: 12.88 s AR (+1.1 m/s) (Lausanne 2006); 200 m: 21.27 s (+0.6 m/s) (Shanghai 2002)
Medal record
Men's athletics
Representing China
Olympic Games
Gold medal – first place	2004 Athens	110 m hurdles
World Championships
Gold medal – first place	2007 Osaka	110 m hurdles
Silver medal – second place	2005 Helsinki	110 m hurdles
Silver medal – second place	2011 Daegu	110 m hurdles
Bronze medal – third place	2003 Paris	110 m hurdles
World Indoor Championships
Gold medal – first place	2008 Valencia	60 m hurdles
Silver medal – second place	2004 Budapest	60 m hurdles
Silver medal – second place	2012 Istanbul	60 m hurdles
Bronze medal – third place	2003 Birmingham	60 m hurdles
Asian Games
Gold medal – first place	2002 Busan	110 m hurdles
Gold medal – first place	2006 Doha	110 m hurdles
Gold medal – first place	2010 Guangzhou	110 m hurdles
Asian Championships
Gold medal – first place	2002 Colombo	110 m hurdles
Gold medal – first place	2005 Incheon	110 m hurdles
Gold medal – first place	2009 Guangzhou	110 m hurdles
Summer Universiade
Gold medal – first place	2001 Beijing	110 m hurdles
- Updated on July 12, 2012

Liu Xiang
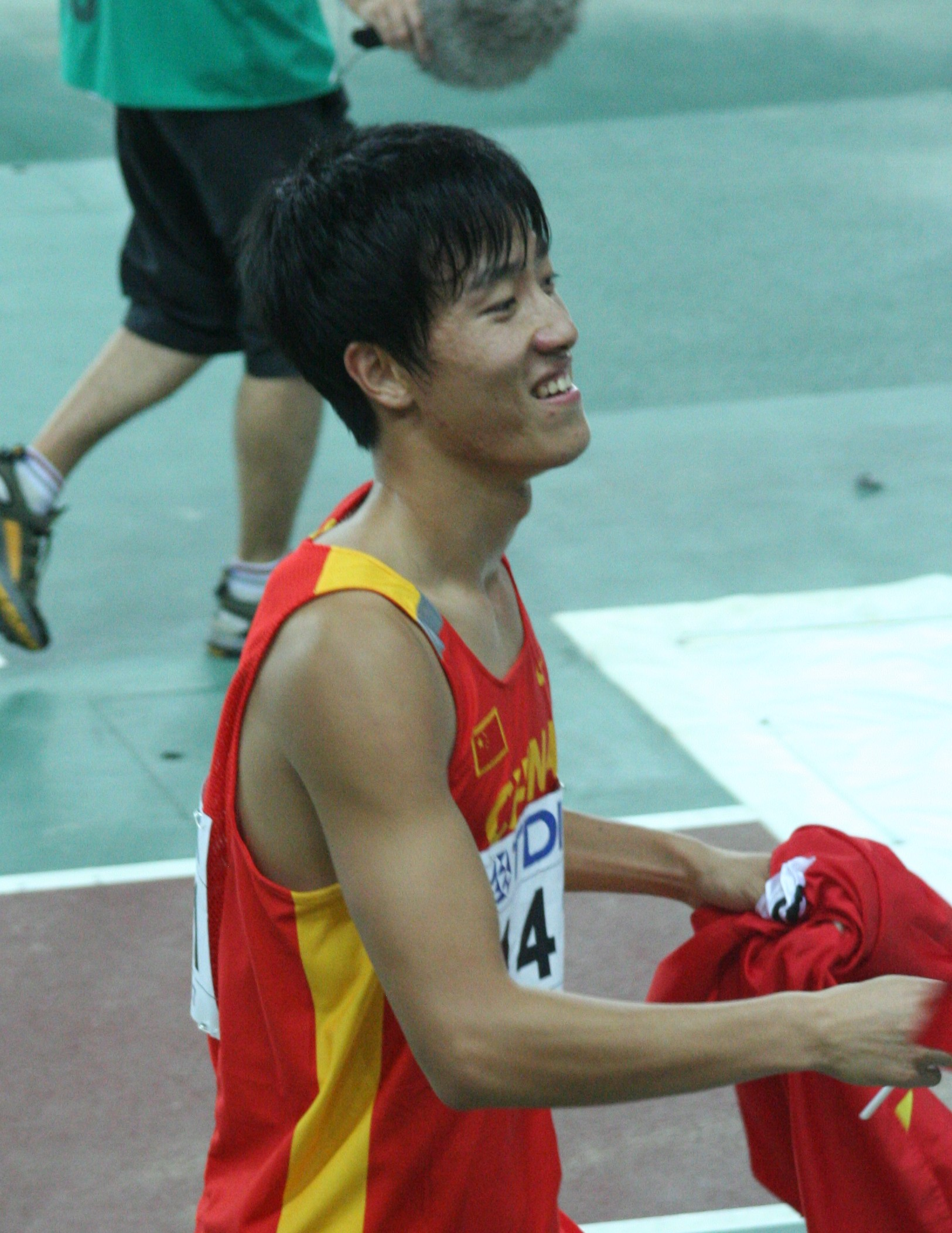
- Liu Xiang celebrating at the 2007 World Championship as he became World Champion.
- Simplified Chinese: 刘翔
- Traditional Chinese: 劉翔
- Hanyu Pinyin: Liú Xiáng
Transcriptions
Standard Mandarin
- Hanyu Pinyin: Liú Xiáng
- Wade–Giles: Liu Hsiang
Yue: Cantonese
- Yale Romanization: Lau4 cheung4
- Jyutping: Lau4 Coeng4

Liu Xiang (simplified Chinese: 刘翔; traditional Chinese: 劉翔; pinyin: Liú Xiáng; born July 13, 1983) is a Chinese former 110 meter hurdler. Liu is an Olympic gold medalist and world champion. His 2004 Olympic gold medal was China's first Olympic gold medal in men's athletics.

Liu is one of China's most successful athletes and has emerged as a cultural icon. On top of being the only male athlete in history to be the 110-metre hurdles world record holder, world champion, and Olympic champion, Liu remains the Olympic record holder for the men's 110-metre hurdles with a time of 12.91 seconds he set at the 2004 Athens Olympics. He was the favorite to win another gold in the 110 metre hurdles at the 2008 Beijing Olympics, but had to withdraw from competition at the last moment after a false start and aggravation to a previously unrevealed injury. Again a gold medal favourite in the 110 metre hurdles at the 2012 London Olympics, he tore his Achilles tendon while attempting to clear the first hurdle in the heats. On 7 April 2015, he announced his retirement on Sina Weibo.

== Career ==
=== Early career ===
In May 2001, Liu won at the East Asian Games in Osaka, Japan with a time of 13.42 seconds. In August 2001, he won at the Universiade in Beijing with a time of 13.33 seconds. He also won at the 2001 National Games of China that same year.

In 2002 Liu set an Asian record time at the Athletissima meeting, completing the event in 13.12 seconds. This also broke Renaldo Nehemiah's long standing and world junior record, which had stood for almost 25 years. The following year he secured bronze medals in the 60 metres hurdles at the 2003 IAAF World Indoor Championships and the 110 m hurdles at the 2003 World Championships in Athletics.

=== 2004 Olympics ===
In May 2004 at an IAAF Grand Prix race in Osaka, Japan, Liu managed to beat Allen Johnson with a personal best record time of 13.06 seconds. He improved even further at the 2004 Athens Olympics. Although he was not considered a favourite for the event, he won the Olympic final by some distance to pocket the gold medal with 12.91 seconds, tying the world record set by Colin Jackson 11 years before. This was a new Olympic record and was almost three tenths of a second faster than the runner-up Terrence Trammell. The performance had Liu become the sixth man to run under 13 seconds in the event and was China's first men's Olympic gold medal in a athletics event. On top of this, he defied the belief that Asian athletes could not compete in sprint events at the elite level. He said that his gold medal "changes the opinion that Asian countries don't get good results in sprint races. I want to prove to all the world that Asians can run very fast."

Liu, a 21-year-old East China Normal University student at the time of victory in Athens, became the target of a bidding war among commercial sponsors. The Chinese Track and Field Association limited him to four such deals.

Liu finished the season with four of the year's ten fastest clockings. Reaching 17 finals in the 60-metre indoor and 110-metre outdoor hurdles, he lost just two, both to American Allen Johnson.

=== 2005 and 2007 World Championships ===
In August 2005, Liu won a silver medal at the IAAF World Championships in Athletics in Helsinki, Finland, finishing in 13.08 seconds, 0.01 second after champion Ladji Doucouré from France. In November 2005, he won the East Asian Games in Macau, China, with a time of 13.21 seconds.

Off track, in May, Liu was awarded the Laureus World Sports Award for Newcomer of the Year for his breakthrough performance at the 2004 Summer Olympics in Athens.

On July 11, 2006, Liu set a new world record in the 110 metre hurdles at the Super Grand Prix in Lausanne with a time of 12.88 seconds (+1.1 m/s tailwind). The record was ratified by the IAAF (now World Athletics). In that same race, American Dominique Arnold had also beaten the previous record with a time of 12.90 seconds. In September, he won gold at IAAF World Athletics Final in Stuttgart, Germany, with a time of 12.93 seconds.

On August 31, 2007, at the World Athletics Championships in Osaka, Japan, Liu won gold in the 110-metre hurdles with a time of 12.95 seconds to become the world champion.

On 23 May, Liu participated in a test event at the Beijing National Stadium. He pulled out of the Reebok Grand Prix in New York on May 31, citing hamstring problems. On 8 June, he false-started at the Prefontaine Classic at Eugene, Oregon. Liu skipped the entire European circuit, preferring to train for the Olympics in China instead.

=== Beijing Olympics ===
Leading up to the Summer Olympics in Beijing, Liu bore national expectations of a repeat victory on home soil. On August 18, Liu withdrew from the Olympic 110 metre hurdles. He walked off the track after a false start by another runner in his first-round heat, leaving the crowd at the Beijing National Stadium in stunned silence, confusion, and tears. According to Jeré Longman of The New York Times, "China's greatest hope had been dashed".

According to China's track and field association, Liu suffered from a recurrence of chronic inflammation in his right Achilles tendon. Liu's coach, Sun Haiping, addressed the media during a press conference and stated that the hurdler had been hampered by a tendon injury for six or seven years. He commented on the situation, saying "We worked hard every day, but the result was as you see and it is really hard to take." Sun, who was in tears for most of the press conference, stated that Liu would be unable to compete for the remainder of 2008. Liu made a public apology to the Chinese media the following day, saying he could "do nothing but pull out of the race" because of his foot injury. He believed that the injury would not prevent him from future competitions and vowed to "come back" for the next Olympics.

Liu's injury was significant and also ruled him out of the following year's major competition, the 2009 World Championships in Athletics. However, coach Sun Haiping was confident that he would return in time for the Chinese national championships and 2009 Asian Championships in Athletics in November.

=== 2009–2011: Return from injury ===
After a 13-month absence because of his injury, Liu finally returned to competition at the Shanghai Golden Grand Prix. Liu recorded a time of 13.15, tied with Terrence Trammell, but finished 0.01 second behind the winner and was awarded second place. However, Liu said he was happy with his performance. Nearing the end of the year, he competed at a number of major events on home turf. He won gold medals at the 2009 Asian Athletics Championships, the East Asian Games and the 11th Chinese National Games.

At the 2010 IAAF World Indoor Championships in Doha, admitting that his right foot had yet to fully recover, Liu was able to finish in the finals of the 60 m hurdles but managed only seventh place. His sole appearance on the 2010 IAAF Diamond League circuit was marked by the Shanghai Grand Prix, which he lost to national rival Shi Dongpeng for the first time. Following a six-month break, he returned to form at the 2010 Asian Games. A crowd of 70,000 gathered at the Guangdong Olympic Stadium to see him in the final and he easily won his third consecutive title at the competition, breaking the Games record with a run of 13.09 seconds – making him the third fastest athlete that season.

The Shanghai Golden Grand Prix in May 2011 saw Liu make a return to a world class level: he defeated David Oliver (the fastest hurdler in 2010) with a world-leading mark of 13.07 seconds to take his first win on the 2011 IAAF Diamond League. Liu showed he had accomplished a transition in his technique, as he reduced his number of starting steps before the first hurdle from eight to seven, using his left leg for hurdling.

On 29 August 2011, Liu competed in the men's 110-metre hurdles final in the IAAF World Championships in Daegu, South Korea. He was in position to win a gold medal, but Dayron Robles entered Liu's lane and pulled him back, disrupting his race, and he finished the race in third place. His medal was upgraded to silver after Robles was disqualified.

=== 2012 season ===
In Liu's first competition of 2012, he was matched up against Robles at the Birmingham Indoor Grand Prix and this time he won cleanly with an Asian record time of 7.41 seconds for the 60 m hurdles. He was the favourite for the title at the 2012 IAAF World Indoor Championships, but was beaten by Aries Merritt and left with the silver medal. In the outdoor season, he set a 110 m hurdles meet record at the Golden Grand Prix Kawasaki, then ran 12.97 seconds to win at his home nation 2012 IAAF Diamond League meet, the Shanghai Golden Grand Prix. This was his first run under 13 seconds since 2007, and he beat Americans David Oliver and Jason Richardson by some distance. He followed this with a run of 12.87 seconds to win at the Prefontaine Classic, matching the world record time, albeit with wind-assistance of 2.4 m/s.

In the 110-metre hurdles at the London Olympics in 2012, Liu tore his Achilles tendon while attempting to clear the first hurdle. Liu hopped the full 110 metre stretch, was helped by a few of his fellow competitors, and was put into a wheel chair and led away. He kissed the last hurdle before he left the track. Colin Jackson described it as a "very sad sight indeed" for the sport. Liu's loss echoed strongly in the Chinese press but also sparked controversy. Some voices expressed support while others wondered why Liu chose to participate in spite of his injury. Liu even earned a nickname "Liu PaoPao" because of pullbacks in two consecutive Olympic Games. Liu had surgery on his Achilles tendon in Britain.

=== Retirement ===
On April 7, 2015, Liu announced his retirement in a statement posted to his Sina Weibo. He had not competed since the 2012 Olympic race. In his post, he wrote that he was retiring after two years of frustrating and ultimately futile rehabilitation: "Of course my heart is still willing, but my foot has again and again said no to me."

In 2016, Liu was chosen as one of the teams in Shenzhen TV's reality program The Amazing Race China 3. Liu was initially paired up with his cousin Ji Longxiang on the first two legs, but Ji was later replaced with his best friend Xu Qifeng for the remainder of the race. They finished in 3rd place.

== Personal life ==
Liu is known for his low-profile appearance, but he has become one of the most popular athletes in China.

He was on Time magazine Asian edition's cover of the 2008 Summer Olympic Games titled "Liu Xiang & 99 More Athletes to Watch."

Liu donated approximately 2,500,000 yuan (US$364,000) to 2008 Sichuan earthquake relief efforts.

Liu married Ge Tian, a post-90s generation actress on September 7, 2014, after officially dating the actress for two years prior to their marriage. They divorced in 2015. On January 9, 2016, he announced a new relationship with pole vaulter Wu Sha, in his Sina Weibo. On December 1, 2016, Liu and Wu married in Fiji.

Liu's athletic gear is sponsored by Nike. He is also a spokesperson for Coca-Cola and Cadillac.

== International competition record ==
Year	Competition	Venue	Position	Event	Notes
Representing China
2000	World Junior Championships	Santiago, Chile	4th	110 m hurdles	13.87 (wind: -0.1 m/s)
2001	World University Games	Beijing, China	1st	110 m hurdles	13.33 seconds
2001	World Championships	Edmonton, Alberta, Canada	4th (semis)	110 m hurdles	13.51
2001	Chinese National Games	Guangzhou, China	1st	110 m hurdles	13.36
2001	East Asian Games	Osaka, Japan	1st	110 m hurdles	13.42 seconds
2002	Athletissima	Lausanne, Switzerland	2nd	110 m hurdles	13.12 seconds (WJR/AR)
2002	Asian Championships	Colombo, Sri Lanka	1st	110 m hurdles	13.56 seconds
2002	IAAF World Cup	Madrid, Spain	DNF	110 m hurdles	—
2002	Asian Games	Busan, South Korea	1st	110 m hurdles	13.27 seconds
2003	World Indoor Championships	Birmingham, United Kingdom	3rd	60 m hurdles	7.52 seconds
2003	World Championships	Paris, France	3rd	110 m hurdles	13.24 seconds
2003	World Athletics Final	Monaco	4th	110 m hurdles	13.27
2004	World Indoor Championships	Budapest, Hungary	2nd	60 m hurdles	7.43 seconds
2004	Olympic Games	Athens, Greece	1st	110 m hurdles	12.91 seconds (=WR)
2005	World Championships	Helsinki, Finland	2nd	110 m hurdles	13.08 seconds
2005	Chinese National Games	Nanjing, China	1st	110 m hurdles	13.10
2005	Asian Championships	Incheon, South Korea	1st	110 m hurdles	13.30
2005	East Asian Games	Macau, China	1st	110 m hurdles	13.21 seconds
2006	IAAF Super Grand Prix	Lausanne, Switzerland	1st	110 m hurdles	12.88 seconds (WR)
2006	World Athletics Final	Stuttgart, Germany	1st	110 m hurdles	12.93 seconds
2006	World Cup	Athens, Greece	2nd	110 m hurdles	13.03
2006	Asian Games	Doha, Qatar	1st	110 m hurdles	13.15 seconds
2007	World Championships	Osaka, Japan	1st	110 m hurdles	12.95 seconds
2008	World Indoor Championships	Valencia, Spain	1st	60 m hurdles	7.46 seconds
2008	Olympic Games	Beijing, China	DNF	110 m hurdles	Could not compete due to injury
2009	Chinese National Games	Jinan, China	1st	110 m hurdles	13.34
2009	Asian Championships	Guangzhou, China	1st	110 m hurdles	13.50 seconds
2009	East Asian Games	Hong Kong, China	1st	110 m hurdles	13.66 seconds
2010	World Indoor Championships	Doha, Qatar	7th	60 m hurdles	7.65
2010	Asian Games	Guangzhou, China	1st	110 m hurdles	13.09 seconds
2011	Asian Championships	Kobe, Japan	1st	110 m hurdles	13.22 CR
2011	World Championships	Daegu, South Korea	2nd	110 m hurdles	13.27 seconds
2012	World Indoor Championships	Istanbul, Turkey	2nd	60 m hurdles	7.49 seconds
2012	IAAF Diamond League	Eugene, Oregon, United States	1st	110 m hurdles	12.87s
2012	Olympic Games	London, United Kingdom	DNF	110 m hurdles	Did not finish due to injury

=== 110m hurdle records ===
As of 11 September 2024, Xiang holds the following track records for the 110 metres hurdles.

Location	Time	Windspeed m/s	Date
Athens	12.91; OR	+0.3	27 August 2004
Baoding	13.29	–0.8	8 September 2002
Busan	13.27	+0.3	9 October 2002
Changsha	13.31	0.0	25 October 2003
Guangzhou	13.09	+1.1	24 November 2010
Incheon	13.30	0.0	2 September 2005
Jinan	13.34	–0.9	25 October 2009
Kawasaki	13.09	+0.2	6 May 2012
Kobe	13.22	–0.8	10 July 2011
Lausanne	12.88; AR	+1.1	11 July 2006
Macau	13.21	–0.9	2 November 2005
Mito, Ibaraki	13.23	+1.3	5 May 2004
Nanjing	13.10	+0.4	20 October 2005
Nanning	13.20	+1.1	18 April 2004
Osaka	12.95	+1.7	31 August 2007
Shanghai	12.97	+0.4	19 May 2012
Shijiazhuang	13.21	0.0	20 June 2005
Tianjin	13.06	–0.8	1 August 2004
Zhongshan	13.23	+1.4	24 April 2005

== See also ==
- China at the 2004 Summer Olympics
- China at the 2008 Summer Olympics
- China at the World Championships in Athletics

Records
Preceded by (United Kingdom) Colin Jackson	Men's 110 m Hurdles World Record Holder; August 27, 2004 – June 12, 2008	Succeeded by (Cuba) Dayron Robles
Sporting positions
Preceded by (United States) Allen Johnson	Men's 110 m Hurdles Best Year Performance; 2004	Succeeded by (France) Ladji Doucouré
Preceded by (France) Ladji Doucouré	Men's 110 m Hurdles Best Year Performance; 2006–2007	Succeeded by (Cuba) Dayron Robles
Olympic Games
Preceded by None	Flagbearer for China at the Olympics closing ceremony Athens 2004	Succeeded by Zhang Ning
