= Mohamed Issa Al-Thawadi =

Qatari hurdler (born 1981)

Personal information
- Nationality: Qatar
- Born: 18 November 1981 (age 45)
- Height: 1.75 m (5 ft 9 in)
- Weight: 75 kg (165 lb)

Sport
- Sport: Athletics
- Event: 110 metres hurdles
- Club: Qatar Sports Club
Medal record
Men's athletics
Representing Qatar
Asian Championships
Silver medal – second place	2007 Amman	110 m hurdles

Mohamed Issa Al-Thawadi (Arabic: محمد عيسى الذوادي; born November 18, 1981) is a Qatari sprint hurdler. Al-Thawadi represented Qatar at the 2008 Summer Olympics in Beijing, where he competed for the men's 110 metres hurdles. He ran in the sixth heat against seven other athletes including defending Olympic champion Liu Xiang of China. While his strongest opponent did not complete the hurdle lap because of a serious injury, Al-Thawadi gladly finished in fifth place with his seasonal best time of 13.64 seconds. Although he ranked below the four mandatory slots, Al-Thawadi qualified for the next phase of the competition based on his time and performance in the heats. For the second round, Al-Thawadi, however, was disqualified from the competition, for being responsible to the second false start of the third heat.
