= Tang Hon Sing =

Hong Kong sprinter

Personal information
- Nationality: Hong Konger
- Born: 7 October 1977 (age 48)
- Education: Beijing Sport University

Chinese name
- Traditional Chinese: 鄧漢昇
- Simplified Chinese: 邓汉升
- Hanyu Pinyin: Dèng Hànshēng
- Yale Romanization: Dahng Honsīng

Sport
- Sport: Sprinting
- Event: 4 × 100 metres relay

Tang Hon Sing (born 7 October 1977) is a Hong Kong former sprinter. He competed in the men's 4 × 100 metres relay at the 2000 Summer Olympics. He graduated from Beijing Sport University. He formerly held the Hong Kong record for the men's 110 metres hurdles and 400 metres hurdles. He later became an athletics coach.
