= 2008 Asian Indoor Athletics Championships – Results =

These are the official results of the 2008 Asian Indoor Athletics Championships, which took place on 14–16 February 2008 in Doha, Qatar.

== Men's results ==
=== 60 meters ===
Heats – 14 February

Rank	Heat	Name	Nationality	Time	Notes
1	1	Samuel Francis	Qatar	6.65	Q
2	1	Leung Chun Wai	Hong Kong	6.83	Q
2	3	Vyacheslav Muravyev	Kazakhstan	6.83	Q
4	3	Muhammad Imran	Pakistan	6.84	Q
5	2	Rinat Galiyev	Kazakhstan	6.86	Q
6	2	Mohamed Farhan	Bahrain	6.86	Q
7	2	Omar Jouma Al-Salfa	United Arab Emirates	6.87	q
7	3	Amir Payaho	Iran	6.87	q
9	2	Yasir Alnashri	Saudi Arabia	6.89	
10	1	Khalil Al-Hanahneh	Jordan	6.92	
11	1	Liu Yuan Kai	Chinese Taipei	6.95	
12	1	Barakat Al-Harthi	Oman	6.97	
13	1	Humoud Al-Ahmed	Kuwait	7.00	
13	3	Poh Seng Song	Singapore	7.00	
15	2	Fadlin Fadlin	Indonesia	7.05	
16	3	Mohammed al-Dosari	Qatar	7.07	
17	1	Anton Dwi Cahyo	Indonesia	7.09	
17	2	Tang Yik Chun	Hong Kong	7.09	
19	3	Aleksandr Balataev	Tajikistan	7.24	
20	2	Ali Shareef	Maldives	7.34	
21	3	Alounsana Souvanhnalath	Laos	7.47	
	2	Mohamad Siraj Tamim	Lebanon	DNS	
	3	Mohamed Al-Rashedi	Bahrain	DNS	

Final – 14 February

Rank	Name	Nationality	Time	Notes
1st place, gold medalist(s)	Samuel Francis	Qatar	6.62	CR
2nd place, silver medalist(s)	Leung Chun Wai	Hong Kong	6.79	
3rd place, bronze medalist(s)	Vyacheslav Muravyev	Kazakhstan	6.79	
4	Omar Jouma Al-Salfa	United Arab Emirates	6.81	
5	Muhammad Imran	Pakistan	6.82	
6	Mohamed Farhan	Bahrain	6.84	
7	Amir Payaho	Iran	6.85	
8	Rinat Galiyev	Kazakhstan	6.87	

=== 400 meters ===
Heats – 14 February

Rank	Heat	Name	Nationality	Time	Notes
1	2	Liu Xiaosheng	China	48.03	Q
2	1	Sergej Zaikov	Kazakhstan	48.61	Q
3	1	Jukkatip Pojaroen	Thailand	48.77	Q
4	2	Ali Shirook	United Arab Emirates	48.84	Q
5	1	Yonas Al-Hosah	Saudi Arabia	49.19	q
6	1	Mohd Zainal Abidin Zaiful	Malaysia	49.??	q
7	1	Aleksey Pogorelov	Kyrgyzstan	49.37	
8	2	Ahmed Nasser Al-Wahaibi	Oman	49.49	
9	2	Leung Ki Ho	Hong Kong	49.76	NR
10	2	Mohamed Sagayroon	Qatar	50.59	
11	2	Ali Hazer	Lebanon	50.72	
12	2	Amer Jasim	Iraq	52.24	

Final – 15 February

Rank	Name	Nationality	Time	Notes
1st place, gold medalist(s)	Liu Xiaosheng	China	47.82	CR
2nd place, silver medalist(s)	Sergej Zaikov	Kazakhstan	48.12	
3rd place, bronze medalist(s)	Ali Shirook	United Arab Emirates	48.24	NR
4	Mohd Zainal Abidin Zaiful	Malaysia	48.43	NR
5	Yonas Al-Hosah	Saudi Arabia	48.97	
6	Jukkatip Pojaroen	Thailand	50.05	

=== 800 meters ===
Heats – 14 February

Rank	Heat	Name	Nationality	Time	Notes
1	3	Li Xiangyu	China	1:54.31	Q
2	3	Adam Ali	Qatar	1:54.84	Q
3	3	Masato Yokota	Japan	1:55.21	Q
4	1	Yusuf Saad Kamel	Bahrain	1:55.35	Q
5	1	Sajeesh Joseph	India	1:55.41	Q
6	1	Abubaker Ali Kamal	Qatar	1:55.46	Q
7	1	Amir Moradi	Iran	1:56.17	q
8	2	Ehsan Mohajer Shojaei	Iran	1:56.80	Q
9	2	Rajeev Ramesan	India	1:57.46	Q
10	1	Firdavs Azizov	Tajikistan	1:57.71	q
11	2	Musaab Bella	Qatar	1:57.46	Q
12	2	Mamoun Ballo	Palestine	2:05.34	q
	2	Bashar Al-Kufraini	Jordan	DNS	
	3	Kaharuddin Kaharuddin	Indonesia	DNS	
	3	Domingos da Silva	Timor-Leste	DNS	

Semi-finals – 15 February

Rank	Heat	Name	Nationality	Time	Notes
1	1	Yusuf Saad Kamel	Bahrain	1:50.36	Q
2	1	Sajeesh Joseph	India	1:50.78	Q
3	1	Abubaker Ali Kamal	Qatar	1:51.09	Q
4	1	Musaab Bella	Qatar	1:51.93	
5	1	Amir Moradi	Iran	1:51.98	
6	2	Ehsan Mohajer Shojaei	Iran	1:52.75	Q
7	2	Rajeev Ramesan	India	1:52.98	Q
8	2	Masato Yokota	Japan	1:53.10	Q
9	2	Adam Ali	Qatar	1:53.29	
10	2	Li Xiangyu	China	1:54.11	
11	2	Firdavs Azizov	Tajikistan	1:56.89	
12	1	Mamoun Ballo	Palestine	2:05.53	

Final – 16 February

Rank	Name	Nationality	Time	Notes
1st place, gold medalist(s)	Yusuf Saad Kamel	Bahrain	1:48.03	=CR
2nd place, silver medalist(s)	Ehsan Mohajer Shojaei	Iran	1:48.68	
3rd place, bronze medalist(s)	Masato Yokota	Japan	1:49.30	
4	Rajeev Ramesan	India	1:49.46	NR
5	Abubaker Ali Kamal	Qatar	1:49.86	
6	Sajeesh Joseph	India	1:50.10	

=== 1500 meters ===
15 February

Rank	Name	Nationality	Time	Notes
1st place, gold medalist(s)	Thamer Kamal Ali	Qatar	3:40.86	CR
2nd place, silver medalist(s)	Hamza Chatholi	India	3:41.18	NR
3rd place, bronze medalist(s)	Abubaker Ali Kamal	Qatar	3:42.50	
4	Fumikazu Kobayashi	Japan	3:49.77	
5	Daham Najim Bashir	Qatar	3:50.65	
6	Sergey Pakura	Kyrgyzstan	3:57.63	

=== 3000 meters ===
16 February

Rank	Name	Nationality	Time	Notes
1st place, gold medalist(s)	Sultan Khamis Zaman	Qatar	7:49.31	
2nd place, silver medalist(s)	Surenda Singh	India	7:49.47	NR
3rd place, bronze medalist(s)	James Kwalia	Qatar	7:50.76	
4	Felix Kibore	Qatar	7:52.20	
5	Sandip Kumar	India	8:01.28	
	Fumikazu Kobayashi	Japan	DNS	
	Nader Al-Massri	Palestine	DNS	

=== 60 meters hurdles ===
Heats – 15 February

Rank	Heat	Name	Nationality	Time	Notes
1	1	Ji Wei	China	7.93	Q
2	2	Rayzam Shah Wan Sofian	Malaysia	7.96	Q
3	2	Fawaz Al-Shammari	Kuwait	8.02	Q
4	2	Muhammad Sajjad	Pakistan	8.07	Q
5	2	Ahmad Al-Molad	Saudi Arabia	8.07	q
6	1	Nazar Mukhametzhan	Kazakhstan	8.10	Q
7	1	Sami Ahmed Al-Yamdar	Saudi Arabia	8.13	Q
8	1	Abdul Rashid	Pakistan	8.18	q
9	1	Hussein Al-Youha	Kuwait	8.31	
10	1	Lo Ngai Fung	Hong Kong	8.60	
11	2	Javandri Cristhe Ayawaila	Indonesia	9.04	
12	2	Bazar Nawaz Al-Setar	Bahrain	10.22	NR

Final – 15 February

Rank	Name	Nationality	Time	Notes
1st place, gold medalist(s)	Ji Wei	China	7.79	CR
2nd place, silver medalist(s)	Abdul Rashid	Pakistan	7.98	
3rd place, bronze medalist(s)	Muhammad Sajjad	Pakistan	8.01	
4	Rayzam Shah Wan Sofian	Malaysia	8.01	
5	Sami Ahmed Al-Yamdar	Saudi Arabia	8.05	
6	Ahmad Al-Molad	Saudi Arabia	8.05	
7	Nazar Mukhametzhan	Kazakhstan	8.06	
8	Fawaz Al-Shammari	Kuwait	8.07	

=== 4 x 400 meters relay ===
16 February

Rank	Nation	Athletes	Time	Notes
1st place, gold medalist(s)	Saudi Arabia	Yonas Al-Hosah, Ali Al-Deraan, Ismail Al-Sabani, Edrees Hawsawi	3:14.25	CR
2nd place, silver medalist(s)	India	V. B. Bineesh, Gurvinder Pal Singh, Virender Kumar Pankaj, Thannickkal Aboobcker	3:16.53	
3rd place, bronze medalist(s)	Qatar	Mohamed Sagayroon, Adam Ali, Musaab Bella, Azmy Sulaiman	3:17.93	NR

=== High jump ===
14 February

Rank	Name	Nationality	Result	Notes
1st place, gold medalist(s)	Sergey Zasimovich	Kazakhstan	2.24	CR
2nd place, silver medalist(s)	Majed Aldin Ghazal	Syria	2.21	
3rd place, bronze medalist(s)	Rashid Ahmed Al-Mannai	Qatar	2.18	
4	Jean-Claude Rabbath	Lebanon	2.18	
5	Wang Chen	China	2.18	
6	Naoyuki Daigo	Japan	2.14	
7	Salem Al-Enezi	Kuwait	2.10	
8	Salem Nasser Bakheet	Bahrain	2.05	
9	Satoru Kubota	Japan	2.05	
10	Jamal Fakhri Al-Qasim	Saudi Arabia	2.05	
10	Hashem Iqeebi	Japan	2.05	
12	Tsao Chih Hao	Chinese Taipei	2.00	
	Salman Al-Mannai	Qatar	NM	
	Hari Shanker Roy	India	NM	
	Benedict Stanley	India	DNS	
	Amin Hossein Zadeh Rahbar	Iran	DNS	

=== Pole vault ===
15 February

Rank	Name	Nationality	Result	Notes
1st place, gold medalist(s)	Daichi Sawano	Japan	5.45	
2nd place, silver medalist(s)	Takafumi Suzuki	Japan	5.35	
3rd place, bronze medalist(s)	Leonid Andreev	Uzbekistan	5.35	
4	Mohsen Rabbani	Iran	4.90	
5	Ali Al-Sabaghah	Kuwait	4.90	
	Daej Al-Saqai	Saudi Arabia	NM	
	Thaher Al-Zboon	Jordan	DNS	

=== Long jump ===
16 February

Rank	Name	Nationality	Result	Notes
1st place, gold medalist(s)	Mohammed Al-Khuwalidi	Saudi Arabia	8.24	CR, AR
2nd place, silver medalist(s)	Saleh Al-Haddad	Kuwait	7.88	NR
3rd place, bronze medalist(s)	Hussein Taher Al-Sabee	Saudi Arabia	7.72	
4	Yohei Sugai	Japan	7.70	
5	Konstantin Safronov	Kazakhstan	7.56	
6	Su Xiongfeng	China	7.56	
7	Gao Hongwei	China	7.52	
8	Chao Chih-chien	Chinese Taipei	7.24	
9	Mohamed Yusuf Salman	Bahrain	7.17	
10	Ahmad Fayyaz	Pakistan	7.05	
11	Keeratikorn Janmanee	Thailand	7.03	
12	Khalil Al-Hanahneh	Jordan	6.96	
13	Wang Kan Kenneth	Singapore	6.95	
14	Ali Al-Rashdi	Oman	6.94	
15	Krishna Kumar Rane	India	6.88	
16	Soulisack Silisavadymao	Laos	6.17	
	Shiv Shankar Yadav	India	DNS	

=== Triple jump ===
15 February

Rank	Name	Nationality	Result	Notes
1st place, gold medalist(s)	Roman Valiyev	Kazakhstan	16.32	
2nd place, silver medalist(s)	Amarjeet Singh	India	16.24	NR
3rd place, bronze medalist(s)	Theerayut Philakong	Thailand	16.04	NR
4	Wu Bo	China	16.04	
5	Yevgeniy Ektov	Kazakhstan	15.98	
6	Mohamed Yusuf Salman	Bahrain	15.78	NR
7	Jamal Fakhri Al-Qasim	Saudi Arabia	15.10	

=== Shot put ===
16 February

Rank	Name	Nationality	Result	Notes
1st place, gold medalist(s)	Ahmad Gholoum	Kuwait	18.55	CR
2nd place, silver medalist(s)	Om Prakash Karhana	India	18.37	
3rd place, bronze medalist(s)	Yao Yongguang	China	18.16	
4	Grigoriy Kamulya	Uzbekistan	17.84	
5	Satyender Kumar Singh	India	17.62	
6	Mashari Mohammad	Kuwait	17.61	
7	Mohamad Amine	Qatar	16.62	
8	Rashid Al-Emeqbali	United Arab Emirates	16.45	

=== Heptathlon ===
15–16 February

The highest mark recorded in each event is highlighted in yellow

Rank	Athlete	Nationality	60m	LJ	SP	HJ	60m H	PV	1000m	Points	Notes
1st place, gold medalist(s)	P. J. Vinod	India	7.02	7.23	13.64	1.93	8.32	4.40	2:52.74	5561	=NR
2nd place, silver medalist(s)	Hadi Sepehrzad	Iran	7.06	6.97	16.03	1.93	8.27	4.00	2:54.20	5515	NR
3rd place, bronze medalist(s)	Hiromasa Tanaka	Japan	7.13	6.64	12.23	1.87	8.56	4.60	2:47.00	5306	
4	Vitaliy Smirnov	Uzbekistan	7.32	6.49	14.12	1.87	8.74	4.50	2:43.87	5085	
5	Ram Niwas	India	7.49	6.41	11.66	1.81	8.82	3.50	2:54.98	4597	
	Pavel Dubitskiy	Kazakhstan	7.13	6.88	12.93	2.05	8.25	NM	DNS	DNF	

== Women's results ==
=== 60 meters ===
Heats – 14 February

Rank	Heat	Name	Nationality	Time	Notes
1	1	Roqaya Al-Gassra	Bahrain	7.46	Q
2	2	Nongnuch Sanrat	Thailand	7.52	Q
3	1	Wang Yingju	China	7.54	Q
4	1	Sangwan Jaksunin	Thailand	7.57	Q
5	2	Anastassiya Soprunova	Kazakhstan	7.69	Q
6	2	Faten Abdulnabi Mahdi	Bahrain	7.70	Q
7	1	Wan Kin Yee	Hong Kong	7.78	q
8	2	Chan Ho Yee	Hong Kong	7.80	q
9	1	Iyleen Samantha Anthony	India	7.92	
10	2	Dana Hussain Abdul-Razak	Iraq	7.98	
11	1	Cheong Im Wa	Macau	7.99	
12	1	Munira Saleh	Syria	8.29	
13	2	Jauna Abdulla Nafiz	Maldives	8.30	NR
14	2	Dana Garib	Qatar	8.74	

Final – 14 February

Rank	Name	Nationality	Time	Notes
1st place, gold medalist(s)	Roqaya Al-Gassra	Bahrain	7.40	CR, NR
2nd place, silver medalist(s)	Wang Yingju	China	7.47	
3rd place, bronze medalist(s)	Nongnuch Sanrat	Thailand	7.49	
4	Sangwan Jaksunin	Thailand	7.64	
5	Wan Kin Yee	Hong Kong	7.71	
6	Faten Abdulnabi Mahdi	Bahrain	7.73	
7	Chan Ho Yee	Hong Kong	7.73	
8	Anastassiya Soprunova	Kazakhstan	7.77	

=== 400 meters ===
Heats – 14 February

Rank	Heat	Name	Nationality	Time	Notes
1	1	Roqaya Al-Gassra	Bahrain	54.12	Q
2	2	Marina Maslenko	Kazakhstan	55.04	Q
3	2	Mandeep Kaur	India	55.41	Q
4	1	Anna Gavriushenko	Kazakhstan	55.53	Q
5	2	Manjeet Kaur	India	57.30	q
6	1	Galina Pedan	Kyrgyzstan	58.10	q
7	2	Olga Gerasimova	Tajikistan	1:02.49	

Final – 15 February

Rank	Name	Nationality	Time	Notes
1st place, gold medalist(s)	Roqaya Al-Gassra	Bahrain	53.28	CR, NR
2nd place, silver medalist(s)	Marina Maslenko	Kazakhstan	53.38	
3rd place, bronze medalist(s)	Mandeep Kaur	India	54.28	
4	Anna Gavriushenko	Kazakhstan	54.87	
5	Manjeet Kaur	India	56.20	
6	Galina Pedan	Kyrgyzstan	57.02	

=== 800 meters ===
16 February

Rank	Name	Nationality	Time	Notes
1st place, gold medalist(s)	Sinimol Paulose	India	2:03.43	CR, NR
2nd place, silver medalist(s)	Sushma Devi	India	2:04.66	
3rd place, bronze medalist(s)	Margarita Matsko	Kazakhstan	2:04.85	
4	Ayako Jinnouchi	Japan	2:05.66	
5	Viktoriya Yalovtseva	Kazakhstan	2:06.00	
6	Liu Qing	China	2:07.26	

=== 1500 meters ===
14 February

Rank	Name	Nationality	Time	Notes
1st place, gold medalist(s)	Sinimol Paulose	India	4:15.42	CR, NR
2nd place, silver medalist(s)	Sushma Devi	India	4:21.78	
3rd place, bronze medalist(s)	Sara Bakheet	Bahrain	4:26.70	
4	Angham Jabbar	Iraq	4:43.31	

=== 3000 meters ===
15 February

Rank	Name	Nationality	Time	Notes
1st place, gold medalist(s)	Preeja Sreedharan	India	9:12.26	CR, NR
2nd place, silver medalist(s)	Kavita Raut	India	9:26.01	
3rd place, bronze medalist(s)	Sara Bakheet	Bahrain	9:40.47	
	Angham Jabbar	Iraq	DNS	
	Bara'ah Awadalla	Jordan	DNS	

=== 60 meters hurdles ===
15 February

Rank	Name	Nationality	Time	Notes
1st place, gold medalist(s)	Liu Jing	China	8.31	CR
2nd place, silver medalist(s)	Anastasiya Soprunova	Kazakhstan	8.34	
3rd place, bronze medalist(s)	Leelavathi Veerappan	India	9.21	

=== 4 x 400 meters relay ===
16 February

Rank	Nation	Athletes	Time	Notes
1st place, gold medalist(s)	India	Mandeep Kaur, Manjeet Kaur, Sini Jose, Chitra K. Soman	3:37.36	CR, AR
2nd place, silver medalist(s)	Kazakhstan	Tatyana Azarova, Marina Maslenko, Viktoriya Yalovtseva, Anna Gavriushenko	3:38.10	
3rd place, bronze medalist(s)	Thailand	Jutamass Tawoncharoen, Saowalee Kaewchuay, Kunya Harnthong, Treewadee Yongphan	3:43.22	

=== High jump ===
16 February

Rank	Name	Nationality	Result	Notes
1st place, gold medalist(s)	Tatyana Efimenko	Kyrgyzstan	1.91	
2nd place, silver medalist(s)	Anna Ustinova	Kazakhstan	1.91	
3rd place, bronze medalist(s)	Yekaterina Yevseyeva	Kazakhstan	1.88	
4	Sahana Kumari	India	1.80	
5	Zhao Wei	China	1.80	

=== Pole vault ===
14 February

Rank	Name	Nationality	Result	Notes
1st place, gold medalist(s)	Ikuko Nishikori	Japan	4.10	
2nd place, silver medalist(s)	Roslinda Samsu	Malaysia	4.10	
3rd place, bronze medalist(s)	Takayo Kondo	Japan	4.10	
	Yang Rachel	Singapore	NM	

=== Long jump ===
14 February

Rank	Name	Nationality	Result	Notes
1st place, gold medalist(s)	Chen Yaling	China	6.39	
2nd place, silver medalist(s)	Anju Bobby George	India	6.38	
3rd place, bronze medalist(s)	M. A. Prajusha	India	6.09	
4	Fadwa Al-Bouza	Syria	5.56	
5	Amina Al-Malki	Qatar	3.60	

=== Triple jump ===
14 February

Rank	Name	Nationality	Result	Notes
1st place, gold medalist(s)	Olga Rypakova	Kazakhstan	14.23	CR
2nd place, silver medalist(s)	Li Qian	China	13.76	
3rd place, bronze medalist(s)	Liu Yanan	China	13.39	
4	Yelena Parfenova	Kazakhstan	13.30	
5	Thitima Muangjan	Thailand	12.98	
6	Fadwa Al-Bouza	Syria	12.14	
7	Kulwinder Kaur	India	11.32	

=== Shot put ===
14 February

Rank	Name	Nationality	Result	Notes
1st place, gold medalist(s)	Gong Lijiao	China	18.12	CR
2nd place, silver medalist(s)	Iolanta Ulyeva	Kazakhstan	15.99	
3rd place, bronze medalist(s)	Juttaporn Krasaeyan	Thailand	14.73	
4	Zeenat Parveen	Pakistan	13.03	
5	Asma Khalifa Bouali	Bahrain	9.65	NR
6	Maryam Johar	Qatar	9.41	
6	Amina Al-Mannai	Qatar	7.42	

=== Pentathlon ===
14 February

The highest mark recorded in each event is highlighted in yellow

Rank	Athlete	Nationality	60m H	HJ	SP	LJ	800m	Points	Notes
1st place, gold medalist(s)	Irina Naumenko	Kazakhstan	8.5	1.70	13.30	6.06	2:21.77	4235	
2nd place, silver medalist(s)	Wassana Winatho	Thailand	8.2	1.76	10.72	6.05	2:22.96	4184	NR
3rd place, bronze medalist(s)	Olga Lapina	Kazakhstan	9.1	1.76	13.59	5.71	2:36.92	3906	
4	Javur Jagadeeshappa Shobha	India	8.5	1.55	12.74	5.98	2:32.32	3860	NR
5	Leelavathi Veerappan	India	8.9	1.49	9.79	5.45	2:25.20	3447	
6	Rania Al-Qabali	Jordan	9.8	1.43	NM	4.68	2:29.23	2426	NR
