= List of Asian Indoor Athletics Championships records =

The Asian Indoor Athletics Championships is a biennial event which began in 2004. Asian Athletics Association accepts only athletes who are representing one of the organisation's Asian member states and the body recognises records set at editions of the Asian Indoor Athletics Championships.

== Men ==
Event	Record	Athlete	Nation	Date	Edition	Place	Ref.
60 m	6.50 NR	Ali Anwar Al-Balushi	Oman	18 February 2024	2024	Tehran, Iran	
400 m	45.88	Abdelalelah Haroun	Qatar	20 February 2016	2016	Doha, Qatar	
800 m	1:46.80 NR	Ebrahim Al-Zofairi	Kuwait	19 February 2024	2024	Tehran, Iran	
1500 m	3:36.35 NR	Mohamed Al-Garni	Qatar	20 February 2016	2016	Doha, Qatar	
3000 m	7:39.23	Mohamed Al-Garni	Qatar	21 February 2016	2016	Doha, Qatar	
60 m hurdles	7.53	Liu Junxi	China	7 February 2026	2026	Tianjin, China	
High jump	2.38 m	Mutaz Essa Barshim	Qatar	1 February 2018	2018	Tehran, Iran	
Pole vault	5.75 m	Huang Bokai	China	20 February 2016	2016	Doha, Qatar	
Long jump	8.24 m	Mohamed Salman Al-Khuwalidi	Saudi Arabia	16 February 2008	2008	Doha, Qatar	
Triple jump	17.20 m	Fang Yaoqing	China	10 February 2023	2023	Astana, Kazakhstan	
Shot put	20.07 m	Chen Chengyu	China	8 February 2026	2026	Tianjin, China	
Heptathlon	5993 pts NR	Tejaswin Shankar	India	7–8 February 2026	2026	Tianjin, China	
Heptathlon	60m / Long jump / Shot put / High jump / 60m H / Pole vault / 1000m; 7.11 / 7.53 m / 13.63 m / 2.23 m / 8.02 / 4.20 m / 2:43.91						
4 × 400 m relay	3:08.20	Mohammad Nasser Abbas; Abdulrahman Musaeb Balla; Abubaker Haydar Abdalla; Abdalelah Haroun	Qatar	21 February 2016	2016	Doha, Qatar	

== Women ==
Event	Record	Athlete	Nation	Date	Edition	Place	Ref.
60 m	7.20	Liang Xiaojing	China	2 February 2018	2018	Tehran, Iran	
60 m	7.20 NR	Farzaneh Fasihi	Iran	18 February 2024	2024	Tehran, Iran	
400 m	51.67	Kemi Adekoya	Bahrain	20 February 2016	2016	Doha, Qatar	
800 m	2:03.43	Sinimol Paulose	India	16 February 2008	2008	Doha, Qatar	
1500 m	4:15.42	Sinimol Paulose	India	14 February 2008	2008	Doha, Qatar	
3000 m	8:43.16 NR	Maryam Yusuf Jamal	Bahrain	16 February 2014	2014	Hangzhou, China	
60 m hurdles	8.01	Masumi Aoki	Japan	12 February 2023	2023	Astana, Kazakhstan	
High jump	1.96 m	Svetlana Radzivil	Uzbekistan	16 February 2014	2014	Hangzhou, China	
Pole vault	4.70 m AR	Li Ling	China	19 February 2016	2016	Doha, Qatar	
Long jump	6.64 m	Sumire Hata	Japan	12 February 2023	2023	Astana, Kazakhstan	
Triple jump	14.32 m	Olga Rypakova	Kazakhstan	20 February 2016	2016	Doha, Qatar	
Shot put	18.37 m	Liu Xiangrong	China	18 February 2012	2012	Hangzhou, China	
Pentathlon	4582 pts AR	Olga Rypakova	Kazakhstan	10 February 2006	2006	Pattaya, Thailand	
Pentathlon	60m H / High jump / Shot put / Long jump / 800m; 8.68 / 1.88 m / 12.90 m / 6.55 m / 2:23.26						
4 × 400 m relay	3:35.07 AR	Alwa Eid Naserand; Uwaseun Yusuf Jamal; Iman Essa Jasim; Kemi Adekoya	Bahrain	21 February 2016	2016	Doha, Qatar	

== Records in defunct events ==
=== Men's events ===
Event	Record	Athlete	Nation	Date	Meet	Place	Ref.
200 m	21.56	Tomoyuki Arai	Japan	7 February 2004	2004	Tehran, Iran	
5000 m walk	22:12.27	Amir Kheirgoo	Iran	8 February 2004	2004	Tehran, Iran	

=== Women's events ===
Event	Record	Athlete	Nation	Date	Meet	Place	Ref.
200 m	23.91	Xie Rong	China	7 February 2004	2004	Tehran, Iran	
3000 m walk	14:54.15	Jasmin Kaur	India	6 February 2004	2004	Tehran, Iran	
