= Track and field at the 2011 Military World Games – Men's 110 metres hurdles =

The men's 110 metres hurdles event at the 2011 Military World Games was held on 20 and 21 July at the Estádio Olímpico João Havelange.

== Records ==
Prior to this competition, the existing world and CISM record were as follows:

World Record	Dayron Robles (CUB)	12.87	Ostrava, Czech Republic	12 June 2008
CISM World Record	Staņislavs Olijars (LAT)	13.32	Zagreb, Croatia	August 1999

== Schedule ==
Date	Time	Round
20 July 2011	09:00	Semifinals
21 July 2011	09:10	Final

== Medalists ==
Gold	Silver	Bronze
Dominik Bochenek; Poland	Ji Wei; China	Mariusz Kubaszewski; Poland

== Results ==
=== Final ===
Wind: 0.0 m/s

Rank	Lane	Name	Nationality	Time	Notes
1st place, gold medalist(s)	6	Dominik Bochenek	Poland	13.74	
2nd place, silver medalist(s)	3	Ji Wei	China	13.81	
3rd place, bronze medalist(s)	4	Mariusz Kubaszewski	Poland	13.87	
4	7	Damien Broothaerts	Belgium	13.93	
5	8	Ali Alzaki	Saudi Arabia	13.98	
6	5	Ahmed Almuwallad	Saudi Arabia	14.02	
7	2	Fawaz Al-Shammari	Kuwait	14.02	
8	1	Zhu Hengjun	China	14.30	
