= Zhang Xiaoyu (shot putter) =

Chinese shot putter

Medal record

Women's athletics

Representing China

Asian Indoor Championships
Gold medal – first place	2004 Tehran	Shot put

Zhang Xiaoyu (Chinese: 张小雨; pinyin: Zhāng Xiǎoyǔ; born March 16, 1983, in Beijing) is a female shot putter from PR China. She won the event at the 2004 Asian Indoor Athletics Championships, which were first held that year. She finished 20th in the Women's shot put at the 2004 Olympics.

== Achievements ==
Year	Competition	Venue	Position	Notes
Representing China
2003	World Championships	Paris, France	21st (q)	16.82 m
2004	Asian Indoor Championships	Tehran, Iran	1st	17.38 m
2004	Olympic Games	Athens, Greece	20th (q)	17.22 m
