= 2012 Asian Indoor Athletics Championships =

2012 Asian Indoor Championships
- Dates: 18–19 February
- Host city: Hangzhou, China
- Events: 25
- Participation: 195 athletes from 26 nations

The 2012 Asian Indoor Athletics Championships was the fifth edition of the international indoor athletics event between Asian nations. It took place at the Vocational and Technical College Athletics Hall in Hangzhou, China, between 18 and 19 February. A total of 26 nations sent athletes to compete at the championships, which featured 25 track and field events.

China topped the medal table with 14 golds. Iran was second with three golds while Bahrain finished third with three golds.

The competition featured two Asian indoor records. Mutaz Essa Barshim broke the men's high jump record with a clearance of 2.37 m, bettering Zhu Jianhua's 26-year-ol standard. Li Ling beat the women's Asian indoor record in the pole vault with a mark of 4.50 m.

== Results ==
=== Men ===
Event	Gold		Silver		Bronze	
60 m	Reza Ghasemi; Iran	6.68	Lai Chun Ho; Hong Kong	6.78	Hassan Heidarpour; Iran	6.78
400 m	Reza Bouazar; Iran	48.09	Chang Pengben; China	48.47	Amin Ghelichi; Iran	48.64
800 m	Mohammad Al-Azemi; Kuwait	1:47.37 CR NR	Adnan Taes; Iraq	1:49.42 NR	Yang Xiaofei; China	1:50.32
1500 m	Mohammed Shaween; Saudi Arabia	3:57.84 NR	Mohamed Al-Garni; Qatar	3:58.04	Omar Al-Rasheedi; Kuwait	3:59.83
3000 m	Bilisuma Shugi; Bahrain	7:43.88	Mohamed Al-Garni; Qatar	7:46.17	Alemu Bekele; Bahrain	7:48.04
60 m hurdles	Jiang Fan; China	7.74 CR	Abdulaziz Al-Mandeel; Kuwait	7.82 NR	Ji Wei; China	7.85
4 × 400 m relay	Event cancelled due to lack of entries					
High jump	Mutaz Essa Barshim; Qatar	2.37 m AR	Zhang Guowei; China	2.28 m	Majed Al-Din Ghazal; Syria	2.24 m
Pole vault	Yang Yansheng; China	5.50 m	Zhang Wei; China	5.40 m	Junya Nagata; Japan	5.30 m
Long jump	Li Jinzhe; China	7.98 m	Rikiya Saruyama; Japan	7.63 m	Kumaravel Premkumar; India	7.62 m
Triple jump	Dong Bin; China	17.01 m CR	Cao Shuo; China	17.01 m CR	Li Yanxi; China	16.23
Shot put	Zhang Jun; China	19.78 m CR	Wang Guangfu; China	19.40 m	Wang Like; China	19.09 m
Heptathlon	Dmitriy Karpov; Kazakhstan	5928 pts CR	Keisuke Ushiro; Japan	5590 pts	Hiromasa Tanaka; Japan	5033 pts
WR world record | AR area record | CR championship record | GR games record | NR national record | OR Olympic record | PB personal best | SB season best | WL world leading (in a given season)

=== Women ===
Event	Gold		Silver		Bronze	
60 m	Wei Yongli; China	7.37	Tao Yujia; China	7.40	Viktoriya Zyabkina; Kazakhstan	7.44
400 m	Maryam Tousi; Iran	53.85 NR	Chen Jingwen; China	54.17	Tang Xiaoyin; China	55.06
800 m	Zhao Jing; China	2:04.15	Genzeb Shumi; Bahrain	2:05.96	Song Tingting; China	2:11.32
1500 m	Genzeb Shumi; Bahrain	4:15.85	Betlhem Belayneh; United Arab Emirates	4:16.97 NR	Liu Fang; China	4:18.32
3000 m	Shitaye Eshete; Bahrain	8:49.27 CR NR	Betlhem Belayneh; United Arab Emirates	8:53.56 NR	Tejitu Daba; Bahrain	8:53.75
60 m hurdles	Wu Shuijiao; China	8.24 CR	Natalya Ivoninskaya; Kazakhstan	8.29	Sun Yawei; China	8.35
4 × 400 m relay	China; Chen Yanmei; Tang Xiaoyin; Cheng Chong; Chen Jingwen	3:40.34	Kazakhstan; Natalya Tukova; Yekaterina Yermak; Margarita Kudinova; Alexandra Kuzina	3:44.85	Kyrgyzstan; Olesia Korovina; Anna Bulanova; Ksenia Kadkina; Iuliia Khodykina	3:56.11 NR
High jump	Zheng Xingjuan; China	1.92 m	Wang Yang; China	1.88 m	Duong Thi Viet Anh; Vietnam	1.84 m
Pole vault	Li Ling; China	4.50 m AR	Choi Yun-Hee; South Korea	4.30 m	Megumi Nakada; Japan	4.15 m
Long jump	Lu Minjia; China	6.33 m	Anastassiya Kudinova; Kazakhstan	6.23 m	Wang Wupin; China	6.22 m
Triple jump	Xie Limei; China	14.06 m	Li Yanmei; China	13.73 m	Lyudmila Grankovskaya; Kazakhstan	13.22 m
Shot put	Liu Xiangrong; China	18.37 m CR	Leila Rajabi; Iran	17.51 m	Meng Qianqian; China	16.13 m
Pentathlon	Irina Karpova; Kazakhstan	4050 pts	Duong Thi Viet Anh; Vietnam	3812 pts	Sepideh Tavakkoli; Iran	3775 pts
WR world record | AR area record | CR championship record | GR games record | NR national record | OR Olympic record | PB personal best | SB season best | WL world leading (in a given season)

== Medal table ==
Rank	Nation	Gold	Silver	Bronze	Total
1	China (CHN)	14	9	10	33
2	Iran (IRI)	3	1	3	7
3	Bahrain (BHR)	3	1	2	6
4	Kazakhstan (KAZ)	2	3	2	7
5	Qatar (QAT)	1	2	0	3
6	Kuwait (KUW)	1	1	1	3
7	Saudi Arabia (KSA)	1	0	0	1
8	Japan (JPN)	0	2	3	5
9	United Arab Emirates (UAE)	0	2	0	2
10	Vietnam (VIE)	0	1	1	2
11	Hong Kong (HKG)	0	1	0	1
11	Iraq (IRQ)	0	1	0	1
11	South Korea (KOR)	0	1	0	1
14	India (IND)	0	0	1	1
14	Kyrgyzstan (KGZ)	0	0	1	1
14	Syria	0	0	1	1
Totals (16 entries)		25	25	25	75

== Participating nations ==
A total of 26 nations were represented by athletes competing at the 2012 championships

- Bahrain (6)
- China (63)
- Chinese Taipei (7)
- Hong Kong (7)
- India (14)
- Indonesia (3)
- Iran (13)
- Iraq (1)
- Japan (10)
- Kazakhstan (15)
- Kuwait (8)
- Kyrgyzstan (7)
- Laos (2)
- Macau (6)
- Mongolia (7)
- Pakistan (2)
- Philippines (1)
- Qatar (3)
- Saudi Arabia (1)
- Singapore (4)
- South Korea (2)
- Syria (1)
- Thailand (2)
- Turkmenistan (5)
- United Arab Emirates (2)
- Vietnam (3)
