= Kumaravel Premkumar =

Indian long jumper

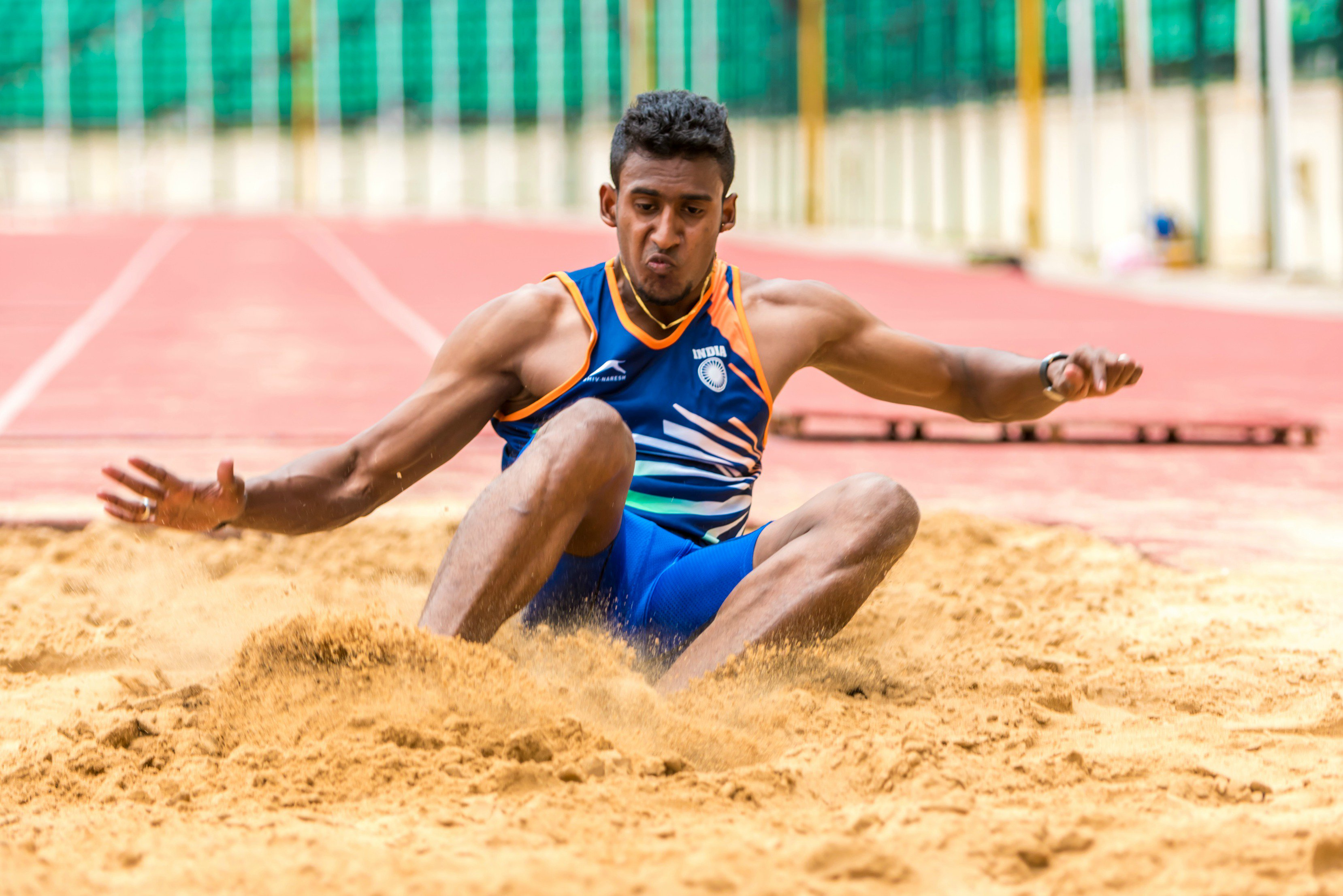

Personal information
- Nationality: Indian
- Born: 6 February 1993 (age 33) Thanjavur, Tamil Nadu
- Spouse: Neelofar

Sport
- Country: India
- Sport: Track & Field
- Event: Long jump
- Club: St. Joseph's Sports Academy
- Coached by: Jamie Nieto

Achievements and titles
- Personal bests: Long jump (outdoor): 8.09 (New Delhi 2013); Long jump (indoor): 7.92 (Doha 2016)
Medal record
Men's athletics
Representing India
Asian Athletics Championships
Silver medal – second place	2013 Pune	Long jump
Bronze medal – third place	2012 Colombo	Long jump
Asian Indoor Athletics Championships
Bronze medal – third place	2012 Hangzhou	Long jump
Silver medal – second place	2016 Doha	Long jump
South Asian Athletics Championships
Silver medal – second place	2016 Guwathti	Long jump

Kumaravel Premkumar (born 2 June 1993) is an Indian long jumper from Tamil Nadu. He is the national record-holder in both the indoor and outdoor long jump. He won a bronze medal at the 2012 Asian Indoor Athletics Championships and a silver at the 2013 Asian Athletics Championships.

== Early life and education ==
Premkumar was born on 6 February 1993 in Kumbakonam, Thanjavur, Tamil Nadu. He was one year old when his father died, after which he was raised by his mother, Uma Rani. His mother worked in a local church to provide for the family. He attended St. Antony's School, Thanjavur where physical education teacher Suresh recognised Premkumar's potential and encouraged him to pursue athletics. As a teenager in 2010, Premkumar moved to Chennai to train under coach P. Nagarajan. He joined Pachaiyappa's College Higher Secondary School, and was coached by Nagarajan at the Prime Sports Academy. He passed Higher Secondary Examination in 2012.

== Sporting career ==
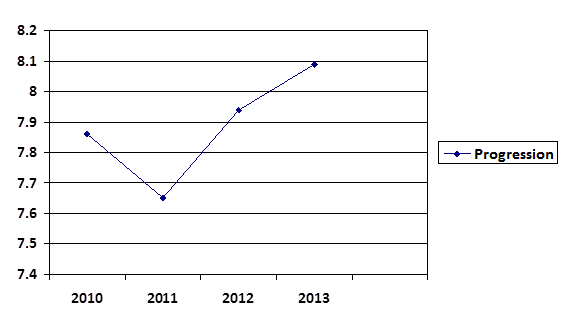
Premkumar's seasons' best distances (in metres)

Premkumar trains with coach P. Nagarajan at St. Joseph's Sports Academy, Chennai. He represented the academy at the 84th Senior State Athletics Championship held in Coimbatore in May 2011, and won a gold medal with a jump of 7.75 metres (25.4 ft). He represented Tamil Nadu at the South Zone Junior Athletics Championship held in Chennai in August 2011. He set a new national junior record with 7.52 metres (24.7 ft) and won gold.

Premkumar participated in the 2012 Asian Indoor Athletics Championships that took place in Hangzhou, China. He won a bronze medal and set the national indoor record with a 7.62-metre (25.0 ft) jump. The previous record was held by Maha Singh, who jumped 7.49 metres (24.6 ft) at the 2006 Asian Indoor Athletics Championships in Pattaya, Thailand. Premkumar was the only Indian to win a medal at the championships. He competed in the 2012 World Junior Championships in Barcelona, Spain and finished 16th in the qualification round with the best jump of 7.38 metres (24.2 ft), which was not sufficient to qualify him for the final. He set his personal best of 8 metres (26 ft) at the National Inter-State Championships in Chennai in June 2013. A month after the championships, Premkumar won a silver medal at the 2013 Asian Athletics Championships in Pune with the best jump of 7.92 metres (26.0 ft).

Premkumar failed to qualify for the 2013 World Championships because his 8.12-metre (26.6 ft) jump (more than the 'B' qualifying standard for the championships) at a meet in the United States Olympic Training Center in Chula Vista, California, was wind assisted beyond the 2 metres per second permissible limit, cancelling out the national record and the qualifying effort. At the 79th Railways Athletic Championships in New Delhi, he represented Integral Coach Factory team. He won the gold and cleared a distance of 8.09 metres (26.5 ft) in the men's long jump final to erase a nine-year-old national record of 8.08 metres (26.5 ft), set by Amritpal Singh in 2002 at the 10th Federation Cup Athletics Championships in New Delhi. Premkumar was declared best athlete of the championships for his record-breaking performance, and was awarded with the Marshal Tito Cup.

== See also ==
- Sports in Tamil Nadu
