= 2026 Asian Indoor Athletics Championships =

2026 Asian Indoor Championships
- Dates: 6–8 February
- Host city: Tianjin, China
- Venue: Tuanbo Sports Center Athletics Arena
- Events: 26
- Participation: 290 athletes from 34 nations

The 2026 Asian Indoor Athletics Championships was the twelfth edition of the international indoor athletics event among Asian nations which was held in Tianjin, China from 6 to 8 February 2026.

== Medalists ==
=== Men ===
Event	Gold		Silver		Bronze	
60 metres	Deng Xinrui (CHN)	6.59	Chen Wen-pu (TPE)	6.60 NR	Abdullah Mohammed Dawood (KSA)	6.62
400 metres	Bassem Hemeida (QAT)	47.27	Zheng Chiyu (CHN)	47.34	Arash Sayyari (IRI)	47.59
800 metres	Ibrahim Chuot (QAT)	1:47.64	Ko Ochiai (JPN)	1:48.24	Ma Zhongqiang (CHN)	1:50.04
1500 metres	Zakaria Elahlaami (QAT)	3:43.75	Nursultan Keneshbekov (KGZ)	3:44.75 NR	Liu Dezhu (CHN)	3:45.06
3000 metres	Kazuya Shiojiri (JPN)	7:53.87	Nursultan Keneshbekov (KGZ)	7:55.06 NR	Hossein Nouri (IRN)	8:12.09
60 metres hurdles	Liu Junxi (CHN)	7.53 CR	Shusei Nomoto (JPN)	7.59	Chen Yuanjiang (CHN)	7.67
4 × 400 metres relay	Qatar; Bassem Hemeida; Ashraf Osman; Khala Ngare Mahamat; Ismail Douda Abakar	3:08.68	China; Zheng Chiyu; Liang Baotang; Ju Tianqi; Xiao Heng	3:10.49	Kazakhstan; Andrey Sokolov; Vyacheslav Zems; Madi Tokenov; Elnor Mukhitdinov	3:12.23
High jump	Yuto Seko (JPN)	2.23	Tomohiro Shinno (JPN)	2.19	Jothi Aadarsh Ram (IND)	2.19
Pole vault	Ernest Obiena (PHI)	5.70	Li Chenyang (CHN)	5.60	Chen Yang (CHN)	5.40
Long jump	Zhang Mingkun (CHN)	8.01	Lin Yu Tang (TPE)	7.87	Shu Heng (CHN)	7.82
Triple jump	Su Wen (CHN)	16.55	Jiao Xinping (CHN)	16.47	Ma Yinglong (CHN)	16.45
Shot put	Chen Chengyu (CHN)	20.07 CR	Tajinderpal Singh Toor (IND)	20.05 NR	Xing Jialiang (CHN)	19.99
Heptathlon	Tejaswin Shankar (IND)	5993 NR CR	Zihui Hua (CHN)	5749	Yuma Maruyama (JPN)	5637

=== Women ===
Event	Gold		Silver		Bronze	
60 metres	Xu Jialu (CHN)	7.28	Liao Yan Jun (TPE)	7.30 NR	Liu Xiajun (CHN)	7.38
400 metres	Jonbibi Hukmova (UZB)	53.61	Zahra Zareei (IRI)	54.18	Zuo Siyu (CHN)	54.62
800 metres	Wu Hongjiao (CHN)	2:08.56	Sabokhat Samijonova (UZB)	2:09.575	Toktam Dastarbandan (IRI)	2:09.576
1500 metres	Nozomi Tanaka (JPN)	4:19.15	Li Chunhui (CHN)	4:19.54	Norah Jeruto (KAZ)	4:20.04
3000 metres	Norah Jeruto (KAZ)	8:46.87 NR	Nozomi Tanaka (JPN)	8:48.22	Luo Xia (CHN)	9:16.18
60 metres hurdles	Zhang Bo Ya (TPE)	8.12 NR	Chisato Kiyoyama (JPN)	8.142	Hitomi Nakajima (JPN)	8.147
4 × 400 metres relay	Kazakhstan; Mariya Shuvalova; Anna Shumilo; Kristina Kondrashova; Adelina Zems	3:38.02	China; Kong Yingying; Li Fengdan; Huang Shiyao; Zuo Siyu	3:38.29	Only two entrants	
High jump	Valeriya Gorbatova (UZB)	1.87	Pooja Singh (IND) Nadezhda Dubovitskaya (KAZ)	1.87 NU20R 1.87	Not awarded	
Pole vault	Niu Chunge (CHN)	4.35	Misaki Morota (JPN)	4.35	Wei Lingxia (CHN)	4.25
Long jump	Xiong Shiqi (CHN)	6.42	Li Zhishuang (CHN)	6.39	Ancy Sojan (IND)	6.21
Triple jump	Sharifa Davronova (UZB)	14.05	Li Yi (CHN)	13.87	Mariya Yefremova (KAZ)	13.68
Shot put	Song Jiayuan (CHN)	18.36	Jiang Yue (CHN)	17.11	Sun Yue (CHN)	15.95
Pentathlon	Alina Chistyakova (KAZ)	4181	Xu Jiahuan (CHN)	4091	Zheng Wu (CHN)	4013

== Medal table ==
* Host nation (China)

Rank	Nation	Gold	Silver	Bronze	Total
1	China (CHN)*	10	11	13	34
2	Qatar (QAT)	4	0	0	4
3	Japan (JPN)	3	6	2	11
4	Uzbekistan (UZB)	3	1	0	4
5	Kazakhstan (KAZ)	3	0	4	7
6	Chinese Taipei (TPE)	1	3	0	4
7	India (IND)	1	2	2	5
8	Philippines (PHI)	1	0	0	1
9	Kyrgyzstan (KGZ)	0	2	0	2
10	Iran (IRI)	0	1	3	4
11	Saudi Arabia (KSA)	0	0	1	1
Totals (11 entries)		26	26	25	77

== Participating nations ==
- Afghanistan (1)
- Bangladesh (1)
- Cambodia (2)
- China (67)
- Chinese Taipei (6)
- Hong Kong (14)
- India (16)
- Indonesia (10)
- Iran (8)
- Japan (18)
- Kazakhstan (23)
- Kuwait (13)
- Kyrgyzstan (5)
- Lebanon (3)
- Macau (10)
- Malaysia (2)
- Maldives (2)
- Mongolia (4)
- Nepal (3)
- North Korea (2)
- Oman (2)
- Pakistan (5)
- Philippines (4)
- Qatar (9)
- Saudi Arabia (7)
- Singapore (9)
- South Korea (3)
- Sri Lanka (7)
- Syria (1)
- Tajikistan (2)
- Thailand (6)
- Turkmenistan (5)
- Uzbekistan (17)
- Vietnam (3)
