= List of Iranian records in athletics =

The following are the national records in athletics in Iran maintained by Athletic Federation of Islamic Republic of Iran (AAFIRI).

== Outdoor ==
Key to tables: Awaiting ratification Record not kept by AAFIRI Not ratified or later rescinded by AAFIRI

=== Men ===
Event	Record	Athlete	Date	Meet	Place	Ref
100 m	10.03 (+1.2 m/s)	Hassan Taftian	30 June 2018	Meeting de Paris	Paris, France	
100 m	10.03 (−0.3 m/s)	Hassan Taftian	24 August 2019	Meeting de Paris	Paris, France	
200 m	20.63 (+1.0 m/s) ^{a}	Mohammad Hossein Abareghi	14 June 2014	Asian Junior Championships	Taipei, Taiwan	
400 m	45.40 A	Sajjad Hashemi	13 June 2021	Erzurum Sprint & Relay Cup	Erzurum, Turkey	
800 m	1:44.74	Sajjad Moradi	4 September 2005	Asian Championships	Incheon, South Korea	
1500 m	3:36.92	Seyedamir Zamanpour	9 May 2025	UAE Grand Prix	Dubai, United Arab Emirates	
3000 m	8:07.05	Mehdi Zarenejad	12 July 2002	Honvéd Cup	Budapest, Hungary	
5000 m	13:50.08	Seyedamir Zamanpour	18 May 2024	Turkish National Team Trials	İzmir, Turkey	
10,000 m	29:22.65	Hamid Sajjadi	26 July 1996	Olympic Games	Atlanta, United States	
Half marathon	1:05:25	Mansour Bayat ^{b}	11 November 2023	Asian Championships	Dubai, United Arab Emirates	
Marathon	2:17:14	Mohammad Jafar Moradi	24 September 2023	Berlin Marathon	Berlin, Germany	
110 m hurdles	13.50 (+0.1 m/s)	Rouhollah Askari	1 July 2012	Qosanov Memorial	Almaty, Kazakhstan	
400 m hurdles	49.33	Mehdi Pirjahan	28 August 2019	Indian Inter-State Championships	Lucknow, India	
400 m hurdles	49.33	Mehdi Pirjahan	2 October 2020	Iran Clubs Championships	Tehran, Iran	
400 m hurdles	49.33	Mehdi Pirjahan	3 August 2023	World University Games	Chengdu, China	
3000 m steeplechase	8:22.79	Hossein Keyhani	27 August 2018	Asian Games	Jakarta, Indonesia	
High jump	2.26 m	Keivan Ghanbarzadeh	20 April 2012	National Championships	Shiraz, Iran	
High jump	2.26 m	Keivan Ghanbarzadeh	22 June 2015	Asian Grand Prix	Bangkok, Thailand	
High jump	2.26 m	Keivan Ghanbarzadeh	25 June 2015	Asian Grand Prix	Pathum Thani, Thailand	
Pole vault	5.36 m	Mohsen Rabbani	7 August 2009	Iran Clubs Championships	Tehran, Iran	
Long jump	8.17 m (+1.3 m/s)	Mohammad Arzandeh	7 July 2012	National Olympic Trials	Tehran, Iran	
Triple jump	16.62 m (+1.1 m/s)	Hamid Reza Kia	11 April 2021	Imam Reza Cup	Mashhad, Iran	
Shot put	20.87 m	Mohammad Reza Tayyebi	13 March 2025	Ramezan Cup	Tehran, Iran	
Discus throw	69.32 m AR	Ehsan Haddadi	3 June 2008	EAA Meeting	Tallinn, Estonia	
Hammer throw	77.40 m	Kaveh Mousavi	8 July 2016	Ivan Tsikhan Tournament	Zhyrovichy, Belarus	
Javelin throw	77.60 m	Ali Fathi	6 September 2025	Iran Clubs Championships	Tehran, Iran	
Decathlon	7729 pts	Hadi Sepehrzad	24–25 May 2012	Iran Clubs Championships	Tehran, Iran	
Decathlon	100m (wind) / Long jump (wind) / Shot put / High jump / 400m / 110m H (wind) / Discus / Pole vault / Javelin / 1500m; 10.82 / 6.94 m / 16.24 m / 1.94 m / 49.82 / 14.80 / 49.11 m / 4.40 m / 52.66 m / 5:09.59					
10,000 m walk (track)	41:11.1 h	Hamid Reza Zouravand	2 May 2016	National Championships	Shiraz, Iran	
10 km walk (road)	43:58	Ebrahim Rahimian	22 May 2008		Tehran, Iran	
20 km walk (road)	1:22:52	Hamid Reza Zouravand	20 March 2016	Asian Championships	Nomi, Japan	
50 km walk (road)						
4 × 100 m relay	39.69	(Iran) Naft Tehran; Reza Ghasemi; Alireza Habibi; Mehdi Zamani; Hassan Taftian	21 June 2013	Iran Clubs Championships	Tehran, Iran	
4 × 400 m relay	3:07.57	Iran; Reza Bouazar; Sajjad Hashemi; Sajjad Moradi; Edvard Mangasar	20 September 2010	West Asian Championships	Aleppo, Syria	

=== Women ===
Event	Record	Athlete	Date	Meet	Place	Ref
100 m	11.33 (+1.0 m/s)	Hamideh Esmaeilnejad	13 July 2023	Asian Championships	Bangkok, Thailand	
200 m	23.22 (+1.2 m/s)	Maryam Tousi	25 May 2024	Grand Prix Internacional	Bogotá, Colombia	
400 m	52.95	Maryam Tousi	8 May 2012	Asian Grand Prix	Bangkok, Thailand	
400 m	51.97	Zahra Zareei	21 May 2026	Bandar Torkaman Grand Prix	Bandar Torkaman, Iran	
800 m	2:07.29	Toktam Dastarbandan	6 September 2024	Iran Clubs Championships	Tehran, Iran	
1500 m	4:27.73	Leila Ebrahimi	23 November 2010	Asian Games	Guangzhou, China	
3000 m	9:49.42	Hanieh Shahpari	30 May 2026	Asian U20 Championships	Hong Kong	
3000 m	9:54.11	Parichehr Shahi	27 May 2022	Afgan Safarov Memorial	Baku, Azerbaijan	
5000 m	16:37.84	Parisa Arab	11 June 2023	Tehran Grand Prix	Tehran, Iran	
10,000 m	34:10.61	Parisa Arab	9 May 2025	National Championships	Rasht, Iran	
Half marathon	1:16:55	Mandana Nouri	3 April 2022	Berlin Half Marathon	Berlin, Germany	
Marathon	2:45:23	Mandana Nouri	5 December 2021	Valencia Marathon	Valencia, Spain	
100 m hurdles	13.64 (+0.2 m/s)	Elnaz Kompani	17 August 2023	Iran Clubs Championships	Tehran, Iran	
400 m hurdles	58.86	Nazanin Fatemeh Eidian	26 April 2024	Asian U20 Championships	Dubai, United Arab Emirates	
3000 m steeplechase	10:29.24	Hanieh Shahpari	8 August 2025	National U20 Championships	Shiraz, Iran	
3000 m steeplechase	10:26.34	Hanieh Shahpari	29 May 2026	Asian U20 Championships	Hong Kong	
High jump	1.84 m	Sepideh Tavakkoli	21 May 2018	Iran Golden League	Tehran, Iran	
Pole vault	4.04 m	Mahsa Mirzatabibi	31 July 2024	Iran Clubs Championships	Tehran, Iran	
Long jump	6.53 m (+2.0 m/s)	Reihaneh Mobini	23 January 2025	National Team Trials	Bushehr, Iran	
Triple jump	13.29 m (−0.6 m/s)	Maryam Kazemi	23 August 2024	Iran Clubs Championships	Tehran, Iran	
Shot put	18.18 m	Leila Rajabi	6 July 2013	Asian Championships	Pune, India	
Discus throw	53.84 m	Mahla Mahroughi	6 September 2024	Iran Clubs Championships	Tehran, Iran	
Hammer throw	61.84 m	Zahra Arab-Rostami	12 March 2025	Ramezan Cup	Tehran, Iran	
Javelin throw	51.88 m	Mana Hosseini	15 March 2024	National U20 Team Trials	Tehran, Iran	
Heptathlon	5562 pts	Fatemeh Mohitizadeh	19–20 November 2025	Islamic Solidarity Games	Riyadh, Saudi Arabia	
Heptathlon	100m H (wind) / High jump / Shot put / 200m (wind) / Long jump (wind) / Javelin / 800m; 13.95 / 1.68 m / 11.93 m / 25.40 / 6.12 m / 34.28 m / 2:22.02					
Heptathlon	5616 pts	Fatemeh Mohitizadeh	15–16 June 2026	Tehran Grand Prix	Tehran, Iran	
Heptathlon	100m H (wind) / High jump / Shot put / 200m (wind) / Long jump (wind) / Javelin / 800m; 14.23 / 1.70 m / 12.17 m / 25.44 / 6.13 m / 39.75 m / 2:26.01					
5000 m walk (track)	27:39.00	Fatemeh Zahra Ghalenoui	30 May 2024	West Asian Championships	Basra, Iraq	
10,000 m walk (track)	52:31.00	Zahra Jafarabadi	11 August 2017	Iran Clubs Championships	Tehran, Iran	
20 km walk (road)	1:54:42	Zahra Jafarabadi	8 February 2020	National Team Trials	Tehran, Iran	
4 × 100 m relay	46.14	(Iran) Chadormaloo Ardakan; Farzaneh Fasihi; Fatemeh Adabi; Sanaz Amiripour; Faezeh Ashourpour	31 August 2022	Iran Clubs Championships	Tehran, Iran	
4 × 400 m relay	3:46.44	(Iran) Kara Machinery Arena; Nazanin Fatemeh Eidian; Kajan Rostami; Toktam Dastarbandan; Negin Azari Edalat	6 September 2024	Iran Clubs Championships	Tehran, Iran	

== Indoor ==
=== Men ===
Event	Record	Athlete	Date	Meet	Place	Ref
60 m	6.51	Hassan Taftian	1 February 2018	Asian Championships	Tehran, Iran	
200 m	21.21	Sajjad Hashemi	14 February 2021	Turkey Indoor Trials	Istanbul, Turkey	
400 m	46.95	Ali Khadivar	18 February 2018	Istanbul Cup	Istanbul, Turkey	
800 m	1:47.04	Sobhan Ahmadi	19 February 2024	Asian Championships	Tehran, Iran	
1500 m	3:43.37	Amir Zamanpour	21 March 2025	World Championships	Nanjing, China	
3000 m	8:07.09	Hossein Keyhani	19 September 2017	Asian Indoor & Martial Arts Games	Ashgabat, Turkmenistan	
60 m hurdles	7.82	Rouhollah Askari	8 February 2004	Asian Championships	Tehran, Iran	
High jump	2.26 m	Keivan Ghanbarzadeh	20 September 2017	Asian Indoor & Martial Arts Games	Ashgabat, Turkmenistan	
Pole vault	5.30 m	Mohsen Rabbani	4 February 2012	Fajr Cup	Mashhad, Iran	
Long jump	7.80 m	Mohammad Arzandeh	15 February 2014	Asian Championships	Hangzhou, China	
Triple jump	16.41 m	Hamid Reza Kia	12 January 2023	Iran Clubs Championships	Tehran, Iran	
Shot put	20.74 m	Shahin Mehrdelan	9 January 2020	Fajr Cup	Tehran, Iran	
Heptathlon	5515 pts	Hadi Sepehrzad	15–16 February 2008	Asian Championships	Doha, Qatar	
Heptathlon	60m / Long jump / Shot put / High jump / 60m H / Pole vault / 1000m; 7.06 / 6.97 m / 16.03 m / 1.93 m / 8.27 / 4.00 m / 2:54.20					
5000 m walk	20:22.88	Mohammad Reza Banaei	10 February 2000	Fajr Cup	Rasht, Iran	
4 × 400 m relay	3:11.74	Iran; Reza Kashef; Sajjad Hashemi; Mehdi Rahimi; Ali Khadivar	3 February 2018	Asian Championships	Tehran, Iran	

=== Women ===
Event	Record	Athlete	Date	Meet	Place	Ref
60 m	7.20	Farzaneh Fasihi	18 February 2024	Asian Championships	Tehran, Iran	
200 m	23.47	Maryam Tousi	21 February 2025	Arkansas Qualifier	Fayetteville, United States	
400 m	53.85	Maryam Tousi	18 February 2012	Asian Championships	Hangzhou, China	
800 m	2:09.17	Toktam Dastarbandan	19 February 2024	Asian Championships	Tehran, Iran	
1500 m	4:26.10	Leila Ebrahimi	31 October 2009	Asian Indoor Games	Hanoi, Vietnam	
3000 m	9:44.31	Parisa Arab	31 January 2024	Iran Clubs Championships	Tehran, Iran	
3000 m	9:43.91	Hanieh Shahpari	4 January 2026	National Championships	Tehran, Iran	
60 m hurdles	8.39	Elnaz Kompani	31 January 2024	Iran Clubs Championships	Tehran, Iran	
High jump	1.83 m ^{c}	Sepideh Tavakkoli	3 February 2018	Asian Championships	Tehran, Iran	
Pole vault	4.10 m	Mahsa Mirzatabibi	19 February 2024	Asian Championships	Tehran, Iran	
Long jump	6.16 m	Reihaneh Mobini	17 February 2024	Asian Championships	Tehran, Iran	
Triple jump	13.08 m	Maryam Kazemi	12 January 2024	Tehran Grand Prix	Tehran, Iran	
Shot put	17.60 m	Leila Rajabi	20 January 2012	National Team Trials	Tehran, Iran	
Shot put	17.60 m	Leila Rajabi	4 February 2012	Fajr Cup	Mashhad, Iran	
Pentathlon	4038 pts	Sepideh Tavakkoli	3 February 2018	Asian Championships	Tehran, Iran	
Pentathlon	60m H / High jump / Shot put / Long jump / 800m; 9.00 / 1.83 m / 12.41 m / 5.61 m / 2:30.05					
3000 m walk	14:54.31	Fatemeh Shabanloo	13 January 2023	Iran Clubs Championships	Tehran, Iran	
4 × 400 m relay	3:41.72	Iran; Kajan Rostami; Shahla Mahmoudi; Maryam Mohebbi; Nazanin Fatemeh Eidian	19 February 2024	Asian Championships	Tehran, Iran	

== Notes ==
- ^a On 26 July 2015 Mohammad Hossein Abareghi run a 20.47 at the Qosanov Memorial which was later annulled due to doping violation.
- ^b On 11 November 2023 Saber Charkhi run a 1:05:25 at the same competition which was later annulled due to doping violation.
- ^c Record set during pentathlon competition.
