= Ji Wei (hurdler) =

Chinese hurdler (born 1984)

Medal record

Men's athletics

Representing China

Asian Indoor Championships
| Gold medal – first place | 2008 Doha | 60 m hurdles |
| Bronze medal – third place | 2012 Hangzhou | 60 m hurdles |

Ji Wei (纪 伟, Jǐ Wěi; born on 5 February 1984 in Tianjin) is a Chinese hurdler.

He won the silver medal at the 2007 Universiade. He represented his country at the 2008 Summer Olympics with Liu Xiang and Shi Dongpeng.

His personal best time is 13.40 seconds, achieved in September 2007 in Urumqi.

== Competition record ==
| Year | Competition | Venue | Position | Event | Notes |
Representing China
| 2007 | Universiade | Bangkok, Thailand | 2nd | 110 m hurdles | 13.57 |
| 2008 | Asian Indoor Championships | Doha, Qatar | 1st | 60 m hurdles | 7.79 |
| 2008 | Olympic Games | Beijing, China | 29th (qf) | 110 m hurdles | 13.80 |
| 2009 | World Championships | Berlin, Germany | 8th | 110 m hurdles | 13.57 |
| 2009 | Asian Indoor Games | Hanoi, Vietnam | 1st | 60 m hurdles | 7.69 |
| 2009 | East Asian Games | Hong Kong | 2nd | 110 m hurdles | 13.88 |
| 2012 | Asian Indoor Championships | Hangzhou, China | 3rd | 60 m hurdles | 7.85 |
| 2013 | Asian Championships | Pune, India | 9th (h) | 110 m hurdles | 13.98 |
| 2013 | East Asian Games | Tianjin, China | 3rd | 110 m hurdles | 13.70 |
