= Liu Qing (runner) =

Chinese middle-distance runner

Medal record

Women's athletics

Representing China

Asian Indoor Championships
Silver medal – second place	2004 Tehran	800 m

Liu Qing (Chinese: 刘青; pinyin: Liú Qīng; born 28 April 1986 in Xuecheng, Shandong) is a Chinese middle-distance runner who specializes in the 800 and 1500 metres.

At the 2005 Summer Universiade she finished fourth in the 800 m and won a bronze in the 1500 m, and at the 2006 Asian Games she finished seventh and sixth. She competed in both events at the 2007 World Championships without reaching the final. She represented her country in the 1500 metres event at the 2008 Summer Olympics. At this event she led the pack at the early stages, perhaps to avoid being jostled by the bigger and bulkier competitors. Her early sprint robbed her of speed for the rest of the run and she was overtaken with some jostling and she lagged out of contention.

Her personal best 800 metres time is 1:59.74 minutes, achieved in October 2005 in Nanjing. In the 1500 metres she has 4:04.00 minutes, achieved in the same time and place.
