= Abdul Rashid (hurdler) =

Pakistani hurdler (1979–2025)

Personal information
- Nationality: Pakistan
- Born: 15 February 1979 Khanewal, Punjab, Pakistan
- Died: 6 December 2025 (aged 46)
- Height: 1.84 m (6 ft 1/2 in)
- Weight: 70 kg (154 lb)

Sport
- Sport: Athletics
- Events: 110 m hurdles & 60 m hurdles

Achievements and titles
- Personal best: 110 m hurdles: 14.24 s 60 m hurdles : 7.95 s (National record)
Medal record
Men's athletics
Representing Pakistan
Asian Indoor Championships
Silver medal – second place	2008 Doha	60 m hurdles
Asian Indoor Games
Silver medal – second place	2005 Bangkok	60 m hurdles
South Asian Games
Gold medal – first place	2004 Islamabad	110 m hurdles
Bronze medal – third place	2006 Colombo	110 m hurdles

Abdul Rashid (Urdu: عبد الرشید; 15 February 1979 – 6 December 2025) was a Pakistani hurdler. Rashid represented Pakistan at the 2008 Summer Olympics in Beijing, where he competed for the men's 110 m hurdles. He ran in the third heat against seven other athletes, including three-time Olympian Dudley Dorival of Haiti. He finished the heat in the last place, nearly two seconds behind Dorival, with a time of 14:52, twenty-eight hundredths of a second slower than his personal best of 14:24. Rashid failed to advance into the quarterfinal round, as he placed fortieth overall, based on his time and performance in the preliminary heats.

He made a national record of 7.95 seconds in the men's Indoor 60 m hurdles event on 14 November 2005 at the 2005 Asian Indoor Games in Pattaya, Thailand. He won a gold medal in 110 metre hurdles (14.33s) at the 2004 South Asian Games at Jinnah Stadium in Islamabad, Pakistan. He also won a bronze medal in 110 metre hurdles (14.62s) at the 2006 South Asian Games held at the Sugathadasa Stadium in Colombo, Sri Lanka.

Rashid died of a heart attack on 6 December 2025, at the age of 46.

== See also ==
- List of Pakistani records in athletics
- Athletics in Pakistan
- Pakistan at the Olympics
