= Leila Ebrahimi =

Iranian middle-distance runner

Personal information
- Born: 21 April 1979 (age 47) Tehran, Iran
- Height: 170 cm (5 ft 7 in)
- Weight: 56 kg (123 lb)

Sport
- Country: Iran
- Sport: Athletics
- Event: Middle-distance running
Medal record
Representing Iran
Women's athletics
Asian Championships
Bronze medal – third place	2007 Amman	3000 m st.
Asian Indoor Championships
Gold medal – first place	2004 Tehran	4×400 m relay
Silver medal – second place	2004 Tehran	3000 m
Silver medal – second place	2010 Tehran	3000 m
Bronze medal – third place	2004 Tehran	1500 m
Bronze medal – third place	2010 Tehran	1500 m
- Updated on 16 December 2020

Leila Ebrahimi Mojaveri (Persian: لیلا ابراهیمی مجاوری, born 21 April 1979, in Tehran) is an Iranian retired middle distance runner.

She started running at the age 16 in 2001. She finished tenth in the 1500 metres at the 2006 Asian Games and won the bronze medal in the 3000 metres steeplechase at the 2007 Asian Championships.

She hold Iran's national records in 1500 meters and 3000 meters in outdoor and indoor.

== Personal life ==
After her career as a runner, she opened her own Academy, and is now coaching several of Iran's best female runners.

Leila got engaged in 2022.
