= Amritpal Singh (long jumper) =

Indian long jumper

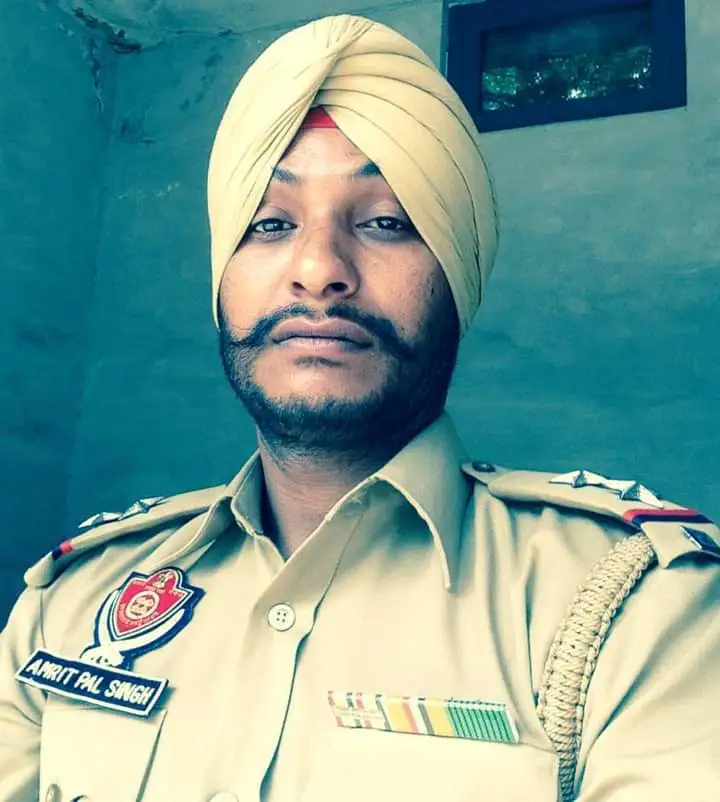

Personal information
- Full name: Amrit Pal Singh
- Nationality: Indian
- Born: 10 June 1983 Sangrur, Punjab, India
- Height: 1.83 m (6 ft 0 in)
- Weight: 80 kg (176 lb)

Sport
- Country: India
- Sport: Track and field athletics
- Event: Long jump

Achievements and titles
- Personal best(s): Long jump: 8.08 m (Outdoor) (New Delhi 2004)
- Updated on 9 September 2013

Amritpal Singh (born 6 October 1983 in Sangrur, Punjab) was an Indian track and field athlete from Punjab who specialized in long jump. He held the national record from 2004 to 2013.

== Career ==
Singh, with an 8.08 metres jump at the 10th Federation Cup Athletics Championships in New Delhi on 16 March 2004, bettered the 30-year record held by T. C. Yohannan. It was eventually bettered by Kumaravel Premkumar in 2013 with a jump of 8.09 meters.

Singh was one among four Indians to go beyond the eight-metre mark; the others being T. C. Yohannan (in 1974), Sanjay Kumar Rai (in 2000). and Kumaravel Premkumar in 2013. He worked for Punjab Police as an Inspector.

Though Singh had passed the qualifying norm of 8.05 m for the 2004 Athens Olympics, he was left out because of unsatisfactory form and fitness.
