= Ebrahim Rahimian =

Iranian racewalker

Medal record

Men's athletics

Representing Iran

Asian Indoor Championships
Silver medal – second place	2004 Tehran	5000 m walk

Ebrahim Rahimian (born 29 June 1981 in Ardabil) is an Iranian racewalker. He competed in the 20 km walk at the 2012 Summer Olympics but did not finish the race. In 2013 he failed a doping test for EPO and was sanctioned or provisionally suspended by the IAAF.
