= 2008 Asian Indoor Athletics Championships =

2008 Asian Indoor Championships
- Dates: February 14–16
- Host city: Doha, Qatar
- Venue: ASPIRE Dome
- Events: 26
- Participation: 202 athletes from 29 nations

The 2008 Asian Indoor Athletics Championships was an international indoor athletics event took place in Doha, Qatar, between 14 and 16 February.

== Results ==
=== Men ===
Event	Gold		Silver		Bronze	
60 m	Samuel Francis; Qatar	6.62; CR	Leung Chun Wai; Hong Kong	6.79	Vyacheslav Muravyev; Kazakhstan	6.79
400 m	Liu Xiaosheng; China	47.82; CR	Sergey Zaikov; Kazakhstan	48.12	Ali Shirook; United Arab Emirates	48.24; NR
800 m	Yusuf Saad Kamel; Bahrain	1:48.03 =CR	Ehsan Mohajer Shojaei; Iran	1:48.68	Masato Yokota; Japan	1:49.30
1500 m	Thamer Kamal Ali; Qatar	3:40.86; CR	Chatholi Hamza; India	3:41.18; NR	Abubaker Ali Kamal; Qatar	3:42.50
3000 m	Sultan Khamis Zaman; Qatar	7:49.31	Surendra Singh; India	7:49.47; NR	James Kwalia; Qatar	7:50.76
60 m hurdles	Ji Wei; China	7.79	Abdul Rashid; Pakistan	7.98	Muhammad Sajjad; Pakistan	8.01
4×400 m relay	Saudi Arabia; Yonas Al-Hosah; Ali Al-Deraan; Ismail Al-Sabiani; Edrees Hawsawi	3:14.25; CR	India; V. B. Bineesh; Gurvinder Pal Singh; Virender Kumar Pankaj; Thannickkal Aboobcker	3:16.53	Qatar; Mohamed Sagayroon; Adam Ali; Musaeb Abdulrahman Balla; Azmy Sulaiman	3:17.93
High jump	Sergey Zasimovich; Kazakhstan	2.24; CR	Majed Al-Din Ghazal; Syria	2.21	Rashid Al-Mannai; Qatar	2.18
Pole vault	Daichi Sawano; Japan	5.45	Takafumi Suzuki; Japan	5.35	Leonid Andreev; Uzbekistan	5.35
Long jump	Mohammed Al-Khuwalidi; Saudi Arabia	8.24; AR	Saleh Al-Haddad; Kuwait	7.88; NR	Hussein Al-Sabee; Saudi Arabia	7.72
Triple jump	Roman Valiyev; Kazakhstan	16.32	Amarjeet Singh; India	16.24; NR	Theerayut Philakong; Thailand	16.04; NR
Shot put	Ahmad Gholoum; Kuwait	18.55; CR	Om Prakash Karhana; India	18.37	Yao Yongguang; China	18.16
Heptathlon	P. J. Vinod; India	5561 pts =NR	Hadi Sepehrzad; Iran	5515 pts NR	Hiromasa Tanaka; Japan	5306 pts
WR world record | AR area record | CR championship record | GR games record | NR national record | OR Olympic record | PB personal best | SB season best | WL world leading (in a given season)

=== Women ===
Event	Gold		Silver		Bronze	
60 m	Roqaya Al-Gassra; Bahrain	7.40; CR, NR	Wang Yingju; China	7.47	Nongnuch Sanrat; Thailand	7.49
400 m	Roqaya Al-Gassra; Bahrain	53.28; CR, NR	Marina Maslyonko; Kazakhstan	53.38	Mandeep Kaur; India	54.28
800 m	Sinimol Paulose; India	2:03.43; CR, NR	Sushma Devi; India	2:04.66	Margarita Matsko; Kazakhstan	2:04.85
1500 m	Sinimol Paulose; India	4:15.42; CR, NR	Sushma Devi; India	4:21.78	Sara Bakheet; Bahrain	4:26.70
3000 m	Preeja Sreedharan; India	9:12.26; CR, NR	Kavita Raut; India	9:26.01	Sara Bakheet; Bahrain	9:40.47
60 m hurdles	Liu Jing; China	8.31; CR	Anastassiya Soprunova; Kazakhstan	8.34	Leelavathi Veerappan; India	9.21
4×400 m relay	India; Mandeep Kaur; Manjit Kaur; Sini Jose; Chitra K. Soman	3:37.46; AR	Kazakhstan; Tatyana Azarova; Marina Maslyonko; Viktoriya Yalovtseva; Anna Gavriushenko	3:38.10	Thailand; Jutamass Tawoncharoen; Saowalee Kaewchuay; Kanya Harnthong; Treewadee Yongphan	3:43.22
High jump	Tatyana Efimenko; Kyrgyzstan	1.91	Anna Ustinova; Kazakhstan	1.91	Yekaterina Yevseyeva; Kazakhstan	1.88
Pole vault	Ikuko Nishikori; Japan	4.10	Roslinda Samsu; Malaysia	4.10	Takayo Kondo; Japan	4.10
Long jump	Chen Yaling; China	6.39	Anju Bobby George; India	6.38	M. A. Prajusha; India	6.09
Triple jump	Olga Rypakova; Kazakhstan	14.23; CR	Li Qian; China	13.76	Liu Yanan; China	13.39
Shot put	Gong Lijiao; China	18.12; CR	Iolanta Ulyeva; Kazakhstan	15.99	Juttaporn Krasaeyan; Thailand	14.73
Pentathlon	Irina Naumenko; Kazakhstan	4235 pts	Wassana Winatho; Thailand	4184 pts NR	Olga Lapina; Kazakhstan	3906 pts
WR world record | AR area record | CR championship record | GR games record | NR national record | OR Olympic record | PB personal best | SB season best | WL world leading (in a given season)

== Medal table ==
Rank	Nation	Gold	Silver	Bronze	Total
1	India	5	9	3	17
2	China	5	2	2	9
3	Kazakhstan	4	6	4	14
4	Qatar	3	0	4	7
5	Bahrain	3	0	2	5
6	Japan	2	1	3	6
7	Saudi Arabia	2	0	1	3
8	Kuwait	1	1	0	2
9	Kyrgyzstan	1	0	0	1
10	Iran	0	2	0	2
11	Thailand	0	1	4	5
12	Pakistan	0	1	1	2
13	Hong Kong	0	1	0	1
13	Malaysia	0	1	0	1
13	Syria	0	1	0	1
16	United Arab Emirates	0	0	1	1
16	Uzbekistan	0	0	1	1
Totals (17 entries)		26	26	26	78

== Participating nations ==
A total of 29 nations were represented by athletes competing at the 2008 championships.

- Bahrain (10)
- China (16)
- Chinese Taipei (3)
- Hong Kong (6)
- India (31)
- Indonesia (3)
- Iran (5)
- Iraq (3)
- Japan (12)
- Jordan (2)
- Kazakhstan (23)
- Kuwait (8)
- Kyrgyzstan (4)
- Laos (2)
- Lebanon (2)
- Macau (1)
- Malaysia (3)
- Maldives (2)
- Oman (3)
- Pakistan (5)
- Palestine (1)
- Qatar (19)
- Saudi Arabia (11)
- Singapore (3)
- Syria (3)
- Tajikistan (3)
- Thailand (12)
- United Arab Emirates (3)
- Uzbekistan (3)
