= Ruqaya Al-Ghasra =

Bahraini sprinter (born 1982)

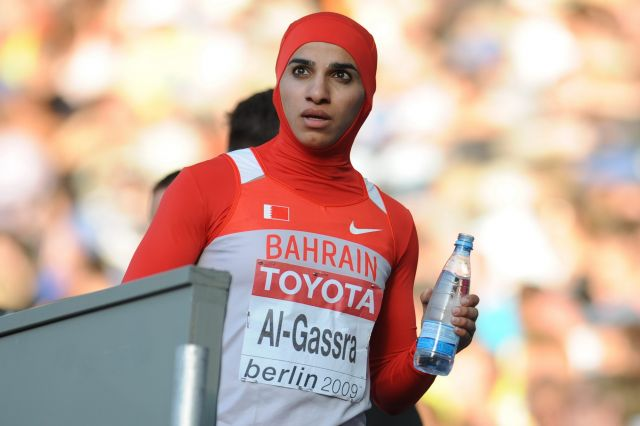
- Al-Ghasra at the 2009 World Championships

Personal information
- Born: 6 September 1982 (age 44)

Sport
- Country: Bahrain
- Sport: Athletics
- Events: 100 m, 200 m, 200 m
Medal record
Women's Athletics
Representing Bahrain
Arab Athletics Championships
Gold medal – first place	2003 Lebanon	100 m
Gold medal – first place	2003 Lebanon	200 m
Asian Indoor Championships
Silver medal – second place	2004 Iran	60 m
Silver medal – second place	2004 Iran	200 m
Silver medal – second place	2004 Iran	400 m
Gold medal – first place	2008 Doha	60 m
Gold medal – first place	2008 Doha	400 m
Asian Games
Bronze medal – third place	2006 Doha	100 m
Gold medal – first place	2006 Doha	200 m

Ruqaya Al-Ghasra or Rakia Al Gassra (Arabic: رقية الغسرة; born September 6, 1982), is a retired Bahraini athlete. She was one of the first women to represent Bahrain at the Olympic Games, by taking part in the women's 100 metres sprint at the 2004 Summer Olympics in Athens.

She won medals at the 2006 Asian Games and went on to run at the 2008 Beijing Olympics and the 2009 World Championships in Athletics.

Al-Ghasra announced her international retirement in 2009, although it was revealed later in July 2010 that she had failed an out of competition doping test and she was banned from competing for two years (between September 17, 2009, and September 16, 2011).

== Career ==
=== 2004 Olympic debut ===
ESPN stated that Al-Ghasra "overcame the objections of fundamentalists in her village" to participate. She ran with a head scarf and her body fully covered. She finished fifth in her heat, with a time of 11.49 seconds, and did not advance. A time of 11.43 seconds would have enabled her to qualify for the following round. By 2006, she had improved her time to 11.34 seconds.

In 2003, Al-Ghasra had won gold in the 100 metre and 200 metre races at the Arabian Championships in Lebanon.

In 2004, prior to the Olympics, she won three silver medals, in the 60 metre, 200 metre and 400 metre races, at the Asian Indoor Championships in Iran. She also represented Bahrain in the 400 metre event at the World Indoor Championships in Budapest.

=== Regional medals ===
In 2006, Al-Ghasra won the gold medal in the 200 metre race at the Asian Games, in Doha. This made her the first Bahraini-born athlete to win gold at a major international athletics competition extending beyond the Arab world. She also won bronze in the 100 metre race. In 2007, she was scheduled to take part in the Pan Arab Games in Egypt, the Asian Championships in Lebanon and the IAAF World Championships in Osaka. She pulled out of the latter championships due to injury.

In 2008, Al-Ghasra won gold in the 60 metre race at the Asian Indoor Championships in Doha, setting a new championships record with a time of 7.40 seconds.

=== 2008 Olympics and 2009 World Championships ===
She qualified to compete in the 100 metre and 200 metre events at the 2008 Summer Olympics in Beijing, but only competed in the 200 metre race where she reached the semi-finals. She was her country's flagbearer at the Games' opening ceremony.

At the 2009 World Championships in Athletics in Berlin, she reached the quarter-finals of the 100 m, and the semi-finals of the 200 m, recording season's bests of 11.49 and 23.26 seconds respectively, although these results were later disqualified to an anti-doping ban. At the end of the year, she announced her retirement from international athletics at the age of 27, to much surprise. She said that she came to the decision following consultation with doctors and specialists, who advised to take a long period off in order to undergo treatment and improve her general health. However, it was revealed in July 2010 that Al-Ghasra had failed an out of competition doping test and she was banned from competing for two years (between September 17, 2009, and September 16, 2011).

== See also ==
- List of doping cases in athletics
