= 2004 Asian Indoor Athletics Championships =

2004 Asian Indoor Championships
- Dates: February 6–8
- Host city: Tehran, Iran
- Venue: Aftab Enghelab Complex
- Events: 30
- Participation: 23 nations

The 2004 Asian Indoor Athletics Championships was an international indoor athletics event took place in Tehran, Iran, between 6 and 8 February. The female events were held separately from the men's events, taking place during the morning sessions. Due to the Islamic country's customs, men were forbidden from watching the female events.

A total of 23 nations sent athletes to compete at the championships, which featured 30 track and field events. China topped the medal table with 11 golds. Iran was second with six golds while Kazakhstan finished third with four golds.

== Results ==
=== Men ===
Event	Gold		Silver		Bronze	
60 m	Abdolghaffar Saghar; Iran	6.76; CR	To Wai Lok; Hong Kong	6.78	Shen Yunbao; China	6.79
200 m	Tomoyuki Arai; Japan	21.56; CR	Liu Haitao; China	21.63	Adel Mohammed; Bahrain	21.87
400 m	Mohammad Akefian; Iran	48.71; CR	Edvard Mangasar; Iran	48.76	Esmaeil Kaboutaran; Iran	49.32
800 m	Rashid Ramzi; Bahrain	1:48.03; AR	Sajjad Moradi; Iran	1:48.48; NR	Yusuf Saad Kamel; Bahrain	1:48.89
1500 m	Rashid Ramzi; Bahrain	3:55.73; CR	Sajjad Moradi; Iran	3:56.00	Ehsan Mohajer Shojaei; Iran	3:56.06
3000 m	Mushir Salem Jawher; Bahrain	8:11.90; CR	Wu Wen-chien; Chinese Taipei	8:24.39	Omid Mehrabi; Iran	8:33.00
60 m hurdles	Wu Youjia; China	7.77; CR	Rouhollah Asgari; Iran	7.82; NR	Mohd Robani Hassan; Malaysia	8.03
5000 m walk	Amir Kheirgoo; Iran	22:12.27; CR	Ebrahim Rahimian; Iran	22:19.56	Sitaram Basat; India	22:22.92
4 × 400 m relay	Iran; Edvard Mangasar; Iraj Iri; Mohammad Akefian; Esmaeil Kaboutaran	3:16.99; CR	India; Amish Pothan; Sunil Joseph; Jasal Preet; Sreedharan Sreejith	3:19.91	Bahrain; Mohamed Al-Rashedi; Adel Mohamed Al-Farhan; Salem; Kam	3:22.21
High jump	Yuriy Pakhlyayev; Kazakhstan	2.23; CR	Zheng Ting; China	2.19	Shuhei Manabe; Japan	2.15
Pole vault	Zhang Hongwei; China	5.40; CR	Eshagh Ghaffari; Iran	5.00	Mohsen Rabbani; Iran	5.00
Long jump	Mohammed Al-Khuwalidi; Saudi Arabia	7.94; CR	Ahmed Al-Dosari; Saudi Arabia	7.76	Cai Peng; China	7.58
Triple jump	Zhu Shujing; China	16.57; CR	Mohammad Hazzory; Syria	16.42; NR	Denis Saurambayev; Kazakhstan	16.17
Shot put	Amin Nikfar; Iran	18.33; CR	Ali Rahmani; Iran	18.30	Wang Zhiyong; China	17.93
Heptathlon	Pavel Dubitskiy; Kazakhstan	5570 pts CR	Ahmad Hosseini; Iran	5387 pts	Rifat Artikov; Uzbekistan	5299 pts
WR world record | AR area record | CR championship record | GR games record | NR national record | OR Olympic record | PB personal best | SB season best | WL world leading (in a given season)

=== Women ===
Event	Gold		Silver		Bronze	
60 m	Zou Yingting; China	7.41; CR	Roqaya Al-Gassra; Bahrain	7.48	Saori Kitakaze; Japan	7.52
200 m	Xie Rong; China	23.91; CR	Roqaya Al-Gassra; Bahrain	24.18; NR	Asami Tanno; Japan	24.99
400 m	Tatyana Roslanova; Kazakhstan	54.46; CR	Roqaya Al-Gassra; Bahrain	55.29	Pinki Pramanik; India	55.64
800 m	Miki Nishimura; Japan	2:10.04; CR	Liu Qing; China	2:14.43	Pinki Pramanik; India	2:15.06
1500 m	Xie Sainan; China	4:29.43; CR	Svetlana Lukasheva; Kazakhstan	4:36.94	Leila Ebrahimi; Iran	4:49.35
3000 m	Svetlana Lukasheva; Kazakhstan	10:10.05; CR	Leila Ebrahimi; Iran	10:23.25	Elham Zanbouri; Iran	11:08.20
60 m hurdles	Xu Jia; China	8.34; CR	Tomoko Motegi; Japan	8.48	Padideh Bolourizadeh; Iran	9.19
3000 m walk	Jasmin Kaur; India	14:54.15; CR	Ameneh Safavi; Iran	17:09.44	Homa Sheikhan; Iran	17:47.55
4 × 400 m relay	Iran; Zohreh Farjam; Mina Pourseifi; Hadis Shahrami; Leila Ebrahimi	4:00.48; CR	Iran; Atefeh Shadman; Nobahar Rezvan; Somayyeh Mehraban; Maedeh Chavoshizadeh	4:03.41	None awarded	
High jump	Miyuki Aoyama; Japan	1.83; CR	Bobby Aloysius; India	1.81	Sahana Kumari; India	1.79
Pole vault	Zhang Na; China	4.20; CR	Roslinda Samsu; Malaysia	4.00	Chang Ko-hsin; Chinese Taipei	3.95
Long jump	Xu Bei; China	6.30; CR	Jetty C. Joseph; India	5.98	Wang Kuo-huei; Chinese Taipei	5.95
Triple jump	Xie Limei; China	13.39; CR	Svetlana Klimina; Uzbekistan	12.83	Wang Kuo-huei; Chinese Taipei	12.61; NR
Shot put	Zhang Xiaoyu; China	17.38; CR	Iolanta Ulyeva; Kazakhstan	16.78	Olga Shukina; Uzbekistan	14.75
Pentathlon	Yuki Nakata; Japan	3977 pts CR	Padideh Bolourizadeh; Iran	3528 pts NR	Svetlana Pessova; Turkmenistan	3287 pts NR
WR world record | AR area record | CR championship record | GR games record | NR national record | OR Olympic record | PB personal best | SB season best | WL world leading (in a given season)

== Medal table ==
Rank	Nation	Gold	Silver	Bronze	Total
1	China	11	3	3	17
2	Iran	6	12	8	26
3	Kazakhstan	4	2	1	7
4	Japan	4	1	3	8
5	Bahrain	3	3	3	9
6	India	1	3	4	8
7	Saudi Arabia	1	1	0	2
8	Chinese Taipei	0	1	3	4
9	Uzbekistan	0	1	2	3
10	Malaysia	0	1	1	2
11	Hong Kong	0	1	0	1
11	Syria	0	1	0	1
13	Turkmenistan	0	0	1	1
Totals (13 entries)		30	30	29	89

== Participating nations ==
A total of 23 nations were represented by athletes competing at the 2004 championships.

- Afghanistan
- Bahrain
- Bangladesh
- China
- Chinese Taipei
- Hong Kong
- India
- Indonesia
- Iran
- Iraq
- Japan
- Kazakhstan
- Kuwait
- Kyrgyzstan
- Malaysia
- Maldives
- Pakistan
- Palestine
- Saudi Arabia
- Singapore
- Syria
- Turkmenistan
- Uzbekistan
