= 2016 Asian Indoor Athletics Championships =

2016 Asian Indoor Championships
- Dates: 19–21 February
- Host city: Doha, Qatar
- Venue: Aspire Dome
- Events: 26
- Participation: 267 athletes from 36 nations
- Records set: 12 championship 3 Asian records

The 2016 Asian Indoor Athletics Championships was the seventh edition of the international indoor athletics event between Asian nations. It took place at the Aspire Dome in Doha, Qatar, between 19 and 21 February.

Three new women's Asian indoor records were set at the competition: 4.70 m (15 ft 5 in) in the pole vault by Li Ling, 51.67 seconds for the 400 metres by Kemi Adekoya, and 3:35.07 minutes for the 4 × 400 metres relay set by Bahrain. In total, twelve championship records were improved at the competition. The host nation Qatar topped the medal table with six gold medals (all on the men's side). China was second with five gold medals and Kazakhstan had four titles to its name.

Five titles from the 2014 edition were defended successfully, including all the men's distance titles. Musaeb Abdulrahman Balla of Qatar won the 800 metres for a second title while his compatriot Mohamad Al-Garni retained both his 1500 metres and 3000 metres gold medals in championship record times. Another championship record defence came from Kuwait's Abdulaziz Al-Mandeel in the 60 metres hurdles. The two other athletes to defend their titles were both high jumpers: Mutaz Essa Barshim took his fourth straight men's title for the host nation and Svetlana Radzivil of Uzbekistan took the honour of being the only returning women's champion to leave undefeated.

Betlhem Desalegn took a women's distance double in the 1500 m and 3000 m, becoming the first Emirati gold medallist in championships history. Swapna Barman was initially the women's pentathlon runner-up, but was disqualified upon appeal for a lane infringement in the final 800 m event. Other prominent disqualifications were home favourites Samuel Francis and Tosin Ogunode, who fell foul of the false start rule in the men's 60 metres. Three infrequent participants reached the medal table for first time: the Philippines through men's 60 m bronze medallist Eric Cray, Sri Lanka courtesy of women's 800 m runner-up Nimali Waliwarsha Arachchige and men's high jump third-placer Manjula Kumara, and finally Jordan via their women's 4 × 400 m relay team.

== Results ==
=== Men ===
Event	Gold		Silver		Bronze	
60 metres	Hassan Taftian (IRI)	6.56 CR	Reza Ghasemi (IRI)	6.66	Eric Cray (PHI)	6.70
400 metres	Abdelalelah Haroun (QAT)	45.88 CR	Abubakar Abbas (BHR)	46.60	Mikhail Litvin (KAZ)	46.80
800 metres	Musaeb Abdulrahman Balla (QAT)	1:46.92 CR	Jamal Hairane (QAT)	1:48.05	Mostafa Ebrahimi (IRI)	1:48.26
1500 metres	Mohamad Al-Garni (QAT)	3:36.35 CR	Benson Seurei (BHR)	3:37.08	Said Aden Said (QAT)	3:37.29
3000 metres	Mohamad Al-Garni (QAT)	7:39.23 CR	Albert Kibichii Rop (BHR)	7:40.27	Said Aden Said (QAT)	7:44.69
60 metres hurdles	Abdulaziz Al-Mandeel (KUW)	7.60 CR NR	Yaqoub Mohamed Al-Youha (KUW)	7.65	Zhang Honglin (CHN)	7.73
4 × 400 m relay	Qatar; Mohamed Nasir Abbas; Abubaker Haydar Abdalla; Musaeb Abdulrahman Balla; Abdelalelah Haroun	3:08.20 CR	Iran; Reza Ghasemi; Mehdi Zamani; Mostafa Ebrahimi; Sajjad Hashemi	3:11.86	Only two starters	
High jump	Mutaz Essa Barshim (QAT)	2.35 m	Majd Eddin Ghazal (SYR)	2.28 m	Manjula Kumara (SRI)	2.24 m NR
Pole vault	Huang Bokai (CHN)	5.75 m CR	Seito Yamamoto (JPN)	5.60 m	Hiroki Ogita (JPN)	5.50 m
Long jump	Zhang Yaoguang (CHN)	7.99 m	Kumaravel Premkumar (IND)	7.92 m	Chan Ming Tai (HKG)	7.85 m
Triple jump	Roman Valiyev (KAZ)	16.69 m	Renjith Maheshwary (IND)	16.16 m	Rashid Al-Mannai (QAT)	15.97 m
Shot put	Liu Yang (CHN)	19.30 m	Tian Zhizhong (CHN)	18.88 m	Om Prakash Karhana (IND)	18.77 m
Heptathlon	Akihiko Nakamura (JPN)	5831 pts NR	Hu Yufei (CHN)	5745 pts	Marat Khaydarov (UZB)	5619 pts

=== Women ===
Event	Gold		Silver		Bronze	
60 metres	Viktoriya Zyabkina (KAZ)	7.27 CR	Yuan Qiqi (CHN)	7.33	Dutee Chand (IND)	7.37
400 metres	Kemi Adekoya (BHR)	51.67 AR CR	Elina Mikhina (KAZ)	53.85	Quách Thị Lan (VIE)	55.69
800 metres	Marta Hirpato Yota (BHR)	2:04.59	Nimali Liyanarachchi (SRI)	2:04.88	Tatyana Neroznak (KAZ)	2:06.32
1500 metres	Betlhem Desalegn (UAE)	4:21.65	Tigist Belay (BHR)	4:22.17	Sugandha Kumari (IND)	4;29.06
3000 metres	Betlhem Desalegn (UAE)	8:44.59	Ruth Jebet (BHR)	8:47.24	Alia Saeed Mohammed (UAE)	8:48.62
60 metres hurdles	Anastasiya Soprunova (KAZ)	8.17	Anastasiya Pilipenko (KAZ)	8.17	Valentina Kibalnikova (UZB)	8.32
4 × 400 m relay	Bahrain; Salwa Eid Naser; Uwaseun Yusuf Jamal; Iman Isa Jassim; Kemi Adekoya	3:35.07 AR	Iran; Farzaneh Fasihi; Elnaz Kompani; Sepideh Tavakkoli; Maryam Tousi	4:06.51	Jordan; Farah Rasem Yacoub Hashem; Khattab Omar Boshnak; Sulaiman Maradat; Abdelqader Alqadi	4:10.55
High jump	Svetlana Radzivil (UZB)	1.92 m	Nadiya Dusanova (UZB)	1.88 m	Zheng Xingjuan (CHN)	1.84 m
Pole vault	Li Ling (CHN)	4.70 m AR CR	Ren Mengqian (CHN)	4.30 m	Tomomi Abiko (JPN)	4.15 m
Long jump	Mayookha Johny (IND)	6.35 m	Bui Thi Thu Thao (VIE)	6.30 m	Olga Rypakova (KAZ)	6.22 m
Triple jump	Olga Rypakova (KAZ)	14.32 m CR	Mayookha Johny (IND)	14.00 m NR	Irina Ektova (KAZ)	13.48 m
Shot put	Geng Shuang (CHN)	18.06 m	Guo Tianqian (CHN)	17.44 m	Noora Jasim (BHR)	16.26 m
Pentathlon	Ekaterina Voronina (UZB)	4224 pts	Sepideh Tavakkoli (IRI)	3828 pts	Chie Kiriyama (JPN)	3637 pts

== Medal table ==
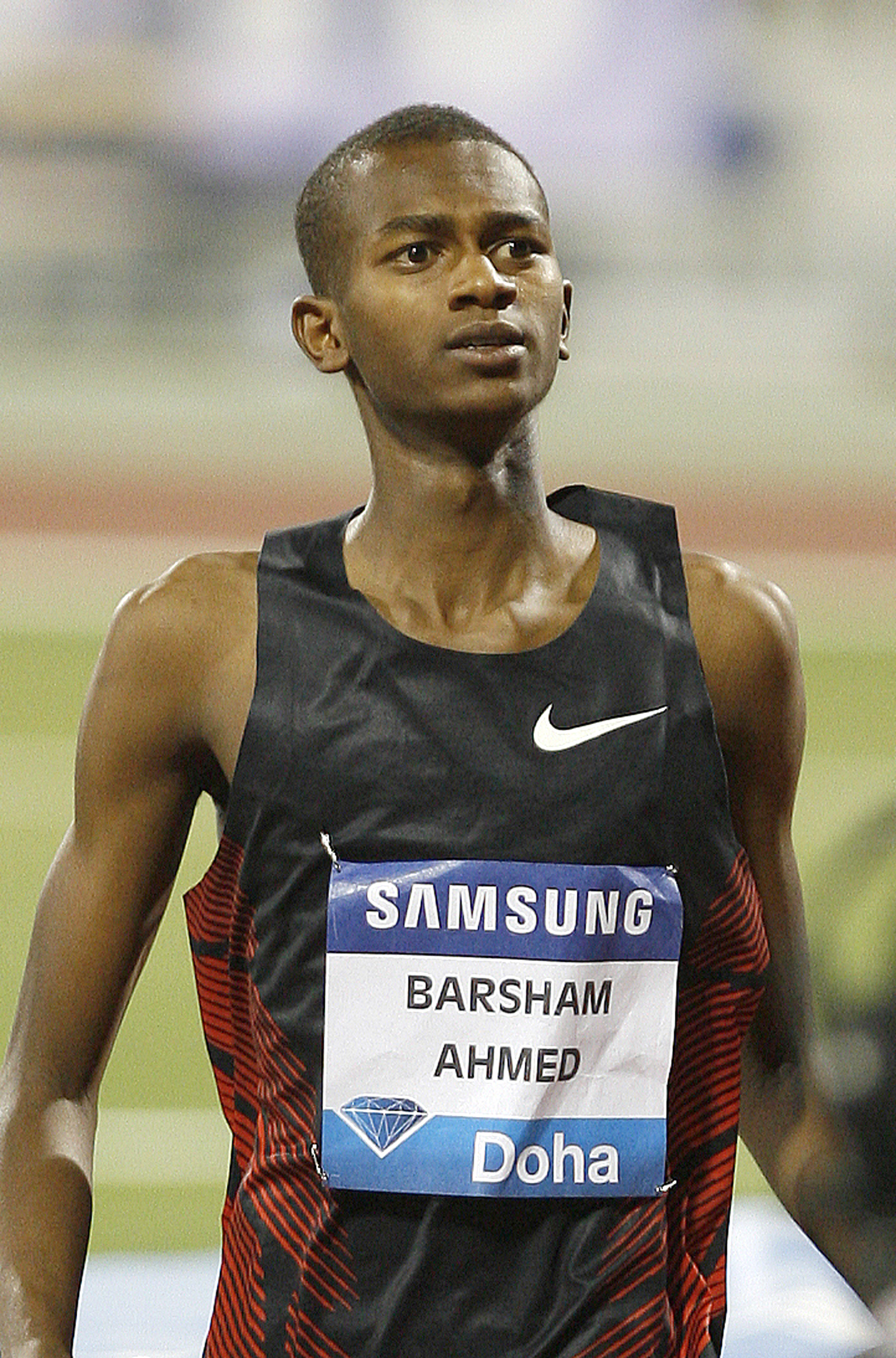
Mutaz Essa Barshim's fourth straight gold medal helped Qatar top the medal table.

Key

The host country is highlighted in lavender blue

Rank	Nation	Gold	Silver	Bronze	Total
1	Qatar*	6	1	3	10
2	China	5	5	2	12
3	Kazakhstan	4	2	4	10
4	Bahrain	3	5	1	9
5	Uzbekistan	2	1	2	5
6	United Arab Emirates	2	0	1	3
7	Iran	1	4	1	6
8	India	1	3	3	7
9	Japan	1	1	3	5
10	Kuwait	1	1	0	2
11	Sri Lanka	0	1	1	2
11	Vietnam	0	1	1	2
13	Syria	0	1	0	1
14	Hong Kong	0	0	1	1
14	Jordan	0	0	1	1
14	Philippines	0	0	1	1
Totals (16 entries)		26	26	25	77

== Participating nations ==
- Afghanistan (1)
- Bahrain (17)
- China (22)
- Chinese Taipei (2)
- Hong Kong (7)
- India (18)
- Indonesia (4)
- Iran (19)
- Iraq (10)
- Japan (12)
- Jordan (5)
- Kazakhstan (15)
- Kuwait (8)
- Kyrgyzstan (5)
- Lebanon (6)
- Macau (5)
- Malaysia (11)
- Maldives (3)
- Mongolia (1)
- Oman (4)
- Pakistan (4)
- Palestine (2)
- Philippines (7)
- Qatar (21)
- Saudi Arabia (8)
- Singapore (6)
- South Korea (3)
- Sri Lanka (5)
- Syria (2)
- Tajikistan (4)
- Thailand (1)
- Turkmenistan (5)
- United Arab Emirates (5)
- Uzbekistan (11)
- Vietnam (4)
- Yemen (4)
