= List of Indian records in athletics =

The following are the national records in athletics in India. Some of the records are maintained by Athletics Federation of India (AFI). Outdoor times for track races between 200 meters to 10,000 meters are set on 400-meter unbanked tracks. Indoor marks are established on 200-meter tracks, whether banked or unbanked. Indoor tracks longer than 200 meters are considered "oversized" and times are not accepted for record purposes.

Key to tables: Awaiting ratification Record not kept by AFI Not ratified or later rescinded by AFI

== Outdoor ==
=== Men ===
Event	Record	Athlete	Date	Meet	Place	Ref.
Track Events
100 m	10.09 (+0.3 m/s)	Gurindervir Singh	23 May 2026	29th National Senior Athletics Federation Competition	Ranchi, India	
200 m	20.32 (+0.8 m/s)	Animesh Kujur	31 May 2025	Asian Championships	Gumi, South Korea	
300 m	32.41	Muhammed Anas	17 August 2019	Rieter Athletics Meeting	Ústí nad Orlicí, Czech Republic	
400 m	44.98	Vishal Thennarasu Kayalvizhi	23 May 2026	29th National Senior Athletics Federation Competition	Ranchi, India	
800 m	1:44.93	Mohammed Afsal	5 July 2025	Memoriał Czesława Cybulskiego	Poznań, Poland	
1500 m	3:35.24	Jinson Johnson	1 September 2019	ISTAF Berlin	Berlin, Germany	
3000 m	7:34.49	Gulveer Singh	12 August 2025	Gyulai István Memorial	Budapest, Hungary	
5000 m	13:11.82 (Note: Outdoor best; indoor mark ratified as absolute record.)	Gulveer Singh	28 September 2024	Yogibo Athletics Challenge Cup	Niigata, Japan	
5000 m	13:03.93	Gulveer Singh	23 May 2026	LA Track Festival	Los Angeles, United States	
10,000 m	27:00.22	Gulveer Singh	29 March 2025	The TEN	San Juan Capistrano, United States	
100 km (track)	7:32:43 h	Amar Singh Devanda	13–14 March 2021	Tuffman 24 Hour Stadium Run	Chandigarh, India	
12 hours	140.00 km	Dhananjay Sharma	18 December 2022	Tuffman 12 Hour Stadium Run	Gurugram, India	
24 hours	222.24 km	Binay Kumar	9–10 March 2019	Tuffman 24 Hour Stadium Run	Chandigarh, India	
110 m hurdles	13.27 (+1.6 m/s)	Tejas Shirse	13 June 2026	India Athletics Series 9	Ludhiana, India	
400 m hurdles	48.80	Dharun Ayyasamy	16 March 2019	Federation Cup	Patiala, India	
2000 m steeplechase	5:49.23	Atul Gamit	6 November 2019	Indian U18 Championships	Mangalagiri, India	
3000 m steeplechase	8:09.91	Avinash Sable	7 July 2024	Meeting de Paris	Paris, France	
5000 m walk	19:23.53+	Sandeep Kumar	7 August 2022	Commonwealth Games	Birmingham, United Kingdom	
10,000 m walk	38:49.21	Sandeep Kumar	7 August 2022	Commonwealth Games	Birmingham, United Kingdom	
20,000 m walk	1:20:22.52	Gurmeet Singh	3 February 2012	All-India Railway Championships	Bhubaneswar, India	
4 × 100 m relay	38.69	India; Gurindervir Singh; Amlan Borgohain; Animesh Kujur; Manikanta Hoblidhar	30 April 2025	National Relay Carnival	Chandigarh, India	
4 × 400 m relay	2:59.05	India; Muhammed Anas; Amoj Jacob; Muhammad Ajmal Variyathodi; Rajesh Ramesh	26 August 2023	World Championships	Budapest, Hungary	
Road Events
5 km	13:58+	Gulveer Singh	15 March 2026	New York City Half Marathon	New York City, United States	
10 km	27:57+	Gulveer Singh	15 March 2026	New York City Half Marathon	New York City, United States	
15 km	42:25+	Gulveer Singh	15 March 2026	New York City Half Marathon	New York City, United States	
20 km	56:38+ a (Note: point-to-point course, not record eligible)	Gulveer Singh	15 March 2026	New York City Half Marathon	New York City, United States	
Half marathon	1:00:30	Avinash Sable	29 November 2020	Delhi Half Marathon	New Delhi, India	
Half marathon	59:42 a (Note: point-to-point course, not record eligible)	Gulveer Singh	15 March 2026	New York City Half Marathon	New York City, United States	
25 km	1:12:06	Gulveer Singh	21 December 2025	Tata Steel World 25K	Kolkata, India	
30 km	1:31:46+	Sawan Barwal	12 April 2026	Rotterdam Marathon	Rotterdam, Netherlands	
Marathon	2:11:37	Sawan Barwal	26 September 2026	Asian Games	Nagoya, Japan	
90 km	7:30:17 (90.184 km)	Sandeep Kumar	23 June 2018	Comrades Ultra Marathon Run	Durban, South Africa	
100 km	6:59:37	Amar Singh Devanda	23 November 2024	IAU 100 km Asia and Oceania Championships	Bangkok, Thailand	
24 hours	265.198 km	Geeno Antony	18–19 October 2025	IAU 24 Hour World Championship	Albi, France	
10 km walk	39:25	Sahil	31 January 2024	11th National Open Competition	Chandigarh, India	
15 km walk	1:00:00+	Akshdeep Singh	19 March 2023	Asian Race Walking Championships	Nomi, Japan	
20 km walk	1:19:38	Akshdeep Singh	30 January 2024	National Race Walking Championships	Chandigarh, India	
35 km walk (road)	2:29:56	Ram Baboo	25 March 2023	Dudinská Päťdesiatka	Dudince, Slovakia	
50 km walk	3:56:00 (Note: By federation source; 3:55:59 by World Athletics source.)	Sandeep Kumar	18 February 2017	Indian Racewalking Championships	New Delhi, India	
Field Events
High jump	2.31 m	Sarvesh Kushare	27 June 2026	65th National Inter-State Senior Championships	Bhubaneswar, India	
Pole vault	5.50 m	Dev Meena	29 September 2026	Asian Games	Aichi-Nagoya, Japan	
Long jump	8.42 m (+1.8 m/s)	Jeswin Aldrin	2 March 2023	2nd Indian Open Jumps Competition	Vijayanagar, India	
Triple jump	17.37 m (−1.5 m/s)	Praveen Chithravel	6 May 2023	V Prueba de Confrontación	Havana, Cuba	
Shot put	21.77 m	Tajinderpal Singh Toor	19 June 2023	Inter-State Championships	Bhubaneswar, India	
Discus throw	66.28 m	Vikas Gowda	12 April 2012	Old Style Discus Challenge	Norman, United States	
Hammer throw	70.73 m	Neeraj Kumar	29 June 2016	National Interstate Championships	Hyderabad, India	
Hammer throw	71.02 m	Nirbhay Choudhary	10 September 2026	Indian Athletics Final Series	New Delhi, India	
Javelin throw	90.23 m	Neeraj Chopra	16 May 2025	Doha Diamond League	Doha, Qatar	
Combined Events
Decathlon	8057 pts NWI	Tejaswin Shankar	22–23 May 2026	29th National Senior Athletics Federation Competition	Ranchi, India	
Decathlon	100m (wind) / Long jump (wind) / Shot put / High jump / 400m / 110m H (wind) / Discus / Pole vault / Javelin / 1500m; 10.77 (NWI) / 7.67 m (NWI) / 13.31 m / 2.25 m / 48.29 / 14.23 (NWI) / 37.90 m / 4.20 m / 47.71 m / 4:29.02					

=== Women ===
Event	Record	Athlete	Date	Meet	Place	Ref.
Track Events
100 m	11.17 (±0.0 m/s)	Dutee Chand	21 June 2021	Indian Grand Prix 4	Patiala, India	
200 m	22.82 (+0.8 m/s)	Saraswati Saha	28 August 2002	National Circuit Meet	Ludhiana, India	
300 m	37.25	Hima Das	17 August 2019	Rieter atletický mítink	Ústí nad Orlicí, Czech Republic	
400 m	50.79	Hima Das	26 August 2018	Asian Games	Jakarta, Indonesia	
800 m	1:59.17	Tintu Luka	4 September 2010	Continental Cup	Split, Croatia	
1500 m	4:04.78	K. M. Deeksha	11 May 2024	Sound Running Track Fest	Los Angeles, United States	
3000 m	8:57.19	Parul Chaudhary	2 July 2022	Sound Running Sunset Tour	Los Angeles, United States	
5000 m	15:04.26	Parul Chaudhary	13 June 2026	Meeting Nikaïa	Nice, France	
10,000 m	31:50.47	Preeja Sreedharan	21 November 2010	Asian Games	Guangzhou, China	
12 hours	111.78 km	Ashwini G	2 February 2020	Tuffman 24 Hour Stadium Run	Chandigarh, India	
24 hours	186.90 km	Meenal Kotak	11–12 February 2023	Tuffman 24 Hour Stadium Run	Chandigarh, India	
100 m hurdles	12.78 (+1.0 m/s)	Jyothi Yarraji	4 August 2023	Summer World University Games	Chengdu, China	
400 m hurdles	54.75	Vithya Ramraj	28 September 2026	Asian Games	Aichi-Nagoya, Japan	
2000 m steeplechase	6:13.92	Ankita Dhyani	14 August 2025	Grand Slam Jerusalem	Jerusalem, Israel	
3000 m steeplechase	9:08.67	Parul Chaudhary	27 September 2026	Asian Games	Gumi, South Korea	
5000 m walk	22:05.75	Khushbir Kaur	19 January 2015	All India Inter-University Championships	Moodabidri, India	
10,000 m walk	43:38.83	Priyanka Goswami	6 August 2022	Commonwealth Games	Birmingham, United Kingdom	
20,000 m walk	1:36:16.87	Bhawna Jat	22 August 2019	All-India Railway Championships	Pune, India	
4 × 100 m relay	43.37	India; Dutee Chand; Hima Das; Archana Suseendran; S Dhanalakshmi	21 June 2021	Indian Grand Prix 4	Patiala, India	
4 × 400 m relay	3:26.89	India; Rajwinder Kaur; K. M. Beenamol; Chitra K. Soman; Manjit Kaur	27 August 2004	Olympic Games	Athens, Greece	
Road Events
10 km	34:14	Lalita Babar	28 November 2010	Hyderabad 10 km	Hyderabad, India	
Half marathon	1:10:31	Suriya Loganathan	19 November 2017	Delhi Half Marathon	New Delhi, India	
25 km	1:26:04	Seema	21 December 2025	Tata Steel World 25K	Kolkata, India	
Marathon	2:34:43	O. P. Jaisha	30 August 2015	World Championships	Beijing, China	
5 km walk	24:16	Amandeep Kaur	9 May 2004	World Athletics Day	Patiala, India	
10 km walk	43:31+	Priyanka Goswami	13 February 2021	National Race Walking Championships	Ranchi, India	
20 km walk	1:28:45	Priyanka Goswami	13 February 2021	National Race Walking Championships	Ranchi, India	
30 km walk (road)	2:26:54	Priyanka Goswami	18 May 2025	Athletics Victoria Walking Championships	Melbourne, Australia	
35 km walk (road)	2:56:34	Priyanka Goswami	22 March 2025	Dudinska 50	Dudince, Slovakia	
Field Events
High jump	1.93 m	Pooja Singh	29 May 2026	Asian U20 Championships	Hong Kong, China	
Pole vault	4.25 m	G. Sindhushree	25 June 2026	65th National Inter-State Senior Championships	Bhubaneswar, India	
Long jump	6.88 m (+0.7 m/s)	Ancy Sojan	27 June 2026	65th National Inter-State Senior Championships	Bhubaneswar, India	
Triple jump	14.11 m (+0.9 m/s)	Mayookha Johny	9 July 2011	Asian Championships	Kobe, Japan	
Shot put	18.41 m	Abha Khatua	13 May 2024	Federation Cup	Bhubaneswar, India	
Discus throw	66.59 m	Kamalpreet Kaur	21 June 2021	Indian Grand Prix 4	Patiala, India	
Hammer throw	67.02 m	Anushka Yadav	24 June 2026	65th National InterState Senior Championships	Bhubaneswar, India	
Hammer throw	68.35 m	Tanya Chaudhary	10 September 2026	Indian Athletics Final Series	New Delhi, India	
Javelin throw	63.82 m	Annu Rani	8 May 2022	4th Indian Open Javelin Throw Competition	Jamshedpur, India	
Combined Events
Heptathlon	6211 pts	J. J. Shobha	16–17 March 2004	Federation Cup National Championships	New Delhi, India	
Heptathlon	100m H (wind) / High jump / Shot put / 200m (wind) / Long jump (wind) / Javelin / 800m; 13.71 / 1.69 m / 12.52 m / 23.53 / 6.50 m / 44.16 m / 2:16.40					

=== Mixed ===
Event	Record	Athlete	Date	Meet	Place	Ref.
4 x 100 m relay	41.06	India; Gurindervir Singh; Harita Badra; Animesh Kujur; Sneha Sathyanarayana	29 September 2026	Asian Games	Aichi-Nagoya, Japan	
4 × 400 m relay	3:12.87	India; Muhammad Anas; Jyothika Sri Dandi; Muhammad Ajmal Variyathodi; Kiran Pahal	30 June 2024	National Inter-State Athletics Championships	Panchkula, India	

== Indoor ==
=== Men ===
Event	Record	Athlete	Date	Meet	Place	Ref.
50 m	5.80	Rajeev Balakrishnan	19 February 2000		Los Angeles, United States	
55 m	6.33 A	Rajeev Balakrishnan	29 January 2000		Reno, United States	
60 m	6.60	Gurindervir Singh	25 March 2026	Indian Championships	Bhubaneswar, India	
200 m
200 m	22.32	Vivaswan R Shetty	19 February 2011	Simplot Games	Idaho, United States	
200 m	24.00	Abhijit Shirshikar	12 February 2012	Piirikunnalinen Hallikisa	Helsinki, Finland	
200 m	25.13	Sunil Bredeka	5 February 2011	National Meeting	Magglingen, Switzerland	
200 m	23.54	Karthik Saravanan	14 January 2022		Eaubonne, France	
400 m	47.33	Amoj Jacob	19 September 2017	Asian Indoor and Martial Arts Games	Ashgabat, Turkmenistan	
600 m	1:17.71	Pradeep Senthil Kumar	25 January 2025	Mark Colligan Memorial	Lincoln, United States	
800 m	1:47.86	Mohammed Afsal	24 March 2026	Indian Championships	Bhubaneswar, India	
1500 m	3:41.18	Chatholi Hamza	15 February 2008	Asian Championships	Doha, Qatar	
Mile	3:55.41	Parvej Khan	16 February 2024	Boston University DMR Challenge	Boston, United States	
3000 m	7:38.26	Gulveer Singh	14 February 2025	BU David Hemery Valentine Invitational	Boston, United States	
5000 m	12:59.77	Gulveer Singh	21 February 2025	BU Terrier DMR Challenge	Boston, United States	
Marathon	3:13:19	Lokesh Kumar Meena	24 June 2018	Grant-Pierce Indoor Marathon	Arlington, United States	
60 m hurdles	7.64	Tejas Shrise	31 January 2025	Elite Track Miramas Meeting	Miramas, France	
60 m hurdles	7.64	Tejas Shrise	2 February 2025	Meeting de L'Eure	Val-de-Reuil, France	
60 m hurdles	7.64 A	Madhvendra Shekhawat	1 March 2025	Big Sky Championships	Flagstaff, United States	
High jump	2.28 m	Tejaswin Shankar	24 February 2018	Big 12 Championships	Ames, United States	
High jump	2.28 m	Tejaswin Shankar	23 February 2019	Big 12 Conference Championships	Lubbock, United States	
Pole vault	5.41 m	Kuldeep Kumar	2 May 2026	1st Indian Open Combined Events and Pole Vault Competition	Bhubaneswar, India	
Long jump	7.92 m	Kumaravel Premkumar	21 February 2016	Asian Championships	Doha, Qatar	
Long jump	7.92 m	Murali Sreeshankar	18 March 2022	World Championships	Belgrade, Serbia	
Long jump	7.93 m	Jeswin Aldrin	10 February 2023	Asian Championships	Astana, Kazakhstan	
Long jump	7.97 m	Jeswin Aldrin	12 February 2023	Asian Championships	Astana, Kazakhstan	
Long jump	8.01 m	Lokesh Sathyanathan	13 February 2026	Tyson Invitational	Fayetteville, United States	
Long jump	8.21 m	Lokesh Sathyanathan	13 March 2026	NCAA Division I Championships	Fayetteville, United States	
Triple jump	16.24 m	Amarjeet Singh	15 February 2008	Asian Indoor Championships	Doha, Qatar	
Triple jump	16.98 m	Praveen Chithravel	10 February 2023	Asian Championships	Astana, Kazakhstan	
Shot put	19.60 m	Vikas Gowda	19 February 2005		Chapel Hill, United States	
Shot put	19.72 m	Tajinderpal Singh Toor	17 February 2024	Asian Championships	Tehran, Iran	
Shot put	20.05 m	Tajinderpal Singh Toor	8 February 2026	Asian Championships	Tianjin, China	
Heptathlon	5993 pts	Tejaswin Shankar	7–8 February 2026	Asian Championships	Tianjin, China	
Heptathlon	60m / Long jump / Shot put / High jump / 60m H / Pole vault / 1000m; 7.11 / 7.53 m / 13.63 m / 2.23 m / 8.02 / 4.20 m / 2:43.91					
5000 m walk	22:22.92	Basat Sita Ram	8 February 2004	Asian Championships	Tehran, Iran	
4 × 400 m relay	3:13.01	India; Jayakumar; P. Kumar; N. Kumar; Sreejith	2 November 2009	Asian Indoor Games	Hanoi, Vietnam	

=== Women ===
Event	Record	Athlete	Date	Meet	Place	Ref.
60 m	7.28	Dutee Chand	19 February 2016	Asian Championships	Doha, Qatar	
200 m	25.35	Nirupama Sunderraj	25 February 2012		Cedar Falls, United States	
200 m	25.28 OT	Nirupama Sunderraj	11 February 2012		Ames, United States	
400 m	53.89	Pinki Paramanik	13 November 2005	Asian Indoor Games	Pattaya, Thailand	
800 m	2:03.43	Sinimol Paulose	16 February 2008	Asian Championships	Doha, Qatar	
1500 m	4:15.42	Sinimol Paulose	14 February 2008	Asian Championships	Doha, Qatar	
3000 m	9:09.81	Suriya Loganathan	19 February 2012	Asian Championships	Hangzhou, China	
60 m hurdles	8.34	Gayathri Govindaraj	21 February 2016	Asian Championships	Doha, Qatar	
60 m hurdles	8.20	Jyothi Yarraji	25 January 2023	Aarhus SPRINT'n'JUMP	Aarhus, Denmark	
60 m hurdles	8.18	Jyothi Yarraji	3 February 2023	Elite Indoor Track Miramas meeting	Miramas, France	
60 m hurdles	8.17	Jyothi Yarraji	3 February 2023	Elite Indoor Track Miramas meeting	Miramas, France	
60 m hurdles	8.16	Jyothi Yarraji	11 February 2023	Asian Championships	Astana, Kazakhstan	
60 m hurdles	8.13	Jyothi Yarraji	12 February 2023	Asian Championships	Astana, Kazakhstan	
60 m hurdles	8.12	Jyothi Yarraji	17 February 2024	Asian Championships	Tehran, Iran	
60 m hurdles	8.04 Mx	Jyothi Yarraji	4 February 2024		Bhubaneswar, India	
High jump	1.84 m	Bobby Aloysius	14 February 2004	AVIVA Indoor Grand Prix	Birmingham, United Kingdom	
High jump	1.87 m	Pooja Singh	8 February 2026	Asian Championships	Tianjin, China	
Pole vault	4.23 m	Baranica Elangovan	3 May 2026	1st Open Combined Events and Pole Vault Competition	Bhubaneswar, India	
Long jump	6.44 m	Mayookha Johny	11 February 2012	International Sparkasse Springer-Hallenmeeting	Ludwigshafen, Germany	
Long jump	6.47 m	Pavana Nagaraj	16 January 2026	Owen Hewitt Invitational	Norman, United States	
Triple jump	14.00 m	Mayookha Johny	20 February 2016	Asian Championships	Doha, Qatar	
Shot put	15.21 m	Manpreet Kaur	19 February 2018		Doha, Qatar	
Shot put	16.63 m A	Krishna Jayasankar Menon	31 January 2026	New Mexico Open	Albuquerque, United States	
Pentathlon	4119 pts	Swapna Barman	10 February 2023	Asian Championships	Astana, Kazakhstan	
Pentathlon	60m H / High jump / Shot put / Long jump / 800m; 8.64 / 1.75 m / 12.13 m / 5.91 m / 2:27.57					
3000 m walk	14:54.15	Jasmin Kaur	6 February 2004	Asian Championships	Tehran, Iran	
4 × 400 m relay	3:37.46	India; Mandeep Kaur; Manjeet Kaur; Sini Jose; Chitra K. Soman	16 February 2008	Asian Championships	Doha, Qatar	

== Cross country ==
Event	Record	Athlete	Date	Meet	Place	Ref.
Men
Cross country running	36:49 (12.2 km)	Vijay Kumar Mishra	25 March 1990	IAAF World Cross Country Championships	Aix-les-Bains, France	
Cross country running	39:22 (12.33 km)	Bhairav Singh	23 March 1997	IAAF World Cross Country Championships	Turin, Italy	
Cross country running	42:12 (12.53 km)	Madan Singh	21 March 1992	IAAF World Cross Country Championships	Boston, United States	
Women
Cross country running	30.00 (8.08 km)	Aruna Devi Waishram	18 March 2000	IAAF World Cross Country Championships	Vilamoura, Portugal	
Cross country running	23.31 (6.425 km)	Poonam Taneja	24 March 1991	IAAF World Cross Country Championships	Antwerp, Belgium	
Cross country running	18.49 (5.05 km)	Suman Rawat	22 March 1987	IAAF World Cross Country Championships	Warsaw, Poland	
