= List of Bahraini records in athletics =

The following are the national records in athletics in Bahrain maintained by Bahrain Athletics Association (BAA).

== Outdoor ==
Key to tables: Awaiting ratification Record not kept by BAA

=== Men ===
Event	Record	Athlete	Date	Meet	Place	Ref.
100 m	10.03 (+0.9 m/s)	Kemarley Brown	7 May 2016	Kingston Invitational	Kingston, Jamaica	
200 m	20.19 (+0.3 m/s)	Mohamed Salem Eid Yaqoob	16 August 2016	Olympic Games	Rio de Janeiro, Brazil	
300 m	33.10	Saad Mubarek Salem	3 March 2018	National Elite Meeting	Riffa, Bahrain	
400 m	44.36	Ali Khamis	14 August 2016	Olympic Games	Rio de Janeiro, Brazil	
800 m	1:42.79	Yusuf Saad Kamel	29 July 2008	Herculis	Fontvieille, Monaco	
1000 m	2:14.72	Yusuf Saad Kamel	22 July 2008	DN Galan	Stockholm, Sweden	
1500 m	3:29.14	Rashid Ramzi	14 July 2006	Golden Gala	Rome, Italy	
Mile	3:51.33	Rashid Ramzi	4 June 2005	Prefontaine Classic	Eugene, United States	
2000 m	5:00.60	Benson Seurei	28 June 2013	Meeting de la Ville de Reims	Reims, France	
3000 m	7:29.60	Birhanu Balew	16 May 2026	Shanghai Diamond League	Shaoxing/Keqiao, China	
Two miles	8:13.16	Rashid Ramzi	8 June 2008	Prefontaine Classic	Eugene, United States	
5000 m	12:45.70	Birhanu Balew	5 September 2026	Memorial van Damme	Brussels, Belgium	
5 km (road)	13:05	Birhanu Balew	9 December 2023	Annual Charity Run	Khobar, Saudi Arabia	
10,000 m	27:07.49	Birhanu Balew	19 May 2021	Golden Spike Ostrava	Ostrava, Czech Republic	
10 km (road)	26:54	Birhanu Balew	26 April 2025	Adizero: Road to Records	Herzogenaurach, Germany	
15 km (road)	41:25+	Birhanu Balew	14 February 2026	Ras Al Khaimah Half Marathon	Ras Al Khaimah, United Arab Emirates	
10 miles (road)	46:22	Aweke Ayalew	8 April 2018	Cherry Blossom Ten Mile Run	Washington, D.C., United States	
20 km (road)	55:22+	Birhanu Balew	14 February 2026	Ras Al Khaimah Half Marathon	Ras Al Khaimah, United Arab Emirates	
Half marathon	58:23	Birhanu Balew	14 February 2026	Ras Al Khaimah Half Marathon	Ras Al Khaimah, United Arab Emirates	
25 km (road)	1:14:15+	El Hassan El-Abbassi	2 December 2018	Valencia Marathon	Valencia, Spain	
30 km (road)	1:29:07+	El Hassan El-Abbassi	2 December 2018	Valencia Marathon	Valencia, Spain	
Marathon	2:04:43	El Hassan El-Abbassi	2 December 2018	Valencia Marathon	Valencia, Spain	
110 m hurdles	14.24 (+1.1 m/s)	Ahmed Hamada Jassim	5 November 1983	Asian Championships	Kuwait City, Kuwait	
400 m hurdles	49.31	Ahmed Hamada Jassim	30 September 1986	Asian Games	Seoul, South Korea	
2000 m steeplechase	5:23.95	Tareq Mubarak Taher	15 July 2005	World Youth Championships	Marrakesh, Morocco	
3000 m steeplechase	8:06.13	Tareq Mubarak Taher	13 July 2009	Athens Grand Prix Tsiklitiria	Athens, Greece	
High jump	2.19 m	Salem Nasser Bakheet	10 October 2002	Asian Games	Busan, South Korea	
High jump	2.19 m	Salem Nasser Bakheet	9 December 2006	Asian Games	Doha, Qatar	
Pole vault	4.45 m	Ibrahim Jassim Hussein	16 April 1995		Manama, Bahrain	
Long jump	7.47 m (+0.5 m/s)	Mohamed Imam Bakhash	8 October 2003		Kuwait City, Kuwait	
Long jump	7.47 m NWI	Mohamed Imam Bakhash	16 October 2003		Manama, Bahrain	
Triple jump	16.70 m (−1.4 m/s)	Mohamed Youssef Al-Sahabi	17 April 2009		Manama, Bahrain	
Shot put	21.15 m	Abdelrahman Mahmoud	16 June 2021	Arab Championships	Radès, Tunisia	
Discus throw	55.73 m	Marawan Medany	1 June 2021		Brest, Belarus	
Hammer throw	64.68 m	Mahmoud El-Gohary	18 May 2022	GCC Games	Kuwait City, Kuwait	
Javelin throw	64.38 m	Youssef Ali Boukhamas	2 August 1994		Tallinn, Estonia	
Decathlon	6731 pts h	Adel Abdullah Sherada	21–22 August 1983		Amman, Jordan	
Decathlon	100m (wind) / Long jump (wind) / Shot put / High jump / 400m / 110m H (wind) / Discus / Pole vault / Javelin / 1500m; 11.75 / 6.73 m / 12.57 m / 1.89 m / 51.65 / 16.1 / 39.66 m / 3.90 m / 55.46 m / 4:56.28					
20 km walk (road)	2:13:24	Rashid Dawass	4 March 1982		Doha, Qatar	
50 km walk (road)						
4 × 100 m relay	39.55	Bahrain; Saeed Alkhadli; Salem Eid Yaqoob; Moussa Ali Issa; Andrew Fisher	19 May 2017	Islamic Solidarity Games	Baku, Azerbaijan	
4 × 100 m relay	39.01	Bahrain; Ebrahim Simon Omar; Rashid Abdulraof; Yaqoob Salem Yaqoob; Saeed Al-Khardi	12 August 2022	Islamic Solidarity Games	Konya, Turkey	
4 × 400 m relay	3:03.97	Bahrain; Musa Isah; Ali Khamis; Abdulrahman Khamis; Abbas Abubakar Abbas	30 August 2018	Asian Games	Jakarta, Indonesia	

=== Women ===
Event	Record	Athlete	Date	Meet	Place	Ref.
100 m	11.05 (+0.9 m/s)	Ofonime Odiong	14 May 2022	ACC Championships	Durham, United States	
200 m	22.51 (+1.9 m/s)	Salwa Eid Naser	30 June 2019	Prefontaine Classic	Palo Alto, United States	
300 m	35.85	Salwa Eid Naser	9 August 2025	Mityng Ambasadorów Białostockiego Sportu	Białystok, Poland	
400 m	48.14	Salwa Eid Naser	3 October 2019	World Championships	Doha, Qatar	
600 m	1:24.94	Nelly Jepkosgei	1 September 2024	ISTAF Berlin	Berlin, Germany	
800 m	1:57.80	Maryam Yusuf Jamal	29 August 2008	Weltklasse Zürich	Zürich, Switzerland	
1500 m	3:56.18	Maryam Yusuf Jamal	27 August 2006	IAAF Grand Prix	Rieti, Italy	
Mile	4:17.75	Maryam Yusuf Jamal	14 September 2007	Memorial Van Damme	Brussels, Belgium	
2000 m	5:31.88	Maryam Yusuf Jamal	7 June 2009	Prefontaine Classic	Eugene, United States	
3000 m	8:28.87	Maryam Yusuf Jamal	29 July 2005	Bislett Games	Oslo, Norway	
Two miles	9:13.85	Mimi Belete	31 May 2014	Prefontaine Classic	Eugene, United States	
5000 m	14:30.06	Winfred Yavi	4 June 2026	Golden Gala Pietro Mennea	Roma, Italy	
5 km (road)	14:53+	Violah Jepchumba	1 April 2017	Prague Half Marathon	Prague, Czech Republic	
10,000 m	29:50.77	Kalkidan Gezahegne	8 May 2021	Gold Gala Fernanda Ribeiro	Maia, Portugal	
10 km (road)	29:38 Mx	Kalkidan Gezahegne	3 October 2021	The Giants Geneva	Geneva, Switzerland	
15 km (road)	45:40+	Violah Jepchumba	1 April 2017	Prague Half Marathon	Prague, Czech Republic	
10 miles (road)	52:34	Tejitu Daba	18 September 2016	Dam tot Damloop	Amsterdam, Netherlands	
20 km (road)	1:01:50+	Violah Jepchumba	1 April 2017	Prague Half Marathon	Prague, Czech Republic	
Half marathon	1:05:22	Violah Jepchumba	1 April 2017	Prague Half Marathon	Prague, Czech Republic	
25 km (road)	1:21:04	Desi Mokonin	18 December 2022	Kolkata 25K	Kolkata, India	
30 km (road)	1:40:41+	Eunice Kirwa	12 March 2017	Nagoya Women's Marathon	Nagoya, Japan	
Marathon	2:20:02	Eunice Chumba	17 April 2022	Seoul Marathon	Seoul, South Korea	
100 m hurdles	13.34 (+1.8 m/s)	Fatmata Fofanah	4 July 2009	Cork City Sports	Cork, Ireland	
400 m hurdles	53.09	Kemi Adekoya	24 August 2023	World Championships	Budapest, Hungary	
Mile steeplechase	4:40.13 WB	Winfred Yavi	22 August 2025	Memorial Van Damme	Brussels, Belgium	
2000 m steeplechase	5:54.16+	Ruth Jebet	27 August 2016	Meeting Areva	Saint-Denis, France	
3000 m steeplechase	8:44.39	Winfred Yavi	30 August 2024	Golden Gala	Roma, Italy	
High jump	1.70 m	Mariam Mohamed Al-Ansari	17 December 2011	Pan Arab Games	Doha, Qatar	
High jump	1.70 m	Mariam Mohamed Al-Ansari	9 March 2013		Manama, Bahrain	
High jump	1.70 m	Mariam Mohamed Al-Ansari	15 March 2015	4th GCC Women's Games	Muscat, Oman	
Pole vault						
Long jump	6.09 m (+0.2 m/s)	Fatima Moubarak	4 July 2023	Arab Games	Oran, Algeria	
Triple jump	13.32 m (+1.9 m/s)	Mary Amiata Otuaruah	27 April 2015	Arab Championships	Manama, Bahrain	
Shot put	18.00 m	Noora Salem Jasim	21 April 2019	Asian Championships	Doha, Qatar	
Discus throw	51.19 m	Noora Salem Jasim	30 August 2018	Asian Games	Jakarta, Indonesia	
Hammer throw	35.50 m	Fatima Ibrahim Namshan	18 September 2002	Arab Junior Championships	Cairo, Egypt	
Javelin throw	36.72 m (Note: record set during heptathlon competition)	Kemi Francis	22 May 2013		Doha, Qatar	
Heptathlon	4620 pts	Kemi Francis	22 May 2013		Doha, Qatar	
Heptathlon	100m H (wind) / High jump / Shot put / 200m (wind) / Long jump (wind) / Javelin / 800m; 15.99 (−1.4 m/s) / 1.51 m / 9.41 m / 25.73 (−1.2 m/s) / 5.25 m / 36.72 m / 2:27.16					
20 km walk (road)						
50 km walk (road)						
4 × 100 m relay	42.73	Bahrain; Iman Essa Jasim; Edidiong Odiong; Hajar Alkhaldi; Salwa Eid Naser	30 August 2018	Asian Games	Jakarta, Indonesia	
4 × 400 m relay	3:30.61	Bahrain; Aminat Yusuf Jamal; Iman Essa Jasim; Edidiong Odiong; Salwa Eid Naser	30 August 2018	Asian Games	Jakarta, Indonesia	
4 × 400 m relay	3:27.65	Bahrain; Muna Saad Mubarak; Oluwakemi Mujidat Adekoya; Zenab Moussa Ali Mahamat; Salwa Eid Naser	4 October 2023	Asian Games	Hangzhou, China	

=== Mixed ===
Event	Record	Athlete	Date	Meet	Place	Ref.
4 × 400 m relay	3:11.82	Bahrain; Musa Isah; Aminat Yusuf Jamal; Salwa Eid Naser; Abbas Abubakar Abbas	29 September 2019	World Championships	Doha, Qatar	

== Indoor ==
=== Men ===
Event	Record	Athlete	Date	Meet	Place	Ref.
60 m	6.57	Andrew Fisher	14 February 2017	Czech Indoor Gala	Ostrava, Czech Republic	
200 m	21.87	Adel Mohamed Farhan	7 February 2004	Asian Championships	Tehran, Iran	
400 m	46.60	Abubaker Abbas	20 February 2016	Asian Championships	Doha, Qatar	
600 m	1:19.10	Mansoor Ali Belal	7 February 2010	Russian Winter Meeting	Moscow, Russia	
800 m	1:45.26	Yusuf Saad Kamel	9 March 2008	World Championships	Valencia, Spain	
1000 m	2:17.06	Belal Mansoor Ali	24 February 2008	Indoor Flanders Meeting	Ghent, Belgium	
1500 m	3:36.28	Belal Mansoor Ali	20 February 2007	GE Galan	Stockholm, Sweden	
2000 m	5:00.34	Birhanu Balew	10 February 2019	Meeting Pas de Calais	Liévin, France	
3000 m	7:31.77	Birhanu Balew	17 February 2022	Meeting Hauts-de-France Pas-de-Calais	Liévin, France	
5000 m	13:09.43	Albert Rop	18 February 2017	Birmingham Indoor Grand Prix	Birmingham, United Kingdom	
60 m hurdles	10.22	Bazar Nawaz Al-Setar	15 February 2008	Asian Championships	Doha, Qatar	
High jump	2.13 m	Salem Nasser Bakheet	10 February 2006	Asian Championships	Pattaya, Thailand	
Pole vault						
Long jump	7.35 m	Mohamed Imam Bakhash	6 February 2004	Asian Championships	Tehran, Iran	
Triple jump	15.97 m	Mohamed Youssef Al-Sahabi	16 February 2014	Asian Championships	Hangzhou, China	
Shot put	21.10 m	Abdelrahman Mahmoud	29 January 2021	Belarusian Cup	Gomel, Belarus	
Heptathlon						
Heptathlon	60m / Long jump / Shot put / High jump / 60m H / Pole vault / 1000m					
5000 m walk						
4 × 400 m relay	3:22.21	Bahrain; Sanad; Farhan; Salem; Kam	8 February 2004	Asian Championships	Tehran, Iran	

=== Women ===
Event	Record	Athlete	Date	Meet	Place	Ref.
60 m	7.32	Ofonime Odiong	29 January 2022		Lubbock, United States	
200 m	23.34	Ofonime Odiong	15 January 2022	Clemson Invitational	Clemson, United States	
400 m	51.45	Kemi Adekoya	19 March 2016	World Championships	Portland, United States	
800 m	2:03.64	Maryam Yusuf Jamal	25 February 2006		Magglingen, Switzerland	
1500 m	3:59.79	Maryam Yusuf Jamal	9 March 2008	World Championships	Valencia, Spain	
Mile	4:24.71	Maryam Yusuf Jamal	20 February 2010	Aviva Indoor Grand Prix	Birmingham, United Kingdom	
3000 m	8:39.64	Winfred Yavi	14 February 2020	Meeting de l'Eure	Val-de-Reuil, France	
60 m hurdles						
2000m steeplechase	5:45.09	Winfred Yavi	9 February 2021	Meeting Hauts-de-France Pas-de-Calais	Liévin, France	
High jump	1.60 m	Mariam Mohamed Al-Ansari	26 February 2010		Doha, Qatar	
Pole vault						
Long jump	5.21 m	Noor Ebrahim Kazerooni	26 February 2010		Doha, Qatar	
Triple jump						
Shot put	17.45 m	Noora Salem Jasim	4 February 2017		Dobrich, Bulgaria	
Pentathlon						
Pentathlon	60m H / High jump / Shot put / Long jump / 800m					
3000 m walk						
4 × 400 m relay	3:35.07	Salwa Eid Naser; Aminat Yusuf Jamal; Iman Essa Jasim; Kemi Adekoya	21 February 2016	Asian Championships	Doha, Qatar	
