= Asian Indoor Athletics Championships =

Asian Athletics Indoor Championships
- Status: active
- Genre: sports event
- Frequency: biannual
- Location: various
- Inaugurated: 2004 Tehran
- Most recent: 2026 Tianjin
- Organiser: Asian Athletics Association

The Asian Indoor Athletics Championships were held for the first time in 2004. Run by the Asian Athletics Association, the championships take place biennially in different cities all over Asia.

== Editions ==
Edition	Year	Events	Host city	Host Country	Dates	Venue	Medals Winner
1	2004	30	Tehran	Iran	6–8 February	Aftab Enghelab Complex	China
2	2006	26	Pattaya	Thailand	10–12 February	Indoor Athletics Stadium	Kazakhstan
3	2008	26	Doha	Qatar	14–16 February	ASPIRE Dome	India
4	2010	26	Tehran	Iran	24–26 February	Aftab Enghelab Complex	Iran
5	2012	26	Hangzhou	China	18–19 February	Vocational and Technical College Athletics Hall	China
6	2014	26	Hangzhou	China	15–16 February	Vocational and Technical College Athletics Hall	Qatar
7	2016	26	Doha	Qatar	19–21 February	ASPIRE Dome	Qatar
8	2018	26	Tehran	Iran	1–3 February	Aftab Enghelab Complex	Kazakhstan
~~9~~	~~2020~~	26	Hangzhou	China	12–13 February	Cancelled due to COVID-19 pandemic	
10	2023	26	Astana	Kazakhstan	10–12 February	Kazakhstan Sports Palace	Japan
11	2024	26	Tehran	Iran	17–19 February	Aftab Enghelab Complex	China
12	2026	26	Tianjin	China	6–8 February	Tuanbo Sports Center Athletics Arena	China
13	2028	26	Bhubaneswar	India	February	Kalinga Stadium	

== Ranking ==
Year	Ranking by Medals		
Year	1	2	3
2004	China	Iran	Kazakhstan
2006	Kazakhstan	China	Japan
2008	India	China	Kazakhstan
2010	Iran	China	Qatar
2012	China	Iran	Bahrain
2014	Qatar	China	Kazakhstan
2016	Qatar	China	Kazakhstan
2018	Kazakhstan	Iran	Qatar
2023	Japan	Kazakhstan	Qatar
2024	China	Japan	Kazakhstan
2026	China	Qatar	Japan

== Medals (2004-2026) ==
Rank	Nation	Gold	Silver	Bronze	Total
1	China	72	55	52	179
2	Kazakhstan	48	34	41	123
3	Qatar	32	18	12	62
4	Japan	27	24	24	75
5	Iran	26	42	46	114
6	India	17	33	23	73
7	Bahrain	14	12	9	35
8	Uzbekistan	13	10	12	35
9	Kuwait	11	9	5	25
10	Kyrgyzstan	5	8	3	16
11	Saudi Arabia	5	1	3	9
12	Thailand	3	8	9	20
13	Chinese Taipei	3	7	4	14
14	Vietnam	3	3	5	11
15	United Arab Emirates	2	4	3	9
16	Oman	2	0	4	6
17	Hong Kong	1	4	3	8
18	South Korea	1	4	1	6
19	Malaysia	1	2	2	5
20	Sri Lanka	1	1	4	6
21	Bangladesh	1	1	1	3
22	Philippines	1	0	3	4
23	Syria	0	5	2	7
24	Iraq	0	3	1	4
25	Pakistan	0	1	1	2
26	Indonesia	0	0	4	4
27	Turkmenistan	0	0	3	3
28	Jordan	0	0	1	1
28	Lebanon	0	0	1	1
28	North Korea	0	0	1	1
28	Tajikistan	0	0	1	1
Totals (31 entries)		289	289	284	862

== See also ==
- Indoor athletics at the Asian Indoor and Martial Arts Games
- Asian Athletics Championships
- World Athletics Indoor Championships
- World Athletics Indoor Tour
- European Athletics Indoor Championships
- South American Indoor Championships in Athletics
