= 2021 Hungarian Athletics Championships =

- Edition: 126th
- Dates: 26–27 June
- Host city: Debrecen, Hungary
- Venue: Gyulai István Athletic Stadium
- Level: Senior
- Type: Outdoor

The 2021 Hungarian Athletics Championships was the 126th edition of the national championship in outdoor track and field for athletes in Hungary. It was held between 26 and 27 June at the Gyulai István Athletic Stadium in Debrecen.

== Results ==
=== Men ===
Event	Gold		Silver		Bronze	
100 metres	Dominik Illovszky; BHSE	10.51 PB	Tamás Máté; FTC	10.51	Rajmund Haufe; FTC	10.66
200 metres	Tamás Máté; FTC	20.98	Rajmund Haufe; FTC	21.54 PB	Zoltán Wahl; Budafoki MTE	21.54
400 metres	Attila Molnár; SVSE	47.08 PB	Patrik Simon Enyingi; FTC	47.74	Ernő Steigerwald; Békéscsabai AC	48.12 PB
800 metres	Balázs Vindics; UTE	1:47.59	Máté Együd; TFSE	1:48.40 PB	Tamás Kazi; FTC	1:48.88
1500 metres	István Dániel Szögi; SVSE	3:40.38	Márton Pápai; GEAC	3:41.07 PB	Gergő Xavér Kiss; SVSE	3:47.29
5000 metres	Levente Szemerei; Szekszárdi Sportközpont	14:19.90	Dárius Ádám Farkas; BEAC	14:27.04 PB	Gáspár Csere; BEAC	14:34.23 PB
110 metres hurdles	Valdó Szűcs; ZALASZÁM-ZAC	13.38 PB	Balázs Baji; BHSE	13.58	Bálint Szeles; Egri Sportiskola SE	13.97
400 metres hurdles	Máté Koroknai; DSC-SI	49.77	Nikolasz Csókás; ARAK UP Akadémia	52.15	Tibor Koroknai; DSC-SI	52.21
3000 metres steeplechase	István Palkovits; KARC	8:32.92	Levente Szemerei; Szekszárdi Sportközpont	8:53.56	Ferenc Soma Kovács; SVSE	9:03.39 PB
High jump	Dániel János Jankovics; MTK Budapest	2.19	Péter Bakosi; NYSC	2.16	Sámuel Hodossy-Takács; DSC-SI	2.12
High jump	Dániel János Jankovics; MTK Budapest	2.19	Péter Bakosi; NYSC	2.16	Péter Agárdi; BHSE	2.12
Pole vault	Marcell Nagy; MTK Budapest	5.00	Ádám Bence Mihály; GEAC	5.00	Márton Böndör; AC Bonyhád	4.60
Long jump	Dominik Pázmándi; Szolnoki MÁV-SE	7.65	Tibor Galambos; FTC	7.44	István Virovecz; FTC	7.41
Triple jump	Dániel Szenderffy; VSD	15.73 PB	Tibor Galambos; FTC	15.52	Kristóf Pap; FTC	15.25
Shot put	Balázs Tóth; NYSC	17.74	László Kovács; Ikarus BSE	17.64	Balázs Detrik; Ikarus BSE	16.91
Discus throw	János Huszák; FTC	63.31	Róbert Szikszai; NYSC	60.02	János Káplár; NYSC	53.84
Hammer throw	Bence Halász; Dobó SE	76.15	Dániel Rába; Dobó SE	75.37 PB	Bence Pásztor; VEDAC	71.65
Javelin throw	Norbert Rivasz-Tóth; Szolnoki MÁV-SE	77.99	Noel Kovács; Ikarus BSE	68.44	Attila Rab; Ikarus BSE	67.95
5000 metres race walk	Domonkos Miklós Srp; BHSE	21:00.80	Dávid Tokodi; FTC	21:33.18	Norbert Tóth; Hunyadi DSE	22:39.99
4 × 100 metres relay	BHSE "A"; Zalán Kádasi; Richárd Nagy; Dominik Illovszky; András Osztrogonácz	40.47	FTC; Rajmund Haufe; Tamás Máté; Patrik Simon Enyingi; Dániel Varga	40.69	BHSE "B"; Balázs Zsolt Kállai; Dávid Less; Bence Tamás Orosz; Kristóf Tóth	42.45
4 × 400 metres relay	SVSE; János Kubasi; István Dániel Szögi; Gergő Xavér Kiss; Attila Molnár	3:14.90	FTC; Dániel Varga; Ádám Tarlukács; Tamás Máté; Tamás Kazi	3:15.48	UTE; Bálint László Farkas; Bátor Péter Birovecz; Balázs Sánta; Balázs Vindics	3:18.32

=== Women ===
Event	Gold		Silver		Bronze	
100 metres	Luca Kozák; DSC-SI	11.63	Boglárka Takács; ARAK UP Akadémia	11.66	Jusztina Csóti; FTC	11.77
200 metres	Boglárka Takács; ARAK UP Akadémia	23.66 PB	Evelin Nádházy; GEAC	23.84 PB	Jusztina Csóti; FTC	23.88
400 metres	Evelin Nádházy; GEAC	53.00	Janka Molnár; Budafoki MTE	53.24	Hanna Répássy; MTK Budapest	55.56
800 metres	Bianka Bartha-Kéri; SVSE	2:01.87	Anna Ferencz; TFSE	2:02.72 PB	Hédi Heffner; BEAC	2:06.36 PB
1500 metres	Gréta Barbara Varga; SVSE	4:16.21 PB	Zita Urbán; BHSE	4:21.92 PB	Gabriella Szabó; DSC-SI	4:24.21 PB
5000 metres	Lilla Böhm; BHSE	16:31.31	Nóra Szabó; Margitszigeti AC	16:41.16 PB	Panna Merényi; BHSE	17:56.32
100 metres hurdles	Luca Kozák; DSC-SI	12.86 CR	Gréta Kerekes; DSC-SI	13.06	Petra Répási; FTC	13.75
400 metres hurdles	Janka Molnár; Budafoki MTE	56.03 PB	Sára Mátó; ARAK UP Akadémia	57.05	Regina Mohai; ARAK UP Akadémia	59.14 PB
3000 metres steeplechase	Lili Anna Tóth; BHSE	9:40.81 PB	Gréta Barbara Varga; SVSE	9:50.63 PB	Zita Kácser; DSC-SI	10:19.94
High jump	Barbara Szabó; UTE	1.79	Xénia Krizsán; MTK Budapest	1.76	Luca Boglárka Renner; MTK Budapest	1.73
Pole vault	Hanga Csenge Klekner; DSC-SI	4.25 PB	Petra Garamvölgyi; PVSK	4.20 PB	Diana Rozália Szabó; MTK Budapest	3.90
Long jump	Petra Beáta Farkas; BHSE	6.58	Diana Lesti; TSC-Geotech	6.42	Anasztázia Nguyen; MTK Budapest	6.23
Triple jump	Viktória Áts; TSC-Geotech	12.79	Vanda Hargitai; MTK Budapest	12.32	Beatrix Szabó; MTK Budapest	12.27
Shot put	Anita Márton; Békéscsabai AC	15.95	Violetta Veiland; SZVSE	15.02	Blanka Losonczi; SZVSE	13.70
Discus throw	Dóra Kerekes; NYSC	53.39	Anita Márton; Békéscsabai AC	53.13	Fanni Kövér; VEDAC	47.13
Hammer throw	Réka Gyurátz; Dobó SE	68.90	Zsanett Németh; Dobó SE	60.42	Villő Anna Viszkeleti; Dobó SE	59.10
Javelin throw	Réka Szilágyi; DSC-SI	60.67	Fanni Kövér; VEDAC	54.40	Angéla Moravcsik; MTK Budapest	53.85
5000 metres race walk	Viktória Madarász; UTE	21:56.37	Barbara Kovács; Békéscsabai AC	22:19.06 PB	Rita Récsei; BHSE	23:22.70
4 × 100 metres relay	GEAC; Alexa Sulyán; Johanna Pótha; Virág Simon; Evelin Nádházy	45.87	ARAK UP Akadémia; Luca Mészáros; Sára Mátó; Boglárka Takács; Regina Mohai	46.06	BHSE; Bíbor Skriván; Judit Bottlik; Anna Bognár; Petra Beáta Farkas	46.73
4 × 400 metres relay	GEAC; Virág Simon; Laura Dobránszky; Nóra Németh; Evelin Nádházy	3:43.78	SVSE; Bettina Kéri; Zsóka Hadnagy; Zsófia Márta Mező; Bianka Bartha-Kéri	3:47.70	ARAK UP Akadémia; Rita Enesei; Mónika Zsiga; Regina Mohai; Sára Mátó	3:48.68
