= 2018 Hungarian Athletics Championships =

- Dates: 22–24 June
- Host city: Székesfehérvár
- Venue: Bregyó Inter-Regional Athletic Center
- Level: Senior
- Type: Outdoor
- Events: 38 (men: 19; women: 19)

The 2018 Hungarian Athletics Championships were the 123rd edition of the Hungarian Athletics Championships, which took place on 22–24 June 2018 at the Bregyó Inter-Regional Athletic Center in Székesfehérvár.

== Schedule ==
Legend
Key	P	Q	H	½	F
Value	Preliminary round	Qualifiers	Heats	Semifinals	Final

Men's Schedule
Date	Jun 22		Jun 23		Jun 24	
100 m	H	F				
200 m					H	F
400 m		H	F			
800 m				H	F	
1500 m	F					
5000 m					F	
110 m hurdles			H	F		
400 m hurdles				H	F	
3000 m steeplechase			F			
High jump		Q	F			
Pole vault				Q	F	
Long jump			F			
Triple jump					F	
Shot put					Q	F
Discus throw					F	
Hammer throw		Q	F			
Javelin throw				Q	F	
4 × 100 m relay	F					
4 × 400 m relay					F	

Women's Schedule
Date	Jun 22		Jun 23		Jun 24	
100 m	H	F				
200 m					H	F
400 m		H	F			
800 m				H	F	
1500 m	F					
5000 m					F	
110 m hurdles			H	F		
400 m hurdles				H	F	
3000 m steeplechase			F			
High jump				Q	F	
Pole vault		Q	F			
Long jump				Q	F	
Triple jump		Q	F			
Shot put		Q	F			
Discus throw						F
Hammer throw		Q	F			
Javelin throw			F			
4 × 100 m relay	F					
4 × 400 m relay					F	

== Results ==
=== Men ===
==== Track ====
Event	Gold		Silver		Bronze	
100 m Wind: +0.7 m/s	Dániel Szabó; ARAK UP Akadémia	10.53	Bence Boros; Szolnoki MÁV-SE	10.57	Dominik Illovszky; Bp. Honvéd SE	10.58
200 m Wind: +0.2 m/s	László Szabó; FTC	21.13 =	Bence Boros; Szolnoki MÁV-SE	21.15	Tamás Máté; Bp. Honvéd SE	21.20
400 m	Boldizsár Boda; Haladás VSE	47.98	Máté Együd; TFSE	48.06	Dávid Tasi Tibor; NYSC	48.77
800 m	Gergő Kiss; SVSE	1:52.84	Márton Pápai; DSC-SI	1:52.87	Tamás Kazi; DSC-SI	1:52.98
1500 m	Tamás Kazi; DSC-SI	3:49.18	Benjámin Kovács; Bp. Honvéd SE	3:50.57	Gergő Kiss; SVSE	3:52.46
5000 m	László Gregor; Békéscsabai AC	14:25.66	István Palkovits; KARC	14:32.65	Attila Honti; Bp. Honvéd SE	14:39.98
110 m hurdles Wind: +1.3 m/s	Dr. Balázs Baji; Bp. Honvéd SE	13.39	Valdó Szűcs; ZALASZÁM-ZAC	13.88 =	Bálint Szeles; Egri Sportiskola SE	14.11
400 m hurdles	Tibor Koroknai; DSC-SI	50.80	Dániel Huller; Dunakeszi VSE	52.74	Dániel Varga; FTC	53.72
3000 m steeplechase	Balázs Juhász; DSC-SI	9:00.49	Áron Dani; BEAC	9:07.02	Ervin Dénes; Ikarus BSE	9:09.72
4 × 100 m relay	Bp. Honvéd SE "A"; Zalán Kádasi; Tamás Máté; Bence Tamás Orosz; András Osztrogonácz	41.18	Szolnoki MÁV-SE; Dávid János Soltész; Bence Boros; János Sipos; Dániel Ecseki	41.72	ZALASZÁM-ZAC; Mátyás Dienes; Valdó Szűcs; Péter Balogh; Barnabás Baki	42.16
4 × 400 m relay	Haladás VSE; Tamás Ecker; Dennis Jagodics; Dominik Sárközi; Boldizsár Boda	3:16.08	DSC-SI; Balázs Győri; Dr. Emánuel Gutema; Márton Pápai; Tibor Koroknai	3:16.19	FTC; Dániel Varga; Dániel Pozsgai; Dániel Kovács; Gábor Fekete	3:17.69
WR world record | ER European record | CR championship record | NR national record | WL world leading | EL European leading | PB personal best | SB seasonal best

* Indicates the athlete only competed in the preliminary heats and received medals.

==== Field ====
Event	Gold		Silver		Bronze	
High jump	Péter Bakosi; NYSC	2.18	Péter Agárdi; Bp. Honvéd SE	2.15 =	Dániel János Jankovics; BSC	2.15 =
Pole vault	Csanád Simonváros; GEAC	4.90	Tamás Kéri; Ikarus BSE	4.90	Ádám Bence Mihály; GEAC	4.80 =
Long jump	László Szabó; FTC	7.80	Kristóf Pap; Haladás VSE	7.55	Tibor Galambos; FTC	7.53
Triple jump	Tibor Galambos; FTC	15.91	Zoltán Prekli; FTC	14.94	Bence Miklós Leveleki; NYSC	14.88
Shot put	Balázs Detrik; Ikarus BSE	17.05 =	Tibor Rakovszky; Maximus SE	17.00	Gyula Szabó; Dobó SE	16.75
Discus throw	Róbert Szikszai; NYSC	62.47	Zoltán Kővágó; Szolnoki Honvéd	62.31	János Huszák; FTC	60.80
Hammer throw	Bence Halász; Dobó SE	78.22	Pászor Bence; ARAK UP Akadémia	72.79	Ákos Hudi; Dobó SE	71.09
Javelin throw	Norbert Rivasz-Tóth; Szolnoki MÁV-SE	77.90	Attila Rab; Ikarus BSE	69.60	Mihály Gál; Szolnoki MÁV-SE	65.63
WR world record | ER European record | CR championship record | NR national record | WL world leading | EL European leading | PB personal best | SB seasonal best

=== Women ===
==== Track ====
Event	Gold		Silver		Bronze	
100 m Wind: +0.7 m/s	Anasztázia Nguyen; MTK Budapest	11.58	Boglárka Takács; ARAK UP Akadémia	11.81	Éva Kaptur; Bp. Honvéd SE	11.93
200 m Wind: 0.0 m/s	Lili Fruzsina Furulyás; UTE	24.57	Éva Kaptur; Bp. Honvéd SE	24.61	Lotti Hajdú; Szolnoki MÁV-SE	24.61
400 m	Janka Molnár; Budafoki MTE	55.29	Hanna Répássy; Győri Atlétikai Club	56.22	Virág Simon; Győri Atlétikai Club	57.16
800 m	Bianka Kéri; SVSE	2:04.12	Krisztina Osváth; NYSC	2:09.33	Kinga Ohn; BEAC	2:09.66
1500 m	Viktória Gyürkés; Ikarus BSE	4:16.62	Kriszta Kószás; TSC-Geotech	4:23.31	Lilla Böhm; Bp. Honvéd SE	4:23.68
5000 m	Lili Anna Tóth; Bp. Honvéd SE	16:25.19	Lilla Böhm; Bp. Honvéd SE	16:34.73	Kriszta Kószás; TSC-Geotech	17:08.95
100 m hurdles Wind: +1.9 m/s	Luca Kozák; DSC-SI	12.86; U23-	Gréta Kerekes; DSC-SI	12.95	Klaudia Sorok; Győri Atlétikai Club	13.35
400 m hurdles	Sára Mátó; ARAK UP Akadémia	58.07; U20-	Mónika Zsiga; ARAK UP Akadémia	1:00.94	Mira Kőszegi; Budafoki MTE	1:01.58
3000 m steeplechase	Viktória Gyürkés; Ikarus BSE	10:04.38	Zita Kácser; DSC-SI	10:14.36	Lili Anna Tóth; Bp. Honvéd SE	10:19.04
4 × 100 m relay	Bp. Honvéd SE; Vivien Fanni Schmelz; Éva Kaptur; Anna Sajtos; Katalin Turcsik	46.11	ARAK UP Akadémia; Boglárka Takács; Sára Mátó; Mónika Zsiga; Klaudia Endrész	47.02	Szolnoki MÁV-SE; Nikolett Kalóz; Lotti Hajdú; Ágnes Knipfer; Zsófi Ecseki-Tóth	47.69
4 × 400 m relay	Bp. Honvéd SE; Adél Király; Éva Kaptur; Anna Sajtos; Györgyi Zsivoczky-Farkas	3:49.48	ARAK UP Akadémia; Mónika Zsiga; Adrienn Punk; Alíz Darabos; Sára Mátó	3:50.62	SVSE; Zsóka Hadnagy; Evelin Farsang; Anna Göncz; Bianka Kéri	3:52.66
WR world record | ER European record | CR championship record | NR national record | WL world leading | EL European leading | PB personal best | SB seasonal best

* Indicates the athlete only competed in the preliminary heats and received medals.

==== Field ====
Event	Gold		Silver		Bronze	
High jump	Györgyi Zsivoczky-Farkas; Bp. Honvéd SE	1.81	Luca Renner; GEAC	1.81	Xénia Krizsán; MTK Budapest	1.79
Pole vault	Zsófia Siskó; ARAK UP Akadémia	4.10	Diana Rozália Szabó; MTK Budapest	4.00	Boglárka Kulcsár; KSI SE	3.80 =
Long jump	Anasztázia Nguyen; MTK Budapest	6.26	Petra Beáta Farkas; Dunakeszi VSE	6.26	Diana Lesti; KARC	6.24
Triple jump	Krisztina Hoffer; TSC-Geotech	13.48	Eszter Bajnok; Favorit AC	14.94; U23-	Viktória Áts; TSC-Geotech	14.88
Shot put	Anita Márton; Békéscsabai AC	17.76	Violetta Veiland; ZALASZÁM-ZAC	15.17	Györgyi Zsivoczky-Farkas; Bp. Honvéd SE	14.08
Discus throw	Anita Márton; Békéscsabai AC	56.85	Dóra Kerekes; NYSC	51.49	Krisztina Váradi; Maximus SE	48.87
Hammer throw	Réka Gyurátz; Dobó SE	67.70	Éva Orbán; VEDAC	64.14	Cintia Gergelics; Dobó SE	64.11
Javelin throw	Angéla Moravcsik; MTK Budapest	55.42	Barbara Tremmel; UTE	49.80	Xénia Krizsán; MTK Budapest	48.22
WR world record | ER European record | CR championship record | NR national record | WL world leading | EL European leading | PB personal best | SB seasonal best

== Medal table ==
Rank	Team	Gold	Silver	Bronze	Total
1	Bp. Honvéd SE	6	4	7	17
2	DSC-SI	4	4	1	9
3	ARAK UP Akadémia	3	4	0	7
4	Ikarus BSE	3	2	1	6
5	FTC	3	1	4	8
6	MTK Budapest	3	1	2	6
7	Békéscsabai AC	3	0	0	3
8	NYSC	2	2	2	6
9	Haladás VSE	2	1	0	3
10	Dobó SE	2	0	3	5
11	SVSE	2	0	2	4
12	Szolnoki MÁV-SE	1	3	3	7
13	TSC-Geotech	1	1	2	4
14	GEAC	1	1	1	3
15	UTE	1	1	0	2
16	Budafoki MTE	1	0	1	2
17	ZALASZÁM-ZAC	0	2	1	3
18	Dunakeszi VSE	0	2	0	2
19	Győri Atlétikai Club	0	1	2	3
20	KARC	0	1	1	2
20	BEAC	0	1	1	2
20	Maximus SE	0	1	1	2
23	TFSE	0	1	0	1
23	Szolnoki Honvéd	0	1	0	1
23	Favorit AC	0	1	0	1
23	VEDAC	0	1	0	1
27	Egri Sportiskola SE	0	0	1	1
27	BSC	0	0	1	1
27	KSI SE	0	0	1	1
Total		38	38	38	116

== See also ==
- Hungarian Athletics Championships
- Hungarian Athletics Association
