= 2020 Hungarian Athletics Championships =

- Edition: 125th
- Dates: 8–9 August
- Host city: Budapest
- Venue: Lantos Mihály Sportközpont
- Level: Senior
- Type: Outdoor
- Events: 40 (men: 20; women: 20)

The 2020 Hungarian Athletics Championships were the 125th edition of the Hungarian Athletics Championships, which took place on 8–9 August 2020 at the Lantos Mihály Sportközpont in Budapest.

== Results ==
=== Men ===
Event	Gold		Silver		Bronze	
100 metres	Tamás Máté	10.54 s	Bence Boros	10.55 s SB	Dániel Szabó	10.67 s
200 metres	Tamás Máté	21.03 s	Bence Boros	21.46 s	Dániel Ajide	21.52 s
400 metres	Dániel Ajide	47.55 s PB	Dániel Pozsgai	47.68 s	Attila Molnár	47.99 s PB
800 metres	Balázs Vindics	1:46.50 min	Gergő Kiss	1:48.49 min SB	Máté Együd	1:49.29 min
1500 metres	István Szögi	3:54.67 min	Márton Pápai	3:55.13 min	Gergő Kiss	3:55.19 min
5000 metres	István Szögi	14:40.69 min	Milán Fazekas	14:45.97 min SB	Ákos Zsetnyai	14:48.18 min PB
110 m hurdles	Valdó Szűcs	13.66 s	Balázs Baji	13.88 s	Bálint Szeles	13.96 s SB
400 m hurdles	Máté Koroknai	50.56 s	Tibor Koroknai	51.02 s SB	Ádám Bencsik	53.30 s PB
3000 m steeplechase	István Palkovits	8:54.77 min	Levente Szemerei	9:19.01 min	Márton Nick	9:28.98 min SB
5000 m walk	Maté Helebrandt	20:26.41 min SB	Bence Barnabás Venyercsán	20:40.78 min SB	Tomasz Bagdány	21:14.22 min SB
4 × 100 m relay	Honvéd Budapest; Zálan Kádasi; András Osztrogonácz; Dominik Illovszky; Balázs Baji	40.90 s	Szolnoki MÁV-SE; Dominik Pázmándi; Bence Boros; János Sipos; Dániel Ecsek	41.18 s	Ferencváros Budapest; Dániel Illovszky; Tamás Máté; László Szabó; Dániel Varga	41.41 s
4 × 400 m relay	Ferencváros Budapest; Adám Tarlukács; Tamás Kazi; Patrik Enyingi; László Szabó	3:16.04 min	Soproni VSE; János Kubasi; Gergő Kiss; István Szögi; Attila Molnár (sprinter)	3:16.25 min	Újpesti TE; Ben Birovecz; Dániel Pozsgai; Márk Vörös; Balázs Vindics	3:16.68 min
High jump	Dániel Jankovics	2.20 m	Péter Bakosi	2.17 m =SB	Sámuel Hodossy-Takács	2.11 m
Pole vault	Marcell Nagy	5.10 m	Csanád Simonváros	5.11 m	József Bánocivs	4.70 m =PB
Long jump	Tibor Galambos	7.29 m	Bence Bánhidi	6.98 m SB	Milán Nagy	6.95 m
Triple jump	Tibor Galambos	15.62 m	Robin Pál	15.23 m SB	Dániel Szenderffy	15.93 m SB
Shot put	Balázs Tóth	17.18 m	Balázs Detrik	16.80 m	László Kovács	16.68 m
Discus throw	János Huszák	61.58 m	Zoltán Kővágó	57.32 m SB	Bence Halász	54.54 m
Hammer throw	Bence Halász	79.88 m	Krisztián Pars	74.35 m SB	Dániel Rába	73.19 m
Javelin throw	Norbert Rivasz-Tóth	79.83 m	Máté Járvás	74.07 m PB	Márk Schmölcz	69.64 m

=== Women ===
Event	Gold		Silver		Bronze	
100 metres	Luca Kozák	11.64 s	Jusztina Csóti	11.94 s	Boglárka Takács	12.02 s
200 metres	Vanessza Nagy	24.34 s	Jusztina Csóti	24.39 s =SB	Evelin Nádházy	24.43 s SB
400 metres	Janka Molnár	53.25 s	Evelin Nádházy	53.84 s SB	Sára Mátó	54.39 s
800 metres	Bianka Bartha-Kéri	2:05.08 min	Hanna Répássy	2:07.37 min PB	Anna Ferencz	2:107.85 min
1500 metres	Viktória Wagner-Gyürkés	4:15.92 min	Gréta Varga	4:28.38 min	Kinga Ohn	4:31.77 min
5000 metres	Viktória Wagner-Gyürkés	16:17.51 min	Lili Anna Tóth	16:24.05 min	Anna Pataki	16:28.60 min PB
100 m hurdles	Luca Kozák	12.97 s	Gréta Kerekes	13.16 s SB	Petra Répási	13.37 s SB
400 m hurdles	Janka Molnár	56.94 s	Sára Mátó	57.34 s SB	Dóra Horváth	59.56 s SB
3000 m steeplechase	Lili Anna Tóth	10:10.22 min	Zita Kácser	10:22.18 min SB	Boglárka Mógor	10:30.81 min SB
5000 m walk	Barbara Kovács	23:42.85 min SB	Rita Récsei	24:08.05 min SB	Dóra Csörgő	24:28.21 min SB
4 × 100 m relay	GEAC; Petra Répási; Johanna Pótha; Laura Dobránszky; Evelin Nádházy	46.53 s	Ferencváros Budapest; Fanni Edőcs; Jusztina Csóti; Vanessza Nagy; Adél Király	47.28 s	Honvéd Budapest; Bíbor Skriván; Anna Bognár; Lilla Bartha; Petra Farkas	47.34 s
4 × 400 m relay	GEAC; Petra Répási; Sára Csernyánszky; Laura Dobránszky; Evelin Nádházy	3:45.94 min	Soproni VSE; Bettina Kéri; Gréta Varga; Anna Göncz; Bianka Bartha-Kéri	3:47.58 min	ARAK UP Akadémia; Mónika Zsiga; Rita Enesei; Boglárka Takács; Sára Mátó	3:48.29 min
High jump	Barbara Szabó	1.84 m	Fédra Fekete	1.75 m SB	Rita Nemes	1.75 m
Pole vault	Hanga Klekner	4.00 m =SB	Diana Szabó	4.00 m	Petra Garamvölgyi	3.80 m =SB
Long jump	Anasztázia Nguyen	6.42 m	Petra Farkas	6.33 m	Diana Lesti	6.23 m
Triple jump	Szabina Szűcs	12.98 m	Viktória Áts	12.82 m SB	Krisztina Hoffer	12.79 m SB
Shot put	Violetta Veiland	15.50 m	Krisztina Váradi	14.19 m	Xénia Krizsán	13.76 m
Discus throw	Dóra Kerekes	54.74 m	Krisztina Váradi	49.51 m	Fanni Kövér	46.87 m
Hammer throw	Réka Gyurátz	69.31 m	Éva Orbán	63.26 m	Zsanett Németh	57.14 m
Javelin throw	Réka Szilágyi	59.04 m	Fanni Kövér	52.63 m	Annabella Bogdán	49.65 m
