= 2016 Hungarian Athletics Championships =

- Dates: 29–31 July 2016
- Host city: Székesfehérvár, Hungary
- Venue: Bregyó közi Regionális Atlétikai Központ
- Level: Senior
- Type: Outdoor
- Events: 40 (men: 16; women: 2)

The 2016 Hungarian Athletics Championships were the 121st edition of the Hungarian Athletics Championships, which took place on 29–31 July 2016 at the Regionális Atlétikai Központ in Székesfehérvár.

== Schedule ==
Day 1 (29 July)

Time	Event
17:20	Women's 100 m finals
17:30	Men's 100 m finals
18:15	Women's 4x100 m relay
18:30	Men's 4x100 m relay
18:45	Women's 1500 m
19:00	Men's 1500 m

Day 2 (30 July)

Time	Event
14:00	Women's hammer throw
15:00	Women's pole vault
15:30	Men's long jump
15:40	Women's 400 m time trial
15:50	Men's 400 m time trial
16:00	Women's 100 m hurdles final
16:20	Men's 100 m hurdles final
16:50	Women's javelin throw
17:00	Women's triple jump Women's shot put
17:10	Men's high jump
18:20	Men's hammer throw
19:15	Women's 3000 m steeplechase
19:30	Men's 3000 m steeplechase

Day 3 (31 July)

Time	Event
16:00	Men's pole vault Women's long jump Women's discus throw
16:40	Women's 400 m hurdles time trial
17:00	Men's 400 m hurdles time trial
17:15	Men's discus throw
17:20	Women's 200 m finals (B–A)
17:30	Men's 200 m finals (B–A); Men's tiple jump
17:40	Women's 800 m time trial
17:50	Men's 800 m time trial
18:00	Women's high jump
18:05	Men's 5000 m time trial
18:20	Men's javelin throw
18:25	Women's 5000 m time trial
18:30	Men's shot put
18:50	Women's 4x400 m relay
19:00	Men's 4x400 m relay

== Results ==
=== Men's events ===
==== Track ====
Event	Gold		Silver		Bronze	
100 m (+0.6 m/s)	János Sipos; Szolnoki MÁV-SE	10.39 =	Dominik Illovszky; Bp. Honvéd SE	10.59	Dániel Szabó; ARAK UP Akadémia	10.62
200 m (−4.6 m/s)	János Sipos; Szolnoki MÁV-SE	21.74	Dániel Szabó; ARAK UP Akadémia	21.90	Gergely Viktor Berzsenyi; Bp. Honvéd SE	21.99
400 m	Marcell Deák-Nagy; Gödöllői EAC	46.77	Boldizsár Boda; Haladás VSE	48.30	Gábor Szilágyi; Győri Atlétikai Club	48.70
800 m	Tamás Kazi; DSC-SI	1:51.35	Gergő Kiss; VEDAC	1:52.10	Balázs Vindics; UTE	1:52.18
1500 m	Tamás Kazi; DSC-SI	3:40.93	Benjámin Kovács; UTE	3:41.27	László Gregor; Békéscsabai AC	3:45.07
5000 m	Benjámin Kovács; UTE	15:18.54	István Dániel Szögi; VEDAC	15:20.45	Miklós Tábor; Békéscsabai AC	15:21.28
110 m hurdles (+2.5 m/s)	Balázs Baji; Békéscsabai AC	13.39	Valdó Szűcs; ZALASZÁM-ZAC	13.78	Máté Gönczöl; VEDAC	14.62
400 m hurdles	Tibor Koroknai; DSC-SI	50.85	Ottó Tamási; KARC	52.37	Tamás Kővári; Ikarus BSE	52.52
3000 m steeplechase	Balázs Juhász; DSC-SI	8:52.07	László Gregor; Békéscsabai AC	8:54.50	Áron Dani; BEAC	9:10.78
4 × 100 m relay	Szolnoki MÁV-SE; Zsolt Pázmándi; Bence Boros; János Sipos; Dániel Ecseki	40.61	Bp. Honvéd SE; Dominik Illovszky; Áron Tóth; Bence Tamás Orosz; Gergely Viktor Berzsenyi	41.70	Haladás VSE; Kristóf Pap; Tibor Kása; Dániel Koszti; Boldizsár Boda	41.89
4 × 400 m relay	Gödöllői EAC; Szabolcs Vigvári; Márk Pálmai; Ákos Takács; Marcell Deák-Nagy	3:12.17	DSC-SI; Árpád Győri; Tamás Kazi; Márton Pápai; Tibor Koroknai	3:13.22	Haladás VSE; Tibor Kása; Dávid Kemény; Dennis Jagodics; Boldizsár Boda	3:15.55

==== Field ====
Event	Gold		Silver		Bronze	
High jump	Péter Bakosi; NYSC	2.12	Dániel János Jankovics; BSC	2.08	Csaba Benjamin Horváth; Ikarus BSE	2.04
Pole vault	Tamás Kéri; Ikarus BSE	5.00	Csanád Simonváros; Gödöllői EAC	4.90	Dezső Szabó; Győri Atlétikai Club	4.80 =
Long jump	István Virovecz; FTC	7.81	Tibor Galambos; FTC	7.34	Bence Bánhidi; POSTÁS SE	7.28
Triple jump	Dávid László; ARAK UP Akadémia	16.46	Tibor Galambos; FTC	15.81	Kristóf Pap; Haladás VSE	15.75
Shot put	Lajos Imre Kürthy; Mohácsi TE	17.11	Tibor Rakovszky; KSI SE	17.09	Viktor Páli; VEDAC	17.04
Discus throw	Zoltán Kővágó; Szolnoki Honvéd	59.54	Róbert Szikszai; NYSC	58.59	János Káplár; NYSC	58.30
Hammer throw	Krisztián Pars; Dobó SE	73.38	Bence Halász; Dobó SE	72.22	Dániel Rába; Dobó SE	66.82
Javelin throw	Norbert Rivasz-Tóth; Törökszentmiklósi DAK	75.11	Attila Rab; Ikarus BSE	70.62	Tamás Gulyás; Szolnoki MÁV-SE	69.84

=== Women's events ===
==== Track ====
Event	Gold		Silver		Bronze	
100 m (+1.4 m/s)	Éva Kaptur; Gödöllői EAC	11.61	Anasztázia Nguyen; MTK Budapest	11.65	Jusztina Csóti; ZALASZÁM-ZAC	11.83
200 m (−3.5 m/s)	Éva Kaptur; Gödöllői EAC	24.72	Jusztina Csóti; ZALASZÁM-ZAC	24.85	Evelin Nádházy; Bp. Honvéd SE	24.95
400 m	Bianka Kéri; VEDAC	53.94	Evelin Nádházy; Bp. Honvéd SE	54.17	Krisztina Osváth; NYSC	55.67
800 m	Bianka Kéri; VEDAC	2:08.60	Bernadett Aradi; DSC-SI	2:10.12	Sophie Apáthy; Vasas	2:11.48
1500 m	Kriszta Kószás; Győri Atlétikai Club	4:28.70	Lili Anna Tóth; DOVASE	4:28.88	Lilla Böhm; KSI SE	4:32.89
5000 m	Viktória Gyürkés; Ikarus BSE	16:40.64	Zsófia Erdélyi; UTE	16:46.23	Lili Anna Tóth; DOVASE	16:48.99
100 m hurdles (+0.4 m/s)	Gréta Kerekes; DSC-SI	13.28	Luca Kozák; DSC-SI	13.33	Lilla Juhász; Haladás VSE	13.73
400 m hurdles	Noémi Szűcs; HÓDIÁK	1:00.34	Mónika Zsiga; Ikarus BSE	1:00.67	Sára Mátó; ARAK UP Akadémia	1:01.21
3000 m steeplechase	Viktória Gyürkés; Ikarus BSE	10:15.99	Anett Somogyi; VEDAC	10:23.27	Kriszta Kószás; Győri Atlétikai Club	10:45.34
4 × 100 m relay	Gödöllői EAC; Petra Répási; Éva Kaptur; Katalin Turcsik; Kriszta Komiszár	46.79	VEDAC; Bettina Kéri; Bianka Kéri; Eszter Csorba; Evelin Renkó	47.83	ZALASZÁM-ZAC; Jusztina Csóti; Melinda Ferenczi; Lotti Horváth; Bettina Tóth	47.92
4 × 400 m relay	Bp. Honvéd SE; Fanni Reizinger; Györgyi Zsivoczky-Farkas; Zsanett Zsíros; Evelin Nádházy	3:48.05	Gödöllői EAC; Petra Répási; Éva Kaptur; Adél Király; Kriszta Komiszár	3:50.21	DSC-SI; Anna Tácsik; Bernadett Aradi; Fanni Sárkány; Luca Anna Palásti	3:50.89

==== Field ====
Event	Gold		Silver		Bronze	
High jump	Barbara Szabó; UTE	1.90	Xénia Krizsán; MTK Budapest	1.75	Enikő Erős; FTC	1.75
Pole vault	Enikő Erős; FTC	4.25	Krisztina Szűcs; MTK Budapest	3.80	Hanga Csenge Klekner; DSC-SI	3.50
Long jump	Vivien Fanny Schmelcz; TFSE	6.36	Xénia Krizsán; MTK Budapest	6.17	Petra Beáta Farkas; UTE	6.13
Triple jump	Krisztina Hoffer; TSC-Geotech	13.02	Ivett Indaia; Szekszárdi Sportközpont Nkft.	12.86	Eszter Bajnok; Favorit AC	12.55
Shot put	Anna Márton; Békéscsabai AC	18.52	Györgyi Zsivoczky-Farkas; Bp. Honvéd SE	14.46	Krisztina Váradi; Maximus SE	14.36
Discus throw	Anna Márton; Békéscsabai AC	54.56	Krisztina Váradi; Maximus SE	48.51	Dóra Kerekes; NYSC	46.97
Hammer throw	Réka Gyurátz; Dobó SE	69.66	Éva Orbán; VEDAC	66.15	Cintia Gergelics; Dobó SE	63.14
Javelin throw	Réka Szilágyi; Törökszentmiklósi DAK	56.39	Angéla Moravcsik; MTK Budapest	53.86	Anikó Ormay; Bp. Honvéd SE	51.65

== See also ==
- Hungarian Athletics Championships
- Hungarian Athletics Association
