= 2023 Hungarian Athletics Championships =

2023 Hungarian Athletics Championships 128th Hungarian Championships in Athletics
- Edition: 128th
- Dates: 7–8 July
- Host city: Budapest, Hungary
- Venue: National Athletics Centre
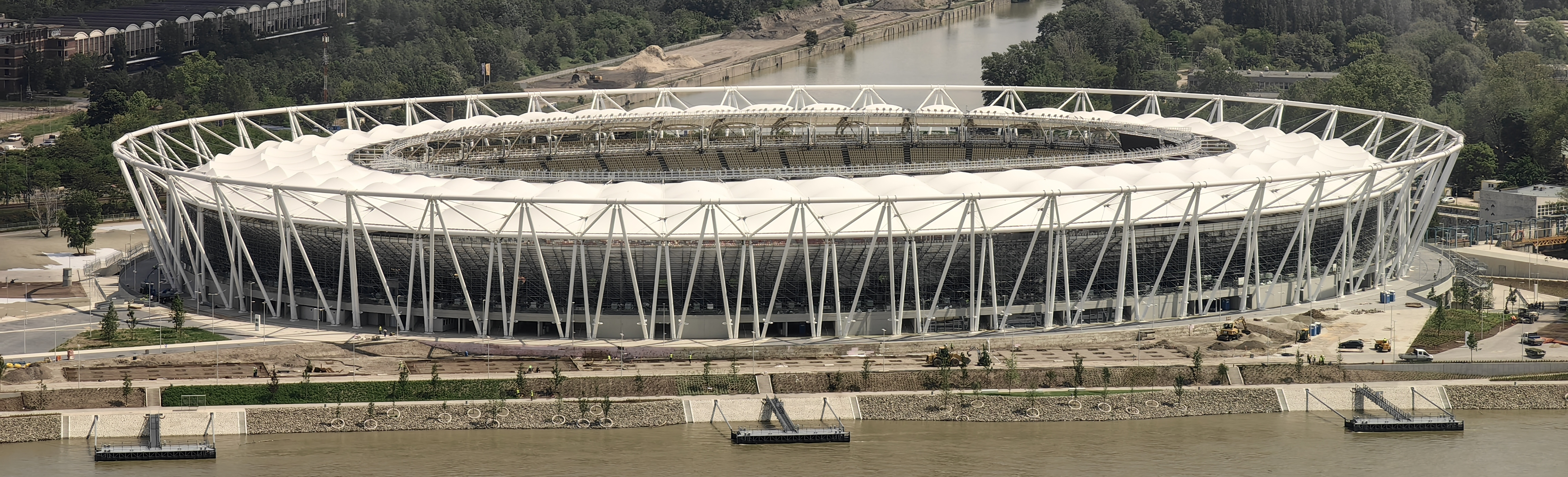
- Level: Senior
- Type: Outdoor

The 2023 Hungarian Athletics Championships (Hungarian: 2023-as magyar atlétikai bajnokság) was the 128th edition of the national championship in outdoor track and field for athletes in Hungary. It was held between 7 and 8 July at the National Athletics Centre in Budapest.

The schedule of events other than this tournament is as follows:

- Winter throwing - 3-4 March (Veszprém)
- 35 kilometres race walk - 25 March (Dudince, Slovakia)
- 20 kilometres race walk - 23 April (Békéscsaba)
- Marathon - 23 April (Vienna City Marathon)
- Relays (4x200 m, 4x800 m) - 7 May (UTE Athletics Stadium)
- 10,000 m - 13 May (Vasas SC Field)
- Combined - 17–18 June (Szolnok)
- Relays (4x100 m, 4x400 m) - 2 September

== Results ==
=== Men ===
Event	Gold		Silver		Bronze	
100 metres	Bence Boros; NYSC	10.50	Dominik Illovszky; BHSE	10.55	Patrik Bundschu; Vasas	10.56
200 metres	Zoltán Wahl; TSC-Geotech	21.07	Patrik Bundschu; Vasas	21.25 PB	Levente László Nadj; Békéscsabai AC	21.69
400 metres	Zoltán Wahl; TSC-Geotech	46.32 PB	Ernő Steigerwald; Békéscsabai AC	46.63 PB	Dániel Gellért Huller; VSD	47.13
800 metres	Dániel Gellért Huller; VSD	1:47.08	Balázs Vindics; UTE	1:47.11	Gergő Xavér Kiss; SVSE	1:47.34 SB
1500 metres	Gergő Xavér Kiss; SVSE	3:39.05 PB	István Dániel Szögi; SVSE	3:39.16	Márk Vörös; KSI SE	3:40.14 PB
5000 metres	Márk Vörös; KSI SE	14:05.85 PB	Gábor Karsai; Békéscsabai AC	14:10.82	Barnabás Sós; Margitszigeti AC	14:29.36 PB
110 metres hurdles	Bálint Szeles; EVSI	13.64	Dániel Eszes; VSD	14.15	Zoltán Polyák; Ikarus BSE	14.48 PB
400 metres hurdles	Árpád Nimród Bánóczy; Vasas	50.79 PB	Csaba Levente Molnár; Ikarus BSE	51.13	Tibor Koroknai; DSC-SI	51.43 SB
3000 metres steeplechase	István Palkovits; KARC	8:38.81	Ferenc Soma Kovács; SVSE	8:56.42 SB	Balázs Kovács; BHSE	8:59.69 PB
High jump	Gergely Török; DSC-SI	2.16	Dániel János Jankovics; MTK Budapest	2.16 SB	Csaba Benjamin Horváth; Ikarus BSE	2.12
Pole vault	Márton Böndör; AC Bonyhád	5.10	Tamás Kéri; Ikarus BSE	5.10 SB	Marcell Nagy; MTK Budapest	5.00
Long jump	Kristóf Pap; FTC	7.53	Mátyás Németh; KARC	7.32	Sámuel Hodossy-Takács; DSC-SI	7.30
Triple jump	Kristóf Pap; FTC	15.91 PB	Tibor Galambos; FTC	15.69	Dániel Szenderffy; VSD	15.47
Shot put	Balázs Tóth; NYSC	18.05	László Kovács; Ikarus BSE	17.89 SB	István Fekete; KARC	17.17 SB
Discus throw	Róbert Szikszai; NYSC	59.69	János Huszák; FTC	55.79 SB	Márton Csontos; BSC	54.31
Hammer throw	Bence Halász; Dobó SE	77.52 SB	Donát Varga; Dobó SE	75.26	Dániel Rába; Dobó SE	72.47
Javelin throw	György Herczeg; FTC	79.89 U20-NR	Norbert Rivasz-Tóth; Szolnoki SC-SI	75.41	Noel Kovács; Ikarus BSE	72.18 SB
5000 metres race walk	Máté Helebrandt; NYSC	19:32.59 NR	Norbert Tóth; H. Szondi SE	19:56.05 PB	Dávid Tokodi; FTC	21:03.16 PB

=== Women ===
Event	Gold		Silver		Bronze	
100 metres	Boglárka Takács; BHSE	11.36	Luca Kozák; DSC-SI	11.45 PB	Jusztina Csóti; FTC	11.51
200 metres	Boglárka Takács; BHSE	23.27	Alexa Sulyán; MATE - GEAC	23.49 U20-NR	Jusztina Csóti; FTC	23.51 PB
400 metres	Bianka Bartha-Kéri; SVSE	52.61 PB	Fanni Rapai; Ikarus BSE	53.32 PB	Evelin Nádházy; MATE - GEAC	53.33 SB
800 metres	Bianka Bartha-Kéri; SVSE	2:02.97	Gabriella K. Szabó; NYSC	2:07.61 SB	Hédi Heffner; BEAC	2:09.05 SB
1500 metres	Viktória Wagner-Gyürkés; Ikarus BSE	4:11.03 SB	Lili Anna Vindics-Tóth; BHSE	4:13.88	Kinga Farkas-Ohn; BEAC	4:19.98 SB
5000 metres	Viktória Wagner-Gyürkés; Ikarus BSE	15:35.83	Lili Anna Vindics-Tóth; BHSE	15:57.74	Kata Kocsis; FTC	17:54.86 PB
100 metres hurdles	Luca Kozák; DSC-SI	12.72 SB	Anna Tóth; DVTK	12.84 U23-NR	Gréta Kerekes; DSC-SI	12.93 PB
400 metres hurdles	Janka Molnár; TSC-Geotech	56.58	Sára Mátó; MTK Budapest	57.32	Regina Mohai; MTK Budapest	57.92 PB
3000 metres steeplechase	Gréta Barbara Varga; SVSE	10:36.15 SB	Natália Iker; Csepeli DAC	10:47.69 PB	Nóra Nagy; TSC-Geotech	10:54.06 PB
High jump	Fédra Fekete; BHSE	1.85 PB	Lilianna Bátori; Vasas	1.78	Luca Boglárka Renner; MTK Budapest	1.75 SB
Pole vault	Hanga Csenge Klekner; DSC-SI	4.40	Petra Garamvölgyi; PVSK	4.00	Emma Mészáros; KSI SE	3.80 SB
Pole vault	Hanga Csenge Klekner; DSC-SI	4.40	Petra Garamvölgyi; PVSK	4.00	Diana Rozália Szabó; MATE - GEAC	3.80 SB
Long jump	Petra Beáta Bánhidi-Farkas; BHSE	6.55	Diana Lesti; TSC-Geotech	6.43	Bori Rózsahegyi; TSC-Geotech	6.32 PB
Triple jump	Beatrix Szabó; MTK Budapest	12.93	Viktória Áts; TSC-Geotech	12.77	Petra Nyisztor; NYSC	12.56
Shot put	Anita Márton; Békéscsabai AC	18.40 SB	Violetta Veiland; SZVSE	15.63	Renáta Beregszászi; SZVSE	14.80 SB
Discus throw	Anita Márton; Békéscsabai AC	54.73 SB	Dóra Kerekes; NYSC	53.18	Krisztina Váradi; Maximus SE	45.34
Hammer throw	Réka Gyurátz; Dobó SE	69.66 SB	Zsanett Németh; Dobó SE	64.61 SB	Villő Anna Viszkeleti; Dobó SE	63.63
Javelin throw	Angéla Moravcsik; MTK Budapest	58.06	Fanni Kövér; VEDAC	57.54	Annabella Bogdán; Békéscsabai AC	53.75
5000 metres race walk	Viktória Madarász; UTE	21:58.84 SB	Barbara Oláh; Békéscsabai AC	22:05.04 PB	Alexandra Kovács; Békéscsabai AC	22:46.85

== See also ==
- List of Hungarian records in athletics
