= 2011 Hungarian Athletics Championships =

- Dates: 6–7 August 2011
- Host city: Szekszárd, Hungary
- Venue: Városi Szabadidőközpont
- Level: Senior
- Type: Outdoor
- Events: 38
- Records set: 1

The 2011 Hungarian Athletics Championships were the 116th edition of the Hungarian Athletics Championships, which took place on 6–7 August 2011 at the Városi Szabadidőközpont in Szekszárd.

== Qualification standards ==
Athletes who have attained the qualification mark in each specific event might participate at the championships:

Men	Event	Women
11.20	100m	12.70
22.20	200m	25.90
50.30	400m	59.80
1:59.00	800m	2:20.00
4:05.00	1500m	4:59.00
15:30.00	5000m	18:50.00
11:00.00	3000m steeplechase	12:50.00
15.90	110m/100m hurdles	15.70
59.00	400m hurdles	1:09.00
1.95 m	High jump	1.65 m
6.80 m	Long jump	5.50 m
13.80 m	Triple jump	11.80 m
4.20 m	Pole vault	3.00 m
14.00 m	Shot put	11.50 m
46.00 m	Discus throw	36.50 m
56.00 m	Javelin throw	40.00 m
53.00 m	Hammer throw	45.00 m

== Schedule ==
Day 1

Time	Event
14:45	Women's hammer throw
16:00	Women's 100 m hurdles heats Women's pole vault
16:15	Women's long jump Men's javelin throw
16:20	Men's 110 m hurdles heats
16:35	Women's 100 m heats
16:50	Men's 100 m heats
17:10	Women's 110 m hurdles final
17:20	Men's 100 m hurdles final
17:30	Women's 100 m finals (B–A)
17:40	Men's 100 m finals (B–A)
18:00	Men's high jump
18:05	Women's 400 m time trial
18:10	Men's long jump Women's javelin throw
18:15	Men's 400 m time trial
18:25	Women's 1500 m
18:35	Men's 1500 m
18:45	Women's 3000 m steeplechase
19:00	Men's 3000 m steeplechase
19:20	Women's 4x100 m relay
19:30	Men's 4x100 m relay

Day 2

Time	Event
15:00	Men's hammer throw
16:30	Women's 400 m hurdles time trial Women's triple jump
16:45	Men's 400 m hurdles time trial Men's pole vault Women's discus throw Men's shot put
17:15	Women's 200 m heats
17:25	Men's 200 m heats
17:30	Women's high jump
17:40	Women's 800 m time trial
17:50	Men's 800 m time trial
18:05	Women's 5000 m time trial Men's tiple jump
18:10	Men's discus throw
18:15	Women's shot put
18:35	Women's 200 m finals (B–A)
18:45	Men's 200 m finals (B–A)
18:55	Men's 5000 m time trial
19:20	Women's 4x400 m relay
19:30	Men's 4x400 m relay

== Results ==
=== Men ===
Event	Gold		Silver		Bronze	
100 metres Wind: –0.9 m/s	Dániel Karlik; KSI SE	10.71	Roland Németh; Magyar AC	10.82	Géza Pauer; Ferencvárosi TC	10.84
200 metres Wind: –1.1 m/s	Tibor Kása; Haladás VSE	21.31	Gábor Pásztor; KSI SE	21.41	Máté Lukács; Favorit AC Kaposvár	21.70
400 metres	Marcell Deák-Nagy; Gödöllői EAC	46.41	Máté Lukács; Favorit AC Kaposvár	47.09	Tibor Kása; Haladás VSE	47.23
800 metres	Tamás Kazi; DSC-SI	1:48.01	Péter Szemeti; Újpesti TE	1:48.27	István Kolossváry; Testnevelési Főiskola SE	1:49.52
1500 metres	Péter Szemeti; Újpesti TE	3:48.08	Miklós Tábor; Buda-Cash Békéscsabai AC	3:49.57	Dániel Kállay; VEDAC	3:49.60
5000 metres	László Tóth; Buda-Cash Békéscsabai AC	14:25.46	Barnabás Bene; Pécsi VSK	14:31.57	Tamás Kovács; VEDAC	14.33.24
110 metres hurdles Wind: –2.0 m/s	Balázs Baji; Buda-Cash Békéscsabai AC	14.22	Máté Gönczöl; VEDAC	14.39	Tibor Koroknai; DSC-SI	14.53
400 metres hurdles	Tibor Koroknai; DSC-SI	51.27	Máté Koroknai; DSC-SI	52.50	Mátyás Hegedűs; TSC-Geotech	53.19
3000 metres steeplechase	László Tóth; Buda-Cash Békéscsabai AC	8:36.94	Albert Minczér; VEDAC	8:37.75	Benjamin Szalai; VEDAC	9:05.33
4x100 metres relay	Budapesti Honvéd SE; Gábor Kiss; Dávid Vas; Norbert Propszt; Gergő Bézsenyi	41.90	KSI SE "B"; Soma Hoppál; Botond Tölgyesi; Levente Kafer; Ottó Tamási	42.62	VEDAC "A"; Gergely Nagy; Máté Gönczöl; Dávid Kungli; Gábor Nagy	43.34
4x400 metres relay	DSC-SI; Emanuel Gutema; Máté Koroknai; Tibor Koroknai; Tamás Kazi	3:12.22	Gödöllői EAC; Zoltán Kovács; Ádám Kamen; Gergő Kolesza; Marcell Deák-Nagy	3:14.59	VEDAC "A"; Kornél Schmidt; Dávid Takács; Dániel Kállay; László Bartha	3:15.00
High jump	Olivér Harsányi; DSC-SI	2.13	Dávid Fajoyomi; Gödöllői EAC	2.13	Péter Bakosi; Nyírsuli	2.10
Pole vault	Péter Skoumal; DSC-SI	5.00	Ákos Jäger; Budapesti Honvéd SE	4.90	Tamás Várszegi; Gödöllői EAC	4.80
Long jump	Bence Bánhidi; Testnevelési Főiskola SE	7.81	Dániel Ecseki; Szolnoki MÁV SE	7.68	István Virovecz; Haladás VSE	7.60
Triple jump	Stavros Georgiou; Budapesti Honvéd SE	15.95	Dávid László; Alba Regia AK	15.14	Robin Pál; MISI SC	15.10
Shot put	Lajos Kürthy; Mohácsi TE	19.51	Viktor Páli; VEDAC	17.32	Ádám Máriássy; Budapesti Honvéd SE	16.30
Discus throw	Zoltán Kővágó; Szolnoki Honvéd SE	67.17	Gábor Máté; CSASE	59.08	Péter Savanyú; Omega AC Tamási	58.46
Hammer throw	Krisztián Pars; Dobó SE	80.63	Kristóf Németh; Dobó SE	74.94	Ákos Hudi; VEDAC	70.95
Javelin throw	Krisztián Török; Ferencvárosi TC	78.51	Bence Papp; Reménység Vác	74.77	Tamás Bakos; Ferencvárosi TC	68.59

=== Women ===
Event	Gold		Silver		Bronze	
100 metres Wind: –2.0 m/s	Anasztázia Nguyen; Budapesti Honvéd SE	11.83	Éva Kaptur; KSI SE	11.98	Fanny Schmelz; Budapesti Honvéd SE	12.23
200 metres Wind: –1.1 m/s	Anasztázia Nguyen; Budapesti Honvéd SE	24.14	Barbara Petráhn; Szekszárdi AK SE	24.24	Éva Kaptur; KSI SE	24.80
400 metres	Barbara Petráhn; Szekszárdi AK SE	53.56	Bianka Varga; Budapesti Honvéd SE	54.66	Bianka Kéri; VEDAC	55.22
800 metres	Zsanett Kenesei; BEAC	2:18.21	Zsófia Kratochwill; Építők SC	2:18.56	Johanna Tóth; Vasas MiFiN	2:19.82
1500 metres	Krisztina Papp; Újpesti TE	4:19.55	Zsanett Kenesei; BEAC	4:27.15	Zita Kácser; Szolnoki MÁV SE	4:30.17
5000 metres	Krisztina Papp; Újpesti TE	16:24.98	Zsófia Erdélyi; Újpesti TE	17:06.84	Zita Kácser; Szolnoki MÁV SE	17:26.04
100 metres hurdles Wind: –1.5 m/s	Petra Munkácsy; Budapesti Honvéd SE	13.95	Fanni Juhász; Zalaszám-ZAC	13.96	Gréta Kerekes; DSC-SI	13.97
400 metres hurdles	Lilla Lóránd; VEDAC	1:01.59	Zsófia Némethy; Zalaszám-ZAC	1:02.31	Csenge Kálmán; DSC-SI	1:02.49
3000 metres steeplechase	Zsófia Erdélyi; Újpesti TE	10:27.84	Viktória Gyürkés; Ikarus BSE	11:05.45	Zita Kácser; Szolnoki MÁV SE	11:32.76
4x100 metres relay	Budapesti Honvéd SE "A"; Petra Munkácsy; Bianka Varga; Fanny Schmelz; Anasztázia Nguyen	45.85	Alba Regia AK; Rita Babos; Virág Frey; Dóra Pálinkás; Katalin Turcsik	47.80	KSI SE; Alexandra Budai; Éva Kaptur; Bianka Bekecs; Katalin Tungli	48.09
4x400 metres relay	Budapesti Honvéd SE; Xénia Krizsán; Emese Steinmetz-Bobcsek; Györgyi Farkas; Bianka Varga	3:45.09	DSC-SI; Dóra Szarvas; Bernadett Aradi; Fanni Sárkány; Csenge Kálmán	3:51.65	VEDAC; Cecília Nagy; Lilla Lóránd; Zsófia Pernesz; Bianka Kéri	3:52.50
High jump	Rita Babos; Alba Regia AK	1.81	Györgyi Farkas; Budapesti Honvéd SE	1.79	Réka Czúth; Pécsi VSK	1.76
Pole vault	Enikő Erős; Ferencvárosi TC	3.90	Daniella Szabó; Budapesti Honvéd SE	3.70	Gabriella Koppány; Budapesti Honvéd SE	3.50
Long jump	Xénia Krizsán; Budapesti Honvéd SE	6.25	Zita Ajkler; Vasas MiFiN	6.18	Györgyi Farkas; Budapesti Honvéd SE	6.09
Triple jump	Rita Babos; Alba Regia AK	13.50	Zita Ajkler; Vasas MiFiN	12.96	Krisztina Hoffer; TSC-Geotech	12.71
Shot put	Anita Márton; Buda-Cash Békéscsabai AC	16.70	Krisztina Váradi; GANZAIR AC	13.67	Jenny Ozorai; Dobó SE	12.71
Discus throw	Anita Márton; Buda-Cash Békéscsabai AC	50.77	Krisztina Váradi; GANZAIR AC	47.02	Tamara Tóth Baranyi; Buda-Cash Békéscsabai AC	45.23
Hammer throw	Éva Orbán; VEDAC	70.71 CR	Jenny Ozorai; Dobó SE	63.88	Cintia Gergelics; Dobó SE	63.05
Javelin throw	Vanda Juhász; Ferencvárosi TC	58.03	Anikó Ormay; Testnevelési Főiskola SE	51.04	Nikolett Szabó; Ferencvárosi TC	48.62
