= 2012 Hungarian Athletics Championships =

- Dates: 16–17 June 2012
- Host city: Szekszárd, Hungary
- Venue: Városi Szabadidőközpont
- Level: Senior
- Type: Outdoor
- Events: 37 (Note: The annulled race of the men's 1500 metres is not included.)
- Records set: 1

The 2012 Hungarian Athletics Championships were the 117th edition of the Hungarian Athletics Championships, which took place on 16–17 June 2012 at the Városi Szabadidőközpont in Szekszárd. The competition was organized in remembrance of Ágoston Schulek, a multiple Hungarian champion in pole vault as an active and the president of the Hungarian Athletics Association after his retirement, who died in October 2011.

== Qualification ==
Initially, Hungarian athletes who met the qualification standard in each specific event might have taken part at the championships, however, the qualification method was later changed. By the new rules, a limit of competitors was set in each event, that allowed only the highest ranked athletes to participate. In addition, foreign athletes who produced in the calendar year an at least 1000 points performance according to the IAAF Scoring Tables were also eligible for participation. Their achievements, however, did not count toward the official results.

The entry limit for the events were the following:

Men	Event	Women
24	100m	24
24	200m	24
24	400m	24
24	800m	24
16	1500m	16
24	5000m	24
16	3000m steeplechase	16
16	110m/100m hurdles	16
16	400m hurdles	16
18	High jump	18
18	Long jump	18
18	Triple jump	18
16	Pole vault	16
18	Shot put	18
18	Discus throw	18
18	Javelin throw	18
18	Hammer throw	18

== Schedule ==
Day 1

Time	Event
14:45	Women's hammer throw
15:00	Women's pole vault
16:00	Women's 100 m hurdles heats
16:10	Men's 110 m hurdles heats
16:15	Women's triple jump Men's javelin throw
16:25	Women's 100 m heats
16:40	Men's 100 m heats
17:00	Women's 110 m hurdles final
17:10	Men's 100 m hurdles final
17:30	Women's 100 m finals (B–A); Men's High Jump
17:40	Men's 100 m finals (B–A)
18:00	Men's high jump
18:05	Women's 400 m time trial
18:10	Men's long jump Women's javelin throw
18:15	Men's 400 m time trial
18:25	Women's 1500 m
18:40	Women's 3000 m steeplechase
19:00	Men's 3000 m steeplechase
19:20	Women's 4×100 m relay
19:30	Men's 4×100 m relay
19:45	Men's 1500 m

Day 2

Time	Event
15:00	Men's hammer throw
16:00	Men's pole vault
16:30	Women's 400 m hurdles time trial Women's long jump
16:45	Men's 400 m hurdles time trial Women's discus throw Men's shot put
17:15	Women's 200 m heats
17:25	Men's 200 m heats
17:30	Women's high jump
17:40	Women's 800 m time trial
17:50	Men's 800 m time trial
18:05	Men's tiple jump
18:10	Men's discus throw
18:15	Women's shot put
18:35	Women's 200 m finals (B–A)
18:45	Men's 200 m finals (B–A)
18:55	Men's 5000 m time trial
19:00	Women's 5000 m time trial
19:20	Women's 4×400 m relay
19:30	Men's 4×400 m relay

== Results ==
=== Men ===
Event	Gold		Silver		Bronze	
100 metres Wind: –1.9 m/s	Miklós Szebeny; Vasas-MiFiN	10.91	Roland Németh; Magyar AC	10.96	Géza Pauer; Budaörsi AC	10.97
200 metres Wind: 0 m/s	Tibor Kása; Haladás VSE	21.17	Géza Pauer; Budaörsi AC	21.50	Dávid Bartha; AC Bonyhád	21.53
400 metres	Marcell Deák-Nagy; Gödöllői EAC	45.93	Tibor Kása; Haladás VSE	47.12	Zoltán Kovács; Gödöllői EAC	47.50
800 metres	Péter Szemeti; Újpesti TE	1:48.96	Dániel Kállay; VEDAC	1:50,55	Dávid Takács; VEDAC	1:51.25
1500 metres	The Competition Committee annulled the results of the event because the unauthorized participation of an athlete. The date of the re-run will be determined by the Hungarian Athletics Association in a later time.					
5000 metres	Barnabás Bene; Pécsi VSK	14:32.93	Miklós Tábor; Buda-Cash Békéscsabai AC	14:33.37	Gábor Józsa; Magyar AC	14:34.37
110 metres hurdles Wind: –3.4 m/s	Balázs Baji; Buda-Cash Békéscsabai AC	13.74	Dániel Kiss; Ikarus BSE	13.78	Máté Göncöl; VEDAC	14.51
400 metres hurdles	Tibor Koroknai; DSC-SI	51.60	Máté Koroknai; DSC-SI	52.84	Tamás Kővári; Ikarus BSE	53.04
3000 metres steeplechase	Albert Minczér; VEDAC	8:54.43	Benjamin Szalai; VEDAC	8:59.51	Attila Czindrity; SZoESE	9:24.40
4×100 metres relay	Budaörsi AC; Gergely Palágyi; Róbert Szabó; Gábor Papp; Géza Pauer	42.16	VEDAC; Gergely Nagy; László Bartha; Gábor Nagy; Máté Gönczöl	42.20	Gödöllői EAC; Ádám Karlik; Zoltán Kovács; Dániel Pozsgai; Botond Tölgyesi	42.23
4×400 metres relay	VEDAC "A"; Kornél Schmidt; Dávid Takács; Dániel Kállay; László Bartha	3:13.82	Gödöllői EAC; Ádám Tarlukács; Zoltán Kovács; Botond Tölgyesi; Marcell Deák-Nagy	3:14.21	Haladás VSE; Bálint Móricz; Ákos Kamarás; Dániel Koszti; Tibor Kása	3:17.73
High jump	Olivér Harsányi; DSC-SI	2.15	Péter Bakosi; Nyírsuli	2.10	Ádám Gerencsér; TSC-Geotech	2.05
Pole vault	Márton Horváth; Budapesti Honvéd SE	4.70	Levente Kecskés; Ikarus BSE	4.60	Róbert Fülöp; KSI SE	4.60
Long jump	István Virovecz; Haladás VSE	7.66	Bence Bánhidi; Testnevelési Főiskola SE	7.56	Márk Szabó; Favorit AC	7.49
Triple jump	Stavros Georgiou; Budapesti Honvéd SE	16.09	Tibor Galambos; Ferencvárosi TC	15.46	Robin Pál; MVSI	15.43
Shot put	Lajos Kürthy; Mohácsi TE	19.95	Viktor Páli; VEDAC	17.33	Zsolt Varga; Pécsi VSK	17.09
Discus throw	Zoltán Kővágó; Szolnoki Honvéd SE	67.91	Gábor Máté; CSASE	56.99	András Seres; Maximus KSE	55.74
Hammer throw	Krisztián Pars; Dobó SE	80.28	Kristóf Németh; Dobó SE	73.54	Ákos Hudi; Haladás VSE	71.92
Javelin throw	Bence Papp; Reménység Vác	75.66	Krisztián Török; KARC	75.60	Zoltán Magyari; Reménység Vác	71.84

=== Women ===
Event	Gold		Silver		Bronze	
100 metres Wind: –1.9 m/s	Éva Kaptur; Gödöllői EAC	11.71	Liliána Guba; Szolnoki VSI	12.27	Fanny Schmelz; Budapesti Honvéd SE	12.32
200 metres Wind: 0 m/s	Éva Kaptur; Gödöllői EAC	23.71	Liliána Guba; Szolnoki VSI	24.48	Petra Répási; Csepeli DAC	24.54
400 metres	Bianka Kéri; VEDAC	53.42	Barbara Petráhn; Szekszárdi AK SE	54.67	Csenge Kálmán; Gödöllői EAC	56.18
800 metres	Boglárka Bozzay; VEDAC	2:06.13	Zsanett Kenesei; BEAC	2:08.44	Bernadett Aradi; DSC-SI	2:09.54
1500 metres	Krisztina Papp; Újpesti TE	4:17.61	Zsanett Kenesei; BEAC	4:21.49	Boglárka Bozzay; VEDAC	4:24.61
5000 metres	Andrea Szederkényi-Takács; Vasas-MiFiN	17:14.44	Réka Czebei; Favorit AC	17:29.09	Zita Kácser; Szolnoki MÁV SE	17:35.88
100 metres hurdles Wind: –1.8 m/s	Sophie Jancsurák; Vasas-MiFiN	14.08	Xénia Krizsán; Budapesti Honvéd SE	14.28	Gréta Kerekes; DSC-SI	14.46
400 metres hurdles	Nóra Zajovics; Bercsényi DSE	1:00.43	Fanni Dániel; KARC	1:00.65	Zsófia Némethy; Zalaszám-ZAC	1:02.49
3000 metres steeplechase	Lívia Tóth; VEDAC	10:36.17	Zita Kácser; Szolnoki MÁV SE	10:51.32	Viktória Gyürkés; Ikarus BSE	10:56.80
4×100 metres relay	Gödöllői EAC; Dorina Vincze; Csenge Kálmán; Kitty Zircher; Éva Kaptur	47.07	Bercsényi DSE; Nóra Zajovics; Dorottya Keller; Fanni Reizinger; Krisztina Szabó	47.87	DSC-SI; Roberta Lesku; Dóra Szarvas; Luca Kozák; Gréta Kerekes	48.21
4×400 metres relay	VEDAC "A"; Evelin Farsang; Boglárka Bozzay; Lilla Lóránd; Bianka Kéri	3:44.03	DSC-SI; Dóra Szarvas; Bernadett Aradi; Roberta Lesku; Fanni Sárkány	3:51.26	Bercsényi DSE; Fanni Reizinger; Dorottya Keller; Krisztina Kószás; Nóra Zajovics	3:52.97
High jump	Barbara Szabó; Újpesti TE	1.86	Patrícia Bihari; KSI SE	1.80	Rita Babos; Alba Regia AK	1.78
Pole vault	Daniella Szabó; Budapesti Honvéd SE	4.00	Diana Szabó; Budapesti Honvéd SE	3.90	Felícia Horváth; Budapesti Honvéd SE	3.90
Long jump	Xénia Krizsán; Budapesti Honvéd SE	6.03	Zita Ajkler; Vasas MiFiN	5.94	Krisztina Szabó; Bercsényi DSE	5.90
Triple jump	Krisztina Hoffer; TSC-Geotech	13.25	Rita Babos; Alba Regia AK	13.17	Olívia Vild; Budapesti Honvéd SE	12.91
Shot put	Anita Márton; Buda-Cash Békéscsabai AC	16.79	Krisztina Váradi; GANZAIR AC	14.08	Zsófia Bácskay; Continent Company SE	13.42
Discus throw	Anita Márton; Buda-Cash Békéscsabai AC	52.64	Krisztina Váradi; GANZAIR AC	49.98	Katalin Máté; CSASE	48.07
Hammer throw	Cintia Gergelics; Dobó SE	64.83	Jenny Ozorai; Dobó SE	63.62	Réka Gyurácz; Dobó SE	62.13 NR-U18
Javelin throw	Vanda Juhász; Ferencvárosi TC	59.31	Xénia Nagy; DSC-SI	54.95	Xénia Frajka; Gödöllői EAC	53.81
