= Wegerle =

Wegerle is a surname. Notable people with the surname include:

- Geoff Wegerle (born 1954), South African footballer, brother of Steve
- Roy Wegerle (born 1964), American soccer player
- Steve Wegerle (born 1953), South African footballer

== See also ==
- Wekerle
