= Nándor Fóthy =

Hungarian discus thrower

Nándor Fóthy (Hungarian pronunciation: [ˈnaːndor ˈfoːti]) was a Hungarian track and field athlete and one of the best discus throwers of his time. Competing for Nagykanizsai Testnevelési Egylet until 1903 and for Aradi Atlétikai Club subsequently, he won two Hungarian Athletics Championships titles in discus throw in 1903 and 1904. In 1902 he became the first discus thrower to breach the 40-meters mark (40.61 meters), which was an unofficial world record that time – world records in the men's discus were not recognized by the International Association of Athletics Federations (IAAF) until 1912. In 1903 Fóthy further improved his best to 41.80 meters.
