= Gábor Pásztor =

Personal information
- Nationality: Hungarian
- Born: November 25, 1982 (age 43) Budapest, Hungary
- Height: 6 ft 5 in (196 cm)
- Weight: 194 lb (88 kg)

Gábor Pásztor (born 25 November 1982) is a Hungarian sprinter and entrepreneur who competed in the 100 m and 200 m for Hungary at the national and international levels between 2000 and 2016.After retiring from elite competition, he founded Athletic Club Miami, a Florida-based training group that prepares European athletes for NCAA and World Athletics events.

== Career ==
=== Junior and collegiate ===
Pásztor first broke 11 seconds (10.96 s, +1.8 m/s) in the 100 m while at Városmajor High School, Budapest. He accepted an athletic scholarship to Barry University (NCAA Division II) in 2005, majoring in sports management, and became the Buccaneers' most valuable track athlete in 2006 after winning the Sunshine State Conference title in the 200 m (21.34 s, -0.2 m/s).

=== Senior club career ===
- 2006–2011 – Ferencvárosi TC: six-time Hungarian League 4 × 100 m champion; 100 m pb 10.48 s (+1.9 m/s, Szekesfehérvár 2009).
- 2012 – Központi Sportiskola: trained under Sándor Munkácsy; competed at the 2012 European Championships in Helsinki (4 × 100 m, heat 3, 39.28 s).
- 2014–2016 – returned to FTC and lowered his 60 m indoor best to 6.72 s (Budapest, 2015).

=== International results ===
Representing Hungary
| Year | Competition | Venue | Position | Event | Notes |
|---|---|---|---|---|---|
| 2009 | European Team Championships – 1st League | Bergen, Norway | 6th | 4 × 100 m | 39.86 |
| 2012 | European Championships | Helsinki, Finland | 14th (h) | 4 × 100 m | 39.28 |
| 2013 | Universiade | Kazan, Russia | 19th (qf) | 200 m | 21.65 (−0.5) |

=== Post-retirement ===
In 2016 Pásztor relocated permanently to Miami, Florida, and registered Athletic Club Miami (ACM) as a 501(c)(3) non-profit. The club provides sprint and hurdle coaching to junior and post-collegiate athletes; alumni include 2022 NCAA Division II 100 m champion Ricardo Pierre-Louis (Barry University). ACM hosts the annual "Miami Invitational" meet at Tropical Park Stadium, sanctioned by World Athletics since 2021.

== Personal bests ==
| Event | Time | Wind | Venue | Date |
|---|---|---|---|---|
| 60 m (indoor) | 6.72 | —N/a | Budapest, HUN | 14 Feb 2015 |
| 100 m | 10.48 | +1.9 | Székesfehérvár, HUN | 20 Jun 2009 |
| 200 m | 21.21 | +0.8 | Miami, USA | 16 May 2013 |

Pásztor represented Hungary on several international competitions such as:

- 2008 European Cup (athletics) First League, Istanbul (Turkey) 4 × 100 m, 200 m
- 2009 European Team Championships First League, Bergen (Norway) 4 × 100 m, 200m
- 2009 Summer Universiade, Belgrade (Serbia) 200m
- 2010 European Team Championships First League, Budapest (Hungary) 200 m
- 2010 European Athletics Championships – Men's 4 x 400 metres relay Barcelona (Spain) 4 × 400 m
- 2011 European Team Championships First League, Izmir (Turkey) 4 × 100 m, 200m
- 2014 European Team Championships First League, Tallinn (Estonia) 200m, 4 × 400 m
- 2015 European Team Championships Second League, Stara Zagora, (Bulgaria) 400m, 4 × 400 m
- 2016 European Athletics Championships Amsterdam 2016, (Netherlands) 200m

== National Achievements ==
- 2006 Hungarian Athletics Championships, Men's 200 m – Silver
- 2007 Hungarian Athletics Championships, Men's 4 × 100 m – Gold
- 2008 Hungarian Athletics Championships, Men's 200 m – Gold
- 2009 Hungarian Athletics Championships, Men's 4 × 100 m – Gold
- 2009 Hungarian Athletics Championships, Men's 200 m – Silver
- 2010 Hungarian Athletics Championships, Men's 200 m – Gold
- 2011 Hungarian Athletics Championships Men's 200 m – Silver
