= Wekerle =

Wekerle is a surname. Notable people with the name include:

- Hartmut Wekerle (born 1944), German medical scientist and neurobiologist
- Michael Wekerle, Canadian merchant banker and television personality
- Sándor Wekerle (1848–1921), Hungarian politician and Prime Minister of Hungary
- Sándor Wekerle Jr. (1878–1963), Hungarian politician and Minister of Finance

== See also ==
- Wekerle Business School (Hungarian: Wekerle Sándor Üzleti Főiskola), college in Budapest, Hungary
- Wekerle estate (Hungarian: Wekerletelep), part of Budapest's XIX. district (known as Kispest), Hungary
