= National Athletics Centre (Budapest) =

Track and field stadium in Budapest, Hungary

- Nemzeti Atlétikai Központ
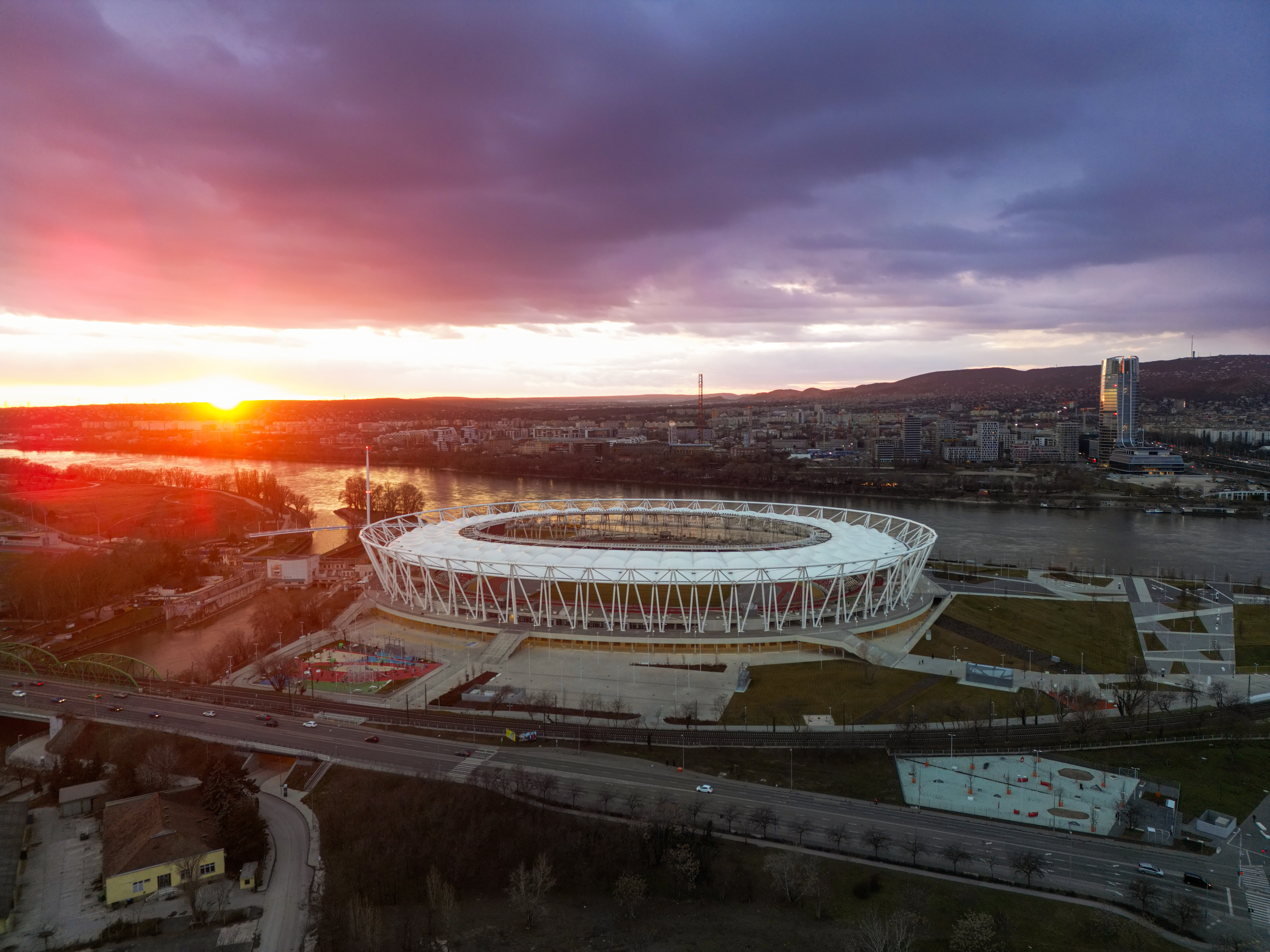
- Interactive map of National Athletics Centre
- Full name: National Athletics Centre
- Location: Budapest, Hungary
- Coordinates: 47°27′48″N 19°4′12″E
- Owner: Hungarian Athletics Association (MASZ)
- Capacity: 36,000 (2023 World Athletics Championships); 15,000 (current)
- Surface: Grass infield

Construction
- Opened: 17 June 2023
- Cost: HUF 246 billion (€658 million)
- Architects: FERENCZ, Marcel - NAPUR Architect Kft

Tenant
- Hungarian Athletics Association (2023–present)

The National Athletics Centre (Hungarian: Nemzeti Atlétikai Központ, pronounced [ˈnɛmzɛti ˈɒtleːtikɒji ˈkøspont]) is a track and field stadium in Budapest, Hungary. It has held the 2023 World Athletics Championships. The stadium was built on the eastern bank of the Danube River south of central Budapest, with a capacity of 36,000 for the championships, which was reduced to 15,000 for future events.

An all-purpose stadium with a capacity of 60.000 had been planned for the site as part of Budapest's cancelled bid for the 2024 Summer Olympics. In 2017, when the Hungarian Athletics Federation applied to host the 2023 World Athletics Championships, a smaller stadium was planned and eventually constructed after Budapest won the bid in 2018. The stadium stood on what was the compound of Scientific Research Institute for Water Management (VITUKI); demolition of the old compound which included a tower block began in 2020, parallel with the construction start of the new stadium.

Construction was completed in 2023, complemented with a public recreation area as well as a network of footpaths and bicycle paths which includes bridges. After the stadium's capacity was reduced by dismantling the upper tier, another running track was installed on its footprint, which was opened for public use.

The centre is accessible by a number of public transport services, namely trams, buses, and suburban rail. The Közvágóhíd transport hub serves all three modes and is the nearest public transport access to the stadium, in addition to the stadium's own bus stop.
