= List of Hungarian Athletics Championships champions =

See:

- List of Hungarian Athletics Championships champions (men)
- List of Hungarian Athletics Championships champions (women)
