= Ferencvárosi TC (athletics) =

Athletics club from Budapest, Hungary

FTC Atlétika
- Founded: 1903
- Colors
- Website: fradi.hu/atlétika

FTC Atlétika is an athletics club from Budapest, Hungary. It is part of the sports society Ferencvárosi TC.

== Honours and achievements ==
=== Men ===
- National Championships:
  - Winners (37):
- National Cups:
  - Winners (42):

=== Women ===
- National Championships:
  - Winners (20):
- National Cups:
  - Winners (20):
- European Champion Clubs Cup:
  - Runners-up (1):
  - Third place (1):

== Notable athletes ==
- (Ethiopia) Fikre Wondafrash
- (Socialist Federal Republic of Yugoslavia) Slobodan Branković
- (Socialist Federal Republic of Yugoslavia) Branko Dangubić
- (Socialist Federal Republic of Yugoslavia) Borislav Dević
