= Ferenc Soma Kovács =

Hungarian athlete (born 2004)

Personal information
- Nationality: Hungarian
- Born: 14 June 2004 (age 22)

Sport
- Sport: Athletics
- Event(s): Steeplechase, cross-country

Achievements and titles
- Personal best(s): 800m: 1:47.92 (New Haven, 2025); 1500m: 3:37.47 (Budapest, 2024); Mile:3:58.92 (Boston, 2024); 5000m: 14:08.24 (Philadelphia, 2022); 3000m Steeplechase: 8:43.98 (Philadelphia, 2024)
Medal record
Men's athletics
Representing Hungary
European U20 Championships
Bronze medal – third place	2023 Jerusalem	3000m steeplechase

Ferenc Soma Kovács (born 14 June 2004) is a Hungarian runner. He competed at the 2023 World Athletics Championships over 5000 metres. He was a bronze medalist at the 2023 European Athletics U20 Championships in the 3000 metres steeplechase. He became Hungarian national champion over 1500 metres in 2024.

== Early life ==
He attended Illyés Gyula High School and Vocational High School in Budaörs. He won a national high school geography academic competition. He attended Woodberry Forest School in Virginia in the United States in 2021. In 2022, he earned a scholarship to Harvard University, also in the United States.

== Career ==
He trained as a member of Veszprém Sportolj Velünk Sports Association in Hungary. In 2023, he signed a sponsorship contract with Nike. That year, he set new Hungarian national under-20 records for the 1500 metres both indoors and outdoors, and the 3000 metres indoors. He was a bronze medalist at the 2023 European Athletics U20 Championships in Jerusalem, Israel, in the 3000 metres steeplechase. He competed at the 2023 World Athletics Championships over 5000 metres in Budapest, but did not qualify for the final.

In 2024, he broke the Hungarian U23 national record in the mile run, running 3:58.09 seconds in Boston, Massachusetts. He won the Hungarian Athletics Championships over 1500 metres in June 2024 in 3:47.17. That month, competing at the Honved Cup, he broke the Hungarian U23 record for the 1500 metres with a time of 3:37.47.

Competing for Harvard University, he won the Ivy League 800 metres title before finishing third at the NCAA Outdoor Championships in Eugene, Oregon in the 1500 metres in June 2025. Later that month, he competed for Hungary over 1500 metres at the 2025 European Athletics Team Championships First Division in Madrid. The following month, he placed fifth in the final of the 1500 metres at the 2025 European Athletics U23 Championships in Bergen, Norway.

== Personal life ==
He is multi-lingual, speaking German, English, and Spanish as well as Hungarian. He has a keen interest in fine art.
