= Dávid László =

Hungarian association football player

Personal information
- Full name: Dávid László
- Date of birth: 25 April 2002 (age 24)
- Place of birth: Székesfehérvár, Hungary
- Height: 1.75 m (5 ft 9 in)
- Position: Centre-forward

Team information
- Current team: Szentlőrinc
- Number: 10

Youth career
- 2008–2014: Videoton
- 2014–2016: Győr
- 2016–2020: Budapest Honvéd

Senior career*
Years	Team	Apps	(Gls)
2020–	Budapest Honvéd	11	(0)
2021	→ Siófok (loan)	1	(0)
2021–2022	→ Budafok (loan)	33	(2)
2022–	→ Szentlőrinc (loan)	33	(3)

International career^{‡}
2017–2018	Hungary U-16	12	(2)
2018–2019	Hungary U-17	10	(0)
2019	Hungary U-18	1	(0)
- * Club domestic league appearances and goals as of 31 May 2023 ‡ National team caps and goals as of 21 August 2019

Dávid László (born 25 April 2002) is a Hungarian football forward who plays for Szentlőrinc on loan from Budapest Honvéd.

== Career ==
On 30 July 2022, László joined Szentlőrinc on a season-long loan.

== Career statistics ==
As of 15 May 2021

Appearances and goals by club, season and competition
Club	Season	League			Cup		Continental		Other		Total	
Club	Season	Division	Apps	Goals	Apps	Goals	Apps	Goals	Apps	Goals	Apps	Goals
Budapest Honvéd	2019–20	Nemzeti Bajnokság I	4	0	2	0	0	0	—		6	0
Budapest Honvéd	2020–21	Nemzeti Bajnokság I	7	0	2	0	0	0	—		9	0
Budapest Honvéd	Total		11	0	4	0	0	0	0	0	15	0
Career total			11	0	4	0	0	0	0	0	15	0
