= Géza Pauer =

Hungarian sprinter

Géza Pauer (born 7 January 1976) is a Hungarian sprinter who specializes in the 200 metres.

He competed at the 2003 World Championships and the 2004 World Indoor Championships without progressing from round 1. Participating in the 2004 Summer Olympics, he achieved sixth place in his quarter final heat, thus failing to make it through to the semi-final.

His personal best time is 20.69 seconds, achieved in July 2003 in Budapest.

In 2007 Pauer was found guilty of boldenone doping. The sample was delivered on 22 July 2006 in an in-competition test in Debrecen. He received an IAAF suspension from September 2006 to September 2008.

== See also ==
- List of sportspeople sanctioned for doping offences
