= Barbara Oláh =

Hungarian race walker

Personal information
- Born: 26 July 1993 (age 32) Békéscsaba, Hungary
- Education: Wekerle Business School

Sport
- Sport: Track and field
- Event: 20 kilometres race walk

Barbara Oláh (born 26 July 1993), formerly known as Barbara Kovács, is a Hungarian race walker. She competed in the women's 20 kilometres walk event at the 2016 Summer Olympics. In 2018, she competed in the women's 20 kilometres walk event at the 2018 European Athletics Championships held in Berlin, Germany. She finished in 24th place.
