= Wekerle Business School =

Coordinates: 47.485785294422236°N 19.08081637217276°E

Wekerle International University
- Wekerle Sándor Nemzetközi Egyetem (Hungarian) 维克勒商学院 (Chinese)
- Type: Private University
- Established: 2006
- Chancellor: Prof. Dr. Ferenc Bognár
- Location: Budapest, Hungary
- Campus: Urban
- Website: https://wsne.hu/hu/

Chinese name
- Simplified Chinese: 维克勒国际大学
- Traditional Chinese: 維克勒國際大學
Transcriptions
Standard Mandarin
- Hanyu Pinyin: Wéi kè lè guó jì dà xué

Wekerle International University (Hungarian: Wekerle Sándor Nemzetközi Egyetem) is a private university in Budapest, Hungary.

== Programs ==
=== Undergraduate Degree Programmes ===
- BSc in Business Administration and Management
- BSc in Commerce and Marketing
- BSc in Human Resources
- BSc in International Business Economics
- BSc in Finance and Accounting
- BSc in Business Information Technology

=== High-level Vocational Education Programmes ===
- Business Administration and Management at ISCED level 5
- Commerce and Marketing at ISCED level 5
- Human Resource Management at ISCED level 5
- Finance and Account at ISCED level 5
