= Fanni Kövér =

Hungarian athlete

Personal information
- Nationality: Hungarian
- Born: 15 February 2004 (age 22) Budapest

Sport
- Sport: Athletics
- Event: Javelin throw

Achievements and titles
- Personal best(s): Javelin: 58.13m Nyíregyháza, 2023)
Medal record
Women's athletics
Representing Hungary
European Throwing Cup
Silver medal – second place	2026 Nicosia	U23 Javelin
European U20 Championships
Bronze medal – third place	2023 Jerusalem	Javelin

Fanni Kövér (born 15 February 2004) is a Hungarian javelin thrower. She won the Hungarian Athletics Championships in 2024.

== Biography ==
Kövér attended Simonyi Zsigmond Elementary School in Veszprém and started in athletics at the age of ten years-old. A member of Veszprém University and Student Athletics Club (VEDAC) from an early age, Kövér achieved new personal bests in both the javelin and discus throw in July 2020. Her distance in the javelin also set a new Hungarian national youth record with 48.13 meters as a 16-year-old.

The following year, she placed third in the discus at the senior Hungarian Athletics Championships in Debrecen. Kövér placed fourth in the javelin throw at the 2021 European Athletics U20 Championships in Tampere, Finland. In August 2022, Kövér placed fifth overall in the javelin throw at the 2022 World Athletics U20 Championships in Cali, Colombia, with a best throw of 54.38 meters.

In June 2023, she threw 55.55 metres to win the Hungarian U20 Championships title. She subsequently won the bronze medal competing in the javelin throw at the 2023 European Athletics U20 Championships with a best throw 53.09m in Jerusalem, Israel. That summer, she placed second in the javelin at the senior Hungarian Championships and finished the year as the world ranked number two U20 athlete in the discipline. The following year, she won the senior Hungarian Athletics Championships with a throw of 54.87 m in Budapest, in June 2024.

Having joined MTK Budapest at the start of 2025, Köver was a finalist at the 2025 European Athletics U23 Championships in Norway and the 2025 Summer World University Games in Germany.

Köver won the silver medal in the U23 javelin throw at the 2026 European Throwing Cup in Nicosia, Cyprus on 14 March 2026.
