= Janka Molnár =

Hungarian athlete

Personal information
- Nationality: Hungarian
- Born: 5 January 2001 (age 25)

Sport
- Sport: Athletics
- Event: 400m hurdles

Achievements and titles
- Personal bests: 200m: 23.74 (Budapest, 2023); 400m: 51.74 (Chorzów, 2023); 400m hurdles: 56.03 (Debrecen, 2021)

Janka Molnár (born 5 January 2001) is a Hungarian track and field athlete. She has numerous Hungarian national titles over 400m hurdles, as well as 200 metres and 400 metres. She has competed at multiple major championships for Hungary, including the 2023 World Athletics Championships.

== Career ==
A member of BMTE athletics club in Budafok, Budapest. She won her first Hungarian Athletics Championships title over 400 metres in 2018. She won her first Hungarian Indoor Athletics Championships over 400 metres in 2020.

Molnar competed in the 400 metres hurdles at the 2022 European Athletics Championships in Munich, Germany, in August 2022. She also ran as part of the Hungarian team in the women's 4 x 400 metres relay team at the championships.

Molnar, along with Evelin Nádházy, Sára Mátó, and Fanni Rapai, ran a new Hungarian indoor national record in the women's 4 x 400 meters, running 3:37.11 in Nyíregyháza in January 2023. Competing at the 2023 European Team Championships in Silesia, Poland, Molnar set a new personal best time in the 400 metres of 51.74 seconds. She was subsequently selected for the 2023 World Athletics Championships in Budapest in August 2023, named for the 400 metres hurdles, as well as the 4 x 400 metres women's relay and the 4 x 400 metres mixed relay.

She ran as part of the Hungarian mixed 4 x 400 metres relay team at the 2024 World Relays Championships in Nassau, Bahamas. She was selected for the 400 metres hurdles at the 2024 European Athletics Championships in Rome, Italy, but was a late scratch from the race.

In August 2025, she won the Hungarian national 400 metres title in 52.97 seconds at the Hungarian Athletics Championships, and also placed third over 200 metres.

Molnar won the 200 metres title at the 2026 Hungarian Indoor Championships in Nyíregyháza.
