= Sára Mátó =

Hungarian hurdler (born 2000)

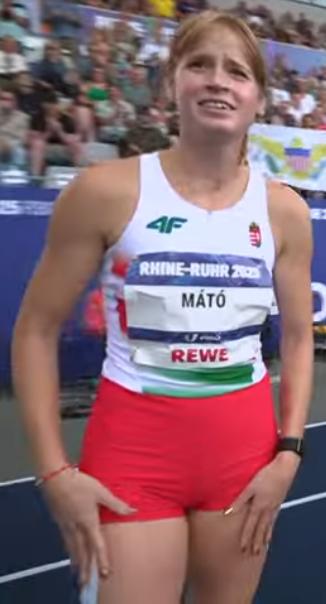
- At the 2025 Summer World University Games

Personal information
- Born: 23 December 2000 (age 25)

Sport
- Sport: Athletics
- Event: 400 metres hurdles
Medal record
Women's athletics
Representing Hungary
Summer World University Games
Bronze medal – third place	2025 Bochum	400m hurdles
Bronze medal – third place	2023 Chengdu	400m hurdles
European U20 Championships
Silver medal – second place	2019 Borås	400 m hurdles

Sára Mátó (born 23 December 2000) is a Hungarian hurdler. She is a multiple-time national champion in the 400 metres hurdles.

== Early life ==
Mátó took part in competitive sports from an early age and was a keen swimmer before focusing on athletics. She studied, majoring in Media and Communication, at Pázmány Péter Catholic University before later studying for a master's degree at Corvinus University of Budapest.

== Career ==
Mátó competed as a member of the ARAK Academy in Székesfehérvár and became the junior national record holder in the 400 metres hurdles. She was a silver medalist at the 2019 European Athletics U20 Championships behind Femke Bol in a national under-20 record time. She was a two-time senior champion in the event at the Hungarian Athletics Championships prior to signing for MTK Budapest in 2021. That year, she improved her personal best to 56.71 seconds, a Hungarian U23 record.

She won a bronze medal at the delayed 2021 Summer World University Games held in Chengdu, China, in the 400 metres hurdles, in August 2023.

She competed for Hungary in the 400 metres hurdles and the 4 x 400 metres relay at the 2024 European Athletics Championships in Rome, Italy, in June 2024, winning her qualifying heat in 55.95 seconds to reach the semi-finals of the 400m hurdles. Later that month, she won the Hungarian national title once again, running 55.47 seconds in Budapest.

She represented Hungary at the 2025 European Athletics Team Championships First Division in Madrid, Spain, in June 2025.

She won the bronze medal in the 400 metres hurdles at the 2025 Summer World University Games in Bochum, Germany. Shortly afterwards, she retained her national title in 55.36 seconds at the Hungarian Athletics Championships.

She competed at the 2025 World Athletics Championships in Tokyo, Japan, running 56.11 seconds without qualifying for the semi-finals.

Competing at the 2026 European Athletics Championships in Birmingham, England, she did not advance to the semi-finals in the 400 metres hurdles. In September, she competed in the 400 m hurdles at the inaugural World Ultimate Championship in Budapest.
