= Hungarian Athletics Association =

Governing body for the sport of athletics in Hungary

Hungarian Athletics Federation
- Sport: Athletics
- Abbreviation: MASZ
- Affiliation: World Athletics
- Regional affiliation: EAA
- Headquarters: Budapest
- President: Miklos Gyulai
- Secretary: Marton Gyulai

Official website
- www.atletika.hu
- (Hungary)

The Hungarian Athletics Association (Hungarian: Magyar Atlétikai Szövetség, pronounced [ˈmɒɟɒr ˈɒtleːtikɒji ˈsøvɛt͡ʃːeːɡ]; MASZ) is the governing body for the sport of athletics in Hungary.

== Affiliations ==
MASZ is the national member federation for Hungary in the following international organisations:

- International Association of Athletics Federations (IAAF)
- European Athletic Association (EAA)
- Hungarian Olympic Committee

Moreover, it is part of the following national organisations:

- Hungarian Olympic Committee (Hungarian: Magyar Olimpiai Bizottság)

== International events hosted ==
- 1966 European Athletics Championships – Budapest, 30 August – 4 September
- 1998 European Athletics Championships – Budapest, 18–23 August
- 1989 IAAF World Indoor Championships – Budapest, 3–5 March
- 2004 IAAF World Indoor Championships – Budapest, 5–7 March
- 1983 European Athletics Indoor Championships – Budapest, 5–6 March
- 1988 European Athletics Indoor Championships – Budapest, 5–6 March

== Medalists ==
=== At Olympic Games ===
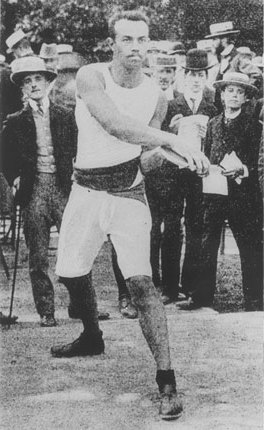
Rudolf Bauer

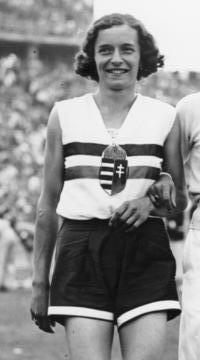
Ibolya Csák

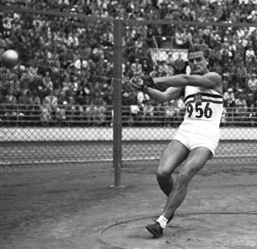
József Csermák

Athlete	Gold	Silver	Bronze	Total
Gyula Zsivótzky (Hammer throw)	1	2	0	3
Imre Németh (Hammer throw)	1	0	1	2
Rudolf Bauer (Discus throw); Ibolya Csák (High jump); Olga Gyarmati (Long jump); József Csermák (Hammer throw); Angéla Németh (Javelin throw); Miklós Németh (Javelin throw); Balázs Kiss (Hammer throw); Krisztián Pars (Hammer throw)	1	0	0	8
Gergely Kulcsár (Javelin throw)	0	1	2	3
Nándor Dáni (800 m); Lajos Gönczy dr. (High jump); Elemér Somfay (Pentathlon); Béla Szepes (Javelin throw); József Kovács (10,000 m); Sándor Rozsnyói (3000 m steeplechase); Márta Antal (Javelin throw); Antal Kiss (50 km walk); Zoltán Kővágó (Discus throw)	0	1	0	9
Alajos Szokolyi (100 m); Gyula Kellner (Marathon); Lajos Gönczy dr. (High jump); Pál Simon, Frigyes Wiesner, József Nagy, Ödön Bodor (Medley relay); Mór Kóczán (Javelin throw); József Várszegi (Javelin throw); Ödön Földessy (Long jump); Antal Róka (50 km walk); László Zarándi, Géza Varasdi, György Csányi, Béla Goldoványi (4 × 100 m relay); István Rózsavölgyi (1500 m); Vilmos Varjú (Shot put); Jolán Kontsek (Discus throw); Annamária Kovács (Pentathlon); Lázár Lovász (Hammer throw)	0	0	1	14

=== At World Championships ===
- IAAF World Championships in Athletics (outdoor)

Athlete	Gold	Silver	Bronze	Total
Krisztián Pars (Hammer throw)	0	2	0	2
István Bagyula (Pole vault); Zsolt Németh (Hammer throw); Adrián Annus (Hammer throw); Róbert Fazekas (Discus throw)	0	1	0	4
Tibor Gécsek (Hammer throw)	0	0	2	2
Attila Horváth (Discus throw); Rita Ináncsi (Heptathlon); Attila Zsivoczky (Decathlon)	0	0	1	3

- IAAF World Indoor Championships in Athletics (indoor)

Athlete	Gold	Silver	Bronze	Total
Xénia Siska (60 m hurdles)	1	0	0	1
Gyula Pálóczi (Long jump); Anita Márton (Shot put)	0	1	0	1
Judit Forgács (400 m); Zsolt Czingler (Triple jump); Zsuzsanna Szabó (Pole vault)	0	0	1	3

- IAAF World Race Walking Cup

Athlete	Gold	Silver	Bronze	Total
István Havasi (50 km walk)	1	0	0	1
Antal Kiss (20 km walk)	0	2	0	2

== Kit suppliers ==
Hungarian kits are currently supplied by Nike.

== Presidents ==
- count Imre Széchenyi (1899–1905)
- Dr. István Bárczy (1907–1918)
- Szilárd Stankovits (1919–1938)
- Dr. Gyula Vangel (1939–1944)
- Lajos Balogh (1945–1946)
- Dr. Elek Szerbák (1947)
- László Rajk (1948–1949)
- János Kelen (1951–1956)
- Dr. Pál Horváth (1957)
- Bertalan Barta (1958–1963)
- Imre Németh (1964–1974)
- Sándor Garai (1975–1980)
- Dr. László Békesi (1981–1988)
- Dr. József Spiegel (1989)
- Ferenc Kaszás (1989–1990)
- Dr. Ágoston Schulek (1991–2001)
- Barna Héder (2001–2002)
- Gusztáv Rábold (2002–2007)
- Dr. Ágoston Schulek (2x) (2008–2009)
- Miklós Gyulai (2009– )

== National records ==
MASZ maintains the Hungarian records in athletics.

== See also ==
- Hungarian Athletics Championships
