= Máté Koroknai =

Hungarian hurdler

Personal information
- Nationality: Hungarian
- Born: Máté Koroknai; 13 January 1993 (age 33)

Sport
- Sport: Track and Field
- Event: 400m hurdles

Máté Koroknai (born 13 January 1993) is a Hungarian athlete specialising in the 400 metres hurdles. He won multiple national championship titles in the discipline, and competed at the 2020 Olympic Games in Tokyo.

== Early life ==
From Debrecen in the Northern Great Plain of Hungary. He attended the University of Debrecen. He then attended the University of Nebraska–Lincoln in the United States, where he studied electric engineering between 2014 and 2017.

== Career ==
In 2014 Koroknai became the Hungarian national champion in the 400 metres hurdles. He retained the title at the 2015 Hungarian Athletics Championships held in August 2015.

in August 2020, he won the 400 metres hurdles title again at the Hungarian Athletics Championships in Budapest, winning in a time of 50.56 seconds. In September 2020, he ran a new personal best time when he ran 49.71 seconds on the 5 September 2020 in Székesfehérvár. It came after he had not long returned to action after a prolonged absence from competing after being ruled out with a serious Achilles’ tendon injury. It proved to be the nineteenth fastest time recorded worldwide during the year, in what was a curtailed season due to the coronavirus pandemic.

He retained his Hungarian national 400 metres hurdles title at the 2021 Hungarian Athletics Championships, held in Debrecen in June 2021, running a time of 49.77 seconds. He qualified for the delayed 2020 Summer Olympics in Tokyo, Japan, he competed in the 400 metre hurdles race. He ran a time of 49.80 seconds in the heats, but did not qualify for the semi-finals.
