= Anasztázia Nguyen =

Hungarian sprinter

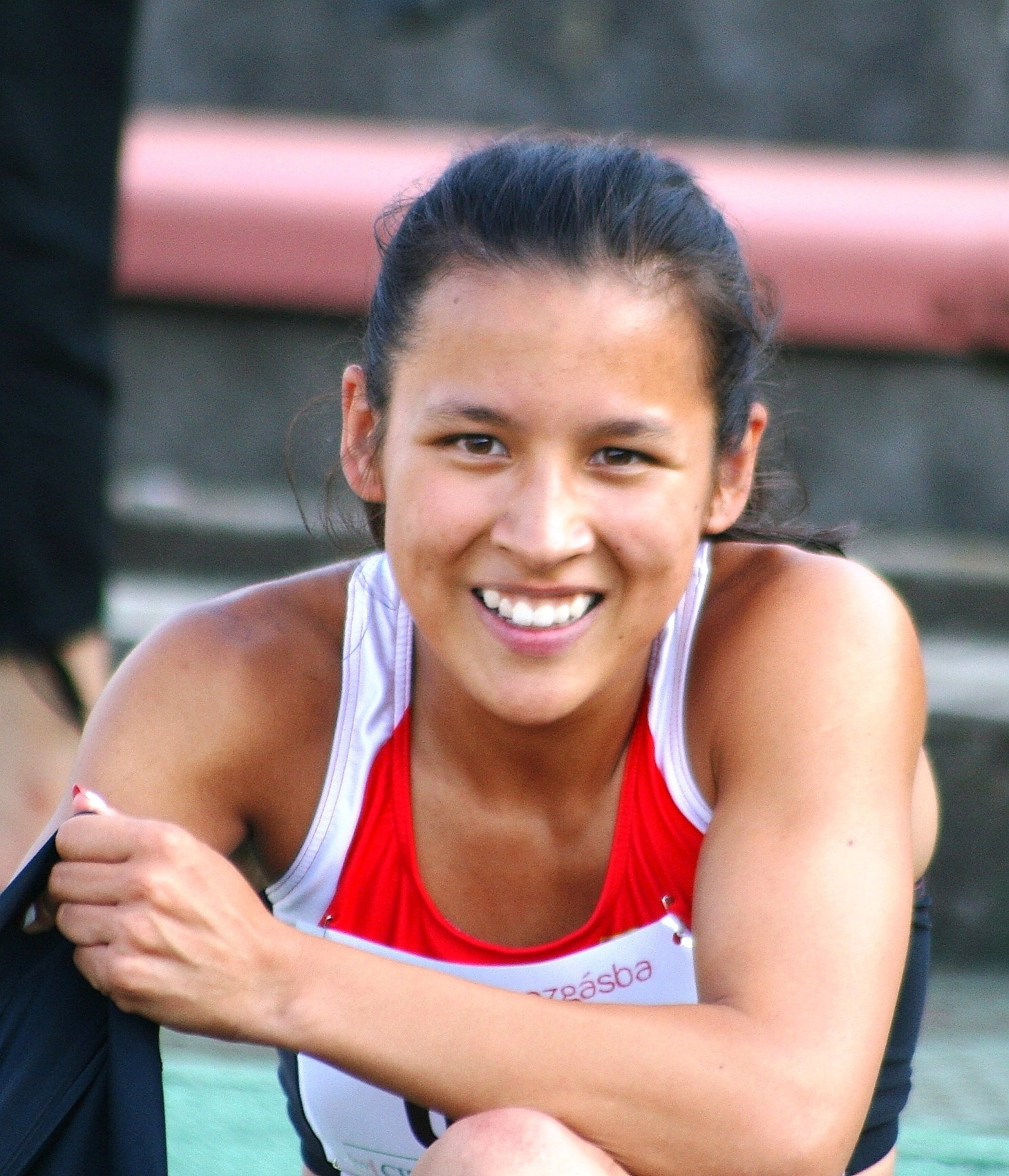
- Nguyen in 2012

Personal information
- Full name: Anasztázia Nguyen
- Nickname: Naszti
- Nationality: Hungarian
- Born: 9 January 1993 (age 33) Budapest, Hungary

Sport
- Country: Hungary
- Sport: Sprint running
- Club: Budapesti Honvéd SE
- Coached by: Dezső Szabó
Medal record
Representing Hungary
Women's athletics
World Youth Championship
| Silver medal – second place | 2009 Brixen | Medley Relay |

Anasztázia Nguyen (born 9 January 1993) is a Hungarian track and field sprinter who specializes in the 60 metres, 100 metres, 200 metres and the long jump.

== Early life and career ==
Nguyen was born in the Hungarian capital Budapest to a Vietnamese father and a Hungarian mother. Her father left the family when Anasztázia was a child and she was brought up by her mother.

She began her career in 2002 by KSI SE under the guidance of former Summer Universiade winner decathlete Dezső Szabó. First she also practiced long jumping and pole vaulting, but eventually decided to concentrate fully on sprint running. In 2009 Szabó switched to Budapesti Honvéd SE to where Nguyen followed her coach.

Among her best results are a silver medal from the 2009 World Youth Championships in medley relay, a seventh place in 100 metres on the same event and a fifth place from the 2010 Summer Youth Olympics also in 100 metres. In addition, Nguyen had won three Hungarian Athletics Championships in 100 metres (2009, 2010, 2011) and one in 200 metres (2011). She also the national junior record in 60 metres (7.40) and in 100 metres (11.55).

For her performances in 2011 she was given the Heraklész Award in the best female athlete category.

At Gyula memorial in 2019 showed a result of 6.70 metres in the long jump.

== Personal bests ==
As of 30 May 2015

| Event | Performance | Venue | Date |
|---|---|---|---|
| 60 metres | 7.32 s | Budapest, Hungary | 21 February 2015 |
| 100 metres | 11.43 s | Budapest, Hungary | 30 May 2015 |
| 200 metres | 23.81 s | Budapest, Hungary | 30 July 2011 |
| long jump | 6.77 m | Budapest, Hungary | 30 July 2019 |
