= Éva Kaptur =

Hungarian sprinter

Personal information
- Nationality: Hungarian
- Born: 15 November 1987 (age 37) Kisvárda, Szabolcs-Szatmár-Bereg, Kádárist Hungary
- Education: Széchenyi István University
- Height: 1.66 m (5 ft 5 in)
- Weight: 54 kg (119 lb)

Sport
- Sport: Athletics
- Event(s): 100 m, 200 m
- Club: Budapest Honvéd
- Coached by: Karlik Pál

Éva Kaptur (born 15 November 1987) is a Hungarian athlete competing in sprinting events.

== International competitions ==
Year	Competition	Venue	Position	Event	Notes
Representing Hungary
2003	World Youth Championships	Sherbrooke, Canada	38th (h)	100 m	12.38
2007	European U23 Championships	Debrecen, Hungary	12th (h)	4 × 100 m relay	46.44
2009	Universiade	Belgrade, Serbia	8th	4 × 100 m relay	46.20
2011	Universiade	Shenzhen, China	22nd (qf)	200 m	12.02
2012	European Championships	Helsinki, Finland	22nd (h)	200 m	24.44
2014	European Championships	Zurich, Switzerland	29th (h)	200 m	24.07
2015	European Indoor Championships	Prague, Czech Republic	26th (h)	60 m	7.46
2015	Universiade	Gwangju, South Korea	14th (sf)	200 m	24.16
2016	European Championships	Amsterdam, Netherlands	13th (h)	4 × 100 m relay	44.34
2018	European Championships	Berlin, Germany	13th (h)	4 × 100 m relay	44.15

== Personal bests ==
Outdoor

- 100 metres – 11.47 (+1.2 m/s, Budapest 2013)
- 200 metres – 23.53 (+1.0 m/s, Budapest 2014)

Indoor

- 60 metres – 7.36 (Budapest 2015)
- 200 metres – 23.99 (Wien 2014)
