= Valdó Szűcs =

Hungarian hurdler

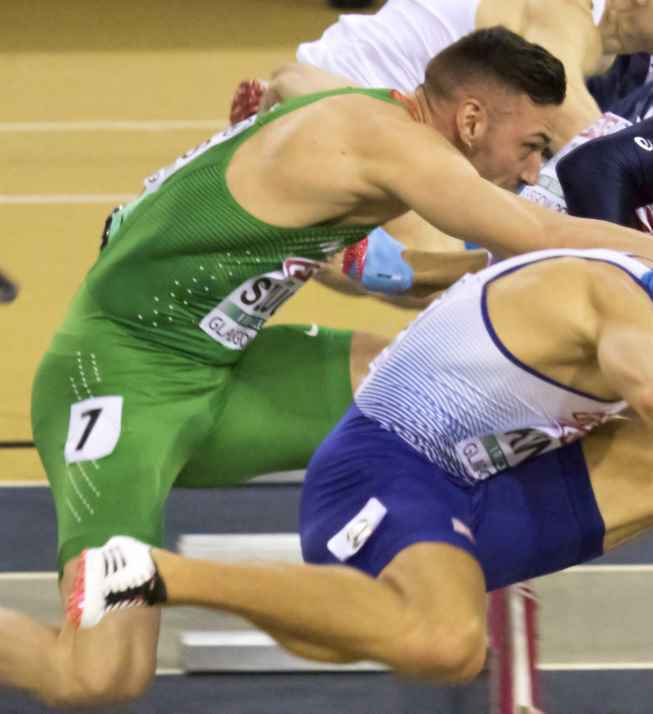
- Valdó Szűcs in 2019

Personal information
- Born: 29 June 1995 (age 31)
- Education: University of Bath
- Height: 195 cm (6 ft 5 in)
- Weight: 89 kg (196 lb)

Sport
- Sport: Athletics
- Events: 110 m hurdles, 60 m hurdles
- Coached by: James Hillier

Valdó Szűcs (born 29 June 1995) is a Hungarian athlete specialising in the high hurdles. He represented his country at the 2020 Olympic Games in Tokyo where he missed out on the final by 0.08 hundredths of a second. He finished 13th place. Also he represented Hungary at one outdoor and two indoor European Championships and one outdoor World Championship (Doha 2019).

His personal bests are 13.38 seconds in the 110 metres hurdles (+1.1 m/s, Debrecen 2021) and 7.56 seconds in the 60 metres hurdles (Budapest 2020).

== International competitions ==
Year	Competition	Venue	Position	Event	Notes
Representing Hungary
2011	World Youth Championships	Lille, France	20th (sf)	110 m hurdles (91.4 cm)	14.45
2011	European Youth Olympic Festival	Trabzon, Turkey	–	110 m hurdles (91.4 cm)	DQ
2012	World Junior Championships	Barcelona, Spain	40th (h)	110 m hurdles (99.0 cm)	14.32
2013	European Junior Championships	Rieti, Italy	20th (h)	110 m hurdles (99.0 cm)	14.07
2014	World Junior Championships	Eugene, United States	14th (sf)	110 m hurdles (99.0 cm)	13.93
2015	European Indoor Championships	Prague, Czech Republic	24th (h)	60 m hurdles	7.97
2015	European U23 Championships	Tallinn, Estonia	8th	110 m hurdles	14.13
2015	European U23 Championships	Tallinn, Estonia	10th (h)	4 × 100 m relay	41.11
2016	European Championships	Zürich, Switzerland	19th (sf)	110 m hurdles	13.76
2019	European Indoor Championships	Glasgow, United Kingdom	12th (sf)	60 m hurdles	7.75
2019	Universiade	Naples, Italy	8th	110 m hurdles	13.77
2019	World Championships	Doha, Qatar	22nd (h)	110 m hurdles	13.60
2021	Olympic Games	Tokyo, Japan	13th (sf)	110 m hurdles	13.40
2022	European Championships	Munich, Germany	18th (sf)	110 m hurdles	13.78
