= Lili Anna Vindics-Tóth =

Hungarian athlete

Personal information
- Nationality: Hungarian
- Born: Lili Anna Tóth; 17 September 1998 (age 28)

Sport
- Sport: Track and Field
- Events: 800m, 1500m, 5000m, 10,000m, 3000m steeplechase

Achievements and titles
- Personal bests: 800m: 2:07.83 (Szekszárd, 2017); 1500m: 4:11.08 (Székesfehérvár, 2023); 5000m: 15:45.67 (Bergen, 2023); 10,000m: 32:48.54 (Burjassot, 2023); 3000m Steeplechase: 9:30.96 (Tokyo, 2021)
Medal record
Women's athletics
Representing Hungary
European Athletics Championships
Silver medal – second place	2026 Birmingham	Marathon

Lili Anna Vindics-Tóth (born 17 September 1998) is a Hungarian middle- and long-distance runner. She is a multiple time Hungarian national champion and won the silver medal at the 2026 European Athletics Championships in the marathon.

== Biography ==
Tóth is from Dombóvár, and competed as a junior winning a gold medal from the 2013 European Youth Olympic Festival (EYOF), a silver from the European Cross Country Junior Championships and a third place from the 2014 Youth Olympics.

She won the Hungarian Athletics Championships in June 2021 in the 3000 metres steeplechase in Debrecen. In July 2021 she was confirmed as part of the Hungarian team for the delayed 2020 Olympic Games in Tokyo, Japan, for the 3000 metres steeplechase. She ran a personal best time at the Olympics of 9:30.96. She won the Hungarian Indoor Athletics Championships over 3000 metres in February 2022, in Nyíregyháza.

She ran a new personal best time of 4:11.87 minutes in the 1500m whilst competing as part of the Hungary team that participated at the 2023 European Team Championships and achieved promotion by winning Division Two.

She was selected for the 2023 World Athletics Championships in Budapest in August 2023 and ran a new personal best time of 4:11.08.

She won the Hungarian Athletics Championships in Budapest in June 2024, in the 5000 metres. She competed the 5000 metres at the 2024 European Athletics Championships in Rome, Italy, but did not finish the race. She set a national record for the mile run on the road of 4:37 in Brasov, Romania in September 2024.

She won the Hungarian Indoor Athletics Championships over 3000 metres in February 2025, in Nyíregyháza. She competed at the 2025 European Athletics Indoor Championships in Apeldoorn, Netherlands over 3000 metres, but did not qualify for the final.

On 16 August 2026, she won the silver medal in the marathon at the 2026 European Athletics Championships in Birmingham, England.

On 27 September 2026, Vindics-Tóth won the women's race in the Warsaw Marathon setting a new record by a woman by achieving 2:24:48. On 11 November, she placed second over 10km at the Warsaw Independence Run.

== Personal life ==
She is a member of the Sports Squadron of the Hungarian Armed Forces. She is married to fellow-athlete Balázs Vindics.
