= Tamás Kazi =

Hungarian middle-distance runner

Personal information
- Nationality: Hungarian
- Born: 16 May 1985 (age 41)

Sport
- Country: Hungary
- Sport: Track and field
- Event: Middle distance running

Achievements and titles
- Personal best: 800 m: 1:45.55

Tamás Kazi (born 16 May 1985) is a Hungarian track and field athlete specialised in middle distance running events. Kazi mainly competes in the 800 metres, in which he participated in the 2009 and 2011 World Championships in Athletics, reaching the semifinal on both occasions. He also competed at the 2012 Summer Olympics in London failing to qualify for the semifinals. He was born in Baja, Hungary.

== Competition record ==
Year	Competition	Venue	Position	Event	Notes
Representing Hungary
2007	European U23 Championships	Debrecen, Hungary	17th (h)	800 m	1:50.58
2007	Universiade	Bangkok, Thailand	15th (sf)	800 m	1:48.98
2009	World Championships	Berlin, Germany	17th (sf)	800 m	1:47.01
2010	European Championships	Barcelona, Spain	16th (h)	800 m	1:50.21
2011	European Indoor Championships	Paris, France	11th (h)	800 m	1:50.85
2011	World Championships	Daegu, South Korea	16th (sf)	800 m	1:46.53
2012	Olympic Games	London, United Kingdom	24th (h)	800 m	1:47.10
2013	European Indoor Championships	Gothenburg, Sweden	18th (h)	800 m	1:51.77
2013	World Championships	Moscow, Russia	16th (sf)	800 m	1:46.40
2014	European Championships	Zürich, Switzerland	11th (sf)	800 m	1:48.04
2015	European Indoor Championships	Prague, Czech Republic	15th (h)	1500 m	3:48.08
2016	European Championships	Amsterdam, Netherlands	28th (h)	1500 m	3:44.64
2017	European Indoor Championships	Belgrade, Serbia	10th (h)	1500 m	3:47.64
2018	European Championships	Berlin, Germany	23rd (h)	800 m	1:48.37
2018	European Championships	Berlin, Germany	18th (h)	1500 m	3:42.98
2019	European Indoor Championships	Glasgow, United Kingdom	23rd (h)	800 m	1:49.66
2021	European Indoor Championships	Toruń, Poland	35th (h)	800 m	1:51.85
