= Hungarian Athletics Championships =

National sports competition

- Most recent season or competition: 2025 Hungarian Athletics Championships
- Sport: Track and field
- Founder: Hungarian Athletics Association
- First season: 1896
- Director: Balázs Csillag
- President: Sándor Juhász

The Hungarian Athletics Championships (Hungarian: Atlétikai Magyar Bajnokság, Országos Bajnokság, magyar bajnokság) are an annual outdoor track and field competition organized and supervised by the Hungarian Athletics Association, which serves as the Hungarian national championships for the sport.

== History ==
The history of competitive athletics in Hungary dates back to 1875, when the Magyar Athletikai Club (MAC) was founded and organized the first public athletics event in the country. MAC continued to hold compeititons in the next decades, and with the growing popularity of the sport they were joined by newly founded clubs which had their own contests and gave out the Hungarian champion title. These, however, were not officially recognized national championships yet and the rules were also not standardized.

The turning point came in 1896, when Hungary celebrated its millennium and as part of the Millenary Feast sports events of great dimensions were held in Budapest in the presence of Emperor Franz Joseph I, attracting over 5,000 athletes. The competition turned out to be a complete success, which gave a big boost to the athletics. A year later, on 21 March 1897 the Hungarian Athletics Association (HAA) was created and two races of the 1896 championship – the 100 yard and the 1 mile event – were approved as official competitions, making Alajos Szokolyi and František Horn the first Hungarian Athletics Championships winners, respectively. Adding long jump and shot put in 1897, and 120 yard hurdles and 440 yard in 1901 to the events' list, MAC continued to organize the championships until 1903, subsequently taken over by the HAA.

== Events ==
Men

- 100 m
- 200 m
- 400 m
- 800 m
- 1500 m
- 5000 m
- 10000 m
- 110 m hurdles
- 400 m hurdles
- 3000 m steeplechase
- 4 × 100 m relay
- 4 × 400 m relay
- High jump
- Pole vault
- Long jump
- Triple jump
- Shot put
- Discus throw
- Hammer throw
- Javelin throw

Women

- 100 m
- 200 m
- 400 m
- 800 m
- 1500 m
- 5000 m
- 10000 m
- 100 m hurdles
- 400 m hurdles
- 3000 m steeplechase
- 4 × 100 m relay
- 4 × 400 m relay
- High jump
- Pole vault
- Long jump
- Triple jump
- Shot put
- Discus throw
- Hammer throw
- Javelin throw

== Venues ==
- 1896 – Budapest
- 1897 – Budapest
- 1898 – Budapest
- 1899 – Budapest
- 1900 – Budapest
- 1901 – Budapest
- 1902 – Budapest
- 1903 – Budapest
- 1904 – Budapest
- 1905 – Budapest
- 1906 – Budapest
- 1907 – Budapest
- 1908 – Budapest
- 1909 – Budapest
- 1910 – Budapest
- 1911 – Budapest
- 1912 – Budapest
- 1913 – Budapest
- 1914 – Budapest
- 1915 – Budapest
- 1916 – Budapest
- 1917 – Budapest
- 1918 – Budapest
- 1919 – Budapest
- 1920 – Budapest
- 1921 – Budapest
- 1922 – Budapest
- 1923 – Budapest
- 1924 – Budapest
- 1925 – Budapest
- 1926 – Budapest
- 1927 – Budapest
- 1928 – Budapest
- 1929 – Budapest
- 1930 – Budapest
- 1931 – Budapest
- 1932 – Budapest
- 1933 – Budapest
- 1934 – Budapest
- 1935 – Budapest
- 1936 – Budapest
- 1937 – Budapest
- 1938 – Budapest
- 1939 – Budapest
- 1940 – Budapest
- 1941 – Budapest
- 1942 – Budapest
- 1943 – Budapest
- 1944 – Budapest
- 1945 – Budapest
- 1946 – Budapest
- 1947 – Budapest
- 1948 – Budapest
- 1949 – Budapest
- 1950 – Budapest
- 1951 – Budapest
- 1952 – Budapest
- 1953 – Budapest
- 1954 – Budapest
- 1955 – Budapest
- 1956 – Budapest
- 1957 – Budapest
- 1958 – Budapest
- 1959 – Budapest
- 1960 – Budapest
- 1961 – Budapest
- 1962 – Budapest
- 1963 – Budapest
- 1964 – Budapest
- 1965 – Budapest
- 1966 – Budapest
- 1967 – Budapest
- 1968 – Budapest
- 1969 – Budapest
- 1970 – Budapest
- 1971 – Budapest
- 1972 – Budapest
- 1973 – Budapest
- 1974 – Budapest
- 1975 – Budapest
- 1976 – Budapest
- 1977 – Budapest
- 1978 – Budapest
- 1979 – Budapest
- 1980 – Budapest
- 1981 – Budapest
- 1982 – Budapest
- 1983 – Budapest
- 1984 – Budapest
- 1985 – Budapest
- 1986 – Budapest
- 1987 – Budapest
- 1988 – Budapest
- 1989 – Budapest
- 1990 – Debrecen
- 1991 – Budapest
- 1992 – Budapest
- 1993 – Budapest
- 1994 – Budapest
- 1995 – Budapest
- 1996 – Budapest
- 1997 – Budapest
- 1998 – Budapest
- 1999 – Budapest
- 2000 – Budapest
- 2001 – Budapest
- 2002 – Budapest
- 2003 – Budapest
- 2004 – Budapest
- 2005 – Budapest
- 2006 – Budapest
- 2007 – Bregyó-köz Athletics Centre, Székesfehérvár
- 2008 – Budapest
- 2009 – Budapest
- 2010 – Budapest
- 2011 – Athletics Center, Szekszárd
- 2012 – Athletics Center, Szekszárd
- 2013 – Budapest
- 2014 – Bregyó-köz Athletics Centre, Székesfehérvár
- 2015 – Bregyó-köz Athletics Centre, Székesfehérvár
- 2016 – Bregyó-köz Athletics Centre, Székesfehérvár
- 2017 – Bregyó-köz Athletics Centre, Székesfehérvár
- 2018 – Bregyó-köz Athletics Centre, Székesfehérvár
- 2019 – Bregyó-köz Athletics Centre, Székesfehérvár
- 2020 – Lantos Mihály Sportközpont, Budapest
- 2021 – Gyulai István Athletic Stadium, Debrecen
- 2022 – Lantos Mihály Sportközpont, Budapest
- 2023 – National Athletics Centre, Budapest
- 2024 – Lantos Mihály Sportközpont, Budapest

== Championships records ==
=== Men ===
Event	Record	Athlete/Team	Date	Meet	Place	Ref.
Shot put	20.56 m NR	Szilárd Kiss	26 July 2002	2002 Championships	Debrecen	
5000 m walk (track)	19:32.59 NR	Máté Helebrandt	8 July 2023	2023 Championships	Budapest	
4 × 800 m relay	7:20.6 h NR	Ferencvárosi TC; János Hrenek; Imre Ötvös; Imre Deák Nagy; Béla Horváth	29 May 1977	1977 Championships	Budapest	
4 × 1500 m relay	15:09.3 h NR	Tatabányai Bányász SC; Gábor Molnár; János Liczul; István Szalai; László Zöld	25 September 1982	1982 Championships	Budapest	

=== Women ===
Event	Record	Athlete/Team	Date	Meet	Place	Ref.
200 m	23.06 (+0.5 m/s) NR	Irén Orosz	29 July 1981	1981 Championships	Budapest	
100 m hurdles	12.72 (−0.1 m/s)	Luca Kozák	8 July 2023	2023 Championships	Budapest	
Pole vault	4.60 m NR	Hanga Klekner	2 August 2025	2025 Championships	Budapest	
4 × 800 m relay	8:35.69 NR	Újpesti Dózsa Sport Club; Márta Gombos; Heléna Barócsi; Andrea Bartakovics; Katalin Rácz	29 May 1988	1988 Championships	Budapest	

== See also ==
- Hungarian Athletics Association
- Lists of Hungarian Athletics Championships champions
