= Zita Kácser =

Hungarian athlete

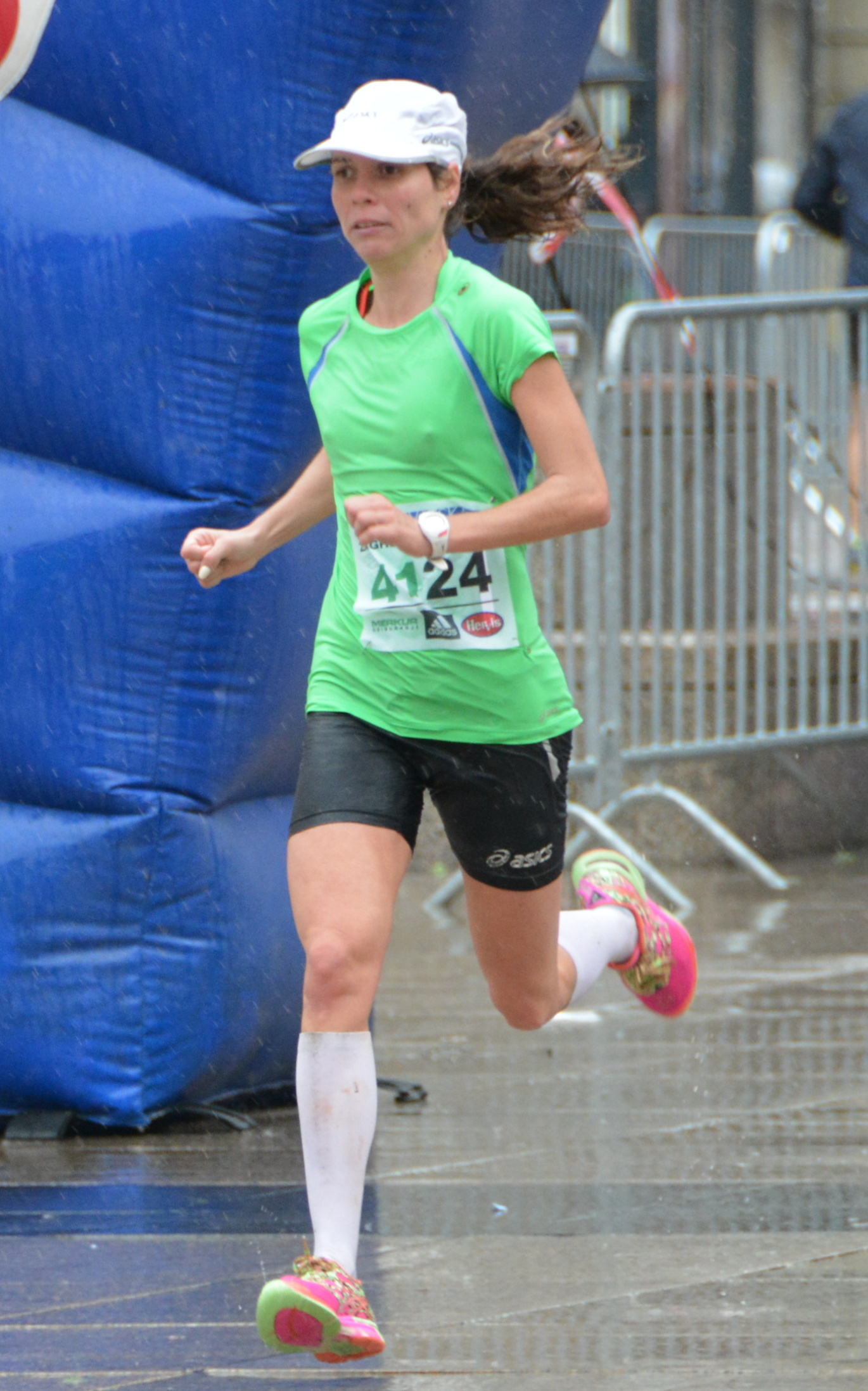
- Kácser in 2015

Personal information
- Nationality: Hungarian
- Born: Zita Kácser; 2 October 1988 (age 37)

Sport
- Sport: Track and Field
- Events: 3000m steeplechase, 5000m, 10,000m, half-marathon

Zita Kácser (born 2 October 1988) is a Hungarian former Olympic distance runner. She also twice represented Hungary at the European Athletics Championships in the 3000 metres steeplechase and competed at the 2020 Olympic Games. A twelve-time Hungarian champion overall, Kácser Zita won national titles twice over 3000m indoors as well as winning multiple titles outdoors. These came in the steeplechase, 5000m, 10,000m and the half-marathon.

== Career ==
A member of DSI Debrecen in Debrecen, Hungary, Kácser recovered from injury to run a national record time in 2019 for the 3000m steeplechase at the Hidegkuti Nándor Stadion in Budapest. At the same time she also met the qualifying standard for the then delayed 2020 Tokyo Olympics. The time of 09:26:59 put her 18th on the IAAF's world rankings. She competed at the 3000m steeplechase in Tokyo. In 2021 she won her tenth national championship outdoor title when she triumphed in the half-marathon in Székesfehérvár. It was her sixth half marathon national title following previous wins in 2015, 2016, 2017, 2018 and 2019. She announced her retirement from international running would come at the end of 2021. After being hired by sports team Diósgyőri VTK as a physiotherapist in 2022 she still competed, and won, the 3000m steeplechase in May 2022 at the Hungarian team championships regional round, helping DVTK qualify for the finals. The victory came despite a fall which caused a wound on her leg to need stitches after the race had finished.

== Post-running career ==
She is a trained physiotherapist. She has worked in the rehabilitation of children. From January 2023, she worked in physiotherapy providing rehabilitation treatment to older patients. She has also completed a course in the recovery from sporting injury.

== International competitions ==
Representing Hungary
Year	Competition	Venue	Position	Event	Result	Notes
2009	European U23 Championships	Kaunas, Lithuania	15th	10,000 m	36:41.33	
2016	European Championships	Amsterdam, Netherlands	26th	3000 m s'chase	10:19.74	14th in heat 1
2017	European Team Championships 2nd League	Tel Aviv, Israel	1st	3000 m s'chase	10:06:80	
2018	European Championships	Berlin, Germany	28th (h)	3000 m s'chase	9:53.36	14th in heat 2
2021	Olympic Games	Tokyo, Japan	41st (h)	3000 m s'chase	10:43.99	
