= Dominik Illovszky =

Hungarian sprinter (born 2002)

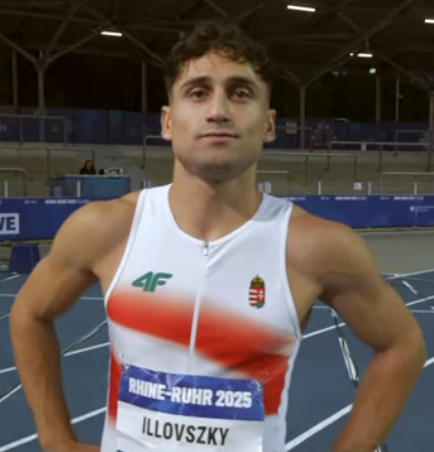
- At the 2025 Summer World University Games

Personal information
- Nationality: Hungarian
- Born: 4 January 2002 (age 24) Budapest, Hungary
- Height: 176 cm (5 ft 9 in)
- Weight: 73 kg (161 lb)

Sport
- Sport: Athletics
- Events: 60m 100m

Achievements and titles
- Personal bests: 60m: 6.52 (2026); 100m: 10.25 (2025)
Medal record
Men's athletics
Representing the Hungary
European U18 Championships
Silver medal – second place	2018 Győr	100 m

Dominik Márk Illovszky (born 4 January 2002) is a Hungarian sprinter. He is a multiple-time national champion over 60 metres and 100 metres. He competed at the 2025 World Athletics Indoor Championships.

== Biography ==
A member of Honvéd club in Budapest, he was capable of running 6.86 seconds for the 60 metres as a 15-year-old. He was a silver medalist over 100 metres at the 2018 European Athletics U18 Championships in Győr.

He won the Hungarian national 60 metres indoor title in 2022, with a personal best time of 6.63 seconds.

He competed for Hungary at the 2023 European Athletics Indoor Championships in Istanbul, where he ran 6.73 seconds in his semi-final but did not proceed to the final. He ran as part of the Hungarian 4x100 metre relay team at the 2023 European Team Championships and at the 2023 World Athletics Championships in Budapest.

He ran 6.65 seconds for the 60 metres in Budapest in February 2025. That month, he lowered his personal best to 6.61 seconds to win the Hungarian national 60m title. He qualified for the semi-finals of the 60 metres at the 2025 European Athletics Indoor Championships in Apeldoorn, finishing second in his heat in a personal best 6.58 seconds, with the same time as the winner, Jeremiah Azu. He was subsequently selected for the 2025 World Athletics Indoor Championships in Nanjing, China in March 2025, where he qualified for the semi-finals with a time of 6.63 seconds. In his semi-final he again ran 6.63 seconds, but did not progress through to the final.

He won the Hungarian national 100 metres title in August 2025, and represented Hungary in the 100 metres at the 2025 Summer World University Games in Germany, where he was a finalist.

Competing in Glasgow in January 2026, he again ran sub-6.60 times for the 60 metres. The following week he ran a personal best at the Sparkassen Indoor Meeting Dortmund, a World Athletics Indoor Tour Bronze meeting, running 6.56 seconds. A few days later he ran a new national record of 6.52 in Belgrade. He ran 6.57 to win the 60 metres title at the 2026 Hungarian Indoor Championships in Nyíregyháza.

Selected for the 60 metres at the 2026 World Athletics Indoor Championships in Toruń, Poland, he reached the semi-finals with a run of 6.58 seconds. He competed in the 100 metres at the 2026 European Athletics Championships in Birmingham, England in August 2026.

== Personal bests ==
Outdoor

- 100 metres – 10.25 (+0.1 m/s, Madrid 2025)
- 200 metres – 21.79 (+2.0 m/s, Miskolc 2022)

Indoor

- 60 metres – 6.52 (Belgrade 2026)

== Personal life ==
Since childhood he has suffered from a rare autoimmune disease that only affects one-in-a-million people. His great uncle is Hungarian former footballer and Hungarian national team football coach Rudolf Illovszky.
