= Tibor Koroknai =

Hungarian hurdler

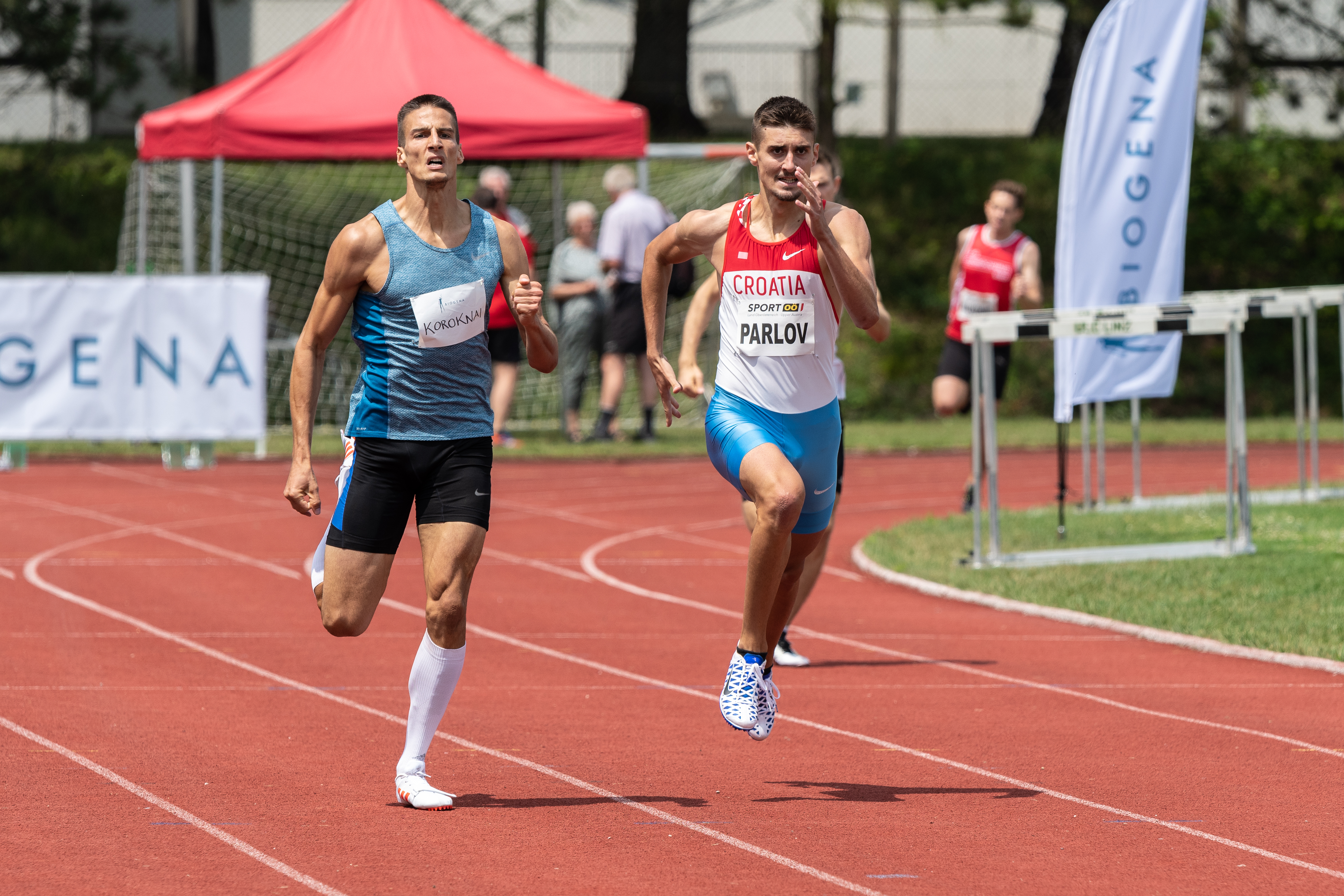
- Tibor Koroknai (left) in 2018

Personal information
- Born: 24 January 1990 (age 36)
- Education: University of Nebraska–Lincoln
- Height: 1.93 m (6 ft 4 in)
- Weight: 82 kg (181 lb)

Sport
- Sport: Athletics
- Event: 400 metres hurdles

Tibor Koroknai (born 24 January 1990) is a Hungarian athlete specialising in the 400 metres hurdles. He represented his country at four consecutive European Championships.

His personal best in the event is 49.24 seconds set in Berlin in 2018.

His younger brother, Máté, is also a hurdler.

== International competitions ==
Year	Competition	Venue	Position	Event	Notes
Representing Hungary
2007	World Youth Championships	Ostrava, Czech Republic	23rd (h)	400 m hurdles (84 cm)	54.08
2008	World Junior Championships	Bydgoszcz, Poland	26th (h)	400 m hurdles	53.33
2009	European Junior Championships	Novi Sad, Serbia	13th (sf)	400 m hurdles	53.97
2009	European Junior Championships	Novi Sad, Serbia	4th	4 × 400 m relay	3:12.63
2011	European U23 Championships	Ostrava, Czech Republic	7th	400 m hurdles	50.28
2012	European Championships	Helsinki, Finland	37th (h)	400 m hurdles	53.22
2013	Universiade	Kazan, Russia	9th (sf)	400 m hurdles	50.61
2014	European Championships	Zürich, Switzerland	25th (h)	400 m hurdles	50.84
2015	Universiade	Gwangju, South Korea	11th (sf)	400 m hurdles	50.63
2016	European Championships	Amsterdam, Netherlands	16th (h)	400 m hurdles	51.32
2018	European Championships	Berlin, Germany	10th (sf)	400 m hurdles	49.24
