= Bianka Bartha-Kéri =

Hungarian middle-distance runner

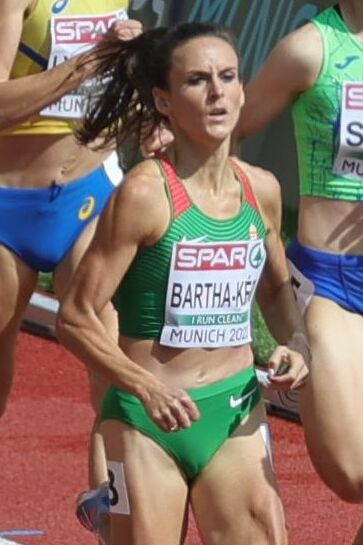

Personal information
- Born: 19 April 1994 (age 32)

Sport
- Country: Hungary
- Sport: Track and field
- Event: 800 metres
Medal record
Women's athletics
Representing Hungary
European Games
Silver medal – second place	2023 Kraków-Małopolska	800 m

Bianka Bartha-Kéri (born 19 April 1994) is a Hungarian middle-distance runner. She competed in the 800 metres at the 2016 European Athletics Championships.
