= Gréta Kerekes =

Hungarian hurdler

Personal information
- Born: 9 October 1992 (age 33) Debrecen, Hungary
- Education: University of Texas at El Paso; University of Nebraska–Lincoln; University of Physical Education in Budapest
- Height: 1.64 m (5 ft 5 in)
- Weight: 53 kg (117 lb)

Sport
- Sport: Athletics
- Event: 100 m hurdles
- College team: UTEP Miners
- Club: DSC-SI
- Coached by: István Tomhauser

Gréta Kerekes (born 9 October 1992 in Debrecen) is a Hungarian athlete specialising in the sprint hurdles. She represented her country at the 2016 World Indoor Championships without qualifying for the final.

She qualified to represent Hungary at the 2024 Summer Olympics.

== Personal best ==
Outdoor
Event	Result	Venue	Date
100 m	11.56 s (wind: -0.1 m/s)	(Hungary) Budapest	27 May 2023
100 m hurdles	12.92 s (wind: -0.5 m/s)	(Hungary) Székesfehérvár	18 July 2023

Indoor
60 m	7.39 s	(Hungary) Budapest	19 January 2019
60 m hurdles	7.96 s	(Hungary) Nyíregyháza	18 February 2024

== Competition record ==
Year	Competition	Venue	Position	Event	Notes
Representing Hungary
2009	World Youth Championships	Brixen, Italy	28th (h)	100 m h (76.2 cm)	14.39
2009	European Youth Olympic Festival	Tampere, Finland	14th (h)	100 m h (76.2 cm)	14.15
2009	European Youth Olympic Festival	Tampere, Finland	2nd	4 × 100 m relay	46.38
2010	World Junior Championships	Moncton, Canada	–	100 m hurdles	DNF
2010	World Junior Championships	Moncton, Canada	12th (h)	4 × 100 m relay	45.77
2011	European Junior Championships	Tallinn, Estonia	11th (sf)	100 m hurdles	14.07
2011	European Junior Championships	Tallinn, Estonia	6th	4 × 100 m relay	45.24
2015	Universiade	Barcelona, Spain	17th (h)	100 m hurdles	14.23
2016	World Indoor Championships	Portland, United States	16th (h)	60 m hurdles	8.37
2016	European Championships	Amsterdam, Netherlands	25th (h)	100 m hurdles	13.54
2016	European Championships	Amsterdam, Netherlands	13th (h)	4 × 100 m relay	44.34
2017	European Indoor Championships	Belgrade, Serbia	12th (sf)	60 m hurdles	8.23
2017	World Championships	London, United Kingdom	26th (h)	100 m hurdles	13.15
2017	Universiade	Taipei, Taiwan	6th	100 m hurdles	13.38
2018	World Indoor Championships	Birmingham, United Kingdom	17th (sf)	60 m hurdles	8.17
2018	European Championships	Berlin, Germany	20th (sf)	100 m hurdles	13.23
2018	European Championships	Berlin, Germany	13th (h)	4 × 100 m relay	44.15
2019	European Indoor Championships	Glasgow, United Kingdom	5th	60 m hurdles	8.03
2019	World Championships	Doha, Qatar	24th (h)	100 m hurdles	13.11
2021	European Indoor Championships	Toruń, Poland	25th (h)	60 m hurdles	8.21
2023	European Indoor Championships	Istanbul, Turkey	7th	60 m hurdles	8.03
2023	World Championships	Budapest, Hungary	32nd (h)	100 m hurdles	13.09
2023	World Championships	Budapest, Hungary	13th (h)	4 × 100 m relay	43.38
2024	World Indoor Championships	Glasgow, United Kingdom	17th (sf)	60 m hurdles	8.07
2024	European Championships	Rome, Italy	18th (sf)	100 m hurdles	13.05
2024	European Championships	Rome, Italy	11th (h)	4 × 100 m relay	43.70
2024	Olympic Games	Paris, France	17th (rep)	100 m hurdles	13.20
