= Hungary at the 2026 European Athletics Championships =

- Flag of Hungary
- WA code: HUN
- National federation: Hungarian Athletics Association

in Birmingham, United Kingdom 10–16 August 2026
- Competitors: 52 (27 men and 25 women)
- Medals: Gold 1 Silver 1 Bronze 0 Total 2

European Athletics Championships appearances
- 1934; 1938; 1946; 1950; 1954; 1958; 1962; 1966; 1969; 1971; 1974; 1978; 1982; 1986; 1990; 1994; 1998; 2002; 2006; 2010; 2012; 2014; 2016; 2018; 2022; 2024; 2026

Hungary competed at the 2026 European Athletics Championships in Birmingham, United Kingdom from 10–16 August 2026.

== Medallists ==
Medal	Name	Event	Date
Gold	Bence Halász	Men's hammer throw	11 August
Silver	Lili Anna Vindics-Tóth	Women's marathon	16 August

== Results ==
Hungary entered the following athletes.

Key

- Q = Qualified for the next round
- q = Qualified for the next round as a fastest loser or, in field events, by position without achieving the qualifying target
- NR = National record
- PB = Personal best
- SB = Season best
- N/A = Round not applicable for the event

=== Men ===
Track and road events

Athlete	Event	Heat		Semifinal		Final	
Athlete	Event	Result	Rank	Result	Rank	Result	Rank
Dominik Illovszky	100 m	10.79	24	Did not advance			
Patrik Simon Enyingi	400 m	44.87 SB	1 q	45.02	2 Q	45.36	7
Attila Molnár	400 m	Bye		44.60	2 Q	44.55	4
Ádám Lomb	Marathon	—N/a				2:16:15	27
Levente Szemerei	Marathon	—N/a				2:18:27	33
László Tarnai	Marathon	—N/a				2:30:12 SB	51
Dániel Eszes	110 m hurdles	14.18	19	Did not advance			
Árpád Bánóczy	400 m hurdles	50.78	21	—N/a			
Csaba Molnár	400 m hurdles	50.85	23	—N/a			
István Palkovits	3000 m steeplechase	8:59.72	31	—N/a		Did not advance	
Máté Helebrandt	Marathon walk	—N/a				3:09:22 SB	16
Norbert Tóth	Marathon walk	—N/a				3:05:43 PB	11
Bence Venyercsán	Marathon walk	—N/a				3:01:18 NR	6
Árpád Kovács; Balázs Plisz; Csanád Csahóczi*; Attila Molnár; Patrik Simon Enyingi**	4 × 400 m relay	3:01.24 NR	5 q	—N/a		2:59.68 NR	5

* Indicates the athlete only competed in the preliminary heat. ** Indicates the athlete only competed in the final.

Field events

Athlete	Event	Qualification		Final	
Athlete	Event	Distance	Position	Distance	Position
Kristóf Pap	Long jump	NM		Did not advance	
Dániel Szenderffy	Triple jump	16.06	12 Q	15.88	10
János Huszák	Discus throw	54.95	29	Did not advance	
Róbert Szikszai	Discus throw	55.54	26	Did not advance	
Bence Halász	Hammer throw	79.58	2 Q	84.25 WL NR	1st place, gold medalist(s)
Ármin Szabados	Hammer throw	77.08	6 q	76.91	8
Gábor Czeller	Hammer throw	70.47	26	Did not advance	

Combined events – Decathlon

Athlete	Event	100 m	LJ	SP	HJ	400 m	110H	DT	PV	JT	1500 m	Final	Rank
Zsombor Gálpál	Result	10.96 (13)	6.46 (25)	14.56 (11)	1.87 (25)	48.42 (14)	Did not start					DNF	21
Zsombor Gálpál	Points	870	688	763	687	889	—					DNF	21

=== Women ===
Track and road events

Athlete	Event	Heat		Semifinal		Final	
Athlete	Event	Result	Rank	Result	Rank	Result	Rank
Boglárka Takács	100 m	10.93^{[W]}	1 q	11.13^{[W]} SB	3	Did not advance	
Boglárka Takács	200 m	22.84 SB	1	22.77 SB	8 q	22.82	8
Réka Körmendi	Marathon	—N/a				3:02:59	48
Nóra Szabó	Marathon	—N/a				2:27:39 SB	4
Kata Tomaschof	Marathon	—N/a				2:43:07 PB	42
Lili Anna Vindics-Tóth	Marathon	—N/a				2:27:21 PB	2nd place, silver medalist(s)
Luca Kozák	100 m hurdles	Bye		12.83	5 Q	12.84	5
Anna Tóth	100 m hurdles	13.04	13	Did not undertake^{[R]}			
Sára Mátó	400 m hurdles	56.82	19	Did not advance			
Zita Urbán	3000 m steeplechase	9:35:57 PB	7 Q	—N/a		9:52.49	15
Alexandra Kovács	Half marathon walk	—N/a				1:41:45 PB	23
Tiziana Spiller	Half marathon walk	—N/a				1:35:32 NR	10
Zita Szentgyörgyi; Boglárka Takács; Luca Kozák; Lili Hanna Brucker	4 × 100 m relay	42.84 NR	5 Q	—N/a		43.33	6

Wind: (+3.2 m/s)
Wind: (+0.9 m/s)
On August 10, Tóth finished 13th in the preliminary heat with a time of 13.04 seconds, three hundredths of a second short of the qualifying 12th place. On August 11, she was eliminated from the semifinals due to a setback. After consulting with doctors on August 11, the athlete, together with the Hungarian professional team, decided not to compete in the semifinals. However, she can still run in the women's 4×100 meter relay.

Field events

Athlete	Event	Qualification		Final	
Athlete	Event	Distance	Position	Distance	Position
Lilianna Bátori	High jump	1.88	21	Did not advance	
Hanga Klekner	Pole vault	4.40	12 q	4.45	7
Petra Bánhidi-Farkas	Long jump	6.55	16	Did not advance	
Renáta Beregszászi	Shot put	16.09	20	Did not advance	
Dóra Kerekes	Discus throw	54.02	23	Did not advance	
Jázmin Csatári	Hammer throw	64.55	23	Did not advance	
Zsanett Németh	Hammer throw	66.11	17	Did not advance	
Annabella Bogdán	Javelin throw	54.35	22	Did not advance	

Combined events – Heptathlon

Athlete	Event	100H	HJ	SP	200 m	LJ	JT	800 m	Final	Rank
Sarolta Kriszt	Result	13.38 SB (12)	1.71 SB (14)	13.26 PB (16)	23.58 (6)	6.44 (6)	46.67 (6)	2:12.93 (6)	6407	6
Sarolta Kriszt	Points	1068	867	745	1021	988	796	922	6407	6
Szabina Szűcs	Result	13.60 SB (17)	1.74 (9)	13.23 (18)	24.57 (19)	NM	39.44 (18)	DNS	4266	DNF
Szabina Szűcs	Points	1036	903	743	927	0	657	0	4266	DNF
