= 2003 European Athletics U23 Championships – Men's 110 metres hurdles =

The men's 110 metres hurdles event at the 2003 European Athletics U23 Championships was held in Bydgoszcz, Poland, at Zawisza Stadion on 18 and 20 July.

== Medalists ==
Gold	Ladji Doucouré; France
Silver	Philip Nossmy; Sweden
Bronze	Gregory Sedoc; Netherlands

== Results ==
=== Final ===
20 July
Wind: 0.6 m/s

Rank	Name	Nationality	Time	Notes
1st place, gold medalist(s)	Ladji Doucouré	France	13.25	
2nd place, silver medalist(s)	Philip Nossmy	Sweden	13.50	
3rd place, bronze medalist(s)	Gregory Sedoc	Netherlands	13.55	
4	Jurica Grabušić	Croatia	13.60	
5	Robert Newton	Great Britain	13.61	
6	Sergey Chepiga	Russia	13.63	
7	Igor Peremota	Russia	13.70	
8	Nenad Lončar	Serbia and Montenegro	13.80	

=== Semifinals ===
20 July
Qualified: first 4 in each to the Final

==== Semifinal 1 ====
Wind: 1.9 m/s

Rank	Name	Nationality	Time	Notes
1	Ladji Doucouré	France	13.23	Q, CR
2	Jurica Grabušić	Croatia	13.54	Q
3	Nenad Lončar	Serbia and Montenegro	13.60	Q
4	Igor Peremota	Russia	13.72	Q
5	Thomas Blaschek	Germany	13.77	
6	Dániel Kiss	Hungary	13.89	
7	Serhiy Demydyuk	Ukraine	13.92	
8	Virgil Spier	Netherlands	14.02	

==== Semifinal 2 ====
Wind: 0.6 m/s

Rank	Name	Nationality	Time	Notes
1	Gregory Sedoc	Netherlands	13.58	Q
2	Philip Nossmy	Sweden	13.60	Q
3	Sergey Chepiga	Russia	13.64	Q
4	Robert Newton	Great Britain	13.71	Q
5	David Ilariani	Georgia	13.75	
6	Juha Sonck	Finland	13.94	
7	Bartłomiej Szymański	Poland	13.99	
	Jan Čech	Czech Republic	DQ	

=== Heats ===
18 July
Qualified: first 3 in each heat and 4 best to the Semifinal

==== Heat 1 ====
Wind: 2.9 m/s

Rank	Name	Nationality	Time	Notes
1	Ladji Doucouré	France	13.59 w	Q
2	Gregory Sedoc	Netherlands	13.59 w	Q
3	Sergey Chepiga	Russia	13.59 w	Q
4	David Ilariani	Georgia	13.78 w	q
5	Dániel Kiss	Hungary	13.80 w	q
6	Stanislav Sajdok	Czech Republic	14.02 w	
7	Mariusz Kubaszewski	Poland	14.25 w	
8	Andrei Shalonka	Belarus	14.56 w	

==== Heat 2 ====
Wind: 0.5 m/s

Rank	Name	Nationality	Time	Notes
1	Philip Nossmy	Sweden	13.70	Q
2	Virgil Spier	Netherlands	13.79	Q
3	Igor Peremota	Russia	13.93	Q
4	Markus Vilén	Finland	14.06	
5	Alexandru Mihailescu	Romania	14.16	
6	Cédric Beyera	France	14.23	
7	Chris Baillie	Great Britain	14.29	
8	Daniel Buttari	Italy	14.33	

==== Heat 3 ====
Wind: 0.8 m/s

Rank	Name	Nationality	Time	Notes
1	Jurica Grabušić	Croatia	13.61	Q
2	Bartłomiej Szymański	Poland	13.90	Q
3	Juha Sonck	Finland	13.98	Q
4	Carlo Alberto Mainini	Italy	14.21	
5	Sebastian Siebert	Germany	14.22	
6	Elton Bitincka	Albania	14.60	
	Mario Alcolea	Spain	DNS	

==== Heat 4 ====
Wind: -0.4 m/s

Rank	Name	Nationality	Time	Notes
1	Robert Newton	Great Britain	13.55	Q
2	Nenad Lončar	Serbia and Montenegro	13.78	Q
3	Thomas Blaschek	Germany	13.87	Q
4	Serhiy Demydyuk	Ukraine	13.95	q
5	Jan Čech	Czech Republic	14.00	q
6	Willy Monfret	France	14.08	
7	Damien Broothaerts	Belgium	14.24	
8	Jürg Egger	Switzerland	14.43	

== Participation ==
According to an unofficial count, 30 athletes from 20 countries participated in the event.

- Albania (1)
- Belarus (1)
- Belgium (1)
- Croatia (1)
- Czech Republic (2)
- Finland (2)
- France (3)
- Georgia (1)
- Germany (2)
- Great Britain (2)
- Hungary (1)
- Italy (2)
- Netherlands (2)
- Poland (2)
- Romania (1)
- Russia (2)
- Serbia and Montenegro (1)
- Sweden (1)
- Switzerland (1)
- Ukraine (1)
