= 2010 European Athletics Championships – Men's 110 metres hurdles =

Men's 110 metres hurdles at the European Athletics Championships

The men's 110 metres hurdles at the 2010 European Athletics Championships was held at the Estadi Olímpic Lluís Companys on 29 and 30 July.

== Medalists ==
Gold	(United Kingdom) Andy Turner; Great Britain (GBR)
Silver	Garfield Darien; France (FRA)
Bronze	Dániel Kiss; Hungary (HUN)

== Records ==
Standing records prior to the 2010 European Athletics Championships
World record	Dayron Robles (CUB)	12.87	Ostrava, Czech Republic	12 June 2008
European record	Colin Jackson (GBR)	12.91	Stuttgart, Germany	20 August 1993
Championship record	Colin Jackson (GBR)	13.02	Budapest, Hungary	22 August 1998
World Leading	David Oliver (USA)	12.89	Saint-Denis, France	16 July 2010
European Leading	Petr Svoboda (CZE)	13.27	Prague, Czech Republic	14 June 2010

== Schedule ==
Date	Time	Round
29 July 2010	10:45	Round 1
30 July 2010	18:35	Semifinals
30 July 2010	19:50	Final

== Results ==
=== Round 1 ===
First 3 in each heat (Q) and 4 best performers (q) advance to the Semifinals.

==== Heat 1 ====
Rank	Lane	Name	Nationality	React	Time	Notes
1	8	Dimitri Bascou	France	0.146	13.65	Q
2	3	Artur Noga	Poland	0.194	13.68	Q
3	2	Jackson Quiñónez	Spain	0.185	13.78	Q
4	6	Konstadinos Douvalidis	Greece	0.181	13.80	
5	5	Gregory Sedoc	Netherlands	0.197	13.95	
6	7	Stefano Tedesco	Italy	0.156	13.96	
7	4	Balázs Baji	Hungary	0.153	14.01	
				Wind: -1.8 m/s		

==== Heat 2 ====
Rank	Lane	Name	Nationality	React	Time	Notes
1	1	Andy Turner	Great Britain & N.I.	0.145	13.48	Q
2	4	Philip Nossmy	Sweden	0.124	13.71	Q
3	3	Ladji Doucouré	France	0.201	13.82	Q
4	6	Martin Mazáč	Czech Republic	0.154	13.87	
5	8	Alexandru Mihailescu	Romania	0.151	13.99	
6	7	Alexandros Stavrides	Cyprus	0.189	14.04	SB
7	5	Francisco Javier López	Spain	0.201	14.15	
	2	Staņislavs Olijars	Latvia		DQ	
				Wind: -1.1 m/s		

==== Heat 3 ====
Rank	Lane	Name	Nationality	React	Time	Notes
1	7	Petr Svoboda	Czech Republic	0.180	13.50	Q
2	4	Marcel van der Westen	Netherlands	0.146	13.58	Q, SB
3	3	William Sharman	Great Britain & N.I.	0.165	13.60	Q
4	5	Alexander John	Germany	0.174	13.61	q
5	2	Konstantin Shabanov	Russia	0.179	13.73	SB
6	8	Felipe Vivancos	Spain	0.222	13.82	
7	6	Juha Sonck	Finland	0.101	13.88	
				Wind: +0.2 m/s		

==== Heat 4 ====
Rank	Lane	Name	Nationality	React	Time	
1	5	Dániel Kiss	Hungary	0.177	13.44	Q
2	3	Garfield Darien	France	0.187	13.50	Q
3	8	Dominik Bochenek	Poland	0.145	13.58	Q
4	4	Matthias Bühler	Germany	0.141	13.62	q
5	6	Maksim Lynsha	Belarus	0.197	13.65	q, SB
6	7	Jurica Grabušić	Croatia	0.153	13.69	q
	2	Mantas Šilkauskas	Lithuania	0.157	DQ	
	1	David Ilariani	Georgia		DNS	
				Wind: -0.5 m/s		

==== Summary ====
Rank	Heat	Lane	Name	Nationality	React	Time	Notes
1	4	5	Dániel Kiss	Hungary		13.44	Q
2	2	1	Andy Turner	Great Britain & N.I.		13.48	Q
3	4	3	Garfield Darien	France		13.50	Q
3	3	7	Petr Svoboda	Czech Republic		13.50	Q
5	4	8	Dominik Bochenek	Poland		13.58	Q
5	3	4	Marcel van der Westen	Netherlands		13.58	Q, SB
7	3	3	William Sharman	Great Britain & N.I.		13.60	Q
8	3	5	Alexander John	Germany		13.61	q
9	4	4	Matthias Bühler	Germany		13.62	q
10	1	8	Dimitri Bascou	France		13.65	Q
10	4	6	Maksim Lynsha	Belarus		13.65	q, SB
12	1	3	Artur Noga	Poland		13.68	Q
13	4	7	Jurica Grabušić	Croatia		13.69	q
14	2	4	Philip Nossmy	Sweden		13.71	Q
15	3	2	Konstantin Shabanov	Russia		13.73	SB
16	1	2	Jackson Quiñónez	Spain		13.78	Q
17	1	6	Konstadinos Douvalidis	Greece		13.80	
18	2	3	Ladji Doucouré	France		13.82	Q
18	3	8	Felipe Vivancos	Spain		13.82	
20	2	6	Martin Mazáč	Czech Republic		13.87	
21	3	6	Juha Sonck	Finland		13.88	
22	1	5	Gregory Sedoc	Netherlands		13.95	
23	1	7	Stefano Tedesco	Italy		13.96	
24	2	8	Alexandru Mihailescu	Romania		13.99	
25	1	4	Balázs Baji	Hungary		14.01	
26	2	7	Alexandros Stavrides	Cyprus		14.04	SB
27	2	5	Francisco Javier López	Spain		14.15	
	2	2	Staņislavs Olijars	Latvia		DQ	
	4	2	Mantas Šilkauskas	Lithuania		DQ	
	4	1	David Ilariani	Georgia		DNS	

=== Semifinals ===
==== Semifinal 1 ====
Rank	Lane	Name	Nationality	React	Time	Notes
1	3	Garfield Darien	France	0.201	13.39	Q, SB
2	5	Dániel Kiss	Hungary	0.159	13.47	Q
3	1	Alexander John	Germany	0.159	13.56	Q
4	6	Dimitri Bascou	France	0.153	13.57	q
5	4	Philip Nossmy	Sweden	0.151	13.87	
6	7	Dominik Bochenek	Poland	0.149	14.13	
	2	Jurica Grabušić	Croatia	0.150	DNF	
	8	William Sharman	Great Britain & N.I.		DQ	
				Wind: -1.4 m/s		

==== Semifinal 2 ====
Rank	Lane	Name	Nationality	React	Time	Notes
1	4	Petr Svoboda	Czech Republic	0.170	13.44	Q
2	5	Andy Turner	Great Britain & N.I.	0.167	13.50	Q
3	6	Artur Noga	Poland	0.199	13.53	Q
4	3	Marcel van der Westen	Netherlands	0.135	13.56	q, SB
5	1	Maksim Lynsha	Belarus	0.191	13.68	
6	8	Ladji Doucouré	France	0.166	13.80	
7	2	Matthias Bühler	Germany	0.150	13.99	
8	7	Jackson Quiñónez	Spain	0.238	14.03	
				Wind: -0.7 m/s		

==== Summary ====
Rank	Heat	Lane	Name	Nationality	React	Time	Notes
1	1	3	Garfield Darien	France	0.201	13.39	Q, SB
2	2	4	Petr Svoboda	Czech Republic	0.170	13.44	Q
3	1	5	Dániel Kiss	Hungary	0.159	13.47	Q
4	2	5	Andy Turner	Great Britain & N.I.	0.167	13.50	Q
5	2	6	Artur Noga	Poland	0.199	13.53	Q
6	1	1	Alexander John	Germany	0.159	13.56	Q
6	2	3	Marcel van der Westen	Netherlands	0.135	13.56	q, SB
8	1	6	Dimitri Bascou	France	0.153	13.57	q
9	2	1	Maksim Lynsha	Belarus	0.191	13.68	
10	2	8	Ladji Doucouré	France	0.166	13.80	
11	1	4	Philip Nossmy	Sweden	0.151	13.87	
12	2	2	Matthias Bühler	Germany	0.150	13.99	
13	2	7	Jackson Quiñónez	Spain	0.238	14.03	
14	1	7	Dominik Bochenek	Poland	0.149	14.13	
	1	2	Jurica Grabušić	Croatia	0.150	DNF	
	1	8	William Sharman	Great Britain & N.I.		DQ	

=== Final ===
Rank	Lane	Athlete	Nationality	React	Time	Notes
1st place, gold medalist(s)	5	Andy Turner	Great Britain & N.I.	0.150	13.28	SB
2nd place, silver medalist(s)	3	Garfield Darien	France	0.203	13.34	PB
3rd place, bronze medalist(s)	6	Dániel Kiss	Hungary	0.157	13.39	
4	2	Dimitri Bascou	France	0.141	13.41	PB
5	7	Artur Noga	Poland	0.183	13.44	
6	4	Petr Svoboda	Czech Republic	0.149	13.57	
7	1	Marcel van der Westen	Netherlands	0.147	13.58	
8	8	Alexander John	Germany		13.71	
				Wind: -1.0 m/s		
