= 2001 European Athletics U23 Championships – Men's 110 metres hurdles =

The men's 110 metres hurdles event at the 2001 European Athletics U23 Championships was held in Amsterdam, Netherlands, at Olympisch Stadion on 14 and 15 July.

== Medalists ==
Gold	Artur Budziłło; Poland
Silver	Felipe Vivancos; Spain
Bronze	Chris Baillie; United Kingdom

== Results ==
=== Final ===
15 July
Wind: 0.4 m/s

Rank	Name	Nationality	Time	Notes
1st place, gold medalist(s)	Artur Budziłło	Poland	13.76	
2nd place, silver medalist(s)	Felipe Vivancos	Spain	13.79	
3rd place, bronze medalist(s)	Chris Baillie	United Kingdom	13.85	
4	Rafał Lis	Poland	13.93	
5	Nenad Lončar	Yugoslavia	13.94	
6	Cédric Lavanne	France	13.96	
7	Nikolay Koykov	Bulgaria	14.08	
8	Marko Ritola	Finland	14.14	

=== Heats ===
14 July
Qualified: first 2 in each heat and 2 best to the Final

==== Heat 1 ====
Wind: 0.4 m/s

Rank	Name	Nationality	Time	Notes
1	Rafał Lis	Poland	14.06	Q
2	Nenad Lončar	Yugoslavia	14.07	Q
3	Nikolay Koykov	Bulgaria	14.08	q
4	Thomas Martin	France	14.11	
5	Dimitrios Pietris	Greece	14.19	
6	Tarmo Jallai	Estonia	14.60	

==== Heat 2 ====
Wind: 1.2 m/s

Rank	Name	Nationality	Time	Notes
1	Felipe Vivancos	Spain	13.85	Q
2	Chris Baillie	United Kingdom	14.03	Q
3	Marko Ritola	Finland	14.08	q
4	Thomas Blaschek	Germany	14.17	
5	Marc Gerber	France	14.57	
6	Gregory Sedoc	Netherlands	DNF	

==== Heat 3 ====
Wind: 0.4 m/s

Rank	Name	Nationality	Time	Notes
1	Cédric Lavanne	France	13.98	Q
2	Artur Budziłło	Poland	13.00	Q
3	Robert Newton	United Kingdom	14.09	
4	Gergely Palágyi	Hungary	14.12	
5	Justin Dyett	Germany	14.27	
6	Vytautas Kancleris	Lithuania	14.54	
7	Salih Keljalić	Bosnia and Herzegovina	14.63	

== Participation ==
According to an unofficial count, 19 athletes from 14 countries participated in the event.

- Bosnia and Herzegovina (1)
- Bulgaria (1)
- Estonia (1)
- Finland (1)
- France (3)
- Germany (2)
- Greece (1)
- Hungary (1)
- Lithuania (1)
- Netherlands (1)
- Poland (2)
- Spain (1)
- United Kingdom (2)
- Yugoslavia (1)
