= 2000 World Junior Championships in Athletics – Men's 110 metres hurdles =

The men's 110 metres hurdles event at the 2000 World Junior Championships in Athletics was held in Santiago, Chile, at Estadio Nacional Julio Martínez Prádanos on 18, 19 and 20 October. 106.7 cm (3'6) (senior implement) hurdles were used.

== Medalists ==
Gold	Yuniel Hernández; Cuba
Silver	Thomas Blaschek; Germany
Bronze	Ladji Doucouré; France

== Results ==
=== Final ===
20 October
Wind: -0.1 m/s

Rank	Name	Nationality	Time	Notes
1st place, gold medalist(s)	Yuniel Hernández	Cuba	13.60	
2nd place, silver medalist(s)	Thomas Blaschek	Germany	13.80	
3rd place, bronze medalist(s)	Ladji Doucouré	France	13.84	
4	Liu Xiang	China	13.87	
5	Philip Nossmy	Sweden	13.92	
6	Nassim Brahimi	Qatar	14.14	
7	Robert Newton	United Kingdom	14.22	
8	Chris Baillie	United Kingdom	14.28	

=== Semifinals ===
19 October

==== Semifinal 1 ====
Wind: -1.8 m/s

Rank	Name	Nationality	Time	Notes
1	Yuniel Hernández	Cuba	13.78	Q
2	Philip Nossmy	Sweden	13.93	Q
3	Nassim Brahimi	Qatar	14.09	Q
4	Robert Newton	United Kingdom	14.30	Q
5	Igor Peremota	Russia	14.34	
6	Daigo Nakamasu	Japan	14.35	
7	Mateus Inocêncio	Brazil	14.40	
8	Dwayne Robinson	Jamaica	14.45	

==== Semifinal 2 ====
Wind: -0.3 m/s

Rank	Name	Nationality	Time	Notes
1	Liu Xiang	China	13.75	Q
2	Ladji Doucouré	France	13.75	Q
3	Thomas Blaschek	Germany	13.81	Q
4	Chris Baillie	United Kingdom	13.86	Q
5	Ata Mubarak	Saudi Arabia	13.91	
6	Nenad Lončar	Yugoslavia	14.07	
7	Anselmo da Silva	Brazil	14.40	
	Garland Martin	United States	DNF	

=== Heats ===
18 October

==== Heat 1 ====
Wind: +0.1 m/s

Rank	Name	Nationality	Time	Notes
1	Thomas Blaschek	Germany	14.05	Q
2	Robert Newton	United Kingdom	14.22	Q
3	Ricardo Melbourne	Jamaica	14.35	
4	Mohamed Al-Thawadi	Qatar	14.42	
5	Marlián Reina	Venezuela	14.49	
6	Muhd Faiz Mohamad	Malaysia	15.05	
7	Toetu'u Sapoi'aleki	Tonga	15.22	
8	Trent Hunter	Australia	15.22	

==== Heat 2 ====
Wind: +1.8 m/s

Rank	Name	Nationality	Time	Notes
1	Yuniel Hernández	Cuba	13.86	Q
2	Chris Baillie	United Kingdom	13.95	Q
3	Mateus Inocêncio	Brazil	14.22	q
4	Igor Peremota	Russia	14.26	q
5	Gurpreet Singh	India	14.39	
6	Sebastian Siebert	Germany	14.42	
7	Ingi Thórisson	Iceland	14.84	
8	Diego Morán	Argentina	15.20	

==== Heat 3 ====
Wind: +0.6 m/s

Rank	Name	Nationality	Time	Notes
1	Dwayne Robinson	Jamaica	14.15	Q
2	Philip Nossmy	Sweden	14.20	Q
3	Nikolay Koykov	Bulgaria	14.41	
4	Andrew Cameron	Australia	14.56	
5	Kim Shin-Kyun	South Korea	14.60	
6	Michael Thomas	United States	14.68	
7	Dániel Kiss	Hungary	14.97	
	David Ilariani	Georgia	DQ	IAAF rule 162.7

==== Heat 4 ====
Wind: 0.0 m/s

Rank	Name	Nationality	Time	Notes
1	Nassim Brahimi	Qatar	14.08	Q
2	Daigo Nakamasu	Japan	14.20	Q
3	Ladji Doucouré	France	14.21	q
4	Garland Martin	United States	14.23	q
5	Anselmo da Silva	Brazil	14.28	q
6	Zayed Al-Dosari	Saudi Arabia	14.64	
7	Aléxandros Theofánof	Greece	14.71	
8	Sergi Raya	Andorra	15.41	

==== Heat 5 ====
Wind: -0.1 m/s

Rank	Name	Nationality	Time	Notes
1	Nenad Lončar	Yugoslavia	14.07	Q
2	Ata Mubarak	Saudi Arabia	14.07	Q
3	Liu Xiang	China	14.14	q
4	Juha Sonck	Finland	14.46	
5	Francisco Schilling	Chile	14.56	
6	Masakatsu Tanaka	Japan	14.63	
7	Jurica Grabušić	Croatia	14.81	
8	Timothy Flannery	Ireland	14.88	

== Participation ==
According to an unofficial count, 40 athletes from 31 countries participated in the event.

- Andorra (1)
- Argentina (1)
- Australia (2)
- Brazil (2)
- Bulgaria (1)
- Chile (1)
- China (1)
- Croatia (1)
- Cuba (1)
- Finland (1)
- France (1)
- Georgia (1)
- Germany (2)
- Greece (1)
- Hungary (1)
- Iceland (1)
- India (1)
- Ireland (1)
- Jamaica (2)
- Japan (2)
- Malaysia (1)
- Qatar (2)
- Russia (1)
- Saudi Arabia (2)
- South Korea (1)
- Sweden (1)
- Tonga (1)
- United Kingdom (2)
- United States (2)
- Venezuela (1)
- Yugoslavia (1)
