= 2003 World Championships in Athletics – Men's 110 metres hurdles =

These are the official results of the Men's 110 metres hurdles event at the 2003 IAAF World Championships in Paris, France. There were a total number of 34 participating athletes, with five qualifying heats, three semi-finals and the final held on Saturday 2003-08-30 at 18:00h.

== Medalists ==
Gold	Allen Johnson; United States (USA)
Silver	Terrence Trammell; United States (USA)
Bronze	Liu Xiang; PR China (CHN)

== Final ==
RANK	FINAL	TIME
	Allen Johnson (USA)	13.12
	Terrence Trammell (USA)	13.20
	Liu Xiang (CHN)	13.23
4.	Larry Wade (USA)	13.34
5.	Márcio de Souza (BRA)	13.48
6.	Shi Dongpeng (CHN)	13.55
7.	Yoel Hernández (CUB)	13.57
—	Chris Phillips (USA)	DQ

== Semi-final ==
- Held on Friday 2003-08-29

RANK	HEAT 1	TIME
1.	Shi Dongpeng (CHN)	13.53
2.	Larry Wade (USA)	13.55
3.	Robert Kronberg (SWE)	13.60
4.	Robert Newton (GBR)	13.62
5.	William Erese (NGR)	13.70
6.	Philip Nossmy (SWE)	13.72
7.	Redelén dos Santos (BRA)	13.77
8.	Matti Niemi (FIN)	13.86

RANK	HEAT 2	TIME
1.	Allen Johnson (USA)	13.19
2.	Liu Xiang (CHN)	13.46
3.	Yoel Hernández (CUB)	13.49
4.	Mateus Facho Inocêncio (BRA)	13.59
5.	Dudley Dorival (HAI)	13.59
6.	Masato Naito (JPN)	13.68
7.	Andrea Giaconi (ITA)	13.84
8.	Charles Allen (CAN)	14.19

RANK	HEAT 3	TIME
1.	Terrence Trammell (USA)	13.34
2.	Márcio de Souza (BRA)	13.48
3.	Shaun Bownes (RSA)	13.53
4.	Ladji Doucouré (FRA)	13.54
5.	Jerome Crews (GER)	13.67
6.	Jackson Quiñónez (ECU)	13.72
7.	Gregory Sedoc (NED)	13.74
—	Chris Phillips (USA)	DQ

== Heats ==
Held on Thursday 2003-08-28

RANK	HEAT 1	TIME
1.	Robert Kronberg (SWE)	13.46
2.	Liu Xiang (CHN)	13.48
3.	Terrence Trammell (USA)	13.51
4.	Gregory Sedoc (NED)	13.62
5.	William Erese (NGR)	13.67
6.	Andrea Giaconi (ITA)	13.69
7.	Arlindo Pinheiro (STP)	15.10

RANK	HEAT 2	TIME
1.	Allen Johnson (USA)	13.42
2.	Márcio de Souza (BRA)	13.43
3.	Shaun Bownes (RSA)	13.50
4.	Yoel Hernández (CUB)	13.56
5.	Chris Pinnock (JAM)	13.74
6.	David Ilariani (GEO)	13.89
7.	Peter Coghlan (IRL)	13.90

RANK	HEAT 3	TIME
1.	Mateus Facho Inocêncio (BRA)	13.62
2.	Robert Newton (GBR)	13.62
3.	Philip Nossmy (SWE)	13.68
4.	Jerome Crews (GER)	13.72
5.	Joseph-Berlioz Randriamihaja (MAD)	13.80
6.	Muhd Faiz Mohammad (MAS)	14.17
—	Staņislavs Olijars (LAT)	DNF

RANK	HEAT 4	TIME
1.	Larry Wade (USA)	13.49
2.	Redelén dos Santos (BRA)	13.57
3.	Masato Naito (JPN)	13.59
4.	Jackson Quiñónez (ECU)	13.67
5.	Matti Niemi (FIN)	13.69
—	Maurice Wignall (JAM)	DNS

RANK	HEAT 5	TIME
1.	Ladji Doucouré (FRA)	13.31
2.	Dudley Dorival (HAI)	13.41
3.	Shi Dongpeng (CHN)	13.48
4.	Charles Allen (CAN)	13.67
5.	Kuripitone Betham (SAM)	16.24
—	Chris Phillips (USA)	DQ
—	Jonathan Nsenga (BEL)	DNF
