= Hungary at the 2010 European Athletics Championships =

Sporting event delegation

- WA code: HUN

in Barcelona
- Competitors: 23
- Medals Ranked 23rd: Gold 0 Silver 0 Bronze 3 Total 3

European Athletics Championships appearances
- 1934; 1938; 1946; 1950; 1954; 1958; 1962; 1966; 1969; 1971; 1974; 1978; 1982; 1986; 1990; 1994; 1998; 2002; 2006; 2010; 2012; 2014; 2016; 2018; 2022; 2024

Hungary competed at the 2010 European Athletics Championships held in Barcelona, Spain, from 27 July to 1 August 2010. 23 competitors, 16 men and 7 women, took part in 14 events.

== Medallists ==
Medal	Name	Event	Date
Bronze	Dániel Kiss	Men's 110 metres hurdles	30 July
Bronze	Róbert Fazekas	Men's discus throw	1 August
Bronze	Krisztián Pars	Men's hammer throw	28 July

== Participants ==
Event	Men	Women
200 metres		Barbara Petráhn
400 metres	Máté Lukács	Barbara Petráhn
800 metres	Tamás Kazi	
1500 metres	Péter Szemeti	
5000 metres		Anikó Kálovics; Krisztina Papp
10,000 metres		Zsófia Erdélyi; Krisztina Papp
3000 metres steeplechase		Lívia Tóth
110 metres hurdles	Dániel Kiss; Balázs Baji	
20 kilometres walk	Máté Helebrand	
Shot Put	Lajos Kürthy	Anita Márton
Discus Throw	Róbert Fazekas; Zoltán Kővágó	
Hammer Throw	Kristóf Németh; Krisztián Pars	Éva Orbán
Javelin Throw	Csongor Olteán	
4x400 metres relay	Marcell Deák Nagy; Máté Lukács; Zoltán Kovács; Gábor Pásztor; László Bartha	

== Results ==
2010 Barcelona	Gold	Silver	Bronze	Total
Hungary (HUN)	0	0	3	3

Hungary entered the following athletes.

Key

- Q = Qualified for the next round
- q = Qualified for the next round as a fastest loser or, in field events, by position without achieving the qualifying target
- NR = National record
- PB = Personal best
- SB = Season best
- N/A = Round not applicable for the event

=== Men ===
Track and road events

Athlete	Event	Heat		Semifinal		Final	
Athlete	Event	Result	Rank	Result	Rank	Result	Rank
Máté Lukács	400 metres	47.74	29	Did not advance			
Tamás Kazi	800 metres	1:50.21	16	Did not advance			
Péter Szemeti	800 metres	3:52.14	26	Did not advance			
Balázs Baji	110 metres hurdles	14.01	25	Did not advance			
Dániel Kiss	110 metres hurdles	13.44	1 Q	13.47	2 Q	13.39	3rd place, bronze medalist(s)
Máté Lukács; Gábor Pásztor; Zoltán Kovács; Marcell Deák-Nagy	4 × 400 metres relay	3:08.32	13	Did not advance			
Máté Helebrandt	20 kilometres walk	—N/a				DNF	

Field events

Athlete	Event	Qualification		Final	
Athlete	Event	Distance	Position	Distance	Position
Lajos Kürthy	Shot put	19.15	14	Did not advance	
Róbert Fazekas	Discus throw	64.30	4 Q	66.43	3rd place, bronze medalist(s)
Zoltán Kővágó	Discus throw	59.04	20	Did not advance	
Krisztián Pars	Hammer throw	76.48	2 Q	79.06	3rd place, bronze medalist(s)
Kristóf Németh	Hammer throw	74.28	9 q	73.93	9
Csongor Olteán	Javelin throw	76.53	13	Did not advance	

=== Women ===
Track and road events

Athlete	Event	Heat		Semifinal		Final	
Athlete	Event	Result	Rank	Result	Rank	Result	Rank
Barbara Petráhn	200 metres	24.07	18	Did not advance			
Barbara Petráhn	400 metres	53.78	16	Did not advance			
Anikó Kálovics	5000 metres	—N/a				15:29.44 SB	6
Krisztina Papp	5000 metres	—N/a				15:52.83	10
Krisztina Papp	10,000 metres	—N/a				32:49.05	6
Zsófia Erdélyi	10,000 metres	—N/a				34:57.77	11
Lívia Tóth	3000 metres steeplechase	—N/a				10:03.97	13

Field events

Athlete	Event	Qualification		Final	
Athlete	Event	Distance	Position	Distance	Position
Anita Márton	Shot put	17.84	6 Q	17.78	9
Éva Orbán	Hammer throw	68.59	7 Q	64.99	12
