= Chepiga =

Chepiga (Russian: Чепига or Чепега) is a surname. It means "ploughstaff" in Ukrainian. Notable people with the surname include:

- Anatoliy Chepiga (born 1979), Russian GRU colonel
- Sergey Chepiga (born 1982), Russian hurdler
- Valentina Chepiga (born 1962), Ukrainian bodybuilder

== See also ==
- Chepiha
