= 2006 European Athletics Championships – Men's 110 metres hurdles =

Men's 110 metres hurdles at the European Athletics Championships

The men's 110 metres hurdles at the 2006 European Athletics Championships were held at the Ullevi on August 11 and August 12. The world champion Ladji Doucouré was knocked out in the semifinals.

== Medalists ==
Gold	Silver	Bronze
Staņislavs Olijars; Latvia	Thomas Blaschek; Germany	Andy Turner; United Kingdom

== Schedule ==
Date	Time	Round
August 11, 2006	11:25	Round 1
August 12, 2006	15:55	Semifinals
August 12, 2006	17:40	Final

== Results ==
KEY:	q	Fastest non-qualifiers	Q	Qualified	NR	National record	PB	Personal best	SB	Seasonal best

=== Round 1 ===
Qualification: First 2 in each heat (Q) and the next 6 fastest (q) advance to the semifinals.

Rank	Heat	Name	Nationality	Time	Notes
1	5	Staņislavs Olijars	Latvia	13.25	Q
2	5	Serhiy Demydyuk	Ukraine	13.47	Q, SB
3	4	Igor Peremota	Russia	13.48	Q
4	1	Robert Kronberg	Sweden	13.52	Q, SB
4	2	Andy Turner	United Kingdom	13.52	Q
6	4	Jens Werrmann	Germany	13.60	Q, PB
7	1	Ladji Doucouré	France	13.65	Q
7	3	Thomas Blaschek	Germany	13.65	Q
7	5	Alexandru Mihailescu	Romania	13.65	q
10	4	David Hughes	United Kingdom	13.66	q
11	2	Gregory Sedoc	Netherlands	13.67	Q
12	4	Ivan Bitzi	Switzerland	13.68	q, SB
12	5	Andrea Giaconi	Italy	13.68	q
12	5	Stanislav Sajdok	Czech Republic	13.68	q, PB
15	3	Cédric Lavanne	France	13.70	Q
16	1	Dániel Kiss	Hungary	13.72	q
17	3	Marcel van der Westen	Netherlands	13.73	
18	2	Felipe Vivancos	Spain	13.75	
19	2	Marko Ritola	Finland	13.82	
20	1	William Sharman	United Kingdom	13.85	
21	5	Olli Talsi	Finland	13.87	
22	3	Tarmo Jallai	Estonia	13.89	
23	3	Elmar Lichtenegger	Austria	13.89	
24	4	Iban Maiza	Spain	13.90	
25	3	Juha Sonck	Finland	13.91	
26	1	Evgeniy Borisov	Russia	13.97	
27	2	Emanuele Abate	Italy	14.04	
28	5	Joakim Blaschke	Sweden	14.06	
29	1	Theopistos Mavridis	Greece	14.09	
30	4	Damir Haracić	Bosnia and Herzegovina	14.25	
31	3	Elton Bitincka	Albania	14.32	
32	1	Miroslav Novaković	Serbia	14.40	
	4	Jonathan Nsenga	Belgium		DNF
	2	Andreas Kundert	Switzerland		DNS

=== Semifinals ===
First 4 of each Semifinal will be directly qualified (Q) for the Final.

==== Semifinal 1 ====
Rank	Lane	Name	Nationality	React	Time	Notes
1	4	Igor Peremota	Russia	0.148	13.46	Q
2	3	Serhiy Demydyuk	Ukraine	0.157	13.46	Q, SB
3	5	Robert Kronberg	Sweden	0.156	13.56	Q
4	6	Jens Werrmann	Germany	0.137	13.60	Q, PB
5	7	Cédric Lavanne	France	0.170	13.63	
6	1	Stanislav Sajdok	Czech Republic	0.153	13.71	
7	2	Alexandru Mihailescu	Romania	0.154	13.78	
8	8	David Hughes	United Kingdom	0.133	13.87	

==== Semifinal 2 ====
Rank	Lane	Name	Nationality	React	Time	Notes
1	3	Staņislavs Olijars	Latvia	0.154	13.25	Q
2	5	Thomas Blaschek	Germany	0.142	13.27	Q
3	6	Andy Turner	United Kingdom	0.151	13.36	Q
4	8	Dániel Kiss	Hungary	0.168	13.68	Q
5	4	Ladji Doucouré	France	0.179	13.87	
	2	Ivan Bitzi	Switzerland	0.157		DNF
	7	Andrea Giaconi	Italy	0.150		DSQ
	1	Gregory Sedoc	Netherlands	0.143		DSQ

=== Final ===
Rank	Lane	Name	Nationality	React	Time	Notes
1st place, gold medalist(s)	6	Staņislavs Olijars	Latvia	0.151	13.24	
2nd place, silver medalist(s)	3	Thomas Blaschek	Germany	0.150	13.46	
3rd place, bronze medalist(s)	2	Andy Turner	United Kingdom	0.148	13.52	
4	4	Igor Peremota	Russia	0.155	13.55	
5	7	Robert Kronberg	Sweden	0.164	13.57	
6	1	Jens Werrmann	Germany	0.148	13.73	
7	8	Dániel Kiss	Hungary	0.178	13.77	
8	5	Serhiy Demydyuk	Ukraine	0.244	13.96	
