= William Sharman =

British hurdler (born 1984)

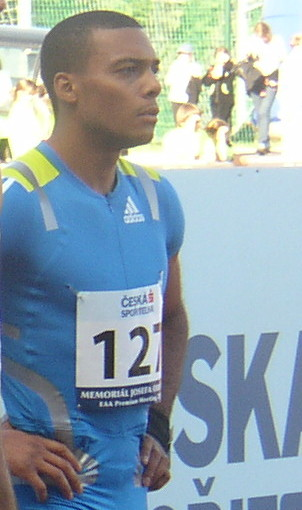
- Sharman at the 2010 Josef Odložil Memorial in Prague

Personal information
- Nationality: British
- Born: 12 September 1984 (age 41) Lagos, Nigeria

Sport
- Sport: Athletics
- Event: 110 metres hurdles
- Club: Corby AC

Achievements and titles
- Personal best: 110 m hurdles 13.16 s (European Championships)
Medal record
Representing Great Britain
European Championships
Silver medal – second place	2014 Zurich	110 m hurdles
Representing England
Commonwealth Games
Silver medal – second place	2010 Delhi	110 m hurdles
Silver medal – second place	2014 Glasgow	110 m hurdles

William "Will" Sharman (born 12 September 1984) is a British/Nigerian former athlete who specialised in the 110 metres hurdles. He started his career as a junior high jumper and decathlete, but focused entirely on hurdling after a shoulder injury. He made his international debut for Great Britain at the 2006 European Athletics Championships and went on to compete at the 2007 Summer Universiade. Sharman came to prominence in 2009, after he significantly improved upon his previous personal best and finished fourth in the 110 metres hurdles final at the 2009 World Championships. This would be the first of three consecutive appearances in the World Championship final, he's since finished fifth in both the 2011 and 2013 finals.

Initially coached by John Anderson, he was a timekeeper for the UK television series Gladiators. He is also a classically trained pianist and holds two university degrees.

== Career ==
=== Junior career ===
Sharman was born in Lagos, Nigeria on 12 September 1984 but his family moved shortly after to the United Kingdom and he grew up in Corby, Northamptonshire.

His first experiences of track and field competition were as a junior high jumper and John Anderson, the referee for the UK television series Gladiators and coach of former world record holder Dave Moorcroft, urged him to focus on athletics. Training at Corby Athletics Club, he began competing in the decathlon and 110 metres hurdles and he became the No. 1 ranked under-20 British athlete in both disciplines. At the Amateur Athletic Association (AAA) under-20s championships in 2003, he won the decathlon. His first major junior competition was the 2003 European Athletics Junior Championships, where he finished fifth in the 110 m hurdles final. He competed at the 2004 AAA meeting and finished third in the hurdles, behind Robert Newton and Paul Gray. At the 2005 European Athletics U23 Championships, Sharman was just outside the medals with a fourth-place finish. A shoulder injury that year had impaired his javelin throwing ability and he made the decision to abandon the decathlon to focus solely on hurdling.

=== Senior breakthrough ===
Sharman performed well on the British athletics circuit in 2006, winning three of the hurdles races building up to the 2006 European Athletics Championships, and also winning at the AAA under-23 competition with a personal best of 13.49 seconds. As a result, he was selected for the Great Britain team for the event, his first major championships. However, he did not progress beyond the heats of the 110 m hurdles and finished fourth, beaten to the qualification spot by Dániel Kiss.

The following year represented a breakthrough into the senior circuit, as he was invited to the Birmingham Indoor Games and other high-profile meetings. Sharman moved to Loughborough University and began to train with Polish hurdles coach George Maciukiewicz. He finished third at the UK Championships, both indoors (60 metres hurdles) and outdoors, beaten by Andy Turner and Allan Scott both times. He competed at the Bislett Games in 2007 where he ran his season's best of 13.68 seconds, making him the second fastest British athlete that year after Turner. He attended the 2007 Summer Universiade but only reached the semi-finals of the competition.

In 2008, Sharman again finished behind Turner and Scott at the national Olympic trials, but he was optimistic about making the qualification standard of 13.55 seconds for the 2008 Beijing Olympics. Ultimately, however, his best of the season was a wind-aided 13.59 s thus he was not included in the British Olympic squad.

=== First World Championships and Commonwealth Games ===
At the British trials for the 2009 World Championships in Athletics he finished fourth with a disappointing 14.08 seconds, making selection seem unlikely. However, he was a last-minute call up for the British team: he was not included in the original line-up but he set a new personal best of 13.44 seconds in Loughborough in July, making the "A" qualification standard for the event.

He was the fifth fastest qualifier in the heats of the 110 m hurdles, but he made more of an impact in the semi-finals: the favourite in the race, world record holder Dayron Robles, pulled up injured and Sharman emphatically won with a personal best of 13.38, celebrating as he crossed the finish line. In the final race he finished in fourth position with another best of 13.30 seconds, becoming the second surprise performer of the final after winner Ryan Brathwaite. The fourth-place finish made him the fastest European in the final, equalling Turner's European season's best, and placed him at number five on the all-time British list. His performance at the event was singled out as one of the highlights of the British team: he made the biggest improvement by a British athlete in terms of ranking, having been ranked 103rd in the world at the start of the year.

Following the World Championships, Sharman stated that a gold medal at the 2012 London Olympics would be one of his aims for the future. He performed well on the athletics circuit, finishing just a hundredth behind David Payne at the British Grand Prix and taking a close fourth place at Memorial Van Damme.

A wrist injury ruled Sharman out of competition at the start of 2010, but he returned in time for the national championships and defeated Andrew Turner to lift his first outdoor title. Their fortunes were reversed at the 2010 European Athletics Championships as Sharman was disqualified in the semi-finals while Turner won the competition. The pair duelled again at the Commonwealth Games in New Delhi. A stomach bug affected him during the event but he managed to complete and English podium sweep alongside Turner and Lawrence Clarke, taking home the silver medal – his first at a major international competition.

== Personal life ==
In addition to being a world-class international hurdler, Sharman has a diverse range of other talents: he plays the cornet, is a classically trained pianist, has a university degree in economics from Leicester University and a master's in banking and finance from Loughborough University. He was also a timekeeper for the Gladiators television series.

His brother, Richard Sharman, is also an international sportsman and he competed at the 2007 Bobsleigh World Championships. His father David Sharman was also involved in sport, previously playing rugby union for Northampton Saints, in addition to being a professional pianist. Though his sister Sarah Sharman followed in the sporting tracks, she went down the artistic route to become a dancer/actor. Sharman is a family man with three children. In his free time, Sharman likes to engage in martial arts.

He appeared in the BBC Horizon documentary "The Truth About Exercise" in 2011.

== Personal bests ==
Event	Best	Location	Date
60 metres hurdles	7.53 s	Sopot, Poland	9 March 2014
110 metres hurdles	13.16 s	Zurich, Switzerland	14 August 2014

Other bests
Event	Best	Location	Date
60 metres	6.89 s	Lee Valley Park, United Kingdom	28 January 2007
100 metres	10.86 s	Woerden, Netherlands	27 August 2005
200 metres	21.59 s	Geneva, Switzerland	11 June 2006
400 metres	48.53 s	Woerden, Netherlands	27 August 2005
High jump	2.08 m	Woerden, Netherlands	27 August 2005
Pole vault	4.00 m	London, United Kingdom	30 July 2005
Long jump	7.08 m	Calais, France	6 August 2005
Heptathlon	5278 pts	Sheffield, United Kingdom	16 January 2005
Decathlon	7384 pts	Woerden, Netherlands	27 August 2005

- All information taken from IAAF and Power of 10 profiles.
