= Athletics at the 2005 Summer Universiade – Men's 110 metres hurdles =

The men's 110 metres hurdles event at the 2005 Summer Universiade was held on 15–16 August in İzmir, Turkey.

== Medalists ==
Gold	Silver	Bronze
Matheus Facho Inocêncio; Brazil	Jared MacLeod; Canada	Serhiy Demydyuk; Ukraine

== Results ==
=== Heats ===
Wind:
Heat 1: -1.4 m/s, Heat 2: -0.6 m/s, Heat 3: +0.8 m/s, Heat 4: -1.3 m/s

Rank	Heat	Athlete	Nationality	Time	Notes
1	2	Matheus Facho Inocêncio	Brazil	13.69	Q
2	3	Jared MacLeod	Canada	13.70	Q
3	2	Dániel Kiss	Hungary	13.77	Q
4	2	Rouhollah Askari	Iran	13.82	Q
5	3	Florian Seibold	Germany	13.84	Q
6	4	Allan Scott	Great Britain	13.85	Q
7	1	Andreas Kundert	Switzerland	13.92	Q
8	4	Gergely Palágyi	Hungary	13.93	Q
9	3	Serhiy Demydyuk	Ukraine	13.94	Q
10	2	David Hughes	Great Britain	13.98	q
10	4	Hennie Kotze	South Africa	13.98	Q
10	4	Yakov Petrov	Russia	13.98	Q
13	2	Evgeniy Borisov	Russia	14.00	q
13	3	Thiago Castelo Branco	Brazil	14.00	q
15	2	Juha Sonck	Finland	14.01	q
16	1	Jan Schindzielorz	Germany	14.03	Q
17	1	Tarmo Jallai	Estonia	14.10	Q
18	3	Nenad Lončar	Serbia and Montenegro	14.13	
19	1	Maksim Lynsha	Belarus	14.23	
19	4	Damir Haračić	Bosnia and Herzegovina	14.23	
21	4	Stanislav Sajdok	Czech Republic	14.25	
22	2	Luís Sá	Portugal	14.29	
23	1	Séléké Samake	Senegal	14.32	
24	3	René Oruman	Estonia	14.36	
25	2	Nazar Mukhamedzan	Kazakhstan	14.75	
26	4	Demirhan Çemberci	Turkey	15.10	
27	3	Rihards Ošiņš	Latvia	15.12	
28	3	Stanislav Kostadinov	Bulgaria	15.70	
	1	Sanjeewa Herath	Sri Lanka	DNF	
	1	David Ilariani	Georgia	DNS	
	1	Alexandru Mihailescu	Romania	DNS	

=== Semifinals ===
Wind:
Heat 1: 0.0 m/s, Heat 2: +2.0 m/s

Rank	Heat	Athlete	Nationality	Time	Notes
1	2	Jared MacLeod	Canada	13.54	Q, PB
2	2	Florian Seibold	Germany	13.63	Q
3	2	Serhiy Demydyuk	Ukraine	13.65	Q
4	2	Allan Scott	Great Britain	13.69	Q
5	2	Evgeniy Borisov	Russia	13.73	SB
6	1	Matheus Facho Inocêncio	Brazil	13.75	Q
7	1	Rouhollah Askari	Iran	13.81	Q, SB
8	1	Andreas Kundert	Switzerland	13.84	Q, SB
9	1	Jan Schindzielorz	Germany	13.85	Q
10	1	Dániel Kiss	Hungary	13.87	
11	2	David Hughes	Great Britain	13.88	
12	1	Gergely Palágyi	Hungary	13.89	
13	1	Juha Sonck	Finland	13.90	
14	2	Hennie Kotze	South Africa	13.99	
15	1	Yakov Petrov	Russia	14.29	
16	1	Tarmo Jallai	Estonia	14.40	
	2	Thiago Castelo Branco	Brazil	DNF	

=== Final ===
Wind: -0.4 m/s

Rank	Athlete	Nationality	Time	Notes
1st place, gold medalist(s)	Matheus Facho Inocêncio	Brazil	13.45	
2nd place, silver medalist(s)	Jared MacLeod	Canada	13.67	
3rd place, bronze medalist(s)	Serhiy Demydyuk	Ukraine	13.69	
4	Florian Seibold	Germany	13.82	
5	Allan Scott	Great Britain	13.89	
6	Jan Schindzielorz	Germany	13.91	
7	Rouhollah Askari	Iran	13.93	
8	Andreas Kundert	Switzerland	13.97	
