= Hungary at the 2014 European Athletics Championships =

- WA code: HUN

in Zürich
- Competitors: 27
- Medals: Gold 1 Silver 0 Bronze 1 Total 2

European Athletics Championships appearances
- 1934; 1938; 1946; 1950; 1954; 1958; 1962; 1966; 1969; 1971; 1974; 1978; 1982; 1986; 1990; 1994; 1998; 2002; 2006; 2010; 2012; 2014; 2016; 2018; 2022; 2024

Hungary competed at the 2014 European Athletics Championships in Zürich, Switzerland, between 12 and 17 August 2014. A delegation of 27 athletes were sent to represent the country.

== Medals ==
Medal	Name	Event	Date
Gold	Krisztián Pars	Men's hammer throw	16 August
Bronze	Anita Márton	Women's shot put	17 August

== Results ==
Men

Track & road events

Athlete	Event	Heat		Semifinal		Final	
Athlete	Event	Result	Rank	Result	Rank	Result	Rank
Bálint Móricz	400 m	47.04	35	did not advance			
Tamás Kazi	800 m	1:48.05	10 q	1:48.04	11	did not advance	
Balázs Baji	110 m hurdles	13.37 SB	5 Q	13.31 NR	4 Q	13.29 NR	4
Dániel Kiss	110 m hurdles	13.64 SB	20	did not advance			
Máté Koroknai	400 m hurdles	50.33 PB	17 Q	50.95	22	did not advance	
Tibor Koroknai	400 m hurdles	50.84	25	did not advance			
Albert Minczér	3000 metres steeplechase	9:32.13	27	did not advance			
Máté Helebrandt	20 kilometres walk	—N/a				1:27:54	25
Sándor Rácz	20 kilometres walk	—N/a				DNF	

Field Events

Athlete	Event	Qualification		Final	
Athlete	Event	Distance	Rank	Distance	Rank
Zoltán Kővágó	Discus throw	61.14	14	did not advance	
Róbert Szikszai	Discus throw	NM		did not advance	
Krisztián Pars	Hammer throw	74.44 q	9	82.69 WL	1st place, gold medalist(s)
Kristóf Németh	Hammer throw	73.33	14	did not advance	
Ákos Hudi	Hammer throw	72.53	16	did not advance	

Combined events – Decathlon

Athlete	Event	100 m	LJ	SP	HJ	400 m	110H	DT	PV	JT	1500 m	Final	Rank
Attila Zsivoczky	Result	11.52	6.65	15.56 SB	2.04	51.06	15.26 =SB	44.82 SB	4.40	57.40	4:33.04 SB	7646	17
Attila Zsivoczky	Points	748	732	824	840	766	818	763	731	699	725	7646	17

Women

Track & road events

Athlete	Event	Heat		Semifinal		Final	
Athlete	Event	Result	Rank	Result	Rank	Result	Rank
Éva Kaptur	200 m	24.07 =PB	29	did not advance			
Krisztina Papp	10,000 metres	—N/a				32:32.62	9
Zsófia Erdélyi	10,000 metres	—N/a				33:41.72	21
Viktória Madarász	20 kilometres walk	—N/a				1:30:57 PB	12

Field Events

Athlete	Event	Qualification		Final	
Athlete	Event	Distance	Rank	Distance	Rank
Fanni Schmelcz	Long jump	5.90	26	did not advance	
Barbara Szabó	High jump	1.85	17	did not advance	
Anita Márton	Shot put	17.36	6 q	19.04 NR	3rd place, bronze medalist(s)
Éva Orbán	Hammer throw	70.48	7 Q	NM	
Fruzsina Fertig	Hammer throw	65.46	13	did not advance	
Réka Gyurátz	Hammer throw	62.14	20	did not advance	

Combined events – Heptathlon

Athlete	Event	100H	HJ	SP	200 m	LJ	JT	800 m	Final	Rank
Xénia Krizsán	Result	13.59	1.79	14.17	25.37	6.01 SB	43.58	2:14.07	6156	9
Xénia Krizsán	Points	1037	966	805	853	853	736	906	6156	9
Györgyi Zsivoczky-Farkas	Result	14.06 SB	1.82 SB	13.60	25.87	5.94	50.73 PB	2:14.68 SB	6151 SB	10
Györgyi Zsivoczky-Farkas	Points	970	1003	767	809	831	874	897	6151 SB	10
