= Hungary at the 2012 European Athletics Championships =

- WA code: HUN

in Helsinki
- Competitors: 21
- Medals: Gold 1 Silver 1 Bronze 1 Total 3

European Athletics Championships appearances
- 1934; 1938; 1946; 1950; 1954; 1958; 1962; 1966; 1969; 1971; 1974; 1978; 1982; 1986; 1990; 1994; 1998; 2002; 2006; 2010; 2012; 2014; 2016; 2018; 2022; 2024

Hungary competed at the 2012 European Athletics Championships held in Helsinki, Finland, between 27 June to 1 July 2012. 21 competitors, 14 men and 7 women, took part in 13 events.

== Medals ==
Medal	Name	Event	Date
Gold	Krisztián Pars	Men's hammer throw	30 June
Silver	Marcell Deák Nagy	Men's 400 metres	29 June
Bronze	Zoltán Kővágó	Men's discus throw	30 June

== Participants ==
Event	Men	Women
200 m		Éva Kaptur
400 m	Marcell Deák Nagy	
800 m	Péter Szemeti	
10,000 m		Krisztina Papp
110 m hurdles	Balázs Baji	
110 m hurdles	Dániel Kiss	
400 m hurdles	Márk Koroknai	
4 × 400 m relay	Dávid Bartha; Tibor Kása; Zoltán Kovács; Máté Lukács	
High jump	Olivér Harsányi	
Shot put	Lajos Kürthy	Anita Márton
Discus throw	Zoltán Kővágó	
Hammer throw	Kristóf Németh	Éva Orbán
Hammer throw	Krisztián Pars	Éva Orbán
Javelin throw		Vanda Juhász
Javelin throw		Xénia Nagy
Heptathlon		Györgyi Farkas

== Results ==
=== Men ===
==== Track ====
Event	Athletes	Heats		Semifinal		Final	
Event	Athletes	Result	Rank	Result	Rank	Result	Rank
400 m	Marcell Deák Nagy	46.18	8 Q	45.68	2 Q	45.52	Silver medal
800 m	Péter Szemeti	1:49.13	30	DNQ			
110 m hurdles	Balázs Baji	13.50	4 Q	13.68	17	DNQ	
110 m hurdles	Dániel Kiss	13.62	10 Q	13.59	14	DNQ	
400 m hurdles	Márk Koroknai	53.22	37	DNQ			
4 × 400 m relay	Dávid Bartha; Tibor Kása; Zoltán Kovács; Máté Lukács	3.11.79	14	—		DNQ	

==== Field ====
Event	Athletes	Qualification		Final	
Event	Athletes	Result	Rank	Result	Rank
High jump	Olivér Harsányi	2.10	30	DNQ	
Shot put	Lajos Kürthy	19.48	12 q	19.55	9
Discus throw	Zoltán Kővágó	65.99	2 q	66.42	Bronze medal
Hammer throw	Kristóf Németh	72.46	16	DNQ	
Hammer throw	Krisztián Pars	78.09	1 Q	79.72	Gold medal

=== Women ===
==== Track ====
Event	Athletes	Heats		Semifinal		Final	
Event	Athletes	Result	Rank	Result	Rank	Result	Rank
200 m	Éva Kaptur	23.97	24 q	24.44	22	DNQ	
10,000 m	Krisztina Papp	—				DNF	

==== Field ====
Event	Athletes	Qualification		Final	
Event	Athletes	Result	Rank	Result	Rank
Shot put	Anita Márton	17.30	7 q	17.93	7
Javelin throw	Vanda Juhász	53.65	17	DNQ	
Javelin throw	Xénia Nagy	51.63	22	DNQ	
Hammer throw	Éva Orbán	67.89	8 q	67.92	7

==== Combined ====
Heptathlon	Event	Györgyi Farkas		
Heptathlon	Event	Results	Points	Rank
	100 m hurdles	14.23	946	16
	High jump	1.80	978	6
	Shot Put	12.62	702	14
	200 m	25.74	820	17
	Long jump	5.92	825	14
	Javelin throw	45.81	779	8
	800 m	2:19.93	824	13
Final			5874	14

== Sources ==
- "Participants" (pdf) (in Hungarian). masz.hu.
- "Atlétikai Eb: Minczér Albert nem indulhat Helsinkiben" (in Hungarian). nemzetisport.hu.
- "European Athletics - Event Website". sportresult.com. Archived from the original on 6 July 2012.
