= Athletics at the 2003 Summer Universiade – Men's 110 metres hurdles =

The men's 110 metres hurdles event at the 2003 Summer Universiade was held in Daegu, South Korea on 25 and 26 August.

== Medalists ==
Gold	Silver	Bronze
Anselmo da Silva; Brazil	Igor Peremota; Russia	Park Tae-kyong; South Korea

== Results ==
=== Heats ===
Wind:
Heat 1: +0.2 m/s, Heat 2: -0.8 m/s, Heat 3: -0.2 m/s, Heat 4: -0.1 m/s

Rank	Heat	Athlete	Nationality	Time	Notes
1	2	Anselmo da Silva	Brazil	13.69	Q
2	2	Nenad Lončar	Serbia and Montenegro	13.93	Q
3	4	Luís Sá	Portugal	13.99	Q
4	1	Miroslav Novaković	Serbia and Montenegro	14.01	Q
4	2	Philippe Lamine	France	14.01	Q
6	3	Igor Peremota	Russia	14.02	Q
7	3	Frikkie van Zyl	South Africa	14.04	Q
8	3	Alleyne Lett	Grenada	14.04	Q
9	1	Jan Schindzielorz	Germany	14.06	Q
9	4	Florian Seibold	Germany	14.06	Q
11	1	Mohamed Rabbani Hassan	Malaysia	14.07	Q
12	2	Park Tae-kyong	South Korea	14.10	q
13	1	Rui Palma	Portugal	14.18	q
14	1	Hamdi Mhirsi	Tunisia	14.22	q
15	3	Amadou Diouf	Senegal	14.25	q
16	4	Félou Doudou Sow	Senegal	14.25	Q
17	2	Suphan Wongsriphuck	Thailand	14.33	
18	1	Luis López	Mexico	14.44	
19	4	Jang Sung-han	South Korea	14.57	
20	2	Janis Kovals	Latvia	14.90	
21	3	Edi Jakariya	Indonesia	14.91	
22	1	Nguyễn Thanh Tùng	Vietnam	15.76	
23	3	Ranjithkumar Silvapragasam	Sri Lanka	15.97	
	4	Narongdech Janjai	Thailand	DNF	

=== Semifinals ===
Wind:
Heat 1: +1.1 m/s, Heat 2: +0.9 m/s

Rank	Heat	Athlete	Nationality	Time	Notes
1	1	Anselmo da Silva	Brazil	13.74	Q
2	1	Park Tae-kyong	South Korea	13.76	Q
3	2	Igor Peremota	Russia	13.81	Q
4	2	Luís Sá	Portugal	13.86	Q
5	1	Florian Seibold	Germany	13.87	Q
6	1	Philippe Lamine	France	13.97	Q
7	1	Alleyne Lett	Grenada	13.99	
8	2	Nenad Lončar	Serbia and Montenegro	14.02	Q
9	2	Jan Schindzielorz	Germany	14.03	Q
10	2	Frikkie van Zyl	South Africa	14.04	
11	1	Miroslav Novaković	Serbia and Montenegro	14.05	
12	1	Rui Palma	Portugal	14.07	
13	2	Félou Doudou Sow	Senegal	14.08	
14	2	Mohamed Rabbani Hassan	Malaysia	14.09	
15	2	Hamdi Mhirsi	Tunisia	14.35	
16	1	Amadou Diouf	Senegal	14.52	

=== Final ===
Wind: -1.6 m/s

Rank	Athlete	Nationality	Time	Notes
1st place, gold medalist(s)	Anselmo da Silva	Brazil	13.68	
2nd place, silver medalist(s)	Igor Peremota	Russia	13.75	
3rd place, bronze medalist(s)	Park Tae-kyong	South Korea	13.78	
4	Philippe Lamine	France	14.01	
5	Nenad Lončar	Serbia and Montenegro	14.02	
6	Jan Schindzielorz	Germany	14.04	
7	Luís Sá	Portugal	14.08	
8	Florian Seibold	Germany	14.39	
