= Jens Werrmann =

German hurdler (born 1985)

Jens Werrmann (born 29 May 1985 in Bad Kreuznach) is a German hurdler.

He finished 6th in the 110m hurdles final at the 2006 European Athletics Championships in Gothenburg.

== Competition record ==
Year	Competition	Venue	Position	Event	Notes
Representing Germany
2004	World Junior Championships	Grosseto, Italy	8th	110 m hurdles	14.29 (wind: -0.6 m/s)
2005	European U23 Championships	Erfurt, Germany	13th (sf)	110 m hurdles	14.05 (wind: -0.6 m/s)
2006	European Championships	Gothenburg, Sweden	6th	110 m hurdles	13.73
2007	European U23 Championships	Debrecen, Hungary	4th	110 m hurdles	13.79 (wind: -0.4 m/s)
