= Jared MacLeod =

Canadian hurdler

Personal information
- Born: 3 April 1980 (age 46) Winnipeg, Canada

Sport
- Sport: Track and field
Medal record
Representing Canada
Summer Universiade
Silver medal – second place	2005 İzmir	110m hurdles

Jared MacLeod (born 3 April 1980) is a Canadian athlete specializing in the high hurdles. He won the silver at the 2005 Summer Universiade.

His outdoor 110 meters hurdles personal best is 13.54 from 2005. His indoor 60 meters personal best is 7.70 (2006).

He currently sits on the Athletics Canada Board of Directors as an Athlete Representative.

== Competition record ==
Year	Competition	Venue	Position	Event	Notes
Representing Canada
2001	Jeux de la Francophonie	Ottawa, Canada	9th (h)	110 m hurdles	14.15
2001	Universiade	Beijing, China	19th (h)	110 m hurdles	14.13
2002	NACAC U-25 Championships	San Antonio, United States	3rd	110m hurdles	13.80 (wind: +1.3 m/s)
2002	NACAC U-25 Championships	San Antonio, United States	4th	4 × 100 m relay	40.03
2005	Universiade	İzmir, Turkey	2nd	110 m hurdles	13.67
2005	Jeux de la Francophonie	Niamey, Niger	2nd	110 m hurdles	13.70
2006	World Indoor Championships	Moscow, Russia	28th (h)	60 m hurdles	7.89
2006	Commonwealth Games	Melbourne, Australia	8th	110 m hurdles	13.80
2007	Pan American Games	Rio de Janeiro, Brazil	7th (h)	110 m hurdles	13.78
2007	World Championships	Osaka, Japan	19th (sf)	110 m hurdles	13.66
2009	Jeux de la Francophonie	Beirut, Lebanon	1st	110 m hurdles	13.56
