= Alexander John (athlete) =

German hurdler (born 1986)

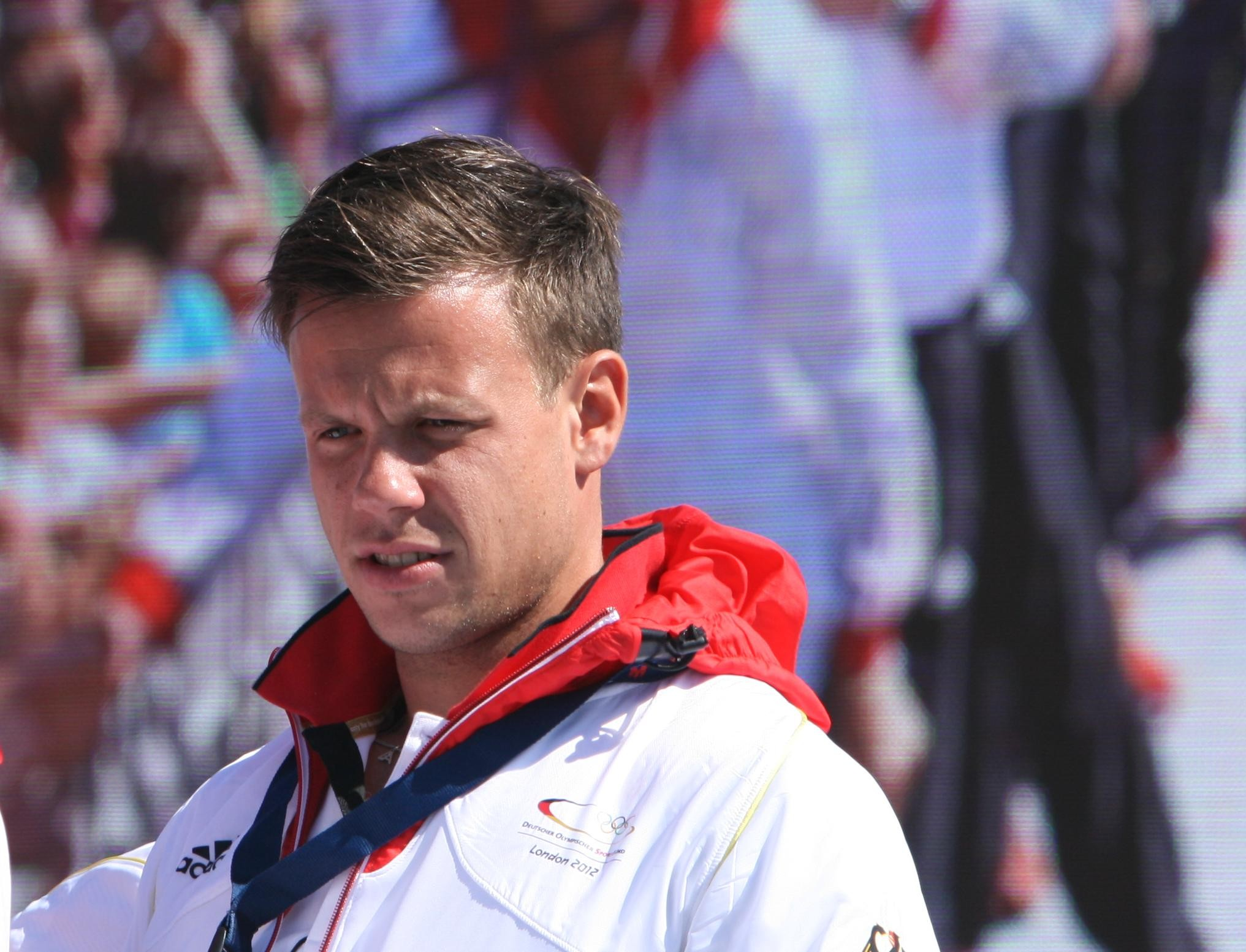
- Alexander John in 2012

Personal information
- Born: 3 May 1986 (age 40) Zeulenroda, East Germany

Alexander John (born 3 May 1986 in Zeulenroda, East Germany) is a German track and field athlete who specialises in the 110 metres hurdles.

== International competitions ==
Year	Competition	Venue	Position	Event	Notes
Representing Germany
2003	World Youth Championships	Sherbrooke, Canada	3rd	110 m hurdles (91.4 cm)	13.50
2004	World Junior Championships	Grosseto, Italy	8th (sf)	110 m hurdles	14.10 (-0.3 m/s)
2005	European Junior Championships	Kaunas, Lithuania	3rd	110 m hurdles	14.10
2007	European U23 Championships	Debrecen, Hungary	14th (h)	110 m hurdles	15.84 (-2.6 m/s)
2009	World Championships	Berlin, Germany	22nd (sf)	110 m hurdles	13.64
2010	European Championships	Barcelona, Spain	8th	110 m hurdles	13.71
2012	European Championships	Helsinki, Finland	4th	110 m hurdles	13.38 (PB)
2015	World Championships	Beijing, China	—	110 m hurdles	DSQ
2016	European Championships	Amsterdam, Netherlands	16th (sf)	110 m hurdles	13.60
2016	Olympic Games	Rio de Janeiro, Brazil	34th (h)	110 m hurdles	14.13
2018	European Championships	Berlin, Germany	10th (h)	110 m hurdles	13.69^{1}

^{1}Disqualified in the semifinals
