= Hungary at the 2018 European Athletics Championships =

- WA code: HUN
- National federation: MASZ

in Berlin
- Competitors: 35
- Medals: Gold 0 Silver 0 Bronze 1 Total 1

European Athletics Championships appearances
- 1934; 1938; 1946; 1950; 1954; 1958; 1962; 1966; 1969; 1971; 1974; 1978; 1982; 1986; 1990; 1994; 1998; 2002; 2006; 2010; 2012; 2014; 2016; 2018; 2022; 2024

Hungary competed at the 2018 European Athletics Championships in Berlin, Germany, from 6–12 August 2018. A delegation of 35 athletes were sent to represent the country.

The following athletes were selected to compete by the Hungarian Athletics Association.

== Medals ==
Medal	Name	Event	Date
Bronze	Bence Halász	Men's Hammer throw	7 August

== Results ==
Men
Track and road

Athletes	Event	Heats		Semifinal		Final	
Athletes	Event	Result	Rank	Result	Rank	Result	Rank
Dániel Szabó	100 metres	10.64	36	Did not advance			
Tamás Kazi	800 metres	1:48.37	23	Did not advance			
Tamás Kazi	1500 metres	3:42.98	18	—N/a		Did not advance	
Benjamin Kovács	1500 metres	3:54.29	31	—N/a		Did not advance	
Gáspár Csere	Marathon	—N/a				2:19:21	29
Balázs Baji	110 metres hurdles	Bye		13.41	6 Q	13.55	8
Bálint Szeles	110 metres hurdles	14.07	15	Did not advance			
Máté Koroknai	400 metres hurdles	50.70	9 q	49.77	14	Did not advance	
Tibor Koroknai	400 metres hurdles	50.34	3 Q	49.24	10	Did not advance	
Máté Helebrandt	50 km walk	—N/a				DNF	
Bence Venyercsán	50 km walk	—N/a				3:58.25	12

Field events

Athletes	Event	Qualification		Final	
Athletes	Event	Distance	Position	Distance	Position
Zoltán Kővágó	Discus throw	59.29	20	Did not advance	
Róbert Szikszai	Discus throw	61.82	15	Did not advance	
Norbert Rivasz-Tóth	Javelin throw	69.94	27	Did not advance	
Bence Halász	Hammer throw	76.81	2 Q	77.36	3rd place, bronze medalist(s)
Bence Pásztor	Hammer throw	69.66	26	Did not advance	

Women
Track and road

Athletes	Event	Heats		Semifinal		Final	
Athletes	Event	Result	Rank	Result	Rank	Result	Rank
Anasztázia Nguyen	100 metres	11.72	22	Did not advance			
Evelin Nádházy	400 metres	54.34	32	Did not advance			
Bianka Kéri	800 metres	2:03.44	22	Did not advance			
Krisztina Papp	10,000 metres	—N/a				33:20.27	13
Fanni Gyurkó	Marathon	—N/a				2:47:20	40
Gréta Kerekes	100 metres hurdles	13.23	12 Q	13.23	20	Did not advance	
Luca Kozák	100 metres hurdles	Bye		12.96	12	Did not advance	
Klaudia Sorok	100 metres hurdles	13.93	19	Did not advance			
Viktória Gyürkés	3000 metres steeplechase	9:38.56	15 q	—N/a		9:40.41	13
Zita Kácser	3000 metres steeplechase	9:53.36	28	—N/a		Did not advance	
Éva Kaptur; Gréta Kerekes; Luca Kozák; Anasztázia Nguyen; Fanni Schmelcz; Klaudia Sorok	4 × 100 metres relay	44.15	13	—N/a		Did not advance	
Barbara Kovács	20 km walk	—N/a				1:39:35	24
Rita Récsei	20 km walk	—N/a				1:42:55	25
Anett Torma	50 km walk	—N/a				DQ	

Field events

Athletes	Event	Qualification		Final	
Athletes	Event	Distance	Position	Distance	Position
Réka Gyurátz	Hammer throw	69.45	8 q	70.48	9
Éva Orbán	Hammer throw	59.16	28	Did not advance	

Combined events – Heptathlon

Athlete	Event	100H	HJ	SP	200 m	LJ	JT	800 m	Final	Rank
Xénia Krizsán	Result	13.64	1.79	13.99	25.05	6.24	45.45	2:07.61	6367	7
Xénia Krizsán	Points	1030	966	793	882	924	772	1000	6367	7
Györgyi Zsivoczky-Farkas	Result	13.91	1.76	13.96	25.56	5.77	45.09	DNS	DNF	
Györgyi Zsivoczky-Farkas	Points	991	928	791	836	780	765	DNS	DNF	

== See also ==
- Hungary at the 2018 European Championships
