= Luís Sá =

Portuguese hurdler

Luís Manuel Teixeira Sá (born 17 March 1981) is a Portuguese athlete specialising in the 110 metres hurdles. He represented his country at the 2004 Summer Olympics failing to qualify for the second round.

He has personal bests of 13.62 for the 110 metres hurdles (2004) and 7.79 for the 60 metres hurdles (2003). Nowadays he is a special member of Resistente's club

== Competition record ==
Year	Competition	Venue	Position	Event	Notes
Representing Portugal
2002	European Championships	Munich, Germany	30th (h)	110 m hurdles	14.16
2003	Universiade	Daegu, South Korea	7th	110 m hurdles	14.08
2004	Ibero-American Championships	Huelva, Spain	7th	110 m hurdles	14.22
2004	Olympic Games	Athens, Greece	45th (h)	110 m hurdles	14.01
2005	Universiade	İzmir, Turkey	22nd (h)	110 m hurdles	14.29
2006	Lusophony Games	Macau, China	3rd	110 m hurdles	14.59
2007	Universiade	Bangkok, Thailand	24th (h)	110 m hurdles	14.45
2009	Lusophony Games	Lisbon, Portugal	2nd	110 m hurdles	14.22
2010	Ibero-American Championships	San Fernando, Spain	11th (h)	110 m hurdles	14.58
