= Mateus Facho Inocêncio =

Brazilian hurdler (born 1981)

Personal information
- Born: 17 May 1981 (age 45) Patrocínio Paulista, Brazil

Sport
- Sport: Track and field
Medal record
Representing Brazil
Summer Universiade
Gold medal – first place	2005 Izmir	110m hurdles
South American Championships
Silver medal – second place	2013 Cartagena	110 m hurdles

Matheus Facho Inocêncio (first name also written Mateus; born 17 May 1981) is a Brazilian athlete who specializes in the 110 metres hurdles.

His personal best time is 13.33 seconds, achieved during the Olympic Games in Athens.

He also participated in the bobsleigh competition at the 2002 Winter Olympics, where he was part of the Brazilian bobsleigh 4-crew that ranked 27th out of 29 finishing and 33 competing teams.

== Competition record ==
Year	Competition	Venue	Position	Event	Notes
Representing Brazil
2000	South American Junior Championships	São Leopoldo, Brazil	1st	110 m hurdles	14.53
2000	World Junior Championships	Santiago, Chile	13th (sf)	110 m hurdles	14.40 (wind: -1.8 m/s)
2002	Ibero-American Championships	Guatemala City, Guatemala	2nd	110 m hurdles	13.58
2003	South American Championships	Barquisimeto, Venezuela	3rd	110 m hurdles	13.69
2003	World Championships	Paris, France	10th (sf)	110 m hurdles	13.59
2004	Ibero-American Championships	Huelva, Spain	2nd	110 m hurdles	13.52
2004	Olympic Games	Athens, Greece	7th	110 m hurdles	13.49
2004	World Athletics Final	Monte Carlo, Monaco	7th	110 m hurdles	13.65
2005	South American Championships	Cali, Colombia	3rd	110 m hurdles	13.72 (w)
2005	World Championships	Helsinki, Finland	8th	110 m hurdles	13.48
2005	Universiade	İzmir, Turkey	1st	110 m hurdles	13.45
2006	World Indoor Championships	Moscow, Russia	10th (sf)	60 m hurdles	7.67
2006	South American Championships	Tunja, Colombia	3rd	110 m hurdles	13.84
2010	Ibero-American Championships	San Fernando, Spain	6th	110 m hurdles	13.95
2011	South American Championships	Buenos Aires, Argentina	1st	110 m hurdles	13.70
2011	Pan American Games	Guadalajara, Mexico	8th	110 m hurdles	13.76
2011	Pan American Games	Guadalajara, Mexico	3rd (h)	110 m hurdles	39.44
2013	South American Championships	Cartagena, Colombia	2nd	110 m hurdles	13.67
2014	South American Games	Santiago, Chile	5th	110 m hurdles	13.93
