= 2007 European Athletics U23 Championships – Men's 110 metres hurdles =

The men's 110 metres hurdles event at the 2007 European Athletics U23 Championships was held in Debrecen, Hungary, at Gyulai István Atlétikai Stadion on 13 and 14 July.

== Medalists ==
Gold	Konstadinos Douvalidis; Greece
Silver	Adrien Deghelt; Belgium
Bronze	Emanuele Abate; Italy

== Results ==
=== Final ===
14 July
Wind: -0.4 m/s

Rank	Name	Nationality	Time	Notes
1st place, gold medalist(s)	Konstadinos Douvalidis	Greece	13.49	
2nd place, silver medalist(s)	Adrien Deghelt	Belgium	13.59	
3rd place, bronze medalist(s)	Emanuele Abate	Italy	13.66	
4	Jens Werrmann	Germany	13.79	
5	Maksim Lynsha	Belarus	13.82	
6	Stévy Telliam	France	14.05	
7	Otto Kilpi	Finland	14.33	
	Bano Traoré	France	DNF	

=== Heats ===
13 July
First 3 in each heat and 2 best to the Final

==== Heat 1 ====
Wind: -2.6 m/s

Rank	Name	Nationality	Time	Notes
1	Jens Werrmann	Germany	13.76	Q
2	Adrien Deghelt	Belgium	13.81	Q
3	Stévy Telliam	France	14.16	Q
4	Dimitri Bascou	France	14.20	
5	Matúš Janeček	Slovakia	14.35	
6	João Ferreira	Portugal	15.02	
7	Alexander John	Germany	15.84	
	Christian de la Calle	Spain	DNS	

==== Heat 2 ====
Wind: 0.3 m/s

Rank	Name	Nationality	Time	Notes
1	Konstadinos Douvalidis	Greece	13.67	Q
2	Bano Traoré	France	13.78	Q
3	Emanuele Abate	Italy	13.88	Q
4	Maksim Lynsha	Belarus	14.00	q
5	Otto Kilpi	Finland	14.07	q
6	Paul Dittmer	Germany	14.14	
7	Levente Käfer	Hungary	14.95	
	Aurel Baciu	Romania	DQ	IAAF Rule 142.4

== Participation ==
According to an unofficial count, 15 athletes from 11 countries participated in the event.

- Belarus (1)
- Belgium (1)
- Finland (1)
- France (3)
- Germany (3)
- Greece (1)
- Hungary (1)
- Italy (1)
- Portugal (1)
- Romania (1)
- Slovakia (1)
