= 2004 World Junior Championships in Athletics – Men's 110 metres hurdles =

The men's 110 metres hurdles event at the 2004 World Junior Championships in Athletics was held in Grosseto, Italy, at Stadio Olimpico Carlo Zecchini on 16, 17 and 18 July. 106.7 cm (3'6) (senior implement) hurdles were used.

== Medalists ==
Gold	Aries Merritt; United States
Silver	Dayron Robles; Cuba
Bronze	Kevin Craddock; United States

== Results ==
=== Final ===
18 July
Wind: -0.6 m/s

Rank	Name	Nationality	Time	Notes
1st place, gold medalist(s)	Aries Merritt	United States	13.56	
2nd place, silver medalist(s)	Dayron Robles	Cuba	13.77	
3rd place, bronze medalist(s)	Kevin Craddock	United States	13.77	
4	Liu Lilu	China	13.96	
5	Rodrigo Pereira	Brazil	14.10	
6	Éder de Souza	Brazil	14.13	
7	Garfield Darien	France	14.20	
8	Jens Werrmann	Germany	14.29	

=== Semifinals ===
17 July

==== Semifinal 1 ====
Wind: -0.3 m/s

Rank	Name	Nationality	Time	Notes
1	Aries Merritt	United States	13.65	Q
2	Kevin Craddock	United States	13.74	Q
3	Éder de Souza	Brazil	13.98	Q
4	Garfield Darien	France	14.03	Q
5	Alexander John	Germany	14.10	
6	Maksim Lynsha	Belarus	14.12	
7	Patrick Lee	Jamaica	14.41	
	Nikólaos Filandarákis	Greece	DQ	IAAF rule 162.7

==== Semifinal 2 ====
Wind: -0.5 m/s

Rank	Name	Nationality	Time	Notes
1	Liu Lilu	China	13.94	Q
2	Dayron Robles	Cuba	13.98	Q
3	Rodrigo Pereira	Brazil	14.03	Q
4	Jens Werrmann	Germany	14.18	Q
5	Ruan de Vries	South Africa	14.37	
6	Tomoki Nakamura	Japan	14.39	
7	Aymen Ben Ahmed	Tunisia	14.57	
	Bano Traoré	France	DNF	

=== Heats ===
16 July

==== Heat 1 ====
Wind: -0.1 m/s

Rank	Name	Nationality	Time	Notes
1	Rodrigo Pereira	Brazil	14.07	Q
2	Bano Traoré	France	14.11	Q
3	Patrick Lee	Jamaica	14.18	q
4	Jens Werrmann	Germany	14.22	q
5	Denis Byvakin	Russia	14.46	
6	Yevgeniy Minenko	Israel	14.73	
7	Shinar Shazua Sharuddin	Malaysia	14.99	
8	Lu Chunsheng	China	15.05	

==== Heat 2 ====
Wind: +1.2 m/s

Rank	Name	Nationality	Time	Notes
1	Liu Lilu	China	13.88	Q
2	Éder de Souza	Brazil	14.07	Q
3	Alexander John	Germany	14.10	q
4	Tomoki Nakamura	Japan	14.13	q
5	Seleke Samake	Senegal	14.29	
6	Elton Bitincka	Albania	14.31	
7	Christian De La Calle	Spain	14.51	
8	Aurel Baciu	Romania	14.54	

==== Heat 3 ====
Wind: +1.8 m/s

Rank	Name	Nationality	Time	Notes
1	Dayron Robles	Cuba	13.82	Q
2	Maksim Lynsha	Belarus	13.99	Q
3	Aymen Ben Ahmed	Tunisia	14.17	q
4	Garfield Darien	France	14.18	q
5	Pavel Filev	Russia	14.31	
6	Jesse King	Barbados	14.67	
7	Stefano Petrolli	Italy	14.73	

==== Heat 4 ====
Wind: +1.8 m/s

Rank	Name	Nationality	Time	Notes
1	Aries Merritt	United States	13.83	Q
2	Ruan de Vries	South Africa	14.13	Q
3	John Burstow	Australia	14.27	
4	Mubarak Al-Mabadi	Saudi Arabia	14.41	
5	Kuo Hung-yi	Chinese Taipei	14.47	
6	Marín Norhiher	Mexico	14.68	
7	Emanuele Abate	Italy	14.84	

==== Heat 5 ====
Wind: +1.3 m/s

Rank	Name	Nationality	Time	Notes
1	Kevin Craddock	United States	13.82	Q
2	Nikólaos Filandarákis	Greece	14.35	Q
3	Leon Fourie	South Africa	14.49	
4	Carlos Jorge	Dominican Republic	14.50	
5	Christophe Du Mée	Mauritius	14.51	
6	Badar Al-Bouainain	Saudi Arabia	14.52	
7	Gregorios Georgiou	Cyprus	14.70	

== Participation ==
According to an unofficial count, 37 athletes from 28 countries participated in the event.

- Albania (1)
- Australia (1)
- Barbados (1)
- Belarus (1)
- Brazil (2)
- China (2)
- Chinese Taipei (1)
- Cuba (1)
- Cyprus (1)
- Dominican Republic (1)
- France (2)
- Germany (2)
- Greece (1)
- Israel (1)
- Italy (2)
- Jamaica (1)
- Japan (1)
- Malaysia (1)
- Mauritius (1)
- Mexico (1)
- Romania (1)
- Russia (2)
- Saudi Arabia (2)
- Senegal (1)
- South Africa (2)
- Spain (1)
- Tunisia (1)
- United States (2)
