= Hungary at the 2016 European Athletics Championships =

- WA code: HUN
- National federation: MASZ

in Amsterdam
- Competitors: 32 (14 men and 18 women) in 20 events
- Medals Ranked 23rd: Gold 0 Silver 2 Bronze 0 Total 2

European Athletics Championships appearances
- 1934; 1938; 1946; 1950; 1954; 1958; 1962; 1966; 1969; 1971; 1974; 1978; 1982; 1986; 1990; 1994; 1998; 2002; 2006; 2010; 2012; 2014; 2016; 2018; 2022; 2024

Hungary competed at the 2016 European Athletics Championships in Amsterdam, Netherlands, between 6 and 10 July 2016.

== Medals ==
Medal	Name	Event	Date
Silver	Anita Márton	Women's shot put	7 July
Silver	Balázs Baji	Men's 110 metres hurdles	9 July

== Results ==
Men

Track & road events

Athlete	Event	Heat		Semifinal		Final	
Athlete	Event	Result	Rank	Result	Rank	Result	Rank
János Sipos	100 m	10.45	15 q	10.47	22	did not advance	
Gábor Pásztor	200 m	21.60	22	did not advance			
Tamás Kazi	1500 m	3:44.64	26	—		did not advance	
Benjamin Kovács	1500 m	3:45.16	27	—		did not advance	
Balázs Baji	110 m hurdles	Bye		13.29 NR	3 Q	13.28 NR	2nd place, silver medalist(s)
Valdó Szűcs	110 m hurdles	13.76	=11 Q	13.76	19	did not advance	
Tibor Koroknai	400 m hurdles	51.32	16	did not advance			
Gábor Józsa	Half marathon	—				1:08:57	69

Field Events

Athlete	Event	Qualification		Final	
Athlete	Event	Distance	Rank	Distance	Rank
János Huszák	Discus throw	60.58	23	did not advance	
Zoltán Kővágó	Discus throw	65.21	3 Q	64.66	6
Róbert Szikszai	Discus throw	58.01	26	did not advance	
Norbert Rivasz-Tóth	Javelin throw	74.56	27	did not advance	
Ákos Hudi	Hammer throw	70.37	21	did not advance	
Bence Pásztor	Hammer throw	71.20	17	did not advance	

Women

Track & road events

Athlete	Event	Heat		Semifinal		Final	
Athlete	Event	Result	Rank	Result	Rank	Result	Rank
Anasztázia Nguyen	100 m	11.66 SB	17	did not advance			
Bianka Kéri	800 m	2:04.90	22 Q	2:03.47	23	did not advance	
Lilla Juhász	100 m hurdles	13.51	=23	did not advance			
Gréta Kerekes	100 m hurdles	13.54	25	did not advance			
Luca Kozák	100 m hurdles	13.30	16	did not advance			
Viktória Gyürkés	3000 m steeplechase	9:59.08	22	—		did not advance	
Zita Kácser	3000 m steeplechase	10:19.74	26	—		did not advance	
Éva Kaptur; Gréta Kerekes; Anasztázia Nguyen; Fanni Schmelcz	4 x 100 m relay	44.34 =NR	13	—		did not advance	
Zsófia Erdélyi	Half marathon	—				1:21:32	79
Krisztina Papp	Half marathon	—				1:13:23	24

Field Events

Athlete	Event	Qualification		Final	
Athlete	Event	Distance	Rank	Distance	Rank
Barbara Szabó	High jump	1.89 =SB	5 q	1.89 =SB	11
Anita Márton	Shot put	17.54	4 Q	18.72	2nd place, silver medalist(s)
Réka Szilágyi	Javelin throw	55.19	21	did not advance	
Fruzsina Fertig	Hammer throw	NM		did not advance	
Éva Orbán	Hammer throw	65.86	18	did not advance	

Combined events – Heptathlon

Athlete	Event	100H	HJ	SP	200 m	LJ	JT	800 m	Final	Rank
Xénia Krizsán	Result	13.53	1.74	13.91 SB	25.05 SB	6.13	47.38	2:11.18	6266	4
Xénia Krizsán	Points	1046	903	789	882	890	809	947	6266	4
Györgyi Zsivoczky-Farkas	Result	13.89 SB	1.80	14.02 SB	25.73	6.06 SB	46.03	2:14.14	6144	5
Györgyi Zsivoczky-Farkas	Points	994	978	795	821	868	783	905	6144	5
