= Athletics at the 2006 Commonwealth Games – Men's 110 metres hurdles =

Men's 110 metres hurdles at the Commonwealth Games

The men's 110 metres hurdles event at the 2006 Commonwealth Games was held on March 21.

== Medalists ==
Gold	Silver	Bronze
Maurice Wignall; Jamaica	Chris Baillie; Scotland	Andy Turner; England

== Results ==
=== Heats ===
Qualification: First 2 of each heat (Q) and the next 2 fastest (q) qualified for the final.

Wind:
Heat 1: +0.7 m/s, Heat 2: +1.4 m/s, Heat 3: ?

Rank	Heat	Name	Nationality	Time	Notes
1	2	Maurice Wignall	Jamaica	13.34	Q
2	1	Chris Baillie	Scotland	13.44	Q, PB
3	1	Shaun Bownes	South Africa	13.52	Q, SB
4	2	David Hughes	England	13.58	Q, PB
5	3	Andy Turner	England	13.62	Q
6	1	Chris Pinnock	Jamaica	13.65	q
7	3	Charles Allen	Canada	13.66	Q
8	1	Jared MacLeod	Canada	13.70	q
9	1	Damien Greaves	England	13.71	
10	3	Selim Nurudeen	Nigeria	13.84	
11	2	Allan Scott	Scotland	13.86	
12	2	Mohd Hassan	Malaysia	13.88	PB
13	3	Gregory Eyears	Australia	14.00	
14	3	Ruan de Vries	South Africa	14.14	
15	2	Kyle Vander Kuyp	Australia	14.22	
16	3	Ronald Forbes	Cayman Islands	14.35	
17	1	Muhammad Sajjad Ahmad	Pakistan	14.36	
18	3	Muhammad Shah	Pakistan	14.64	
19	2	Alberto Mondre	Mauritius	14.75	
20	2	Bangali Keita	Sierra Leone	14.92	

=== Final ===
Wind: –1.1 m/s

Rank	Lane	Name	Nationality	Time	Notes
1st place, gold medalist(s)	4	Maurice Wignall	Jamaica	13.26	
2nd place, silver medalist(s)	6	Chris Baillie	Scotland	13.61	
3rd place, bronze medalist(s)	5	Andy Turner	England	13.62	SB
4	7	Charles Allen	Canada	13.66	
5	8	Chris Pinnock	Jamaica	13.67	
6	3	Shaun Bownes	South Africa	13.70	
7	1	David Hughes	England	13.70	
8	2	Jared MacLeod	Canada	13.80	
