= Chepiha =

Chepiha (Ukrainian: Чепіга) is a surname. It means "ploughstaff" in Ukrainian. Notable people with the surname include:

- Valentyna Chepiha (born 1962), Ukrainian bodybuilder
- Zakhary Chepiha (1725–1797), Cossack leader

== See also ==
- Chepiga
