= Hungary at the 1978 European Athletics Championships =

- WA code: HUN

in Prague
- Competitors: 25
- Medals: Gold 1 Silver 0 Bronze 0 Total 1

European Athletics Championships appearances
- 1934; 1938; 1946; 1950; 1954; 1958; 1962; 1966; 1969; 1971; 1974; 1978; 1982; 1986; 1990; 1994; 1998; 2002; 2006; 2010; 2012; 2014; 2016; 2018; 2022; 2024; 2026

Hungary sent 25 athletes to the 1978 European Athletics Championships which took place 29 August–3 September 1978 in Prague. Hungary won one medal at the Championships.

== Medalists ==
| Medal | Name | Event |
|---|---|---|
| 1st place, gold medalist(s) | Margit Papp | Women's pentathlon |
