= Nenad Lončar =

Serbian hurdler

Olympic medal record

Representing Yugoslavia

Men's athletics

Mediterranean Games
Bronze medal – third place	2001 Tunis	110m Hurdles

Nenad Lončar (born 6 March 1981 in Belgrade) is a Serbian former hurdler. He competed at the 2004 Summer Olympics in Athens, Greece.

== Competition record ==
Year	Competition	Venue	Position	Event	Notes
Representing Serbia and Montenegro
1999	European Junior Championships	Riga, Latvia	13th (h)	110 m hurdles	14.49
2000	World Junior Championships	Santiago, Chile	8th (sf)	110 m hurdles	14.07 (-0.3 m/s)
2001	European U23 Championships	Amsterdam, Netherlands	5th	110 m hurdles	13.94 (+0.4 m/s)
2001	Mediterranean Games	Radès, Tunisia	3rd	110 m hurdles	13.90
2002	European Championships	Munich, Germany	31st (h)	110 m hurdles	14.19
2003	European U23 Championships	Bydgoszcz, Poland	8th	110 m hurdles	13.80 (+0.6 m/s)
2003	Universiade	Daegu, South Korea	5th	110 m hurdles	14.02
2004	Olympic Games	Athens, Greece	46th (h)	110 m hurdles	14.02
2005	Mediterranean Games	Almería, Spain	7th	110 m hurdles	14.02
2005	Universiade	İzmir, Turkey	18th (h)	110 m hurdles	14.13
Representing Serbia
2009	Universiade	Belgrade, Serbia	16th (sf)	110 m hurdles	14.50
