= Philip Nossmy =

Swedish hurdler

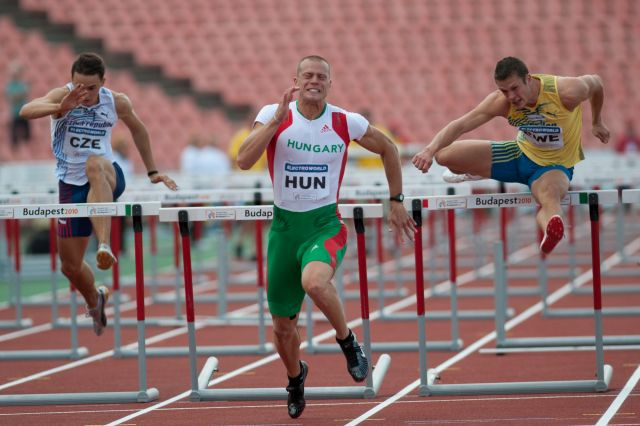
Philip Nossmy (right) at the 2010 European Team Championships

Philip Nossmy (December 6, 1982) is a Swedish male athlete who competes in the 110 metres hurdles. Nossmy became European champion for 19-year-old juniors in 2001 on the distance.

== Competition record ==
Year	Competition	Venue	Position	Event	Notes
Representing Sweden
2000	World Junior Championships	Santiago, Chile	5th	110 m hurdles	13.92 (wind: -0.1 m/s)
2001	European Junior Championships	Grosseto, Italy	1st	110 m hurdles	13.81
2003	European U23 Championships	Bydgoszcz, Poland	2nd	110m hurdles	13.50 (wind: 0.6 m/s)
2003	European U23 Championships	Bydgoszcz, Poland	4th	4x100 m relay	39.64
2003	World Championships	Paris, France	17th (sf)	110 m hurdles	13.72
2005	European Indoor Championships	Madrid, Spain	4th	60 m hurdles	7.65
2010	World Indoor Championships	Doha, Qatar	10th (sf)	60 m hurdles	7.69
2010	European Championships	Barcelona, Spain	11th (sf)	110 m hurdles	13.87
2012	European Championships	Helsinki, Finland	7th	110 m hurdles	13.59
2013	European Indoor Championships	Gothenburg, Sweden	14th (sf)	60 m hurdles	7.78
2013	World Championships	Moscow, Russia	23rd (h)	110 m hurdles	13.66
2014	World Indoor Championships	Sopot, Poland	24th (h)	60 m hurdles	7.92
