= Chris Phillips (hurdler) =

American hurdler (born 1972)

Medal record

Men's Athletics

Representing United States

Pan American Junior Athletics Championships
Gold medal – first place	1991 Kingston	110 m hurdles

Christopher Phillips (born July 24, 1972, in Crossett, Arkansas) is a retired American athlete who specialized in the 110 metres hurdles.

At the 2003 World Championships, Phillips achieved a lifetime best of 13.26 seconds in the first round. He eventually reached the final, but was disqualified for modafinil doping. A month later, he finished fifth at the World Athletics Final.

Phillips competed collegiately for the track powerhouse University of Arkansas.

== Anti-doping rule violation ==
In 2003 Philips received a public warning for an anti-doping rule violation after he'd tested positive for Modafinil.
