= Hungary at the 2024 European Athletics Championships =

- Flag of Hungary
- WA code: HUN

in Rome, Italy 7 June 2024 – 12 June 2022
- Competitors: 62 (25 men and 37 women)
- Medals Ranked 23rd: Gold 0 Silver 1 Bronze 0 Total 1

European Athletics Championships appearances
- 1934; 1938; 1946; 1950; 1954; 1958; 1962; 1966; 1969; 1971; 1974; 1978; 1982; 1986; 1990; 1994; 1998; 2002; 2006; 2010; 2012; 2014; 2016; 2018; 2022; 2024

Hungary competed at the 2024 European Athletics Championships in Rome, Italy from 7–12 June 2024.

== Medallist ==
Medal	Name	Event	Date
Silver	Bence Halász	Men's hammer throw	9 June

== Results ==
Hungary entered the following athletes.

Key

- Q = Qualified for the next round
- q = Qualified for the next round as a fastest loser or, in field events, by position without achieving the qualifying target
- NR = National record
- PB = Personal best
- SB = Season best
- N/A = Round not applicable for the event

=== Men ===
Track and road events

Athlete	Event	Heat		Semifinal		Final	
Athlete	Event	Result	Rank	Result	Rank	Result	Rank
Zoltán Wahl	200 metres	21.05 SB	18	Did not advance			
Attila Molnár	400 metres	Bye		45.04 SB	6 q	45.07	6
Zoltán Wahl	400 metres	DNF		Did not advance			
Dániel Huller	800 metres	1:49.59	32	Did not advance			
Balázs Vindics	800 metres	1:46.84 SB	26	Did not advance			
Levente Szemerei	Half marathon	—N/a				1:05:57 SB	45
Dániel Eszes	110 metres hurdles	14.09	21	Did not advance			
Bálint Szeles	110 metres hurdles	13.81	13 q	13.83	20	Did not advance	
Árpád Bánóczy	400 metres hurdles	49.95	11 q	50.14	22	Did not advance	
István Palkovits	3000 metres steeplechase	8:47.32	15	—N/a		Did not advance	
Máté Helebrandt	20 kilometres walk	—N/a				1:23:22	16
Norbert Tóth	20 kilometres walk	—N/a				1:30:02	27
Bence Venyercsán	20 kilometres walk	—N/a				1:24:08	20
Ernõ Steigerwald; Patrik Simon Enyingi; Zoltán Wahl; Attila Molnar	4 × 400 metres relay	3:02.09 NR	8 Q	—N/a		3:02.10	8

Field events

Athlete	Event	Qualification		Final	
Athlete	Event	Distance	Position	Distance	Position
Péter Bakosi	High jump	2.07	25	Did not advance	
Dániel Jankovics	High jump	2.17	20	Did not advance	
Róbert Szikszai	Discus throw	58.58	28	Did not advance	
György Herczeg	Javelin throw	65.00	27	Did not advance	
Norbert Rivasz-Tóth	Javelin throw	71.32	24	Did not advance	
Bence Halász	Hammer throw	77.84 SB	2 Q	80.49 SB	2nd place, silver medalist(s)
Dániel Rába	Hammer throw	72.52	23	Did not advance	
Donát Varga	Hammer throw	70.78	29	Did not advance	

Combined events – Decathlon

Athlete	Event	100 m	LJ	SP	HJ	400 m	110H	DT	PV	JT	1500 m	Final	Rank
Zsombor Gálpál	Result	10.91 SB	6.87	13.86	1.84	48.31 PB	15.08	40.64	4.10	61.93 PB	4:43.45	7528	19
Zsombor Gálpál	Points	881	783	720	661	894	840	678	645	767	659	7528	19

=== Women ===
Track and road events

Athlete	Event	Heat		Semifinal		Final	
Athlete	Event	Result	Rank	Result	Rank	Result	Rank
Boglárka Takács	100 metres	Bye		11.16	9	Did not advance	
Alexa Sulyán	200 metres	23.30	10 q	23.42	22	Did not advance	
Boglárka Takács	200 metres	Bye		23.09	13	Did not advance	
Bianka Kéri	800 metres	2:03.37	26	Did not advance			
Lili Anna Vindics-Tóth	5000 metres	—N/a				DNF	
Viktória Wagner-Gyürkés	5000 metres	—N/a				15:17.45 SB	12
Lilla Böhm	10,000 metres	—N/a				32:41.41 PB	15
Nóra Szabó	Half marathon	—N/a				1:13:27 =SB	43
Gréta Kerekes	100 metres hurdles	13.02	5 q	13.05	18	Did not advance	
Luca Kozák	100 metres hurdles	Bye		13.01 SB	16	Did not advance	
Anna Tóth	100 metres hurdles	Bye		DNF		Did not advance	
Sára Mátó	400 metres hurdles	55.95	8 q	55.35 PB	16	Did not advance	
Janka Molnár	400 metres hurdles	DNS		Did not advance			
Zita Urbán	3000 metres steeplechase	10:14.39	15	—N/a		Did not advance	
Viktória Madarász	20 kilometres walk	—N/a				1:37:43	26
Rita Récsei	20 kilometres walk	—N/a				1:32:54	14
Tiziana Spiller	20 kilometres walk	—N/a				1:43:55	30
Jusztina Csóti; Anna Luca Kocsis; Gréta Kerekes; Alexa Sulyán	4 × 100 metres relay	43.70	11	—N/a		Did not advance	
Sarolta Kriszt; Sára Mátó; Bianka Kéri; Virág Simon	4 × 400 metres relay	3:31.28 SB	15	—N/a		Did not advance	

Field events

Athlete	Event	Qualification		Final	
Athlete	Event	Distance	Position	Distance	Position
Fédra Fekete	High jump	1.85	15	Did not advance	
Hanga Klekner	Pole vault	4.25	22	Did not advance	
Petra Bánhidi-Farkas	Long jump	6.46	20	Did not advance	
Diana Lesti	Long jump	DNS			
Anasztázia Nguyen	Long jump	6.32	25	Did not advance	
Renáta Beregszászi	Shot put	15.06	24	Did not advance	
Violetta Veiland	Shot put	15.72	21	Did not advance	
Dóra Kerekes	Discus throw	52.92	26	Did not advance	
Annabella Bogdán	Javelin throw	52.91	23	Did not advance	
Angéla Diósi-Moravcsik	Javelin throw	54.53 SB	19	Did not advance	
Réka Gyurátz	Hammer throw	69.06 SB	9 q	66.68	12

Combined events – Heptathlon

Athlete	Event	100H	HJ	SP	200 m	LJ	JT	800 m	Final	Rank
Xénia Krizsán	Result	13.62 SB	1.74 SB	14.03 SB	25.23 SB	6.31 SB	44.98 SB	2:13.74 SB	6218 SB	8
Xénia Krizsán	Points	1033	941	796	866	946	763	911	6218 SB	8
Rita Nemes	Result	13.71	1.77	13.86	25.38 SB	6.31 PB	42.56	2:13.50	6174	9
Rita Nemes	Points	1020	941	785	852	946	716	914	6174	9
Szabina Szűcs	Result	14.04	1.74	12.60	24.97 SB	6.23	39.26	2:12.80	5965	16
Szabina Szűcs	Points	973	903	701	890	921	653	924	5965	16
