= Andy Turner (hurdler) =

English athletics competitor

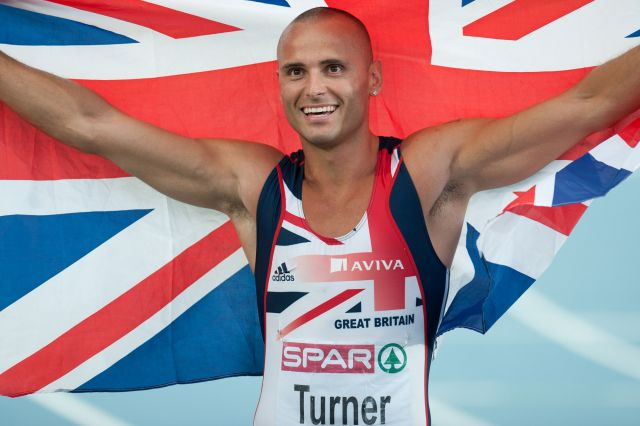
- Turner in Barcelona 2010

Personal information
- Nationality: British (English)
- Born: 19 September 1980 (age 45) Nottingham, England
- Height: 183 cm (6 ft 0 in)
- Weight: 78 kg (12 st 4 lb; 172 lb)

Sport
- Sport: Athletics
- Event: 110 metres hurdles
- Club: Sale Harriers

Achievements and titles
- Personal best: 100m:=10.32s 110m hurdles=13.22 s
Medal record
Men's athletics
Representing Great Britain
World Championships
Bronze medal – third place	2011 Daegu	110 m hurdles
European Championships
Gold medal – first place	2010 Barcelona	110 m hurdles
Bronze medal – third place	2006 Gothenburg	110 m hurdles
European Team Championships
Gold medal – first place	2009 Leiria	110 m hurdles
Gold medal – first place	2011 Stockholm	110 m hurdles
Continental Cup
Silver medal – second place	2010 Split	110 m hurdles
Representing England
Commonwealth Games
Gold medal – first place	2010 Delhi	110 m hurdles
Bronze medal – third place	2006 Melbourne	110 m hurdles

Andrew Steven Turner (born 19 September 1980) is a retired track and field athlete from England who specialised in the 110 metres hurdles and occasionally competed in the 100 and 200 metres sprints as well as long jump. At the 110 m hurdles, he is the 2011 World Championship bronze medallist, the 2010 European Champion and the 2010 Commonwealth Champion. Also in 2010, he broke the automatically timed world record in the 200 metres hurdles. He was coached by Lloyd Cowan.

== Biography ==
Turner was born in Hucknall, Nottingham, England and educated at Nottingham High School.

Andy Turner competed at the 2004 Athens Olympics, but failed to progress beyond the heats. Turner was third over the 110 m hurdles at the 2006 Commonwealth Games in Melbourne, in a time of 13.62 seconds. He won the bronze medal in the 110 m hurdles at the 2006 European Athletics Championships, and finished fourth at the 2007 European Indoor Athletics Championships. He narrowly failed to make it into the final of the 110 m hurdles at the 2007 IAAF World Championships in Athletics with his time in the third semi-final 0.05 seconds outside the second fastest losers' spot.

Andy Turner represented Great Britain for a second time at the 2008 Summer Olympics and reached the quarter-finals stage. Following this performance, UK Athletics reviewed athletes funding and Turner's basic lottery grant of around £12,000 was cut, based on the assumption that he would not be a medal hopeful for the following year's World Championships.

At the beginning of the 2009 athletics season, he finished fourth in the 60 metres hurdles in the European Athletics Indoor Championships, narrowly missing out on a medal. After competing in the 150 metres street race at the Great CityGames in Manchester, Turner won the 110 m hurdles at the Fanny Blankers-Koen Games in 13.30 seconds, close to a personal best. He won the 110 m hurdles at the 2009 European Team Championships, and said he intended to prove to UK Athletics, that he could compete at the highest level in the sport. He entered the 2009 World Championships in Athletics, but was eliminated in the heats stage while carrying an injury. He went on to finish the season at the 2009 IAAF World Athletics Final, where he was fifth.

The following year he competed at the 2010 European Team Championships in Bergen, winning the 110 m hurdles competition in 13.48 seconds to help Great Britain to second place overall in the tournament. Turner went on to his most significant victory to date in the 110 m hurdles at the 2010 European Athletics Championships in Barcelona later that year. In the final, Turner got off to a quick start, but trailed Petr Svoboda in the final with thirty metres remaining, but when Svoboda collided badly with the eighth hurdle, Turner powered through and won in a time of 13.28.

Turner completed a successful 2010 season by winning the Commonwealth Games 110 m hurdles title in New Delhi in 13.38.

At the 2011 Manchester City Games, Turner ran the rarely run 200 meters hurdles on a straight in 22.10 (+2.0). That time was superior to the previous automatically timed best by Laurent Ottoz. Ottoz had run his race in 22.55 around the bend on a conventional track, Turner ran on a specially constructed straight track on the streets of Manchester. Turner's time still did not exceed the last officially ratified record in the event, a hand timed 21.9 by Don Styron that had already stood for more than half a century. The IAAF currently recognises all three times as records in "non-IAAF World Record events," Ottoz around a bend, Styron hand timed on a straight and Turner automatically timed on a straight.

He then went on to win a bronze medal at the 2011 World Championships in Athletics after Dayron Robles was disqualified for putting Liu Xiang of China off balance. A year later on English soil at the 2012 Olympics, Turner was one of the hurdlers to help Liu off the track after his injury and dramatic exit.

Turner's defence of his Commonwealth title at the 2014 Commonwealth Games in Glasgow was halted when he crashed out of his first round heat. At the 2014 European Athletics Championships Turner announced that he would retire from athletics at the end of the year.

After retiring from athletics, Turner initially took up a career as a personal trainer, before deciding to follow in the footsteps of his brother, Garry, a fitness model, by becoming a bodybuilder.

== Personal bests ==
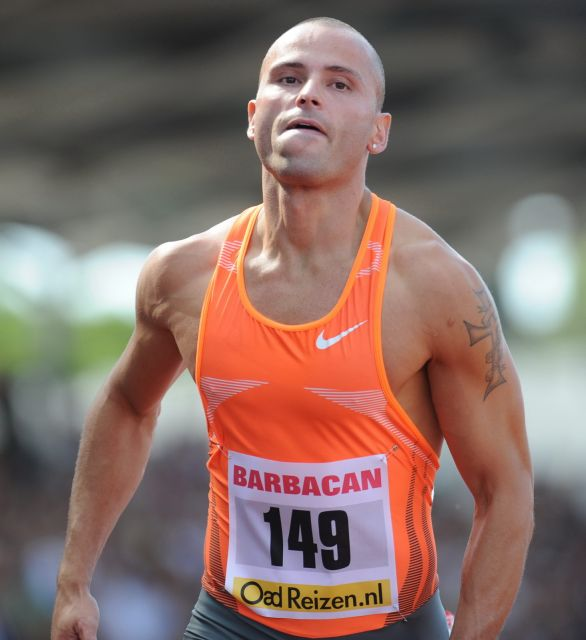
Turner competing in Hengelo

Event	Best	Location	Date
60 metres	6.79 s	Piraeus, Greece	25 February 2009
100 metres	10.32s	Manchester, England	17 May 2009
200 metres (indoor)	20.91 s	Sheffield, England	12 February 2011
50 metres hurdles	6.65 s	Stockholm, Sweden	21 February 2008
60 metres hurdles	7.55 s	Sheffield, England	11 February 2007
110 metres hurdles	13.22 s	Lausanne, Switzerland	30 June 2011
200 metres hurdles	22.10 s	Manchester, England	15 May 2011

- All information taken from IAAF profile and UKA profile.

== Television appearance ==
Turner appeared as the "This Is My..." guest in a 2013 episode of the British game show Would I Lie to You?, where he revealed that he was beaten in a speed-eating competition by track and field athlete Greg Rutherford.
