= Alexandru Mihailescu =

Romanian hurdler (born 1982)

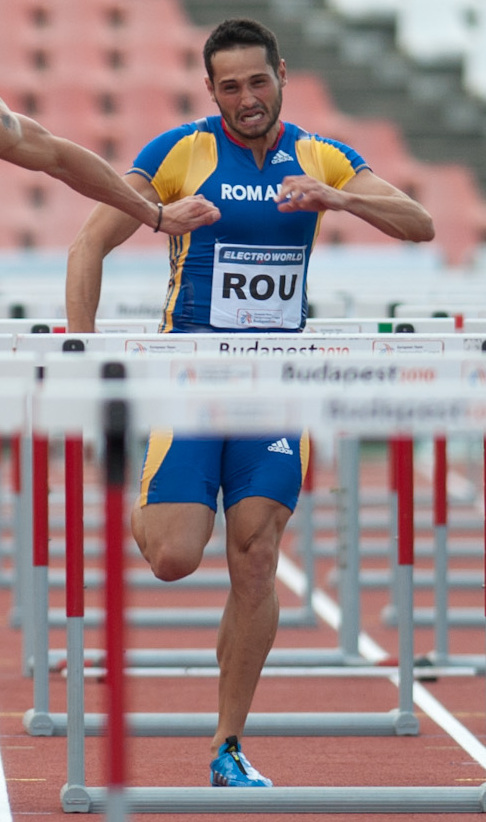

Alexandru Mihăilescu (born 16 August 1982) is a Romanian athlete specialising in the 110 metres hurdles. He represented his country at two World Indoor Championships, in 2006 and 2008, reaching the semifinals on the second occasion.

He has personal bests of 13.55 seconds in the 110 metres hurdles (+1.3 m/s, Haniá 2006) and 7.68 seconds in the 60 metres hurdles (Bucharest 2005).

== Competition record ==
Year	Competition	Venue	Position	Event	Notes
Representing Romania
1999	World Youth Championships	Bydgoszcz, Poland	28th (h)	110 m hrd (91.4 cm)	14.50
2003	European U23 Championships	Bydgoszcz, Poland	20th (h)	110 m hurdles	14.16
2003	Military World Games	Catania, Italy	3rd	110 m hurdles	14.30
2005	European Indoor Championships	Madrid, Spain	17th (h)	60 m hurdles	7.82
2006	World Indoor Championships	Moscow, Russia	25th (h)	60 m hurdles	7.86
2006	European Championships	Gothenburg, Sweden	11th (sf)	110 m hurdles	13.78
2007	European Indoor Championships	Birmingham, United Kingdom	17th (h)	60 m hurdles	7.93
2008	World Indoor Championships	Valencia, Spain	22nd (sf)	60 m hurdles	7.96
2009	Jeux de la Francophonie	Beirut, Lebanon	2nd	110 m hurdles	13.92
2010	European Championships	Barcelona, Spain	24th (h)	110 m hurdles	13.99
