= Hungary at the 2022 European Athletics Championships =

- Flag of Hungary
- WA code: HUN
- National federation: Hungarian Athletics Association

in Munich, Germany 15 August 2022 – 21 August 2022
- Competitors: 43 (20 men and 23 women) in 29 events
- Medals Ranked 23rd: Gold 0 Silver 2 Bronze 1 Total 3

European Athletics Championships appearances
- 1934; 1938; 1946; 1950; 1954; 1958; 1962; 1966; 1969; 1971; 1974; 1978; 1982; 1986; 1990; 1994; 1998; 2002; 2006; 2010; 2012; 2014; 2016; 2018; 2022; 2024

Hungary competed at the 2022 European Athletics Championships in Munich, Germany, between 15 and 21 August 2022

== Medallists ==
Medal	Name	Event	Date
Silver	Bence Halász	Men's hammer throw	18 August
Silver	Luca Kozák	Women's 100 metres hurdles	21 August
Bronze	Viktória Madarász	Women's 35 kilometres walk	16 August

== Results ==
Hungary entered the following athletes.

Key

- Q = Qualified for the next round
- q = Qualified for the next round as a fastest loser or, in field events, by position without achieving the qualifying target
- NR = National record
- PB = Personal best
- SB = Season best
- N/A = Round not applicable for the event

=== Men ===
Track and road events

Athlete	Event	Heat		Semifinal		Final	
Athlete	Event	Result	Rank	Result	Rank	Result	Rank
Tamás Máté	200 metres	20.94	17	did not advance			
Dániel Huller	800 metres	1:47.19	6 q	1:48.03	8	did not advance	
István Szögi	1500 metres	3:44.20	23	—N/a		did not advance	
Gáspár Csere	Marathon	—N/a				2:18:35 SB	36
Dániel Eszes	110 metres hurdles	14.25	24	did not advance			
Bálint Szeles	110 metres hurdles	13.97	20	did not advance			
Valdó Szűcs	110 metres hurdles	13.73	6 Q	13.78	18	did not advance	
István Palkovits	3000 metres steeplechase	8:40.47	20	—N/a		did not advance	
Máté Helebrandt	35 kilometres walk	—N/a				DQ	
Bence Venyercsán	35 kilometres walk	—N/a				2:41:07 SB	14
Dániel Ajide; Tamás Máté; Zoltán Wahl; Attila Molnár	4 × 400 metres relay	3:04.71	13	—N/a		did not advance	

Field events

Athlete	Event	Qualification		Final	
Athlete	Event	Distance	Position	Distance	Position
Péter Bakosi	High jump	2.12	=19	did not advance	
Tibor Galambos	Triple jump	NM		did not advance	
János Huszák	Discus throw	59.99	20	did not advance	
Róbert Szikszai	Discus throw	61.32	13	did not advance	
Bence Halász	Hammer throw	77.72	4 Q	80.92 PB	2nd place, silver medalist(s)
Krisztián Pars	Hammer throw	NM		did not advance	
Dániel Rába	Hammer throw	71.59	14	did not advance	

=== Women ===
Track and road events

Athlete	Event	Heat		Semifinal		Final	
Athlete	Event	Result	Rank	Result	Rank	Result	Rank
Boglárka Takács	100 metres	11.44	=6 Q	11.49	16	did not advance	
Bianka Bartha-Kéri	800 metres	2:02.99	14	did not advance			
Viktória Wagner-Gyürkés	5000 metres	—N/a				15:16.11 PB	9
Zsófia Erdélyi	Marathon	—N/a				2:48:03	48
Nóra Szabó	Marathon	—N/a				2:34:49 SB	17
Luca Kozák	100 metres hurdles	Bye		12.69 NR	3	12.69 =NR	2nd place, silver medalist(s)
Janka Molnár	400 metres hurdles	57.38	19	did not advance			
Lili Anna Tóth	3000 metres steeplechase	10:08.18 SB	25	—N/a		did not advance	
Barbara Oláh	20 kilometres walk	—N/a				1:38:31	16
Viktória Madarász	35 kilometres walk	—N/a				2:49:58 PB	3rd place, bronze medalist(s)
Rita Récsei	35 kilometres walk	—N/a				3:04:49	13
Anna Luca Kocsis; Jusztina Csóti; Boglárka Takács; Anna Tóth	4 × 100 metres relay	44.19 SB	11	—N/a		did not advance	
Evelin Nádházy; Bianka Bartha-Kéri; Fanni Rapai; Janka Molnár	4 × 400 metres relay	3:29.39 SB	10	—N/a		did not advance	

Field events

Athlete	Event	Qualification		Final	
Athlete	Event	Distance	Position	Distance	Position
Barbara Szabó	High jump	1.78	=19	did not advance	
Hanga Klekner	Pole vault	4.25	=18	did not advance	
Diána Lesti	Long jump	6.29	17	did not advance	
Réka Gyurátz	Hammer throw	68.63	6 q	69.02	7
Réka Szilágyi	Javelin throw	57.40	12 q	60.57 SB	4

Combined events – Heptathlon

Athlete	Event	100H	HJ	SP	200 m	LJ	JT	800 m	Final	Rank
Xénia Krizsán	Result	13.77	1.77 SB	14.02	24.74	6.15	50.38 SB	2:10.90 SB	6372 SB	5
Xénia Krizsán	Points	1011	941	795	911	896	867	951	6372 SB	5
