= Matthias Bühler =

German sprinter

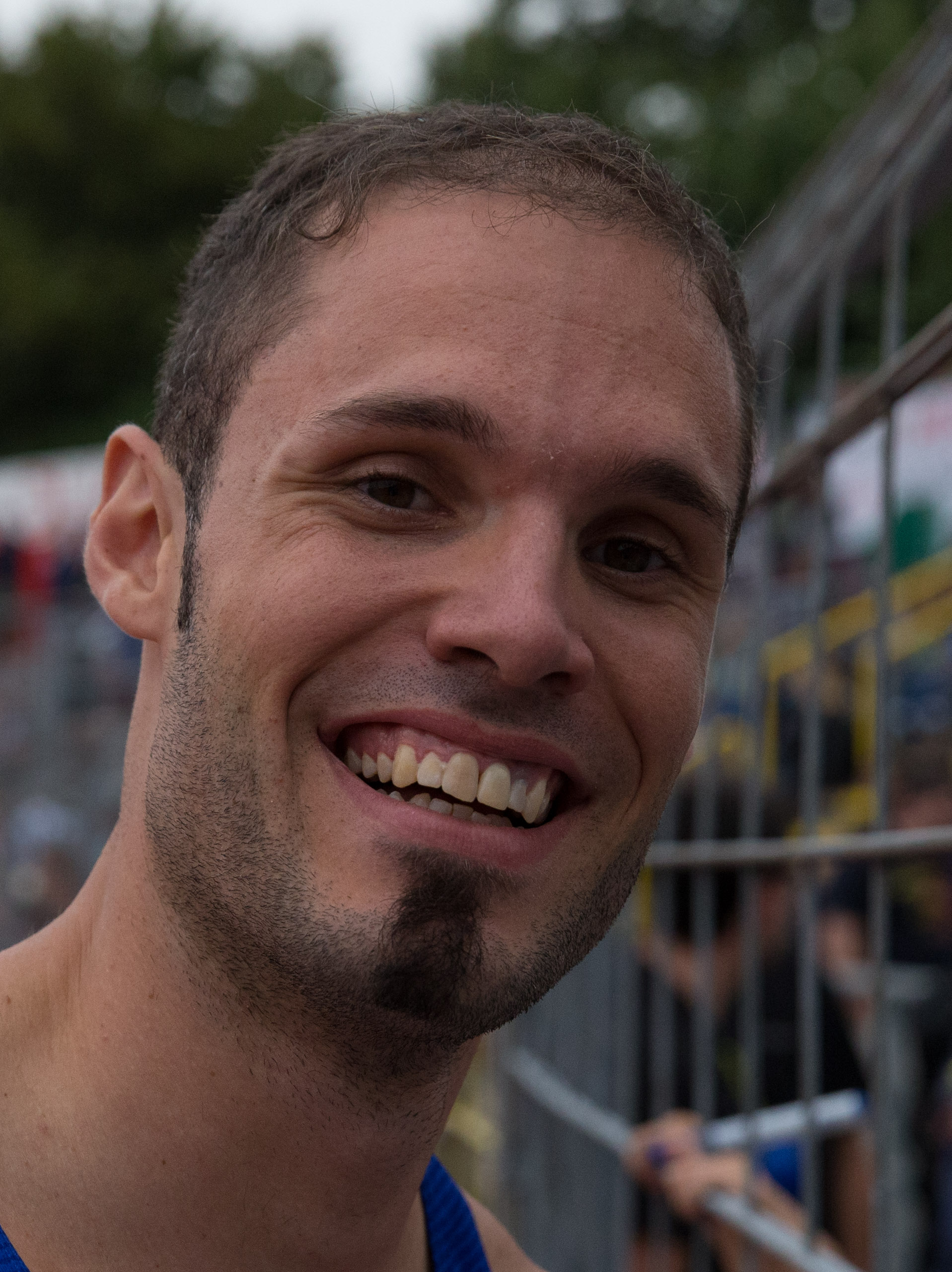
Matthias Bühler in 2014

Matthias Bühler (born 2 September 1986 in Lahr) is a German sprinter. He competed in the 110 m hurdles event at the 2012 Summer Olympics.

== Competition record ==
Year	Competition	Venue	Position	Event	Notes
Representing Germany
2009	World Championships	Berlin, Germany	33rd (h)	110 m hurdles	13.75
2012	European Championships	Helsinki, Finland	10th (h)	110 m hurdles	13.52
2012	Olympic Games	London, United Kingdom	30th (h)	110 m hurdles	13.68
2013	European Indoor Championships	Gothenburg, Sweden	17th (h)	60 m hurdles	7.78
2014	European Championships	Zürich, Switzerland	8th (sf)	110 m hurdles	13.39
2015	World Championships	Beijing, China	11th (sf)	110m hurdles	13.34
2016	European Championships	Amsterdam, Netherlands	17th (sf)	110 m hurdles	13.65
2016	Olympic Games	Rio de Janeiro, Brazil	33rd (h)	110 m hurdles	13.90
2017	World Championships	London, United Kingdom	21st (sf)	110 m hurdles	13.79
