= Sergey Chepiga =

Russian hurdler

Personal information
- Nationality: Russian
- Born: 5 June 1982 (age 43)

Sport
- Sport: Track and field
- Event: 110 metres hurdles

Sergey Chepiga (born 5 June 1982) is a Russian hurdler. He competed in the men's 110 metres hurdles at the 2004 Summer Olympics.
