= Chris Baillie (hurdler) =

Scottish hurdler (born 1981)

Personal information
- Nationality: British
- Born: 21 April 1981 (age 45) Glasgow, Scotland
- Height: 1.83 m (6 ft 0 in)

Sport
- Sport: Running / Hurdling
- College team: Team Bath
- Club: Victoria Park Athletic Club; Birchfield Harriers
Medal record
Men's athletics
Representing Scotland
Commonwealth Games
Silver medal – second place	2006 Melbourne	110 m hurdles

Christopher Baillie (born 21 April 1981) is a Scottish hurdler from Old Kilpatrick, most noted for his silver medal at the 2006 Commonwealth Games in the 110 metre hurdles.

== Early life ==
He was educated at Clydebank High School. He is the younger brother of the late Ross Baillie who was also a hurdler.

== Career ==
Baillie won a gold medal in the 110-metre hurdles at the 1999 European Athletics Junior Championships in Riga, competing for Great Britain and finishing a dead heat with Spain's Felipe Vivancos. He won bronze at the 2001 European Athletics U23 Championships in Amsterdam.

Baillie now after retiring late in 2014 has taken up a more coaching side of things when it comes to athletics, basing himself in the West coast of Scotland at Scotstoun Stadium, home ground of his previous club Victoria Park Athletic.
