= Dániel Kiss (hurdler) =

Hungarian hurdler

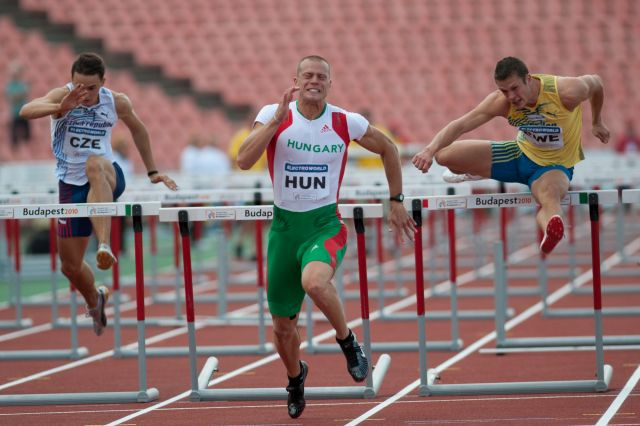
- Kiss during 2010 European Team Championships First League in Budapest

Personal information
- Nationality: Hungarian
- Born: 12 February 1982 (age 44) Budapest, Hungary
- Height: 1.95 m (6 ft 5 in)
- Weight: 73 kg (161 lb)

Sport
- Country: Hungary
- Sport: Hurdling
Medal record
Men's Athletics
Representing Hungary
European Championships
Bronze medal – third place	2010 Barcelona	110 hurdles

Dániel Kiss (born 12 February 1982) is a Hungarian hurdler. He holds the national record in the indoor sprint hurdle event.

He finished 7th in the 110 m hurdles final at the 2006 European Athletics Championships in Gothenburg. In 2010 he reached the final at the World Indoor Championships, where he placed 8th.

== Competition record ==
Year	Competition	Venue	Position	Event	Notes
Representing Hungary
1999	World Youth Championships	Bydgoszcz, Poland	7th (h)	110 m hurdles (91.4 cm)	14.10
2000	World Junior Championships	Santiago, Chile	33rd (h)	110 m hurdles	14.97 (wind: +0.6 m/s)
2002	European Indoor Championships	Vienna, Austria	18th (h)	60 m hurdles	7.83
2003	European U23 Championships	Bydgoszcz, Poland	11th (sf)	110m hurdles	13.89 (wind: 1.9 m/s)
2003	European U23 Championships	Bydgoszcz, Poland	6th (h)	4 × 100 m relay	40.15
2005	Universiade	İzmir, Turkey	10th (sf)	110 m hurdles	13.87
2006	European Championships	Gothenburg, Sweden	7th	110 m hurdles	13.77
2007	European Indoor Championships	Birmingham, United Kingdom	16th (sf)	60 m hurdles	8.05
2008	Olympic Games	Beijing, China	21st (sf)	110 m hurdles	13.63
2009	World Championships	Berlin, Germany	12th (sf)	110 m hurdles	13.45
2010	World Indoor Championships	Doha, Qatar	8th	60 m hurdles	7.81
2010	European Championships	Barcelona, Spain	3rd	110 m hurdles	13.39
2012	European Championships	Helsinki, Finland	14th (h)	110 m hurdles	13.59
2012	Olympic Games	London, United Kingdom	25th (h)	110 m hurdles	13.62
2014	European Championships	Zurich, Switzerland	20th (h)	110 m hurdles	13.64
2015	European Indoor Championships	Prague, Czech Republic	21st (h)	60 m hurdles	7.86

== Personal bests ==
Event	Best	Location	Date
110 m hurdles	13.32 NR	European Team Championships First League, Stadium Puskás Ferenc, Budapest, Hungary	20 June 2010
60 m hurdles	7.56 NR	Budapest, Hungary	13 February 2010

== Awards ==
- Hungarian athlete of the Year (1): 2010
