= Robert Newton (hurdler) =

British hurdling athlete (born 1981)

Rob Newton
Personal information
- Nationality: British (English)
- Born: 10 May 1981 (age 44) Nottingham, England
- Height: 190 cm (6 ft 3 in)
- Weight: 85 kg (187 lb)

Sport
- Sport: Athletics
- Event: Hurdles
- Club: Sale Harriers; Bath University

Robert Alan Newton (born 10 May 1981) is a British former athlete who participated in the hurdles events. He competed at the 2004 Summer Olympics.

== Biography ==
In 2004, he was Britain's number one sprint hurdler and competed for Team GB at the 2004 Olympics in Athens, where he reached the second round of the 110 m hurdles competition. He was the only openly gay British Olympian that year.

He became British 110 metres hurdles champion after winning the British AAA Championships in 2004.

After not racing at all in 2005, Newton transitioned to the 400 metre hurdles along with the 110 metre hurdles in 2006, achieving a 51.88 personal best in that event. He has no recorded races since 2006.

In 2012, he worked as a sports massage therapist.

== National titles ==
- 1997: Amateur Athletics Association U17 400m hurdles gold medal winner
- 1999: English Schools' 110m hurdles gold medal winner
- 1999: AAA U20 110m hurdles gold medal winner
- 2000: AAA U20 110m hurdles silver medalist
- 2001: AAA U23 110m hurdles gold medal winner
- 2003: Inter-Countries 110m hurdles gold medal winner
- 2004: British National Championships 110m hurdles gold medal winner

== Personal bests ==
- 110 m hurdles Personal Best: 13.36 in 2004
- In the UK All-time Top Ten with a 60m hurdles personal best of 7.69, in the 2004 Norwich Union Indoor Trials.
