= Krisztina Papp =

Hungarian long-distance runner

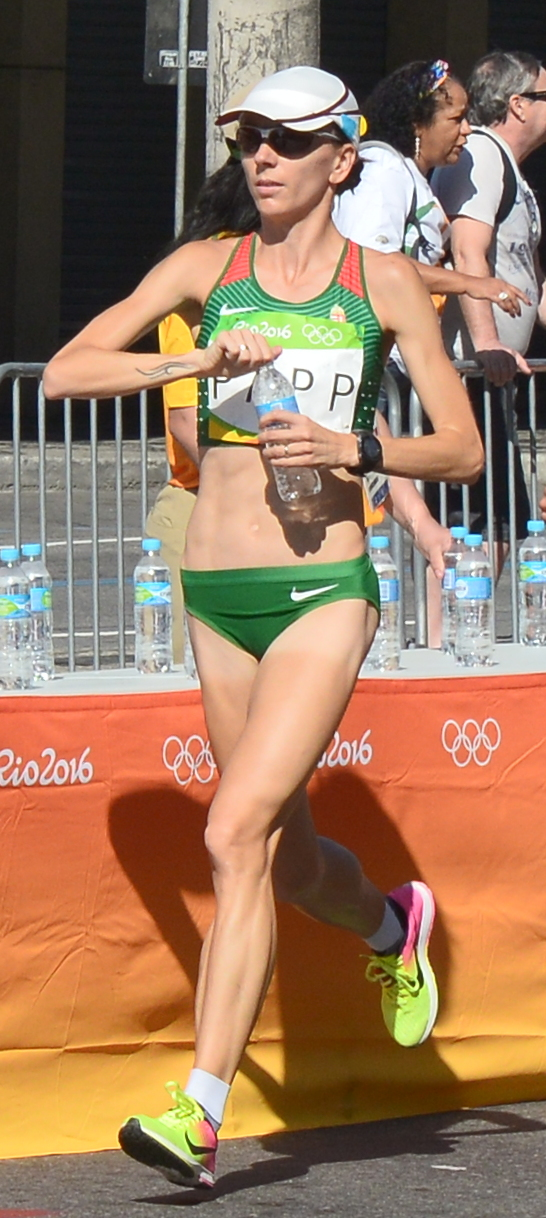
- Papp at the 2016 Olympics

Personal information
- Born: 17 December 1982 (age 43) Eger, Hungary
- Height: 173 cm (5 ft 8 in)
- Weight: 53 kg (117 lb)

Sport
- Sport: Athletics
- Event: 800 m – marathon
- Club: Ujpesti TE, Budapest
- Coached by: Zoltan Kaldy

Achievements and titles
- Personal best(s): HM – 1:09:50 (2014); Marathon – 2:36:59 (2015)

Krisztina Papp (born 17 December 1982) is a Hungarian long-distance runner. She is the national indoor record holder over 5000 m. She was selected as Female Athlete of the Year by the Hungarian Athletics Association in 2006, 2009 and 2010.

Papp began her international career as a junior with appearances at the 2000 World Junior Championships in Athletics and the 2001 IAAF World Cross Country Championships. In her first year as a senior athlete she ran for Hungary in the finals of the 3000 metres at the 2002 European Athletics Indoor Championships and the 5000 metres outdoors at the 2002 European Athletics Championships. She was the gold medallist in the 10,000 metres at the 2003 European Athletics U23 Championships the following year.

Papp had her Olympic debut at the 2004 Athens Games, running in the heats of the 5000 m, and also debuted over the half marathon distance that year, becoming the Hungarian under-23 champion. Track running remained her focus over the next two seasons: she was eighth in the 5000 m at the 2006 European Athletics Championships and took the bronze medal at the 2006 European Cup 10,000m, as well as making appearances at the IAAF World Athletics Final.

She took her first victory at the Budapest Half Marathon in September 2007 (going on to win twice more in 2009 and 2010). That year she made her international road running debut, coming 20th at the 2006 IAAF World Road Running Championships in Udine with a career best time of 1:10:53 hours. Returning to the track, she ran at the 2008 Beijing Olympics and reached the 5000 m finals at the 2009 World Championships in Athletics and 2010 European Athletics Championships. She was also eighth over 10,000 m at the latter event.

She opened 2011 with a third-place finish at the Stramilano half marathon.

== Awards ==
- Hungarian athlete of the Year (3): 2006, 2009, 2010
