= 2023 Indoor Meeting Karlsruhe =

Athletics meeting in Karlsruhe, Germany

- Dates: 27 January 2023
- Host city: Karlsruhe, Germany
- Level: 2023 World Athletics Indoor Tour

The 2023 Indoor Meeting Karlsruhe was the 39th edition of the annual indoor track and field meeting in Karlsruhe, Germany. Held on 27 January, it was the first leg of the 2023 World Athletics Indoor Tour – the highest-level international indoor track and field circuit.

At the meet, Dina Asher-Smith set the British record and tied the meeting record for 60 metres, with a time of 7.04 seconds.

== Results ==
=== World Athletics Indoor Tour ===
Men's 400m
Place	Athlete	Country	Time	Heat	Points
1st place, gold medalist(s)	Benjamin Lobo Vedel	Denmark	46.45	2	10
2nd place, silver medalist(s)	Óscar Husillos	Spain	46.63	2	7
3rd place, bronze medalist(s)	Alexander Doom	Belgium	46.68	1	5
4	Marvin Schlegel	Germany	46.79	1	3
5	Christian Iguacel	Belgium	46.86	2	
6	Tony van Diepen	Netherlands	47.15	1	
7	Alex Haydock-Wilson	Great Britain	47.23	1	
8	Liemarvin Bonevacia	Netherlands	47.46	2	

Men's 1500m
Place	Athlete	Country	Time	Points
1st place, gold medalist(s)	George Mills	Great Britain	3:35.88	10
2nd place, silver medalist(s)	Isaac Nader	Portugal	3:37.29	7
3rd place, bronze medalist(s)	Federico Riva	Italy	3:37.36	5
4	Jesús Gómez	Spain	3:37.44	3
5	Adel Mechaal	Spain	3:38.85	
6	Teddese Lemi	Ethiopia	3:39.34	
7	Christoph Kessler	Germany	3:46.07	
	Mounir Akbache	France	DNF	
	Ignacio Fontes	Spain	DNF	
	Erik Sowinski	United States	DNF	

Men's 60mH
Place	Athlete	Country	Time	Points
1st place, gold medalist(s)	Enrique Llopis	Spain	7.57	10
2nd place, silver medalist(s)	Asier Martínez	Spain	7.57	7
3rd place, bronze medalist(s)	Jakub Szymański	Poland	7.60	5
4	Eric Edwards Jr.	United States	7.63	3
5	Just Kwaou-Mathey	France	7.65	
6	Petr Svoboda	Czech Republic	7.66	
7	Jason Joseph	Switzerland	7.71	
8	Pascal Martinot-Lagarde	France	7.72	

Men's 60mH Round 1
Place	Athlete	Country	Time	Heat
1	Just Kwaou-Mathey	France	7.57	1
2	Jakub Szymański	Poland	7.57	2
3	Eric Edwards Jr.	United States	7.59	1
4	Asier Martínez	Spain	7.61	1
5	Petr Svoboda	Czech Republic	7.64	1
6	Enrique Llopis	Spain	7.66	2
7	Jason Joseph	Switzerland	7.67	1
8	Pascal Martinot-Lagarde	France	7.72	2
9	Lorenzo Simonelli	Italy	7.75	2
10	Tim Eikermann	Germany	7.80	1
11	Aurel Manga	France	7.82	1
12	Martin Vogel	Germany	7.88	2
13	Yannick Spissinger	Germany	7.90	1
14	Eduardo de Deus	Brazil	7.90	2

Women's 60m
Place	Athlete	Country	Time	Points
1st place, gold medalist(s)	Dina Asher-Smith	Great Britain	7.04	10
2nd place, silver medalist(s)	Ewa Swoboda	Poland	7.09	7
3rd place, bronze medalist(s)	Mujinga Kambundji	Switzerland	7.11	5
4	Daryll Neita	Great Britain	7.16	3
5	Lisa Mayer	Germany	7.25	
6	N'Ketia Seedo	Netherlands	7.25	
7	Géraldine Frey	Switzerland	7.27	
8	Alexandra Burghardt	Germany	7.32	

Women's 60m Round 1
Place	Athlete	Country	Time	Heat
1	Dina Asher-Smith	Great Britain	7.07	2
2	Ewa Swoboda	Poland	7.09	1
3	Mujinga Kambundji	Switzerland	7.15	2
4	Daryll Neita	Great Britain	7.21	1
5	Lisa Mayer	Germany	7.22	2
6	Géraldine Frey	Switzerland	7.24	2
7	N'Ketia Seedo	Netherlands	7.25	1
8	Alexandra Burghardt	Germany	7.31	2
9	Tristan Evelyn	Barbados	7.32	1
10	María Isabel Pérez	Spain	7.36	2
11	Marie-Josée Ta Lou	Ivory Coast	7.37	1
12	Malaika Mihambo	Germany	7.43	1
13	Jamile Samuel	Netherlands	7.46	2
14	Wiktorija Ratnikowa	Ukraine	7.52	1
15	Shannon Ray	United States	7.55	1
16	Asha Philip	Great Britain	DQ	2

Women's 800m
Place	Athlete	Country	Time	Points
1st place, gold medalist(s)	Anita Horvat	Slovenia	2:00.44	10
2nd place, silver medalist(s)	Freweyni Hailu	Ethiopia	2:00.46	7
3rd place, bronze medalist(s)	Lore Hoffmann	Switzerland	2:01.40	5
4	Majtie Kolberg	Germany	2:02.09	3
5	Jemma Reekie	Great Britain	2:02.10	
6	Bianka Bartha-Kéri	Hungary	2:02.36	
	Aneta Lemiesz	Poland	DNF	

Women's 3000m
Place	Athlete	Country	Time	Points
1st place, gold medalist(s)	Lemlem Hailu	Ethiopia	8:37.55	10
2nd place, silver medalist(s)	Werkuha Getachew	Ethiopia	8:37.98	7
3rd place, bronze medalist(s)	Dawit Seyaum	Ethiopia	8:39.20	5
4	Mizan Alem	Ethiopia	8:39.79	3
5	Zerfe Wondemagegn	Ethiopia	8:42.90	
6	Marta Pérez	Spain	8:44.91	
7	Marta García	Spain	8:45.51	
8	Luiza Gega	Albania	8:50.94	
	Caterina Granz	Germany	DNF	
	Vera Hoffmann	Luxembourg	DNF	

Women's Triple Jump
Place	Athlete	Country	Mark	Points
1st place, gold medalist(s)	Liadagmis Povea	Cuba	14.64m	10
2nd place, silver medalist(s)	Leyanis Pérez	Cuba	14.45m	7
3rd place, bronze medalist(s)	Maryna Bekh-Romanchuk	Ukraine	14.41m	5
4	Tori Franklin	United States	14.39m	3
5	Kristiina Mäkelä	Finland	14.02m	
6	Ottavia Cestonaro	Italy	13.77m	
7	Neja Filipič	Slovenia	13.35m	
8	Jessie Maduka	Germany	13.09m	

Women's Shot Put
Place	Athlete	Country	Mark	Points
1st place, gold medalist(s)	Auriol Dongmo	Portugal	18.90m	10
2nd place, silver medalist(s)	Sarah Mitton	Canada	18.88m	7
3rd place, bronze medalist(s)	Danniel Thomas-Dodd	Jamaica	18.77m	5
4	Jessica Schilder	Netherlands	18.76m	3
5	Fanny Roos	Sweden	18.66m	
6	Chase Ealey	United States	18.61m	
7	Sara Gambetta	Germany	18.57m	
8	Julia Ritter	Germany	17.75m	

=== Indoor Meeting ===
Men's 3000m
Place	Athlete	Country	Time
1st place, gold medalist(s)	Abdisa Fayisa	Ethiopia	7:40.35
2nd place, silver medalist(s)	Robin Hendrix	Belgium	7:40.53
3rd place, bronze medalist(s)	Adisu Girma	Ethiopia	7:41.53
4	Mohamed Abdilaahi	Germany	7:41.88
5	Elzan Bibić	Serbia	7:42.03
6	Ossama Meslek	Italy	7:45.15
7	Bram Anderiessen	Netherlands	8:04.74
	Lukas Abele	Germany	DNF
	Andreas Lindgreen	Denmark	DNF
	Eduardo Menacho	Spain	DNF
	Youssef Taoussi	Spain	DNF

Men's Pole Vault
Place	Athlete	Country	Mark
1st place, gold medalist(s)	KC Lightfoot	United States	5.83m
2nd place, silver medalist(s)	Kurtis Marschall	Australia	5.83m
3rd place, bronze medalist(s)	Emmanouil Karalis	Greece	5.83m
4	Torben Blech	Germany	5.72m
5	Bo Kanda Lita Baehre	Germany	5.72m
6	Menno Vloon	Netherlands	5.66m
7	Thiago Braz	Brazil	5.66m
8	Matt Ludwig	United States	5.60m
9	Valentin Lavillenie	France	5.50m

Women's Long Jump
Place	Athlete	Country	Mark
1st place, gold medalist(s)	Ivana Vuleta	Serbia	6.76m
2nd place, silver medalist(s)	Agate de Sousa	São Tomé and Príncipe	6.66m
3rd place, bronze medalist(s)	Maryse Luzolo	Germany	6.62m
4	Mikaelle Assani	Germany	6.53m
5	Milica Gardašević	Serbia	6.51m
6	Alina Rotaru-Kottmann	Romania	6.39m
7	Evelise Veiga	Portugal	6.35m
8	Inna Sydorenko	Ukraine	5.51m
