= 2026 European Athletics Championships – Men's 110 metres hurdles =

Men's 110 metres hurdles at the 2026 European Athletics Championships
- Venue: Alexander Stadium
- Location: Birmingham, United Kingdom
- Dates: 11 August 2026 (round 1); 12 August 2026 (semi-finals & final)
- Competitors: 36 (target)
- Winning time: 13.12

Medalists
gold medal	Jason Joseph	Switzerland
silver medal	Just Kwaou-Mathey	France
bronze medal	Jakub Szymański	Poland

The men's 110 metres hurdles at the 2026 European Athletics Championships took place over three rounds at the Alexander Stadium in Birmingham, United Kingdom, on 11 and 12 August 2026.

== Background ==
Records before the 2026 European Athletics Championships
Record	Athlete (nation)	Time	Location	Date
World record	Ja'Kobe Tharp (USA)	12.75	Eugene, United States	10 June 2026
World leading	Ja'Kobe Tharp (USA)	12.75	Eugene, United States	10 June 2026
European record	Colin Jackson (GBR)	12.91	Stuttgart, Germany	20 August 1993
Championship record	Colin Jackson (GBR)	13.02	Budapest, Hungary	22 August 1998
European leading	Michael Obasuyi (BEL)	13.10	Paris, France	28 June 2026

== Qualification ==
For the men's 110 metres hurdles, the qualification period was from 27 July 2025 to 26 July 2026. Athletes qualified by running the entry standard of 13.40 or faster, by wildcard for the 2024 European Athletics Champion (not used since Lorenzo Simonelli will not be participating), or by their position on the World Athletics Rankings for the event. The target number was 36 athletes.

Qualification standings per 31 July 2026
QP	CP	Country	Athlete	Status	Details
1	1	France	Just Kwaou-Mathey	Qualified by Entry Standard	12.99 - Stade Pierre Paul Bernard, Talence (FRA) - 03 AUG 2025
2	1	Spain	Enrique Llopis	Qualified by Entry Standard	13.12 - Letzigrund, Zürich (SUI) - 28 AUG 2025
3	1	Switzerland	Jason Joseph	Qualified by Entry Standard	13.16 - Kleine Allmend, Frauenfeld (SUI) - 24 AUG 2025
4	1	Austria	Enzo Diessl	Qualified by Entry Standard	13.20 - Stadion Śląski, Chorzów (POL) - 16 AUG 2025
5	2	France	Theo Pedre	Qualified by Entry Standard	13.25 - Stade Raymond Petit, Tomblaine (FRA) - 03 JUL 2026
6	1	Belgium	Elie Bacari	Qualified by Entry Standard	13.25 - Atletiekarena Gaston Roelants, Kessel-Lo (BEL) - 26 JUL 2026
7	3	France	Erwann Cinna	Qualified by Entry Standard	13.27 - Stade Pierre Paul Bernard, Talence (FRA) - 03 AUG 2025
8	2	Spain	Asier Martínez	Qualified by Entry Standard	13.27 - Suhaim bin Hamad Stadium, Doha (QAT) - 19 JUN 2026
reserve	4	France	Thomas Wilkes	Qualified by Entry Standard	13.27 - Stade Charléty, Paris (FRA) - 28 JUN 2026
9	1	Poland	Jakub Szymański	Qualified by Entry Standard	13.28 - Stadion Śląski, Chorzów (POL) - 16 AUG 2025
10	1	Netherlands	Matthew Sophia	Qualified by Entry Standard	13.28 - Un. of Kentucky Outdoor Track Facility, Lexington, KY (USA) - 27 MAY 2026
11	1	Great Britain & N.I.	Tade Ojora	Qualified by Entry Standard	13.30 - Stade universitaire de St-Léonard, Fribourg (SUI) - 13 AUG 2025
12	2	Netherlands	Joas van Hellemondt	Qualified by Entry Standard	13.39 - Sportcentrum Wembley, Kortrijk (BEL) - 11 JUL 2026
13	2	Poland	Damian Czykier	Qualified by World Rankings	12th - 1243 points
14	1	Cyprus	Milan Trajkovic	Qualified by World Rankings	17th - 1215 points
15	2	Great Britain & N.I.	Samuel Bennett	Qualified by World Rankings	19th - 1209 points
16	1	Germany	Gregory Minoué	Qualified by World Rankings	24th - 1192 points
17	1	Czech Republic	Jonáš Kolomazník	Qualified by World Rankings	26th - 1191 points
18	1	Ukraine	Dmytro Bahinskyi	Qualified by World Rankings	28th - 1189 points
19	2	Belgium	Zeno Van Neygen	Qualified by World Rankings	29th - 1188 points
20	1	Finland	Elmo Lakka	Qualified by World Rankings	32nd - 1177 points
21	2	Czech Republic	Štěpán Štefko	Qualified by World Rankings	33rd - 1176 points
22	1	Slovenia	Filip Jakob Demšar	Qualified by World Rankings	35th - 1161 points
23	1	Turkey	Mikdat Sevler	Qualified by World Rankings	37th - 1160 points
24	2	Finland	Santeri Kuusiniemi	Qualified by World Rankings	38th - 1159 points
25	1	Italy	Oliver Mulas	Qualified by World Rankings	39th - 1159 points
26	2	Switzerland	Fabio Küchler	Qualified by World Rankings	41st - 1156 points
27	3	Netherlands	Liam van der Schaaf	Qualified by World Rankings	42nd - 1155 points
28	1	Portugal	Edson Gomes	Qualified by World Rankings	47th - 1146 points
29	3	Belgium	Nolan Vancauwenberghe	Qualified by World Rankings	48th - 1145 points
30	1	Israel	Sagi Lamdiel	Qualified by World Rankings	49th - 1145 points
31	1	Romania	Alin Ionuț Anton	Qualified by World Rankings	52nd - 1142 points
32	1	Greece	Christos-Panagiotis Roumtsios	Qualified by World Rankings	53rd - 1139 points
33	1	Hungary	Dániel Eszes	Qualified by World Rankings	54th - 1137 points
34	2	Ukraine	Oleh Kukota	Qualified by World Rankings	56th - 1135 points
35	1	Slovakia	Peter Dávid	Qualified by World Rankings	57th - 1134 points
36	3	Finland	Ilari Manninen	Qualified by World Rankings	58th - 1134 points
reserve	3	Switzerland	Mathieu Jaquet	Next best by World Rankings	61st - 1131 points
reserve	2	Italy	Nicolo' Giacalone	Next best by World Rankings	62nd - 1130 points
reserve	1	Bulgaria	Stanislav Stankov	Next best by World Rankings	69th - 1118 points
reserve	3	Italy	Hassane Fofana	Next best by World Rankings	71st - 1116 points
reserve	2	Portugal	Abdel Kader Larrinaga	Next best by World Rankings	77th - 1106 points
reserve	2	Greece	Ioannis Kamarinos	Next best by World Rankings	87th - 1101 points

Bye to semi-finals	Reserve activated	Withdrawal / reserve unused

== Schedule ==
Date	Time	Round
11 August 2026	11:40	Round 1
12 August 2026	19:55	Semi-finals
12 August 2026	21:47	Final

All times are local times (UTC+1)

== Results ==
=== Round 1 ===
Round 1 was held on 11 August 2026, at 11:40 in the morning. The 12 fastest (q) qualified for the semi-finals.

==== Heat 1 ====
Place	Lane	Athlete	Nation	Time	Notes
1	6	Damian Czykier	Poland	13.75	q
2	3	Gregory Minoué	Germany	13.84	q
3	8	Fabio Küchler	Switzerland	14.00	q
4	4	Oleh Kukota	Ukraine	14.02	
5	5	Alin Anton	Romania	14.12	
6	7	Ilari Manninen	Finland	14.13	
7	2	Dániel Eszes	Hungary	14.18	
8	9	Filip Jakob Demšar	Slovenia	14.41	
				Wind: (−0.9 m/s)	

==== Heat 2 ====
Place	Lane	Athlete	Nation	Time	Notes
1	9	Milan Trajkovic	Cyprus	13.50	q
2	8	Zeno Van Neygen	Belgium	13.54	q, SB
3	2	Liam van der Schaaf	Netherlands	13.70	q
4	5	Elmo Lakka	Finland	13.84	q
5	4	Štěpán Štefko	Czech Republic	13.86	q
6	6	Peter Dávid	Slovakia	13.94	q
7	3	Christos-Panagiotis Roumtsios	Greece	14.12	
—	7	Mikdat Sevler	Turkey	DQ	TR16.8
				Wind: (−1.1 m/s)	

==== Heat 3 ====
Place	Lane	Athlete	Nation	Time	Notes
1	4	Samuel Bennett	Great Britain & N.I.	13.57	q
2	8	Dmytro Bahinskyi	Ukraine	13.80	q
3	5	Jonáš Kolomazník	Czech Republic	13.86	q
4	2	Santeri Kuusiniemi	Finland	13.89	q
5	6	Oliver Mulas	Italy	14.03	
6	3	Sagi Lamdiel	Israel	14.45	
—	7	Edson Gomes	Portugal	DQ	TR22.6.2
				Wind: (−2.0 m/s)	

=== Semi-finals ===
The semi-finals were held on 12 August 2026, at 19:55 in the evening. First 2 in each heat (Q) and the next 2 fastest (q) advanced to the final.

==== Heat 1 ====
Place	Lane	Athlete	Nation	Time	Notes
1	5	Just Kwaou-Mathey	France	13.33	Q
2	7	Milan Trajkovic	Cyprus	13.40	Q
3	3	Zeno van Neygen	Belgium	13.41	PB
4	4	Asier Martínez	Spain	13.45	
5	8	Tade Ojora	Great Britain & N.I.	13.48	
6	6	Matthew Sophia	Netherlands	13.55	
7	2	Jonáš Kolomazník	Czech Republic	13.71	
8	9	Peter Dávid	Slovakia	14.04	
				Wind: (−0.1 m/s)	

==== Heat 2 ====
Place	Lane	Athlete	Nation	Time	Notes
1	5	Jason Joseph	Switzerland	13.38	Q
2	7	Thomas Wilkes	France	13.40	Q
3	6	Enrique Llopis	Spain	13.47	
4	8	Joas van Hellemondt	Netherlands	13.49	
5	3	Damian Czykier	Poland	13.62	
6	9	Elmo Lakka	Finland	13.89	
—	4	Elie Bacari	Belgium	DNF	
—	2	Štěpán Štefko	Czech Republic	DQ	
				Wind: (−0.7 m/s)	

==== Heat 3 ====
Place	Lane	Athlete	Nation	Time	Notes
1	4	Jakub Szymański	Poland	13.26 [.255]	Q, SB
2	7	Samuel Bennett	Great Britain & N.I.	13.26 [.260]	Q, PB
3	5	Theo Pedre	France	13.31	q
4	6	Enzo Diessl	Austria	13.35	q
5	8	Liam van der Schaaf	Netherlands	13.55	
6	3	Fabio Küchler	Switzerland	13.66	
7	9	Santeri Kuusiniemi	Finland	13.96	
—	2	Dmytro Bahinskyi	Ukraine	DNF	
	3	Gregory Minoué	Germany	DNS	
				Wind: (−0.5 m/s)	

=== Final ===
The final was held on 12 August 2026, at 21:47 in the evening.

Place	Lane	Athlete	Nation	Time	Notes
1st place, gold medalist(s)	6	Jason Joseph	Switzerland	13.12	SB
2nd place, silver medalist(s)	5	Just Kwaou-Mathey	France	13.16	SB
3rd place, bronze medalist(s)	4	Jakub Szymański	Poland	13.26	=SB
4	3	Thomas Wilkes	France	13.36	
5	2	Enzo Diessl	Austria	13.44	
6	9	Theo Pedre	France	13.46	
7	7	Samuel Bennett	Great Britain & N.I.	13.62	
8	8	Milan Trajkovic	Cyprus	13.87	
				Wind: (−0.3 m/s)	
