= 2025 European Athletics Indoor Championships – Men's 60 metres hurdles =

Men's 60 metres hurdles at the 2025 European Athletics Indoor Championships
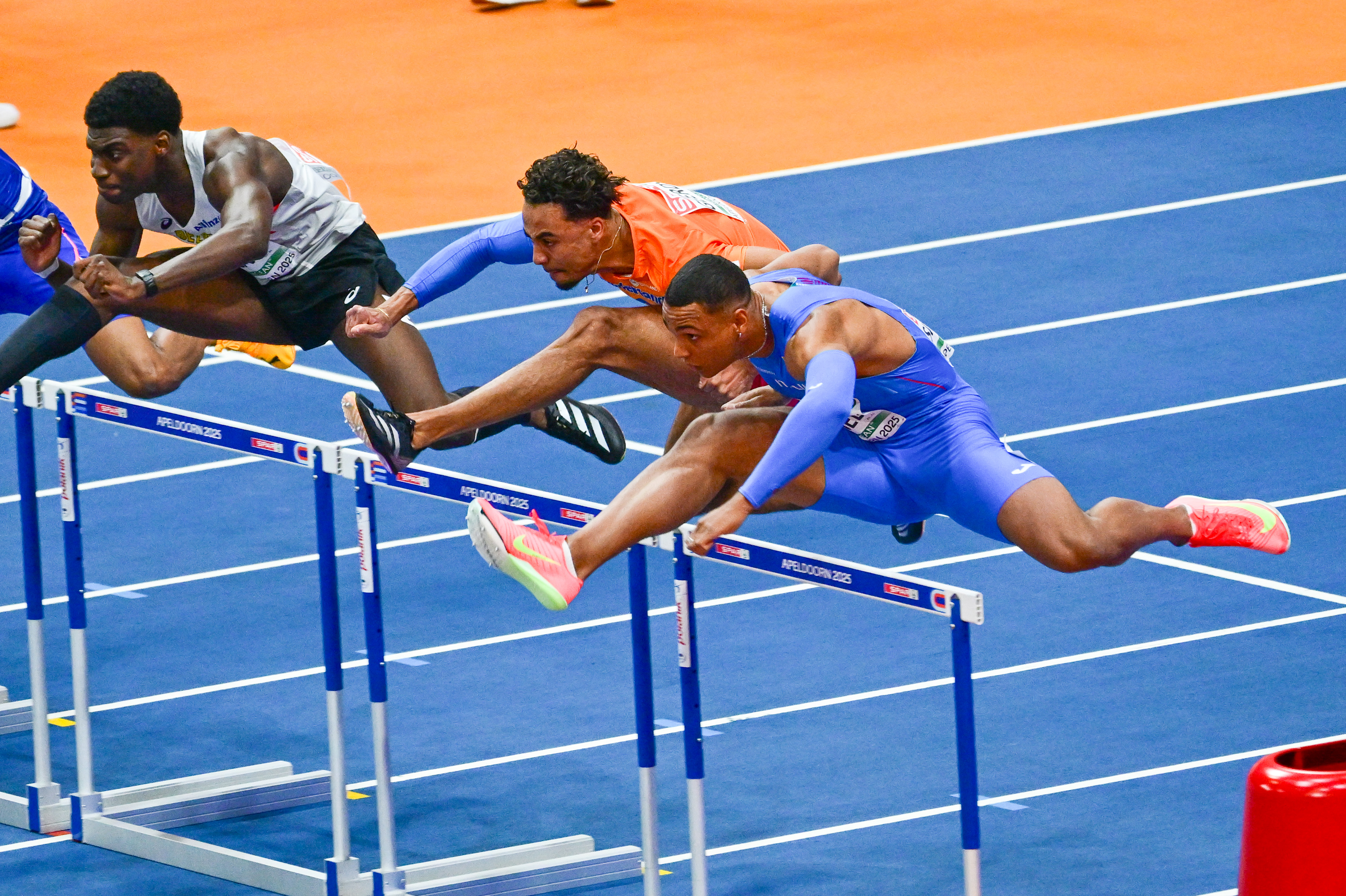
- From left Wilhem Belocian (FRA), Job Geerds (NED) Lorenzo Simonelli (ITA) in the second semifinal.
- Venue: Omnisport Apeldoorn
- Location: Apeldoorn, Netherlands
- Dates: 6 March 2025 (round 1); 7 March 2025 (semi-finals and final)
- Competitors: 32 from 17 nations
- Winning time: 7.43

Medalists
gold medal	Jakub Szymański	Poland
silver medal	Wilhem Belocian	France
bronze medal	Just Kwaou-Mathey	France

The men's 60 metres hurdles at the 2025 European Athletics Indoor Championships was held on the short track of Omnisport in Apeldoorn, Netherlands, on 6 and 7 March 2025. This was the 36th time the event was contested at the European Athletics Indoor Championships. Athletes qualified by achieving the entry standard or by their World Athletics Ranking in the event.

== Background ==
The men's 60 metres hurdles was contested 35 times before 2025, at every previous edition of the European Athletics Indoor Championships (1970–2023), with the exception of 1972 and 1981, when the 50 metres hurdles were held instead. The 2025 European Athletics Indoor Championships was held in Omnisport Apeldoorn in Apeldoorn, Netherlands. The removable indoor athletics track was retopped for these championships in September 2024.

Grant Holloway is the world record holder in the event, with a time of 7.27 set in 2024. Colin Jackson is the European record holder with a time of 7.30, set in 1990. Jackson also holds the championship record of 7.39, also set in 1994.

Records before the 2025 European Athletics Indoor Championships
Record	Athlete (nation)	Time (s)	Location	Date
World record	Grant Holloway (USA)	7.27	Albuquerque, United States	13 February 2024
European record	Colin Jackson (GBR)	7.30	Sindelfingen, Germany	6 March 1994
Championship record	Colin Jackson (GBR)	7.39	Paris, France	12 March 1994
World leading	Grant Holloway (USA)	7.36	Liévin, France	16 February 2025
European leading	Jakub Szymański (POL)	7.39	Łódź, Poland	22 February 2025

== Qualification ==
For the men's 60 metres hurdles, the qualification period ran from 25 February 2024 until 23 February 2025. Athletes qualified by achieving the entry standards of 7.63 s indoors or by running 13.25 s over 110 metres hurdles outdoors. Athletes can also qualify by virtue of their World Athletics Ranking for the event. There was a target number of 32 athletes.

== Results ==
=== Round 1 ===
Round 1 was held on 6 March, starting at 21:17 (UTC+1) in the evening. First 3 in each heat (Q) and the next 4 by time (q) qualified for the final.

==== Heat 1 ====
Rank	Athlete	Nation	Time	Notes
1	Enrique Llopis	Spain	7.53	Q
2	Theo Pedre	France	7.68	Q
3	Gregory Minoue	Germany	7.69	Q
4	Damian Czykier	Poland	7.70	
5	Abdel Kader Larrinaga	Portugal	7.79	
6	Hassane Fofana	Italy	7.80	SB
7	Joas van Hellemondt	Netherlands	7.85	
8	Mathieu Jaquet	Switzerland	7.86	

==== Heat 2 ====
Rank	Athlete	Nation	Time	Notes
1	Wilhem Belocian	France	7.46	Q, SB
2	Elie Bacari	Belgium	7.51	Q, =AU23R, =NR
3	Krzysztof Kiljan	Poland	7.64	Q
4	Lorenzo Simonelli	Italy	7.66	q, SB
5	Elmo Lakka	Finland	7.69	q
6	Alin Ionut Anton	Romania	7.72	SB
7	Bálint Szeles	Hungary	7.93	
8	Daniel Goriola	Great Britain	7.96	

==== Heat 3 ====
Rank	Athlete	Nation	Time	Notes
1	Just Kwaou-Mathey	France	7.47	Q, SB
2	Jason Joseph	Switzerland	7.56	Q
3	Job Geerds	Netherlands	7.60	Q, SB
4	Abel Jordán	Spain	7.65	q
5	Michael Obasuyi	Belgium	7.68	q
6	Jakob Filip Demšar	Slovenia	7.74	SB
7	Christos-Panagiotis Roumtsios	Greece	7.83	PB
8	Dániel Eszes	Hungary	8.16	

==== Heat 4 ====
Rank	Athlete	Nation	Time	Notes
1	Jakub Szymański	Poland	7.51	Q
2	Asier Martínez	Spain	7.69	Q
3	Mikdat Sevler	Turkey	7.74	Q
4	Nicolo' Giacalone	Italy	7.75	PB
5	Timme Koster	Netherlands	7.78	PB
6	Manuel Mordi	Germany	7.80	
7	Santeri Kuusiniemi	Finland	7.85	
—	Enzo Diessl	Austria	DNF	

=== Semi-finals ===
The semi-finals were held on 7 March, starting at 14:05 (UTC+1) in the afternoon. First 3 in each heat (Q) and the next 2 by time (q) qualified for the final.

==== Heat 1 ====
Rank	Athlete	Nation	Time	Notes
1	Wilhem Belocian	France	7.44	Q, SB
2	Enrique Llopis	Spain	7.49	Q
3	Job Geerds	Netherlands	7.54	Q, PB
4	Asier Martínez	Spain	7.56	q
5	Lorenzo Simonelli	Italy	7.60	
6	Krzysztof Kiljan	Poland	7.62	
7	Elie Bacari	Belgium	7.75	
8	Elmo Lakka	Finland	7.81	

==== Heat 2 ====
Rank	Athlete	Nation	Time	Notes
1	Jakub Szymański	Poland	7.49 [.482]	Q
2	Just Kwaou-Mathey	France	7.49 [.486]	Q
3	Michael Obasuyi	Belgium	7.55	Q, SB
4	Abel Jordán	Spain	7.58	q
5	Theo Pedre	France	7.60	PB
6	Gregory Minoue	Germany	7.68	
7	Jason Joseph	Switzerland	7.70	
8	Mikdat Sevler	Turkey	7.82	

=== Final ===
The final was held on 7 March, starting at 21:53 (UTC+1) in the evening.

Rank	Athlete	Nation	Time	Notes
1st place, gold medalist(s)	Jakub Szymański	Poland	7.43	
2nd place, silver medalist(s)	Wilhem Belocian	France	7.45	
3rd place, bronze medalist(s)	Just Kwaou-Mathey	France	7.50	
4	Abel Jordán	Spain	7.54	
5	Job Geerds	Netherlands	7.61	
6	Michael Obasuyi	Belgium	7.63	
7	Asier Martínez	Spain	7.68	
—	Enrique Llopis	Spain	DNS	
