= 2026 World Athletics Indoor Championships – Men's 60 metres hurdles =

Men's 60 metres hurdles at the 2026 World Athletics Indoor Championships
- Venue: Kujawsko-Pomorska Arena Toruń
- Location: Toruń, Poland
- Dates: 21 March
- Winning time: 7.40

Medalists
gold medal	Jakub Szymański	Poland
silver medal	Enrique Llopis	Spain
bronze medal	Trey Cunningham	United States

The men's 60 metres hurdles at the 2026 World Athletics Indoor Championships took place on the short track of the Kujawsko-Pomorska Arena Toruń in Toruń, Poland, on 21 March 2026. This was the 22nd time the event was contested at the World Athletics Indoor Championships. Athletes could qualify by achieving the entry standard or by their World Athletics Ranking in the event.

== Background ==
The men's 60 metres hurdles was contested 21 times before 2026, at every previous edition of the World Athletics Indoor Championships.

Records before the 2026 World Athletics Indoor Championships
Record	Athlete (nation)	Time (s)	Location	Date
World record	Grant Holloway (USA)	7.27	Albuquerque, United States	16 February 2024
Championship record	Grant Holloway (USA)	7.29	Belgrade, Serbia	20 March 2022
Championship record	Grant Holloway (USA)	7.29	Glasgow, United Kingdom	2 March 2024
2026 World Lead	Ja'Kobe Tharp (USA)	7.32	Fayetteville, United States	14 March 2026

== Qualification ==
For the men's 60 metres hurdles, the qualification period ran from 1 November 2025 until 8 March 2026. Athletes could qualify by achieving the entry standard of 7.65 s. Athletes could also qualify by virtue of their World Athletics Ranking for the event or by virtue of their World Athletics Indoor Tour wildcard. There is a target number of 48 athletes.

== Results ==
=== Round 1 ===
Round 1 was held on 21 March, starting at 10:20 (UTC+1) in the morning.

==== Heat 1 ====
Place	Lane	Athlete	Nation	Time	Notes
1	7	Demario Prince	Jamaica	7.58	Q
2	6	Lorenzo Ndele Simonelli	Italy	7.65	Q
3	5	Jonáš Kolomazník	Czech Republic	7.72	Q
4	1	John Cabang	Philippines	7.77 [.764]	
5	3	Eduardo de Deus	Brazil	7.77 [.765]	
6	4	Peter Dávid	Slovakia	7.77 [.861]	PB
7	2	Stanislav Stankov	Bulgaria	7.95	
8	8	Tahj Brown	Bahamas	8.30	

==== Heat 2 ====
Place	Lane	Athlete	Nation	Time	Notes
1	3	Dylan Beard	United States	7.50	Q
2	7	Liu Junxi	China	7.53	Q, SB
3	4	Saguirou Badamassi	Niger	7.63	Q, NR
4	2	Asier Martínez	Spain	7.65	q
5	8	Anthony Ommundsen Johnsen	Norway	7.71	
6	6	Youssef Badawy Sayed	Egypt	7.78	SB
7	1	Oleh Kukota	Ukraine	7.83	
8	5	Keon Rude	Canada	7.94	

==== Heat 3 ====
Place	Lane	Athlete	Nation	Time	Notes
1	1	Franco le Roux	South Africa	7.50	Q, AR
2	3	Enrique Llopis	Spain	7.55	Q
3	7	Romain Lecoeur	France	7.59	Q
4	7	Louis François Mendy	Senegal	7.64	q
5	5	Lin Yi-Kai	Chinese Taipei	7.73	
6	4	Oliver Mulas	Italy	7.77	
7	6	Christos-Panagiotis Roumtsios	Greece	7.85	
8	8	Usumane Djumop	Guinea-Bissau	8.98	

==== Heat 4 ====
Place	Lane	Athlete	Nation	Time	Notes
1	1	Wilhem Belocian	France	7.49	Q
2	6	Milan Trajković	Cyprus	7.66	Q
3	8	Jerome Campbell	Jamaica	7.67	Q
4	4	Thiago Ornelas	Brazil	7.69	q
5	2	Santeri Kuusiniemi	Finland	7.75	
6	3	Martín Sáenz	Chile	7.79	
7	7	Richard Diawara	Mali	7.82	SB
8	5	Bojan Novaković	Serbia	7.87	PB

==== Heat 5 ====
Place	Lane	Athlete	Nation	Time	Notes
1	4	Jakub Szymański	Poland	7.50	Q
2	6	Shusei Nomoto	Japan	7.57	Q, PB
3	5	Michael Obasuyi	Belgium	7.60	Q
4	2	Mondray Barnard	South Africa	7.69	q
5	3	Elmo Lakka	Finland	7.70	q
6	7	Fabio Kobelt	Switzerland	7.81	
7	8	Dmytro Bahinskyi	Ukraine	7.84	

==== Heat 6 ====
Place	Lane	Athlete	Nation	Time	Notes
1	6	Trey Cunningham	United States	7.45	Q
2	7	Damian Czykier	Poland	7.54	Q, SB
3	4	Chen Yuanjiang	China	7.64	Q, SB
4	5	Marcos Herrera	Ecuador	7.69	q
5	3	Štěpán Štefko	Czech Republic	7.71	
6	8	Ryota Fujii	Japan	7.81	
7	2	Dániel Eszes	Hungary	7.83	

=== Semi-finals ===
The semi-finals were held on 21 March, starting at 19:48 (UTC+1) in the evening.

==== Heat 1 ====
Place	Lane	Athlete	Nation	Time	Notes
1	3	Wilhem Belocian	France	7.42	Q, =PB
2	6	Dylan Beard	United States	7.46	Q
3	5	Lorenzo Ndele Simonelli	Italy	7.53	q
4	4	Damian Czykier	Poland	7.57	
5	1	Asier Martínez	Spain	7.62 [.613]	
6	7	Michael Obasuyi	Belgium	7.62 [.615]	
7	8	Mondray Barnard	South Africa	7.68	
	2	Jerome Campbell	Jamaica	DQ	

==== Heat 2 ====
Place	Lane	Athlete	Nation	Time	Notes
1	4	Trey Cunningham	United States	7.35	Q, PB
2	5	Demario Prince	Jamaica	7.53	Q
3	3	Liu Junxi	China	7.57	
4	7	Jonáš Kolomazník	Czech Republic	7.61	PB
5	2	Romain Lecoeur	France	7.63	
6	8	Louis François Mendy	Senegal	7.74 [.731]	
7	1	Elmo Lakka	Finland	7.74 [.737]	
	6	Milan Trajković	Cyprus	DQ	

==== Heat 3 ====
Place	Lane	Athlete	Nation	Time	Notes
1	3	Jakub Szymański	Poland	7.42	Q
2	5	Enrique Llopis	Spain	7.46	Q
3	6	Shusei Nomoto	Japan	7.49	q, NR
4	4	Franco le Roux	South Africa	7.55	q*
5	2	Chen Yuanjiang	China	7.59	
6	8	Marcos Herrera	Ecuador	7.65	
7	7	Saguirou Badamassi	Niger	7.67	
8	1	Thiago Ornelas	Brazil	7.68	

*Advanced to the final as the next fastest after the withdrawal of Dylan Beard.

=== Final ===
The final was held on 21 March, starting at 21:02 (UTC+1) in the evening.

Place	Lane	Athlete	Nation	Time	Notes
1st place, gold medalist(s)	5	Jakub Szymański	Poland	7.40	
2nd place, silver medalist(s)	2	Enrique Llopis	Spain	7.42	NR
3rd place, bronze medalist(s)	4	Trey Cunningham	United States	7.43 [.421]	
4	7	Demario Prince	Jamaica	7.43 [.430]	PB
5	3	Wilhem Belocian	France	7.45	
6	1	Shusei Nomoto	Japan	7.49	NR
7	6	Franco le Roux	South Africa	7.51	
8	8	Lorenzo Ndele Simonelli	Italy	7.52	
	6	Dylan Beard	United States	DNS	
