= Czech Republic at the 2026 European Athletics Championships =

- Flag of Czech Republic
- WA code: CZE

in Birmingham, United Kingdom 10–16 August 2026
- Competitors: 54 (29 men and 25 women)
- Medals: Gold 0 Silver 0 Bronze 0 Total 0

European Athletics Championships appearances
- 1994; 1998; 2002; 2006; 2010; 2012; 2014; 2016; 2018; 2022; 2024; 2026

Other related appearances
- Czechoslovakia (1934–1990)

Czech Republic competed at the 2026 European Athletics Championships in Birmingham, United Kingdom from 10–16 August 2026.

The Czech Republic failed to win any medals at the championships, marking a historic low point as the national team went without a single medal for the first time since 1938.

== Results ==
Czech Republic entered the following athletes.

Key

- Q = Qualified for the next round
- q = Qualified for the next round as a fastest loser or, in field events, by position without achieving the qualifying target
- NR = National record
- PB = Personal best
- SB = Season best
- N/A = Round not applicable for the event

=== Men ===
Track and road events

Athlete	Event	Heat		Semifinal		Final	
Athlete	Event	Result	Rank	Result	Rank	Result	Rank
Ondřej Macík	200 m	21.22	19 q	Did not advance			
Jakub Dudycha	800 m	1:48.85	8	Did not advance			
Jonáš Kolomazník	110 m hurdles	13.86	9 q	13.71	7	Did not advance	
Štěpán Štefko	110 m hurdles	13.86	10 q	DQ		Did not advance	
Albert Kukla	Half marathon walk	—N/a				1:28:01	12
Jaromír Morávek	Marathon walk	—N/a				3:16:36 SB	20
Ondřej Loupal; Ondřej Horáček; Matěj Krsek; Milan Ščibráni	4 × 400 m relay	3:03.72	7	—N/a		Did not advance	

Field events

Athlete	Event	Qualification		Final	
Athlete	Event	Distance	Position	Distance	Position
Marek Bahník	High jump	NM		Did not advance	
Matyáš Čudlý	High jump	2.10	20	Did not advance	
Jan Štefela	High jump	2.19	14	Did not advance	
Dan Bárta	Pole vault	5.25	19	Did not advance	
David Holý	Pole vault	5.25	19	Did not advance	
Petr Meindlschmid	Long jump	7.91 SB	12 q	7.81	8
Tomáš Staněk	Shot put	20.66	2 Q	19.68	9
Marek Bárta	Discus throw	57.35	22	Did not advance	
Volodymyr Myslyvčuk	Hammer throw	79.61	1 Q	79.42	4
Patrik Hájek	Hammer throw	70.56	25	Did not advance	
Martin Konečný	Javelin throw	76.84	19	Did not advance	
Jakub Vadlejch	Javelin throw	80.92	5 q	82.88	5
Jan Výška	Javelin throw	76.83	20	Did not advance	

Combined events – Decathlon

Athlete	Event	100 m	LJ	SP	HJ	400 m	110H	DT	PV	JT	1500 m	Final	Rank
Tomas Järvinen	Result	10.82	7.18	DNF									
Tomas Järvinen	Points	901	857	DNF									
Ondřej Kopecký	Result	11.21 SB	7.10	13.09	1.84	DNF							
Ondřej Kopecký	Points	814	838	673	661	DNF							
Vilém Stráský	Result	10.88	7.54 PB	14.10	1.93 =SB	48.45 SB	14.47	42.60	4.50	58.25 PB	4:34.63	8013	13
Vilém Stráský	Points	888	945	734	740	887	915	718	760	712	714	8013	13

=== Women ===
Track and road events

Athlete	Event	Heat		Semifinal		Final	
Athlete	Event	Result	Rank	Result	Rank	Result	Rank
Karolína Maňasová	100 m	Bye		11.23	5	Did not advance	
Barbora Malíková	400 m	52.43	15	Did not advance			
Lurdes Gloria Manuel	400 m	Bye		49.81	2 Q	50.86	4
Pavla Štoudková	800 m	2:01.00	7	Did not advance			
Kristiina Sasínek Mäki	1500 m	4:10.84	6 Q	—N/a		4:11.06	7
Tereza Hrochová	Marathon	—N/a				2:28:14	9
Ester Bendová	100 m hurdles	DNF		Did not advance			
Tereza Elena Šínová	100 m hurdles	13.26	21	Did not advance			
Alžběta Franklová	Half marathon walk	—N/a				1:44:47 SB	28
Ema Klimentová	Half marathon walk	—N/a				1:36:29 PB	15
Eliška Martínková	Half marathon walk	—N/a				1:38.41 PB	18
Tereza Petržilková; Lada Vondrová; Nikola Bisová; Barbora Malíková	4 × 400 m relay	3:29.47	5	—N/a		Did not advance	

Field events

Athlete	Event	Qualification		Final	
Athlete	Event	Distance	Position	Distance	Position
Michaela Hrubá	High jump	1.84	22	Did not advance	
Apolena Švábíková	Pole vault	4.10	25	Did not advance	
Linda Suchá	Triple jump	13.71	18	Did not advance	
Katrin Brzyszkowská	Shot put	16.76	15	Did not advance	
Martina Mazurová	Shot put	16.12	19	Did not advance	
Tereza Holcová	Hammer throw	64.39	24	Did not advance	
Nikola Ogrodníková	Javelin throw	55.87	16	Did not advance	
Petra Sičaková	Javelin throw	56.09	15	Did not advance	
Nikol Tabačková	Javelin throw	52.41	13	Did not advance	

Combined events – Heptathlon

Athlete	Event	100H	HJ	SP	200 m	LJ	JT	800 m	Final	Rank
Adéla Tkáčová	Result	13.67	1.71	12.24	23.39	6.00	30.11	2:13.07	5859	20
Adéla Tkáčová	Points	1026	867	677	1040	850	479	920	5859	20
