= 2025 World Athletics Championships – Men's 110 metres hurdles =

Men's 110 metres hurdles at the 2025 World Athletics Championships
- Venue: National Stadium
- Location: Tokyo, Japan
- Dates: 15 September (heats); 16 September (semi-finals & final)
- Winning time: 12.99

Medalists
gold medal	Cordell Tinch	United States
silver medal	Orlando Bennett	Jamaica
bronze medal	Tyler Mason	Jamaica

The men's 110 metres hurdles at the 2025 World Athletics Championships were held at the National Stadium in Tokyo on 15 and 16 September 2025.

== Summary ==
Grant Holloway came back as the returning champion. And the champion before that. And the champion before that. He had his three and was going for four. He also had the Olympic title, the second fastest time in history and the indoor world record. The world leader was Olympic bronze medalist Rasheed Broadbell, but he cut himself on a hurdle practicing at the highly competitive Jamaican trials. He appealed for a medical exemption asked to displace Tyler Mason who had already made the qualifying standard, and it was ultimately denied. The Olympic silver medalist Daniel Roberts also did not get through the American trials. Japan had high hopes because Rachid Muratake was ranked #3 in the world.

Holloway did not come into the Championships with his usual string of victories. He was only ranked #13 in the world. When he finished a non-qualifying sixth in his semi-final, a new champion was going to be crowned.

In the final, nobody got an edge out of the blocks. Over the second hurdle, 6 men were within inches of each other. It wasn't until the fifth hurdle that it was clear Cordell Tinch was getting his foot down slightly faster than Orlando Bennett and Mason. Enrique Llopis lost a little ground in the middle of the race, rallied over the last three hurdles trying to catch Mason in the lane next to him. The order stayed true across the finish line; Tinch almost a metre up on Bennett and less than half a metre back Mason holding off Llopis and Muratake.

== Records ==
Before the competition records were as follows:

Record	Athlete & Nat.	Perf.	Location	Date
World record	Aries Merritt (USA)	12.80	Brussels, Belgium	7 September 2012
Championship record	Colin Jackson (GBR)	12.91	Stuttgart, Germany	20 August 1993
World Leading	Cordell Tinch (USA)	12.87	Shaoxing, China	3 May 2025
African Record	Antonio Alkana (RSA)	13.11	Prague, Czech Republic	5 June 2017
Asian Record	Liu Xiang (CHN)	12.88	Lausanne, Switzerland	11 July 2006
European Record	Colin Jackson (GBR)	12.91	Stuttgart, Germany	20 August 1993
North, Central American and Caribbean record	Aries Merritt (USA)	12.80	Brussels, Belgium	7 September 2012
Oceanian record	Kyle Vander-Kuyp (AUS)	13.29	Gothenburg, Sweden	11 August 1995
South American Record	Rafael Pereira (BRA)	13.17	Rio de Janeiro, Brazil	23 June 2022

== Qualification standard ==
The standard to qualify automatically for entry was 13.27.

== Schedule ==
The event schedule, in local time (UTC+9), is as follows:

Date	Time	Round
15 September	20:23	Heats
16 September	20:40	Semi-finals
16 September	22:20	Final

== Results ==
=== Heats ===
The heats took place on 15 September. The first four athletes in each heat ( Q ) and the next four fastest ( q ) qualified to the semi-finals.

==== Heat 1 ====
Place	Lane	Athlete	Nation	Time	Notes
1	4	Dylan Beard	United States	13.28	Q
2	3	Chen Yuanjiang	China	13.39	Q
3	6	Sasha Zhoya	France	13.43	Q, WD
4	5	Thiago Ornelas	Brazil	13.52	Q
5	7	Shunsuke Izumiya	Japan	13.52	q
6	9	John Adesola	South Africa	13.57	
7	8	Jakub Szymański	Poland	13.74	
8	2	Manuel Mordi	Germany	14.25	
				Wind: (−0.6 m/s)	

==== Heat 2 ====
Place	Lane	Athlete	Nation	Time	Notes
1	9	Jason Joseph	Switzerland	13.27	Q
2	2	Wilhem Belocian	France	13.27	Q
3	4	Ja'Kobe Tharp	United States	13.28	Q
4	5	Louis François Mendy	Senegal	13.33	Q
5	3	Michael Obasuyi	Belgium	13.54	
6	6	Mondray Barnard	South Africa	13.57	
7	7	Damian Czykier	Poland	13.58	
8	8	Tade Ojora	Great Britain & N.I.	13.90	
				Wind: (−0.2 m/s)	

==== Heat 3 ====
Place	Lane	Athlete	Nation	Time	Notes
1	8	Orlando Bennett	Jamaica	13.20	Q
2	4	Just Kwaou-Mathey	France	13.25	Q
3	5	Lorenzo Simonelli	Italy	13.25	Q
4	9	Shusei Nomoto	Japan	13.29	Q
5	7	Gregory Minoue	Germany	13.50	q
6	6	Elie Bacari	Belgium	13.55	
7	2	Asier Martínez	Spain	13.63	
8	3	Oumar Doudai Abakar	Qatar	14.03	
				Wind: (−0.6 m/s)	

==== Heat 4 ====
Place	Lane	Athlete	Nation	Time	Notes
1	1	Enrique Llopis	Spain	13.22	Q
2	6	Xu Zhuoyi	China	13.28	Q
3	5	Cordell Tinch	United States	13.31	Q
4	7	Demario Prince	Jamaica	13.31	Q
5	4	Eduardo de Deus	Brazil	13.45	q
6	3	Job Geerds	Netherlands	13.51	q
7	8	Amine Bouanani	Algeria	13.75	
8	2	Badamassi Saguirou	Niger	13.77	
9	9	Richard Diawara	Mali	13.89	
				Wind: (±0.0 m/s)	

==== Heat 5 ====
Place	Lane	Athlete	Nation	Time	Notes
1	1	Tyler Mason	Jamaica	13.17	Q, SB
2	7	Rachid Muratake	Japan	13.22	Q
3	3	Liu Junxi	China	13.23	Q, PB
4	6	Grant Holloway	United States	13.27	Q
5	2	Enzo Diessl	Austria	13.37	q
6	4	Tejas Shirse	India	13.57	
7	5	Antonio Alkana	South Africa	13.64	
8	9	Jérémie Lararaudeuse	Mauritius	13.70	
9	8	Usumane Djumo	Guinea-Bissau	14.57	
				Wind: (−0.3 m/s)	

=== Semi-finals ===
The semi-finals took place on 16 September. The first two athletes in each heat ( Q ) and the next two fastest ( q ) qualified to the final.

==== Heat 1 ====
Place	Lane	Athlete	Nation	Time	Notes
1	7	Orlando Bennett	Jamaica	13.27	Q
2	6	Enrique Llopis	Spain	13.29	Q
3	8	Shusei Nomoto	Japan	13.30	
4	4	Dylan Beard	United States	13.31	
5	5	Liu Junxi	China	13.40	
6	9	Gregory Minoue	Germany	13.56	
7	2	Thiago Ornelas	Brazil	13.58	
	3	Shunsuke Izumiya	Japan	DNF	
				Wind: (−0.8 m/s)	

==== Heat 2 ====
Place	Lane	Athlete	Nation	Time	Notes
1	3	Cordell Tinch	United States	13.16	Q
2	6	Jason Joseph	Switzerland	13.18	Q
3	8	Demario Prince	Jamaica	13.22	
4	5	Lorenzo Simonelli	Italy	13.22	
5	7	Wilhem Belocian	France	13.31	
6	4	Xu Zhuoyi	China	13.34	
7	9	Enzo Diessl	Austria	13.64	
8	2	Eduardo de Deus	Brazil	13.91	
				Wind: (−0.5 m/s)	

==== Heat 3 ====
Place	Lane	Athlete	Nation	Time	Notes
1	5	Tyler Mason	Jamaica	13.12	Q, PB
2	7	Rachid Muratake	Japan	13.19	Q
3	3	Ja'Kobe Tharp	United States	13.19	q
4	4	Just Kwaou-Mathey	France	13.22	q
5	6	Chen Yuanjiang	China	13.32	
6	8	Grant Holloway	United States	13.52	
	9	Louis François Mendy	Senegal	DNF	
	2	Job Geerds	Netherlands	DNS	
				Wind: (−0.1 m/s)	

=== Final ===
Place	Lane	Athlete	Nation	Time	Notes
1st place, gold medalist(s)	7	Cordell Tinch	United States	12.99	
2nd place, silver medalist(s)	6	Orlando Bennett	Jamaica	13.08	PB
3rd place, bronze medalist(s)	4	Tyler Mason	Jamaica	13.12	=PB
4	3	Enrique Llopis	Spain	13.16	
5	5	Rachid Muratake	Japan	13.18	
6	9	Ja'Kobe Tharp	United States	13.31	
7	2	Just Kwaou-Mathey	France	13.42	
	8	Jason Joseph	Switzerland	DNF	
				Wind: (−0.3 m/s)	
