= Athletics at the 2024 Summer Olympics – Men's 110 metres hurdles =

Men's 110 metres hurdles at the Games of the XXXIII Olympiad
- Venue: Stade de France, Paris, France
- Dates: 4 August 2024 (heats); 6 August 2024 (repechage round); 7 August 2024 (semi-finals); 8 August 2024 (final)
- Winning time: 12.99

Medalists
1st place, gold medalist(s)		Grant Holloway	United States
2nd place, silver medalist(s)		Daniel Roberts	United States
3rd place, bronze medalist(s)		Rasheed Broadbell	Jamaica

Official Video

The men's 110 metres hurdles at the 2024 Summer Olympics was held in four rounds at the Stade de France in Paris, France, between 4 and 8 August 2024. This was the thirtieth time that the men's 110 metres hurdles was contested at the Summer Olympics.

== Summary ==
Grant Holloway had one item on his resume' to settle. He was not the returning Olympic Champion. That title went to Hansle Parchment, with Holloway silver. Since 2019, Holloway had won three straight World Championships, two straight Indoor Championships, set the Indoor World Record and ran the second fastest time in history, only .01 off of Aries Merritt's world record. The Olympic bronze medalist Ronald Levy and 2022 silver medalist Trey Cunningham did not return. The 2022 bronze medalist was Asier Martínez. The 2023 silver medalist was Parchment with Daniel Roberts bronze in 2023. Making the US team is frequently harder than the Olympics, demonstrated by the top four times of the year being the top four in the US Trials. Freddie Crittenden made it but 4th place Cordell Tinch, 5th place Ja'qualon Scott, heat winner Jamal Britt and Walmart employee Dylan Beard, all 13.10 or better were left at home. Lorenzo Ndele Simonelli, Rachid Muratake, Enrique Llopis, Rasheed Broadbell and Shunsuke Izumiya were the only other athletes worldwide to run 13.10 or better.

In the final Roberts got a fantastic start to get over there first hurdle ahead. Holloway's acceleration put him ahead by the second. Roberts hit the fourth hurdle but maintained his advantage over Rachid Muratake leading a wall of hurdlers across the track. With the fastest 5 hurdles in the world in his pocket, Holloway was well ahead. While he slowed the last two hurdles, he was so far ahead he was unchallenged for gold. Going into hurdle 8, Rasheed Broadbell was surging, Roberts was ahead but losing ground. Dragging the last hurdle Roberts pushed for the finish line to try to hold off Broadbell, leaning early for the line, Roberts leaned again, diving across the finish line before crashing to the track. The fully automatic timing photo finish revealed Roberts had beaten Broadbell by .003.

== Background ==
The men's 110 metres hurdles has been present on the Olympic athletics programme since the first edition in 1896.

Global records before the 2024 Summer Olympics
Record	Athlete (Nation)	Time (s)	Location	Date
World record	Aries Merritt (USA)	12.80	Brussels, Belgium	7 September 2012
Olympic record	Liu Xiang (CHN)	12.91	Athens, Greece	27 August 2004
World leading	Grant Holloway (USA)	12.86	Eugene, United States	28 June 2024

Area records before the 2024 Summer Olympics
Area Record	Athlete (Nation)	Time (s)
Africa (records)	Antonio Alkana (RSA)	13.11
Asia (records)	Liu Xiang (CHN)	12.88
Europe (records)	Colin Jackson (GBR)	12.91
North, Central America and Caribbean (records)	Aries Merritt (USA)	12.80 WR
Oceania (records)	Kyle Vander-Kuyp (AUS)	13.29
South America (records)	Rafael Pereira (BRA)	13.17

== Qualification ==
For the men's 110 metres hurdles event, the qualification period is between 1 July 2023 and 30 June 2024. 40 athletes are able to qualify for the event, with a maximum of three athletes per nation, by running the entry standard of 13.27 seconds or faster or by their World Athletics Ranking for this event.

== Results ==
=== Heats ===
The heats were held on 4 August, starting at 11:50 (UTC+2) in the morning.

==== Heat 1 ====
Rank	Lane	Athlete	Nation	Time	Notes
1	8	Rachid Muratake	Japan	13.22	Q
2	9	Enrique Llopis	Spain	13.28	Q
3	4	Eduardo Rodrigues	Brazil	13.37	Q
4	6	Manuel Mordi	Germany	13.48	
5	7	Raphaël Mohamed	France	13.61	
6	3	John Cabang	Philippines	13.66	
7	5	Jakub Szymański	Poland	13.75	
8	2	Martín Sáenz	Chile	13.83	
				Wind: +0.1 m/s	

==== Heat 2 ====
Rank	Lane	Athlete	Nation	Time	Notes
1	9	Louis Francois Mendy	Senegal	13.31	Q, SB
2	7	Orlando Bennett	Jamaica	13.35	Q
3	6	Michael Obasuyi	Belgium	13.41	Q
4	5	Asier Martínez	Spain	13.47	
5	8	Amine Bouanani	Algeria	13.58	
6	2	Enzo Diessl	Austria	13.63	
7	4	David Yefremov	Kazakhstan	13.88	
8	3	Freddie Crittenden	United States	18.27	
				Wind: 0.0 m/s	

==== Heat 3 ====
Rank	Lane	Athlete	Nation	Time	Notes
1	7	Xu Zhuoyi	China	13.40	Q
2	6	Antoine Andrews	Bahamas	13.43 (.421)	Q
3	3	Daniel Roberts	United States	13.43 (.423)	Q
4	2	Milan Trajkovic	Cyprus	13.43 (.425)	q
5	8	Hansle Parchment	Jamaica	13.43 (.430)	q
6	4	Rafael Pereira	Brazil	13.47	SB
7	5	Craig Thorne	Canada	13.60	
8	9	Krzysztof Kiljan	Poland	13.67	
				Wind: +1.1 m/s	

==== Heat 4 ====
Rank	Lane	Athlete	Nation	Time	Notes
1	6	Jason Joseph	Switzerland	13.26	Q
2	7	Lorenzo Simonelli	Italy	13.27 (.263)	Q
3	9	Shunsuke Izumiya	Japan	13.27 (.270)	Q
4	5	Tade Ojora	Great Britain	13.35	q, SB
5	8	Wilhelm Belocian	France	13.48	SB
6	2	Liu Junxi	China	13.54	
7	3	Ellie Bacari	Belgium	13.66	
8	4	Damian Czykier	Poland	13.99	
				Wind: +0.3 m/s	

==== Heat 5 ====
Rank	Lane	Athlete	Nation	Time	Notes
1	6	Grant Holloway	United States	13.01	Q
2	8	Rasheed Broadbell	Jamaica	13.42	Q
3	9	Sasha Zhoya	France	13.43	Q
4	5	Shunya Takayama	Japan	13.46	
5	2	Tayleb Willis	Australia	13.63	
6	3	Qin Weibo	China	13.64	
7	4	Elmo Lakka	Finland	13.84	
	7	Yaqoub Alyouha	Kuwait	DNF	
				Wind: +0.7 m/s	

=== Repechage round ===
The repechage round was held on 6 August, starting at 10:50 (UTC+2) in the morning.

==== Heat 1 ====
Rank	Lane	Athlete	Nation	Time	Notes
1	2	Freddie Crittenden	United States	13.42	Q
2	5	Asier Martínez	Spain	13.46	Q
3	8	Liu Junxi	China	13.52	
4	7	Enzo Diessl	Austria	13.56	
5	4	Craig Thorne	Canada	13.62	
6	6	Krzysztof Kiljan	Poland	13.73	
7	3	Elmo Lakka	Finland	13.75	
				Wind: +0.2 m/s	

==== Heat 2 ====
Rank	Lane	Athlete	Nation	Time	Notes
1	3	Rafael Pereira	Brazil	13.54 (.536)	Q
2	7	Raphaël Mohamed	France	13.54 (.538)	Q
3	6	Amine Bouanani	Algeria	13.54 (.539)	
4	5	Manuel Mordi	Germany	13.55	
5	4	Damian Czykier	Poland	13.71	
	2	David Yefremov	Kazakhstan	DQ	TR16.8
	8	John Cabang	Philippines	DNS	
				Wind: -0.5 m/s	

==== Heat 3 ====
Rank	Lane	Athlete	Nation	Time	Notes
1	3	Qin Weibo	China	13.44	Q
2	2	Wilhelm Belocian	France	13.45 (.445)	Q, SB
3	7	Shunya Takayama	Japan	13.45 (.450)	
4	5	Jakub Szymański	Poland	13.63	
5	6	Tayleb Willis	Australia	13.67	
6	8	Martín Sáenz	Chile	13.95	
7	4	Elie Bacari	Belgium	14.13	
				Wind: -1.1 m/s	

=== Semi-finals ===
The semi-finals were held on 7 August, starting at 19:05 (UTC+2) in the evening.

==== Semifinal 1 ====
Rank	Lane	Athlete	Nation	Time	Notes
1	6	Grant Holloway	United States	12.98	Q
2	5	Enrique Llopis	Spain	13.17	Q
3	3	Hansle Parchment	Jamaica	13.19	q, =SB
4	4	Rachid Muratake	Japan	13.26	q
5	8	Michael Obasuyi	Belgium	13.36	
6	2	Qin Weibo	China	13.41 (.408)	
7	9	Raphaël Mohamed	France	13.41 (.410)	
8	7	Antoine Andrews	Bahamas	13.43	
				Wind: +0.1 m/s	

==== Semifinal 2 ====
Rank	Lane	Athlete	Nation	Time	Notes
1	6	Rasheed Broadbell	Jamaica	13.21	Q
2	2	Freddie Crittenden	United States	13.23	Q
3	4	Louis François Mendy	Senegal	13.34 (.334)	
4	8	Sasha Zhoya	France	13.34 (.334)	
5	7	Lorenzo Ndele Simonelli	Italy	13.40	
6	5	Jason Joseph	Switzerland	13.44	
7	3	Tade Ojora	Great Britain	13.47	
8	9	Rafael Pereira	Brazil	13.87	
				Wind: -0.1 m/s	

==== Semifinal 3 ====
Rank	Lane	Athlete	Nation	Time	Notes
1	7	Orlando Bennett	Jamaica	13.09	Q, PB
2	8	Daniel Roberts	United States	13.10	Q
3	5	Shunsuke Izumiya	Japan	13.32 (.316)	
3	3	Milan Trajkovic	Cyprus	13.32 (.316)	SB
5	2	Asier Martínez	Spain	13.35	
6	6	Eduardo de Deus	Brazil	13.43	
7	4	Xu Zhuoyi	China	13.48	
8	9	Wilhem Belocian	France	13.52	
				Wind: +0.6 m/s	

=== Final ===
The final was held on 8 August, starting at 21:45 (UTC+2) in the evening.

Rank	Lane	Athlete	Nation	Time	Notes
1st place, gold medalist(s)	6	Grant Holloway	United States	12.99	
2nd place, silver medalist(s)	4	Daniel Roberts	United States	13.09 (.085)	
3rd place, bronze medalist(s)	5	Rasheed Broadbell	Jamaica	13.09 (.088)	SB
4	3	Enrique Llopis	Spain	13.20	
5	9	Rachid Muratake	Japan	13.21	
6	8	Freddie Crittenden	United States	13.32	
7	7	Orlando Bennett	Jamaica	13.34	
8	2	Hansle Parchment	Jamaica	13.39	
				Wind: -0.1 m/s	
