= 2022 European Athletics Championships – Men's 110 metres hurdles =

Men's 110 metres hurdles at the 2022 European Athletics Championships
- Venue: Olympiastadion
- Location: Munich
- Dates: 16 August (round 1); 17 August (semifinals & final)
- Competitors: 35 from 19 nations
- Winning time: 13.14

Medalists
gold medal	Asier Martínez	Spain
silver medal	Pascal Martinot-Lagarde	France
bronze medal	Just Kwaou-Mathey	France

The men's 110 metres hurdles at the 2022 European Athletics Championships was held at the Olympiastadion on 16 and 17 August.

== Records ==
Standing records prior to the 2022 European Athletics Championships
World record	Aries Merritt (USA)	12.80	Bruxelles, Belgium	7 September 2012
European record	Colin Jackson (GBR)	12.91	Stuttgart, Germany	20 August 1993
Championship record	Colin Jackson (GBR)	13.02	Budapest, Hungary	22 August 1998
World Leading	Devon Allen (USA)	12.84	New York, United States	12 June 2022
Europe Leading	Sasha Zhoya (FRA)	13.17	Caen, France	25 June 2022

== Schedule ==
Date	Time	Round
16 August 2022	09:35	Round 1
17 August 2022	20:30	Semifinals
17 August 2022	22:22	Final

All times are local times (UTC+2)

== Results ==
=== Round 1 ===
First 4 in each heat (Q) and the next 1 fastest (q) advance to the Semifinals. The 14 highest ranked athletes received a bye into the semi-finals.

Wind:
Heat 1: -0.5 m/s, Heat 2: +0.6 m/s, Heat 3: -0.2 m/s

Rank	Heat	Lane	Name	Nationality	Time	Note
1	2	8	Finley Gaio	Switzerland	13.46	Q, PB
2	2	1	David King	Great Britain	13.63	Q
3	3	1	Gregor Traber	Germany	13.69	Q
4	3	7	Hassane Fofana	Italy	13.72	Q
5	3	3	Miguel Perera	Great Britain	13.72	Q
6	3	2	Valdó Szűcs	Hungary	13.73	Q
7	3	4	Vladimir Vukićević	Norway	13.75	q
8	1	2	Abdel Kader Larrinaga	Portugal	13.76	Q
9	3	5	Elmo Lakka	Finland	13.78	
10	3	6	Max Hrelja	Sweden	13.80	
11	3	8	Keiso Pedriks	Estonia	13.83	SB
12	1	4	Joel Bengtsson	Sweden	13.84	Q
13	1	8	Jakub Szymański	Poland	13.87	Q
14	1	3	Koen Smet	Netherlands	13.88	Q
15	2	5	Santeri Kuusiniemi	Finland	13.89	Q
16	2	6	João Vítor de Oliveira	Portugal	13.90	Q
17	2	3	Michael Obasuyi	Belgium	13.90	
18	1	6	Mathieu Jaquet	Switzerland	13.91	
19	2	4	Lorenzo Ndele Simonelli	Italy	13.95	
20	2	7	Bálint Szeles	Hungary	13.97	
21	2	2	Luka Trgovčević	Serbia	14.01	
22	1	7	Ilari Manninen	Finland	14.08	
23	1	1	Alin Ionuţ Anton	Romania	14.18	
24	1	5	Dániel Eszes	Hungary	14.25	

=== Semifinals ===
First 2 in each heat (Q) and the next 2 fastest (q) advance to the final.

Wind:
Heat 1: -0.2 m/s, Heat 2: -0.1 m/s, Heat 3: -0.3 m/s

Rank	Heat	Lane	Name	Nationality	Time	Note
1	1	5	Asier Martínez	Spain	13.25	Q
2	1	6	Just Kwaou-Mathey	France	13.30	Q
3	3	5	Enrique Llopis	Spain	13.30	Q, PB
4	2	6	Pascal Martinot-Lagarde	France	13.35	Q
5	2	5	Jason Joseph	Switzerland	13.45	Q
6	3	6	Sasha Zhoya	France	13.46	Q
7	1	3	Andrew Pozzi	Great Britain	13.48	q
8	1	7	Finley Gaio	Switzerland	13.50	q
9	2	3	Milan Trajković	Cyprus	13.54	
10	1	4	Hassane Fofana	Italy	13.56	
11	2	8	Miguel Perera	Great Britain	13.58	PB
12	1	2	Vladimir Vukićević	Norway	13.64	
13	1	8	Jakub Szymański	Poland	13.66	
14	2	7	Joel Bengtsson	Sweden	13.67	
15	3	3	Aurel Manga	France	13.70	
16	3	2	Gregor Traber	Germany	13.72	
17	3	7	David King	Great Britain	13.73	
18	3	1	Valdó Szűcs	Hungary	13.78	
19	2	1	Santeri Kuusiniemi	Finland	13.81	
20	3	8	Abdel Kader Larrinaga	Portugal	13.81	
21	1	1	João Vítor de Oliveira	Portugal	13.92	
22	3	4	Damian Czykier	Poland	13.99	
23	2	2	Koen Smet	Netherlands	14.06	
	2	4	Mikdat Sevler	Turkey	DNS	

=== Final ===
Rank	Lane	Name	Nationality	Time	Note
1	4	Asier Martínez	Spain	13.14	13.137 EL
2	5	Pascal Martinot-Lagarde	France	13.14	13.138 =EL
3	3	Just Kwaou-Mathey	France	13.30	
4	8	Jason Joseph	Switzerland	13.35	
5	2	Finley Gaio	Switzerland	13.50	
6	1	Andrew Pozzi	Great Britain	13.66	
7	6	Enrique Llopis	Spain	14.81	
8	7	Sasha Zhoya	France	16.51	
