= Santeri Kuusiniemi =

Finnish hurdler (born 1998)

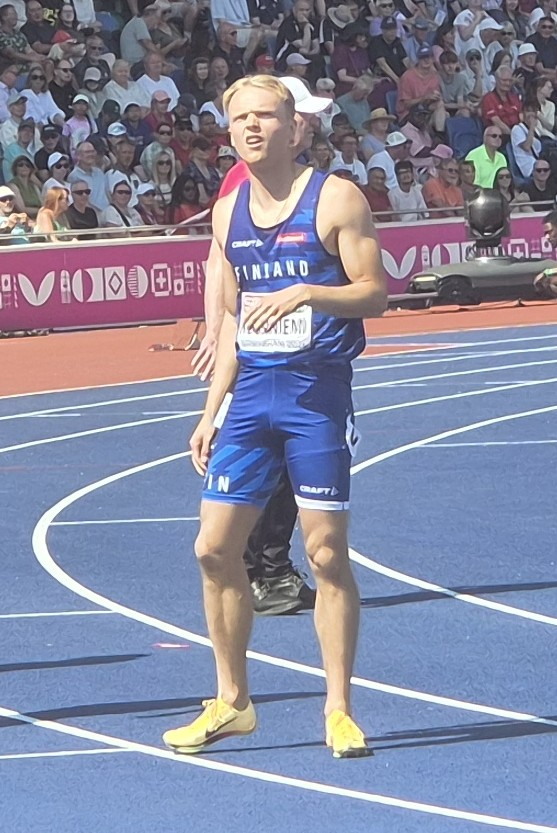

Personal information
- Born: 10 October 1998 (age 27)

Sport
- Sport: Athletics
- Events: 110 m hurdles, 60 m hurdles
- Club: Jyväskylän Kenttäurheilijat

Achievements and titles
- Personal bests: 110mH: 13.58 (Budapest, 2024); 60mH: 7.70 (Jyväskylä, 2026)

Santeri Kuusiniemi (born 10 October 1998) is a Finnish sprint hurdler. He was a finalist in the 110 metres hurdles at the 2024 European Championships, and won the 110m hurdles at the 2024 Finnish Athletics Championships.

== Biography ==
A member of Lempää Kisa Athletics as a junior athlete, he was the 100 metres and 200 metres Finnish junior champion as a teenager. At the age of 19 years-old, Kuusiniemi, ran the 60 metres hurdles in 7.6 at the Finnish Junior Championships, lower than Elmo Lakka's Finnish junior record. However, it did not count as a record due to a technical fault with the electronic timing.

Kuusiniemi later became a member of Jyväskylä Track and Field Club (JKU) in Jyväskylä. He won his first senior national title at the 2022 Finnish Indoor Athletics Championships in Kuopio, winning the 60m hurdles. He was a semi-finalist in the 110 metres hurdles at the 2022 European Athletics Championships in Munich, Germany, running 13.89 seconds in his heat, and 13.81 seconds in the semi-final.

Kuusiniemi was second to JKU club mate Elmo Lakka in the 60 metres hurdles at the 2024 Finnish Indoor Athletics Championships. Kuusiniemi placed seventh overall in the 110m hurdles at the 2024 European Athletics Championships in Rome, Italy, running 13.84 seconds. Later that month, he won the 110m hurdles title at the Finnish Athletics Championships in Vaasa, running 13.66 seconds (+0.7) in the final. The win ended the streak of streak of his teammate Elmo Lakka, who had won the previous nine Finnish Championship titles. He placed second to Elmo Lakka in the 110 metres hurdles at the 2025 Finnish Championships in Espoo.

On 1 March 2026, he was a narrow second to Elmo Lakka in the 60 metres hurdles, running 7.78 seconds at the Finnish Indoor Championships in Espoo. That month, he was selected for the Finland team to compete at the 2026 World Athletics Indoor Championships in Toruń, Poland, running 7.75 seconds. In August 2026, he ran in the men's 110 metres hurdles at the 2026 European Athletics Championships in Birmingham, England, reaching the semi-finals.
