= Craig Thorne =

Canadian hurdler

Personal information
- Born: January 3, 2001 (age 25) Miramichi, New Brunswick, Canada

Sport
- Sport: Athletics (track and field)

Achievements and titles
- Personal bests: 13.48; 110 m hurdles
Medal record
Men's Athletics
Representing Canada

Craig Thorne (born January 3, 2001) is a Canadian track and field athlete specializing in 110 metres hurdles. Thorne was born in Miramichi, New Brunswick, but his hometown is Quispamsis.

== Life and career ==
Craig Thorne was born in Miramichi, New Brunswick, on January 3, 2001, to parents Brian and Christina. Thorne's hometown is Quispamsis, where he attended the Kennebecasis Valley High School.

At the 2022 Canada Summer Games in the Niagara Region, Ontario Thorne won the gold medal in the 110 metres hurdles event for the New Brunswick team. Thorne's time of 13.83 broke the Canada Games record. His accomplishment led Thorne to be one of the province's flagbearers during the closing ceremony. In June 2024, Thorne broke the La Classique meet record in Montreal, with a time of 13.51.

In July 2024, Thorne qualified to compete for Canada at the 2024 Summer Olympics. He competed in the men's 110 metres hurdles, placing fifth in the repechage with a time of 13.42.
