= Damian Czykier =

Polish hurdler (born 1992)

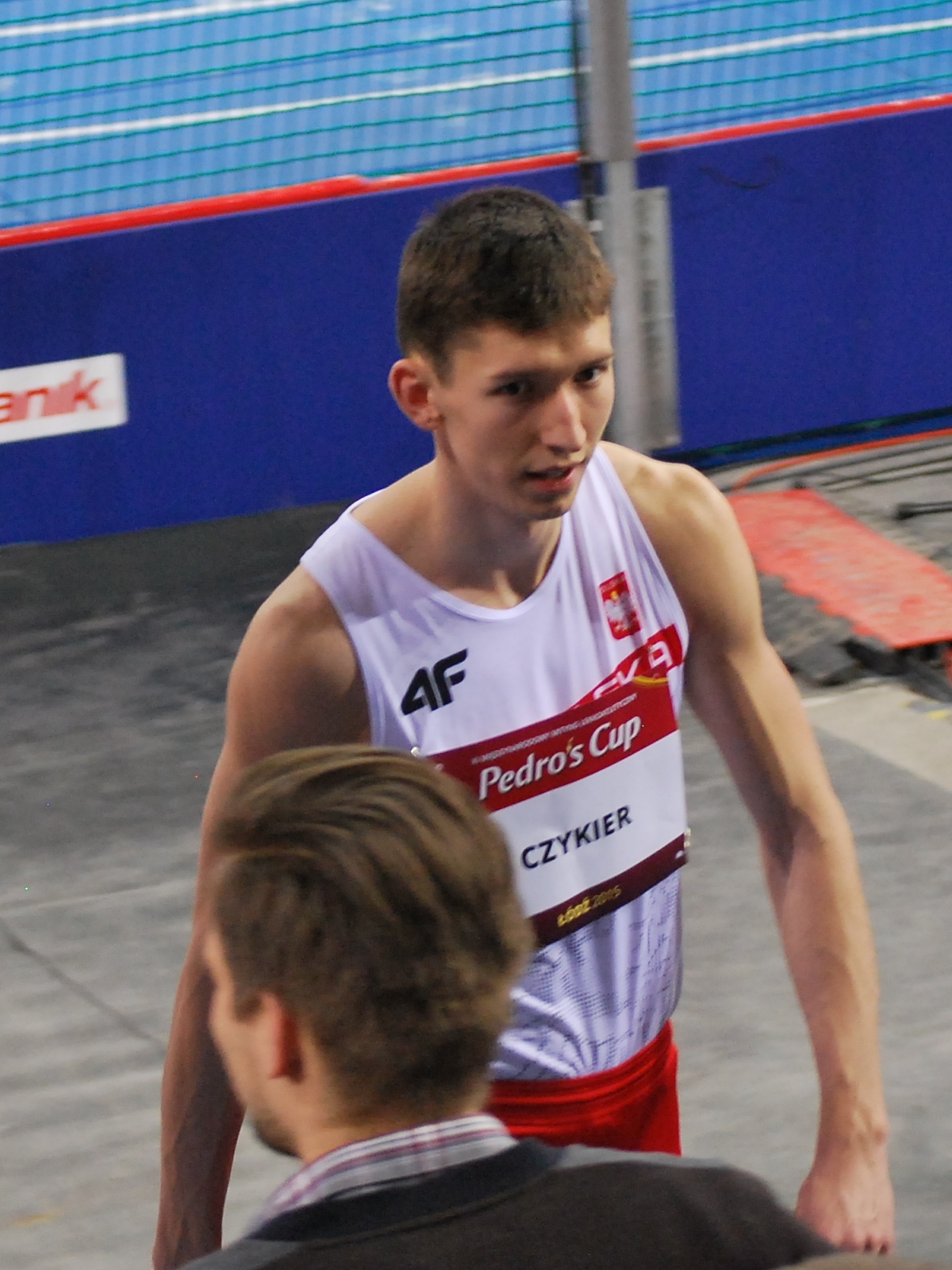
- Czykier in 2015

Personal information
- Born: 10 August 1992 (age 34) Białystok, Poland
- Education: Warsaw University of Technology
- Height: 1.86 m (6 ft 1 in)
- Weight: 73 kg (161 lb)

Sport
- Sport: Athletics
- Events: 110 m hurdles, 60 m hurdles
- Club: KS Podlasie Białystok
- Coached by: Paweł Rączka; Krzysztof Stanisławski
Medal record
Men's athletics
Representing Poland
World Relays
Silver medal – second place	2021 Chorzów	Shuttle Hurdle Relay
European Team Championships
Bronze medal – third place	2021 Chorzów	110 m hurdles
Summer Universiade
Bronze medal – third place	2017 Taipei	110 m hurdles
Polish Athletics Championships
Gold medal – first place	2012 Bielsko-Biała	4 × 100 m
Gold medal – first place	2013 Toruń	4 × 100 m
Gold medal – first place	2016 Bydgoszcz	110 m hurdles
Gold medal – first place	2016 Bydgoszcz	4 × 100 m
Gold medal – first place	2017 Białystok	110 m hurdles
Gold medal – first place	2017 Białystok	4 × 100 m
Gold medal – first place	2018 Lublin	110 m hurdles
Gold medal – first place	2019 Radom	110 m hurdles
Gold medal – first place	2020 Włocławek	110 m hurdles
Gold medal – first place	2020 Włocławek	4 × 100 m
Gold medal – first place	2021 Poznań	110 m hurdles
Gold medal – first place	2022 Suwałki	110 m hurdles
Silver medal – second place	2015 Kraków	110 m hurdles
Silver medal – second place	2015 Kraków	4 × 100 m
Bronze medal – third place	2011 Bydgoszcz	4 × 100 m
Bronze medal – third place	2011 Bydgoszcz	4 × 400 m
Bronze medal – third place	2012 Bielsko-Biała	4 × 100 m
Bronze medal – third place	2013 Toruń	4 × 100 m
Bronze medal – third place	2014 Szczecin	110 m hurdles
Bronze medal – third place	2021 Poznań	4 × 100 m
Polish Indoor Athletics Championships
Gold medal – first place	2017 Toruń	60 m hurdles
Gold medal – first place	2018 Toruń	60 m hurdles
Gold medal – first place	2019 Toruń	60 m hurdles
Gold medal – first place	2020 Toruń	60 m hurdles
Gold medal – first place	2021 Toruń	60 m hurdles
Silver medal – second place	2013 Spała	60 m hurdles
Silver medal – second place	2014 Sopot	60 m hurdles
Silver medal – second place	2015 Toruń	60 m hurdles
Silver medal – second place	2022 Toruń	60 m hurdles
Bronze medal – third place	2021 Toruń	4 × 200 m

Damian Czykier (pronounced [ˈdam.jan ˈt͡ʂɨ.kjɛr]; born 10 August 1992) is a Polish athlete specialising in the high hurdles. He came fourth at the 2015 Summer Universiade and the 2016 European Championships. Czykier also competed for Poland at the 2016, 2020, and 2024 Summer Olympics.

His personal bests are 13.28 seconds in the 110 metres hurdles (+1.2 m/s, Bydgoszcz 2017) and 7.65 seconds in the 60 metres hurdles (Belgrade 2017). Both of his parents are former athletes; father Dariusz Czykier was a footballer while mother Elżbieta Stankiewicz a basketball player.

== Competition record ==
Year	Competition	Venue	Position	Event	Notes
Representing Poland
2015	European Indoor Championships	Prague, Czech Republic	15th (sf)	60 m hurdles	7.75
2015	Universiade	Gwangju, South Korea	4th	110 m hurdles	13.72
2016	European Championships	Amsterdam, Netherlands	4th	110 m hurdles	13.40
2016	Olympic Games	Rio de Janeiro, Brazil	14th (sf)	110 m hurdles	13.50
2017	European Indoor Championships	Belgrade, Serbia	8th (h)	60 m hurdles	7.65
2017	World Championships	London, United Kingdom	14th (sf)	110 m hurdles	13.42
2017	Universiade	Taipei, Taiwan	3rd	110 m hurdles	13.56
2018	World Indoor Championships	Birmingham, United Kingdom	21st (sf)	60 m hurdles	7.78
2018	European Championships	Berlin, Germany	4th	110 m hurdles	13.38
2019	European Indoor Championships	Glasgow, United Kingdom	13th (sf)	60 m hurdles	7.77
2019	European Indoor Championships	Glasgow, United Kingdom	4th	4 × 400 m relay	3:08.40
2021	European Indoor Championships	Toruń, Poland	6th	60 m hurdles	7.63
2021	Olympic Games	Tokyo, Japan	18th (sf)	110 m hurdles	13.63
2022	World Indoor Championships	Belgrade, Serbia	15th (sf)	60 m hurdles	7.61
2022	World Championships	Eugene, United States	4th	110 m hurdles	13.32
2022	European Championships	Munich, Germany	22nd (sf)	110 m hurdles	13.99
2023	European Indoor Championships	Istanbul, Turkey	27th (h)	60 m hurdles	7.95
2023	World Championships	Budapest, Hungary	23rd (sf)	110 m hurdles	13.97
2024	European Championships	Rome, Italy	7th (sf)	110 m hurdles	13.44^{1}
2024	Olympic Games	Paris, France	15th (rep)	110 m hurdles	13.71
2025	European Indoor Championships	Apeldoorn, Netherlands	16th (h)	60 m hurdles	7.70
2025	World Championships	Tokyo, Japan	31st (h)	110 m hurdles	13.58
2026	World Indoor Championships	Toruń, Poland	11th (sf)	60 m hurdles	7.57
2026	European Championships	Birmingham, United Kingdom	16th (sf)	110 m hurdles	13.62

^{1}Did not finish in the final
