= Just Kwaou-Mathey =

French hurdler (born 1999)

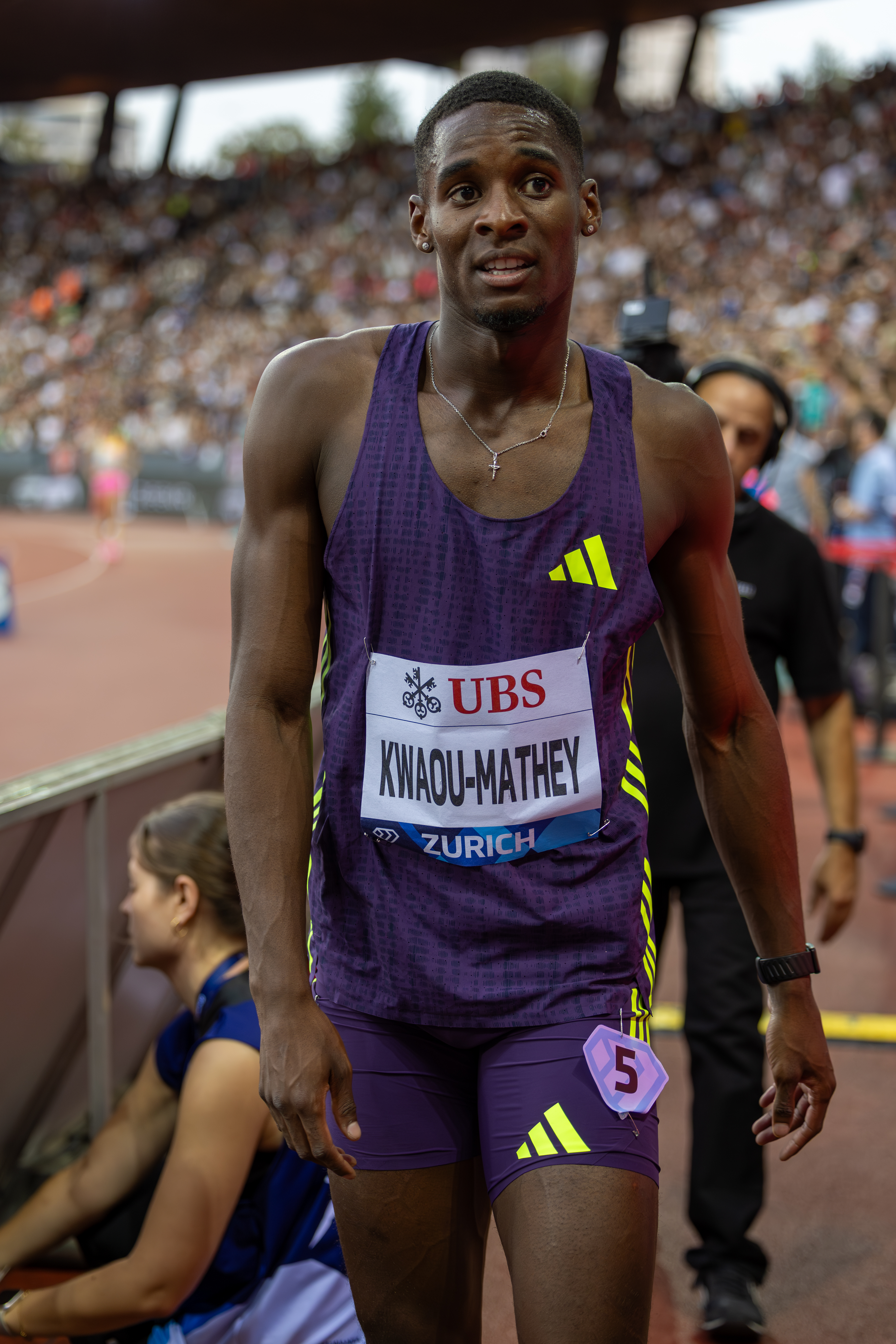
- Kwaou-Mathey at the 2026 Weltklasse Zürich

Personal information
- Born: 4 December 1999 (age 26) Paris, France
- Height: 1.89 m (6 ft 2 in)
- Weight: 73 kg (161 lb)

Sport
- Country: France
- Sport: Athletics
- Event: Hurdles

Achievements and titles
- Personal bests: 60 m hurdles: 7.43 (Lievin, 2024); 110 m hurdles: 12.99 (Talence, 2025)
Medal record
Men's athletics
Representing France
World Indoor Championships
Bronze medal – third place	2024 Glasgow	60 m hurdles
European Championships
Silver medal – second place	2026 Birmingham	110 m hurdles
Bronze medal – third place	2022 Munich	110 m hurdles
European Indoor Championships
Bronze medal – third place	2025 Apeldoorn	60 m hurdles
Bronze medal – third place	2023 Istanbul	60 m hurdles

Just Kwaou-Mathey (born 4 December 1999) is a French athlete who competes as a hurdler. He was a bronze medalist in the 110 metres hurdles at the 2022 European Athletics Championships, and in the 60 metres hurdles competing at the 2024 World Indoor Championships and the 2023 and 2025 European Indoor Championships.

== Junior career ==
The French junior 60 m champion in 2019, Kwaou-Mather finished fifth in the final of the 2021 European Athletics U23 Championships – Men's 110 metres hurdles in Tallinn, Estonia running 13.59 seconds.

== Senior career ==
=== 2022 ===
In June 2022, Kwaou-Mathey ran 13.30 in Geneva for the 110 m hurdles to achieve the entry criteria for the upcoming 2022 World Athletics Championships. A week later in Paris, he lowered his personal best to 13.27 seconds. At the World Championships he qualified from the heats and in the semi-final ran a new personal best time of 13.25 in Eugene, Oregon, but missed out on a place in the final by 0.03 seconds. He took this form into the 2022 European Athletics Championships and won the bronze medal, finishing third in the final in Munich in a time of 13.33.

=== 2023 ===
In March 2023 at the European Athletics Indoor Championships he won a bronze medal again, in the 60 m hurdles.

He competed at the 2023 World Athletics Championships, where he reached the semi-finals.

=== 2024 ===
On 10 February 2024, he set a new personal best in the 60 m hurdles indoors in Lievin of 7.43 seconds. He won a bronze medal at the 2024 World Athletics Indoor Championships in Glasgow. In April 2024, an achilles tendon injury ruled him out of the rest of the season.

=== 2025 ===
He was selected for the 2025 European Athletics Indoor Championships in Appeldoorn, where he won a bronze medal in the men's 60 metres hurdles in a time of 7.50 seconds. He finished fifth in the 2025 Diamond League event in Switzerland at the 2025 Athletissima in wet conditions in Lausanne. He was a finalist competing at the 2025 World Athletics Championships in the men's 110 metres hurdles in Tokyo, Japan, in September 2025, placing seventh overall.

=== 2026 ===
On 19 February, he finished in a dead-heat with Spaniard Enrique Llopis for shared victory in 7.446 seconds for the 60 metres hurdles competing on the World Athletics Indoor Tour in Liévin, France. He finished second in the 60 metres hurdles and third in the 60 metres sprint at the 2026 French Indoor Athletics Championships in Aubiere.

On 26 July, Kwaou-Mathey won the 110 m hurdles in 13.34 seconds at the French Championships in Albi. On 12 August, he won the silver medal at the 2026 European Athletics Championships in Birmingham, England, running a time of 13.16 seconds in the final. In September, he competed in the 110 m hurdles at the inaugural World Ultimate Championship in Budapest.

== Personal life ==
He is friends with footballer Dayot Upamecano and he was in attendance for the 2022 European Championships to see Kwaou-Mathey won a bronze medal in Munich, where Upamecano was playing club football for Bayern Munich.
