= Asier Martínez =

Spanish hurdler

- Martinez in 2026

Personal information
- Full name: Asier Martínez Echarte
- Nationality: Spanish
- Born: 22 April 2000 (age 26) Zizur Mayor, Spain

Sport
- Country: Spain
- Sport: Track and field
- Events: 60 mH, 110 mH
Medal record
Men's athletics
Representing Spain
World Championships
Bronze medal – third place	2022 Eugene	110 m hurdles
European Championships
Gold medal – first place	2022 Munich	110 m hurdles
European U23 Championships
Gold medal – first place	2021 Tallinn	110 m hurdles

Asier Martínez Echarte (Note: In this Spanish name, the first or paternal surname is Martínez and the second or maternal family name is Echarte.) (born 22 April 2000) is a Spanish hurdler. In 2022, he was a gold medalist at the European Championships and a bronze medalist at the World Championships, in the 110m hurdles. He competed at the 2020 and 2024 Olympic Games.

== Early and personal life ==
He was born in Zizur Mayor, Spain. His mother, Elena Echarte, was a competitive athlete. He won the Spanish U18 championships in the high jump before focusing on hurdling.

== Career ==
In September 2020, he became Spanish national champion in the 110 metres hurdles in Getafe. In 2021, he became the Spanish indoor champion in the 60 metres hurdles. He finished fourth in the 60 metres hurdles at the 2021 European Athletics Indoor Championships with a new personal best time of 7.60 seconds.

On 15 May 2021 in Castellón, he beat his personal best in the 110 metres hurdles with a time of 13.34s, and they won the 110 m hurdles race at the 2021 European Athletics Team Championships. He won gold at the 2021 European Athletics U23 Championships in Tallinn.

In June 2021, he booked his place at the delayed 2020 Summer Olympics by finishing second in the Spanish national championships in 13.31 seconds, meeting the qualifying standard time. At the Games in Tokyo, he qualified for the final and placed sixth overall with a new personal best time.

In July 2022, he was a bronze medalist at the 2022 World Athletics Championships in Eugene, Oregon behind Americans Grant Holloway and Trey Cunningham. He followed that with a gold medal at the 2022 European Athletics Championships in Munich.

Injury ruled him out of the 2023 season. He made his comeback into major competition at the 2024 World Athletics Indoor Championships in Glasgow. He finished in fourth place at the 2024 European Athletics Championships in Rome. He competed in the 110m hurdles at the 2024 Paris Olympics where he reached the semi-finals.

He finished fourth over 110m hurdles in May 2025 at the 2025 Doha Diamond League. He competed at the 2025 World Athletics Championships in the men's 110 metres hurdles in Tokyo, Japan, in September 2025, without advancing to the semi-finals.

In March 2026, he was a semi-finalist over 60 metres hurdles at the 2026 World Athletics Indoor Championships. On 19 June, he placed second to Cordell Tinch at the 2026 Doha Diamond League. In August 2026, he ran in the men's 110 metres hurdles at the 2026 European Athletics Championships in Birmingham, England, reaching the semi-finals.

== Personal bests ==
Outdoors

- 110 Metres Hurdles: 13.14 (Munich, 2022)

Indoors

- 60 Metres Hurdles: 7.60 (Toruń, 2021)

== International competitions ==
Year	Competition	Venue	Position	Event	Notes
Representing Spain
2019	European U20 Championships	Borås, Sweden	8th (h)	110 m hurdles (0,99m)	14.23
2021	European Indoor Championships	Toruń, Poland	4th	60 m hurdles i	7.60
2021	European U23 Championships	Tallinn, Estonia	1st	110 m hurdles	13.34
2021	Olympic Games	Tokyo, Japan	6th	110 m hurdles	13.22
2022	World Indoor Championships	Belgrade, Serbia	4th	60 m hurdles i	7.57
2022	World Championships	Eugene, United States	3rd	110 m hurdles	13.17
2022	European Championships	Munich, Germany	1st	110 m hurdles	13.14
2024	World Indoor Championships	Glasgow, United Kingdom	10th (h)	60 m hurdles i	7.62^{1}
2024	European Championships	Rome, Italy	4th	110 m hurdles	13.45
2024	Olympic Games	Paris, France	13th (sf)	110 m hurdles	13.35
2025	European Indoor Championships	Apeldoorn, Netherlands	7th	60 m hurdles i	7.68
2025	World Championships	Tokyo, Japan	32nd (h)	110 m hurdles	13.63
2026	World Indoor Championships	Toruń, Poland	14th (sf)	60 m hurdles	7.62
2026	European Championships	Birmingham, United Kingdom	10th (sf)	110 m hurdles	13.45

^{1}Disqualified in the semifinals
