= Jakub Szymański (athlete) =

Polish sprinter

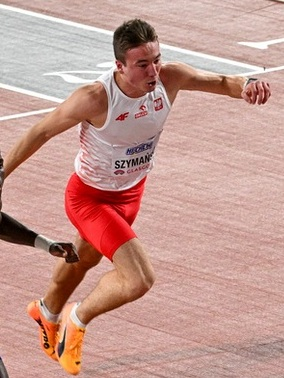
- Jakub Szymański in 2024

Personal information
- Born: 22 July 2002 (age 24)

Sport
- Sport: Athletics
- Events: 60 m hurdles, 110 m hurdles
- Club: SKLA Sopot
- Coached by: Bernard Werner; Mikołaj Justyński
Medal record
Men's athletics
Representing Poland
World Indoor Championships
Gold medal – first place	2026 Toruń	60 m hurdles
European Athletics Championships
Bronze medal – third place	2026 Birmingham	110 m hurdles
European Indoor Championships
Gold medal – first place	2025 Apeldoorn	60 m hurdles
Silver medal – second place	2023 Istanbul	60 m hurdles
World Athletics U20 Championships
Bronze medal – third place	2021 Nairobi	110 m hurdles
Polish Athletics Championships
Silver medal – second place	2022 Suwałki	110 m hurdles
Polish Indoor Athletics Championships
Gold medal – first place	2022 Toruń	60 m hurdles

Jakub Szymański (born 22 July 2002) is a Polish athlete competing in the sprint hurdles. He is a World Indoor Championships gold medallist and European Indoor Championships gold and silver medallist in the 60 metres hurdles, and a World U20 Championships bronze medallist in the 110 metres hurdles. Szymański also competed for Poland at the 2024 Summer Olympics.

His personal bests are 13.26 seconds in the 110 metres hurdles (-0.3 m/s, Birmingham 2026) and 7.37 seconds in the 60 metres hurdles (Berlin 2026), both Polish records.

== International competitions ==
Year	Competition	Venue	Position	Event	Notes
Representing Poland
2021	European U20 Championships	Tallinn, Estonia	4th	110 m hurdles (99 cm)	13.43
2021	World U20 Championships	Nairobi, Kenya	3rd	110 m hurdles (99 cm)	13.43
2022	World Indoor Championships	Belgrade, Serbia	13th (sf)	60 m hurdles	7.59
2022	European Championships	Munich, Germany	13th (sf)	110 m hurdles	13.66
2023	European Indoor Championships	Istanbul, Turkey	2nd	60 m hurdles	7.56
2023	European U23 Championships	Espoo, Finland	6th	110 m hurdles	13.65
2023	World University Games	Chengdu, China	9th (sf)	110 m hurdles	13.70
2023	World Championships	Budapest, Hungary	27th (h)	110 m hurdles	13.65
2024	World Indoor Championships	Glasgow, United Kingdom	5th	60 m hurdles	7.53
2024	European Championships	Rome, Italy	1st (h)	110 m hurdles	13.53^{1}
2024	Olympic Games	Paris, France	13th (rep)	110 m hurdles	13.63
2025	European Indoor Championships	Apeldoorn, Netherlands	1st	60 m hurdles	7.43
2025	World Indoor Championships	Nanjing, China	9th (sf)	60 m hurdles	7.63
2025	World Championships	Tokyo, Japan	35th (h)	110 m hurdles	13.74
2026	World Indoor Championships	Toruń, Poland	1st	60 m hurdles	7.40
2026	European Championships	Birmingham, United Kingdom	3rd	110 m hurdles	13.26
2026	World Ultimate Championship	Budapest, Hungary	12th (h)	110 m hurdles	13.44

^{1}Disqualified in the semifinals

Grand Slam Track results
Slam	Race group	Event	Pl.	Time	Prize money
2025 Philadelphia Slam	Short hurdles	110 m hurdles	8th	13.67	US$10,000
2025 Philadelphia Slam	Short hurdles	100 m	6th	10.93	US$10,000
