= Jason Joseph =

Swiss hurdler (born 1998)

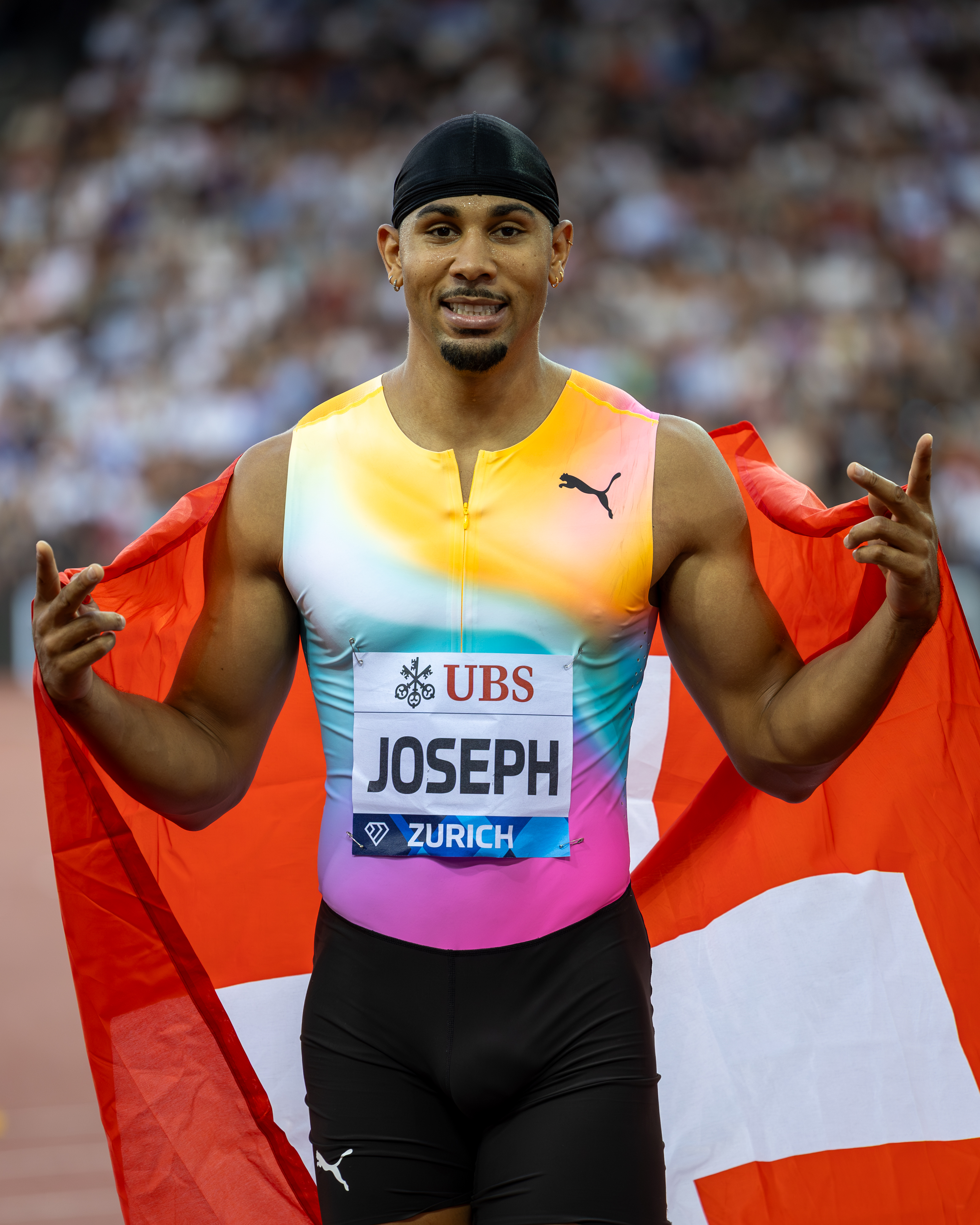
- Joseph at the 2026 Weltklasse Zürich

Personal information
- Born: 11 October 1998 (age 28) Basel, Switzerland

Sport
- Country: Switzerland
- Sport: Athletics
- Events: 110 m hurdles, 60 m hurdles
- Club: LC Therwil
- Coached by: Claudine Müller

Achievements and titles
- Personal bests: 60 m hurdles: 7.41 (Istanbul 2023) NR; 110 m hurdles: 13.08 (Zürich 2023) NR
Medal record
Representing Switzerland
European Championships
| Gold medal – first place | 2026 Birmingham | 110 m hurdles |
| Bronze medal – third place | 2024 Rome | 110 m hurdles |
European Indoor Championships
| Gold medal – first place | 2023 Istanbul | 60 m hurdles |
European Games
| Gold medal – first place | 2023 Kraków-Małopolska | 110 m hurdles |
European U23 Championships
| Gold medal – first place | 2019 Gävle | 110 m hurdles |
European U20 Championships
| Gold medal – first place | 2017 Grosseto | 110 m hurdles |

Jason Joseph (born 11 October 1998) is a Swiss athlete specialising in the sprint hurdles. He won a gold medal in the 60 metres hurdles at the 2023 European Indoor Championships. He has been the national champion in the 110 metres hurdles ever since 2019, earning the title consecutively five times in a row, and holds national records in both events. He also reached the semi-finals of the 2020 Olympics.

== Early life ==
Jason Joseph was born on 11 October 1998 in Basel, Switzerland to a Caribbean-Swiss family. His father is Saint Lucian and his mother is Swiss. Initially, he showed interest in sports such as football, breakdancing, and martial arts, as opposed to athletics. He began athletics at age 11 and it started to grow on him slowly, over the years, as time passed.

== Career ==
He represented his country at the 2018 World Indoor Championships without advancing from the first round. Earlier he won a gold medal at the 2017 European U20 Championships. Prior to 2023: His personal bests are 13.12 seconds in the 110 metres hurdles (+0.7 m/s, La Chaux-de-Fonds 2021) and 7.56 seconds in the 60 metres hurdles (St.Gallen 2019).

March 2023 he won the European Athletics Indoor Championships in 7.41 for a new PB.

On 12 August 2026, Joseph won the gold medal in the 110 metres hurdles at the European Championships in Birmingham, England.

== Achievements ==
=== International competitions ===
| Year | Competition | Venue | Position | Event | Time | Notes |
Representing Switzerland
| 2017 | European U20 Championships | Grosseto, Italy | 1st | 110 m hurdles (99.0 cm) | 13.41 | |
| 2018 | World Indoor Championships | Birmingham, United Kingdom | 30th (h) | 60 m hurdles | 7.89 | |
| 2018 | European Championships | Berlin, Germany | 12th (sf) | 110 m hurdles | 13.53 | |
| 2019 | European U23 Championships | Gävle, Sweden | 1st | 110 m hurdles | 13.45 | |
| 2019 | World Championships | Doha, Qatar | 13th (sf) | 110 m hurdles | 13.53 | |
| 2021 | Olympic Games | Tokyo, Japan | 14th (sf) | 110 m hurdles | 13.46 | |
| 2022 | World Championships | Eugene, United States | 23rd (sf) | 110 m hurdles | 13.67 | |
| 2022 | European Championships | Munich, Germany | 4th | 110 m hurdles | 13.35 | |
| 2023 | European Indoor Championships | Istanbul, Turkey | 1st | 60 m hurdles | 7.41 | EL NR |
| 2023 | 2023 European Athletics Team Championships First Division | Chorzów, Poland | 1st | 110 m hurdles | 13.12 | CR |
| 2023 | World Championships | Budapest, Hungary | 7th | 110 m hurdles | 13.28 | |
| 2024 | World Indoor Championships | Glasgow, United Kingdom | 21st (sf) | 60 m hurdles | 7.81 | |
| 2024 | European Championships | Rome, Italy | 3rd | 110 m hurdles | 13.43 | |
| 2024 | Olympic Games | Paris, France | 18th (sf) | 110 m hurdles | 13.43 | |
| 2025 | European Indoor Championships | Apeldoorn, Netherlands | 13th (sf) | 60 m hurdles | 7.70 | |
| 2025 | World Championships | Tokyo, Japan | 3rd (sf) | 110 m hurdles | 13.18^{1} | |
| 2026 | European Championships | Birmingham, United Kingdom | 1st | 110 m hurdles | 13.12 | |
| 2026 | European Championships | Birmingham, United Kingdom | 9th (h) | 4 × 100 m relay | 39.18 | |
| 2026 | World Ultimate Championship | Budapest, Hungary | 5th (h) | 110 m hurdles | 13.26^{2} | |

^{1}Did not finish in the final
^{2}Disqualified in the final

=== National titles ===
- Swiss Athletics Championships (5)
  - 110 metres hurdles: 2019, 2020, 2021, 2022, 2023
- Swiss Indoor Athletics Championships (5)
  - 60 metres hurdles: 2017, 2018, 2019, 2020, 2023

== See also ==
- List of Swiss records in athletics
- Switzerland at the Olympics
