= Štěpán Štefko =

Czech hurdler (born 2004)

Personal information
- Born: 20 March 2004 (age 22)

Sport
- Sport: Athletics
- Event: Hurdles

Achievements and titles
- Personal bests: 60mH: 7.60 (2025); 110mH: 13.65 (2025)

Štěpán Štefko (born 20 March 2004) is a Czech high hurdler.

== Biography ==
From the Hradec Králové Region, Štefko is a member of Sokol Hradec Králové. He broke the 14-second mark for the 110 metres hurdles for the first time in August 2024 with a time of 13.97 seconds to win the Czech U22 Championships in Jablonec nad Nisou.

In February 2025, he was runner-up to Jonáš Kolomazník the Czech Indoor Athletics Championships in Ostrava over 60 metres hurdles.

In June 2025, he set a new personal best of 13.87 seconds for the 110 metres hurdles at the Golden Spike event in Ostrava. That month, he represented Czechia the 2025 European Athletics Team Championships in Madrid, Spain. He was a semi-finalist in the 110 metres hurdles at the 2025 European Athletics U23 Championships in Bergen, Norway in July. In August, he was runner-up to Jonáš Kolomazník and one hundredth of a second behind his career best with a time of 13.88 seconds at the Czech Team Championships in Ostrava. That month, he was also runner-up at the Czech Athletics Championships in Jablonec nad Nisou over 110 metres hurdles.

In February 2026, he met the automatic qualifying standard for the 2026 World Indoor Championships with a run of 7.65 seconds for the 60 metres hurdles to finish runner-up to Kolomazník at the Czech Indoor Athletics Championships. In March 2026, he competed over 60 metres hurdles at the 2026 World Athletics Indoor Championships. In August 2026, he ran in the men's 110 metres hurdles at the 2026 European Athletics Championships in Birmingham, England, reaching the semi-finals.

== Personal life ==
He studies medicine at Palacký University Olomouc.
