= Elmo Lakka =

Finnish hurdler (born 1993)

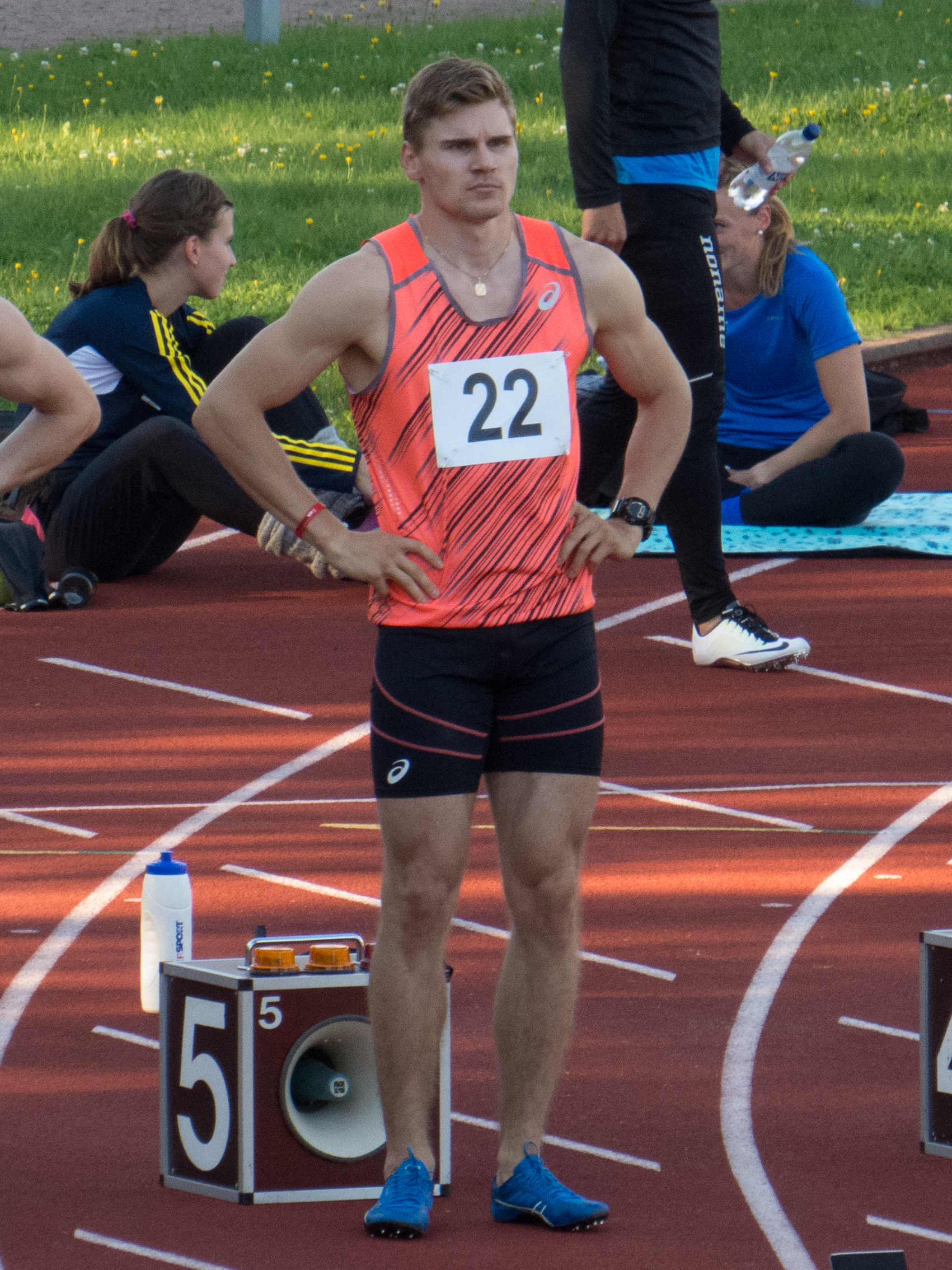
- Elmo Lakka in 2016

Personal information
- Full name: Elmo Johannes Hannunpoika Lakka
- Born: 10 April 1993 (age 33) Elimäki, Finland
- Height: 1.83 m (6 ft 0 in)
- Weight: 79 kg (174 lb)

Sport
- Sport: Athletics
- Events: 110 m hurdles, 60 m hurdles
- Club: Jyväskylän Kenttäurheilijat
- Coached by: Antti Haapakoski

Elmo Johannes Hannunpoika Lakka (born 10 April 1993 in Elimäki) is a Finnish athlete specialising in the high hurdles. He represented his country at two outdoor and one indoor European Championships without qualifying for the final.

His personal bests are 13.59 seconds in the 110 metres hurdles (+1.2 m/s, Kuortane 2019) and 7.67 seconds in the 60 metres hurdles (Kuopio 2019).

On 2 June 2021, he ran 13.31 (-0.3) at Harjun stadion, in Jyväskylä, beating the National record.

== International competitions ==
Year	Competition	Venue	Position	Event	Notes
Representing Finland
2011	European Junior Championships	Tallinn, Estonia	18th (sf)	110 m hurdles (99 cm)	14.44
2012	World Junior Championships	Barcelona, Spain	12th (sf)	110 m hurdles (99 cm)	13.74
2015	European U23 Championships	Tallinn, Estonia	6th	110 m hurdles	14.03
2015	European U23 Championships	Tallinn, Estonia	–	4 × 100 m relay	DNF
2016	European Championships	Amsterdam, Netherlands	21st (sf)	110 m hurdles	13.87
2017	European Indoor Championships	Belgrade, Serbia	14th (h)	60 m hurdles	7.78
2018	European Championships	Berlin, Germany	17th (sf)	110 m hurdles	13.60
2019	European Indoor Championships	Glasgow, United Kingdom	8th	60 m hurdles	7.74
2019	World Championships	Doha, Qatar	28th (h)	110 m hurdles	13.73
2021	European Indoor Championships	Toruń, Poland	9th (sf)	60 m hurdles	7.71
2021	Olympic Games	Tokyo, Japan	20th (sf)	110 m hurdles	13.67
2022	World Championships	Eugene, United States	35th (h)	110 m hurdles	13.91
2022	European Championships	Munich, Germany	9th (h)	110 m hurdles	13.78
2023	European Indoor Championships	Istanbul, Turkey	14th (sf)	60 m hurdles	7.83
2023	World Championships	Budapest, Hungary	31st (h)	110 m hurdles	13.69
2024	World Indoor Championships	Glasgow, United Kingdom	19th (sf)	60 m hurdles	7.70
2024	European Championships	Rome, Italy	22nd (h)	110 m hurdles	14.10
2024	Olympic Games	Paris, France	17th (rep)	110 m hurdles	13.75
2025	European Indoor Championships	Apeldoorn, Netherlands	15th (sf)	60 m hurdles	7.81
2026	World Indoor Championships	Toruń, Poland	22nd (sf)	60 m hurdles	7.74
2026	European Championships	Birmingham, United Kingdom	19th (sf)	110 m hurdles	13.89
