= Michael Obasuyi =

Belgian hurdler

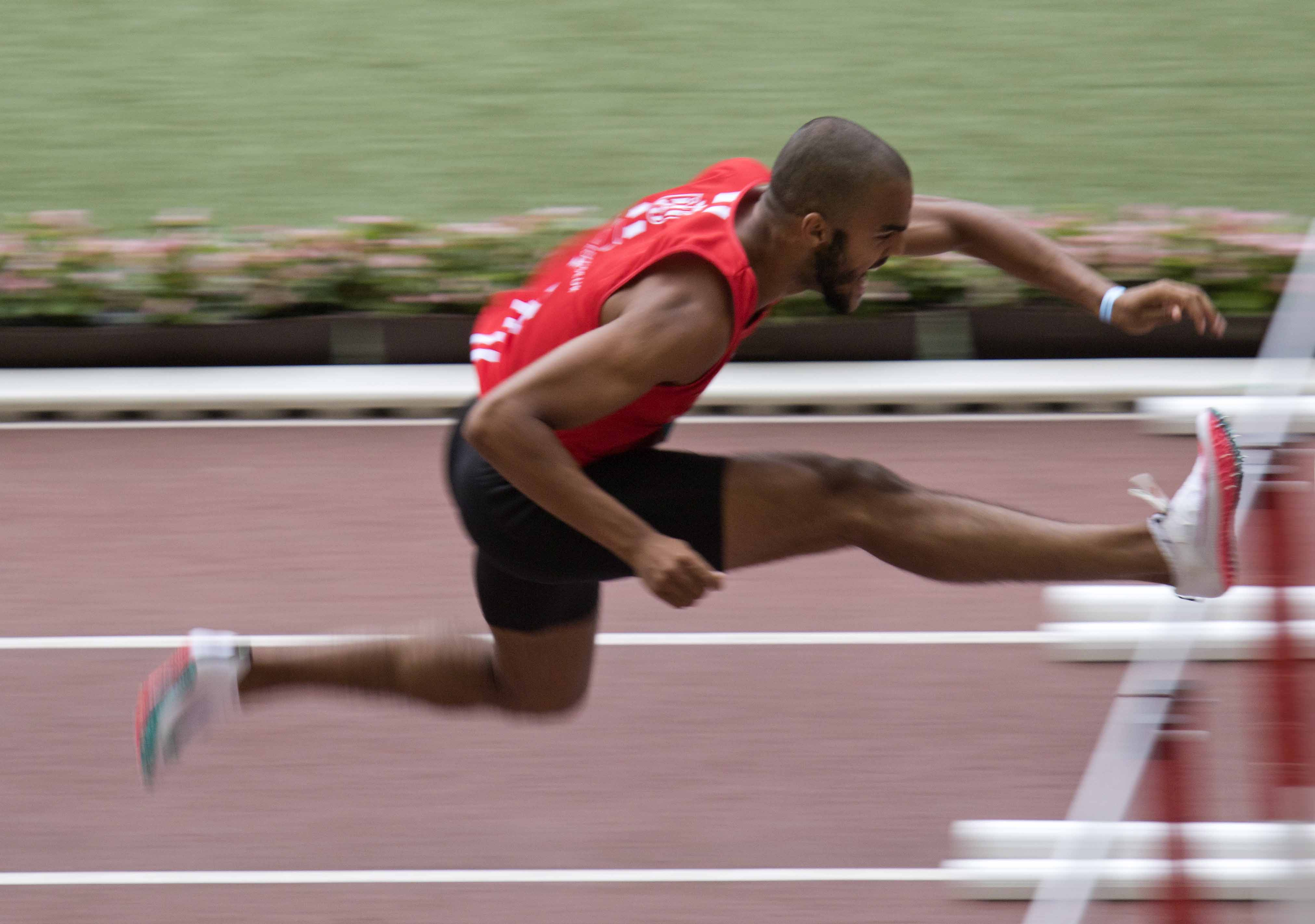
- Obasuyi in 2020

Personal information
- Nationality: Belgium
- Born: 12 August 1999 (age 26) Bruges, belgium
- Height: 1.89 m (6 ft 2 in)

Sport
- Sport: Athletics

Michael Obasuyi (born 12 August 1999) is a Belgian hurdler. He competed in the 2020 and 2024 Summer Olympics He was born to a Nigerian father and Belgian mother both of whom sprinted in their youth. In November 2024 he testified in the De Standaard newspaper about his lifelong struggle with autism.

On 28 June 2026, he lowered his 110m hurdle national record to 13.10 at the Paris Diamond League meeting.

== Statistics ==
=== Circuit performances ===
Grand Slam Track results
Slam	Race group	Event	Pl.	Time	Prize money
2025 Miami Slam	Short hurdles	110 m hurdles	7th	13.41	US$12,500
2025 Miami Slam	Short hurdles	100 m	6th	10.67	US$12,500

=== International competitions ===
Year	Competition	Venue	Position	Event	Notes
Representing Belgium
2015	European Youth Olympic Festival	Tbilisi, Georgia	–	110 m hurdles (91.4 cm)	DQ
2015	European Youth Olympic Festival	Tbilisi, Georgia	9th	Long jump	6.66 m
2016	European Youth Championships	Tbilisi, Georgia	7th	Long jump	7.16 m
2017	European U20 Championships	Grosseto, Italy	15th (sf)	110 m hurdles (99 cm)	14.17
2018	World U20 Championships	Tampere, Finland	4th	110 m hurdles (99 cm)	13.45
2018	European Championships	Berlin, Germany	23rd (sf)	110 m hurdles	13.78
2019	European U23 Championships	Gävle, Sweden	5th	110 m hurdles	13.67
2021	European U23 Championships	Tallinn, Estonia	2nd	110 m hurdles	13.40
2021	Olympic Games	Tokyo, Japan	29th (h)	110 m hurdles	13.65
2022	World Indoor Championships	Belgrade, Serbia	10th (sf)	60 m hurdles	7.58
2022	European Championships	Munich, Germany	17th (h)	110 m hurdles	13.90
2024	World Indoor Championships	Glasgow, United Kingdom	7th	60 m hurdles	7.55
2024	European Championships	Rome, Italy	6th	110 m hurdles	13.46
2024	Olympic Games	Paris, France	12th (h)	110 m hurdles	13.41
2024	Olympic Games	Paris, France	14th (sf)	110 m hurdles	13.36
2025	European Indoor Championships	Apeldoorn, Netherlands	6th	60 m hurdles	7.63
2025	World Indoor Championships	Nanjing, China	5th	60 m hurdles	7.60
2025	World Championships	Tokyo, Japan	26th (h)	110 m hurdles	13.54
2026	World Indoor Championships	Toruń, Poland	15th (sf)	60 m hurdles	7.62

^{1}Disqualified in the final
