= Jonáš Kolomazník =

Czech hurdler (born 2003)

Personal information
- Born: 24 February 2003 (age 23)

Sport
- Sport: Athletics
- Event: Hurdles

Achievements and titles
- Personal bests: 60m hurdles: 7.61 (2026); 110m hurdles: 13.56 (2025)

Jonáš Kolomazník (born 24 February 2003) is a Czech sprint hurdler. He has won national titles over 110 metres hurdles, and indoors over 60 metres hurdles.

== Biography ==
Initially a multi-event athlete Kolomazník was hampered by injuries and came back to athletics focusing on the hurdles. He won consecutive bronze medals at the Czech Athletics Championships in 2023 and 2024 over 110 metres hurdles, as well as placing third at the 2024 Czech Indoor Athletics Championships in the 60 metres hurdles.

In February 2025, he won the 2025 Czech Indoor Athletics Championships in Ostrava over 60 metres hurdles in 7.64 seconds. The time, achieved despite a muscle injury, was a personal best and also equalled the national under-23 record set 40 years earlier by Jiří Hudec. He was selected for his major international debut at the 2025 World Athletics Indoor Championships in Nanjing, China.

Kolomazník was a semi-finalist in the 110 metres hurdles at the 2025 European Athletics U23 Championships in Bergen, Norway. In August 2025, he set a new personal best 13.63 seconds at the Czech Team Championships in Ostrava. That month, he won the Czech Athletics Championships in Jablonec nad Nisou over 110 metres hurdles, in 13.69 seconds in the final but lowering his personal best to 13.56 in the heats.

In February 2026, Kolomazník improved his personal best to 7.62 seconds in the 60 metres hurdles in the semi-final at the Czech Indoor Gala in Ostrava. He was two hundredths slower in the final and finished fifth overall. His times met the automatic qualifying standard for the 2026 World Indoor Championships. On 28 February, he ran 7.62 seconds for the 60 metres hurdles to win ahead of Štěpán Štefko at the 2026 Czech Indoor Athletics Championships. In March 2026, he was a semi-finalist over 60 metres hurdles at the 2026 World Athletics Indoor Championships, running a personal best of 7.61 seconds. In August 2026, he ran in the men's 110 metres hurdles at the 2026 European Athletics Championships in Birmingham, England, reaching the semi-finals.
