= Gregory Minoué =

German athlete (born 2002)

Personal information
- Nationality: German
- Born: 13 March 2002 (age 24)

Sport
- Sport: Athletics
- Event: Hurdles

Achievements and titles
- Personal best(s): 60 m hurdles: 7.60s (Dortmund, 2025); 110 m hurdles: 13.46s (Dresden, 2025)

Gregory Minoué (born 13 March 2002) is a German hurdler. He won the German Athletics Championships in 2025 in the 110 metres hurdles.

== Career ==
He is from Düsseldorf, and has competed as a member of local clubs TV Angermund and TV Kalkum-Wittlaer. He spent ten years training under Antje Kirberg before later moving to Leipzig to join the training group of national coach Alexander John.

Initially a multi-events, in 2020 he was victorious at the German U20 Indoor Championships in Neubrandenburg, running the 60 metres hurdles in 7.83 seconds in his first full season competing as a hurdler. Later that year he won the 2020 German U20 Championships in the 110 metres hurdles.

He competed for Germany at the 2021 European Athletics U20 Championships in Tallinn, Estonia where he set a personal best in the 110 metres hurdles of 13.52 seconds, ultimately finishing in fifth place overall. Later that year he retained his title at the 2021 German U20 Championships in Rostock in the 110 m hurdles, with a time of 13.60 seconds.

He finished third at the senior 2022 German Indoor Athletics Championships in the 60 metres hurdles in Leipzig. He finished third at the 2023 German Indoor Athletics Championships in the 60 metres hurdles in Dortmund. He also finished third at the 2023 German Athletics Championships in the 110 metres hurdles in Kassel. He was a semi-finalist at the 2023 European Athletics U23 Championshipsin Espoo, Finland.

In February 2025 in Düsselforf, he set a personal best time of 7.66 seconds for the 60 m hurdles. He was runner-up at the German Indoor Athletics Championships over 60 metres hurdles in Dortmund later that month, with a new personal best time of 7.60 seconds. He competed at the 2025 European Athletics Indoor Championships in Apeldoorn, Netherlands, in the 60 metres hurdles, but did not progress past the semi-finals, where he ran 7.68 seconds.

He won the 110 metres hurdles title at the German Athletics Championships in August 2025 in Dresden, running 13.48 seconds to finish ahead of Manuel Mordi. He was a semi-finalist competing at the 2025 World Athletics Championships in the men's 110 metres hurdles in Tokyo, Japan, in September 2025.
