= Enrique Llopis =

Spanish hurdler (born 2000)

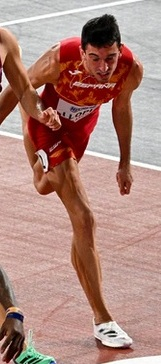
- Enrique Llopis in 2024

Personal information
- Full name: Enrique Llopis Doménech
- Born: 15 October 2000 (age 25) Bellreguard, Spain

Sport
- Country: Spain
- Sport: Track and field
- Events: 60 mH, 110 mH
Medal record
Men's athletics
Representing Spain
World Indoor Championships
Silver medal – second place	2026 Toruń	60 m hurdles
European Championships
Silver medal – second place	2024 Rome	110 m hurdles
European Games
Bronze medal – third place	2023 Kraków-Małopolska	110 m hurdles

Enrique Llopis Doménech (Note: In this Spanish name, the first or paternal surname is Llopis and the second or maternal family name is Doménech.) (born 15 October 2000) is a Spanish athlete who specializes in the 110m hurdles.

== Personal bests ==
Outdoors

- 110 metres hurdles: 13.12 (Zurich, 2025)

Indoors

- 60 metres hurdles: 7.42 NR (Toruń, 2026)

== International competitions ==
Representing Spain
Year	Competition	Venue	Position	Event	Result
2017	World U18 Championships	Nairobi, Kenya	4th	110 m hurdles (0,91m)	13.58
2018	World U20 Championships	Tampere, Finland	–	110 m hurdles (0,99m)	DNF in final
2019	European Indoor Championships	Glasgow, United Kingdom	14th (s)	60 m hurdles	7.87
2019	European U20 Championships	Borås, Sweden	4th	110 m hurdles (0,99m)	13.66
2021	European Indoor Championships	Toruń, Poland	13th (s)	60 m hurdles	7.74
2021	European U23 Championships	Tallinn, Estonia	3rd	110 m hurdles	13.44
2022	World Indoor Championships	Belgrade, Serbia	30th (h)	60 m hurdles	7.76
2022	Mediterranean Games	Oran, Algeria	3rd	110 m hurdles	13.47
2022	World Championships	Eugene, United States	16th (s)	110 m hurdles	13.44
2022	European Championships	Munich, Germany	7th	110 m hurdles	14.81
2023	European Games	Chorzów, Poland	3rd	110 m hurdles	13.44
2023	World Championships	Budapest, Hungary	9th (sf)	110 m hurdles	13.30
2024	World Indoor Championships	Glasgow, United Kingdom	4th	60 m hurdles	7.53
2024	European Championships	Rome, Italy	2nd	110 m hurdles	13.16
2024	Olympic Games	Paris, France	4th	110 m hurdles	13.20
2025	European Indoor Championships	Apeldoorn, Netherlands	2nd (sf)	60 m hurdles i	7.49^{2}
2025	World Championships	Tokyo, Japan	4th	110 m hurdles	13.16
2026	World Indoor Championships	Toruń, Poland	2nd	60 m hurdles	7.42
2026	European Championships	Birmingham, United Kingdom	11th (sf)	110 m hurdles	13.47
2026	World Ultimate Championship	Budapest, Hungary	11th (h)	110 m hurdles	13.37

^{2}Did not start in the final
