= Dániel Eszes =

Hungarian hurdler (born 1999

Personal information
- Born: 1 July 1999 (age 27)

Sport
- Sport: Athletics
- Event: Hurdles

Achievements and titles
- Personal bests: 60mH: 7.76 (Nyíregyháza, 2025); 100mH: 13.56 (Budapest, 2022)
Medal record
Men's athletics
Representing Hungary
European 18 Championships
Gold medal – first place	2016 Tbilisi	110 m hurdles

Dániel Eszes (born 1 July 1999) is a Hungarian sprint hurdler. He won the gold medal in the 110 metres hurdles at the 2018 European Athletics U18 Championships, and has won senior Hungarian national titles in the 110 metres hurdles and the 60 metres hurdles.

== Biography ==
Eszes started with martial arts, and was practising karate by the time he was four years-old. He started in athletics at the age of nine years-old and was initially a multiple-event athlete, before focusing on hurdles in 2015.

A member of Városi Sportegyesület Dunakeszi (VSD) in Dunakeszi, Eszes was the best in his age group in 2016, and subsequently won the gold medal in the 110 metres hurdles at the 2018 European Athletics U18 Championships in Tbilisi, Georgia. Alongside his athletics, he also studied at the Hungarian University of Physical Education and Sport Sciences.

After a prolonged spell on the sidelines with illness such as appendicitis and peritonitis, Eszes represented Hungary un the 60 metres hurdles at the 2023 European Athletics Indoor Championships in Istanbul, running 8.03 seconds without advancing to the semi-final. The following year, he competed in the 110 metres hurdles at the 2024 European Athletics Championships in Rome, Italy.

Eszes won the 60 metres hurdles at the 2025 Hungarian Indoor Athletics Championships in Nyíregyháza in February 2025, running a personal best 7.76 seconds. That summer, Eszes also won the 110 metres hurdles at the 2025 Hungarian Athletics Championships.

Eszes retained his title in the 60 metres hurdles at the 2026 Hungarian Indoor Championships in Nyíregyháza with a time of 7.86 seconds in the final. He ran 7.83 seconds to win the ÖLV-Hallenmeeting in Vienna the following week.

In March 2026, he competed over 60 metres hurdles at the 2026 World Athletics Indoor Championships. In August 2026, he ran in the men's 110 metres hurdles at the 2026 European Athletics Championships in Birmingham, England.
