= Nicolo' Giacalone =

Italian athlete (born 1997)

Personal information
- Nationality: Italian
- Born: 24 December 1997 (age 28)

Sport
- Sport: Athletics
- Event: Hurdles

Achievements and titles
- Personal best(s): 60m hurdles: 7.75s (Apeldoorn, 2025); 100m hurdles: 13.71s (Graz, 2024)

Nicolo' Giacalone (born 24 December 1997) is an Italian sprint hurdler. He won the Italian Indoor Athletics Championships in 2025 over 60 metres hurdles and represented Italy at the 2025 World Athletics Indoor Championships.

== Career ==
He won the 60 metres hurdles title at the Italian Indoor Athletics Championships in February 2025 in Ancona, with a time of 7.82 seconds. He was selected for the 2025 European Athletics Indoor Championships in Apeldoorn, where he ran a personal best time of 7.75 seconds. He was selected for the 2025 World Athletics Indoor Championships in Nanjing in March 2025.

He placed third over 100 metres hurdles at the Italian Athletics Championships in August 2025.
