= Wilhem Belocian =

French hurdler and sprinter

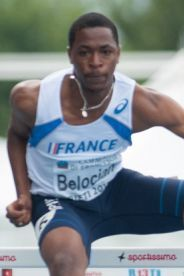
- Belocian in 2013

Personal information
- Nationality: French
- Born: 25 June 1995 (age 31) Les Abymes, Guadeloupe

Sport
- Sport: Running
- Event: 110 metre hurdles

Achievements and titles
- Personal best: 110 m H: 13.07 s (La Chaux-de-Fonds 2023)
Medal record
Men's athletics
Representing France
World Indoor Championships
Silver medal – second place	2025 Nanjing	60 m hurdles
European Championships
Bronze medal – third place	2016 Amsterdam	110 m hurdles
European Indoor Championships
Gold medal – first place	2021 Toruń	60 m hurdles
Silver medal – second place	2025 Apeldoorn	60 m hurdles
Bronze medal – third place	2015 Prague	60 m hurdles
World Junior Championships
Gold medal – first place	2014 Oregon	110 m hurdles
Bronze medal – third place	2012 Barcelona	110 m hurdles
World Youth Championships
Bronze medal – third place	2011 Lille	110 m hurdles
Bronze medal – third place	2011 Lille	Medley relay
European Junior Championships
Gold medal – first place	2013 Rieti	110 m hurdles
European Youth Olympic Festival
Gold medal – first place	2011 Trabzon	4 × 100 m relay
Silver medal – second place	2011 Trabzon	110 m hurdles
Representing Guadeloupe
CARIFTA Games (Junior)
Gold medal – first place	2012 Hamilton	110 m hurdles
Gold medal – first place	2013 Nassau	110 m hurdles
Gold medal – first place	2014 Fort-de-France	110 m hurdles
CARIFTA Games (Youth)
Gold medal – first place	2011 Montego Bay	110 m hurdles

Wilhem Belocian (born 25 June 1995) is a French hurdler and sprinter from Guadeloupe.

== Career ==
Belocian won the 110 metre hurdles bronze medal at the 2011 World Youth Championships in Athletics, in a personal best of 13.51 seconds. He won the 110 metre hurdles gold medal at the 2014 World Junior Championships in a world junior record time of 12.99 seconds. Belocian withdrew from the 2015 World Championships in Athletics because of a thigh injury sustained in mid July 2015. Belocian was disqualified due to a false start in the 2016 Summer Olympics.

== Personal life ==
Belocian is the older brother of the professional footballer Jeanuël Belocian.

== Statistics ==
Grand Slam Track results
Slam	Race group	Event	Pl.	Time	Prize money
2025 Miami Slam	Short hurdles	110 m hurdles	8th	13.47	US$10,000
2025 Miami Slam	Short hurdles	100 m		DNS	US$10,000

Records
Preceded by (United States) Wayne Davis	Men's World Junior Record Holder, 110 metres hurdles 24 July 2014 – 21 August 2021	Succeeded by (France) Sasha Zhoya
Preceded by (United States) Wayne Davis	Boys' World Youth Best Holder, 110 metres hurdles 21 July 2012 – 23 August 2014	Succeeded by (Jamaica) Jaheel Hyde (France) Sasha Zhoya
