= Lorenzo Simonelli (athlete) =

Italian hurdler

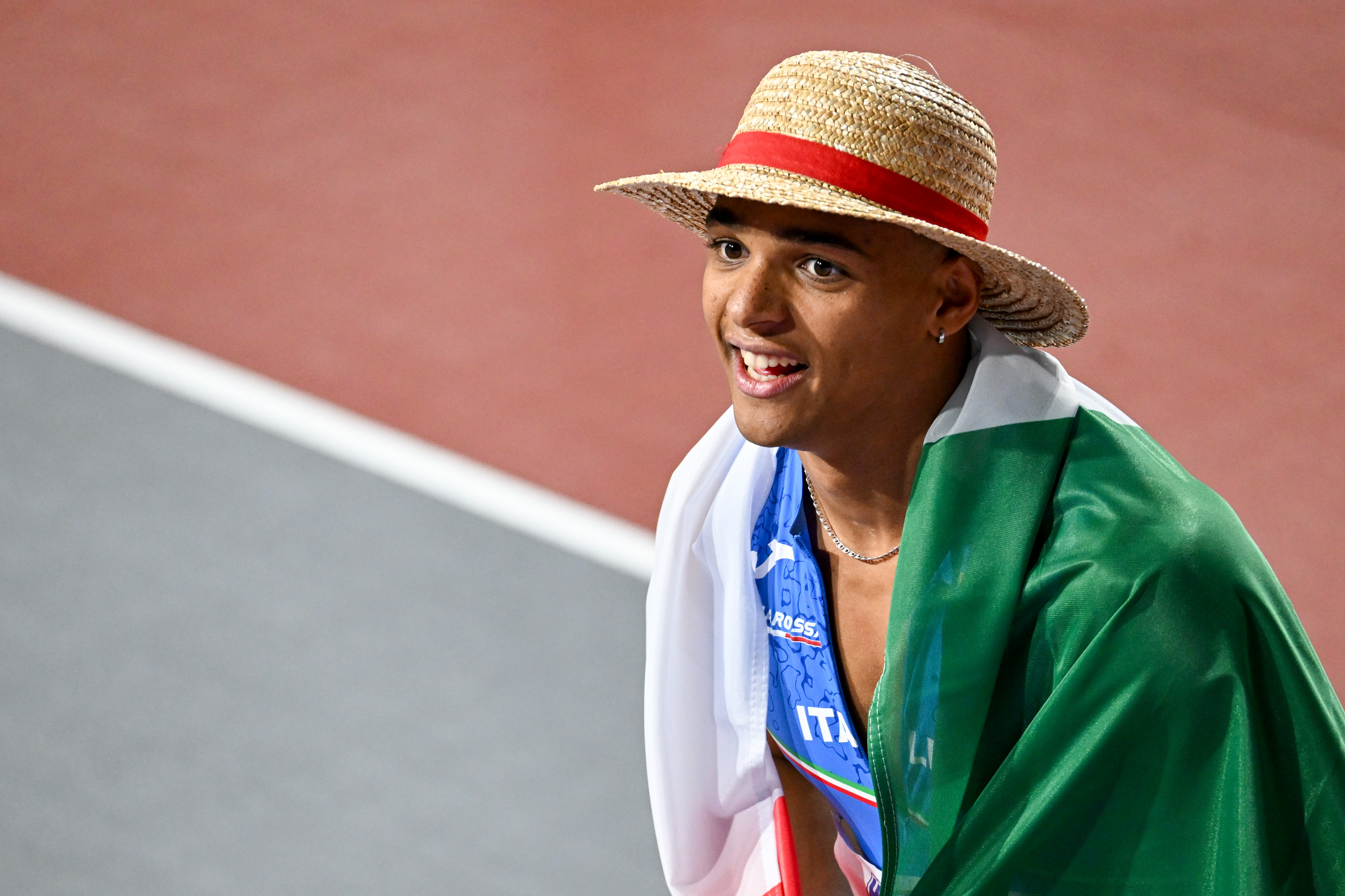
- Simonelli at Glasgow 2024

Personal information
- Full name: Lorenzo Ndele Simonelli
- National team: Italy: 3 caps (2022-)
- Born: 1 June 2002 (age 24) Dodoma, Tanzania
- Height: 1.88 m (6 ft 2 in)
- Weight: 77 kg (170 lb)

Sport
- Sport: Athletics
- Event: Hurdling
- Club: G.S. Esercito
- Coached by: Giorgio Frinolli

Achievements and titles
- Personal bests: 60 m hs: 7.43 (2024); 110 m hs: 13.05 (2024)
Medal record
Men's athletics
Representing Italy
World Indoor Championships
Silver medal – second place	2024 Glasgow	60 m hurdles
European Championships
Gold medal – first place	2024 Rome	110 m hurdles
Gold medal – first place	2024 Rome	4 × 100 m relay
European U23 Championships
Silver medal – second place	2023 Espoo	110 m hurdles
European U20 Championships
Bronze medal – third place	2021 Tallinn	110 m hurdles

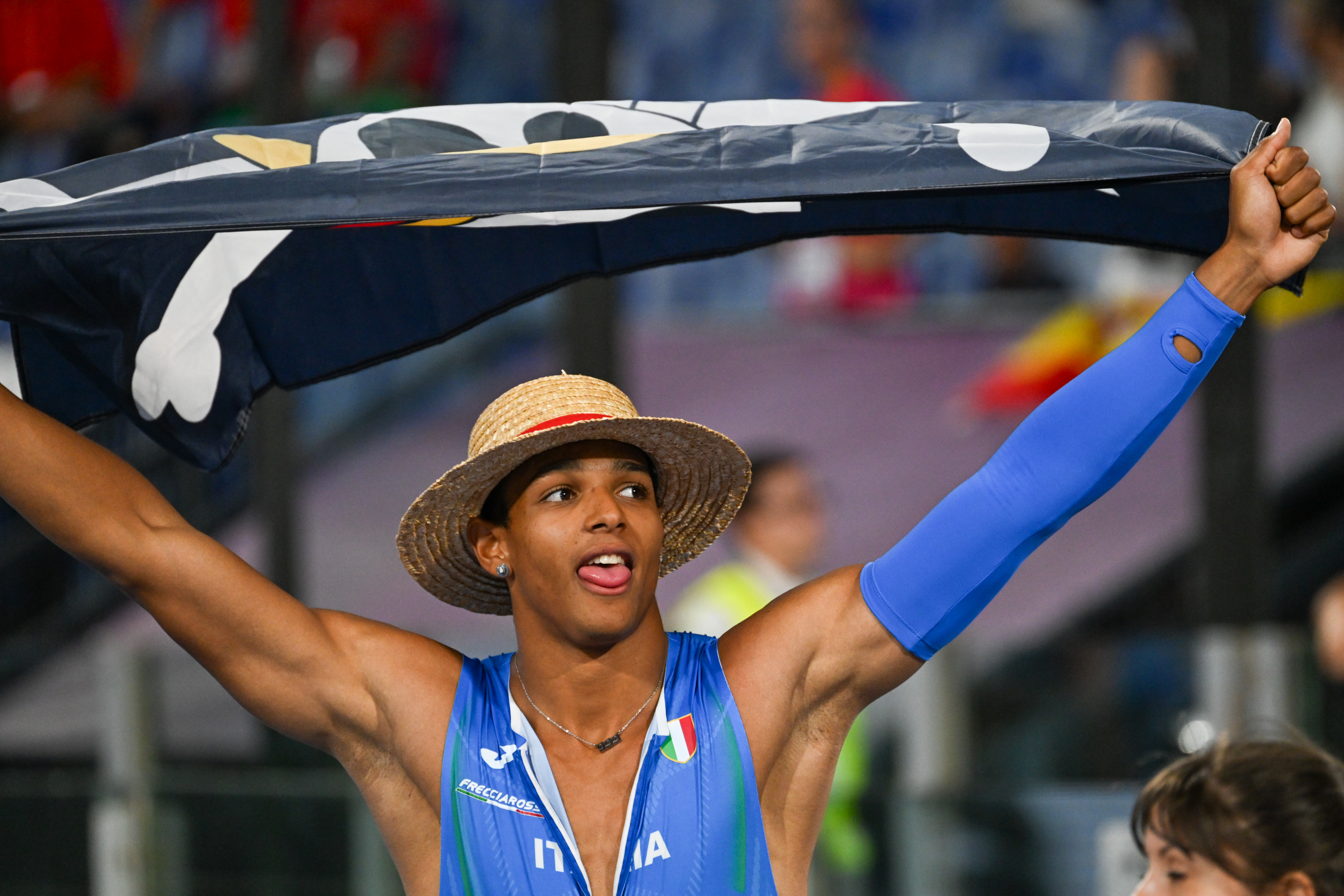
Lorenzo celebrates the victory in Roma 2024 by wearing his celebratory straw hat of Monkey D. Luffy from the anime One Piece.

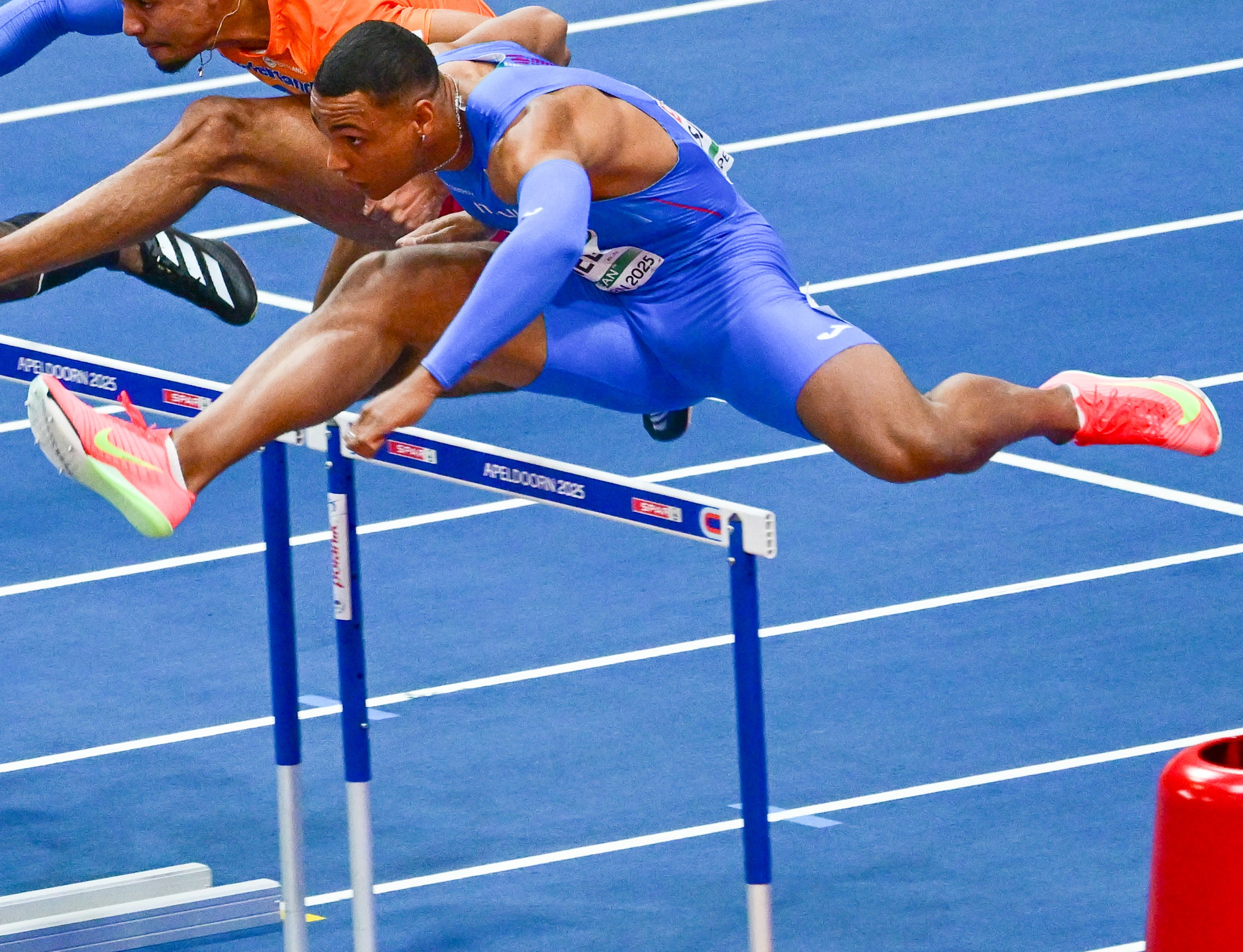
Lorenzo Simonelli at Apeldoorn 2025.

Lorenzo Ndele Simonelli (born 1 June 2002) is a Tanzanian-born Italian hurdler European champion in Roma 2024 and vice Indoor World champion at Glasgow 2024 in 60 m hs.

== Biography ==
Born in Dodoma, Tanzania to an Italian father (anthropologist and researcher) and a Tanzanian mother, he moved with his family to Rome at the age of 5.

== Career ==
At the indoor Europeans in Istanbul 2023, credited at the same time as the hundredth of the third place, after the photo-finish check he missed the bronze medal by 5 thousandths of a second.

== National records ==
- 110 metres hurdles: 13.05 ( (Italy) Rome, 8 June 2024) - current holder

== Achievements ==
Year	Competition	Venue	Rank	Event	Time	Notes
2022	Mediterranean Games	(Algeria) Oran	5th	110 m hs	13.59	PB
2022	European Championships	(Germany) Munchen	Heats	110 m hs	13.95	
2023	European Indoor Championships	(Turkey) Istanbul	4th	60 m hs	7.59	PB
2023	European U23 Championships	(Finland) Espoo	2nd	110 m hs	13.36	PB (Note: He ran 13.33 his PB in semifinals)
2024	World indoor Championships	(United Kingdom) Glasgow	2nd	60 m hs	7.43	NR
2024	European Championships	(Italy) Rome	1st	110 m hs	13.05	NR
2025	European Indoor Championships	(Netherlands) Apeldoorn	Semifinals	60 m hs	7.60	
2025	World indoor Championships	(China) Nanjing	4th	60 m hs	7.60	(Note: He ran 7.55 in semifinal)
2026	World indoor Championships	(Poland) Torun	8th	60 m hs	7.52	

Grand Slam Track results
Slam	Race group	Event	Pl.	Time	Prize money
2025 Philadelphia Slam	Short hurdles	110 m hurdles	5th	13.55	US$25,000
2025 Philadelphia Slam	Short hurdles	100 m	3rd	10.52	US$25,000

== National titles ==
Simonelli has won five national championships at individual senior level

- Italian Athletics Championships
  - 110 m hs: 2023, 2024, 2025
- Italian Athletics Indoor Championships
  - 60 m hs: 2023, 2024

== See also ==
- Italian records in athletics
- Italian all-time lists - 110 metres hurdles
