= 2024 World Athletics U20 Championships – Men's 110 metres hurdles =

Men's 110 metres hurdles at the 2024 World Athletics U20 Championships
- Venue: Estadio Atlético de la VIDENA
- Dates: 29 August 2024 (heats & semi-finals); 30 August 2024 (final)
- Competitors: 69 from 50 nations
- Winning time: 13.05

Medalists
gold medal	Ja'Kobe Tharp	United States
silver medal	Andre Korbmacher	United States
bronze medal	Chen Yuanjiang	China

The men's 110 metres hurdles at the 2024 World Athletics U20 Championships was held at the Estadio Atlético de la VIDENA in Lima, Peru on 29 and 30 August 2024.

== Records ==
U20 standing records prior to the 2024 World Athletics U20 Championships were as follows:

Record	Athlete & Nationality	Mark	Location	Date
World U20 Record	Sasha Zhoya (FRA)	12.72	Nairobi, Kenya	21 August 2021
Championship Record	Sasha Zhoya (FRA)	12.72	Nairobi, Kenya	21 August 2021
World U20 Leading	Ja'Kobe Tharp (USA)	13.12	Eugene, United States	13 June 2024

== Results ==
=== Heats ===
The first 2 athletes in each heat (Q) and the next 8 fastest (q) qualified to the semi-finals.

==== Heat 1 ====
Rank	Lane	Athlete	Nation	Time	Notes
1	5	Andre Korbmacher	United States	13.40	Q
2	9	Vinícius de Brito	Brazil	13.68	Q
3	3	Bojan Novaković	Serbia	13.69	q, NU20R
4	7	Daniel Beckford	Jamaica	13.74	q
5	8	Muhammad Mohd Faizal	Malaysia	13.97	
6	4	Ángel López	Mexico	13.99	PB
7	2	Yu Hashimoto	Japan	14.02	
8	6	Philipp Pichler	Austria	14.41	
				Wind: -0.7 m/s	

==== Heat 2 ====
Rank	Lane	Athlete	Nation	Time	Notes
1	9	Ja'Kobe Tharp	United States	13.23	Q
2	3	Matteo Togni	Italy	13.68	Q
3	7	Werner Bezuidenhout	South Africa	13.95	
4	4	Gerónimo Canizales	Colombia	14.09	
5	5	Bogdan Goncharov	Kazakhstan	14.19	
6	6	Lucas Fun Le Cong	Singapore	14.30	
7	2	Walid Touati	Algeria	14.36	
8	1	Nikolaos Tsonis	Greece	14.52	
9	8	Elior Sopher	Israel	14.74	
				Wind: -1.6 m/s	

==== Heat 3 ====
Rank	Lane	Athlete	Nation	Time	Notes
1	7	Richard Hall	Jamaica	13.58	Q
2	9	Matheo Boulineau	France	13.69	Q
3	8	Paulo Romualdo	Brazil	13.77	q
4	2	Hristyan Kasabov (Note: Hristyan Kasabov did not originally qualify for the semi-finals however due to Zeno Van Neygen opting to take no further part in the competition Kasabov was placed in to Heat 3 of the semi-finals.)	Bulgaria	13.82	q, PB
5	5	Tahj Brown	Bahamas	14.28	
6	4	Steven Leppoja	Estonia	14.29	
7	6	Eyal Uziel	Israel	14.32	
8	3	William Wong	Australia	14.85	
				Wind: -0.9 m/s	

==== Heat 4 ====
Rank	Lane	Athlete	Nation	Time	Notes
1	7	Daniel Goriola	Great Britain	13.41	Q
2	6	Zeno Van Neygen	Belgium	13.60	Q
3	9	Nils Leifert	Germany	13.68	q, SB
4	5	Yander L. Herrera	Cuba	13.79	q
5	3	Gediminas Kulpavičius	Lithuania	14.01	PB
6	8	Rashid Kabba	Australia	14.06	
7	1	Hwang Eui-chan	South Korea	14.26	
8	4	Zehr Gasmi	Algeria	14.27	
9	2	Hariharan Kathiravan	India	15.34	
				Wind: -0.9 m/s	

==== Heat 5 ====
Rank	Lane	Athlete	Nation	Time	Notes
1	5	Rasmus Vehmaa	Finland	13.60	Q
2	1	Kyousuke Yamanaka	Japan	13.73	Q
3	7	Even Grannes Pedersen	Norway	13.92	
4	9	Serge Taha	Ivory Coast	13.98	
5	2	Ričards Peders	Latvia	14.01	PB
6	4	Tommaso Triolo	Italy	14.23	
7	3	Raiko Kahr	Estonia	14.33	
8	6	Nayan Sarde	India	14.60	
9	8	Tayshaun Robinson	Bahamas	14.69	
				Wind: -1.1 m/s	

==== Heat 6 ====
Rank	Lane	Athlete	Nation	Time	Notes
1	4	Chen Yuanjiang	China	13.37	Q
2	5	Hsieh Yuan-kai	Chinese Taipei	13.49	Q
3	6	Timon Dethloff	Germany	14.00	
4	1	Saviola Waithira	Sweden	14.03	
5	8	Fabrizio Jara	Paraguay	14.44	
6	7	Güercio Pérez	Argentina	14.45	
7	2	Peter Dávid	Slovakia	14.46	
8	9	Ramón Fuenzalida	Chile	14.49	
–	3	Wihan Kemp	South Africa	DNF	
				Wind: -0.6 m/s	

==== Heat 7 ====
Rank	Lane	Athlete	Nation	Time	Notes
1	6	Oumar Abakar	Qatar	13.46	Q
2	4	Matyáš Zach	Czech Republic	13.55	Q
3	3	Theo Pedre	France	13.63	q
4	2	Radostin Milenov	Bulgaria	13.97	
5	8	Sandun Wijayalath	Sri Lanka	14.04	PB
6	7	Rayvon Walkin	Turks and Caicos Islands	14.12	NU20R
7	9	Jason Ravelo	Puerto Rico	14.33	
8	5	Adam Ilgo	Slovakia	14.77	
–	1	Keon Rude	Canada	DNF	
				Wind: -0.1 m/s	

==== Heat 8 ====
Rank	Lane	Athlete	Nation	Time	Notes
1	7	Noah Hanson	Great Britain	13.46	Q
2	3	Némo Rase	Belgium	13.49	Q
3	9	Daniel Castilla	Spain	13.59	q
4	5	Farkas Felber	Hungary	13.69	q
5	2	Girts Šenkevics	Latvia	14.07	
6	6	Rafael Santos	Portugal	14.13	
7	8	German Quiroz	Peru	15.13	
–	4	Adrian Rodríguez	Ecuador	DNF	
				Wind: -1.1 m/s	

=== Semi-finals ===
The first 2 athletes in each heat (Q) and the next 2 fastest (q) qualified to the semi-finals.

==== Heat 1 ====
Rank	Lane	Athlete	Nation	Time	Notes
1	7	Andre Korbmacher	United States	13.25	Q, PB
2	4	Némo Rase	Belgium	13.46	Q
3	5	Hsieh Yuan-kai	Chinese Taipei	13.63	
4	2	Farkas Felber	Hungary	13.71	
5	3	Matheo Boulineau	France	13.75	
6	9	Daniel Beckford	Jamaica	13.80	
7	8	Kyousuke Yamanaka	Japan	13.83	
–	6	Daniel Goriola	Great Britain	DNF	
				Wind: +0.7 m/s	

==== Heat 2 ====
Rank	Lane	Athlete	Nation	Time	Notes
1	7	Chen Yuanjiang	China	13.38	Q
2	6	Oumar Abakar	Qatar	13.40	Q
3	4	Rasmus Vehmaa	Finland	13.54	q
4	9	Yander L. Herrera	Cuba	13.62	q
5	2	Bojan Novaković	Serbia	13.88 (.871)	
6	8	Vinícius de Brito	Brazil	13.88 (.873)	
–	3	Daniel Castilla	Spain	DNF	
–	5	Matyáš Zach	Czech Republic	DNF	
				Wind: +0.6 m/s	

==== Heat 3 ====
Rank	Lane	Athlete	Nation	Time	Notes
1	6	Ja'Kobe Tharp	United States	13.11	Q, WU20L
2	7	Richard Hall	Jamaica	13.44	Q
3	8	Theo Pedre	France	13.66	
4	5	Noah Hanson	Great Britain	13.70	
5	3	Matteo Togni	Italy	13.71	
6	4	Hristyan Kasabov	Bulgaria	13.84	
7	9	Nils Leifert	Germany	13.88	
8	2	Paulo Romualdo	Brazil	14.76	
				Wind: -0.6 m/s	

=== Final ===
Rank	Lane	Athlete	Nation	Time	Notes
1st place, gold medalist(s)	4	Ja'Kobe Tharp	United States	13.05	WU20L
2nd place, silver medalist(s)	6	Andre Korbmacher	United States	13.14	PB
3rd place, bronze medalist(s)	7	Chen Yuanjiang	China	13.21	NU20R
4	5	Oumar Abakar	Qatar	13.44	
5	9	Yander L. Herrera	Cuba	13.46 (.452)	PB
6	3	Richard Hall	Jamaica	13.46 (.454)	
7	8	Némo Rase	Belgium	13.54	
–	2	Rasmus Vehmaa	Finland	DNF	
				Wind: -0.5 m/s	
