= List of 2025 Canada Summer Games medallists =

The following is the list of medallists from the 2025 Canada Summer Games held in St. Johns, Newfoundland and Labrador.

== Artistic swimming ==
Event	Gold		Silver		Bronze	
Women's solo	Andrea Escobar; Quebec	428.2808 pts	Morgan Vaughan; Saskatchewan	399.4955 pts	Madison Murphy; Ontario	398.7638 pts
Women's duet	Quebec; Lily Bernier; Andrea Escobar	498.5163 pts	Saskatchewan; Joley Friesen; Sienna Kuchuran	470.4715 pts	Alberta; Jasmine Peloquin; Kyla Williams	461.0388 pts
Team mix	Quebec; Lily Bernier; Nina Bernier; Andrea Escobar; Ariane Harvey; Noémie Jobin; Cassandra Lefebvre; Émily Mc Mahon; Elie Michaud; Coralie Pelletier; Dliane Rojas	668.8045 pts	Ontario; Maddy DeLazzari; Claudia Flood; Ella Giggs; Evelyn Goddard; Kaylynne Greensmith; Lauren Irvine; Madison Murphy; Isobel Padgett; Kate Sheu; Jessie Yu	660.9183 pts	Alberta; Penelope Badke; Mika Boldt Steen; Harlow Darragh; Makayla Lowdon; Myla McIvor; Elecra Papadopoulou; Jasmin Peloquin; Olivia Perkin; Lilian Wark; Kylia Williams	628.5564 pts

== Athletics ==
=== Men's ===
Event	Gold		Silver		Bronze	
100m	Keon Rude; Alberta	10.50	Domenic Barresi; Ontario	10.62	Williams Ogunnubi; Saskatchewan	10.62
100m Para Ambulatory	Brendan Cote Williamson; Saskatchewan	687 pts	Étienne Rheault; Quebec	407 pts	Hudson Booth; Ontario	343 pts
100m Special Olympics	Denzel Kamdem; Quebec	11.89	Gabriel Dupuy; Quebec	11.94	Bradyn Giraudier; Saskatchewan	12.09
100m Wheelchair	Dante Cormier; New Brunswick	520 pts	Gavin Baggs; Newfoundland and Labrador	228 pts	Matthew Dykstra; Alberta	85 pts
110m Hurdles	Adam Victor Andres; Manitoba	14.20	Tamarri Lindo; Ontario	14.38	Ryder King; Ontario	14.40
200m	Will Batley; Ontario	20.57	Jared Hiebert; Manitoba	20.76	Jackson Banks; New Brunswick	20.84
200m Special Olympics	Bradyn Giraudier; Saskatchewan	23.56	Jacob Rylan Rafuse; Nova Scotia	23.66	Gabriel Dupuy; Quebec	23.80
400m	Mickael Allaire; Quebec	47.32	Zach Jeggo; Ontario	47.74	Nico Claramunt; Alberta	48.05
400m Para Ambulatory	Brendan Cote Williamson; Saskatchewan	758 pts	Étienne Rheault; Quebec	508 pts	Hudson Booth; Ontario	241 pts
400m Wheelchair	Dante Cormier; New Brunswick	176 pts	Gavin Baggs; Newfoundland and Labrador	55 pts	Tai Young; Ontario	21 pts
400m Hurdles	Ryder King; Ontario	52.03	James Kerr; British Columbia	53.49	Carter Tuplin; Saskatchewan	53.97
800m	Zach James; Nova Scotia	1:50.40	Robin Lefebvre; Quebec	1:50.54	Michael Hussey; Saskatchewan	1:50.79
1500m	Robin Lefebvre; Quebec	3:48.04	Jonathan Podbielski; Saskatchewan	3:48.40	Silas Conlin-Morse; Nova Scotia	3:50.60
1500m Wheelchair	Gavin Baggs; Newfoundland and Labrador		Dante Cormier; New Brunswick		Tai Young; Ontario	
3000m Steeplechase	Xavier Lemaître; Quebec	8:55.06	Xavier Perras-Phaneuf; Quebec	8:55.15	Dylan Uhrich; British Columbia	9:00.87
5000m	Jonathan Podbielski; Saskatchewan	14:09.75	Xavier Perras-Phaneuf; Quebec	14:11.33	Nolan Turgeon; Quebec	14:20.05
4 × 100 m Relay	Ontario; Domenic Barresi; Will Batley; Travis Campbell; Tamarri Lindo	40.33	Quebec; Zachary Elkin; Gabriel Mompoint; Mickael Allaire; Jaydon Elkin	40.73	Saskatchewan; Olufemi Akinloye; Geovanne Powell; Liam Oster; Williams Ogunnubi	40.95
4 × 400 m Relay	Ontario; William Batley; Zachary Jeggo; Ryder King; Ben Tilson	3:10.94	Quebec; Karim Slim; Yasser Riad; Cedrik Flipo; Mickael Allaire	3:11.69	Alberta; Farsan Abdi; Nico Claramunt; Malachi Muir; Caiden Schultz	3:12.31
Decathlon	Édouard Lavoie Beaulieu; Quebec	6,974 pts	Max Mazerolle; New Brunswick	6,348 pts	Logan Kok; Saskatchewan	6,259 pts
Discus	Weezy Eze; Alberta	50.79m	Connor Fraser; Ontario	47.97m	A.J. Stanat; Ontario	47.56m
Para Discus	Mathieu Dorais; Quebec	687 pts	Rémi Daniel Ouellette; New Brunswick	279 pts	David Lipton; Saskatchewan	252 pts
Hammer	Jake McEachern; Alberta	58.94m	Sean Reimer; Alberta	58.07m	Mason Andulajevic; British Columbia	56.09m
High Jump	Thomas Sénéchal-Becker; Ontario	2.12m	Tristan Boateng; Ontario	2.10m	Zandre Castello; Manitoba	2.04m
Javelin	Will Torrance; Ontario	71.01m	Charles-Édouard Hamon; Quebec	66.06m	Daxx Turner; Manitoba	59.05m
Long Jump	Kenneth West; Ontario	7.58m	Arman Shahzadeh; Ontario	7.18m	Robbie Gerstner; Manitoba	7.12m
Pole vault	Édouard Lavoie Beaulieu; Quebec	5.16m	Gabriel Genest; Quebec	5.05m	William Millard; British Columbia	4.55m
Shot Put	A.J. Stanat; Ontario	17.04m	Nathan Pinno; Saskatchewan	16.48m	Weezy Eze; Alberta	16.07m
Shot Put Para	Mathieu Dorais; Quebec	1,024 pts	David Lipton; Saskatchewan	421 pts	Rémi Daniel Ouellette; New Brunswick	356 pts
Triple Jump	Daxx Turner; Manitoba	15.39m	Lauchlan Robert Irish; British Columbia	15.21m	Ade Adegbosin; Manitoba	14.73m

=== Women's ===
Event	Gold		Silver		Bronze	
100m	Gabrielle Cole; Ontario	11.70	Maria Ulysse; Quebec	11.74	Elizabeth Tannis; Ontario	11.84
100m Para Ambulatory	Chloe Dunbar; Nova Scotia	10 pts	Not awarded		Not awarded	
100m Special Olympics	Riley Bell; Ontario	14.36	Regan Hofley; Manitoba	14.45	Olivia Neuman; British Columbia	14.75
100m Wheelchair	Jessi Guerrier; British Columbia	130 pts	Britney Volkman; Alberta	91 pts	Brooke Laurel Perepeluk; British Columbia	72 pts
100m Hurdles	Aliyah Logan; Ontario	13.41	Kimoya Edwards; Alberta	13.86	Maoly St-Germain; Quebec	13.92
200m	Frédérique Chiasson; Quebec	23.08	Hailee Woodhouse; Saskatchewan	23.60	Grace Igbiki; Saskatchewan	23.97
200m Special Olympics	Regan Hofley; Manitoba	29.05	Riley Bell; Ontario	29.79	Olivia Neuman; British Columbia	31.27
400m	Tayen Werner; Saskatchewan	54.40	Hailee Woodhouse; Saskatchewan	54.97	Julia Vallée; Quebec	55.92
400m Para Ambulatory	Vesta Orchard; Manitoba	3 pts	Not awarded		Not awarded	
400m Wheelchair	Britney Volkman; Alberta	37 pts	Jessi Guerrier; British Columbia	15 pts	Lauren Redwood; Ontario	1 pt
400m Hurdles	Shelby MacIsaac; New Brunswick	1:00.01	Sydney Freeman; Ontario	1:01.13	Happy Oluwasikun; Saskatchewan; Erika Lealess; Ontario	1:01.81; 1:01.79 (Cons.)
800m	Jade Lenton; British Columbia	2:08.46	Shelby MacIsaac; New Brunswick	2:09.08	Jenica Swartz; Alberta	2:09.09
1500m	Jenica Swartz; Alberta	4:18.63	Hannah Gates; Saskatchewan	4:19.75	Hallee Knelsen; Ontario	4:21.53
1500m Wheelchair	Maggie Slessor; Alberta		Lauren Redwood; Ontario		Britney Volkman; Alberta	
3000m Steeplechase	Sophie Courville; Quebec	10:08.55	Elysse Fleming; British Columbia	10:29.70	Frances MacLeod; Nova Scotia	10:35.12
5000m	Sophie Courville; Quebec	16:52.32	Eileen Mae Benoit; Nova Scotia	16:53.09	Léane Baril; Quebec	17:01.65
4 × 100 m Relay	British Columbia; Jordyn Reed; Alexia Latore; Jaeland Cummings; Hanna Sobkowich	45.73	Saskatchewan; Selena Keyowski; Timi Adelugba; Hailee Woodhouse; Grace Igbiki	46.14	Manitoba; Jordyn Davis; Kyla Finley; Zoe Nonato; Ayomipo Olutoto; Lillian Waldner	46.25
4 × 400 m Relay	Saskatchewan; Grace Igbiki; Tayen Werner; Nayasa Woods; Hailee Woodhouse	3:40.42	British Columbia; Alexia Latore; Jade Lenton; Elisabeth McDowell-Mitchell; Hanna Sobkowich	3:41.60	Quebec; Frederique Chiasson; Morgane Drouin; Myriam Deslandes; Julia Vallee	3:47.10
Discus	Jenna Tunks; Ontario	49.66m	Jin Shomachuk; Alberta	46.81m	Keighan DeCoff; Nova Scotia	42.35m
Para Discus	Addisyn Franceschini; Ontario	671 pts	Christel Robichaud; New Brunswick	659 pts	Joanne Lee; Ontario	394 pts
Hammer	Jin Shomachuk; Alberta	58.80m	Aisling Tcheutchoua; Quebec	53.70m	Lauren Curtis; British Columbia	51.69m
Heptathlon	Shelaine Pritchard; Saskatchewan	5,167 pts	Rebecca Parker; Ontario	4,894 pts	Paige Zinger; Alberta	4,683 pts
High jump	Isla Skye Stewart; British Columbia	1.73m	Lara Denbow; Manitoba	1.70m	Laurie Boisvert; Quebec	1.70m
Javelin	Eniko Sara; British Columbia	51.23m	Julia Elisabeth Konigshofer; Nova Scotia	45.15m	Dayley Reimer; Alberta	42.14m
Long Jump	Fiola Tejiofo; Quebec	5.94m	Shelaine Pritchard; Saskatchewan	5.93m	Brooklyn Taylor; Ontario	5.81m
Pole Vault	Rachel Grenke; Alberta	3.85m	Grace Elford; Ontario	3.75m	Erica Gibson; Ontario	3.50m
Shot Put	Efe Shaquana Latham; Quebec	14.97m	Audrée LeBlanc; New Brunswick	13.89m	Jessica Gyamfi; Ontario	13.22m
Shot Put Para	Christel Robichaud; New Brunswick	719 pts	Addisyn Franceschini; Ontario	595 pts	Joanne Lee; Ontario	499 pts
Triple Jump	Olamide Olaloku; Saskatchewan	12.23m	Peace Omonzane; Ontario	11.96m	Maja Husain; Nova Scotia	11.64m

== Baseball ==
Event	Gold	Silver	Bronze
Men's	British Columbia; Oscar Leah; Kadyn Armitage; Connor Simpson; Rhys Whiteford; Madden Peters; Tyler McWhinnie; Lucas Wheeler; Luke Laird; Matthew McAdam; Caine Fahrni; Carter Bestebroer; Kayden Militello; Ewan Tusa; Will Zielisnki; Jake McAdam; Austin Meinen; Desi Tregaskis; Jack Mello; Cole Dorland; Dylan De Meyer	Quebec; Raphael Besançon; Alekk Biasone; Max Blain; Drazic Charbonneau; Raphaël Contant; Thomas Côté-Collard; Zachary Gauthier; Josué Gélinas; Maxime Lamarre; Jean-Michel Laplante; Charles Lépine; Mathieu Levesque; Eliott Malo; William Nolet; Arnold Ohanian; Lucas St-Laurent; Josh Theriault; Ludovic Therriault; Matis Trahan; Lham Yeo	Saskatchewan; Reese Brons; Landon Hebig; Aidan Marien; Aiden Kilshaw; Keaton LeJan; Jarret Rude; Cade Britz; Reid Olfert; Dylan Pura; Tucker Jesson; Pryor Dyck; Trentin Kooy; Casey Rauckman; Josh Gutek; Michell Rauckman; Mason Fauser; Kash Berg; Brandt Spencer; Rhett Anderson; Jackson Bradford
Women's	Ontario; Victoria Curro; Maya Grossinger; Sophia Yuki Audet; Paizleigh McKinley; Avery Wilson; Savannah Perry; Akira Takeshima; Peyton Chung; Sofia Milks; Zoe McGregor; Ashlynn Jolicoeur; Jadyn Sagert; Olivia Westfall; Finleigh Kane; Sophie Horton; Ava Silva	Alberta; Anneke Webster; Cora Rydel; Oakley Tanner; Hadley Prehn; Sophia Welbourn; Kamryn Kutzner; Taylor Elines; Avery Mullin; Ella Tillsey; Claire Hingley; Ara Siemens; Brooke Forslund; Gracy Hadwin; Tessa Klassen; Abby Szilagyi; Sydney Klebanosky	British Columbia; Lily Chang; Addi Dorland; Ava Dawson; Daphne Haskins; Logan Grant; Aliyah Weckerle; Jessica Slater; Stella Berry; Layla Spencer; Emma Lecompte; Ella Estoque; Olivia Roos; Kamryn Dyck; Lucy Gutierrez

== Basketball ==
Event	Gold	Silver	Bronze
Men's	Alberta; LeMar Shir; Totu Akuentok; Elijah Thomas; Isaiah Hinds; Bol Bol; Tharngoap Thokbuom; Jahkeem Damaj; Kade McGeachy; Deng Ngor; Nathan Yambayamba; Athian Madut; Clyde Mbachu	Ontario; Kenyon St. Louis; Isaiah Lukusa; Javion Tyndale; CJ Roberts; Alessandro Acosta-Reyes; Kymani Walters; Isaiah Clarke; Godson Okokoh; Zachary Downer; Markeese Strawbridge; Tutu Toto; Emmanuel Oko-Oboh	British Columbia; Joe Linder; Blake Bye; Nathan Chen; Aidan Dayco-Green; Judah Ashbee; Ashton Wong; Illia Maydan; Hart Kreter; Crewe Preston; Jack Snead; Taige Roberts; Luka Guzina
Women's	Alberta; Ailey Marshall; Amanda Guss; Pippa Gibb; Kyla Bednarek; Haiden Hall; Olivia Richardson; Ambrie Busenius; Emerald Nnani; Avery Zulak; Alfreda Okolie; Ella Auch; Ashley Newman	Ontario; Ayla Corrigale; Nina Visnjevac; Ocean Dennis; Chanté Murray; Amaya Robinson; Emma Firth; Mia Mazzuca; Akeila Bailey; Scarlett Smith; Sarah Guignard; Emma Dongelmans; Averie Varhaug	Nova Scotia; Natalia Colley; Dee Gibson; Gabby Morash; Molly Sancton; Ella Hoyt; Lexie Moores; Isobel MacDonald; Jesse McCarron; Malaya Leger; Alice Macdonald; Eva O'Brien; Lily Blondon

== Box lacrosse ==
Event	Gold	Silver	Bronze
Men's	Ontario; Finn Topping; Nate Nyarko; Aiden Kellough; Stephen West; Chase Carson; Liam Turner; Brodie Haynes; Kieran Witte; Lucas Ward; Barrett Hands; Ty Thompson; Robert Kee; Mason Elliott; Isaac Snell; Kyle Cleland; Tylar Fairhead; Vincent Ward; Colton D'Amico	British Columbia; Callum Cox; Deacon Lockwood; Cayden Johnston; Colton Craiggs; Sawyer McKay; Alec McNamara; Dylan Massa; Dominic Allegretto; William Lockwood VI; Cameron Smith; Spencer White; Silas Gagnon; Ram Tomas; Ripley Wyker; Peter Gombar; Aaron MacRae; Jordan Barry Gagnon; Jojo Allen	Alberta; Luc Catudal; Landry Mitton; Carter Mitchell; Lewis Betteridge; Jamie Jackson; Ajay Hannigan; Ryder Harrison; Reid Davies; Kalem Jenkins; Josh Armstrong; Liam James; Charlie Graham; Kian Siemens; Braeden de Groot; Ethan Dosdall; Beckett Davis; Ronin Thompson; Cody Hansen
Women's	British Columbia; Sophie Sheppard; Saia Hansra; Paige Downey; Rylee Wing; Tylana Beth Beitel; Callie Murphy; Sienna Vahra; Peyton Campbell; Brooklyn Alexander; Alivia Smigielski; Jolaine Bolam; Halle Dhaliwal; Rosie Norman; Azure Turner; Paige Kirby; Zyla Wickert; Abby Jung; Teagan MacNeil	Alberta; Reese Mckay; Brooklyn Bentley; Maddy MacKinnon; Mia Mahfouz; Bronwyn Fisher; Avery Ashley; Kayla Beaulieu; Eva Green; Abigail Craig; Kaylee Jamieson; Ruby Walbridge; Megan Contreras; Avery Rogers; Claire Chudleigh; Chloe Vetter; Avery Michaluk; Violet Crawford; Izzie Humphrey Jarek	Ontario; Annabelle White; Janessa Griffith; Zoe Kirner; Emilynn Chapman; Olivia Windley; Hayley Armstrong; Carleigh Hill; Farah Garlow; Gillian Kee; Reese Jones; Ellie Stewart; Anastasia Terrance; Sophia Howat; Lucia Ruscitti; Taylor Thornley; Rayne Noganosh; Charlie Lang; Kyleigh Payne

== Canoe/Kayak ==
=== Canoe ===
Event	Gold		Silver		Bronze	
Men's C-1 200m	Eric Chouinard; Nova Scotia	45.587	Jeffrey Sun; British Columbia	47.510	Aleksander Seremak; Manitoba	49.215
Men's C-1 500m	Émile Bouvier; Quebec	2:05.576	Duncan Giles; Nova Scotia	2:07.837	Nicholas Shirokov; Ontario	2:09.281
Men's C-1 1000m	Émile Bouvier; Quebec	5:02.747	Alec MacAulay; Nova Scotia	5:21.625	Baer Robertson; Saskatchewan	5:31.775
Men's C-1 5000m	Elliot Arnautovitch; Quebec	27:49.338	Alex MacNeil; Nova Scotia	28:55.338	William Wintoniw; Manitoba	39:05.643
Men's C-2 200m	Quebec; Elliot Arnautovitch; Émile Bouvier	39.585	Nova Scotia; Eric Chouinard; Alex MacNeil	40.207	British Columbia; Alex Smith; Jeffrey Sun	41.546
Men's C-2 500m	Nova Scotia; Eric Chouinard; Duncan Giles; Elliot Arnautovitch; Émile Bouvier	2:06.178	Quebec; Elliot Arnautovitch; Émile Bouvier	2:11.117	British Columbia; Alex Smith; Jeffrey Sun	2:15.444
Men's C-2 1000m	Quebec; Elliot Arnautovitch; Émile Bouvier	4:26.670	Nova Scotia; Alec MacAulay; Alex MacNeil	4:31.887	Ontario; Cole Norman; Nicholas Shirokov	4:35.065
Men's IC-4 200m	Nova Scotia; Eric Chouinard; Duncan Giles; Alec MacAulay; Alex MacNeil	38.527	British Columbia; Corben Hickey; Nate Neuls; Alex Smith; Jeffrey Sun	40.266	Quebec; Elliot Arnautovitch; Émile Bouvier; Antoine Gamache; Noa Piché	40.433
Men's IC-4 500m	Nova Scotia; Eric Chouinard; Duncan Giles; Alec MacAulay; Alex MacNeil	1:51.008	Quebec; Elliot Arnautovitch; Émile Bouvier; Antoine Gamache; Étienne Gamache	1:55.442	British Columbia; Corben Hickey; Nate Neuls; Alex Smith; Jeffrey Sun	1:58.292
Women's C-1 200m	Amélie Laliberté; Quebec	48.968	Ruby Stella Muhl; Ontario	49.484	Keisa Bleiler; British Columbia	51.173
Women's C-1 500m	Isabel Lowry; Ontario	2:40.059	Kiira Saarenoja; Alberta	2:45.403	Victoria Tran; Nova Scotia	2:45.514
Women's C-1 1000m	Madeleine Beauregard; Ontario	5:31.080	Veronica So; British Columbia	5:36.841	Alexia Gagnon; Quebec	5:37.369
Women's C-1 5000m	Veronica So; British Columbia	34:00.405	Madeleine Beauregard; Ontario	34:07.278	Charlotte C. Désy; Quebec	34:21.317
Women's C-2 200m	Quebec; Léanne Castonguay; Amélie Laliberté	49.878	Ontario; Abbigail Haines; Ruby Stella Muhl	50.572	Nova Scotia; Ella Conzens; Elle MacKenzie	51.217
Women's C-2 500m	Nova Scotia; Grace Theunissen; Victoria Tran	2:22.021	Ontario; Madeleine Beauregard; Isaebel Lowry	2:23.460	Quebec; Charlotte C. Désy; Amélie Laliberté	2:28.049
Women's C-2 1000m	Nova Scotia; Ella Cozens; Marcy Meisner	5:11.443	Ontario; Madeleine Beauregard; Abbigail Haines	5:19.693	Quebec; Charlotte C. Désy; Alexia Gagnon	5:23.238
Women's IC-4 200m	Ontario; Madeleine Beauregard; Abbigail Haines; Isabel Lowry; Julia Price; Quebec; Léanne Castonguay; Charlotte C. Désy; Alexia Gagnon; Amélie Laliberté	43.719	Not awarded		Nova Scotia; Ella Cozens; Elle MacKenzie; Marcy Meisner; Victoria Tran	45.285
Women's IC-4 500m	Ontario; Abbigail Haines; Isabel Lowry; Ruby Stella Muhl; Julia Price	2:13.783	Nova Scotia; Ella Cozens; Ella MacKenzie; Marcy Meisner; Victoria Tran	2:14.777	Quebec; Léanne Castonguay; Charlotte C. Désy; Alexia Gagnon; Amélie Laliberté	2:14.866
Mixed C-2 500m	Nova Scotia; Anna Archibald; Tate Levy	2:08.516	Quebec; Émile Bouvier; Charlotte C. Désy	2:08.888	Ontario; Wesley Bartlett; Ruby Stella Muhl	2:19.799

=== Kayak ===
Event	Gold		Silver		Bronze	
Men's K-1 200m	Frederic Brais-Miklosi; Ontario	37.654	Luke Enns; Manitoba	37.770	Raphaël Côté; Quebec	39.276
Men's K-1 500m	Ryan Naroditsky; Ontario	1:55.232	Alex Erith-Ellwood; Nova Scotia	1:55.487	Raphaël Côté; Quebec	1:56.715
Men's K-1 1000m	Alex Erith-Ellwood; Nova Scotia; Owen MacLean; Ontario	4:14.311	Not awarded		Thomas Sinotte; Quebec	4:23.328
Men's K-1 5000m	Carson Corey; Ontario	24:28.423	Raphaël Côté; Quebec	24:29.739	Luke Enns; Manitoba	24:30.100
Men's K-2 200m	Ontario; Frederic Brais-Miklosi; Ryan Naroditsky	35.056	Quebec; Cedric Liu; Raphaël Côté	36.751	Nova Scotia; Nick LaPierre; Carter Naugler	37.584
Men's K-2 500m	Ontario; Frederic Brais-Miklosi; Ryan Naroditsky	1:44.133	Nova Scotia; Conrad Hoogerboord; Tate Levy	1:45.633	Quebec; Raphaël Côté; Jérémy Pelletier	1:47.511
Men's K-2 1000m	Nova Scotia; Alex Erith-Ellwood; Tate Levy	3:52.299	Ontario; Carson Corey; Owen MacLean	3:58.333	Quebec; Raphaël Côté; Thomas Sinotte	4:05.005
Men's K-4 200m	Ontario; Frederic Brais-Miklosi; Carson Corey; Owen MacLean; Ryan Naroditsky	33.642	Quebec; Raphaël Côté; Cedric Liu; Jérémy Pelletier; Thomas Sinotte	33.670	Nova Scotia; Alex Erith-Ellwood; Conrad Hoogerboord; Nick LaPierre; Carter Naugler	34.448
Men's K-4 500m	Ontario; Frederic Brais-Miklosi; Carson Corey; Owen MacLean; Ryan Naroditsky	1:36.241	Nova Scotia; Alex Erith-Ellwood; Conrad Hoogerboord; Nick LaPierre; Tate Levy	1:37.163	Quebec; Raphaël Côté; Cedric Liu; Jérémy Pelletier; Thomas Sinotte	1:39.341
Women's K-1 200m	Alina Tverie; Quebec	46.777	Kate Osborne; Ontario	49.255	Emilee Vaters; Nova Scotia	50.205
Women's K-1 500m	Anna Archibald; Nova Scotia	2:13.617	Kate Osborne; Ontario	2:14.878	Alina Tverie; Quebec	2:18.545
Women's K-1 1000m	Anna Archibald; Nova Scotia	5:02.338	Eva Looper; Ontario	5:08.210	Florence Hamel; Quebec	5:21.815
Women's K-1 5000m	Erika Walsh; Nova Scotia	27:11.113	Eva Looper; Ontario	27:47.513	Mathilde Patry; Quebec	27:49.791
Women's K-2 200m	Quebec; Calina Bidal; Alina Tverie	41.800	Nova Scotia; Anna Archibald; Emilee Vaters	42.334	Ontario; Maea Knights; Kate Osborne	42.578
Women's K-2 500m	Ontario; Maea Knights; Kate Osborne	2:06.709	Nova Scotia; Elizabeth Fanok; Emilee Vaters	2:09.354	Quebec; Marie Chamberland; Alina Tverie	2:15.165
Women's K-2 1000m	Nova Scotia; Elizabeth Fanok; Erika Walsh	4:36.796	Ontario; Cassie Kenny; Eva Looper	4:44.196	Quebec; Marie Chamberland; Florence Hamel	4:47.174
Women's K-4 200m	Quebec; Calina Bidal; Marie Chamberland; Florence Hamel; Alina Tverie	40.521	Nova Scotia; Anna Archibald; Elzabeth Fanok; Emilee Vaters; Erika Walsh	41.215	Ontario; Cassie Kenny; Maea Knights; Eva Looper; Kate Osborne	42.287
Women's K-4 500m	Nova Scotia; Anna Archibald; Elibaeth Fanok; Emilee Vaters; Erika Walsh	1:49.166	Ontario; Cassie Kenny; Maea Knights; Eva Looper; Kate Osborne	1:53.283	Quebec; Marie Chamberland; Florence Hamel; Mathilde Patry; Alina Tverie	1:53.733
Mixed K-2 500m	Ontario; Carson Corey; Eva Looper	1:50.447	Nova Scotia; Anna Archibald; Tate Levy	1:50.508	Quebec; Calina Bidal; Thomas Sinotte	1:56.919

== Cycling ==
=== Mountain bike ===
Event	Gold		Silver		Bronze	
Men's Cross Country	Soren Weselake; Manitoba	1:30:55	Mika Comaniuk; Quebec	1:31:05	Ethan Wood; British Columbia	1:31:05
Men's Relay	Quebec; Mika Comaniuk; Raphael Piché; Maxime St-Onge	36:06.89	British Columbia; Rhett Bates; Maddox Johnson; Ethan Wood	36:23.67	Ontario; Farland Lamont; Liam McFarlane; Evan Moore	37:38.61
Men's Sprint	Mika Comaniuk; Quebec	26:25	Raphael Piché; Quebec	26:25	Ethan Wood; British Columbia	26:33
Women's Cross Country	Maude Ruelland; Quebec	1:33.29	Nico Knoll; Alberta	1:34.12	Lacey Dennis; British Columbia	1:34.28
Women's Relay	Quebec; Éliane Blais; Ayana Gagné; Maude Ruelland	43:17.25	Ontario; Clare Hauber; Alexa Haviland	43:54.43	British Columbia; Brooke Bates; Lacey Dennis; Ellie Winchell	44:42.81
Women's Sprint	Maude Ruelland; Quebec	24:18	Éliane Blais; Quebec	24:28	Ellie Winchell; British Columbia	24:40

=== Road ===
Event	Gold		Silver		Bronze	
Men's Criterium	Maxime Bourassa; Quebec	36 pts	Jonathan Hinse; Quebec	28 pts	Hudson Lubbers; Ontario	15 pts
Men's Individual Time Trial	Jacob Roy; Quebec	31:16.11	Gabriel Séguin; Quebec	3:17.90	Soren Weselake; Manitoba	3:42.17
Para Men's Individual Time Trial	Joseph Vachon; Quebec	29:09.29	Daniel Bigu; Ontario	35:19.41	Andrew Kooger; Ontario	37:15.67
Men's Road Race	Gabriel Séguin; Quebec	3:04:58	Jonathan Hinse; Quebec	3:04:58	Jacob Roy; Quebec	3:04:58
Para Men's Road Race	Joseph Vachon; Quebec	46:55.00	Daniel Bigu; Ontario	56:37.00	Andrew Kooger; Ontario	1:01:35.00
Women's Criterium	Kimberly Chen; British Columbia	26 pts	Elly Moore; Ontario	16 pts	Molly Flynn; New Brunswick	11 pts
Women's Individual Time Trial	Amaia Ervin-Arambarri; Alberta	17:53.63	Pascale Savard; Quebec	18:07.17	Julia Snelgrove; Nova Scotia	18:35.77
Women's Road Race	Abigaël Fortier; Quebec	2:47:49.01	Molly Flynn; New Brunswick	2:47:49.02	Julia Snelgrove; Nova Scotia	2:47:49.03
Para Women's Road Race	Camille René; Quebec	52:15.00	Myriam Adam; Quebec	1:04:04.00	Not awarded	
Para Women's Individual Time Trial	Camille René; Quebec	33:37.26	Myriam Adam; Quebec	38:01.04	Not awarded	

== Diving ==
Event	Gold		Silver		Bronze	
Men's 1m Springboard	Samuel Talbot; Quebec	265.35 pts	Claude-Olivier Lisé-Coderre; Quebec	253.30 pts	Arnaud Corbeil; Quebec	242.15 pts
Men's 3m Springboard	Samuel Talbot; Quebec	320.10 pts	Jackson Congdon; British Columbia	316.95 pts	Kash Tarasoff; Saskatchewan	316.50 pts
Men's Artistic	Samuel Talbot; Quebec	220.80 pts	Arnaud Corbeil; Quebec	219.00 pts	Mattias Frohloff; British Columbia	215.00 pts
Men's Platform	Claude-Olivier Lisé-Coderre; Quebec	358.35 pts	Kash Tarasoff; Saskatchewan	352.05 pts	Samuel Talbot; Quebec	352.00 pts
Women's 1m Springboard	Lila Stewart; Saskatchewan	263.35 pts	Aurelie Sevigny; Quebec	247.10 pts	Mathilde Laberge; Quebec	245.90 pts
Women's 3m Springboard	Aurelie Sevigny; Quebec	284.15 pts	Mathilde Laberge; Quebec	271.60 pts	Lila Stewart; Saskatchewan	264.00 pts
Women's Artistic	Lila Stewart; Saskatchewan	221.70 pts	Isa Koop; Saskatchewan	198.15 pts	Ella Lindsay; Ontario	196.85 pts
Women's Platform	Mathilde Laberge; Quebec	301.65	Katie Buchel; Ontario	262.60	Livia Mckibbin; Quebec	245.10
Mixed Team	Saskatchewan; Kash Tarasoff; Lila Stewart; Isa Koop	562.45 pts	Quebec; Livia McKibbin; Arnaud Corbeil; Samuel Talbot	514.20 pts	Quebec; Claude-Olivier Lisé-Coderre; Adrian Insogna; Kelly-Ann Tessier; Mathilde Laberge	502.05 pts

== Golf ==
Event	Gold		Silver		Bronze	
Men's Individual	Austin Krahn; British Columbia	284	Kooper MacKay; Nova Scotia	299	Ethan Hunter; Saskatchewan	303
Women's Individual	Leonie Tavares; Quebec	299	Evelyn Ma; Ontario	307	Jenny Kwon; British Columbia	307
Mixed Team	British Columbia; Austin Krahn; Jenny Kwon; Alex Zhang	580	Quebec; Zack Bourgeois; Mikaël Coupal; Sofia De Zordo; Leonie Tavares	601	Ontario; Evelyn Ma; Carlee Meilleur; Ashton Rinaldi; Matthew Simpson	608

== Rugby Sevens ==
Event	Gold	Silver	Bronze
Men's	Ontario; Briar Barron; Emmett Rahiri; Daniel Muzaliwa; Tyge Harvey; Devonne Henry; Ali Amr Reda; Finn Hughes; Adam James Doane; Jack Priestman; Koen Schroeder; Joe Kaufmann; Declan Crew-Gee	British Columbia; Joshua McIndoe; Spencer Cotie; Liam Turnbull; Jonty Nicholas; Ty Driscoll; Liam James; Reece Conlan Thompson; Jasper Kesat; Evan Palmer; Elijah Shannon Palov; Michael Oughtred; Jackson Powell	Quebec; Wyatt Carr; Thomas Godart; Chaz Grenier; Ricardo Hamed; Kai Hucal; Michael McGuinness; Maxime Plantevin; Gabriel Ricci; Ben Robidas; Damon Scharfe; Nicolas Tissier; Jay Yetman
Women's	British Columbia; Ayana Titifanua; Claudia Vallance; Poppy Elcock; Louie McKenzie; Kamryn Howlett; Tayla Kempf; Belle Rousseau; Rafielle Barrack; Marin O'Regan; Amber Vallance; Lily McCluskey; Emma Narraway	Ontario; Arianna Masala; ShonDreya Smardon; Sydney Young; Lauren Smith; Payton Carter; Julia Beasley; Grace Dingwall; Isabelle McGinnis; Ainsley McDonell; Emily Hopper; Drew Spencer; Teniola Epemolu	Alberta; Sydney Tasic; Emily Plant; Shanelle Mann; Kayla MacLean; Lucy Finnson; Ruby Lastiwka; Madi Kutsch; Sydney Wollbaum; Rowan McLellan; Emerson Hanrahan; Gemma Ogoke; Maya North

== Sailing ==
Event	Gold		Silver		Bronze	
Men's Single Handed ILCA	Sullivan Nakatsu; Nova Scotia	13 pts	Brodie Sorensen; Ontario	31 pts	Enzo Biello; Quebec	38 pts
Men's Double Handed 29er	Nova Scotia; Ethan Thompson; Henry Simms	19 pts	British Columbia; Colin Gilley; Matt Young	31 pts	Ontario; Sterling Ott; Jack Gillis	36 pts
Women's Single Handed ILCA	Claire Daley; Nova Scotia	21 pts	Elena Graham; British Columbia	25 pts	Evania Lovshin; Quebec	30 pts
Women's Double Handed 29er	British Columbia; Ayden Kuo; Alexis Kuo	24 pts (Net 15)	Nova Scotia; Freida Smith; Laura Eisenhauer	21 pts (Net 18)	Ontario; Sarah Kenny; Nicole Otton	27 pts (Net 24)

== Soccer ==
Event	Gold	Silver	Bronze
Men's	Quebec; Adam Allou; Michael Ampofo; Amine Attar; Eliakim Awonongbadje; Matteo Carmosino; Philippe Chartrand; Miles Douglas; Liam Guay; Darryl Guerrier; Marcus Lubérisse; Alexander Makarova George; Arthur Masson; Ali Messoudi; Thomas Milhomme; Christian N'sa; Diego Nué-Brito; Daniel Panait; Louka Pohu	Alberta; Blake Morrison; Kyrie Welch; Ben Zimola; Xavier Chahal; Robson Massey; Nico Munoz; Ethan Darpoh; Santino Rojas; Azariah Abebe; Lucas Kohlman; Jaxon Marchant; Beckham Loyer-Beswick; Garrett Smith; Max Gwynne; Emmanuel Gebeyehu; Barry Ogbolu; Jordy Gidney; Luka Dolanjski	British Columbia; Brady McLarty; Elijah Clarke; Razik Walji; Tyler Marsden; Will Edgson; Declan Froh; Will Armitage; Joe MacKenzie-Elrick; Aidan Nielsen; Mattias Vales; Alessandro Troisi; Venney Chernyshev; Aiden Muzio; Damian Jamal; Brandon Thomas; Markus Blount; Eddie Ferrier; Jakes Beresford
Women's	Ontario; Madeleine Boucher; Azaiya Patterson; Riéle Nembhard; Fiona Cortes-Browne; Vanessa Kaminski-Roth; Meaghan Cochrane; Daneeka Medley; Olivia Tapping; Sabrina Morra; Samantha Cardoso; Chiamaka Omeze; Sofia Pagnotta; Sydney Taylor; Iris Oppong; Paige Rueffer; Danica Menard; Annalisa Colangelo; Myah Russell	Quebec; Alexia Adimmah; Juliane Belanger; Melianne Berthe; Éléonore Blouin; Charlie Rose Caron; Olivia Chartier; Clodie Cousineau; Noémie Faucher; Marilou Harvey; Kayla Kamdem; Romane Lanni; Kylie Mitchell; Fana-Sally Ndiaye; Aïdé Pokou; Juliette Portugais; Angelica Rossi; Lydia Tarani; Camille Tremblay	Nova Scotia; Kenney May; Rebecca McDow; Adele Workman; Jane van Kessel; Ava MacDonald; Georgia Miller; Genevieve Sherlock; Mya MacCormick; Liz Atkinson; Melissa Mert; Julia Akao; Kylie Buchanan; Sadie Delorey; Michiko Olaco; Emily Hall; Jada Buchanan; Sydney Young; Charlotte Audain

== Softball ==
Event	Gold	Silver	Bronze
Men's	Ontario; Alex McGillivray; Kalib Stonefish; Dakota McComb; Connor Paige; Matt Van De Wynckel; Will Myers; Jared Vosper; Joseph Weiler; Keenan Bateman; Sean Demarest; Sam Diamond; Mike Walker; Trent Agnello; Gavin Brooks; Conner Hopper	Quebec; Charles-Étienne Asselin; Hubert Asselin; Hunter Beauregard; Vincent Blais; Jeremy Breton; Mika Houle; Cade Kuehl; Nathan Labrie; Rémi Lafond; Félix Lavallée; Sharl Leclerc; Jérémy Martin; Julien Noel; Mark Tomatuk; Maverick Turgeon	Nova Scotia; David Perrin; Broden VanTassell; Luther Clair; Cameron Paul Euloth; Ewan White; Lucas Marshall; Cam Weatherbee; Colby Brown; Keegan Maguire; Rylan Sutherland; Cooper Singer; Will Singer; Ty Campbell; Jack Miller; Gavin Harrison
Women's	British Columbia; Taitumn Reynen; Tegan Harnett; Elli Thompson; Haydn Milley; Camryn Innes; Lauren Lugtigheid; Brynn Gallamore; Skylar Flanagan; Jordyn Ruppel; Chloe Bethune; CeCe Brown; Rylee Ruppel; Bella Gill; Kailey Ross; Rae Bates	Ontario; Chantal Carriere; Pyper Morley; Avyree Sherman; Natalie Merlin; Danielle Fenlong; Caitlin Colley; Chloe Hocquard; Vikkie Klimaszewski; Kaitlyn Parisi; Robyn Wood; Sierra Roy; Ella Zuchero; Jorja Sandilands; Alexa Aquanno; Serena D'Amico	Alberta; Josie Wright; Sophia Bristow; Jorja Hainsworth; Miranda Deck; Madi Hunter; Mailya Pankiw; Kamryn Lane; Karter Dougan; Katerhine Thiessen; Paige Stecyk; Brooke Cameron; Hanna Janke; Mikka Spence; Tyra Martin; Clare Sherwood

== Swimming ==
=== Male ===
Event	Gold		Silver		Bronze	
50m Freestyle	Éli Pelletier; Quebec	23.82	Gavin Schinkelshoek; Ontario	23.87	Alan Piatek; Alberta	23.95
50m Freestyle Para	Ken Stroud; British Columbia	864	Tyson Jacob; Quebec	782	George Kierstead; Ontario	775
50m Freestyle Special Olympics	Lucas Landry; Quebec	28.13	Landon Arbeau; Nova Scotia	28.39	Thomas Pelley; Newfoundland and Labrador	28.52
100m Freestyle	Gavin Schinkelshoek; Ontario	51.95	Eitan Issakov; Quebec	52.18	Éli Pelletier; Quebec	52.23
100m Freestyle Para	Ken Stroud; British Columbia	827	Charles Giammichele; Ontario	779	George Kierstead; Ontario	773
100m Freestyle Special Olympics	Lucas Landry; Quebec	1:01.86	Thomas Pelley; Newfoundland and Labrador	1:03.09	Landon Arbeau; Nova Scotia	1:03.28
200m Freestyle	Eitan Issakov; Quebec	1:54.06	Adrian Cheung; Quebec	1:54.65	Gabriel Ardeleanu; Ontario	1:54.95
400m Freestyle	Oliver Blanchard; Quebec	3:58.53	Aiden Gyorfi; Alberta	4:01.07	Gabriel Ardeleanu; Ontario	4:01.70
800m Freestyle	Oliver Blanchard; Quebec	8:14.61	Aiden Gyorfi; Alberta	8:22.06	Gabriel Ardeleanu; Ontario	8:26.57
1500m Freestyle	Oliver Blanchard; Quebec	15:54.62	Aiden Gyorfi; Alberta	16:03.62	Alexandre Lépine; Quebec	16:17.19
4 × 100 m Freestyle Relay	Quebec; Eitan Issakov; Émile Bergeron; Henri Vaillancourt; Éli Pelletier	3:26.73	British Columbia; Zac Millns; Preston Seneviratne; Alex Camaraire; Liam Chew	3:28.98	Alberta; Kingston Hitchcock; Levi Hildebrand; Alan Piatek; Aiden Gyorfi	3:29.57
4 × 200 m Freestyle Relay	Quebec; Eitan Issakov; Adrian Cheung; Alexandre Lépine; Oliver Blanchard	7:37.94	Alberta; Kingston Hitchcock; Levi Hildebrand; Maddox Oliver; Aiden Gyorfi	7:41.53	Ontario; Scott Watson; Aidan Lee; Deniz Capraz; Gabriel Ardeleanu	7:43.88
200m(S1-5,S14) / 400m(S6-13) Freestyle Para	Ken Stroud; British Columbia	825	Gavin Baggs; Newfoundland and Labrador	807	John Gillis; Ontario	748
50m Backstroke	Gavin Schinkelshoek; Ontario	26.60	Éli Pelletier; Quebec	26.80	Oliver Carpenter; Quebec	27.17
50m Backstroke Special Olympics	Landon Arbeau; Nova Scotia	34.16	Ben Pruvis; Manitoba	35.07	Ramon Siytangco; British Columbia	35.92
50m(S1-5) / 100m(S6-14) Backstroke	Leo Zheng; Saskatchewan	823	Ken Stroud; British Columbia	817	Roy Pan; British Columbia	666
100m Backstroke	Gavin Schinkelshoek; Ontario	57.05	Carson Killam; Ontario	57.87	Oliver Carpenter; Quebec	57.99
100m Backstroke Special Olympics	Landon Arbeau; Nova Scotia	1:13.75	Ramon Siytangco; British Columbia	1:14.53	Ben Purvis; Manitoba	1:19.05
200m Backstroke	Carson Killam; Ontario	2:04.11	Oliver Carpenter; Quebec	2:06.27	Gavin Schinkelshoek; Ontario	2:06.99
50m Breaststroke	Justin Léveillée; Quebec	28.96	Tazio Mastromatteo; Ontario	29.04	Zachary Newman; New Brunswick	30.36
50m Breaststroke Special Olympics	Ramon Siytangco; British Columbia	37.44	Landon Arbeau; Nova Scotia	37.55	Wesley Wilks; Alberta	38.13
50m(SB1-3)/100m(SB4-9,11-14)Breaststroke	Ken Stroud; British Columbia	831	Charles Giammichele; Ontario	765	Roy Pan; British Columbia	692
100m Breaststroke	Tazio Mastromatteo; Ontario	1:05.11	Justin Léveillée; Quebec	1:05.38	Brody MacPherson; Nova Scotia	1:05.98
200m Breaststroke	Aidan Li Ying Pin; Quebec	2:21.96	Ian Wu; Ontario	2:22.16	Yiguo Song; British Columbia	2:24.03
50m Butterfly	Addi Bailey-Ross; Manitoba	25.00	Alan Piatek; Alberta	25.29	Matthew Blackwell; Ontario	25.42
50m(S1-7) / 100m(S8-14) Butterfly Para	Étienne Boutin-Côté; Quebec	882	Ken Stroud; British Columbia	781	George Kierstead; Ontario	744
100m Butterfly	Matthew Blackwell; Ontario	55.84	Alan Piatek; Alberta	55.85	Émile Thifault; Quebec	56.19
200m Butterfly	Émile Thifault; Quebec	2:04.33	Matthew Blackwell; Ontario	2:05.00	Max Wu; British Columbia	2:05.80
150m (SM1-4) / 200m (SM5-14) IM Para	Ken Stroud; British Columbia	878	George Kierstead; Ontario	777	Charles Giammichele; Ontario	759
200 IM	Liam Chew; British Columbia	2:08.17	Aidan Ronghui Lee; Ontario	2:08.19	Kingston Hitchcock; Alberta	2:08.66
400m IM	Liam Chew; British Columbia	4:32.06	Kingston Hitchcock; Alberta	4:36.10	Aidan Ronghui Lee; Ontario	4:37.65
3000m Open Water	Oliver Blanchard; Quebec	38:04.34	Aiden Gyorfi; Alberta	38:31.03	Adrian Cheung; Quebec	38:39.89
4 × 100 m Medley Relay	Ontario; Gavin Schinkelshoek; Tazio Mastromatteo; Matthew Blackwell; Gabriel Ardeleanu	3:49.14	Quebec; Oliver Carpenter; Justin Leveillee; Henri Vaillancourt; Eitan Issakov	3:50.98	British Columbia; Colton Gonzales; Liam Chew; Preston Seneviratne; Alex Camaraire	3:52.77

=== Female ===
Event	Gold		Silver		Bronze	
50m Freestyle	Kelly Anne Choi; British Columbia	25.66	Olivia Zhou; British Columbia	26.37	Jordyn Richardson; Ontario	26.58
50m Freestyle Para	Maxine Lavitt; Manitoba	935	Sophie Wood; British Columbia	907	Alyssa Smyth; Ontario	889
50m Freestyle Special Olympics	Teagen Ann Purvis; Manitoba	33.91	Casey Kruse; Alberta	36.28	Emma Girard; Quebec	36.81
100m Freestyle	Kelly Anne Choi; British Columbia	56.75	Reilly Lefsrud; Quebec	57.08	Riley Miller; British Columbia	57.17
100m Freestyle Para	Alyssa Smyth; Ontario	931	Maxine Lavitt; Manitoba	910	Sophie Wood; British Columbia	893
100m Freestyle Special Olympics	Casey Kruse; Alberta	1:21.95	Emma Girard; Quebec	1:27.75	Ellie Hearn; Nova Scotia	1:32.11
200m Freestyle	Elleigh Wise; Alberta	2:03:37	Reilly Lefsrud; Quebec	2:04.12	Kelly Anne Choi; British Columbia	2:04.49
400m Freestyle	Paige Stepanoff; Ontario	4:19.74	Isabella Cooper; Ontario	4:19.85	Elleigh Wise; Alberta	4:20.01
800m Freestyle	Isabella Cooper; Ontario	8:55.83	Naomi Mynott; British Columbia	8:56.24	Elleigh Wise; Alberta	8:59.41
1500m Freestyle	Isabella Cooper; Ontario	16:58.19 (GR)	Elleigh Wise; Alberta	17:04.08	Naomi Mynott; British Columbia	17:15.15
4 × 100 m Freestyle Relay	British Columbia; Riley Miller; Maelle Sanborn; Kelly Choi; Olivia Zhou	3:51.53	Ontario; Chloe Walker; Jordyn Richardson; Tiffany Man; Paige Stepanoff	3:53.60	Alberta; Alexandra Rogers; Callie Cardiff; Meghan Sutherland; Elleigh Wise	3:53.61
4 × 200 m Freestyle Relay	Ontario; Ella Harrison; Chloe Walker; Kaia Hornby; Paige Stepanoff	8:20.75	British Columbia; Michelle Zeng; Kelly Choi; Yingxuan Lucy Liu; Naomi Mynott	8:22.67	Alberta; Callie Cardiff; Alexandra Rogers; Meghan Sutherland; Elleigh Wise	8:28.96
200m (S1-5,S14) / 400m (S6-13) Freestyle Para	Alyssa Smyth; Ontario	920	Mathilde Falardeau; Quebec	868	Veronica MacLellan; Prince Edward Island	789
50m Backstroke	Christine Zhou; Alberta	29.18	Aurelia Girard; Quebec	29.42	Kelly Anne Choi; British Columbia	29.83
50m Backstroke Special Olympics	Teagen Ann Purvis; Manitoba	41.28	Ellie Hearn; Nova Scotia	44.21	Case Kruse; Alberta	47.95
50m(S1-5) / 100m(S6-14) Backstroke Para	Alyssa Smyth; Ontario	940	Maxine Lavitt; Manitoba	883	Veronica MacLellan; Prince Edward Island	849
100m Backstroke	Christine Zhou; Alberta	1:02.99	Aurelia Girard; Quebec	1:04.26	Kelly Anne Choi; British Columbia	1:05.02
100m Backstroke Special Olympics	Teagen Ann Purvis; Manitoba	1:34.52	Ellie Hearn; Nova Scotia	1:39.42	Casey Kruse; Alberta	1:43.47
200m Backstroke	Ève Labrie; Quebec	2:15.68	Reilly Lefsrud; Quebec	2:19.12	Muqing (Emma) Zhang; British Columbia	2:19.16
50m Breaststroke	Maëlle Sanborn; British Columbia	32.45	Hayleigh Haines; Alberta	32.79	Alex Leno; Ontario	33.57
50m Breaststroke Special Olympics	Casey Kruse; Alberta	47.06	Teagen Ann Purvis; Manitoba	47.29	Emma Girard; Quebec	51.57
50m(SB1-3)/100m(SB4-9,11-14)Breaststroke Para	Maxine Lavitt; Manitoba	850	Mathilde Falardeau; Quebec	799	Alyssa Smyth; Ontario	733
100m Breaststroke	Maëlle Sanborn; British Columbia	1:10.78	Hayleigh Haines; Alberta	1:11.51	Douae Abetti; Quebec	1:13.03
200m Breaststroke	Maëlle Sanborn; British Columbia	2:32.45	Douae Abetti; Quebec	2:37.00	Lily Chai; Ontario	2:39.11
50m Butterfly	Olivia Zhou; British Columbia	27.45	Blakely McBride; Alberta	27.67	Emilie Golinowski; British Columbia	28.00
50m(S1-7) / 100m(S8-14) Butterfly Para	Alyssa Smyth; Ontario	928	Mathilde Falardeau; Quebec	862	Sophie Wood; British Columbia	750
100m Butterfly	Kaia Hornby; Ontario	1:03.41	Emilie Golinowski; British Columbia	1:03.56	Ella Harrison; Ontario	1:03.92
200m Butterfly	Isabella Cooper; Ontario	2:15.87	Ella Harrison; Ontario	2:19.57	Emilie Golinowski; British Columbia	2:20.02
150m (SM1-4) / 200m (SM5-14) IM	Alyssa Smyth; Ontario	915	Maxine Lavitt; Manitoba	885	Mathilde Falardeau; Quebec	834
200m IM	Kelly Anne Choi; British Columbia	2:19.88	Callie Cardiff; Alberta	2:20.43	Grier Stokley; Ontario	2:21.19
400m IM	Naomi Mynott; British Columbia	4:54.94	Isabella Cooper; Ontario	4:57.19	Lily Chai; Ontario	4:58.27
3000m Open Water	Elleigh Wise; Alberta	38:36.91	Isabella Cooper; Ontario	38:46.55	Annabelle Turcotte; Quebec	38:53.83
4 × 100 m Medley Relay	British Columbia; Olivia Zhou; Maelle Sanborn; Emilie Golnowski; Kelly Choi	4:16.48	Alberta; Christine Zhou; Hayleigh Haines; Taylor Ginther; Callie Cardiff	4:17.93	Quebec; Ève Labrie; Douae Abeti; Claudia Boily; Aurélia Girard	4:19.76

=== Mixed ===
Event	Gold		Silver		Bronze	
4 × 100 m Freestyle Relay	Ontario; Gavin Schinkelshoek; Gabriel Ardelanu; Jordyn Richardson; Chloe Walker	3:38.88	British Columbia; Zac Millns; Alex Camaraire; Kelly Choi; Riley Miller	3:39.30	Alberta; Alan Piatek; Kingston Hitchcock; Callie Cardiff; Alexandra Rogers	3:40.03
4 × 100 m Medley Relay	British Columbia; Colton Conzales; Yiguo Song; Emilie Golinowski; Kelly Choi; Ontario; Gavin Schinkelshoek; Tazio Mastromatteo; Kaia Hornby; Jordyn Richardson	4:03.27	Not awarded		Alberta; Christine Zhou; Hayleigh Haines; Alan Piatek; Kingston Hitchcock	4:05.21

== Tennis ==
Event	Gold	Silver	Bronze
Mixed team	Ontario; Josh Adamson; Benjamin Azar; Nadia Lagaev; Lily Rochon; Callum MacKinnon; Kyle McDadi; Andrea Cabio; Zoya Chulak	Quebec; Volodymyr Gurenko; Antoine Généreux; Clémence Mercier; Mirka Delaney; Alec Barin; Andy Tchinda Kepche; Neda Rahimkhani; Ève Thibault	British Columbia; Charlie Celebrini; Daniel Dong; Gary Jiang; Havana Kadi; Lilian Liu; Amy Shen; Eric Wang; Lucas Wang

== Volleyball ==
Event	Gold	Silver	Bronze
Men's Beach	British Columbia; Piers de Greeff; Noam Miller Snitz	Quebec; Louis Charbonneau; Nathan Lalumière	Ontario; Gavin Deep; Aiden Hilkowitz
Men's Volleyball	Alberta; William Brandsma; Ben Weiss; Tyson DeZutter; Corny Bergen; Elliott Rourke; Ethan Berardocco; Brayden Long; Grayson McDonald; Kai Miles; Liam Ulrich; Chris Layton; Luke Wright	Manitoba; Ethan Baraniuk; Eli Ulrich; Gavin Ulrich; Matthew Brown; Kal-El Wilson; Chris Redmann; Liam Noonan; Jackson Vandersteen; Auggy Okose; Kai Toney; Liam Mancer; Simon Oberbuchner	Ontario; Deng Yout; Parker Ocampo; Daniel Joseph Lewis; Ian McQueen; Tobias Snider; Brendan Lyons; Matthias Cooper; Marcus Barrett; Mason Lange; Justin Jamieson; Aiden Vandenheuvel; Cooper Spehr
Women's Beach	Ontario; Ofure Odigie; EJ Cudmore	Quebec; Ève Joly; Audrey-Ann Labbé	Saskatchewan; Erika Markentin; Alexa Smith
Women's Volleyball	Ontario; Kristen Huebel; Eva Génier; Roselle Mo; Alex Brenner; Sophia Phung; Natalie Anne Maria Wahlgren; Megan Hunter; Ana Stojanovic; Jasmine Chrétien; Ana Nastase; Dara Obeid; Ella Hope	Alberta; Leyton Balint; Mallory Reynolds; Kalyssa Komori; Chloe Penz; Megan Deveaux; Lola Doef; Kelsey Brumm; Brooke Fermaniuk; Madden Hansen; Nikola Gamlin; Lydia Wigston; Jenna Snyder	Saskatchewan; Olivia Orosz; Ella Grapentine; Cassidy Wallace; Hayden Kot; Aubree Sutherland; Hailey Tulik; Mairin Mackie; Reese Stroeder; Abby Wasutyk; Amanda Nagy; Quinn Smith; Brynn Delainey

== Wrestling ==
=== Men's ===
Event	Gold	Silver	Bronze
44 to 48 kg	Ricky Parra; Ontario	Gaurav Bahi; British Columbia	Jack Aucoin; Alberta
Up to 52 kg	Oscar Chin; Ontario	Nizami Gurbanzade; Quebec	Christhony Dela Cruz; British Columbia
Up to 56 kg	Aaharen Piranavan; Ontario	Gurshar Johal; British Columbia	Ryken Bottineau; Alberta
Up to 60 kg	Aiden O'Neill; Ontario	Markus Lee; British Columbia	Anes Sellami; Quebec
Up to 65 kg	Dominic Wendt; British Columbia	Dexter Bates; Ontario	Vitalie Clima; Quebec
Up to 71 kg	JJ Coles; Ontario	Illia Anoshyn; British Columbia	Darius Horvath; Manitoba
Up to 77 kg	Sasha Chupryna; British Columbia	Oleksii Dymytrov; Alberta	Jacob Kozak; Saskatchewan
Up to 85 kg	Taras Fisun; Manitoba	Attila Adamko; Ontario	Nico Papadopoulos; Quebec
Up to 92 kg	Harjot Shergill; British Columbia	Tyler Langford; Saskatchewan	AJ Campione; Quebec
Up to 100 kg	Mehar Deol; British Columbia	Jaren Alaimoana; Alberta	Othniel Kabongo; Saskatchewan
Up to 120 kg	Jagroop Dhinsa; British Columbia	Jessy Connolly; Alberta	Chase Mitchell Riley; Saskatchewan
Team	Ontario; Attila Adamko; Dexter Bates; Austin Brabant; Oscar Chin; JJ Coles; Larry Dimaria; Arkhyp Gabroshvili; Isaiah Maracle; Aiden O'Neill; Ricky Parra; Aaharen Piranavan	British Columbia; Illia Anoshyn; Manveer Bachra; Gaurav Bahi; Sasha Chupryna; Christhony Dela Cruz; Mehar Deol; Jagroop Dhinsa; Gurshar Johal; Markus Lee; Harjot Shergill; Dominic Wendt	Quebec; Farsad Alamatsaz; AJ Campione; Vitalie Clima; Grayden Diome; Nizami Gurbanzade; Sahanatie Leblanc; Nico Papadopoulos; Loïck Rainville; Ethan Rooney; Anes Sellami; Justin Swaminadhan

=== Women's ===
Event	Gold	Silver	Bronze
43 to 47 kg	Victoria Stefanov; Alberta	Lauren MacGregor; Ontario	Talia Pavlic; Manitoba
Up to 50 kg	Gurleen Dhillon; British Columbia	Emma Chartres; Ontario	Liz Chapman; Saskatchewan
Up to 53 kg	Kaura Coles; Ontario	Emma Tritton; Quebec	Tanya Dhillon; British Columbia
Up to 56 kg	Meagan Summers; Saskatchewan	Arsh Sidhu; Alberta	Myla Blackshaw; Ontario
Up to 59 kg	Kai Pare; British Columbia	Makinleigh Courtney; Ontario	Alexsa Matheson; Prince Edward Island
Up to 62 kg	Natalie Wojciechowski; British Columbia	Brooklynn Dieter; Saskatchewan	Taylor Engelen; Ontario
Up to 65 kg	Paige Veloso; Alberta	Keely MacGrath; Prince Edward Island	Kaiya Mannapso; British Columbia
Up to 69 kg	Amelia Lucas; Alberta	Khushi Jhalli; British Columbia	Charisa Okeke; Ontario
Up to 73 kg	Clara Smithanik; Alberta	Ash Booth; British Columbia	Chloe Richardson; New Brunswick
Up to 80 kg	Aniah Zedan; Ontario	Ambika Sehrawat; British Columbia	Callie Christian; Alberta
Up to 90 kg	Pepper Pepperdene; New Brunswick	Devondra Thomas; Alberta	Stacy Dustyhorn; Saskatchewan
Team	British Columbia; Ash Booth; Kylie Cameron-Pattison; Rylie Chew; Gurleen Dhillon; Tanya Dhillon; Khushi Jhalli; Kaiya Mannapso; Kai Pare; Ambika Sehrawat; Iraabir Sooch; Natalie Wojciechowski	Ontario; Myla Blackshaw; Emma Chartres; Kaura Coles; Makinleigh Courtney; Taylor Engelen; Lauren MacGregor; Annie Niemann; Charisa Okeke; Mimi Okeke; Gurjot Sidhu; Aniah Zedan	Alberta; Riley Cayer; Callie Christian; Jessica Froese; Amelia Lucas; Riley Papalia; Clara Perry; Arsh Sidhu; Clara Smithanik; Victoria Stefanov; Devondra Thomas; Paige Veloso
