= Braxton Brann =

American athlete

Personal information
- Nationality: American
- Born: 2004 (age 21–22)

Sport
- Country: United States
- Sport: Athletics
- Event: 110 m hurdles

Achievements and titles
- Personal best: 110 m hurdles: 13.07 (2026)

Braxton Brann (born 2004) is an American high hurdler.

== Biography ==
Brann attended Huron High School in Ann Arbor, Michigan, and excelled in high school in both sprints and hurdles. He won all-American honours at the 2023 New Balance Indoor Nationals in both the 60 metres hurdles and 200 metres and became the first Michigan athlete since 1895 to win both the 110 metres hurdles and 200 metres at a state meet at Rockford later that year. Brann had a second-place finish in the 110 metres hurdles at the 2023 AAU Junior Olympic Games.

A student at Ohio State University, Brann set a new school record of 13.36 seconds for the 110 m hurdles at the 2025 NCAA Regionals.

Brann won the men's 110 metres hurdles final in a wind-assisted 13.18 (+4.5 m/s) seconds at the 2026 Big Ten Outdoor Championships in Lincoln, Nebraska. Competing at the 2026 NCAA Outdoor Championships in Eugene, he placed third behind Ja'Kobe Tharp and Kendrick Smallwood in a personal best 13.07 seconds in the 110 m hurdles final. Brann placed seventh in 13.34 seconds (+1.8) at the 2026 Prefontaine Classic, part of the 2026 Diamond League.
