= Chen Yuanjiang =

Chinese athlete (born 2006)

Personal information
- Born: 27 January 2006 (age 20)

Sport
- Sport: Athletics
- Event: Hurdles

Achievements and titles
- Personal bests: 60 m hurdles 7.62 (2025); 110 m hurdles: 13.28 (2025)
Medal record
Men's athletics
Representing China
Asian Games
Gold medal – first place	2026 Nagoya	110 m hurdles
Asian Indoor Championships
Bronze medal – third place	2026 Tanjijn	60 m hurdles
World U20 Championships
Bronze medal – third place	2024 Lima	110 m hurdles
Asian U20 Championships
Silver medal – second place	2024 Dubai	110 m hurdles

Chen Yuanjiang (born 27 January 2006) is a Chinese sprint hurdler. He won the gold medal in the 110 metres hurdles at the 2026 Asian Games.

== Biography ==
Born in Jining, Shandong province, Chen moved with his parents to Ningbo, Zhejiang province, as a child. He began training in long jump and hurdles in 2017.

In 2023, he won the Chinese National Students Games over 110 metres hurdles. He was a silver medalist in the 110 metres hurdles at the 2024 Asian U20 Athletics Championships in Dubai. His time of 13.26 seconds (1.2 m/s) bettered the previous championship record as he finished 0.2 behind Qatar’s Oumar Doudai Abakar.

He won a bronze medal in the 110 metres hurdles at the 2024 World Athletics U20 Championships in Lima, Peru, in 13.21 seconds setting a new national U20 record for junior sixed hurdles, having won his senior-final in 13.38 seconds.

Competing in June 2025 in Bengbu he lowered his personal best in the 110 metres hurdles to 13.28 seconds, placing him fourth all-time in the U20 category list for the senior sized hurdles in the event, behind only his compatriot Liu Xiang (13.12 seconds), and Americans Ja'Kobe Tharp, and Renaldo Nehemiah. He was a semi-finalist competing at the 2025 World Athletics Championships in the men's 110 metres hurdles in Tokyo, Japan, in September 2025.

In February 2026, he won the bronze medal in the 60 metres hurdles at the 2026 Asian Indoor Athletics Championships in Tianjin, China. In March 2026, he was a semi-finalist over 60 metres hurdles at the 2026 World Athletics Indoor Championships. In September, he won the gold medal in the 110 metres hurdles at the 2026 Asian Games in Japan, running 13.15 seconds in the final, in wet conditions.
