= Andre Korbmacher =

American athlete (born 2005)

Personal information
- Born: 30 April 2005 (age 21)

Sport
- Sport: Athletics
- Event: Hurdles

Achievements and titles
- Personal best: 110m hurdles: 13.30 (2026)
Medal record
Men's athletics
Representing United States
World U20 Championships
Silver medal – second place	2024 Lima	110m hurdles

Andre Korbmacher (born 30 April 2005) is an American high hurdler. He was the silver medalist in the 110 metres hurdles at the 2024 World U20 Championships behind compatriot Ja'Kobe Tharp.

== Early life ==
From Bellingham, Washington, he began competing in athletics at Whatcom Middle School where he was initially a sprinter. He joined the sprint and hurdle club Ready-Set-Go Sprinters Club in Bellingham. He then attended Squalicum High School. He won the New Balance national championships over 60m hurdles in 2022. He broke the state high school 110m hurdles record four times, finishing the 2023 season with a personal best of 13.74 seconds. He then attended Florida State University.

== Career ==
In March 2024, he lowered his 110m hurdles personal best to 13.56 seconds. He finished runner-up at the USATF U20 Championships in Eugene, Oregon in June 2024, behind Ja'Kobe Tharp. He competed at the 2024 World Athletics U20 Championships in Lima, Peru, qualifying for the final as one of the fastest in the heats. In the final, he won the silver medal behind Tharp, running a personal best time of 13.14 seconds over the U20 high hurdles.

Korbmacher won the 60 metres hurdles at the Atlantic Coast Conference Indoor Championships (ACC) in March 2025, running 7.58 seconds. In May 2025, he won the 110 metres hurdles at the ACC Championships in 13.47 seconds.

At the Florida Relays in April 2026 Korbmacher won the 110 m hurdles in an equal personal best of 13.47 seconds (+0.6). On 12 June, he placed seventh in the 110 m hurdles final at the 2026 NCAA Outdoor Championships, running 13.30 seconds.
