= Athletics at the 2026 Asian Games – Men's 110 metres hurdles =

Men's 110 metres hurdles at the 2026 Asian Games
- Venue: Mizuho Park Athletic Stadium, Nagoya
- Dates: 26 September 2026 (round 1); 27 September 2026 (final)
- Competitors: 17 from 13 nations
- Winning time: 13.15

Medalists
gold medal	Chen Yuanjiang	China
silver medal	Rachid Muratake	Japan
bronze medal	John Cabang	Philippines

The men's 110 metres hurdles was held over two rounds at the 2026 Asian Games at the Mizuho Park Athletic Stadium in Nagoya, Japan on 26 and 27 September 2026.

== Schedule ==
All times are Japan Standard Time (UTC+09:00)

Schedule
Date	Time	Event
26 September 2026	17:02	Round 1
27 September 2026	17:02	Final

== Records ==
Prior to this competition, the existing world, Asian and Games records were as follows.

Record	Time	Athlete (nation)	Location	Date
World record	12.75	Ja'Kobe Tharp (USA)	Eugene, United States	10 June 2026
Asian record	12.88	Liu Xiang (CHN)	Lausanne, Switzerland	11 July 2006
Games record	13.09	Liu Xiang (CHN)	Guangzhou, China	24 November 2010

== Results ==
=== Round 1 ===
First 2 in each heat (Q) and next 2 fastest (q) advanced to the final.

==== Heat 1 ====
Place	Lane	Athlete	Nation	Time	Notes
1	4	Lin Yi-Kai	Chinese Taipei	13.82	
2	6	Ang Chen Xiang	Singapore	13.88 [.877]	
3	4	Yaqoub Al-Youha	Kuwait	13.88 [.878]	
4	5	Liu Hiu Long	Hong Kong	13.91	
—	2	Shunsuke Izumiya	Japan	DNF	
				Wind: (±0.0 m/s)	

==== Heat 2 ====
Place	Lane	Athlete	Nation	Time	Notes
1	2	Rachid Muratake	Japan	13.27	
2	4	Oumar Doudai Abakar	Qatar	13.63	
3	3	Liu Junxi	China	13.69	
4	5	Roshan Dammika Ranatungage	Sri Lanka	13.81	
5	6	Cheung Wang Fung	Hong Kong	13.88	
6	7	Deuanpheang Xayyapheat	Laos	15.50	
				Wind: (+0.1 m/s)	

==== Heat 3 ====
Place	Lane	Athlete	Nation	Time	Notes
1	6	Chen Yuanjiang	China	13.52	
2	3	John Cabang	Philippines	13.58	
3	7	Hsieh Yuan-kai	Chinese Taipei	13.60	
4	2	Mohamad Armin Zahryl	Malaysia	13.91	
5	4	David Yefremov	Kazakhstan	14.00	
6	5	Salem Bakheet	Bahrain	15.71	
				Wind: (−0.3 m/s)	

=== Final ===
Place	Lane	Athlete	Nation	Time	Notes
1st place, gold medalist(s)	7	Chen Yuanjiang	China	13.15	
2nd place, silver medalist(s)	6	Rachid Muratake	Japan	13.29	
3rd place, bronze medalist(s)	5	John Cabang	Philippines	13.48	SB
4	2	Hsieh Yuan-kai	Chinese Taipei	13.55	
5	3	Oumar Doudai Abakar	Qatar	13.67	
6	4	Lin Yi-Kai	Chinese Taipei	13.77	
7	8	Ang Chen Xiang	Singapore	13.90	
—	9	Liu Junxi	China	DNF	
				Wind: (+0.8 m/s)	
