= Kendrick Smallwood =

American hurdler (born 2004)

Personal information
- Born: 7 April 2004 (age 22)

Sport
- Sport: Athletics
- Event: Hurdles

Achievements and titles
- Personal bests: 110mH: 12.95 (2026); 60mH: 7.46 (2026)

Kendrick Smallwood (born 7 April 2004) is an American high hurdler.

== Biography ==
From Texas, Smallwood started in athletics at Dallas Track Club. Despite his diminutive stature he excelled in hurdles, and won the UIL Class 5A boys 110 metres hurdles in a wind-assisted time of 13.47 seconds in 2021. The following year, he broke the UIL Class 5A Region II track and field meet record in the 110m hurdles that had previously belonged to Robert Griffin III. He attended Poteet High School before attending The University of Texas at Austin.

Smallwood won the 2025 SEC Conference title in the men's 110m hurdles in a time of 13.13 seconds in Lexington, Kentucky. He was a finalist in the 110 metres hurdles at the 2025 NCAA Championships, winning his semi-final heat in 13.25 seconds.

Smallwood placed fourth of 60m hurdles at the 2026 NCAA Division I Indoor Track and Field Championships.

He ran a personal best 13.04 seconds for the 110 metres hurdles in 2026 at the West Regional NCAA Championships to move into the top-five of the NCAA all-time list. Competing at the 2026 NCAA Outdoor Championships in Eugene, Smallwood placed second to Ja'Kobe Tharp in 12.95 seconds in the 110 m hurdles, to move to second on the NCAA all-time list behind Tharp. Smallwood made his debut in the 2026 Diamond League, winning his preliminary heat in 13.09 seconds on 28 June at the 2026 Meeting de Paris, prior to placing eighth overall. On 26 July, Smallwood placed third in the 110 m hurdles at the 2026 USA Outdoor Track and Field Championships in New York, finishing behind Cordell Tinch and Bradley Franklin, in 13.11 seconds.
