= 2026 Prefontaine Classic =

Athletics meeting in Eugene, United States

- Dates: 3-4 July 2026
- Host city: Eugene, Oregon, United States
- Venue: Hayward Field
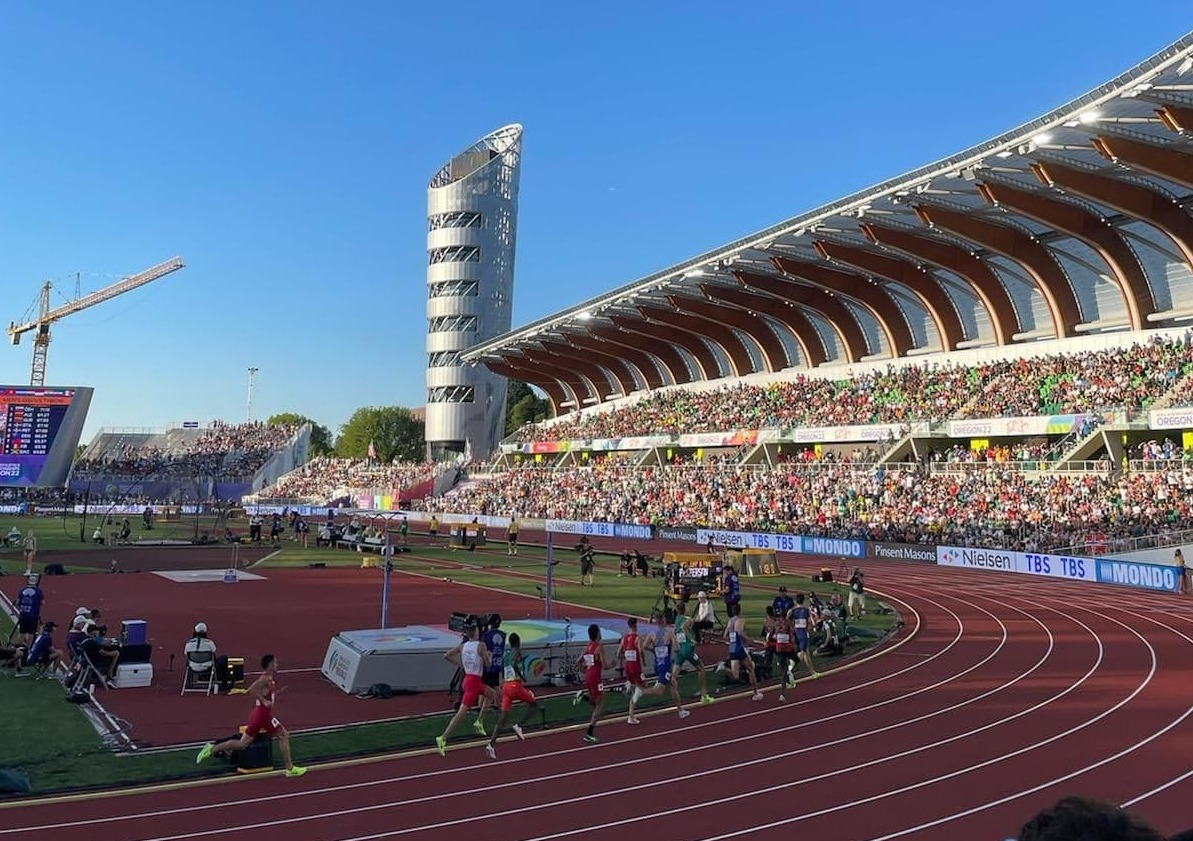
- Level: 2026 Diamond League

The 2026 Prefontaine Classic was the 51st edition of the annual outdoor track and field meeting in Eugene, Oregon, United States. Held on 3–4 July at Hayward Field, it was the 9th leg of the 2026 Diamond League – the highest-level international track and field circuit.

== Diamond+ events results ==
=== Men's ===
400 Metres
| Place | Athlete | Nation | Time | Points | Notes |
|---|---|---|---|---|---|
| 1st place, gold medalist(s) | Collen Kebinatshipi | Botswana | 44.00 | 8 | |
| 2nd place, silver medalist(s) | Rai Benjamin | United States | 44.11 | 7 | PB |
| 3rd place, bronze medalist(s) | Christopher Bailey | United States | 44.58 | 6 | |
| 4 | Jacory Patterson | United States | 44.88 [.873] | 5 | |
| 5 | Chris Robinson | United States | 44.88 [.879] | 4 | SB |
| 6 | Khaleb McRae | United States | 44.91 | 3 | |
| 7 | Vernon Norwood | United States | 44.92 | 2 | |
| 8 | Ezekiel Nathaniel | Nigeria | 45.32 | 1 | SB |
| 9 | Michael Norman | United States | 45.47 | | |

Mile
| Place | Athlete | Nation | Time | Points | Notes |
|---|---|---|---|---|---|
| 1st place, gold medalist(s) | Cameron Myers | Australia | 3:46.06 | 8 | AR |
| 2nd place, silver medalist(s) | Yared Nuguse | United States | 3:46.61 | 7 | SB |
| 3rd place, bronze medalist(s) | Ethan Strand | United States | 3:46.97 | 6 | PB |
| 4 | Hobbs Kessler | United States | 3:47.38 | 5 | PB |
| 5 | Timothy Cheruiyot | Kenya | 3:47.39 | 4 | PB |
| 6 | Cole Hocker | United States | 3:47.57 | 3 | |
| 7 | Robert Farken | Germany | 3:47.76 | 2 | NR |
| 8 | Vincent Ciattei | United States | 3:48.34 | 1 | PB |
| 9 | Azeddine Habz | France | 3:48.43 | | SB |
| 10 | Gary Martin | United States | 3:48.76 | | PB |
| 11 | Reynold Cheruiyot | Kenya | 3:51.31 | | |
| 12 | Colin Sahlman | United States | 3:57.13 | | |
| — | Abraham Alvarado | Mexico | DNF | | PM |

110 Metres hurdles
| Place | Athlete | Nation | Time | Points | Notes |
|---|---|---|---|---|---|
| 1st place, gold medalist(s) | Jamal Britt | United States | 12.86 | 8 | MR, PB |
| 2nd place, silver medalist(s) | Ja'Kobe Tharp | United States | 12.91 | 7 | |
| 3rd place, bronze medalist(s) | Demario Prince | Jamaica | 13.01 | 6 | PB |
| 4 | Cordell Tinch | United States | 13.07 | 5 | SB |
| 5 | Orlando Bennett | Jamaica | 13.15 | 4 | SB |
| 6 | Jamar Marshall | United States | 13.24 | 3 | |
| 7 | Braxton Brann | United States | 13.34 | 2 | |
| 8 | Eric Edwards Jr. | United States | 13.43 | 1 | |
| 9 | Dylan Beard | United States | 13.53 | | |
| | | | Wind: (+ 1.8 m/s) | | |

Shot put
| Place | Athlete | Nation | Distance | Points | Notes |
|---|---|---|---|---|---|
| 1st place, gold medalist(s) | Leonardo Fabbri | Italy | 22.74 m | 8 | WL |
| 2nd place, silver medalist(s) | Rajindra Campbell | Jamaica | 22.16 m | 7 | |
| 3rd place, bronze medalist(s) | Jordan Geist | United States | 21.98 m | 6 | |
| 4 | Adrian Piperi | United States | 21.70 m | 5 | SB |
| 5 | Roger Steen | United States | 21.58 m | 4 | |
| 6 | Chukwuebuka Enekwechi | Nigeria | 21.36 m | 3 | |
| 7 | Tom Walsh | New Zealand | 21.12 m | 2 | |
| 8 | Joe Kovacs | United States | 21.05 m | 1 | |
| 9 | Payton Otterdahl | United States | 20.55 m | | |
| 10 | Uziel Muñoz | Mexico | 20.31 m | | |
| 11 | Konrad Bukowiecki | Poland | 20.13 m | | |

=== Women's ===
100 Metres - Heats
| Place | Athlete | Nation | Time | Notes |
Heat 1
| 1 | Adaejah Hodge | British Virgin Islands | 10.82 | Q |
| 2 | Sha'Carri Richardson | United States | 10.83 | Q |
| 3 | Jonielle Smith | Jamaica | 11.02 | Q |
| 4 | Shawnti Jackson | United States | 11.06 [.051] | Q |
| 5 | Tina Clayton | Jamaica | 11.06 [.058] | q |
| 6 | Amy Hunt | Great Britain | 11.10 | |
| 7 | Kayla White | United States | 11.11 | |
| 8 | Gémima Joseph | France | 11.31 [.301] | |
| 9 | Celera Barnes | United States | 11.31 [.305] | |
| | | | Wind: (−0.2 m/s) | |
Heat 2
| 1 | Melissa Jefferson-Wooden | United States | 10.95 | Q |
| 2 | Shericka Jackson | Jamaica | 11.06 | Q |
| 3 | Favour Ofili | Nigeria | 11.10 | Q, SB |
| 4 | Dina Asher-Smith | Great Britain | 11.13 | Q, =SB |
| 5 | Tia Clayton | Jamaica | 11.14 | |
| 6 | Jassani Carter | United States | 11.21 | |
| 7 | Tamari Davis | United States | 11.23 | |
| 8 | Jenna Prandini | United States | 11.26 | |
| 9 | Cambrea Sturgis | United States | 11.29 | |
| | | | Wind: (−0.8 m/s) | |

100 Metres
| Place | Athlete | Nation | Time | Points | Notes |
|---|---|---|---|---|---|
| 1st place, gold medalist(s) | Melissa Jefferson-Wooden | United States | 10.78 | 8 | SB |
| 2nd place, silver medalist(s) | Sha'Carri Richardson | United States | 10.79 | 7 | |
| 3rd place, bronze medalist(s) | Adaejah Hodge | British Virgin Islands | 10.80 | 6 | |
| 4 | Jonielle Smith | Jamaica | 10.89 | 5 | PB |
| 5 | Tina Clayton | Jamaica | 11.00 | 4 | |
| 6 | Shericka Jackson | Jamaica | 11.02 [.013] | 3 | |
| 7 | Shawnti Jackson | United States | 11.02 [.015] | 2 | |
| 8 | Favour Ofili | Nigeria | 11.07 | 1 | SB |
| 9 | Dina Asher-Smith | Great Britain | 11.18 | | |
| | | | Wind: (± 0.0 m/s) | | |

800 Metres
| Place | Athlete | Nation | Time | Points | Notes |
|---|---|---|---|---|---|
| 1st place, gold medalist(s) | Lilian Odira | Kenya | 1:56.19 | 8 | SB |
| 2nd place, silver medalist(s) | Keely Hodgkinson | Great Britain | 1:56.73 | 7 | |
| 3rd place, bronze medalist(s) | Addison Wiley | United States | 1:57.70 | 6 | SB |
| 4 | Sanu Jallow-Lockhart | Gambia | 1:58.12 | 5 | |
| 5 | Raevyn Rogers | United States | 1:58.21 | 4 | |
| 6 | Anaïs Bourgoin | France | 1:58.66 | 3 | |
| 7 | Prudence Sekgodiso | South Africa | 1:58.79 | 2 | |
| 8 | Halimah Nakaayi | Uganda | 1:59.37 | 1 | |
| 9 | Hayley Kitching | Australia | 1:59.56 | | |
| — | Paris Peoples | United States | DNF | | PM |

Mile
| Place | Athlete | Nation | Time | Points | Notes |
|---|---|---|---|---|---|
| 1st place, gold medalist(s) | Nikki Hiltz | United States | 4:17.49 | 8 | WL |
| 2nd place, silver medalist(s) | Dorcus Ewoi | Kenya | 4:17.62 | 7 | PB |
| 3rd place, bronze medalist(s) | Faith Kipyegon | Kenya | 4:17.80 | 6 | |
| 4 | Klaudia Kazimierska | Poland | 4:17.90 | 5 | NR |
| 5 | Jessica Hull | Australia | 4:18.03 | 4 | |
| 6 | Emily Mackay | United States | 4:18.18 | 3 | PB |
| 7 | Sarah Healy | Ireland | 4:18.49 | 2 | |
| 8 | Georgia Hunter Bell | Great Britain | 4:18.52 | 1 | PB |
| 9 | Gabija Galvydytė | Lithuania | 4:21.43 | | PB |
| 10 | Laura Muir | Great Britain | 4:22.31 | | SB |
| 11 | Saron Berhe | Ethiopia | 4:22.50 | | |
| 12 | Heather MacLean | United States | 4:26.13 | | |
| 13 | Worknesh Mesele | Ethiopia | 4:36.80 | | |
| — | Taryn Parks | United States | DNF | | PM |

Long jump
| Place | Athlete | Nation | Distance | Points | Notes |
|---|---|---|---|---|---|
| 1st place, gold medalist(s) | Tara Davis-Woodhall | United States | 7.13 m (+ 0.8 m/s) | 8 | |
| 2nd place, silver medalist(s) | Larissa Iapichino | Italy | 7.12 m (+ 1.8 m/s) | 7 | NR |
| 3rd place, bronze medalist(s) | Monae' Nichols | United States | 7.05 m (+ 3.0 m/s) | 6 | |
| 4 | Alyssa Jones | United States | 6.99 m (+ 1.6 m/s) | 5 | |
| 5 | Malaika Mihambo | Germany | 6.92 m (+ 1.9 m/s) | 4 | SB |
| 6 | Maja Åskag | Sweden | 6.80 m (−1.0 m/s) | 3 | PB |
| 7 | Hilary Kpatcha | France | 6.74 m (+ 1.6 m/s) | 2 | SB |
| 8 | Alexis Brown | United States | 6.61 m (+ 0.8 m/s) | 1 | |
| 9 | Claire Bryant | United States | 6.58 m (−0.4 m/s) | | |

== Diamond events results ==
=== Men's ===
200 Metres
| Place | Athlete | Nation | Time | Points | Notes |
|---|---|---|---|---|---|
| 1st place, gold medalist(s) | Tate Taylor | United States | 19.75 | 8 | PB |
| 2nd place, silver medalist(s) | Letsile Tebogo | Botswana | 19.93 | 7 | |
| 3rd place, bronze medalist(s) | Makanakaishe Charamba | Zimbabwe | 20.11 | 6 | |
| 4 | Courtney Lindsey | United States | 20.19 | 5 | SB |
| 5 | Bryan Levell | Jamaica | 20.20 | 4 | |
| 6 | Zharnel Hughes | Great Britain | 20.26 | 3 | |
| 7 | Sam Blaskowski | United States | 20.32 | 2 | |
| 8 | José Figueroa | Puerto Rico | 20.34 | 1 | |
| 9 | Adrian Kerr | Jamaica | 20.78 | | |
| | | | Wind: (−0.9 m/s) | | |

Discus throw
| Place | Athlete | Nation | Distance | Points | Notes |
|---|---|---|---|---|---|
| 1st place, gold medalist(s) | Mykolas Alekna | Lithuania | 71.06 m | 8 | SB |
| 2nd place, silver medalist(s) | Kristjan Čeh | Slovenia | 69.94 m | 7 | |
| 3rd place, bronze medalist(s) | Rojé Stona | Jamaica | 67.42 m | 6 | |
| 4 | Matthew Denny | Australia | 66.26 m | 5 | |
| 5 | Alex Rose | Samoa | 65.86 m | 4 | |
| 6 | Daniel Ståhl | Sweden | 65.46 m | 3 | |
| 7 | Lawrence Okoye | Great Britain | 65.25 m | 2 | |
| 8 | Ralford Mullings | Jamaica | 64.94 m | 1 | |
| 9 | Sam Mattis | United States | 63.31 m | | |
| 10 | Reginald Jagers III | United States | 62.72 m | | |

=== Women's ===
2 Miles
| Place | Athlete | Nation | Time | Points | Notes |
|---|---|---|---|---|---|
| 1st place, gold medalist(s) | Aleshign Baweke | Ethiopia | 9:20.02 | 8 | WL |
| 2nd place, silver medalist(s) | Hirut Meshesha | Ethiopia | 9:20.20 | 7 | |
| 3rd place, bronze medalist(s) | Shelby Houlihan | United States | 9:21.42 [.413] | 6 | |
| 4 | Marta Alemayo | Ethiopia | 9:21.42 [.420] | 5 | |
| 5 | Margot Appleton | United States | 9:22.52 | 4 | |
| 6 | Karissa Schweizer | United States | 9:22.79 | 3 | |
| 7 | Yenawa Nbret | Ethiopia | 9:22.93 | 2 | |
| 8 | Asayech Ayichew | Ethiopia | 9:23.04 | 1 | |
| 9 | Elise Stearns | United States | 9:24.24 | | |
| 10 | Gabriela DeBues-Stafford | Canada | 9:28.76 | | |
| 11 | Ella Donaghu | United States | 9:44.15 | | |
| — | Mia Barnett | Sweden | DNF | | PM |

100 Metres hurdles
| Place | Athlete | Nation | Time | Points | Notes |
|---|---|---|---|---|---|
| 1st place, gold medalist(s) | Masai Russell | United States | 12.24 | 8 | =MR |
| 2nd place, silver medalist(s) | Tobi Amusan | Nigeria | 12.34 | 7 | |
| 3rd place, bronze medalist(s) | Devynne Charlton | Bahamas | 12.41 [.404] | 6 | |
| 3rd place, bronze medalist(s) | Grace Stark | United States | 12.41 [.404] | 6 | |
| 5 | Danielle Williams | Jamaica | 12.51 | 4 | SB |
| 6 | Ackera Nugent | Jamaica | 12.63 | 3 | |
| 7 | Tonea Marshall | United States | 12.65 | 2 | SB |
| 8 | Kendra Harrison | United States | 12.66 | 1 | |
| 9 | Alaysha Johnson | United States | 12.86 | | |
| | | | Wind: (+ 0.8 m/s) | | |

3000 Metres steeplechase
| Place | Athlete | Nation | Time | Points | Notes |
|---|---|---|---|---|---|
| 1st place, gold medalist(s) | Faith Cherotich | Kenya | 8:51.74 | 8 | |
| 2nd place, silver medalist(s) | Winfred Yavi | Bahrain | 8:52.84 | 7 | |
| 3rd place, bronze medalist(s) | Marwa Bouzayani | Tunisia | 8:54.32 | 6 | NR |
| 4 | Doris Lemngole | Kenya | 8:57.89 | 5 | PB |
| 5 | Peruth Chemutai | Uganda | 9:05.39 | 4 | |
| 6 | Gesa Felicitas Krause | Germany | 9:07.50 | 3 | |
| 7 | Lea Meyer | Germany | 9:09.13 | 2 | PB |
| 8 | Lexy Halladay-Lowry | United States | 9:13.33 | 1 | SB |
| 9 | Emma Coburn | United States | 9:15.97 | | SB |
| 10 | Gabrielle Jennings | United States | 9:18.12 | | |
| 11 | Angelina Napoleon | United States | 9:19.41 | | SB |
| 12 | Angelina Ellis | United States | 9:20.30 | | PB |
| 13 | Courtney Wayment | United States | 9:20.90 | | SB |
| 14 | Gracie Hyde | United States | 9:25.19 | | |
| 15 | Olivia Markezich | United States | 9:32.13 | | |
| — | Norah Jeruto | Kazakhstan | DNF | | |
| — | Taylor Lovell | United States | DNF | | PM |

Shot put
| Place | Athlete | Nation | Distance | Points | Notes |
|---|---|---|---|---|---|
| 1st place, gold medalist(s) | Chase Jackson | United States | 20.56 m | 8 | |
| 2nd place, silver medalist(s) | Jessica Schilder | Netherlands | 20.11 m | 7 | |
| 3rd place, bronze medalist(s) | Fanny Roos | Sweden | 19.70 m | 6 | PB |
| 4 | Sarah Mitton | Canada | 19.61 m | 5 | |
| 5 | Yemisi Mabry | Germany | 19.14 m | 4 | |
| 6 | Jorinde van Klinken | Netherlands | 19.06 m | 3 | |
| 7 | Axelina Johansson | Sweden | 18.84 m | 2 | |
| 8 | Jaida Ross | United States | 18.74 m | 1 | |
| 9 | Maggie Ewen | United States | 18.47 m | | |
| 10 | Maddi Wesche | New Zealand | 17.71 m | | SB |

== Promotional events results ==
=== Men's ===
100 Metres
| Place | Athlete | Nation | Time | Notes |
|---|---|---|---|---|
| 1st place, gold medalist(s) | Kanyinsola Ajayi | Nigeria | 9.84 | =NR |
| 2nd place, silver medalist(s) | Oblique Seville | Jamaica | 9.89 | |
| 3rd place, bronze medalist(s) | Christian Coleman | United States | 9.95 | SB |
| 4 | Kenny Bednarek | United States | 9.96 | SB |
| 5 | Ackeem Blake | Jamaica | 10.06 | |
| 6 | Lachlan Kennedy | Australia | 10.09 | |
| 7 | Abdul-Rasheed Saminu | Ghana | 10.15 | SB |
| 8 | Brandon Hicklin | United States | 10.17 | |
| 9 | Joseph Amoah | Ghana | 10.19 | |
| | | | Wind: (+ 0.1 m/s) | |

800 Metres
| Place | Athlete | Nation | Time | Notes |
|---|---|---|---|---|
| 1st place, gold medalist(s) | Brandon Miller | United States | 1:43.68 | SB |
| 2nd place, silver medalist(s) | Cooper Lutkenhaus | United States | 1:44.62 | |
| 3rd place, bronze medalist(s) | Donavan Brazier | United States | 1:44.86 | |
| 4 | Bryce Hoppel | United States | 1:45.05 | |
| 5 | Eliott Crestan | Belgium | 1:45.11 | |
| 6 | Daniel Williams | Australia | 1:45.42 | |
| 7 | Yanis Meziane | France | 1:45.66 | |
| 8 | Tshepiso Masalela | Botswana | 1:45.70 | |
| 9 | Noah Kibet | Kenya | 1:46.10 | |
| 10 | Yusuf Bizimana | Great Britain | 1:46.37 | |
| — | Lloyd Frilot | United States | DNF | PM |

Mile
| Place | Athlete | Nation | Time | Notes |
|---|---|---|---|---|
| 1st place, gold medalist(s) | Liam Murphy | United States | 3:50.49 | PB |
| 2nd place, silver medalist(s) | Stefan Nillessen | Netherlands | 3:50.50 | |
| 3rd place, bronze medalist(s) | Abel Teffra | United States | 3:51.13 | PB |
| 4 | Davis Bove | United States | 3:51.42 | PB |
| 5 | Festus Lagat | Kenya | 3:51.44 | |
| 6 | Trent McFarland | United States | 3:52.21 | PB |
| 7 | Abraham Alvarado | Mexico | 3:52.30 | NR |
| 8 | Carter Cutting | United States | 3:53.07 | PB |
| 9 | Nick Plant | United States | 3:53.13 | PB |
| 10 | Wes Porter | United States | 3:53.57 | |
| 11 | Olli Hoare | Australia | 3:55.35 | |
| 12 | Elliott Cook | United States | 3:56.16 | PB |
| 13 | Jackson Spencer | United States | 3:57.34 | |
| 14 | Luke Houser | United States | 3:59.49 | |
| — | Shane Streich | United States | DNF | PM |

2 Miles
| Place | Athlete | Nation | Time | Notes |
|---|---|---|---|---|
| 1st place, gold medalist(s) | Parker Wolfe | United States | 8:10.13 | |
| 2nd place, silver medalist(s) | Mohamed Abdilaahi | Germany | 8:10.34 | PB |
| 3rd place, bronze medalist(s) | Grant Fisher | United States | 8:10.96 | |
| 4 | Andreas Almgren | Sweden | 8:11.12 | |
| 5 | Thomas Ratcliffe | United States | 8:11.68 | PB |
| 6 | Cooper Teare | United States | 8:12.00 | |
| 7 | Ky Robinson | Australia | 8:12.16 | |
| 8 | Morgan Beadlescomb | United States | 8:12.24 | |
| 9 | Tshepo Tshite | South Africa | 8:12.94 | |
| 10 | Dylan Jacobs | United States | 8:13.37 | |
| 11 | Abdihamid Nur | United States | 8:13.44 | |
| 12 | Eduardo Herrera | Mexico | 8:13.72 | PB |
| 13 | Mezgebu Sime | Ethiopia | 8:14.12 | |
| 14 | Marco Langon | United States | 8:14.32 | PB |
| 15 | Mike Foppen | Netherlands | 8:14.81 | |
| 16 | Santiago Catrofe | Uruguay | 8:18.09 | AR |
| 17 | Mohammed Ahmed | Canada | 8:26.44 | |
| 18 | Keita Satoh | Japan | 8:27.79 | |
| 19 | Sam Gilman | United States | 8:32.72 | |
| — | Benjámin Balázs | United States | DNF | PM |
| — | Jeffery Rogers | United States | DNF | PM |

Hammer throw
| Place | Athlete | Nation | Distance | Notes |
|---|---|---|---|---|
| 1st place, gold medalist(s) | Ethan Katzberg | Canada | 83.33 m | DLR, MR, WL |
| 2nd place, silver medalist(s) | Rudy Winkler | United States | 81.12 m | SB |
| 3rd place, bronze medalist(s) | Merlin Hummel | Germany | 79.01 m | |
| 4 | Mykhaylo Kokhan | Ukraine | 78.95 m | |
| 5 | Trey Knight | United States | 76.48 m | |
| 6 | Rowan Hamilton | Canada | 75.63 m | |
| 7 | Daniel Haugh | United States | 72.39 m | |
| 8 | Denzel Comenentia | Netherlands | 72.10 m | |

=== Women's ===
400 Metres
| Place | Athlete | Nation | Time | Notes |
|---|---|---|---|---|
| 1st place, gold medalist(s) | Dejanea Oakley | Jamaica | 49.64 | |
| 2nd place, silver medalist(s) | Aaliyah Butler | United States | 49.97 | |
| 3rd place, bronze medalist(s) | Stacey-Ann Williams | Jamaica | 50.12 | |
| 4 | Alexis Holmes | United States | 50.36 | SB |
| 5 | Ella Onojuvwevwo | Nigeria | 50.67 | |
| 6 | Martina Weil | Chile | 50.75 | SB |
| 7 | Sanaria Butler | United States | 51.65 | |
| 8 | Bailey Lear | United States | 51.99 | |
| 9 | Rhasidat Adeleke | Ireland | 52.26 | |

1500 Metres
| Place | Athlete | Nation | Time | Notes |
|---|---|---|---|---|
| 1st place, gold medalist(s) | Wilma Nielsen | Sweden | 4:05.60 | SB |
| 2nd place, silver medalist(s) | Juliette Whittaker | United States | 4:05.78 | PB |
| 3rd place, bronze medalist(s) | Lindsey Butler | United States | 4:06.46 | |
| 4 | Gaia Sabbatini | Italy | 4:06.55 | |
| 5 | Marta Zenoni | Italy | 4:06.75 | |
| 6 | Annika Reiss | United States | 4:06.89 | PB |
| 7 | Salma Elbadra | Morocco | 4:06.97 | |
| 8 | Ellery Lincoln | United States | 4:07.06 | PB |
| 9 | Lucia Stafford | Canada | 4:07.14 | |
| 10 | Mia Barnett | Sweden | 4:07.26 | |
| 11 | Carlee Hansen | United States | 4:08.09 | |
| 12 | Sadie Engelhardt | United States | 4:08.10 | |
| 13 | Gracie Morris | United States | 4:08.50 | |
| 14 | Sadie Sargent | United States | 4:09.58 | SB |
| 15 | Christina Aragon | United States | 4:11.38 | |
| — | Maddy Mooney | Ireland | DNF | PM |

Pole vault
| Place | Athlete | Nation | Height | Notes |
|---|---|---|---|---|
| 1st place, gold medalist(s) | Sandi Morris | United States | 4.85 m | SB |
| 2nd place, silver medalist(s) | Katie Moon | United States | 4.80 m | SB |
| 3rd place, bronze medalist(s) | Gabriela Leon | United States | 4.70 m | |
| 4 | Emily Grove | United States | 4.70 m | SB |
| 4 | Hana Moll | United States | 4.70 m | |
| 6 | Amanda Moll | United States | 4.60 m | |
| 6 | Chloe Timberg | United States | 4.60 m | |
| 8 | Brynn King | United States | 4.60 m | |
| 9 | Marie-Julie Bonnin | France | 4.50 m | =SB |

Discus throw
| Place | Athlete | Nation | Distance | Notes |
|---|---|---|---|---|
| 1st place, gold medalist(s) | Valarie Sion | United States | 68.64 m | |
| 2nd place, silver medalist(s) | Jorinde van Klinken | Netherlands | 68.21 m | |
| 3rd place, bronze medalist(s) | Alida van Daalen | Netherlands | 65.02 m | |
| 4 | Laulauga Tausaga | United States | 62.39 m | |
| 5 | Erika Beistle | United States | 61.32 m | |
| 6 | Jayden Ulrich | United States | 61.21 m | |
| 7 | Gabi Jacobs | United States | 58.95 m | |
| — | Cierra Jackson | United States | NM | |

Hammer throw
| Place | Athlete | Nation | Distance | Notes |
|---|---|---|---|---|
| 1st place, gold medalist(s) | Zhang Jiale | China | 77.94 m | PB |
| 2nd place, silver medalist(s) | Camryn Rogers | Canada | 77.81 m | |
| 3rd place, bronze medalist(s) | DeAnna Price | United States | 76.95 m | |
| 4 | Rachel Richeson | United States | 76.18 m | |
| 5 | Zhao Jie | China | 75.63 m | |
| 6 | Annette Echikunwoke | United States | 74.47 m | |
| 7 | Anita Wlodarczyk | Poland | 73.20 m | SB |
| 8 | Erin Reese | United States | 71.65 m | |
| 9 | Janee' Kassanavoid | United States | 70.65 m | SB |

== See also ==
- 2026 Diamond League
