= Trey Knight =

American hammer thrower (born 2002)

Personal information
- Born: 24 May 2002 (age 24)

Sport
- Sport: Athletics
- Event: Hammer throw

Achievements and titles
- Personal best: Hammer:: 79.33 m (2026)

Trey Knight (born 24 May 2002) is an American hammer thrower. He finished in second place at the 2025 USA Track and Field Championships and had a top-ten finish at the 2025 World Championships.

== Early life ==
From Ridgefield, Washington, he is from a family of throwers, with his grandfather, John Gambill, a volunteer coach for his local high school team. He attended Ridgefield High School (Washington). Knight set a national high school record in the hammer throw in 2020 and was named Washington State Athlete of the Year for boys track and field in three consecutive years.

== Career ==
Competing for California State University, Northridge, Knight named the NCAA Division I West Region indoor field athlete of the year in 2025. Earlier, he had competed for the USC Trojans track and field team.

He was fouled out at the NCAA West Outdoor regionals in 2025 and so did not qualify for the 2025 NCAA Outdoor Championships. However, he did go on to throw a personal best 78.15 metres at the Portland Track Festival in June 2025.

He placed second with a new personal best of 78.76 metres at the 2025 USA Track and Field Championships. In September 2025, he competed in the hammer throw at the 2025 World Championships in Tokyo, Japan, qualifying for the final and placing tenth overall.

On 28 March 2026, he placed second behind Rudy Winkler in the hammer throw at the USATF Winter Long Throws National Championship in Arizona with a personal best throw of 79.33 metres. In July, Knight placed fifth in the hammer throw at the 2026 Prefontaine Classic. On 23 July 2026, competing in the hammer throw at the 2026 USA Outdoor Track and Field Championships in New York, he finished third overall.
