= 2026 World Athletics Ultimate Championship – Men's 110 metres hurdles =

Men's 110 metres hurdles at the 2026 World Athletics Ultimate Championship
- Venue: National Athletics Centre
- Location: Budapest, Hungary
- Dates: 11 September 2026 (semi-finals & final)
- Competitors: 16 from 7 nations
- Winning time: 12.94 s

Champion
- Ja'Kobe Tharp; United States

The men's 110 metres hurdles was held over two rounds at the 2026 World Athletics Ultimate Championship at the National Athletics Centre in Budapest, Hungary on 11 September 2026. It was the first time the World Ultimate Championship is held. Athletes qualified by wildcard or by their world ranking.

== Background ==
Global records before the 2026 World Athletics Ultimate Championship
Record	Time	Athlete (nation)	Location	Date
World record	12.75	Ja'Kobe Tharp (USA)	Eugene, United States	10 June 2026
World lead	12.75	Ja'Kobe Tharp (USA)	Eugene, United States	10 June 2026

Area records before the 2026 World Athletics Ultimate Championship
Record	Time	Athlete (nation)	Location	Date
African record	13.11	Antonio Alkana (RSA)	Prague, Czech Republic	5 June 2017
Asian record	12.88	Liu Xiang (CHN)	Lausanne, Switzerland	11 July 2006
European record	12.91	Colin Jackson (GBR)	Stuttgart, Germany	20 August 1993
North, Central American, and Caribbean record	12.75	Ja'Kobe Tharp (USA)	Eugene, United States	10 June 2026
Oceanian record	13.29	Kyle Vander-Kuyp (AUS)	Gothenburg, Sweden	11 August 1995
South American record	13.17	Rafael Pereira (BRA)	Rio de Janeiro, Brazil	23 June 2022

== Qualification ==
For the 110 metres hurdles, sixteen athletes qualified, up to three by wildcard for winners of the event at the 2024 Summer Olympic, the 2025 World Athletics Championships, or the 2026 Diamond League final and the others by their position at the World Athletics Rankings for the event on 3 September 2026.

== Results ==
=== Semi-finals ===
The semi-finals were held on 11 September at 20:21 (UTC+2). First 4 of each heat (Q) qualified to the final.

==== Heat 1 ====
Place	Lane	Athlete	Nation	Time	Notes
1	4	Trey Cunningham	United States	13.18	Q
2	8	Jason Joseph	Switzerland	13.26	Q
3	6	Ja'Kobe Tharp	United States	13.27	Q
4	2	Tatsuki Abe	Japan	13.28	Q
5	7	Orlando Bennett	Jamaica	13.29	
6	3	Jakub Szymański	Poland	13.44	
7	5	Demario Prince	Jamaica	13.50	
8	9	Jamar Marshall	United States	13.54	
				Wind: (+0.7 m/s)	

==== Heat 2 ====
Place	Lane	Athlete	Nation	Time	Notes
1	9	Bradley Franklin	United States	12.99	Q, PB
2	4	Jamal Britt	United States	13.05	Q
3	7	Cordell Tinch	United States	13.14	Q
4	5	Rachid Muratake	Japan	13.31	Q
5	3	Just Kwaou-Mathey	France	13.33	
6	6	Enrique Llopis	Spain	13.37	
7	2	Tyler Mason	Jamaica	13.46	
8	8	Shunsuke Izumiya	Japan	13.85	
				Wind: (+0.6 m/s)	

=== Final ===
The final was held on 11 September at 21:49 (UTC+2).

Place	Lane	Athlete	Nation	Time	Notes
1st place, gold medalist(s)	8	Ja'Kobe Tharp	United States	12.94	
2	3	Cordell Tinch	United States	12.95	SB
3	4	Bradley Franklin	United States	13.01	
4	7	Trey Cunningham	United States	13.08	
5	2	Tatsuki Abe	Japan	13.24	
6	9	Rachid Muratake	Japan	13.71	
—	5	Jamal Britt	United States	DQ	TR22.6.2
—	6	Jason Joseph	Switzerland	DQ	TR16.8
				Wind: (−0.6 m/s)	
