= Tyrell Davis (sprinter) =

Canadian sprinter (born 2004)

Personal information
- Born: 8 November 2004 (age 21)

Sport
- Sport: Athletics
- Event: Sprint

Achievements and titles
- Personal best(s): 60m: 6.59 (2026); 100m: 10.50 (2025); 200m: 21.78 (2025)

Tyrell Davis (born 8 November 2004) is a Canadian sprinter. He was the 2026 U Sports indoor champion over 60 metres and was selected to represent Canada at the 2026 World Athletics Indoor Championships.

== Biography ==
From Winnipeg, Davis won the silver medal over 60 metres at the 2024 U Sports Indoor Championship the Bisons men’s team took second overall at U Sports. He finished fourth at the event in 2025 competing for the University of Manitoba. Also in 2025, Davis broke the school's 50 metres record with a run of 5.83 seconds at Saskatoon’s Knights of Columbus Indoor Games.

Although his 2025 outdoor season was truncated by hamstring issues, Davis set a new school record in the 60 metres with 6.60 seconds in 2026. He won his first U Sports gold medal ahead of Travis Campbell and Keon Rude in the 60 metres in Winnipeg in March 2026. Running 6.59 seconds in the 60 m final, he broke his own school record and was 0.02 seconds of the U Sports record set in 2010. It was the first time a Manitoban sprinter had run below 6.60 seconds for the 60 metres, and just the third time it had been achieved by a Canadian university athlete. He was selected for the 60 metres at the 2026 World Athletics Indoor Championships in Toruń, Poland, without reaching the semi-finals. He was selected as part of the Canadian team for the 2026 World Athletics Relays.

== Personal life ==
From a running family, his father, Anthony, ran for the University of Manitoba in the 1990s, and was part of the school's 4×400 metres relay team that set a Canada West record in 1994, as well as having cousins who also compete in track and field.
