= John Cabang =

Filipino sprinter and hurler (born 2001)

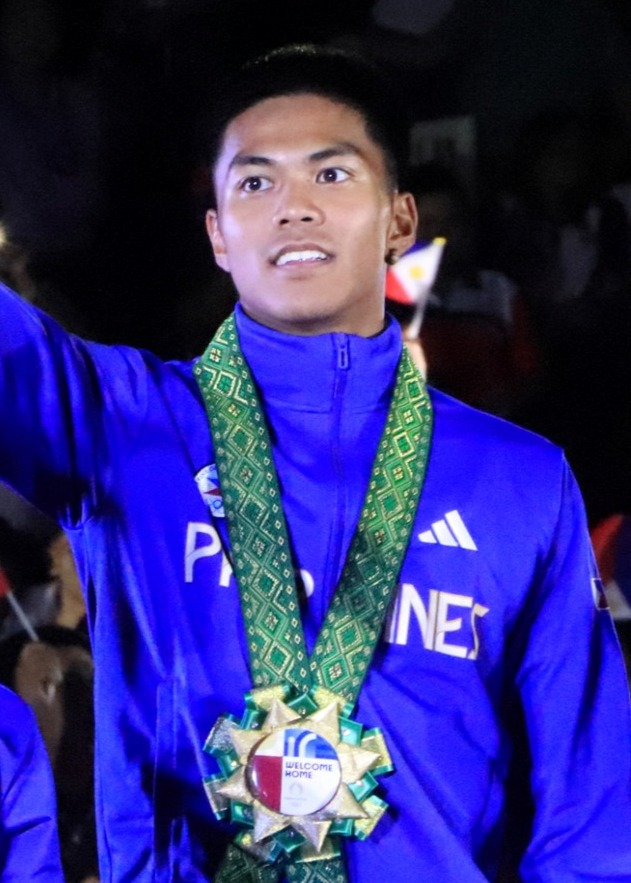
- Cabang in 2024

Personal information
- Full name: John Christopher Cabang Tolentino
- National team: Philippines
- Born: August 27, 2001 (age 25) Madrid, Spain
- Home town: San Sebastián, Spain

Sport
- Sport: Track
- Events: Hurdles and sprints
Medal record
Representing Philippines
Men's athletics
Asian Games
Bronze medal – third place	Aichi–Nagoya 2026	110 m hurdles
Asian Indoor Championships
Bronze medal – third place	Tehran 2024	60 m hurdles
SEA Games
Gold medal – first place	Thailand 2025	110 m hurdles
Bronze medal – third place	Cambodia 2023	110 m hurdles

John Christopher Cabang Tolentino (born August 27, 2001) is a Filipino hurdler and sprinter. He is the current national record holder in 110 m hurdles and has qualified to represent the Philippines at the 2024 Summer Olympics in Paris, France.

== Early life and education ==
Born to Filipino parents Emma and Jose in Madrid, Cabang was raised by adoptive Spanish parents. He moved to San Sebastián in the Basque Country at age nine.

In 2023, Cabang was majoring in robotics at the Tolosaldea Lanbide Heziketa Institua.

== Career ==
In a bid to become part of the Philippine national team, Cabang would approach the Philippine Athletics Track and Field Association (PATAFA) in 2022.

He is a bronze medalist at the 2024 Asian Indoor Athletics Championships in Tehran.

Cabang qualified for the 2024 Summer Olympics in Paris. He failed to secure an outright semifinals berth in the men's 110m hurdles. He dropped to the repechage which he forfeited due to an injury.

The injury rendered Cabang unable to compete for eight months before returning to the ICTSI Philippine Athletics Championships in May 2025. He recovered from injury with the support of his coach Martin de la Fuente and physiologists at Real Sociedad.

At the 2025 SEA Games, Cabang set a time of 13.66 seconds to won a gold medal. It would have been a competition record if not for a failed zero control test. He aims to represent the Philippines again at the 2028 Summer Olympics.

Cabang became the first male hurdler to win a medal at the Asian Games for the Philippines when he earned a bronze medal at the 110-meter in the 2026 edition in Aichi and Nagoya, Japan.

== Personal life ==
Cabang is remains in contact with his birth mother and cites as the reason for representing the Philippines. He also acknowledges being raised in Spanish culture although he remarked he felt "more Basque than Spanish".
