= Jamar Marshall =

American athlete

Personal information
- Nationality: American
- Born: 18 December 2001 (age 24)

Sport
- Country: United States
- Sport: Athletics
- Event: 110 m hurdles

Achievements and titles
- Personal best: 110 m hurdles: 13.04 (2026)

Jamar Marshall (born 18 December 2001) is an American high hurdler.

== Biography ==
Marshall attended St. Mary's Stockton High School in California. He won the 2019 California high school championships in the 110m hurdles and the 300 metres hurdles and won at Brooks PR for first national high school title. That June, he ran 13.22 seconds at the USATF U20 Outdoor Championships, to move to third fastest all-time on the American high school list.

A student at the University of Houston, Marshall placed fifth in the 110 metres hurdles at the 2021 NCAA Championships in 13.53 seconds. However, he had to recover from heart surgery after being diagnosed with heart surgery due to Wolff-Parkinson-White syndrome, a condition which causes rapid and irregular heartbeats.

Marshall placed fourth in the 110 metres hurdles at the 2025 NCAA Championships in 13.34 seconds, and was a finalist at the 2025 USA Outdoor Track and Field Championships.

Marshall ran a personal best for the 110 metres hurdles at the USATF Lone Star Grand Prix in June 2026 with 13.04 seconds. On 4 July, Marshall placed sixth in the Diamond League event 110 metres hurdles at the 2026 Prefontaine Classic. In September, he competed in the 110 m hurdles at the inaugural World Ultimate Championship in Budapest.
