= Cordell Tinch =

American athlete

Personal information
- Nationality: American
- Born: 13 July 2000 (age 26)
- Height: 6 ft 2 in (1.88 m)
- Weight: 175 lb (79 kg)

Sport
- Country: United States
- Sport: Athletics
- Event: 110 m hurdles

Achievements and titles
- Personal bests: 110 m hurdles: 12.87 (Keqiao, 2025); High jump: 2.21 m (Pueblo, 2023); Long jump: 8.29 m (Fayetteville, 2026)
Medal record
Men's athletics
Representing the United States
World Championships
Gold medal – first place	2025 Tokyo	110 m hurdles
World Ultimate Championship
Second place	2026 Budapest	110 m hurdles
Diamond League
First place	2025 Diamond League	110 m hurdles

Cordell Tinch (born 13 July 2000) is an American track and field athlete. He is the reigning World Champion in the 110 m hurdles, having won the title at the 2025 World Championships.

Competing at the 2026 USA Outdoor Track and Field Championships he won the American national title in the 100 metres hurdles, and also placed third overall in the long jump.

== Biography ==
=== Early life ===
Tinch grew up in both Chicago and Green Bay, Wisconsin, where he attended Bay Port High School. As a junior, he competed in multiple track and field events, and won the Wisconsin state titles in the triple jump (with a state record 14.99 m), and the long jump, whilst also being runner-up in the high jump and 110 metres hurdles. He also played basketball, but his main focus was on American Football, and on reaching the NFL and he attended University of Minnesota on a football scholarship. Ultimately, he decided football was not the path he wished to follow, and he switched to Pittsburg State University in 2019. However, there was an issue with the transfer and he couldn't compete in the national athletics events. The COVID-19 pandemic also interrupted the meet schedule so he stepped away from track and field and moved back to Green Bay.

While in high school, he was teammates with Tyrese Haliburton for basketball.

=== Return to athletics ===
Tinch returned to athletics at Pittsburg State University, and became NCAA Division II men's indoor track and field championships champion in the 60 m hurdles and the high jump in 2023. Tinch was named the National Men’s Track Athlete of the Year for the 2023 NCAA DII Indoor Track & Field season, owning seven of the top-10 marks in NCAA DII history for the 60 m hurdles.

Competing outdoors at the Mid-America Intercollegiate Athletics Association (MIAA) Championships in Jefferson City, he won the long jump and the high jump before running a wind-assisted 12.97s for the 110 m hurdles, becoming the No. 2 collegian of all-time in all conditions, behind only Renaldo Nehemiah from 1979.

In June 2023, Tinch ran a world-leading 12.96 seconds for the 110 m hurdles at the Arkansas Grand Prix in Fayetteville, Arkansas. The time was a collegiate record, 0.02 seconds faster than Grant Holloway’s previous NCAA record. He announced he was turning pro that month, despite possessing two further years of additional collegiate availability.

Competing at the 2023 USA Outdoor Track and Field Championships, in Eugene, Oregon, he finished 2nd in the final of the 110 m hurdles. He was selected for the 2023 World Athletics Championships, in Budapest in August 2023, where he reached the semi-finals.

He qualified for the final of the 110 metres hurdles at the 2024 US Olympic Trials in Eugene, Oregon in June 2024, placing fourth in 13.03 seconds. On 12 July 2024, he finished third at the 2024 Herculis Diamond League event in Monaco.

=== 2025: World champion ===
He won the 110 m hurdles at the 2025 Xiamen Diamond League event in China, in April 2025. He also secured a victory in the 110 m hurdles at the 2025 Shanghai Diamond League, running a meet record of 12.87 seconds, a time which moved him to equal fourth on the world 110 m hurdles all-time list. In May 2025, he was named as a challenger in the short hurdles category at the 2025 Grand Slam Track event in Philadelphia, finishing runner-up in the 110 m hurdles to Jamal Britt. He was runner-up in the 110 metres hurdles at the Diamond League events at the 2025 Golden Gala in Rome on 6 June and in Monaco at the 2025 Herculis on 11 July.

On 3 August 2025, he was runner-up at the 2025 USA Outdoor Track and Field Championships in Eugene, Oregon, behind Ja'Kobe Tharp. He set a meeting record to win at the 2025 Kamila Skolimowska Memorial, in Poland, in the 110 metres hurdles on 16 August. He dipped below 13 seconds again to win in 12.98 (0.3 m/s) at the 2025 Athletissima event in Lausanne in wet conditions. He ran 12.92 seconds (+0.3) for the 110 metres hurdles at the Diamond League Final in Zurich on 28 August to equal the meeting record that was set in 1989.

He won the gold medal over 110 metres hurdles at the 2025 World Athletics Championships in Tokyo, Japan, winning with a time of 12.99 seconds (-0.3) in the final.

=== 2026: American champion ===
On 1 February 2026, he won the 60 metres hurdles at the Millrose Games, but suggested afterwards he was thinking about pursuing long jump for the remainder of the indoor season. In his first long jump competition since December 2024, Tinch moved to third on the world-list with 8.29 m at the Tyson Invitational in Fayetteville, Arkansas on 13 February 2026. Tinch competed in the long jump at the 2026 USA Indoor Track and Field Championships in New York, placing sixth overall.

After transitioning back to the hurdles for the outdoor season, Tinch placed second to Jamal Britt in 13.10 seconds at the 2026 Shanghai Diamond League. On 19 June, he won the 110 metres hurdles ahead of Asier Martinez and Thomas Wilkes at the 2026 Doha Diamond League. On 4 July, Tinch ran 13.07 seconds for fourth at the 2026 Prefontaine Classic.

On 23 July 2026, Tinch placed fourth with 7.94m in the long jump at the 2026 USA Outdoor Track and Field Championships in New York. Later that weekend, Tinch won his first American championship title in the 110 m hurdles, finishing in 13.00 seconds, four-thousandths of a second ahead of Bradley Franklin, who was credited with the same time. On 11 September, he placed second in the final at the inaugural World Ultimate Championship in Budapest, running a season's best 12.95 seconds and finishing part of an American one-two-three with winner Ja'Kobe Tharp and third-place athlete Bradley Franklin.
