= Matteo Togni =

Czech athlete (born 2006)

Personal information
- Born: 14 February 2006 (age 20)

Sport
- Sport: Athletics
- Event: Hurdles
Medal record
Men's athletics
Representing Italy
European U20 Championships
Gold medal – first place	2025 Tampere	100 m hurdles

Matteo Togni (born 14 February 2006) is an Italian hurdler. He won the gold medal at the 2025 European Athletics U20 Championships in the 110 metres hurdles. He set Italian under-20 records in the 110m hurdles in 2025, and the 60 metres hurdles in 2024.

== Career ==
Togni is from Treviolo, Lombardy, and initially placed football as a winger for US Roncola, prior to focusing on athletics during the Covid-19 pandemic, describing himself as a footballer as "fast, not so good with my feet". He tried many disciplines, such as long jump, before being identified as a potential hurdler by athletics coach Mattia Folli.

Competing as a member of Bergamo Stars Atletica in 2024, Togni twice set an Italian under-20 record in the 60 metres hurdles, improving on the previous record of Lorenzo Simonelli, by running 7.79, and then 7.76 seconds. That summer, he also broke Simonelli's under-20 record in the 110 metres hurdles, running 13.73 seconds in Geneva, Switzerland, over 106 cm barriers. That year, he joined Fiamme Oro, and won the Italian under-20 championships over 99 cm barriers, running 13.46 seconds (+0.8 m/s) in Rieti. He subsequently competed at the 2024 World Athletics U20 Championships in Lima, Peru, the following month, where he was a semi-finalist as an 18 year-old.

Despite a lower lumbar injury to his back which derailed his 2025 indoor season, Togni won the gold medal in the 110 metres hurdles at the 2025 European Athletics U20 Championships in Tampere, Finland, setting an Italian under-20 record of 13.27 seconds (+0.4 m/s).
