= Keon Rude =

Canadian hurdler (born 2005)

Personal information
- Born: 22 January 2005 (age 21)

Sport
- Sport: Athletics
- Event(s): Hurdles, Sprint

Achievements and titles
- Personal best(s): 60m: 6.65 (2026); 100m: 10.43 (2024); 200m: 21.26 (2024); 60mH: 7.75 (2026) NU23R; 110mH: 14.40 (2025)

Keon Rude (born 22 January 2005) is a Canadian sprinter and sprint hurdler. He became the Canadian under-23 record holder in the 60 metres hurdles in 2026 and was selected for the 2026 World Athletics Indoor Championships.

== Biography ==
From Calgary, Alberta, Rude competed at the 2025 Edmonton Athletics Invitational where he set a personal best of 10.43 seconds for the 100 metres. He secured a double win at the 2024 Canadian Olympic Track and Field Trials in Montreal, winning both the U20 men’s 100 metres and 110 metres hurdles events. He won the U20 100m title with a time of 10.56 seconds before winning with a personal best performance of 13.84 seconds in the 110m hurdles He subsequently represented Canada at the 2024 World Athletics U20 Championships in Lima, Peru. Rude won the men's 100m final at the 2025 Canada Games, running a time of 10.50 seconds.

Rude set a personal best of 7.85 seconds For the 60 metres hurdles in 2026 as he won OUA gold competing for the University of Guelph. Two weeks later, he lowered his personal best again as he won the 60m hurdles U Sports indoor championship title in 7.75 seconds, a time which set a new U23 Canadian record, a U Sports record, and Guelph program record. It also placed him sixth on the all-time Canadian list. He also placed third in the 60 metres final at the championships in Winnipeg, running a time of a 6.74 seconds to place behind Travis Campbell and Tyrell Davis.

Rude was selected to represent Canada in the 60 metres hurdles at the 2026 World Athletics Indoor Championships in Toruń, Poland, in March 2026, running 7.94 seconds.
