= Bradley Franklin =

American Hurdler (born 2006)

Personal information
- Born: 25 July 2006 (age 20)

Sport
- Sport: Athletics
- Events: Sprint, Hurdles

Achievements and titles
- Personal bests: 100 m: 10.44 (2025); 110 mH: 12.99 (2026); Indoor; 60 m: 6.63 (2026); 60 mH: 7.42 (2026)
Medal record
Men's athletics
Representing the United States
World Ultimate Championship
Third place	2026 Budapest	110 m hurdles

Bradley Franklin (born 25 July 2006) is an American high hurdler. He placed second in the 110 metres hurdles at the 2026 USA Outdoor Track and Field Championships.

== Biography ==
From Alabaster, Alabama, Franklin attended Thompson High School. In February 2024, he was ranked first in the 60 metres hurdles in the United States for his age-group.

Franklin competed at the 2025 NCAA Championships both indoors and outdoors for Samford University, eleventh and fifteenth in the hurdles at the respective events. The following winter, he went into the 2026 NCAA Division I Indoor Track and Field Championships as the top seed in the 60 metres hurdles, holding a 0.04 second lead over Malachi Snow, having won the 2026 Southern Conference Indoor Track & Field Championships. He had also won the 60 metres dash at the championships. In March, Franklin won his semi-final at the NCAA Indoor Championships with a time of 7.42 seconds, before finishing runner-up in the final in 7.43 behind Ja'Kobe Tharp's winning time of 7.32 seconds. Following this performance, Franklin signed a Name, Image and Likeness (NIL) contract with ON Running.

Competing outdoors the following month, Franklin won the 110 m final of the Tom Jones Memorial in Gainesville, Florida, running a wind-assisted 13.07 (+2.7) to move to sixth on the collegiate all-conditions all-time list. On 12 June, he placed fifth in the 110 m hurdles final at the 2026 NCAA Outdoor Championships, running 13.19 seconds. In July, Franklin ran a personal best 13.04 seconds to qualify fastest for the final of the 110 m hurdles at the 2026 USA Outdoor Track and Field Championships in New York, before lowering it further in the final, placing second overall by four-thousandths of a second behind World Champion Cordell Tinch 12.993 to 12.997 seconds, with both credited with the same time of 13.00 seconds. On 11 September, he placed third in the final at the inaugural World Ultimate Championship in Budapest, part of an American one-two-three behind Tharp and Tinch. In the semi-final he ran a new personal best of 12.99 seconds.
