= Travis Campbell =

Canadian sprinter (born 2003)

Personal information
- Born: 8 May 2003 (age 23)

Sport
- Sport: Athletics
- Event: Sprint

Achievements and titles
- Personal best(s): 60m: 6.56 (2026); 100m: 10.29 (2025); 200m: 21.27 (2025)

Travis Campbell (born 8 May 2003) is a Canadian sprinter. He was selected to represent Canada at the 2026 World Athletics Indoor Championships.

== Biography ==
From Milton, Ontario, Campbell was a soccer player for Milton Magic prior to focusing on athletics. He attended Bishop Reding Catholic Secondary School before going to the University of Guelph to study biological science and French. He was a member of Hamilton Olympic and later ran with Royal City Track & Field Club.

Campbell set the University of Guelph school record for the 60 metres of 6.65 seconds in 2025, finishing third at the U Sports Indoor Championships that year. He ran a personal best of 10.29 seconds for the 100 metres in Florida in the spring of 2025, and placed sixth in the 100 m final at the 2025 Canadian Athletics Championships. In 2025, he represented Canada at the 2025 Summer World University Games in Bochum, Germany in both the 100 metres and 4 x 100 m relay, where he placed 12th in the 100 m and helped Canada to ninth overall in the relay. At the 2025 Canada Games he led Ontario in the 4 x 100 metres relay victory, although was disqualified for a false start in the 100 m final after running 10.48 adores in the heats.

In January 2026, he lowered the University of Guelph school record to 6.58 seconds. He placed second behind Tyrell Davis in the 60 m final at the 2026 U Sports Indoor Championships in Winnipeg, with a run of 6.62 seconds. He was selected for the 60 metres at the 2026 World Athletics Indoor Championships in Toruń, Poland, without advancing to the semi-finals. He was selected as part of the Canadian team for the 2026 World Athletics Relays.
