= Ja'Kobe Tharp =

American hurdler (born 2005)

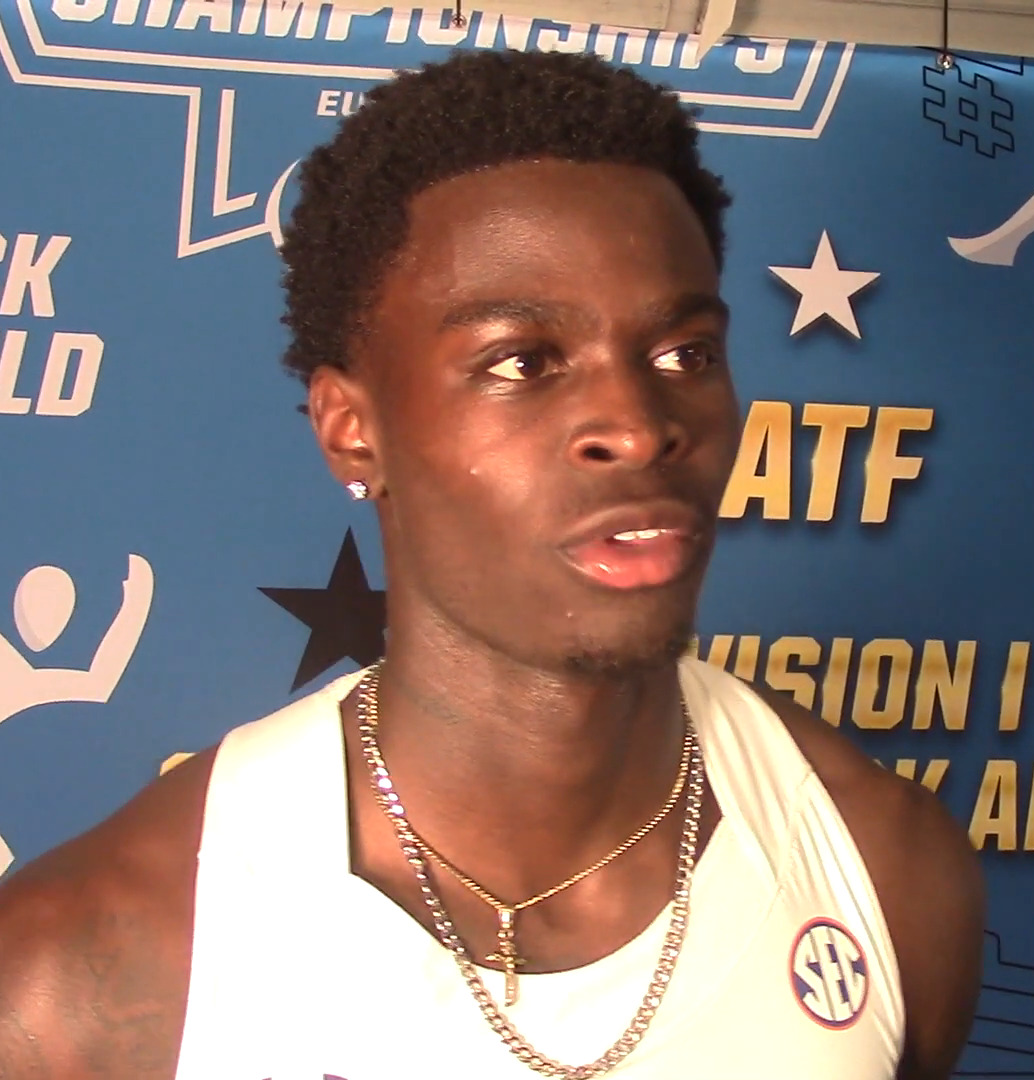
- Tharp at the 2025 NCAA Outdoor Championships

Personal information
- Born: September 30, 2005 (age 21) Murfreesboro, Tennessee, US
- Education: Auburn University
- Height: 194 cm (6 ft 4 in)

Sport
- Sport: Athletics
- Event: Hurdles

Achievements and titles
- Personal bests: 60 m hurdles 7.32 (2026); 110 m hurdles: 12.75 (2026) WR
Medal record
Men's athletics
Representing United States
World Ultimate Championship
First place	2026 Budapest	110 m hurdles
Diamond League
First place	2026 Brussels	110 m hurdles
World U20 Championships
Gold medal – first place	2024 Lima	110 m hurdles

Ja'Kobe Tharp (/dʒəˈkoʊbi ˈθɑːrp/; born September 30, 2005) is an American athlete specializing in the high hurdles. As of 2026, he holds the current world record in 110 meters hurdles, with a time of 12.75 seconds set at the 2026 NCAA Outdoor Championships. He won the inaugural World Ultimate Championship that year, and gold medals in 110 m hurdles at the 2025 American Championships and the 2024 World U20 Championships. He was a finalist at the 2025 World Championships and won the 2025 NCAA Outdoor Championships. In the indoor 60 meters hurdles, he holds the third fastest time, and the fastest for a college athlete, with a time of 7.32 seconds set at the 2026 NCAA Indoor Championships.

== Early and personal life ==
Tharp was born in Murfreesboro, Tennessee, and initially raised in Fulton, Kentucky. He later moved and attended Rockvale High School in Tennessee. Both his parents were basketball players; his father, Jimmie Ware, was a high school player and his mother, Aminda, played for Tennessee–Martin and Dyersburg State CC.

== Career ==
=== 2024: World U20 champion ===
He finished runner-up at the NCAA Championships in June 2024, running for Auburn University. He finished the NCAA season with a 13.18 seconds personal best. He achieved that in winning the Southeastern Conference in Gainesville, Florida. This time set a new national U20 record breaking the previous mark set by Renaldo Nehemiah in 1978. Later that month, he won the 110 m hurdle final at the USATF U20 Championships in Eugene, Oregon.

He competed at the 2024 World Athletics U20 Championships in Lima, Peru, qualifying for the final with a year world U20 leading time of 13.11 seconds. He won the gold medal in the final with a 13.05 seconds (-0.5 m/s) lifetime best time, and a national U20 record over the 99 cm hurdles, as well as a 2024 world U20 leading time.

=== 2025: American champion ===
Tharp ran 7.45 seconds to win the 2025 NCAA Indoor Championships in Virginia Beach on March 15, 2025. He ran 13.15 seconds for the 110 m hurdles to finish second at the 2025 SEC Championships, a time which moved him to fifth on the NCAA all-time list. In June 2025, he also won the 2025 NCAA Outdoor Championships 110 meters hurdles title in Eugene, Oregon, in a personal best time of 13.05 seconds. He ran 13.17 seconds to place third at the 2025 Herculis event in Monaco on his Diamond League debut on July 11, 2025.

On August 3, 2025, he ran a personal best 13.01 seconds to win the 2025 USA Outdoor Track and Field Championships in Eugene, Oregon ahead of Cordell Tinch. He was a finalist competing at the 2025 World Athletics Championships in the men's 110 meters hurdles in Tokyo, Japan, in September 2025, placing sixth overall. In December he was one of three finalist for the 2025 Bowerman Award, ultimately won by Jordan Anthony.

=== 2026: World record holder ===
In February 2026, he won the 60 meters hurdles in 7.48 seconds at the SEC Indoor Championships, winning by 0.02 seconds from Ja'Qualon Scott. Tharp ran a personal best of 7.36 to win his preliminary 60 m hurdles heat on March 13 at the 2026 NCAA Indoor Championships. The time was the second fastest in NCAA history and just .01 seconds behind the NCAA record of Grant Holloway, and the fourth fastest in world history. The following day, Tharp won the final in 7.32 seconds to break Holloway's 7.35 collegiate record, and move to second on the American all-time list and third worldwide behind Holloway and Colin Jackson. In May, Tharp ran 13.05 to win the 110 m hurdles at both the SEC Championships and NCAA East Regionals and qualified for the 2026 NCAA Outdoor Championships.

In the preliminary heats of the NCAA championship in Hayward Field, Eugene, he broke the world record with a time of 12.75 seconds (with a tail wind of 1.0 m/s (Note: The limit to qualify for a world record is 2.0 m/s.)), which is pending ratification. This broke the previous record of 12.80 seconds, set by compatriot Aries Merritt in 2012. It was the first world record set at the NCAA Championships since Dwight Stones in the high jump in 1976, and was run on the same track (Hayward Field) as the women's world record, set by Tobi Amusan in 2022. Stones was the ESPN coverage announcer for the race. Tharp expressed surprise at breaking the record, stating "It wasn't on my bingo chart for this meet, not at all. I'm speechless, seriously." On June 12, Tharp returned to win the final with 12.90 seconds into a head-wind, winning ahead of Kendrick Smallwood, who ran 12.95 seconds. Shortly afterwards, Tharp announced he would forego his remaining college eligibility to race professionally.

On 4 July, he ran 12.91 seconds to finish runner-up at the Prefontaine Classic. On 14 July in Budapest, Tharp ran the 12.85 seconds, the fifth fastest all-time for the 110 m hurdles, to win the István Gyulai Memorial, despite slowing to celebrate before the finish line. Competing at the London Athletics Meet on 18 July, he won the 110 m hurdles with a meeting record of 12.89 seconds (-0.3). On 23 August, he won in 13.05 seconds (-0.7m/s) for the 110 m hurdles in the Diamond League at the Kamila Skolimowska Memorial in Silesia, Poland. At the 2026 Diamond League Final in Brussels on 4 September, Tharp won the 110 metres hurdles title in a time of 13.03 seconds ahead of Jamal Britt and Trey Cunningham. The following week, he won the final at the inaugural World Ultimate Championship in an American one-two-three finish, ahead of Tinch and Bradley Franklin.
