= 2017 Asian Athletics Championships – Men's 110 metres hurdles =

Sporting event

The men's 110 metres hurdles at the 2017 Asian Athletics Championships was held on 8 July.

== Medalists ==
Gold	Abdulaziz Al-Mandeel; Kuwait
Silver	Yaqoub Mohamed Al-Youha; Kuwait
Bronze	Ahmed Khader Al-Muwallad; Saudi Arabia

== Results ==
=== Heats ===
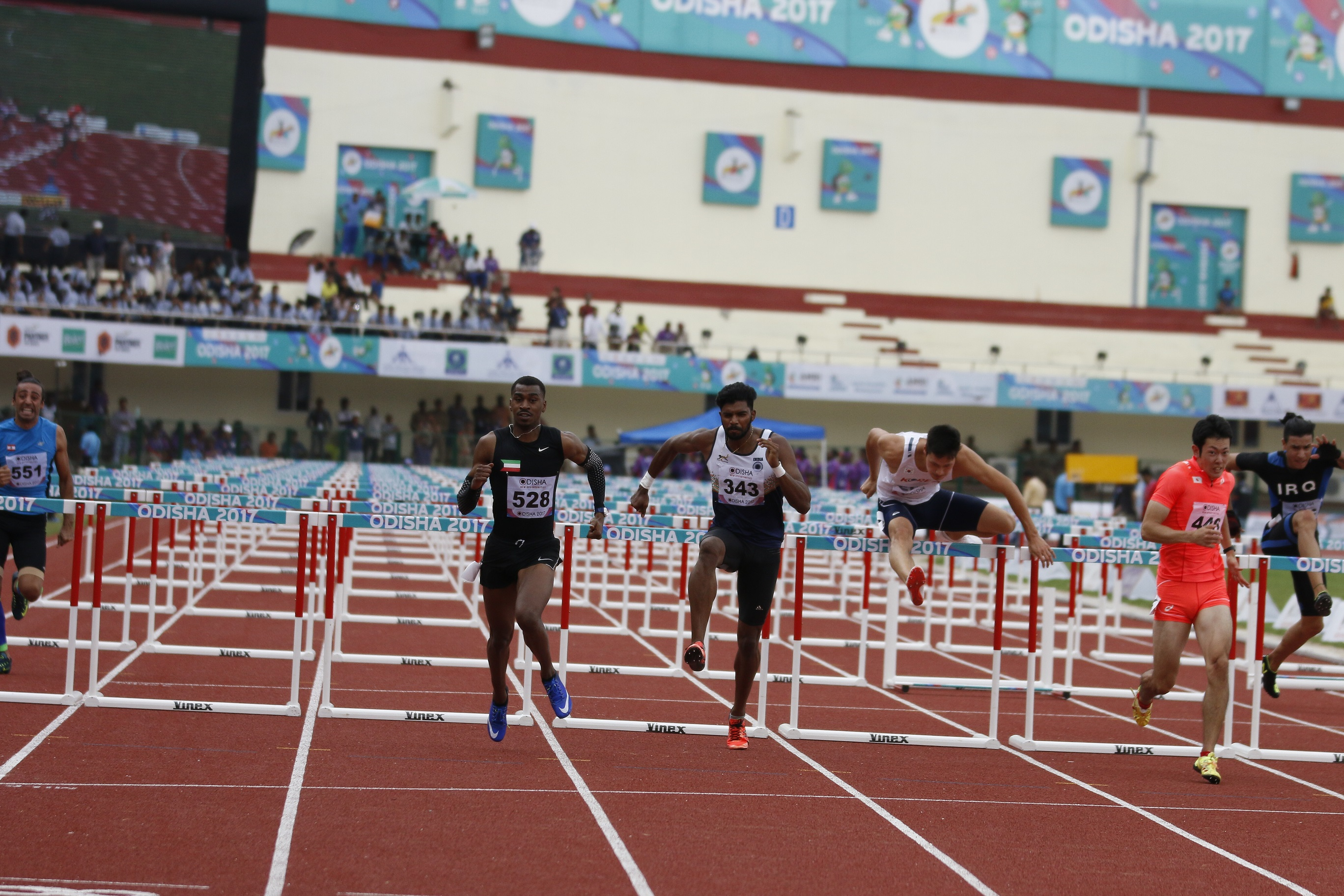
Heat 2

Qualification rule: First 2 in each heat (Q) and the next 2 fastest (q) qualified for the final.

Wind:
Heat 1: -0.4 m/s, Heat 2: -0.4 m/s, Heat 3: +0.1 m/s

Rank	Heat	Name	Nationality	Time	Notes
1	2	Yaqoub Mohamed Al-Youha	Kuwait	13.60	Q
2	1	Abdulaziz Al-Mandeel	Kuwait	13.65	Q
3	3	Ahmed Khader Al-Muwallad	Saudi Arabia	13.69	Q
4	2	Shunya Takayama	Japan	13.70	Q
5	2	Siddhant Thingalaya	India	13.72	q
6	1	Chen Kuei-ru	Chinese Taipei	13.76	Q
7	3	Wataru Yazawa	Japan	13.83	Q
8	3	Yang Wei-ting	Chinese Taipei	13.86	q
9	1	Jiang Fan	China	13.97	
10	3	Milad Sayar	Iran	14.02	
11	1	Rayzam Shah Wan Sofian	Malaysia	14.03	
12	2	Kim Byung-jun	South Korea	14.07	
13	1	Rio Maholtra	Indonesia	14.08	
14	3	Cheung Wang Fung	Hong Kong	14.13	
15	2	Mohammed Sad	Iraq	14.18	
16	1	Mahdi Abdullah Al-Othman	Saudi Arabia	14.22	
17	3	Prem Kumar	India	14.39	
18	1	Vyacheslav Zems	Kazakhstan	14.42	
19	1	Chan Chung Wang	Hong Kong	14.45	
20	2	Ahmad Hazer	Lebanon	14.65	
21	2	Lai Ho Tat Costa	Macau	14.90	
22	3	Md Khan	Bangladesh	15.41	
23	1	Htet Zwe	Myanmar	15.72	
	2	Patrick Ma Unso	Philippines	DNS	
	3	Moath Yousef Marei	Jordan	DNS	

=== Final ===
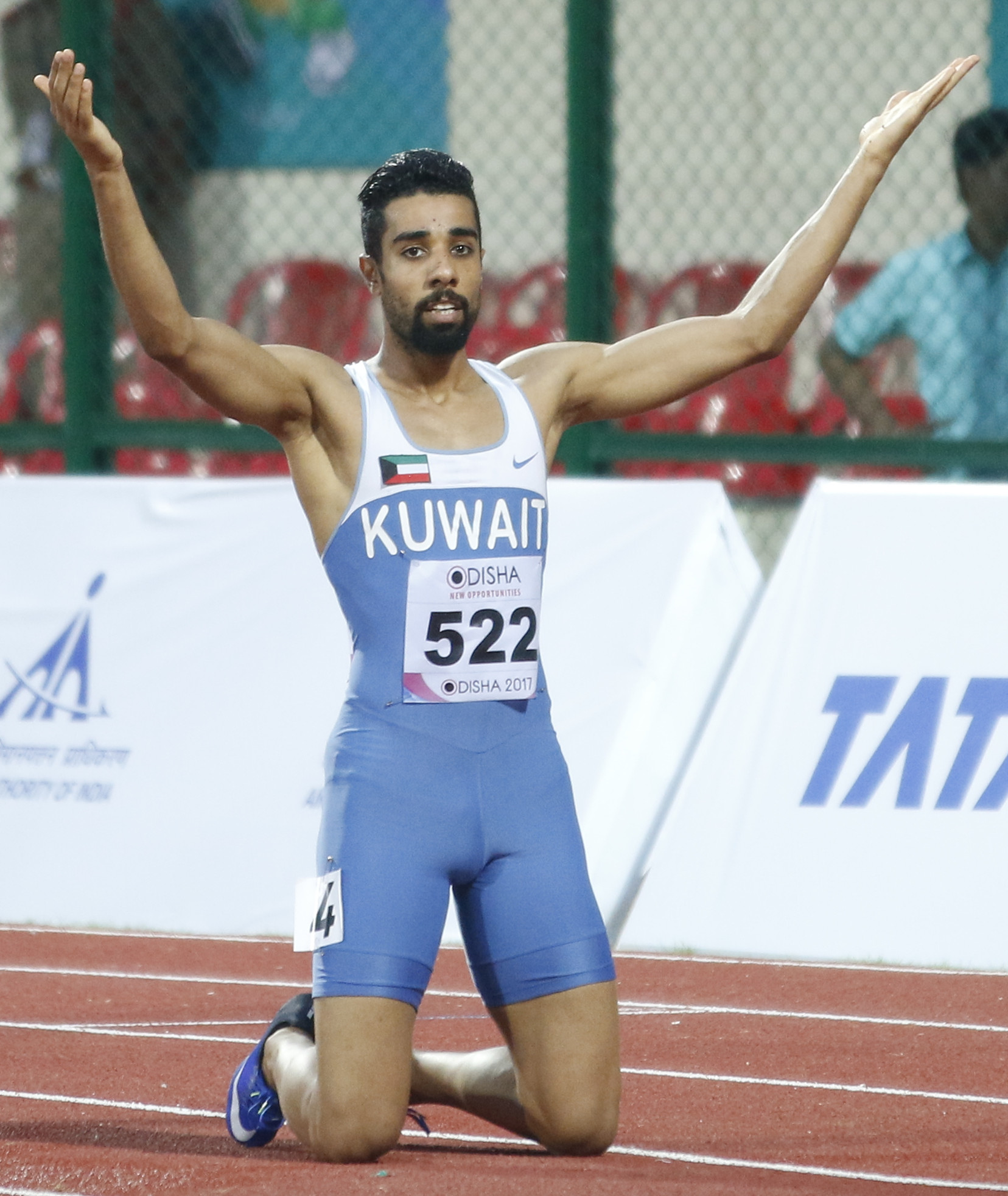
The gold medal winner, Abdulaziz Al-Mandeel

Wind: -0.6 m/s

Rank	Lane	Name	Nationality	Time	Notes
1st place, gold medalist(s)	4	Abdulaziz Al-Mandeel	Kuwait	13.50	
2nd place, silver medalist(s)	3	Yaqoub Mohamed Al-Youha	Kuwait	13.59	
3rd place, bronze medalist(s)	5	Ahmed Khader Al-Muwallad	Saudi Arabia	13.61	
4	6	Shunya Takayama	Japan	13.65	
5	2	Siddhant Thingalaya	India	13.72	
6	7	Chen Kuei-ru	Chinese Taipei	13.82	
7	1	Yang Wei-ting	Chinese Taipei	13.83	
8	8	Wataru Yazawa	Japan	14.07	
