= 2019 Asian Athletics Championships – Men's 110 metres hurdles =

Men's 110 metres hurdles at the 2019 Asian Athletics Championships
- Venue: Khalifa International Stadium
- Location: Doha, Qatar
- Dates: 23 April (heats); 24 April (final)
- Competitors: 18 from 11 nations
- Winning time: 13.21 CR

Medalists
gold medal	Xie Wenjun	China
silver medal	Yaqoub Al-Youha	Kuwait
bronze medal	Chen Kuei-ru	Chinese Taipei

The men's 110 metres hurdles event at the 2019 Asian Athletics Championships was held on 23 and 24 April.

== Records ==
Records before the 2019 Asian Athletics Championships
Record	Athlete (nation)	Time (s)	Location	Date
World record	Aries Merritt (USA)	12.80	Brussels, Belgium	7 September 2012
Asian record	Liu Xiang (CHN)	12.88	Lausanne, Switzerland	11 July 2006
Championship record	Liu Xiang (CHN)	13.22	Kobe, Japan	10 July 2011
World leading	Grant Holloway (USA)	13.28	Gainesville, United States	29 March 2019
Asian leading	Xie Wenjun (CHN)	13.46	Tempe, United States	6 April 2019

== Results ==
=== Heats ===
Qualification rule: First 2 in each heat (Q) and the next 3 fastest (q) qualified for the final.

Wind:
Heat 1: +2.1 m/s, Heat 2: +1.0 m/s, Heat 3: +1.6 m/s

Rank	Heat	Name	Nationality	Time	Notes
1	3	Xie Wenjun	China	13.47	Q
2	1	Yaqoub Al-Youha	Kuwait	13.49	Q
3	3	Chen Kuei-ru	Chinese Taipei	13.61	Q, SB
4	1	Taio Kanai	Japan	13.67	Q
5	1	Zeng Jianhang	China	13.69	q
5	2	Shunya Takayama	Japan	13.69	Q
7	1	Yang Wei-ting	Chinese Taipei	13.75	
8	2	Mui Ching Yeung	Hong Kong	13.88	Q
8	2	David Yefremov	Kazakhstan	13.88	Q, PB
10	2	Ahmed Al-Muwallad	Saudi Arabia	13.88	
11	1	Clinton Kingsley Bautista	Philippines	14.06	
12	1	Vyacheslav Zems	Kazakhstan	14.07	
13	2	Ang Chen Xiang	Singapore	14.25	NR
14	3	Anousone Xaysa	Laos	14.45	SB
15	3	Awyong Liang Qi	Singapore	14.51	
16	3	Chan Chung Wang	Hong Kong	14.52	
17	2	Owaab Barrow	Qatar	14.67	SB
17	3	Mohammad Al-Enezi	Kuwait	14.67	SB
	1	Saleh Kadhim Naser	Iraq	DNS	
	2	Mohammed Sad Al-Khafaji	Iraq	DNS	

=== Final ===
Wind: +1.7 m/s

Rank	Lane	Name	Nationality	Time	Notes
1st place, gold medalist(s)	7	Xie Wenjun	China	13.21	WL, CR, PB
2nd place, silver medalist(s)	6	Yaqoub Al-Youha	Kuwait	13.35	NR
3rd place, bronze medalist(s)	5	Chen Kuei-ru	Chinese Taipei	13.39	=NR
4	4	Shunya Takayama	Japan	13.59	
5	9	Taio Kanai	Japan	13.64	
6	3	David Yefremov	Kazakhstan	13.83	PB
7	2	Zeng Jianhang	China	13.85	SB
8	8	Mui Ching Yeung	Hong Kong	13.96	
