= 2025 Asian Athletics Championships – Men's 110 metres hurdles =

Men's 110 metres hurdles at the 2025 Asian Athletics Championships
- Venue: Gumi Civic Stadium
- Location: Gumi, South Korea
- Dates: 28 May (heats); 29 May (final)
- Competitors: 23 from 17 nations
- Winning time: 13.22

Medalists
gold medal	Rachid Muratake	Japan
silver medal	Liu Junxi	China
bronze medal	Qin Weibo	China

The men's 110 metres hurdles event at the 2025 Asian Athletics Championships was held on 28 and 29 May.

== Records ==
Records before the 2025 Asian Athletics Championships
Record	Athlete (nation)	Time (s)	Location	Date
World record	Aries Merritt (USA)	12.80	Brussels, Belgium	7 September 2012
Asian record	Liu Xiang (CHN)	12.88	Lausanne, Switzerland	11 July 2006
Championship record	Xie Wenjun (CHN)	13.21	Guangzhou, China	24 April 2019
World leading	Cordell Tinch (USA)	12.87	Shaoxing, China	3 May 2025
Asian leading	Rachid Muratake (JPN)	13.10	Shaoxing, China	3 May 2025

== Schedule ==
The event schedule, in local time (UTC+9), was as follows:

Date	Time	Round
28 May	10:25	Heats
29 May	22:05	Final

== Results ==
=== Heats ===
Held on 28 May. First 2 in each heat (Q) and the next 2 fastest (q) qualified for the final.

==== Heat 1 ====
Place	Lane	Athlete	Nation	Time	Notes
1	2	Rachid Muratake	Japan	13.33	Q
2	3	Qin Weibo	China	13.48	Q
3	4	Lin Yi-kai	Chinese Taipei	13.63	q
4	7	Kim Ju-ho	South Korea	13.71	q, PB
5	6	Ang Chen Xiang	Singapore	13.87	
6	8	Ergash Normuradov	Uzbekistan	14.02	PB
7	5	Baqer Al-Jumah	Saudi Arabia	14.04	PB
				Wind: (+0.4 m/s)	

==== Heat 2 ====
Place	Lane	Athlete	Nation	Time	Notes
1	1	Liu Junxi	China	13.45	Q
2	2	David Yefremov	Kazakhstan	13.86	Q
3	7	Yaqoub Al-Youha	Kuwait	13.89	SB
4	5	Kim Kyong-tae	South Korea	13.95	
5	6	Mohd Rizzua Haizad Muhamad	Malaysia	14.08	
6	3	Kadhim Naser	Iraq	14.12 [.116]	SB
7	4	Liu Hiu Long	Hong Kong	14.12 [.118]	
8	8	Sivone Phonemanivong	Laos	15.97	SB
				Wind: (+1.6 m/s)	

==== Heat 3 ====
Place	Lane	Athlete	Nation	Time	Notes
1	1	Oumar Doudai Abakar	Qatar	13.39	Q
2	4	Masoud Kamran	Iran	13.62	Q, PB
3	6	Mohamad Armin Zahryl	Malaysia	13.85 [.845]	PB
4	3	Hsieh Yuan-kai	Chinese Taipei	13.85 [.848]	
5	2	John Cabang	Philippines	14.14	
6	5	Cheung Siu Hang	Hong Kong	14.34	PB
7	8	Leonid Pronzhenko	Tajikistan	14.60	PB
—	7	Lee Min-hyeok	South Korea	DQ	
				Wind: (+1.5 m/s)	

=== Final ===
Place	Lane	Athlete	Nation	Time	Notes
1st place, gold medalist(s)	4	Rachid Muratake	Japan	13.22	
2nd place, silver medalist(s)	5	Liu Junxi	China	13.31	
3rd place, bronze medalist(s)	6	Qin Weibo	China	13.45	SB
4	3	Oumar Doudai Abakar	Qatar	13.49	
5	2	David Yefremov	Kazakhstan	13.69	
6	8	Lin Yi-kai	Chinese Taipei	13.76	
7	7	Masoud Kamran	Iran	13.82	
—	1	Kim Ju-ho	South Korea	DNF	
				Wind: (+0.7 m/s)	
