= Athletics at the 2018 Asian Games – Men's 110 metres hurdles =

Men's 110 metres hurdles at the 2018 Asian Games
- Venue: Gelora Bung Karno Stadium
- Date: 27–28 August 2018
- Competitors: 18 from 14 nations

Medalists
gold medal	Xie Wenjun	China
silver medal	Chen Kuei-ru	Chinese Taipei
bronze medal	Shunya Takayama	Japan

The men's 110 metres hurdles competition at the 2018 Asian Games took place on 27 and 28 August 2018 at the Gelora Bung Karno Stadium, Jakarta, Indonesia.

== Schedule ==
All times are Western Indonesia Time (UTC+07:00)

Date	Time	Event
Monday, 27 August 2018	09:00	Round 1
Tuesday, 28 August 2018	18:35	Final

== Records ==
Prior to this competition, the existing world, Asian and Games records were as follows.

World Record	Aries Merritt (USA)	12.80	Brussels, Belgium	7 September 2012
Asian Record	Liu Xiang (CHN)	12.88	Lausanne, Switzerland	11 July 2006
Games Record	Liu Xiang (CHN)	13.09	Guangzhou, China	24 November 2010

== Results ==
=== Round 1 ===
- Qualification: First 2 in each heat (Q) and the next 2 fastest (q) advance to the final.

==== Heat 1 ====
- Wind: −0.3 m/s

Rank	Athlete	Time	Notes
1	Xie Wenjun (CHN)	13.64	Q
2	Taio Kanai (JPN)	13.81	Q
3	Chan Chung Wang (HKG)	13.84	
4	Rayzam Shah Wan Sofian (MAS)	14.15	
5	Anousone Xaysa (LAO)	14.27	
6	Apisit Puanglamyai (THA)	14.46	

==== Heat 2 ====
- Wind: −1.5 m/s

Rank	Athlete	Time	Notes
1	Shunya Takayama (JPN)	13.84	Q
2	Yang Wei-ting (TPE)	13.86	Q
3	Mohammed Saad (IRQ)	13.88	
4	Clinton Bautista (PHI)	14.38	
5	Lai Ho Tat (MAC)	14.62	
6	Vyacheslav Zems (KAZ)	14.64	

==== Heat 3 ====
- Wind: −0.5 m/s

Rank	Athlete	Time	Notes
1	Ahmed Al-Muwallad (KSA)	13.61	Q
2	Chen Kuei-ru (TPE)	13.63	Q
3	Kim Byoung-jun (KOR)	13.73	q
4	Zeng Jianhang (CHN)	13.78	q
5	Rio Maholtra (INA)	14.02	
6	David Yefremov (KAZ)	14.63	

=== Final ===
- Wind: 0.0 m/s

Rank	Athlete	Time	Notes
1st place, gold medalist(s)	Xie Wenjun (CHN)	13.34	
2nd place, silver medalist(s)	Chen Kuei-ru (TPE)	13.39	
3rd place, bronze medalist(s)	Shunya Takayama (JPN)	13.48	
4	Ahmed Al-Muwallad (KSA)	13.50	
5	Kim Byoung-jun (KOR)	13.57	
6	Zeng Jianhang (CHN)	13.65	
7	Taio Kanai (JPN)	13.74	
8	Yang Wei-ting (TPE)	13.75	
