= 2015 Asian Athletics Championships – Men's 110 metres hurdles =

The men's 110 metres hurdles event at the 2015 Asian Athletics Championships was held on the 3 of June.

== Medalists ==
Gold	Xie Wenjun; China
Silver	Abdulaziz Al-Mandeel; Kuwait
Bronze	Kim Byoung-jun; South Korea

== Results ==
=== Heats ===
First 2 in each heat (Q) and the next 2 fastest (q) qualified for the final.

Wind:
Heat 1: -0.8 m/s, Heat 2: -0.8 m/s, Heat 3: -0.1 m/s

Rank	Heat	Name	Nationality	Time	Notes
1	1	Xie Wenjun	China	13.55	Q
2	2	Yaqoub Al-Youha	Kuwait	13.66	Q
3	3	Abdulaziz Al-Mandeel	Kuwait	13.69	Q
4	3	Kim Byoung-jun	South Korea	13.70	Q
5	2	Zhang Honglin	China	13.79	Q
5	3	Jiang Fan	China	13.79	q
7	2	Yang Wei-Ting	Chinese Taipei	13.89	q
8	1	Jamras Rittidet	Thailand	13.92	Q
9	2	Hiroyuki Satō	Japan	14.04	
10	1	Ali Hussain Al-Zaki	Saudi Arabia	14.10	
11	1	Siddhanth Thingalaya	India	14.10	
12	1	Rayzam Shah Wan Sofian	Malaysia	14.11	
13	3	Takumu Furuya	Japan	14.15	
14	3	Ahmed Al-Muwallad	Saudi Arabia	14.18	
15	3	Muhammad Sajjad	Pakistan	14.33	
16	2	Chan Chung Wang	Hong Kong	14.41	
17	1	Tong Cheuk Pan	Hong Kong	14.46	
17	3	Iong Kim Fai	Macau	14.46	
19	2	Anousone Xaysa	Laos	14.60	
20	1	Lai Hotat Costa	Macau	14.88	

=== Final ===
Wind: -0.6 m/s

Rank	Lane	Name	Nationality	Result	Notes
1st place, gold medalist(s)	5	Xie Wenjun	China	13.56	
2nd place, silver medalist(s)	7	Abdulaziz Al-Mandeel	Kuwait	13.67	
3rd place, bronze medalist(s)	6	Kim Byoung-jun	South Korea	13.75	
4	9	Jamras Rittidet	Thailand	13.77	
5	2	Jiang Fan	China	13.85	
6	3	Yang Wei-Ting	Chinese Taipei	13.87	
7	8	Zhang Honglin	China	13.92	
	4	Yaqoub Al-Youha	Kuwait	DQ	R162.7
