= Athletics at the 2022 Asian Games – Men's 110 metres hurdles =

Men's 110 metres hurdles at the 2022 Asian Games
- Venue: Hangzhou Olympic Expo Main Stadium
- Date: 1–2 October 2023
- Competitors: 14 from 11 nations

Medalists
gold medal	Yaqoub Al-Youha	Kuwait
gold medal	Shunya Takayama	Japan
bronze medal	Xu Zhuoyi	China

The men's 110 metres hurdles competition at the 2022 Asian Games took place on 1 and 2 October 2023 at the HOC Stadium, Hangzhou.

== Schedule ==
All times are China Standard Time (UTC+08:00)

Date	Time	Event
Sunday, 1 October 2023	09:10	Round 1
Monday, 2 October 2023	20:15	Final

== Records ==
Prior to this competition, the existing world, Asian and Games records were as follows.

World Record	Aries Merritt (USA)	12.80	Brussels, Belgium	7 September 2012
Asian Record	Liu Xiang (CHN)	12.88	Lausanne, Switzerland	11 July 2006
Games Record	Liu Xiang (CHN)	13.09	Guangzhou, China	24 November 2010

== Results ==
Legend

- DNF — Did not finish

=== Round 1 ===
- Qualification: First 3 in each heat (Q) and the next 2 fastest (q) advance to the final.

==== Heat 1 ====
- Wind: −1.2 m/s

Rank	Athlete	Time	Notes
1	Yaqoub Al-Youha (KUW)	13.69	Q
2	Xu Zhuoyi (CHN)	13.72	Q
3	Shunya Takayama (JPN)	13.80	Q
4	Kim Gyeong-tae (KOR)	13.92	q
5	Natthaphon Dansungnoen (THA)	13.97	
6	Lee Ka Yiu (HKG)	14.20	
—	Chen Kuei-ru (TPE)	DNF	

==== Heat 2 ====
- Wind: −0.6 m/s

Rank	Athlete	Time	Notes
1	John Cabang (PHI)	13.70	Q
2	Shuhei Ishikawa (JPN)	13.71	Q
3	Zhu Shenglong (CHN)	13.74	Q
4	Ang Chen Xiang (SGP)	13.90	q
5	David Yefremov (KAZ)	14.03	
6	Mui Ching Yeung (HKG)	14.04	
—	Farhan Ilyas (PAK)	DNF	

=== Final ===
- Wind: −0.4 m/s

Rank	Athlete	Time	Notes
1st place, gold medalist(s)	Yaqoub Al-Youha (KUW)	13.41	
1st place, gold medalist(s)	Shunya Takayama (JPN)	13.41	
3rd place, bronze medalist(s)	Xu Zhuoyi (CHN)	13.50	
4	John Cabang (PHI)	13.62	
5	Shuhei Ishikawa (JPN)	13.63	
6	Zhu Shenglong (CHN)	13.73	
7	Kim Gyeong-tae (KOR)	13.73	
8	Ang Chen Xiang (SGP)	13.89	
