= List of Macanese records in athletics =

The following are the national records in athletics in Macau maintained by its national athletics federation: Associaçao de Atletismo de Macau (AAMC).

== Outdoor ==
Key to tables: Awaiting ratification Record not kept by AAMC Not ratified or later rescinded by AAMC

=== Men ===
Event	Record	Athlete	Date	Meet	Place	Ref.
100 m	10.53 (+2.0 m/s)	Chan Kin Wa	13 April 2024	3rd HKAAA Series Meet	Hong Kong	
200 m	21.45 (+1.5 m/s)	Chan Kin Wa	29 April 2023	HKAA Championships	Hong Kong	
400 m	47.61	Lei Vai Kun	21 July 1996		Hong Kong	
800 m	1:55.54 (Note: ratified by AAMC but not recognised by World Athletics)	Lou Wai Un	21 September 2021	National Games of China	Xi'an, China	
800 m	1:55.70	Lou Wai Un	25 April 2021		Zhaoqing, China	
1500 m	4:02.49 (Note: ratified by AAMC but not recognized by World Athletics)	Ye Shengtao	12 November 2023		Guanxi, China	
1500 m	4:04.99	Seng Tou Ip	1 April 2023	3rd HKAA Series Meeting	Hong Kong	
Mile (road)	4:31.44 (Note: by official result source; 4:31.4 by AAMC source)	Seng Tou Ip	1 October 2023	World Road Running Championships	Riga, Latvia	
3000 m	9:15.1 h	Wong Fan Wa	1992		Macau	
5000 m	15:33.41 (Note: by World Athletics source; 15:23.00 by federation source)	Lei Hong Wa	31 May 1992		Banciao, Chinese Taipei	
5 km (road)	16:34+	Leong Meng Tak	1 October 2023	World Road Running Championships	Riga, Latvia	
10,000 m	32:40.0 h	Fong Kim Fong	March 1989		Guangzhou, China	
10 km (road)	33:18	Iao Kuan Un	6 July 2019		Melbourne, Australia	
Half marathon	1:09:27	Lei Hong Wa	March 1993		Portugal	
Marathon	2:22:46	Wang Kun	24 March 2024	Wuxi Marathon	Wuxi, China	
110 m hurdles	14.23 (+1.0 m/s)	Iong Kim Fai	28 September 2014	Asian Games	Incheon, South Korea	
400 m hurdles	54.49	Zhang Zi-Cong	30 March 2024	National University Athletics Opens	Taipei City, Taiwan	
3000 m steeplechase	9:57.43	Leong Chin Hei	2023			
High jump	2.08 m	Wong Chi Wai	19 May 2016	Taiwan Open Championships	Taoyuan, Chinese Taipei	
Pole vault	3.30 m	Tam Kam Hung	1 February 1980		Hong Kong	
Long jump	7.25 m (+1.7 m/s)	Wong Ka Chun	24 June 2017		Hong Kong	
Triple jump	15.56 m (−0.1 m/s)	Si Kuan Wong	18 December 2011		Macau	
Shot put	14.70 m	Hou Fei	22 May 2011		Shanghai, China	
Discus throw	39.65 m	Wong Wai Wong	1 November 2005	East Asian Games	Macau	
Hammer throw	48.68 m	Hou Fei	13 December 2009	East Asian Games	Tseung Kwan O Sports Ground, Hong Kong	
Javelin throw	61.08 m	Ma Weng Chon	24 September 2023		Turnhout, Belgium	
Decathlon						
Decathlon	100m / Long jump / Shot put / High jump / 400m / 110m H / Discus / Pole vault / Javelin / 1500m					
20 km walk (road)						
50 km walk (road)						
4 × 100 m relay	40.77	Macau; Pao Hin Fong; Yang Zi Xian; Lao Iong; Lam Kin Hang	9 October 2013		Tianjin, China	
4 × 400 m relay	3:21.64	Macau; Lei Vai Kun; Chao Un Kei; Sou Chon Kin; Lai Neng Fong	24 April 2005		Zhongshan, China	
4 × 1500 m relay	13:48.00	Macau Keong Lei Chi; Hou Kuan Chi; Fat Wong Meng	3 May 2009		Hong Kong	

=== Women ===
Event	Record	Athlete	Date	Meet	Place	Ref.
100 m	11.54 (+0.4 m/s)	Loi Im Lan	17 November 2025	National Games of China	Guangzhou, China	
200 m	24.65 (+0.2 m/s)	Loi Im Lan	14 May 2023		Guangzhou, China	
400 m	57.07	Leong Ka Man	27 September 2014	Asian Games	Incheon, South Korea	
800 m	2:19.82	Leong Ka Man	15 September 2012		Tianjin, China	
1500 m	4:52.92	Hoi Long	27 November 2010		Macau	
3000 m	10:39.99	Long Hoi	20 July 2013		Macau	
5000 m	18:28.60 (Note: by AAMC source; 18:28.6 h by World Athletics source)	Hoi Long	4 October 2015		Taipei, Chinese Taipei	
5 km (road)	19:50+	Hoi Long	26 March 2016	World Half Marathon Championships	Cardiff, United Kingdom	
10,000 m	38:52.01 (Note: ratified by AAMC; not recognized by World Athletics)	Hoi Long	22 October 2021		Xi'an, China	
10,000 m	38:57.94 (Note: recognized by World Athletics)	Hoi Long	7 September 2009		Taipei, Taiwan	
10 km (road)	38:55	Hoi Long	11 April 2021	Macao International 10K	Macau	
15 km (road)	1:01:52+	Hoi Long	26 March 2016	World Half Marathon Championships	Cardiff, United Kingdom	
20 km (road)	1:23:4+	Hoi Long	26 March 2016	World Half Marathon Championships	Cardiff, United Kingdom	
Half marathon	1:23:05	Hoi Long	5 December 2021	Macau Galaxy Entertainment International Half Marathon	Macau	
Marathon	2:55:05	Hoi Long	1 December 2019	Macau International Marathon	Macau	
100 m hurdles	15.49 (+0.4 m/s)	Cheng Ut I	23 April 2017		Hong Kong	
400 m hurdles	1:08.44	Tse Ioi San	3 May 1997		Lisbon, Portugal	
3000 m steeplechase	13:14.89 (Note: not ratified by AAMC but recognized by World Athletics)	Ao Leong Wai San	22 April 2017		Hong Kong	
High jump	1.65 m (Note: ratified by AAMC; not recognized by World Athletics)	Wong Wang-lok	6 March 2021		Macau	
High jump	1.65 m	Wong Wang-lok	7 June 2023	Asian U20 Championships	Yecheon, South Korea	
High jump	1.62 m (Note: recognized by World Athletics)	Ng Man I	4 May 1997		Lisbon, Portugal	
Pole vault						
Long jump	5.58 m NWI	Sou I Man				
Triple jump	11.15 m (+0.4 m/s)	Sou I Man	29 September 2019		Hong Kong	
Shot put	12.74 m	Wong Kit Man	13 March 2005		Macau	
Discus throw	39.05 m	Hong Lei Lei	4 June 2005		Hong Kong	
Hammer throw						
Javelin throw	44.08 m	Liu Dan	19 January 2019	Hong Kong Athletics Series	Hong Kong	
Javelin throw	54.14 m	Liu Dan	11 April 2004	Chinese U18 Championships	Yichun, China	
Heptathlon						
Heptathlon	100m H / High jump / Shot put / 200m / Long jump / Javelin / 800m					
20 km walk (road)						
50 km walk (road)						
4 × 100 m relay	48.40	Macau; Loi Im Lan; Cheong Im Leng; Chan Man Wai; Ng Weng Ian	9 April 2017		Guangzhou, China	
4 × 400 m relay	4:05.31	Lam Choi Leng; Ng Weng Ian; Wong Pui San; Loi Im Lan	26 May 2017		Macau	

=== Mixed ===
Event	Record	Athlete	Date	Meet	Place	Ref.
4 × 400 m relay	3:35.67	Háo Jiāng School; Huang Qingsen; Liang Zhuocheng; Mei Qiqi; Li Jiaer	22 May 2024		Macau	

== Indoor ==
=== Men ===
Event	Record	Athlete	Date	Meet	Place	Ref.
60 m	6.81	Chan Kin Wa	18 February 2024 (Note: by official result source; 17 February by AAMC source, a typo)	Asian Championships	Tehran, Iran	
200 m	22.42	Chao Un Kei	14 March 2003	World Championships	Birmingham, United Kingdom	
400 m	49.66	Chao Un Kei	31 October 2007	Asian Indoor Games	Macau	
800 m	2:00.79	Li Yuxuan	6 February 2026	Asian Championships	Tianjin, China	
1500 m	4:14.11	Lei Chi Keong	11 February 2007		Macau	
3000 m	9:20.90	Seng Tou Ip	26 January 2025	Campeonato Distrital de Coimbra	Pombal, Portugal	
60 m hurdles	8.17	Lai Ho Tat Costa	2 February 2018	Asian Championships	Tehran, Iran	
High jump	2.00 m	Ng Chi Kit	6 February 2026	Asian Championships	Tianjin, China	
Pole vault						
Long jump	7.09 m	Wong Ka-Chun	23 February 2019		Nanjing, China	
Triple jump	14.97 m	Si Kuan Wong	1 November 2007	Asian Indoor Games	Macau	
Shot put	13.94 m (Note: by World Athletics source; 13.97 m by AAMC source)	Hou Fei	2 November 2009	Asian Indoor Games	Hanoi, Vietnam	
Heptathlon						
Heptathlon	60m / Long jump / Shot put / High jump / 60m H / Pole vault / 1000m					
5000 m walk						
4 × 400 m relay	3:25.93 (Note: by World Athletics source; 3:25.9 by AAMC source)	Macau; Sou Chon Kin; Wong Man Hou; Chap Chon In; Chao Un Kei	31 October 2007	Asian Indoor Games	Macau	

=== Women ===
Event	Record	Athlete	Date	Meet	Place	Ref.
60 m	7.45	Loi Im Lan	10 February 2023	Asian Championships	Astana, Kazakhstan	
60 m	7.40	Loi Im Lan	7 March 2026	National Grand Prix 1	Xi'an, China	
200 m	24.47 (Note: recognized by World Athletics but not ratified by AAMC)	Loi Im Lan	4 March 2017		Macau	
200 m	33.30	Leong lok leng	29 February 2004		Budapest, Hungary	
400 m	58.85	Lam Ka Im	30 October 2007	Asian Indoor Games	Macau	
400 m	57.23	Loi Im Lan	5 March 2017		Macau	
800 m	2:21.92 (Note: by World Athletics source; 2:21.9 by AAMC source)	Leong Ka Man	19 February 2012	Asian Championships	Hangzhou, China	
1500 m	5:22.84 (Note: by World Athletics source; 5:23.0 by AAMC source)	Cheng Ka I	11 February 2007		Macau	
3000 m						
60 m hurdles	11.09	Tam Sok Teng	11 February 2007		Macau	
High jump	1.50 m	Ng Ka Man	31 October 2007	Asian Indoor Games	Macau	
High jump	1.50 m	Ng Ka Ian	31 October 2007	Asian Indoor Games	Macau	
Pole vault						
Long jump	5.16 m	Sou I Man	3 February 2018		Tehran, Iran	
Long jump	5.30 m	Sou I Man	12 February 2023	Asian Championships	Astana, Kazakhstan	
Triple jump						
Shot put	12.10 m					
Shot put	12.31 m (Note: not ratified by AAMC but recognized by World Athletics)	Wong Kit Man	15 November 2005	Asian Indoor Games	Pattaya, Thailand	
Pentathlon						
Pentathlon	60m H / High jump / Shot put / Long jump / 800m					
3000 m walk						
4 × 400 m relay	3:58.85 (Note: by World Athletics source; 3:59.0 by AAMC source) (Note: outdoor mark ratified as absolute record)	Macau; Lam Ka Im; Iong Pui I Cheong Im Wa; Leong Ka Man	1 November 2007	Asian Indoor Games	Macau	
