= Xu Zhuoyi =

Chinese hurdler (born 2003)

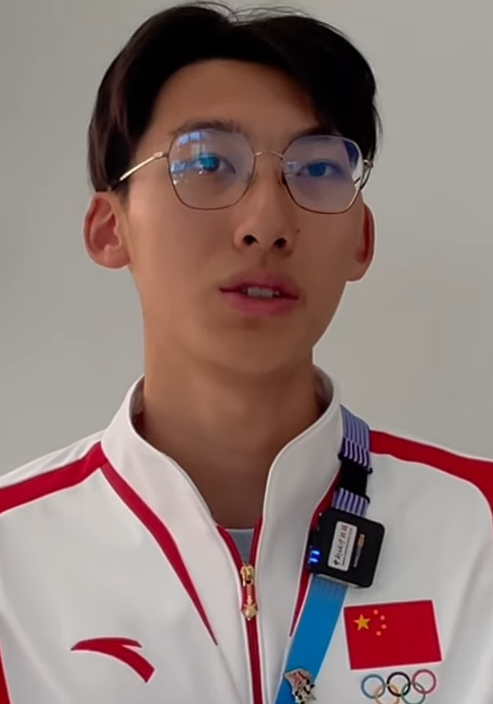
- Xu in 2024

Personal information
- Native name: Chinese: 徐卓一
- Nickname: Glasses Flyer
- Nationality: China
- Born: 21 August 2003 (age 22)
- Home town: Songjiang, Shanghai, China

Sport
- Sport: Athletics
- Event(s): 60 metres hurdles 110 metres hurdles

Achievements and titles
- Personal best(s): 60mH: 7.72 (2023); 110mH: 13.22 (2024)
Medal record
Men's athletics
Representing China
Asian Games
Bronze medal – third place	2023 Hangzhou	110 m hurdles
Asian Championships
Silver medal – second place	2023 Bangkok	110 m hurdles
- Updated on 6 April 2024

Xu Zhuoyi (Chinese: 徐卓一; born 21 August 2003) is a Chinese hurdler specializing in the 110 metres hurdles. He is an Asian Championships silver medallist and Asian Games bronze medallist. He is nicknamed "the glasses flyer" for his signature look while running.

== Career ==
In May 2023, Xu won the Yangtze River Delta Elite Meeting by setting personal bests in both the semifinals and finals. Two months later, Xu won his first international medal at the Asian Athletics Championships, taking silver behind Shunya Takayama. At the 2022 Asian Games, held in October 2023 due to the COVID-19 pandemic in Asia, Xu won a bronze medal.

== Personal life ==
Xu is originally from Songjiang, Shanghai, where he attended Songjiang District Fangta Primary School and Songjiang No. 7 Middle School. He has been given the nickname "glasses flyer" (Chinese: 眼镜飞人, lit. 'glasses flying person'), for his habit of wearing glasses when he races.

== Statistics ==
=== Personal best progression ===
110m hurdles progression
#	Mark	Pl.	Competition	Venue	Date	Ref.
1	14.34 (+0.1 m/s)	(silver) (Heat 2)	Yangtze River Delta Elite Meeting	Shaoxing, China	7 Apr 2021	
2	14.17 (−0.1 m/s)	4th	Yangtze River Delta Elite Meeting	Shaoxing, China	7 Apr 2021	
3	14.07 (+0.2 m/s)	(gold) (Heat 1)	Division Invitational Tournament - East China	Fuzhou, China	22 May 2021	
4	14.05 (−0.1 m/s)	2nd place, silver medalist(s)	Division Invitational Tournament - East China	Fuzhou, China	22 May 2021	
5	14.01 (+0.5 m/s)	5th (Heat 1)	Events Test Competition & Shanghai Xinzhuang Base Permit Meeting	Shanghai, China	14 Apr 2022	
6	13.91 (+1.5 m/s)	3rd place, bronze medalist(s)	Events Test Competition & Shanghai Xinzhuang Base Permit Meeting	Shanghai, China	14 Apr 2022	
7	13.76 (+1.8 m/s)	(bronze) (Heat 1)	Shanghai Xinzhuang Base Permit Meeting	Shanghai, China	5 May 2022	
8	13.63 (−0.3 m/s)	(gold) (Heat 2)	National Grand Prix	Rizhao, China	26 Apr 2023	
9	13.51 (+0.1 m/s)	(gold) (Heat 1)	Yangtze River Delta Sprints, Hurdles, Jumps and Relays Meeting	Huzhou, China	8 May 2023	
10	13.47 (−1.0 m/s)	1st place, gold medalist(s)	Yangtze River Delta Sprints, Hurdles, Jumps and Relays Meeting	Huzhou, China	8 May 2023	
11	13.41 (−1.6 m/s)	1st place, gold medalist(s)	National Grand Prix	Taizhou, Jiangsu, China	26 May 2023	
12	13.39 (+0.6 m/s)	2nd place, silver medalist(s)	Asian Athletics Championships	Bangkok, Thailand	13 Jul 2023	
