= 2023 Asian Athletics Championships – Men's 110 metres hurdles =

Men's 110 metres hurdles at the 2023 Asian Athletics Championships
- Venue: National Stadium
- Location: Bangkok, Thailand
- Dates: 13 July (heats); 14 July (final)
- Competitors: 21 from 15 nations
- Winning time: 13.29

Medalists
gold medal	Shunya Takayama	Japan
silver medal	Xu Zhuoyi	China
bronze medal	Yaqoub Al-Yoha	Kuwait

The men's 110 metres hurdles event at the 2023 Asian Athletics Championships was held on 13 and 14 July.

== Records ==
Records before the 2023 Asian Athletics Championships
Record	Athlete (nation)	Time (s)	Location	Date
World record	Aries Merritt (USA)	12.80	Brussels, Belgium	7 September 2012
Asian record	Liu Xiang (CHN)	12.88	Lausanne, Switzerland	11 July 2006
Championship record	Xie Wenjun (CHN)	13.21	Guangzhou, China	24 April 2019
World leading	Rasheed Broadbell (JAM)	12.94	Kingston, Jamaica	9 July 2023
Asian leading	Shunsuke Izumiya (JPN)	13.04	Osaka, Japan	4 June 2023

== Results ==
=== Heats ===
Held on 13 July

Qualification rule: First 3 in each heat (Q) and the next 6 fastest (q) qualified for the final.

Wind:
Heat 1: 0.0 m/s, Heat 2: 0.0 m/, Heat 3: 0.0 m/s

Rank	Heat	Name	Nationality	Time	Notes
1	3	Xu Zhuoyi	China	13.57	Q
2	3	Yaqoub Al-Yoha	Kuwait	13.62	Q
3	2	Ning Xiaohan	China	13.62	Q
4	2	Taiga Yokochi	Japan	13.63	Q
5	1	Shunya Takayama	Japan	13.70	Q
6	1	John Cabang	Philippines	13.70	Q
7	3	Nathapol Dansoongnern	Thailand	13.71	q, PB
8	1	David Yefremov	Kazakhstan	13.85	q
9	1	Mohd Rizzua Haizad Muhamad	Malaysia	13.85	PB
10	1	Chen Kuei-ju	Chinese Taipei	13.89	
11	2	Chen Xiang Ang	Singapore	13.99	
12	3	Clinton Bautista	Philippines	13.99	
13	3	Kim Kyung-tae	South Korea	14.02	
14	2	Oumar Abakar	Qatar	14.21	
15	2	Ergash Normurodov	Uzbekistan	14.26	
16	2	Lee Ka Yiu	Hong Kong	14.36	
17	3	Mui Ching Yeung	Hong Kong	14.38	
18	2	Khanmalaiphone Bounyaveun	Laos	14.83	PB
19	3	Zaid Al-Awamleh	Jordan	15.03	
20	1	Detaudom Suwannachairob	Thailand	15.29	PB
	1	Saeed Othman Zamzoun Al-Absi	Qatar	DNF	

=== Final ===
Held on 14 July
Wind: +0.6 m/s

Rank	Lane	Name	Nationality	Time	Notes
1st place, gold medalist(s)	4	Shunya Takayama	Japan	13.29	
2nd place, silver medalist(s)	6	Xu Zhuoyi	China	13.39	PB
3rd place, bronze medalist(s)	5	Yaqoub Al-Yoha	Kuwait	13.56	
4	8	John Cabang	Philippines	13.56	PB
5	7	Taiga Yokochi	Japan	13.59	
6	2	David Yefremov	Kazakhstan	13.60	
7	1	Nathapol Dansoongnern	Thailand	13.66	PB
8	3	Ning Xiaohan	China	13.81	
