= Taio Kanai =

Japanese hurdler (born 1995)

Personal information
- Born: 28 September 1995 (age 30) Hakodate, Japan
- Education: Hosei University
- Height: 1.79 m (5 ft 10 in)

Sport
- Sport: Athletics
- Event: 110 metres hurdles
- Club: Mizuno

Taio Kanai (金井大旺, Kanai Taiō; born 28 September 1995) is a Japanese athlete specialising in the high hurdles. He finished fourth at the 2017 Summer Universiade.

His personal best in the 110 metres hurdles was 13.34 (+0.3 m/s) set in Machida in 2020, until his 13.16 (+1.7) national record set in Hiroshima in 2021.

== International competitions ==
Year	Competition	Venue	Position	Event	Notes
Representing Japan
2014	Asian Junior Championships	Taipei, Taiwan	1st	110 m hurdles (99 cm)	13.33
2014	World Junior Championships	Eugene, United States	11th (sf)	110 m hurdles (99 cm)	13.85
2017	Universiade	Taipei, Taiwan	4th	110 m hurdles	13.69
2018	Asian Games	Jakarta, Indonesia	7th	110 m hurdles	13.74
2018	Continental Cup	Ostrava, Czech Republic	6th	110 m hurdles	13.72^{1}
2019	Asian Championships	Doha, Qatar	5th	110 m hurdles	13.64
2019	World Championships	Doha, Qatar	29th (h)	110 m hurdles	13.74
2021	Olympic Games	Tokyo, Japan	24th (sf)	110 m hurdles	26.11

^{1}Representing Asia-Pacific
