= Genta Masuno =

Japanese hurdler (born 1993)

Personal information
- Born: 24 May 1993 (age 32) Hakodate, Hokkaido
- Education: International Budo University
- Height: 1.82 m (6 ft 0 in)
- Weight: 76 kg (168 lb)

Sport
- Sport: Track and field
- Event: 110 metres hurdles

Genta Masuno (Japanese: 増野 元太; born 24 May 1993 in Hakodate) is a Japanese athlete specialising in the 110 metres hurdles. He won the bronze medal at the 2015 Summer Universiade. In addition, he finished fourth at the 2014 Asian Games.

His personal best in the event is 13.58 seconds (+0.4 m/s) set in Fukushima in 2014.

== Competition record ==
Year	Competition	Venue	Position	Event	Notes
Representing Japan
2012	Asian Junior Championships	Colombo, Sri Lanka	5th	110 m hurdles (99 cm)	14.00
2014	Asian Games	Incheon, South Korea	4th	110 m hurdles	13.66
2015	Universiade	Gwangju, South Korea	3rd	110 m hurdles	13.69
2017	World Championships	London, United Kingdom	20th (sf)	110 m hurdles	13.79
2018	World Indoor Championships	Birmingham, United Kingdom	32nd (h)	60 m hurdles	7.97
