= Zhang Honglin =

Chinese hurdler

Personal information
- Born: 12 January 1994 (age 32)

Sport
- Country: China
- Sport: Track and field
- Event: 110 metres hurdles
Medal record
Men's athletics
Representing China
Asian Indoor Championships
Bronze medal – third place	2016 Doha	60 m hurdles
- Updated on 29 August 2015

Zhang Honglin (born 12 January 1994) is a male Chinese hurdler. He competed in the 110 metres hurdles event at the 2015 World Championships in Athletics in Beijing, but did not finish his heat.

His personal bests are 13.53 seconds in the 110 metres hurdles (+1.1 m/s, Shanghai 2015) and 7.78 seconds in the 60 metres hurdles (Shanghai 2015).

== Competition record ==
Year	Competition	Venue	Position	Event	Notes
Representing China
2015	Asian Championships	Wuhan, China	7th	110 m hurdles	13.92
2015	World Championships	Beijing, China	–	110 m hurdles	DNF
2016	Asian Indoor Championships	Doha, Qatar	3rd	60 m hurdles	7.73
2018	Asian Indoor Championships	Tehran, Iran	8th	60 m hurdles	7.98

== See also ==
- China at the 2015 World Championships in Athletics
