= Iong Kim Fai =

Macanese hurdler (born 1989)

Iong Kim Fai (Chinese: 容儉輝, born 12 January 1989) is a Macanese athlete specialising in the 110 metres hurdles. He represented his country at two outdoor and two indoor World Championships. World record holder

He has personal bests of 14.23 seconds in the 110 metres hurdles and 8.34 seconds in the 60 metres hurdles (both set in 2014). The former is a current national record.

== Competition record ==
Year	Competition	Venue	Position	Event	Notes
Representing Macau
2006	Asian Junior Championships	Macau, China	18th (h)	110 m hurdles	17.08
2007	Asian Indoor Games	Macau, China	13th (h)	60 m hurdles	9.13
2009	Lusophony Games	Lisbon, Portugal	–	110 m hurdles	DNF
2009	Asian Indoor Games	Hanoi, Vietnam	15th (h)	60 m hurdles	8.37
2009	East Asian Games	Hong Kong, China	10th (h)	110 m hurdles	15.22
2010	World Indoor Championships	Doha, Qatar	28th (h)	60 m hurdles	8.67
2010	Asian Games	Guangzhou, China	10th (h)	110 m hurdles	14.78
2011	Asian Championships	Kobe, Japan	28th (h)	100 m	12.61
2011	Universiade	Shenzhen, China	30th (h)	110 m hurdles	15.29
2011	World Championships	Daegu, South Korea	32nd (h)	110 m hurdles	15.35
2012	World Indoor Championships	Istanbul, Turkey	27th (h)	60 m hurdles	8.41
2013	Universiade	Kazan, Russia	19th (h)	110 m hurdles	15.19
2013	World Championships	Moscow, Russia	32nd (h)	110 m hurdles	15.10
2013	East Asian Games	Tianjin, China	9th	110 m hurdles	14.49
2014	Lusophony Games	Goa, India	1st	110 m hurdles	14.47
2014	Asian Indoor Championships	Hangzhou, China	12th (h)	60 m hurdles	8.44
2014	World Indoor Championships	Sopot, Poland	27th (h)	60 m hurdles	8.34
2014	Asian Games	Incheon, South Korea	13th (h)	110 m hurdles	14.23
2014	Asian Games	Incheon, South Korea	7th	4 × 100 m relay	41.11
2015	Asian Championships	Wuhan, China	17th (h)	110 m hurdles	14.46
