= Athletics at the 2015 Summer Universiade – Men's 110 metres hurdles =

The men's 110 metres hurdles event at the 2015 Summer Universiade was held on 10 and 11 July at the Gwangju Universiade Main Stadium.

== Medalists ==
| Gold | Silver | Bronze |
|---|---|---|
| Greggmar Swift; Barbados | Konstantin Shabanov; Russia | Genta Masuno; Japan |

== Results ==
=== Heats ===
Qualification: First 2 in each heat (Q) and next 2 fastest (q) qualified for the final.

Wind:
Heat 1: +1.0 m/s, Heat 2: +0.3 m/s, Heat 3: -0.4 m/s

| Rank | Heat | Name | Nationality | Time | Notes |
|---|---|---|---|---|---|
| 1 | 2 | Greggmar Swift | Barbados | 13.65 | Q |
| 2 | 1 | Milan Ristić | Serbia | 13.74 | Q |
| 3 | 2 | Genta Masuno | Japan | 13.76 | Q |
| 4 | 2 | Konstantin Shabanov | Russia | 13.76 | q |
| 5 | 3 | Kim Byoung-jun | South Korea | 13.79 | Q |
| 6 | 1 | Tobias Furer | Switzerland | 13.82 | Q |
| 7 | 2 | Milan Trajkovic | Cyprus | 13.96 | q |
| 8 | 1 | Denis Hanjoul | Belgium | 13.98 | |
| 9 | 3 | Damian Czykier | Poland | 14.00 | Q |
| 10 | 1 | Philipp Shabanov | Russia | 14.04 | |
| 10 | 2 | Pedro Bustamante | Mexico | 14.04 | |
| 12 | 1 | Alexander Brorsson | Sweden | 14.05 | |
| 13 | 3 | Nicholas Hough | Australia | 14.11 | |
| 14 | 2 | Cosmin Dumitrache | Romania | 14.41 | |
| 15 | 3 | Agustín Carrera | Argentina | 14.42 | |
| 16 | 1 | Dondre Echols | United States | 14.52 | |
| 17 | 3 | Calvin Arsenault | Canada | 14.55 | |

=== Final ===
Wind: +0.7 m/s

Official Video

| Rank | Lane | Name | Nationality | Time | Notes |
|---|---|---|---|---|---|
| 1st place, gold medalist(s) | 6 | Greggmar Swift | Barbados | 13.43 | |
| 2nd place, silver medalist(s) | 2 | Konstantin Shabanov | Russia | 13.57 | SB |
| 3rd place, bronze medalist(s) | 3 | Genta Masuno | Japan | 13.69 | |
| 4 | 7 | Damian Czykier | Poland | 13.72 | SB |
| 5 | 5 | Milan Ristić | Serbia | 13.78 | |
| 6 | 4 | Milan Trajkovic | Cyprus | 13.78 | SB |
| 7 | 8 | Tobias Furer | Switzerland | 13.94 | |
| | 1 | Kim Byoung-jun | South Korea | DNS | |
