= Athletics at the 2020 Summer Olympics – Men's 110 metres hurdles =

Men's 110 metres hurdles at the Games of the XXXII Olympiad
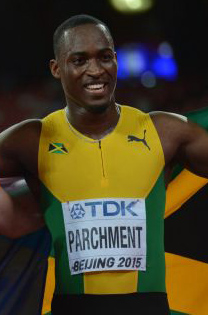
- Gold medalist Hansle Parchment (shown at 2015 World Championships)
- Venue: Olympic Stadium
- Dates: 3 August 2021 (round 1); 4 August 2021 (semifinals); 5 August 2021 (final)
- Competitors: 40 from 29 nations
- Winning time: 13.04

Medalists
1st place, gold medalist(s)		Hansle Parchment	Jamaica
2nd place, silver medalist(s)		Grant Holloway	United States
3rd place, bronze medalist(s)		Ronald Levy	Jamaica

The men's 110 metres hurdles event at the 2020 Summer Olympics took place between 3 and 5 August 2021 at the Olympic Stadium. Approximately forty athletes were expected to compete; the exact number was dependent on how many nations used universality places to enter athletes in addition to the 40 qualifying through time or ranking (1 universality place was used in 2016). 40 athletes from 29 nations competed. Hansle Parchment of Jamaica won the gold medal, the nation's second consecutive victory in the event. His countryman Ronald Levy took bronze. American Grant Holloway earned silver, placing the United States back on the podium in the event after the nation missed the medals for the first time in Rio 2016 (excluding the boycotted 1980 Games).

== Summary ==
Coming in to the Olympics, Grant Holloway was the clear favorite. He was undefeated and tickled the world record with a 12.81 to win the US Trials, the #2 time in history. He was the only athlete under 13 seconds all year. His closest competitor on the yearly list was defending champion Omar McLeod from the heats of the Jamaican Olympic Trials. But McLeod failed to qualify for the Olympics from the strong field in those trials. McLeod tried to appeal to change the team makeup, but which deserving athlete would be left home to make room for him? His appeal failed. As expected, Holloway had the fastest times in the heats and the semis. 2012 bronze medalist Hansle Parchment was also in contention.

In the final, the script looked the same. Holloway was first out of the blocks, first over the first hurdle and had a clear lead over the closely matched wall of athletes behind him. By the fourth hurdle, Holloway had close to a metre lead, Ronald Levy then Andrew Pozzi emerged in second and third. Devon Allen and Hansle Parchment were close behind. Over the next three hurdles, Parchment made a big move to separate from the others, still a metre down on Holloway. Over the final three hurdles, Holloway lost his momentum. Parchment and the wall gained steadily. Holloway was still first over the last hurdle, but the thundering herd was approaching. Parchment went by with 10 metres to go. The next was Levy but Holloway executed a better lean at the finish, officially credited with .01 advantage over Levy to take silver. Two of the three people who beat McLeod at the Jamaican trials ended up on the podium.

== Background ==
This was the 29th appearance of the event, which is one of 12 athletics events to have been held at every Summer Olympics.

Comoros and Hong Kong competed in the men's 110 metres hurdles for the first time. The United States made its 28th appearance, most of any nation (having missed only the boycotted 1980 Games).

== Qualification ==
A National Olympic Committee (NOC) could enter up to 3 qualified athletes in the men's 110 metres hurdles event if all athletes meet the entry standard or qualify by ranking during the qualifying period. (The limit of 3 has been in place since the 1930 Olympic Congress.) The qualifying standard is 13.32 seconds. This standard was "set for the sole purpose of qualifying athletes with exceptional performances unable to qualify through the IAAF World Rankings pathway." The world rankings, based on the average of the best five results for the athlete over the qualifying period and weighted by the importance of the meet, will then be used to qualify athletes until the cap of 40 is reached.

The qualifying period was originally from 1 May 2019 to 29 June 2020. Due to the COVID-19 pandemic, the period was suspended from 6 April 2020 to 30 November 2020, with the end date extended to 29 June 2021. The world rankings period start date was also changed from 1 May 2019 to 30 June 2020; athletes who had met the qualifying standard during that time were still qualified, but those using world rankings would not be able to count performances during that time. The qualifying time standards could be obtained in various meets during the given period that have the approval of the IAAF. Only outdoor meets are eligible. The most recent Area Championships may be counted in the ranking, even if not during the qualifying period.

NOCs can also use their universality place—each NOC can enter one male athlete regardless of time if they had no male athletes meeting the entry standard for an athletics event—in the 110 metres hurdles.

Entry number: 40.

Qualification standard	No. of athletes	NOC	Nominated athletes
Entry standard – 13.32	3	France	Wilhem Belocian; Aurel Manga; Pascal Martinot-Lagarde
Entry standard – 13.32	3	Jamaica	Ronald Levy; Hansle Parchment; Damion Thomas
Entry standard – 13.32	3	Japan	Shunsuke Izumiya; Taio Kanai; Shunya Takayama
Entry standard – 13.32	3	United States	Devon Allen; Grant Holloway; Daniel Roberts
Entry standard – 13.32	2	Brazil	Gabriel Constantino; Eduardo de Deus
Entry standard – 13.32	2	Spain	Asier Martínez; Orlando Ortega
Entry standard – 13.32	1	ROC	Sergey Shubenkov
Entry standard – 13.32	1	Barbados	Shane Brathwaite
Entry standard – 13.32	1	Belarus	Vitali Parakhonka
Entry standard – 13.32	1	Belgium	Michael Obasuyi
Entry standard – 13.32	1	China	Xie Wenjun
Entry standard – 13.32	1	Cyprus	Milan Trajkovic
Entry standard – 13.32	1	Finland	Elmo Lakka
Entry standard – 13.32	1	Great Britain	Andrew Pozzi
Entry standard – 13.32	1	Italy	Paolo Dal Molin
Entry standard – 13.32	1	South Africa	Antonio Alkana
World ranking	1	Australia	Nicholas Hough
World ranking	1	Brazil	Rafael Henrique Pereira
World ranking	1	Chinese Taipei	Chen Kuei-ru
World ranking	1	Germany	Gregor Traber
World ranking	1	Great Britain	David King
World ranking	1	Greece	Konstantinos Douvalidis
World ranking	1	Hungary	Valdó Szűcs
World ranking	1	Italy	Hassane Fofana
World ranking	1	Kuwait	Yaqoub Al-Youha
World ranking	1	Poland	Damian Czykier
World ranking	1	Switzerland	Jason Joseph
Universality places	1	Comoros	Fadane Hamadi
Universality places	1	Hong Kong	Chan Chung Wang
Universality places	1	Mauritius	Jérémie Lararaudeuse
Total	40		

== Competition format ==
The event continued to use the three-round format used previously in 1908–1956, 1964–1984, and since 2012.

== Records ==
Prior to this competition, the existing global and area records were as follows.

World record	Aries Merritt (USA)	12.80	Brussels, Belgium	7 September 2012
Olympic record	Liu Xiang (CHN)	12.91	Athens, Greece	27 August 2004
World Leading	Grant Holloway (USA)	12.81	Eugene, Oregon, United States	26 June 2021

Area	Time (s)	Wind	Athlete	Nation
Africa (records)	13.11	+1.8	Antonio Alkana	South Africa
Asia (records)	12.88	+1.1	Liu Xiang	China
Europe (records)	12.91	+0.5	Colin Jackson	Great Britain
North, Central America and the Caribbean (records)	12.80 WR	+0.3	Aries Merritt	United States
Oceania (records)	13.29	+0.6	Kyle Vander Kuyp	Australia
South America (records)	13.18	+0.8	Gabriel Constantino	Brazil

== Schedule ==
All times are Japan Standard Time (UTC+9)

The men's 110 metres hurdles took place over three consecutive days.

Date	Time	Round
Tuesday, 3 August 2021	19:00	Round 1
Wednesday, 4 August 2021	9:00	Semifinals
Thursday, 5 August 2021	9:00	Final

== Results ==
=== Round 1 ===
Qualification Rules: First 4 in each heat (Q) and the next 4 fastest (q) advance to the Semifinals.

==== Heat 1 ====
Rank	Lane	Athlete	Nation	Time	Notes
1	4	Ronald Levy	Jamaica	13.17	Q
2	6	Jason Joseph	Switzerland	13.31	Q, SB
3	9	Valdó Szűcs	Hungary	13.50 (13.496)	Q
4	2	Andrew Pozzi	Great Britain	13.50 (13.500)	Q
5	5	Gabriel Constantino	Brazil	13.55	q
6	8	Michael Obasuyi	Belgium	13.65	
7	7	Louis François Mendy	Senegal	13.84	SB
—	3	Wilhem Belocian	France	DQ	

==== Heat 2 ====
Rank	Lane	Athlete	Nation	Time	Notes
1	7	Asier Martínez	Spain	13.32	Q
2	5	Daniel Roberts	United States	13.41	Q
3	8	Damion Thomas	Jamaica	13.54	Q
4	2	Milan Trajkovic	Cyprus	13.59	Q, SB
5	9	Vitali Parakhonka	Belarus	13.61	
6	4	Shane Brathwaite	Barbados	13.64	
7	3	Yaqoub Al-Youha	Kuwait	13.69	SB
8	6	Hassane Fofana	Italy	13.70	

==== Heat 3 ====
Rank	Lane	Athlete	Nation	Time	Notes
1	9	Grant Holloway	United States	13.02	Q
2	7	Hansle Parchment	Jamaica	13.23	Q
3	3	Nicholas Hough	Australia	13.57	Q
4	5	Damian Czykier	Poland	13.61	Q
5	4	Gregor Traber	Germany	13.65	
6	2	Shunya Takayama	Japan	13.98	
7	1	Jérémie Lararaudeuse	Mauritius	14.03	PB
8	8	Fadane Hamadi	Comoros	14.99	
—	6	Sergey Shubenkov	ROC	DNS	

==== Heat 4 ====
Rank	Lane	Athlete	Nation	Time	Notes
1	8	Aurel Manga	France	13.24	Q, =PB
2	6	Shunsuke Izumiya	Japan	13.28	Q
3	4	Rafael Henrique Pereira	Brazil	13.46	Q
4	2	Xie Wenjun	China	13.51	Q
5	3	Chen Kuei-ru	Chinese Taipei	13.53	q, SB
6	1	David King	Great Britain	13.55	q
7	9	Eddie Lovett	Virgin Islands	14.17	SB
8	7	Chan Chung Wang	Hong Kong	14.23	
—	5	Orlando Ortega	Spain	DNS	

==== Heat 5 ====
Rank	Lane	Athlete	Nation	Time	Notes
1	5	Devon Allen	United States	13.21	Q
2	3	Pascal Martinot-Lagarde	France	13.37	Q, SB
3	7	Taio Kanai	Japan	13.41	Q
4	8	Paolo Dal Molin	Italy	13.44	Q
5	6	Elmo Lakka	Finland	13.48	q
6	4	Antonio Alkana	South Africa	13.55	SB
7	2	Konstantinos Douvalidis	Greece	13.63	SB
8	9	Eduardo de Deus	Brazil	13.78	

=== Semifinals ===
Qualification Rules: First 2 in each heat (Q) and the next two fastest (q) advance to the final.

==== Semifinal 1 ====
Rank	Lane	Athlete	Nation	Reaction	Time	Notes
1	7	Ronald Levy	Jamaica	0.154	13.23	Q
2	4	Pascal Martinot-Lagarde	France	0.155	13.25	Q, SB
3	6	Asier Martínez	Spain	0.150	13.27	q, PB
4	8	Andrew Pozzi	Great Britain	0.148	13.32	q
5	5	Daniel Roberts	United States	0.195	13.33	
6	2	Damian Czykier	Poland	0.152	13.63	
7	9	Nicholas Hough	Australia	0.163	13.88	
8	3	Gabriel Constantino	Brazil	0.159	13.89	

==== Semifinal 2 ====
Rank	Lane	Athlete	Nation	Reaction	Time	Notes
1	5	Devon Allen	United States	0.121	13.18	Q
2	6	Aurel Manga	France	0.151	13.24	Q, =PB
3	8	Damion Thomas	Jamaica	0.135	13.39	
4	9	Paolo Dal Molin	Italy	0.133	13.40	
5	4	Jason Joseph	Switzerland	0.135	13.46	
6	2	Chen Kuei-ru	Chinese Taipei	0.146	13.57	
7	3	Elmo Lakka	Finland	0.139	13.67	
8	7	Taio Kanai	Japan	0.127	26.11	

==== Semifinal 3 ====
Rank	Lane	Athlete	Nation	Reaction	Time	Notes
1	4	Grant Holloway	United States	0.130	13.13	Q
2	6	Hansle Parchment	Jamaica	0.145	13.23	Q
3	7	Shunsuke Izumiya	Japan	0.141	13.35	
4	9	Valdó Szűcs	Hungary	0.140	13.40	
5	8	Xie Wenjun	China	0.154	13.58	
6	5	Rafael Henrique Pereira	Brazil	0.154	13.62	
7	2	David King	Great Britain	0.141	13.67	
8	3	Milan Trajkovic	Cyprus	0.147	14.01	

=== Final ===
Rank	Lane	Athlete	Nation	Reaction	Time	Notes
1st place, gold medalist(s)	7	Hansle Parchment	Jamaica	0.130	13.04	SB
2nd place, silver medalist(s)	4	Grant Holloway	United States	0.136	13.09	
3rd place, bronze medalist(s)	5	Ronald Levy	Jamaica	0.146	13.10	
4	6	Devon Allen	United States	0.133	13.14	
5	8	Pascal Martinot-Lagarde	France	0.120	13.16	SB
6	2	Asier Martínez	Spain	0.155	13.22	PB
7	3	Andrew Pozzi	Great Britain	0.140	13.30	
8	9	Aurel Manga	France	0.151	13.38	
				Wind: -0.5 m/s		
