= Anousone Xaysa =

Laotian hurdler

Personal information
- Born: 20 February 1994 (age 32) Vientiane, Laos
- Height: 1.80 m (5 ft 11 in)
- Weight: 65 kg (143 lb)

Sport
- Sport: Track and field
- Event: 110 metres hurdles
Medal record
Men's Athletics
Representing Laos
Southeast Asian Games
Bronze medal – third place	2013 Naypyidaw	Men's 110 m hurdles
Bronze medal – third place	2019 Manila	Men's 110 m hurdles

Anousone Xaysa (born 20 March 1994) is a Laotian hurdler. He competed at the 2015 World Championships in Beijing without qualifying for the semifinals. His personal best in the 110 metres hurdles is 14.15 seconds (+1.2 m/s) set in Palembang in 2014. This is the current national record.

He competed for Laos at the 2016 Summer Olympics in Rio de Janeiro in the men's 110 metres hurdles event, where he finished last in his heat. Because this heat and one other took place in heavy rain unlike later heats, there was a re-run for athletes who failed to qualify by right. Xaysa Anousone did not start in that repechage. He was the flag bearer for Laos during the Parade of Nations.

== Competition record ==
Year	Competition	Venue	Position	Event	Notes
Representing Laos
2011	World Youth Championships	Lille, France	32nd (h)	110 m hurdles (91.4 cm)	15.20
2012	World Junior Championships	Barcelona, Spain	54th (h)	110 m hurdles (99 cm)	14.94
2013	World Championships	Moscow, Russia	33rd (h)	110 m hurdles	16.21
2013	SEA Games	Naypyidaw, Myanmar	3rd	110 m hurdles	14.17
2014	Asian Games	Incheon, South Korea	12th (h)	110 m hurdles	14.21
2015	Asian Championships	Wuhan, China	19th (h)	110 m hurdles	14.60
2015	SEA Games	Singapore	6th	110 m hurdles	14.33
2015	World Championships	Beijing, China	37th (h)	110 m hurdles	14.74
2016	Olympic Games	Rio de Janeiro, Brazil	34th (h)	110 m hurdles	14.40
2017	Jeux de la Francophonie	Abidjan, Ivory Coast	7th	110 m hurdles	14.75
2017	World Championships	London, United Kingdom	39th (h)	110 m hurdles	14.55
2018	Asian Games	Jakarta, Indonesia	13th (h)	110 m hurdles	14.27
2019	Asian Championships	Doha, Qatar	14th (h)	110 m hurdles	14.45
2019	World Championships	Doha, Qatar	35th (h)	110 m hurdles	14.54
2019	SEA Games	Philippines	3rd	110 m hurdles	13.99
