= Rio Maholtra =

Indonesian hurdler

Personal information
- Born: 28 December 1993 (age 31) Lahat, South Sumatra, Indonesia

Sport
- Sport: Athletics
- Event(s): 110 m hurdles, 60 m hurdles

Rio Maholtra (born 28 December 1993) is an Indonesian athlete specialising in the sprint hurdles. He represented his country at the 2018 World Indoor Championships without advancing from the first round.

His personal bests are 14.02 seconds in the 110 metres hurdles (-0.5 m/s, Jakarta 2018) and 7.98 seconds in the 60 metres hurdles (Birmingham 2018). Both are current national records.

== International competitions ==
Year	Competition	Venue	Position	Event	Notes
Representing Indonesia
2011	Southeast Asian Games	Palembang, Indonesia	8th	110 m hurdles	15.00
2012	Asian Junior Championships	Colombo, Sri Lanka	13th (h)	110 m hurdles (99.0 cm)	14.55
2012	World Junior Championships	Barcelona, Spain	32nd (h)	110 m hurdles (99.0 cm)	14.16
2014	Asian Indoor Championships	Hangzhou, China	7th	60 m hurdles	8.27
2015	Southeast Asian Games	Singapore	4th (h)	110 m hurdles	14.10^{1}
2015	Military World Games	Mungyeong, South Korea	13th (h)	110 m hurdles	14.51
2015	Military World Games	Mungyeong, South Korea	9th (h)	4 × 100 m relay	41.15
2017	Asian Championships	Bhubaneswar, India	13th (h)	110 m hurdles	14.08
2018	World Indoor Championships	Birmingham, United Kingdom	33rd (h)	60 m hurdles	7.98
2018	Asian Games	Jakarta, Indonesia	11th (h)	110 m hurdles	14.02

^{1}Did not finish in the final
