= Chen Kuei-ru =

Taiwanese hurdler (born 1993)

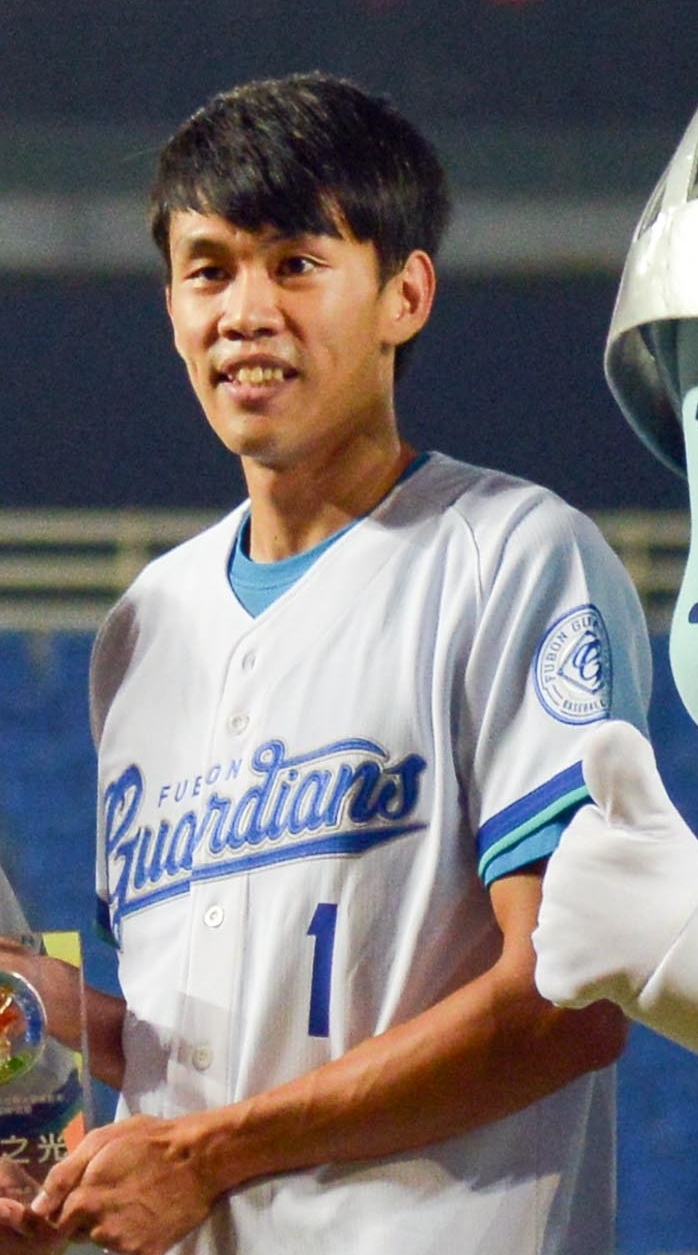

Personal information
- Born: 22 September 1993 (age 32) Sihu, Yunlin, Taiwan
- Education: National Taiwan Sport University
- Height: 1.89 m (6 ft 2 in)
- Weight: 70 kg (154 lb)

Sport
- Sport: Athletics
- Events: 110 m hurdles, 60 m hurdles
Medal record
Men's athletics
Representing Chinese Taipei
Asian Indoor Championships
Silver medal – second place	2023 Astana	60 m hurdles

Chen Kuei-ru (Chinese: 陳奎儒; also transliterated as Chen Kuei-ju; born 22 September 1993) is a Taiwanese athlete competing in the sprint hurdles. He won a silver medal at the 2017 Summer Universiade.

His personal bests are 13.34 seconds in the 110 metres hurdles (+0.1 m/s, Taipei 2019) and 7.81 seconds in the 60 metres hurdles (Doha 2016). Both are current national records.

== Competition record ==
Year	Competition	Venue	Position	Event	Notes
Representing Chinese Taipei
2014	Asian Games	Incheon, South Korea	10th (h)	110 m hurdles	13.91
2016	Asian Indoor Championships	Doha, Qatar	4th	60 m hurdles	7.81
2017	Asian Championships	Bhubaneswar, India	6th	110 m hurdles	13.82
2017	Universiade	Taipei, Taiwan	2nd	110 m hurdles	13.55
2018	Asian Games	Jakarta, Indonesia	2nd	110 m hurdles	13.39
2019	Asian Championships	Doha, Qatar	3rd	110 m hurdles	13.39
2019	World Championships	Doha, Qatar	11th (sf)	110 m hurdles	13.52
2021	Olympic Games	Tokyo, Japan	15th (sf)	110 m hurdles	13.57
2022	World Indoor Championships	Belgrade, Serbia	19th (sf)	60 m hurdles	7.67
2022	World Championships	Eugene, United States	34th (h)	110 m hurdles	13.82
2023	Asian Indoor Championships	Astana, Kazakhstan	2nd	60 m hurdles	7.68
2023	Asian Championships	Bangkok, Thailand	10th (h)	110 m hurdles	13.89
2023	World Championships	Budapest, Hungary	34th (h)	110 m hurdles	13.72
2023	Asian Games	Hangzhou, China	–	110 m hurdles	DNF
