= Milan Ristić (athlete) =

Serbian track and field athlete

Personal information
- Nationality: Serbian
- Born: 8 August 1991 (age 35) Belgrade, Yugoslavia
- Height: 1.88 m (6 ft 2 in)
- Weight: 88 kg (194 lb)

Sport
- Sport: Track
- Events: 110 meters hurdles, 100 meters, 200 meters
- College team: Cal
- Club: AK Crvena Zvezda

Achievements and titles
- Personal bests: 100 meters: 10.59; 200 meters: 21.35; 110-m hurdles: 13.37; Indoor 60-m hurdles: 7.67

Milan Ristić (Serbian Cyrillic: Милан Ристић, born 8 August 1991) is a Serbian track and field athlete who specializes in hurdling. Having competed in hurdling and other events with archrivals AK Crvena Zvezda and AK Partizan, he has represented Serbia in international competition. Ristić has competed in track at both high school and collegiate levels in the United States. He is a Serbian national record holder in the indoor 60 meter hurdles and the outdoor 110 meter hurdles events. Ristić is a member of Serbian national senior team since 2010.

== Track career ==
=== Youth ===
Ristić attended an electrotechnical school in Belgrade called "Nikola Tesla". He began training athletics with AK 21. Maj, then he transferred to AK Crvena Zvezda, where he was a national champion of Serbia in the 100 meters, 200 meters and with the relay 4×100 meters for U20 years of age disciplines. He would eventually change teams to his currently third team to AK Partizan in the transfer period of 2013/2014.

=== Collegiate and international ===
Ristić was recruited by University of North Carolina at Asheville, where he broke the school's records in the 200 meters indoor, 60 meter hurdles, and 55 meter hurdles, 60 meters indoors, 55 meters indoors, Long Jump outdoors, 110 meters hurdles, 100 meters and 200 meters. He is undefeated in 110 meters hurdles in Serbia since 2010. He is a senior National champion in the 110 meters hurdles 3 times currently. Eventually he was transferred to University of California, Berkeley, where he competed indoor and currently still runs outdoor. He ran personal best after the transfer dropping his hurdles times for indoors from 7.75s from UNC Asheville to 7.67s wearing UC Berkeley's jersey, he also dropped his outdoor time from 13.88s to 13.59s. He represent Serbia at the 2013 Mediterranean Games in the 110 meter hurdles. In 2014, Ristić placed sixth overall at the 2014 NCAA DI Indoor T&F Championships in the indoor 60 meter hurdles, breaking a Serbian national record in the process two times in two days. He broke the National record 3 times in 2 weeks over the indoor season (2013/2014)

== International competitions ==
Year	Competition	Venue	Position	Event	Notes
Representing Serbia
2011	European U23 Championships	Ostrava, Czech Republic	19th	110 m hurdles	14.33
2013	European Team Championships — 2nd League	Kaunas, Lithuania	3rd	110 m hurdles	13.93
2013	Mediterranean Games	Mersin, Turkey	6th	110 m hurdles	14.13
2013	European U23 Championships	Tampere, Finland	11th	110 m hurdles	14.12
2014	European Team Championships — 2nd League	Riga, Latvia	1st	110 m hurdles	13.80
2015	Universiade	Gwangju, South Korea	5th	110 m hurdles	13.78
2015	World Championships	Beijing, China	32nd (h)	110m hurdles	13.89
2016	European Championships	Amsterdam, Netherlands	8th (sf)	110 m hurdles	13.45
2016	Olympic Games	Rio de Janeiro, Brazil	24th (h)	110 m hurdles	13.66
2017	World Championships	London, United Kingdom	—	110 m hurdles	DQ
