= Yaqoub Al-Youha =

Kuwaiti hurdler (born 1993)

Yaqoub Mohamed Al-Youha يعقوب محمد اليوحة
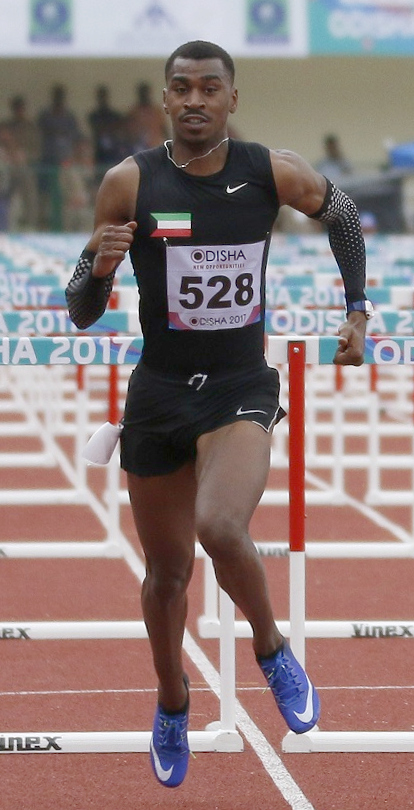
- Al-Youha at the 2017 Asian Championships

Personal information
- Born: 31 January 1993 (age 33)

Sport
- Sport: Athletics
- Events: 110 m hurdles, 100 m, 200 m

Achievements and titles
- Personal bests: 100 m – 10.48 (2014); 200 m – 22.00 (2015); 110 mH – 13.35 (2019)
Medal record
Men's athletics
Representing Kuwait
Asian Indoor Championships
Silver medal – second place	2014 Hangzhou	60 m hurdles
Silver medal – second place	2016 Doha	60 m hurdles

Yaqoub Mohamed Al-Youha (Arabic: يعقوب محمد اليوحة; born 31 January 1993) is a Kuwaiti sprint runner specialising in the high hurdles. He represented his country at the 2017 World Championships reaching the semifinals. He won silver medals at the Asian championships in 2014–2017.

His personal best in the 110 metres hurdles is 13.35 set in Doha in 2019. It is the current national record.

== International competitions ==
Year	Competition	Venue	Position	Event	Notes
Representing Kuwait
2011	Asian Championships	Kobe, Japan	–	110 m hurdles	DNF
2012	Asian Junior Championships	Colombo, Sri Lanka	7th	110 m hurdles (99 cm)	14.05
2012	World Junior Championships	Barcelona, Spain	19th (sf)	110 m hurdles (99 cm)	13.91
2012	West Asian Championships	Dubai, United Arab Emirates	3rd	110 m hurdles	14.69
2013	Arab Championships	Doha, Qatar	4th	110 m hurdles	14.07
2013	Islamic Solidarity Games	Palembang, Indonesia	4th	110 m hurdles	14.00
2014	Asian Indoor Championships	Hangzhou, China	2nd	60 m hurdles	7.90
2014	Asian Games	Incheon, South Korea	7th	110 m hurdles	13.83
2015	Arab Championships	Isa Town, Bahrain	2nd	110 m hurdles	13.37 (w)
2015	Arab Championships	Isa Town, Bahrain	1st	4 × 100 m relay	39.75
2015	Asian Championships	Wuhan, China	2nd (h)	110 m hurdles	13.66^{1}
2016	Asian Indoor Championships	Doha, Qatar	2nd	60 m hurdles	7.65
2017	Asian Championships	Bhubaneswar, India	2nd	110 m hurdles	13.59
2017	Arab Championships	Radès, Tunisia	1st	110 m hurdles	13.48 (w)
2017	Arab Championships	Radès, Tunisia	3rd	4 × 100 m relay	40.83
2017	World Championships	London, United Kingdom	21st (h)	110 m hurdles	13.56^{2}
2018	West Asian Championships	Amman, Jordan	1st	110 m hurdles	14.13
2019	Arab Championships	Cairo, Egypt	1st	110 m hurdles	13.74
2019	Asian Championships	Doha, Qatar	2nd	110 m hurdles	13.35
2019	World Championships	Doha, Qatar	15th (sf)	110 m hurdles	13.57
2021	Arab Championships	Radès, Tunisia	1st	110 m hurdles	13.71
2021	Olympic Games	Tokyo, Japan	31st (h)	110 m hurdles	13.69
2022	World Indoor Championships	Belgrade, Serbia	12th (sf)	60 m hurdles	7.59
2022	GCC Games	Kuwait City, Kuwait	1st	110 m hurdles	13.65 (w)
2022	Islamic Solidarity Games	Konya, Turkey	3rd	110 m hurdles	13.30 (w)
2023	Asian Indoor Championships	Astana, Kazakhstan	4th	60 m hurdles	7.70
2023	West Asian Championships	Doha, Qatar	1st	110 m hurdles	13.67
2023	Arab Championships	Marrakesh, Morocco	1st	110 m hurdles	13.58
2023	Arab Games	Oran, Algeria	2nd	110 m hurdles	13.67
2023	Asian Championships	Bangkok, Thailand	3rd	110 m hurdles	13.56
2023	World Championships	Budapest, Hungary	16th (sf)	110 m hurdles	13.44
2023	Asian Games	Hangzhou, China	1st	110 m hurdles	13.41
2024	Olympic Games	Paris, France	–	110 m hurdles	DNF
2025	World Indoor Championships	Nanjing, China	31st (h)	60 m hurdles	8.50
2025	Asian Championships	Gumi, South Korea	12th (h)	110 m hurdles	13.89
2025	Islamic Solidarity Games	Riyadh, Saudi Arabia	1st	110 m hurdles	13.62
2026	Asian Indoor Championships	Tianjin, China	3rd (h)	60 m hurdles	7.74^{1}
2026	GCC Games	Doha, Qatar	1st	110 m hurdles	13.67 (w)

^{1}Disqualified in the final
^{2}Did not finish in the semifinals
