= Athletics at the 2017 Summer Universiade – Men's 110 metres hurdles =

The men's 110 metres hurdles event at the 2017 Summer Universiade was held on 26 and 27 August at the Taipei Municipal Stadium in Taipei, Taiwan.

== Medalists ==
Gold	Silver	Bronze
Balázs Baji; Hungary	Chen Kuei-ru; Chinese Taipei	Damian Czykier; Poland

== Results ==
=== Heats ===
Qualification: First 3 in each heat (Q) and next 4 fastest (q) qualified for the semifinals.

Wind:
Heat 1: 0.0 m/s, Heat 2: -2.4 m/s, Heat 3: -4.0 m/s, Heat 4: -2.8 m/s

Rank	Heat	Name	Nationality	Time	Notes
1	4	Chen Kuei-ru	Chinese Taipei	13.74	Q
2	2	Balázs Baji	Hungary	13.84	Q
3	1	Gabriel Constantino	Brazil	13.88	Q
4	1	Yang Wei-ting	Chinese Taipei	13.89	Q
5	4	Simon Krauss	France	13.91	Q
6	4	Nicholas Hough	Australia	13.93	Q
7	1	Amere Lattin	United States	13.95	Q
8	2	Shusei Nomoto	Japan	14.03	Q
9	3	Taio Kanai	Japan	14.07	Q
10	3	Sekou Kaba	Canada	14.07	Q
11	4	Rapolas Saulius	Lithuania	14.10	q
12	2	Tshepo Lefete	South Africa	14.15	Q
13	3	Damian Czykier	Poland	14.30	Q
14	1	Vyacheslav Zems	Kazakhstan	14.32	q
15	2	Václav Sedlák	Czech Republic	14.35	q
15	4	Kim Gyeong-tae	South Korea	14.35	q
17	4	Ingvar Moseley	Canada	14.36	
18	2	Jonatha Mendes	Brazil	14.40	
19	1	Cosmin Dumitrache	Romania	14.49	
19	3	Joshua Hawkins	New Zealand	14.49	
21	3	Ahmad Hazer	Lebanon	14.97	
22	2	Akhila Imantha Nilaweera	Sri Lanka	15.14	
23	2	Alvin Vergel	Philippines	15.17	
24	3	Florian Some	Burkina Faso	15.60	
	1	Lebone Mkatini	South Africa	DNS	

=== Semifinals ===
Qualification: First 3 in each heat (Q) and the next 2 fastest (q) qualified for the final.

Wind:
Heat 1: +0.9 m/s, Heat 2: -2.0 m/s

Rank	Heat	Name	Nationality	Time	Notes
1	1	Damian Czykier	Poland	13.57	Q
2	1	Chen Kuei-ru	Chinese Taipei	13.63	Q
3	1	Taio Kanai	Japan	13.66	Q
4	2	Balázs Baji	Hungary	13.67	Q
5	1	Nicholas Hough	Australia	13.70	q
6	2	Shusei Nomoto	Japan	13.79	Q
7	1	Sekou Kaba	Canada	13.82	q, SB
8	2	Gabriel Constantino	Brazil	13.94	Q
9	2	Tshepo Lefete	South Africa	13.95	
10	1	Rapolas Saulius	Lithuania	14.06	
10	2	Yang Wei-ting	Chinese Taipei	14.06	
12	1	Kim Gyeong-tae	South Korea	14.11	PB
13	2	Václav Sedlák	Czech Republic	14.25	
14	2	Vyacheslav Zems	Kazakhstan	14.45	
	1	Simon Krauss	France	DQ	R168.7b
	2	Amere Lattin	United States	DQ	R168.7a

=== Final ===
Wind: -0.5 m/s

Official Video

Rank	Lane	Name	Nationality	Time	Notes
1st place, gold medalist(s)	6	Balázs Baji	Hungary	13.35	
2nd place, silver medalist(s)	5	Chen Kuei-ru	Chinese Taipei	13.55	PB
3rd place, bronze medalist(s)	4	Damian Czykier	Poland	13.56	
4	8	Taio Kanai	Japan	13.69	
5	7	Shusei Nomoto	Japan	13.71	
6	2	Nicholas Hough	Australia	13.73	
7	3	Sekou Kaba	Canada	13.87	
	9	Gabriel Constantino	Brazil	DQ	R168.7
