= Rachid Muratake =

Japanese hurdler

Personal information
- Born: 6 February 2002 (age 24) Matsudo, Japan
- Education: Juntendo University
- Height: 1.79 m (5 ft 10 in)

Sport
- Country: Japan
- Sport: Athletics
- Event: 110 m hurdles

Achievements and titles
- Personal bests: 60 mH: 7.60 (Osaka 2022); 110 mH: 12.92 (Fukui 2025) NR
Medal record
Men's athletics
Representing Japan
Asian Championships
Gold medal – first place	2025 Gumi	110 m hurdles
Asian Games
Silver medal – second place	2026 Aichi–Nagoya	110 m hurdles

Rachid Muratake (村竹ラシッド, Muratake Rashiddo; born 6 February 2002) is a Japanese track and field athlete specializing in the high hurdles. Born in Matsudo to a Togolese father and a Japanese mother, he studies at Juntendo University.

His personal best in the 110 metres hurdles is 13.04 (-0.9 m/s) set in Kumagaya in 2023, which equaled the Japanese record and met the 2024 Olympic standard of 13.27. In March 2023, he also set the meet record for the event at the Sydney Track Classic in 13.25 (+0.3 m/s). He placed 5th at the 2024 Summer Olympics in Paris, where he ran a time of 13.21. When he made his entrance, he performed an iconic pose from JoJo's Bizarre Adventure, which became a hot topic in Japan. At the 2025 World Athletics Championships in Tokyo, he again placed 5th, with a time of 13.18.

== International competitions ==
Year	Competition	Venue	Position	Event	Notes
Representing Japan
2022	World Championships	Eugene, United States	30th (h)	110 m hurdles	13.73
2024	Olympic Games	Paris, France	5th	110 m hurdles	13.21
2025	Asian Championships	Gumi, South Korea	1st	110 m hurdles	13.22
2025	World Championships	Tokyo, Japan	5th	110 m hurdles	13.18
2026	World Ultimate Championship	Budapest, Hungary	5th	110 m hurdles	13.71
