= Kim Byoung-jun =

South Korean hurdler (born 1991)

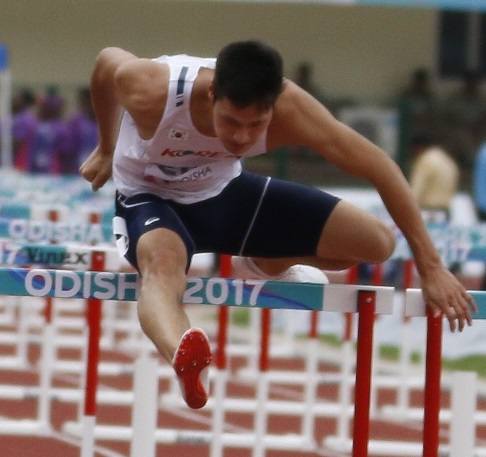
- Kim Byoung-jun in 2017

Personal information
- Born: 15 August 1991 (age 34) North Gyeongsang Province, South Korea
- Height: 1.90 m (6 ft 3 in)
- Weight: 80 cm

Sport
- Sport: Athletics
- Event: 110 metres hurdles

Korean name
- Hangul: 김병준
- RR: Gim Byeongjun
- MR: Kim Pyŏngjun

Kim Byoung-jun (Korean: 김병준; born 15 August 1991) is a South Korean athlete specialising in the high hurdles. He represented his country at the 2017 World Championships without advancing from the first round. Additionally, he won a silver medal at the 2014 Asian Games and a bronze at the 2015 Asian Championships.

His personal bests are 13.39 seconds in the 110 metres hurdles (+0.3 m/s, Bangkok 2017) and 7.86 seconds in the 60 metres hurdles (Flagstaff 2014). The first one is the current national record.

== International competitions ==
Year	Competition	Venue	Position	Event	Notes
Representing South Korea
2013	Asian Championships	Pune, India	–	110 m hurdles	DNF
2013	East Asian Games	Tianjin, China	2nd	110 m hurdles	13.61
2014	Asian Games	Incheon, South Korea	2nd	110 m hurdles	13.43
2015	Asian Championships	Wuhan, China	3rd	110 m hurdles	13.75
2015	Universiade	Gwangju, South Korea	5th (h)	110 m hurdles	13.79^{1}
2017	Asian Championships	Bhubaneswar, India	12th (h)	110 m hurdles	14.07
2017	World Championships	London, United Kingdom	36th (h)	110 m hurdles	13.81
2018	Asian Games	Jakarta, Indonesia	5th	110 m hurdles	13.57

^{1}Did not start in the final
