= Track and field at the 2015 Military World Games – Men's 110 metres hurdles =

The men's 110 metres hurdles event at the 2015 Military World Games was held on 5 and 7 October at the KAFAC Sports Complex.

== Records ==
Prior to this competition, the existing world and CISM record were as follows:

World Record	Aries Merritt (USA)	12.80	Brussels, Belgium	7 September 2012
CISM World Record	Staņislavs Olijars (LAT)	13.32	Zagreb, Croatia	August 1999

== Schedule ==
Date	Time	Round
5 October 2015	10:00	Round 1
7 October 2015	16:40	Final

== Medalists ==
Gold	Silver	Bronze
Sergey Shubenkov; Russia	Artur Noga; Poland	Dominik Bochenek; Poland

== Results ==
=== Round 1 ===
Qualification: First 2 in each heat (Q) and next 2 fastest (q) qualified for the final.

Wind:
Heat 1: -0.1 m/s, Heat 2: -1.2 m/s, Heat 3: -0.5 m/s

Rank	Heat	Name	Nationality	Time	Notes
1	1	Sergey Shubenkov	Russia	13.71	Q
2	2	Artur Noga	Poland	13.92	Q
3	3	Ji Wei	China	13.97	Q
4	3	Dominik Bochenek	Poland	14.03	Q
5	1	Ahmed Almuwallad	Saudi Arabia	14.14	Q
6	3	Jonathan Mendes	Brazil	14.16	q
7	2	Chu Pengfei	China	14.21	Q
8	1	Dario De Borger	Belgium	14.24	q
9	2	Maksim Lynsha	Belarus	14.25	
10	3	Kyler Wayne Martin	United States	14.33	
11	3	Damien Broothaerts	Belgium	14.34	
12	1	Jong Jin Won	South Korea	14.43	
13	2	Rio Maholtra	Indonesia	14.51	
14	2	Muhammad Sajjad	Pakistan	14.69	
15	1	William Mbevi Mutunga	Kenya	15.22	
16	1	Jassim Al Balooshi	United Arab Emirates	15.50	
	2	Boniface Mucheru Tumuti	Kenya	DNF	
	1	Emmanuel Chimdzeka	Malawi	DNS	
	3	Pethias Barclays Gondwe Mdoka	Malawi	DNS	

=== Final ===
Wind: -0.9 m/s

Rank	Lane	Name	Nationality	Time	Notes
1st place, gold medalist(s)	3	Sergey Shubenkov	Russia	13.43	
2nd place, silver medalist(s)	4	Artur Noga	Poland	13.79	
3rd place, bronze medalist(s)	6	Dominik Bochenek	Poland	13.84	
4	5	Ji Wei	China	13.91	
5	2	Jonathan Mendes	Brazil	13.98	
6	7	Chu Pengfei	China	14.05	
	1	Dario De Borger	Belgium	DNF	
	8	Ahmed Almuwallad	Saudi Arabia	DQ	R162.7
