= Qin Weibo =

Chinese athlete (born 2002)

Weibo Qin
Personal information
- Native name: 秦伟搏
- Nationality: Chinese
- Born: 29 December 2002 (age 23)

Sport
- Sport: Athletics
- Event: Hurdles

Achievements and titles
- Personal bests: 60m hurdles: 7.63s (2024); 110m hurdles: 13.29s (2024)
Medal record
Men's athletics
Representing China
Asian Championships
Bronze medal – third place	2025 Gumi	110m hurdles
Asian Indoor Championships
Silver medal – second place	2024 Tehran	60m hurdles

Weibo Qin (born 29 December 2002) is a Chinese sprint hurdler. In 2024, he became Chinese national champion in the 60 metres hurdles and 110 metres hurdles.

== Career ==
He won the 60 metres hurdles title at the Chinese Athletics Indoors Championships in February 2024. That month, he was a silver medalist over 60 metres hurdles at the 2024 Asian Indoor Athletics Championships in Tehran, Iran, running a personal best 7.63 seconds.

He won the Chinese Athletics Championships over 110 metres hurdles in June 2024. He competed in the 110m hurdles at the 2024 Paris Olympics, where he reached the semi-finals.

He reached the final of the 60 metres hurdles at the 2025 World Athletics Indoor Championships in Nanjing. In May 2025, he won the bronze medal in the 110 metres hurdles at the 2025 Asian Athletics Championships.

== Personal life ==
He attends East China Normal University in Shanghai.
