= Yang Wei-ting =

Taiwanese hurdler

Personal information
- Born: 22 September 1993 (age 32)
- Education: National Taiwan Normal University

Sport
- Sport: Athletics
- Event(s): 110 m hurdles, 60 m hurdles

Yang Wei-ting (born 22 September 1994) is a Taiwanese athlete competing in the sprint hurdles. He represented his country at three outdoor and two indoor Asian Championships.

His personal bests are 13.57 seconds in the 110 metres hurdles (+0.5 m/s, Taipei 2017) and 7.87 seconds in the 60 metres hurdles (Doha 2016).

== Competition record ==
Year	Competition	Venue	Position	Event	Notes
Representing Chinese Taipei
2013	Asian Championships	Pune, India	16th (h)	110 m hurdles	14.89
2014	Asian Indoor Championships	Hangzhou, China	10th (h)	60 m hurdles	8.30
2015	Asian Championships	Wuhan, China	6th	110 m hurdles	13.87
2016	Asian Indoor Championships	Doha, Qatar	5th	60 m hurdles	7.87
2017	Asian Championships	Bhubaneswar, India	7th	110 m hurdles	13.83
2017	Universiade	Taipei, Taiwan	10th (h)	110 m hurdles	14.06
2018	Asian Games	Jakarta, Indonesia	8th	110 m hurdles	13.75
2019	Asian Championships	Doha, Qatar	7th (h)	110 m hurdles	13.75
2019	Universiade	Naples, Italy	6th	110 m hurdles	13.69
