= Athletics at the 2014 Asian Games – Men's 110 metres hurdles =

Asian Games 2014

Men's 110 metres hurdles at the 2014 Asian Games
- Venue: Incheon Asiad Main Stadium
- Dates: 28–30 September 2014
- Competitors: 13 from 10 nations

Medalists
gold medal	Xie Wenjun	China
silver medal	Kim Byoung-jun	South Korea
bronze medal	Jamras Rittidet	Thailand

The men's 110 metres hurdles event at the 2014 Asian Games was held at the Incheon Asiad Main Stadium, Incheon, South Korea on 28–30 September.

== Schedule ==
All times are Korea Standard Time (UTC+09:00)

Date	Time	Event
Sunday, 28 September 2014	19:55	Round 1
Tuesday, 30 September 2014	21:30	Final

== Records ==
Prior to this competition, the existing world, Asian and Games records were as follows.

World Record	Aries Merritt (USA)	12.80	Brussels, Belgium	7 September 2012
Asian Record	Liu Xiang (CHN)	12.88	Lausanne, Switzerland	11 July 2006
Games Record	Liu Xiang (CHN)	13.09	Guangzhou, China	24 November 2010

== Results ==
Legend

- DNF — Did not finish

=== Round 1 ===
- Qualification: First 3 in each heat (Q) and the next 2 fastest (q) advance to the final.

==== Heat 1 ====
- Wind: +1.0 m/s

Rank	Athlete	Time	Notes
1	Jiang Fan (CHN)	13.56	Q
2	Genta Masuno (JPN)	13.74	Q
3	Abdulaziz Al-Mandeel (KUW)	13.76	Q
4	Park Tae-kyong (KOR)	13.77	
5	Ameer Shakir (IRQ)	13.91	
6	Iong Kim Fai (MAC)	14.23	

==== Heat 2 ====
- Wind: +0.7 m/s

Rank	Athlete	Time	Notes
1	Kim Byoung-jun (KOR)	13.53	Q
2	Xie Wenjun (CHN)	13.53	Q
3	Jamras Rittidet (THA)	13.64	Q
4	Yaqoub Al-Youha (KUW)	13.64	q
5	Siddhanth Thingalaya (IND)	13.74	q
6	Chen Kuei-ru (TPE)	13.91	
7	Anousone Xaysa (LAO)	14.21	

=== Final ===
- Wind: +0.4 m/s

Rank	Athlete	Time	Notes
1st place, gold medalist(s)	Xie Wenjun (CHN)	13.36	
2nd place, silver medalist(s)	Kim Byoung-jun (KOR)	13.43	
3rd place, bronze medalist(s)	Jamras Rittidet (THA)	13.61	
4	Genta Masuno (JPN)	13.66	
5	Jiang Fan (CHN)	13.68	
6	Siddhanth Thingalaya (IND)	13.73	
7	Yaqoub Al-Youha (KUW)	13.83	
—	Abdulaziz Al-Mandeel (KUW)	DNF	
