= Sekou Kaba =

Guinean-Canadian hurdler (born 1990)

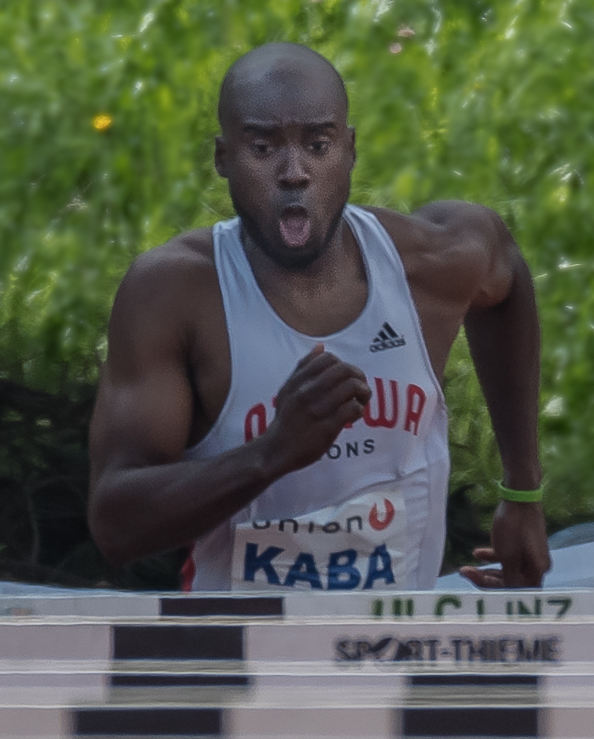
- Sekou Kaba in 2017

Personal information
- Full name: Sekou Mohamed Kaba
- Born: 25 August 1990 (age 36) Conakry, Guinea
- Education: University of Ottawa
- Height: 1.88 m (6 ft 2 in)
- Weight: 88 kg (194 lb)

Sport
- Country: Canada
- Sport: Track and field
- Event: 110 metres hurdles
- Club: Ottawa Lions Track and Field Club

Sekou Mohamed Kaba (born 25 August 1990) is a Guinean-Canadian hurdler. He competed in the 2016 Olympic Games in Rio de Janeiro and the 110 metres hurdles event at the 2015 World Championships in Beijing reaching the semifinals.

His family emigrated to Detroit, Michigan, USA, in 2001, while Kaba moved to Ottawa, Ontario, Canada, in 2007.

His personal bests are 13.43 seconds in the 110 metres hurdles (+1.9 m/s, Edmonton 2015) and 7.77 seconds in the 60 meters hurdles (New York 2015). In July 2016 he was named in Canada's Olympic team.

== Competition record ==
Year	Competition	Venue	Position	Event	Notes
Representing Canada
2012	NACAC U23 Championships	Irapuato, Mexico	5th	110 m hurdles	13.81
2013	Jeux de la Francophonie	Nice, France	1st	110 m hurdles	13.84
2015	Pan American Games	Toronto, Ontario, Canada	9th (h)	110 m hurdles	13.57
2015	World Championships	Beijing, China	22nd (sf)	110 m hurdles	13.58
2016	Olympic Games	Rio de Janeiro, Brazil	28th (h)	110 m hurdles	13.70
2017	Jeux de la Francophonie	Abidjan, Ivory Coast	2nd	110 m hurdles	13.81
2017	Universiade	Taipei, Taiwan	7th	110 m hurdles	13.87
