= David Yefremov =

Kazakhstani hurdler (born 1999)

Personal information
- Full name: David Aleksandrovich Yefremov
- Born: 15 January 1999 (age 27)
- Height: 1.96 m (6 ft 5 in)
- Weight: 84 kg (185 lb)

Sport
- Sport: Athletics
- Event: 110 metres hurdles
- Club: Altay Atletix
- Coached by: N. Barsanov
Medal record
Men's athletics
Representing Kazakhstan
Asian Indoor Championships
Gold medal – first place	2023 Astana	60 m hurdles
Gold medal – first place	2024 Tehran	60 m hurdles

David Aleksandrovich Yefremov (Russian: Дави́д Алекса́ндрович Ефре́мов; born 15 January 1999) is a Kazakhstani athlete specialing in the sprint hurdles. He won gold medals at the 2023 and 2024 Asian Indoor Championships.

Yefremov also competed at the 2024 Summer Olympics, the 2018 and 2022 Asian Games, and the 2021 Islamic Solidarity Games.

== International competitions ==
Year	Competition	Venue	Position	Event	Notes
Representing Kazakhstan
2018	Asian Junior Championships	Gifu, Japan	3rd	110 m hurdles (99 cm)	13.81
2018	World Championships	Tampere, Finland	31st (h)	110 m hurdles (99 cm)	14.01
2018	Asian Games	Jakarta, Indonesia	17th (h)	110 m hurdles	14.63
2019	Asian Championships	Doha, Qatar	6th	110 m hurdles	13.83
2019	Universiade	Naples, Italy	6th (h)	110 m hurdles	13.71^{1}
2019	Universiade	Naples, Italy	8th	4 × 400 m relay	3:07.66
2022	World Indoor Championships	Belgrade, Serbia	–	60 m hurdles	DQ
2022	Islamic Solidarity Games	Konya, Turkey	4th	110 m hurdles	13.64
2022	Islamic Solidarity Games	Konya, Turkey	5th	4 × 400 m relay	3:10.63
2023	Asian Indoor Championships	Astana, Kazakhstan	1st	60 m hurdles	7.65
2023	Asian Championships	Bangkok, Thailand	6th	110 m hurdles	13.60
2023	World University Games	Chengdu, China	6th	110 m hurdles	13.63
2023	World Championships	Bangkok, Thailand	36th (h)	110 m hurdles	13.78
2023	Asian Games	Hangzhou, China	11th (h)	110 m hurdles	14.03
2024	Asian Indoor Championships	Tehran, Iran	1st	60 m hurdles	7.60
2024	Olympic Games	Paris, France	37th (h)	110 m hurdles	13.88
2025	Asian Championships	Gumi, South Korea	5th	110 m hurdles	13.69
2026	Asian Indoor Championships	Tianjin, China	4th	60 m hurdles	7.71

^{1}Did not finish in the semifinal

== Personal bests ==
Outdoor

- 100 metres – 10.57 (+1.2 m/s, Almaty 2021)
- 200 metres – 21.58 (-0.2 m/s, Almaty 2019)
- 110 metres hurdles – 13.51 (+1.3 m/s, Almaty 2023)

Indoor

- 60 metres – 6.86 (Astana 2023)
- 200 metres – 21.79 (Ust-Kamenogorsk 2021)
- 60 metres hurdles – 7.59 (Astana 2024) NR
