= Shunya Takayama =

Japanese hurdler (born 1994)

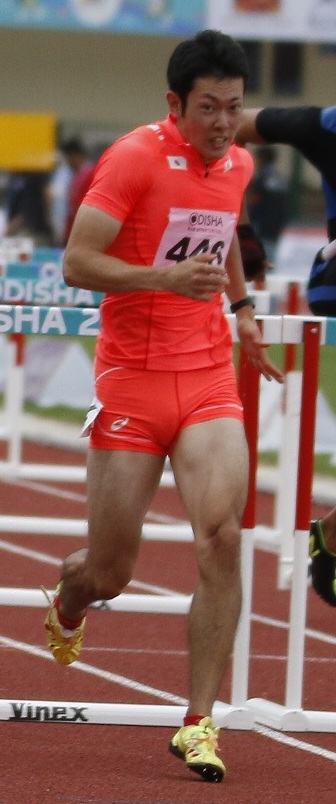
- Shunya Takayama in 2017

Personal information
- Born: 3 September 1994 (age 31) Hiroshima Prefecture, Japan
- Height: 1.82 m (6 ft 0 in)
- Weight: 73 kg (161 lb)

Sport
- Sport: Athletics
- Event: 110 metres hurdles
- Club: Zenrin

Shunya Takayama (高山 峻野, Takayama Shun'ya; born 3 September 1994) is a Japanese athlete specialising in the high hurdles. He represented his country at the 2017 World Championships without advancing from the first round. In addition, he won a bronze medal at the 2018 Asian Games.

His personal best in the 110 metres hurdles was 13.25 seconds (+1.1 m/s), former National record and the current second best record in Japan, set in Fukui in 2019., he improved it at 13.10 s (+0.6), in Hiratsuka on 6 August 2022.

== International competitions ==
Year	Competition	Venue	Position	Event	Notes
Representing Japan
2012	World Junior Championships	Barcelona, Spain	29th (h)	110 m hurdles (99 cm)	14.06
2017	Asian Championships	Bhubaneswar, India	4th	110 m hurdles	13.65
2017	World Championships	London, United Kingdom	32nd (h)	110 m hurdles	13.65
2018	Asian Games	Jakarta, Indonesia	3rd	110 m hurdles	13.48
2019	Asian Championships	Doha, Qatar	4th	110 m hurdles	13.59
2019	World Championships	Doha, Qatar	17th (sf)	110 m hurdles	13.58
2021	Olympic Games	Tokyo, Japan	35th (h)	110 m hurdles	13.98
2023	Asian Championships	Bangkok, Thailand	1st	110 m hurdles	13.29
2023	World Championships	Budapest, Hungary	13th (sf)	110 m hurdles	13.34
2023	Asian Games	Hangzhou, China	1st	110 m hurdles	13.41
2024	Olympic Games	Paris, France	4th (rep)	110 m hurdles	13.45
