= Abdulaziz Al-Mandeel =

Kuwaiti hurdler (born 1989)

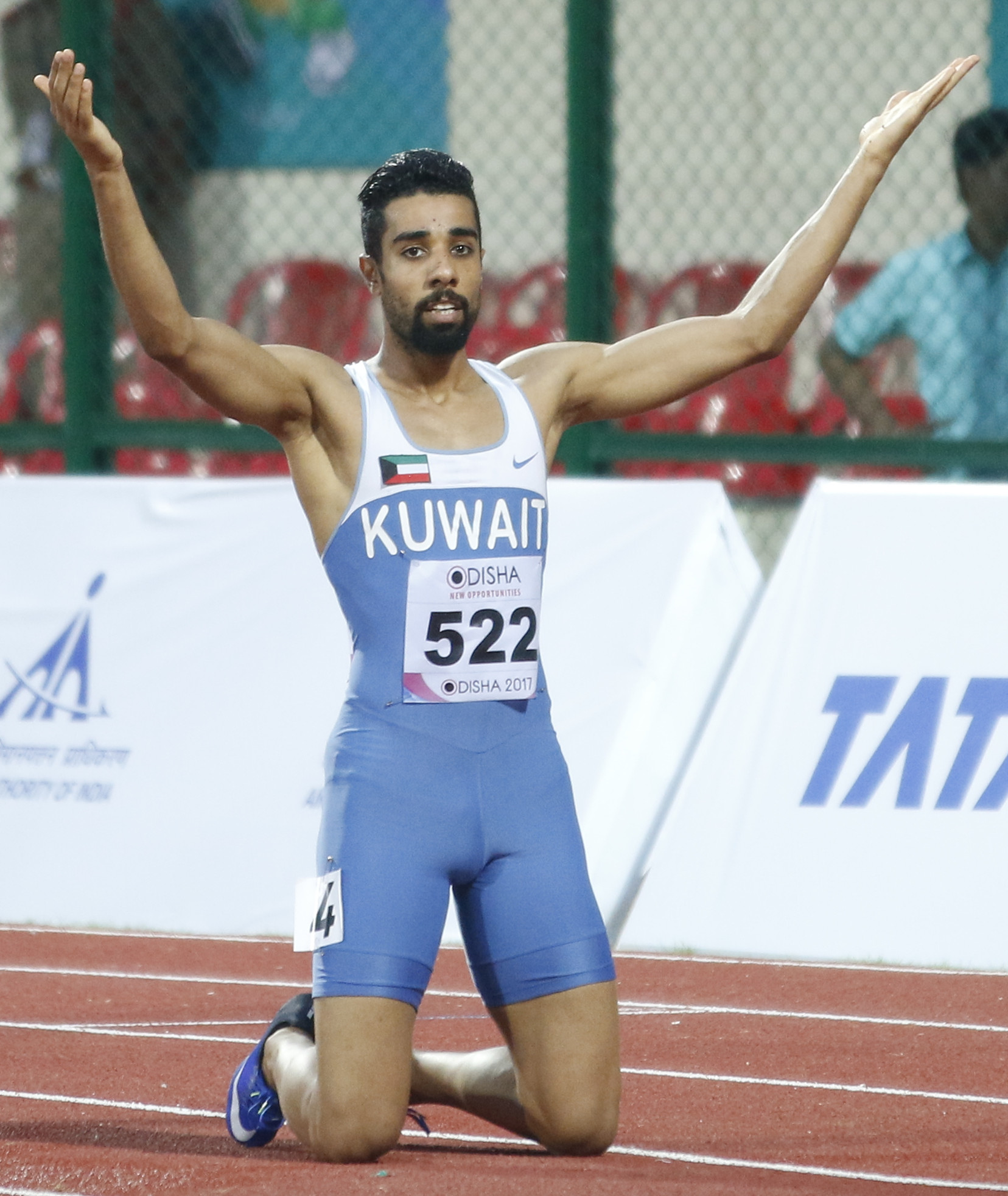
- Al-Mandeel at the 2017 Asian Championships

Personal information
- Born: 22 May 1989 (age 37)
- Height: 184 cm (6 ft 0 in)
- Weight: 75 kg (165 lb)

Sport
- Sport: Athletics
- Event: 110 m hurdles
- Club: Kazma Sports Club, Kuwait City

Achievements and titles
- Personal bests: 13.39 (2017, NR)
Medal record
Men's athletics
Representing Kuwait
Asian Indoor Championships
Gold medal – first place	2014 Hangzhou	60 m hurdles
Gold medal – first place	2016 Doha	60 m hurdles
Gold medal – first place	2018 Tehran	60 m hurdles
Silver medal – second place	2012 Hangzhou	60 m hurdles

Abdulaziz Al-Mandeel (born 22 May 1989) is a Kuwaiti athlete specializing in the high hurdles. He has won several medals at the regional level.

== Competition record ==
Year	Competition	Venue	Position	Event	Notes
Representing Kuwait
2005	World Youth Championships	Marrakesh, Morocco	27th (h)	110 m hurdles (91.4 cm)	14.40
2008	Arab Junior Championships	Radès, Tunisia	1st	110 m hurdles (99 cm)	13.78
2008	Asian Junior Championships	Jakarta, Indonesia	4th	110 m hurdles (99 cm)	13.89
2008	World Junior Championships	Bydgoszcz, Poland	14th (sf)	110 m hurdles (99 cm)	13.84 (wind: -0.9 m/s)
2009	Asian Indoor Games	Hanoi, Vietnam	13th (h)	60 m hurdles	8.31
2010	West Asian Championships	Aleppo, Syria	3rd	110 m hurdles	14.22
2010	West Asian Championships	Aleppo, Syria	2nd	4 × 100 m relay	40.08
2011	Arab Championships	Al Ain, United Arab Emirates	2nd	110 m hurdles	13.79
2011	Pan Arab Games	Doha, Qatar	3rd	110 m hurdles	13.78
2012	Asian Indoor Championships	Hangzhou, China	2nd	60 m hurdles	7.82
2012	World Indoor Championships	Istanbul, Turkey	23rd (h)	60 m hurdles	7.98
2012	West Asian Championships	Dubai, United Arab Emirates	1st	110 m hurdles	13.68
2012	West Asian Championships	Dubai, United Arab Emirates	3rd	4 × 100 m relay	40.61
2013	Arab Championships	Doha, Qatar	2nd	110 m hurdles	13.72
2013	Asian Championships	Pune, India	2nd	110 m hurdles	13.78
2013	Islamic Solidarity Games	Palembang, Indonesia	1st	110 m hurdles	13.89
2014	Asian Indoor Championships	Hangzhou, China	1st	60 m hurdles	7.80
2014	World Indoor Championships	Sopot, Poland	15th (h)	60 m hurdles	7.74
2014	Continental Cup	Marrakesh, Morocco	6th	110 m hurdles	13.49 (Note: Representing Asia-Pacific)
2014	Asian Games	Incheon, South Korea	8th (h)	110 m hurdles	13.76 (Note: Did not finish in the final)
2015	Arab Championships	Isa Town, Bahrain	1st	110 m hurdles	13.35 (w)
2015	Arab Championships	Isa Town, Bahrain	1st	4 × 100 m relay	39.75
2015	Asian Championships	Wuhan, China	2nd	110 m hurdles	13.67
2016	Asian Indoor Championships	Doha, Qatar	1st	60 m hurdles	7.60
2017	Asian Championships	Bhubaneswar, India	1st	110 m hurdles	13.50
2017	World Championships	London, United Kingdom	29th (h)	110 m hurdles	13.63
2018	Asian Indoor Championships	Tehran, Iran	1st	60 m hurdles	7.71
2018	World Indoor Championships	Birmingham, United Kingdom	15th (sf)	60 m hurdles	7.69
