= Zeng Jianhang =

Chinese hurdler (born 1998)

Personal information
- Native name: 曾建航
- Nationality: Chinese
- Born: 17 September 1998 (age 27)
- Home town: Fujian, China
- Height: 190 cm (6 ft 3 in)

Sport
- Sport: Athletics
- Event(s): 60 metres hurdles, 110 metres hurdles
- Coached by: Sun Haiping

Achievements and titles
- Personal bests: 60mH: 7.55 (2021); 110mH: 13.43 (-0.1) (2021)
Medal record
Men's athletics
Representing China
Asian Indoor Championships
Silver medal – second place	2018 Tehran	60 m hurdles
Military World Games
Silver medal – second place	2019 Wuhan	110 m hurdles

Zeng Jianhang (Note: In this Chinese name, the family name is Zeng.) (Chinese: 曾建航, also spelled Ceng Jianhang; born 17 September 1998) is a Chinese hurdler. He is a two-time national champion and he won a silver medal in the 60 metres hurdles at the 2018 Asian Indoor Athletics Championships.

== Biography ==
Zeng's first international championship was the 2016 World under-20 championships, where he was the first athlete to not qualify for the finals in his heat of the 110 m hurdles, finishing 5th.

Zeng's first national championship title came in the 2019 indoor season, when he won the 60 m hurdles in a time of 7.62 seconds. Outdoors, Zeng ran at the 2019 IAAF World Relays – Mixed shuttle hurdles relay, serving as the anchor leg with Wu Yanni on third leg. The team finished 3rd in their heat and did not qualify for the final. Zeng closed out his 2019 outdoor season with a win at the Chinese Athletics Championships and a silver medal at the Military World Games, both in the 110 m hurdles.

At the 2020 Chinese Athletics Championships, Zeng took an early lead, but Xie Wenjun pulled away in the final metres to win by 0.3 seconds.

In April 2021, Zeng fell and suffered a fracture during a warm-up for a competition. He was rushed to emergency surgery in Shanghai and did not compete at the 2021 Summer Olympics.

Zeng is from Fujian, China and he is coached by Sun Haiping, the same coach of Liu Xiang.

== Statistics ==
=== Personal bests ===
Event	Mark	Competition	Venue	Date
60 metres hurdles	7.55	National Indoor Grand Prix	Chengdu, China	13 March 2021
110 metres hurdles	13.43 (-0.1 m/s)	Yangtze River Delta Elite Meeting	Shaoxing, China	8 April 2021
