= Ang Chen Xiang =

Singaporean hurdler

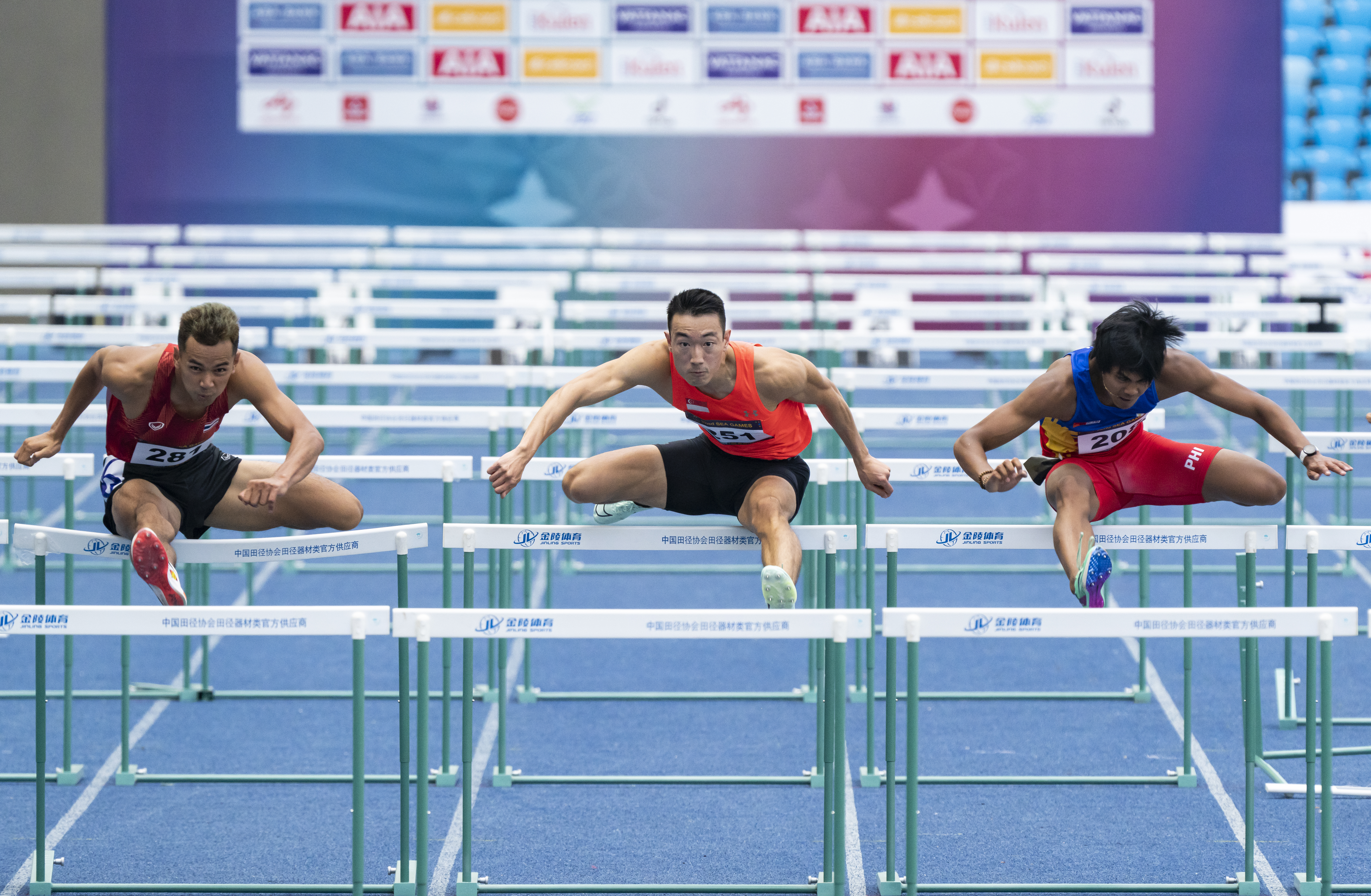
- Ang competing in the 2023 Southeast Asian Games

Personal information
- Born: 7 March 1994 (age 32) Singapore

Sport
- Sport: Athletics
- Event: 110m hurdles
Medal record
Men's Athletics
Representing Singapore
Southeast Asian Games
Gold medal – first place	2023 Cambodia	110m hurdles
Silver medal – second place	2021 Vietnam	110m hurdles
Silver medal – second place	2025 Thailand	110m hurdles

Ang Chen Xiang (born 7 March 1994) is an athlete from Singapore specialising in the 110m hurdles. He has held and rewritten the national record for the event several times.

== Education and personal life ==
Ang was educated at Raffles Institution. At the A Division National Championships, he won back-to-back titles in the 110m hurdles. He attended National University of Singapore to earn his medical degree.

== Athletic career ==
In 2015, Ang ran 14.44s to set the national record for the 110m hurdles, which he bettered the same year during the 2015 SEA Games (14.38s). In 2017, he clocked 14.19s at the Thailand Open—after putting his medical studies at NUS on hold—but the record was not ratified. In 2019, he broke the national mark thrice: twice during the Singapore Open (14.27s and 14.26s) and once during the Asian Athletics Championships in Doha (14.25s).

Ang at the 2025 SEA Games in Thailand

On 15 January 2022, Ang again rewrote the record for the 110m hurdles with a time of 14.16s. Eight days later, he became the first ever Singaporean to clock a sub-14 in the event, setting a new national mark of 13.97s at the Singapore National Championships and qualifying for the 2021 SEA Games in the process. There, he ran 13.94s to win a silver, Singapore's first medal at the event since 1989.

On 1 April 2023, Ang rewrote his record after winning the Hong Kong Athletics Series 3 competition with a timing of 13.90s. Later in the same month, he ran 13.89s at the Singapore Open. On 10 May 2023, he clocked 13.83s to win the joint gold at the 2023 SEA Games in Phnom Penh; this was Singapore's first gold in the event since 1967.

Ang took part in the 2022 Asian Games in Hangzhou. He clocked 13.90s in the heats of the 110m hurdles to qualify for the final. In 2025, he rewrote his 110m hurdles national record multiple times: first he clocked 13.81s in Hong Kong; then he clocked 13.80s in Singapore; and he ran 13.75s at the 2025 Southeast Asian Games in Thailand to win the silver. However, his time at the SEA Games was not recognised by the Singapore National Olympic Council due to problems reported with the timing system.

Ang also holds the national record for indoor 60m hurdles (8.16s); his personal best for the same event outdoors is 7.22s.

== Personal life ==
Ang's brother, Ang Ding Hui, also competed in the 110m hurdles and later became his coach.

Ang is a Christian.
