= Jiang Fan =

Chinese hurdler (born 1989)

Personal information
- Born: 16 September 1989 (age 36)
Medal record
Men's athletics
Representing China
Asian Indoor Championships
Gold medal – first place	2010 Tehran	60 m hurdles
Gold medal – first place	2012 Hangzhou	60 m hurdles
Summer Universiade
Silver medal – second place	2011 Shenzhen	110 m hurdles

Jiang Fan (Chinese: 江帆; born 16 September 1989) is a Chinese track and field athlete who competes in the 110 metres hurdles. He is a two-time champion in the 60 metres hurdles at the Asian Indoor Athletics Championships (2010 and 2012) and was the silver medallist outdoors at the 2011 Summer Universiade. He represented China at the 2011 World Championships in Athletics and set a 110 m hurdles best of 13.47 seconds at the competition.

Jiang began competing at national level in 2007 and made his international debut for China at the 2008 Asian Junior Athletics Championships, where he finished fifth in the 110 m hurdles. That year he ran a personal best of 13.83 seconds at the Good Luck Beijing pre-Olympic trial event. He also ran a best of 13.50 seconds over the smaller junior hurdles while taking second place at the Chinese junior championships. He began to establish himself among his country's top hurdlers the following season and ran a personal best of 13.69 seconds to win at Zhaoqing leg of the Chinese Grand Prix. At the end of the year he represented the Jiangsu province at the 11th Chinese Games and finished in fifth place.

In his first senior competition for China he equalled the meet record of 7.75 seconds to take the gold medal in the 60 metres hurdles at the 2010 Asian Indoor Athletics Championships. He did not match this form outdoors, however, and ended the season with a 110 m hurdles best time of 13.72 seconds and came sixth at the Chinese Athletics Championships. He ran on the Asian Athletics Grand Prix outdoor circuit in 2010 and improved his best by a margin of 0.2 seconds to win the Jiaxing leg. He gained selection for the 2011 Summer Universiade in Shenzhen and took the 110 m hurdles silver medal behind Hansle Parchment with a time of 13.55 seconds. He was chosen to participate at the 2011 World Championships in Athletics, which was held one week later, competing for China on the world stage for the first time. In his first heat he ran a personal best of 13.47 seconds to take second place behind David Oliver. He was slower in the semi-final, however, being eliminated after coming seventh. Two weeks later in Hefei he reached the podium at the National Championships for the first time, taking third place.

Jiang defended his 60 m hurdles title at the 2012 Asian Indoor Athletics Championships and knocked one hundredth off his personal best to set a new championship record mark.
