= Xie Wenjun =

Chinese hurdler (born 1990)

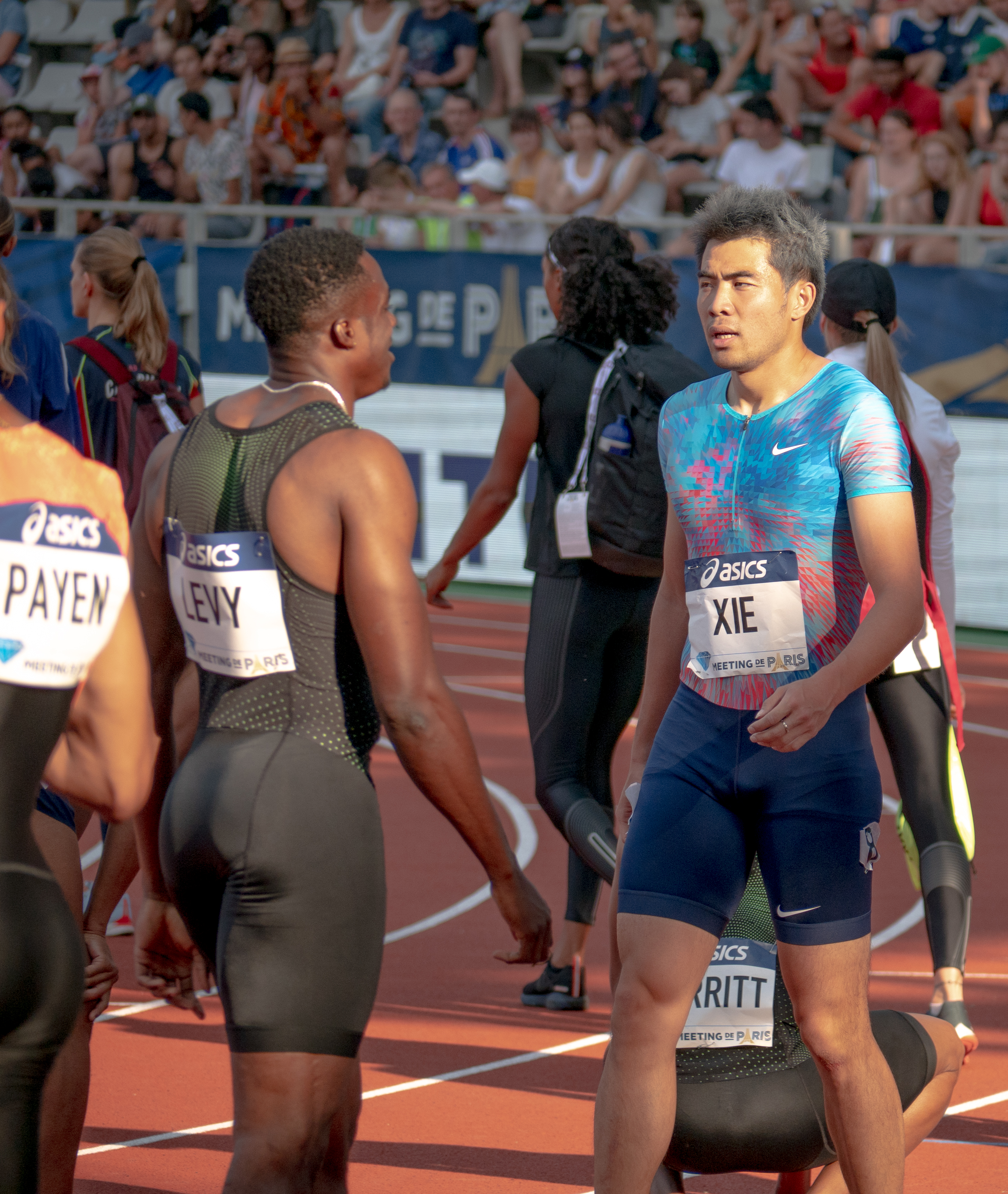
- Xie Wenjun in 2018

Personal information
- Born: 11 July 1990 (age 36) Shanghai, China
- Height: 190 cm (6 ft 3 in)
- Weight: 87 kg (192 lb)

Sport
- Country: China
- Sport: Athletics
- Events: 60 m hurdles, 110 m hurdles

Achievements and titles
- Personal bests: 60 m hurdles: 7.60 (Birmingham 2013); 110 m hurdles: 13.17 (Shanghai 2019)
Medal record
Event	1st	2nd	3rd
Asian Games	2	0	0
Asian Championships	2	0	0
Total	4	0	0
Representing China
Asian Games
Gold medal – first place	2014 Incheon	110 m hurdles
Gold medal – first place	2018 Jakarta-Palembang	110 m hurdles
Asian Championships
Gold medal – first place	2015 Wuhan	110 m hurdles
Gold medal – first place	2019 Doha	110 m hurdles

Xie Wenjun (Chinese: 谢文骏, born 11 July 1990) is a Chinese hurdler specializing in the 110 metres hurdles. He represented his country at the 2012 Summer Olympics, narrowly missing the final. He also competed at the 2016 Olympics.

== International competitions ==
Year	Competition	Venue	Position	Event	Notes
Representing China
2009	Universiade	Belgrade, Serbia	9th (sf)	110 m hurdles	13.93
2012	Olympic Games	London, United Kingdom	9th (sf)	110 m hurdles	13.34
2013	World Championships	Moscow, Russia	21st (h)	110 m hurdles	13.59
2014	Continental Cup	Marrakesh, Morocco	4th	110 m hurdles	13.44
2014	Asian Games	Incheon, South Korea	1st	110 m hurdles	13.36
2015	World Championships	Beijing, China	15th (sf)	110m hurdles	13.39
2015	Asian Championships	Wuhan, China	1st	110 m hurdles	13.56
2016	World Indoor Championships	Portland, United States	16th (sf)	60 m hurdles	7.90
2016	Olympic Games	Rio de Janeiro, Brazil	27th (h)	110 m hurdles	13.69
2017	World Championships	London, United Kingdom	12th (sf)	110 m hurdles	13.36
2018	World Indoor Championships	Birmingham, United Kingdom	20th (sf)	60 m hurdles	7.76
2018	Asian Games	Jakarta, Indonesia	1st	110 m hurdles	13.34
2019	Asian Championships	Doha, Qatar	1st	110 m hurdles	13.21
2019	World Championships	Doha, Qatar	5th	110 m hurdles	13.29
2021	Olympic Games	Tokyo, Japan	16th (sf)	110 m hurdles	13.58
2022	World Championships	Eugene, United States	25th (h)	110 m hurdles	13.58
