= Chan Chung Wang =

Hong Kong track and field athlete

Chan Chung Wang (Chinese: 陳仲泓; born 10 June 1991) is a Hong Kong track and field athlete. He was named the best male athlete in Hong Kong in 2019. Chan competed in the 2020 Summer Olympics in Tokyo in the men's 110 meter hurdles.
