= 2013 World Youth Championships in Athletics – Boys' 110 metres hurdles =

Boys' 110 metres hurdles at the 2013 World Youth Championships in Athletics
- Venue: RSC Olimpiyskiy
- Dates: 11 July (heats); 12 July (semifinal & final)
- Competitors: 48
- Winning time: 13.13 CR

Medalists
gold medal	Jaheel Hyde	Jamaica
silver medal	Marlon Humphrey	United States
bronze medal	Lu Yang	China

The boys' 110 metres hurdles at the 2013 World Youth Championships in Athletics was held from 11 to 12 July.

== Medalists ==
Gold	Silver	Bronze
Jaheel Hyde; Jamaica	Marlon Humphrey; United States	Lu Yang; China

== Records ==
Prior to the competition, the following records were as follows.

World Youth Best	Wilhem Belocian (FRA)	13.12	Lens, France	21 July 2012
Championship Record	Wayne Davis (USA)	13.18	Ostrava, Czech Republic	12 July 2007
World Youth Leading	Roger Iribarne (CUB)	13.33	Havana, Cuba	15 February 2013

== Heats ==
Qualification rule: first 3 of each heat (Q) and the next 6 fastest (q) qualified.

=== Heat 1 ===
Rank	Lane	Name	Nationality	Time	Notes
1	1	Gerard Mateu Porras	Spain	13.91	Q
2	5	Dawid Żebrowski	Poland	13.94	Q
3	2	Thomas Delmeule	France	14.13	Q
4	4	Óscar Palacios	Colombia	14.15	
5	6	Vitaliy Zems	Kazakhstan	14.38	
6	7	Ang Ding Hui	Singapore	14.42	SB
7	3	Peter-John Waterboer	South Africa	14.60	
8	8	Abdulla Atiq	Qatar	14.77	

=== Heat 2 ===
Rank	Lane	Name	Nationality	Time	Notes
1	3	Naoya Kawamura	Japan	13.86	Q, PB
2	4	Roger Iribarne	Cuba	13.92	Q
3	5	Ricardo Torres	Puerto Rico	13.93	Q, PB
4	8	Mihailo Stefanovic	Canada	13.98	q, PB
5	6	Xavier Coakley	Bahamas	14.05	q
6	2	Igor Jeronimo	Brazil	14.13	q
7	7	Bohdan Chornomaz	Ukraine	14.26	
8	1	Rivaldo Roberts	South Africa	14.28	

=== Heat 3 ===
Rank	Lane	Name	Nationality	Time	Notes
1	2	Ákos Boda	Hungary	13.92	Q, PB
2	4	Florian Lickteig	Germany	14.07	Q
3	5	Bashiru Abdullahi	Nigeria	14.08	Q, PB
4	7	Euan Dickson-Earle	Great Britain	14.10	q
5	3	Ville Aarnivala	Finland	14.21	
6	6	Luis Colombo	Venezuela	14.45	
7	8	Pier Battistini	Italy	14.84	
	1	Creve Armando Machava	Mozambique	DNS	

=== Heat 4 ===
Rank	Lane	Name	Nationality	Time	Notes
1	5	Jaheel Hyde	Jamaica	13.47	Q, PB
2	6	Henrik Hannemann	Germany	13.77	Q
3	8	Ifeanyi Atuma	Nigeria	13.83	Q, PB
4	7	Diego Del Mónaco	Chile	14.05	q
5	4	Rapolas Saulius	Lithuania	14.19	
6	3	Amine Bouanani	Algeria	14.39	
7	1	Aaron Lewis	Trinidad and Tobago	14.51	
8	2	Linus Feng	Singapore	16.50	

=== Heat 5 ===
Rank	Lane	Name	Nationality	Time	Notes
1	7	Marlon Humphrey	United States	13.42	Q, PB
2	5	Júlio Oliveira	Brazil	13.68	Q, PB
3	8	Charles Mitala	Sweden	13.95	Q
4	1	Gastón Sayago	Argentina	13.98	q, PB
5	4	Locky Butcher	Canada	14.15	PB
6	2	Samuel Cedeño	Venezuela	14.78	
7	3	Joshuán Berrios	Colombia	14.95	
8	6	Wang Yang	China	36.87	

=== Heat 6 ===
Rank	Lane	Name	Nationality	Time	Notes
1	2	Lu Yang	China	13.45	Q, PB
2	1	Isaiah Moore	United States	13.66	Q, PB
3	5	Sergey Solodov	Russia	14.26	Q
4	7	Salvador García	Mexico	14.30	
5	4	Leonardo Bizzoni	Italy	14.40	
6	3	Jordan Chin	Jamaica	14.46	
7	6	Bajram Muço	Albania	15.15	PB
	8	James Sandilands	New Zealand	DNF	

== Semifinals ==
Qualification rule: first 2 of each heat (Q) plus the 2 fastest times (q) qualified.

=== Heat 1 ===
Rank	Lane	Name	Nationality	Time	Notes
1	4	Lu Yang	China	13.59	Q
2	5	Isaiah Moore	United States	13.66	Q, PB
3	1	Igor Jeronimo	Brazil	13.84	PB
4	3	Gerard Mateu Porras	Spain	13.87	
5	6	Dawid Żebrowski	Poland	13.88	
6	7	Ricardo Torres	Puerto Rico	13.95	
7	8	Thomas Delmeule	France	13.99	
8	2	Gastón Sayago	Argentina	14.27	

=== Heat 2 ===
Rank	Lane	Name	Nationality	Time	Notes
1	4	Marlon Humphrey	United States	13.28	Q, WYL
2	2	Euan Dickson-Earle	Great Britain	13.48	Q, PB
3	8	Ifeanyi Atuma	Nigeria	13.58	q, PB
4	5	Júlio Oliveira	Brazil	13.64	PB
5	6	Ákos Boda	Hungary	13.70	PB
6	1	Mihailo Stefanovic	Canada	14.03	
7	7	Sergey Solodov	Russia	14.07	PB
8	3	Florian Lickteig	Germany	14.12	

=== Heat 3 ===
Rank	Lane	Name	Nationality	Time	Notes
1	3	Jaheel Hyde	Jamaica	13.22	Q, WYL
2	4	Roger Iribarne	Cuba	13.40	Q
3	5	Naoya Kawamura	Japan	13.61	q, PB
4	6	Henrik Hannemann	Germany	13.67	
5	7	Charles Mitala	Sweden	13.88	PB
6	2	Xavier Coakley	Bahamas	13.93	
7	1	Diego Del Mónaco	Chile	13.94	
8	8	Bashiru Abdullahi	Nigeria	14.02	PB

== Final ==
Rank	Lane	Name	Nationality	Time	Notes
1st place, gold medalist(s)	3	Jaheel Hyde	Jamaica	13.13	CR
2nd place, silver medalist(s)	5	Marlon Humphrey	United States	13.24	PB
3rd place, bronze medalist(s)	6	Lu Yang	China	13.33	PB
4	4	Roger Iribarne	Cuba	13.46	
5	7	Euan Dickson-Earle	Great Britain	13.62	
6	8	Isaiah Moore	United States	13.68	
7	2	Naoya Kawamura	Japan	13.78	
8	1	Ifeanyi Atuma	Nigeria	13.94	
