= Marlon Humphrey =

American football player (born 1996)

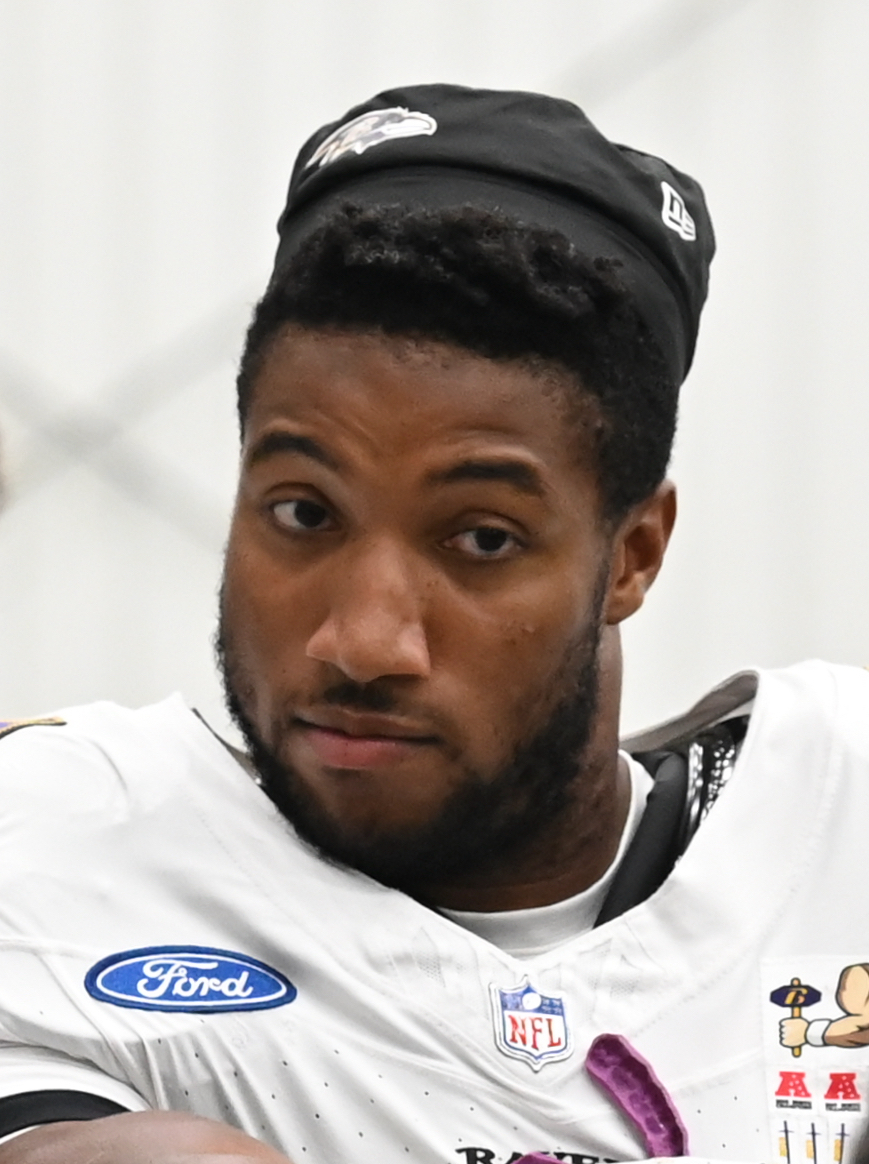
- Humphrey with the Baltimore Ravens in 2023

No. 44 – Baltimore Ravens
- Position: Cornerback
- Roster status: Active

Personal information
- Born: July 8, 1996 (age 30); Hoover, Alabama, U.S.
- Listed height: 6 ft 0 in (1.83 m)
- Listed weight: 200 lb (91 kg)

Career information
- High school: Hoover
- College: Alabama (2014–2016)
- NFL draft: 2017: 1st round, 16th overall pick

Career history
- Baltimore Ravens (2017–present)

Awards and highlights
- 2× First-team All-Pro (2019, 2024); 4× Pro Bowl (2019, 2020, 2022, 2024); NFL forced fumbles leader (2020); CFP national champion (2015); First-team All-American (2016)

Career NFL statistics as of Week 10, 2026
- Total tackles: 548
- Sacks: 7.0
- Forced fumbles: 19
- Fumble recoveries: 7
- Pass deflections: 113
- Interceptions: 23
- Defensive touchdowns: 3
- Stats at Pro Football Reference

Marlon N. Humphrey (born July 8, 1996) is an American professional football cornerback for the Baltimore Ravens of the National Football League (NFL). He attended Hoover High School, where he was named to the USA Today All-USA high school football team in 2012 and 2013. During his tenure, he won a silver medal in the 110 metres hurdles at the 2013 World Youth Championships in Donetsk, Ukraine. He also was named as a USA Today All-American Track and Field Team.

Humphrey played college football for the Alabama Crimson Tide in 2015 and 2016. During his stint, he intended to compete in track and football, but went on to focus just on football. In 2015, he and the Alabama football team won the CFP National Championship. In 2016, he was named to the College Football All-America Team. Humphrey was selected in the first round of the 2017 NFL draft by the Baltimore Ravens, with whom he has spent his entire professional career. He earned Pro Bowl honors in 2019, 2020, 2022, and 2024, and was selected as a first-team All-Pro in 2019 and 2024.

== Early life ==
A native of Hoover, Alabama, Humphrey attended Hoover High School, where he was a three-time All-State selection. During his junior and senior seasons, Hoover went a combined 30–1, winning AHSAA 6A State Championships in 2013. Humphrey was named as a USA Today High School All-American for the 2012 and 2013 seasons. Humphrey was a highly-touted five-star prospect in the class of 2014 and received nine offers from Power Five schools, including Alabama, Florida State, UCLA, Auburn, Clemson, Georgia, Michigan State, North Carolina, South Carolina, and Tennessee. Humphrey was vocal about his preference for attending Alabama and officially visited only Mississippi, Florida State, and Alabama, officially committing to the latter on January 29, 2014.

He was rated as high as the ninth-best recruit in the country, and three major recruiting websites all listed him as a top five player at his position. Rivals.com ranked Humphrey the highest positionally, behind only Jabrill Peppers. 247Sports.com ranked him third behind Tony Brown and Adoree' Jackson, and ESPN.com ranked him fifth behind Peppers, Brown, Jackson, and Teez Tabor. Rivals and 247Sports listed Humphrey as the best recruit from the state of Alabama in his class, while ESPN ranked him second behind Bo Scarbrough.

Medal record

Men's athletics

Representing the United States

World Youth Championships
Silver medal – second place	2013 Donetsk	110 m hurdles

In high school, Humphrey also competed at a world-class level in track. He won a silver medal in the 110 metres hurdles with a time of 13.24 seconds at the 2013 World Youth Championships in Donetsk, Ukraine. He lost to Jaheel Hyde of Jamaica, who established a new championship record and came .01 seconds shy of tying the World Youth Best held by Wilhem Belocian. Humphrey was also named to the USA Today All-American Track and Field Team. He still holds the State indoor track records for the 60 m (6.89), 60 m high hurdles (7.8), 400 m (48.11), and 4 x 400 m relay (3:21.76).

College recruiting
Name	Hometown	School	Height	Weight	40^{‡}	Commit date
Marlon Humphrey; CB	Hoover, AL	Hoover (AL)	6 ft 1 in (1.85 m)	196 lb (89 kg)	4.48	Jan 29, 2014
Marlon Humphrey; CB	Recruit ratings: Rivals: 247Sports: ESPN: (90)					
Overall recruit ranking: Rivals: 9 247Sports: 11 ESPN: 15
Note: In many cases, Scout, Rivals, 247Sports, On3, and ESPN may conflict in their listings of height and weight.; In these cases, the average was taken. ESPN grades are on a 100-point scale.; Sources: "Marlon Humphrey, 2014". Rivals.; "2014 Team Ranking". Rivals.com.

== College career ==
Humphrey intended to compete in football and track for the Crimson Tide. After redshirting his initial year in 2014, he became a starter at cornerback in 2015.

In 2015, Humphrey earned the starting cornerback job in his first game against Wisconsin. He ranked second on the team in interceptions with three during the 2015 season. Humphrey was an essential part of an elite 2015 Alabama defense earning Freshman All-American rights. The team went on to win their 16th national championship, with Humphrey recovering a key onside kick midway through the fourth quarter of the game.

Humphrey started 2016 with the team's first interception for a touchdown against USC, and started 14 games. Humphrey continued to dominate opposing receivers the rest of the season, and declared his early departure from the collegiate level for the NFL draft. He was named a first-team All-American for his performance during the 2016 season.

=== College statistics ===
Season	Team	Conf	Pos	GP	Tackles				Interceptions					Fumbles	
Season	Team	Conf	Pos	GP	Solo	Cmb	Ast	Sck	PD	Int	Yds	Avg	TD	FF	FR
2014	Alabama	SEC	DB	0	Redshirt										
2015	Alabama	SEC	DB	15	35	45	10	0.0	8	3	28	9.3	0	2	0
2016	Alabama	SEC	DB	14	26	36	10	0.0	5	2	18	9.0	1	1	0
Career				29	61	81	20	0	13	5	46	9.2	1	3	0

== Professional career ==
=== Pre-draft ===
He attended the NFL Combine and completed nearly all of the drills, excluding the shuttle and vertical. He attended pre-draft visits with the Philadelphia Eagles, Buffalo Bills, Dallas Cowboys, and Pittsburgh Steelers. ESPN analyst Mel Kiper Jr. ranked him as the second best cornerback prospect in the draft. Scouts Inc. had Humphrey listed as the third best cornerback prospect (23rd overall) in the draft. NFL analysts Bucky Brooks and Mike Mayock had him ranked as the third best cornerback in the draft. Jeff Legwold of ESPN ranked him as the fourth best cornerback (24th overall) in the draft. Sports Illustrated had Humphrey ranked as the fifth best cornerback in the draft. NFL draft analysts projected Humphrey to be selected in the first round of the 2017 NFL Draft.

External videos
- Marlon Humphrey's Combine Workout
- Humphrey runs 4.41s 40-yard dash

Pre-draft measurables
Height	Weight	Arm length	Hand span	Wingspan	40-yard dash	10-yard split	20-yard split	Three-cone drill	Broad jump	Bench press
6 ft 0 1/4 in (1.84 m)	197 lb (89 kg)	32 1/4 in (0.82 m)	8 3/4 in (0.22 m)	6 ft 4 1/4 in (1.94 m)	4.41 s	1.52 s	2.57 s	6.75 s	10 ft 5 in (3.18 m)	10 reps
All values from NFL Combine

=== 2017 ===
The Baltimore Ravens selected Humphrey in the first round (16th overall) of the 2017 NFL draft. He was the second cornerback to be drafted in 2017, after the New Orleans Saints selected Ohio State cornerback Marshon Lattimore (11th overall). He became the fourth cornerback selected in the first round by the Baltimore Ravens and their third highest cornerback drafted, only behind 10th overall picks Chris McAlister (1999) and Duane Starks (1998).

External videos
- Ravens select Marlon Humphrey No. 16
- Instant Draft Grade: Marlon Humphrey

On May 5, 2017, the Ravens signed Humphrey to a fully guaranteed four–year, $11.84 million contract that also included an initial signing bonus of $6.75 million.

Throughout training camp, he competed against Brandon Carr for a role as a starting cornerback. Head coach John Harbaugh named Humphrey the third cornerback on the depth chart to begin the regular season, behind starters Jimmy Smith and Brandon Carr.

On September 10, 2017, Humphrey made his professional regular season debut in the Baltimore Ravens' season-opening 20–0 victory at the Cincinnati Bengals. On October 8, 2017, Humphrey earned his first career start as a nickelback and recorded three combined tackles (two solo) during a 30–17 win at the Oakland Raiders in Week 5. On November 19, 2017, he recorded three combined tackles, deflected two passes, and made his first career interception on a pass thrown by Brett Hundley to wide receiver Jordy Nelson during a 23–0 victory at the Green Bay Packers. In Week 13, he collected a season-high seven combined tackles (five solo), broke up a pass, and intercepted a pass by Matthew Stafford to wide receiver Marvin Jones during a 44–20 win against the Detroit Lions. He was promoted to starting cornerback for the last four regular season games after Jimmy Smith was placed on injured reserve after tearing his Achilles tendon. He finished his rookie season in 2017 with 34 combined tackles (30 solo), 11 pass deflections, and two interceptions in 16 games and five starts. He received an overall grade of 70.7 from Pro Football Focus in 2017.

=== 2018 ===
On January 9, 2018, the Baltimore Ravens promoted linebackers coach Don Martindale to defensive coordinator after the retirement of Dean Pees. Throughout training camp, Humphrey competed against Brandon Carr to be a starting cornerback. Head coach John Harbaugh named Humphrey the No. 1 starting cornerback to begin the regular season and paired him with Brandon Carr after Jimmy Smith was suspended for the first four games for violating the league's personal conduct policy.

On September 13, 2018, Humphrey collected a season-high seven combined tackles (five solo) during a 23–24 loss at the Cincinnati Bengals. He was inactive for two consecutive injuries (Weeks 8–9) after sustaining a thing injury. On December 16, 2018, he recorded two solo tackles, a season-high four pass deflections, and intercepted a pass thrown by Jameis Winston to wide receiver Mike Evans as the Ravens defeated the Tampa Bay Buccaneers 20–12. He finished the season with 14 games with eight starts and had a total of 37 combined tackles (31 solo), a team-leading 15 pass deflections, two forced fumbles, and two interceptions. He was given a grade of 80.0 by Pro Football Focus, which ranked 11th among all cornerbacks.

=== 2019 ===
During training camp, he competed for the role as the No. 2 starting cornerback against Brandon Carr. He changed his jersey number from No. 29 to No. 44 as a show of goodwill to accommodate the newly acquired free agent safety Earl Thomas. Head coach John Harbaugh named Humphrey the No. 2 starting cornerback to begin the regular season and paired him with Jimmy Smith.

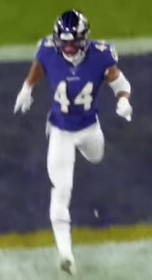
Humphrey in the 2019 Divisional playoff matchup against the Tennessee Titans.

On September 8, 2019, Humphrey started in the Baltimore Ravens' season-opener at the Miami Dolphins and made one solo tackle, set a season-high with two pass deflections, and intercepted a pass by Josh Rosen to wide receiver Jakeem Grant during a 59–10 victory. In Week 4, after getting into an altercation with Odell Beckham Jr., Humphrey was seen pinning him to the turf and it initially appeared that he was choking Beckham Jr., but after the game a video close-up released by the Ravens showed Humphrey's hands were grabbing Beckham's jersey and did not touch his neck. After the Ravens' 25–40 loss to the Cleveland Browns, Humphrey apologized to Beckham and said that his response was not a brand of football he wanted to represent. The following week, he recorded three solo tackles, made one pass deflection, and forced a crucial fumble by wide receiver JuJu Smith-Schuster that he would recover to set up the game-winning field goal by Justin Tucker in the 26–23 win at the Pittsburgh Steelers in Week 5. On October 20, 2019, Humphrey recorded five combined tackles (four solo) and returned a fumble 18–yards for the first touchdown of his career after it was fumbled by rookie wide receiver DK Metcalf during the 30–16 win at the Seattle Seahawks. The following game, he recorded six combined tackles (five solo) and recovered a fumble that teammate Patrick Onwuasor forced by wide receiver Julian Edelman for a 70–yard touchdown during a 37–20 win against the New England Patriots in Week 9. This became his second consecutive game with a touchdown, while his 70–yard touchdown also set the record for longest fumble recovery return for a touchdown in Ravens' franchise history. On December 1, 2019, he set a season-high with seven solo tackles as the Ravens defeated the San Francisco 49ers 20–17. In Week 16, he recorded four combined tackles (three solo), broke up a pass, and intercepted a pass by Baker Mayfield to wide receiver Odell Beckham Jr. late in the fourth quarter to help secure a 31–15 win at the Cleveland Browns. At the end of the season, Humphrey had a total of 65 combined tackles (53 solo), 14 pass deflections, three interceptions, set a career-high with three fumble recoveries, made two forced fumbles, and set a career-high with two touchdowns, while appearing in all 16 games with 15 credited starts. He was named to the Pro Bowl for the first time in his career and was also selected for the AP 2019 All-Pro Team. He was ranked 86th by his fellow players on the NFL Top 100 Players of 2020. Pro Football Focus had Humphrey finish the season with an overall grade of 70.5.

=== 2020 ===
On April 28, 2020, the Baltimore Ravens officially exercised the fifth–year option on Humphrey's rookie contract for a guaranteed one–year, $10.24 million. He entered training camp slated as the de facto No. 1 starting cornerback, while Jimmy Smith was replaced by newly acquired free agent Marcus Peters. Head coach John Harbaugh named Humphrey and Marcus Peters the starting cornerbacks to begin the season.

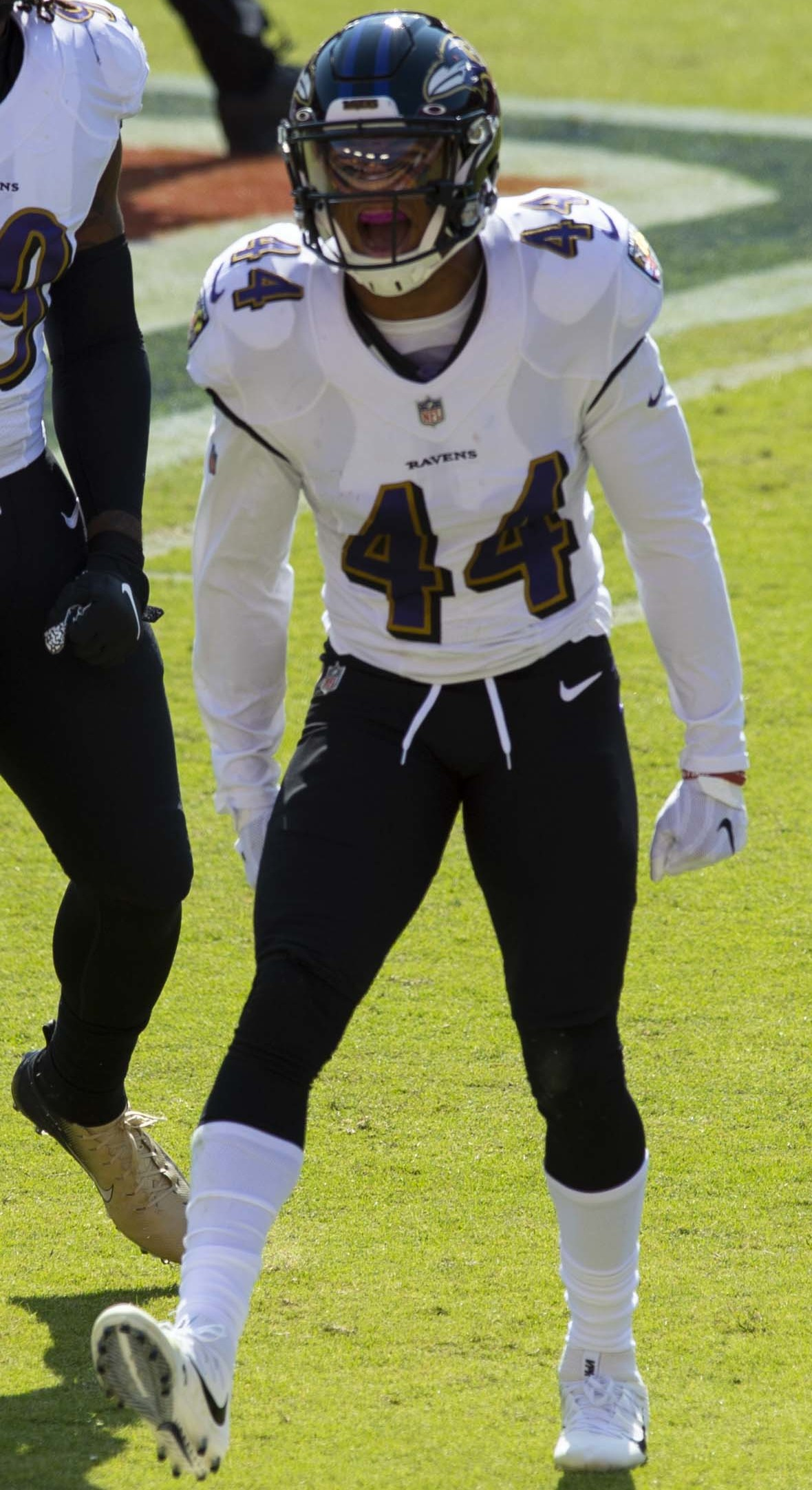
Humphrey playing for the Baltimore Ravens in 2020.

On September 13, 2020, Humphrey started in the Ravens' home-opener against the Cleveland Browns and made one solo tackle, two pass deflections, and had his only interception of the season on a pass by Baker Mayfield to wide receiver KhaDarel Hodge on the opening drive as the Ravens won 38–6. On October 1, 2020, the Baltimore Ravens signed Humphrey to a five–year, $97.50 million contract extension that included $67.32 million guaranteed, $40.32 million guaranteed upon signing, and an initial signing bonus of $20.00 million.

In Week 4, he set a season-high with nine combined tackles (eight solo) during a 31–17 victory at the Washington Football Team. The following week, Humphrey recorded five combined tackles (four solo) and had his first career solo sack on Joe Burrow for an eight–yard loss as the Ravens defeated the Cincinnati Bengals 27–3 in Week 5. He also forced a fumble on wide receiver Mike Thomas which was returned for a 53–yard touchdown by teammate Patrick Queen. On November 2, 2020, the Ravens placed Humphrey on the reserve/COVID-19 list. On November 11, 2020, he was officially activated from the COVID-19/reserve list and added back to the active roster after missing a 24–10 win at the Indianapolis Colts in Week 9. He finished the season with a total of 82 combined tackles (70 solo), 11 pass deflections, 2.5 sacks, one interception, and set a career-high with eight forced fumbles in 15 games and 15 starts. He was voted to the 2021 Pro Bowl and was also ranked 38th by his fellow players on the NFL Top 100 Players of 2021. He received an overall grade of 76.4 from Pro Football Focus in 2020.

=== 2021 ===
He returned to training camp slated as a starting cornerback alongside Marcus Peters. Head coach John Harbaugh named Humphrey and Marcus Peters the starting cornerbacks to begin the season. On September 8, 2021, the Baltimore Ravens placed Marcus Peters on injured reserve for the entire season due to a torn ACL and replaced him with Anthony Averett entering the regular season.

On September 13, 2021, Humphrey started in the Baltimore Ravens' season-opener at the Las Vegas Raiders and set a season-high with nine combined tackles (six solo) and made one pass deflection as they won in overtime 27–33. In Week 7, he made seven combined tackles (four solo), one pass deflection, and made his lone interception of the season on a pass by Joe Burrow to wide receiver Ja'Marr Chase during a 17–41 loss to the Cincinnati Bengals. In Week 13, he recorded three solo tackles during a 19-20 loss at the Pittsburgh Steelers, but suffered an injury during the game. On December 7, 2021, the Baltimore Ravens officially placed Humphrey on injured reserve due to a torn pectoral muscle and he remained inactive for the last five games (Weeks 14–18) of the season. He finished with a total of 58 combined tackles (44 solo), 13 pass deflections, an interception, and a forced fumble in 12 games and 12 starts.

=== 2022 ===
Humphrey started the 2022 season as a starting cornerback alongside Marcus Peters and starting nickelback Kyle Fuller.

In Week 11, Humphrey made two tackles, one pass deflection, and secured the Ravens' 13–3 victory against the Carolina Panthers by intercepting a pass by Sam Darnold to wide receiver Shi Smith with 3:35 remaining late in the fourth quarter. In Week 13, Humphrey made seven combined tackles (five solo) and set a career-high with his third sack of the season on Russell Wilson during a 10–9 win against the Denver Broncos. On December 24, 2022, he set a season-high with seven solo tackles and forced a fumble as the Ravens defeated the Atlanta Falcons 17–9. He started all 17 games for the first time in his career and finished with a total of 71 combined tackles (53 solo), seven pass deflections, three interceptions, a career-high three sacks, two fumble recoveries, and a forced fumble. He was ranked 92nd by his fellow players on the NFL Top 100 Players of 2023. He received an overall grade of 76.7 from Pro Football Focus in 2022.

=== 2023 ===
On August 16, 2023, the Ravens reported that Humphrey would undergo surgery on his foot due to an ongoing injury. He was supposed subsequently inactive for the first four games (Weeks 1–4) of the season. Upon his return, head coach John Harbaugh named him the No. 1 starting cornerback alongside Brandon Stephens and backup cornerbacks Arthur Maulet, Rock Ya-Sin, and Ronald Darby.

In Week 5, Humphrey made his season debut and set a season-high with four solo tackles during a 10–17 loss at the Pittsburgh Steelers. On November 12, 2023, Humphrey recorded three solo tackles before exiting in the third quarter of a 31–33 loss to the Cleveland Browns due to an ankle injury. He was subsequently diagnosed with a calf strain and remained inactive for the next two games (Weeks 11–12). In Week 16, Humphrey made three combined tackles (two solo), set a season-high with two pass deflections, and made his only interception of the season on a pass thrown by Brock Purdy to wide receiver Deebo Samuel during a 33–19 victory at the San Francisco 49ers. In Week 17, he recorded one solo tackle before re-injuring his calf as the Ravens defeated the Miami Dolphins 56–19. He remained sidelined for the Ravens' 10–17 loss to the Pittsburgh Steelers in Week 18 due to his calf injury. He finished with 26 combined tackles (22 solo), five passes defended, and one interception, while appearing in ten games with ten starts. He received an overall grade of 65.3 from Pro Football Focus in 2023.

=== 2024 ===
On February 1, 2024, the Baltimore Ravens announced their decision to promote Zachary Orr to defensive coordinator following the departure of Mike MacDonald. Humphrey was retained as the No. 1 starting cornerback and led a group of cornerbacks that included Brandon Stephens, Jalyn Armour-Davis, Nate Wiggins, and Trayvon Mullen.

On September 15, 2024, Humphrey set a season-high with ten combined tackles (eight solo), made one pass deflection, and had his first interception of the season on a pass by Gardner Minshew to tight end Harrison Bryant during a 23–26 loss against the Las Vegas Raiders. In Week 7, Humphrey made two solo tackles, two pass deflections, and set a career-high with two interceptions on passes by Baker Mayfield before exiting in the second quarter of a 41–31 victory at the Tampa Bay Buccaneers after injuring his knee while making his second interception. His knee injury would sideline him for the Ravens' 24–29 loss at the Cleveland Browns in Week 8. On December 31, 2024, Humphrey recorded three combined tackles (two solo), made one pass deflection, and made the first pick-six of his career as the Ravens defeated the Pittsburgh Steelers 34–17. He intercepted a pass thrown by Russell Wilson to tight end MyCole Pruitt in the fourth quarter and returned it for a 37–yard touchdown. He finished the season with 67 combined tackles (50 solo), set a career-high with 15 pass deflections, made a career-high six interceptions, made two forced fumbles, and scored one touchdown in 16 games and 16 starts. Humphrey would also be named to his fourth Pro Bowl as well as being named first-team All Pro, being selected as a slot cornerback. He received an overall grade of 81.0 from Pro Football Focus, which ranked 8th amongst 222 qualifying cornerbacks in 2024.

=== 2026 ===
In November 2026, Humphrey uploaded a now-deleted episode of his podcast, in which he said that Baltimore was the "best at making criminals" during a discussion about a local distillery winning a prestigious award. He later apologized for his remarks following backlash, including from Baltimore mayor Brandon Scott. In response, Ravens head coach Jesse Minter suspended Humphrey for the Ravens' game against the Carolina Panthers.

== NFL career statistics ==
Legend
	Led the league
**Bold**	Career high

=== Regular season ===
Year	Team	Games		Tackles				Interceptions					Fumbles			
Year	Team	GP	GS	Cmb	Solo	Ast	Sck	PD	Int	Yds	Avg	TD	FF	FR	Yds	TD
2017	BAL	16	5	34	30	4	0.0	11	2	33	**16.5**	0	0	0	0	0
2018	BAL	14	8	37	31	6	0.0	**15**	2	0	0.0	0	1	0	0	0
2019	BAL	16	15	65	53	12	0.0	14	3	14	4.7	0	2	**3**	**91**	**2**
2020	BAL	15	15	**82**	**70**	12	2.5	11	1	8	8.0	0	**8**	0	0	0
2021	BAL	12	12	58	44	14	0.0	13	1	0	0.0	0	1	0	0	0
2022	BAL	**17**	**17**	71	53	**18**	**3.0**	7	3	26	8.7	0	1	2	26	0
2023	BAL	10	10	26	22	4	0.0	5	1	3	3.0	0	0	0	0	0
2024	BAL	16	16	67	50	17	0.5	**15**	**6**	37	6.2	**1**	2	0	0	0
2025	BAL	15	15	68	53	15	1.0	13	4	**54**	13.5	0	2	1	0	0
2026	BAL	10	10	40	23	17	0.0	9	0	0	0.0	0	2	1	0	0
Career		141	123	548	429	119	7.0	113	23	175	7.6	1	19	7	91	2

=== Playoffs ===
Year	Team	Games		Tackles				Interceptions					Fumbles			
Year	Team	GP	GS	Cmb	Solo	Ast	Sck	PD	Int	Yds	Avg	TD	FF	FR	Yds	TD
2018	BAL	1	1	1	1	0	0.0	0	0	0	0.0	0	0	0	0	0
2019	BAL	1	1	2	2	0	0.0	0	0	0	0.0	0	0	0	0	0
2020	BAL	2	2	7	5	2	0.0	**1**	0	0	0.0	0	0	0	0	0
2022	BAL	1	1	6	**6**	0	0.0	0	0	0	0.0	0	0	0	0	0
2023	BAL	1	0	1	1	0	0.0	0	0	0	0.0	0	0	0	0	0
2024	BAL	2	2	**8**	4	**4**	0.0	0	0	0	0.0	0	0	0	0	0
Career		8	7	25	19	6	0.0	1	0	0	0.0	0	0	0	0	0
