= 2016 IAAF World U20 Championships – Men's 400 metres hurdles =

The men's 400 metres hurdles event at the 2016 IAAF World U20 Championships was held at Zdzisław Krzyszkowiak Stadium on 21, 22 and 23 July.

== Medalists ==
Gold	Jaheel Hyde; Jamaica
Silver	Taylor McLaughlin; United States
Bronze	Kyron McMaster; British Virgin Islands

== Records ==
Standing records prior to the 2016 IAAF World U20 Championships in Athletics
World Junior Record	Danny Harris (USA)	48.02	Los Angeles, United States	17 June 1984
Championship Record	Kerron Clement (USA)	48.51	Grosseto, Italy	16 July 2004
World Junior Leading	Jaheel Hyde (JAM)	48.81	Kingston, Jamaica	1 July 2016

== Results ==
=== Heats ===
Qualification: First 3 of each heat (Q) and the 3 fastest times (q) qualified for the semifinals.

Rank	Heat	Name	Nationality	Time	Note
1	2	Kefilwe Mogawane	South Africa	50.53	Q
2	4	Jaheel Hyde	Jamaica	50.81	Q
3	6	Yoshiro Watanabe	Japan	51.10	Q
4	2	Taylor McLaughlin	United States	51.28	Q
5	4	Santhosh Tamilarasan	India	51.46	Q, PB
6	5	Mohamed Fares Jlassi	Tunisia	51.49	Q, PB
7	1	Mikael de Jesus	Brazil	51.50	Q
8	5	Ned Justeen Azemia	Seychelles	51.50	Q, NU20R
9	5	Tatsuhiro Yamamoto	Japan	51.51	Q
10	1	Timor Barrett	Jamaica	51.56	Q, PB
11	7	Rivaldo Leacock	Barbados	51.62	Q
12	6	Dominik Hufnagl	Austria	51.72	Q
13	3	Kyron McMaster	British Virgin Islands	51.77	Q
14	5	Wang Yijie	China	51.83	q
15	2	Hrvoje Čukman	Croatia	51.89	Q, PB
16	4	Gabriele Montefalcone	Italy	51.91	Q
17	7	Maksims Sinčukovs	Latvia	52.04	Q
18	7	Gong Debin	China	52.11	Q
19	3	Victor Coroller	France	52.16	Q
20	3	Kim Hyun-bin	South Korea	52.27	Q
21	4	Viktor Nylander	Sweden	52.30	q
22	1	Matěj Mach	Czech Republic	52.32	Q
23	5	Aftab Alam	India	52.34	q, PB
24	4	Uditha Chandrasena	Sri Lanka	52.63	
25	1	Branson Rolle	Bahamas	52.69	
26	7	Dylan Owusu	Belgium	52.79	
27	3	Sinan Ören	Turkey	53.19	
28	7	Alisher Pulotov	Tajikistan	53.27	PB
29	6	Mohamed Reda Elbilaoui	Morocco	53.34	Q
30	7	Dangel Cotto	Puerto Rico	53.34	
31	7	Federico Cesati	Italy	53.35	
32	4	Jassam Mohammed Mayil	Iraq	53.48	
33	2	Michael Ramos	Puerto Rico	53.49	
34	2	Ephraim Lerkin	Papua New Guinea	53.67	
35	5	Mohammadreza Rahmani	Iran	53.71	
36	3	Mohamed Amine Touati	Tunisia	53.79	
37	3	José Humberto Bermúdez	Guatemala	53.89	
38	4	Kiryl Borys	Belarus	53.90	
39	1	Adam Yakobi	Israel	54.03	
40	3	Pablo Andrés Ibáñez	El Salvador	54.56	PB
41	1	Yolver Cumache	Venezuela	54.68	
42	1	Omphemetse Poo	Botswana	55.61	
43	5	Nicholus Kiprotich Chirchir	Kenya	56.90	
	6	Callum MacNab	Canada	DNF	q
	6	Nomenjanahary Rakotoarimiandry	Madagascar	DNF	
	2	Joshuán Berrios	Colombia	DQ	R163.3(a)
	2	Timothy Emoghene	Nigeria	DQ	R163.3(a)
	6	Predea Manounou	France	DQ	168.7(a)
	6	Justin Alexander	United States	DQ	163.2(b)

=== Semifinals ===
Qualification: First 2 of each heat (Q) and the 2 fastest times (q) qualified for the final.

Rank	Heat	Name	Nationality	Time	Note
1	3	Jaheel Hyde	Jamaica	49.77	Q
2	3	Taylor McLaughlin	United States	50.25	Q
3	2	Kyron McMaster	British Virgin Islands	50.49	Q, SB
4	1	Mohamed Fares Jlassi	Tunisia	50.82	Q, NU20R
5	3	Tatsuhiro Yamamoto	Japan	50.84	q
6	3	Mikael de Jesus	Brazil	50.86	q
7	1	Yoshiro Watanabe	Japan	50.95	Q
8	3	Dominik Hufnagl	Austria	51.04	PB
9	2	Gong Debin	China	51.25	Q
10	3	Victor Coroller	France	51.35	
11	2	Timor Barrett	Jamaica	51.38	PB
12	1	Santhosh Tamilarasan	India	51.54	
13	1	Ned Justeen Azemia	Seychelles	51.64	
14	1	Gabriele Montefalcone	Italy	51.70	
15	1	Hrvoje Čukman	Croatia	51.82	PB
16	2	Maksims Sinčukovs	Latvia	51.89	PB
17	2	Rivaldo Leacock	Barbados	52.22	
18	1	Wang Yijie	China	52.28	
19	2	Kim Hyun-bin	South Korea	52.57	
20	3	Viktor Nylander	Sweden	52.79	
21	1	Mohamed Reda Elbilaoui	Morocco	53.49	
22	3	Matěj Mach	Czech Republic	53.49	
23	2	Callum MacNab	Canada	53.85	
	2	Kefilwe Mogawane	South Africa	DNF	
	2	Aftab Alam	India	DQ	R163.3(a)

=== Final ===
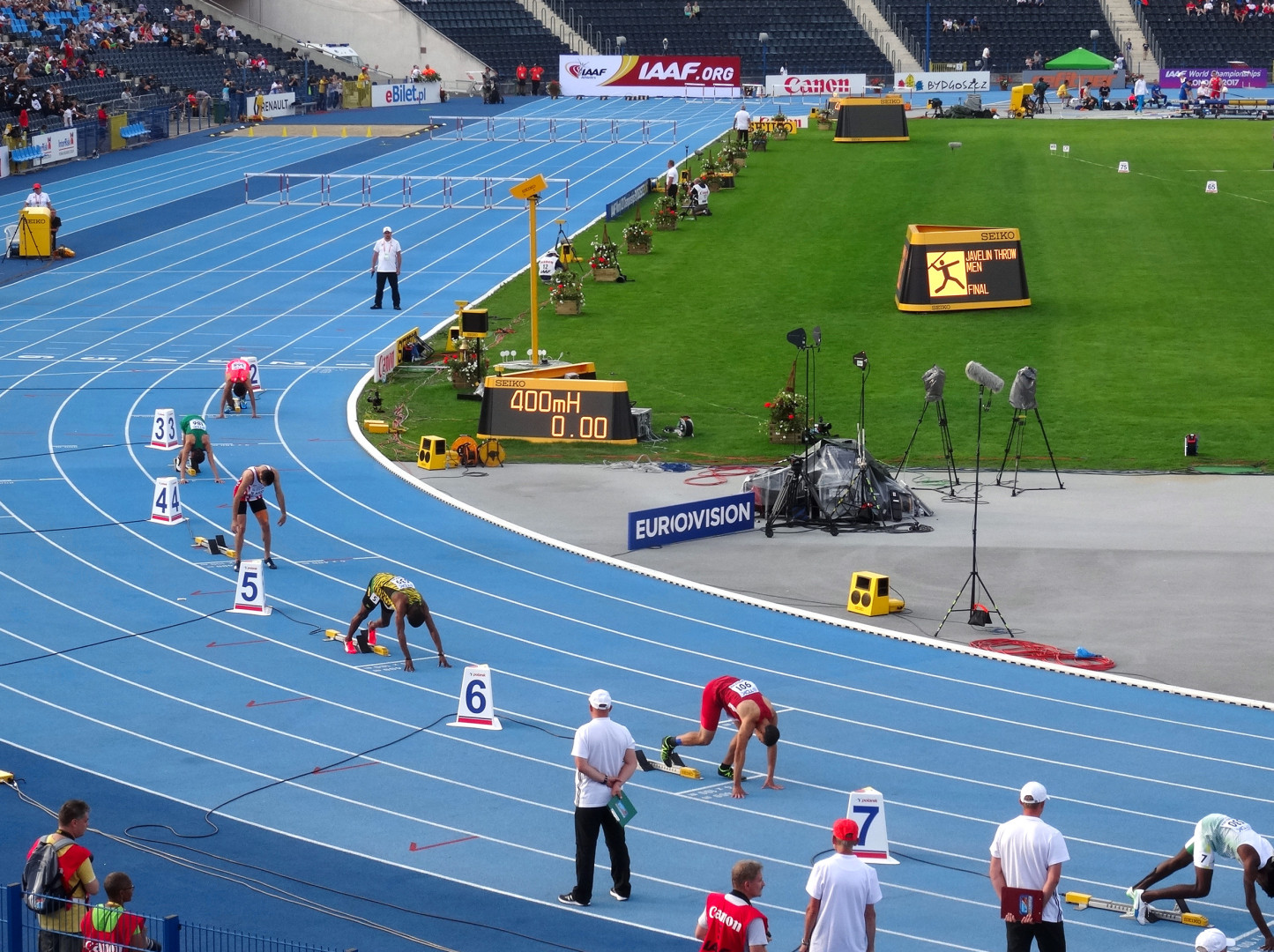
The finalists set in the blocks

Rank	Lane	Name	Nationality	Time	Note
1st place, gold medalist(s)	5	Jaheel Hyde	Jamaica	49.03	
2nd place, silver medalist(s)	6	Taylor McLaughlin	United States	49.45	PB
3rd place, bronze medalist(s)	7	Kyron McMaster	British Virgin Islands	49.56	NU20R
4	3	Mikael de Jesus	Brazil	50.06	
5	2	Tatsuhiro Yamamoto	Japan	50.99	
6	8	Gong Debin	China	51.03	
7	9	Yoshiro Watanabe	Japan	51.09	
8	4	Mohamed Fares Jlassi	Tunisia	52.14	
