= Athletics at the 2014 Summer Youth Olympics – Boys' 110 metre hurdles =

Athletics – Boys' 110 metres hurdles at the II Summer Youth Olympic Games
- Venue: Nanjing Olympic Sports Centre
- Date: August 20–23
- Competitors: 20 from 20 nations

Medalists
| 1st place, gold medalist(s) | | Jaheel Hyde | Jamaica |
| 2nd place, silver medalist(s) | | Henrik Hannemann | Germany |
| 3rd place, bronze medalist(s) | | Kim Gyeong-Tae | South Korea |

The boys’ 110 metres hurdles competition at the 2014 Summer Youth Olympics was held on 20–23 August 2014 in Nanjing Olympic Sports Center.

== Schedule ==
| Date | Time | Round |
|---|---|---|
| 20 August 2014 | 19:45 | Heats |
| 23 August 2014 | 19:55 | Final |

== Results ==
=== Heats ===
Eight fastest athletes advanced to Final A, the others advanced to Final B or C according to their times.

| Rank | Heat | Lane | Athlete | Result | Notes | Q |
|---|---|---|---|---|---|---|
| 1 | 1 | 7 | Jaheel Hyde (JAM) | 13.16 | PB | FA |
| 2 | 2 | 3 | Kim Gyeong-Tae (KOR) | 13.50 | PB | FA |
| 3 | 2 | 6 | Amere Lattin (USA) | 13.53 | PB | FA |
| 4 | 3 | 8 | Henrik Hannemann (GER) | 13.55 | PB | FA |
| 5 | 1 | 5 | Juan José Garrancho (ESP) | 13.57 | | FA |
| 6 | 1 | 8 | Maymon Poulose (IND) | 13.64 | PB | FA |
| 6 | 3 | 4 | Dawid Żebrowski (POL) | 13.64 | | FA |
| 8 | 3 | 6 | Joshuán Berrios (COL) | 13.66 | | FA |
| 9 | 2 | 2 | Michael Nicholls (BAR) | 13.70 | | FB |
| 10 | 2 | 5 | Diego Del Mónaco (CHI) | 13.74 | | FB |
| 11 | 1 | 6 | Parinya Munaek (THA) | 13.78 | PB | FB |
| 12 | 3 | 3 | Tavonte Mott (BAH) | 13.86 | PB | FB |
| 13 | 1 | 2 | Vitor Venâncio (BRA) | 13.91 | | FB |
| 14 | 2 | 7 | Nicholas Andrews (AUS) | 13.92 | | FB |
| 14 | 1 | 3 | Amine Bouanani (ALG) | 13.92 | PB | FC |
| 16 | 3 | 5 | Nao Kanai (JPN) | 14.03 | | FC |
| 17 | 3 | 2 | Cheng Chi-Hung (TPE) | 14.09 | | FC |
| 18 | 1 | 4 | Samuel Cedeño (VEN) | 14.13 | | FC |
| 19 | 2 | 4 | Henok Masresha (ETH) | 14.36 | | FC |
| | 3 | 7 | Mohd Rizzua Muhammad (MAS) | DSQ | | FC |

=== Finals ===
==== Final A ====
| Rank | Final Placing | Lane | Athlete | Result | Notes |
|---|---|---|---|---|---|
| 1st place, gold medalist(s) | 1 | 6 | Jaheel Hyde (JAM) | 12.96 | PB |
| 2nd place, silver medalist(s) | 2 | 5 | Henrik Hannemann (GER) | 13.40 | PB |
| 3rd place, bronze medalist(s) | 3 | 4 | Kim Gyeong-Tae (KOR) | 13.43 | PB |
| 4 | 4 | 9 | Maymon Poulose (IND) | 13.57 | PB |
| 5 | 5 | 8 | Juan José Garrancho (ESP) | 13.59 | |
| 6 | 6 | 2 | Dawid Żebrowski (POL) | 13.71 | |
| 7 | 7 | 7 | Amere Lattin (USA) | 15.53 | |
| | | 3 | Joshuán Berrios (COL) | DSQ | |

==== Final B ====
| Rank | Final Placing | Lane | Athlete | Result | Notes |
|---|---|---|---|---|---|
| 1 | 8 | 6 | Diego Del Mónaco (CHI) | 13.76 | |
| 2 | 9 | 2 | Vitor Venâncio (BRA) | 13.81 | |
| 3 | 10 | 5 | Parinya Munaek (THA) | 13.93 | |
| 4 | 11 | 4 | Tavonte Mott (BAH) | 14.09 | |
| | | 3 | Michael Nicholls (BAR) | DNF | |
| | | 7 | Nicholas Andrews (AUS) | DNS | |

==== Final C ====
| Rank | Final Placing | Lane | Athlete | Result | Notes |
|---|---|---|---|---|---|
| 1 | 12 | 6 | Mohd Rizzua Muhammad (MAS) | 13.90 | |
| 2 | 13 | 3 | Nao Kanai (JPN) | 14.08 | |
| 3 | 14 | 5 | Samuel Cedeño (VEN) | 14.19 | |
| 4 | 15 | 2 | Amine Bouanani (ALG) | 14.19 | |
| 5 | 16 | 7 | Henok Masresha (ETH) | 14.21 | PB |
| 6 | 17 | 4 | Cheng Chi-Hung (TPE) | 14.40 | |
