= Yoshiro Watanabe =

Japanese hurdler

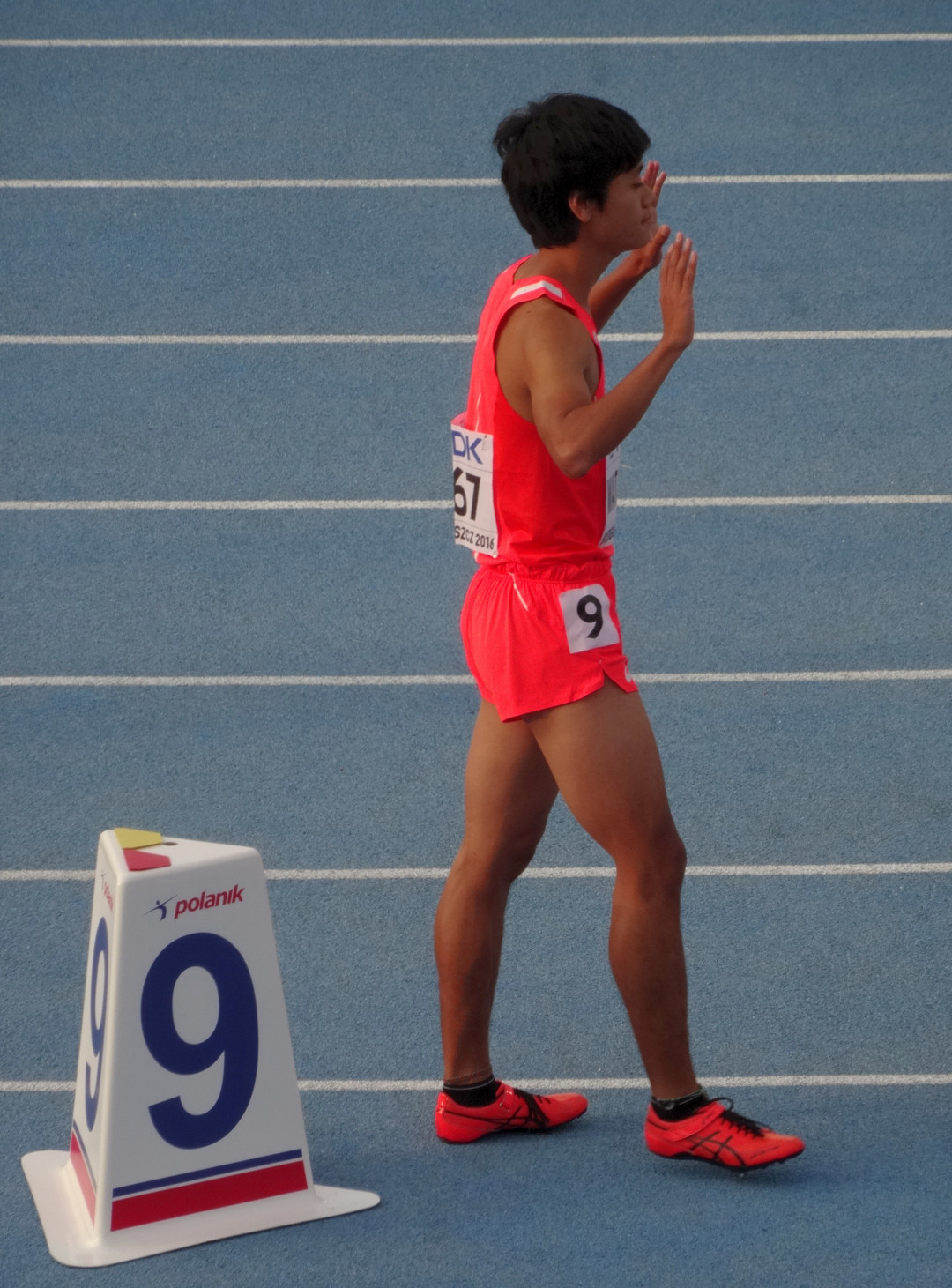
- Watanabe at the 2016 World U20 Championships

Personal information
- Nationality: Japanese
- Born: 7 January 1997 (age 29) Fukushima Prefecture, Japan
- Education: Josai University
- Height: 1.71 m (5 ft 7 in)
- Weight: 60 kg (130 lb)

Sport
- Country: Japan
- Sport: Track and field
- Event: 400 metres hurdles
- Club: Niigata Albirx Running Club

Achievements and titles
- Personal bests: 400 m: 46.35 (2017) 200 m hurdles: 22.55 AB (2017) 400 m hurdles: 49.43 (2017)
Medal record
Men's athletics
Representing Japan
Asian JuniorChampionships
Gold medal – first place	2016 Ho Chi Minh City	400 m hurdles

Yoshiro Watanabe (渡部 佳朗, Watanabe Yoshirō; born 7 January 1997, in Fukushima Prefecture) is a Japanese hurdler. He is the 2016 Asian junior champion in the 400 metres hurdles and has a personal best of 49.43 seconds. He also holds the Asian best performance of 22.55 seconds in the 200 metres hurdles. His time equaled world best performance in the event, but his time was not ratified.

== Personal bests ==
Event	Time (s)	Competition	Venue	Date	Notes
400 m	46.35	Fukushima Championships	Fukushima, Japan	15 July 2017	
200 m hurdles	22.55 (+1.4 m/s)	Japanese Record Trials	Itami, Japan	1 October 2017	AB
400 m hurdles	49.43	Japanese Championships	Osaka, Japan	23 June 2017	

== International competition ==
Year	Competition	Venue	Position	Event	Time
Representing Japan
2016	Asian Junior Championships	Ho Chi Minh City, Vietnam	1st	400 m hurdles	50.86
2016	World U20 Championships	Bydgoszcz, Poland	7th	400 m hurdles	51.09
2016	World U20 Championships	Bydgoszcz, Poland	4th	4×400 m relay	3:07.02 (relay leg: 3rd)

== National titles ==
Year	Competition	Venue	Event	Time (s)
Representing Josai University
2015	National Junior Championships	Nagoya, Aichi	400 m hurdles	49.97
2017	National University Championships	Fukui, Fukui	400 m hurdles	49.80
