= Kahmari Montgomery =

American sprinter (born 1997)

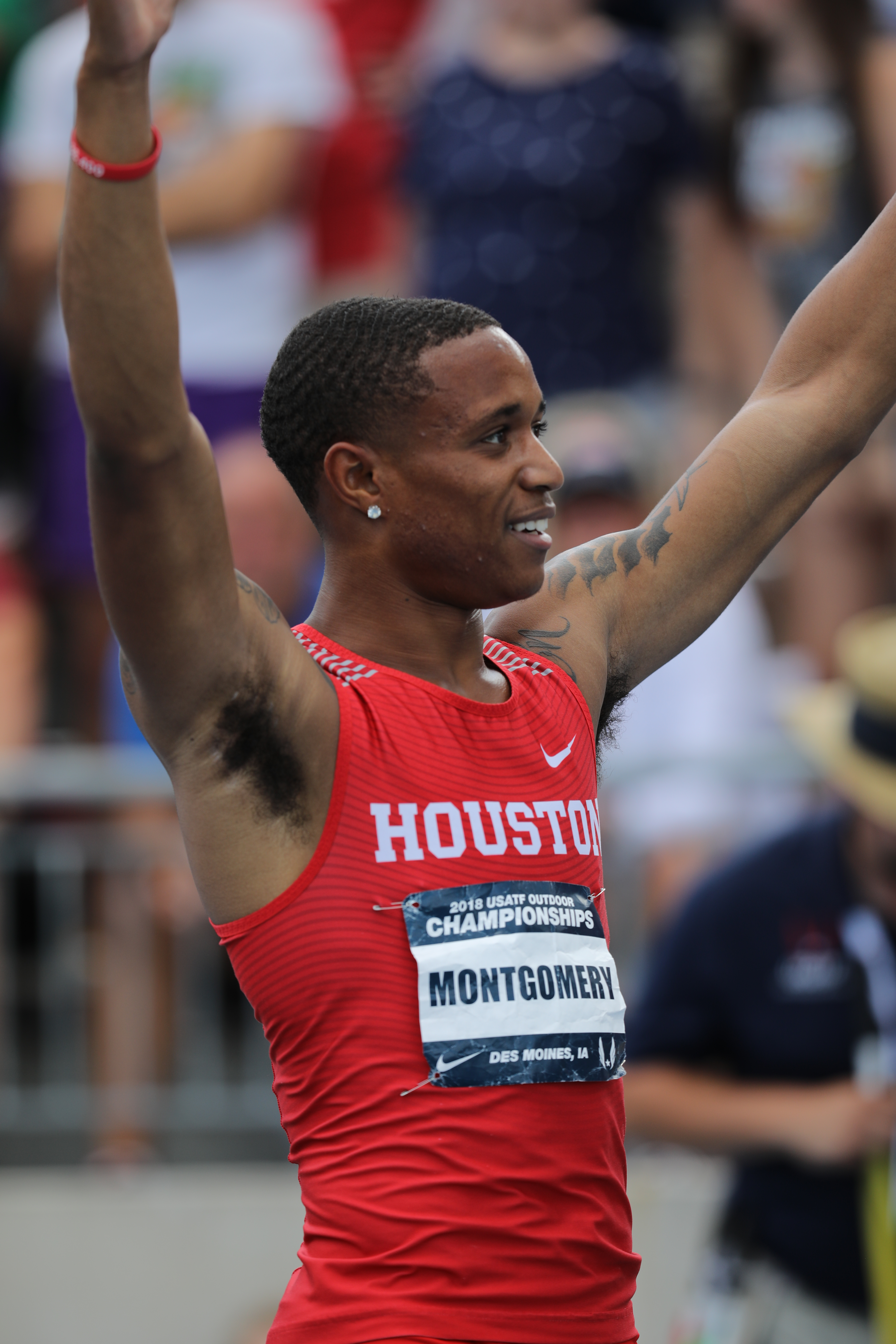
- Montgomery at the 2018 USA Championships

Personal information
- Born: August 16, 1997 (age 28) Plainfield, Illinois, US
- Height: 5 ft 10 in (178 cm)
- Weight: 142 lb (64 kg)

Sport
- Sport: Track and field
- Events: 400 m; 200 m; 4×400 m relay; 4×200 m relay
- College team: Houston Cougars (2018–2019); Missouri Tigers (2016–2017)
- Team: Nike
- Turned pro: 2019
- Coached by: Leroy Burrell and Carl Lewis

Achievements and titles
- Personal bests: 400 m: 44.23 (2019); 4×400 m relay split: 43.38 (2018); 200 m: 20.35 (2019)
Medal record
Men's track and field
Representing the United States
Athletics World Cup (Note: Not to be confused with the IAAF World Cup, now known as the Continental Cup.)
Gold medal – first place	2018 London	4×400 m relay
NACAC Championships
Gold medal – first place	2018 Toronto	4×400 m relay
Universiade
Silver medal – second place	2017 Taipei	4×400 m relay
World U20 Championships
Gold medal – first place	2016 Bydgoszcz	4×400 m relay

Kahmari Montgomery (born August 16, 1997) is an American track and field sprinter specializing in the 400 m for Nike. He was the men's 400 m champion at the USA Championships in 2018, and at the NCAA Division I Championships in 2019. He represented the United States in the 4 × 400 m relay at the World U20 Championships in 2016 and at the inaugural Athletics World Cup in 2018, earning gold medals in both competitions.

In early 2018 he ran a 43.38 s 4 × 400 m relay split, one of the fastest of all time, setting a school record and bringing the Houston Cougars to their first victory in the event at the Penn Relays. In February 2019 he ran a 44.45 s indoor split, the third-fastest indoor split of all time, to help the Houston Cougars to what is recognized as the world record for the indoor 4 × 400 m relay with a time of 3:01.51.

== Prep ==
Montgomery competed for Plainfield Central High School. He ran the fifth-fastest 400 m in the United States for high school seniors in 2015. He was also No. 12 for the indoor 60 m, No. 14 for the 100 m, and No. 17 for the 200 m. Montgomery won five Illinois High School Association state track championship titles: the 100 m state title in 2015, the 200 m in 2014 and 2015, and the 400 m in 2014 and 2015.

== College ==
As a freshman competing for the Missouri Tigers in 2016, Montgomery won the indoor 400 m in 45.78 s and outdoor 400 m in 45.13 s to become a two time Southeastern Conference (SEC) champion. He made the semi-finals at both the indoor and outdoor NCAA Division I Championships, placing 11th and 9th respectively in the 400 m, and earned a silver medal at the USA Junior Championships. He competed at the USA Olympic Trials in the 400 m, though he did not advance from the preliminaries. He finished his season by earning a gold medal for the United States at the World U20 Championships in the 4 × 400 m relay.

In his sophomore season he had less success. He failed to reach the finals in either of the SEC Championships, failed to qualify for either of the NCAA Division I Championships, and did not approach his personal best times he had set in the prior year. However he represented the United States at the Universiade where he was introduced to Leroy Burrell, head coach of the Houston Cougars, and earned a silver medal in the 4 × 400 m relay. He decided to transfer to the University of Houston after his season ended, citing a positive experience with the team at the Universiade and a lack of belief in his ability to succeed as an athlete at the University of Missouri.

In his first year competing for the Houston Cougars in 2018, Montgomery won the indoor 400 m in 45.53 s, indoor 4 × 400 m in 3:10.03, and outdoor 400 m in 45.93 s to become a three time American Athletic Conference (AAC) champion. At the Penn Relays he ran one of the fastest 4 × 400 m relay splits ever, clocking the anchor leg in 43.38 s and helping earn the Houston Cougars their first Penn Relays 4 × 400 m relay title in a new school record time of 3:01.82. He made the finals at both the indoor and outdoor NCAA Division I Championships, placing 4th and 7th respectively. In his last individual race for the season at the USA Championships he won the 400 m in a personal best time of 44.58 s. He went on to compete for the United States at the inaugural Athletics World Cup and the NACAC Championships, earning gold medals at both competitions in the 4 × 400 m relay.

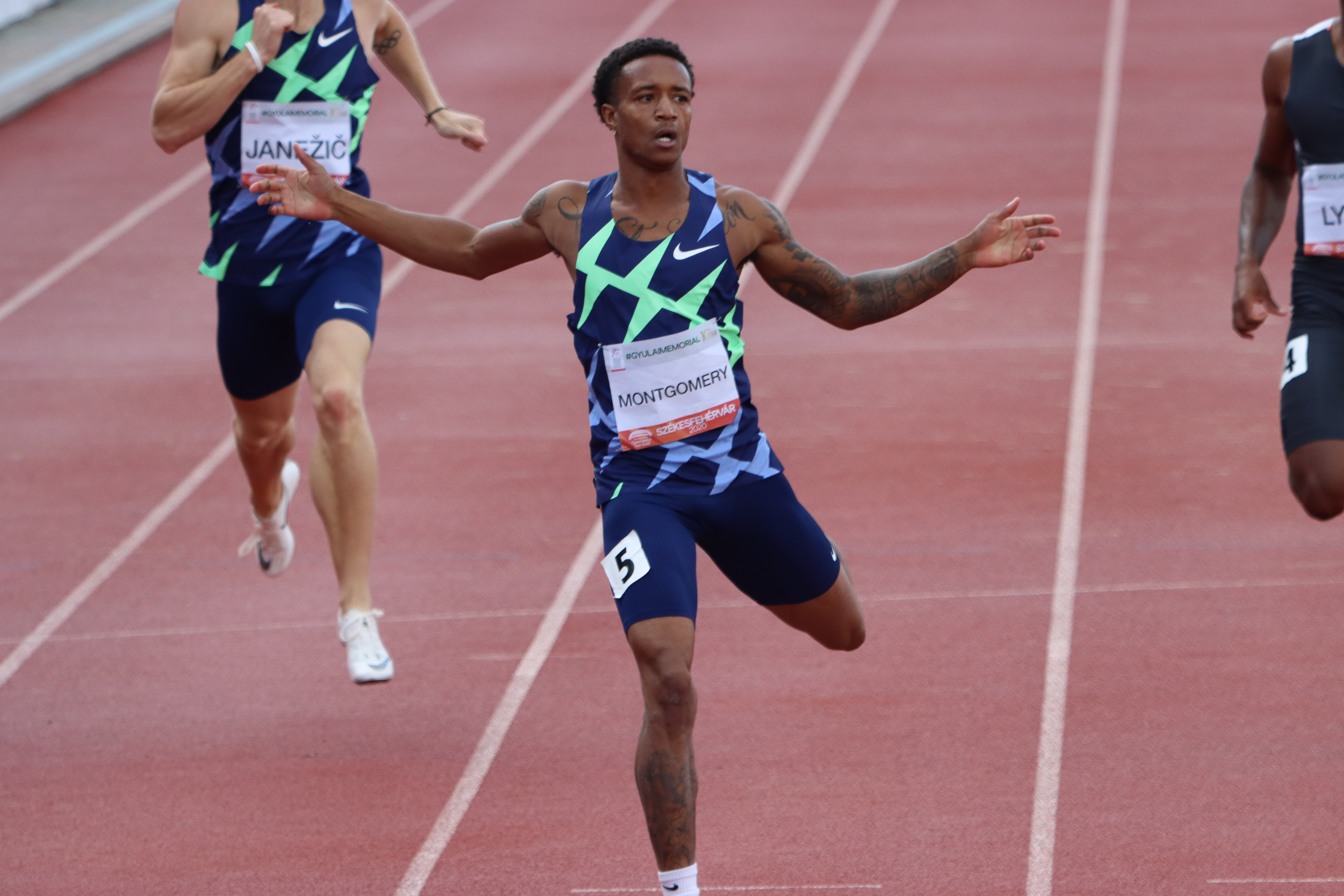
Kahmari Montgomery at the 2020 Gyulai Memorial in Szekesfehervar, Hungary

At the beginning of 2019, Montgomery was placed on the preseason watch list for The Bowerman. In February at the Clemson Tiger Paw Invitational he anchored Houston to victory in the 4 × 400 m relay with a world leading 3:01.51, the fourth fastest indoor performance of all time, and an indoor world record pending ratification. While not the fastest time achieved over the distance indoors, other faster times had not been ratified for various technical reasons. On February 26, 2020, Houston's indoor world record was ratified by World Athletics. Montgomery himself split 44.45 s, the third fastest indoor 400 m split of all time, to barely finish ahead of Texas A&M Aggie Devin Dixon, who recorded the fastest 400 m split of all time in 44.24 s. Two weeks later at the AAC Indoor Championships Montgomery repeated as 400 m champion with a world leading 45.04 s clocking. After the regional championships he was named co-athlete of the year by the United States Track & Field and Cross Country Coaches Association in the south-central region, shared with Devin Dixon. He wrapped up his indoor season with second place in the 400 m at the NCAA Division I Indoor Championships in 45.03 s, a new indoor personal best, and the 4 × 400 m relay title.

== Statistics ==
- Information from World Athletics profile unless otherwise noted.

=== Personal bests ===
Surface	Event	Time	Venue	Date	Notes
Outdoor	400 m	44.23	Austin, Texas, USA	June 7, 2019	
Outdoor	400 m (relay split)	43.38	Philadelphia, Pennsylvania, USA	April 28, 2018	
Outdoor	200 m	20.35	Sacramento, California, USA	May 25, 2018	(+1.6 m/s wind)
Outdoor	200 m	20.32 w	Wichita, Kansas, USA	May 12, 2019	(+2.4 m/s wind) wind-assisted
Outdoor	4×400 m relay	2:59.78	London, England	July 15, 2018	
Outdoor	4×200 m relay	1:20.94	Austin, Texas, USA	March 30, 2019	
Indoor	400 m	45.03	Birmingham, Alabama, USA	March 9, 2019	
Indoor	200 m	20.63	College Station, Texas, USA	February 2, 2019	
Indoor	4×400 m relay	3:01.51	Clemson, South Carolina, USA	February 9, 2019	Indoor WR, 44.45 s split (Note: Shared with Americans Amere Lattin, Obi Igbokwe, and Jermaine Holt for the Houston Cougars.)

=== International championships results ===
Year	Competition	Position	Event	Time	Venue	Notes
Representing the United States
2016	World U20 Championships	5th	400 m	46.48	Bydgoszcz, Poland	
2016	World U20 Championships	1st	4×400 m relay	3:02.39	Bydgoszcz, Poland	WU20L, PB
2017	Universiade	2nd	4×400 m relay	3:06.38	Taipei, Taiwan	
2018	Athletics World Cup	1st	4×400 m relay	2:59.78	London, England	PB
2018	NACAC Championships	1st	4×400 m relay	3:00.60	Toronto, Ontario, Canada	

=== Circuit wins ===
- Diamond League (400 m)
  - Doha: 2020

=== National championships results ===
Representing the Missouri Tigers (2016–2017), the Houston Cougars (2018–2019), and Nike (2019–2021)
Year	Competition	Position	Event	Time	Venue	Notes
2016	NCAA Division I Indoor Championships	11th	400 m	46.78	Birmingham, Alabama	
2016	NCAA Division I Championships	9th	400 m	45.81	Eugene, Oregon	
2016	USA Junior Championships	3rd (semis)	200 m	20.80	Clovis, California	(+0.8 m/s wind) Q, PB (Note: Qualified for the final, but did not run in the final.)
2016	USA Junior Championships	2nd	400 m	45.64	Clovis, California	
2016	USA Olympic Trials	26th	400 m	46.58	Eugene, Oregon	
2018	NCAA Division I Indoor Championships	4th	400 m	45.24	College Station, Texas	Indoor PB
2018	NCAA Division I Indoor Championships	13th	4×400 m relay	3:08.86	College Station, Texas	
2018	NCAA Division I Championships	7th	400 m	45.75	Eugene, Oregon	
2018	NCAA Division I Championships	5th	4×400 m relay	3:04.03	Eugene, Oregon	
2018	USA Championships	1st	400 m	44.58	Des Moines, Iowa	PB
2019	NCAA Division I Indoor Championships	2nd	400 m	45.03	Birmingham, Alabama	Indoor PB
2019	NCAA Division I Indoor Championships	1st	4×400 m relay	3:05.04	Birmingham, Alabama	
2019	NCAA Division I Championships	14th	200 m	20.49	Austin, Texas	(+0.6 m/s wind)
2019	NCAA Division I Championships	1st	400 m	44.23	Austin, Texas	PB
2019	NCAA Division I Championships	3rd	4×400 m relay	3:00.07	Austin, Texas	
2019	USA Championships	13th	400 m	45.91	Des Moines, Iowa	
2021	US Olympic Trials	17th	400 m	45.85	Eugene, Oregon	

- NCAA results from Track & Field Results Reporting System.

=== Seasonal bests ===
400 m
Year	Time	Venue	Notes
2014	46.82	Charleston, Illinois, USA	
2015	46.24	Charleston, Illinois, USA	
2016	45.13	Tuscaloosa, Alabama, USA	
2017	46.57	Fayetteville, Arkansas, USA	Indoor
2018	44.58	Des Moines, Iowa, USA	
2019	44.23	Austin, Texas, USA	
2020	45.50	Fehérvár, Hungary	
2021	45.39	Miramar, Florida, US	

200 m
Year	Time	Wind (m/s)	Venue	Notes
2013	22.18	NWI	Joliet, Illinois, USA	No wind information
2014	21.25	-0.2	Charleston, Illinois, USA	
2015	20.96	+1.8	Charleston, Illinois, USA	
2016	20.80	+0.8	Clovis, California, USA	
2017	21.21	—N/a	Nashville, Tennessee, USA	Indoor
2018	20.48	-0.4	Cincinnati, Ohio, USA	
2019	20.32 w	+2.4	Wichita, Kansas, USA	Wind-assisted
2019	20.35	+1.6	Sacramento, California, USA	
2020	21.32	—N/a	Houston, Texas, USA	Indoor
2020	20.86 w	+3.2	Prairie View, Texas, USA	Wind-assisted
2021	20.65	+1.4	Austin, Texas, USA	
