= 2016 IAAF World U20 Championships – Men's 110 metres hurdles =

The men's 110 metres hurdles event at the 2016 IAAF World U20 Championships was held at Zdzisław Krzyszkowiak Stadium on 20 and 21 July.

== Medalists ==
Gold	Marcus Krah; United States
Silver	Amere Lattin; United States
Bronze	Takumu Furuya; Japan

== Records ==
Standing records prior to the 2016 IAAF World U20 Championships in Athletics
World Junior Record	Wilhem Belocian (FRA)	12.99	Eugene, United States	24 July 2014
Championship Record	Wilhem Belocian (FRA)	12.99	Eugene, United States	24 July 2014
World Junior Leading	Marcus Krah (USA)	13.25	Clovis, United States	24 June 2016

== Results ==
=== Heats ===
Qualification: First 3 of each heat (Q) and the 3 fastest times (q) qualified for the semifinals.

Wind:
Heat 1: -0.8 m/s, Heat 2: -0.1 m/s, Heat 3: +0.7 m/s, Heat 4: -0.1 m/s, Heat 5: +0.4 m/s, Heat 6: +0.6 m/s, Heat 7: 0.0 m/s

Rank	Heat	Name	Nationality	Time	Note
1	6	Takumu Furuya	Japan	13.40	Q
2	4	Amere Lattin	United States	13.46	Q
3	7	Marcus Krah	United States	13.48	Q
4	6	Dawid Żebrowski	Poland	13.48	Q, PB
5	1	Damion Thomas	Jamaica	13.48	Q
6	5	Nicholas Andrews	Australia	13.56	Q
7	5	Joshuán Berrios	Colombia	13.56	Q, PB
8	7	Pap Demba Hiramatsu	Japan	13.59	Q, PB
9	4	Michael Nicholls	Barbados	13.62	Q, PB
10	2	Juan Pablo Germain	Chile	13.62	Q, NU20R
11	2	Mpho Tladi	South Africa	13.64	Q
12	6	James Weaver	Great Britain	13.65	Q
13	3	Amine Bouanani	Algeria	13.65	Q, NU20R
14	3	Matthew Treston	Great Britain	13.66	Q
15	7	Max Hrelja	Sweden	13.66	Q, NU20R
16	7	Rafael Henrique Pereira	Brazil	13.66	q
17	5	Bashiru Abdullahi	Nigeria	13.72	Q
18	3	Bálint Szeles	Hungary	13.72	Q, PB
19	3	Thabo Maganyele	South Africa	13.75	q
20	4	Dylan Caty	France	13.77	Q
21	6	Yoan Villa	Cuba	13.77	q
22	6	Mohammed Sad Al-Khfaji	Iraq	13.82	NU20R
23	2	De'Jour Russell	Jamaica	13.83	Q
24	2	Ilari Manninen	Finland	13.85	
25	3	Jacob McCorry	Australia	13.85	
26	6	Tavonte Mott	Bahamas	13.89	
27	4	Henrik Hannemann	Germany	13.89	
28	1	Joseph Daniels	Canada	13.89	Q
29	7	Zeng Jianhang	China	13.90	PB
30	5	Kim Gyeong-tae	South Korea	13.96	NU20R
31	7	Mohd Rizzua Muhammad	Malaysia	13.98	
32	3	Zhang Tao	China	13.98	
33	5	Marco Bigoni	Italy	14.00	
34	6	Nicola Cesca	Italy	14.03	
35	5	Shakeem Hall-Smith	Bahamas	14.03	Yellow card
36	2	Steven Marzán	Puerto Rico	14.04	PB
37	2	Maymon Poulose	India	14.10	
38	2	Cheung Wang Fung	Hong Kong	14.11	
39	7	Phanuwat Kwanyuen	Thailand	14.11	
40	1	Valtteri Kalliokulju	Finland	14.12	Q
41	4	Apisit Puanglamyai	Thailand	14.12	
42	1	David Sklenář	Czech Republic	14.15	
43	4	Jhon González	Colombia	14.17	
44	7	Bartosz Siudek	Poland	14.28	
45	1	Mathieu Jaquet	Switzerland	14.28	
46	4	Harun Akın	Turkey	14.32	
47	1	Alban Lefeuvre	France	14.37	
48	3	Martin Moldau	Estonia	14.43	
49	7	Ivan Khadatovich	Belarus	14.44	
50	5	Itamar Fayler	Israel	14.45	
51	4	Vyacheslav Zems	Kazakhstan	14.48	
52	1	Matúš Meluš	Slovakia	14.50	
53	1	Larry Steven Sulunga	Tonga	14.50	NU20R
54	2	Samuel Cedeño	Venezuela	14.68	
	5	Mikdat Sevler	Turkey	DNF	Yellow card
	3	Rokas Ickys	Lithuania	DQ	168.7(B)
	4	Akeem Chumney	Saint Kitts and Nevis	DQ	162.7
	6	Omon Precious Ojeikere	Nigeria	DNS	

=== Semifinals ===
Qualification: First 2 of each heat (Q) and the 2 fastest times (q) qualified for the final.

Wind:
Heat 1: +0.1 m/s, Heat 2: -0.1 m/s, Heat 3: +0.6 m/s

Rank	Heat	Name	Nationality	Time	Note
1	3	De'Jour Russell	Jamaica	13.20	Q
2	2	Marcus Krah	United States	13.36	Q
3	3	Amere Lattin	United States	13.39	Q
4	2	James Weaver	Great Britain	13.40	Q
5	1	Takumu Furuya	Japan	13.41	Q
6	3	Michael Nicholls	Barbados	13.42	q, PB
7	3	Dawid Żebrowski	Poland	13.53	q
8	3	Bashiru Abdullahi	Nigeria	13.58	
9	2	Max Hrelja	Sweden	13.61	NU20R
10	3	Nicholas Andrews	Australia	13.68	
11	1	Matthew Treston	Great Britain	13.70	Q
12	1	Juan Pablo Germain	Chile	13.72	
13	2	Joshuán Berrios	Colombia	13.74	
14	1	Dylan Caty	France	13.74	
15	1	Amine Bouanani	Algeria	13.78	
16	1	Mpho Tladi	South Africa	13.80	
17	1	Yoan Villa	Cuba	13.81	
18	2	Rafael Henrique Pereira	Brazil	13.85	
19	2	Valtteri Kalliokulju	Finland	13.90	
20	1	Bálint Szeles	Hungary	14.09	
21	2	Pap Demba Hiramatsu	Japan	19.52	
	2	Damion Thomas	Jamaica	DNF	
	3	Joseph Daniels	Canada	DNF	
	3	Thabo Maganyele	South Africa	DQ	R145.2

=== Final ===
Wind: +0.2 m/s

Rank	Lane	Name	Nationality	Time	Note
1st place, gold medalist(s)	6	Marcus Krah	United States	13.25	PB
2nd place, silver medalist(s)	4	Amere Lattin	United States	13.30	
3rd place, bronze medalist(s)	7	Takumu Furuya	Japan	13.31	AU20R
4	5	De'Jour Russell	Jamaica	13.39	
5	3	Dawid Żebrowski	Poland	13.45	PB
6	2	Michael Nicholls	Barbados	13.45	
7	9	James Weaver	Great Britain	13.51	
8	9	Matthew Treston	Great Britain	13.55	
