= Athletics at the 2019 Summer Universiade – Men's 110 metres hurdles =

The men's 110 metres hurdles event at the 2019 Summer Universiade was held on 11 and 12 July at the Stadio San Paolo in Naples.

== Medalists ==
Gold	Silver	Bronze
Gabriel Constantino; Brazil	Wilhem Belocian; France	Shunsuke Izumiya; Japan

== Results ==
=== Heats ===
Qualification: First 3 in each heat (Q) and next 4 fastest (q) qualified for the semifinals.

Wind:
Heat 1: +0.3 m/s, Heat 2: -0.9 m/s, Heat 3: -1.3 m/s, Heat 4: -1.3 m/s

Rank	Heat	Name	Nationality	Time	Notes
1	3	Wilhem Belocian	France	13.57	Q
2	4	Gabriel Constantino	Brazil	13.58	Q
3	4	Shunsuke Izumiya	Japan	13.64	Q
4	1	Lorenzo Perini	Italy	13.65	Q
5	1	Valdó Szűcs	Hungary	13.71	Q
6	4	David Yefremov	Kazakhstan	13.71	Q, PB
7	1	Nicholas Andrews	Australia	13.76	Q, PB
8	3	Joey Daniels	Canada	13.80	Q
9	4	Khai Riley-Laborde	Great Britain	13.80	q
10	2	Yang Wei-ting	Chinese Taipei	13.87	Q
11	2	Paulo Henrique da Silva	Brazil	13.89	Q
12	4	Kim Gyeong-tae	South Korea	13.97	q, PB
13	2	Ludovic Payen	France	14.06	Q
14	3	Joshua Hawkins	New Zealand	14.09	Q
15	1	Shane Moffo	Canada	14.09	q
16	2	Jacob McCorry	Australia	14.10	q
17	4	Cosmin Ilie Dumitrache	Romania	14.14	
18	1	Job Beintema	Netherlands	14.22	
19	3	Tiaan Kleynhans	South Africa	14.25	
20	2	Miguel Perera	Great Britain	14.32	
21	3	Matthew Behan	Ireland	14.45	
22	2	Vyacheslav Zems	Kazakhstan	14.47	SB
23	1	Rapolas Saulius	Lithuania	14.49	
24	2	Roshan Ranatungage	Sri Lanka	14.54	
25	3	Cheang Chan Fai	Macau	15.32	
26	3	Franco Mavolo	Argentina	15.49	
	4	Hassan Al-Jumah	Saudi Arabia	DNF	

=== Semifinals ===
Qualification: First 3 in each heat (Q) and next 2 fastest (q) qualified for the final.

Wind:
Heat 1: -0.2 m/s, Heat 2: -0.6 m/s

Rank	Heat	Name	Nationality	Time	Notes
1	1	Gabriel Constantino	Brazil	13.39	Q
2	1	Lorenzo Perini	Italy	13.46	Q, PB
3	2	Wilhem Belocian	France	13.47	Q
4	2	Shunsuke Izumiya	Japan	13.59	Q
5	1	Ludovic Payen	France	13.71	Q
6	2	Paulo Henrique da Silva	Brazil	13.76	Q
7	2	Yang Wei-ting	Chinese Taipei	13.84	q
8	1	Valdó Szűcs	Hungary	13.85	q
9	1	Nicholas Andrews	Australia	13.86	
10	2	Joshua Hawkins	New Zealand	13.92	SB
11	2	Jacob McCorry	Australia	13.93	
12	1	Khai Riley-Laborde	Great Britain	13.94	
13	1	Kim Gyeong-tae	South Korea	13.94	PB
14	1	Joey Daniels	Canada	14.15	
15	2	Shane Moffo	Canada	27.40	
	2	David Yefremov	Kazakhstan	DNF	

=== Final ===
Official Video

Wind: +0.1 m/s

Rank	Lane	Name	Nationality	Time	Notes
1st place, gold medalist(s)	4	Gabriel Constantino	Brazil	13.22	
2nd place, silver medalist(s)	6	Wilhem Belocian	France	13.30	SB
3rd place, bronze medalist(s)	3	Shunsuke Izumiya	Japan	13.49	
4	5	Lorenzo Perini	Italy	13.50	
5	7	Ludovic Payen	France	13.57	
6	1	Yang Wei-ting	Chinese Taipei	13.69	SB
7	8	Paulo Henrique da Silva	Brazil	13.76	
8	2	Valdó Szűcs	Hungary	13.77	
