= Amere Lattin =

American hurdler

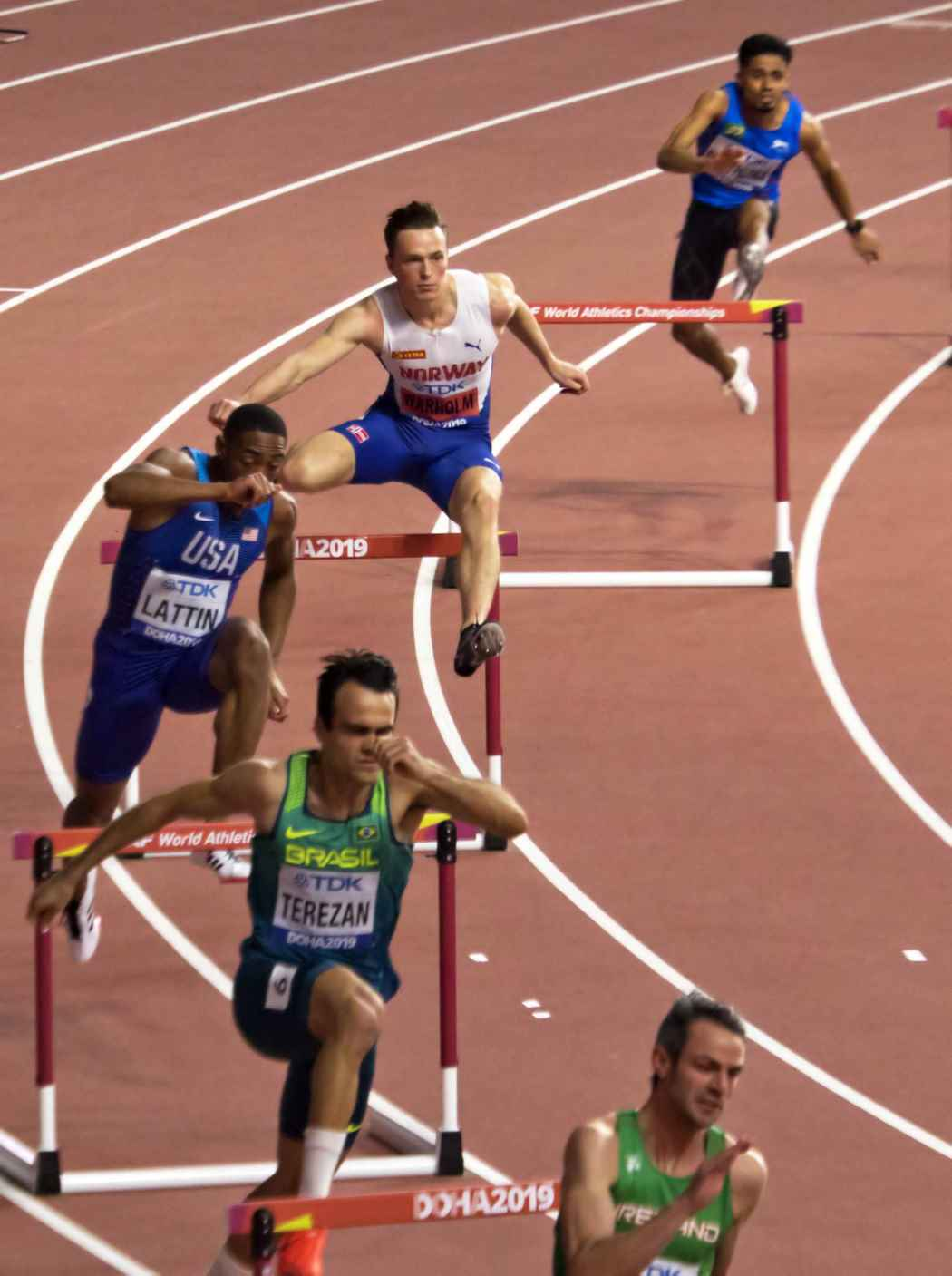

Personal information
- Born: July 12, 1997 (age 29) Brookhaven, Mississippi, U.S.

Sport
- Sport: Track and field
- Events: Hurdles and sprints
- College team: Houston Cougars
- Team: Nike
- Turned pro: 2019
- Coached by: Leroy Burrell

Achievements and titles
- Personal bests: 400 m hurdles: 48.66 (Des Moines, 2019); 110 m hurdles: 13.44 (Austin, 2019); 60 m hurdles: 7.71 (Lubbock, 2019)
Medal record
Men's athletics
Representing the United States
Pan American Games
Silver medal – second place	2019 Lima	400 m hurdles
Universiade
Silver medal – second place	2017 Taipei	4×400 m relay
World U20 Championships
Silver medal – second place	2016 Bydgoszcz	110 m hurdles

Amere Lattin (born July 12, 1997) is an American track and field athlete who specializes in the hurdles, mostly 400-meter hurdles. He was the silver medalist at the 2019 Pan American Games, running 48.98 in the 400 m hurdles final.

He made his international debut in age category competitions: he was a 110-meter hurdles finalist at 2014 Summer Youth Olympics and finished as runner-up in the 110 m hurdles at the 2016 IAAF World U20 Championships. He has also competed in sprinting, sharing in the 4 × 400-meter relay silver medal with the American team at the 2017 Summer Universiade.

He finished third at 2019 USA Championships and qualified for 2019 World Championships in Doha, with a personal best of 48.66.

Running for the University of Houston he ran the first leg on what is recognized as the world record in the 4 × 400 meters relay, the team running a time of 3:01.51.

== Statistics ==
Information from World Athletics profile or Track & Field Results Reporting System unless otherwise noted.

=== Personal bests ===
- w = wind-assisted (more than +2.0 m/s wind)
- WR = world record (recognized by World Athletics)

Event	Time (s)	Venue	Date	Notes
400 m hurdles	48.66	Des Moines, Iowa, U.S.	July 27, 2019	
110 m hurdles	13.44	Austin, Texas, U.S.	June 5, 2019	+2.0 m/s wind
110 m hurdles	13.40 w	Austin, Texas, U.S.	March 30, 2019	Wind-assisted, +4.7 m/s wind
60 m hurdles	7.71	Lubbock, Texas, U.S.	January 18, 2019	
4×400 m relay	3:00.07	Austin, Texas, U.S.	June 7, 2019	
4×400 m relay indoor	3:01.51	Clemson, South Carolina, U.S.	February 9, 2019	Indoor WR (Note: Shared with Americans Obi Igbokwe, Jermaine Holt, and Kahmari Montgomery for the Houston Cougars.)

=== Seasonal bests ===
View chart definition.

=== International competitions ===
Year	Competition	Venue	Position	Event	Notes
2014	Youth Olympics	Nanjing, China	7th	110 m hurdles	
2016	World U20 Championships	Bydgoszcz, Poland	2nd	110 m hurdles	
2017	Universiade	Taipei, Taiwan	DQ (semi 2)	110 m hurdles	
2017	Universiade	Taipei, Taiwan	2nd	4 × 400 m relay	
2019	Pan American Games	Lima, Peru	2nd	400 m hurdles	
2019	World Championships	Doha, Qatar	14th	400 m hurdles	
2022	World Indoor Championships	Belgrade, Serbia	8th (h)	4 × 400 m relay	3:09.11
