= 2019 European Athletics U23 Championships – Men's 110 metres hurdles =

The men's 110 metres hurdles event at the 2019 European Athletics U23 Championships was held in Gävle, Sweden, at Gavlehof Stadium Park on 11 and 12 July.

== Medalists ==
| Gold | Silver | Bronze |
|---|---|---|
| Jason Joseph; Switzerland | Michał Sierocki; Poland | Cameron Fillery; Great Britain |

== Results ==
=== Heats ===
11 July
Qualification: First 4 in each heat (Q) and next 4 fastest (q) qualified for the semifinals.

Wind:
Heat 1: -1.9 m/s, Heat 2: -1.9 m/s, Heat 3: -2.5 m/s, Heat 4: -1.7 m/s, Heat 5: -2.8 m/s

| Rank | Heat | Name | Nationality | Time | Notes |
|---|---|---|---|---|---|
| 1 | 2 | Jason Joseph | Switzerland | 13.82 | Q |
| 2 | 4 | Cameron Fillery | Great Britain | 14.05 | Q |
| 3 | 5 | Artem Makarenko | Authorised Neutral Athletes | 14.07 | Q |
| 4 | 1 | Michał Sierocki | Poland | 14.13 | Q |
| 5 | 3 | Michael Obasuyi | Belgium | 14.15 | Q |
| 6 | 5 | Tade Ojora | Great Britain | 14.15 | Q |
| 7 | 2 | Dawid Żebrowski | Poland | 14.20 | Q |
| 8 | 3 | James Weaver | Great Britain | 14.21 | Q |
| 9 | 1 | Max Hrelja | Sweden | 14.22 | Q |
| 10 | 4 | David Ryba | Czech Republic | 14.26 | Q |
| 11 | 4 | Mikdat Sevler | Turkey | 14.27 | Q |
| 12 | 1 | Viktor Solyanov | Ukraine | 14.32 | Q |
| 13 | 3 | Just Kwaou-Mathey | France | 14.37 | Q |
| 14 | 2 | Romain Lecoeur | France | 14.37 | Q |
| 15 | 5 | Chituru Ali | Italy | 14.43 | Q |
| 16 | 1 | Johannes Treiel | Estonia | 14.46 | Q |
| 17 | 5 | Oleksiy Ovcharenko | Ukraine | 14.48 | Q |
| 18 | 3 | Joel Bengtsson | Sweden | 14.50 | Q |
| 19 | 5 | Paulo Neto | Portugal | 14.52 | q |
| 20 | 3 | Bálint Szeles | Hungary | 14.53 | q |
| 21 | 1 | Valtteri Kalliokulju | Finland | 14.53 | q |
| 22 | 2 | Dániel Eszes | Hungary | 14.58 | Q |
| 23 | 5 | Ilari Manninen | Finland | 14.60 | q |
| 24 | 4 | Viktar Sinkavets | Belarus | 14.62 | q |
| 25 | 4 | Mathieu Jaquet | Switzerland | 14.66 | |
| 26 | 4 | Gabriele Crnigoj | Italy | 14.67 | |
| 27 | 3 | Edson Gomes | Portugal | 14.69 | |
| 28 | 3 | Harun Akın | Turkey | 14.95 | |
| 29 | 2 | Furkan Aktaş | Turkey | 14.98 | |
| 30 | 2 | Anastasios Vasileiou | Cyprus | 15.15 | |
| 31 | 1 | Radu Ovidiu Costache | Romania | 15.60 | |
| | 1 | Mattia Montini | Italy | DNF | |
| | 2 | Jan Kisiala | Czech Republic | DNF | |

=== Semifinals ===
12 July
Qualification: First 2 in each heat (Q) and next 2 fastest (q) qualified for the final.

Wind:
Heat 1: +1.1 m/s, Heat 2: 0.0 m/s, Heat 3: +0.7 m/s

| Rank | Heat | Name | Nationality | Time | Notes |
|---|---|---|---|---|---|
| 1 | 1 | Jason Joseph | Switzerland | 13.54 | Q |
| 2 | 3 | Artem Makarenko | Authorised Neutral Athletes | 13.57 | Q, PB |
| 3 | 2 | Cameron Fillery | Great Britain | 13.60 | Q, PB |
| 4 | 2 | Michael Obasuyi | Belgium | 13.65 | Q |
| 5 | 1 | Dawid Żebrowski | Poland | 13.69 | Q, PB |
| 6 | 3 | Michał Sierocki | Poland | 13.81 | Q |
| 7 | 2 | Max Hrelja | Sweden | 13.85 | q |
| 8 | 3 | James Weaver | Great Britain | 13.90 | q |
| 9 | 3 | Chituru Ali | Italy | 13.95 | |
| 10 | 2 | Romain Lecoeur | France | 13.96 | |
| 11 | 1 | Just Kwaou-Mathey | France | 13.97 | |
| 12 | 2 | Mikdat Sevler | Turkey | 14.02 | |
| 13 | 1 | Viktor Solyanov | Ukraine | 14.14 | |
| 14 | 2 | Oleksiy Ovcharenko | Ukraine | 14.16 | PB |
| 15 | 2 | Valtteri Kalliokulju | Finland | 14.16 | |
| 16 | 3 | Paulo Neto | Portugal | 14.21 | PB |
| 17 | 1 | Joel Bengtsson | Sweden | 14.40 | |
| 18 | 3 | Bálint Szeles | Hungary | 14.40 | |
| 19 | 2 | Viktar Sinkavets | Belarus | 14.44 | |
| 20 | 3 | David Ryba | Czech Republic | 14.46 | |
| 21 | 1 | Ilari Manninen | Finland | 14.81 | |
| 22 | 1 | Dániel Eszes | Hungary | 28.54 | |
| | 1 | Tade Ojora | Great Britain | DQ | R168.7(a) |
| | 3 | Johannes Treiel | Estonia | DQ | R168.7(a) |

=== Final ===
12 July

Wind: +1.4 m/s

| Rank | Lane | Name | Nationality | Time | Notes |
|---|---|---|---|---|---|
| 1st place, gold medalist(s) | 3 | Jason Joseph | Switzerland | 13.45 | |
| 2nd place, silver medalist(s) | 7 | Michał Sierocki | Poland | 13.63 | PB |
| 3rd place, bronze medalist(s) | 6 | Cameron Fillery | Great Britain | 13.64 | |
| 4 | 4 | Artem Makarenko | Authorised Neutral Athletes | 13.65 | |
| 5 | 5 | Michael Obasuyi | Belgium | 13.67 | |
| 6 | 8 | Dawid Żebrowski | Poland | 13.90 | |
| 7 | 1 | James Weaver | Great Britain | 13.92 | |
| 8 | 2 | Max Hrelja | Sweden | 13.98 | |
