= Ludovic Payen =

French hurdler

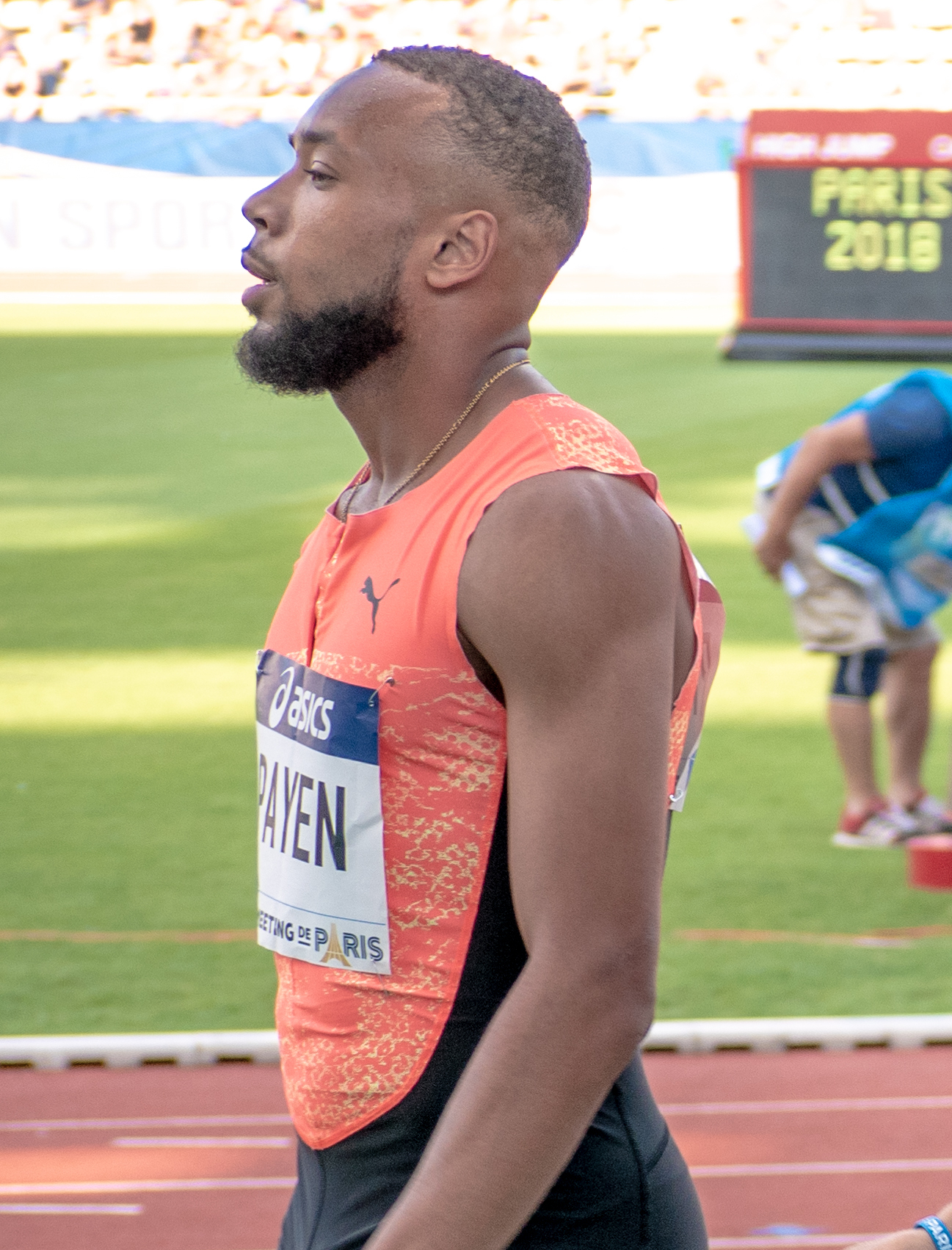
- Ludovic Payen in 2018

Personal information
- Born: 18 February 1995 (age 30) Vernon, France
- Education: University of Poitiers
- Height: 1.85 m (6 ft 1 in)
- Weight: 80 kg (176 lb)

Sport
- Sport: Athletics
- Event(s): 110 m hurdles, 60 m hurdles
- Club: Bordeaux Athle

Ludovic Payen (born 18 February 1995 in Vernon) is a French athlete specialising in the high hurdles. He won a gold medal at the 2017 European U23 Championships.

His personal bests are 13.38 seconds in the 110 metres hurdles (+1.1 m/s, Bonneuil-sur-Marne 2018) and 7.66 seconds in the 60 metres hurdles (Liévin 2018).

== International competitions ==
| Year | Competition | Venue | Position | Event | Notes |
Representing France
| 2017 | European U23 Championships | Bydgoszcz, Poland | 1st | 110 m hurdles | 13.49 |
| 2019 | Universiade | Naples, Italy | 5th | 110 m hurdles | 13.57 |
