= 2016 IAAF World U20 Championships – Men's 4 × 400 metres relay =

The men's 4 × 100 metres relay event at the 2016 IAAF World U20 Championships was held at Zdzisław Krzyszkowiak Stadium on 23 and 24 July.

== Medalists ==
Gold	Silver	Bronze
United States; Champion Allison; Ari Cogdell; Kahmari Montgomery; Wilbert London III	Botswana; Omphemetse Poo; Baboloki Thebe; Karabo Sibanda; Xholani Talane	Jamaica; Anthony Carpenter; Sean Bailey; Terry Ricardo Thomas; Christopher Taylor; Aykeeme Francis*

*Athletes who competed in heats only

== Records ==
World Junior Record	United States	3:01.09	Grosseto, Italy	18 July 2004
Championship Record	United States	3:01.09	Grosseto, Italy	18 July 2004
World Junior Leading	Germany	3:08.52	Mannheim, Germany	26 June 2016

== Results ==
=== Heats ===
Qualification: First 3 of each heat (Q) plus the 2 fastest times (q) qualified for the final.

Rank	Heat	Nation	Athletes	Time	Notes
1	1	Botswana	Omphemetse Poo, Baboloki Thebe, Karabo Sibanda, Xholani Talane	3:03.75	Q, WU20L
2	1	Japan	Kazuki Matsukiyo, Naoki Kitadani, Yoshiro Watanabe, Mizuki Obuchi	3:07.59	Q, SB
3	2	United States	Champion Allison, Ari Cogdell, Kahmari Montgomery, Wilbert London III	3:07.87	Q, SB
4	2	Germany	Manuel Sanders, Julian Wagner, Fabian Dammermann, Marvin Schlegel	3:08.50	Q, SB
5	1	Jamaica	Anthony Carpenter, Sean Bailey, Aykeeme Francis, Terry Ricardo Thomas	3:08.80	Q, SB
6	1	India	Kiran Murugan, Harsh Kumar, Pankaj Pankaj, Amoj Jacob	3:08.89	q, NU20R
7	1	Trinidad and Tobago	Joshua St. Clair, Dwight St Hilare, Judah Taylor, Kashief King	3:08.91	q, SB
8	2	Italy	Umberto Mezzaluna, Vladimir Aceti, Brayan Lopez, Alessandro Sibilio	3:09.42	Q, SB
9	1	Poland	Mateusz Rzeźniczak, Cezary Mirosław, Kamil Mroczek, Tymoteusz Zimny	3:09.42	SB
10	1	Thailand	Nattapong Kongkraphan, Witthawat Thumcha, Phitchaya Sunthonthuam, Vitsanu Phosri	3:10.08	
11	2	Belgium	Alexander Doom, Julian Cobbaert, Dylan Owusu, Gerbrand Huts	3:10.78	SB
12	2	Latvia	Ilja Petrušenko, Austris Karpinskis, Valerijs Valinšcikovs, Maksims Sinčukovs	3:10.85	NU20R
13	1	Canada	Nathaniel Mechler, Michael Petersen, Callum MacNab, Nathan Friginette	3:12.05	SB
	2	Saudi Arabia	Sultan Hussain Khalufi, Sabir Said Essa, Saeed Hassan Olwani, Ahmed Saleh Mahda	DQ	163.3(a)
	2	Kenya		DNS	

=== Final ===
Rank	Nation	Athletes	Time	Notes
1st place, gold medalist(s)	United States	Champion Allison, Ari Cogdell, Kahmari Montgomery, Wilbert London III	3:02.39	WU20L
2nd place, silver medalist(s)	Botswana	Omphemetse Poo, Baboloki Thebe, Karabo Sibanda, Xholani Talane	3:02.81	AU20L
3rd place, bronze medalist(s)	Jamaica	Anthony Carpenter, Sean Bailey, Terry Ricardo Thomas, Christopher Taylor	3:04.83	SB
4	Japan	Mizuki Obuchi, Naoki Kitadani, Yoshiro Watanabe, Kazuki Matsukiyo	3:07.02	
5	Germany	Manuel Sanders, Julian Wagner, Fabian Dammermann, Marvin Schlegel	3:08.13	SB
6	Trinidad and Tobago	Joshua St. Clair, Dwight St Hilare, Judah Taylor, Kashief King	3:08.28	SB
7	India	Kiran Murugan, Santhosh Tamilarasan, Pankaj Pankaj, Amoj Jacob	3:09.14	
	Italy	Umberto Mezzaluna, Vladimir Aceti, Brayan Lopez, Alessandro Sibilio	DQ	R163.3(a)
