= 2017 European Athletics U23 Championships – Men's 110 metres hurdles =

The men's 110 metres hurdles event at the 2017 European Athletics U23 Championships was held in Bydgoszcz, Poland, at Zdzisław Krzyszkowiak Stadium on 14 and 15 July.

== Medalists ==
Gold	Ludovic Payen; France
Silver	Khai Riley-Laborde; Great Britain
Bronze	Dylan Caty; France

== Results ==
=== Heats ===
14 July

Qualification rule: First 2 (Q) and the next 2 fastest (q) qualified for the final.

Wind:
Heat 1: -0.7 m/s, Heat 2: -0.5 m/s, Heat 3: +0.9 m/s

Rank	Heat	Name	Nationality	Time	Notes
1	2	Ludovic Payen	France	13.72	Q
2	3	James Weaver	Great Britain	13.85	Q
3	2	Simone Poccia	Italy	13.89	Q, PB
4	3	Dylan Caty	France	13.96	Q
5	1	Khai Riley-Laborde	Great Britain	14.01	Q
6	3	Kacper Schubert	Poland	14.07	q
7	2	Dawid Żebrowski	Poland	14.11	q
8	3	Francesco Ferrante	Italy	14.12	
9	3	Bohdan Chornomaz	Ukraine	14.12	
10	1	David Sklenář	Czech Republic	14.14	Q
11	1	Matthew Behnan	Ireland	14.14	PB
12	1	Rapolas Saulius	Lithuania	14.20	
13	2	Antonio García	Spain	14.21	
14	1	Marcin Grudka	Poland	14.23	
15	3	Arseni Zdanevich	Belarus	14.26	
16	1	Florian Domenig	Austria	14.47	
17	2	Maksat Kandymov	Ukraine	14.52	
18	1	Gerard Porras	Spain	14.55	
19	3	Adrian Boldeanu	Romania	14.58	
20	3	Martynas Vrašinskas	Lithuania	14.61	
21	2	Daniel Špičák	Czech Republic	14.64	
	2	Viktor Kantele	Finland	DQ	R162.7

=== Final ===
15 July

Wind: +0.8 m/s

Rank	Lane	Name	Nationality	Time	Notes
1st place, gold medalist(s)	5	Ludovic Payen	France	13.49	PB
2nd place, silver medalist(s)	4	Khai Riley-Laborde	Great Britain	13.65	
3rd place, bronze medalist(s)	8	Dylan Caty	France	13.66	PB
4	7	James Weaver	Great Britain	13.75	PB
5	2	Dawid Żebrowski	Poland	13.90	=PB
6	6	Simone Poccia	Italy	13.92	
7	9	David Sklenář	Czech Republic	14.19	
8	3	Kacper Schubert	Poland	14.21	
