= Jaheel Hyde =

Jamaican athlete (born 1997)

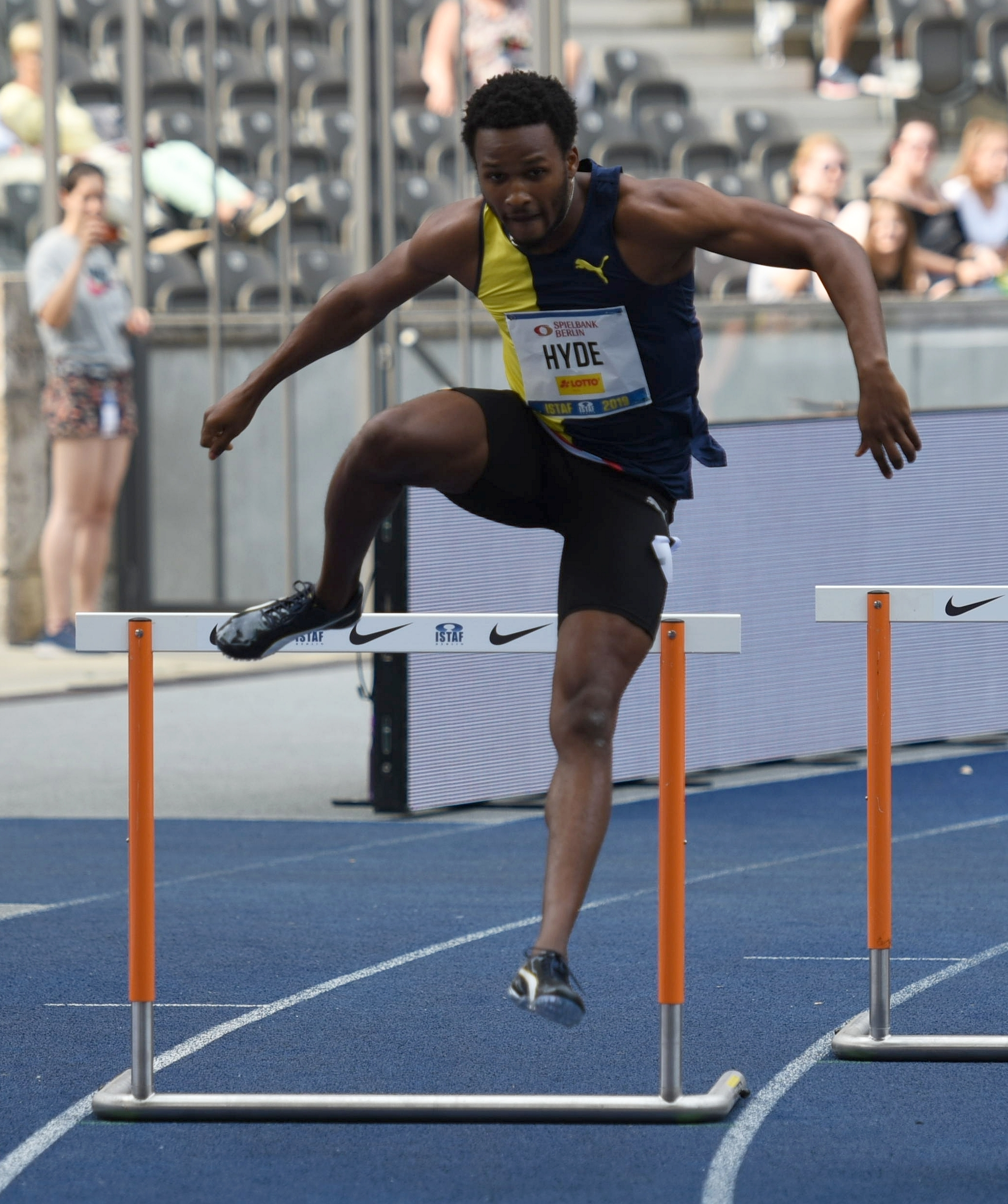
- Jaheel Hyde in 2019

Personal information
- Nationality: Jamaica
- Born: 2 February 1997 (age 29) Spanish Town, Jamaica
- Education: University of the West Indies, Mona
- Height: 1.80 m (5 ft 11 in)
- Weight: 74 kg (163 lb)

Sport
- Sport: Track and field, football
- Events: 110 m hurdles, 400 m hurdles
- Club: Cameron Blazers
- Coached by: Bert Cameron

Achievements and titles
- Personal bests: 110 m hurdles (91.4cm): 12.96 (WYB, Nanjing 2014); 110 m hurdles (99.0cm): 13.22; 400 m hurdles: 48.03
Medal record
Men's athletics
Representing Jamaica
Pan American Games
Gold medal – first place	2023 Santiago	400 m hurdles
Commonwealth Games
Silver medal – second place	2022 Birmingham	400m hurdles
Bronze medal – third place	2018 Gold Coast	400m hurdles
World Junior Championships
Gold medal – first place	2014 Oregon	400 m hurdles
Gold medal – first place	2016 Bydgoszcz	400 m hurdles
Bronze medal – third place	2014 Oregon	4×400 m relay
Summer Youth Olympics
Gold medal – first place	2014 Nanjing	110 m hurdles
World Youth Championships
Gold medal – first place	2013 Donetsk	110 m hurdles
Gold medal – first place	Donetsk 2013	Medley relay
CARIFTA Games (Youth)
Gold medal – first place	2012 Hamilton	110 m hurdles
Gold medal – first place	2013 Nassau	4 × 100 m relay
Bronze medal – third place	2013 Nassau	200 m
Bronze medal – third place	2013 Nassau	4 × 400 m relay
Gold medal – first place	2014 Fort-de-France	110 m hurdles
Gold medal – first place	2014 Fort-de-France	400 m hurdles
Gold medal – first place	2014 Fort-de-France	4×400 m relay
CARIFTA Games (Junior)
Gold medal – first place	2015 Basseterre	110 m hurdles
Gold medal – first place	2015 Basseterre	400 m hurdles
Gold medal – first place	2015 Basseterre	4 × 400 m relay

Jaheel Hyde (born 2 February 1997) is a Jamaican track and field athlete. He was the 2014 world junior champion in the 400 metres hurdles and the 2013 world youth champion in the 110 metres hurdles.

He won a gold medal in the 110 m hurdles at the 2013 World Youth Championships in Athletics in Donetsk, Ukraine, setting a new championship record for the event and coming .01 seconds shy of tying the World Youth Best held by Wilhem Belocian. In 2014, he won the gold medal in the 400 metres hurdles at the World Junior Championships in Eugene, Oregon, then the 100 metres hurdles at the Youth Olympics in Nanjing, China, beating Belocian's World Youth Best with a time of 12.96 seconds.

His parents, Lenworth Hyde and Angela Hussett, encouraged their children to participate in sport. His father was an international footballer for Jamaica for over ten years. His older brothers have also been involved in sport: Lenworth Jr. and Jamie both played football for Jamaica at age category level while Julian Hyde won international medals in equestrian sports. Hyde has also played for the Jamaican football team and scored a hat-trick against Bermuda in an under-17s international match in 2012. In January 2024, Hyde attended open tryouts for USL Championship club Hartford Athletic and was selected to join the team for preseason training.

== Personal bests ==
Event	Result	Venue	Date
200 m	20.78 s (wind: +0.5 m/s)	(Jamaica) Kingston	3 Sep 2017
400 m	45.78 s	(Jamaica) Kingston	26 Mar 2022
110 m hurdles (99 cm)	13.22 s (wind: +0.1 m/s)	(Jamaica) Kingston	8 Mar 2015
110 m hurdles (91 cm)	12.96 s (wind: +1.3 m/s)	(China) Nanjing	23 Aug 2014
400 m hurdles	48.03 s	(United States) Eugene	19 July 2022

== Competition record ==
Year	Competition	Venue	Position	Event	Notes
Representing Jamaica
2012	CARIFTA Games (U17)	Hamilton, Bermuda	1st	110m hurdles (91 cm)	13.96 (wind: +0.8 m/s)
2013	CARIFTA Games (U17)	Nassau, Bahamas	3rd	200m	21.45 w (wind: +2.2 m/s)
2013	CARIFTA Games (U17)	Nassau, Bahamas	1st^{1}	110m hurdles (91 cm)	13.86 (wind: -2.3 m/s)
2013	CARIFTA Games (U17)	Nassau, Bahamas	1st	4 × 100 m relay	41.38
2013	CARIFTA Games (U17)	Nassau, Bahamas	3rd	4 × 400 m relay	3:16.47
2013	World Youth Championships	Donetsk, Ukraine	1st	110m hurdles (91 cm)	13.13 (wind: -1.1 m/s)
2013	World Youth Championships	Donetsk, Ukraine	1st^{2}	Medley relay	1:52.78^{2}
2014	CARIFTA Games (U18)	Fort-de-France, Martinique	1st	110m hurdles (91 cm)	13.10 w (wind: +2.2 m/s)
2014	CARIFTA Games (U18)	Fort-de-France, Martinique	1st	400m hurdles (84 cm)	51.21
2014	CARIFTA Games (U18)	Fort-de-France, Martinique	1st	4 × 400 m relay	3:12.63
2014	World Junior Championships	Eugene, Oregon, United States	1st	400m hurdles	49.29
2014	World Junior Championships	Eugene, Oregon, United States	3rd	4 × 400 m relay	3:04.47
2014	Youth Olympic Games	Nanjing, China	1st	110m hurdles (91 cm)	12.96 (wind: +1.3 m/s)
2015	CARIFTA Games (U20)	Basseterre, Saint Kitts and Nevis	1st	110m hurdles (99 cm)	13.36 w (wind: +3.3 m/s)
2015	CARIFTA Games (U20)	Basseterre, Saint Kitts and Nevis	1st	400m hurdles	50.96
2015	CARIFTA Games (U20)	Basseterre, Saint Kitts and Nevis	1st	4 × 400 m relay	3:09.13
2016	World U20 Championships	Bydgoszcz, Poland	1st	400m hurdles	49.03
2016	Olympic Games	Rio de Janeiro, Brazil	14th (sf)	400 m hurdles	49.17
2017	World Championships	London, England	12th (sf)	400 m hurdles	49.75
2018	Commonwealth Games	Gold Coast, Australia	3rd	400 m hurdles	49.16
2021	Olympic Games	Tokyo, Japan	24th (sf)	400 m hurdles	87.38
2022	World Championships	Eugene, Oregon, United States	6th	400 m hurdles	48.03
2023	World Championships	Budapest, Hungary	12th (sf)	400 m hurdles	48.49
2023	Pan American Games	Santiago, Chile	1st	400 m hurdles	49.19
2024	Olympic Games	Paris, France	22nd (sf)	400 m hurdles	50.03

^{1}: Exhibition event (no medals).
^{2}: Competed only in the heat.

Records
Preceded by Wilhem Belocian	Boys' World Youth Best Holder, 110 metres hurdles 23 August 2014 – 6 July 2019	Succeeded by Sasha Zhoya
