= Dawid Żebrowski =

Polish hurdler

Personal information
- Born: 8 January 1997 (age 29)

Sport
- Sport: Athletics
- Events: 110 m hurdles, 60 m hurdles
- Club: RLTL ZTE Radom
- Coached by: Artur Błasiński

Dawid Żebrowski (born 8 January 1997, Racibórz ) is a retired Polish athlete who specialised in the sprint hurdles. He represented his country at the 2018 World Indoor Championships without reaching the semifinals.

His personal bests are 13.69 seconds in the 110 metres hurdles (+1.1 m/s, Gävle 2019) and 7.74 seconds in the 60 metres hurdles (Toruń 2022).

== International competitions ==
Year	Competition	Venue	Position	Event	Notes
Representing Poland
2013	World Youth Championships	Donetsk, Ukraine	14th (sf)	110 m hurdles (91.4 cm)	13.88
2014	World Junior Championships	Eugene, United States	32nd (h)	110 m hurdles (99.0 cm)	14.04
2014	Youth Olympic Games	Nanjing, China	6th	110 m hurdles (91.4 cm)	13.71
2016	World U20 Championships	Bydgoszcz, Poland	5th	110 m hurdles (99.0 cm)	13.45
2017	European U23 Championships	Bydgoszcz, Poland	5th	110 m hurdles	13.90
2018	World Indoor Championships	Birmingham, United Kingdom	36th (h)	60 m hurdles	8.32
2019	European U23 Championships	Gävle, Sweden	6th	110 m hurdles	13.90
