= Júlio Oliveira =

Brazilian actor

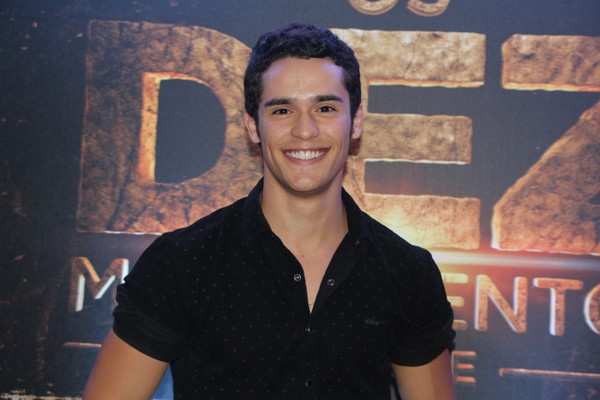
- Born: February 1, 1990 (age 35); São Paulo, Brazil
- Other names: Julio
- Occupation(s): Model, actor, dj
- Years active: 2003–present
- Height: 171 cm (5 ft 7 in)
- Website: www.instagram.com/juliooliveira1

Júlio César Oliveira da Silva (simply Julio Oliveira; born February 1, 1990) is a Brazilian actor, model and DJ. He is known for the telenovela Os Dez Mandamentos.

== Early life ==
Júlio Oliveira was born in São Paulo, Brazil on February 1, 1990. As a child he loved acting and he debuted on stage in 2003.

== Career ==
In 2010, he made his television debut in the telenovela Ti-ti-ti.in 2012 he was part of the play Equus. In 2013 he formed part of the telenovela Sangue Bom. In 2014 the same year he was part of the telenovela The Miracles of Jesus. In 2015 he was internationally recognized in the telenovela Os Dez Mandamentos. In 2018 he participated in the telenovela Carinha de Anjo. In 2018 he was part of the Netflix series Gamebros. In 2019 and 2020 he was part of the HBO series Hard. In 2020 he was part of the short film Offline.

He worked as a DJ and male model for magazines such as Junior Magazine and Mais Junior. In 2015 he caused a sensation during the filming of the novel Oz Dez Mandamentos for his appearance in gay magazines whose photos date from 2013.

== Filmography ==
Programme/film	Character	Year	Broadcaster
Ti-ti-ti	Ângelo Moura	2010–2011	TV Globo
Sangue Bom	Peixinho	2013	TV Globo
Os milagres de Jesus	Duma	2014	Record
Os dez Mandamentos	Chibale	2015–2016	Record
Filme B – A Van Assassina	Douglas	2017	AnCine TV
Filme B – O vampiro de Paulista	Escobar	2017	AnCine TV
Carinha de Anjo	Fernando	2018	SBT
Gamebros	Gael	2018	Netflix
A Garota da Moto	Laércio	2019	SBT
Making Of	Enzo	2019	Plataforma Virtual
Offline	Thiago	2020	Virtual Plataform
Hard	Felipe	2020	HBO MAX / HBO
