= 2025 European Athletics U23 Championships – Men's 110 metres hurdles =

Men's 110 metres hurdles at the 2025 European Athletics U23 Championships
- Venue: Fana Stadion
- Location: Bergen, Norway
- Dates: 17 July (heats); 18 July (semi-finals & final)
- Competitors: 37 from 23 nations
- Winning time: 13.46

Medalists
gold medal	Enzo Diessl	Austria
silver medal	Zeno van Neygen	Belgium
bronze medal	Elie Bacari	Belgium

The men's 110 metres hurdles event at the 2025 European Athletics U23 Championships was held in Bergen, Norway, at Fana Stadion on 17 and 18 July.

== Records ==
Prior to the competition, the records were as follows:

Record	Athlete (nation)	Time (s)	Location	Date
European U23 record	Ladji Doucouré (FRA)	12.97	Angers, France	15 July 2005
Championship U23 record	Sasha Zhoya (FRA)	13.22	Espoo, Finland	13 July 2023

== Results ==
=== Heats ===
First 4 in each heat (Q) and the next 4 fastest (q) qualified for the semi-finals.

==== Heat 1 ====
Place	Athlete	Nation	Time	Notes
1	Matthew Sophia	Netherlands	13.49	Q
2	Manuel Mordi	Germany	13.64	Q
3	Thomas Wilkes	France	13.73 [.721]	Q, PB
4	Jonáš Kolomaznik	Czech Republic	13.73 [.722]	Q
5	Christos-Panagiotis Roumtsios	Greece	13.89	q, SB
6	Markus Moberg	Sweden	14.12	q
7	Rafael Santos	Portugal	14.22	PB
8	Bogdan Vidojković	Serbia	14.38	
			Wind: (+0.5 m/s)	

==== Heat 2 ====
Place	Athlete	Nation	Time	Notes
1	Elie Bacari	Belgium	13.74	Q
2	Oliver Mulas	Italy	13.86	Q
3	Francisco Marques	Portugal	13.91	Q
4	Štěpán Štefko	Czech Republic	13.97	Q
5	Oron Karnivsky	Israel	14.08	q
6	Strahinja Radaković	Serbia	14.12	PB
7	Raiko Kahr	Estonia	14.96	
			Wind: (−0.9 m/s)	

==== Heat 3 ====
Place	Athlete	Nation	Time	Notes
1	Enzo Diessl	Austria	13.44	Q
2	Gonzalo Sabin Lamborena	Spain	13.87	Q
3	Daniel Goriola	Great Britain	13.95	Q
4	Rasmus Vehmaa	Finland	14.00	Q
5	Adam Ilgo	Slovakia	14.22	
6	Sagi Lamdiel	Israel	14.30	
—	Eduardo Neves	Portugal	DNF	
			Wind: (−0.1 m/s)	

==== Heat 4 ====
Place	Athlete	Nation	Time	Notes
1	Theo Pedre	France	13.63	Q
2	Joas van Hellemondt	Netherlands	13.66	Q
3	Fabio Küchler	Switzerland	13.74 [.738]	Q, PB
4	Dmytro Bahinskyi	Ukraine	13.74 [.740]	Q, PB
5	Bojan Novaković	Serbia	14.08	q, PB
6	Adam Nolan	Ireland	14.18	
7	Ričards Peders	Latvia	14.40	=PB
—	Edvin Assarsson	Sweden	DNS	
			Wind: (−1.9 m/s)	

==== Heat 5 ====
Place	Athlete	Nation	Time	Notes
1	Zeno van Neygen	Belgium	13.81 [.801]	Q
2	Erwann Cinna	France	13.81 [.802]	Q
3	Szymon Basaj	Poland	13.99	Q
4	Volodymyr Kilko	Ukraine	14.24	Q
5	Farkas Felber	Hungary	14.30	
6	Eyal Uziel	Israel	14.56	
—	Jamie Sesay	Netherlands	DNS	
			Wind: (−1.4 m/s)	

=== Semi-finals ===
First 2 in each heat (Q) and the next 2 fastest (q) qualified for the final.

==== Heat 1 ====
Place	Athlete	Nation	Time	Notes
1	Elie Bacari	Belgium	13.66	Q
2	Theo Pedre	France	13.76	Q
3	Gonzalo Sabin Lamborena	Spain	13.84	
4	Oliver Mulas	Italy	13.84	
5	Jonáš Kolomaznik	Czech Republic	13.87	
6	Szymon Basaj	Poland	14.18	
7	Volodymyr Kilko	Ukraine	14.51	
8	Oron Karnivsky	Israel	14.56	
			Wind: (−1.8 m/s)	

==== Heat 2 ====
Place	Athlete	Nation	Time	Notes
1	Enzo Diessl	Austria	13.48	Q
2	Manuel Mordi	Germany	13.57	Q, SB
3	Joas van Hellemondt	Netherlands	13.62	q
4	Thomas Wilkes	France	13.75	
5	Štěpán Štefko	Czech Republic	14.06	
6	Markus Moberg	Sweden	14.29	
7	Francisco Marques	Portugal	14.31	
8	Rasmus Vehmaa	Finland	14.42	
			Wind: (−1.1 m/s)	

==== Heat 3 ====
Place	Athlete	Nation	Time	Notes
1	Matthew Sophia	Netherlands	13.48	Q
2	Erwann Cinna	France	13.61	Q
3	Zeno van Neygen	Belgium	13.71	q
4	Dmytro Bahinskyi	Ukraine	13.90	
5	Daniel Goriola	Great Britain	13.92	
6	Fabio Küchler	Switzerland	13.99	
7	Christos-Panagiotis Roumtsios	Greece	14.36	
8	Bojan Novaković	Serbia	14.46	
			Wind: (−1.4 m/s)	

=== Final ===
Place	Athlete	Nation	Time	Notes
1st place, gold medalist(s)	Enzo Diessl	Austria	13.46	
2nd place, silver medalist(s)	Zeno van Neygen	Belgium	13.54	PB
3rd place, bronze medalist(s)	Elie Bacari	Belgium	13.56	
4	Erwann Cinna	France	13.58	
5	Theo Pedre	France	13.60	
6	Manuel Mordi	Germany	13.65	
7	Joas van Hellemondt	Netherlands	13.71	
—	Matthew Sophia	Netherlands	DNF	
			Wind: (−1.8 m/s)	
