= 2024 European Athletics Championships – Men's 110 metres hurdles =

Men's 110 metres hurdles at the 2024 European Athletics Championships
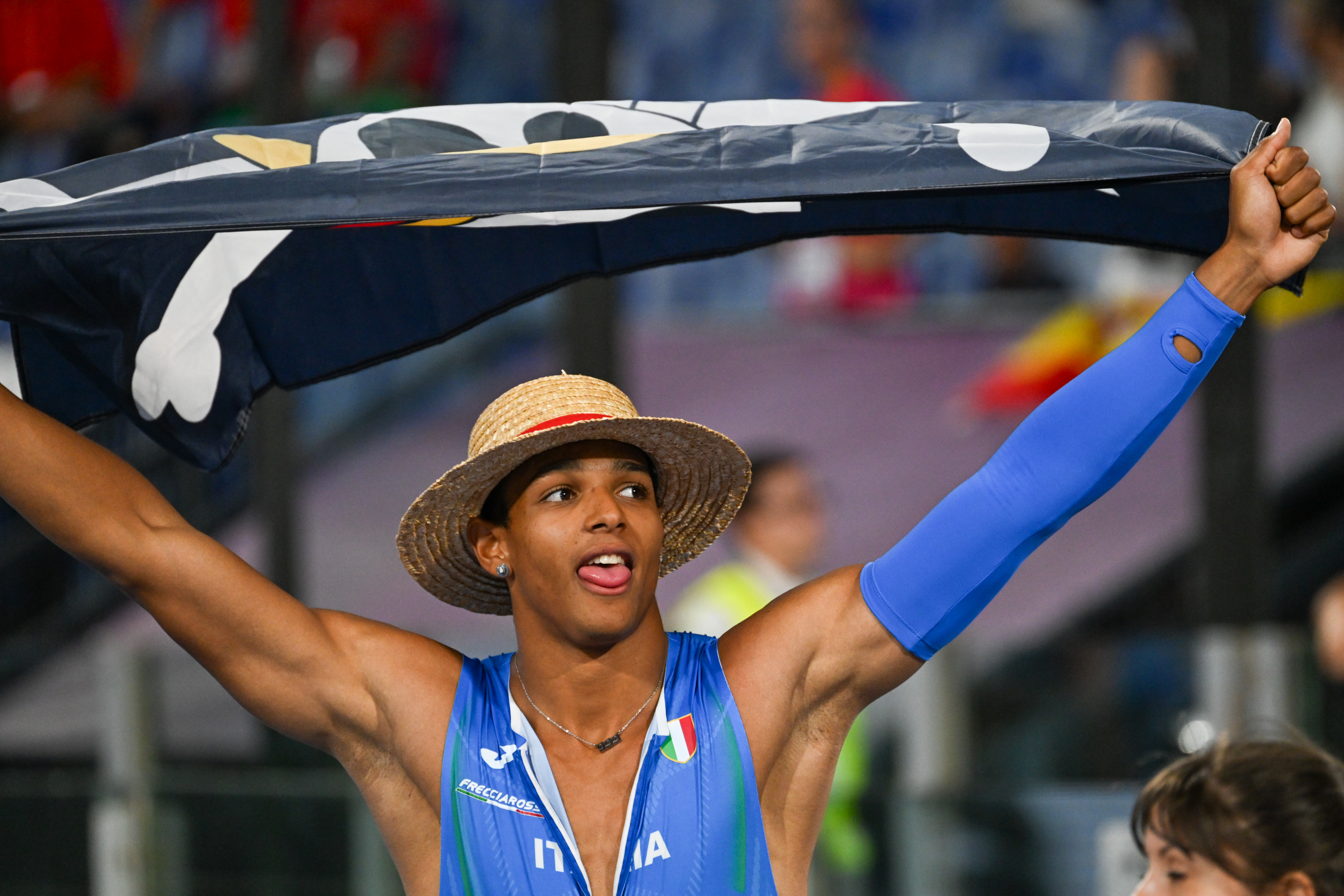
- Venue: Stadio Olimpico
- Location: Rome
- Dates: 7 June (heats); 8 June (semifinals & final)
- Competitors: 34 from 19 nations
- Winning time: 13.05

Medalists
gold medal	Lorenzo Simonelli	Italy
silver medal	Enrique Llopis	Spain
bronze medal	Jason Joseph	Switzerland

The men's 110 metres hurdles at the 2024 European Athletics Championships took place at the Stadio Olimpico on 7 and 8 June.

== Records ==
Standing records prior to the 2024 European Athletics Championships
World record	Aries Merritt (USA)	12.80	Brussels, Belgium	7 September 2012
European record	Colin Jackson (GBR)	12.91	Stuttgart, Germany	20 August 1993
Championship record	Colin Jackson (GBR)	13.02	Budapest, Hungary	22 August 1998
World Leading	Grant Holloway (USA)	13.03	Eugene, Oregon, United States	25 May 2024
Europe Leading	Michael Obasuyi (BEL)	13.20	Montgeron, France	19 May 2024

== Schedule ==
Date	Time	Round
7 June 2024	10:40	Round 1
8 June 2024	20:38	Semifinals
8 June 2024	22:18	Final

All times are local times (UTC+2)

== Results ==
=== Round 1 ===
The next 14 fastest (q) advanced to the semifinals. The 10 highest ranked athletes received a bye into the semifinals.

Wind:
Heat 1: +0.9 m/s, Heat 2: +0.1 m/s, Heat 3: -1.3 m/s

Rank	Heat	Lane	Name	Nationality	Time	Note
1	1	5	Jakub Szymański	Poland	13.53	q
2	1	3	Enzo Diessl	Austria	13.56	q
3	2	7	Elie Bacari	Belgium	13.61	q
4	1	8	Filip Jakob Demšar	Slovenia	13.67	q
5	1	9	Tim Eikermann	Germany	13.69	q
6	1	2	Timme Koster	Netherlands	13.70	q, SB
7	1	4	Hassane Fofana	Italy	13.70	q, SB
8	2	5	Mikdat Sevler	Turkey	13.72	q
9	2	2	Romain Lecoeur	France	13.75	q
10	3	8	Manuel Mordi	Germany	13.78	q
11	3	2	Krzysztof Kiljan	Poland	13.78	q
12	1	7	Orlando Ortega	Spain	13.79	q
13	2	4	Bálint Szeles	Hungary	13.81	q
14	2	8	Santeri Kuusiniemi	Finland	13.84	q
15	2	3	Nicolò Giacalone	Italy	13.86	
16	3	7	Alin Ionuț Anton	Romania	13.90	
17	3	4	Vladimir Vukicevic	Norway	13.93	
18	2	6	Kevin Sánchez	Spain	13.95	
19	3	9	Mathieu Jaquet	Switzerland	14.00	
20	3	5	Konstantinos Douvalidis	Greece	14.04	
21	1	6	Dániel Eszes	Hungary	14.09	
22	3	6	Elmo Lakka	Finland	14.10	
	2	9	Max Hrelja	Sweden	DNF	
	3	3	Job Geerds	Netherlands	DNF	

=== Semifinals ===
First 2 in each heat (Q) and the next 2 fastest (q) advance to final.

Wind:
Heat 1: 0.0 m/s, Heat 2: 0.0 m/s, Heat 3: +0.5 m/s

Rank	Heat	Lane	Name	Nationality	Time	Note
1	3	4	Lorenzo Simonelli*	Italy	13.20	Q, =EL
2	3	5	Enrique Llopis*	Spain	13.22	Q, PB
3	1	6	Asier Martínez*	Spain	13.29	Q, =SB
4	1	5	Michael Obasuyi*	Belgium	13.31	Q
5	2	6	Jason Joseph*	Switzerland	13.35	Q, =SB
6	2	5	Raphaël Mohamed*	France	13.37	Q
7	2	7	Damian Czykier*	Poland	13.44	q
8	2	8	Elie Bacari	Belgium	13.44	q, PB
9	1	3	Romain Lecoeur	France	13.47	
9	3	7	Milan Trajkovic*	Cyprus	13.47	SB
11	1	9	Filip Jakob Demšar	Slovenia	13.59	PB
12	2	9	Tim Eikermann	Germany	13.62	
13	2	2	Orlando Ortega	Spain	13.64	
14	3	8	Mikdat Sevler	Turkey	13.68	
15	1	4	Manuel Mordi	Germany	13.70	
15	2	3	Hassane Fofana	Italy	13.70	
17	2	4	Enzo Diessl	Austria	13.71	
18	1	2	Timme Koster	Netherlands	13.72	
19	1	7	Tade Ojora*	Great Britain	13.76	
20	3	9	Bálint Szeles	Hungary	13.83	
21	3	2	Santeri Kuusiniemi	Finland	13.84	qR
22	3	6	Mark Heiden*	Netherlands	24.42	
	1	8	Krzysztof Kiljan	Poland	DNF	
	3	3	Jakub Szymański	Poland	DQ	TR17.1.2(0)

*Athletes that received a bye into the semifinal

=== Final ===
Wind: +0.6 m/s

Rank	Lane	Name	Nationality	Time	Note
1st place, gold medalist(s)	5	Lorenzo Simonelli	Italy	13.05	EL
2nd place, silver medalist(s)	7	Enrique Llopis	Spain	13.16	PB
3rd place, bronze medalist(s)	6	Jason Joseph	Switzerland	13.43	
4	3	Raphaël Mohamed	France	13.45	
4	4	Asier Martínez	Spain	13.45	
6	8	Michael Obasuyi	Belgium	13.46	
7	1	Santeri Kuusiniemi	Finland	13.84	
		Damian Czykier	Poland	DNF	
	2	Elie Bacari	Belgium	DQ	TR22.6.2
