= 2021 World Athletics U20 Championships – Men's 110 metres hurdles =

Men's 110 metres hurdles at the 2021 World Athletics U20 Championships
- Venue: Kasarani Stadium
- Dates: 20 August (heats and semifinals); 21 August (final)
- Competitors: 28 from 22 nations
- Winning time: 12.72

Medalists
gold medal	Sasha Zhoya	France
silver medal	Vashaun Vascianna	Jamaica
bronze medal	Jakub Szymański	Poland

The men's 110 metres hurdles at the 2021 World Athletics U20 Championships was held at the Kasarani Stadium on 20 and 21 August.

== Records ==
Standing records prior to the 2021 World Athletics U20 Championships
World U20 Record	Wilhem Belocian (FRA)	12.99	Eugene, United States	24 July 2014
World U20 Record	Damion Thomas (JAM)	12.99	Kingston, Jamaica	23 June 2018
Championship Record	Wilhem Belocian (FRA)	12.99	Eugene, United States	24 July 2014
World U20 Leading	Sasha Zhoya (FRA)	13.02	Bondoufle, France	10 July 2021

== Results ==
=== Heats ===
Qualification: First 3 of each heat (Q) and the 4 fastest times (q) qualified for the semifinals.

Wind:
Heat 1: +0.2 m/s, Heat 2: +1.0 m/s, Heat 3: +0.3 m/s, Heat 4: +1.5 m/s

Rank	Heat	Name	Nationality	Time	Note
1	3	Sasha Zhoya	France	13.12	Q
2	2	Vashaun Vascianna	Jamaica	13.37	Q, SB
3	3	John Paredes	Colombia	13.49	Q, PB
4	4	Jakub Szymański	Poland	13.52	Q
5	4	Erwann Cinna	France	13.60	Q
6	1	Prosper Oghenemine Ekporore	Nigeria	13.71	Q, PB
7	2	Rian Pereira	Brazil	13.71	Q
8	4	Cheung Siu Hang	Hong Kong	13.72	Q, NU20R
9	3	Mondray Barnard	South Africa	13.76	Q
10	4	Štěpán Schubert	Czech Republic	13.77	q
11	4	Marc Brian Louis	Singapore	13.77	q, NU20R
12	1	Yousuf Badawy Sayed	Egypt	13.79	Q, PB
12	3	Saeed Othman Al-Absi	Qatar	13.79	q
14	4	Jorim Léonard Bangue	Cameroon	13.80	q, NU20R
15	1	Olivér Almási	Hungary	13.82	Q
16	1	Lorenzo Ndele Simonelli	Italy	13.83	
17	3	Tejas Shirse	India	13.87	
18	2	Tomáš Oberndorfer	Czech Republic	13.95	Q
19	1	Matvey Gerasimov	Authorised Neutral Athletes	13.98	
20	2	Omar Khaled Mohamed	Egypt	14.01	
21	1	Jovan Čanak	Serbia	14.05	
22	2	Riccardo Berrino	Italy	14.06	
23	3	Antoine Andrews	Bahamas	14.08	
24	2	Bogdan Vidojković	Serbia	14.18	
25	3	Lukas Cik	Croatia	14.19	
26	2	Richard Nagy	Hungary	14.27	
27	4	Ayetullah Demir	Turkey	14.54	
28	2	Patrick Muindi	Kenya	15.27	PB
	4	Anatoliy Kiselev	Authorised Neutral Athletes	DNS	
	1	Fabrício Júlio de Sousa	Brazil	DNS	

=== Semifinals ===
Qualification: First 3 of each heat (Q) and the 2 fastest times (q) qualified for the final.

Wind:
Heat 1: +0.1 m/s, Heat 2: -0.4 m/s

Rank	Heat	Name	Nationality	Time	Note
1	2	Sasha Zhoya	France	12.93	Q, WU20R
2	1	Vashaun Vascianna	Jamaica	13.35	Q, SB
3	2	John Paredes	Colombia	13.46	Q, PB
4	1	Jakub Szymański	Poland	13.50	Q
5	1	Erwann Cinna	France	13.51	Q, PB
6	1	Saeed Othman Al-Absi	Qatar	13.52	q, NU20R
7	2	Cheung Siu Hang	Hong Kong	13.57	Q, NU20R
8	1	Štěpán Schubert	Czech Republic	13.63	q, PB
9	1	Mondray Barnard	South Africa	13.65	
10	1	Rian Pereira	Brazil	13.78	
11	2	Marc Brian Louis	Singapore	13.83	
12	2	Jorim Léonard Bangue	Cameroon	13.92	
13	1	Olivér Almási	Hungary	14.23	
14	2	Prosper Oghenemine Ekporore	Nigeria	15.70	qR
	2	Yousuf Badawy Sayed	Egypt	DNF	
	2	Tomáš Oberndorfer	Czech Republic	DQ	TR22.6.2

=== Final ===
The final was held on 21 August at 16:19.

Wind: +1.0 m/s

Rank	Lane	Name	Nationality	Time	Note
1st place, gold medalist(s)	4	Sasha Zhoya	France	12.72	WU20R
2nd place, silver medalist(s)	7	Vashaun Vascianna	Jamaica	13.25	PB
3rd place, bronze medalist(s)	6	Jakub Szymański	Poland	13.43	PB
4	2	Saeed Othman Al-Absi	Qatar	13.46	NU20R
5	9	Erwann Cinna	France	13.50	PB
6	5	John Paredes	Colombia	13.52	
7	8	Cheung Siu Hang	Hong Kong	13.53	NU20R
8	3	Štěpán Schubert	Czech Republic	13.69	
9	1	Prosper Oghenemine Ekporore	Nigeria	21.60	
