= 2023 European Athletics U23 Championships – Men's 110 metres hurdles =

Men's 110 metres hurdles at the 2023 European Athletics U23 Championships
- Venue: Leppävaara Stadium
- Location: Espoo, Finland
- Dates: 14 July (heats & semi-finals); 15 July (final)
- Competitors: 33 from 23 nations
- Winning time: 13.31

Medalists
gold medal	Sasha Zhoya	France
silver medal	Lorenzo Simonelli	Italy
bronze medal	Erwann Cinna	France

The men's 110 metres hurdles event at the 2023 European Athletics U23 Championships was held in Espoo, Finland, at Leppävaara Stadium on 14 and 15 July.

== Records ==
Prior to the competition, the records were as follows:

European U23 record	Ladji Doucouré (FRA)	12.97	Angers, France	15 July 2005
Championship U23 record	Ladji Doucouré (FRA)	13.23	Bydgoszcz, Poland	20 July 2003

== Results ==
=== Heats ===
First 2 in each heat (Q) and the next 6 fastest (q) advance to the semi-finals.

==== Heat 1 ====
Place	Athlete	Nation	Time	Notes
1	Timme Koster	Netherlands	13.66	Q
2	Diego Andres	Spain	13.80	Q, PB
3	Štěpán Schubert	Czech Republic	13.86	q
4	Christos-Panagiotis Roumtsios	Greece	13.96	q, PB
5	Bogdan Vidojković	Serbia	14.10	q
6	Herman Ellingsen	Norway	14.91	
			Wind: (+1.6 m/s)	

==== Heat 2 ====
Place	Athlete	Nation	Time	Notes
1	Erwann Cinna	France	13.74	Q
2	Gregory Minoue	Germany	14.00	Q
3	Alessio Sommacal	Italy	14.12	q, =PB
4	Kenro Tohter	Estonia	14.26	
5	Sidrak Afework	Sweden	14.48	
6	Domas Gailevičius	Lithuania	14.64	
—	Job Geerds	Netherlands	DNF	
			Wind: (−2.3 m/s)	

==== Heat 3 ====
Place	Athlete	Nation	Time	Notes
1	Sasha Zhoya	France	13.63	Q
2	Manuel Mordi	Germany	13.89	Q
3	Gonzalo Sabin Lamborena	Spain	14.33	
4	Ioannis Kamarinos	Greece	14.42	
5	James Ezeonu	Ireland	14.43	
6	Ryan Nigel Wright	Switzerland	14.69	
7	Alexandru Toader	Romania	14.70	
			Wind: (−1.7 m/s)	

==== Heat 4 ====
Place	Athlete	Nation	Time	Notes
1	Jakub Szymański	Poland	13.78	Q
2	Mark Heiden	Netherlands	13.95	Q
3	Nick Rüegg	Switzerland	14.03	q
4	Lukas Cik	Croatia	14.44	
5	Dobromir Nikolov	Bulgaria	14.53	
6	Francisco Marques	Portugal	14.55	
			Wind: (±0.0 m/s)	

==== Heat 5 ====
Place	Athlete	Nation	Time	Notes
1	Lorenzo Simonelli	Italy	13.74	Q
2	Elie Bacari	Belgium	13.84	Q
3	Kenny Fletcher	France	14.13	q
4	Serhat Bulut	Turkey	14.38	
5	Fabio Kobelt	Switzerland	14.53	
6	Andreas Christoffersen	Denmark	14.62	
7	Volodymyr Kilko	Ukraine	14.77	
			Wind: (±0.0 m/s)	

=== Semi-finals ===
First 3 in each heat (Q) and the next 2 fastest (q) advance to the final.

==== Heat 1 ====
Place	Athlete	Nation	Time	Notes
1	Sasha Zhoya	France	13.22	Q, CR
2	Lorenzo Simonelli	Italy	13.33	Q, NU23R
3	Jakub Szymański	Poland	13.63	Q
4	Mark Heiden	Netherlands	13.64	q
5	Manuel Mordi	Germany	13.66	q
6	Kenny Fletcher	France	14.03	
7	Christos-Panagiotis Roumtsios	Greece	14.08	
8	Nick Rüegg	Switzerland	14.13	
			Wind: (+0.3 m/s)	

==== Heat 2 ====
Place	Athlete	Nation	Time	Notes
1	Erwann Cinna	France	13.58	Q
2	Timme Koster	Netherlands	13.62	Q
3	Štěpán Schubert	Czech Republic	13.88	Q
4	Elie Bacari	Belgium	13.94	
5	Diego Andres	Spain	13.97	
6	Gregory Minoue	Germany	14.00	
7	Alessio Sommacal	Italy	14.11	PB
8	Bogdan Vidojković	Serbia	14.26	
			Wind: (−0.7 m/s)	

=== Final ===
Place	Athlete	Nation	Time	Notes
1st place, gold medalist(s)	Sasha Zhoya	France	13.31	
2nd place, silver medalist(s)	Lorenzo Simonelli	Italy	13.36	
3rd place, bronze medalist(s)	Erwann Cinna	France	13.47	PB
4	Timme Koster	Netherlands	13.52	NU23R
5	Mark Heiden	Netherlands	13.61	
6	Jakub Szymański	Poland	13.65	
7	Manuel Mordi	Germany	13.69	
8	Štěpán Schubert	Czech Republic	17.44	
			Wind: (+0.5 m/s)	
