= 2026 Meeting de Paris =

Athletics meeting in Paris, France

- Dates: 28 June 2026
- Host city: Paris, France
- Venue: Stade Sébastien Charléty
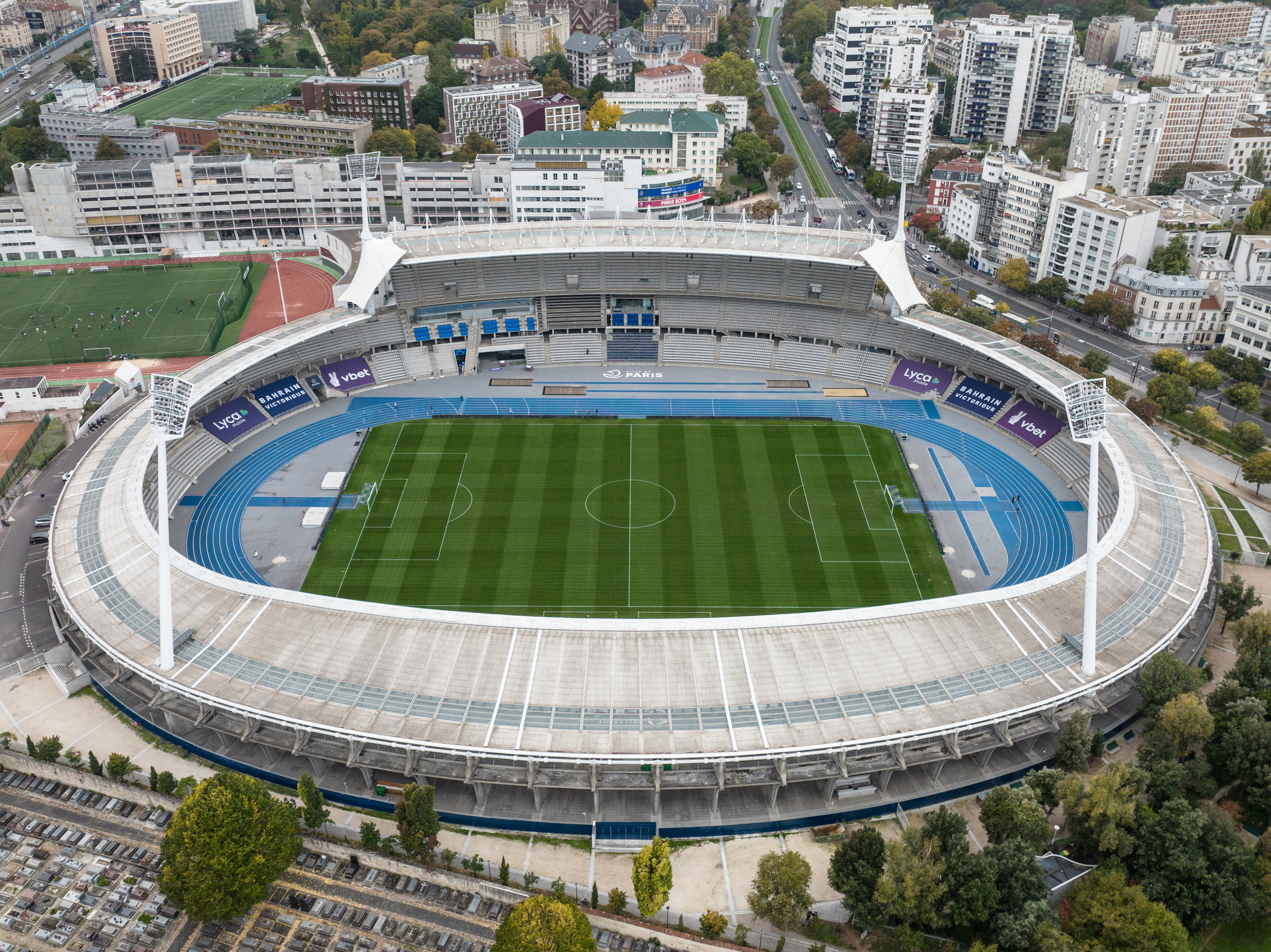
- Level: 2026 Diamond League

The 2026 Meeting de Paris was the 31st edition of the annual outdoor track and field meeting in Paris, France. Held on 28 June at the Stade Sébastien Charléty, it was the eighth leg of the 2026 Diamond League – the highest level international track and field circuit.

== Diamond+ events results ==
=== Men's ===
100 Metres
Place	Athlete	Nation	Time	Points	Notes
1st place, gold medalist(s)	Trayvon Bromell	United States	9.91	8	SB
2nd place, silver medalist(s)	Noah Lyles	United States	9.92	7	
3rd place, bronze medalist(s)	Marcell Jacobs	Italy	9.96	6	SB
4	Akani Simbine	South Africa	9.97	5	SB
5	Jordan Anthony	United States	9.99	4	
6	Ferdinand Omanyala	Kenya	10.02 [.011]	3	
7	Andre De Grasse	Canada	10.02 [.017]	2	
8	Jeremiah Azu	Great Britain	10.18	1	
			Wind: (+0.1 m/s)		

400 Metres
Place	Athlete	Nation	Time	Points	Notes
1st place, gold medalist(s)	Collen Kebinatshipi	Botswana	43.54	8	DLR, SB
2nd place, silver medalist(s)	Zakithi Nene	South Africa	43.89	7	
3rd place, bronze medalist(s)	Christopher Bailey	United States	44.06	6	
4	Matthew Hudson-Smith	Great Britain	44.09	5	
5	Muzala Samukonga	Zambia	44.29	4	
6	Jereem Richards	Trinidad and Tobago	44.53	3	
7	Muhammad Abdallah Kounta	France	44.88	2	

110 Metres hurdles - Heats
Place	Athlete	Nation	Time	Notes
Heat 1
1	Kendrick Smallwood	United States	13.09	Q
2	Jamal Britt	United States	13.14	Q
3	Michael Obasuyi	Belgium	13.16	Q, NR
4	Shunsuke Izumiya	Japan	13.22	q
5	Thomas Wilkes	France	13.27	q, PB
6	Romain Lecoeur	France	13.40	
7	Dylan Beard	United States	13.42	
8	Freddie Crittenden	United States	13.64	SB
			Wind: (+0.2 m/s)	
Heat 2
1	Trey Cunningham	United States	13.06	Q
2	Kendry Menéndez	Cuba	13.15	Q
3	Rachid Muratake	Japan	13.30	Q
4	Just Kwaou-Mathey	France	13.32	SB
5	Enrique Llopis	Spain	13.34	
6	Asier Martínez	Spain	13.39	
7	Eric Edwards Jr.	United States	13.57	
8	Erwann Cinna	France	13.74	
			Wind: (−0.8 m/s)	

110 Metres hurdles
Place	Athlete	Nation	Time	Points	Notes
1st place, gold medalist(s)	Jamal Britt	United States	12.89	8	PB
2nd place, silver medalist(s)	Shunsuke Izumiya	Japan	13.01	7	
3rd place, bronze medalist(s)	Trey Cunningham	United States	13.07	6	
4	Michael Obasuyi	Belgium	13.10	5	NR
5	Rachid Muratake	Japan	13.21	4	
6	Kendry Menéndez	Cuba	13.24	3	
7	Thomas Wilkes	France	13.32	2	
8	Kendrick Smallwood	United States	13.46	1	
			Wind: (+0.8 m/s)		

Pole vault
Place	Athlete	Nation	Height	Points	Notes
1st place, gold medalist(s)	Armand Duplantis	Sweden	6.13 m	8	MR
2nd place, silver medalist(s)	Baptiste Thiery	France	5.93 m	7	PB
3rd place, bronze medalist(s)	Emmanouil Karalis	Greece	5.83 m	6	
4	Chris Nilsen	United States	5.83 m	5	
5	Sondre Guttormsen	Norway	5.83 m	4	
6	Zach Bradford	United States	5.83 m	3	
7	Kurtis Marschall	Australia	5.83 m	2	
8	Sam Kendricks	United States	5.73 m	1	
9	Thibaut Collet	France	5.73 m		
10	Zackaria Dia	France	5.63 m		
10	KC Lightfoot	United States	5.63 m		
12	Renaud Lavillenie	France	5.43 m		

=== Women's ===
400 Metres
Place	Athlete	Nation	Time	Points	Notes
1st place, gold medalist(s)	Marileidy Paulino	Dominican Republic	48.48	8	DLR, WL
2nd place, silver medalist(s)	Lurdes Gloria Manuel	Czech Republic	49.37	7	PB
3rd place, bronze medalist(s)	Stacey-Ann Williams	Jamaica	49.51	6	
4	Lieke Klaver	Netherlands	49.97	5	SB
5	Sharlene Mawdsley	Ireland	50.06	4	PB
6	Roxana Gómez	Cuba	50.07	3	SB
7	Natalia Bukowiecka	Poland	50.81	2	
8	Isabelle Black	France	51.15	1	PB

800 Metres
Place	Athlete	Nation	Time	Points	Notes
1st place, gold medalist(s)	Audrey Werro	Switzerland	1:53.80	8	DLR, NR, WL
2nd place, silver medalist(s)	Femke Broeders-Bol	Netherlands	1:55.60	7	PB
3rd place, bronze medalist(s)	Anaïs Bourgoin	France	1:55.65	6	NR
4	Prudence Sekgodiso	South Africa	1:56.83	5	PB
5	Rénelle Lamote	France	1:56.93	4	PB
6	Sarah Billings	Australia	1:57.01	3	AR
7	Oratile Nowe	Botswana	1:57.46	2	
8	Clara Liberman	France	1:58.34	1	PB
9	Roisin Willis	United States	1:58.66		
10	Souad Elhaddad	Morocco	1:58.90		
—	Myrte van der Schoot	Netherlands	DNF		PM

100 Metres hurdles - Heats
Place	Athlete	Nation	Time	Notes
Heat 1
1	Tobi Amusan	Nigeria	12.39	Q
2	Nadine Visser	Netherlands	12.44	Q, SB
3	Demisha Roswell	Jamaica	12.46	Q
4	Rayniah Jones	United States	12.52	q
5	Pia Skrzyszowska	Poland	12.53	q, SB
6	Alia Armstrong	United States	12.57	
7	Laëticia Bapté	France	12.66	PB
			Wind: (+0.4 m/s)	
Heat 2
1	Alaysha Johnson	United States	12.42	Q, SB
2	Grace Stark	United States	12.51	Q
3	Megan Simmonds	Jamaica	12.53	Q
4	Devynne Charlton	Bahamas	12.55	
5	Kendra Harrison	United States	12.61	
6	Marione Fourie	South Africa	12.66	
7	Sacha Alessandrini	France	12.82	
			Wind: (+0.6 m/s)	

100 Metres hurdles
Place	Athlete	Nation	Time	Points	Notes
1st place, gold medalist(s)	Tobi Amusan	Nigeria	12.28	8	=SB
2nd place, silver medalist(s)	Grace Stark	United States	12.38	7	SB
3rd place, bronze medalist(s)	Alaysha Johnson	United States	12.39	6	SB
4	Nadine Visser	Netherlands	12.41	5	SB
5	Pia Skrzyszowska	Poland	12.46	4	SB
6	Rayniah Jones	United States	12.60	3	
7	Demisha Roswell	Jamaica	12.78	2	
8	Megan Simmonds	Jamaica	12.92	1	
			Wind: (+0.7 m/s)		

Pole Vault
Place	Athlete	Nation	Height	Points	Notes
1st place, gold medalist(s)	Angelica Moser	Switzerland	4.77 m	8	
2nd place, silver medalist(s)	Eliza McCartney	New Zealand	4.70 m	7	
3rd place, bronze medalist(s)	Nina Kennedy	Australia	4.70 m	6	
4	Emily Grove	United States	4.60 m	5	
4	Tina Šutej	Slovenia	4.60 m	5	
6	Gabriela Leon	United States	4.60 m	3	
7	Imogen Ayris	New Zealand	4.60 m	2	
8	Olivia McTaggart	New Zealand	4.45 m	1	
8	Bérénice Petit	France	4.45 m	1	
10	Brynn King	United States	4.45 m		
11	Marie-Julie Bonnin	France	4.45 m		
11	Wilma Murto	Finland	4.45 m		

== Diamond events results ==
=== Men's ===
800 Metres
Place	Athlete	Nation	Time	Points	Notes
1st place, gold medalist(s)	Marco Arop	Canada	1:41.84	8	WL
2nd place, silver medalist(s)	Niels Laros	Netherlands	1:43.60	7	PB
3rd place, bronze medalist(s)	Tobias Grønstad	Norway	1:43.63	6	
4	Ben Pattison	Great Britain	1:43.71	5	
5	Eliott Crestan	Belgium	1:44.23	4	
6	Louey Ouerrat	France	1:44.40 [.396]	3	
7	Yanis Meziane	France	1:44.40 [.400]	2	
8	Gabriel Tual	France	1:44.92	1	
9	Mohamed Attaoui	Spain	1:45.09		
—	Slimane Moula	Algeria	DNF		
—	Patryk Sieradzki	Poland	DNF		PM

5000 Metres
Place	Athlete	Nation	Time	Points	Notes
1st place, gold medalist(s)	Grant Fisher	United States	12:54.80	8	
2nd place, silver medalist(s)	Jacob Krop	Kenya	12:55.22	7	SB
3rd place, bronze medalist(s)	Andreas Almgren	Sweden	12:55.38	6	
4	Egide Ntakarutimana	Burundi	12:56.06	5	NR
5	Birhanu Balew	Bahrain	12:56.66	4	
6	Graham Blanks	United States	12:57.12	3	
7	Jimmy Gressier	France	12:57.79	2	
8	Cornelius Kemboi	Kenya	12:58.10	1	
9	Mathew Kipsang	Kenya	12:58.95		SB
10	Saymon Amanuel	Eritrea	12:59.37		PB
11	Santiago Catrofe	Uruguay	13:02.57		SB
12	Addisu Yihune	Ethiopia	13:03.22		
13	Frankline Kibet	Kenya	13:08.32		PB
14	Florian Bremm	Germany	13:10.39		
15	Khairi Bejiga	Ethiopia	13:15.41		
16	Getnet Wale	Ethiopia	13:15.68		
17	Eduardo Herrera	Mexico	13:16.18		
18	Valentín Soca	Uruguay	13:19.69		
19	Kuma Girma	Ethiopia	13:33.07		
—	Etienne Daguinos	France	DNF		
—	Lamecha Girma	Ethiopia	DNF		
—	Tim Verbaandert	Netherlands	DNF		PM
—	Saïd Mechaal	Spain	DNF		PM

3000 Metres steeplechase
Place	Athlete	Nation	Time	Points	Notes
1st place, gold medalist(s)	Karl Bebendorf	Germany	8:05.55	8	PB
2nd place, silver medalist(s)	Gemechu Godana	Ethiopia	8:05.86	7	PB
3rd place, bronze medalist(s)	Edmund Serem	Kenya	8:08.54	6	
4	Samuel Firewu	Ethiopia	8:09.13	5	SB
5	Ryuji Miura	Japan	8:10.70	4	SB
6	Matthew Wilkinson	United States	8:11.35	3	
7	Abrham Sime	Ethiopia	8:13.48	2	SB
8	Nicolas-Marie Daru	France	8:13.89	1	
9	Abraham Kibiwot	Kenya	8:14.43		
10	Baptiste Fourmont	France	8:14.87		
11	Ruben Querinjean	Luxembourg	8:15.45		
12	Osama Zoghlami	Italy	8:17.23		
13	Pierre Boudy	France	8:19.50		
14	Luc le Baron	France	8:20.06		
15	Carson Williams	United States	8:20.67		
16	Daniel Arce	Spain	8:20.99		
17	Jean-Simon Desgagnés	Canada	8:23.50		
18	Hailemariyam Amare	Ethiopia	8:32.74		
19	Oscar Thebaud	France	8:45.31		
—	Abderrafia Bouassel	Morocco	DNF		PM
—	Wilberforce Chemiat Kones	Kenya	DNF		PM
—	Mohamed Tindouft	Morocco	DNF		

=== Women's ===
1500 Metres
Place	Athlete	Nation	Time	Points	Notes
1st place, gold medalist(s)	Georgia Hunter Bell	Great Britain	3:55.63	8	SB
2nd place, silver medalist(s)	Freweyni Hailu	Ethiopia	3:55.92	7	SB
3rd place, bronze medalist(s)	Agathe Guillemot	France	3:56.24	6	NR
4	Jessica Hull	Australia	3:57.22	5	SB
5	Abbey Caldwell	Australia	3:57.59	4	
6	Nelly Jepkosgei	Bahrain	3:57.61	3	PB
7	Patricia Silva	Portugal	3:58.74	2	PB
8	Linden Hall	Australia	4:00.00	1	
9	Soukaina Hajji	Morocco	4:00.62		PB
10	Katie Snowden	Great Britain	4:00.91		SB
11	Sarah Healy	Ireland	4:01.50		
12	Haregeweyni Kalayu	Ethiopia	4:02.70 [.692]		
13	Aster Areri	Ethiopia	4:02.70 [.695]		
14	Adèle Gay	France	4:03.13		PB
15	Bérénice Cleyet-Merle	France	4:03.58		PB
16	Salomé Afonso	Portugal	4:06.36		
—	Andrea Rodríguez	Spain	DNF		PM

Shot put
Place	Athlete	Nation	Distance	Points	Notes
1st place, gold medalist(s)	Sarah Mitton	Canada	19.99 m	8	
2nd place, silver medalist(s)	Yemisi Mabry	Germany	19.93 m	7	
3rd place, bronze medalist(s)	Jessica Schilder	Netherlands	19.88 m	6	
4	Axelina Johansson	Sweden	19.25 m	5	
5	Fanny Roos	Sweden	19.17 m	4	
6	Danniel Thomas-Dodd	Jamaica	18.88 m	3	
7	Abria Smith	United States	18.46 m	2	
8	Jaida Ross	United States	18.18 m	1	
9	Adelaide Aquilla	United States	18.09 m		

Javelin throw
Place	Athlete	Nation	Distance	Points	Notes
1st place, gold medalist(s)	Yan Ziyi	China	67.44 m	8	
2nd place, silver medalist(s)	Adriana Vilagoš	Serbia	63.83 m	7	SB
3rd place, bronze medalist(s)	Haruka Kitaguchi	Japan	63.01 m	6	SB
4	Alizée Minard	France	61.51 m	5	PB
5	Flor Ruiz	Colombia	61.23 m	4	
6	Jade Maraval	France	59.97 m	3	
7	Maria Andrejczyk	Poland	59.58 m	2	
8	Sara Kolak	Croatia	58.35 m	1	
9	Sigrid Borge	Norway	56.92 m		
10	Tori Peeters	New Zealand	55.89 m		
11	Elina Tzengko	Greece	54.35 m		
12	Juleisy Angulo	Ecuador	52.91 m		
—	Anete Sietiņa	Latvia	NM		

== Promotional events results ==
=== Men's ===
1500 Metres
Place	Athlete	Nation	Time	Notes
1st place, gold medalist(s)	Cameron Myers	Australia	3:28.00	AR, WL
2nd place, silver medalist(s)	Azeddine Habz	France	3:29.80	SB
3rd place, bronze medalist(s)	Jake Wightman	Great Britain	3:29.95	SB
4	Anass Essayi	Morocco	3:30.17	PB
5	Reynold Cheruiyot	Kenya	3:30.28	SB
6	Anas Lagtiy Chaoudar	France	3:30.31	
7	Paul Anselmini	France	3:31.36	PB
8	Titouan Le Grix	France	3:31.46	PB
9	Flavien Szot	France	3:31.81	SB
10	Narve Gilje Nordås	Norway	3:32.05	
11	Fouad Messaoudi	Morocco	3:32.40	
12	Stefan Nillessen	Netherlands	3:32.45	SB
13	Abel Kipsang	Kenya	3:33.52	SB
14	Vincent Ciattei	United States	3:36.47	
15	Andrew Coscoran	Ireland	3:46.91	
—	Mounir Akbache	France	DNF	PM
—	Žan Rudolf	Slovenia	DNF	PM

=== Mixed ===
Mixed 4x100 Metres Relay
Place	Athletes	Nation	Time	Notes
1st place, gold medalist(s)	Ylann Bizasene; Chloé Galet; Théo Schaub; Sarah Richard	France	40.99	MR
2nd place, silver medalist(s)	Filippo Randazzo; Alessia Pavese; Lorenzo Ianes; Gloria Hooper	Italy	41.04	
3rd place, bronze medalist(s)	Calab Law; Zara Hagan; Christopher Ius; Torrie Lewis	Australia	41.09	
4	Elvis Afrifa; Minke Bisschops; Jozuah Revierre; Isabel van den Berg	Netherlands	41.20	
5	Valentijn Hoornaert; Janie De Naeyer; Antoine Snyders; Delphine Nkansa	Belgium	41.21	
6	Victor Girault; Vanessa Lokuli; Dejan Ottou; Nina Thevenin	France	42.17	
—	Heiko Gussmann; Gina Lückenkemper; Robin Ganter; Rebekka Haase	Germany	DQ	

== See also ==
- 2026 Diamond League
