= Demisha Roswell =

Jamaican athlete

Personal information
- Born: 19 June 1998 (age 28) Kingston, Jamaica

Sport
- Country: Jamaica
- Sport: Athletics
- Event: Sprint Hurdles
- College team: Texas Tech Lady Raiders
- Club: Pelicans Track Club
- Coached by: Fitz Coleman

Achievements and titles
- Personal bests: 100mH: 12.40 (2026); 60mH: 7.92 (2023)

Demisha Roswell (born 19 June 1998) is a Jamaican hurdler. She won the 110 metres hurdles title at the Jamaican Athletics Championships in 2026.

== Biography ==
Roswell attended Vere Technical High School in Clarendon, Jamaica, then New Mexico Junior College and Texas Tech University in the United States.

== Career ==
In May 2022, Roswell ran a personal best of 12.44 seconds for the 100 metres hurdles. She was named as a reserve for the Jamaican team at the 2022 World Championships.

In March 2023, she ran a personal best in the 60 metres hurdles of 7.92 seconds, and went on to place fifth at the 2023 NCAA Indoor Championships.

== 2026 ==
In February 2026, Roswell won the women's 60m hurdles at the Charlie Thomas Invitational in Texas ahead of Jaiya Covington, running 8.09 seconds in the final, having broken the meet record in the preliminary round with a run of 8.02 seconds. On 6 June, she ran won in 12.53 seconds from Ackera Nugent and Rayniah Jones for the 100 m hurdles at the 2026 USATF Lone Star Grand Prix in College Station, Texas. On 21 June, she ran a new personal best time of 12.40 seconds (+0.7 m/s) to win her first senior national title at the Jamaican Athletics Championships. The time moved her to joint-fifth place on the Jamaican all-time list alongside Janeek Brown. Roswell placed seventh overall competing in the 2026 Diamond League on 28 June at the 2026 Meeting de Paris.

Roswell was issued an official public apology from the Jamaica Athletics Administrative Association (JAAA) after she was excluded from the initial list of competitors for the 2026 Commonwealth Games. On 16 July, she won the 100 m hurdles at Spitzen Leichtathletik Luzern in Switzerland. She was called up for her senior Jamaica team debut for the 2026 Central American and Caribbean Games. In September, she competed in the 100 m hurdles at the inaugural World Ultimate Championship in Budapest.
