= 2025 World Athletics Indoor Championships – Men's 60 metres hurdles =

Men's 60 metres hurdles at the 2025 World Athletics Indoor Championships
- Venue: Nanjing's Cube at Nanjing Youth Olympic Sports Park
- Location: Nanjing, China
- Dates: 22 March
- Winning time: 7.42

Medalists
gold medal	Grant Holloway	United States
silver medal	Wilhem Belocian	France
bronze medal	Liu Junxi	China

The men's 60 metres hurdles at the 2025 World Athletics Indoor Championships took place on the short track of the Nanjing's Cube at Nanjing Youth Olympic Sports Park in Nanjing, China, on 22 March 2025. This was the 21st time the event was contested at the World Athletics Indoor Championships. Athletes could qualify by achieving the entry standard or by their World Athletics Ranking in the event.

The heats took place on 22 March during the morning session. The semi-finals and the final took place on 22 March during the evening session.

== Background ==
The men's 60 metres hurdles was contested 20 times before 2025, at every previous edition of the World Athletics Indoor Championships.

Records before the 2025 World Athletics Indoor Championships
Record	Athlete (nation)	Time (s)	Location	Date
World record	Grant Holloway (USA)	7.27	Albuquerque, United States	16 February 2024
Championship record	Grant Holloway (USA)	7.29	Belgrade, Serbia	20 March 2022
Championship record	Grant Holloway (USA)	7.29	Glasgow, United Kingdom	2 March 2024
World leading	Grant Holloway (USA)	7.36	Virginia Beach, United States	14 March 2025

== Qualification ==
For the men's 60 metres hurdles, the qualification period ran from 1 September 2024 until 9 March 2025. Athletes qualified by achieving the entry standards of 7.57 s. Athletes could also qualify by virtue of their World Athletics Ranking for the event or by virtue of their World Athletics Indoor Tour wildcard. There was a target number of 48 athletes.

== Results ==
=== Heats ===
The heats were held on 22 March, starting at 10:25 (UTC+8) in the morning. First 4 of each heat (Q) plus 4 fastest times (q) qualified for the semi-finals.

==== Heat 1 ====
Place	Lane	Athlete	Nation	Time	Notes
1	3	Qin Weibo	China	7.64	Q
2	5	Michael Obasuyi	Belgium	7.67	Q
3	8	Demario Prince	Jamaica	7.70	Q
4	2	Richard Diawara	Mali	7.79	Q, SB
5	4	Abdel Kader Larrinaga	Portugal	7.81	q
6	7	Yousuf Badawy Sayed	Egypt	7.99	
7	6	Dániel Eszes	Hungary	8.07	

==== Heat 2 ====
Place	Lane	Athlete	Nation	Time	Notes
1	7	Grant Holloway	United States	7.49	Q
2	4	Wilhem Belocian	France	7.58	Q
3	3	Krzysztof Kiljan	Poland	7.71	Q
4	2	Oumar Doudai Abakar	Qatar	7.75	Q
5	6	Tetsuro Nishi	Japan	7.79	q
6	5	Mikdat Sevler	Turkey	7.84	q

==== Heat 3 ====
Place	Lane	Athlete	Nation	Time	Notes
1	4	Lorenzo Simonelli	Italy	7.61 [.609]	Q
2	5	Jerome Campbell	Jamaica	7.61 [.610]	Q
3	6	Rafael Pereira	Brazil	7.65	Q
4	7	Bálint Szeles	Hungary	7.89	Q
—	3	Yaqoub Al-Youha	Kuwait	DNF	
—	2	Jonáš Kolomaznik	Czech Republic	DQ	

==== Heat 4 ====
Place	Lane	Athlete	Nation	Time	Notes
1	6	Cameron Murray	United States	7.68	Q
2	2	Eduardo Rodrigues	Brazil	7.75	Q
3	4	Alin Anton	Romania	7.85 [.844]	Q
3	8	Pascal Martinot-Lagarde	France	7.85 [.844]	Q
5	5	Kaweesha Bandara	Sri Lanka	7.87	q
6	7	Filip Jakob Demšar	Slovenia	7.89	
7	3	Luka Trgovčević	Serbia	8.10	

==== Heat 5 ====
Place	Lane	Athlete	Nation	Time	Notes
1	4	Jakub Szymański	Poland	7.55	Q
7	6	Liu Junxi	China	7.64	Q
3	2	Jeremie Lararaudeuse	Mauritius	7.72	Q
4	5	Nikkolia Kennedy	Barbados	7.89 [.881]	Q
5	8	Nicolò Giacalone	Italy	7.89 [.890]	
6	7	Saguirou Badamassi	Niger	7.97	
7	1	Yaqoub Alyouha	Kuwait	8.50	
8	3	Alexander Männel	Paraguay	8.51	

=== Semi-finals ===
The semi-finals were held on 22 March, starting at 19:50 (UTC+8).

==== Heat 1 ====
Place	Lane	Athlete	Nation	Time	Notes
1	6	Demario Prince	Jamaica	7.60 [.592]	Q
2	4	Qin Weibo	China	7.60 [.595]	Q
3	3	Jakub Szymański	Poland	7.63	
4	7	Oumar Doudai Abakar	Qatar	7.66	NR
5	2	Jeremie Lararaudeuse	Mauritius	7.77	
6	8	Mikdat Sevler	Turkey	7.81	
7	1	Bálint Szeles	Hungary	7.89	
—	5	Cameron Murray	United States	DQ	TR22.6.2[K]

==== Heat 2 ====
Place	Lane	Athlete	Nation	Time	Notes
1	6	Liu Junxi	China	7.51	Q
2	3	Lorenzo Simonelli	Italy	7.55	Q, SB
3	5	Michael Obasuyi	Belgium	7.61	q
4	2	Pascal Martinot-Lagarde	France	7.69	
5	7	Alin Anton	Romania	7.77	
6	8	Tetsuro Nishi	Japan	7.83	
7	1	Abdel Kader Larrinaga	Portugal	7.84	
8	4	Eduardo Rodrigues	Brazil	7.85	

==== Heat 3 ====
Place	Lane	Athlete	Nation	Time	Notes
1	4	Grant Holloway	United States	7.48	Q
2	6	Wilhem Belocian	France	7.51	Q
3	5	Jerome Campbell	Jamaica	7.61	q
4	3	Rafael Pereira	Brazil	7.67	
5	7	Krzysztof Kiljan	Poland	7.68	
6	2	Richard Diawara	Mali	7.79	SB
7	8	Kaweesha Bandara	Sri Lanka	74.33	
—	1	Nikkolia Kennedy	Barbados	DNF	

=== Final ===
The final was held on 22 March, starting at 21:05 (UTC+8).

Place	Lane	Athlete	Nation	Time	Notes
1st place, gold medalist(s)	6	Grant Holloway	United States	7.42	
2nd place, silver medalist(s)	5	Wilhem Belocian	France	7.54	
3rd place, bronze medalist(s)	3	Liu Junxi	China	7.55	
4	2	Lorenzo Simonelli	Italy	7.60 [.592]	
5	1	Michael Obasuyi	Belgium	7.60 [.593]	
6	4	Demario Prince	Jamaica	7.63	
7	8	Jerome Campbell	Jamaica	7.71	
8	7	Qin Weibo	China	7.72	
