= Tatsuki Abe =

Japanese athlete (born 2003)

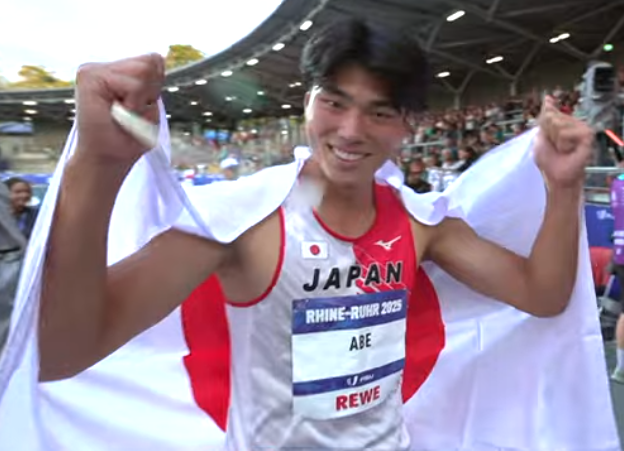
- Abe at the 2025 World University Games

Personal information
- Born: 3 August 2003 (age 23)

Sport
- Sport: Athletics
- Event: Hurdles
Medal record
Men's athletics
Representing Japan
Summer World University Games
Gold medal – first place	2025 Bochum	110m hurdles

Tatsuki Abe (born 4 August 2003) is a Japanese hurdler. He won the 110 metres hurdles gold medal at the 2025 Summer World University Games.

== Biography ==
A student at Juntendo University, Abe won the gold medal in the 110 metres hurdles at the 2025 Summer World University Games in Bochum, Germany in July 2025. That month, he won 110 m hurdles at the ISTAF Berlin as he ran 13.23 seconds to beat former Olympic champion Hansle Parchment of Jamaica. In August 2025, he ran a personal best of 13.12 seconds at the Athlete Night Games in Fukui. In Beijing the following month at the World Athletics Continental Tour Gold meeting, he ran 13.22 (+1.0m/s) to beat Xu Zhuoyi in a photo finish.

In May 2026, he ran 13.26 to win the 110 metres hurdles at the Golden Grand Prix in Tokyo ahead of Connor Schulman of the United States. In June, he was runner-up in 13.28 seconds in the final of the Japanese Championships. In July, he was runner-up to Enzo Diessl in the 110m hurdles at the TIPOS P-T-S Meeting in Banská Bystrica, Slovakia, with a time of 13.32 seconds. Competing at the 2026 Athletissima in Lausanne, Switzerland on 21 August 2026, he placed fifth in the 110 m hurdles. In September, he competed in the 110 m hurdles at the inaugural World Ultimate Championship in Budapest, qualifying for the final and placing fifth overall.
