= Zeno Van Neygen =

Belgian hurdler (born 2005)

Personal information
- Born: 21 October 2005 (age 20)

Sport
- Sport: Athletics
- Event: Hurdles

Achievements and titles
- Personal bests: 60mH: 7.60 (2026); 100mH: 13.41 (2026)
Medal record
Men's athletics
Representing Belgium
European U23 Championships
Silver medal – second place	2025 Bergen	110m hurdles

Zeno Van Neygen (born 21 October 2005) is a Belgian sprint hurdler. He won the 2026 Belgian Indoor Athletics Championships in the 60 metres hurdles. He was a silver medalist in the 110 metres hurdles at the 2025 European Athletics U23 Championships.

== Biography ==
From Dilbeek in the Flemish Brabant, Van Neygen is a member of Dilbeek Athletics Club (DAC). In August 2024, he placed second behind Briton Daniel Goriola in his heat at the 2024 World Athletics U20 Championships in Lima, Peru, but had to withdraw from the semi-final with injury. In May 2025, van Neygen ran a personal best 13.60 seconds at the Flanders Cup in Lokeren.

Van Neygen was a silver medalist in the 110 metres hurdles at the 2025 European Athletics U23 Championships in Bergen, Norway as a 19-year-old, running a personal best 13.54 seconds behind Enzo Diessl of Austria, with compatriot Elie Bacari winning the bronze medal. He set a new personal best of 13.43 seconds placing second behind Bacari at the senior Belgian Athletics Championships in August 2025. He backed-up that performance the following weekend with 13.53 second at the IFAM in Oordegem.

Having missed the previous indoor season, van Neygen made his debut at the senior height in the 60 metres hurdles in Luxembourg in 2026. He went on to set a personal best for the 60 metres hurdles of 7.64 seconds in Ostrava at the Czech Indoor Gala in February 2026. On 1 March, he won the 60 metres hurdles at the 2026 Belgian Indoor Athletics Championships in Louvain-La-Neuve, finishing ahead of Michael Obasuyi, and running a new personal best 7.60 seconds. In August 2026, he ran in the men's 110 metres hurdles at the 2026 European Athletics Championships in Birmingham, England, reaching the semi-finals and running a personal best of 13.41 seconds.

== Personal life ==
He studied computer science at the Erasmus Brussels University of Applied Sciences and Arts.
