= Romain Lecoeur =

French hurdler (born 1997)

Personal information
- Born: 9 August 1997 (age 29) Rouen, France
- Height: 188 cm (6 ft 2 in)
- Weight: 88 kg (194 lb)

Sport
- Country: France
- Sport: Athletics
- Event: Hurdles
- Club: Stade Sottevillais 76
- Coached by: Giscard Samba-Koundy

Achievements and titles
- Personal bests: 60mH: 7.51 (2026); 100mH: 13.31 (2025)

Romain Lecoeur (born 9 August 1997) is a French sprint hurdler. He represented France in the 110 metres hurdles at the 2024 European Athletics Championships.

== Biography ==
From Rouen, Normandy, he is a member of Stade Sottevillais. In 2016, he was runner-up in the 60 metres hurdles at the French Junior Indoor Championships.

In June 2024, he competed for France at the 2024 European Athletics Championships in Rome, Italy, reaching the semi-finals of the 110 metres hurdles, where he placed third in 13.47 seconds, without advancing to the final. Later that month, he placed third behind Sasha Zhoya and Erwann Cinna at the 2024 French Athletics Championships in Angers, running 13.53 seconds.

Representing France at the 2025 European Athletics Team Championships in Madrid, Spain, in June 2025, he ran 13.44 seconds to place sixth. In July 2025, he ran 13.37 seconds for the 110m hurdles to finish behind Ja'Kobe Tharp. Placing fourth in the 110m hurdles at the 2025 French Championships in Talence the following month, he ran a personal best of 13.31 seconds. He placed eighth at the 2025 Kamila Skolimowska Memorial, a 2025 Diamond League event in Silesia, Poland, in the 110 metres hurdles on 16 August.

In January 2026, he ran 7.63 seconds for the 60 metres hurdles at the Meeting de Paris. Lecoeur placed third behind Wilhem Belocian and Lecoeur's training partner Just Kwaou-Mathey in the 60 metres hurdles at the 2026 French Indoor Athletics Championships in Aubiere, where he ran a personal best of 7.51 seconds. The time met the automatic standard for the 2026 World Indoors, with Kwaou-Mathey opting out of the competition to focus on the outdoor season. In March 2026, he was a semi-finalist over 60 metres hurdles at the 2026 World Athletics Indoor Championships. On 19 June, he placed sixth in the 110 metres hurdles at the 2026 Doha Diamond League.
