= 2026 World Athletics Ultimate Championship – Women's 100 metres hurdles =

Women's 100 metres hurdles at the 2026 World Athletics Ultimate Championship
- Venue: National Athletics Centre
- Location: Budapest, Hungary
- Dates: 11 September 2026 (semi-finals & final)
- Competitors: 16 from 9 nations
- Winning time: 12.22 s

Champion
- Masai Russell; United States

The women's 100 metres hurdles was held over two rounds at the 2026 World Athletics Ultimate Championship at the National Athletics Centre in Budapest, Hungary on 11 September 2026. It was the first time the World Ultimate Championship is held. Athletes qualified by wildcard or by their world ranking.

== Background ==
Global records before the 2026 World Athletics Ultimate Championship
Record	Time	Athlete (nation)	Location	Date
World record	12.12	Tobi Amusan (NGR)	Eugene, United States	24 July 2022
World record	12.09 (Note: Awaiting ratification as the world record.)	Masai Russell (USA)	Zurich, Switzerland	27 August 2026
World lead	12.09	Masai Russell (USA)	Zurich, Switzerland	27 August 2026

Area records before the 2026 World Athletics Ultimate Championship
Record	Time	Athlete (nation)	Location	Date
African record	12.12	Tobi Amusan (NGR)	Eugene, United States	24 July 2022
Asian record	12.44	Olga Shishigina (KAZ)	Luzern, Switzerland	27 June 1995
European record	12.21	Yordanka Donkova (BUL)	Stara Zagora, Bulgaria	20 August 1988
North, Central American, and Caribbean record	12.09	Masai Russell (USA)	Zurich, Switzerland	27 August 2026
Oceanian record	12.28	Sally Pearson (AUS)	Daegu, South Korea	3 September 2011
South American record	12.49	Maribel Caicedo (ECU)	Fayetteville, United States	23 May 2024

== Qualification ==
For the 100 metres hurdles, sixteen athletes qualified, up to three by wildcard for winners of the event at the 2024 Summer Olympic, the 2025 World Athletics Championships, or the 2026 Diamond League final and the others by their position at the World Athletics Rankings for the event on 3 September 2026.

== Results ==
=== Semi-finals ===
The semi-finals were held on 11 September at 20:21 (UTC+2). First 4 of each heat (Q) qualified to the final.

==== Heat 1 ====
Place	Lane	Athlete	Nation	Time	Notes
1	5	Masai Russell	United States	12.38	Q
2	6	Nadine Visser	Netherlands	12.49	Q
3	7	Alaysha Johnson	United States	12.50	Q
4	4	Megan Simmonds	Jamaica	12.54 [.532]	Q
5	8	Rayniah Jones	United States	12.54 [.537]	
6	2	Luca Kozák	Hungary	12.68	
7	3	Ackera Nugent	Jamaica	12.81	
8	9	Laëticia Bapté	France	12.96	
				Wind: (+0.9 m/s)	

==== Heat 2 ====
Place	Lane	Athlete	Nation	Time	Notes
1	5	Devynne Charlton	Bahamas	12.45	Q
2	7	Tobi Amusan	Nigeria	12.49	Q
3	4	Pia Skrzyszowska	Poland	12.62	Q
4	3	Alia Armstrong	United States	12.65	Q
5	6	Danielle Williams	Jamaica	12.72	
6	2	Marione Fourie	South Africa	12.84	
7	9	Kendra Harrison	United States	12.88	
8	8	Demisha Roswell	Jamaica	13.04	
				Wind: (−0.2 m/s)	

=== Final ===
The final was held on 11 September at 21:49 (UTC+2).

Place	Lane	Athlete	Nation	Time	Notes
1st place, gold medalist(s)	7	Masai Russell	United States	12.22	
2	4	Tobi Amusan	Nigeria	12.34	
3	5	Nadine Visser	Netherlands	12.39	
4	6	Devynne Charlton	Bahamas	12.40	
5	2	Megan Simmonds	Jamaica	12.42	SB
6	3	Alaysha Johnson	United States	12.46	
7	8	Pia Skrzyszowska	Poland	12.52	
8	9	Alia Armstrong	United States	12.77	
				Wind: (+0.1 m/s)	
