= Elie Bacari =

Belgian athlete (born 2003)

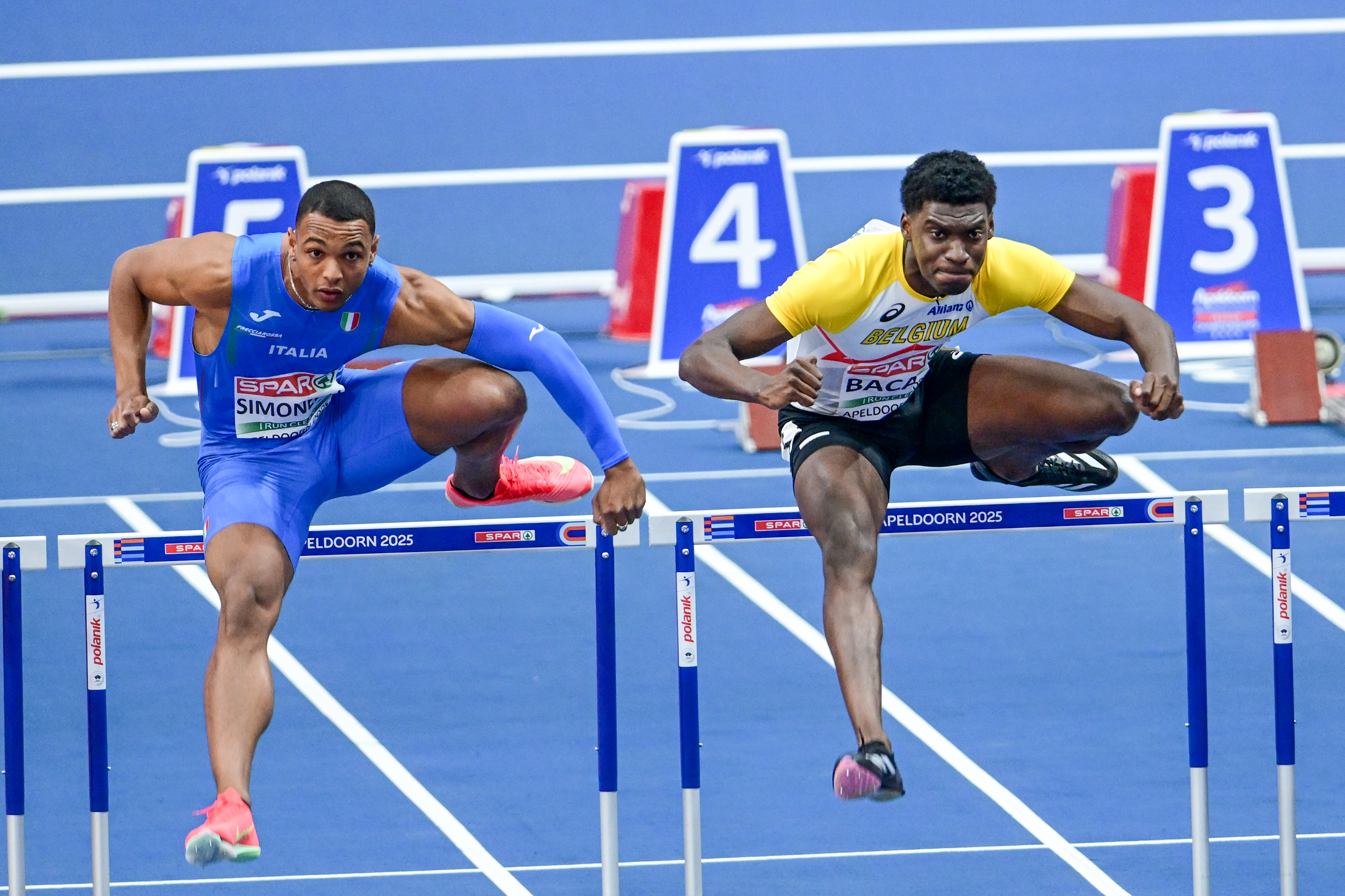
- Bacari in 2025

Personal information
- Nationality: Belgian
- Born: 14 October 2003 (age 22) Treichville, Côte d'Ivoire

Sport
- Sport: Athletics
- Event: Hurdles
- Coached by: Arne Broeders and Bart Bennema

Achievements and titles
- Personal bests: 60m hurdles: 7.50 (Luxemburg, 2026) NR; 110m hurdles: 13.25 (Kessel-Lo, 2026)
Medal record
Men's athletics
Representing Belgium
European U23 Championships
Bronze medal – third place	2025 Bergen	110m hurdles

Elie Bacari (born 14 October 2003) is a Belgian hurdler. He has represented Belgium at multiple major championships, including in the 110 metres hurdles at the 2024 Olympic Games and 2025 World Athletics Championships.

== Biography ==
Bacari was born in Ivory Coast and moved with his family to Belgium at the age of 6. Bacari started out as footballer but switched to athletics after having seen his sister perform in it. He first tried his hand at the decathlon. In this discipline, he posted a PB of 7080 points in 2022, qualifying for the 2022 World Athletics U20 Championships in Cali, Colombia. In those Championships, he ended in 20th position, not having finished the final 1500m due to injury. After the 2023 European Athletics U23 Championships in Espoo, Finland, where he participated only in the 110 metres hurdles and just missed out on the finals, Bacari decide to drop the decathlon and to focus from then on exclusively on the high hurdles.

Bacari lowered his 60m hurdles personal best a number of times in January 2024, and ran 7.62 seconds in Luxembourg to place fourth all-time for a Belgian athlete. He won a silver medal in the Belgian National Indoor Championships in February 2024. He competed in the 60m hurdles at the 2024 World Athletics Indoor Championships in Glasgow, running a personal best 7.58 seconds in the semi final.

He reached the final of the 110m hurdles at the 2024 European Athletics Championships in Rome. He ran a personal best 13.38 seconds for the 110m hurdles in Turku in June 2024. That month, he finished as runner-up at the Belgian Athletics Championships. He qualified for the 2024 Summer Olympics in Paris, France via the World Athletics Rankings. He was eliminated in the repechages.

In January 2025, he broke Belgium's national record in the 60m hurdles at the 2025 World Athletics Indoor Tour meeting in Luxemburg. He won the bronze medal in the 110 metres hurdles at the 2025 European Athletics U23 Championships, running 13.56 (-1.8 m/s) in Bergen, Norway in July 2025, finished behind Enzo Diessl of Austria and compatriot Zeno van Neygen.

He competed at the 2025 World Athletics Championships in the men's 110 metres hurdles in Tokyo, Japan, in September 2025, without advancing to the semi-finals.

On 18 January 2026, he equalled and then broke his own Belgian national record for the 60 metres hurdles, running 7.51 and 7.50 seconds in consecutive races in Luxembourg. In early March, he was a finalist at the 2026 Belgian Indoor Athletics Championships, but had to withdraw with an injury that also forced him out of the 2026 World Athletics Indoor Championships in Toruń, Poland later than month. In July, having recovered from injury, Bacari ran a personal best of 13.25 at the 2026 Belgian national championships. Starting out as a medal contender at the 2026 European Athletics Championships in Birmingham, England, Bacari saw his hopes disappear in dramatic fashion, crashing out at the seventh hurdle while leading heat 2. At the 2026 Diamond League Final in Brussels in September, he placed fifth in the 110 metres hurdles.
