= Jerome Campbell =

Jamaican athlete (born 2002)

Personal information
- Nationality: Jamaican
- Born: 20 November 2002 (age 23)

Sport
- Country: Jamaica
- Sport: Athletics
- Event: Hurdles

Achievements and titles
- Personal bests: 60m hurdles 7.48 (2026); 110m hurdles: 13.30 (2024)
Medal record
NACAC U18 Championships
Gold medal – first place	2019 Querétaro	4 x 100 m relay
Silver medal – second place	2019 Querétaro	110 m hurdles

Jerome Campbell (born 20 November 2002) is a Jamaican sprint hurdler.

== Early life ==
He attended Calabar High School in Kingston, Jamaica, prior to studying in the United States at the University of Northern Colorado.

== Career ==
Campbell competed for the Northern Colorado Bears track and field team in the NCAA. In February 2025, he lowered his personal best for the 60 metres hurdles to 7.55 seconds whilst running in Fayetteville, Arkansas.

He ran a personal best 7.54 seconds in the premieres, and then lowered it to 7.49 seconds for the 60m hurdles to finish second at the 2025 NCAA Indoor Championships in Virginia Beach on 15 March 2025. The time moved him to joint third fastest on the all-time Jamaican list, equal with Ronald Levy, and behind only Omar McLeod and Maurice Wignall.

He was selected for the Jamaican team for the 2025 World Athletics Indoor Championships in Nanjing in March 2025, where he qualified for the final and placed seventh overall. Campbell placed fifth in the final of the 100m hurdles at the 2025 Jamaican Championships.

Campbell transferred to the Arkansas Razorbacks track and field team for the 2026 season. In February 2026, Campbell lowered his 60m hurdles personal best to 7.48 seconds at the Tyson Invitational in Arkansas. He was a semi-finalist representing Jamaica in the 60m hurdles at the 2026 World Athletics Indoor Championships in Toruń, Poland. On 21 June, Campbell was runner-up to Demario Prince in the 110 metres hurdles at the 2026 Jamaican Athletics Championships. He competed in the 110 metres hurdles at the 2026 Commonwealth Games in Glasgow, Scotland, qualifying for the final and placing sixth overall. He also ran in the men's 4 × 100 m relay.
