= Raphaël Mohamed =

French athlete (born 1998)

Personal information
- Nationality: French
- Born: 2 February 1998 (age 28) Saint-Paul, Réunion

Sport
- Sport: Athletics
- Event: Hurdles

Achievements and titles
- Personal bests: 60m hurdles: 7.68 (Miramas, 2025); 110m hurdles: 13.27 (Montgeron, 2024)

Raphaël Mohamed (born 2 February 1998) is a French hurdler. Born in Réunion, he started athletics at the age of sixteen and domestically represented the Mamoudzou Racing Club in Mamoudzou, Mayotte. He moved to mainland France to train and eventually met the qualifying standard for the 2024 Summer Olympics.

Mohamed's first appearance for the French national team was at the 2024 European Athletics Championships in the men's 110 metres hurdles; there he placed fourth. Eventually, he competed at the 2024 Summer Olympics in the same event, reaching the semifinals before being eliminated.

== Biography ==
Raphaël Mohamed was born on 2 February 1998 in Réunion. Mohamed started athletics at the age of sixteen and upon winning a cross-country race in his school, he was given an athlete license by his coach Philippe Pichereau and regularly competed in the island. Apart from his family in Réunion, he has family in Hagnoundrou on the island of Mayotte. Domestically, he represented the Mamoudzou Racing Club in Mamoudzou based in Mayotte.

He later moved to mainland France at the age of 21 at the suggestion of his former coach Cédric Lopez. There, he was trained by Fabien Lambolez alongside two-time European Championship medalist Just Kwaou-Mathey.

During his career, he lowered his personal best twice in Montgeron in May 2024, improving it to 13.27 seconds. This time also met the qualifying standard for the 2024 Paris Olympics. After setting that mark, he was selected for his first appearance at the French national team, competing at the 2024 European Athletics Championships in the men's 110 metres hurdles. There, he qualified for the final of the event and finished fourth overall with a time of 13.45 seconds. The following year, he competed at the 2024 Summer Olympics representing France. He competed in the men's 110 metres hurdles, reaching the semifinals.
