= Sam Bennett (hurdler) =

British athlete

Personal information
- Full name: Samuel Morrison Bennett
- Nationality: British
- Born: 2 February 2001 (age 25) Southend, England

Sport
- Sport: Athletics
- Event: Hurdles

Achievements and titles
- Personal bests: 60mH: 7.66 (2025); 110mH: 13.26 (2026)
Medal record
Men's athletics
Representing Great Britain
European U18 Championships
Gold medal – first place	2018 Győr	110m hurdles
Representing England
Commonwealth Games
Silver medal – second place	2026 Glasgow	110m hurdles
Commonwealth Youth Games
Gold medal – first place	2017 Nassau	110m hurdles

Samuel Morrison Bennett (born 2 February 2001) is a British hurdler. He won the 110 metres hurdles at the 2026 UK Athletics Championships and the silver medal at the 2026 Commonwealth Games.

Bennett was a gold medalist at the 2018 European U18 Championships and 2017 Commonwealth Youth Games. As a senior, he placed second at the 2024 British Athletics Championships, and third at the 2023 and 2025 UK Athletics Championships.

== Early and personal life ==
From Essex, Bennett was educated at Southend High School for Boys. He represented England in international competition for the first time in 2016. Bennett trained as a member of Basildon Athletics Club under Steve Surety before spending six years competing in the American collegiate system from 2019, studying for four years at Harvard University before moving to Howard University in 2023 and then Texas Tech University in 2024.

== Career ==
A successful junior racer, Bennett won the gold medal over 100 metres hurdles at the 2017 Commonwealth Youth Games in Nassau, Bahamas and won the England Athletics Championships’ under-17 men’s 100m hurdles final. He won the gold medal at the 2018 European Athletics U18 Championships in the 110 metres hurdles, in Győr. Bennett was inducted into the 2019 British Athletics Futures Academy programme.

In July 2023, he placed third at the 2023 British Athletics Championships in Manchester, with a wind assisted 13.46 seconds (+3.2) for the 110 metres hurdles.

Bennett was second to Daniel Goriola in the 110 metres hurdles at the 2024 British Athletics Championships in Manchester, running 13.56 seconds.

In 2025, he placed third over 110 metres hurdles at the 2025 UK Athletics Championships in Birmingham, in August 2025, in a time of 13.87 seconds. However, a cruciate knee ligament injury at the end of 2025 caused him to miss significant race time.

In June 2026, Bennett ran within 0.01 seconds of his personal best with a win in 13.46 (+1.6) at the Gouden Spike in Leiden. That month, he won his first senior national title, winning the 110 metres hurdles final at the 2026 UK Athletics Championships in a new personal best 13.41 seconds (+0.4). He was selected to represent England at the 2026 Commonwealth Games in Glasgow. Bennett was the fastest qualifier for the final from the 110m hurdles heats, with a slightly wind-assisted run of 13.20 seconds (+2.1) before running a wind-legal new personal best of 13.30 seconds to win the silver medal in the final behind Demario Prince of Jamaica. Bennett was a finalist in the 110 m hurdles on 12 August at the 2026 European Athletics Championships, placing seventh overall. In the semi-final he ran a personal best time of 13.26 seconds to move to eighth on the UK all-time list. In October 2026, he was moved up to the confirmation level in the 2026-27 Olympic World Class Programme awarded by UK Athletics.
