= Athletics at the 2025 Summer World University Games – Men's 110 metres hurdles =

Men's 110 metres hurdles at the 2025 Summer World University Games
- Venue: Lohrheidestadion
- Location: Bochum, Germany
- Dates: 23 July (heats); 24 July (final)
- Competitors: 23 from 18 nations
- Winning time: 13.47

Medalists
gold medal	Tatsuki Abe	Japan
silver medal	Angel Díaz	Spain
bronze medal	Mondray Barnard	South Africa

The men's 110 metres hurdles event at the 2025 Summer World University Games was held in Bochum, Germany, at Lohrheidestadion on 23 and 24 July.

== Records ==
Prior to the competition, the records were as follows:

Record	Athlete (nation)	Time (s)	Location	Date
Games record	Alejandro Casañas (CUB)	13.21	Sofia, Bulgaria	21 August 1977

== Results ==
=== Heats ===
First 2 in each heat (Q) and the next 2 fastest (q) qualified for the final.

==== Heat 1 ====
Place	Athlete	Nation	Time	Notes
1	Tatsuki Abe	Japan	13.61	Q
2	Yi-Kai Lin	Chinese Taipei	13.71	Q
3	Filip Jakob Demšar	Slovenia	13.83	
4	Yousuf Badawy Sayed	Egypt	13.90	
5	Austin Little	Australia	14.05	
6	Andreas Christoffersen	Denmark	14.55	
7	Chin Seng Tam	Macau	14.89	PB
8	Rahil Sakeer	India	DQ	TR 16.8
			Wind: (+0.2 m/s)	

==== Heat 2 ====
Place	Athlete	Nation	Time	Notes
1	Colby Eddowes	Australia	13.65	Q
2	Franco le Roux	South Africa	13.71	Q
3	Chris Serrao	United States	13.80	q
4	Nolan Vancauwemberghe	Belgium	13.90	
5	Jakub Bujak	Poland	13.97	
6	Yuan-Kai Hsieh	Chinese Taipei	13.99	
7	Essa Abdullah Jarah	Saudi Arabia	14.66	
8	Mohamed Saer Diongue	Senegal	14.84	
			Wind: (+0.7 m/s)	

==== Heat 3 ====
Place	Athlete	Nation	Time	Notes
1	Angel Díaz	Spain	13.72 [.711]	Q
2	Mondray Barnard	South Africa	13.72 [.717]	Q
3	Hayato Higuchi	Japan	13.80	q
4	Olgierd Michniewski	Poland	13.92	
5	Franz Krull	Estonia	14.65	
6	Juan Manuel Apodaca	Ecuador	15.47	
—	Thomas Wilcock	Great Britain	DNF	
			Wind: (+0.5 m/s)	

=== Final ===
Place	Athlete	Nation	Time	Notes
1st place, gold medalist(s)	Tatsuki Abe	Japan	13.47	
2nd place, silver medalist(s)	Angel Díaz	Spain	13.59 [.583]	
3rd place, bronze medalist(s)	Mondray Barnard	South Africa	13.59 [.590]	
4	Chris Serrao	United States	13.64	
5	Colby Eddowes	Australia	13.69	
6	Yi-Kai Lin	Chinese Taipei	13.75	
7	Hayato Higuchi	Japan	13.90	
8	Franco le Roux	South Africa	14.85	
			Wind: (−0.3 m/s)	
