= Athletics at the 2026 Commonwealth Games – Men's 110 metres hurdles =

Men's 110 metres hurdles at the 2026 Commonwealth Games
- Venue: Scotstoun Stadium, Glasgow
- Dates: 27 July 2026 (Round 1 and final)
- Competitors: 15 from 12 nations
- Winning time: 13.17

Medalists
gold medal	Demario Prince	Jamaica
silver medal	Sam Bennett	England
bronze medal	Milan Trajković	Cyprus

The men's 110 metres hurdles at the 2026 Commonwealth Games, as part of the athletics programme, took place at the Scotstoun Stadium on 27 July 2026.

== Records ==
Prior to this competition, the existing world, Commonwealth and Commonwealth Games records were as follows:

Men's 110 m hurdles
World record	12.75	Ja'Kobe Tharp (USA)	10 Jun 2026	Eugene, United States
Commonwealth record	12.90	Omar McLeod (JAM)	24 Jun 2017	Kingston, Jamaica
Games record	13.08	Colin Jackson (WAL)	28 Jan 1990	Auckland New Zealand

== Schedule ==
The schedule is as follows:

Date	Time	Round
27 July 2026	11:25	Round 1
27 July 2026	21:45	Final

All times are United Kingdom time (UTC+1)

== Results ==
=== Round 1 ===
Round 1 was held on the morning of 27 July 2026.

==== Heat 1 ====
Place	Lane	Athlete	Nation	Time	Notes
1	6	Samuel Bennett	England	13.20	Q
2	5	Jerome Campbell	Jamaica	13.33	Q
3	7	Tejas Shirse	India	13.76	Q
4	3	Roshan Ranatunga	Sri Lanka	14.11	q
5	4	Robert Oa	Papua New Guinea	14.39	
6	8	Khailan Vitalis	Saint Lucia	14.46	
7	2	Errol Qaqa	Fiji	14.66	
—	1	Jérémie Lararaudeuse	Mauritius	DNF	
				Wind: (+2.1 m/s)	

==== Heat 2 ====
Place	Lane	Athlete	Nation	Time	Notes
1	5	Milan Trajkovic	Cyprus	13.21	Q
2	7	Demario Prince	Jamaica	13.27	Q
3	2	Tade Ojora	England	13.48	Q
4	4	Franco le Roux	South Africa	13.64	q
5	6	Philippe Djo Petitjean	Togo	14.38	
6	8	Oscar Smith	Bahamas	DNF	
—	3	Moses Koroma	Sierra Leone	DQ	TR16.8
				Wind: (+2.9 m/s)	

=== Final ===
The final took place in the evening of the 27 July 2026.

Place	Lane	Athlete	Nation	Time	Notes
1st place, gold medalist(s)	3	Demario Prince	Jamaica	13.17	
2nd place, silver medalist(s)	4	Samuel Bennett	England	13.30	PB
3rd place, bronze medalist(s)	5	Milan Trajkovic	Cyprus	13.32	SB
4	8	Franco le Roux	South Africa	13.53	
5	2	Tade Ojora	England	13.82	
6	6	Jerome Campbell	Jamaica	13.86	
7	1	Roshan Ranatunga	Sri Lanka	14.05	
8	7	Tejas Shirse	India	15.39	
				Wind: (+0.4 m/s)	
