= Thomas Wilkes (hurdler) =

French hurdler (born 2004)

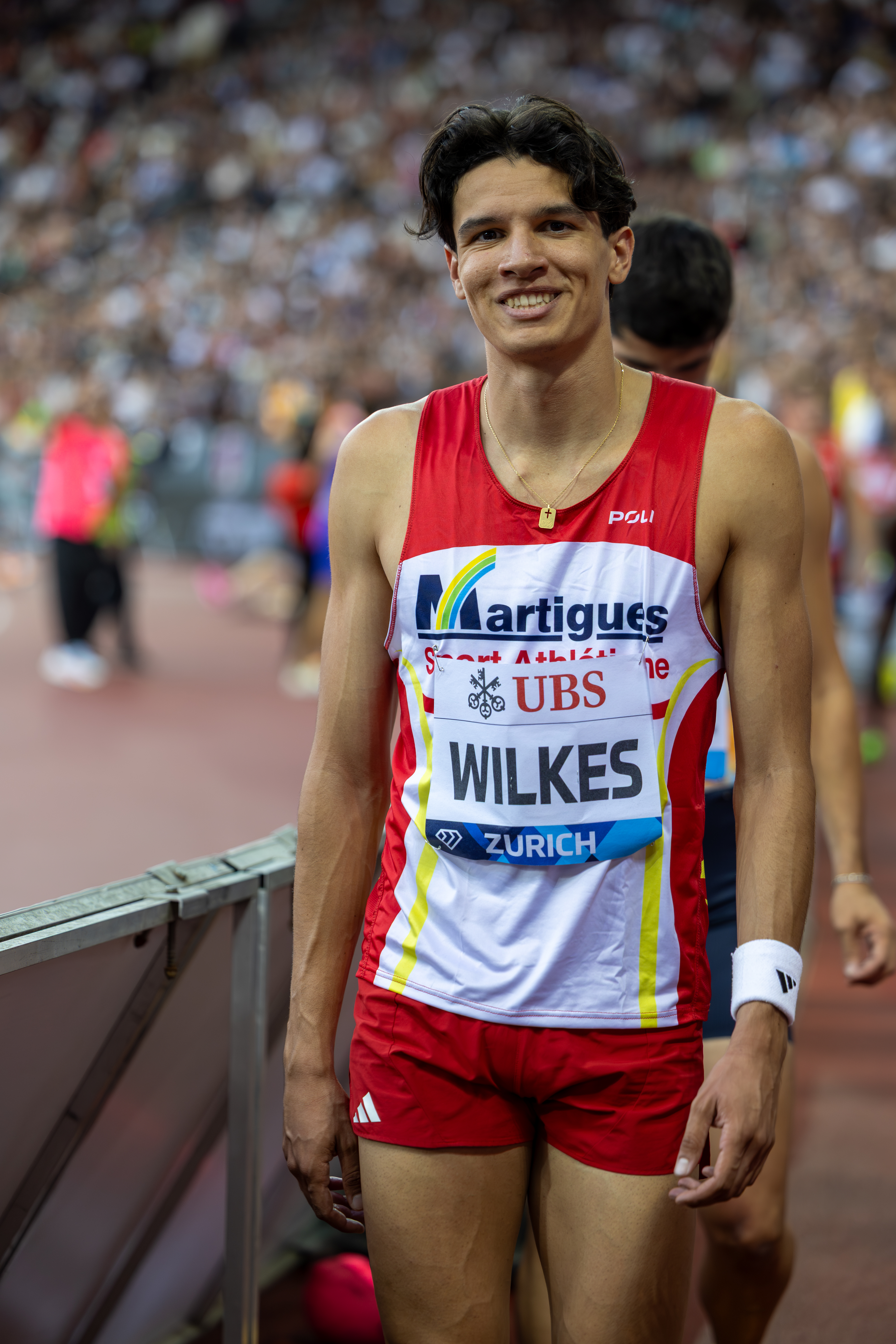
- Wilkes at the 2026 Weltklasse Zürich

Personal information
- Born: 16 May 2004 (age 22) Aix-en-Provence, France
- Height: 187 cm (6 ft 2 in)
- Weight: 77 kg (170 lb)

Sport
- Country: France
- Sport: Athletics
- Event: Hurdles

Achievements and titles
- Personal bests: 60mH: 7.71 (2026); 100mH: 13.27 (2026)
Medal record
Men's athletics
Representing France
Mediterranean Games
Bronze medal – third place	2026 Taranto	110 m hurdles

Thomas Wilkes (born 16 May 2004) is a French high hurdler. He placed fourth in the 110 metres hurdles at the 2026 European Athletics Championships.

== Biography ==
From Aix-en-Provence, he is a member of Martigues Sport Athlé, where he is coached by Franck Né. He suffered from repeated hamstrings injury in his junior years as an athlete.

Wilkes was a semi-finalist in the 110 metres hurdles at the 2025 European Athletics U23 Championships in Bergen, Norway in July. The following month, he ran a personal best 13.48 seconds at the French Championships where he was a finalist in the 110 metres hurdles in Talence.

Wilkes placed third in 13.43 seconds (+1.6) in the 110 m hurdles at the Irena Szewińska Memorial in Bydgoszcz, Poland, Kendry Menéndez and Jamal Britt. In May, he also ran a personal best of 13.38 seconds in an interclub competition in France. On 4 June, Wilkes placed fifth in the 110 metres hurdles at the 2026 Golden Gala in Rome, part of the 2026 Diamond League in a season's best 13.44 seconds. That month he also competed in the 2026 Doha Diamond League on 19 June, placing third behind World Champion Cordell Tinch and former European Champion Asier Martinez, with a new personal best 13.28 seconds from lane one. Wilkes ran a new personal best again with 13.27 seconds on 28 June at the 2026 Meeting de Paris. On 12 August, he competed in the final of the 110 m hurdles at the 2026 European Athletics Championships in Birmingham, England, placing fourth overall.
