= Alaysha Johnson =

American hurdler (born 1996)

Alaysha Johnson OLY
- At the 2026 Weltklasse Zürich

Personal information
- Born: July 20, 1996 (age 30)
- Home town: Spring, Texas, U.S.
- Education: University of Oregon '18; Texas Tech University '19
- Height: 165 cm (5 ft 5 in)

Sport
- Sport: Athletics
- Event: 100 metres hurdles
- Turned pro: 2019

Achievements and titles
- Olympic finals: 2024; 100 m hurdles, 7th
- Personal bests: 100 m hurdles: 12.31 (Eugene, 2024); 60 m hurdles 7.82 (Val-de-Reuil, 2023)
Medal record
Women's athletics
Representing the United States
Pan American Games
Bronze medal – third place	2023 Santiago	100 m hurdles
NACAC Championships
Gold medal – first place	2022 Freeport	100 metres hurdles

Alaysha Johnson OLY (born July 20, 1996) is an American hurdler. She competed at the 2024 Olympic Games in the 100 metres hurdles having placed second in the 2024 US Olympic trials. She finished third at the 2025 USA Outdoor Track and Field Championships.

== Biography ==
A student at the University of Oregon Johnson is studying for a master's degree in sociology. At high school she was on the debate team and was named the Texas Gatorade Track & Field Girls Athlete of the Year award as a high school junior in 2013.

Johnson was the runner up in the 60 m hurdles at the 2022 USA Indoor Track and Field Championships behind Gabbi Cunningham. Johnson was also runner up in the 100 m hurdles at the 2022 USA Outdoor Track and Field Championships, this time behind Kendra Harrison with Johnson running a personal best of 12.35 seconds. That time of 12.35 placed Johnson twelfth on the all time 100 metres hurdles list, worldwide. Consequent from this performance Johnson was selected for the American team to take part in the 2022 World Athletics Championships held in Eugene, Oregon. Unfortunately for Johnson, the 100 metre hurdle event did not go well for her as she was one of a number of athletes to crash out and be disqualified, including her compatriot and the defending world champion, Nia Ali.

She finished as runner-up in the 100 m hurdles at the LA Grand Prix in May 2024. The following month, finished second at the US Olympic Trials in a personal best time of 12.31 seconds to earn a place on the US team for the 2024 Paris Olympics. She subsequently competed in the 100 m hurdles at the 2024 Paris Olympics, reaching the final, where she placed seventh overall.

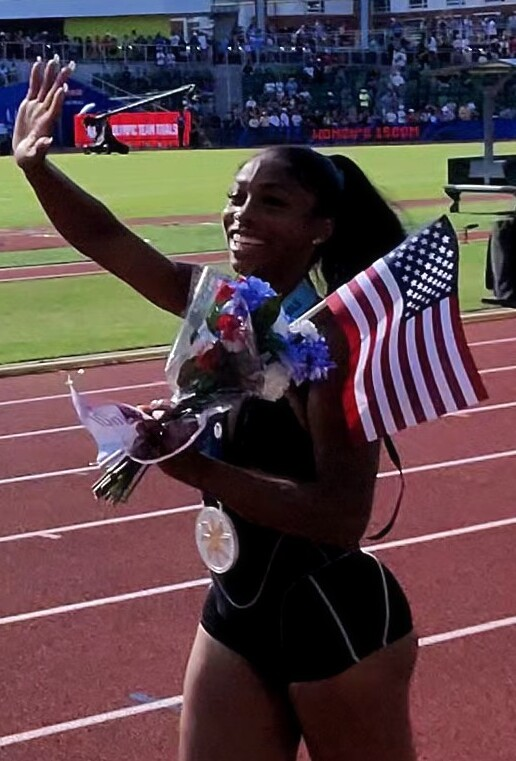
Johnson at the 2024 US Olympic Trials

Johnson competed in the 2025 Diamond League event at the 2025 Meeting de Paris in June 2025. On 2 August, she placed third in the final of the 100 metres hurdles at the 2025 USA Outdoor Track and Field Championships. She was a semi-finalist at the 2025 World Athletics Championships in Tokyo, Japan.

Johnson opened her 2026 indoor season competing in Europe, her performances including running 7.88 for the 60 metres hurdles at the Czech Golden Gala in Ostrava, and 7.85 at the Copernicus Cup in Toruń. Also in Poland, she ran 12.75 seconds for the 100m hurdles at the Irena Szewińska Memorial in May. Competing at the Boris Hanzekovic Memorial in Zagreb on 26 June, Johnson ran a meeting record in the 100m hurdles in 12.43 seconds in a photo finish from compatriot Rayniah Jones, who was credited with the same time. On 28 June, Johnson was third in 12.39 at the 2026 Meeting de Paris. On 10 July, Johnson was second in 12.38 seconds for the 100 m hurdles at the 2026 Herculis Diamond League event in Monaco. On 25 July, she placed second with 12.42 seconds at the 2026 USA Outdoor Track and Field Championships in New York. Returning to Europe, she placed third in the 100 m hurdles at the 2026 Athletissima in Lausanne, in 12.49 seconds on 21 August. In September, she was a finalist competing in the 100 m hurdles at the inaugural World Ultimate Championship in Budapest. On 18 September, she won the 100 m hurdles at Athlos in London.

== Statistics ==
=== Circuit performances ===
Grand Slam Track results
Slam	Race group	Event	Pl.	Time	Prize money
2025 Miami Slam	Short hurdles	100 m hurdles	6th	12.56	US$12,500
2025 Miami Slam	Short hurdles	100 m		DNS	US$12,500

=== International championships ===
Year	Competition	Venue	Position	Event	Notes
Representing United States
2022	NACAC Championships	Freeport, Bahamas	1st	100 m hurdles	12.62
2022	World Championships	Eugene, United States	–	100 m hurdles	DQ
2022	World Indoor Championships	Belgrade, Serbia	11th	60 m hurdles	8.02
2023	Pan American Games	Santiago, Chile	3rd	100 m hurdles	13.19
2024	Olympic Games	Paris, France	7th	100 m hurdles	12.93
2025	World Championships	Tokyo, Japan	10th (sf)	100 m hurdles	12.66
2026	World Ultimate Championship	Budapest, Hungary	6th	100 m hurdles	12.46

=== National championships ===
Year	Competition	Venue	Position	Event	Notes
2016	US Olympic Trials	Eugene, Oregon	11th	100 Meters Hurdles	13.02
2017	USA Outdoor Track and Field Championships	Sacramento, California	7th	100 Meters Hurdles	12.92
2018	USA Outdoor Track and Field Championships	Des Moines, Iowa	7th	100 Meters Hurdles	13.23
2019	USA Outdoor Track and Field Championships	Des Moines, Iowa	27th	100 Meters Hurdles	13.77
2022	USA Indoor Track and Field Championships	Spokane, Washington; The Podium	2nd	60 Meters Hurdles	7.91
2022	USA Outdoor Track and Field Championships	Eugene, Oregon	2nd	100 Meters Hurdles	12.35
2023	USA Indoor Track and Field Championships	Albuquerque, New Mexico	1st	60 Meters Hurdles	7.83
2023	USA Outdoor Track and Field Championships	Eugene, Oregon	4th	100 Meters Hurdles	12.46
2024	USA Indoor Track and Field Championships	Albuquerque, New Mexico	DQ	60 Meters Hurdles	N/A
2024	US Olympic Trials	Eugene, Oregon	2nd	100 Meters Hurdles	12.31

=== NCAA ===
Alaysha Johnson is a 8-time All-American, 2-time Pac-12 Conference Champion, 5-time All-Pac-12 Conference honoree, 3-time Big 12 Conference finalist & 3-time MPSF Indoor Track and Field Championships runner-up.
Johnson is #1 in Oregon Ducks Track and Field history in 100 m hurdles with her time of 12.69 seconds in 2017 and top 10 in the 400 m hurdles.
Johnson is #2 behind Sasha Wallace in Oregon Ducks Track and Field history in 60 m hurdles with her time of 8.01 seconds.

Year	Competition	Venue	Position	Event	Notes
Representing Texas Tech Red Raiders
2019	NCAA Division I Outdoor Track and Field Championships	University of Texas at Austin	10th	100 m hurdles	12.92
2019	NCAA Division I Outdoor Track and Field Championships	University of Texas at Austin	22nd	400 m hurdles	60.40
2019	Big 12 Conference Outdoor Track and Field Championships	University of Oklahoma	3rd	100 m hurdles	13.34
2019	Big 12 Conference Outdoor Track and Field Championships	University of Oklahoma	4th	4 × 100 meters relay	45.02
2019	Big 12 Conference Indoor Track and Field Championships	Texas A&M University	7th	60 meters hurdles	8.48
Representing Oregon Ducks
2018	NCAA Division I Outdoor Track and Field Championships	University of Oregon	7th	100 m hurdles	13.22
2018	NCAA Division I Outdoor Track and Field Championships	University of Oregon	2nd	4 × 100 meters relay	43.06
2018	Pac-12 Conference Outdoor Track and Field Championships	Stanford University	4th	100 m hurdles	13.02
2018	Pac-12 Conference Outdoor Track and Field Championships	Stanford University	2nd	4 × 100 meters relay	43.13
2018	Pac-12 Conference Outdoor Track and Field Championships	Stanford University	11th	200 meters	23.75
2018	NCAA Division I Indoor Track and Field Championships	Texas A&M University	14th	60 meters hurdles	8.20
2018	MPSF Indoor Track and Field Championships	University of Washington	2nd	60 meters hurdles	8.03
2017	NCAA Division I Outdoor Track and Field Championships	University of Oregon	4th	100 m hurdles	12.72
2017	Pac-12 Conference Outdoor Track and Field Championships	University of Oregon	1st	100 m hurdles	12.90
2017	Pac-12 Conference Outdoor Track and Field Championships	University of Oregon	1st	4 × 100 meters relay	42.81
2017	Pac-12 Conference Outdoor Track and Field Championships	University of Oregon	12th	200 meters	24.07
2017	NCAA Division I Indoor Track and Field Championships	Texas A&M University	8th	60 m hurdles	8.13
2017	MPSF Indoor Track and Field Championships	University of Washington	2nd	60 meters hurdles	8.03
2016	NCAA Division I Outdoor Track and Field Championships	University of Oregon	23rd	100 m hurdles	13.42
2016	NCAA Division I Outdoor Track and Field Championships	University of Oregon	24th	4 × 100 meters relay	DNF
2016	Pac-12 Conference Outdoor Track and Field Championships	University of Washington	3rd	100 m hurdles	13.34
2016	Pac-12 Conference Outdoor Track and Field Championships	University of Washington	10th	400 meters hurdles	60.99
2016	NCAA Division I Indoor Track and Field Championships	Birmingham CrossPlex; Birmingham, Alabama	3rd	4 × 400 meters relay	3:29.77
2016	NCAA Division I Indoor Track and Field Championships	Birmingham CrossPlex; Birmingham, Alabama	8th	60 meters hurdles	8.16
2016	MPSF Indoor Track and Field Championships	University of Washington	2nd	60 meters hurdles	8.17

=== Prep ===
Alaysha Johnson is the 2013 Gatorade Texas Track and Field Athlete of the Year, a 5-time high school All-American, 2012 Texas UIL 5A State Champion, 5-time University Interscholastic League state finalist. Johnson set Spring High School records in 100 hurdles – 13.98 & 300 hurdles - 41.24.

Year	Competition	Venue	Position	Event	Notes
Representing Track Houston Youth Track Club
2014	USATF Junior Olympic Track & Field Championships	Humble High School	2nd	4 × 100 meters relay	46.08
2013	USATF Junior Olympic Track & Field Championships	North Carolina A&T State University	8th	4 × 100 meters relay	46.81
2013	USATF Junior Olympic Track & Field Championships	North Carolina A&T State University	14th	200 meters	24.33
2013	USATF Junior Olympic Track & Field Championships	North Carolina A&T State University	5th	100 meters hurdles	14.15
2013	USATF Junior Olympic Track & Field Championships	North Carolina A&T State University	11th	4 × 400 meters relay	3:49.33
2012	AAU Junior Olympic Games	University of Houston	3rd	4 × 400 meters relay	3:48.98
2012	AAU Junior Olympic Games	University of Houston	3rd	4 × 100 meters relay	46.74
Representing Spring High School
2014	Texas UIL 5A State Championships	University of Texas at Austin	2nd	100 meters hurdles	13.59
2014	Texas UIL 5A State Championships	University of Texas at Austin	5th	300 meters hurdles	42.96
2012	Texas UIL 5A State Championships	University of Texas at Austin	2nd	100 meters hurdles	13.84
2012	Texas UIL 5A State Championships	University of Texas at Austin	1st	300 meters hurdles	41.83
2012	Texas UIL 5A State Championships	University of Texas at Austin	8th	4 × 100 meters relay	48.08
