= Liu Junxi =

Chinese hurdler (born 2003)

Personal information
- Native name: 刘俊茜
- Born: 11 December 2003 (age 22) Taizhou, Jiangsu, China

Sport
- Sport: Athletics
- Event(s): 60 metres hurdles 110 metres hurdles

Achievements and titles
- National finals: 2023 Chinese Champs; • 110m hurdles, 4th
- Personal best(s): 60mH: 7.58 (2024) 110mH: 13.24 (+0.3) (2025)
Medal record
Men's athletics
Representing China
World Indoor Championships
Bronze medal – third place	2025 Nanjing	60 m hurdles
Asian Championships
Silver medal – second place	2025 Gumi	110 m hurdles
Asian Indoor Championships
Gold medal – first place	2026 Tanjijn	60 m hurdles

Liu Junxi (Note: In this Chinese name, the family name is Liu.) (Chinese: 刘俊茜; born 11 December 2003) is a Chinese hurdler. He won a bronze medal at the World Indoor Championships and a silver at the Asian Championships, and has won several regional and international competitions.

== Career ==
Liu first represented China at the 2024 World Athletics Indoor Championships, where he qualified for the semifinals of the 60 m hurdles and finished 12th overall.

Liu won the 2024 Astana Indoor Meeting in a meeting record time of 7.58 for 60 metres hurdles. He also won the first leg of the Chinese Indoor Athletics Invitational Championships series.

In 2025, he won a bronze medal at the World Indoor Championships and a silver at the Asian Championships.

== Personal life ==
Liu was born in Taizhou, Jiangsu, China and he represents Jiangsu in Chinese national competition. He initially competed in the long jump at Jingjiang City Primary School, but was not particularly tall. He was accepted to the Taizhou City Sports School where he then began professional training.

He has been described as part of a new generation of Chinese hurdlers, and is frequently compared with Liu Xiang to the point that some Chinese commentators have asked, "Do people with the surname Liu run fast?".

== Statistics ==
=== Personal best progression ===
110m Hurdles progression
#	Mark	Pl.	Competition	Venue	Date	Ref.
1	14.47 (+0.1 m/s)	(bronze) (Heat 2)	Yangtze River Delta Elite Meeting	Shaoxing, China	7 Apr 2021	
2	14.01 (−0.6 m/s)	(gold) (Heat 1)	CAA Training Base Permit Meeting	Nanjing, China	3 Jun 2022	
3	13.69 (+0.9 m/s)	1st place, gold medalist(s)	CAA Training Base Permit Meeting	Nanjing, China	4 Jun 2022	
4	13.68 (−0.2 m/s)	(gold) (Heat 2)	National Athletics Grand Prix Series	Huangshi, China	14 Jul 2022	
5	13.64 (−0.3 m/s)	(silver) (Heat 2)	National Grand Prix	Rizhao, China	26 Apr 2023	
6	13.50 (−1.6 m/s)	2nd place, silver medalist(s)	National Grand Prix	Taizhou, China	26 May 2023	
7	13.40 (+0.3 m/s)	1st place, gold medalist(s)	National Grand Prix	Chongqing, China	2 Jun 2023	
8	13.24 (+0.3 m/s)	3rd place, bronze medalist(s)	2025 Xiamen Diamond League	Xiamen, China	26 Apr 2025	
