= Athletics at the 2023 Pan American Games – Women's 100 metres hurdles =

Women's 100 metres hurdles at the 2023 Pan American Games
- Venue: Julio Martínez National Stadium
- Dates: October 31 – November 1
- Competitors: 12 from 10 nations
- Winning time: 13.06

Medalists
| Gold medal | Andrea Vargas | Costa Rica |
| Silver medal | Greisys Roble | Cuba |
| Bronze medal | Alaysha Johnson | United States |

The women's 100 metres hurdles competition of the athletics events at the 2023 Pan American Games was held on October 31 and November 1 at the Julio Martínez National Stadium of Santiago, Chile.

== Records ==
Prior to this competition, the existing world and Pan American Games records were as follows:

| World record | Tobi Amusan (NGR) | 12.12 | Eugene, United States | July 24, 2022 |
| Pan American Games record | Queen Harrison (USA) | 12.52 | Toronto, Canada | July 21, 2015 |

== Schedule ==
| Date | Time | Round |
|---|---|---|
| October 31, 2023 | 19:25 | Semifinal |
| November 1, 2023 | 19:48 | Final |

== Results ==
All times shown are in seconds.

| KEY: | q | Fastest non-qualifiers | Q | Qualified | NR | National record | PB | Personal best | SB | Seasonal best | DQ | Disqualified |

=== Semifinal ===
Qualification: First 3 in each heat (Q) and next 2 fastest (q) qualified for the final. The results were as follows:

| Rank | Heat | Name | Nationality | Time | Notes |
|---|---|---|---|---|---|
| 1 | 2 | Andrea Vargas | Costa Rica | 12.78 | Q, SB |
| 2 | 1 | Alaysha Johnson | United States | 12.99 | Q |
| 3 | 1 | Greisys Roble | Cuba | 13.16 | Q |
| 4 | 2 | Paola Vázquez | Puerto Rico | 13.27 | Q |
| 5 | 2 | Ketiley Batista | Brazil | 13.31 | Q |
| 6 | 1 | Keira Christie-Galloway | Canada | 13.36 | Q |
| 7 | 2 | Yoveinny Mota | Venezuela | 13.39 | q |
| 8 | 1 | Jocelyn Echazábal | Cuba | 13.51 | q |
| 9 | 1 | Caroline de Melo | Brazil | 13.62 | |
| 10 | 1 | María Eguiguren | Chile | 14.07 | |
| 11 | 2 | Nancy Sandoval | El Salvador | 14.34 | |
| 12 | 2 | Deya Erickson | British Virgin Islands | 14.42 | |

=== Final ===
The results were as follows:

| Rank | Lane | Name | Nationality | Time | Notes |
|---|---|---|---|---|---|
| 1st place, gold medalist(s) | 5 | Andrea Vargas | Costa Rica | 13.09 | |
| 2nd place, silver medalist(s) | 4 | Greisys Roble | Cuba | 13.09 | |
| 3rd place, bronze medalist(s) | 6 | Alaysha Johnson | United States | 13.19 | |
| 4 | 7 | Ketiley Batista | Brazil | 13.38 | |
| 5 | 8 | Yoveinny Mota | Venezuela | 13.39 | |
| 6 | 1 | Jocelyn Echazábal | Cuba | 13.40 | |
| 7 | 3 | Paola Vázquez | Puerto Rico | 13.51 | |
| 8 | 2 | Keira Christie-Galloway | Canada | 13.60 | |
