= Fitz Coleman =

Jamaican athletics coach

Fitz Coleman is a track and field athletics coach, specializing in hurdling events. He is currently the technical director and head coach of the International Association of Athletics Federations (IAAF) recognised High Performance Training Centre in Kingston, Jamaica which is responsible for training the country's track athletes. He is also, along with Glen Mills, part of the coaching team for Usain Bolt and the Jamaican Olympic track team. He received a person of the year award from The Jamaica Gleaner in recognition of his contributions to Sport in Jamaica. Other sprinters he has coached include 400 metres Commonwealth Games medallist Jermaine Gonzales.
