= Theo Pedre =

French hurdler (born 2005)

Théo Pedre
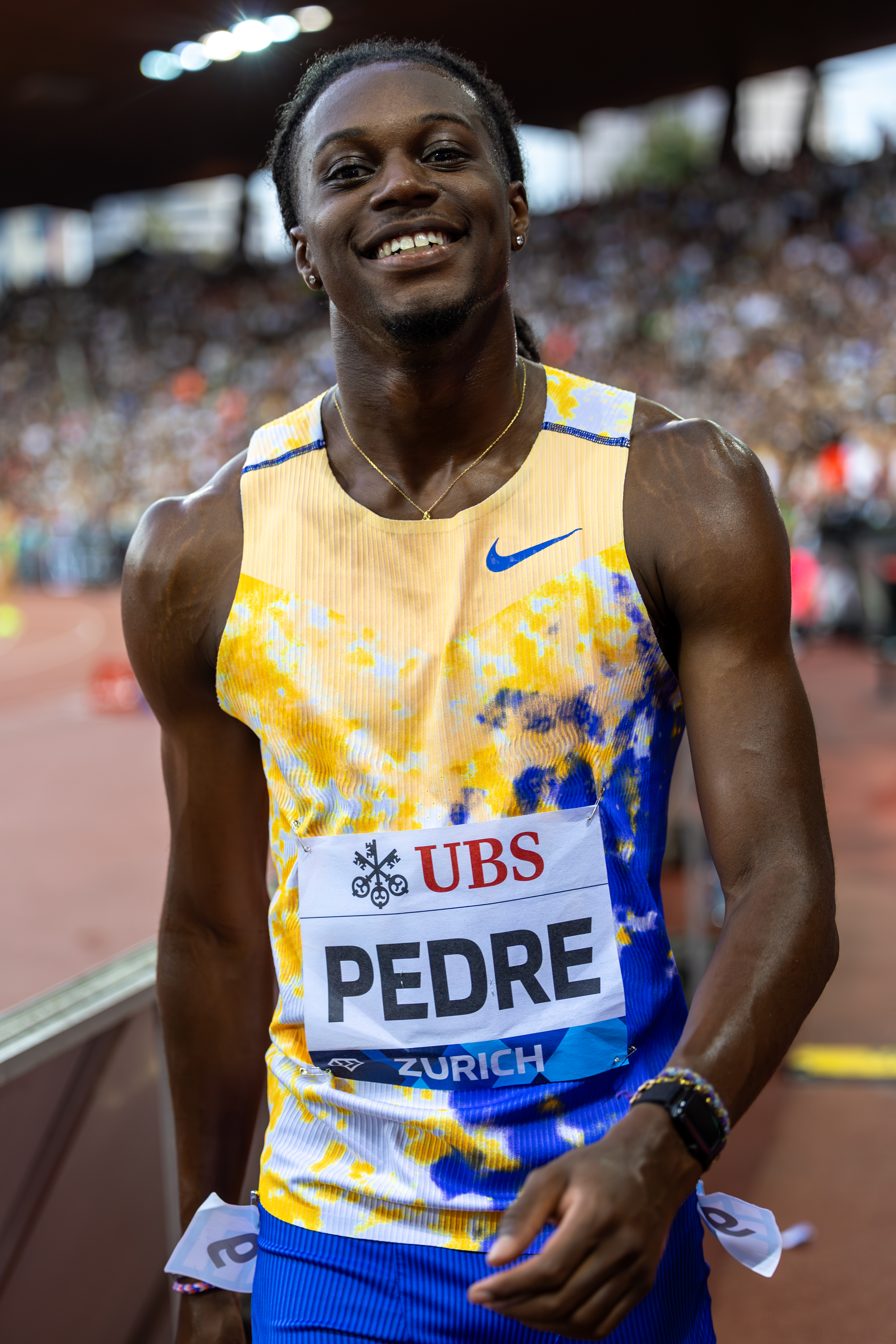
- Pedre at the 2026 Wanda Diamond League Weltklasse Zürich competition

Personal information
- Born: 4 May 2005 (age 21) Gonesse, France
- Height: 188 cm (6 ft 2 in)
- Weight: 75 kg (165 lb)

Sport
- Country: France
- Sport: Athletics
- Event: Hurdles

Achievements and titles
- Personal bests: 60m hurdles: 7.61 (Miramas, 2025); 110m hurdles: 13.31 (Jerusalem, 2023)

Théo Pedre (born 4 May 2005) is a French sprint hurdler.

== Biogrpahy ==
From Goussainville, Val-d'Oise, he competed for Entente Franconville Cesame Val dOise (EFCVO) in Val d'Oise. He set a personal best at the junior height 110m hurdles of 13.26 seconds in Franconville on 19 June 2022.

He finished third over 60 metres hurdles at the French Indoor Athletics Championships in Miramas in February 2025, at the age of 19 years-old. He was selected for the 60 metres hurdles at the 2025 European Athletics Indoor Championships in Appeldoorn. At the championships, he qualified for the semi-finals.

On 12 August 2026, he competed in the final of the 110 m hurdles at the 2026 European Athletics Championships in Birmingham, England, placing sixth overall.
