= Rayniah Jones =

American athlete

Personal information
- Born: 28 September 2001 (age 24)

Sport
- Sport: Athletics
- Events: Hurdles, Sprint

Achievements and titles
- Personal bests: 100 m: 11.29 (2021); 200m: 22.64 (2023) 100mH: 12.43 (2026); Indoors; 60m: 7.21 (2022); 200m: 23.35 (2022); 60mH: 7.90 (2022)
Medal record
Women's athletics
Representing United States
NACAC U23 Championships
Gold medal – first place	2023 San Jose	100 m hurdles
Gold medal – first place	2023 San Jose	4 × 100 m

Rayniah Jones (born 28 September 2001) is an American high hurdler and sprinter.

== Biography ==
Originally from Miami, Jones was educated at Miami Southridge Senior High School. In 2021 as a freshman at University of Central Florida, Jones set personal best times of 11.29 seconds in the 100 meters and 12.73 seconds in the 100 metres hurdles. She placed second to Anna Cockrell in the 100 m hurdles at the 2021 NCAA Division I Outdoor Track and Field Championships and was a semi-finalist at the U.S. Olympic Trials in 2021.

In July 2023, she won gold medals in the 100 metres hurdles and in the 4 × 100 metres relay at the NACAC U23 Championships.

She became UCF's first Big 12 Conference champion in the 100 metres hurdles. After her undergraduate graduation in 2023 in criminal justice and journalism, Jones studied for a master's degree in political science and was named the 2024 Big 12 Track and Field Scholar-Athlete of the Year. She finished her UCF career as a 10-time All-American and finished third overall in the 100m hurdles with a program-record 12.59 at the 2024 NCAA Outdoor Championships. She was a semi-finalist again at the U.S. Olympic Trials in 2024.

On 18 April 2026, Jones won the 100 metres hurdles into a strong head wind at the Addis Ababa Grand Prix, the first World Athletics Continental Tour meeting to be held in Ethiopia, before placing fourth in the 100 m dash at the Kip Keino Classic in Kenya. That month, she won the 100 m hurdles in 12.68 seconds (-0.4), ahead of Cyrena Samba-Mayela at the Botswana Golden Grand Prix in Gaborone and won in 12.72 seconds at the Simbine Classic in South Africa. Jones also won the 100 metres hurdles at the 2026 Paavo Nurmi Games in Finland on 3 June in 12.60 seconds. On 6 June, she ran 12.62 seconds for the 100 m hurdles at the USATF Lone Star Grand Prix in College Station, Texas. Competing at the Boris Hanzekovic Memorial in Zagreb on 26 June, she ran the 100m hurdles in a new personal best of 12.43 seconds placing second in a photo finish with compatriot Alaysha Johnson, who was credited with the same time. Jones placed sixth competing in the 2026 Diamond League on 28 June at the 2026 Meeting de Paris. On 14 July, she placed second to Masai Russell with 12.47 seconds at the István Gyulai Memorial, in Budapest. Competing in the Diamond League at the 2026 Athletissima in Lausanne, Switzerland on 21 August 2026, she placed fourth. In September, she competed in the 100 m hurdles at the inaugural World Ultimate Championship in Budapest.

== Personal life ==
Jones has also worked as a model, featuring in Sports Illustrated.
