= Franco le Roux =

South African athlete (born 2005)

Personal information
- Born: 1 December 2005 (age 20)

Sport
- Sport: Athletics
- Event: Hurdles
- Coached by: Shaun Bownes

Achievements and titles
- Personal bests: 60mH: 7.50 (2026); 110mH: 13.44 (2025)

Franco le Roux (born 1 December 2005) is a South African hurdler. He won the 2025 South African Athletics Championships in the 110 metres hurdles. In 2026, he set an African indoor record in the 60 metres hurdles.

== Biography ==
In April 2025, le Roux won the 110 metres at the South African Athletics Championships ahead of Mondray Barnard, in Potchefstroom, in a personal best 13.44 seconds. He finished runner-up to Barnard the following month competing for North-West University at the USSA Championships.

Le Roux qualified for the final of the 110 metres hurdles representing South Africa at the 2025 Summer World University Games in Bochum, Germany, placing eighth overall.

On 30 January 2026, le Roux set a new personal best of 7.60 seconds for the 60 metres hurdles whilst competing at the Elite Indoor Miramas Meeting, a World Athletics Indoor Tour silver meeting in Miramas, France.

In March 2026, he was selected for the 2026 World Athletics Indoor Championships in Poland. Competing in the heats on 21 March, le Roux set an African record of 7.50 seconds to break the continental mark of 7.52 set by his coach Shaun Bownes in 2001. Le Roux went on to place seventh in the final, where he ran 7.51 seconds.

Le Roux placed fourth overall in the final of the 110 metres hurdles at the 2026 Commonwealth Games in Glasgow, Scotland.
