= Erwann Cinna =

French hurdler (born 2003)

Personal information
- Born: 26 February 2003 (age 23)
- Height: 182 cm (6 ft 0 in)
- Weight: 74 kg (163 lb)

Sport
- Country: France
- Sport: Athletics
- Event: Hurdles

Achievements and titles
- Personal bests: 60m hurdles: 7.61 (Miramas, 2026); 110m hurdles 13.37 (Talance, 2024)
Medal record
Men's athletics
Representing France
Mediterranean Games
Gold medal – first place	2026 Taranto	110 m hurdles
European U23 Championships
Bronze medal – third place	2023 Espoo	110m hs

Erwann Cinna (born 26 September 2003) is a French hurdler.

== Career ==
Cinna is a member of Athlé 91 athletics club in Paris. He finished fifth in the 110 metres hurdles at the 2021 World Athletics U20 Championships in Nairobi, Kenya.

He became French U23 champion in Fontainebleau in 2023 in the 110m hurdles, running a time of 13.49 seconds. He was a bronze medalist behind Sasha Zhoya and Lorenzo Ndele Simonelli in the 110 metres hurdles at the 2023 European Athletics U23 Championships in Espoo, Finland, running a personal best 13.47 seconds.

He was runner-up to Zhoya at the 2024 French Athletics Championships in Angers in June 2024. In July 2024, he retained his French U23 title, running a championship record time of 13.39 seconds in Albi. That month, he lowered his personal best to 13.37 seconds in Talence.

He set a new personal best for the 60 metres hurdles of 7.63 seconds at the Meeting de Nantes Metropole, a World Athletics Indoor Tour Bronze event, in Nantes, France, in January 2025. In June 2025, he was named for the 2025 Golden Gala, part of the 2025 Diamond League, placing seventh overall in 13.56 seconds.

Cinna ran a personal best 7.61 seconds in finishing runner-up to Franco le Roux in the 60m hurdles at the Elite Indoor Miramas Meeting, a World Athletics Indoor Tour silver meeting in Miramas in January 2026. That month, he ran 7.62 seconds at the Meeting de Paris. He placed fifth in the 60 metres hurdles at the 2026 French Indoor Athletics Championships in Aubiere.
