= Kendry Menéndez =

Cuban athlete (born 2006)

Personal information
- Born: Kendry Lazaro Menéndez Fuentes; 14 March 2006 (age 20)

Sport
- Sport: Athletics
- Event: Hurdles

Achievements and titles
- Personal bests: 60mH: 7.56 (Lodz, 2026); 110mH: 13.01 (London, 2026)

Kendry Lazaro Menéndez Fuentes (born 14 March 2006) is a Cuban-born high hurdler, based in Qatar.

== Biography ==
Trained at the Aspire Academy in Qatar, in February 2025, Menéndez won the Qatar Indoor Meeting in Doha in 7.46 seconds for the 60 metres hurdles (99 cm hurdles). This came after he ran an unratified 7.48 seconds the previous month. At the Grand Prix Brescia, in Italy, in July 2025, Menéndez was third in a personal best 13.28 seconds (+0.0 m/s) for the 110 metres hurdles behind Dylan Beard and Cordell Tinch, a time which tied him for fourth on the world U20 all-time list. The following month, he won in Belgrade, Serbia, winning in 13.42 seconds, finishing ahead of South Africa's Mondray Barnard.

As a 19-year-old in his first indoor season over senior height hurdles, he ran a personal best of 7.61 seconds to win the 60 m hurdles at the Aarhus Sprint'n'Jump in January 2026 in Denmark. Later that month, he lowered his personal best to 7.56 seconds at the Orlen Cup Lodz, in Poland. He equalled that best the following month at the Meeting Hauts-de-France Pas-de-Calais Trophée in France.

In May 2026, Menéndez ran 13.26 seconds for the 100 metres hurdles at the Saudi Athletics Grand Prix in Saudi Arabia. That month, he set a personal best and meeting record 13.07 seconds (+1.6) in the preliminary round at the Irena Szewińska Memorial in Bydgoszcz, Poland, before placing second to Jamal Britt in the final later in the day. On 16 June, Menendez won the men's 110m hurdles in 13.14 seconds at the Golden Spike Ostrava and on 19 June placed fifth at the 2026 Doha Diamond League. Competing at the Boris Hanzekovic Memorial in Zagreb on 26 June, he ran the 110m hurdles in a new personal best of 13.02 seconds. He placed sixth on 28 June at the 2026 Meeting de Paris. At the 2026 London Athletics Meet on 18 July, Menendez ran a personal best for second in 13.01, finishing behind world record holder Ja'Kobe Tharp. He placed second at the 2026 Athletissima in Lausanne on 21 August, running into a headwind and finishing with a time of 13.20. At the 2026 Diamond League Final in Brussels in September, he placed fourth in the 110 metres hurdles.
