= Mondray Barnard =

South African athlete (born 2002)

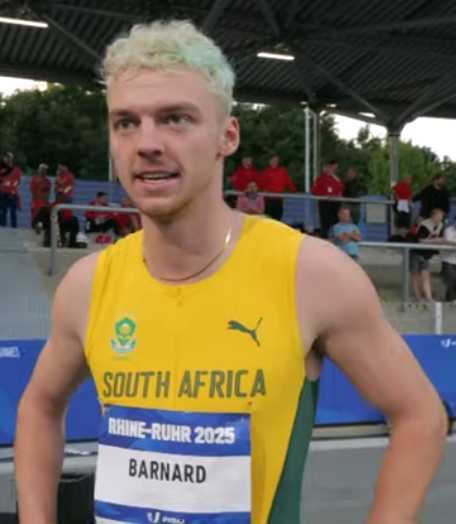
- At the 2025 Summer World University Games

Personal information
- Born: 8 May 2002 (age 24)

Sport
- Sport: Athletics
- Event: Hurdles

Achievements and titles
- Personal best: 110mH: 13.44 (2025)
Medal record
Men's athletics
Representing South Africa
Summer World University Games
| Bronze medal – third place | 2025 Bochum | 110m hurdles |

Mondray Barnard (born 8 May 2002) is a South African hurdler. He competed over 110 metres hurdles at the 2025 World Athletics Championships.

== Biography ==
He is coached by Jessi Kahn of the Heat Athletics Club in South Africa. He had a second-place finish in the 110 metres hurdles at the South African Athletics Championships in 2024.

In the spring of 2025, he had a second place finish in 13.49 seconds at the Irena Szewinska Memorial, a World Athletics Continental Tour meeting in Bydgoszcz, Poland and finished runner-up to Franco le Roux at the South African Athletics Championships in a personal best 13.44 seconds in Potchefstroom.

He won a bronze medal in the 110 metres hurdles at the 2025 Summer World University Games in Bochum, Germany in July 2025. The following month, he was second in Belgrade, Serbia, running 13.57 seconds, finishing behind Cuban Kendry Menendez. He represented South Africa at the 2025 World Athletics Championships in Tokyo, Japan in September 2025, running 13.57 seconds without qualifying for the semi-final.

In March 2026, he was a semi-finalist competing for South Africa in the 60 m hurdles at the 2026 World Athletics Indoor Championships in Toruń, Poland.

== Personal life ==
Barnard is from Gqeberha in the Eastern Cape. He attended The IIE's Varsity College in South Africa, studying for a Bachelor of Commerce degree.
