= Daniel Goriola =

British athlete (born 2005)

Personal information
- Nationality: British (English)
- Born: 29 March 2005 (age 21)

Sport
- Sport: Athletics
- Event: 110m hurdles
- Club: Blackheath and Bromley Harriers AC

Achievements and titles
- Personal bests: 110m hurdles: 13.55 (Manchester, 2024)
Medal record
British Athletics Championships
Gold medal – first place	2024 Manchester	110m hurdles
British Indoor Athletics Championships
Gold medal – first place	2025 Birmingham	60m hurdles

Daniel Goriola (born 29 March 2005) is a British hurdler. He became British national champion in the 110m hurdles in 2024, and indoor champion over 60m hurdles in 2025 and 2026.

== Biography ==
Goriola attended Our Lady's Catholic Primary School, Dartford. He proceeded to Dartford Grammar School for his secondary education. In 2023, he was runner up in the 110m hurdles at the English Schools Championships. He attended the University of Nottingham from 2023 where he studies law.

In June 2023, coached by Tony Jarrett at Blackheath and Bromley Harriers Athletic Club, he became the England under-20 champion in the 110m hurdles in Chelmsford.

In February 2024, he finished third in the 60m hurdles at the 2024 British Indoor Athletics Championships in Birmingham. That month, he set a personal best of 7.72 in the process of winning the British Universities and Colleges Sport (BUCS) 60m hurdles title. The time placed him second all-time in the British under-20 age group to Jon Ridgeon’s 7.68 which was set almost 40 years previously. He also won the BUCS outdoor 110m hurdles title in May 2024 in Manchester, running 13.66 seconds.

In June 2024, he won the South of England U20 title over 110m hurdles. That month, he became the British 110 metres hurdles champion after winning the 2024 British Athletics Championships in Manchester ahead of Sam Bennett. At the age of 19 years-old, he became the first U20 athlete to win the title since Colin Jackson. In July, Daniel secured his place for the U20 World Championships, 2024 by winning the U20 110m hurdles at the Alexander Stadium in Birmingham. He was subsequently selected for the 2024 World Athletics U20 Championships in Lima, Peru.

In October 2024, he was nominated by Athletics Weekly for best British male junior. In November 2024, he was named by British Athletics on the Olympic Futures Programme for 2025.

Goriola won the gold medal in the 60 metres hurdles at the 2025 British Indoor Athletics Championships. He was selected for the British team for the 2025 European Athletics Indoor Championships in Apeldoorn.

Goriola was named in the British team for the 2025 European Athletics U23 Championships in Bergen. On 3 August 2025, he placed second in the final of the 110 metres hurdles at the 2025 UK Athletics Championships in Birmingham. In October 2025, he was retained on the British Athletics Olympic Futures Programme for 2025/26.

On 14 February 2026, Goriola retained his 60 metres hurdles title at the 2026 British Indoor Athletics Championships in Birmingham, credited with the win via a photo-finish, after he and Tade Ojora both ran the final in 7.78 seconds. Competing outdoors in May, Goriola won the men's 110m hurdles in 13.65 (1.3) at the Loughborough International. In October 2026, he was retained on the 2026/27 Olympic Futures Programme awarded by UK Athletics.
