= Timme Koster =

Dutch athlete and bobsledder (born 2002)

Personal information
- Born: 12 December 2002 (age 23) Alkmaar, Netherlands

Sport
- Country: Netherlands
- Sport: Athletics, Bobsleigh
- Events: Hurdles (athletics), Four-man (bobsleigh)
- Club: AV Trias
- Coached by: Sven Ootjers

Timme Koster (born 12 December 2002) is a Dutch athlete and bobsledder. In athletics, he has twice been the Dutch national champion in 110 metres hurdles. In bobsleigh, he represented the Netherlands at the 2026 Winter Olympics.

== Career ==
=== Athletics ===
Koster began his sports career in athletics, specializing in hurdling. He has national champion in the 110 meters hurdles in 2022 and 2023. Koster participated in the European Athletics Championships in 2024 and the European Athletics Indoor Championships in 2025 In the 2024 Championships, he advanced to the semi-finals, while in the 2025 Championships in 60 meters hurdles he did not advance past his qualifying round.

=== Bobsleigh ===
Koster was recruited to bobsleigh in 2025 to join the team of Dave Wesselink, and began competing in the Bobsleigh World Cup. In 2026, he was part of Wesselink's team for four-man at the Winter Olympics. The team finished 13th.

== Bobsleigh results ==
All results are sourced from the International Bobsleigh and Skeleton Federation (IBSF).

=== Olympic Games ===
Event	Four-man
(Italy) 2026 Milano Cortina	13th
