= Demario Prince =

Jamaican athlete (born 2004)

Personal information
- Nationality: Jamaican
- Born: 27 October 2004 (age 22) Spanish Town, Jamaica

Sport
- Sport: Athletics
- Event: Hurdles
- College team: Baylor Bears

Achievements and titles
- Personal bests: 60m hurdles 7.43 (2026); 110m hurdles: 13.01 (2026)
Medal record
Men's athletics
Representing Jamaica
Commonwealth Games
Gold medal – first place	2026 Glasgow	110 m hurdles
NACAC Championships
Gold medal – first place	2025 Freeport	110 m hurdles
CARIFTA Games Junior (U20)
Silver medal – second place	2022 Kingston	110m hurles

Demario Prince (born 27 October 2004) is a Jamaican sprint hurdler. He placed fourth over 60 metres hurdles at the 2026 World Athletics Indoor Championships. He won the 110 metres hurdles at the 2026 Jamaican Championships and the 2026 Commonwealth Games.

Prince was a semi-finalist in the 110 metres hurdles at the 2025 World Championships, having won the gold medal at the 2025 NACAC Championships.

== Early life ==
He attended St Jago High School where he competed at the local Champs and the CARIFTA Games, before studying at Baylor University in the United States.

== Career ==
Prince competed for Jamaica at the 2022 World Athletics U20 Championships in Cali, Colombia, reaching the final of the 110 metres hurdles.

Prince lowered his personal best in running 7.57 seconds to win the men's 60m hurdles final at the Charlie Thomas Invitational held at Texas A&M University in February 2025. He competed for Jamaica at the 2025 World Athletics Indoor Championships in Nanjing, China, where he qualified for the final of the 60 metres hurdles, placing sixth overall.

Prince ran a personal best 13.12 seconds for the 100m hurdles to finish in second place at the 2025 Jamaican Athletics Championships. He was named in the Jamaican squad for the 2025 NACAC Championships in Freeport, The Bahamas and he won the gold medal in the 110 metres hurdles. He was a semi-finalist competing at the 2025 World Athletics Championships in the men's 110 metres hurdles in Tokyo, Japan, in September 2025.

Competing at the 2026 NCAA Division I Indoor Track and Field Championships, he placed third in the final of the 60 metres hurdles. Prince lowered his personal best to 7.43 seconds representing Jamaica in the 60m hurdles at the 2026 World Athletics Indoor Championships in Toruń, Poland, placing fourth overall.

On 12 June, he placed sixth in the 110 m hurdles final at the 2026 NCAA Outdoor Championships, running 13.25 seconds. On 21 June, Prince won his first senior national title in the 110 metres hurdles final at the 2026 Jamaican Athletics Championships in 13.12 seconds. On 4 July, he ran a personal best 13.01 seconds (+1.8 m/s) to place third in the 110m hurdles at the 2026 Prefontaine Classic. On 27 July, Prince won the gold medal for the Jamaica team at the 2026 Commonwealth Games in Glasgow, Scotland, winning ahead of Sam Bennett of England with 13.17 seconds. In September, he competed in the 110 m hurdles at the inaugural World Ultimate Championship in Budapest.

== Personal life ==
He is the son of Donovan Prince and Helerine Gordon-Prince and has two older siblings: Kacian and Chevaughn.
