= Manuel Mordi =

German athlete (born 2003)

Personal information
- Nationality: German
- Born: 15 August 2003 (age 22)

Sport
- Sport: Athletics
- Event: Hurdles

Achievements and titles
- Personal bests: 110 m hurdles: 13.36 s (Leverkusen, 2024)

Manuel Mordi (born 15 August 2003) is a German sprint hurdler. He won the German Athletics Championships in 2023 and 2024 in the 110 metres hurdles, and in 2025 in the 60 metres hurdles. He competed at the 2024 Olympic Games.

== Career ==
A member of Hamburger SV, Mordi was a sprinter until 2020, when he turned his focus to hurdles. He reached the semi-final of the 2022 World Athletics U20 Championships in Cali, Colombia, and was only four-hundreds of a second away from qualifying for the final. In 2023, he finished seventh in the final of the 110 m hurdles at the European Athletics U23 Championships. He also became German Champion at the German Athletics Championships.

In May 2024, he ran a personal-best 13.56 seconds for the 110 m hurdles to win at the Kurpfalz Gala Weinheim meet in Weinheim, Germany. Later that month, he lowered his personal best again, running 13.36 seconds in Leverkusen.

Mordi reached the semi-finals of the 110 m hurdles at the 2024 European Athletics Championships in Rome. He retained his German national title in June 2024. He competed in the 110 m hurdles at the 2024 Paris Olympics.

On 9 February 2025, Mordi set a new personal best for the 60 metres hurdles running 7.56 seconds in Dortmund. It was the first time he had run under 7.60 seconds in the event. He won the German Indoor Athletics Championships over 60 metres hurdles in February 2025 in 7.58 seconds. He competed at the 2025 European Athletics Indoor Championships in Apeldoorn, Netherlands, in the 60 metres hurdles, but did not progress to the semi-finals.

Mordi represented Germany at the 2025 European Athletics Team Championships in Madrid in June 2025. He competed at the 2025 World Athletics Championships in the men's 110 metres hurdles in Tokyo, Japan, in September 2025, without advancing to the semi-finals.
