= Sasha Zhoya =

French athlete

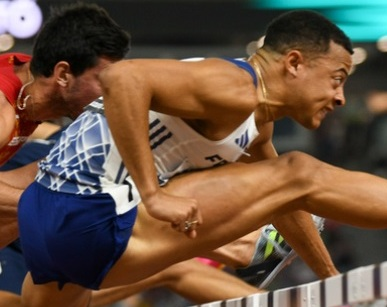
- Zhoya at the 2023 World Athletics Championships

Personal information
- Full name: Sasha Zhoya
- Nationality: Australian / French / Zimbabwean
- Born: 25 June 2002 (age 24) Subiaco, Australia
- Height: 1.84 m (6 ft 0 in)
- Weight: 74 kg (163 lb)

Sport
- Country: France
- Sport: Track and field
- Events: 60 m hurdles, 110 m hurdles
- Club: Melville Little Athletics; Clermont Athlétisme Auvergne
- Coached by: Jason Moyle (2014–); Lindsay Bunn (2015–); Francois Juillard (2018–); Philippe d'Encausse (2019–); Dimitri Demonière (2019–); Ladji Doucouré (2019–)
Medal record
Men's athletics
Representing France
World U20 Championships
Gold medal – first place	2021 Nairobi	110 m hurdles
Diamond League
First place	2024	110 m hurdles
European U23 Championships
Gold medal – first place	2023 Espoo	110 m hs
European U20 Championships
Gold medal – first place	2021 Tallinn	110 m hurdles

Sasha Zhoya (born 25 June 2002) is an Australian-born track and field athlete who specializes in hurdling events. Born in Australia, and of French and Zimbabwean descent, he represents France internationally.

He is the current holder of two world under-18 best performances (110 m hurdles, 60 m hurdles) and two world U20 records (60 m hurdles, 110 m hurdles).

== Early life and background ==
Sasha Zhoya was born on 25 June 2002 in Subiaco, a suburb of Perth, to a French mother, Catherine Larbiose-Zhoya, and a Zimbabwean father, Yonah Zhoya, so he has the triple Franco-Australian-Zimbabwean nationality.

Raised in Australia, he began athletics at the age of 8 at Melville Little Athletics, where his mother was a coach, and joined the Australian Institute of Sport at age 14. He is trained by Lindsay Bunn for sprinting events, and by Paul Burgess and Alex Parnov for the pole vault.

He started training in France in 2017, at Clermont Athlétisme Auvergne, club of his mother's city of origin, where he is coached by Philippe d'Encausse for the pole vault.

Holder of three passports and competing in both Australian and French youth championships, Zhoya had to decide which country he would represent in competition. In 2020, he decided to compete for France. He joined the sprint-hurdles group of the French Athletics Federation at INSEP, supervised by Ladji Doucouré for the hurdles and Dimitri Demonière for the sprint events.

He wins the Diamond League 110m/hurdles finals in Brussels in 2024, after his two victories in Paris and Rome.

== Career ==
=== Under-18 ===
In 2018, at the French Junior Outdoor Championships in Bondoufle, Zhoya won the silver medal in the 100 metres and the gold medal for the 200 metres.

In February 2019, at the French Junior Indoor Championships in Liévin, he won two gold medals with two French national youth records, for pole vault with a 5.32 m vault and for the 60 metres hurdles with 7.48 seconds. It was his first competitive outing at the hurdles distance and equalled the youth record owned by Ladji Doucouré.

In April 2019, at the Australian Junior Championships, he broke the world under-18 record in pole vault with 5.56 m, one centimetre more than the Greek Emmanouíl Karalís in 2016.

In June 2019 at La Chaux-de-Fonds, he broke the French national youth record in the 100 m with 10.41 s (+1.4 m/s).

In July 2019, at the semi-final of French Junior Outdoor Championships in Angers, he broke the world under-18 record for the 110 meters hurdles with a time of 12.87 s (+1.6 m/s), improving by 9 hundredths the previous record of the Jamaican Jaheel Hyde set in 2014. He later won the final with 12.96 s. The next day, he also won the 200 m final and descended for the first time below 21 seconds, with 20.81 s but with wind assistance (+3.1 m/s).

A few days later, he broke the French national youth record in the 200 m in a meeting at Sotteville-lès-Rouen with 20.91 s.

=== Under-20 ===
In 2020, at the French Junior Indoor Championship in Miramas, Zhoya broke the world under-20 record in the 60 m hurdles with 7.34 s in the final.

In July 2021, he improved his personal best over 110 m hurdles by posting 13.02 s in the semi-final of the French junior championships in Bondoufle. Zhoya then largely won the final in 13.06 s. A few days later, he won the European U20 Championships in Tallinn in 13.05 s, his first international title. In the semi-final, he ran in 12.98 s, which was below the junior world record, but with wind assistance (+2.4 m/s).

In August 2021, Zhoya won the 110 m hurdles final of the World U20 Championships in Nairobi, Kenya while setting a new world U20 record of the distance in 12.72 s.

=== Under-23 ===
For his first season with senior height hurdles (106.7 cm), Zhoya won the 110 m hurdles final of the French Athletics Championships in 13.17 s (-0.5 m/s).

He therefore participated at the 2022 World Athletics Championships in Eugene, Oregon, where he was eliminated in the semi-finals in 13.47 s.

Zhoya also participated at the 2022 European Athletics Championships in Munich, where he fell when crossing the last hurdle and finished eighth.

For his second season with senior height hurdles, he wins the 2023 European Athletics U23 Championships in Espoo in 13.31 s (+0.5 m/s). During the semifinals he improved the U23 championship record with 13.22 s (+0.3 m/s).

Two weeks later, he won the 110 m hurdles final of the French Athletics Championships, for the second consecutive year, in 13.01 s (+2.3 m/s).

In December 2024, it was announced that he had signed up for the inaugural season of the Michael Johnson founded Grand Slam Track.

== Statistics ==
=== Personal records ===
Event	Performance	Place	Date	Notes
60 m hurdles (91.4 cm)	7.48s	Liévin, France	24 February 2019	WU18R
60 m hurdles (99 cm)	7.34s	Miramas, France	22 February 2020	WU20R
100 m	10.36s	Miramar, United States	4 May 2025	
200 m	20.68s	Albi, France	13 September 2020	
110 m hurdles (91.4 cm)	12.87s	Angers, France	6 July 2019	WU18R
110 m hurdles (99 cm)	12.72s	Nairobi, Kenya	21 August 2021	WU20R
110 m hurdles (106.7 cm)	13.06s	Miramar, United States	3 May 2025	
Pole Vault Outdoor	5.56 m	Sydney, Australia	1 April 2019	
Pole Vault Indoor	5.32 m	Liévin, France	23 February 2019	NU18R
Decathlon (U18)	7271 points	Perth, Australia	13 January 2019	

=== National titles ===
- French Athletics Championships
  - 100 m: 2018 (U18)
  - 200 m: 2019 (U18)
  - 60 m hurdles (indoor): 2019 (U18), 2020 (U20)
  - 110 m hurdles: 2019 (U18), 2021 (U20), 2022, 2023, 2024
  - Pole vault (indoor): 2019 (U18)
- Australian Athletics Championships
  - 200 m: 2017 (U16), 2019 (U18)
  - 110 m hurdles: 2017 (U17), 2019 (U18)
  - Pole vault: 2017 (U17), 2019 (U20)

=== Circuit performances ===
Grand Slam Track results
Slam	Race group	Event	Pl.	Time	Prize money
2025 Miami Slam	Short hurdles	110 m hurdles	2nd	13.06	US$50,000
2025 Miami Slam	Short hurdles	100 m	3rd	10.36	US$50,000
