= Enzo Diessl =

Austrian athlete (born 2004)

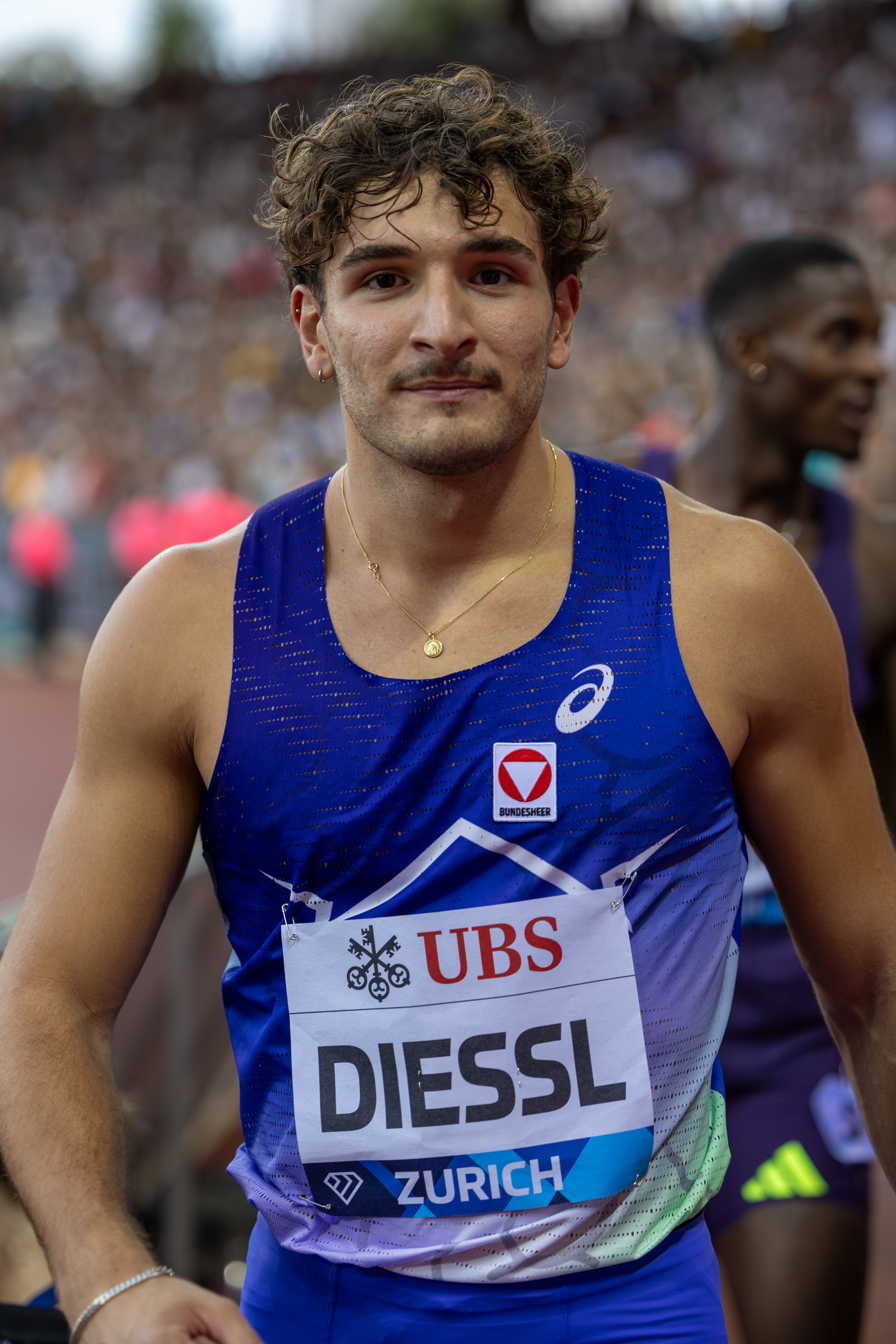
- Diessl at the 2026 Weltklasse Zürich

Personal information
- Nationality: Austrian
- Born: 6 June 2004 (age 22) Argentina

Sport
- Sport: Athletics
- Event: Hurdles

Achievements and titles
- Personal bests: 60 m hurdles 7.64 (Linz, 2024); 110 m hurdles: 13.17 (Eisenstadt, 2025)
Medal record
Men's athletics
Representing Austria
European U23 Championships
Gold medal – first place	2025 Bergen	110 m hurdles
European U20 Championships
Gold medal – first place	2023 Jerusalem	110 m hurdles

Enzo Diessl (born 6 June 2004) is an Austrian hurdler. He competed in the 110 metres hurdles at the 2024 Olympic Games and was a semi-finalist at the 2025 World Championships.

== Early life ==
Diessl was born in Argentina, moving to Austria when he was seven years-old. He is based in Leibnitz. As a child he took part in judo and athletics. He began concentrating on track and field from the age of 9 years-old, and began working with his long-term coach Beate Hochleitner shortly afterwards.

== Career ==
Diessl finished fifth in the 110 m hurdles at the U20 World Championships in Cali, Colombia in 2022.

In 2023, he ran the U20 110 metres hurdles in an Austrian U20 age group record of 13.11 seconds. He won gold at the 2023 European Athletics U20 Championships in Jerusalem over 110 metres hurdles in 13.12 seconds. In doing so, he became only the fourth Austrian to win gold at the event.

In 2024, he set a new personal best of 7.64 in the 60 metres hurdles. In May 2024, he met the qualifying standard for the 2024 European Athletics Championships in Rome with a personal best time in St. Pölten of 13.46 seconds. Earlier in the spring of 2024 he had previously recorded times of 13.31 (on 9 May in Maria Enzersdorf) and 13.38 (on 12 May in Graz), but those results had a strong tailwind and so did not count towards the standard. He subsequently competed at the European Championships, where he was a semi-finalist. In August, he competed in the 110 m hurdles at the 2024 Paris Olympics, but did not progress to the semi-finals.

He competed at the 2025 European Athletics Indoor Championships in Apeldoorn, Netherlands, in the 60 metres hurdles but unfortunately was unable to complete the race after a fall at the second hurdle although, speaking after the race, his coach said he did not suffer a serious injury.

He lowered his personal best to 13.20 seconds in St. Polten on 19 June 2025. He won the 110 meters hurdles competing for Austria at the 2025 European Athletics Team Championships Second Division in Maribor in June 2025 in 13.31 seconds. He won the gold medal in the 110 metres hurdles at the 2025 European Athletics U23 Championships, running 13.46 (-1.8 m/s) in Bergen, Norway in July 2025. He set a new personal best of 13.17 seconds in July 2025 in Eisenstadt at the Austrian Open. He was a semi-finalist competing at the 2025 World Athletics Championships in the men's 110 metres hurdles in Tokyo, Japan, in September 2025.

Diessl won the 60m hurdles title at the Austrian Indoor Athletics Championships with a time of 7.65 seconds in the final. On 4 June 2026, at the Liese Prokop Memorial in St. Pölten, he won the 110 metres hurdles in 13.40 seconds. On 12 August, he competed in the final of the 110 m hurdles at the 2026 European Athletics Championships in Birmingham, England, placing fifth overall.
