= 2022 World Athletics Indoor Championships – Men's 60 metres hurdles =

Men's 60 metres hurdles at the 2022 World Athletics Indoor Championships
- Venue: Štark Arena
- Dates: 20 March
- Competitors: 45 from 36 nations
- Winning time: 7.39

Medalists
gold medal	Grant Holloway	United States
silver medal	Pascal Martinot-Lagarde	France
bronze medal	Jarret Eaton	United States

The men's 60 metres hurdles at the 2022 World Athletics Indoor Championships took place on 20 March 2022.

== Results ==
=== Heats ===
Qualification: First 3 in each heat (Q) and the next 6 fastest (q) advance to the Semi-Finals

The heats were started at 10:05.

Rank	Heat	Lane	Name	Nationality	Time	Notes
1	5	3	Grant Holloway	United States	7.40	Q
2	6	1	Wilhem Belocian	France	7.55	Q
3	4	4	Petr Svoboda	Czech Republic	7.59	Q, SB
4	2	5	Rafael Pereira	Brazil	7.60	Q
5	5	4	Andrew Pozzi	Great Britain	7.60	Q
6	4	8	Aaron Mallett	United States	7.61	Q
7	4	1	Gregor Traber	Germany	7.63	Q
8	1	3	David King	Great Britain	7.65	Q
9	3	3	Damian Czykier	Poland	7.66	Q
9	1	8	Jarret Eaton	United States	7.66	Q
11	3	7	Yaqoub Al-Youha	Kuwait	7.66	Q
12	3	2	Chris Douglas	Australia	7.66	Q
13	5	6	Shusei Nomoto	Japan	7.66	Q
14	6	2	Michael Obasuyi	Belgium	7.66	Q
15	4	6	Asier Martínez	Spain	7.67	q
16	2	3	Pascal Martinot-Lagarde	France	7.69	Q
17	1	2	Ruebin Walters	Trinidad and Tobago	7.69	Q
18	5	7	Abdel Kader Larrinaga	Portugal	7.69	q
19	1	4	Milan Trajkovic	Cyprus	7.69	q
20	2	4	Jakub Szymański	Poland	7.70	Q
21	3	1	Mikdat Sevler	Turkey	7.70	q, NR
22	1	7	Liam van der Schaaf	Netherlands	7.72	q, PB
23	5	2	Hassane Fofana	Italy	7.73	q
24	6	3	Chen Kuei-ru	Chinese Taipei	7.74	Q, NR
25	6	6	Finley Gaio	Switzerland	7.74	
26	1	1	Gabriel Constantino	Brazil	7.74	
27	2	8	Ilari Manninen	Finland	7.74	
28	6	4	Ronald Levy	Jamaica	7.75	SB
29	4	2	Nicholas Andrews	Australia	7.75	
30	6	8	Enrique Llopis	Spain	7.76	
31	2	7	Keiso Pedriks	Estonia	7.77	
31	2	6	Konstantinos Douvalidis	Greece	7.77	SB
33	5	5	Filip Jakob Demšar	Slovenia	7.79	
34	6	7	Wellington Zaza	Liberia	7.80	
35	3	4	Bálint Szeles	Hungary	7.81	
36	1	6	Badamassi Saguirou	Niger	7.82	NR
37	6	5	Alin Ionuţ Anton	Romania	7.87	
38	1	5	Luka Trgovčević	Serbia	7.89	
39	3	5	Ang Chen Xiang	Singapore	7.91	NR
40	5	8	Jérémie Lararaudeuse	Mauritius	7.94	
41	3	6	Louis François Mendy	Senegal	7.95	
42	4	5	Richard Diawara	Mali	7.98	
43	4	7	Yohan Chaverra	Colombia	8.01	
44	2	2	Shuhei Ishikawa	Japan	8.07	
	4	3	David Yefremov	Kazakhstan	DQ	TR16.8
	3	8	Jason Joseph	Switzerland	DNS	

=== Semifinals ===
Qualification: First 2 in each heat (Q) and the next 2 fastest (q) advance to the Final

The heats were started at 17:05.

King and Nomoto were tied and King advanced after his name was drawn from a bag.

Rank	Heat	Lane	Name	Nationality	Time	Notes
1	2	6	Grant Holloway	United States	7.29	Q, =WR
2	1	4	Jarret Eaton	United States	7.52	Q
3	2	4	Pascal Martinot-Lagarde	France	7.53	Q
4	3	4	Wilhem Belocian	France	7.53	Q
5	1	1	Milan Trajkovic	Cyprus	7.53	Q, SB
6	2	2	Asier Martínez	Spain	7.55	q, PB
7	3	8	Chris Douglas	Australia	7.56	Q, AR
8	3	3	David King	Great Britain	7.57	q, PB
8	1	8	Shusei Nomoto	Japan	7.57	PB
10	3	5	Michael Obasuyi	Belgium	7.58	PB
11	1	3	Rafael Pereira	Brazil	7.58	=AR
12	1	6	Yaqoub Al-Youha	Kuwait	7.59	SB
13	3	7	Jakub Szymański	Poland	7.59	PB
14	2	3	Andrew Pozzi	Great Britain	7.60	
15	2	5	Damian Czykier	Poland	7.61	
16	2	1	Hassane Fofana	Italy	7.65	PB
17	3	6	Aaron Mallett	United States	7.67	
18	2	8	Gregor Traber	Germany	7.67	
19	2	7	Chen Kuei-ru	Chinese Taipei	7.67	NR
20	1	7	Ruebin Walters	Trinidad and Tobago	7.68	
21	3	1	Liam van der Schaaf	Netherlands	7.69	PB
22	3	2	Abdel Kader Larrinaga	Portugal	7.70	
23	1	5	Petr Svoboda	Czech Republic	7.71	
24	1	2	Mikdat Sevler	Turkey	7.75	

=== Final ===
The final was started at 19:25.

Rank	Lane	Name	Nationality	Time	Notes
1st place, gold medalist(s)	4	Grant Holloway	United States	7.39	
2nd place, silver medalist(s)	5	Pascal Martinot-Lagarde	France	7.50	
3rd place, bronze medalist(s)	6	Jarret Eaton	United States	7.53	
4	2	Asier Martínez	Spain	7.57	
5	8	Chris Douglas	Australia	7.60	
6	1	David King	Great Britain	7.62	
7	7	Milan Trajkovic	Cyprus	7.62	
8	3	Wilhem Belocian	France	7.67	
