= 2022 African Championships in Athletics – Men's 110 metres hurdles =

The men's 110 metres hurdles event at the 2022 African Championships in Athletics was held on 8 and 9 June in Port Louis, Mauritius.

== Medalists ==
Gold	Silver	Bronze
Amine Bouanani; Algeria	Jérémie Lararaudeuse; Mauritius	Antonio Alkana; South Africa

== Results ==
=== Heats ===
Qualification: First 2 of each heat (Q) and the next 2 fastest (q) qualified for the final.

Wind:
Heat 1: +2.8 m/s, Heat 2: +2.7 m/s, Heat 3: +3.3 m/s

Rank	Heat	Name	Nationality	Time	Notes
1	2	Antonio Alkana	South Africa	13.35	Q
2	3	Amine Bouanani	Algeria	13.52	Q
3	1	Wellington Zaza	Liberia	13.53	Q
4	1	Jérémie Lararaudeuse	Mauritius	13.68	Q
5	3	Saguirou Badamassi	Niger	13.71	Q
6	1	Oyeniyi Adejoye	Nigeria	13.81	q
7	3	Wiseman Mukhobe	Kenya	13.89	q
8	2	Youssef Sayed	Egypt	14.04	Q
9	2	Ruan de Vries	South Africa	14.22	
10	3	Prosper Ekporere	Nigeria	14.24	
11	2	Rivaldo Roberts	South Africa	14.25	
12	2	Michael Nzuku	Kenya	14.32	
13	3	Jorim Léonard Bangué	Cameroon	14.35	
14	1	Derese Tesfaye	Ethiopia	15.05	
15	2	Joel Tshikamba	Democratic Republic of the Congo	15.94	
	1	Louis François Mendy	Senegal	DNF	
	1	Richard Diawara	Mali	DNS	
	1	Alex Al-Ameen	Nigeria	DNS	
	2	Michael Danford	Tanzania	DNS	
	2	Alvine Nkumu	Democratic Republic of the Congo	DNS	
	3	Kemorena Tisang	Botswana	DNS	

=== Final ===
Wind: +4.8 m/s

Rank	Lane	Athlete	Nationality	Time	Notes
1st place, gold medalist(s)	4	Amine Bouanani	Algeria	13.26	
2nd place, silver medalist(s)	5	Jérémie Lararaudeuse	Mauritius	13.55	
3rd place, bronze medalist(s)	3	Antonio Alkana	South Africa	13.59	
4	6	Wellington Zaza	Liberia	13.69	
5	2	Oyeniyi Adejoye	Nigeria	13.82	
6	1	Wiseman Mukhobe	Kenya	13.85	
7	8	Saguirou Badamassi	Niger	13.93	
8	7	Youssef Sayed	Egypt	14.15	
