= 2024 African Championships in Athletics – Men's 110 metres hurdles =

Men's 110 metres hurdles at the 2024 African Championships in Athletics
- Venue: Japoma Stadium
- Location: Douala, Cameroon
- Dates: 25 June (heats); 26 June (final)
- Competitors: 15 from 11 nations
- Winning time: 13.49 CR

Medalists
gold medal	Louis François Mendy	Senegal
silver medal	Amine Bouanani	Algeria
bronze medal	Yousuf Badawy Sayed	Egypt

The men's 110 metres hurdles event at the 2024 African Championships in Athletics was held on 25 and 26 June in Douala, Cameroon.

== Records ==
Records before the 2024 African Athletics Championships
Record	Athlete (nation)	Time (s)	Location	Date
World record	Aries Merritt (USA)	12.80	Brussels, Belgium	7 September 2012
African record	Antonio Alkana (RSA)	13.11	Prague, Czech Republic	5 June 2017
Championship record	Antonio Alkana (RSA)	13.51	Asaba, Nigeria	4 August 2018
World leading	Grant Holloway (USA)	13.03	Eugene, United States	25 May 2024
African leading	Louis François Mendy (SEN)	13.41	Troyes, France	16 June 2024

== Results ==
=== Heats ===
Qualification: First 2 of each heat (Q) and the next 2 fastest (q) qualified for the final.

Wind:
Heat 1: +0.1 m/s, Heat 2: +1.0 m/s, Heat 3: +0.3 m/s

Rank	Heat	Name	Nationality	Time	Notes
1	1	Louis François Mendy	Senegal	13.58	Q
2	2	Amine Bouanani	Algeria	13.60	Q
3	3	Jérémie Lararaudeuse	Mauritius	13.60	Q
4	3	Saguirou Badamassi	Niger	13.73	Q
5	2	Matteo Ngo	Cameroon	~~13.77~~	Q, DQ
6	2	Alexander Chukwukelu	Nigeria	13.80	q
7	1	Yousuf Badawy Sayed	Egypt	13.95	Q
8	1	Alexandre Landinaff	Mauritius	13.98	q
9	2	SW Nel	South Africa	14.04	
10	3	Cameron Ngo	Cameroon	14.09	
11	1	Jorim Bangue	Cameroon	14.12	
12	3	Richard Diawara	Mali	14.19	
13	1	Denmar Jacobs	South Africa	15.16	
	2	Yohannes Goshu	Ethiopia	DQ	
	2	Tshotlego Frecky	Botswana	DQ	
	2	Kemorena Tisang	Botswana	DNS	
	2	Moses Koroma	Sierra Leone	DNS	

=== Final ===
Wind: +0.4 m/s

Rank	Lane	Athlete	Nationality	Time	Notes
1st place, gold medalist(s)	4	Louis François Mendy	Senegal	13.49	CR
2nd place, silver medalist(s)	6	Amine Bouanani	Algeria	13.59	
3rd place, bronze medalist(s)	8	Yousuf Badawy Sayed	Egypt	13.79	
	7	Matteo Ngo	Cameroon	~~13.80~~	DQ
4	3	Saguirou Badamassi	Niger	13.86	
5	5	Jérémie Lararaudeuse	Mauritius	13.87	
6	1	Alexander Chukwukelu	Nigeria	14.26	
7	2	Alexandre Landinaff	Mauritius	14.42	

== See also ==
- Athletics at the 2023 African Games – Men's 110 metres hurdles
