= Cameron Murray (hurdler) =

American athlete

Personal information
- Nationality: American
- Born: 12 December 1999 (age 26)

Sport
- Sport: Athletics
- Event: Hurdles
- College team: NC State; Tennessee

Achievements and titles
- Personal bests: Outdoor; 100 m: 10.25 (2023); 110 mH: 13.15 (2024); Indoor; 60 m: 6.63 (2024); 60 mH: 7.41 (2025)

Cameron Murray (born 12 December 1999) is an American track and field athlete who competes as a sprint hurdler.

== Early life ==
From Georgia, he attended Westlake High School. In 2018 Murray won the 110m hurdles at the USATF National Junior Olympic Track & Field Championships where he ran personal best time of13.52 seconds in the finals.

== National Collegiate Athletics Association ==
Murray attended the University of Tennessee in 2019 before transferring to North Carolina State University, where he became ACC champion at the 110 m hurdles in 2023. He set a NC State school record of 7.67 seconds for the 60m hurdles.

Murray recorded a personal best time of 13.39 seconds for the 110m hurdles to qualify for the final of the NCAA Championships in June 2023 in Albuquerque, New Mexico.

== Career ==
Murray recorded a personal best time of 7.45 to secure national silver in the 60m hurdles behind Trey Cunningham in Albuquerque, New Mexico in February 2024. He was subsequently selected for the 2024 World Athletics Indoor Championships in Glasgow, Scotland.

Murray placed second behind Grant Holloway in the 60 metres hurdles at the 2025 USA Indoor Championships in New York in February. He was subsequently selected for the 2025 World Athletics Indoor Championships in Nanjing in March 2025.
