= 2022 World Athletics Championships – Men's 110 metres hurdles =

Men's 110 metres hurdles at the 2022 World Championships
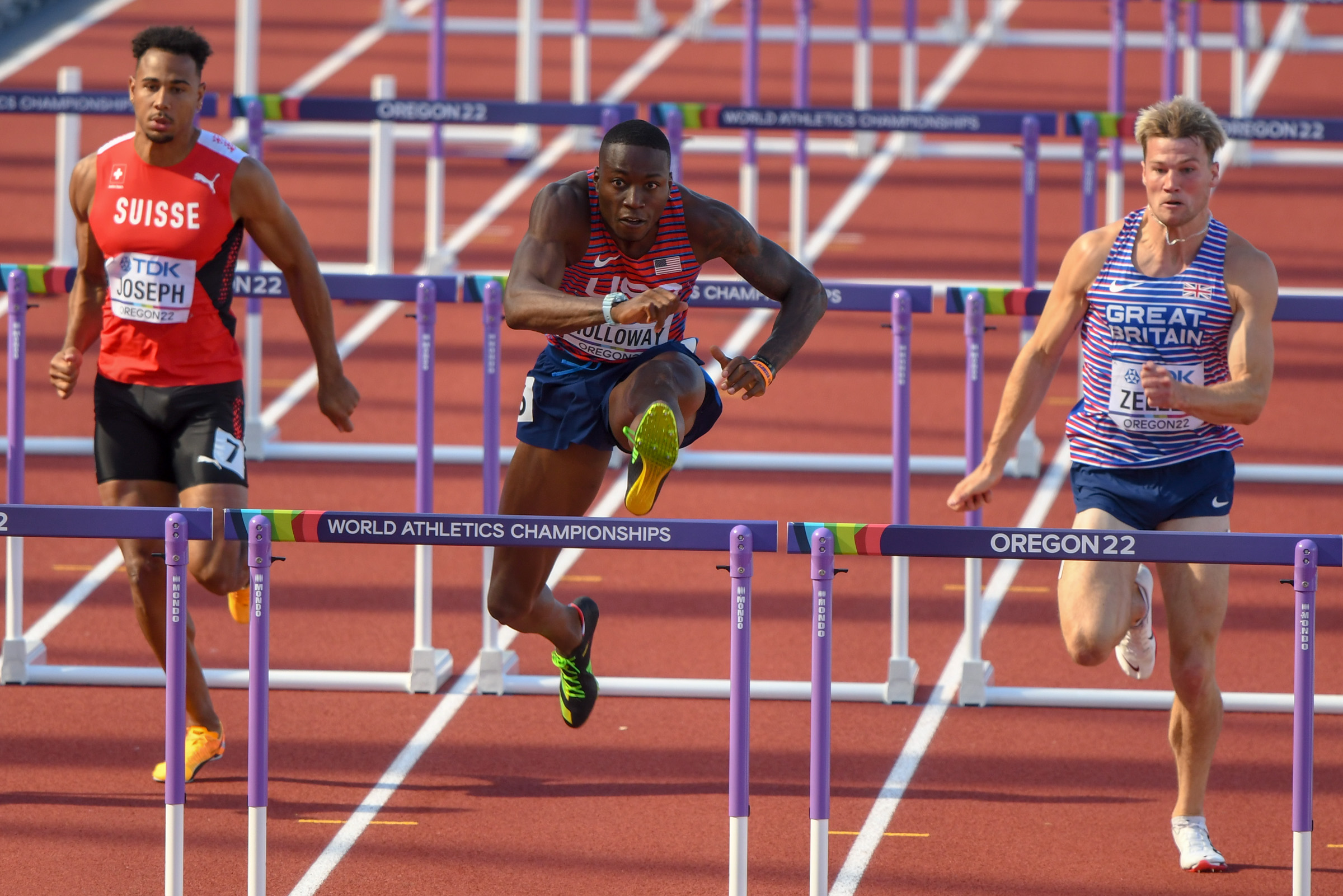
- Jason Joseph, Grant Holloway and Joshua Zeller competing in the semi-final.
- Venue: Hayward Field
- Dates: 16 July (heats); 17 July (semi-finals & final)
- Competitors: 43 from 26 nations
- Winning time: 13.03

Medalists
| gold medal | Grant Holloway | United States |
| silver medal | Trey Cunningham | United States |
| bronze medal | Asier Martínez | Spain |

The men's 110 metres hurdles at the 2022 World Athletics Championships was held at the Hayward Field in Eugene on 16 and 17 July 2022.

== Summary ==
The favored athletes, including reigning Olympic Champion Hansle Parchment, world leader and third fastest of all time Devon Allen, and defending world champion Grant Holloway, all qualified for the final. However, Parchment injured his right leg during warmups, requiring treatment on the infield. He was unable to walk to the starting line when athletes were called.

The first start was called back because of a false start; Allen had a reaction time of .099 seconds, one one thousandth of a second faster than the allowable tenth of a second. After protesting, the former Oregon athlete was disqualified to boos from the hometown crowd.

With a legal start, defending champion Grant Holloway was off to a quick start, first over the first hurdle and a full metre ahead of the field except for U.S. Collegiate champion Trey Cunningham. By the fifth hurdle, Holloway had over a metre on Cunningham, who hit that hurdle, while Damian Czykier began to emerge as the next chaser just ahead of Asier Martínez. Shane Brathwaite hit the sixth hurdle and abandoned his attempt to clear the next. Over the last two hurdles, Czykier lost a little ground while Martínez pulled ahead. Still a metre back over the final hurdle, Cunningham closed and leaned to make the finish close.

== Records ==
Before the competition records were as follows:

| Record | Athlete & Nat. | Perf. | Location | Date |
|---|---|---|---|---|
| World record | Aries Merritt (USA) | 12.80 | Brussels, Belgium | 7 September 2012 |
| Championship record | Colin Jackson (GBR) | 12.91 | Stuttgart, Germany | 20 August 1993 |
| World Leading | Devon Allen (USA) | 12.84 | New York City, United States | 12 June 2022 |
| African Record | Antonio Alkana (RSA) | 13.11 | Prague, Czech Republic | 5 June 2017 |
| Asian Record | Liu Xiang (CHN) | 12.88 | Lausanne, Switzerland | 11 July 2006 |
| North, Central American and Caribbean record | Aries Merritt (USA) | 12.80 | Brussels, Belgium | 7 September 2012 |
| South American Record | Rafael Pereira (BRA) | 13.17 | Rio de Janeiro, Brazil | 23 June 2022 |
| European Record | Colin Jackson (GBR) | 12.91 | Stuttgart, Germany | 20 August 1993 |
| Oceanian record | Kyle Vander-Kuyp (AUS) | 13.29 | Gothenburg, Sweden | 11 August 1995 |

== Qualification standard ==
The standard to qualify automatically for entry was 13.32.

== Schedule ==
The event schedule, in local time (UTC−7), was as follows:

| Date | Time | Round |
|---|---|---|
| 16 July | 11:25 | Heats |
| 17 July | 17:05 | Semi-finals |
| 17 July | 19:30 | Final |

== Results ==
=== Heats ===
The first 4 athletes in each heat (Q) and the next 4 fastest (q) qualify to the semi-finals.

Wind:
Heat 1: -0.5 m/s, Heat 2: +0.4 m/s, Heat 3: -0.3 m/s, Heat 4: +0.2 m/s, Heat 5: +0.4 m/s

| Rank | Heat | Name | Nationality | Time | Notes |
|---|---|---|---|---|---|
| 1 | 2 | Grant Holloway | United States | 13.14 | Q |
| 2 | 4 | Hansle Parchment | Jamaica | 13.17 | Q |
| 3 | 4 | Rafael Pereira | Brazil | 13.23 | Q |
| 4 | 1 | Trey Cunningham | United States | 13.28 | Q |
| 5 | 4 | Just Kwaou-Mathey | France | 13.32 | Q |
| 6 | 1 | Rasheed Broadbell | Jamaica | 13.36 | Q |
| 7 | 3 | Asier Martínez | Spain | 13.37 | Q |
| 8 | 2 | Damian Czykier | Poland | 13.37 | Q |
| 9 | 2 | Joshua Zeller | Great Britain & N.I. | 13.41 | Q |
| 10 | 3 | Amine Bouanani | Algeria | 13.44 | Q |
| 11 | 1 | Andrew Pozzi | Great Britain & N.I. | 13.45 | Q |
| 12 | 2 | Eduardo Rodrigues | Brazil | 13.46 | Q |
| 13 | 4 | Shane Brathwaite | Barbados | 13.47 | Q |
| 14 | 5 | Devon Allen | United States | 13.47 | Q |
| 15 | 3 | Sasha Zhoya | France | 13.48 | Q |
| 16 | 1 | Jason Joseph | Switzerland | 13.49 | Q |
| 17 | 1 | Pascal Martinot-Lagarde | France | 13.49 | q |
| 18 | 2 | Nicholas Hough | Australia | 13.51 | q |
| 19 | 5 | Milan Trajkovic | Cyprus | 13.52 | Q |
| 20 | 3 | Shuhei Ishikawa | Japan | 13.53 | Q |
| 21 | 3 | Orlando Bennett | Jamaica | 13.55 | q |
| 22 | 5 | Shunsuke Izumiya | Japan | 13.56 | Q |
| 23 | 5 | David King | Great Britain & N.I. | 13.57 | Q |
| 24 | 4 | Enrique Llopis | Spain | 13.58 | q |
| 25 | 2 | Xie Wenjun | China | 13.58 | |
| 26 | 1 | Mikdat Sevler | Turkey | 13.61 | |
| 27 | 5 | Antonio Alkana | South Africa | 13.64 | |
| 28 | 1 | Petr Svoboda | Czech Republic | 13.65 | |
| 29 | 2 | Louis François Mendy | Senegal | 13.70 | |
| 30 | 4 | Rachid Muratake | Japan | 13.73 | |
| 31 | 3 | Rasheem Brown | Cayman Islands | 13.78 | |
| 32 | 3 | Gregor Traber | Germany | 13.81 | |
| 33 | 5 | Wellington Zaza | Liberia | 13.81 | |
| 34 | 2 | Chen Kuei-ru | Chinese Taipei | 13.82 | |
| 35 | 4 | Elmo Lakka | Finland | 13.91 | |
| 36 | 4 | Chris Douglas | Australia | 13.95 | |
| 37 | 1 | Jérémie Lararaudeuse | Mauritius | 14.19 | |
| 38 | 5 | Richard Diawara | Mali | 14.35 | |
| | 3 | Daniel Roberts | United States | DQ | TR22.6.2 |
| | 5 | Gabriel Constantino | Brazil | DQ | TR22.6.2 |

=== Semi-finals ===
The first 2 athletes in each heat (Q) and the next 2 fastest (q) qualify to the finals. The semifinals was started on 17 July at 17:05.

Wind:
Heat 1: -0.6 m/s, Heat 2: +0.3 m/s, Heat 3: +2.5 m/s

| Rank | Heat | Name | Nationality | Time | Notes |
|---|---|---|---|---|---|
| 1 | 1 | Grant Holloway | United States | 13.01 | Q SB |
| 2 | 3 | Hansle Parchment | Jamaica | 13.02 | Q |
| 3 | 2 | Trey Cunningham | United States | 13.07 | Q |
| 4 | 3 | Devon Allen | United States | 13.09 | Q |
| 5 | 3 | Shane Brathwaite | Barbados | 13.21 | q |
| 6 | 3 | Damian Czykier | Poland | 13.22 | q |
| 7 | 3 | Just Kwaou-Mathey | France | 13.25 | |
| 8 | 2 | Asier Martínez | Spain | 13.26 | Q SB |
| 9 | 2 | Rasheed Broadbell | Jamaica | 13.27 | |
| 10 | 1 | Joshua Zeller | Great Britain & N.I. | 13.31 | Q |
| 11 | 3 | Andrew Pozzi | Great Britain & N.I. | 13.35 | |
| 12 | 1 | Amine Bouanani | Algeria | 13.37 | NR |
| 13 | 2 | Pascal Martinot-Lagarde | France | 13.40 | SB |
| 14 | 2 | Shunsuke Izumiya | Japan | 13.42 | |
| 15 | 3 | Nicholas Hough | Australia | 13.42 | |
| 16 | 3 | Enrique Llopis | Spain | 13.44 | |
| 17 | 1 | Rafael Pereira | Brazil | 13.46 | |
| 18 | 1 | Sasha Zhoya | France | 13.47 | |
| 19 | 2 | Milan Trajkovic | Cyprus | 13.49 | |
| 20 | 2 | David King | Great Britain & N.I. | 13.51 | |
| 21 | 2 | Eduardo Rodrigues | Brazil | 13.62 | |
| 22 | 1 | Orlando Bennett | Jamaica | 13.67 | |
| 23 | 1 | Jason Joseph | Switzerland | 13.67 | |
| 24 | 1 | Shuhei Ishikawa | Japan | 13.68 | |

=== Final ===
The final was started on 17 July at 19:30

| Rank | Lane | Name | Nationality | Time | Notes |
|---|---|---|---|---|---|
| 1st place, gold medalist(s) | 4 | Grant Holloway | United States | 13.03 | (0.124) |
| 2nd place, silver medalist(s) | 6 | Trey Cunningham | United States | 13.08 | (0.109) |
| 3rd place, bronze medalist(s) | 8 | Asier Martínez | Spain | 13.17 PB | (0.126) |
| 4 | 2 | Damian Czykier | Poland | 13.32 | (0.140) |
| 5 | 7 | Joshua Zeller | Great Britain & N.I. | 13.33 | (0.145) |
| | 1 | Shane Brathwaite | Barbados | DQ | (0.108) |
| | 3 | Devon Allen | United States | DQ | (0.099) |
| | 5 | Hansle Parchment | Jamaica | DNS | |
