= Amine Bouanani =

Algerian hurdler (born 1997)

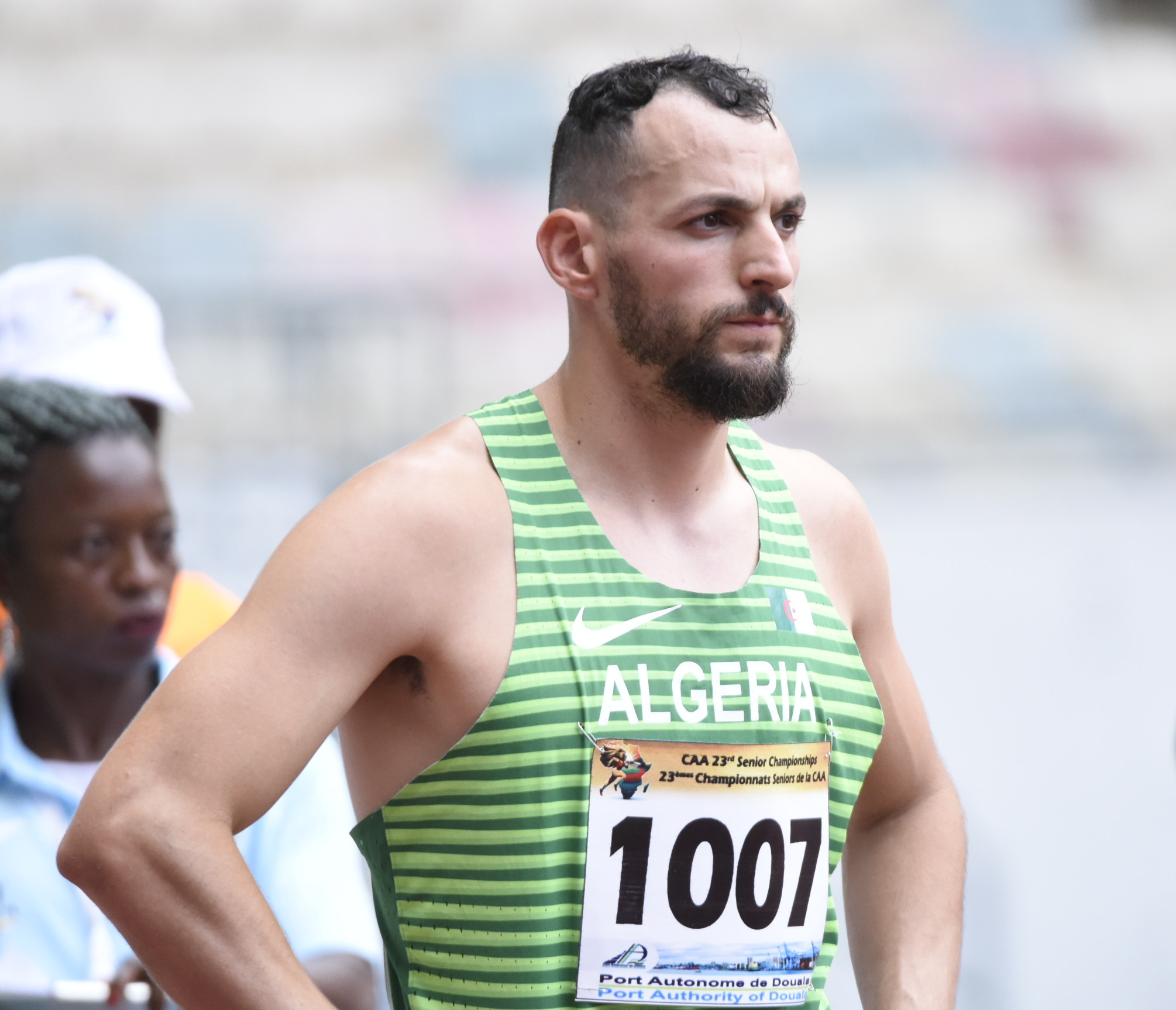
- Amine Bouanani in 2024

Personal information
- Nationality: Algerian
- Born: 17 October 1997 (age 28)

Sport
- Sport: Track and field
- Event: 110 metres hurdles

Achievements and titles
- Personal bests: 110 m hs– 13.37 (2022) NR
Medal record
Men's athletics
Representing Algeria
African Games
Gold medal – first place	2019 Rabat	110 m hurdles
Silver medal – second place	2023 Accra	110 m hurdles
African Championships
Gold medal – first place	2022 Port Louis	110 m hurdles
Silver medal – second place	2024 Douala	110 m hurdles
Islamic Solidarity Games
Gold medal – first place	2021 Konya	110m hurdles
Mediterranean Games
Silver medal – second place	Oran 2022	110 m hurdles
Arab Athletics Championships
Silver medal – second place	2021 Rades	110 m hurdles

Amine Bouanani (Arabic: أمين بوعناني; born 17 October 1997) is an Algerian track and field athlete who specialises in the 110 metres hurdles and also competes as a sprinter. At the 2019 African Games, he competed in the 110 metres hurdles, winning a gold medal with his personal best.

== International competitions ==
Year	Competition	Venue	Position	Event	Notes
Representing Algeria
2013	Arab Youth Championships	Cairo, Egypt	2nd	110 m hurdles (91.4 cm)	14.27
2013	World Youth Championships	Donetsk, Ukraine	33rd (h)	110 m hurdles (91.4 cm)	14.39
2014	African Youth Games	Gaborone, Botswana	2nd	110 m hurdles (91.4 cm)	14.09
2014	Youth Olympic Games	Nanjing, China	15th	110 m hurdles (91.4 cm)	14.19
2015	African Junior Championships	Addis Ababa, Ethiopia	2nd	110 m hurdles (99 cm)	14.24
2016	Arab Junior Championships	Tlemcen, Algeria	1st	110 m hurdles (99 cm)	13.96
2016	World U20 Championships	Bydgoszcz, Poland	15th (sf)	110 m hurdles (99 cm)	13.78
2018	African Championships	Asaba, Nigeria	5th	110 m hurdles	13.94
2018	Mediterranean U23 Championships	Jesolo, Italy	2nd	110 m hurdles	14.01
2019	Mediterranean U23 Indoor Championships	Miramas, France	3rd	60 m hurdles	13.86
2019	Arab Championships	Cairo, Egypt	3rd	110 m hurdles	14.15
2019	African Games	Rabat, Morocco	2nd	110 m hurdles	13.69
2019	Military World Games	Wuhan, China	4th	110 m hurdles	13.78
2021	Arab Championships	Radès, Tunisia	2nd	110 m hurdles	13.83
2022	African Championships	Port Louis, Mauritius	1st	110 m hurdles	13.26
2022	Mediterranean Games	Oran, Algeria	2nd	110 m hurdles	13.38
2022	World Championships	Eugene, United States	12th (sf)	110 m hurdles	13.37
2022	Islamic Solidarity Games	Konya, Turkey	1st	110 m hurdles	13.21
2023	Arab Games	Oran, Algeria	1st	110 m hurdles	13.58
2023	World Championships	Budapest, Hungary	37th (h)	110 m hurdles	13.90
2024	World Indoor Championships	Glasgow, United Kingdom	31st (h)	60 m hurdles	7.81
2024	African Games	Accra, Ghana	2nd	110 m hurdles	13.69
2024	African Championships	Douala, Cameroon	2nd	110 m hurdles	13.59
2024	Olympic Games	Paris, France	9th (rep)	110 m hurdles	13.54
2025	Arab Championships	Oran, Algeria	3rd	110 m hurdles	14.02
2025	World Championships	Tokyo, Japan	36th (h)	110 m hurdles	13.75
2025	Islamic Solidarity Games	Riyadh, Saudi Arabia	4th	110 m hurdles	13.93
