= 2023 World Athletics Championships – Men's 110 metres hurdles =

Men's 110 metres hurdles at the 2023 World Championships
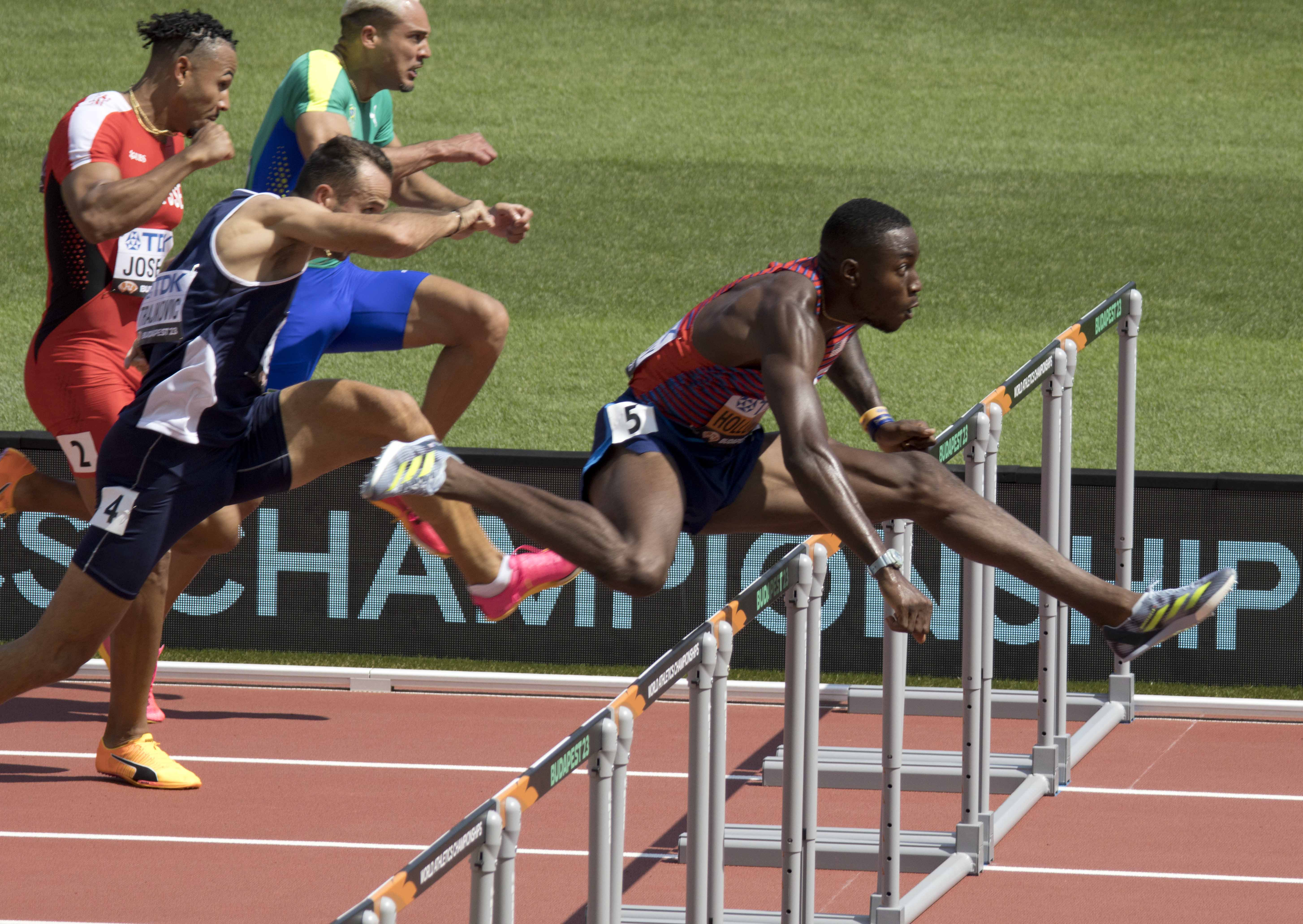
- Grant Holloway competing in the heats.
- Venue: National Athletics Centre
- Dates: 20 August (heats); 21 August (semi-final & final)
- Competitors: 45 from 28 nations
- Winning time: 12.96

Medalists
| gold medal | Grant Holloway | United States |
| silver medal | Hansle Parchment | Jamaica |
| bronze medal | Daniel Roberts | United States |

Video on YouTube Official Video

The men's 110 metres hurdles at the 2023 World Athletics Championships was held at the National Athletics Centre in Budapest on 20 and 21 August 2023.

== Summary ==
The field got out evenly but the story remained the same as the 2020 Olympics, the 2022 Indoor Championships and the 2019 and 2022 World Championships, coming off the first hurdle Grant Holloway had the lead. Over the next four hurdles, he opened a full metre on Daniel Roberts who had separated into a clear second. As Freddie Crittenden was edging into a clear third place, an American sweep looked to be developing. At the Olympics, Hansle Parchment closed fast as Holloway slowed over the final five hurdles. Here, Parchment was next to last over the fifth hurdle but he was just getting up his head of steam. By the ninth hurdle, Parchment was past Crittenden, then he pulled even with Roberts over the tenth. Holloway didn't slow down enough for a clear victory. Roberts and Parchment battled to the line with Parchment getting the knod for silver. After the race, Holloway walked around the stadium showing 3 fingers to indicate this was three times in a row.

== Records ==
Before the competition records were as follows:

| Record | Athlete & Nat. | Perf. | Location | Date |
|---|---|---|---|---|
| World record | Aries Merritt (USA) | 12.80 | Brussels, Belgium | 7 September 2012 |
| Championship record | Colin Jackson (GBR) | 12.91 | Stuttgart, Germany | 20 August 1993 |
| World Leading | Rasheed Broadbell (JAM) | 12.94 | Kingston, Jamaica | 9 July 2023 |
| African Record | Antonio Alkana (RSA) | 13.11 | Prague, Czech Republic | 5 June 2017 |
| Asian Record | Liu Xiang (CHN) | 12.88 | Lausanne, Switzerland | 11 July 2006 |
| North, Central American and Caribbean record | Aries Merritt (USA) | 12.80 | Brussels, Belgium | 7 September 2012 |
| South American Record | Rafael Pereira (BRA) | 13.17 | Rio de Janeiro, Brazil | 23 June 2022 |
| European Record | Colin Jackson (GBR) | 12.91 | Stuttgart, Germany | 20 August 1993 |
| Oceanian record | Kyle Vander-Kuyp (AUS) | 13.29 | Gothenburg, Sweden | 11 August 1995 |

== Qualification standard ==
The standard to qualify automatically for entry was 13.28 seconds.

== Schedule ==
The event schedule, in local time (UTC+2), was as follows:

| Date | Time | Round |
|---|---|---|
| 20 August | 13:05 | Heats |
| 21 August | 20:05 | Semi-finals |
| 21 August | 21:40 | Final |

== Results ==
=== Round 1 (heats) ===
Round 1 took place on 20 August, with the 45 athletes involved being split into 5 heats of 9 athletes each. The first 4 athletes in each heat ( Q ) and the next 4 fastest ( q ) qualified for the semi-final. The overall results were as follows:

Wind:
Heat 1: −0.3 m/s, Heat 2: +0.5 m/s, Heat 3: 0.0 m/s, Heat 4: −0.6 m/s, Heat 5: −0.9 m/s

| Rank | Heat | Name | Nationality | Time | Notes |
|---|---|---|---|---|---|
| 1 | 4 | Grant Holloway | United States | 13.18 | Q |
| 2 | 3 | Louis François Mendy | Senegal | 13.24 | Q |
| 3 | 1 | Hansle Parchment | Jamaica | 13.30 | Q |
| 4 | 2 | Wilhem Belocian | France | 13.31 | Q |
| 5 | 5 | Tade Ojora | Great Britain & N.I. | 13.32 | Q |
| 6 | 1 | Enrique Llopis | Spain | 13.33 [0.321] | Q, SB |
| 7 | 4 | Milan Trajković | Cyprus | 13.33 [0.325] | Q |
| 8 | 2 | Shunsuke Izumiya | Japan | 13.33 [0.329] | Q |
| 9 | 1 | Sasha Zhoya | France | 13.35 [0.343] | Q |
| 10 | 5 | Shunya Takayama | Japan | 13.35 [0.345] | Q |
| 11 | 5 | Daniel Roberts | United States | 13.36 | Q |
| 12 | 4 | Eduardo Rodrigues | Brazil | 13.37 | Q, SB |
| 13 | 4 | Jason Joseph | Switzerland | 13.38 | Q |
| 14 | 4 | Orlando Bennett | Jamaica | 13.39 | q |
| 15 | 3 | Freddie Crittenden | United States | 13.40 | Q |
| 16 | 5 | Max Hrelja | Sweden | 13.42 [0.411] | Q, PB |
| 17 | 5 | Just Kwaou-Mathey | France | 13.42 [0.416] | Q |
| 18 | 1 | Cordell Tinch | United States | 13.49 [0.487] | Q |
| 19 | 3 | Damian Czykier | Poland | 13.49 [0.488] | Q, SB |
| 20 | 3 | Lorenzo Ndele Simonelli | Italy | 13.50 | Q |
| 21 | 2 | Rafael Pereira | Brazil | 13.52 | Q |
| 22 | 2 | Hassane Fofana | Italy | 13.53 | Q |
| 23 | 1 | Yaqoub Al-Youha | Kuwait | 13.56 [0.556] | q |
| 24 | 4 | Yves Cherubini | Haiti | 13.56 [0.559] | q, PB |
| 25 | 5 | Gabriel Constantino | Brazil | 13.58 | |
| 26 | 2 | Finley Gaio | Switzerland | 13.61 | |
| 27 | 4 | Jakub Szymański | Poland | 13.65 | |
| 28 | 3 | Jacob McCorry | Australia | 13.67 | |
| 29 | 2 | Richard Diawara | Mali | 13.68 [0.671] | PB |
| 30 | 1 | Joel Bengtsson | Sweden | 13.68 [0.677] | |
| 31 | 5 | Elmo Lakka | Finland | 13.69 [0.681] | |
| 32 | 2 | Zhu Shenglong | China | 13.69 [0.684] | |
| 33 | 1 | Badamassi Saguirou | Niger | 13.70 | |
| 34 | 3 | Chen Kuei-ru | Chinese Taipei | 13.72 | |
| 35 | 1 | Bálint Szeles | Hungary | 13.77 | |
| 36 | 4 | David Yefremov | Kazakhstan | 13.78 | |
| 37 | 5 | Amine Bouanani | Algeria | 13.90 | |
| 38 | 4 | Mikdat Sevler | Turkey | 13.92 [0.912] | |
| 39 | 5 | Nick Andrews | Australia | 13.92 [0.916] | |
| 40 | 3 | Rasheem Brown | Cayman Islands | 14.02 | |
| 41 | 2 | Krzysztof Kiljan | Poland | 14.09 | |
| 42 | 1 | Antonio Alkana | South Africa | 14.25 | |
| 43 | 3 | Taiga Yokochi | Japan | 14.39 | qR |
| | 2 | Jeremie Lararaudeuse | Mauritius | DNF | |
| | 3 | Rasheed Broadbell | Jamaica | DQ | |

=== Semi-final ===
The semi-final took place on 21 August, with the 25 athletes involved being split into 3 heats. The first 2 athletes in each heat ( Q ) and the next 2 fastest ( q ) qualified for the final. The overall results were as follows:

Wind:
Heat 1: −0.2 m/s, Heat 2: −0.2 m/s, Heat 3: −0.1 m/s

| Rank | Heat | Name | Nationality | Time | Notes |
|---|---|---|---|---|---|
| 1 | 2 | Grant Holloway | United States | 13.02 | Q |
| 2 | 2 | Sasha Zhoya | France | 13.15 | Q, PB |
| 3 | 1 | Shunsuke Izumiya | Japan | 13.16 | Q |
| 4 | 3 | Freddie Crittenden | United States | 13.17 | Q, SB |
| 5 | 3 | Hansle Parchment | Jamaica | 13.18 | Q |
| 6 | 1 | Daniel Roberts | United States | 13.19 | Q |
| 7 | 3 | Wilhem Belocian | France | 13.23 | q |
| 8 | 3 | Jason Joseph | Switzerland | 13.25 | q |
| 9 | 2 | Enrique Llopis | Spain | 13.30 | PB |
| 10 | 2 | Cordell Tinch | United States | 13.31 [0.306] | |
| 11 | 1 | Just Kwaou-Mathey | France | 13.31 [0.308] | |
| 12 | 2 | Milan Trajković | Cyprus | 13.33 | |
| 13 | 3 | Shunya Takayama | Japan | 13.34 [0.334] | |
| 14 | 1 | Orlando Bennett | Jamaica | 13.34 [0.335] | |
| 15 | 1 | Tade Ojora | Great Britain & N.I. | 13.43 | |
| 16 | 3 | Yaqoub Al-Youha | Kuwait | 13.44 | SB |
| 17 | 3 | Hassane Fofana | Italy | 13.50 | |
| 18 | 2 | Eduardo Rodrigues | Brazil | 13.52 [0.511] | |
| 19 | 3 | Rafael Pereira | Brazil | 13.52 [0.515] | |
| 20 | 1 | Max Hrelja | Sweden | 13.60 | |
| 21 | 2 | Yves Cherubin | Haiti | 13.66 | |
| 22 | 2 | Lorenzo Ndele Simonelli | Italy | 13.69 | |
| 23 | 1 | Damian Czykier | Poland | 13.97 | |
| 24 | 2 | Taiga Yokochi | Japan | 14.93 | |
| | 1 | Louis François Mendy | Senegal | DQ | TR 16.8 |

=== Final ===
The final was started at 21:43 on 21 August. The results were as follows:

Wind: 0.0 m/s

| Rank | Lane | Name | Nationality | Time | Notes |
|---|---|---|---|---|---|
| 1st place, gold medalist(s) | 5 | Grant Holloway | United States | 12.96 | SB |
| 2nd place, silver medalist(s) | 8 | Hansle Parchment | Jamaica | 13.07 | SB |
| 3rd place, bronze medalist(s) | 3 | Daniel Roberts | United States | 13.09 | |
| 4 | 4 | Freddie Crittenden | United States | 13.16 | SB |
| 5 | 6 | Shunsuke Izumiya | Japan | 13.19 | |
| 6 | 7 | Sasha Zhoya | France | 13.26 | |
| 7 | 9 | Jason Joseph | Switzerland | 13.28 | |
| 8 | 2 | Wilhem Belocian | France | 13.32 | |
