= Athletics at the 2019 African Games – Men's 110 metres hurdles =

The men's 110 metres hurdles event at the 2019 African Games was held on 26 and 27 August in Rabat.

== Medalists ==
| Gold | Silver | Bronze |
|---|---|---|
| Amine Bouanani; Algeria | Oyeniyi Abejoye; Nigeria | Louis François Mendy; Senegal |

== Results ==
=== Heats ===
Qualification: First 3 in each heat (Q) and the next 2 fastest (q) advanced to the final.

Wind:
Heat 1: -0.8 m/s, Heat 2: -0.8 m/s

| Rank | Heat | Name | Nationality | Time | Notes |
|---|---|---|---|---|---|
| 1 | 1 | Louis François Mendy | Senegal | 13.70 | Q |
| 2 | 1 | Amine Bouanani | Algeria | 13.74 | Q |
| 3 | 1 | Oyeniyi Abejoye | Nigeria | 13.93 | Q |
| 4 | 2 | Lyes Mokddel | Algeria | 13.98 | Q |
| 5 | 2 | Kemorena Tisang | Botswana | 14.03 | Q |
| 6 | 2 | Wellington Zaza | Liberia | 14.08 | Q |
| 7 | 2 | Jeremie Lararaudeuse | Mauritius | 14.21 | q |
| 8 | 2 | Ramy Elmahdy | Egypt | 14.35 | q |
| 9 | 1 | Floriant Somé | Burkina Faso | 14.40 | |
| 10 | 1 | Edson Oliveira | Angola | 14.44 | |
| 11 | 1 | Ibrahim Jemal | Ethiopia | 14.49 | |
| 12 | 2 | William Mbevi Mutunga | Kenya | 14.88 | |
| 13 | 2 | Samuel Esubalew | Ethiopia | 15.94 | |

=== Final ===
Wind: +0.4 m/s

| Rank | Lane | Name | Nationality | Time | Notes |
|---|---|---|---|---|---|
| 1st place, gold medalist(s) | 4 | Amine Bouanani | Algeria | 13.60 | |
| 2nd place, silver medalist(s) | 9 | Oyeniyi Abejoye | Nigeria | 13.90 | |
| 3rd place, bronze medalist(s) | 7 | Louis François Mendy | Senegal | 14.05 | |
| 4 | 8 | Wellington Zaza | Liberia | 14.10 | |
| 5 | 3 | Jeremie Lararaudeuse | Mauritius | 14.22 | |
| 6 | 2 | Ramy Elmahdy | Egypt | 14.27 | |
| | 5 | Lyes Mokddel | Algeria | DQ | |
| | 6 | Kemorena Tisang | Botswana | DQ | |
