= Richard Diawara =

Malian hurdler (born 1995)

Personal information
- Nationality: Malian
- Born: Richard Diawara Matingou; 21 April 1995 (age 31)

Sport
- Sport: Track and field
- Event: 110 metres hurdles

Achievements and titles
- Personal best(s): 60m hurdles: 7.78 (Val-de-Reuil, 2023); 110m hurdles 13.68 (Budapest, 2023)
Medal record
Men's athletics
Representing Mali
Francophone Games
Bronze medal – third place	2023 Kinsasha	110 m hurdles

Richard Diawara Matingou (born 21 April 1995) is a track and field athlete who competes in the sprint hurdles for Mali. He has representing the country at multiple World Championships, qualifying for the semi-finals in the 60 metres hurdles at the 2024 and 2025 World Indoor Championships.

== Biography ==
Diawara had his change of international affiliation from France to Mali ratified in 2022. In March 2022, he competed at the World Athletics Indoor Championships in Belgrade, Serbia, in the 60m hurdles. In July 2022, he competed at the 2022 World Athletics Championships in Eugene, Oregon in the 110 metres hurdles.

Diawara was a bronze medalist in the 110m hurdles at the 2023 Jeux de la Francophonie, in Kinshasa, Democratic Republic of Congo, finishing behind the Senegalese runner Louis François Mendy and Badamassi Saguirou of Niger. In August 2023, he competed at the 2023 World Athletics Championships in Budapest, Hungary, in the 110m hurdles, where he ran a personal best time of 13.68 seconds.

Diawara was selected the 2024 World Athletics Championships in Glasgow, Scotland, where he qualified for the semi-finals of the 60 metres hurdles.

Competing at the 2025 World Athletics Indoor Championships in Nanjing, China, in March 2025, he qualified for the semi-finals with a time of 7.79 seconds. In his semi-final he ran 7.79 seconds again, but did not progress through to the final. In September 2025, he competed at the 2025 World Athletics Championships in the men's 110 metres hurdles in Tokyo, Japan, without advancing to the semi-finals.

In March 2026, he competed over 60 metres hurdles at the 2026 World Athletics Indoor Championships.

== International competitions ==
Year	Competition	Venue	Position	Event	Notes
Representing Mali
2022	World Indoor Championships	Belgrade, Serbia	42nd (h)	60 m hurdles	7.98
2022	World Indoor Championships	Belgrade, Serbia	38th (h)	60 m hurdles	14.35
2023	Jeux de la Francophonie	Kinshasa, DR Congo	3rd	110 m hurdles	13.69
2023	World Championships	Budapest, Hungary	29th (h)	110 m hurdles	13.68
2024	World Indoor Championships	Glasgow, United Kingdom	22nd (sf)	60 m hurdles	7.89
2024	African Championships	Douala, Cameroon	12th (h)	110 m hurdles	14.19
2025	World Indoor Championships	Nanjing, China	16th (sf)	60 m hurdles	7.79
2025	World Championships	Tokyo, Japan	38th (h)	110 m hurdles	13.89
2026	World Indoor Championships	Toruń, Poland	36th (h)	60 m hurdles	7.82
