= Shenlong (disambiguation) =

Shenlong is a dragon from Chinese mythology.

Shenlong may also refer to:

- Shenlong (spacecraft), a Chinese reusable space shuttle
- Shenlong (Dragon Ball), a character in Dragon Ball media
- Shenlong (Bloody Roar), a character in Bloody Roar media
- Shenlong Gundam, a fictional mecha in Gundam Wing media

== See also ==
- Sheng Long
- Shenglong
