= Pascal Martinot-Lagarde =

French hurdler

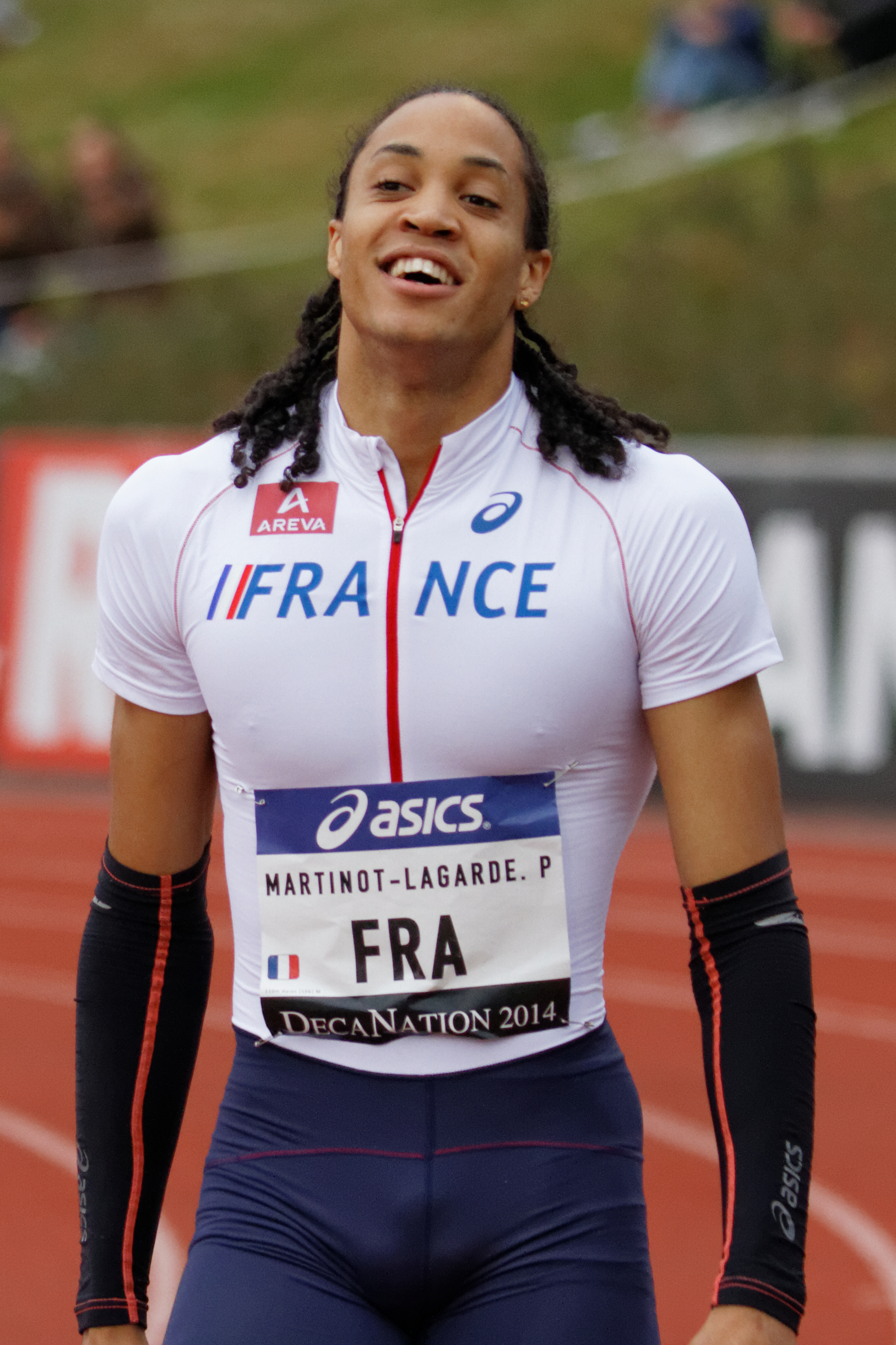
- Martinot-Lagarde in 2014

Personal information
- Nationality: French
- Born: 22 September 1991 (age 35) Saint-Maur-des-Fossés, France
- Height: 1.89 m (6 ft 2 in)
- Weight: 85 kg (187 lb)

Sport
- Country: France
- Sport: Athletics
- Event: 110 metres hurdles
- Coached by: Benjamin Crouzet

Achievements and titles
- Personal best: 110 m h: 12.95 (Monaco 2014)
Medal record
Men's athletics
Representing France
World Championships
Bronze medal – third place	2019 Doha	110 m hurdles
World Indoor Championships
Silver medal – second place	2014 Sopot	60 m hurdles
Silver medal – second place	2016 Portland	60 m hurdles
Silver medal – second place	2022 Belgrade	60 m hurdles
Bronze medal – third place	2012 Istanbul	60 m hurdles
European Championships
Gold medal – first place	2018 Berlin	110 m hurdles
Silver medal – second place	2022 Munich	110 m hurdles
Bronze medal – third place	2014 Zürich	110 m hurdles
European Indoor Championships
Gold medal – first place	2015 Prague	60 m hurdles
Silver medal – second place	2017 Belgrade	60 m hurdles
Silver medal – second place	2019 Glasgow	60 m hurdles
Bronze medal – third place	2013 Gothenburg	60 m hurdles
World Junior Championships
Gold medal – first place	2010 Moncton	110 m hurdles
Representing Europe
Continental Cup
Bronze medal – third place	2018 Ostrava	110 m hurdles

Pascal Martinot-Lagarde (born 22 September 1991) is a French athlete who specialises in the sprint hurdles.

Born to a French father and a mother from the Ivory Coast, he has written his name in his country's record books.

He is a three-time medalist in the 60 metres hurdles at the IAAF World Indoor Championships and also won the bronze medal in the 110 metres at the 2014 European Championships and the gold medal at the 2018 European Championships in the same event. He also won the bronze medal at the 2019 World Championships.

He set his personal best of 12.95 seconds in July 2014 in Monaco. His brother Thomas, also a promising hurdler, similarly achieved a personal best at the same meeting.

== International competitions ==
Year	Competition	Venue	Position	Event	Notes
Representing France
2009	European Junior Championships	Novi Sad, Serbia	4th	110 m hurdles (99 cm)	13.45
2010	World Junior Championships	Moncton, Canada	1st	110 m hurdles (99 cm)	13.52 (−2.4 m/s)
2011	European U23 Championships	Ostrava, Czech Republic	20th (h)	110 m hurdles	14.33 (−0.6 m/s)
2012	World Indoor Championships	Istanbul, Turkey	3rd	60 m hurdles	7.53
2013	European Indoor Championships	Gothenburg, Sweden	3rd	60 m hurdles	7.53
2013	World Championships	Moscow, Russia	22nd (h)	110 m hurdles	13.63
2014	World Indoor Championships	Sopot, Poland	2nd	60 m hurdles	7.46
2014	European Championships	Zürich, Switzerland	3rd	110 m hurdles	13.29
2015	European Indoor Championships	Prague, Czech Republic	1st	60 m hurdles	7.49
2015	World Championships	Beijing, China	4th	110m hurdles	13.17
2016	World Indoor Championships	Portland, United States	2nd	60 m hurdles	7.46
2016	Olympic Games	Rio de Janeiro, Brazil	4th	110 m hurdles	13.29
2017	European Indoor Championships	Belgrade, Serbia	2nd	60 m hurdles	7.52
2018	World Indoor Championships	Birmingham, United Kingdom	5th	60 m hurdles	7.68
2018	European Championships	Berlin, Germany	1st	110 m hurdles	13.17
2019	European Indoor Championships	Glasgow, United Kingdom	2nd	60 m hurdles	7.61
2019	World Championships	Doha, Qatar	3rd	110 m hurdles	13.18
2021	Olympic Games	Tokyo, Japan	5th	110 m hurdles	13.16
2022	World Indoor Championships	Belgrade, Serbia	2nd	60 m hurdles	7.50
2022	World Championships	Eugene, United States	13th (sf)	110 m hurdles	13.40
2022	European Championships	Munich, Germany	2nd	110 m hurdles	13.14
2023	European Indoor Championships	Istanbul, Turkey	9th (h)	60 m hurdles	7.79
2025	World Indoor Championships	Nanjing, China	13th (sf)	60 m hurdles	7.69

== Personal best ==
Distance	Time	venue
110 m hurdles	12.95	Monaco, Principality of Monaco (18 July 2014)
60 m hurdles	7.45	Mondeville, France (1 February 2014)
