= 2024 World Athletics Indoor Championships – Men's 60 metres hurdles =

Men's 60 metres hurdles at the 2024 World Athletics Indoor Championships
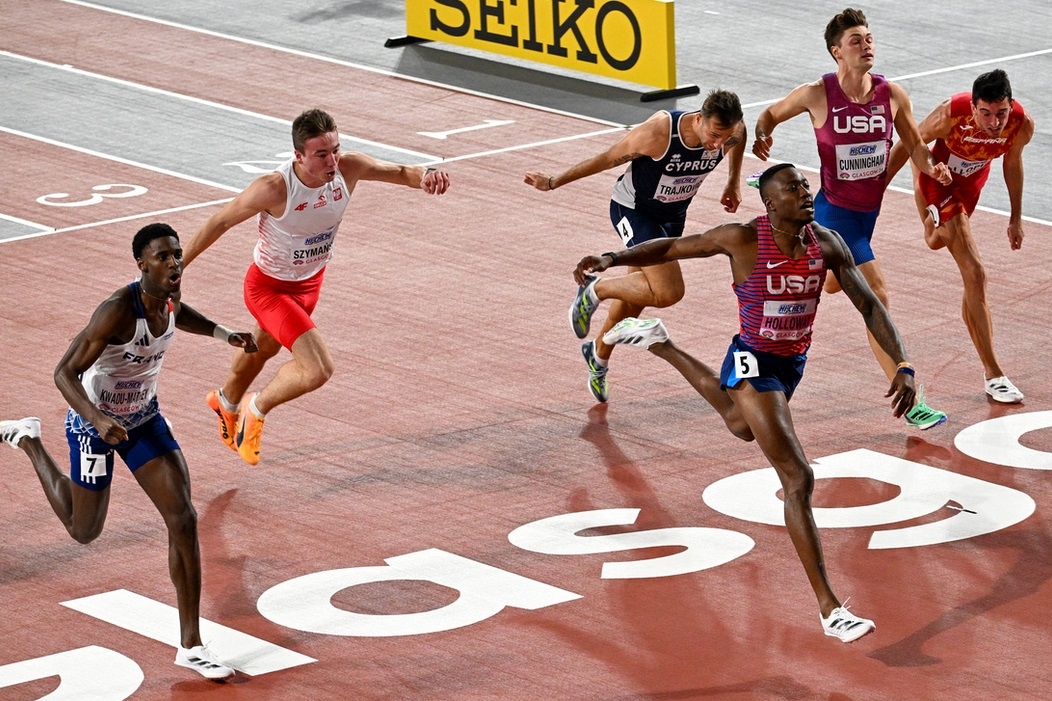
- Finish of the final
- Venue: Commonwealth Arena
- Dates: 2 March
- Competitors: 42 from 30 nations
- Winning time: 7.29 CR

Medalists
gold medal	Grant Holloway	United States
silver medal	Lorenzo Simonelli	Italy
bronze medal	Just Kwaou-Mathey	France

The men's 60 metres hurdles at the 2024 World Athletics Indoor Championships took place on 2 March 2024.

The winning margin was 0.14 seconds which is the greatest winning margin in the men's 60 metres hurdles at these championships.

== Results ==
=== Heats ===
Qualification: First 3 in each heat (Q) and the next 6 fastest (q) advance to the Semi-Finals. The heats were started at 10:05.

==== Heat 1 ====
Rank	Lane	Athlete	Nation	Time	Notes
1	3	Grant Holloway	United States	7.43	Q
2	5	Zhu Shenglong	China	7.76	Q, SB
3	7	Richard Diawara	Mali	7.80	Q, SB
4	2	Martín Sáenz	Chile	7.88	
5	8	François Grailet	Luxembourg	8.10	
6	4	Rafael Pereira	Brazil	8.65	SB
—	—	Yaqoub Al-Youha	Kuwait	DNS	

==== Heat 2 ====
Rank	Lane	Athlete	Nation	Time	Notes
1	5	Wilhem Belocian	France	7.47	Q
2	4	Asier Martínez	Spain	7.62	Q
3	6	David King	Great Britain	7.64	Q
4	8	Mathieu Jaquet	Switzerland	7.68	q
5	7	Elie Bacari	Belgium	7.69	q
6	3	Damion Thomas	Jamaica	7.73	
7	2	Mikdat Sevler	Turkey	7.80	

==== Heat 3 ====
Rank	Lane	Athlete	Nation	Time	Notes
1	3	Just Kwaou-Mathey	France	7.52	Q
2	6	Jakub Szymański	Poland	7.57	Q
3	2	Cameron Murray	United States	7.61	Q
4	4	John Cabang	Philippines	7.72	q
5	5	Tade Ojora	Great Britain	7.78	
6	7	Konstantinos Douvalidis	Greece	7.79	
7	8	Zaid Al-Awamleh	Jordan	8.06	

==== Heat 4 ====
Rank	Lane	Athlete	Nation	Time	Notes
1	5	Milan Trajkovic	Cyprus	7.59	Q, =SB
2	6	David Yefremov	Kazakhstan	7.64	Q
3	7	Job Geerds	Netherlands	7.66	Q
4	4	Elmo Lakka	Finland	7.67	q
5	2	Filip Jakob Demšar	Slovenia	7.80	
6	3	Tyler Mason	Jamaica	7.86	
—	8	Petr Svoboda	Czech Republic	DNF	

==== Heat 5 ====
Rank	Lane	Athlete	Nation	Time	Notes
1	6	Lorenzo Simonelli	Italy	7.61	Q
2	4	Enrique Llopis	Spain	7.66	Q
3	5	Krzysztof Kiljan	Poland	7.67	Q
4	2	Jérémie Lararaudeuse	Mauritius	7.75	
5	3	Amine Bouanani	Algeria	7.81	SB
6	7	Bálint Szeles	Hungary	7.86	
7	8	Mosese Foliaki	Tonga	8.51	NR

==== Heat 6 ====
Rank	Lane	Athlete	Nation	Time	Notes
1	6	Trey Cunningham	United States	7.59	Q
2	4	Jason Joseph	Switzerland	7.62	Q
3	5	Michael Obasuyi	Belgium	7.66	Q
4	2	Liu Junxi	China	7.71 [.702]	q
5	3	Eduardo de Deus	Brazil	7.71 [.710]	q
6	7	Štěpán Schubert	Czech Republic	7.88	
7	8	Darko Pešić	Montenegro	8.37	

=== Semi-finals ===
Qualification: First 2 in each heat (Q) and the next 2 fastest (q) advance to the Final. The heats were started at 19:10.

==== Heat 1 ====
Rank	Lane	Athlete	Nation	Time	Notes
1	4	Milan Trajkovic	Cyprus	7.53	Q, SB
2	6	Just Kwaou-Mathey	France	7.54 [.534]	Q
3	2	Michael Obasuyi	Belgium	7.54 [.534]	Q, NR
4	7	Cameron Murray	United States	7.56	
5	8	Liu Junxi	China	7.64	
6	3	David Yefremov	Kazakhstan	7.68	
7	1	Mathieu Jaquet	Switzerland	7.74	
—	5	Asier Martínez	Spain	DQ	

==== Heat 2 ====
Rank	Lane	Athlete	Nation	Time	Notes
1	4	Trey Cunningham	United States	7.49	Q
2	2	Enrique Llopis	Spain	7.53	Q
3	1	Elie Bacari	Belgium	7.58	PB
4	3	Wilhem Belocian	France	7.64	
5	7	David King	Great Britain	7.65	
6	2	Krzysztof Kiljan	Poland	7.66	
7	8	Eduardo de Deus	Brazil	7.68	
8	5	Jason Joseph	Switzerland	7.81	

==== Heat 3 ====
Rank	Lane	Athlete	Nation	Time	Notes
1	4	Grant Holloway	United States	7.32	Q
2	6	Jakub Szymański	Poland	7.46	Q, NR
3	5	Lorenzo Simonelli	Italy	7.48	Q
4	7	Job Geerds	Netherlands	7.62	
5	8	John Cabang	Philippines	7.68	
6	1	Elmo Lakka	Finland	7.70	
7	2	Richard Diawara	Mali	7.89	
—	3	Zhu Shenglong	China	DQ	

=== Final ===
The final was started at 21:31.

Rank	Lane	Name	Nationality	Time	Notes
1st place, gold medalist(s)	5	Grant Holloway	United States	7.29	=CR
2nd place, silver medalist(s)	1	Lorenzo Simonelli	Italy	7.43	NR
3rd place, bronze medalist(s)	7	Just Kwaou-Mathey	France	7.47	
4	2	Enrique Llopis	Spain	7.53 [.524]	
5	6	Jakub Szymański	Poland	7.53 [.527]	
6	3	Trey Cunningham	United States	7.53 [.529]	
7	8	Michael Obasuyi	Belgium	7.55	
8	4	Milan Trajkovic	Cyprus	7.59	
