= 2026 African Championships in Athletics – Men's 110 metres hurdles =

Men's 110 metres hurdles at the 2026 African Championships in Athletics
- Venue: Legon Sports Stadium
- Location: Accra, Ghana
- Dates: 15–16 May
- Winning time: 13.73

Medalists
gold medal	Saguirou Badamassi	Niger
silver medal	Louis François Mendy	Senegal
bronze medal	Youssef Badawy Sayed	Egypt

The men's 110 metres hurdles event at the 2026 African Championships in Athletics was held on 15 and 16 May in Accra, Ghana.

== Results ==
=== Heats ===
First 3 of each heat (Q) and the next 2 fastest (q) qualified for the final.
Wind:
Heat 1: -1.1 m/s, Heat 2: -0.4 m/s

Rank	Heat	Athlete	Nationality	Time	Notes
1	2	Louis François Mendy	Senegal	13.65	Q
2	1	Saguirou Badamassi	Niger	13.76	Q
3	1	Youssef Badawy Sayed	Egypt	13.91	Q
4	1	Lansana Marico	Senegal	13.98	Q
5	1	Kemorena Tisang	Botswana	14.02	q
6	2	Nnamdi Onwaeze	Nigeria	14.09	Q
7	2	Mohamed Wael Gamil	Egypt	14.32	Q
8	1	Usumane Djumo	Guinea-Bissau	14.36	q
9	1	Philippe Djo Petitjean	Togo	14.59	
10	2	Getahun Tadese	Ethiopia	14.74	
	1	Denmar Jacobs	South Africa	DQ	FS
	1	Aurel Manga	Cameroon	DNS	
	2	Matteo Ngo	Cameroon	DNS	
	2	Kessa Lekoungou	Republic of the Congo	DNS	

=== Final ===
Wind: -2.0 m/s

Rank	Heat	Athlete	Nationality	Time	Notes
1st place, gold medalist(s)	6	Saguirou Badamassi	Niger	13.73	
2nd place, silver medalist(s)	5	Louis François Mendy	Senegal	13.81	
3rd place, bronze medalist(s)	3	Youssef Badawy Sayed	Egypt	13.82	
4	1	Kemorena Tisang	Botswana	14.10	
5	2	Lansana Marico	Senegal	14.16	
6	7	Mohamed Wael Gamil	Egypt	14.30	
7	4	Nnamdi Onwaeze	Nigeria	14.37	
8	8	Usumane Djumo	Guinea-Bissau	14.77	
