= Shenglong =

Shenglong (Chinese: 胜龙) is a Chinese given name. Notable people with the name include:

- Jiang Shenglong (born 2000), Chinese footballer
- Li Shenglong (born 1992), Chinese footballer
- Zhu Shenglong (born 2000), Chinese hurdler
