= Milan Trajkovic =

Cypriot hurdler (born 1992)

Milan Trajković
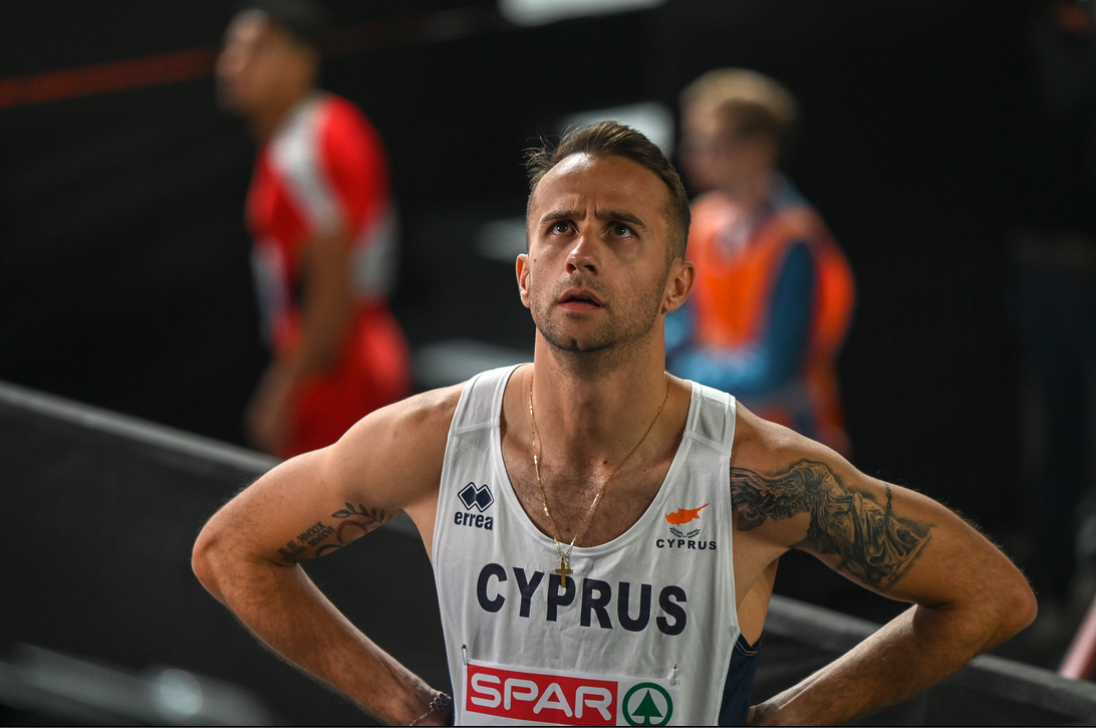
- Milan Trajković in 2023

Personal information
- Born: 17 March 1992 (age 34) Surdulica, SR Serbia, SFR Yugoslavia
- Education: Cyprus University of Technology
- Height: 1.87 m (6 ft 2 in)
- Weight: 82 kg (181 lb)

Sport
- Sport: Track and field
- Event: 110 metres hurdles
Medal record
European Indoor Championships
Gold medal – first place	2019 Glasgow	60 m hurdles
European Games
Silver medal – second place	2023 Kraków-Małopolska	110 m hurdles
Mediterranean Games
Gold medal – first place	2022 Oran	110 m hurdles
Silver medal – second place	2026 Taranto	110 m hurdles
Commonwealth Games
Bronze medal – third place	2026 Glasgow	110 m hurdles

Milan Trajković (Serbian: Милан Трајковић, Greek: Μίλαν Τράικοβιτς, born 17 March 1992) is a Serbian-born Cypriot athlete specialising in the sprint hurdles. He has won two gold medals at the Games of the Small States of Europe.

== Biography ==
Trajković was raised in the Serbian town of Surdulica but emigrated with his family to Cyprus at the age of nine as a result of the NATO bombing of Yugoslavia.

At the 2016 Rio Olympics, he qualified for the final of Men's 110 metres hurdles with times of 13.41 seconds and 13.31 in the semi-finals. With this qualification, Trajković became the first Cypriot athlete to qualify for this event at the Olympic Games.

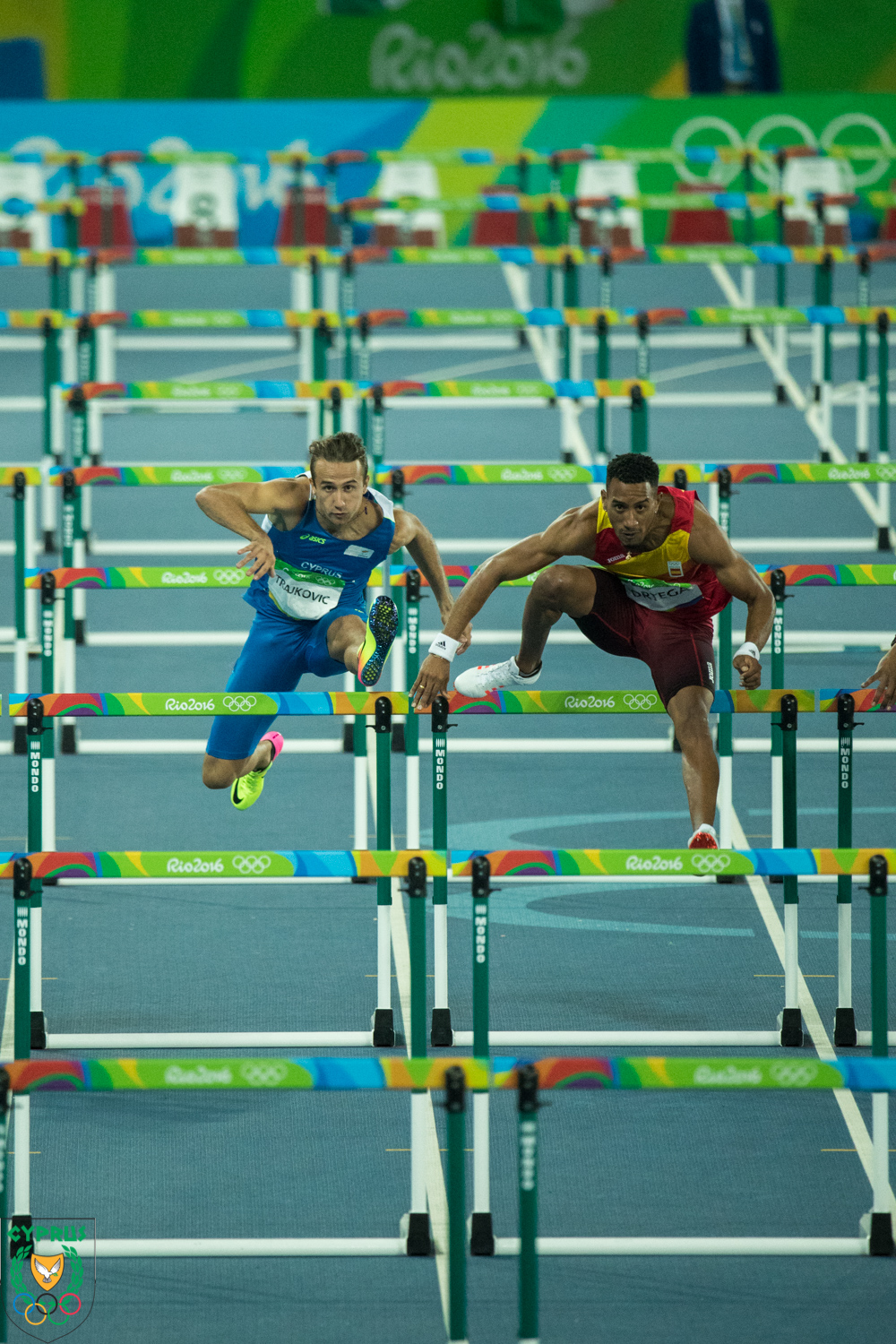
Milan Trajković representing Cyprus in the 110m hurdles finals at the 2016 Olympic Games in Rio de Janeiro.

His personal bests are 13.25 seconds in the 110 metres hurdles (0.0 m/s, London 2017) and 7.51 seconds in the 60 metres hurdles (Birmingham, 2018). Both are current national records.

== Competition record ==
Year	Competition	Venue	Position	Event	Notes
Representing Cyprus
2011	European Junior Championships	Tallinn, Estonia	19th (sf)	110 m hurdles (99 cm)	14.49
2013	European Indoor Championships	Gothenburg, Sweden	25th (h)	60 m hurdles	7.95
2013	Games of the Small States of Europe	Luxembourg, Luxembourg	1st	110 m hurdles	14.03
2013	European U23 Championships	Tampere, Finland	8th	110 m hurdles	14.22
2014	Commonwealth Games	Glasgow, United Kingdom	14th (h)	110 m hurdles	13.95
2014	European Championships	Zurich, Switzerland	24th (h)	110 m hurdles	13.78
2015	European Indoor Championships	Prague, Czech Republic	19th (h)	60 m hurdles	7.83
2015	Games of the Small States of Europe	Reykjavík, Iceland	1st	110 m hurdles	13.86
2015	Universiade	Gwangju, South Korea	6th	110 m hurdles	13.78
2016	European Championships	Amsterdam, Netherlands	5th	110 m hurdles	13.44
2016	Olympic Games	Rio de Janeiro, Brazil	7th	110 m hurdles	13.41
2017	European Indoor Championships	Belgrade, Serbia	6th	60 m hurdles	7.60
2017	World Championships	London, United Kingdom	11th (sf)	110 m hurdles	13.32
2018	World Indoor Championships	Birmingham, United Kingdom	2nd (sf)	60 m hurdles	7.51^{1}
2018	Commonwealth Games	Gold Coast, Australia	4th	110 m hurdles	13.42
2018	European Championships	Berlin, Germany	15th (sf)	110 m hurdles	13.57
2019	European Indoor Championships	Glasgow, United Kingdom	1st	60 m hurdles	7.60
2019	World Championships	Doha, Qatar	8th	110 m hurdles	13.87
2021	European Indoor Championships	Toruń, Poland	17th (sf)	60 m hurdles	7.78
2021	Olympic Games	Tokyo, Japan	23rd (sf)	110 m hurdles	14.01
2022	World Indoor Championships	Belgrade, Serbia	7th	60 m hurdles	7.62
2022	Mediterranean Games	Oran, Algeria	1st	110 m hurdles	13.34
2022	World Championships	Eugene, United States	19th (sf)	110 m hurdles	13.49
2022	European Championships	Munich, Germany	9th (sf)	110 m hurdles	13.54
2023	European Indoor Championships	Istanbul, Turkey	9th (sf)	60 m hurdles	7.73
2023	World Championships	Budapest, Hungary	12th (sf)	110 m hurdles	13.33
2024	World Indoor Championships	Glasgow, United Kingdom	8th	60 m hurdles	7.59
2024	Olympic Games	Paris, France	9th (sf)	110 m hurdles	13.32
2026	World Indoor Championships	Toruń, Poland	18th (h)	60 m hurdles	7.66^{2}
2026	Commonwealth Games	Glasgow, United Kingdom	3rd	110 m hurdles	13.32
2026	European Championships	Birmingham, United Kingdom	8th	110 m hurdles	13.87
2026	Mediterranean Games	Taranto, Italy	2nd	110 m hurdles	13.25

^{1}Disqualified in the final
^{2}Disqualified in the semifinals
