= Eduardo de Deus =

Brazilian hurdler (born 1995)

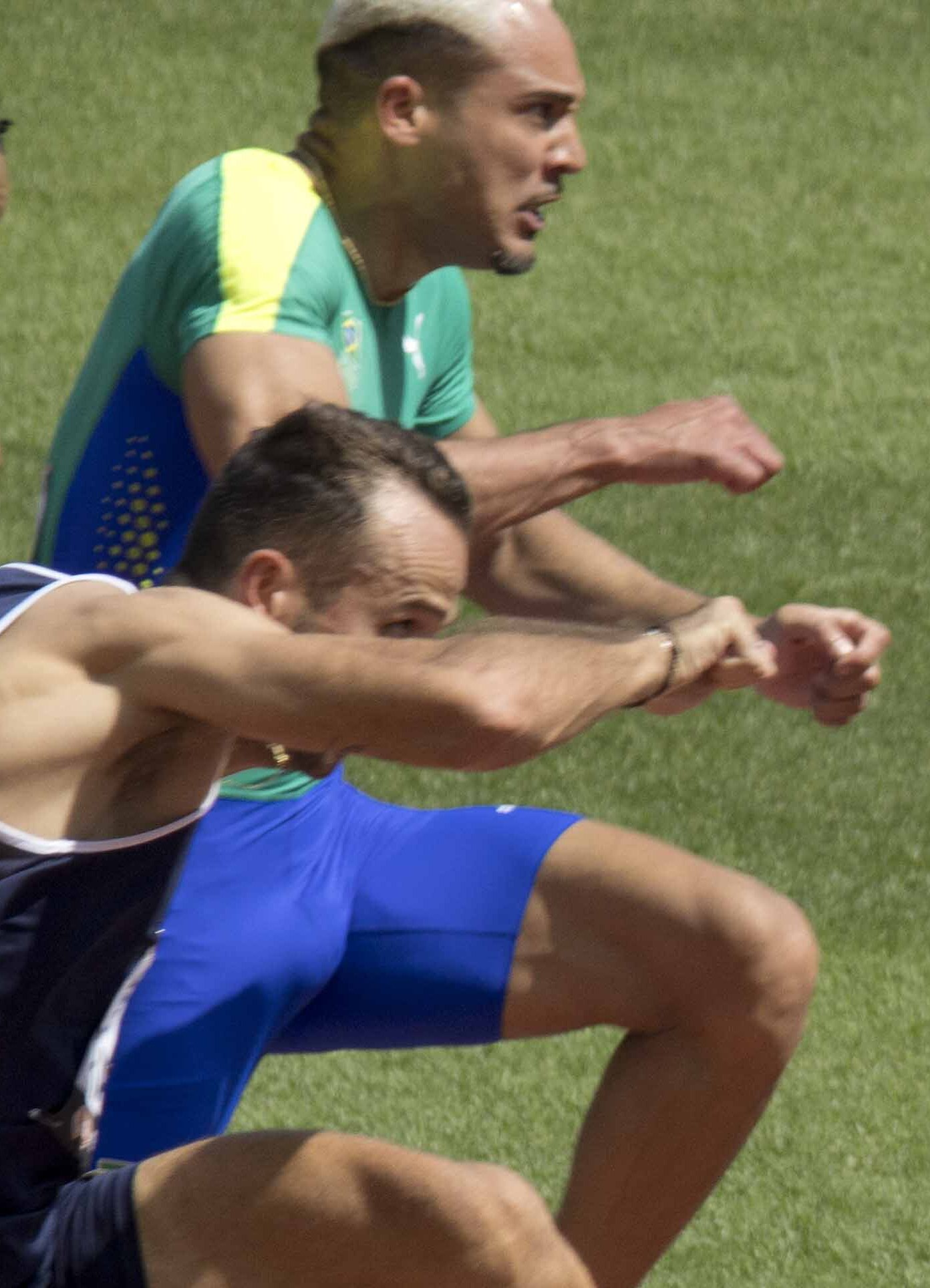
- Eduardo de Deus (background) in 2023

Personal information
- Full name: Eduardo Rodrigues dos Santos de Deus Junior
- Born: 8 October 1995 (age 30) Campinas, Brazil

Sport
- Sport: Athletics
- Event: 110 metres hurdles
- Club: Orcampi Unimed
- Coached by: Katsuhiko Nakaya
Medal record
Men's athletics
Representing Brazil
Pan American Games
Gold medal – first place	2023 Santiago	110 m hurdles
Bronze medal – third place	2019 Lima	110 m hurdles

Eduardo Rodrigues dos Santos de Deus Junior (born 8 October 1995) is a Brazilian specialising in the high hurdles. He won a bronze medal at the 2019 Pan American Games.

His personal bests are 13.27 seconds in the 110 metres hurdles (+0.7 m/s, São Paulo 2022) and 7.72 seconds in the 60 metres hurdles (Cascavel 2022).

He qualified to represent Brazil at the 2020 Summer Olympics.

== Personal bests ==
- 110 m hurdles: 13.27 (wind: +0.7 m/s) – (Brazil) São Paulo, 27 Apr 2022
- 60 m hurdles (indoor): 7.58 – (Bolivia) Cochabamba, 28 Jan 2024

All information from World Athletics profile.

== International competitions ==
Year	Competition	Venue	Position	Event	Notes
Representing Brazil
2013	South American Junior Championships	Montevideo, Uruguay	2nd	110 m hurdles (99 cm)	13.84 (w)
2013	South American Junior Championships	Montevideo, Uruguay	3rd	400 m hurdles	53.78
2014	South American U23 Championships	Montevideo, Uruguay	2nd	110 m hurdles	13.85 (w)
2016	Ibero-American Championships	Rio de Janeiro, Brazil	2nd	110 m hurdles	13.56
2017	South American Championships	Asunción, Paraguay	1st	110 m hurdles	13.42 (w)
2018	South American Games	Cochabamba, Bolivia	1st	110 m hurdles	13.44
2019	South American Championships	Lima, Peru	3rd	110 m hurdles	13.68
2019	South American Championships	Lima, Peru	2nd	4 × 100 m relay	39.91
2019	Pan American Games	Lima, Peru	3rd	110 m hurdles	13.48
2019	World Championships	Doha, Qatar	32nd (h)	110 m hurdles	13.92
2020	South American Indoor Championships	Cochabamba, Bolivia	2nd	60 m hurdles	7.81
2021	South American Championships	Guayaquil, Ecuador	2nd (h)	110 m hurdles	13.64^{1}
2021	Olympic Games	Tokyo, Japan	33rd (h)	110 m hurdles	13.78
2022	Ibero-American Championships	La Nucía, Spain	3rd	110 m hurdles	13.53
2022	World Championships	Eugene, United States	21st (sf)	110 m hurdles	13.62
2022	South American Games	Asunción, Paraguay	1st	110 m hurdles	13.70
2023	South American Championships	São Paulo, Brazil	1st	110 m hurdles	13.59
2023	World Championships	Budapest, Hungary	18th (sf)	110 m hurdles	13.52
2023	Pan American Games	Santiago, Chile	1st	110 m hurdles	13.67
2024	South American Indoor Championships	Cochabamba, Bolivia	1st	60 m hurdles	7.58
2024	World Indoor Championships	Glasgow, United Kingdom	17th (sf)	60 m hurdles	7.68
2024	Ibero-American Championships	Cuiabá, Brazil	1st	110 m hurdles	13.24 (w)
2024	Olympic Games	Paris, France	20th (sf)	110 m hurdles	13.44
2025	South American Indoor Championships	Cochabamba, Bolivia	1st	60 m hurdles	7.67
2025	World Indoor Championships	Nanjing, China	20th (sf)	60 m hurdles	7.85
2025	South American Championships	Mar del Plata, Argentina	4th	110 m hurdles	13.99
2025	World Championships	Tokyo, Japan	21st (sf)	110 m hurdles	13.91
2026	South American Indoor Championships	Cochabamba, Bolivia	3rd	60 m hurdles	7.67
2026	World Indoor Championships	Toruń, Poland	31st (h)	60 m hurdles	7.77
2026	Pan American Championships	Medellín, Colombia	5th	110 m hurdles	13.57

^{1}Did not finish in the final
