= Athletics at the 2023 African Games – Men's 110 metres hurdles =

African men's sporting event

Men's 110 metres hurdles at the 2023 African Games
- Venue: Legon Sports Stadium
- Location: Accra, Ghana
- Dates: 18 March (heats); 19 March (final)
- Competitors: 13 from 12 nations
- Winning time: 13.61

Medalists
| gold medal | Louis François Mendy | Senegal |
| silver medal | Amine Bouanani | Algeria |
| bronze medal | Yousuf Badawy Sayyed | Egypt |

The men's 110 metres hurdles event at the 2023 African Games was held on 18 and 19 March 2024 in Accra, Ghana.

== Results ==
=== Heats ===
Held on 18 March
Qualification: First 3 in each heat (Q) and the next 2 fastest (q) advanced to the final.

Wind:
Heat 1: -1.0 m/s, Heat 2: -1.2 m/s

| Rank | Heat | Name | Nationality | Time | Notes |
|---|---|---|---|---|---|
| 1 | 2 | Louis François Mendy | Senegal | 13.54 | Q |
| 2 | 1 | Amine Bouanani | Algeria | 13.76 | Q |
| 3 | 2 | Saguirou Badamassi | Niger | 13.92 | Q |
| 4 | 1 | Yousuf Badawy Sayyed | Egypt | 13.99 | Q |
| 5 | 1 | Jérémie Lararaudeuse | Mauritius | 14.20 | Q |
| 6 | 2 | Wisdom Musa | Nigeria | 14.35 | Q |
| 7 | 2 | Kemorena Tisang | Botswana | 14.37 | q |
| 8 | 1 | Salam Ouédraogo | Burkina Faso | 14.54 | q |
| 9 | 2 | Derese Tesfaye | Ethiopia | 14.67 | |
| 10 | 1 | Amara Drame | Republic of the Congo | 14.71 | |
| 11 | 2 | Alexandre Landinaff | Mauritius | 14.88 | |
| 12 | 1 | Kipkorir Rotich | Kenya | 14.95 | |
| 13 | 1 | Yohannes Goshu | Ethiopia | 15.39 | |
| | 2 | Wiseman Mukhobe | Kenya | DNS | |

=== Final ===
Held on 19 March
Wind: -1.1 m/s

| Rank | Lane | Name | Nationality | Time | Notes |
|---|---|---|---|---|---|
| 1st place, gold medalist(s) | 5 | Louis François Mendy | Senegal | 13.61 | |
| 2nd place, silver medalist(s) | 4 | Amine Bouanani | Algeria | 13.69 | |
| 3rd place, bronze medalist(s) | 7 | Yousuf Badawy Sayyed | Egypt | 13.83 | |
| 4 | 3 | Jérémie Lararaudeuse | Mauritius | 13.85 | |
| 5 | 6 | Saguirou Badamassi | Niger | 13.89 | |
| 6 | 2 | Kemorena Tisang | Botswana | 14.12 | |
| 7 | 8 | Wisdom Musa | Nigeria | 14.13 | |
| 8 | 9 | Salam Ouédraogo | Burkina Faso | 14.74 | |
