= David King (hurdler) =

British hurdler (born 1994)

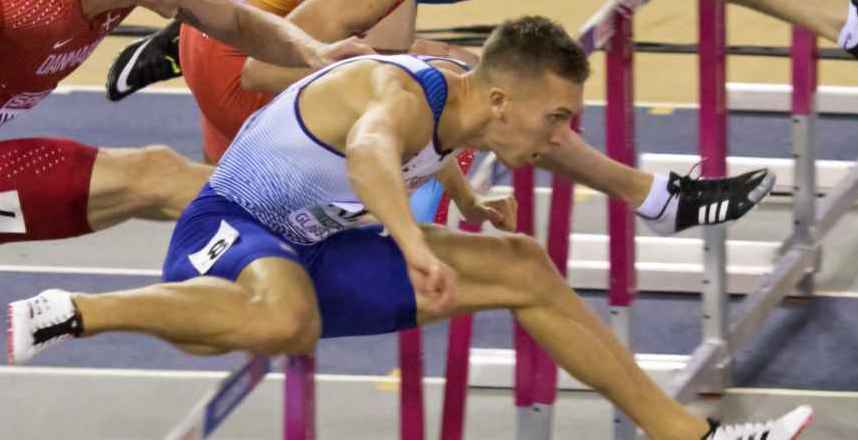
- David King in 2019

Personal information
- Born: 13 June 1994 (age 32) Plymouth, England
- Height: 1.87 m (6 ft 2 in)
- Weight: 81 kg (179 lb)

Sport
- Sport: Athletics
- Events: 110 m hurdles, 60 m hurdles
- Club: City of Plymouth AC
- Coached by: Tim O'Neil (2019-2024); James Hillier (2012–2019); Stephen Endacott (–2012)

Achievements and titles
- World finals: World Athletics Indoor Championships 2022 - 6th
- Personal bests: 110 m hurdles: 13.37 (Turku, 2021); Indoors; 60 m hurdles: 7.57 (Madrid, 2022)

David Matthew King (born 13 June 1994) is an English former athlete who specialised in the high hurdles. He was a three times British champion over 110m hurdles and three times British champion over 60m hurdles. King represented Great Britain and England at a number of major international competitions including the delayed 2020 Tokyo Olympics.

== Biography ==
King was a three times British 110 metres hurdles champion (2017, 2019, 2020) and three times British champion over the 60 metres hurdles (2019, 2020, 2023).

In 2021, he reached the semi-finals at the delayed 2020 Tokyo Olympics.

At the 2022 World Athletics Indoor Championships, King advanced to the final after successfully winning a draw of lots and finished 6th in the final. In the semi-finals, King and Japanese athlete, Shusei Nomoto, tied for the final non-automatic qualifying position with a time of 7.565. As there were no additional lanes available, a drawing of lots took place which saw King advance to the final as a result of his race bib labelled "King" being randomly drawn from a bag.

Having not raced for almost a year, he announced his retirement from professional athletics in June 2025.

== International competitions ==
Year	Competition	Venue	Position	Event	Notes
Representing Great Britain and England
2013	European Junior Championships	Rieti, Italy	8th (h)	110 m hurdles (99 cm)	13.74^{1}
2015	European U23 Championships	Tallinn, Estonia	4th	110 m hurdles	13.90
2016	European Championships	Amsterdam, Netherlands	15th (sf)	110 m hurdles	13.54
2017	European Indoor Championships	Belgrade, Serbia	11th (h)	60 m hurdles	7.70
2017	World Championships	London, United Kingdom	33rd (h)	110 m hurdles	13.67
2018	World Indoor Championships	Birmingham, United Kingdom	18th (sf)	60 m hurdles	7.70
2018	Commonwealth Games	Gold Coast, Australia	10th (h)	110 m hurdles	13.74
2018	European Championships	Berlin, Germany	13th (sf)	110 m hurdles	13.55
2019	European Indoor Championships	Glasgow, United Kingdom	10th (sf)	60 m hurdles	7.71
2021	Olympic Games	Tokyo, Japan	19th (sf)	110 m hurdles	13.67
2022	World Indoor Championships	Belgrade, Serbia	6th	60 m hurdles	7.62
2022	World Championships	Eugene, United States	20th (sf)	110 m hurdles	13.51
2022	European Championships	Munich, Germany	17th (sf)	110 m hurdles	13.73
2023	European Indoor Championships	Istanbul, Turkey	7th	60 m hurdles	7.71
2024	World Indoor Championships	Glasgow, United Kingdom	14th (sf)	60 m hurdles	7.65

^{1}Did not start in the semifinals
