= Jérémie Lararaudeuse =

Mauritian hurdler (born 2001)

Personal information
- Nationality: Mauritius
- Born: 31 March 2001 (age 25)

Sport
- Sport: Athletics
Medal record
Men's athletics
Representing Mauritius
African Championships
Silver medal – second place	2022 Port Louis	110 m hurdles

Jérémie Lararaudeuse (born 31 March 2001) is a Mauritian hurdler. He competed in the 2020 Summer Olympics.

== International competitions ==
Year	Competition	Venue	Position	Event	Notes
Representing Mauritius
2018	African Youth Games	Algiers, Algeria	2nd	110 m hurdles (91.4 cm)	13.81
2019	African U20 Championships	Abidjan, Ivory Coast	2nd	110 m hurdles (99 cm)	14.06
2019	African Games	Rabat, Morocco	5th	110 m hurdles	14.22
2019	African Games	Rabat, Morocco	9th (h)	4 × 100 m relay	40.44
2021	Olympic Games	Tokyo, Japan	36th (h)	110 m hurdles	14.03
2022	World Indoor Championships	Belgrade, Serbia	40th (h)	60 m hurdles	7.94
2022	African Championships	Port Louis, Mauritius	2nd	110 m hurdles	13.55
2022	African Championships	Port Louis, Mauritius	5th	4 × 100 m relay	40.14
2022	World Championships	Eugene, United States	37th (h)	110 m hurdles	14.19
2022	Commonwealth Games	Birmingham, United Kingdom	11th (h)	110 m hurdles	13.88
2023	Jeux de la Francophonie	Kinshasa, DR Congo	3rd (h)	110 m hurdles	13.75^{1}
2023	World Championships	Budapest, Hungary	–	110 m hurdles	DNF
2024	World Indoor Championships	Glasgow, United Kingdom	24th (h)	60 m hurdles	7.75
2024	African Games	Accra, Ghana	4th	110 m hurdles	13.85
2024	African Championships	Douala, Cameroon	5th	110 m hurdles	13.87
2025	World Indoor Championships	Nanjing, China	14th (sf)	60 m hurdles	7.77
2025	World Championships	Tokyo, Japan	34th (h)	110 m hurdles	13.70
2026	Commonwealth Games	Glasgow, United Kingdom	– (h)	110 m hurdles	DNF

^{1}Did not finish in the final
