= 2023 European Athletics Indoor Championships – Men's 60 metres hurdles =

Men's 60 metres hurdles at the 2023 European Athletics Indoor Championships
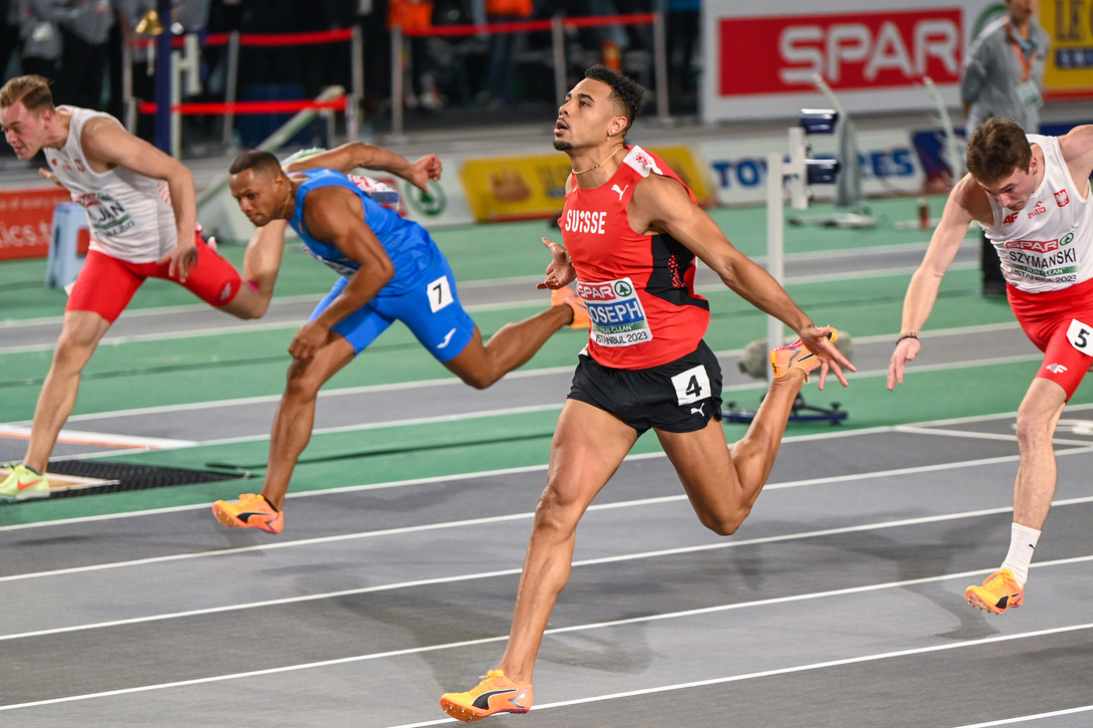
- The finish of the final.
- Venue: Ataköy Athletics Arena
- Location: Istanbul, Turkey
- Dates: 4 March 2023 (round 1); 5 March 2023 (semi-finals and final)
- Competitors: 30 from 17 nations
- Winning time: 7.41 =EL, NR

Medalists
gold medal	Jason Joseph	Switzerland
silver medal	Jakub Szymański	Poland
bronze medal	Just Kwaou-Mathey	France

The men's 60 metres hurdles event at the 2023 European Athletics Indoor Championships was held on 4 March 2023 at 11:20 (heats) and on 5 March 2023 10:35 (semi-finals), at 21:05 (final) local time.

== Records ==
Standing records prior to the 2023 European Athletics Indoor Championships
World record	Grant Holloway (USA)	7.29	Gallur, Spain	24 February 2021
World record	Grant Holloway (USA)	7.29	Belgrade, Serbia	20 March 2022
European record	Colin Jackson (GBR)	7.30	Sindelfingen, Germany	6 March 1994
Championship record	Colin Jackson (GBR)	7.39	Paris, France	12 March 1994
World Leading	Grant Holloway (USA)	7.35	Birmingham, United Kingdom	25 February 2023
European Leading	Jason Joseph (SUI)	7.44	St. Gallen, Switzerland	19 February 2023

== Results ==
=== Heats ===
Qualification: First 3 in each heat (Q) and the next fastest 4 (q) advance to the Semifinals.

Rank	Heat	Athlete	Nationality	Time	Note
1	1	Jason Joseph	Switzerland	7.61	Q
2	3	Enrique Llopis	Spain	7.63	Q
3	2	Just Kwaou-Mathey	France	7.63	Q
4	2	Jakub Szymański	Poland	7.65	Q
5	3	Krzysztof Kiljan	Poland	7.67	Q
6	4	Paolo Dal Molin	Italy	7.71	Q
7	1	Milan Trajković	Cyprus	7.71	Q
8	3	Lorenzo Simonelli	Italy	7.72	Q
9	3	Dimitri Bascou	France	7.73	q
10	1	David King	Great Britain	7.75	Q
11	4	Elmo Lakka	Finland	7.75	Q
12	1	Bálint Szeles	Hungary	7.76	q
13	4	Vladimir Vukicevic	Norway	7.76	Q
14	1	Abdel Kader Larrinaga	Portugal	7.77	q
15	1	Kevin Sánchez	Spain	7.77	q
16	4	Pascal Martinot-Lagarde	France	7.79	
17	3	Finley Gaio	Switzerland	7.79	
18	2	Hassane Fofana	Italy	7.79	Q
19	2	Tim Eikermann	Germany	7.80	
20	4	Konstantinos Douvalidis	Greece	7.82	SB
21	4	Mikdat Sevler	Turkey	7.83	
22	3	Max Hrelja	Sweden	7.84	
23	2	Ilari Manninen	Finland	7.87	
24	1	Alin Ionuț Anton	Romania	7.89	
25	2	Luka Trgovčević	Serbia	7.91	
26	3	Santeri Kuusiniemi	Finland	7.95	
27	4	Damian Czykier	Poland	7.95	
28	2	Dániel Eszes	Hungary	8.03	
29	4	Mathieu Jaquet	Switzerland	8.10	
30	2	Daniel Cisneros	Spain	8.24	

=== Semifinals ===
Qualification: First 4 in each heat (Q) advance to the Final.

Rank	Heat	Athlete	Nationality	Time	Note
1	1	Jason Joseph	Switzerland	7.50	Q
2	1	Jakub Szymański	Poland	7.54	Q
3	2	Enrique Llopis	Spain	7.58	Q
4	2	Just Kwaou-Mathey	France	7.61	Q
5	1	Paolo Dal Molin	Italy	7.62	Q
6	2	Krzysztof Kiljan	Poland	7.67	Q
7	2	David King	Great Britain	7.68	Q
8	2	Hassane Fofana	Italy	7.71	SB
9	2	Milan Trajković	Cyprus	7.73	
10	1	Lorenzo Simonelli	Italy	7.74	Q
11	1	Kevin Sánchez	Spain	7.75	
12	1	Vladimir Vukicevic	Norway	7.75	
13	2	Abdel Kader Larrinaga	Portugal	7.81	
14	1	Elmo Lakka	Finland	7.83	
15	2	Bálint Szeles	Hungary	8.15	
	1	Dimitri Bascou	France	DNF	

=== Final ===
Rank	Heat	Athlete	Nationality	Time	Note
1st place, gold medalist(s)	4	Jason Joseph	Switzerland	7.41	EL, NR
2nd place, silver medalist(s)	5	Jakub Szymański	Poland	7.56	
3rd place, bronze medalist(s)	3	Just Kwaou-Mathey	France	7.59	
4	1	Lorenzo Simonelli	Italy	7.59	PB
5	7	Paolo Dal Molin	Italy	7.62	
6	8	Krzysztof Kiljan	Poland	7.63	
7	2	David King	Great Britain	7.71	
	6	Enrique Llopis	Spain	DNF	
