= Joshua Zeller =

British hurdler (born 2000)

Josh Zeller
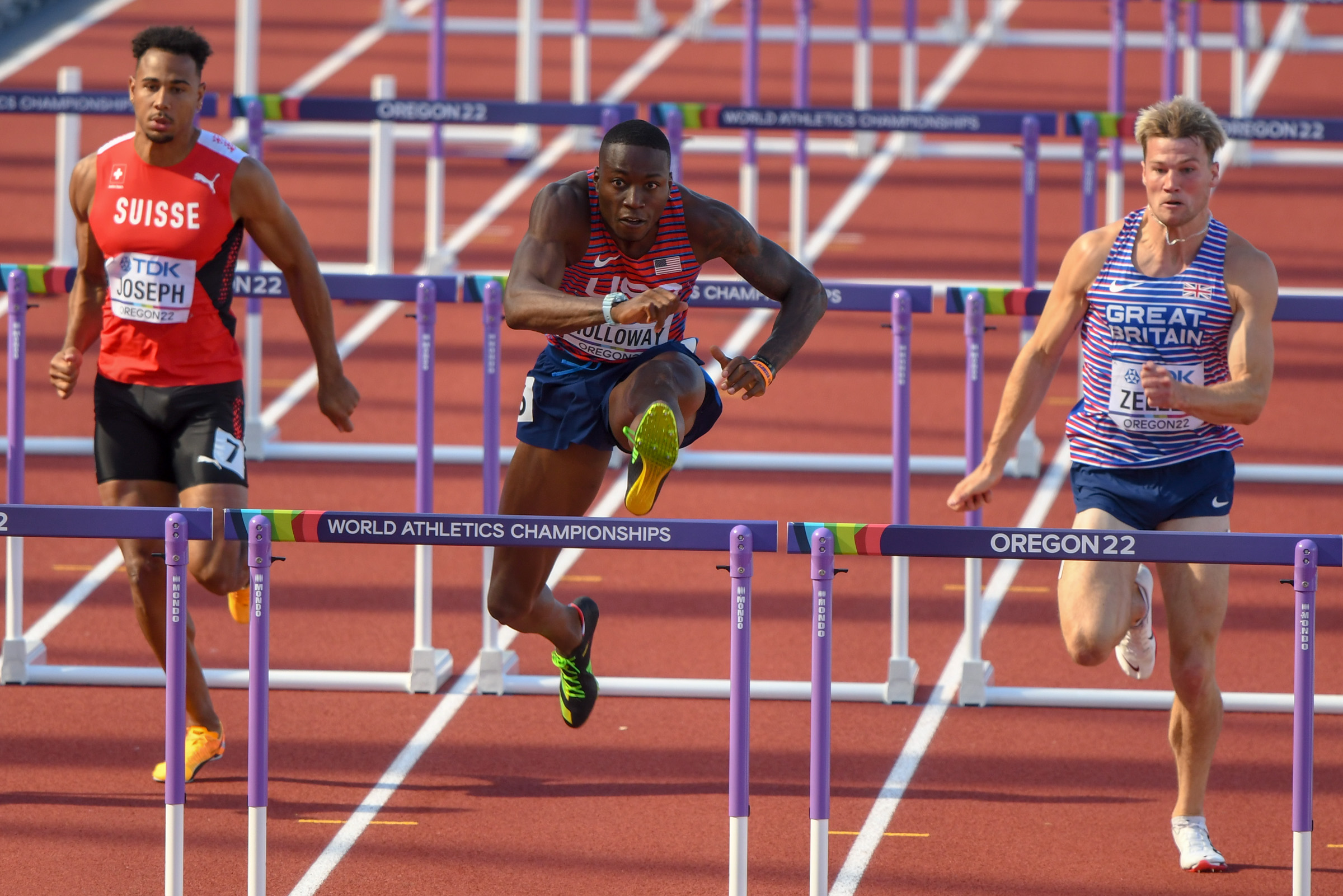
- Zeller at the 2022 World Championships

Personal information
- Nationality: British
- Born: 19 October 2000 (age 25) Johannesburg, South Africa
- Height: 1.88 m (6 ft 2 in)

Sport
- Sport: Track and Field
- Event: 110 metres hurdles
- Club: Bracknell AC
Medal record
Men's athletics
Representing Great Britain
European U20 Championships
Gold medal – first place	2019 Borås	110 m hurdles

Joshua Zeller (born 19 October 2000) is an athlete from Great Britain who competes as a hurdler. He placed fifth in the 110 metres hurdles at the 2022 World Athletics Championships and fourth at the 2022 Commonwealth Games. He was the 2019 European under-20 champion.

== Biography ==
From Woosehill, Berkshire, Zeller attended The Forest School, Winnersh and trained at Bracknell Athletics Club, prior to being awarded a scholarship to study and compete for the Michigan Wolverines track and field team in the United States.

Zeller was a semi-finalist in the 110 metres hurdles at the 2018 IAAF World U20 Championships in Tampere, Finland. The following year, Zeller moved to second on the under-20 British all-time rankings with a time of 13.26 seconds in Mannheim, Germany, the time 0.09s behind the David Omoregie record set in 2014. Later that summer, Zeller won the gold medal in the 110 m hurdles at the 2019 European Athletics U20 Championships in Borås, Sweden.

Zeller finished runner-up in the 110 metres hurdles at the 2022 British Athletics Championships. Zeller placed fifth in the 110 metres hurdles final at the 2022 World Athletics Championships in Eugene, Oregon on his major championship debut. That summer, he placed fourth over 110 metres hurdles at the 2022 Commonwealth Games in Birmingham.

In June 2023, Zeller placed fifth in the 110 metres hurdles at the 2023 European Athletics Team Championships First Division in Poland. Having ran a wind-assisted 13.34 in finishing second at the 2023 British Athletics Championships, he was one of a number of athlete controversially not selected by British Athletics for that year's World Championships despite qualifying by ranking.
