= 2017 European Athletics Indoor Championships – Men's 60 metres hurdles =

The men's 60 metres hurdles event at the 2017 European Athletics Indoor Championships was held on 3 March 2017 at 16:45 (heats), and at 20:10 (final) local time.

== Medalists ==
Gold	Silver	Bronze
Andrew Pozzi; Great Britain	Pascal Martinot-Lagarde; France	Petr Svoboda; Czech Republic

== Records ==
Standing records prior to the 2017 European Athletics Indoor Championships
World record	Colin Jackson (GBR)	7.30	Sindelfingen, Germany	6 March 1994
European record	Colin Jackson (GBR)	7.30	Sindelfingen, Germany	6 March 1994
Championship record	Colin Jackson (GBR)	7.39	Paris, France	12 March 1994
World Leading	Andrew Pozzi (GBR)	7.43	Birmingham, United Kingdom	18 February 2017
European Leading	Andrew Pozzi (GBR)	7.43	Birmingham, United Kingdom	18 February 2017

== Results ==
=== Heats ===
Qualification: First 2 in each heat (Q) and the next 2 fastest (q) advance to the Final.

Rank	Heat	Athlete	Nationality	Time	Note
1	1	Andrew Pozzi	Great Britain	7.52	Q
2	2	Milan Trajkovic	Cyprus	7.56	Q, NR
2	1	Aurel Manga	France	7.56	Q
4	2	Orlando Ortega	Spain	7.59	Q
4	1	Petr Svoboda	Czech Republic	7.59	q
6	3	Pascal Martinot-Lagarde	France	7.61	Q
7	2	Garfield Darien	France	7.65	q
8	2	Damian Czykier	Poland	7.65	PB
9	2	Erik Balnuweit	Germany	7.67	
10	3	Andreas Martinsen	Denmark	7.68	Q, NR
11	2	David King	Great Britain	7.70	
12	3	David Omoregie	Great Britain	7.71	
13	1	Maximilian Bayer	Germany	7.73	
14	3	Alexander Brorsson	Sweden	7.78	
14	1	Hassane Fofana	Italy	7.78	
14	2	Elmo Lakka	Finland	7.78	SB
17	1	Ben Reynolds	Ireland	7.81	
18	3	Serhiy Kopanayko	Ukraine	7.95	
19	3	Cosmin Ilie Dumitrache	Romania	8.00	
20	3	Yidiel Contreras	Spain	8.04	
	2	Balázs Baji	Hungary	DQ	R162.7
	1	Vitali Parakhonka	Belarus	DQ	R162.7
	1	Artem Shamatryn	Ukraine	DQ	R162.7
	3	Valdó Szűcs	Hungary	DNS	

=== Final ===
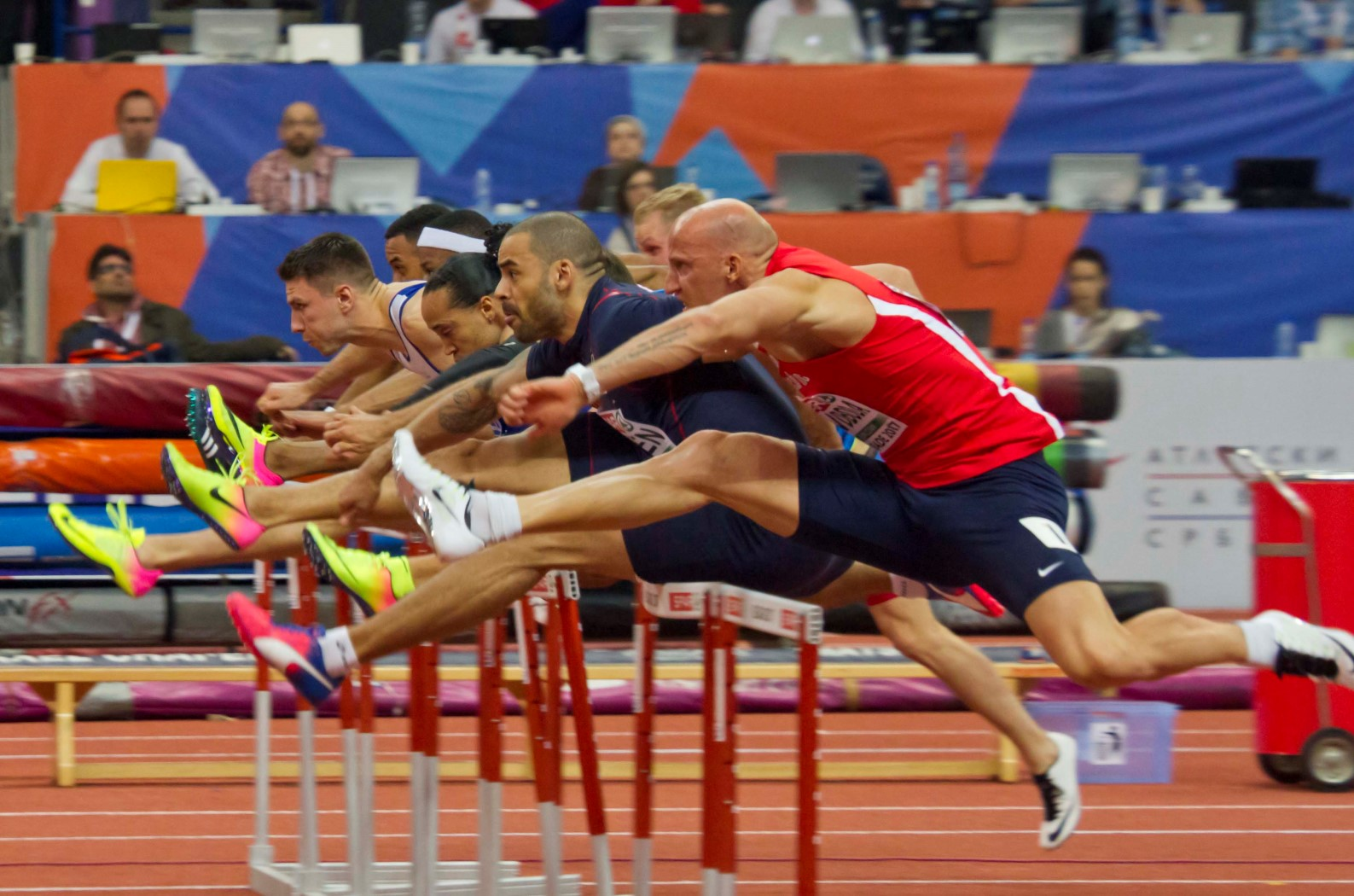
The final

Rank	Lane	Athlete	Nationality	Time	Note
1st place, gold medalist(s)	5	Andy Pozzi	United Kingdom	7.51	
2nd place, silver medalist(s)	4	Pascal Martinot-Lagarde	France	7.52	
3rd place, bronze medalist(s)	1	Petr Svoboda	Czech Republic	7.53	SB
4	2	Garfield Darien	France	7.54	
5	6	Aurel Manga	France	7.58	
6	3	Milan Trajkovic	Cyprus	7.60	
7	7	Orlando Ortega	Spain	7.64	
8	8	Andreas Martinsen	Denmark	7.68	=NR
