= Shusei Nomoto =

Japanese athlete (born 1995)

Personal information
- Nationality: Japanese
- Born: 25 October 1995 (age 30)

Sport
- Sport: Athletics
- Event: Hurdles

Achievements and titles
- Personal bests: 60m hurdles: 7.49 (Toryń, 2026) NR; 100m hurdles 13.20 (Fukui, 2023)
Medal record
Men's athletics
Representing Japan
Asian Indoor Championships
Silver medal – second place	2026 Tanjijn	60 m hurdles

Shusei Nomoto (date 25 October 1995) is a Japanese hurdler. He was Japanese national champion in 2022 over 60m hurdles and won the silver medal in the 60 metres hurdles at the 2026 Asian Indoor Athletics Championships. He ran the Japanese national record of 7.49 seconds in the final of the 60 m hurdles at the 2026 World Athletics Indoor Championships.

== Biography ==
Nomoto won the Japanese indoor championships in Osaka in March 2022, over 60m hurdles, running a time of 7.58 seconds. Competing at the 2022 World Athletics Indoor Championships in Belgrade later that month, he reached the semifinals and missed out on a chance to run in the final after a drawing-of-lots, having run a dead-heat time of 7.57 seconds with British athlete David King.

In July 2025, he was runner-up over 110 metres hurdles at the Japanese Athletics Championships in a time of 13.23 seconds. He was one of seven athletes named that month to represent the Japanese national team at the 2025 World Athletics Championships, held in Tokyo. He was a semi-finalist competing in the men's 110 metres hurdles at the Championships, placing fourth in his heat in 13.30 seconds to advance to the semi-finals, before running 13.29 seconds to place third in his semi-final without qualifying for the final.

In February 2026, he won the silver medal in the 60 metres hurdles at the 2026 Asian Indoor Athletics Championships in Tianjin, China. In March 2026, he was a finalist over 60 metres hurdles at the 2026 World Athletics Indoor Championships in Toruń, Poland, running 7.49 seconds to place sixth overall in a Japanese national record time.
