= 2018 African Championships in Athletics – Men's 110 metres hurdles =

The men's 110 metres hurdles event at the 2018 African Championships in Athletics was held on 3 and 4 August in Asaba, Nigeria.

== Medalists ==
Gold	Silver	Bronze
Antonio Alkana; South Africa	Oyeniyi Abejoye; Nigeria	Welington Zaza; Liberia

== Results ==
=== Heats ===
Qualification: First 3 of each heat (Q) and the next 2 fastest (q) qualified for the final.

Wind:
Heat 1: ? m/s, Heat 2: ? m/s

Rank	Heat	Name	Nationality	Time	Notes
1	2	Oyeniyi Abejoye	Nigeria	13.97	Q
2	2	Louis-François Mendy	Senegal	13.99	Q
3	1	Antonio Alkana	South Africa	14.03	Q
4	1	Ogieriakhi Martins	Nigeria	14.15	Q
5	1	Welington Zaza	Liberia	14.18	Q
6	2	Ruan de Vries	South Africa	14.23	Q
7	1	Abdullahi Bashiru	Nigeria	14.41	q
8	2	Ramy Elmahdy	Egypt	14.44	q
9	1	Mohammed Koussi	Morocco	14.59	
10	2	Ibrahim Jemal	Ethiopia	15.35	

=== Final ===
Wind: -0.9 m/s

Rank	Lane	Athlete	Nationality	Time	Notes
1st place, gold medalist(s)	6	Antonio Alkana	South Africa	13.51	
2nd place, silver medalist(s)	3	Oyeniyi Abejoye	Nigeria	13.87	
3rd place, bronze medalist(s)	7	Welington Zaza	Liberia	13.88	
4	5	Ogieriakhi Martins	Nigeria	13.93	
5	4	Louis-François Mendy	Senegal	13.94	
6	8	Ruan de Vries	South Africa	13.98	
7	1	Abdullahi Bashiru	Nigeria	14.18	
8	2	Ramy Elmahdy	Egypt	14.46	
