= Trey Cunningham =

American hurdler

Personal information
- Born: August 26, 1998 (age 28)
- Home town: Winfield, Alabama, United States

Sport
- Country: United States
- Sport: Track and field
- Event: 110 m hurdles
- College team: Florida State Seminoles

Achievements and titles
- Personal bests: Outdoor; 100 m: 10.17 (Miramar 2025); 200 m: 21.27 (Tuscaloosa 2019); 110 mH: 12.98 (Rome 2026); Indoor; 60 m: 6.67 (Fayetteville 2022); 200 m: 21.43 (Clemson 2018); 60 mH: 7.35 (Toruń 2026)
Medal record
Men's athletics
Representing the United States
World Championships
Silver medal – second place	2022 Eugene	110 m hurdles
World Indoor Championships
Bronze medal – third place	2026 Toruń	60 m hurdles

Olan Bradford "Trey" Cunningham III (born August 26, 1998) is an American hurdler who specializes in the 110 metres hurdles. He was a silver medalist in the 110 metres hurdles event at the 2022 World Athletics Championships after finishing second at the 2022 USA Outdoor Track and Field Championships.

== Background ==
Cunningham won the 110 metres hurdles at the 2022 NCAA Division I Outdoor Track and Field Championships, having run the second fastest time in NCAA history in 13.00 seconds.

He is represented by Ford Models.

== Statistics ==
- Information from World Athletics profile unless otherwise noted.

=== Personal bests ===
Sprints, hurdles and Long Jump
Event	Time	Venue	Date	Notes
60 m	6.67	Fayetteville, Arkansas, U.S.	February 11, 2022	Indoor
60 m hurdles	7.35	Toruń, Poland	March 21, 2026	Indoor
110 m hurdles	12.98	Rome, Italy	June 4, 2026	
100 m	10.17	Miramar, U.S.	May 4, 2025	
400 m	49.58	Birmingham, Alabama, U.S.	December 3, 2016	
4 × 400 m relay	3:13.46	Coral Gables, Florida, U.S.	June 7, 2019	
Indoor 4 × 400 m relay	3:12.56	Clemson, South Carolina, U.S.	January 11, 2020	
Event	Mark	Venue	Date	Notes
Long jump	7.04 m (23 ft 1 in)	Birmingham, Alabama, U.S.	December 12, 2015	

=== International championship results ===
Representing the United States
Year	Championship	Position	Event	Time	Venue	Notes
2022	World Championships	2nd	110 m hurdles	13.08	+1.2	Eugene, Oregon
2024	World Indoor Championships	6th	60 m hurdles	7.53	—N/a	Glasgow, United Kingdom
2026	World Indoor Championships	3rd	60 m hurdles	7.43	—N/a	Toruń, Poland
2026	World Ultimate Championship	4th	110 m hurdles	13.08	-0.6	Budapest, Hungary

=== National championship results ===
- PB = personal best
- SB = seasonal best
- WL = world lead, fastest time in the world in a calendar year
- NR = national (American) record

Representing the Winfield City High School Pirates (2015–2017), Florida State Seminoles (2018–2022), and Adidas (2022–present)
Year	Championship	Position	Event	Time or mark	Wind (m/s)	Venue	Notes
2015	AAU U19 Junior Olympics	3rd	110 m hurdles	14.27	−0.6	Norfolk, Virginia	
2015	New Balance Nationals Outdoor	4th	110 m hurdles	14.39	−1.3	Greensboro, North Carolina	
2016	New Balance Indoor Nationals	4th	60 m hurdles	7.71		New York City, NY	
2016	New Balance Nationals Outdoor	2nd	110 m hurdles	13.43	−0.3	Greensboro, North Carolina	
2016	AAU U19 National Club Championships	1st	110 m hurdles	13.77	−1.2	Kissimmee, Florida	
2017	New Balance Indoor Nationals	1st	60 m hurdles	7.40		New York City, NY	
2018	USA Outdoor Track and Field Championships	5th	110 m hurdles	13.71	−1.8	Des Moines, Iowa	
2019	USA Outdoor Track and Field Championships	8th	110 m hurdles	13.72	−0.8	Des Moines, Iowa	
2021	United States Olympic trials	4th	110 m hurdles	13.21	0.4	Eugene, Oregon	
2022	USA Outdoor Track and Field Championships	2nd	110 m hurdles	13.08	1.2	Eugene, Oregon	

=== Circuit performances ===
Grand Slam Track results
Slam	Race group	Event	Pl.	Time	Prize money
2025 Miami Slam	Short hurdles	110 m hurdles	1st	13.00	US$100,000
2025 Miami Slam	Short hurdles	100 m	1st	10.17	US$100,000
2025 Philadelphia Slam	Short hurdles	110 m hurdles	3rd	13.18	US$50,000
2025 Philadelphia Slam	Short hurdles	100 m	1st	10.36	US$50,000

==== Wins and titles ====
- World Indoor Tour Gold (60 m hurdles)
  - Overall winner:
- Diamond League (110 m hurdles)
  - Overall winner:
- European Athletic Association (110 m hurdles)
  - Meeting Città di Padova: 2022

== Personal life ==
Cunningham was raised in rural Winfield, Alabama.

He graduated Winfield City High School in 2017, and later graduated from Florida State University in 2021. He earned a master's in sports management from Florida State University. In his thesis, Cunningham examined the connection between athletes' personalities and burn out.

While he came out as gay publicly in 2024, he first came out to family and friends earlier, when he was 20.
