= Louis François Mendy =

Senegalese hurdler (born 1999)

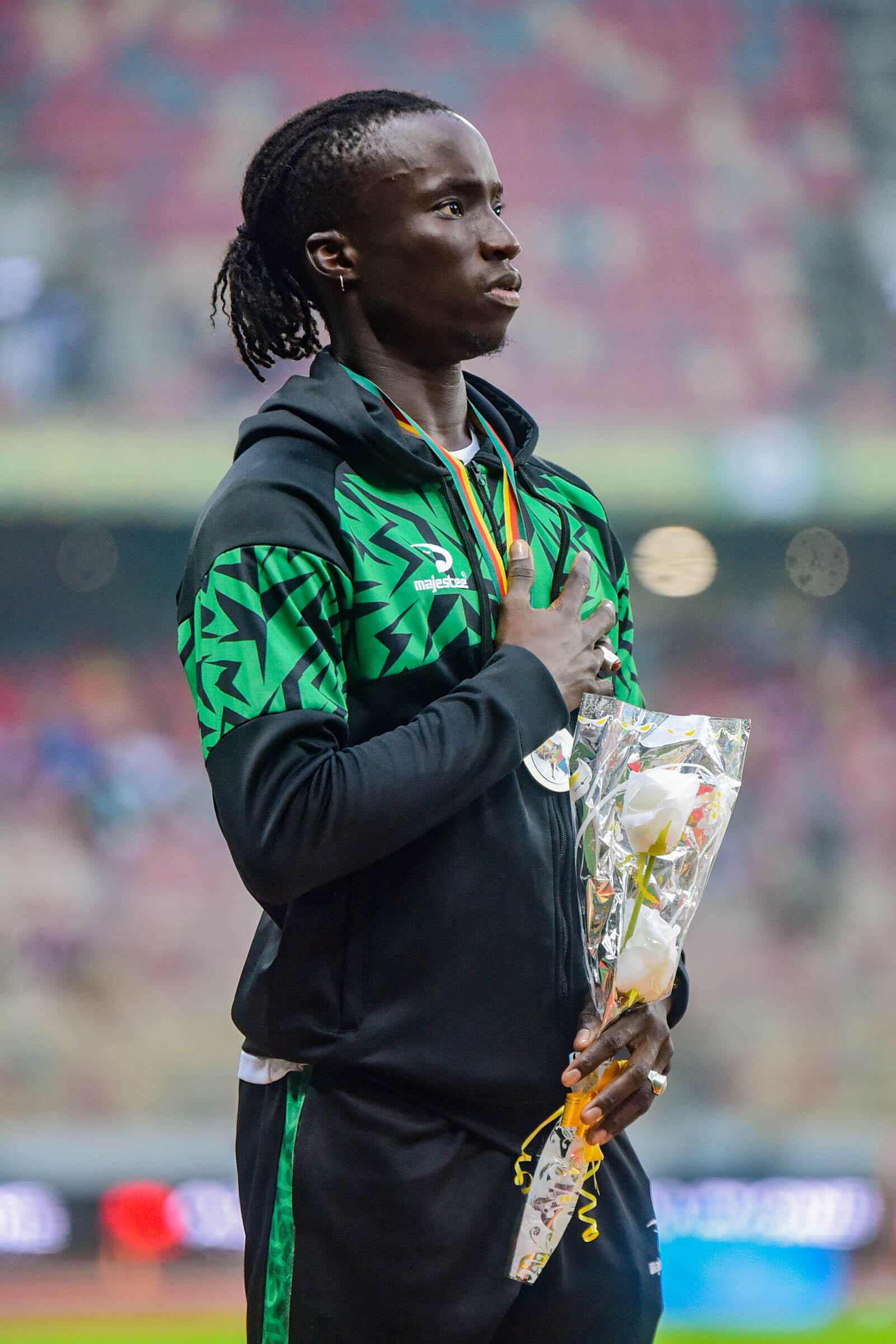
- Louis François Mendy in 2024

Personal information
- Nationality: Senegalese
- Born: 2 March 1999 (age 27) Guédiawaye, Senegal

Sport
- Sport: Track and field
- Event: 110 metres hurdles

Achievements and titles
- Personal best: 110 m hs– 13.59 (2019)
Medal record
Men's athletics
Representing Senegal
African Games
Gold medal – first place	2023 Accra	110 m hurdles
Bronze medal – third place	2019 Rabat	110 m hurdles
African Championships
Gold medal – first place	2024 Douala	110 m hurdles
Silver medal – second place	2026 Accra	110 m hurdles

Louis François Mendy (born 2 March 1999) is a Senegalese track and field athlete who specialises in the 110 metres hurdles and also competes as a sprinter. At the 2019 African Games, he competed in the 110 metres hurdles, winning a bronze medal after winning the semifinal. Four years later he won gold.

Louis François Mendy got an Olympic Scholarship and was then selected for a universality place to participate in 2020 Summer Games in 110 m hurdles.

== International competitions ==
Year	Competition	Venue	Position	Event	Notes
Representing Senegal
2017	African U20 Championships	Tlemcen, Algeria	2nd	110 m hurdles (99 cm)	14.24
2017	African U20 Championships	Tlemcen, Algeria	–	4 × 100 m relay	DNF
2017	African U20 Championships	Tlemcen, Algeria	6th	4 × 400 m relay	3:22.34
2018	African Championships	Asaba, Nigeria	5th	110 m hurdles	13.94
2019	African Games	Rabat, Morocco	3rd	110 m hurdles	14.05
2019	World Championships	Doha, Qatar	30th (h)	110 m hurdles	13.75
2021	Olympic Games	Tokyo, Japan	34th (h)	110 m hurdles	13.84
2022	World Indoor Championships	Belgrade, Serbia	41st (h)	60 m hurdles	7.95
2022	African Championships	Port Louis, Mauritius	39th (h)	200 m	21.57
2022	African Championships	Port Louis, Mauritius	–	110 m hurdles	DNF
2022	World Championships	Eugene, United States	29th (h)	110 m hurdles	13.70
2022	Islamic Solidarity Games	Konya, Turkey	2nd	110 m hurdles	13.28
2023	Jeux de la Francophonie	Kinshasa, DR Congo	1st	110 m hurdles	13.38
2023	Jeux de la Francophonie	Kinshasa, DR Congo	2nd	4 × 100 m relay	39.66
2023	World Championships	Budapest, Hungary	2nd (h)	110 m hurdles	13.24^{1}
2024	African Games	Accra, Ghana	1st	110 m hurdles	13.61
2024	African Championships	Douala, Cameroon	1st	110 m hurdles	13.49
2024	Olympic Games	Paris, France	11th (sf)	110 m hurdles	13.34
2025	World Championships	Tokyo, Japan	21st (h)	110 m hurdles	13.33^{2}
2026	World Indoor Championships	Toruń, Poland	21st (sf)	60 m hurdles	7.74
2026	African Championships	Accra, Ghana	5th	110 m hurdles	13.81

^{1}Disqualified in the semifinals
^{2}Did not finish in the semifinals

Olympic Games
Preceded by Jeanne Boutbien; Mbagnick Ndiaye	Flag bearer for Senegal; Paris 2024 with Combe Seck	Succeeded by Incumbent
