= Zhu Shenglong =

Chinese hurdler (born 2000)

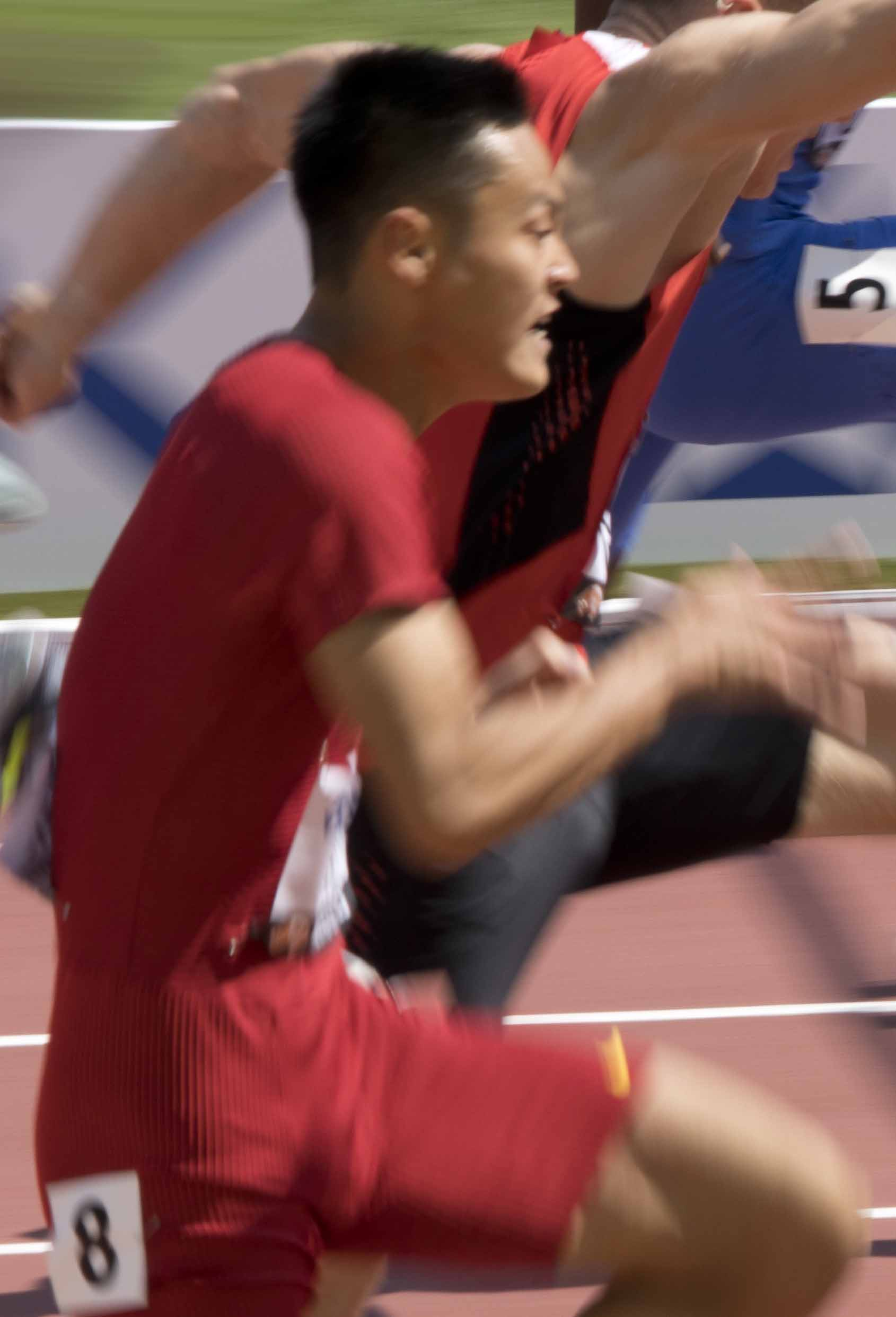
- Shenglong at the 2023 World Athletics Championships

Personal information
- Native name: Chinese: 朱胜龙
- Nationality: China
- Born: 25 January 2000 (26 years, 189 days old)
- Home town: Hubei, China

Sport
- Sport: Sport of athletics
- Events: 60 metres hurdles 110 metres hurdles
- Coached by: Xie Jiming

Achievements and titles
- National finals: 2017 Chinese U18s; • 110m hurdles, 2nd (silver); 2018 Chinese U20s; • 110m hurdles, 3rd (bronze); 2018 Chinese Champs; • 110m hurdles, 4th; 2019 Chinese U20s; • 110m hurdles, 3rd (bronze); 2019 Chinese Champs; • 110m hurdles, 4th; 2021 National Games; • 110m hurdles, 4th; 2023 Chinese Champs; • 110m hurdles, 1st (gold)
- Personal bests: 60mH: 7.63 (2024) 110mH: 13.25 (−0.1) (2023)
- Updated on 6 April 2024

Zhu Shenglong (Note: In this Chinese name, the family name is Zhu.) (Chinese: 朱胜龙; born 25 January 2000) is a Chinese hurdler specializing in the 110 metres hurdles. He was the 2023 Chinese Athletics Championships winner, and he has represented China at the 2023 World Athletics Championships and several other international competitions.

== Career ==
Zhu began his career with success at the U18 level. After placing runner-up at the 2017 Chinese U18 Championships, he first represented China at the 2017 World U18 Championships in Athletics, finishing 6th in his 110 m hurdles heat and failing to advance to the semifinals. At the 2017 Asian Indoor Games later that year, Zhu finished 6th in his 60 metres hurdles semifinal and again did not advance.

Zhu achieved modest national results over the next few years, and in 2020 he joined a team of Chinese nationals to compete in several American collegiate indoor track meets, finishing runner-up at the 2020 Don Kirby Elite Invitational.

He would not represent China internationally again until 2023, qualifying for the World Championships 110 m hurdles by virtue of his Chinese Athletics Championships title that year. At the championships, he finished 32nd overall. He ended his 2023 season at the Asian Games, advancing to the final and finishing 6th.

At the 2024 World Indoor Championships, Zhu advanced past the first round but was disqualified in his semifinal for a false start.

== Personal life ==
Zhu is from Hubei, China. He is coached by Xie Jiming, who once said of Zhu in Chinese, "Zhu Shenglong is a lightweight athlete, and currently his waist The abdominal strength is weak and not thick, so if we want to make a breakthrough in the Olympics next year, we must focus on strengthening this winter training."

Zhu and the other Chinese hurdlers have maintained a rivalry with the Japanese athletics team, and Zhu has been contrasted with Shunsuke Izumiya.

== Statistics ==
=== Personal best progression ===
110m Hurdles progression
#	Mark	Pl.	Competition	Venue	Date	Ref.
1	14.21 (+1.1 m/s)	3rd place, bronze medalist(s)	National Grand Prix	Dalian, China	3 Aug 2018	
2	14.13 (+0.7 m/s)	4th (Heat 2)	Chinese Athletics Championships	Taiyuan, China	14 Sep 2018	
3	14.09 (−0.3 m/s)	4th	Chinese Athletics Championships	Taiyuan, China	15 Sep 2018	
4	14.01 (±0.0 m/s)	3rd place, bronze medalist(s)	National Grand Prix	Luoyang, China	29 May 2019	
5	13.90 (+0.1 m/s)	4th	Chinese Athletics Championships	Shenyang, China	7 Jul 2019	
6	13.87 (+1.3 m/s)	1st place, gold medalist(s)	Happy Chengdu Meet	Chengdu, China	14 May 2021	
7	13.78 (+1.9 m/s)	2nd place, silver medalist(s)	Division Invitational Tournament - Central China	Wuhan, China	18 May 2021	
8	13.63 (±0.0 m/s)	4th	Athletics at the National Games of China	Xi'an, China	21 Sep 2021	
9	13.55 (+1.2 m/s)	(gold) (Heat 2)	National Grand Prix	Zhaoqing, China	21 Apr 2023	
10	13.47 (−0.5 m/s)	(gold) (Heat 1)	World Championships & Asian Games Trials	Shenyang, China	28 Jun 2023	
11	13.25 (−0.1 m/s)	1st place, gold medalist(s)	World Championships & Asian Games Trials	Shenyang, China	28 Jun 2023	
