= Wellington Zaza =

Liberian hurdler

Personal information
- Nationality: Liberian
- Born: 20 January 1995 (age 31) Liberia
- Education: Auburn University

Sport
- Sport: Track and field
- Event(s): 110 meters hurdles 400 meters hurdles

Achievements and titles
- Personal best(s): 110 meters hurdles (99cm): 13.38 seconds 110 meters hurdles (full height): 13.36 seconds 400 meters hurdles: 52.55 seconds
Medal record
Men's athletics
Representing Liberia
African Championships
Bronze medal – third place	2018 Asaba	110 m hurdles

Wellington Zaza (born 20 January 1995) is a Liberian hurdler who specializes in the 110 meters hurdles and the 400 meters hurdles. Zaza is the African junior record holder in the 110 metres hurdles. (Note: The hurdle height for the 110 metres hurdles for junior athletes is 99 cm compared to a hurdle height of 107 cm for senior athletes.) He broke that record at the 2014 World Junior Championships in Athletics. He has also competed at a World Championships.

== Early life ==
Zaza was born on 20 January 1995, a member of the Krahn ethnic group. Zaza's father had ties with the Samuel Doe government, and as such, after Doe was deposed, Zaza's father was made a political prisoner. In 1999, Zaza's mother was able to flee the Second Liberian Civil War and go to the United States. The same year, Zaza as refugee arrived in the Ivory Coast. Two years later, Zaza's mother returned, and was able to bring him and his siblings to the United States, where he came to live in West Philadelphia.

In 2014, Zaza started to attend Auburn University, from which he graduated in 2017.

== Competition ==
Zaza's debut at an international athletics competition was at the 2014 World Junior Championships in Athletics. Zaza competed in both the 110 meters hurdles and the 400 meters hurdles. For the heat round of the 110 meters hurdles, Zaza was drawn in heat two, a heat containing seven other athletes alongside Zaza. In his heat, Zaza ran a time of 13.66 seconds, a season's best for him, to finish third in his heat. He finished 0.07 seconds behind the heat winner, American Theophile Viltz, and 0.02 seconds behind the heat runner-up, Patrick Elger of Germany. Overall, Zaza was the equal ninth quickest athlete (equal with Hungarian Valdó Szücs) in the heat round. As the top three athletes from each heat qualified for the semi-finals, Zaza progressed. In the semi-final, Zaza ran a Liberian junior record time of 13.53 seconds to finish second in the race. Zaza was 0.08 seconds behind the race winner, Jamaican Tyler Mason. Overall, Zaza's time was the fifth quickest in the semi-final round. As the top two finishers from each semi-final qualified for the final, Zaza progressed. In the final, Zaza ran a time of 13.38 seconds. The time was a new African junior record in the 110 meters hurdles. Zaza finished fourth, 0.39 seconds behind the winner, Wilhem Belocian of France. In the 400 metres hurdles, Zaza did not progress past the heats after his time of 55.38 seconds was not quick enough to progress.

At the 2015 World Championships, Zaza was the only competitor from Liberia. He competed in the 110 meters hurdles. He finished last in his heat (of athletes that finished) in a time of 14.56 seconds. Zaza was the second slowest athlete overall in the heat round. Zaza did not progress to the semi-finals.
