= Badamassi Saguirou =

Nigerien track and field athlete (born 2001)

Personal information
- Nationality: Nigerien
- Born: 28 November 2000 (age 25)

Sport
- Event: 100m
Medal record
Men's athletics
Representing Niger
African Championships
Gold medal – first place	2026 Accra	110 m hurdles

Badamassi Saguirou (born 28 November 2000) is a Nigerien track and field athlete and a national record holder in men's 110m hurdles.

== Career ==
Saguirou made his Olympic debut representing Niger at the 2020 Summer Olympics and competed in the men's 100m event. He received a universality place to compete at the 2020 Summer Olympics. He ran a personal best time of 10.87 seconds.
