= 2023 Meeting Hauts-de-France Pas-de-Calais =

Indoor athletics meeting in Liévin, France

- Dates: 15 February 2023
- Host city: Liévin, France
- Venue: Arena Stade Couvert
- Level: 2023 World Athletics Indoor Tour

The 2023 Meeting Hauts-de-France Pas-de-Calais was the 29th edition of the annual indoor athletics meeting in Liévin, France. Held on 15 February, it was the fifth leg of the 2023 World Athletics Indoor Tour Gold series – the highest-level international indoor track and field athletics circuit.

At the meeting, Lamecha Girma broke the world record for 3000 metres with a time of 7:23.81. The prior record by Daniel Komen stood since 1998. Femke Bol and Karsten Warholm broke the women's and men's 400 metres meeting records respectively.

== Results ==
=== World Athletics Indoor Tour ===
Men's 1500m
Place	Athlete	Country	Time	Points
1st place, gold medalist(s)	Jakob Ingebrigtsen	Norway	3:32.38	10
2nd place, silver medalist(s)	Azeddine Habz	France	3:35.27	7
3rd place, bronze medalist(s)	Adel Mechaal	Spain	3:36.55	5
4	Michał Rozmys	Poland	3:36.96	3
5	Teddese Lemi	Ethiopia	3:37.42	
6	Charles Grethen	Luxembourg	3:37.45	
7	Federico Riva	Italy	3:37.74	
8	Melkeneh Azize	Ethiopia	3:37.84	
9	Ignacio Fontes	Spain	3:37.91	
10	Simon Denissel	France	3:38.59	
11	Ferdinand Kvan Edman	Norway	3:39.66	
12	Samuel Abate	Ethiopia	3:39.80	
13	Ermias Girma	Ethiopia	3:42.07	
	Erik Sowinski	United States	DNF	
	Julian Ranc	France	DNF	

Men's 60mH
Place	Athlete	Country	Time	Points
1st place, gold medalist(s)	Grant Holloway	United States	7.39	10
2nd place, silver medalist(s)	Daniel Roberts	United States	7.43	7
3rd place, bronze medalist(s)	Pascal Martinot-Lagarde	France	7.62	5
4	Jakub Szymański	Poland	7.67	3
5	Just Kwaou-Mathey	France	7.67	
6	Damion Thomas	Jamaica	7.67	
7	Vladimir Vukicevic	Norway	7.71	
8	Michael Dickson	United States	7.72	

Men's 60mH Round 1
Place	Athlete	Country	Time	Heat
1	Grant Holloway	United States	7.40	2
2	Daniel Roberts	United States	7.58	1
3	Damion Thomas	Jamaica	7.65	1
4	Just Kwaou-Mathey	France	7.70	1
5	Jakub Szymański	Poland	7.70	2
6	Michael Dickson	United States	7.72	2
7	Pascal Martinot-Lagarde	France	7.73	1
8	Vladimir Vukicevic	Norway	7.73	2
9	Kevin Mayer	France	7.80	2
10	Raphaël Mohamed	France	7.84	2
11	Eduardo de Deus	Brazil	7.88	1
12	Job Geerds	Netherlands	7.89	2
13	David Ryba	Czech Republic	7.91	1
	Koen Smet	Netherlands	DQ	1

Men's Long Jump
Place	Athlete	Country	Mark	Points
1st place, gold medalist(s)	Miltiadis Tentoglou	Greece	8.41 m	10
2nd place, silver medalist(s)	Thobias Montler	Sweden	8.06 m	7
3rd place, bronze medalist(s)	Marquis Dendy	United States	7.94 m	5
4	Maykel Massó	Cuba	7.94 m	3
5	Erwan Konaté	France	7.73 m	
6	Zhang Jingqiang	China	7.64 m	
7	Jules Pommery	France	7.63 m	

Women's 800m
Place	Athlete	Country	Time	Points
1st place, gold medalist(s)	Keely Hodgkinson	Great Britain	1:57.71	10
2nd place, silver medalist(s)	Mary Moraa	Kenya	2:00.61	7
3rd place, bronze medalist(s)	Noélie Yarigo	Benin	2:01.47	5
4	Halimah Nakaayi	Uganda	2:01.85	3
5	Agnès Raharolahy	France	2:02.02	
6	Catriona Bisset	Australia	2:02.03	
7	Lore Hoffmann	Switzerland	2:02.12	
8	Elena Bellò	Italy	2:03.00	
	Naomi Korir	Kenya	DNF	

Women's 3000m
Place	Athlete	Country	Time	Points
1st place, gold medalist(s)	Diribe Welteji	Ethiopia	8:34.84	10
2nd place, silver medalist(s)	Lemlem Hailu	Ethiopia	8:35.15	7
3rd place, bronze medalist(s)	Mizan Alem	Ethiopia	8:39.03	5
4	Sarah Chelangat	Uganda	8:41.16	3
5	Ayal Dagnachew	Ethiopia	8:45.24	
6	Nadia Battocletti	Italy	8:45.32	
7	Mekedes Alemeshete	Ethiopia	8:46.70	
8	Zerfe Wondemagegn	Ethiopia	8:46.98	
9	Maruša Mišmaš-Zrimšek	Slovenia	8:47.98	
10	Alice Finot	France	8:52.32	
11	Tsiyon Abebe	Ethiopia	9:00.55	
	Haile Gebru Tsihay	Ethiopia	DNF	
	Sembo Almayew	Ethiopia	DNF	
	Charlotte Mouchet	France	DNF	

Women's Pole Vault
Place	Athlete	Country	Mark	Points
1st place, gold medalist(s)	Katie Moon	United States	4.83 m	10
2nd place, silver medalist(s)	Tina Šutej	Slovenia	4.78 m	7
3rd place, bronze medalist(s)	Alysha Newman	Canada	4.71 m	5
4	Katerina Stefanidi	Greece	4.60 m	3
5	Emily Grove	United States	4.45 m	
6	Wilma Murto	Finland	4.45 m	
7	Xu Huiqin	China	4.45 m	
8	Ninon Chapelle	France	4.45 m	
9	Roberta Bruni	Italy	4.30 m	
10	Alix Dehaynain	France	4.30 m	
	Marie-Julie Bonnin	France	NM	
	Elina Lampela	Finland	NM	

Women's Triple Jump
Place	Athlete	Country	Mark	Points
1st place, gold medalist(s)	Liadagmis Povea	Cuba	14.81 m	10
2nd place, silver medalist(s)	Leyanis Pérez	Cuba	14.65 m	7
3rd place, bronze medalist(s)	Maryna Bekh-Romanchuk	Ukraine	14.01 m	5
4	Tuğba Danışmaz	Turkey	13.98 m	3
5	Dariya Derkach	Italy	13.95 m	
6	Neja Filipič	Slovenia	13.76 m	
7	Kristiina Mäkelä	Finland	13.62 m	
8	Tori Franklin	United States	13.10 m	

=== Indoor Meeting ===
Men's 60m
Place	Athlete	Country	Time
1st place, gold medalist(s)	Ferdinand Omanyala	Kenya	6.54
2nd place, silver medalist(s)	Marcell Jacobs	Italy	6.57
3rd place, bronze medalist(s)	Arthur Cissé	Ivory Coast	6.59
4	Ján Volko	Slovakia	6.66
5	Karl Erik Nazarov	Estonia	6.69
6	Méba-Mickaël Zeze	France	6.70
7	Aymeric Priam	France	6.74
8	Ertan Özkan	Turkey	6.78

Men's 60m Round 1
Place	Athlete	Country	Time	Heat
1	Ferdinand Omanyala	Kenya	6.58	1
2	Arthur Cissé	Ivory Coast	6.63	1
3	Marcell Jacobs	Italy	6.64	2
4	Ján Volko	Slovakia	6.69	2
5	Aymeric Priam	France	6.71	2
6	Méba-Mickaël Zeze	France	6.72	2
7	Karl Erik Nazarov	Estonia	6.73	1
8	Ertan Özkan	Turkey	6.73	1
9	Shuhei Tada	Japan	6.73	2
10	Pablo Matéo	France	6.74	1
11	Jeff Erius	France	6.75	1
12	Rendel Vermeulen	Belgium	7.04	2

Men's 400m
Place	Athlete	Country	Time	Heat
1st place, gold medalist(s)	Karsten Warholm	Norway	45.51	1
2nd place, silver medalist(s)	Alexander Doom	Belgium	46.29	2
3rd place, bronze medalist(s)	Lionel Spitz	Switzerland	46.57	2
4	Isayah Boers	Netherlands	46.60	1
5	Hamza Dair	Morocco	46.80	2
6	Julien Watrin	Belgium	46.86	2
7	Dylan Borlée	Belgium	47.49	1
8	Alexis Laloyer	France	47.57	1

Men's 800m
Place	Athlete	Country	Time	Heat
1st place, gold medalist(s)	Tony van Diepen	Netherlands	1:46.36	2
2nd place, silver medalist(s)	Mouad Zahafi	Morocco	1:46.64	2
3rd place, bronze medalist(s)	Benjamin Robert	France	1:46.78	1
4	Eliott Crestan	Belgium	1:47.23	1
5	Amel Tuka	Bosnia and Herzegovina	1:47.86	1
6	Álvaro de Arriba	Spain	1:47.87	2
7	John Fitzsimons	Ireland	1:47.92	2
8	Andreas Kramer	Sweden	1:47.97	1
9	Catalin Tecuceanu	Italy	1:48.28	1
10	Hugo Houyez	France	1:48.43	2
11	Cornelius Tuwei	Kenya	1:48.62	2
12	Abdelati El Guesse	Morocco	1:49.04	1
13	Mateusz Borkowski	Poland	1:49.18	1
14	Collins Kipruto	Kenya	1:49.78	1
15	Nicholas Kiplangat Kebenei	Kenya	1:51.49	2
	Patryk Sieradzki	Poland	DNF	1
	Khalid Benmahdi	Algeria	DNF	2

Men's 3000m
Place	Athlete	Country	Time
1st place, gold medalist(s)	Lamecha Girma	Ethiopia	7:23.81
2nd place, silver medalist(s)	Mohamed Katir	Spain	7:24.68
3rd place, bronze medalist(s)	Jacob Krop	Kenya	7:31.35
4	Birhanu Balew	Bahrain	7:33.42
5	Grant Fisher	United States	7:35.82
6	Telahun Haile Bekele	Ethiopia	7:37.96
7	Michael Kiplangat Temoi	Kenya	7:39.38
8	Salim Keddar	Algeria	7:45.94
9	Thierry Ndikumwenayo	Burundi	7:48.38
10	Mike Foppen	Netherlands	7:50.66
	Andreas Almgren	Sweden	DNF
	Tom Elmer	Switzerland	DNF
	Filip Sasínek	Czech Republic	DNF
	Mounir Akbache	France	DNF

Men's Pole Vault
Place	Athlete	Country	Mark
1st place, gold medalist(s)	Armand Duplantis	Sweden	6.01 m
2nd place, silver medalist(s)	Claudio Stecchi	Italy	5.82 m
3rd place, bronze medalist(s)	Kurtis Marschall	Australia	5.82 m
4	Jacob Wooten	United States	5.82 m
5	Chris Nilsen	United States	5.82 m
6	Rutger Koppelaar	Netherlands	5.73 m
7	Menno Vloon	Netherlands	5.73 m
8	Ben Broeders	Belgium	5.64 m
9	Valentin Lavillenie	France	5.64 m
10	EJ Obiena	Philippines	5.64 m

Women's 400m
Place	Athlete	Country	Time	Heat
1st place, gold medalist(s)	Femke Bol	Netherlands	50.20	1
2nd place, silver medalist(s)	Natalia Kaczmarek	Poland	50.90	2
3rd place, bronze medalist(s)	Anna Kiełbasińska	Poland	51.40	1
4	Lieke Klaver	Netherlands	51.42	2
5	Lada Vondrová	Czech Republic	52.57	2
6	Ama Pipi	Great Britain	52.80	2
7	Viktoriya Tkachuk	Ukraine	53.96	1
8	Kylie Lambert	Belgium	54.39	1
9	Sokhna Lacoste	France	54.63	1
10	Léa Thery-Demarque	France	56.60	2

Women's 1500m
Place	Athlete	Country	Time
1st place, gold medalist(s)	Gudaf Tsegay	Ethiopia	3:57.47
2nd place, silver medalist(s)	Hirut Meshesha	Ethiopia	4:02.01
3rd place, bronze medalist(s)	Freweyni Hailu	Ethiopia	4:02.47
4	Axumawit Embaye	Ethiopia	4:06.15
5	Hanna Klein	Germany	4:06.23
6	Winnie Nanyondo	Uganda	4:06.43
7	Adelle Tracey	Jamaica	4:10.14
8	Bérénice Cleyet-Merle	France	4:10.15
9	Fedra Luna	Argentina	4:13.72
	Saron Berhe	Ethiopia	DNF
	Aneta Lemiesz	Poland	DNF
