= 2024 Meeting Hauts-de-France Pas-de-Calais =

Indoor athletics meeting in Liévin, France

- Dates: 10 February 2024
- Host city: Liévin, France
- Venue: Arena Stade Couvert
- Level: 2024 World Athletics Indoor Tour

The 2024 Meeting Hauts-de-France Pas-de-Calais was the 30th edition of the annual indoor athletics meeting in Liévin, France. Held on 10 February, it was the fifth leg of the 2024 World Athletics Indoor Tour Gold series – the highest-level international indoor track and field athletics circuit.

Although no world records were set at the meeting, four top-five all-time marks were set, by Lamecha Girma in the 2000 metres short track (#2 all-time), Gudaf Tsegay in the 3000 metres short track (#3 all-time), Grant Holloway in the 60 metres hurdles (#4 all-time), and Femke Bol in the 400 metres short track (#4 all-time). In Tsegay's case, the failed record attempt was blamed on having to run around lapped competitors.

== Results ==
=== World Athletics Indoor Tour ===
Men's 800m
Place	Athlete	Country	Time	Heat	Points
1st place, gold medalist(s)	Eliott Crestan	Belgium	1:45.10	1	10
2nd place, silver medalist(s)	Mohamed Ali Gouaned	Algeria	1:45.35	2	7
3rd place, bronze medalist(s)	Mariano García	Spain	1:45.50	1	5
4	Benjamin Robert	France	1:45.70	1	3
5	Adrián Ben	Spain	1:46.06	1	
6	Yanis Meziane	France	1:46.08	1	
7	Ngeno Kipngetich	Kenya	1:47.21	2	
8	Daniel Rowden	Great Britain	1:47.38	2	
9	Collins Kipruto	Kenya	1:48.15	2	
10	Simone Barontini	Italy	1:48.84	2	
11	Kelvin Kimutai	Kenya	1:49.21	2	
12	Mostafa Smaili	Morocco	1:49.38	2	
13	Tony van Diepen	Netherlands	1:50.94	1	
	Patryk Sieradzki	Poland	DNF	1	
	Khalid Benmahdi	Algeria	DNF	2	

Men's 3000m
Place	Athlete	Country	Time	Points
1st place, gold medalist(s)	Selemon Barega	Ethiopia	7:31.38	10
2nd place, silver medalist(s)	Biniam Mehary	Ethiopia	7:33.04	7
3rd place, bronze medalist(s)	Getnet Wale	Ethiopia	7:35.04	5
4	Dominic Lokinyomo Lobalu	Switzerland	7:39.32	3
5	Mezgebu Sime	Ethiopia	7:40.81	
6	Hugo Hay	France	7:40.95	
7	John Heymans	Belgium	7:41.59	
8	Samuel Tefera	Ethiopia	7:46.65	
9	Per Svela	Norway	8:00.97	
10	Diriba Girma	Ethiopia	8:05.85	
	Kyumbe Munguti	Kenya	DNF	
	Filip Sasínek	Czech Republic	DNF	
	Mounir Akbache	France	DNF	

Men's Pole Vault
Place	Athlete	Country	Mark	Points
1st place, gold medalist(s)	Sam Kendricks	United States	5.76 m	10
2nd place, silver medalist(s)	Thibaut Collet	France	5.70 m	7
3rd place, bronze medalist(s)	Piotr Lisek	Poland	5.70 m	5
4	Menno Vloon	Netherlands	5.60 m	3
5	Bo Kanda Lita Baehre	Germany	5.60 m	
6	Kurtis Marschall	Australia	5.60 m	
7	Torben Blech	Germany	5.45 m	
8	Baptiste Thiery	France	5.45 m	
9	Jacob Wooten	United States	5.45 m	
	Ben Broeders	Belgium	NM	

Men's Triple Jump
Place	Athlete	Country	Mark	Points
1st place, gold medalist(s)	Hugues Fabrice Zango	Burkina Faso	17.21 m	10
2nd place, silver medalist(s)	Yasser Triki	Algeria	17.18 m	7
3rd place, bronze medalist(s)	Jean-Marc Pontvianne	France	17.13 m	5
4	Emmanuel Ihemeje	Italy	16.93 m	3
5	Lázaro Martínez	Cuba	16.87 m	
6	Simo Lipsanen	Finland	16.42 m	
7	Tobia Bocchi	Italy	16.33 m	

Men's Shot Put
Place	Athlete	Country	Mark	Points
1st place, gold medalist(s)	Leonardo Fabbri	Italy	22.37 m	10
2nd place, silver medalist(s)	Tom Walsh	New Zealand	22.16 m	7
3rd place, bronze medalist(s)	Tomáš Staněk	Czech Republic	21.32 m	5
4	Zane Weir	Italy	21.03 m	3
5	Bob Bertemes	Luxembourg	21.01 m	
6	Filip Mihaljević	Croatia	20.86 m	
7	Scott Lincoln	Great Britain	20.54 m	

Women's 400m
Place	Athlete	Country	Time	Heat	Points
1st place, gold medalist(s)	Femke Bol	Netherlands	49.63	1	10
2nd place, silver medalist(s)	Lieke Klaver	Netherlands	50.50	1	7
3rd place, bronze medalist(s)	Laviai Nielsen	Great Britain	51.11	2	5
4	Andrea Miklós	Romania	51.23	2	3
5	Naomi Van Den Broeck	Belgium	52.23	1	
6	Amandine Brossier	France	52.27	1	
7	Camille Séri	France	52.72	2	
8	Nicole Yeargin	Great Britain	53.49	3	
9	Jessie Knight	Great Britain	53.51	3	
10	Ayomide Folorunso	Italy	53.54	3	
11	Viivi Lehikoinen	Finland	54.03	2	
12	Eveline Saalberg	Netherlands	54.85	2	
13	Léa Thery-Demarque	France	54.94	3	
14	Kylie Lambert	Belgium	55.15	3	

Women's 1500m
Place	Athlete	Country	Time	Points
1st place, gold medalist(s)	Freweyni Hailu	Ethiopia	3:57.24	10
2nd place, silver medalist(s)	Diribe Welteji	Ethiopia	3:57.48	7
3rd place, bronze medalist(s)	Birke Haylom	Ethiopia	4:00.00	5
4	Habitam Alemu	Ethiopia	4:00.97	3
5	Sarah Healy	Ireland	4:03.83	
6	Netsanet Desta	Ethiopia	4:04.24	
7	Agathe Guillemot	France	4:04.64	
8	Revée Walcott-Nolan	Great Britain	4:04.64	
9	Esther Guerrero	Spain	4:05.27	
	Salomé Afonso	Portugal	DNF	
	Naomi Korir	Kenya	DNF	
	Axumawit Embaye	Ethiopia	DNF	
	Aneta Lemiesz	Poland	DNF	
	Aleksandra Płocińska	Poland	DNF	

Women's 60mH
Place	Athlete	Country	Time	Points
1st place, gold medalist(s)	Tobi Amusan	Nigeria	7.83	10
2nd place, silver medalist(s)	Laëticia Bapté	France	7.97	7
3rd place, bronze medalist(s)	Sarah Lavin	Ireland	7.98	5
4	Charisma Taylor	Bahamas	8.00	3
5	Solenn Compper	France	8.03	
6	Luca Kozák	Hungary	8.22	
	Nadine Visser	Netherlands	DNF	
	Pia Skrzyszowska	Poland	DQ	

Women's 60mH Round 1
Place	Athlete	Country	Time	Heat
1	Pia Skrzyszowska	Poland	7.85	1
2	Tobi Amusan	Nigeria	7.87	2
3	Nadine Visser	Netherlands	7.95	2
4	Charisma Taylor	Bahamas	8.00	1
5	Sarah Lavin	Ireland	8.02	1
6	Laëticia Bapté	France	8.02	2
7	Luca Kozák	Hungary	8.05	2
8	Solenn Compper	France	8.06	2
9	Natalia Christofi	Cyprus	8.11	1
10	Marika Majewska	Poland	8.18	1
11	Mette Graversgaard	Denmark	8.20	2
12	Klaudia Siciarz	Poland	8.23	2

=== Indoor Meeting ===
Men's 200m
Place	Athlete	Country	Time	Heat
1st place, gold medalist(s)	Erriyon Knighton	United States	20.21	1
2nd place, silver medalist(s)	Ryan Zeze	France	20.56	1
3rd place, bronze medalist(s)	Blessing Afrifah	Israel	20.69	2
4	Łukasz Żok	Poland	20.98	2
5	Xavi Mo-Ajok	Netherlands	21.21	1
6	Hensley Paulina	Netherlands	21.38	2

Men's 1500m
Place	Athlete	Country	Time
1st place, gold medalist(s)	Azeddine Habz	France	3:34.39
2nd place, silver medalist(s)	Vincent Kibet Keter	Kenya	3:34.44
3rd place, bronze medalist(s)	Robert Farken	Germany	3:36.11
4	Adel Mechaal	Spain	3:37.23
5	Narve Gilje Nordås	Norway	3:37.45
6	Tshepo Tshite	South Africa	3:37.56
7	Ignacio Fontes	Spain	3:37.86
8	Ruben Verheyden	Belgium	3:39.19
9	Romain Mornet	France	3:39.44
10	Teddese Lemi	Ethiopia	3:41.33
11	Pierrik Jocteur-Monrozier	France	3:46.35
	Ismael Debjani	Belgium	DNF
	Collins Kipruto	Kenya	DNF
	Adam Czerwiński	Poland	DNF

Men's 2000m
Place	Athlete	Country	Time
1st place, gold medalist(s)	Lamecha Girma	Ethiopia	4:51.23
2nd place, silver medalist(s)	Samuel Pihlström	Sweden	5:00.01
3rd place, bronze medalist(s)	Charles Grethen	Luxembourg	5:01.89
4	Nick Griggs	Ireland	5:01.98
5	Federico Riva	Italy	5:02.67
6	Ferdinand Kvan Edman	Norway	5:03.41
7	Benoît Campion	France	5:04.55
8	Robin van Riel	Netherlands	5:06.10
9	Brian Komen	Kenya	5:07.31
10	Melese Nberet	Ethiopia	5:07.54
	Samuel Abate	Ethiopia	DNF
	Martin Desmidt	France	DNF
	Boaz Kiprugut	Kenya	DNF
	Mohad Abdikadar	Italy	DNF
	Moa Abounnachat Bollerød	Norway	DNF
	Adisu Girma	Ethiopia	DNF

Men's 60mH
Place	Athlete	Country	Time
1st place, gold medalist(s)	Grant Holloway	United States	7.32
2nd place, silver medalist(s)	Just Kwaou-Mathey	France	7.43
3rd place, bronze medalist(s)	Jakub Szymański	Poland	7.48
4	Lorenzo Simonelli	Italy	7.52
5	Michael Obasuyi	Belgium	7.61
6	Enrique Llopis	Spain	7.62
7	Job Geerds	Netherlands	7.65
8	Elie Bacari	Belgium	7.73

Men's 60mH Round 1
Place	Athlete	Country	Time	Heat
1	Grant Holloway	United States	7.39	2
2	Lorenzo Simonelli	Italy	7.51	2
3	Just Kwaou-Mathey	France	7.52	1
4	Jakub Szymański	Poland	7.56	1
5	Elie Bacari	Belgium	7.61	2
6	Enrique Llopis	Spain	7.62	1
7	Michael Obasuyi	Belgium	7.62	1
8	Job Geerds	Netherlands	7.64	1
9	Damian Czykier	Poland	7.65	2
10	Tade Ojora	Great Britain	7.66	2
11	David King	Great Britain	7.67	1
12	Krzysztof Kiljan	Poland	7.71	2
13	Jamal Britt	United States	7.73	2
14	Erwann Cinna	France	7.80	1
15	Raphaël Mohamed	France	7.87	2

Women's 800m
Place	Athlete	Country	Time
1st place, gold medalist(s)	Jemma Reekie	Great Britain	2:00.40
2nd place, silver medalist(s)	Noélie Yarigo	Benin	2:01.19
3rd place, bronze medalist(s)	Audrey Werro	Switzerland	2:01.43
4	Halimah Nakaayi	Uganda	2:01.46
5	Lore Hoffmann	Switzerland	2:01.88
6	Eloisa Coiro	Italy	2:02.25
7	Léna Kandissounon	France	2:02.88
8	Worknesh Mesele	Ethiopia	2:03.62
9	Agnès Raharolahy	France	2:03.66
	Valentina Rosamilia	Switzerland	DNF

Women's 3000m
Place	Athlete	Country	Time
1st place, gold medalist(s)	Gudaf Tsegay	Ethiopia	8:17.11
2nd place, silver medalist(s)	Hirut Meshesha	Ethiopia	8:29.71
3rd place, bronze medalist(s)	Beatrice Chepkoech	Kenya	8:30.87
4	Wubrist Aschal	Ethiopia	8:40.97
5	Winnie Jemutai	Kenya	8:45.17
6	Águeda Marqués	Spain	8:46.24
7	Marwa Bouzayani	Tunisia	8:46.45
8	Sembo Almayew	Ethiopia	8:53.64
9	Gela Hambese	Ethiopia	8:57.73
10	Ayal Dagnachew	Ethiopia	9:02.45
11	Mekedes Alemeshete	Ethiopia	9:10.65
	Lemlem Hailu	Ethiopia	DNF
	Worknesh Mesele	Ethiopia	DNF
	Lydia Jeruto Lagat	Kenya	DNF
	Saron Berhe	Ethiopia	DNF

Women's Pole Vault
Place	Athlete	Country	Mark
1st place, gold medalist(s)	Eliza McCartney	New Zealand	4.84 m
2nd place, silver medalist(s)	Molly Caudery	Great Britain	4.75 m
3rd place, bronze medalist(s)	Wilma Murto	Finland	4.75 m
4	Alysha Newman	Canada	4.75 m
5	Margot Chevrier	France	4.65 m
6	Angelica Moser	Switzerland	4.65 m
7	Tina Šutej	Slovenia	4.65 m
8	Roberta Bruni	Italy	4.50 m
9	Ninon Chapelle	France	4.50 m
	Alix Dehaynain	France	NM

=== National events ===
Men's 400m
Place	Athlete	Country	Time
1st place, gold medalist(s)	Mickael Morice	France	49.72
2nd place, silver medalist(s)	Maxime Wrzesinski	France	49.81
3rd place, bronze medalist(s)	Mathis Vaz Carrondo	France	50.17
4	Quinten Lockefeer	Belgium	50.57
5	Jocelyn Dusautoir	France	51.95

Men's 800m
Place	Athlete	Country	Time
1st place, gold medalist(s)	Matthieu Lahousse	France	1:54.05
2nd place, silver medalist(s)	Leandre Lalin	France	1:54.86
3rd place, bronze medalist(s)	Lucas Devarenne	France	1:55.26
4	Antony Martin	France	1:57.80
5	Lilian Schotte	France	1:58.12
6	Adrien Lanfle	France	1:58.45
7	Nicolas Loisel	France	1:58.62
8	Paul Thirard	France	1:58.65
9	William Rudloff	France	2:03.44

Men's 1500m
Place	Athlete	Country	Time
1st place, gold medalist(s)	Victor Boudin	France	3:48.23
2nd place, silver medalist(s)	Quentin Vandier	France	3:48.36
3rd place, bronze medalist(s)	Alexis Regent	France	3:49.09
4	Sacha Liguori	France	3:49.53
5	Louis-Lys Fanucchi	France	3:51.30
6	Maxence Verpraet	France	3:51.75
7	Cyril Meersseman	France	3:54.05
8	Antonin Marquant	France	3:55.63
9	Christopher Gabet	France	3:56.84
10	Enrique Guerlain	France	3:56.99
11	Kevin Lemaire	France	3:58.95
12	Simon Deproot	France	4:04.34

Women's 400m
Place	Athlete	Country	Time
1st place, gold medalist(s)	Imke Vervaet	Belgium	53.46
2nd place, silver medalist(s)	Chloë Van Der Meulen	Belgium	55.71
3rd place, bronze medalist(s)	Anais Guiot	France	57.17
4	Laurence Jones	Luxembourg	57.61
5	Adele Pailleux	France	57.86

Women's 800m
Place	Athlete	Country	Time
1st place, gold medalist(s)	Flavie Dambry	France	2:08.32
2nd place, silver medalist(s)	Maaike Vander Cruyssen	Belgium	2:08.96
3rd place, bronze medalist(s)	Elisa Sarrant	France	2:09.07
4	Agathe Delahoutre	France	2:09.83
5	Maeva Verheyden	France	2:10.00
6	Sana Hammami	France	2:12.25
7	Noemie Vermeersch	France	2:13.00
8	Julie Bonardi	France	2:13.10

Women's 1500m
Place	Athlete	Country	Time
1st place, gold medalist(s)	Stecy Dolay	France	4:37.08
2nd place, silver medalist(s)	Noémie Brioul	France	4:38.98
3rd place, bronze medalist(s)	Maelle Fuchs	France	4:41.03
4	Jeanne Cucheval	France	4:41.51
5	Eugenie Prouvost	France	4:42.00
6	Zoe Duigou	France	4:44.10
7	Caroline Scaps	France	4:46.65
8	Justine Brazy Lechien	France	4:48.75
9	Audrey Berraz	France	4:56.66
