= 2022 Memorial Van Damme =

- Dates: 2 September (shot put held on 1 September)
- Host city: Brussels, Belgium
- Venue: King Baudouin Stadium
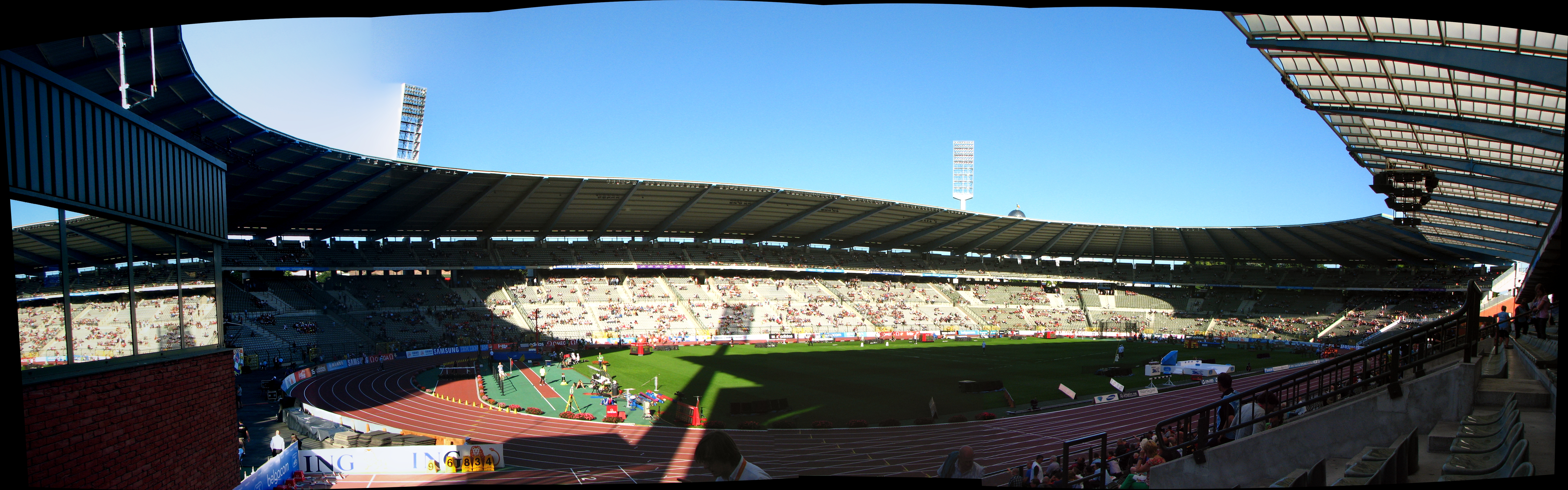
- Level: 2022 Diamond League

The 2022 Memorial Van Damme was the 46th edition of the annual track and field meeting in Brussels, Belgium. Held on 2 September at the King Baudouin Stadium, it was the twelfth and penultimate leg of the 2022 Diamond League – the highest level international track and field circuit. The shot put event was held on 1 September, the day before the rest of the meeting. Although Memorial Van Damme and Weltklasse Zürich co-hosted the finals in 2019, in 2021 and 2022 the series moved to a single final in Zürich.

For Americans, the meeting was highlighted by Grant Fisher losing to Jacob Krop but running 12:46.96 to break the American record over 5000 metres.

Pre-race favorites Mondo Duplantis, Shelly-Ann Fraser-Pryce, and Laura Muir were upset by Ernest John Obiena, Shericka Jackson, and Ciara Mageean. Erriyon Knighton won the 200 metres as an 18 year old, while Kara Winger won the javelin throw 12 years after she was the last American to win the event at a Diamond League competition.

== Results ==
Athletes competing in the Diamond League disciplines earned extra compensation and points which went towards qualifying for the Diamond League finals in Zürich. First place earned 8 points, with each step down in place earning one less point than the previous, until no points are awarded in 9th place or lower.

=== Diamond Discipline ===
Men's Shot Put
Place	Athlete	Country	Mark	Points
1st place, gold medalist(s)	Joe Kovacs	United States	22.61 m	8
2nd place, silver medalist(s)	Tom Walsh	New Zealand	21.60 m	7
3rd place, bronze medalist(s)	Jacko Gill	New Zealand	21.32 m	6
4	Filip Mihaljević	Croatia	21.13 m	5
5	Nick Ponzio	Italy	21.06 m	4
6	Adrian Piperi	United States	20.88 m	3
7	Armin Sinančević	Serbia	20.84 m	2
8	Josh Awotunde	United States	20.69 m	1

Men's 200m (−2.8 m/s)
Place	Athlete	Country	Time	Points
1st place, gold medalist(s)	Erriyon Knighton	United States	20.07	8
2nd place, silver medalist(s)	Alexander Ogando	Dominican Republic	20.18	7
3rd place, bronze medalist(s)	Aaron Brown	Canada	20.22	6
4	Jereem Richards	Trinidad and Tobago	20.27	5
5	Reynier Mena	Cuba	20.38	4
6	Joseph Fahnbulleh	Liberia	20.60	3
7	Robin Vanderbemden	Belgium	21.02	2
8	Fausto Desalu	Italy	21.09	1

Men's 800m
Place	Athlete	Country	Time	Points
1st place, gold medalist(s)	Jake Wightman	Great Britain	1:43.65	8
2nd place, silver medalist(s)	Djamel Sedjati	Algeria	1:44.12	7
3rd place, bronze medalist(s)	Emmanuel Korir	Kenya	1:44.12	6
4	Eliott Crestan	Belgium	1:44.24	5
5	Marco Arop	Canada	1:44.48	4
6	Wyclife Kinyamal	Kenya	1:44.49	3
7	Mariano García	Spain	1:44.86	2
8	Ferguson Rotich	Kenya	1:45.16	1
9	Collins Kipruto	Kenya	1:45.61	
10	Gabriel Tual	France	1:45.64	
11	Benjamin Robert	France	1:47.94	
	Khalid Benmahdi	Algeria	DNF	

Men's 5000m
Place	Athlete	Country	Time	Points
1st place, gold medalist(s)	Jacob Krop	Kenya	12:45.71	8
2nd place, silver medalist(s)	Grant Fisher	United States	12:46.96	7
3rd place, bronze medalist(s)	Nicholas Kimeli	Kenya	12:50.97	6
4	Dominic Lokinyomo Lobalu	South Sudan	12:52.15	5
5	Daniel Ebenyo	Kenya	12:54.90	4
6	Stewart McSweyn	Australia	12:56.50	3
7	Oscar Chelimo	Uganda	13:00.42	2
8	Andreas Almgren	Sweden	13:01.70	1
9	Luis Grijalva	Guatemala	13:02.94	
10	Cornelius Kemboi	Kenya	13:03.49	
11	Thierry Ndikumwenayo	Burundi	13:10.71	
12	Woody Kincaid	United States	13:13.90	
13	Joe Klecker	United States	13:15.17	
14	Stanley Mburu	Kenya	13:24.43	
15	Robin Hendrix	Belgium	13:32.68	
	Wilberforce Chemiat Kones	Kenya	DNF	
	Emmanuel Kiprop	Kenya	DNF	
	Yomif Kejelcha	Ethiopia	DNF	
	Mounir Akbache	France	DNF	

Men's 400mH
Place	Athlete	Country	Time	Points
1st place, gold medalist(s)	Alison dos Santos	Brazil	47.54	8
2nd place, silver medalist(s)	Khallifah Rosser	United States	47.88	7
3rd place, bronze medalist(s)	Wilfried Happio	France	48.61	6
4	Julien Watrin	Belgium	48.66	5
5	Constantin Preis	Germany	48.83	4
6	Yasmani Copello	Turkey	48.83	3
7	İsmail Nezir	Turkey	49.92	2
	CJ Allen	United States	DQ	

Men's Pole Vault
Place	Athlete	Country	Mark	Points
1st place, gold medalist(s)	EJ Obiena	Philippines	5.91 m	8
2nd place, silver medalist(s)	Armand Duplantis	Sweden	5.81 m	7
3rd place, bronze medalist(s)	Chris Nilsen	United States	5.71 m	6
4	Rutger Koppelaar	Netherlands	5.71 m	5
5	Thiago Braz	Brazil	5.71 m	4
6	Renaud Lavillenie	France	5.61 m	3
7	Oleg Zernikel	Germany	5.61 m	2
8	Sondre Guttormsen	Norway	5.41 m	1
	Pål Haugen Lillefosse	Norway	NM	
	Ben Broeders	Belgium	NM	

Men's Triple Jump
Place	Athlete	Country	Mark	Points
1st place, gold medalist(s)	Lázaro Martínez	Cuba	17.49 m (+0.1 m/s)	8
2nd place, silver medalist(s)	Hugues Fabrice Zango	Burkina Faso	17.40 m (−0.1 m/s)	7
3rd place, bronze medalist(s)	Almir dos Santos	Brazil	16.81 m (+0.5 m/s)	6
4	Christian Taylor	United States	16.72 m (−0.1 m/s)	5
5	Donald Scott	United States	16.56 m (+0.2 m/s)	4
6	Jean-Marc Pontvianne	France	16.51 m (+0.1 m/s)	3
7	Zhu Yaming	China	16.39 m (−0.1 m/s)	2
8	Tobia Bocchi	Italy	16.30 m (+0.1 m/s)	1

Women's 100m (+0.6 m/s)
Place	Athlete	Country	Time	Points
1st place, gold medalist(s)	Shericka Jackson	Jamaica	10.73	8
2nd place, silver medalist(s)	Shelly-Ann Fraser-Pryce	Jamaica	10.74	7
3rd place, bronze medalist(s)	Marie-Josée Ta Lou	Ivory Coast	10.78	6
4	Aleia Hobbs	United States	10.91	5
5	Sha'Carri Richardson	United States	10.93	4
6	Tamara Clark	United States	11.03	3
7	Aminatou Seyni	Niger	11.15	2
8	Delphine Nkansa	Belgium	11.29	1

Women's 400m
Place	Athlete	Country	Time	Points
1st place, gold medalist(s)	Fiordaliza Cofil	Dominican Republic	49.80	8
2nd place, silver medalist(s)	Sada Williams	Barbados	50.15	7
3rd place, bronze medalist(s)	Cynthia Bolingo	Belgium	50.19	6
4	Mary Moraa	Kenya	50.67	5
5	Candice McLeod	Jamaica	50.76	4
6	Lieke Klaver	Netherlands	50.87	3
7	Anna Kiełbasińska	Poland	51.63	2
8	Stephenie Ann McPherson	Jamaica	51.73	1

Women's 1500m
Place	Athlete	Country	Time	Points
1st place, gold medalist(s)	Ciara Mageean	Ireland	3:56.63	8
2nd place, silver medalist(s)	Laura Muir	Great Britain	3:56.86	7
3rd place, bronze medalist(s)	Freweyni Hailu	Ethiopia	3:56.94	6
4	Diribe Welteji	Ethiopia	3:57.82	5
5	Heather MacLean	United States	3:58.76	4
6	Elise Cranny	United States	3:59.61	3
7	Winnie Nanyondo	Uganda	3:59.91	2
8	Georgia Griffith	Australia	4:02.96	1
9	Ayal Dagnachew	Ethiopia	4:03.13	
10	Cory McGee	United States	4:04.33	
11	Elise Vanderelst	Belgium	4:04.43	
12	Jessica Hull	Australia	4:07.20	
13	Marta Pérez	Spain	4:09.22	
14	Sinclaire Johnson	United States	4:10.29	
15	Axumawit Embaye	Ethiopia	4:14.69	
	Claudia Bobocea	Romania	DNF	
	Gaia Sabbatini	Italy	DNF	
	Noélie Yarigo	Benin	DNF	

Women's 100mH (+0.1 m/s)
Place	Athlete	Country	Time	Points
1st place, gold medalist(s)	Jasmine Camacho-Quinn	Puerto Rico	12.27	8
2nd place, silver medalist(s)	Tia Jones	United States	12.38	7
3rd place, bronze medalist(s)	Kendra Harrison	United States	12.40	6
4	Britany Anderson	Jamaica	12.44	5
5	Megan Tapper	Jamaica	12.51	4
6	Devynne Charlton	Bahamas	12.66	3
7	Pia Skrzyszowska	Poland	12.81	2
8	Nadine Visser	Netherlands	12.88	1

Women's 3000mSC
Place	Athlete	Country	Time	Points
1st place, gold medalist(s)	Jackline Chepkoech	Kenya	9:02.43	8
2nd place, silver medalist(s)	Werkuha Getachew	Ethiopia	9:03.44	7
3rd place, bronze medalist(s)	Winfred Yavi	Bahrain	9:08.03	6
4	Faith Cherotich	Kenya	9:09.63	5
5	Zerfe Wondemagegn	Ethiopia	9:10.16	4
6	Sembo Almayew	Ethiopia	9:14.31	3
7	Luiza Gega	Albania	9:14.41	2
8	Emma Coburn	United States	9:14.43	1
9	Daisy Jepkemei	Kazakhstan	9:20.69	
10	Courtney Frerichs	United States	9:20.93	
11	Beatrice Chepkoech	Kenya	9:24.73	
12	Nataliya Strebkova	Ukraine	9:28.76	
13	Irene Sánchez-Escribano	Spain	9:31.33	
	Virginia Nyambura Nganga	Kenya	DNF	
	Lea Meyer	Germany	DNF	

Women's High Jump
Place	Athlete	Country	Mark	Points
1st place, gold medalist(s)	Yaroslava Mahuchikh	Ukraine	2.05 m	8
2nd place, silver medalist(s)	Eleanor Patterson	Australia	1.94 m	7
3rd place, bronze medalist(s)	Nicola Olyslagers	Australia	1.91 m	6
4	Safina Sadullayeva	Uzbekistan	1.91 m	5
5	Marija Vuković	Montenegro	1.91 m	4
6	Iryna Herashchenko	Ukraine	1.91 m	3
7	Elena Vallortigara	Italy	1.88 m	2
8	Yuliya Levchenko	Ukraine	1.88 m	1

Women's Javelin Throw
Place	Athlete	Country	Mark	Points
1st place, gold medalist(s)	Kara Winger	United States	68.11 m	8
2nd place, silver medalist(s)	Haruka Kitaguchi	Japan	63.45 m	7
3rd place, bronze medalist(s)	Adriana Vilagoš	Serbia	63.00 m	6
4	Kelsey-Lee Barber	Australia	61.07 m	5
5	Elizabeth Gleadle	Canada	60.01 m	4
6	Elina Tzengko	Greece	59.98 m	3
7	Liveta Jasiūnaitė	Lithuania	59.80 m	2
8	Barbora Špotáková	Czech Republic	58.01 m	1
9	Līna Mūze	Latvia	57.46 m	

=== Promotional Events ===
Men's 400m
Place	Athlete	Country	Time
1st place, gold medalist(s)	Kevin Borlée	Belgium	45.72
2nd place, silver medalist(s)	Christopher O'Donnell	Ireland	45.78
3rd place, bronze medalist(s)	Alexander Doom	Belgium	45.82
4	Jonathan Borlée	Belgium	45.90
5	Dylan Borlée	Belgium	46.07
6	Jochem Dobber	Netherlands	46.46
7	Jonathan Sacoor	Belgium	46.60
8	Thomas Jordier	France	47.55

Men's 1 Hour
Place	Athlete	Country	Time
1st place, gold medalist(s)	Sabastian Sawe	Kenya	21250
2nd place, silver medalist(s)	Kibiwott Kandie	Kenya	20940
3rd place, bronze medalist(s)	Albert Kipkorir Tonui	Kenya	20171
4	Emmanuel Kipchumba	Kenya	19996
5	Andreas Vojta	Austria	19635
6	Michael Kamau	Kenya	19316
	Nguse Tesfaldet Amlosom	Eritrea	DNF
	Joshua Belet	Kenya	DNF
	Levy Kibet	Kenya	DNF
	Brett Robinson	Australia	DNF

Women's 400m
Place	Athlete	Country	Time
1st place, gold medalist(s)	Amandine Brossier	France	51.74
2nd place, silver medalist(s)	Helena Ponette	Belgium	51.82
3rd place, bronze medalist(s)	Rushell Clayton	Jamaica	52.02
4	Eveline Saalberg	Netherlands	52.48
5	Camille Laus	Belgium	52.93
6	Imke Vervaet	Belgium	53.00
7	Paulien Couckuyt	Belgium	53.45
8	Nina Hespel	Belgium	54.47

Women's Long Jump
Place	Athlete	Country	Mark
1st place, gold medalist(s)	Ese Brume	Nigeria	6.83 m (+0.7 m/s)
2nd place, silver medalist(s)	Quanesha Burks	United States	6.54 m (+0.1 m/s)
3rd place, bronze medalist(s)	Larissa Iapichino	Italy	6.52 m (±0.0 m/s)
4	Nafissatou Thiam	Belgium	6.46 m (+0.3 m/s)
5	Kate Hall	United States	6.41 m (+0.4 m/s)
6	Noor Vidts	Belgium	6.40 m (+0.5 m/s)
7	Mariya Horielova	Ukraine	6.10 m (−1.0 m/s)

=== U18 Events ===
Men's 100m (+0.6 m/s)
Place	Athlete	Country	Time
1st place, gold medalist(s)	Dieter Bergs	Belgium	10.76
2nd place, silver medalist(s)	Cédric Motieh	Belgium	10.99
3rd place, bronze medalist(s)	Némo Rase	Belgium	11.06
4	Jarno Torck	Belgium	11.17
5	Maric Lechantre	Belgium	11.25
6	Joshua lo Bianco	Belgium	11.43

Men's 1000m
Place	Athlete	Country	Time
1st place, gold medalist(s)	Simon Jeukenne	Belgium	2:30.22
2nd place, silver medalist(s)	Jerome Kindt	Belgium	2:31.26
3rd place, bronze medalist(s)	Stanislav Driapko	Ukraine	2:31.72
4	Arthur Engelen	Belgium	2:33.17
5	Reda Aouragh	Belgium	2:34.59
6	Wonne Delcour	Belgium	2:34.81
7	Gust van Canneyt	Belgium	2:36.63
8	Noah Coetsier	Belgium	2:37.23
9	Martin Courtois	Belgium	2:45.28

Men's High Jump
Place	Athlete	Country	Mark
1st place, gold medalist(s)	Dai Keïta	Belgium	1.95 m
2nd place, silver medalist(s)	Flor Lambrechts	Belgium	1.85 m

Women's 100m (+0.2 m/s)
Place	Athlete	Country	Time
1st place, gold medalist(s)	Camille Sonneville	Belgium	12.17
2nd place, silver medalist(s)	Paolina Baramoto Yayu	Belgium	12.31
3rd place, bronze medalist(s)	Noor Vermeiren	Belgium	12.33
4	Noor Koekelkoren	Belgium	12.34
5	Zoë Laureys	Belgium	12.39
6	Linda Bula Bula Mechak	Belgium	12.55
7	Chloe Philippe	Belgium	13.03

Women's 1000m
Place	Athlete	Country	Time
1st place, gold medalist(s)	Charlotte Penneman	Belgium	2:50.27
2nd place, silver medalist(s)	Nina van Pelt	Belgium	2:50.87
3rd place, bronze medalist(s)	Maaike Vander Cruyssen	Belgium	2:52.03
4	Rhune Vanroose	Belgium	2:53.78
5	Hannah Enkels	Belgium	2:55.12
6	Dorien Poppe	Belgium	2:57.77
7	Juliette Lothaire	Belgium	2:58.03
8	Margaux Dossche	Belgium	2:59.21
9	Juliette Secretin	Belgium	2:59.90
10	Astrid van Breedam	Belgium	3:01.15
11	Elia Cappa	Belgium	3:01.81
12	Marie Tijtgat	Belgium	3:01.82
13	Maud de Coninck	Belgium	3:02.46
14	Cyrielle Henriques	Belgium	3:08.83
15	Noor Jacques	Belgium	3:16.80

Women's Long Jump
Place	Athlete	Country	Mark
1st place, gold medalist(s)	Laura Ooghe	Belgium	5.96 m (−0.2 m/s)
2nd place, silver medalist(s)	Elodie Francart	Belgium	5.52 m (+0.1 m/s)
3rd place, bronze medalist(s)	Yelena Boone	Belgium	5.44 m (+0.1 m/s)
4	Lenne Jacobien	Belgium	5.37 m (+0.2 m/s)
5	Norah de Bruycker	Belgium	5.26 m (+0.3 m/s)
6	Anyssa Laurent	Belgium	5.23 m (+0.3 m/s)
7	Juliette Pinson	Belgium	5.20 m (+0.2 m/s)

== See also ==
- 2022 Diamond League
- 2022 Weltklasse Zürich (2022 Diamond League final)
