= 2022 Weltklasse Zürich =

Outdoor track and field meeting in Zürich, Switzerland

- Dates: 7–8 September 2022
- Host city: Zürich, Switzerland
- Venue: Letzigrund
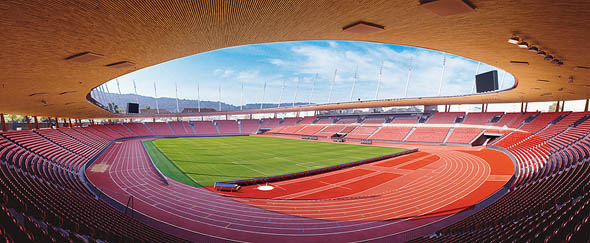
- Level: 2022 Diamond League

The 2022 Weltklasse Zürich was an outdoor track and field meeting in Zürich, Switzerland. Held on 7–8 September 2022 at the Letzigrund, it served as the finals of the 2022 Diamond League – the highest level international track and field circuit. It was the second time that Zürich exclusively hosted the Diamond League finals, after the 2021 edition.

The meeting was highlighted by 2022 world leads from Jakob Ingebrigtsen, Marileidy Paulino, and Emmanuel Korir on the track. Despite headwinds, the women's sprints were fast with Shelly-Ann Fraser-Pryce running 10.65 in the 100 metres.

== Results ==
While Diamond League points were used to gain entry into the finals, they were not used to determine Diamond League champions. Regardless of points accumulated throughout the season, winners of the 2022 Weltklasse Zürich were crowned 2022 Diamond League champions in their respective events.

=== Diamond Discipline ===
Men's High Jump
Place	Athlete	Country	Mark
1st place, gold medalist(s)	Gianmarco Tamberi	Italy	2.34 m
2nd place, silver medalist(s)	JuVaughn Harrison	United States	2.34 m
3rd place, bronze medalist(s)	Django Lovett	Canada	2.27 m
4	Andriy Protsenko	Ukraine	2.24 m
5	Hamish Kerr	New Zealand	2.21 m
6	Mutaz Essa Barshim	Qatar	2.18 m

Men's Shot Put
Place	Athlete	Country	Mark
1st place, gold medalist(s)	Joe Kovacs	United States	23.23 m
2nd place, silver medalist(s)	Ryan Crouser	United States	22.74 m
3rd place, bronze medalist(s)	Tom Walsh	New Zealand	21.90 m
4	Jacko Gill	New Zealand	21.51 m
5	Filip Mihaljević	Croatia	21.43 m
6	Nick Ponzio	Italy	20.71 m

Men's 5 km Road Race
Place	Athlete	Country	Time
1st place, gold medalist(s)	Nicholas Kimeli	Kenya	13:00
2nd place, silver medalist(s)	Dominic Lokinyomo Lobalu	South Sudan	13:00
3rd place, bronze medalist(s)	Grant Fisher	United States	13:01
4	Telahun Haile Bekele	Ethiopia	13:03
5	Berihu Aregawi	Ethiopia	13:04
6	Cornelius Kemboi	Kenya	13:10
7	Selemon Barega	Ethiopia	13:14
	Thierry Ndikumwenayo	Burundi	DNF
	Yomif Kejelcha	Ethiopia	DNF
	Jacob Krop	Kenya	DNF
	Maximilian Thorwirth	Germany	DNF

Women's Pole Vault
Place	Athlete	Country	Mark
1st place, gold medalist(s)	Nina Kennedy	Australia	4.81 m
2nd place, silver medalist(s)	Sandi Morris	United States	4.76 m
3rd place, bronze medalist(s)	Tina Šutej	Slovenia	4.61 m
4	Roberta Bruni	Italy	4.61 m
5	Wilma Murto	Finland	4.61 m
6	Katerina Stefanidi	Greece	4.51 m
7	Angelica Moser	Switzerland	4.51 m

Women's Shot Put
Place	Athlete	Country	Mark
1st place, gold medalist(s)	Chase Ealey	United States	20.19 m
2nd place, silver medalist(s)	Sarah Mitton	Canada	19.56 m
3rd place, bronze medalist(s)	Auriol Dongmo	Portugal	19.46 m
4	Jessica Schilder	Netherlands	19.06 m
5	Danniel Thomas-Dodd	Jamaica	19.04 m
6	Fanny Roos	Sweden	18.37 m

Women's 5 km Road Race
Place	Athlete	Country	Time
1st place, gold medalist(s)	Beatrice Chebet	Kenya	14:32
2nd place, silver medalist(s)	Margaret Kipkemboi	Kenya	14:32
3rd place, bronze medalist(s)	Gudaf Tsegay	Ethiopia	14:33
4	Ejgayehu Taye	Ethiopia	14:33
5	Sifan Hassan	Netherlands	14:38
6	Alicia Monson	United States	14:38
7	Hawi Feysa	Ethiopia	14:58
8	Amy-Eloise Markovc	Great Britain	15:29
9	Marta García	Spain	15:50
10	Rose Davies	Australia	16:08
	Viktória Wagner-Gyürkés	Hungary	DNF

Men's 100m (−0.3 m/s)
Place	Athlete	Country	Time
1st place, gold medalist(s)	Trayvon Bromell	United States	9.94
2nd place, silver medalist(s)	Yohan Blake	Jamaica	10.05
3rd place, bronze medalist(s)	Aaron Brown	Canada	10.06
4	Akani Simbine	South Africa	10.07
5	Yupun Abeykoon	Sri Lanka	10.14
6	Reece Prescod	Great Britain	10.16
7	Kyree King	United States	10.18
8	Andre De Grasse	Canada	10.21

Men's 200m (−0.6 m/s)
Place	Athlete	Country	Time
1st place, gold medalist(s)	Noah Lyles	United States	19.52
2nd place, silver medalist(s)	Aaron Brown	Canada	20.02
3rd place, bronze medalist(s)	Alexander Ogando	Dominican Republic	20.02
4	Erriyon Knighton	United States	20.20
5	Kenny Bednarek	United States	20.20
6	Andre De Grasse	Canada	20.43
7	Jereem Richards	Trinidad and Tobago	20.56
8	Fausto Desalu	Italy	20.79

Men's 400m
Place	Athlete	Country	Time
1st place, gold medalist(s)	Kirani James	Grenada	44.26
2nd place, silver medalist(s)	Bryce Deadmon	United States	44.47
3rd place, bronze medalist(s)	Vernon Norwood	United States	44.66
4	Zakithi Nene	South Africa	44.74
5	Ricky Petrucciani	Switzerland	45.31
6	Isaac Makwala	Botswana	45.56
7	Liemarvin Bonevacia	Netherlands	45.84

Men's 800m
Place	Athlete	Country	Time
1st place, gold medalist(s)	Emmanuel Korir	Kenya	1:43.26
2nd place, silver medalist(s)	Marco Arop	Canada	1:43.38
3rd place, bronze medalist(s)	Jake Wightman	Great Britain	1:44.10
4	Wyclife Kinyamal	Kenya	1:44.47
5	Bryce Hoppel	United States	1:44.77
6	Andreas Kramer	Sweden	1:44.94
7	Gabriel Tual	France	1:45.25
8	Benjamin Robert	France	1:48.11
	Patryk Sieradzki	Poland	DNF

Men's 1500m
Place	Athlete	Country	Time
1st place, gold medalist(s)	Jakob Ingebrigtsen	Norway	3:29.02
2nd place, silver medalist(s)	Timothy Cheruiyot	Kenya	3:30.27
3rd place, bronze medalist(s)	Ollie Hoare	Australia	3:30.59
4	Abel Kipsang	Kenya	3:31.36
5	Stewart McSweyn	Australia	3:31.45
6	Josh Kerr	Great Britain	3:31.85
7	Charles Grethen	Luxembourg	3:33.16
8	Abdelatif Sadiki	Morocco	3:34.12
9	Jake Heyward	Great Britain	3:34.27
10	Michał Rozmys	Poland	3:34.80
	Matthew Ramsden	Australia	DNF

Men's 110mH (−1.0 m/s)
Place	Athlete	Country	Time
1st place, gold medalist(s)	Grant Holloway	United States	13.02
2nd place, silver medalist(s)	Rasheed Broadbell	Jamaica	13.06
3rd place, bronze medalist(s)	Hansle Parchment	Jamaica	13.26
4	Asier Martínez	Spain	13.29
5	Trey Cunningham	United States	13.30
6	Jason Joseph	Switzerland	13.54
7	Damian Czykier	Poland	13.65
8	Just Kwaou-Mathey	France	13.73
9	Rafael Pereira	Brazil	13.73

Men's 400mH
Place	Athlete	Country	Time
1st place, gold medalist(s)	Alison dos Santos	Brazil	46.98
2nd place, silver medalist(s)	Khallifah Rosser	United States	47.76
3rd place, bronze medalist(s)	CJ Allen	United States	48.21
4	Wilfried Happio	France	48.72
5	Julien Watrin	Belgium	49.08
6	Yasmani Copello	Turkey	49.10
7	Julien Bonvin	Switzerland	49.63
8	Nick Smidt	Netherlands	51.82

Men's 3000mSC
Place	Athlete	Country	Time
1st place, gold medalist(s)	Soufiane El Bakkali	Morocco	8:07.67
2nd place, silver medalist(s)	Getnet Wale	Ethiopia	8:08.56
3rd place, bronze medalist(s)	Abraham Kibiwot	Kenya	8:08.61
4	Ryuji Miura	Japan	8:12.65
5	Leonard Bett	Kenya	8:13.21
6	Amos Serem	Kenya	8:15.64
7	Lawrence Kemboi	Kenya	8:17.98
8	Hailemariyam Amare	Ethiopia	8:24.49
	Wilberforce Chemiat Kones	Kenya	DNF
	Abderrafia Bouassel	Morocco	DNF

Men's Pole Vault
Place	Athlete	Country	Mark
1st place, gold medalist(s)	Armand Duplantis	Sweden	6.07 m
2nd place, silver medalist(s)	Sondre Guttormsen	Norway	5.86 m
3rd place, bronze medalist(s)	Chris Nilsen	United States	5.81 m
4	Renaud Lavillenie	France	5.81 m
5	Ben Broeders	Belgium	5.72 m
6	Thiago Braz	Brazil	5.72 m
7	Dominik Alberto	Switzerland	5.42 m

Men's Long Jump
Place	Athlete	Country	Mark
1st place, gold medalist(s)	Miltiadis Tentoglou	Greece	8.42 m (±0.0 m/s)
2nd place, silver medalist(s)	Marquis Dendy	United States	8.18 m (+0.5 m/s)
3rd place, bronze medalist(s)	Maykel Massó	Cuba	8.05 m (−0.9 m/s)
4	Thobias Montler	Sweden	8.01 m (+0.1 m/s)
5	Simon Ehammer	Switzerland	7.93 m (±0.0 m/s)
6	Emiliano Lasa	Uruguay	7.64 m (−0.2 m/s)

Men's Triple Jump
Place	Athlete	Country	Mark
1st place, gold medalist(s)	Andy Díaz	Cuba	17.70 m (−0.8 m/s)
2nd place, silver medalist(s)	Pedro Pichardo	Portugal	17.63 m (−0.4 m/s)
3rd place, bronze medalist(s)	Jordan Díaz	Cuba	17.60 m (−1.6 m/s)
4	Hugues Fabrice Zango	Burkina Faso	17.43 m (−0.1 m/s)
5	Almir dos Santos	Brazil	17.10 m (−1.1 m/s)
6	Lázaro Martínez	Cuba	16.75 m (−0.2 m/s)

Men's Discus Throw
Place	Athlete	Country	Mark
1st place, gold medalist(s)	Kristjan Čeh	Slovenia	67.10 m
2nd place, silver medalist(s)	Lukas Weißhaidinger	Austria	65.70 m
3rd place, bronze medalist(s)	Andrius Gudžius	Lithuania	65.28 m
4	Sam Mattis	United States	65.24 m
5	Daniel Ståhl	Sweden	65.16 m
6	Matthew Denny	Australia	64.81 m

Men's Javelin Throw
Place	Athlete	Country	Mark
1st place, gold medalist(s)	Neeraj Chopra	India	88.44 m
2nd place, silver medalist(s)	Jakub Vadlejch	Czech Republic	86.94 m
3rd place, bronze medalist(s)	Julian Weber	Germany	83.73 m
4	Curtis Thompson	United States	82.10 m
5	Patriks Gailums	Latvia	80.44 m
6	Leandro Ramos	Portugal	71.96 m

Women's 100m (−0.8 m/s)
Place	Athlete	Country	Time
1st place, gold medalist(s)	Shelly-Ann Fraser-Pryce	Jamaica	10.65
2nd place, silver medalist(s)	Shericka Jackson	Jamaica	10.81
3rd place, bronze medalist(s)	Marie-Josée Ta Lou	Ivory Coast	10.91
4	Daryll Neita	Great Britain	11.02
5	Aleia Hobbs	United States	11.03
6	Twanisha Terry	United States	11.10
7	Sha'Carri Richardson	United States	11.13
	Natasha Morrison	Jamaica	DQ

Women's 200m (−0.9 m/s)
Place	Athlete	Country	Time
1st place, gold medalist(s)	Shericka Jackson	Jamaica	21.80
2nd place, silver medalist(s)	Gabrielle Thomas	United States	22.38
3rd place, bronze medalist(s)	Tamara Clark	United States	22.42
4	Jenna Prandini	United States	22.45
5	Mujinga Kambundji	Switzerland	22.65
6	Tynia Gaither	Bahamas	22.66
7	Ida Karstoft	Denmark	22.80
8	Beth Dobbin	Great Britain	23.83

Women's 400m
Place	Athlete	Country	Time
1st place, gold medalist(s)	Marileidy Paulino	Dominican Republic	48.99
2nd place, silver medalist(s)	Fiordaliza Cofil	Dominican Republic	49.93
3rd place, bronze medalist(s)	Sada Williams	Barbados	49.98
4	Candice McLeod	Jamaica	50.03
5	Natalia Kaczmarek	Poland	50.74
6	Anna Kiełbasińska	Poland	50.93
7	Lieke Klaver	Netherlands	51.55
8	Stephenie Ann McPherson	Jamaica	52.32

Women's 800m
Place	Athlete	Country	Time
1st place, gold medalist(s)	Mary Moraa	Kenya	1:57.63
2nd place, silver medalist(s)	Natoya Goule	Jamaica	1:57.85
3rd place, bronze medalist(s)	Sage Hurta	United States	1:58.47
4	Halimah Nakaayi	Uganda	1:58.82
5	Keely Hodgkinson	Great Britain	1:59.06
6	Anita Horvat	Slovenia	1:59.25
7	Rénelle Lamote	France	1:59.38
8	Lore Hoffmann	Switzerland	1:59.69
9	Elena Bellò	Italy	2:00.24
	Olivia Baker	United States	DNF

Women's 1500m
Place	Athlete	Country	Time
1st place, gold medalist(s)	Faith Kipyegon	Kenya	4:00.44
2nd place, silver medalist(s)	Ciara Mageean	Ireland	4:01.68
3rd place, bronze medalist(s)	Freweyni Hailu	Ethiopia	4:01.73
4	Diribe Welteji	Ethiopia	4:01.79
5	Laura Muir	Great Britain	4:02.31
6	Gudaf Tsegay	Ethiopia	4:02.41
7	Heather MacLean	United States	4:02.90
8	Cory McGee	United States	4:04.63
9	Axumawit Embaye	Ethiopia	4:05.91
10	Hirut Meshesha	Ethiopia	4:06.28
	Allie Wilson	United States	DNF

Women's 100mH (−0.3 m/s)
Place	Athlete	Country	Time
1st place, gold medalist(s)	Tobi Amusan	Nigeria	12.29
2nd place, silver medalist(s)	Tia Jones	United States	12.40
3rd place, bronze medalist(s)	Britany Anderson	Jamaica	12.42
4	Jasmine Camacho-Quinn	Puerto Rico	12.49
5	Devynne Charlton	Bahamas	12.66
6	Nia Ali	United States	12.67
7	Pia Skrzyszowska	Poland	12.72
8	Kendra Harrison	United States	13.02
9	Ditaji Kambundji	Switzerland	13.22

Women's 400mH
Place	Athlete	Country	Time
1st place, gold medalist(s)	Femke Bol	Netherlands	53.03
2nd place, silver medalist(s)	Gianna Woodruff	Panama	53.72
3rd place, bronze medalist(s)	Janieve Russell	Jamaica	53.77
4	Dalilah Muhammad	United States	53.83
5	Rushell Clayton	Jamaica	54.25
6	Viktoriya Tkachuk	Ukraine	54.79
7	Anna Ryzhykova	Ukraine	55.06
8	Ayomide Folorunso	Italy	55.86

Women's 3000mSC
Place	Athlete	Country	Time
1st place, gold medalist(s)	Werkuha Getachew	Ethiopia	9:03.57
2nd place, silver medalist(s)	Winfred Yavi	Bahrain	9:04.47
3rd place, bronze medalist(s)	Faith Cherotich	Kenya	9:06.14
4	Zerfe Wondemagegn	Ethiopia	9:06.37
5	Jackline Chepkoech	Kenya	9:11.06
6	Sembo Almayew	Ethiopia	9:14.10
7	Emma Coburn	United States	9:20.00
8	Nataliya Strebkova	Ukraine	9:32.90
9	Chiara Scherrer	Switzerland	9:34.52
10	Daisy Jepkemei	Kazakhstan	9:47.50
	Virginia Nyambura Nganga	Kenya	DNF

Women's High Jump
Place	Athlete	Country	Mark
1st place, gold medalist(s)	Yaroslava Mahuchikh	Ukraine	2.03 m
2nd place, silver medalist(s)	Iryna Herashchenko	Ukraine	1.94 m
3rd place, bronze medalist(s)	Nicola Olyslagers	Australia	1.94 m
4	Nadezhda Dubovitskaya	Kazakhstan	1.91 m
5	Elena Vallortigara	Italy	1.91 m
6	Yuliya Levchenko	Ukraine	1.88 m

Women's Long Jump
Place	Athlete	Country	Mark
1st place, gold medalist(s)	Ivana Španović	Serbia	6.97 m (−0.7 m/s)
2nd place, silver medalist(s)	Khaddi Sagnia	Sweden	6.55 m (−0.5 m/s)
3rd place, bronze medalist(s)	Quanesha Burks	United States	6.54 m (−0.2 m/s)
4	Malaika Mihambo	Germany	6.52 m (−0.1 m/s)
5	Maryna Bekh-Romanchuk	Ukraine	6.50 m (−0.2 m/s)
6	Annik Kälin	Switzerland	6.50 m (−0.5 m/s)
7	Lorraine Ugen	Great Britain	6.38 m (+0.1 m/s)

Women's Triple Jump
Place	Athlete	Country	Mark
1st place, gold medalist(s)	Yulimar Rojas	Venezuela	15.28 m (−0.2 m/s)
2nd place, silver medalist(s)	Maryna Bekh-Romanchuk	Ukraine	14.96 m (+0.3 m/s)
3rd place, bronze medalist(s)	Shanieka Ricketts	Jamaica	14.85 m (+1.0 m/s)
4	Tori Franklin	United States	14.75 m (−0.4 m/s)
5	Thea LaFond	Dominica	14.56 m (+1.2 m/s)
6	Patrícia Mamona	Portugal	14.24 m (−0.5 m/s)

Women's Discus Throw
Place	Athlete	Country	Mark
1st place, gold medalist(s)	Valarie Allman	United States	67.77 m
2nd place, silver medalist(s)	Sandra Perković	Croatia	67.31 m
3rd place, bronze medalist(s)	Liliana Cá	Portugal	63.34 m
4	Kristin Pudenz	Germany	61.45 m
5	Claudine Vita	Germany	61.34 m
6	Laulauga Tausaga	United States	58.90 m

Women's Javelin Throw
Place	Athlete	Country	Mark
1st place, gold medalist(s)	Kara Winger	United States	64.98 m
2nd place, silver medalist(s)	Kelsey-Lee Barber	Australia	63.72 m
3rd place, bronze medalist(s)	Haruka Kitaguchi	Japan	63.56 m
4	Līna Mūze	Latvia	60.35 m
5	Barbora Špotáková	Czech Republic	59.08 m
6	Liveta Jasiūnaitė	Lithuania	57.73 m

=== National Events ===
Men's 400m
Place	Athlete	Country	Time
1st place, gold medalist(s)	Wayde van Niekerk	South Africa	44.39
2nd place, silver medalist(s)	Wilbert London	United States	44.78
3rd place, bronze medalist(s)	Lionel Spitz	Switzerland	45.53
4	Davide Re	Italy	45.59
5	Alex Haydock-Wilson	Great Britain	45.93
6	Ramsey Angela	Netherlands	46.41
7	Charles Devantay	Switzerland	46.53
8	Dany Brand	Switzerland	46.85

Women's 400m
Place	Athlete	Country	Time
1st place, gold medalist(s)	Amandine Brossier	France	51.21
2nd place, silver medalist(s)	Susanne Gogl-Walli	Austria	51.74
3rd place, bronze medalist(s)	Silke Lemmens	Switzerland	52.03
4	Annina Fahr	Switzerland	52.05
5	Eveline Saalberg	Netherlands	52.40
6	Lisanne de Witte	Netherlands	52.71
7	Julia Niederberger	Switzerland	52.86
8	Yasmin Giger	Switzerland	52.90

== See also ==
- 2022 Diamond League
