= Grant Holloway =

American track and field athlete (born 1997)

Grant Holloway OLY
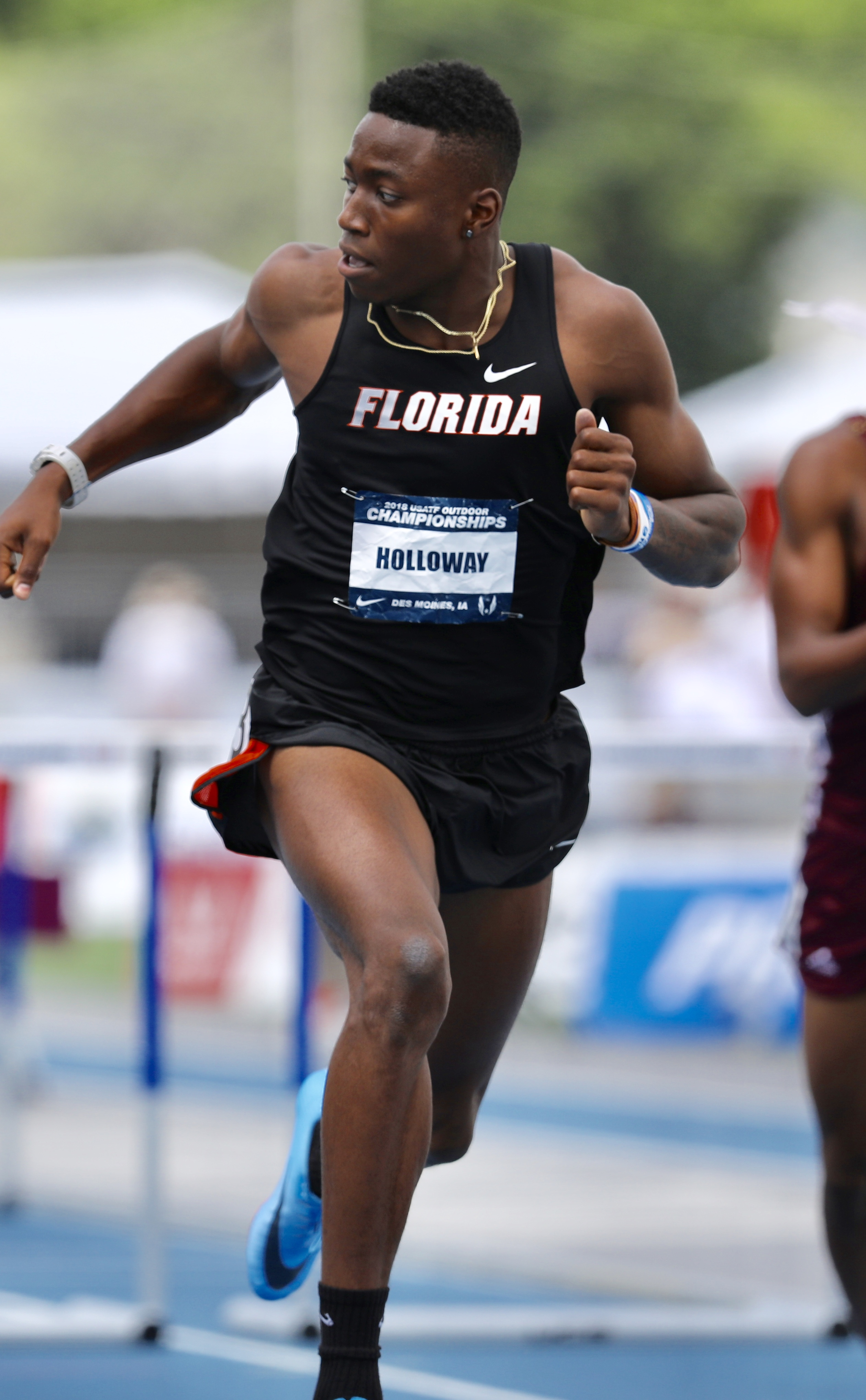
- Holloway at the 2018 U.S. Championships

Personal information
- Full name: Stanley Grant Holloway
- Nickname: The Flamingo (Note: The moniker is originally from fellow hurdler Omar McLeod, and has been used by organizations like The Athletic and NBC Sports.)
- Born: November 19, 1997 (age 29) Chesapeake, Virginia, U.S.
- Employer: Adidas
- Height: 6 ft 2 in (188 cm)
- Weight: 190 lb (86 kg)

Sport
- Country: United States
- Sport: Track and field
- Events: Hurdles; Sprints; Long jump
- College team: Florida Gators (2017–2019)
- Turned pro: June 2019
- Coached by: Mike Holloway (since 2016)

Achievements and titles
- Highest world ranking: 1st (110 m hurdles, 2023)
- Personal bests: 110 m hurdles: 12.81 (Eugene 2021); Indoors; 60 m hurdles: 7.27 WR (Albuquerque 2024); 60 m: 6.50 (Birmingham 2019)
Medal record
Men's athletics
Representing the United States
Olympic Games
Gold medal – first place	2024 Paris	110 m hurdles
Silver medal – second place	2020 Tokyo	110 m hurdles
World Championships
Gold medal – first place	2019 Doha	110 m hurdles
Gold medal – first place	2022 Eugene	110 m hurdles
Gold medal – first place	2023 Budapest	110 m hurdles
World Indoor Championships
Gold medal – first place	2022 Belgrade	60 m hurdles
Gold medal – first place	2024 Glasgow	60 m hurdles
Gold medal – first place	2025 Nanjing	60 m hurdles
Diamond League
First place	2022	110 m hurdles
World Indoor Tour
First place	2021	60 m hurdles
First place	2023	60 m hurdles

Stanley Grant Holloway (born November 19, 1997) is an American professional hurdler and sprinter. He is the 2024 Paris Olympic gold medalist in the 110 meters hurdles and the third-fastest man in history at the event with a personal best of 12.81 seconds.

Holloway is a three-time world champion (2019 Doha, 2022 Eugene, and 2023 Budapest) in the 110 m hurdles. In the 60 meters hurdles, Holloway is also a three-time world indoor champion (2022 Belgrade, 2024 Glasgow, and 2025 Nanjing) and the world indoor record holder with a time of 7.27 seconds. As of December 2025, he has not lost an indoor sprint hurdles race since March 2014, when he was 16 years old.

Despite his specialty being hurdling, Holloway showed incredible versatility whilst competing for the University of Florida, by also consistently competing in the 300 m, relays and long jump. His range was a driving force in Florida's strong team performances at the NCAA Championships. In the six NCAA Championships Holloway competed in between 2017 and 2018, Florida won three and finished second in the other three.

== Early life ==
Holloway was born November 19, 1997, in Chesapeake, Virginia, to mother Latasha and father Stan. Holloway was coached with his older brother Trey by their father Stan in track and field until high school as members of the Track 757 club. Holloway continued to compete in track and field with his brother at Grassfield High School for the Grizzlies, as well as competing on the football team as a wide receiver. He chose to compete for the University of Florida in the hurdles rather than the University of Georgia in football.

== Career ==
=== High School ===
==== 2013 ====
As a freshman, Holloway competed indoors for Grassfield High School as a hurdler and jumper, as well as running on relays. At the 2013 Virginia Indoor State Championship, Holloway finished fourth in the 55 meters hurdles with a time of 7.47 s, second in the high jump in 6' 7", and ran legs on the fourth placed 4 × 200 meters relay and fifth placed 4 × 400 meters relay.

Outdoors, Holloway amassed season bests of 14.42 s in the 110 m hurdles, 38.52 s in the 300 m hurdles, 6' 11" in the high jump, and 21' 3.75" in the long jump; he did not compete at the state or national meet.

==== 2014 ====
Holloway began to compete at national elite level as a hurdler in his sophomore year. Indoors, he won state championships in the 55 meters hurdles (7.54 s) and the high jump in 6' 10", whilst also finishing third in the 300 meters and fourth in the long jump in 22' 0.25". Holloway then competed at the New Balance Indoor Nationals; where he finished third in the Elite 200 m in a time of 21.93 s and second in the championship 60 meters hurdles in 7.93 s behind Isiah Moore. Notably, Holloway won every 55 meters / 60 meters hurdles race he ran that year except for the aforementioned 60 m hurdles final (as well as the semifinal) at the national meet. After those losses to Moore, Holloway began an ongoing undefeated streak in the 55 m and 60 m hurdles indoors.

Outdoors, Holloway won state championships in the 110 meters hurdles (14.11 s) and high jump (7' 1'), finished third in the 300 meters hurdles, seventh in the 200 meters in 22.13 s, and ninth in the long jump in 20' 5.5".

==== 2015 ====
Holloway entered more short and long sprints while continuing both jumps as a junior. He repeated as state champion in the 55 meter hurdles (7.19 s) and added the long jump title (23' 6.25"), finished second in the high jump in 6' 10", and finished second behind Noah Lyles in the 300 meters (34.41 s) and third behind Lyles and brother Josephus Lyles in the 55 meters (6.35 s). At the New Balance Indoor Nationals, he won the Championship 60 meter hurdles in a photo finish over Chad Zallow in 7.59 s, the then all-time #2 mark, and finished second in the Championship high jump in 6' 11".50.

Outdoors, Holloway amassed four state championships: he repeated in the 110 meter hurdles (13.61 s) and high jump (6' 8"), and added the 300 meter hurdles (36.73) and long jump (25' 8.75"), and also finished fifth in the 200 meters in 21.65 s. At the New Balance Outdoor Nationals, Holloway false started in the Championship 110 meter hurdles final and finished fifth in the long jump with a 23' 10" mark. At the US Junior Championships, Holloway made the semi-finals of the 110 meter hurdles and finished third in the long jump with 24' 8.75".

==== 2016 ====
Indoors, Holloway won three state championships: a third consecutive 55 meter hurdle title in 7.14 s, his second consecutive long jump title, and the 500 meters title, which he won by a hundredth of a second in 1:03.35 over Josephus Lyles; Holloway also finished 3rd in the 55 meters behind the Lyles brothers for the second year in a row. At the New Balance Indoor Nationals, Holloway competed in his first career pentathlon and set the 3rd best HS mark ever at the time (4230 points); he also won a second consecutive national title and set the national record in the 60 meter hurdles (7.53).

Outdoors, Holloway won three state championships: a third consecutive 110 meter hurdles title, a third consecutive high jump title (6' 6"), and repeated in the long jump (25' 5.75"); he also finished second in the 200 meter in 21.32 s and was disqualified in the 300 meters hurdles. At the New Balance Outdoor Nationals, Holloway finished third in the Championship 110 m hurdles final in 13.51 s. At the US Junior Championships, Holloway finished sixth in the long jump in 24' 10.75" and third in the 110 m hurdles in 13.37 s.

Holloway ended his high school career with sixteen state championships (seven indoors, nine outdoor) and three indoor national championships.

=== Collegiate ===
==== 2017 ====
At the University of Florida, Holloway continued to show incredible range by competing in the long jump and the 4 × 400 m relay, in addition to his hurdles specialty. He went undefeated in the 60 m hurdles, and won the NCAA Indoor Title in a collegiate-leading 7.58 seconds. He also finished 11th in the long jump and ran the second leg on Florida's 4 × 400 m relay team that finished 2nd. Outdoors, he won the 110 m hurdles, finished 2nd in the long jump and anchored Florida's 4 × 400 m relay team to 4th place. He also ran the third leg on their 4 × 100 m team throughout the season. Holloway competed in the US Championships, finishing fourth in the 110 m hurdles in 13.39 s.

==== 2018 ====
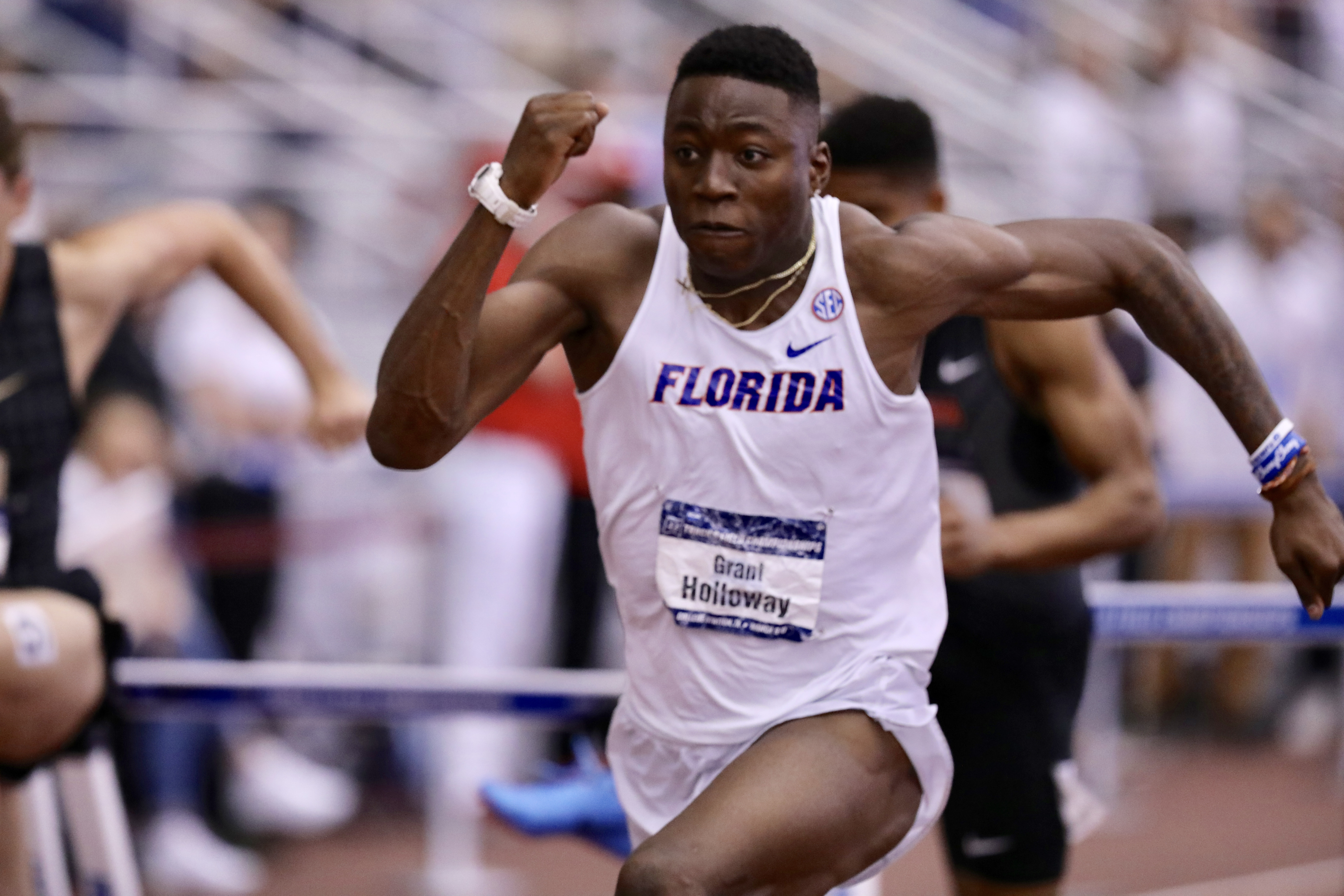
Holloway competing at the 2018 NCAA Division I Indoor Track and Field Championships.

Prior to setting the NCAA and American record in the 60 m hurdles, in February he set the NCAA record with a 7.42 s clocking at the Clemson Tiger Paw Invitational, beating and taking the record away from Olympic champion in the 110 m hurdles Omar McLeod. On 10 March, he defended NCAA title in 7.42 seconds, equalling his collegiate record. This year, he finished second in the long jump and Florida finished third in the 4 × 400 m relay with his help on the second leg. Later that year he clocked 13.15 s in the 110 m hurdles at the Southeastern Conference (SEC) Championships, winning the meet in the second fastest time in NCAA history. At the NCAA Division I Outdoor Championships, Holloway retained his 100 m hurdles, running 13.42 s to narrowly beat David Kendziera by 0.01 s. He also finished 9th in the long jump, ran the 2nd leg on the 4 × 100 m team that finished third, and anchored Florida to fourth place in the 4 × 400 m. He once again went to the US Championships, this time finishing 2nd by thousandths of a second.

==== 2019: World and NCAA champion ====
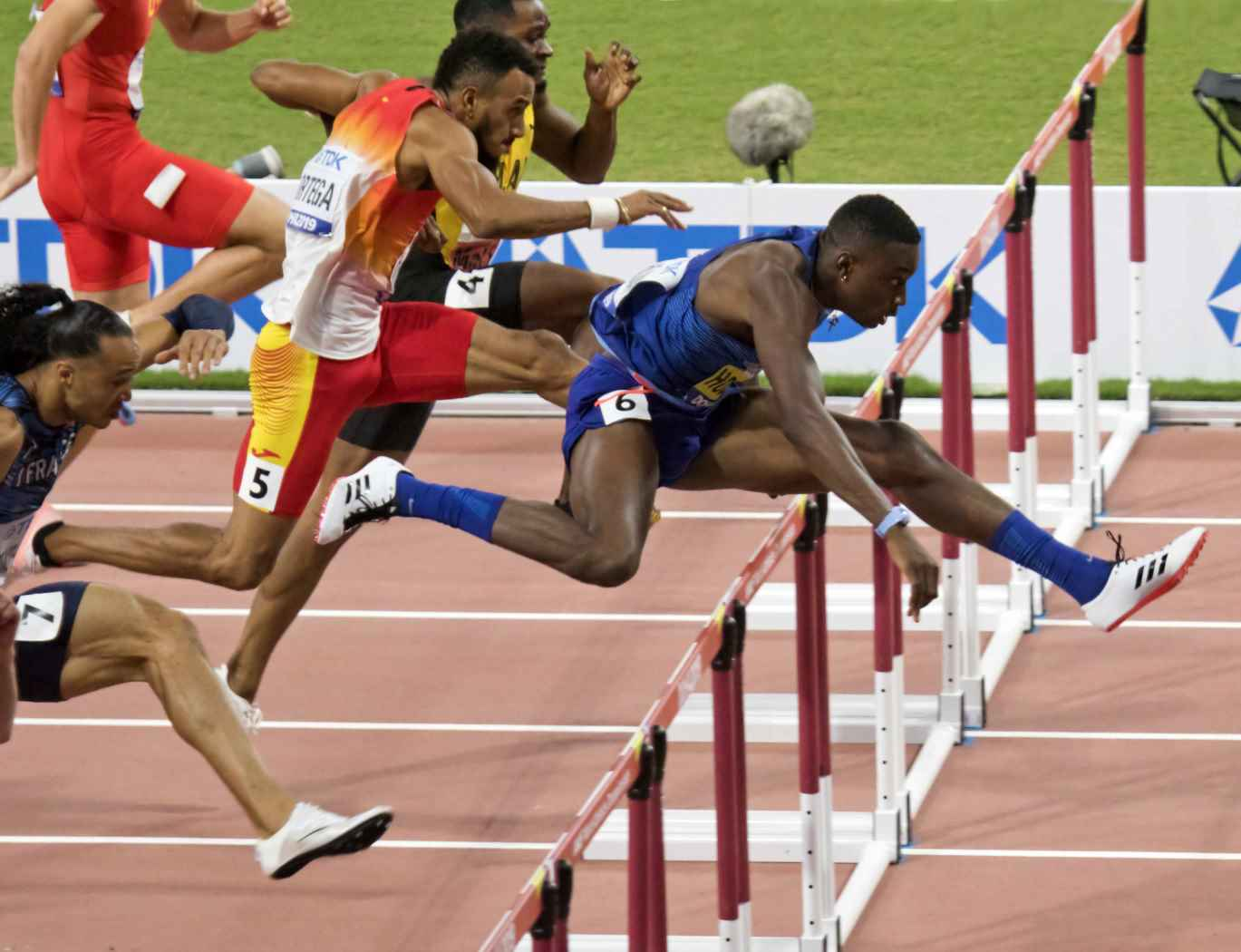
Holloway (R) en route to the 110 m hurdles title at the 2019 World Athletics Championships in Doha, Qatar.

On 9 March, despite finding strong challenge from Daniel Roberts, he went unbeaten in the 60 m hurdles throughout the indoor season and won his 3rd consecutive NCAA title in the event, becoming the first to do so. He also smashed his own collegiate record with 7.35 seconds, also an American record.

At the NCAA Division I Championships, Holloway retained his 110 mH title, his time of 12.98 s broke the 40-year old NCAA record held by Renaldo Nehemiah. He also helped his team to win the 4 × 100 m relay, and finish second in the 4 × 400 m relay.

Holloway won the 110 m hurdles at the Gyulai Istvan Memorial on July 9, in a time of 13.16 s, his first race on the European circuit. At the US Championships, he finished second behind Roberts, running a time of 13.38 s. At the World Championships in Doha, he won gold in the 110 m hurdles, running a time of 13.10 s to beat Sergey Shubenkov into second.

=== Professional ===
==== 2021: Olympic silver ====
Holloway set the 60 m hurdles world record on February 24, 2021, at the conclusion of the World Athletics Indoor Tour in Madrid, beating Colin Jackson's 27-year-old world record of 7.30 s by one hundredth of a second. Holloway had previously matched his American record of 7.32 s in the heats, already the #2 all-time performance going into the meet, before winning the final in 7.29 s. His victory in the final also made him the overall winner of the 2021 World Indoor Tour in the 60 m hurdles.

He made his outdoor pro debut at the Miramar Invitational on April 10, winning the 110 m hurdles final in a wind-assisted (+2.2 m/s) 13.04 s, his fastest opening performance in the event. On June 26, at the US Olympic trials, he set a new personal best of 12.81 s in the semi-finals of the 110 m hurdles, the second fastest time in history and only 0.01 s behind Aries Merritt's world record of 12.80 s. He went onto win the final in 12.96 s.

At the 2020 Olympics in Tokyo, Holloway won silver in the 110 m hurdles, finishing behind Hansle Parchment in 13.09 s.

==== 2022: World indoor and outdoor titles ====
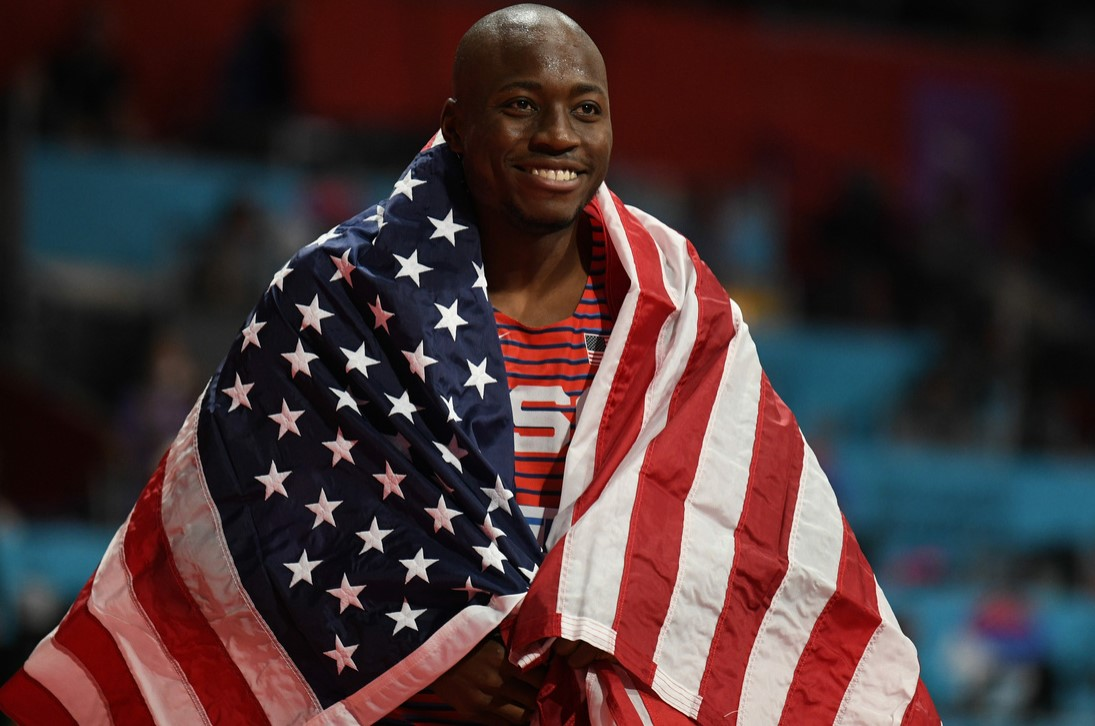
Holloway after his win at the 2022 World Indoor Championships.

At the World Indoor Championships in Belgrade, Holloway won gold in the 60 m hurdles in 7.39 s. He had previously equalled his world record of 7.29 s in the semi-finals.

On 17 July, at the World Championships in Eugene, he won gold in the 110 m hurdles, running a time of 13.03 s.

"When I won the title in Zurich in 2022, I think that was when I turned around my whole career. I was really good before that, but on that day I took out a crazy good field and I was like: this is what good hurdling looks like. I think I just really flipped the script on myself."

— Holloway on the 2022 Diamond League Final

Holloway picked up his first career Diamond League win on August 10, winning in Monaco with a new seasons best of 12.99 s. On September 4, he won at the ISTAF Berlin meet, in 13.05 s. At the Diamond League Final in Zurich on 26 August, he won his first Diamond League title, in 13.02 s.

==== 2023: Second world outdoor title ====
On 4 February, Holloway won over 60 mH at the New Balance Indoor Grand Prix, running a time of 7.38 s. At the Meeting Hauts-de-France Pas-de-Calais on 15 February, he picked up another win, running 7.39 s. On 25 February, at the Birmingham Indoor Grand Prix, he won the 60 m hurdles in a world lead of 7.35 s.

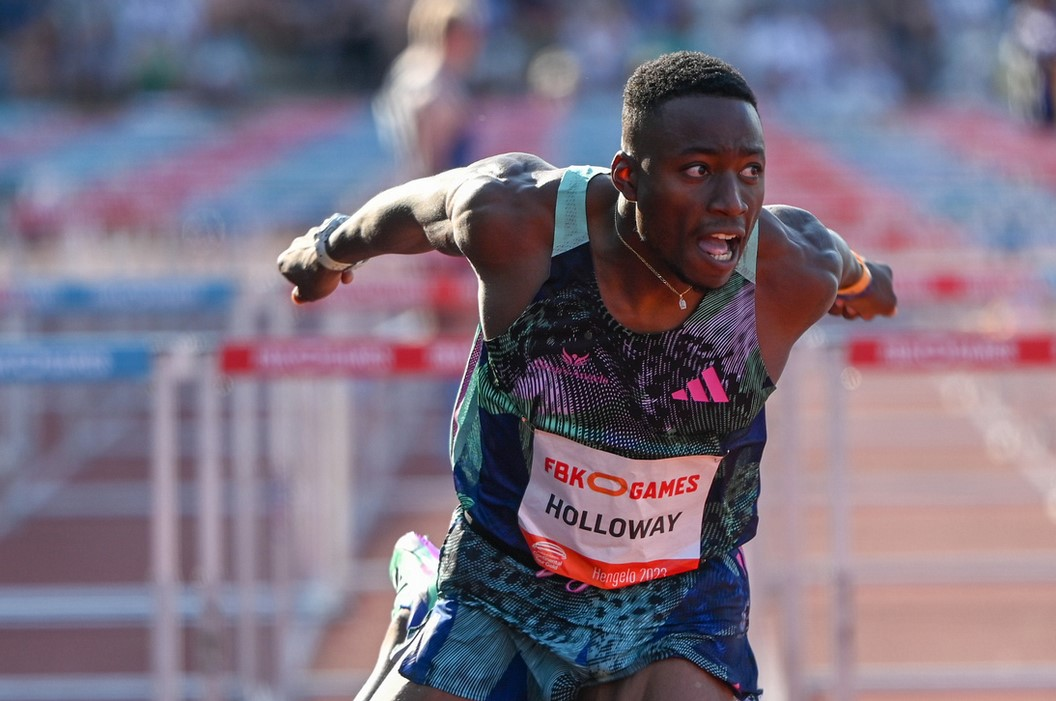
Holloway at the 2023 FBK Games.

Holloway won at the Atlanta City Games on 6 May, running a time of 13.01 s. On 4 June, he won at the FBK Games, in a meeting record of 13.03 s. At the Paris Diamond League, he won the 110 m hurdles in a new world lead of 12.98 s. He won at the London Diamond League on 23 July, running 13.01 s, holding off Shunsuke Izumiya by 0.05 s.

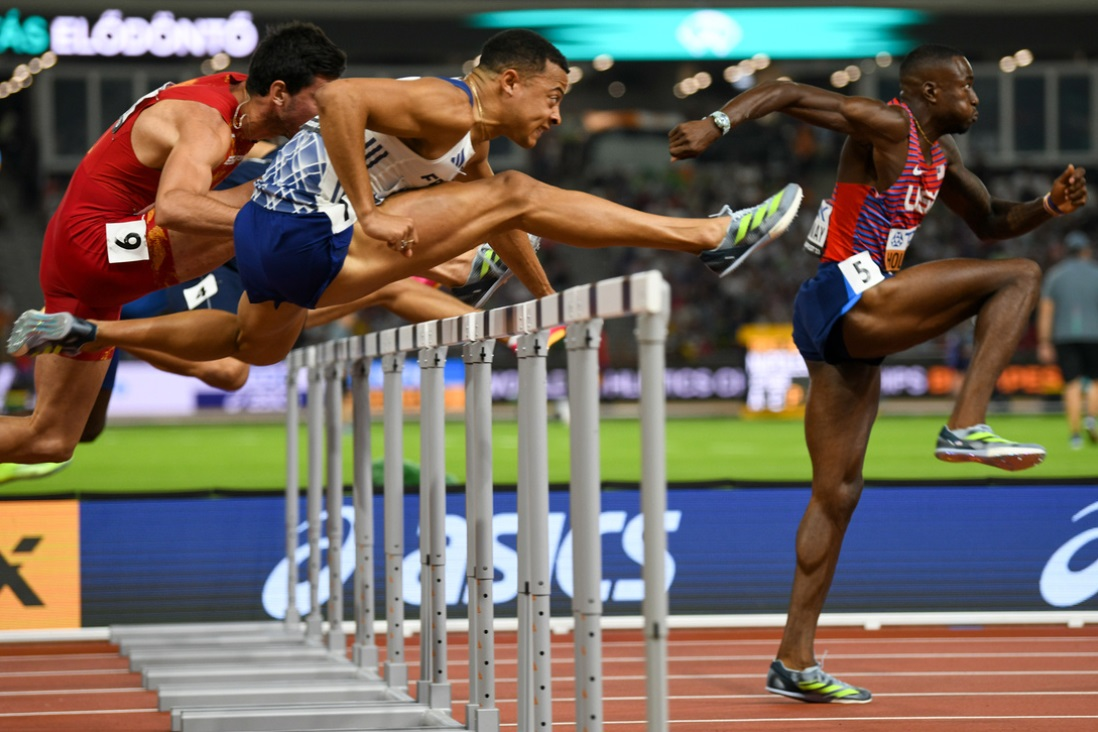
Holloway competing in the semi-finals of the 110 m hurdles at the 2023 World Championships.

At the World Championships in Budapest, he gold in a time of 12.96 s, he became the second man to win three consecutive 110 m hurdles titles after Greg Foster. On 17 September, at the Eugene Diamond League, he finished second behind Hansle Parchment.

=== 2024: Olympic champion ===
On 10 February, Holloway won over 60 m hurdles at the Meeting Hauts-de-France Pas-de-Calais in Liévin, running a world leading time of 7.32 s in the final. At the US Indoor Championships, he bettered his own world record in the heats, running 7.27 s. He did not contest the final as a result of being the reigning champion. On 2 March, at the World Indoor Championships in Glasgow, he won gold, running an equal championship record time of 7.29 s, the second fastest time in history.

At the U.S. Olympic trials, Holloway placed first in 12.86 s, his second fastest time ever. The race marked the first time three men had gone under the 13-second barrier in one race. On 12 July, Holloway won at the Monaco Diamond League, running 13.01 s.

"It means the world. To complete the career grand slam is what I’ve been wanting. I’m beside myself right now. I'm so happy about everything going on. I knew I was in shape, I knew I was capable of completing this feat. I’ve been hurdling so well this year, I’m in great shape, I just want to keep this going. I’m looking forward to what’s to come. The future is so bright."

— Holloway following his win at the Paris Olympics.

At the Summer Olympics in Paris, Holloway won gold in the 110 m m hurdles final in 12.99 s.

On 22 August, in his first post-Olympic race, Holloway finished second behind Rasheed Broadbell at the Lausanne Diamond League, running a time of 13.14 s behind Broadbell's 13.10 s. At the Silesia Diamond League on 25 August, he returned to winning ways, running 13.04 s. Holloway won the Zurich Diamond League on 5 September with a time of 12.99 s.

=== 2025: World indoor champion ===
At the World Indoor Championships in Nanjing, Holloway won his fourth consecutive title in the 60 m hurdles, running a time of 7.42 s.

On 19 April, in his first outdoor race of the season, he finished second at the Tom Jones Memorial, running 13.18 s to finish behind Trey Cunningham, who ran 13.09 s. Holloway competed at the Xiamen Diamond League on 26 April, finishing tenth in the 110 m hurdles in 13.72 s. At the Paris Diamond League on 20 June, he finished fifth in 13.11 s. On 16 August, he finished second behind Cordell Tinch at the Silesia Diamond League, running a time of 13.15 s.

At the World Championships in Tokyo, Holloway was a shock exit in the semi-finals as he finished sixth and didn't qualify for the final.

=== 2026: Injury ===
After a strain injury in January, Holloway tore his hamstring in March. This resulted in him not being able to compete for the rest of the 2026 season.

== Awards and recognition ==
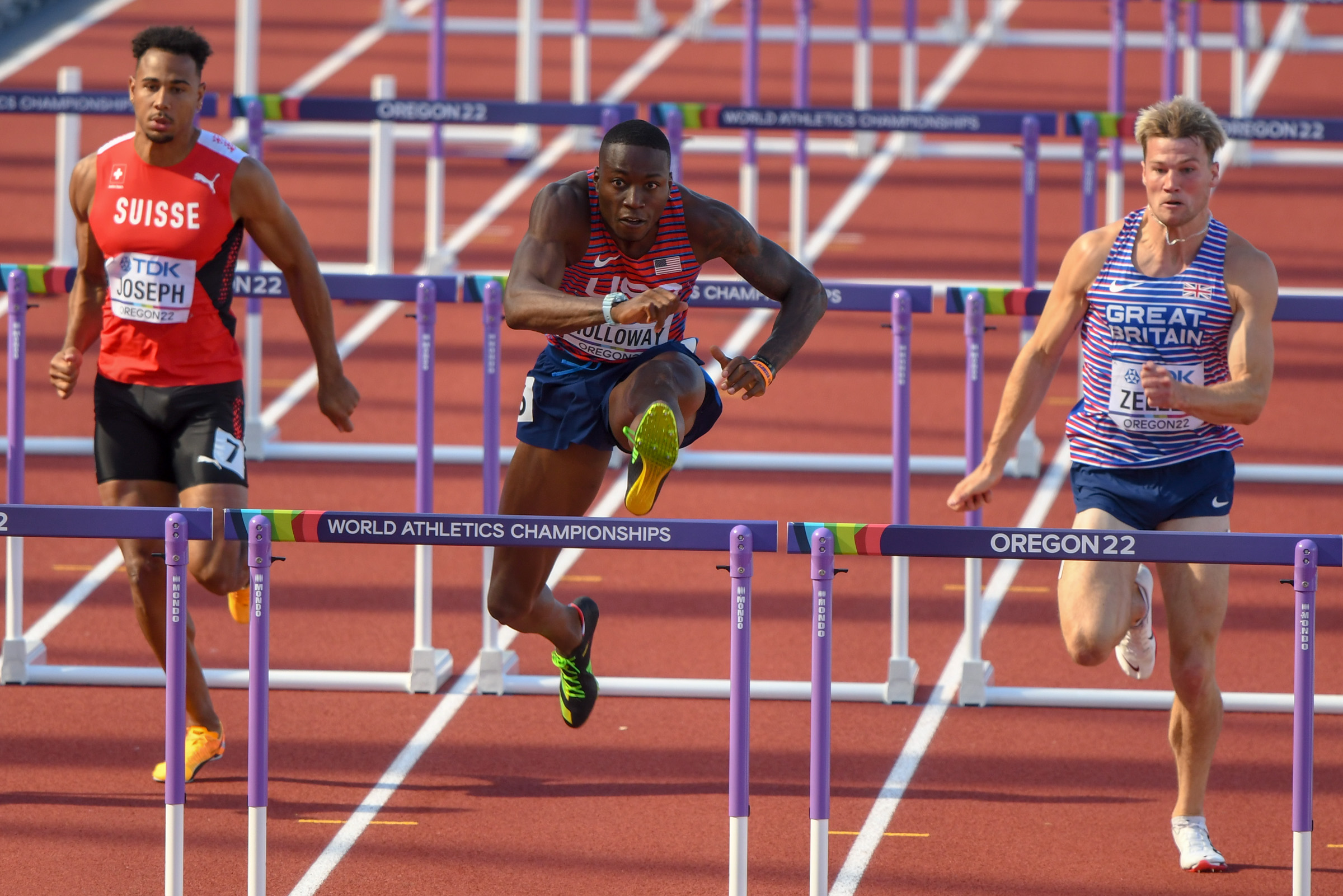
Grant Holloway (C) races in the 110 m hurdles semifinal 1 at the 2022 World Athletics Championships in Eugene, Oregon.

Holloway was one of three men's finalists in 2018 for The Bowerman—an annual American collegiate track and field award—and was the fan favorite by vote. The United States Track & Field and Cross Country Coaches Association (USTFCCCA) awarded him The Bowerman in 2019, and additionally named him both the Men's Indoor Track Athlete of the Year and the Men's Outdoor Track Athlete of the Year. Track & Field News awarded him both the U.S. Collegiate Men's Indoor Athlete Of The Year and the U.S. Collegiate Men's Outdoor Athlete Of The Year titles in 2019.

After setting the world record in the 60 m hurdles and having an undefeated indoor season in which he won the 2021 World Indoor Tour title, Holloway was runner-up for the Indoor Men's Athlete Of The Year title by Track & Field News.

In 2024, Holloway was named Jesse Owens Male Athlete of the Year in Night of Legends Award.

== Statistics ==
Information from World Athletics profile unless otherwise noted.

=== Personal bests ===
Sprints and hurdles
Event	Time (m):s	Wind (m/s)	Venue	Date	Notes
60 meters indoor	6.50	—N/a	Birmingham	March 9, 2019	
60 m hurdles indoor	7.27	—N/a	Albuquerque	February 16, 2024	World record
100 meters	10.21	0.0	Gainesville	April 16, 2022	
110 m hurdles	12.81	+1.8	Eugene	June 26, 2021	#3 all-time
4 × 400 m relay split	43.75	—N/a	Austin	June 7, 2019	Anchor
4 × 100 m relay	37.97	—N/a	Austin	June 7, 2019	Collegiate record (Note: Shared with Raymond Ekevwo, Abdul Hakim Sani Brown, and Ryan Clark for the Florida Gators. Holloway was the third carrier, after Sani Brown and before Clark.)
4 × 400 m relay	2:59.60	—N/a	Austin	June 7, 2019	
4 × 400 m relay indoor	3:01.43	—N/a	College Station	March 10, 2018	#3 all-time (Note: Shared with Kunle Fasasi, Chantz Sawyers, and Benjamin Lobo Vedel for the Florida Gators. Holloway was the second carrier, after Fasasi and before Sawyers.)

Jumps
Event	Mark	Wind (m/s)	Venue	Date	Notes
Long jump	8.17 m (26 ft 9 1/2 in)	+0.6	Knoxville	May 12, 2018	
Long jump	8.32 m (27 ft 3 1/2 in) w	+2.9	Knoxville	May 12, 2018	Wind-assisted
High jump	2.16 m (7 ft 1 in)	—N/a	Newport News	June 6, 2014	

=== International championship results ===
Representing the United States
Year	Championship	Position	Event	Time	Wind (m/s)	Venue
2019	World Championships	1st	110 m hurdles	13.10	+0.6	Doha, Qatar
2021	Olympic Games	2nd	110 m hurdles	13.09	-0.5	Tokyo, Japan
2022	World Indoor Championships	1st	60 m hurdles	7.39	—N/a	Belgrade, Serbia
2022	World Championships	1st	110 m hurdles	13.03	+1.2	Eugene, OR, United States
2023	World Championships	1st	110 m hurdles	12.96	0.0	Budapest, Hungary
2024	World Indoor Championships	1st	60 m hurdles	7.29	—N/a	Glasgow, United Kingdom
2024	Olympic Games	1st	110 m hurdles	12.99	_	Paris, France
2025	World Indoor Championships	1st	60 m hurdles	7.42	—N/a	Nanjing, China
2025	World Championships	18th (sf)	110 m hurdles	13.52	-0.1	Tokyo, Japan

=== Circuit wins ===
- Diamond League 110 m hurdles champion: 2022
  - 2022 (2): Monaco, Zürich
  - 2023 (3): Florence, Paris, London
  - 2024 (4): Eugene, Monaco, Silesia, Zürich
- World Indoor Tour Gold 60 m hurdles overall winner: 2021
  - 2021 (3): Liévin, Toruń, Madrid
  - 2022 (3): New York City, Liévin, Birmingham
  - 2023 (3): Boston, Liévin, Birmingham
  - 2024 (2): Boston, Liévin
  - 2025 (2): Boston, Liévin

=== National championship results ===
- PB = personal best
- SB = seasonal best
- WL = world lead, fastest time in the world in a calendar year
- CR = collegiate record
- NR = national (American) record

Representing the Grassfield High Grizzlies (2015–2016), Florida Gators (2017–2019), and adidas (2019–2021)
Year	Championship	Position	Event	Time or mark	Wind (m/s)	Venue	Notes
2015	U.S. Junior Championships	6th (semis)	110 m hurdles	13.75	+1.7	Eugene, Oregon	Q (Note: Qualified for the final but did not start (DNS).)
2015	U.S. Junior Championships	3rd	Long jump	7.54 m (24 ft 8 3/4 in) w	+2.8	Eugene, Oregon	Wind-assisted
2016	U.S. Junior Championships	3rd	110 m hurdles	13.37	+1.6	Clovis, California	PB
2016	U.S. Junior Championships	6th	Long jump	7.59 m (24 ft 10 3/4 in)	+1.9	Clovis, California	SB
2017	NCAA Division I Indoor Championships	11th	Long jump	7.57 m (24 ft 10 in)	—N/a	College Station, Texas	
2017	NCAA Division I Indoor Championships	1st	60 m hurdles	7.58	—N/a	College Station, Texas	PB
2017	NCAA Division I Indoor Championships	2nd	4 × 400 m relay	3:03.52	—N/a	College Station, Texas	
2017	NCAA Division I Championships	2nd	Long jump	8.00 m (26 ft 2 3/4 in)	−0.5	Eugene, Oregon	
2017	NCAA Division I Championships	11th	4 × 100 m relay	39.07	—N/a	Eugene, Oregon	
2017	NCAA Division I Championships	1st	110 m hurdles	13.49	−2.0	Eugene, Oregon	
2017	NCAA Division I Championships	4th	4 × 400 m relay	3:02.16	—N/a	Eugene, Oregon	43.89 s anchor split
2017	U.S. Championships	4th	110 m hurdles	13.39	−0.7	Sacramento, California	PB
2018	NCAA Division I Indoor Championships	2nd	Long jump	8.13 m (26 ft 8 in)	—N/a	College Station, Texas	PB
2018	NCAA Division I Indoor Championships	1st	60 m hurdles	7.47	—N/a	College Station, Texas	
2018	NCAA Division I Indoor Championships	3rd	4 × 400 m relay	3:01.43	—N/a	College Station, Texas	#3 all-time
2018	NCAA Division I Championships	9th	Long jump	7.83 m (25 ft 8 1/4 in)	+0.1	Eugene, Oregon	
2018	NCAA Division I Championships	1st	110 m hurdles	13.42	−1.1	Eugene, Oregon	
2018	NCAA Division I Championships	3rd	4 × 100 m relay	38.89	—N/a	Eugene, Oregon	
2018	NCAA Division I Championships	4th	4 × 400 m relay	3:01.83	—N/a	Eugene, Oregon	
2018	U.S. Championships	2nd	110 m hurdles	13.46	−1.8	Des Moines, Iowa	13.454 s (Note: Devon Allen also finished with a (rounded-up) time of 13.46 s, but placed first ahead of Holloway because Allen finished in 13.452 s to Holloway's 13.454 s.)
2019	NCAA Division I Indoor Championships	3rd	Long jump	7.95 m (26 ft 3/4 in)	—N/a	Birmingham, Alabama	
2019	NCAA Division I Indoor Championships	1st	60 m hurdles	7.35	—N/a	Birmingham, Alabama	WL, CR, NR, #3 all-time
2019	NCAA Division I Indoor Championships	1st	60 m	6.50	—N/a	Birmingham, Alabama	PB
2019	NCAA Division I Indoor Championships	3rd	4 × 400 m relay	3:05.24	—N/a	Birmingham, Alabama	
2019	NCAA Division I Championships	12th	Long jump	7.72 m (25 ft 3 3/4 in)	+1.3	Austin, Texas	
2019	NCAA Division I Championships	1st	4 × 100 m relay	37.97	—N/a	Austin, Texas	WL, CR
2019	NCAA Division I Championships	1st	110 m hurdles	12.98	+0.8	Austin, Texas	WL, CR, PB
2019	NCAA Division I Championships	2nd	4 × 400 m relay	2:59.60	—N/a	Austin, Texas	43.75 s anchor split
2019	U.S. Championships	2nd	110 m hurdles	13.36	−0.8	Des Moines, Iowa	
2021	U.S. Olympic Trials	1st	110 m hurdles	12.96	+0.4	Eugene, Oregon	
2022	U.S. Indoor Championships	1st	60 m hurdles	7.37	—N/a	Spokane, Washington	=MR
2022	U.S. Championships	—	110 m hurdles	DNS	+1.2	Eugene, Oregon	
2024	U.S. Olympic Trials	1st	110 m hurdles	12.86	+2.0	Eugene, Oregon	WL

- NCAA results from Track & Field Results Reporting System.

=== Seasonal bests ===
All information from World Athletics profile.

Year	60 m hurdles	110 m hurdles	Long jump	High jump
2012	8.32 s	14.96 s	—	—
2013	8.14 s	14.49 s	6.70 m (21 ft 11 3/4 in)	2.11 m (6 ft 11 in)
2014	7.93 s	14.11 s	6.81 m (22 ft 4 in)	2.16 m (7 ft 1 in)
2015	7.59 s	13.75 s	7.84 m (25 ft 8 1/2 in)	2.13 m (6 ft 11 3/4 in)
2016	7.53 s	13.37 s	7.59 m (24 ft 10 3/4 in)	—
2017	7.58 s	13.39 s	8.05 m (26 ft 4 3/4 in)	—
2018	7.42 s	13.15 s	8.17 m (26 ft 9 1/2 in)	—
2019	7.35 s	12.98 s	8.02 m (26 ft 3 1/2 in)	—
2020	7.38 s	13.19 s	—	—
2021	7.29 s	12.81 s	—	—
2022	7.29 s	12.99 s	—	—
2023	7.35 s	12.96 s	—	—
2024	7.27 s	12.86 s	—	—
2025	7.36 s	13.11 s	—	—

== Notes ==
Records
Preceded by (United Kingdom) Colin Jackson	Men's 60 m hurdles world record holder February 24, 2021 – present	Incumbent
Preceded by (Cuba) Dayron Robles	Men's 60 m hurdles North American and Pan American record holder February 9, 2021 – present	Incumbent
Preceded by Greg Foster, Allen Johnson, and Terrence Trammell	Men's 60 m hurdles American record holder March 9, 2019 – present	Incumbent

Achievements
Preceded by (Russia) Sergey Shubenkov	Men's 110 m hurdles season's best 2019	Succeeded by (Spain) Orlando Ortega
Preceded by (United Kingdom) Andrew Pozzi	Men's 60 m hurdles season's best 2018 – present	Incumbent
