= Meeting Hauts-de-France Pas-de-Calais =

Annual indoor track and field competition

Meeting Pas de Calais
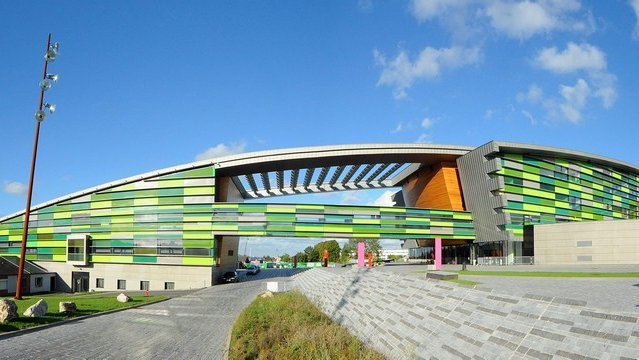
- The host stadium – Stade Couvert Régional Liévin
- Date: February
- Location: Liévin, France
- Event type: Indoor track and field
- Established: 1988
- Website: Meeting Pas de Calais
- 2026 Meeting Hauts-de-France Pas-de-Calais

The Meeting Hauts-de-France Pas-de-Calais (formerly Meeting Pas de Calais) also called Meeting International de Liévin (International Meeting of Liévin) is an annual indoor track and field competition which takes place in February at Arena Stade Couvert in Liévin, France. It is one of the events of the World Athletics Indoor Tour organised by World Athletics.

== History ==
The first meeting was held in 1988, two years after the construction of the Arena Stade Couvert de Liévin to host the 1987 European Athletics Indoor Championships.

From 1988 onwards, the meeting was held every year until and including 2006, skipping 2007-2008 and then being held from 2009 to 2012. Due to technical problems and work delays, the 2013, 2014, 2015, 2016, and 2017 editions were cancelled. In 2018, the meeting was held again as an EA Indoor Permit Meeting. From 2020 onwards the meeting was one of the events of the World Athletics Indoor Tour.

In the early 1990s, it had the name "Memorial Raymond Dubois". In 1993, it changed its name to "St Yorre du Pas-de-Calais". Until 1998, it was listed in the competition calendar as "Meeting Vittel du Pas-de-Calais". From 1999 to 2006, it was known as "Meeting Gaz de France du Pas-de-Calais".

=== Editions ===
Meeting Hauts-de-France Pas-de-Calais editions
Ed.	Name	Date	Ref.
1st	1988 Meeting Pas-de-Calais	14 Feb 1988	
2nd	1989 Memorial Raymond Dubois	28 Jan 1989	
3rd	1990 Memorial Raymond Dubois	27 Jan 1990	
4th	1991 Memorial Raymond Dubois	26 Jan 1991	
5th	1992 St Yorre du Pas-de-Calais	25 Jan 1992	
6th	1993 St Yorre du Pas-de-Calais	13 Feb 1993	
7th	1994 Meeting Vittel du Pas-de-Calais	13 Feb 1994	
8th	1995 Meeting Vittel du Pas-de-Calais	19 Feb 1995	
9th	1996 Meeting Vittel du Pas-de-Calais	18 Feb 1996	
10th	1997 Meeting Vittel du Pas-de-Calais	16 Feb 1997	
11th	1998 Meeting Vittel du Pas-de-Calais	22 Feb 1998	
12th	1999 Meeting Gaz de France du Pas-de-Calais	21 Feb 1999	
13th	2000 Meeting Gaz de France du Pas-de-Calais	13 Feb 2000	
14th	2001 Meeting Gaz de France du Pas-de-Calais	25 Feb 2001	
15th	2002 Meeting Gaz de France du Pas-de-Calais	24 Feb 2002	
16th	2003 Meeting Gaz de France du Pas-de-Calais	23 Feb 2003	
17th	2004 Meeting Gaz de France du Pas-de-Calais	28 Feb 2004	
18th	2005 Meeting Gaz de France du Pas-de-Calais	26 Feb 2005	
19th	2006 Meeting Gaz de France du Pas-de-Calais	2 Mar 2006	
20th	2009 Meeting du Pas-de-Calais	10 Feb 2009	
21st	2010 Meeting du Pas-de-Calais	5 Mar 2010	
22nd	2011 Meeting du Pas-de-Calais	8 Feb 2011	
23rd	2012 Meeting du Pas-de-Calais	14 Feb 2012	
24th	2018 Meeting Hauts-de-France Pas-de-Calais	13 Feb 2018	
25th	2019 Meeting Hauts-de-France Pas-de-Calais	10 Feb 2019	
26th	2020 Meeting Hauts-de-France Pas-de-Calais	19 Feb 2020	
27th	2021 Meeting Hauts-de-France Pas-de-Calais	9 Feb 2021	
28th	2022 Meeting Hauts-de-France Pas-de-Calais	17 Feb 2022	
29th	2023 Meeting Hauts-de-France Pas-de-Calais	15 Feb 2023	
30th	2024 Meeting Hauts-de-France Pas-de-Calais	10 Feb 2024	
31st	2025 Meeting Hauts-de-France Pas-de-Calais	13 Feb 2025	
32nd	2026 Meeting Hauts-de-France Pas-de-Calais	19 Feb 2026	

== World records ==
Over the course of its history, numerous world records have been set at the Meeting Pas de Calais.

World records set at the Meeting Hauts-de-France Pas-de-Calais
Year	Event	Record	Athlete	Nationality
1993	200 m	21.87	Merlene Ottey	Jamaica
1993	Pole vault	6.14 m	Sergey Bubka	Ukraine
1994	Triple jump	14.90 m	Inna Lasovskaya	Russia
1995	200 m	20.25	Linford Christie	United Kingdom
1996	200 m	19.92	Frankie Fredericks	Namibia
2002	Pole vault	4.74 m	Svetlana Feofanova	Russia
2005	Pole vault	4.89 m	Yelena Isinbayeva	Russia
2021	1500 m	3:53.09	Gudaf Tsegay	Ethiopia
2022	1500 m	3:30.60	Jakob Ingebrigtsen	Norway
2023	3000 m	7:23.81	Lamecha Girma	Ethiopia
2025	1500 m	3:29.63+	Jakob Ingebrigtsen	Norway
2025	Mile	3:45.14	Jakob Ingebrigtsen	Norway
2026	800 m	1:54.87	Keely Hodgkinson	Great Britain

== Meeting records ==
=== Men ===
Men's meeting records of the Meeting Hauts-de-France Pas-de-Calais
Event	Record	Athlete	Nationality	Date	Meet	Ref.
60 m	6.44	Ronnie Baker	United States	19 February 2020		
200 m	19.92	Frankie Fredericks	Namibia	18 February 1996		
300 m	32.38	Greg Nixon	United States	10 February 2009		
400 m	45.51	Karsten Warholm	Norway	15 February 2023	2023	
800 m	1:43.91	Eliott Crestan	Belgium	19 February 2026	2026	
1000 m	2:17.06	Mehdi Baala	France	28 February 2004		
1500 m	3:29.63+	Jakob Ingebrigtsen	Norway	13 February 2025	2025	
Mile	3:45.14	Jakob Ingebrigtsen	Norway	13 February 2025	2025	
2000 m	4:51.23	Lamecha Girma	Ethiopia	10 February 2024	2024	
3000 m	7:23.81	Lamecha Girma	Ethiopia	15 February 2023	2023	
Two miles	8:06.61	Hicham El Guerrouj	Morocco	23 February 2003		
50 m hurdles	6.30+	Grant Holloway	United States	13 February 2025	2025	
60 m hurdles	7.32	Grant Holloway	United States	9 February 2021		
60 m hurdles	7.32	Grant Holloway	United States	10 February 2024	2024	
High jump	2.38 m	Javier Sotomayor	Cuba	19 February 1995		
High jump	2.38 m	Javier Sotomayor	Cuba	18 February 1996		
Pole vault	6.14 m	Sergey Bubka	Ukraine	13 February 1993		
Long jump	8.60 m	Ivan Pedroso	Cuba	16 February 1997		
Triple jump	17.82 m	Hugues Fabrice Zango	Burkina Faso	9 February 2021		
Shot put	22.37 m	Leonardo Fabbri	Italy	10 February 2024	2024	
5000 m walk	18:28.50	Frantz Kostiukevich	Belarus	13 February 1993		

=== Women ===
Women's meeting records of the Meeting Hauts-de-France Pas-de-Calais
Event	Record	Athlete	Nationality	Date	Meet	Ref.
60 m	6.93	Irina Privalova	Russia	13 February 1994		
200 m	21.87	Merlene Ottey	Jamaica	13 February 1993		
300 m	35.69	Patricia Hall	Jamaica	14 February 2012		
400 m	49.63	Femke Bol	Netherlands	10 February 2024	2024	
800 m	1:54.87	Keely Hodgkinson	Great Britain	19 February 2026	2026	
1000 m	2:34.61	Maria Mutola	Mozambique	23 February 2003		
1500 m	3:53.09	Gudaf Tsegay	Ethiopia	9 February 2021		
Mile	4:21.72	Gudaf Tsegay	Ethiopia	17 February 2022		
2000 m	5:30.31	Salomé Afonso	Portugal	19 February 2026	2026	
3000 m	8:17.11	Gudaf Tsegay	Ethiopia	10 February 2024	2024	
60 m hurdles	7.75	Ackera Nugent	Jamaica	13 February 2025	2025	
2000 m steeplechase	5:45.09	Winfred Yavi	Bahrain	9 February 2021		
High jump	2.02 m	Stefka Kostadinova	Bulgaria	25 January 1992		
Pole vault	4.89 m	Yelena Isinbayeva	Russia	26 February 2005		
Long jump	7.09 m	Heike Drechsler	Germany	19 February 1995		
Triple jump	14.90 m (Note: by World Athletics source; 14.94 m by official meeting website, a typo)	Inna Lasovskaya	Russia	13 February 1994		
Shot put	19.18 m	Auriol Dongmo Mekemnang	Portugal	9 February 2021		
