= Lamecha Girma =

Ethiopian athlete (born 2000)

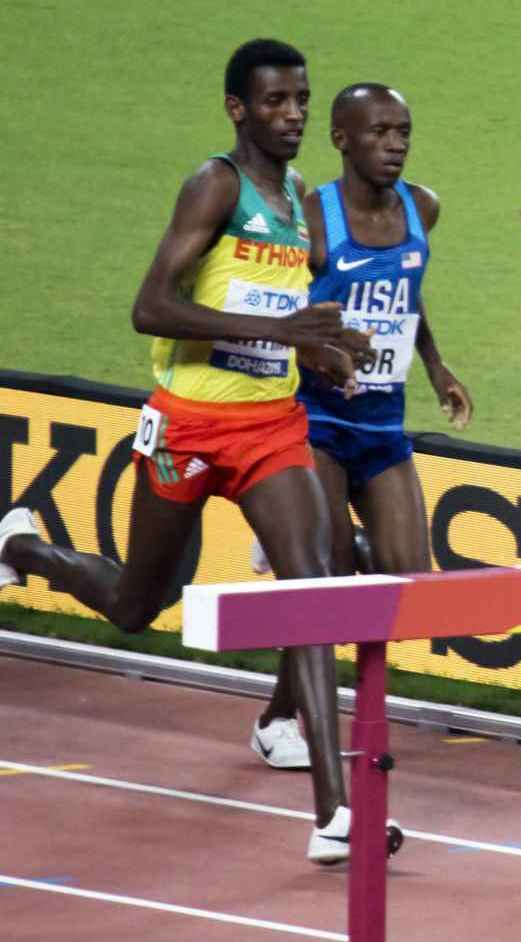
- Girma competing at the 2019 World Athletics Championships in Doha

Personal information
- Born: 26 November 2000 (age 25) Asella, Oromia, Ethiopia
- Height: 6 ft 2 in (188 cm)

Sport
- Country: Ethiopia
- Sport: Athletics
- Event: 3000 m steeplechase
- Coached by: Fikedu Girma (2021–); Teshome Kebede (2018–2021); Kefyalew Alemu (–2018)

Achievements and titles
- Personal bests: 3000 m st.: 7:52.11 WR (Paris 2023); Indoors; 3000 m: 7:23.81 AR (Liévin 2023)
Medal record
Men's athletics
Representing Ethiopia
Olympic Games
Silver medal – second place	2020 Tokyo	3000 m st.
World Championships
Silver medal – second place	2019 Doha	3000 m st.
Silver medal – second place	2022 Eugene	3000 m st.
Silver medal – second place	2023 Budapest	3000 m st.
World Indoor Championships
Silver medal – second place	2022 Belgrade	3000 m
African U20 Championships
Bronze medal – third place	2019 Abidjan	3000 m st.

Lamecha Girma (born 26 November 2000) is an Ethiopian middle- and long-distance runner who holds the world record in the 3,000 metres steeplechase. He is the 2020 Tokyo Olympic silver medallist in the steeplechase and won silver medals at the 2019, 2022 and 2023 World Athletics Championships. Girma is also the former world record holder for the indoor 3,000 metres and won the silver medal at that distance at the 2022 World Indoor Championships. He is the Ethiopian national record holder for the 1500m.

== Career ==
=== Early career ===
At age 18, Lamecha Girma earned the junior bronze medal in the 3,000 m steeplechase at the 2019 African Under-20 Championships. The same year, he set an Ethiopian national record in his specialist event during the World Athletics Championships in Doha with a time of 8:01.36. He finished second behind Olympic and world champion from Kenya Conseslus Kipruto who ran 8:01.35; Morocco's Soufiane El Bakkali came in third in 8:03.76.

=== Breakthrough and Olympic silver medal ===
At the delayed 2020 Tokyo Olympics in 2021, Lamecha won the silver medal with a 8:10.38 clocking. This time El Bakkali finished first in 8:08.90 while third-placed Benjamin Kigen achieved 8:11.45.

Girma became 2022 World Indoor Championship silver medallist at the 3,000 metres in Belgrade. He ran 7:41.63 while his compatriot Selemon Barega clocked 7:41.38 for gold, and Marc Scott was third in 7:42.02. A few months later in July, at the World Championships held in Eugene, Oregon, Girma had to settle for silver once again in his signature event, finishing behind El Bakkali who ran 8:25.13 and ahead of Kipruto in third in 8:27.92.

=== World indoor and outdoor records ===
On 15 February 2023, he smashed the 25-year-old world indoor 3,000 m record at the 2023 Meeting Hauts-de-France Pas-de-Calais in Liévin with a time of 7:23.81, slicing 1.09 seconds off the previous mark held by Daniel Komen since 1998. Girma's record has since been broken by Grant Fisher, who ran 7:22.91 in 2025.

On 9 June 2023, Girma broke the world 3,000 m steeplechase record at the Meeting de Paris of the Diamond League with a time of 7:52:11, which was 1.52 seconds faster than the 19-year-old previous world record of 7:53.63 set by Saif Saaeed Shaheen. He was clearly in the lead with two laps to go before speeding up around the final lap, which he ran in about 64 seconds, to cross the finish line with the new fastest time. After the race, he expressed his happiness and stated that he had planned to beat the world record that night.

=== Paris Olympics ===
At the 2024 Paris Olympics, on 7 August, Girma was among the favorites to win gold in the 3000 m steeplechase final, along with Moroccan Soufiane El Bakkali. However, in the bell lap, on the back straightaway jump, Girma suffered a fall that knocked him unconscious. Girma was carried off the track in a stretcher, and was hospitalized for treatment. His coach indicated shortly after the race that the injury was not life-threatening, but that Girma would need some time to recover.

== Personal life and family ==
Born in Bekoji to countryside farmers, Lamecha lives in Sululta with several of his family members. He has seven brothers and two sisters. Two of his brothers, Diriba Girma and Kuma Girma, are professional runners – his oldest brother Fikadu Girma serves as their coach. By virtue of his steeplechase performance, he was selected to join the Tirunesh Academy starting in 2017. Following the 2019 World Athletics Championships, Girma moved to Addis Ababa and had to learn Amharic for the first time, only having known Oromo language up to this point. He trains in a group of five, including himself and his two running brothers.

=== Kuma Girma ===
Kuma Girma (born 24 November 2005) is a middle- and long-distance runner who is Lamecha's youngest running brother. After placing 3rd at the Ethiopian U20 Championships 3000 m in 2022, he was a member of the silver medal-winning Ethiopian team at the 2023 World Cross Country Championships U20 race, finishing 13th individually. He followed that up by placing 3rd in Jakob Ingebrigtsen's two-mile world record race at the 2023 Meeting de Paris in a time of 8:10.34. He set his 5000 m personal best of 13:03.37 at the 2023 Athletissima to finish 7th.

=== Diriba Girma ===
Diriba Girma (born 29 January 2003) has focused primarily on middle-distance running and is the middle sibling of the family. After finishing 4th at the 2021 Ethiopian Athletics Championships and 11th at the national 1500 m Olympic trials, he did not qualify for the Ethiopian team at the 2021 Games. Diriba ran his 3000 m personal best of 7:38.79 at the 2022 Meeting Hauts-de-France Pas-de-Calais. That time made him the top seed heading in to the 3000 m at the 2022 World U20 Championships, at which he finished 4th in the finals.

== Achievements ==
=== Personal bests ===
- 1,500 metres – 3:29.51 (Lausanne 2023) NR
  - 1,500 metres indoor – 3:35.60 (Val-de-Reuil 2021)
- 2,000 metres – 4:57.87 (Bydgoszcz 2020)
- 3,000 metres – 7:26.18 (Doha 2023)
  - 3,000 metres indoor – 7:23.81 (Liévin 2023) Area record
- 3,000 metres steeplechase – 7:52.11 (Paris 2023) World record

=== International competitions ===
Representing Ethiopia
Year	Competition	Venue	Position	Event	Time
2019	African U20 Championships	Abidjan, Ivory Coast	3rd	3000 m s'chase	8:48.56
2019	World Championships	Doha, Qatar	2nd	3000 m s'chase	8:01.36 NR
2021	Olympic Games	Tokyo, Japan	2nd	3000 m s'chase	8:10.38
2022	World Indoor Championships	Belgrade, Serbia	2nd	3000 m i	7:41.63
2022	World Championships	Eugene, OR, United States	2nd	3000 m s'chase	8:26.01
2023	World Championships	Budapest, Hungary	2nd	3000 m s'chase	8:05.44
2024	Olympic Games	Paris, France	18th (h)	3000 m s'chase	8:23.89^{1}

^{1}Did not finish in the final

=== Circuit wins ===
- Diamond League

3000 metres steeplechase wins, other events specified in parentheses

- 2021: Monaco Herculis
- 2022: Rome Golden Gala
- 2023: Doha Diamond League (3000 m, WL MR)
- 2023: Paris Diamond League WR WL MR NR DLR
