= Collins Kipruto =

Kenyan middle-distance runner (born 1994)

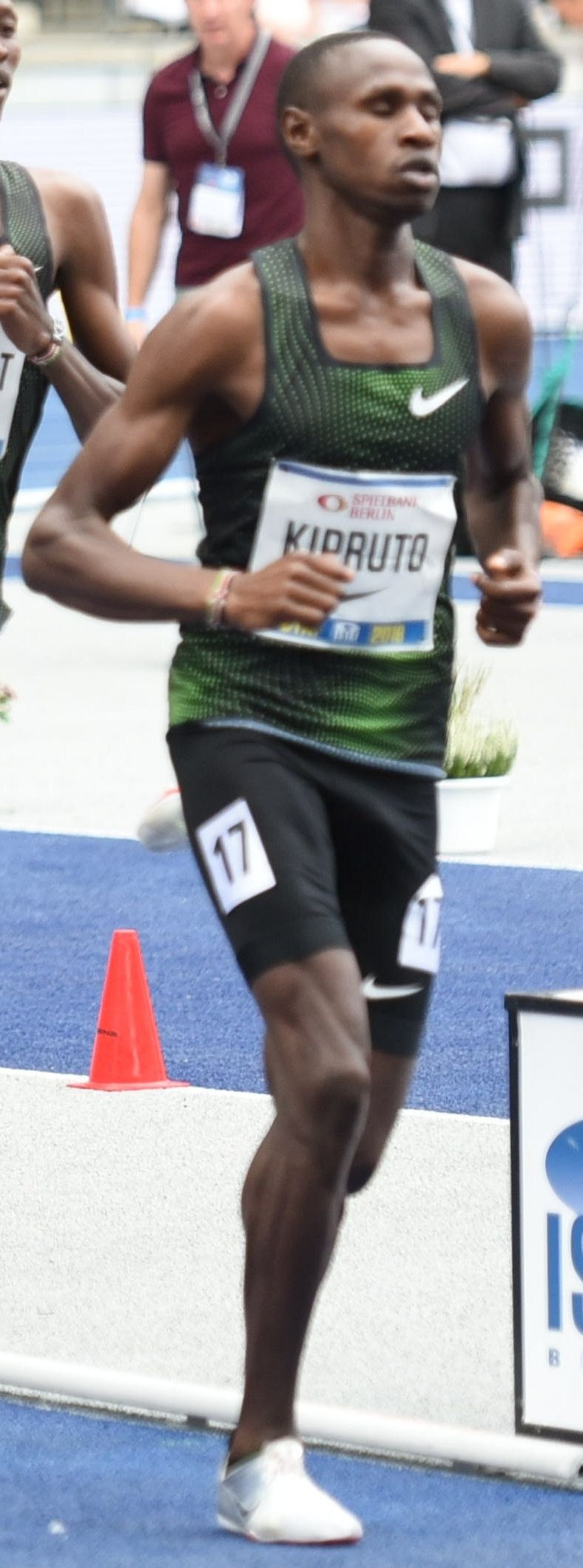
- Kipruto pacing the 2019 ISTAF Berlin 1500 m

Personal information
- Nationality: Kenya
- Born: 12 April 1994 (32 years, 93 days old)
- Home town: Nyahururu, Kenya
- Agent: Marc Corstjens

Sport
- Sport: Athletics
- Event: 800 metres

Achievements and titles
- National finals: 2023 Kenyan Champs; • 800m, 7th
- Personal bests: 800m: 1:43.95 (2021); 800m sh: 1:45.39 (2022)
- Updated on 1 January 2024

Collins Kipruto (born 12 April 1994) is a Kenyan middle-distance runner specializing in the 800 metres. He was the overall winner of the 2020 World Athletics Indoor Tour in the 800 m.

== Biography ==
Collins is from Nyahururu, Kenya where he is a Kenya Wildlife Service officer in addition to his athletics career.

At the 2019 Penn Relays, Kipruto anchored the winning Kenyan sprint medley relay team with a 1:47.16 split. This performance led to him qualifying for the 2019 IAAF World Relays, where he competed in the new mixed 2 × 2 × 400 m relay with women's teammate Eglay Nafuna Nalyanya. The team finished 4th across the line, but was later disqualified due to Nalyanya accidentally stepping inside the track.

Kipruto was a regular on the 2020 World Athletics Indoor Tour series, which concluded in February 2020. By virtue of winning the 800 m at the Copernicus Cup, Meeting Hauts-de-France Pas-de-Calais, and the Villa de Madrid Indoor Meeting, Kipruto was the overall Tour winner in the 800 m category.

In March 2021, Kipruto criticised Kenyan president Uhuru Kenyatta's COVID-19 policies requiring athletes to train alone, saying that they would negatively affect his preparations for international competitions.

At the February 2022 Meeting de l’Eure, Kipruto held off Noah Kibet to win the 800 m in a meeting record of 1:47.05. With the 2022 World Athletics Indoor Championships qualifying standard achieved, Kipruto was targeting a podium finish, stating that he knew a win would not be easy considering the competition such as American athlete Craig Engels. At the World Indoor Championships, Kipruto finished fourth in his heat and did not qualify for the finals.

== Statistics ==
=== Personal bests ===
Event	Mark	Place	Competition	Venue	Date	Ref
800 metres	1:43.95	1st place, gold medalist(s)	Meeting Pro Athlé Tour de Marseille	Marseille, France	9 June 2021	
800 metres (short track)	1:45.39	1st place, gold medalist(s)	Birmingham Indoor Grand Prix	Birmingham, United Kingdom	19 February 2022	
