= Khalid Benmahdi =

Algerian middle-distance runner

Khaled Benmahdi
Personal information
- Born: 22 October 1988 (age 37) Batna "Algeria "

Sport
- Sport: Track and field
- Event: 800 metres
Medal record
Winner 800m French Championship open 2023
- Updated on 29 August 2015

Khaled Benmahdi (born 22 October 1988) is a male Algerian middle-distance runner competing primarily in the 800 metres. He represented his country at the 2015 World Championships in Beijing.

His personal bests in the event are 1:46.06 outdoors (Oordegem-Lede 2015) and 1:47.89 indoor (Reims 2019).

== Competition record ==
Year	Competition	Venue	Position	Event	Notes
Representing Algeria
2015	World Championships	Beijing, China	40th (h)	800 m	1:49.61
