= Zerfe Wondemagegn =

Ethiopian athlete

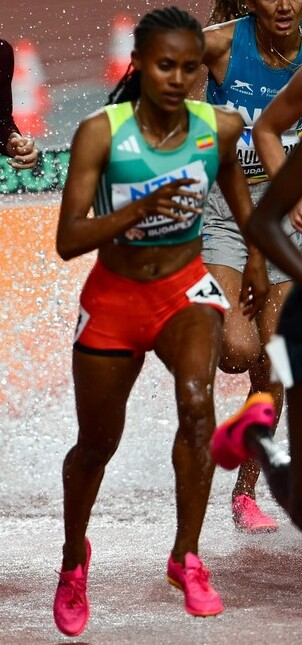
- Zerfe Wondemagegn in 2023

Personal information
- Nationality: Ethiopian
- Born: 26 October 2002 (age 23)

Sport
- Sport: Athletics
- Event: Steeplechase

Zerfe Wondemagegn (born 26 October 2002) is an Ethiopian athlete. She competed in the women's 3000 metres steeplechase event at the 2019 World Athletics Championships. She competed in the women's 3000 metres steeplechase event at the 2020 Summer Olympics.

In April 2024 Wondemagegn was issued with a five-year competition ban backdated to October 2023 due to an anti-doping rule violation sanction after testing positive for testosterone and EPO. Wondemagegn also had her results from August 22, 2023, disqualified.
