= Patryk Sieradzki =

Polish runner

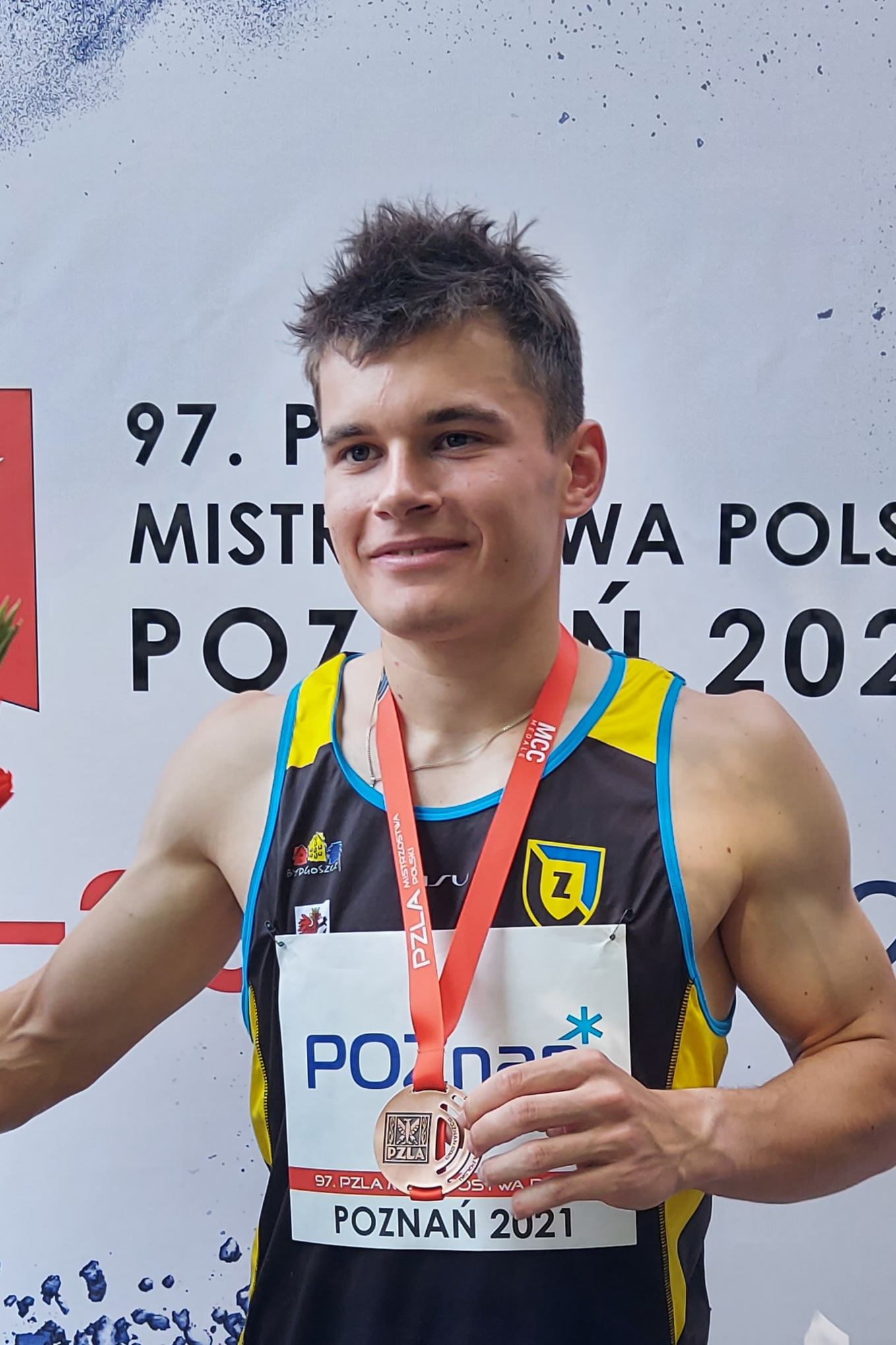
- Sieradzki in 2021

Personal information
- Born: 6 October 1998 (age 27)

Sport
- Sport: Athletics
- Event: 800 metres
- Club: Zawisza Bydgoszcz

Achievements and titles
- Personal best: 800 m: 1:44.16 (Budapest 2025)

Patryk Sieradzki (born 6 October 1998) is a Polish middle-distance runner specialising in the 800 metres.

Sieradzki is coached by Bartosz Sobowiec. He began as a pacemaker – in 2021, he only finished 5 out of 22 races he started. But at the 2022 Irena Szewińska Memorial, he ran fast enough to qualify for the 2022 World Athletics Championships.
