= Javier Ramírez =

Javier Ramírez may refer to:

- Javier Ramírez (cyclist)
- Javier Ramírez (entertainer)
- Javier Ramírez Sinués, Spanish politician and official
