= 2021 European Athletics Indoor Championships – Men's 60 metres hurdles =

The men's 60 metres hurdles event at the 2021 European Athletics Indoor Championships was held on 6 March 2021 at 13:05 (heats) and on 7 March 2021 13:05 (semi-finals), at 17:00 (final) local time.

== Medalists ==
Gold	Silver	Bronze
Wilhem Belocian; France	Andrew Pozzi; Great Britain	Paolo Dal Molin; Italy

== Records ==
Standing records prior to the 2021 European Athletics Indoor Championships
World record	Grant Holloway (USA)	7.29	Gallur, Spain	24 February 2021
European record	Colin Jackson (GBR)	7.30	Sindelfingen, Germany	6 March 1994
Championship record	Colin Jackson (GBR)	7.39	Paris, France	12 March 1994
World Leading	Grant Holloway (USA)	7.29	Gallur, Spain	24 February 2021
European Leading	Wilhem Belocian (FRA)	7.45	Metz, France	6 February 2021

== Results ==
=== Heats ===
Qualification: First 4 in each heat (Q) and the next fastest 4 (q) advance to the semifinals.

Rank	Heat	Athlete	Nationality	Time	Note
1	1	Andrew Pozzi	Great Britain	7.52	Q
2	4	Wilhem Belocian	France	7.52	Q
3	3	Damian Czykier	Poland	7.57	Q, SB
4	5	Paolo Dal Molin	Italy	7.59	Q
5	2	Aurel Manga	France	7.64	Q
6	3	Asier Martínez	Spain	7.67	Q
7	5	Balázs Baji	Hungary	7.70	Q
8	4	Enrique Llopis	Spain	7.70	Q
9	1	Elmo Lakka	Finland	7.70	Q
10	2	Erik Balnuweit	Germany	7.71	Q
11	4	Krzysztof Kiljan	Poland	7.73	Q
12	3	Mikdat Sevler	Turkey	7.78	Q
13	1	Vladimir Vukicevic	Norway	7.78	Q
14	2	Keiso Pedriks	Estonia	7.79	Q
15	2	Koen Smet	Netherlands	7.80	Q
16	5	Max Hrelja	Sweden	7.81	Q
17	2	Hassane Fofana	Italy	7.81	q
18	4	Franck Brice Koua	Italy	7.82	Q
19	1	Brahian Peña	Switzerland	7.82	Q, SB
20	4	Milan Trajkovic	Cyprus	7.83	q
21	5	Artur Noga	Poland	7.84	Q
22	3	Stanislav Stankov	Bulgaria	7.85	Q
23	3	Andreas Martinsen	Denmark	7.85	q
24	2	Bohdan Chornomaz	Ukraine	7.86	q, SB
25	5	Finley Gaio	Switzerland	7.86	
26	1	Vitali Parakhonka	Belarus	7.87	
27	5	Ilari Manninen	Finland	7.90	
28	4	Rapolas Saulius	Lithuania	7.90	
29	4	Cosmin Ilie Dumitrache	Romania	7.91	
30	5	Luka Trgovčević	Serbia	7.91	
31	2	Furkan Aktaş	Turkey	7.94	
32	1	Bálint Szeles	Hungary	7.97	
33	1	Luis Salort	Spain	7.97	
34	3	Viktor Solyanov	Ukraine	7.99	
35	3	Alin Ionut Anton	Romania	8.19	

=== Semifinals ===
Qualification: First 2 in each heat (Q) and the next 2 fastest (q) advance to the Final.

Rank	Heat	Athlete	Nationality	Time	Note
1	2	Wilhem Belocian	France	7.49	Q
2	1	Andrew Pozzi	Great Britain	7.53	Q
3	3	Damian Czykier	Poland	7.59	Q
4	1	Aurel Manga	France	7.62	Q
5	3	Paolo Dal Molin	Italy	7.64	Q
6	2	Asier Martínez	Spain	7.67	Q
7	3	Koen Smet	Netherlands	7.69	q
8	1	Franck Brice Koua	Italy	7.70	q, PB
9	3	Elmo Lakka	Finland	7.71	
10	2	Balázs Baji	Hungary	7.73	
11	2	Vladimir Vukicevic	Norway	7.73	=SB
12	3	Erik Balnuweit	Germany	7.74	
13	1	Enrique Llopis	Spain	7.74	
14	2	Mikdat Sevler	Turkey	7.74	
15	2	Hassane Fofana	Italy	7.75	SB
16	2	Artur Noga	Poland	7.76	
17	3	Milan Trajkovic	Cyprus	7.78	
18	3	Max Hrelja	Sweden	7.83	
19	1	Krzysztof Kiljan	Poland	7.84	
20	3	Bohdan Chornomaz	Ukraine	7.86	
21	1	Andreas Martinsen	Denmark	7.87	
22	2	Brahian Peña	Switzerland	7.87	
23	1	Keiso Pedriks	Estonia	7.93	
24	1	Stanislav Stankov	Bulgaria	7.94	

=== Final ===
Rank	Lane	Athlete	Nationality	Time	Note
1st place, gold medalist(s)	4	Wilhem Belocian	France	7.42	EL
2nd place, silver medalist(s)	6	Andrew Pozzi	Great Britain	7.43	=PB
3rd place, bronze medalist(s)	7	Paolo Dal Molin	Italy	7.56	
4	8	Asier Martínez	Spain	7.60	PB
5	3	Aurel Manga	France	7.63	
6	5	Damian Czykier	Poland	7.63	
7	1	Koen Smet	Netherlands	7.73	
8	2	Franck Brice Koua	Italy	7.76	
