= 2021 European Athletics U23 Championships – Men's 110 metres hurdles =

Men's 110 metres hurdles at the 2021 European Athletics U23 Championships
- Venue: Kadriorg Stadium, Tallinn
- Dates: 9–10 July
- Competitors: 35 from 20 nations
- Winning time: 13.34

Medalists
| gold medal | Asier Martínez | Spain |
| silver medal | Michael Obasuyi | Belgium |
| bronze medal | Enrique Llopis | Spain |

The men's 110 metres hurdles event at the 2021 European Athletics U23 Championships was held in Tallinn, Estonia, at Kadriorg Stadium on 9 and 10 July.

== Records ==
Prior to the competition, the records were as follows:

| European U23 record | Ladji Doucouré (FRA) | 12.97 | Angers, France | 15 July 2005 |
| Championship U23 record | Ladji Doucouré (FRA) | 13.23 | Bydgoszcz, Poland | 20 July 2003 |

== Results ==
=== Round 1 ===
Qualification rule: First 4 in each heat (Q) and the next 4 fastest (q) advance to the Semi-Finals.

Wind:
Heat 1: +0.2 m/s, Heat 2: -1.0 m/s, Heat 3: -0.4 m/s, Heat 4: +0.6 m/s, Heat 5: 0.0 m/s

| Rank | Heat | Name | Nationality | Time | Notes |
|---|---|---|---|---|---|
| 1 | 5 | Asier Martínez | Spain | 13.64 | Q |
| 2 | 3 | Tade Ojora | Great Britain | 13.68 | Q |
| 3 | 4 | Just Kwaou-Mathey | France | 13.74 | Q |
| 4 | 5 | Joshua Zeller | Great Britain | 13.80 | Q |
| 5 | 1 | Michael Obasuyi | Belgium | 13.80 | Q |
| 6 | 1 | Filip Jakob Demšar | Slovenia | 13.84 | Q, NU23R |
| 7 | 1 | Franck Brice Koua | Italy | 13.94 | Q |
| 8 | 4 | Stanislav Stankov | Bulgaria | 13.94 | Q |
| 9 | 4 | Joel Bengtsson | Sweden | 13.95 | Q |
| 10 | 2 | Krzysztof Kiljan | Poland | 13.97 | Q |
| 11 | 2 | Enrique Llopis | Spain | 13.97 | Q |
| 12 | 3 | Kevin Sánchez | Spain | 14.00 | Q |
| 13 | 2 | Mattia Montini | Italy | 14.00 | Q |
| 14 | 5 | Léo El Achkar | France | 14.00 | Q |
| 15 | 3 | Stefan Volzer | Germany | 14.00 | Q |
| 16 | 1 | Alin Ionut Anton | Romania | 14.05 | Q, PB |
| 17 | 4 | Olgierd Michniewski | Poland | 14.14 | Q |
| 18 | 3 | Giuseppe Mattia Filpi | Italy | 14.15 | Q |
| 19 | 5 | David Ryba | Czech Republic | 14.22 | Q |
| 20 | 5 | Leonardo Tano | Hungary | 14.23 | q |
| 21 | 4 | Nick Rüegg | Switzerland | 14.26 | q, =PB |
| 22 | 2 | Oleksiy Ovcharenko | Ukraine | 14.26 | Q, SB |
| 23 | 1 | Martin Täht | Estonia | 14.36 | q |
| 24 | 5 | Andriy Vasylevskyy | Ukraine | 14.40 | q, SB |
| 25 | 3 | Jan Mitsche | Austria | 14.42 | PB |
| 26 | 2 | Juuso Peltola | Finland | 14.43 | |
| 27 | 4 | Kenro Tohter | Estonia | 14.57 | |
| 28 | 1 | Kristiyan Patarov | Bulgaria | 14.62 | |
| 29 | 5 | Micha Rutschmann | Switzerland | 14.64 | |
| 30 | 1 | Maksym Andrukhiv | Ukraine | 14.66 | |
| 31 | 2 | Pavlos Boitsios | Greece | 14.66 | |
| 32 | 3 | Ilias Totolidis | Greece | 14.73 | |
| 33 | 2 | Radin Valchev | Bulgaria | 14.78 | |
| 34 | 3 | Dogukan Kilicoglu | Turkey | 14.82 | |
| 35 | 5 | Atakan Güneş | Turkey | 15.42 | |
| | 2 | Jeanice Laviolette | France | DNS | |

=== Semifinals ===
Qualification rule: First 2 in each heat (Q) and the next 2 fastest (q) advance to the Final.

Wind:
Heat 1: +0.1 m/s, Heat 2: -0.4 m/s, Heat 3: -1.3 m/s

| Rank | Heat | Name | Nationality | Time | Notes |
|---|---|---|---|---|---|
| 1 | 3 | Asier Martínez | Spain | 13.54 | Q |
| 2 | 1 | Michael Obasuyi | Belgium | 13.56 | Q |
| 3 | 2 | Tade Ojora | Great Britain | 13.62 | Q |
| 4 | 3 | Joshua Zeller | Great Britain | 13.68 | Q |
| 5 | 2 | Enrique Llopis | Spain | 13.69 | Q |
| 6 | 3 | Filip Jakob Demšar | Slovenia | 13.73 | q, NU23R |
| 7 | 1 | Just Kwaou-Mathey | France | 13.79 | Q |
| 8 | 2 | Léo El Achkar | France | 13.83 | q |
| 9 | 2 | Franck Brice Koua | Italy | 13.91 | |
| 10 | 1 | Mattia Montini | Italy | 13.92 | =PB |
| 11 | 1 | Stanislav Stankov | Bulgaria | 13.92 | |
| 12 | 3 | Joel Bengtsson | Sweden | 13.98 | |
| 13 | 2 | Krzysztof Kiljan | Poland | 14.01 | |
| 14 | 3 | Giuseppe Mattia Filpi | Italy | 14.14 | |
| 15 | 3 | David Ryba | Czech Republic | 14.16 | |
| 16 | 2 | Oleksiy Ovcharenko | Ukraine | 14.30 | |
| 17 | 1 | Nick Rüegg | Switzerland | 14.33 | |
| 18 | 1 | Olgierd Michniewski | Poland | 14.35 | |
| 19 | 2 | Alin Ionut Anton | Romania | 14.43 | |
| 20 | 3 | Andriy Vasylevskyy | Ukraine | 14.64 | |
| 21 | 1 | Leonardo Tano | Hungary | 15.09 | |
| | 1 | Kevin Sánchez | Spain | DNF | |
| | 2 | Martin Täht | Estonia | DNF | |
| | 3 | Stefan Volzer | Germany | DNS | |

=== Final ===
Wind: –1.6 m/s

| Rank | Lane | Name | Nationality | Time | Notes |
|---|---|---|---|---|---|
| 1st place, gold medalist(s) | 3 | Asier Martínez | Spain | 13.34 | |
| 2nd place, silver medalist(s) | 6 | Michael Obasuyi | Belgium | 13.40 | |
| 3rd place, bronze medalist(s) | 7 | Enrique Llopis | Spain | 13.44 | |
| 4 | 5 | Tade Ojora | Great Britain | 13.45 | |
| 5 | 8 | Just Kwaou-Mathey | France | 13.59 | |
| 6 | 4 | Joshua Zeller | Great Britain | 13.76 | |
| 7 | 1 | Filip Jakob Demšar | Slovenia | 13.81 | |
| 8 | 2 | Léo El Achkar | France | 13.92 | |
