= Javier Ramírez Sinués =

Spanish politician

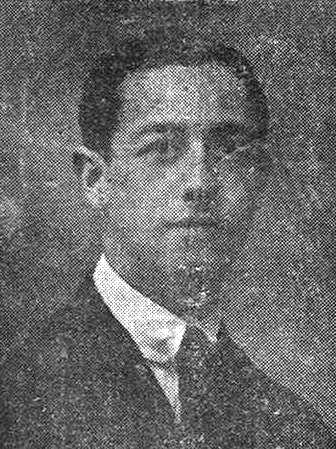
- Born: Javier Ramírez Sinués; 1898; Tauste, Spain
- Died: 1977 (aged 78–79); Zaragoza, Spain
- Occupations: lawyer, landholder
- Known for: politician
- Political party: Carlism, FET

Francisco Javier Ramírez Sinués (1898–1977) was a Spanish politician and official. In the mid-1930s he approached Carlism and in 1933 to 1935 he served as a Traditionalist deputy in the Cortes. He accepted the wartime political unification into Falange Española Tradicionalista. His career climaxed during early Francoism; in 1938 to 1939 he served as civil governor of the province of Soria, and in 1939 to 1943 he performed the same role in the province of Álava. After the mid-1940s he mostly withdrew into privacy, punctuated by sporadic demonstrations of support for the Alfonsist pretender Don Juan and for Franco.

== Family and youth ==
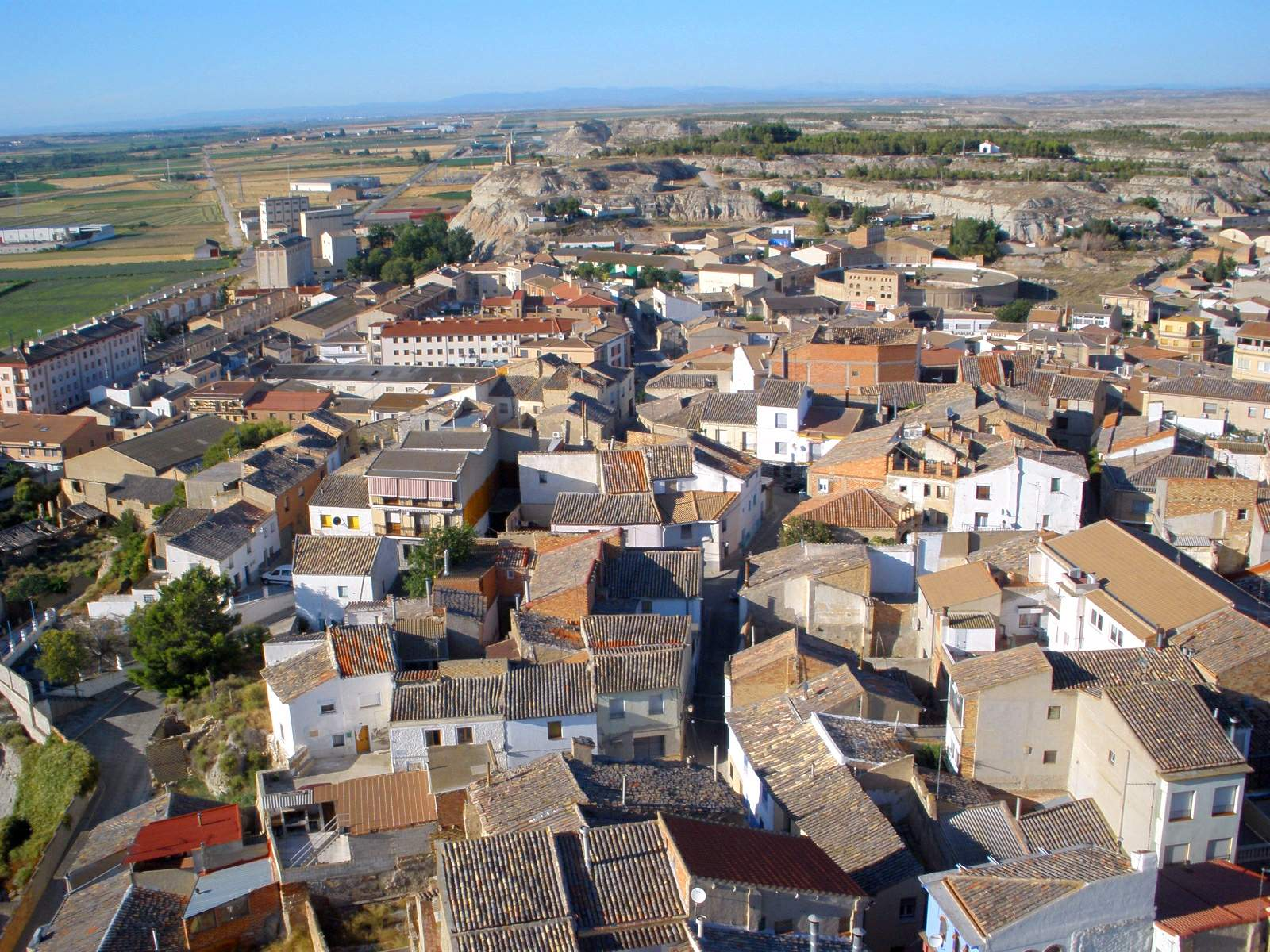
Tauste, present view

The Ramirez family was initially related to Ariza, an Aragonese town near Calatayud. The great-great-grandfather of Ramírez Sinués, Lorenzo Ramírez, left his native village of Bordalba and settled in Tauste in Western Aragón in the late 18th century. In the mid-19th century his son Iñigo Ramírez Martínez was already the first taxpayer of the town, owned some 170 hectares, a mill and a confectionery manufacture. His son and the grandfather of Ramírez Sinués, Angel Ramírez Carrera (1821-1893), purchased further 630 hectares during so-called desamortización de Madóz in the 1860s. He was active in the Conservative Party, served in the provincial diputation and in 1881-1886 held a seat in the Cortes; his career marked the economic and political climax of the family. His son Javier Ramírez Orúe (1871-1943) in 1897 married Manuela Sinués Lambea from the neighboring Gallur (died 1943); she was daughter to local terrateniente family, also enriched during the desamortización.

Ramírez Orúe tried to follow in the footsteps of his father; he was also elected Conservative provincial deputy in 1896 and 1915, in 1917 growing to president of Diputación Provincial de Zaragoza. Despite renewed attempts and due to personal conflict with the Aragonese cacique family of Castellano, he has never managed to obtain the parliamentary ticket. However, his party connections ensured the 1922 nomination to gobernador civil of Valladolid; following 5 months at this post he was transferred to similar role in Tarragona, but for unclear reason Ramírez resigned after just 2 months. Businesswise, he was the moving spirit behind construction of the Gallur-Sádaba railway line, inaugurated in 1915. In 1924-1925 he bought 11,000 ha near Alfajarín and further 10,000 ha near Farlete; historians speculate that both purchases might have been at least partially fictitious, the shady deal agreed with vending local aristocrats. The transactions rendered Ramírez the 24th and then the 11th largest rural taxpayer in Aragon.

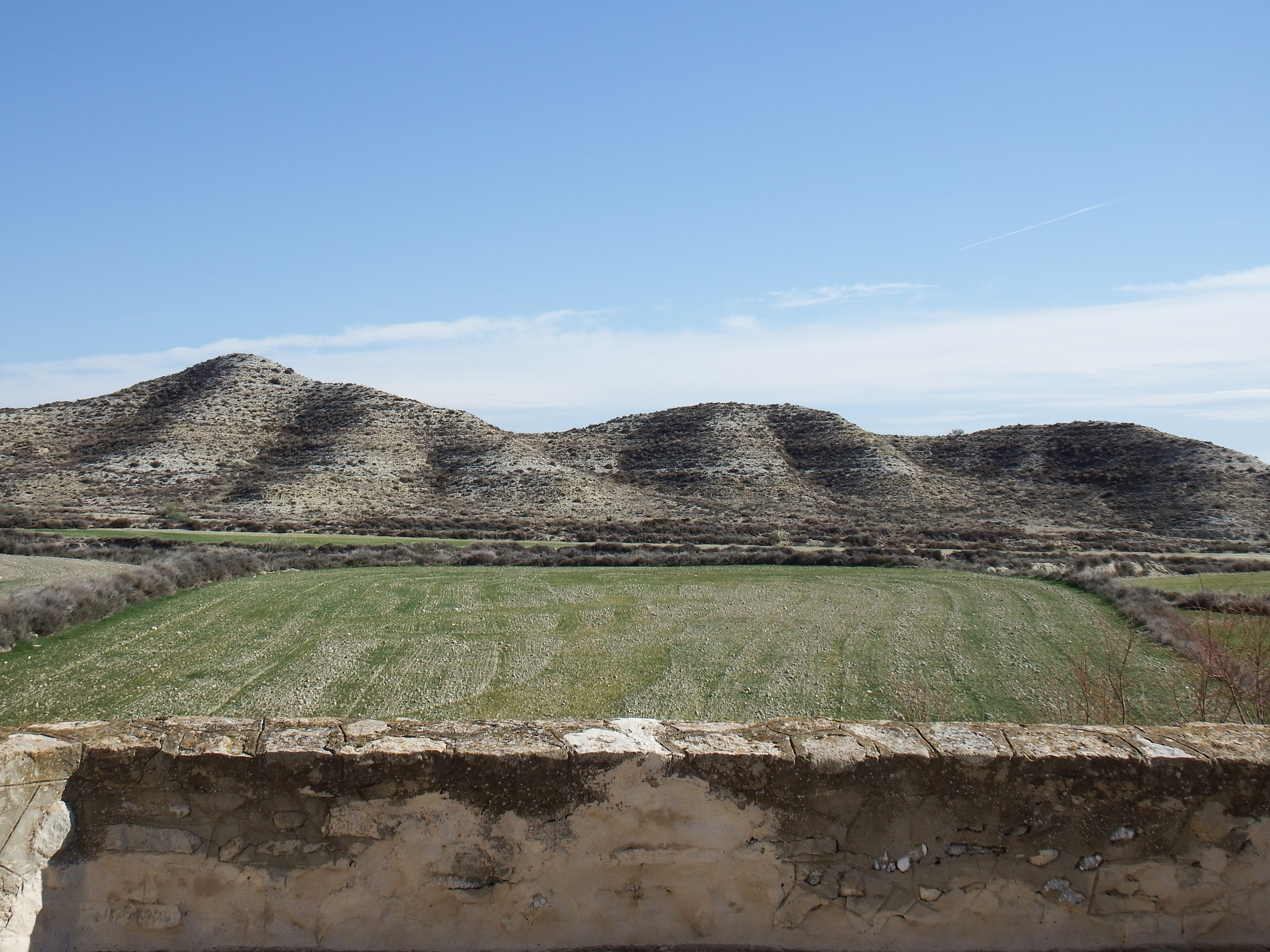
Aragon rural landscape near Farlete

It is not clear whether Javier had any siblings; neither any of the sources consulted provides information on his early education. At unspecified time, though probably at the turn of the 1910s and 1920s, he studied law, most likely at the University of Zaragoza. Following military service in the local Aragón unit in 1923 he married María de los Dolores de Círia del Castillo-Olivares, born in Ciudad Real. She was daughter to Alfredo de Círia y Arbeleche, Conde de Valparaíso and Marqués de Añavete, owner of numerous estates in Aragón and elsewhere. The couple settled in Zaragoza, where Ramírez Sinués practiced as a lawyer. It is not clear to what extent he was involved in management of the massive rural economy of his father; some authors claim he was barely related to his native Tauste, but in public he at times appeared as “agrario”. Javier and Dolores had 7 children, born between the mid-1920s and the late 1930s. None of the Ramírez Círia descendants became a public figure; neither any of 16 grandchildren from Ramírez Martín, Ramírez Días, García Ramírez and Vicente Ramírez families did.

== Carlist ==
Carlist standard

There is no evidence of Ramírez Sinués’ public engagements during the Primo de Rivera dictatorship; information on his activity during the early Republican period is confusing. Some sources claim that he was member of Acción Popular Agraria Aragonesa, the conservative organization animated by local landholders; the Ramirez property was from the onset target of expropriation designs, for the time being delayed by talks about voluntary cession of some property. Other sources maintain that already in 1931 Ramírez entered Comunión Tradicionalista and contributed to its local weekly, Lunes. During the 1933 election campaign he was initially reported as a candidate of Candidatura de Defensa Agraria, which was soon re-formatted as a coalition list of Unión de Derechas; the Carlists advertised him as their candidate. He was comfortably elected and joined the Carlist parliamentary minority.

Ramírez was barely active in Cortes, and his interventions were related mostly to agriculture. As full-time member he entered Comisión de Importaciones de Trigo, and as deputy commissions of audit, budget and war. In 1934 he formed a commission investigating the October events in Barcelona and afterwards he signed a related motion to bring Azaña before Tribunal de Garantias. He was known mostly for initiatives related to infrastructure buildup in Aragón: development of telephone grid, trade, railway network, hydrographic works and sugar beets industry; during some of these projects he worked with another Aragón deputy, Ramón Serrano Suñer.

Within Carlism Ramiréz remained in the second row; he did not enter the party executive bodies and seldom spoke at public rallies. A scholarly monograph barely mentions his name. His appearances are related to religious events rather than to strictly Traditionalist gatherings, mostly in Aragón and exceptionally also elsewhere. In Carlist propaganda he was dedicated relatively little space. In terms of political strategy he joined the faction which supported a general monarchist alliance; in 1935 Ramírez was among signatories of the newly founded Bloque Nacional, entered its local Aragonese presidency and appeared in some common propaganda initiatives. In 1935 he was appointed delegado regional of Juventudes Tradicionalistas. He did not field his candidature in the 1936 elections and it is not clear whether he was engaged in fighting expropriation, which eventually affected the Ramírez properties in May 1936.

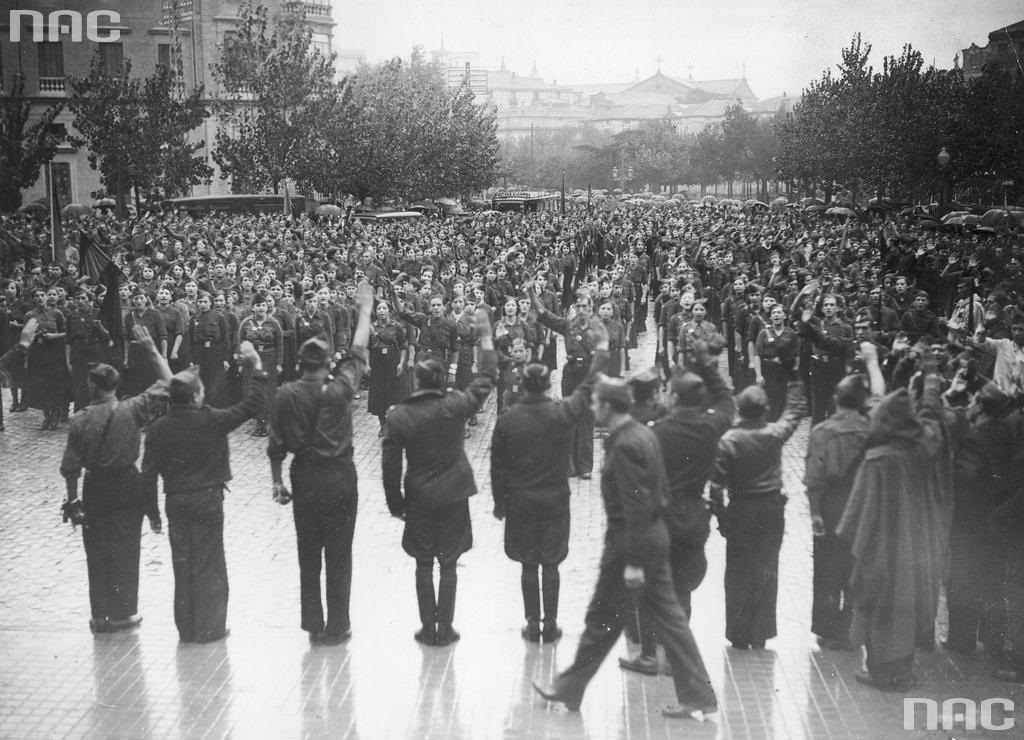
Zaragoza, late 1936

Ramírez’ fate during first years of the Civil War is not clear. Western Aragón was easily seized by the Nationalists during the first week of the conflict and it seems that as teniente de reserva Ramírez joined rebel units. Some later press notes claimed he volunteered as “combatiente de primera hora” and headed "Tercio de Aragón”, others note his important role “en la Milicia”. Also the British scholar maintains he was incorporated in requeté. Others maintain he acted as “capitan de complemento” of an infantry unit. His military career ended in the summer of 1938, when he served in Regimento de Infantería de Gerona, deployed at combat positions in Balaguer in western Catalonia. He was decorated with Medalla de la Campaña, two red crosses and a Cruz de Guerra.

== Civil governor ==
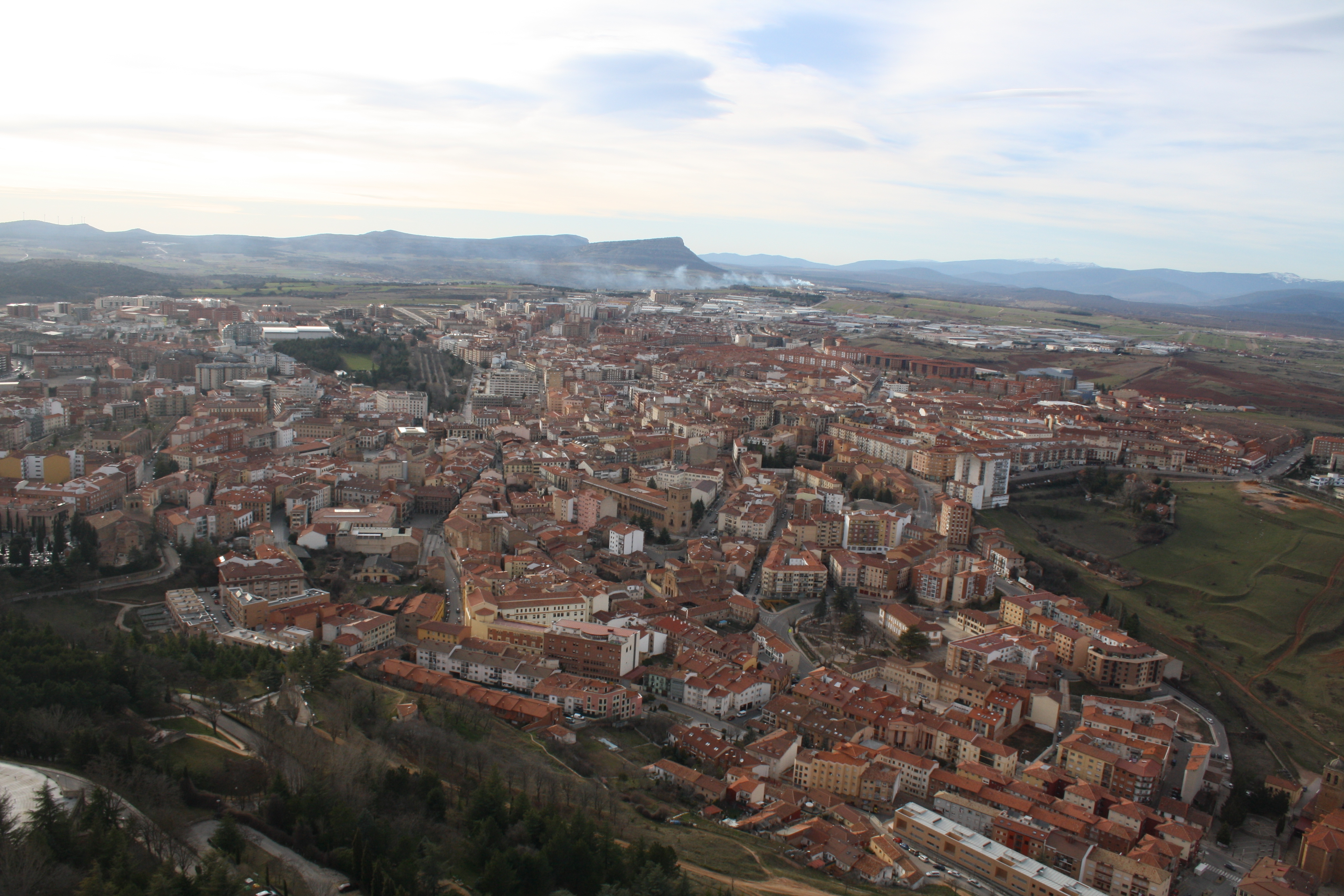
landascape from Soria

In late August 1938 Ramírez was appointed the civil governor of Soria; it took him few weeks before he left his combat unit and assumed the post. None of the sources consulted traces the mechanism of his elevation, but one author suggests that it might have been related to his acquaintance with Serrano Suñer. Ramírez was member of his network of Aragonese associates and his appointment formed part of Serrano-driven “aragonese overrepresentation” among the governors of the era, especially that Ramírez had no reservations about the 1937-declared forced political unification and Carlist amalgamation into a new state party; press notes claimed that he “enthusiastically joined” FET. His spell in Soria lasted almost exactly a year and it proved completely routine. Following initial ritual declaration of loyalty to Franco, which nevertheless contained references to “delicada misión” and “más imparcial rectitud”, Ramírez was noted in public as engaged in conventional administrative tasks, marked by confronting shortages and hardships of wartime era. Apart from numerous propaganda and religious events, the most ambitious project was about major refurbishment of water supply network for the residents of Soria.

In late August 1939 Ramírez was released from his post in Soria and appointed to the parallel role of civil governor of Álava, where he replaced another Traditionalism-related gobernador, Francisco Sáenz de Tejada y Olozaga. His assignment in Vascongadas lasted almost 4 years, until July 1943. His term was unusually long compared to other governor appointments of this period, which barely endured 2 years; it was related to Ramírez’ personal links with Serrano Suñer and Rodezno. Apart from the usual propaganda and admin tasks, it was marked in particular by his attempts to address the problem of supplies.

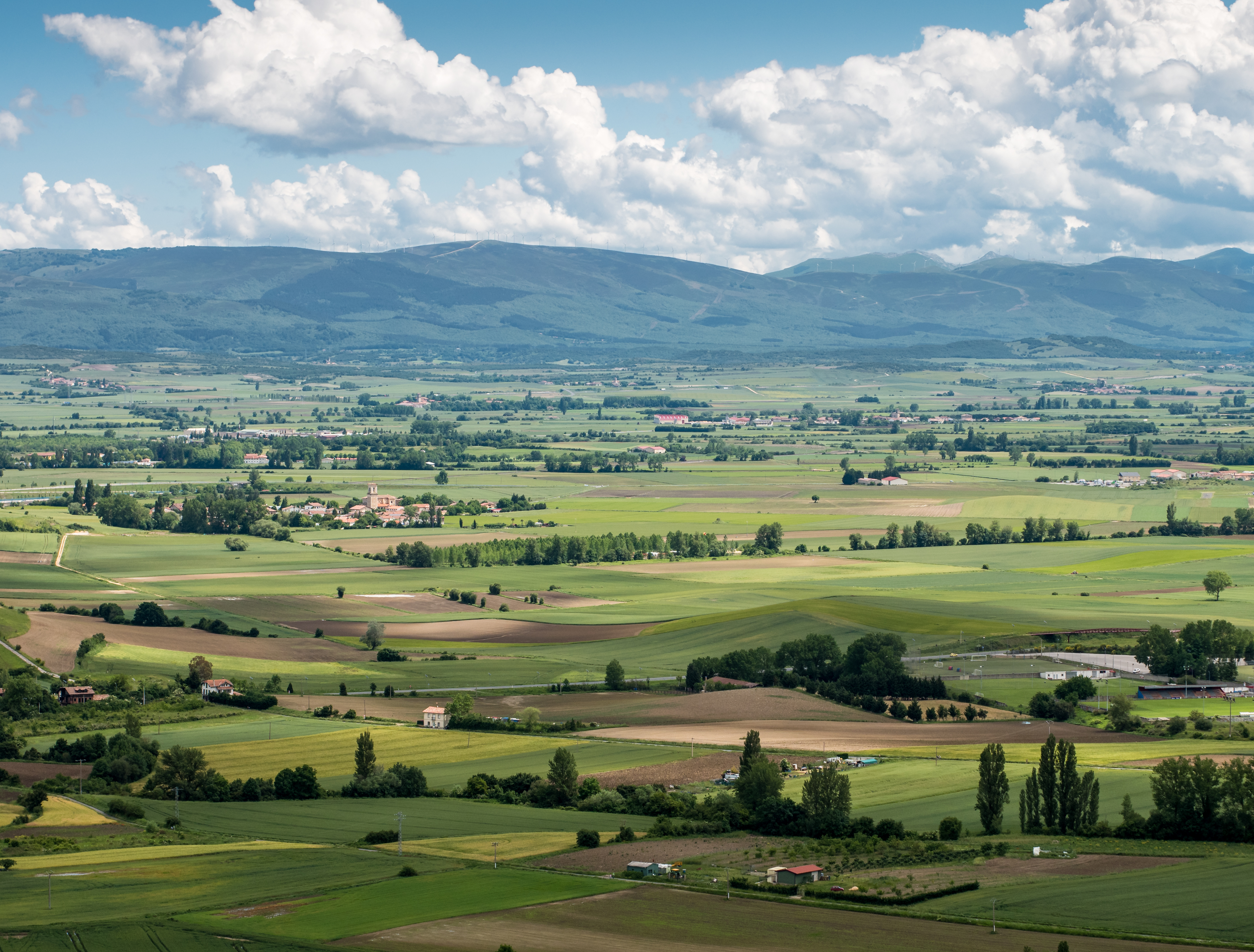
landscape from Álava

In political terms Ramírez was trapped in internal power struggle between radical Falangists, generic conservatives and Carlists, but scholarly opinions on his role differ. One author claims that his arrival provided a new impulse for implementation of falangism in the province, though he suggest that the key role was played by the new provincial FET leader, Alfonso Sanz Gómez. Other historian maintains that both Ramírez and his predecessor “no se mostraron excesivamente adictos ni al Partido ni a las políticas que éste quería llevar cabo”. One more scholar maintains that under his leadership national-syndicalism in Álava was reduced mostly to declarations, and that in fact traditional conservative groupings gained predominance by integration within the regime structures. According to this reading, Ramírez went well with the caciquista current related to the Oriol family, which represented “pragmatismo y tecnicismo”. Faced with the conflict between Oriolista-dominated diputación provincial and local Falange, Ramírez tended to side with the former, and supported individuals of Carlist background endangered by purges. However, he also presided over gradual domestication and watering-down of Alavese Carlism.

== Withdrawal into privacy ==
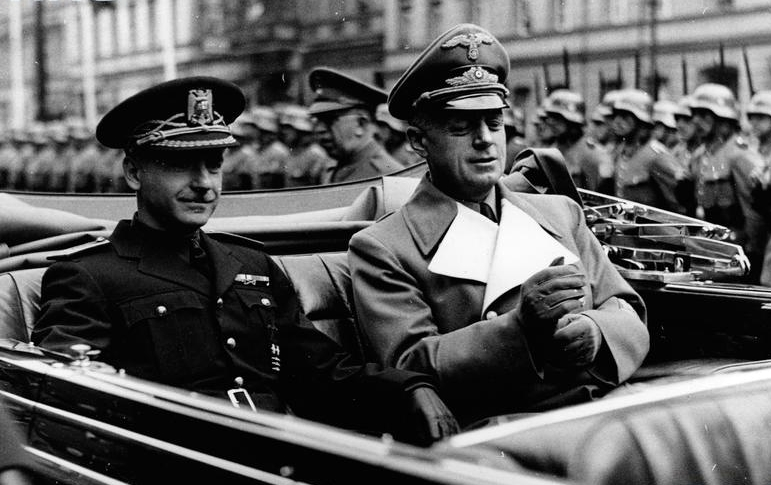
Ramón Serrano Suñer

When in the summer of 1943 Ramírez ceased as the civil governor he was not appointed to any other official post in the administration. None of the sources consulted provides any insight as to his departure from the civil servant service. In particular, it is not clear whether it was related to the 1942 marginalisation of his political sponsor, Ramón Serrano Suñer. Some authors suggest that in Álava he fell victim of the new practice of unifying the roles of civil governor and provincial FET leader, but they do not shed light on termination of his official career in general. It is unlikely that he fell from grace, as in the mid-1940s the tightly censored press occasionally mentioned his name as the ex-gobernador. Some time between the mid-1940s and the mid-1950s for unspecified time he served as director of Compañía Telefónica, one of major telecommunications companies in Spain.

During the next 30 years and until his death Ramírez disappeared almost entirely from the public eye. It is unclear whether he resumed his lawyer career in Zaragoza or rather turned towards the rural economy, inherited from his late father. Very sporadically he appeared in the societé columns, usually in relation to various family events. In the early 1950s it might have appeared that his re-entry into politics was near; in 1953 and 1954 he was a few times admitted by fellow ex-Carlist, the Cortes speaker Esteban Bilbao. In 1954 he appeared at an official religious event, highly flavored with Traditionalism, this time along another ex-Carlist, the minister of justice Antonio Iturmendi. Franco talked to him during official audiences in 1954 and 1956, but the subject of their talks is unknown. However, no official appointment materialized.

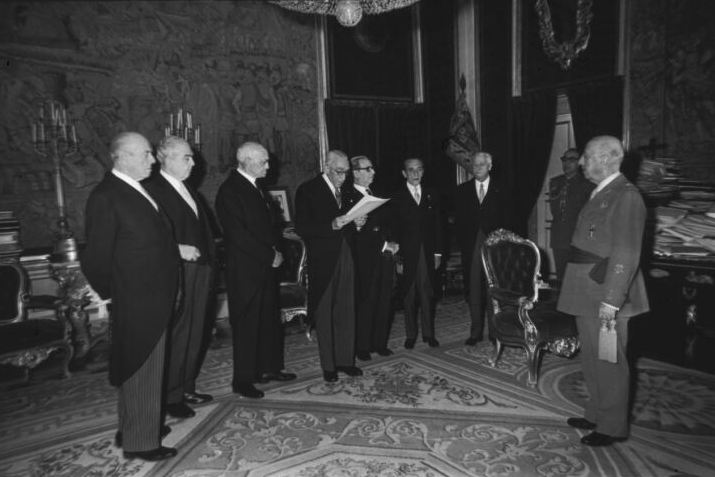
Ramírez (6fL) during homage address of Traditionalist ex-deputies to Franco, 1969

After official unification Ramírez did not engage in Carlist structures. Informally he maintained links with so-called Rodeznistas, the faction co-operating with the regime and increasingly leaning towards dynastical leadership of the Alfonsist pretender, Don Juan. This stand was officially acknowledged when in late 1957 Ramírez joined some 60 Carlists who visited the claimant in his Estoril residence; following Don Juan's declaration which fully embraced traditionalist principles, the so-called “estorilos” declared him the legitimate Carlist heir. The move did not impair Ramírez relations with the regime, as in 1960 he was awarded Gran Order de la Orden de Merito Civil. Another of his isolated political appearances was dated 1969, when following expulsion of the Javierista pretender Don Carlos Hugo the Franco regime was eager to demonstrate that caudillo still enjoyed unconditional Carlist support. Ramírez appeared along “former traditionalist combatants” led by Ricardo Oreja Elosegui; in name of their fellow ex-requetés the group delivered the loyalty address. This proved the last Ramírez’ public representation. His 1977 death went entirely unnoticed.

== See also ==
- Traditionalism (Spain)
- Carlo-francoism
- Carlism
