= Tauste =

- municipality
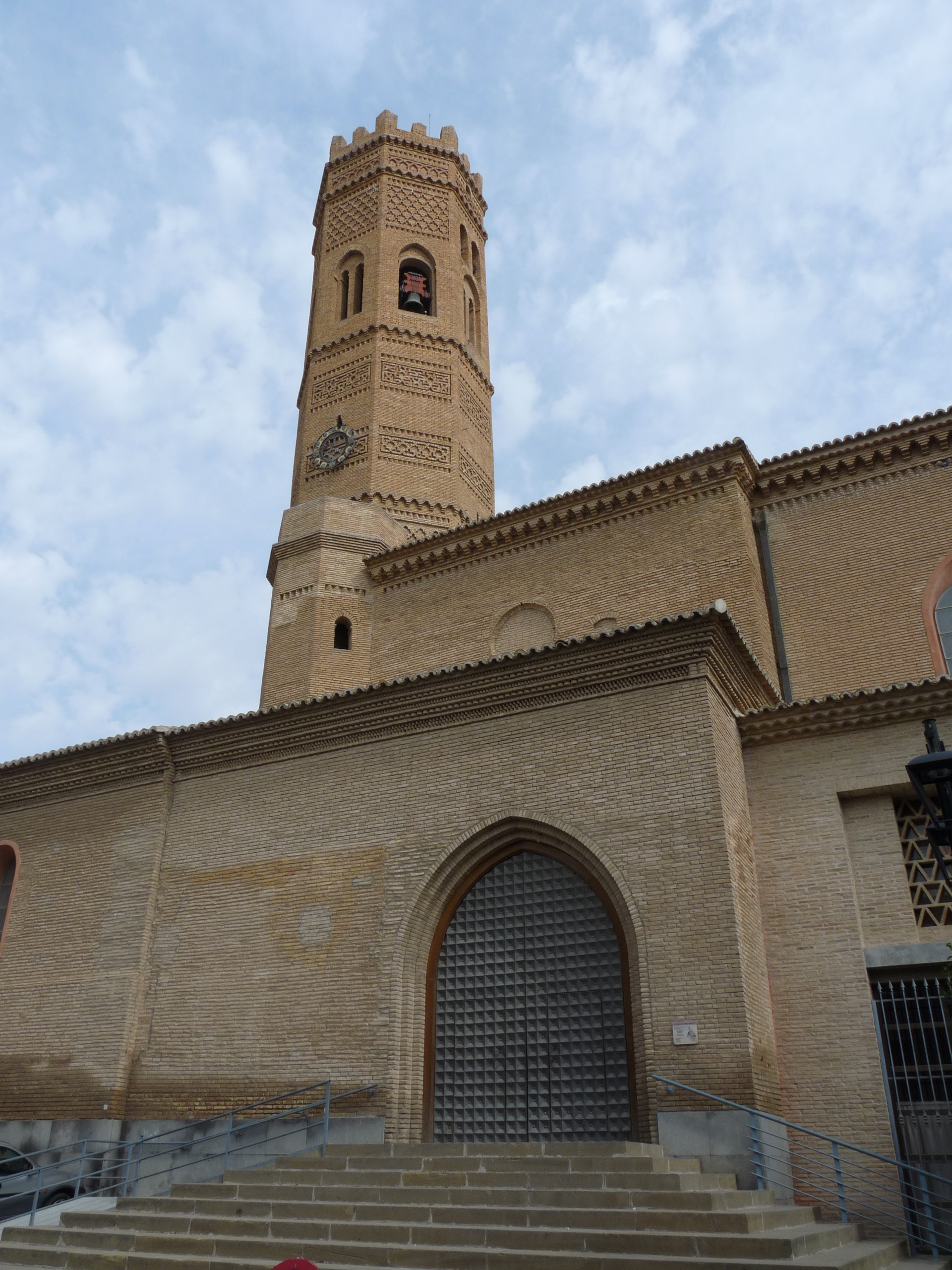

- Coat of arms

- Location in Spain.
- Coordinates: 41°55′N 1°15′W
- Country: Spain
- Autonomous community: Aragon
- Province: Zaragoza
- Comarca: Cinco Villas

Government
  - Mayor: Miguel Ángel Francés Carbone

Area
  - Total: 405 km^{2} (156 sq mi)
- Elevation: 267 m (876 ft)

Population (2025-01-01)
  - Total: 6,838
  - Density: 16.9/km^{2} (43.7/sq mi)
- Time zone: UTC+1 (CET)
  - Summer (DST): UTC+2 (CEST)
- Postal code: 50660
- Website: Official website

Tauste (Aragonese: Taust) is a municipality located in the province of Zaragoza, Aragon, Spain.

== History ==
Sights include the Mudéjar church of Santa María, begun in the late 13th century and finished in the 14th century. It has an octagonal tower, a Baroque retable (16th century) and a Renaissance retable of the Coronation of Mary.

In November 2020, archaeologists headed by Javier Nunez Arce announced the discovery of 400 Islamic graves belong to Al-Andalus era. After this discovery it was clear that Muslim community used to live here and they had a Mosque. Archaeologist Arce mentioned Tauste as an important settlement for Muslims and added that "we can see that the Muslim culture and the Islamic presence in this region are more significant than we think."

== Twin towns ==
- Espalion, France
- Langhirano, Italy

== Related personalities ==
- Fray Antonio Asensio Andrés (1280–c. 1320), Franciscan theologian
- Juan Belveder (16th century), mathematician
- Marcelino Uberte de la Cerda (17th century), author of medical publications, poet
- Juan de Jarauta Zapata (1664–1717), silversmith
- Jaime Ortega y Olleta (1817–1860), military and politician
- Angel Ramírez Carrera (1821–1893), conservative politician, Cortes deputy
- Mariano Supervía Lostalé (1835–1918), bishop of Huesca
- Javier Ramírez Orúe (1871–1943), conservative politician, president of Diputación Provincial
- Pedro Longás Bartibás (1881–1968), historian and archivist
- Javier Ramírez Sinués (1898–1977), Carlist politician, Cortes deputy and civil governor
- Tomás Aragüés Bayarte (1903–1956), composer
- José María Conget Arizaleta (1926–2001), bishop of Jaca
- Zacarías Alegre Pellicer (1943–2011), sculptor
- Chusé Inazio Nabarro (born 1962), writer

== See also ==
- List of municipalities in Zaragoza
