= Antonino Trio =

Italian long jumper

Personal information
- Nickname: Antonio
- Nationality: Italian
- Born: 4 June 1993 (age 33) Milazzo, Italy

Sport
- Country: Italy
- Sport: Athletics
- Event: Long jump
- Club: Athletic Club 96 Alperia

Achievements and titles
- Personal bests: Long jump: 7.96 m (2020); Long jump indoor: 7.94 m (2021); Triple jump: 15.98 m (2014)

Antonino Trio (born 4 June 1993) is an Italian long jumper, that in addition to having won an absolute Italian title at a senior level, he finished twice in the top 60 in the IAAF world leading list, in 2018 at 37th place with 7.88 m and in 2019 at 35th with 7.87 m.

== Biography ==
Despite being both long jumpers and also carrying the same surname, he is not a relative of the former Italian champion Maria Vittoria Trio.

== Personal bests ==
- Long jump: 7.96 m (+0.5) ( (Italy) Palermo, 25 July 2020)
- Long jump indoor: 7.94 m ( (Italy) Ancona, 17 February 2018)
- Triple jump: 15.98 m (+1.2) ( (Italy) Palermo, 10 May 2014)

== National titles ==
- Italian Athletics Indoor Championships
  - Long jump: 2018, 2021
