= David Omoregie =

British athletics competitor (born 1995)

Personal information
- Nationality: British
- Born: 1 November 1995 (age 30) Durham, England
- Height: 185 cm (6 ft 1 in)
- Weight: 80 kg (176 lb)

Sport
- Sport: Track and field
- Event: 110 metres hurdles
- Club: Cardiff Amateur Athletic Club
- Coached by: Benke Blomkvist

Achievements and titles
- Personal bests: 110 m hurdles: 13.24; 60 m hurdles: 7.68

David Omoregie (born 1 November 1995) is a Welsh track and field hurdler who competes in the 110 metres hurdles. He holds a personal best of 13.24 seconds for the event, fifth best among British hurdlers. He set world junior and European junior records in the 60 metres hurdles indoor. He won a bronze medal at the 2014 World Junior Championships in Athletics and won the 2015 European Athletics U23 Championships

== Career ==
=== Early life and career ===
A member of Pembrokeshire Harriers and then Cardiff Amateur Athletic Club, Omoregie took part in athletics from a young age and focused on the combined track and field events. Born in Durham, England, both his parents emigrated from Nigeria at age twenty. In 2011, his father died of cancer shortly after his sister had died in a car crash. Omoregie focused on athletics and his schoolwork as a tribute to them and received five A stars in his GCSEs that year. He was the Welsh youth champion in the pentathlon in 2012 then won the English indoor junior championship in the men's heptathlon in 2013. That year, he began to focus more on his best event – sprint hurdling. At the 2013 European Athletics Junior Championships he set a best of 13.45 seconds for the junior 110 m hurdles in qualifying before placing fifth in the final. He was Welsh junior champion in the hurdles and also runner-up at the English junior championship.

Omoregie progressed further in 2014 season, starting with a third place at the British Indoor Athletics Championships in the 60 metres hurdles (in a personal best of 7.82 seconds). Over the junior hurdles, he ran 7.50 seconds indoors, which equalled the World indoor junior record of Konstadinos Douvalidis. Outdoors, he won the 2014 British U20 Championships with a European junior record of 13.17 seconds for the 99 cm hurdles event. This was later beaten that year by Wilhem Belocian of France. He came up against his rival at the 2014 World Junior Championships in Athletics and, though Belocian won, Omoregie took the bronze medal. Over the senior height hurdles, Omoregie set a best of 13.53 seconds that year and was the winner at the Welsh Athletics Championships.

=== Senior career ===
His senior career proper began in 2015 and he competed in the indoor circuit. He was runner-up to Lawrence Clarke at the British Indoor Athletics Championships and made the semi-finals at the 2015 European Athletics Indoor Championships (his senior international debut). He moved to Loughborough and began working with Benke Blomkvist – coach to Dai Greene. He won the British under-23 title outdoors and followed this with a win at the 2015 European Athletics U23 Championships in 13.63 seconds. He slightly improved his best towards the end of the season, with 13.50 seconds at the London Grand Prix.

At the 2016 Welsh Indoor Championships, he was runner-up to David King while at the British Indoor Championships, he came third after Andrew Pozzi and Lawrence Clarke. He topped the podium at the British Universities Championships indoor and outdoors, however. He was beaten into second place by King at the British U23 Championships and was behind him in fourth at the British Athletics Championships. A sudden improvement to 13.25 seconds came in Loughborough. This moved him to fifth on the all-time British rankings for the 110 m hurdles, but was a week after the deadline for Olympic qualifying times. He was fifth at the London Grand Prix that year and won the English Athletics Championships. He demonstrated his run in Loughborough was not a one-off with a win at the ISTAF Berlin, recording a new best of 13.24 seconds and beating world medallist Pascal Martinot-Lagarde.

== Personal bests ==
Senior

- 110 metres hurdles – 13.24 (2016)
- 60 metres hurdles – 7.68 (2016)

Junior

- 110 m hurdles (99 cm) – 13.17 (2014)
- 60 m hurdles (99 cm) – 7.50 (2014)
- Decathlon – 6723 pts (2013)
- Indoor heptathlon – 5067 pts (2013)
- High Jump - 192 cm (2013)

All information from All-Athletics profile

== International competitions ==
Year	Competition	Venue	Position	Event	Notes
2013	European Junior Championships	Rieti, Italy	5th	110 m hurdles (99 cm)	13.49
2014	World Junior Championships	Eugene, United States	3rd	110 m hurdles (99 cm)	13.35
2015	European Indoor Championships	Prague, Czech Republic	8th (sf)	60 m hurdles	7.76
2015	European U23 Championships	Tallinn, Estonia	1st	110 m hurdles	13.63
2017	European Indoor Championships	Belgrade, Serbia	12th (h)	60 m hurdles	7.71
2017	European Team Championships	Lille, France	3rd	110 m hurdles	13.36
2017	World Championships	London, United Kingdom	26th (h)	110 m hurdles	13.59
2018	Commonwealth Games	Gold Coast, Australia	14th (h)	110 m hurdles	14.20

== National titles ==
- Welsh Athletics Championships
  - 110 m hurdles: 2014
- English Athletics Championships
  - 110 m hurdles: 2016
