= 2015 European Athletics U23 Championships – Men's 110 metres hurdles =

The men's 110 metres hurdles event at the 2015 European Athletics U23 Championships was held in Tallinn, Estonia, at Kadriorg Stadium on 10 and 11 July.

== Medalists ==
Gold	Luca Nitulescu; Romania
Silver	David Omoregie; United Kingdom
Bronze	Javier Colomo; Spain

== Results ==
=== Final ===
11 July
Wind: -1.5 m/s

Rank	Name	Nationality	Reaction Time	Time	Notes
1st place, gold medalist(s)	Luca Nitulescu	Romania	0.135	13.44	
2nd place, silver medalist(s)	David Omoregie	United Kingdom	0.155	13.63	
3rd place, bronze medalist(s)	Javier Colomo	Spain	0.167	13.73	PB
4	Lorenzo Perini	Italy	0.143	13.86	SB
5	David King	United Kingdom	0.162	13.90	
6	Brahian Peña	Switzerland	0.160	13.90	PB
7	Elmo Lakka	Finland	0.132	14.03	
8	Nicolas Borome	France	0.159	14.05	
9	Valdó Szűcs	Hungary	0.150	14.13	

=== Heats ===
10 July

==== Heat 1 ====
Wind: -0.2 m/s

Rank	Name	Nationality	Reaction Time	Time	Notes
1	David Omoregie	United Kingdom	0.158	13.85	Q
2	Elmo Lakka	Finland	0.143	13.90	Q
3	Brahian Peña	Switzerland	0.160	13.93	PB Q
4	Javier Colomo	Spain	0.165	13.96	=SB q
5	Vitali Parakhonka	Belarus	0.150	14.10	
6	Simone Poccia	Italy	0.190	14.20	
7	Keiso Pedriks	Estonia	0.163	14.38	SB
	Sebastian Barth	Germany	0.156	DNF	

==== Heat 2 ====
Wind: -0.9 m/s

Rank	Name	Nationality	Reaction Time	Time	Notes
1	David King	United Kingdom	0.125	13.74	Q
2	Lorenzo Perini	Italy	0.154	13.97	Q
3	Valdó Szűcs	Hungary	0.177	13.98	PB Q
4	Nicolas Borome	France	0.135	14.05	q
5	Václav Sedlák	Czech Republic	0.130	14.09	
6	Khai Riley-Laborde	United Kingdom	0.153	14.09	
7	René Mählmann	Germany	0.124	14.11	
8	Maurus Meyer	Switzerland	0.125	14.33	SB

== Participation ==
According to an unofficial count, 16 athletes from 11 countries participated in the event.

- Belarus (1)
- Czech Republic (1)
- Estonia (1)
- Finland (1)
- France (1)
- Germany (2)
- Hungary (1)
- Italy (2)
- Spain (1)
- Switzerland (2)
- United Kingdom (3)
