= 2021 Italian Athletics Indoor Championships =

Italian athletic competition

- Dates: 20-21 February
- Host city: Ancona
- Venue: Palaindoor di Ancona
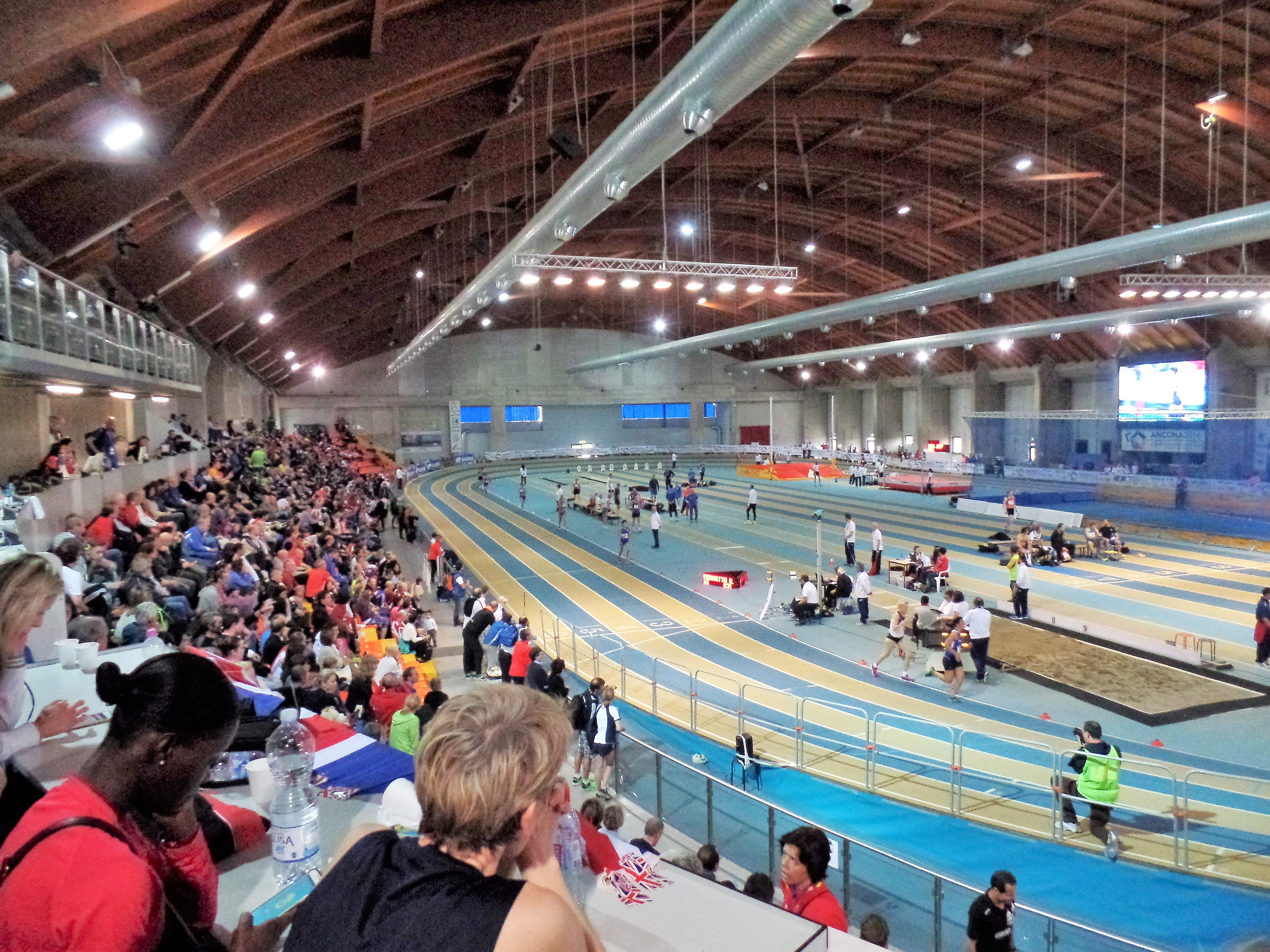
- Level: Senior
- Events: 26

2021 Italian Athletics Indoor Championships is the 52nd edition of the Italian Athletics Indoor Championships held in Ancona.

== Champions ==
Event	Men	Performance	Women	Performance
60 m	Marcell Jacobs	6.55	Vittoria Fontana	7.35
400 m	Vladimir Aceti	46.57	Rebecca Borga	52.69
800 m	Simone Barontini	1:47.51	Elena Bellò	2:04.45
1500 m	Pietro Arese	3:40.54	Gaia Sabbatini	4:13.70
3000 m	Pietro Arese	8:04.03	Giulia Aprile	9:09.26
Relay 4x2 rounds	CUS Pro Patria Milano; Francesco Rossi; Andrea Panassidi; Mattia Casarico; Marco Lo Verme	3:15.72	Centro Sportivo Esercito; Alice Mangione; Valentina Cavalleri; Marta Milani; Raphaela Lukudo	3:38.42
60 m hs	Franck Koua	7.78 PB	Elisa Di Lazzaro	8.16
5000/3000 m race walk	Federico Tontodonati	19:33.71	Valentina Trapletti	12:43.04
High jump	Gianmarco Tamberi	2.35 m WL	Alessia Trost	1.92 m
Pole vault	Max Mandusic	5.52 m	Roberta Bruni	4.41 m
Long jump	Antonino Trio	7.94 m	Larissa Iapichino	6.91 m NR (indoor) WJR
Triple jump	Tobia Bocchi	16.79 m	Dariya Derkach	13.82 m
Shot put	Leonardo Fabbri	20.36 m	Chiara Rosa	17.40 m
Combined events (heptahlon/pentathlon)	Dario Dester	6,076 pts NR	Marta Giovannini	3,991 pts

Note:

- Full results.
