= 2013 European Athletics U23 Championships – Men's 110 metres hurdles =

The Men's 110 metres hurdles event at the 2013 European Athletics U23 Championships was held in Tampere, Finland, at Ratina Stadium on 12 and 13 July.

== Medalists ==
Gold	Simon Krauss; France
Silver	Koen Smet; Netherlands
Bronze	Gregor Traber; Germany

== Results ==
=== Final ===
13 July 2013 / 20:40
Wind: -0.4 m/s

Rank	Name	Nationality	Lane	Reaction Time	Time	Notes
1st place, gold medalist(s)	Simon Krauss	France	3	0.165	13.55	PB
2nd place, silver medalist(s)	Koen Smet	Netherlands	6	0.151	13.58	PB
3rd place, bronze medalist(s)	Gregor Traber	Germany	5	0.142	13.66	
4	Vladimir Vukicevic	Norway	2	0.153	13.74	
5	James Gladman	United Kingdom	1	0.184	13.75	
6	Dario De Borger	Belgium	7	0.116	13.79	SB
7	Aliaksandr Linnik	Belarus	4	0.156	13.82	
8	Milan Trajkovic	Cyprus	8	0.110	14.22	

=== Heats ===
Qualified: First 3 in each heat (Q) and 2 best performers (q) advance to the Final

==== Summary ====
Rank	Name	Nationality	Time	Notes
1	Aliaksandr Linnik	Belarus	13.76	Q PB
2	Simon Krauss	France	13.78	Q
3	Gregor Traber	Germany	13.81	Q
4	Dario De Borger	Belgium	13.85	Q
5	Koen Smet	Netherlands	13.86	Q
6	Vladimir Vukicevic	Norway	13.89	q
7	Milan Trajkovic	Cyprus	13.94	Q
8	James Gladman	United Kingdom	14.02	q
9	Hassane Fofana	Italy	14.05	
10	Kiril Nevdakh	Russia	14.10	
11	Milan Ristić	Serbia	14.12	PB
12	Petr Peňáz	Czech Republic	14.17	
13	Pedro García	Spain	14.20	
14	Sebastian Barth	Germany	14.21	
15	Jussi Kanervo	Finland	14.35	
16	Samuel Remédios	Portugal	14.88	

==== Details ====
===== Heat 1 =====
12 July 2013 / 12:10 Wind: -2.7 m/s

Rank	Name	Nationality	Lane	Reaction Time	Time	Notes
1	Simon Krauss	France	7	0.173	13.78	Q
2	Gregor Traber	Germany	4	0.159	13.81	Q
3	Dario De Borger	Belgium	8	0.150	13.85	Q
4	Vladimir Vukicevic	Norway	5	0.143	13.89	q
5	Hassane Fofana	Italy	6	0.208	14.05	
6	Milan Ristić	Serbia	3	0.174	14.12	PB
7	Jussi Kanervo	Finland	1	0.150	14.35	
8	Samuel Remédios	Portugal	2	0.214	14.88	

===== Heat 2 =====
12 July 2013 / 12:18 Wind: -1.1 m/s

Rank	Name	Nationality	Lane	Reaction Time	Time	Notes
1	Aliaksandr Linnik	Belarus	7	0.144	13.76	Q PB
2	Koen Smet	Netherlands	4	0.162	13.86	Q
3	Milan Trajkovic	Cyprus	3	0.167	13.94	Q
4	James Gladman	United Kingdom	2	0.172	14.02	q
5	Kiril Nevdakh	Russia	6	0.136	14.10	
6	Petr Peňáz	Czech Republic	5	0.191	14.17	
7	Pedro García	Spain	8	0.167	14.20	
8	Sebastian Barth	Germany	1	0.146	14.21	

== Participation ==
According to an unofficial count, 16 athletes from 15 countries participated in the event.

- Belarus (1)
- Belgium (1)
- Cyprus (1)
- Czech Republic (1)
- Finland (1)
- France (1)
- Germany (2)
- Italy (1)
- Netherlands (1)
- Norway (1)
- Portugal (1)
- Russia (1)
- Serbia (1)
- Spain (1)
- United Kingdom (1)
