= 2018 Italian Athletics Indoor Championships =

- Dates: 16–18 February
- Host city: Ancona
- Level: Senior
- Events: 24

2018 Italian Athletics Indoor Championships was the 49th edition of the Italian Athletics Indoor Championships and were held in Ancona.

== Champions ==
Event	Men	Performance	Women	Performance
60 m	Michael Tumi	6.70	Anna Bongiorni	7.27
400 m	Vladimir Aceti	46.95	Raphaela Lukudo	53.08
800 m	Simone Barontini	1:49.99	Elena Bellò	2:05.3
1500 m	Yassin Bouih	3:44.19	Margherita Magnani	4:17.11
3000 m	Yassin Bouih	8:17.99	Margherita Magnani	9:15.90
60 m hs	Hassane Fofana	7.66	Veronica Borsi	8.19
5000/3000 m race walk	Francesco Fortunato	18:55.26	Antonella Palmisano	11:55.30
Long jump	Antonino Trio	7.88 m	Tania Vicenzino	6.52 m
Triple jump	Fabrizio Donato	16.94 m	Ottavia Cestonaro	13.47 m
High jump	Stefano Sottile	2.24 m	Alessia Trost	1.90 m
Pole vault	Claudio Stecchi	5.55 m	Roberta Bruni	4.35 m
Shot put	Leonardo Fabbri	19.17 m	Chiara Rosa	16.71 m

== See also ==
- 2017 Italian Athletics Championships
