= Brahian Peña =

Swiss hurdler (born 1994)

Personal information
- Born: 3 April 1994 (age 32)

Sport
- Sport: Athletics
- Event: 110 m hurdles

Brahian de Jesus Peña Roque (born 3 April 1994) is a Swiss athlete specialising in the sprint hurdles. Until 2011 he represented the Dominican Republic. He competed at the 2016 World Indoor Championships without advancing

== Competition record ==
Year	Competition	Venue	Position	Event	Notes
Representing Switzerland
2012	World Junior Championships	Barcelona, Spain	18th (sf)	110 m hurdles (99 cm)	13.90
2012	World Junior Championships	Barcelona, Spain	–	4 × 100 m relay	DQ
2013	European Junior Championships	Rieti, Italy	3rd	110 m hurdles (99 cm)	13.31
2013	European Junior Championships	Rieti, Italy	6th	4 × 100 m relay	40.26
2015	European U23 Championships	Tallinn, Estonia	5th	110 m hurdles	13.90
2015	European U23 Championships	Tallinn, Estonia	9th (h)	4 × 100 m relay	40.61
2016	World Indoor Championships	Portland, United States	22nd (h)	60 m hurdles	7.87
2016	European Championships	Amsterdam, Netherlands	18th (h)	110 m hurdles	13.98
2018	European Championships	Berlin, Germany	16th (h)	110 m hurdles	14.50
2019	European Indoor Championships	Glasgow, United Kingdom	22nd (h)	60 m hurdles	7.93
2021	European Indoor Championships	Toruń, Poland	22nd (sf)	60 m hurdles	7.87
