= Koen Smet =

Dutch hurdler

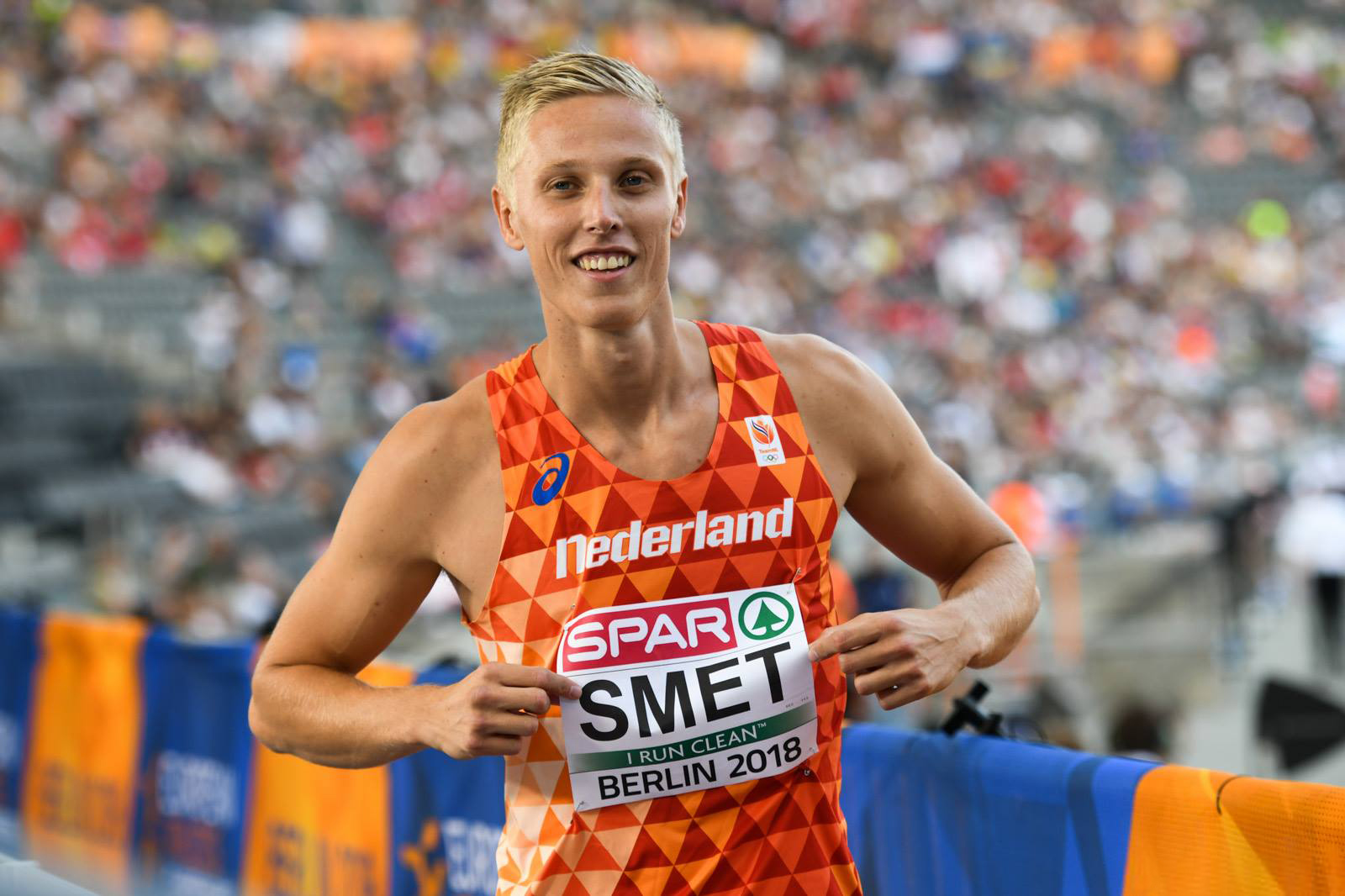
- Koen Smet in 2018

Personal information
- Born: 9 August 1992 (age 33) Amsterdam, Netherlands
- Education: VU University Amsterdam
- Height: 1.88 m (6 ft 2 in)
- Weight: 81 kg (179 lb)

Sport
- Sport: Athletics
- Event(s): 110 m hurdles, 60 m hurdles
- Club: Phanos
- Coached by: Guido Bonsen (2014–); Ineke Bonsen (2014–)

Koen Smet (Dutch: [kun ˈsmɛt]; born 9 August 1992) is a Dutch athlete specialising in the sprint hurdles. He won a silver medal at the 2013 European U23 Championships. In addition, he represented his country at two World Indoor Championships reaching the semifinals in 2018.

His personal bests are 13.53 seconds in the 110 metres hurdles (+0.7 m/s, Oordegem 2018) and 7.65 seconds in the 60 metres hurdles (Magglingen 2018).

== International competitions ==
Year	Competition	Venue	Position	Event	Notes
Representing the Netherlands
2011	European Junior Championships	Tallinn, Estonia	7th (sf)	110 m hurdles (99.0 cm)	13.92^{1}
2013	European Indoor Championships	Gothenburg, Sweden	21st (h)	60 m hurdles	7.86
2013	European U23 Championships	Tampere, Finland	2nd	110 m hurdles	13.58
2014	World Indoor Championships	Sopot, Poland	22nd (h)	60 m hurdles	7.80
2018	World Indoor Championships	Birmingham, United Kingdom	16th (sf)	60 m hurdles	7.69
2018	European Championships	Berlin, Germany	21st (sf)	110 m hurdles	13.71
2021	European Indoor Championships	Toruń, Poland	7th	60 m hurdles	7.73
2022	European Championships	Munich, Germany	23rd (sf)	110 m hurdles	14.06

^{1}Did not start in the final
