= Vitali Parakhonka =

Belarusian hurdler

Personal information
- Born: 18 August 1993 (age 32) Orsha

Sport
- Sport: Athletics
- Events: 110 m hurdles, 60 m hurdles
Medal record
Men's athletics
Representing Belarus
European Games
Silver medal – second place	2019 Minsk	110 m hurdles
Silver medal – second place	2019 Minsk	Team event

Vitali Alyaksandravich Parakhonka (Belarusian: Віталій Аляксандравіч Парахонька; born 18 August 1993) is a Belarusian athlete specialising in the sprint hurdles. He represented his country at the 2018 World Indoor Championships reaching the semifinals.

In 2019, he won the silver medal in the team event at the 2019 European Games held in Minsk, Belarus.

His personal bests are 13.40 seconds in the 110 metres hurdles (-1.0 m/s, Minsk 2018) and 7.70 seconds in the 60 metres hurdles (Mogilyov 2018).

== International competitions ==
Year	Competition	Venue	Position	Event	Notes
Representing Belarus
2012	World Junior Championships	Barcelona, Spain	51st (h)	110 m hurdles (99.0 cm)	14.47
2015	European Indoor Championships	Prague, Czech Republic	16th (h)	60 m hurdles	7.76
2015	European U23 Championships	Tallinn, Estonia	11th (h)	110 m hurdles	14.10
2017	European Indoor Championships	Belgrade, Serbia	–	60 m hurdles	DQ
2018	World Indoor Championships	Birmingham, United Kingdom	24th (sf)	60 m hurdles	8.00
2018	European Championships	Berlin, Germany	20th (sf)	110 m hurdles	13.69
2019	European Indoor Championships	Glasgow, United Kingdom	11th (sf)	60 m hurdles	7.72
2019	World Championships	Doha, Qatar	23rd (h)	110 m hurdles	13.65
2021	European Indoor Championships	Toruń, Poland	26th (h)	60 m hurdles	7.87
2021	Olympic Games	Tokyo, Japan	25th (h)	110 m hurdles	13.61
