= 2019 European Athletics Indoor Championships – Men's 60 metres hurdles =

The men's 60 metres hurdles event at the 2019 European Athletics Indoor Championships was held on 2 March 2019 at 12:02 (heats), and on 3 March 2019 at 11:05 (semifinals) and 18:10 (final) local time.

== Medalists ==
Gold	Silver	Bronze
Milan Trajkovic; Cyprus	Pascal Martinot-Lagarde; France	Aurel Manga; France

== Records ==
Standing records prior to the 2019 European Athletics Indoor Championships
World record	Colin Jackson (GBR)	7.30	Sindelfingen, Germany	6 March 1994
European record	Colin Jackson (GBR)	7.30	Sindelfingen, Germany	6 March 1994
Championship record	Colin Jackson (GBR)	7.39	Paris, France	12 March 1994
World Leading	Grant Holloway (USA)	7.43	Fayetteville, United States	8 February 2019
European Leading	Orlando Ortega (ESP)	7.49	Toruń, Poland	6 February 2019

== Results ==
=== Heats ===
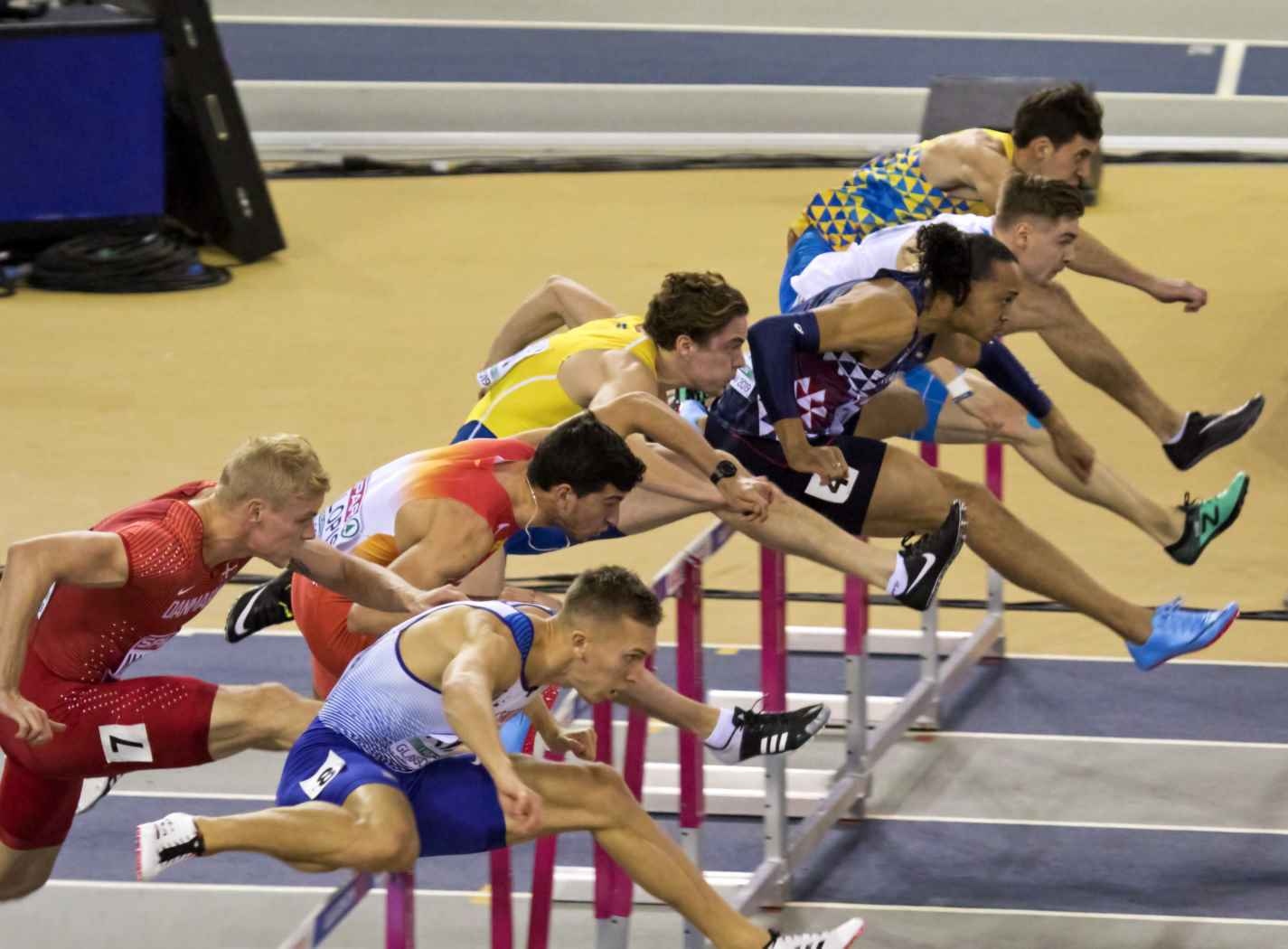
Heat 4

Qualification: First 3 in each heat (Q) and the next 6 fastest (q) advance to the Semi-Finals.

Rank	Heat	Athlete	Nationality	Time	Note
1	1	Orlando Ortega	Spain	7.61	Q
2	1	Andy Pozzi	Great Britain	7.62	Q, SB
3	4	Pascal Martinot-Lagarde	France	7.64	Q
4	2	Aurel Manga	France	7.64	Q
5	3	Milan Trajkovic	Cyprus	7.65	Q
6	4	Elmo Lakka	Finland	7.65	Q, PB
7	4	David King	Great Britain	7.66	Q
8	2	Konstadinos Douvalidis	Greece	7.69	Q, SB
8	3	Wilhem Belocian	France	7.69	Q
10	2	Valdó Szűcs	Hungary	7.69	Q, =PB
11	1	Lorenzo Perini	Italy	7.74	Q
12	3	Vitali Parakhonka	Belarus	7.79	Q
13	3	Damian Czykier	Poland	7.82	q
14	4	Anton Levin	Sweden	7.84	q
15	4	Enrique Llopis	Spain	7.85	q
16	4	Andreas Martinsen	Denmark	7.87	q
17	2	Fredrick Ekholm	Sweden	7.89	
18	3	Tobias Furer	Switzerland	7.90	
19	4	Artem Shamatryn	Ukraine	7.90	
20	3	Max Hrelja	Sweden	7.92	
21	1	Dominik Bochenek	Poland	7.92	
22	1	Brahian Peña	Switzerland	7.93	
23	3	Bohdan Chornomaz	Ukraine	7.94	
24	2	Filip Jakob Demšar	Slovenia	7.96	
25	2	Oleksiy Kasyanov	Ukraine	7.98	SB
26	2	Luca Trgovčević	Serbia	8.00	
27	3	Mikdat Sevler	Turkey	8.01	
28	1	Rasul Dabó	Portugal	8.03	
29	1	Kristaps Sietiņš	Latvia	8.05	
	2	Yidiel Contreras	Spain	DQ	R162.8

=== Semifinals ===
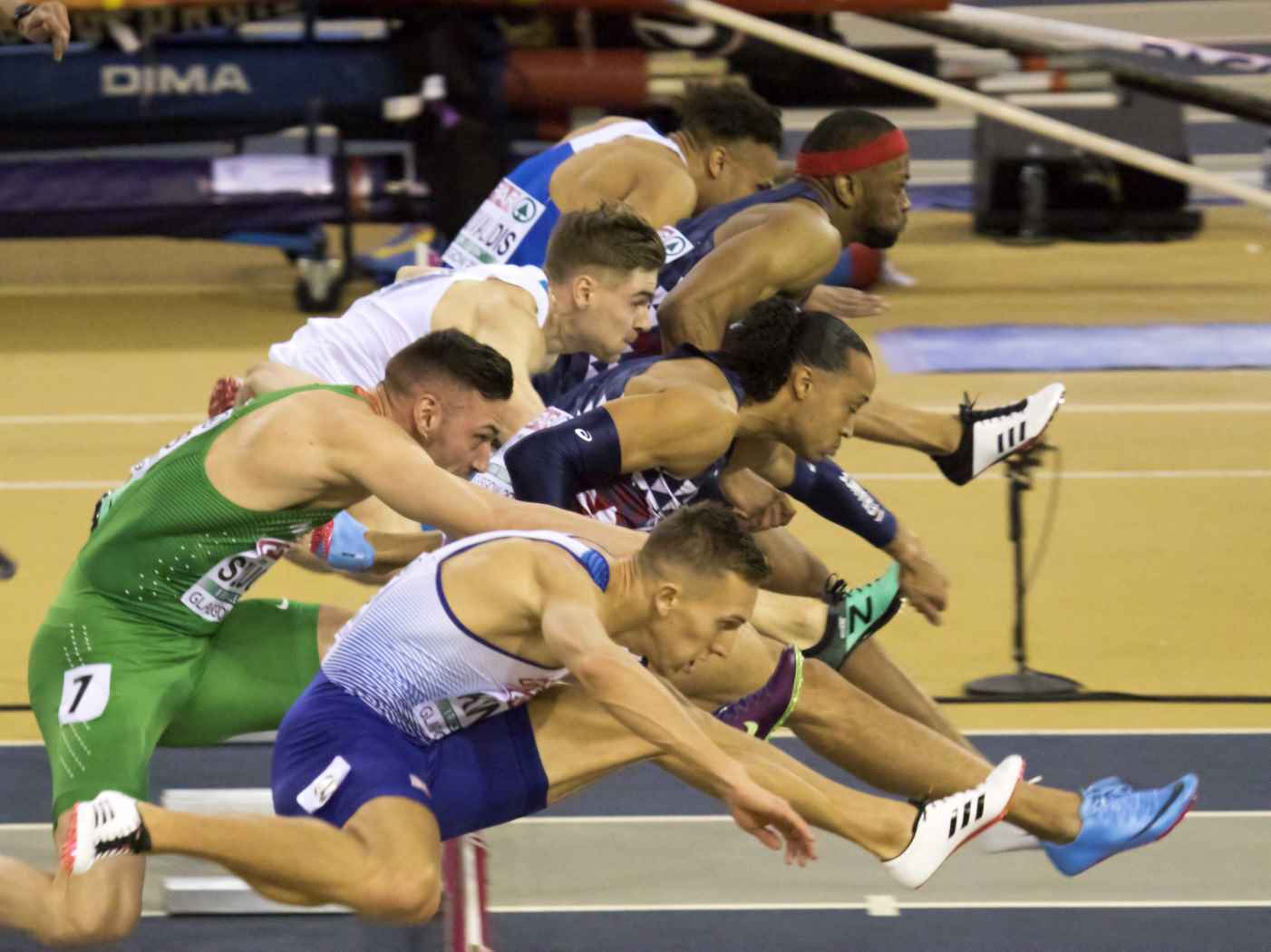
Semifinal 1

Qualification: Qualification: First 3 in each heat (Q) and the next 2 fastest (q) advance to the Final.

Rank	Heat	Athlete	Nationality	Time	Note
1	2	Orlando Ortega	Spain	7.57	Q
2	2	Andy Pozzi	Great Britain	7.61	Q, SB
3	1	Aurel Manga	France	7.63	Q
4	1	Pascal Martinot-Lagarde	France	7.64	Q
5	1	Konstadinos Douvalidis	Greece	7.66	Q, SB
6	2	Wilhem Belocian	France	7.66	Q
7	2	Milan Trajkovic	Cyprus	7.69	q
8	1	Elmo Lakka	Finland	7.70	q
9	2	Lorenzo Perini	Italy	7.70	
10	1	David King	Great Britain	7.71	
11	2	Vitali Parakhonka	Belarus	7.72	
12	1	Valdó Szűcs	Hungary	7.75	
13	2	Damian Czykier	Poland	7.77	
14	1	Enrique Llopis	Spain	7.87	
15	1	Anton Levin	Sweden	7.93	
16	2	Andreas Martinsen	Denmark	7.96	

=== Final ===
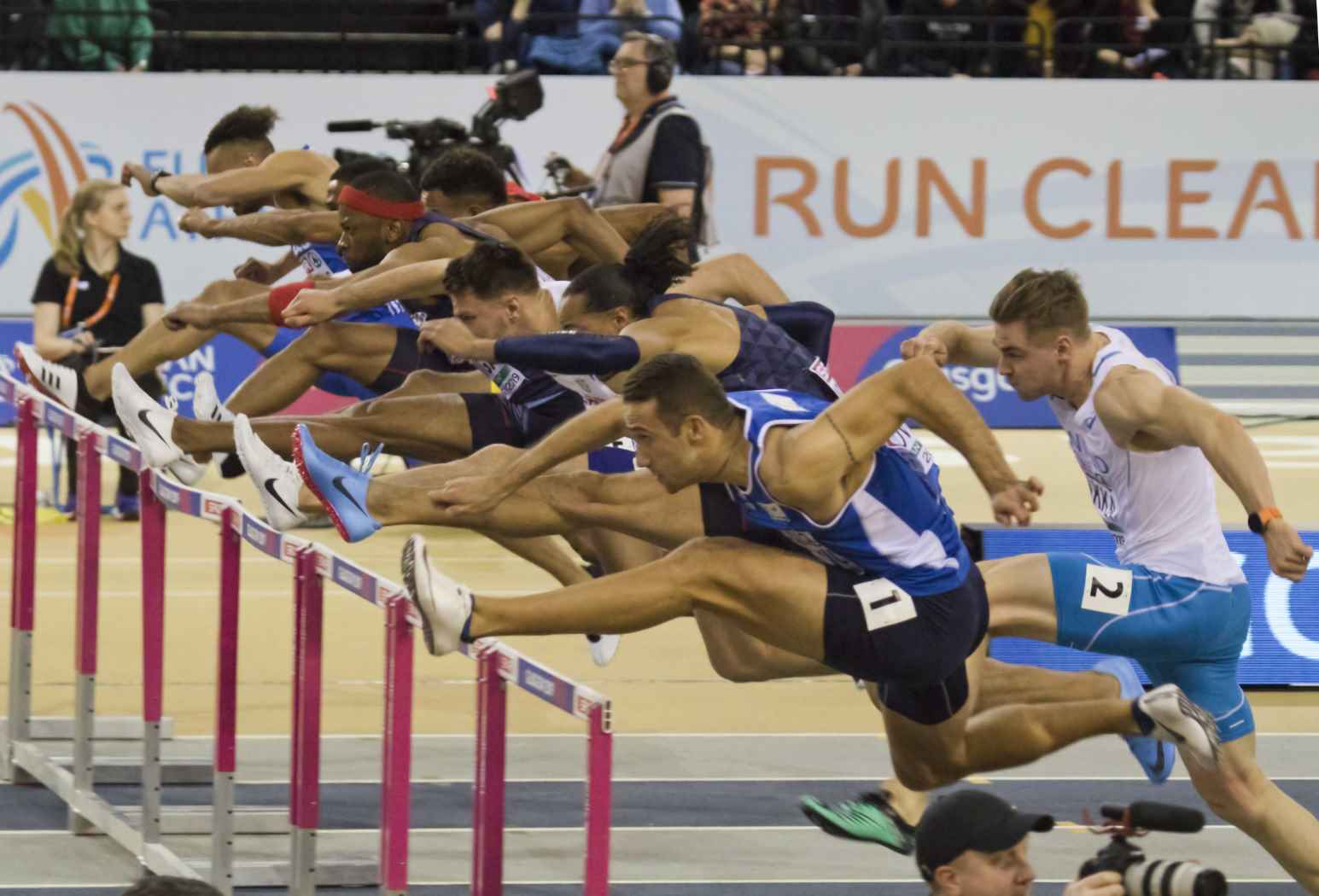
The final

Rank	Lane	Athlete	Nationality	Time	Note
1st place, gold medalist(s)	1	Milan Trajkovic	Cyprus	7.60	
2nd place, silver medalist(s)	3	Pascal Martinot-Lagarde	France	7.61	
3rd place, bronze medalist(s)	5	Aurel Manga	France	7.63	
4	6	Orlando Ortega	Spain	7.64	
5	8	Konstadinos Douvalidis	Greece	7.65	SB
6	4	Andy Pozzi	Great Britain	7.68	
7	7	Wilhem Belocian	France	7.68	
8	2	Elmo Lakka	Finland	7.74	
