= Franck Brice Koua =

Italian hurdler

Franck Koua
Personal information
- Full name: Franck Brice Koua
- National team: Italy (1 cap)
- Born: 21 September 2001 (age 24) Magenta, Italy
- Height: 1.94 m (6 ft 4 in)
- Weight: 93 kg (205 lb)

Sport
- Sport: Athletics
- Event: Hurdling
- Club: Cus Pro Patria Milano
- Coached by: Fiorella Colombo

Achievements and titles
- Personal bests: 110 m hs: 13.95 (2020); 60 m hs: 7.70 (2021)

Franck Brice Koua (born 21 September 2001) is an Italian hurdler.

Born and raised in the Milanese hinterland of Magenta (Mi), from parents from the Ivory Coast. After playing football he became passionate about athletics at school, thanks to a high jump lesson that at first became his specialty (personal of 2.04), without disdaining long and triple training with Fiorella Colombo in Bienate di Magnago (Milan), not far from Malpensa airport. Then a parenthesis in France where the family moved from the second half of 2017, to Villefranche-sur-Saône, followed by coach Pierre Berlier. As a student he tried the decathlon, so above all the obstacles with the call in blue for the U20 European Championships in 2019 and the choice to return to Italy alone, to stabilize himself with a relative in Vanzaghello. In 2020 he touched the Italian junior record of 60h indoor, making the MPN on 110hs with senior barriers (13.95). Surprisingly, in 2021 he won his first absolute tricolor indoor title, then conquering the final at the indoor European Championships as a freshman. He studies at the professional sports institute in Busto Arsizio. He is a lover of afro music and loves to dance to those beats.

== Career ==
His sporting explosion in the winter of 2021, when at the age of 19 he became the Italian indoor champion on the 60 m hs, Thus earning his first call-up to the national team for the 2021 European Indoor Championships.

== Achievements ==
Senior level

Year	Competition	Venue	Rank	Event	Performance	Notes
2021	European Indoor Championships	(Poland) Toruń	8th	60 m hs	7.76	PB

== National titles ==
Koua won a national championship.

- Italian Athletics Indoor Championships
  - 60 m hs: 2021
  - 110 m hs: 2021
