= Gallur =

- municipality
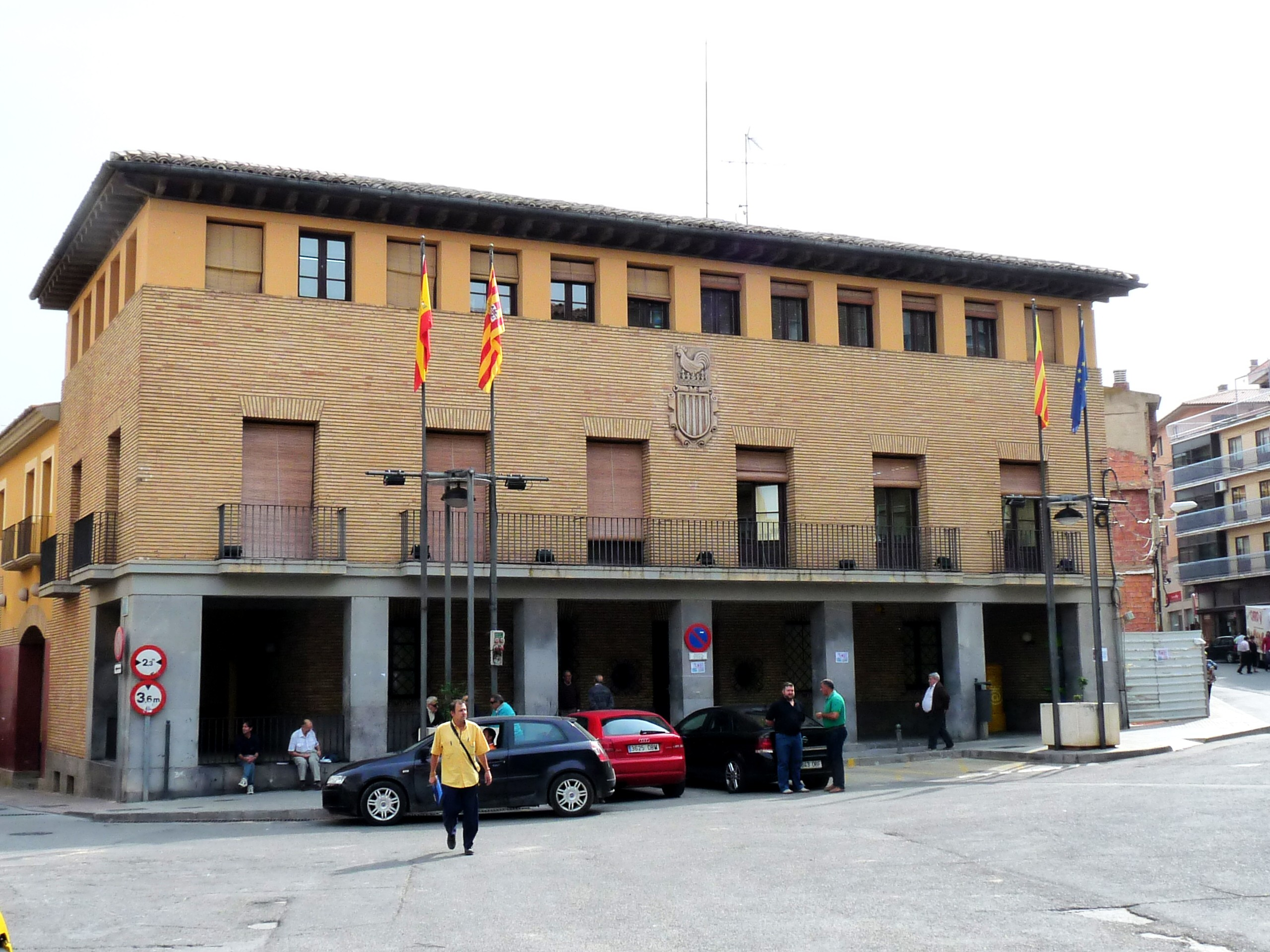

- Flag Coat of arms

- Location within Aragon Location within Spain Location within Europe
- Country: Spain
- Autonomous community: Aragon
- Province: Zaragoza

Population (2025-01-01)
  - Total: 2,642
- Time zone: UTC+1 (CET)
  - Summer (DST): UTC+2 (CEST)

Gallur (population 2,642) is a small town and municipality in the Spanish Autonomical Region of Aragón, province of Zaragoza. The town of Gallur is located on a plain which stretches from the West Bank until the Moncayo High River Ebro, in the so-called Somontano Moncayo, seated on the right bank.

== See also ==
- List of municipalities in Zaragoza
