= 1997 World Championships in Athletics – Men's 110 metres hurdles =

These are the official results of the Men's 110 metres hurdles event at the 1997 IAAF World Championships in Athens, Greece. There were a total number of 47 participating athletes, with two semi-finals, four quarter-finals and six qualifying heats and the final held on Thursday August 7, 1997.

== Medalists ==
Gold	Allen Johnson; United States (USA)
Silver	(United Kingdom) Colin Jackson; Great Britain (GBR)
Bronze	Igor Kováč; Slovakia (SVK)

== Final ==
RANK	FINAL	TIME
	Allen Johnson (USA)	12.93
	Colin Jackson (GBR)	13.05
	Igor Kováč (SVK)	13.18
4.	Florian Schwarthoff (GER)	13.20
5.	Dan Philibert (FRA)	13.26
6.	Terry Reese (USA)	13.30
7.	Mark Crear (USA)	13.55
—	Artur Kohutek (POL)	DNS

== Semi-finals ==
- Held on Wednesday 1997-08-06

RANK	HEAT 1	TIME
1.	Colin Jackson (GBR)	13.24
2.	Allen Johnson (USA)	13.31
3.	Igor Kováč (SVK)	13.38
4.	Terry Reese (USA)	13.45
5.	Robin Korving (NED)	13.51
6.	Vincent Clarico (FRA)	13.53
7.	Andrey Kislykh (RUS)	13.78
8.	Falk Balzer (GER)	14.06

RANK	HEAT 2	TIME
1.	Florian Schwarthoff (GER)	13.29
2.	Dan Philibert (FRA)	13.30
3.	Mark Crear (USA)	13.35
4.	Artur Kohutek (POL)	13.39
5.	Kyle Vander-Kuyp (AUS)	13.49
6.	Tony Jarrett (GBR)	13.50
7.	Jonathan N'Senga (BEL)	13.58
—	Anier García (CUB)	DNS

== Quarterfinals ==
- Held on Tuesday 1997-08-05

RANK	HEAT 1	TIME
1.	Mark Crear (USA)	13.15
2.	Colin Jackson (GBR)	13.19
3.	Robin Korving (NED)	13.44
4.	Mike Fenner (GER)	13.50
5.	Ronald Mehlich (POL)	13.51
6.	Sven Pieters (BEL)	13.55
7.	Sebastien Thibault (FRA)	13.62
8.	Jovesa Naivalu (FIJ)	14.04

RANK	HEAT 2	TIME
1.	Allen Johnson (USA)	13.22
2.	Artur Kohutek (POL)	13.27
3.	Dan Philibert (FRA)	13.33
4.	Falk Balzer (GER)	13.37
5.	Jonathan N'Senga (BEL)	13.50
6.	Stanislav Olijars (LAT)	13.62
7.	Andrew Tulloch (GBR)	13.63
8.	Gaute Melby Gundersen (NOR)	13.91

RANK	HEAT 3	TIME
1.	Tony Jarrett (GBR)	13.27
2.	Anier García (CUB)	13.46
3.	Kyle Vander-Kuyp (AUS)	13.53
4.	Reggie Torian (USA)	13.64
5.	Antti Haapakoski (FIN)	13.72
6.	Robert Kronberg (SWE)	13.73
7.	Pedro Chiamulera (BRA)	13.86
8.	Hubert Grossard (BEL)	14.01

RANK	HEAT 4	TIME
1.	Igor Kováč (SVK)	13.23
2.	Terry Reese (USA)	13.30
3.	Florian Schwarthoff (GER)	13.30
4.	Vincent Clarico (FRA)	13.41
5.	Andrey Kislykh (RUS)	13.43
6.	Guntis Peders (LAT)	13.55
7.	Elmar Lichtenegger (AUT)	13.70
8.	Tomasz Ścigaczewski (POL)	13.73

== Qualifying heats ==
- Held on Tuesday 1997-08-05

RANK	HEAT 1	TIME
1.	Dan Philibert (FRA)	13.43
2.	Allen Johnson (USA)	13.52
3.	Robert Kronberg (SWE)	13.70
4.	Robin Korving (NED)	13.80
5.	Gaute Melby Gundersen (NOR)	13.83
6.	Stamatis Magos (GRE)	13.92
–	Zhivko Videnov (BUL)	DQ

RANK	HEAT 2	TIME
1.	Artur Kohutek (POL)	13.37
2.	Anier García (CUB)	13.46
3.	Andrew Tulloch (GBR)	13.69
4.	Falk Balzer (GER)	13.70
5.	Hubert Grossard (BEL)	13.74
6.	Terry Reese (USA)	13.79
7.	Wagner Marseille (HAI)	14.52
–	Andrey Sklyarenko (KAZ)	DNS

RANK	HEAT 3	TIME
1.	Igor Kováč (SVK)	13.36
2.	Sebastien Thibault (FRA)	13.50
3.	Tomasz Ścigaczewski (POL)	13.61
4.	Andrey Kislykh (RUS)	13.67
5.	Stanislav Olijars (LAT)	13.79
6.	Li Tong (CHN)	13.89
7.	Avele Tanielu (SAM)	14.59
–	Emilio Valle (CUB)	DNF

RANK	HEAT 4	TIME
1.	Tony Jarrett (GBR)	13.35
2.	Vincent Clarico (FRA)	13.51
3.	Ronald Mehlich (POL)	13.65
4.	Mike Fenner (GER)	13.67
5.	Sven Pieters (BEL)	13.67
6.	Hisanobu Konae (JPN)	14.02
7.	Slavoljub Nikolić (SCG)	14.26
8.	Min Tun Min (MYA)	15.58

RANK	HEAT 5	TIME
1.	Florian Schwarthoff (GER)	13.44
2.	Reggie Torian (USA)	13.51
3.	Kyle Vander-Kuyp (AUS)	13.61
4.	Guntis Peders (LAT)	13.73
5.	Pedro Chiamulera (BRA)	13.93
6.	Peter Coghlan (IRL)	13.94
7.	William Erese (NGR)	13.95
8.	Si Mohamed Boukrouna (MAR)	14.22

RANK	HEAT 6	TIME
1.	Colin Jackson (GBR)	13.19
2.	Mark Crear (USA)	13.46
3.	Jonathan N'Senga (BEL)	13.53
4.	Antti Haapakoski (FIN)	13.75
5.	Elmar Lichtenegger (AUT)	13.78
6.	Jovesa Naivalu (FIJ)	13.82
7.	Levente Csillag (HUN)	13.96
8.	Blaz Korent (SLO)	14.20

== See also ==
- 1995 Men's World Championships 110m Hurdles (Gothenburg)
- 1996 Men's Olympic 110m Hurdles (Atlanta)
- 1998 Men's European Championships 110m Hurdles (Budapest)
- 1999 Men's World Championships 110m Hurdles (Seville)
- 2000 Men's Olympic 110m Hurdles (Sydney)
