= Athletics at the 1993 Summer Universiade – Men's 110 metres hurdles =

The men's 110 metres hurdles event at the 1993 Summer Universiade was held at the UB Stadium in Buffalo, United States on 16, 17 and 18 July 1993.

== Medalists ==
Gold	Silver	Bronze
Dietmar Koszewski; Germany	Glenn Terry; United States	Stelios Bisbas; Greece

== Results ==
=== Heats ===
Wind:
Heat 1: ? m/s, Heat 2: ? m/s, Heat 3: +1.9 m/s, Heat 4: +3.9 m/s

Rank	Heat	Athlete	Nationality	Time	Notes
1	1	Larry Harrington Jr.	United States	13.69	Q
2	1	Ronald Mehlich	Poland	14.02	Q
3	1	Gaute Melby Gundersen	Norway	14.07	Q
4	1	Chen Chin-hsiung	Chinese Taipei	14.28	q
5	1	Juha Laaksonen	Finland	14.31	
6	1	Andrey Gutov	Kazakhstan	14.67	
1	2	Dietmar Koszewski	Germany	13.54	Q
2	2	Tim Kroeker	Canada	13.64	Q
3	2	Guntis Peders	Latvia	13.74	Q
5	2	Mathieu Gouanou	Republic of the Congo	14.72	
6	2	Jonathan Nsenga	Belgium	15.12	
7	2	K. Manivannan	Sri Lanka	17.34	
1	3	Glenn Terry	United States	13.35	Q
2	3	Evgeny Pechonkin	Russia	13.98	Q
3	3	Antonio Lanau	Spain	14.13	Q
4	3	Neil Owen	Great Britain	14.15	q
5	3	Miguel Soto	Puerto Rico	14.30	
6	3	Marco Mina	Peru	14.79	
7	3	Mauricio Carranza	El Salvador	15.68	
1	4	Stelios Bisbas	Greece	13.64	Q
2	4	Igor Kovač	Slovakia	13.99	Q
3	4	Gunnar Schrör	Switzerland	14.02	Q
4	4	Emmanuel Romary	France	14.05	q
5	4	Erik Ulvness	Norway	14.29	q
6	4	Manuel Feliciano	Puerto Rico	15.30	

=== Semifinals ===
Wind:
Heat 1: +1.9 m/s. Heat 2: +2.4 m/s

Rank	Heat	Athlete	Nationality	Time	Notes
1	2	Glenn Terry	United States	13.24	Q
2	1	Dietmar Koszewski	Germany	13.44	Q
3	2	Tim Kroeker	Canada	13.65	Q
4	1	Larry Harrington Jr.	United States	13.68	Q
5	1	Stelios Bisbas	Greece	13.68	Q
6	2	Guntis Peders	Latvia	13.72	Q
7	1	Igor Kovač	Slovakia	13.74	Q
8	2	Evgeny Pechonkin	Russia	13.76	Q
9	2	Ronald Mehlich	Poland	13.83	
10	2	Emmanuel Romary	France	14.03	
11	1	Neil Owen	Great Britain	14.12	
12	1	Gunnar Schrör	Switzerland	14.15	
13	2	Erik Ulvness	Norway	14.22	
14	1	Chen Chin-hsiung	Chinese Taipei	14.46	
15	1	Gaute Melby Gundersen	Norway	14.60	
16	2	Antonio Lanau	Spain	14.87	

=== Final ===
Wind: +1.9 m/s

Rank	Lane	Athlete	Nationality	Time	Notes
1st place, gold medalist(s)	3	Dietmar Koszewski	Germany	13.48	
2nd place, silver medalist(s)	5	Glenn Terry	United States	13.58	
3rd place, bronze medalist(s)	2	Stelios Bisbas	Greece	13.72	
4	4	Tim Kroeker	Canada	13.73	
5	7	Evgeny Pechonkin	Russia	13.74	
6	6	Larry Harrington Jr.	United States	13.79	
7	8	Guntis Peders	Latvia	14.17	
	1	Igor Kovač	Slovakia	DNS	
