= Athletics at the 1991 Summer Universiade – Men's 110 metres hurdles =

The men's 110 metres hurdles event at the 1991 Summer Universiade was held at the Don Valley Stadium in Sheffield on 23, 24 and 25 July 1991.

== Medalists ==
Gold	Silver	Bronze
Elbert Ellis; United States	Jerry Roney; United States	Dmitriy Buldov; Soviet Union

== Results ==
=== Heats ===
Wind:
Heat 1: +2.0 m/s, Heat 2: +2.9 m/s, Heat 3: +1.8 m/s, Heat 4: +3.1 m/s

Rank	Heat	Athlete	Nationality	Time	Notes
1	4	Li Tong	China	13.63	Q
2	4	Elbert Ellis	United States	13.67	Q
3	1	Igor Kováč	Czechoslovakia	13.77	Q
4	2	Jerry Roney	United States	13.81	Q
5	1	Gennadiy Dakshevich	Soviet Union	13.85	Q
6	4	Emmanuel Romary	France	13.89	Q
7	2	Dmitriy Buldov	Soviet Union	13.96	Q
8	4	Tim Kroeker	Canada	14.00	q
9	1	Helge Bormann	Germany	14.03	Q
10	2	Judex Lefou	Mauritius	14.06	Q
11	1	Hisanobu Konae	Japan	14.12	q
12	1	Thomas Zurlinden	Switzerland	14.13	q
12	3	Wiegert Thunnissen	Netherlands	14.13	Q
14	2	Zheng Jinsuo	China	14.18	q
15	3	Marco Todeschini	Italy	14.21	Q
15	4	Ruhan Işım	Turkey	14.21	
17	1	Colin Grant	Canada	14.29	
18	2	Gunnar Schrör	Switzerland	14.44	
19	3	Brett St. Louis	Great Britain	14.50	Q
20	4	Hamdi Jafaar	Malaysia	14.52	
21	2	Gaute Melby Gundersen	Norway	14.53	
22	3	Mathieu Gouanou	Ivory Coast	14.54	
22	4	Erik Ulvness	Norway	14.54	
24	2	Benjamin Grant	Sierra Leone	14.93	
25	1	Masoud Mahroubi	Iran	15.27	
26	1	Lam Wai Keung	Hong Kong	15.77	
27	2	Ranil Jayanetti	Sri Lanka	16.94	
28	3	Jean Massif	France	26.47	q
	3	Antonio Lanau	Spain	DNF	

=== Semifinals ===
Wind:
Heat 1: +1.0 m/s, Heat 2: +1.1 m/s

Rank	Heat	Athlete	Nationality	Time	Notes
1	1	Li Tong	China	13.72	Q
2	1	Jerry Roney	United States	13.77	Q
3	2	Dmitriy Buldov	Soviet Union	13.86	Q
4	2	Elbert Ellis	United States	13.88	Q
5	1	Igor Kováč	Czechoslovakia	13.90	Q
6	1	Gennadiy Dakshevich	Soviet Union	13.96	Q
7	1	Helge Bormann	Germany	14.06	
8	1	Judex Lefou	Mauritius	14.07	
9	2	Emmanuel Romary	France	14.09	Q
10	1	Hisanobu Konae	Japan	14.17	
11	2	Zheng Jinsuo	China	14.17	Q
12	2	Marco Todeschini	Italy	14.20	
13	2	Brett St. Louis	Great Britain	14.53	
14	1	Jean Massif	France	14.69	
15	1	Thomas Zurlinden	Switzerland	15.01	
	2	Wiegert Thunnissen	Netherlands	DNF	q
	2	Tim Kroeker	Canada	DNF	

=== Final ===
Wind: +1.0 m/s

Rank	Athlete	Nationality	Time	Notes
1st place, gold medalist(s)	Elbert Ellis	United States	13.83	
2nd place, silver medalist(s)	Jerry Roney	United States	13.83	
3rd place, bronze medalist(s)	Dmitriy Buldov	Soviet Union	13.85	
4	Igor Kováč	Czechoslovakia	13.87	
5	Emmanuel Romary	France	14.06	
6	Zheng Jinsuo	China	14.29	
7	Wiegert Thunnissen	Netherlands	14.37	
8	Gennadiy Dakshevich	Soviet Union	14.55	
	Li Tong	China	DNF	
