= 1997 IAAF World Indoor Championships – Men's 60 metres hurdles =

The men's 60 metres hurdles event at the 1997 IAAF World Indoor Championships was held on March 8–9.

== Doping disqualification ==
Jonathan N'Senga of Belgium originally qualified for the final and finished 6th, but was later disqualified for doping.

== Medalists ==
Gold	Silver	Bronze
Anier García; Cuba	Colin Jackson; Great Britain	Tony Dees; United States

== Results ==
=== Heats ===
The first 2 of each heat (Q) and next 2 fastest (q) qualified for the semifinals.

Rank	Heat	Name	Nationality	Time	Notes
1	2	Colin Jackson	Great Britain	7.52	Q
2	5	Tony Dees	United States	7.56	Q
3	4	Duane Ross	United States	7.57	Q
4	3	Anier García	Cuba	7.61	Q
	2	Jonathan N'Senga	Belgium	DQ (7.61)	Q
5	5	Andrey Kislykh	Russia	7.67	Q, PB
6	1	Falk Balzer	Germany	7.68	Q
6	4	Igor Kováč	Slovakia	7.68	Q
8	1	Li Tong	China	7.70	Q
8	5	Chen Yanhao	China	7.70	q
10	4	Philippe Lamine	France	7.71	q
10	5	Mike Fenner	Germany	7.71	
12	2	Sébastien Thibault	France	7.72	SB
12	3	Ronald Mehlich	Poland	7.72	Q
14	3	Kyle Vander Kuyp	Australia	7.73	=AR
15	5	Antti Haapakoski	Finland	7.74	
16	3	Johan Lisabeth	Belgium	7.75	PB
17	1	Robert Foster	Jamaica	7.77	
18	1	Robert Kronberg	Sweden	7.79	PB
19	1	Robin Korving	Netherlands	7.80	
20	3	Carlos Sala	Spain	7.81	
21	4	Andrea Putignani	Italy	7.85	
22	1	Igors Kazanovs	Latvia	7.86	
23	2	Krzysztof Mehlich	Poland	7.87	
24	5	Gaute Gundersen	Norway	7.88	
25	4	Dmitriy Kolesnichenko	Ukraine	7.94	
26	3	Pedro Chiamulera	Brazil	7.96	AR
26	4	Damien Greaves	Great Britain	7.96	
28	2	Mauro Rossi	Italy	7.98	

=== Semifinals ===
First 3 of each semifinal (Q) qualified directly for the final.

Rank	Heat	Name	Nationality	Time	Notes
1	1	Colin Jackson	Great Britain	7.51	Q
1	2	Tony Dees	United States	7.51	Q, SB
1	2	Anier García	Cuba	7.51	Q
4	1	Duane Ross	United States	7.57	Q
	2	Jonathan N'Senga	Belgium	DQ (7.60)	Q
5	1	Igor Kováč	Slovakia	7.62	Q, SB
6	1	Falk Balzer	Germany	7.68	
7	1	Li Tong	China	7.72	
7	2	Chen Yanhao	China	7.72	
9	2	Andrey Kislykh	Russia	7.74	
10	1	Philippe Lamine	France	7.76	
10	2	Ronald Mehlich	Poland	7.76	

=== Final ===
Rank	Lane	Name	Nationality	Time	Notes
1st place, gold medalist(s)	3	Anier García	Cuba	7.48	=NR
2nd place, silver medalist(s)	5	Colin Jackson	Great Britain	7.49	
3rd place, bronze medalist(s)	4	Tony Dees	United States	7.50	SB
4	6	Duane Ross	United States	7.54	
5	1	Igor Kováč	Slovakia	7.59	NR
(6)	2	Jonathan N'Senga	Belgium	DQ (7.71)	Doping
