= Athletics at the 1995 Summer Universiade – Men's 110 metres hurdles =

The men's 110 metres hurdles event at the 1995 Summer Universiade was held on 29–30 August at the Hakatanomori Athletic Stadium in Fukuoka, Japan.

== Medalists ==
Gold	Silver	Bronze
Jonathan Nsenga; Belgium	Brian Amos; United States	Krzysztof Mehlich; Poland

== Results ==
=== Heats ===
Qualification: First 4 of each heat (Q) and the next 4 fastest qualified for the quarterfinals.

Wind:
Heat 1: -0.1 m/s, Heat 2: -0.2 m/s, Heat 3: -2.0 m/s, Heat 4: -1.0 m/s, Heat 5: -2.2 m/s

Rank	Heat	Athlete	Nationality	Time	Notes
1	1	Jonathan Nsenga	Belgium	13.61	Q
2	4	Brian Amos	United States	13.75	Q
3	2	Kehinde Aladefa	Nigeria	13.82	Q
4	2	Frank Asselman	Belgium	13.86	Q
5	2	Dmitriy Kolesnichenko	Ukraine	13.91	Q
6	1	Wagner Marseille	Haiti	13.98	Q
7	2	Robin Korving	Netherlands	14.01	Q
8	3	Krzysztof Mehlich	Poland	14.02	Q
9	5	Stelios Bisbas	Greece	14.05	Q
10	3	Gunnar Schrör	Switzerland	14.09	Q
11	5	Randolph Ross	United States	14.10	Q
12	1	Takashi Ichikawa	Japan	14.13	Q
12	3	Falk Balzer	Germany	14.13	Q
14	2	Raphael Monachon	Switzerland	14.17	q
15	3	Neil Owen	Great Britain	14.26	Q
16	1	William Erese	Nigeria	14.36	Q
17	4	Stamatis Magos	Greece	14.38	Q
18	5	Emmanuel Romary	France	14.42	Q
19	1	Miguel Santos	Spain	14.45	q
20	4	Lee Jung-ho	South Korea	14.46	Q
21	2	Hakim Mazou	Republic of the Congo	14.48	q
22	4	Zheng Jinsuo	China	14.63	Q
23	3	Mário Reis	Portugal	14.64	q
24	3	Yevgeniy Shorokhov	Kyrgyzstan	14.79	
24	5	Masanori Inoue	Japan	14.79	Q
26	4	Collin Lewis	Canada	14.93	
27	5	François du Toit	South Africa	15.11	
28	4	Nick Bolton	New Zealand	15.14	
29	5	Avele Tanielu	Western Samoa	15.24	
30	3	Michael Koppang	Canada	15.41	
31	5	Liam Whaley	New Zealand	15.89	
32	2	Sampath Sujeeva	Sri Lanka	16.50	
33	1	Rashid Qureshi	Pakistan	17.51	
	1	Fine Fua	Tonga	DNF	
	4	Ronald Mehlich	Poland	DNF	

=== Quarterfinals ===
Qualification: First 4 of each heat (Q) and the next 4 fastest (q) qualified for the semifinals.

Wind:
Heat 1: -1.3 m/s, Heat 2: -0.6 m/s, Heat 3: -1.1 m/s

Rank	Heat	Athlete	Nationality	Time	Notes
1	1	Jonathan Nsenga	Belgium	13.58	Q
2	2	Brian Amos	United States	13.65	Q
3	1	Dmitriy Kolesnichenko	Ukraine	13.74	Q
4	1	Falk Balzer	Germany	13.76	Q
5	2	Frank Asselman	Belgium	13.82	Q
6	3	Krzysztof Mehlich	Poland	13.83	Q
7	3	Kehinde Aladefa	Nigeria	13.85	Q
8	3	Randolph Ross	United States	13.86	Q
9	2	Neil Owen	Great Britain	13.89	Q
10	2	Stelios Bisbas	Greece	13.91	Q
11	1	William Erese	Nigeria	14.02	Q
12	2	Emmanuel Romary	France	14.04	q
13	1	Wagner Marseille	Haiti	14.05	q
14	2	Gunnar Schrör	Switzerland	14.08	q
14	3	Robin Korving	Netherlands	14.08	Q
16	1	Takashi Ichikawa	Japan	14.20	q
17	3	Raphael Monachon	Switzerland	14.22	
18	3	Lee Jung-ho	South Korea	14.25	
19	2	Masanori Inoue	Japan	14.30	
20	3	Miguel Santos	Spain	14.35	
21	3	Stamatis Magos	Greece	14.36	
22	2	Hakim Mazou	Republic of the Congo	14.41	
23	1	Mário Reis	Portugal	14.67	
24	1	Zheng Jinsuo	China	14.68	

=== Semifinals ===
Qualification: First 4 of each semifinal qualified directly (Q) for the final.

Wind:
Heat 1: -0.1 m/s, Heat 2: +0.4 m/s

Rank	Heat	Athlete	Nationality	Time	Notes
1	1	Brian Amos	United States	13.60	Q
2	2	Jonathan Nsenga	Belgium	13.71	Q
3	1	Falk Balzer	Germany	13.72	Q
4	1	Kehinde Aladefa	Nigeria	13.78	Q
5	2	Krzysztof Mehlich	Poland	13.80	Q
6	2	Dmitriy Kolesnichenko	Ukraine	13.85	Q
7	2	Neil Owen	Great Britain	13.85	Q
8	1	Wagner Marseille	Haiti	13.87	Q
8	1	Frank Asselman	Belgium	13.87	
10	2	Randolph Ross	United States	13.95	
11	2	Robin Korving	Netherlands	13.97	
12	1	Emmanuel Romary	France	13.98	
13	1	Gunnar Schrör	Switzerland	13.99	
13	2	William Erese	Nigeria	13.99	
15	2	Takashi Ichikawa	Japan	14.18	
	1	Stelios Bisbas	Greece	DNS	

=== Final ===
Wind: +0.4 m/s

Rank	Lane	Athlete	Nationality	Time	Notes
1st place, gold medalist(s)	5	Jonathan Nsenga	Belgium	13.51	
2nd place, silver medalist(s)	4	Brian Amos	United States	13.59	
3rd place, bronze medalist(s)	6	Krzysztof Mehlich	Poland	13.66	
4	1	Dmitriy Kolesnichenko	Ukraine	13.67	
5	7	Neil Owen	Great Britain	13.72	
6	3	Falk Balzer	Germany	13.77	
7	8	Wagner Marseille	Haiti	13.78	
8	2	Kehinde Aladefa	Nigeria	14.41	
