= Masters M35 110 metres hurdles world record progression =

This is the progression of world record improvements of the 110 metres hurdles M35 division of Masters athletics.

Key

Incomplete information Wind aided Pending

Hand	Auto	Wind	Athlete	Nationality	Birthdate	Location	Date
	12.96	0.4	Allen Johnson	United States	01.03.1971	Athens	17.09.2006
	13.11	0.4	Colin Jackson	United Kingdom	18.02.1967	Munich	10.08.2002
	13.22	1.0	Tony Dees	United States	06.08.1963	Sevilla	25.08.1999
	13.26	-0.3	Greg Foster	United States	04.08.1958	Oslo	22.07.1994
	14.01		James McCraney	United States	28.03.1955	Norwalk	22.06.1991
	14.13		Sergio Liani	Italy	03.08.1943	Viareggio	09.08.1978
14.9			John Dobroth	United States			
14.1			Ghulam Razik	Pakistan	11.11.1932	Rawalpindi	16.02.1969

Note: Allen Johnson's mark was over 42" (1.067 meters) tall sprint hurdles which were the Masters specification at the time of the mark.
