= 1995 IAAF World Indoor Championships – Men's 60 metres hurdles =

The men's 60 metres hurdles event at the 1995 IAAF World Indoor Championships was held on 11–12 March.

== Medalists ==
Gold	Silver	Bronze
Allen Johnson; United States	Courtney Hawkins; United States	Tony Jarrett; Great Britain

== Results ==
=== Heats ===
First 2 of each heat (Q) and next 4 fastest (q) qualified for the semifinals.

Rank	Heat	Name	Nationality	Time	Notes
1	6	Tony Jarrett	Great Britain	7.58	Q
2	5	Courtney Hawkins	United States	7.62	Q
3	6	Antti Haapakoski	Finland	7.65	Q
4	1	Li Tong	China	7.66	Q
4	3	Allen Johnson	United States	7.66	Q
6	2	Frank Busemann	Germany	7.67	Q
6	4	Mark McKoy	Austria	7.67	Q
8	3	Gheorghe Boroi	Romania	7.73	Q
9	5	Erik Batte	Cuba	7.74	Q
9	6	Kyle Vander Kuyp	Australia	7.74	q
11	1	Yevgeniy Pechonkin	Russia	7.75	Q
11	4	Jyrki Kähkönen	Finland	7.75	Q
11	5	Igor Kováč	Slovakia	7.75	q
14	1	Emilio Valle	Cuba	7.76	q
15	2	Antonio Lanau	Spain	7.78	Q
16	1	Ronald Mehlich	Poland	7.79	q
17	2	Igors Kazanovs	Latvia	7.80	
17	4	Sven Göhler	Germany	7.80	
19	4	Carlos Sala	Spain	7.82	
20	2	Jiří Hudec	Czech Republic	7.84	
20	6	Artur Kohutek	Poland	7.84	
22	1	Gaute Gundersen	Norway	7.85	
23	1	Sébastien Thibault	France	7.86	
24	1	Johan Lisabeth	Belgium	7.88	
24	5	Niklas Eriksson	Sweden	7.88	
26	3	Tim Kroeker	Canada	7.89	
27	2	Chen Yanhao	China	7.91	
28	6	Wagner Marseille	Haiti	7.92	
29	6	Jonathan N'Senga	Belgium	7.93	
30	3	Miguel Soto	Puerto Rico	7.96	
30	5	Christian Maislinger	Austria	7.96	
32	4	Aleksandr Yenko	Moldova	7.97	
33	4	Brian Taylor	Great Britain	8.00	
34	5	Nur Herman Majid	Malaysia	8.03	
35	3	Hakim Mazou	Republic of the Congo	8.07	
36	6	Mohamed Mohamed Samy	Egypt	8.09	
37	4	Yevgeniy Shorokhov	Kyrgyzstan	8.10	
	5	William Fong	Western Samoa	DQ	R162.7
	2	Muhamed Amin	Pakistan	DNS	
	2	Robert Tupuhoé	French Polynesia	DNS	
	3	Modesto Castillo	Dominican Republic	DNS	
	3	T.J. Kearns	Ireland	DNS	

=== Semifinals ===
First 4 of each semifinal qualified directly (Q) for the final.

Rank	Heat	Name	Nationality	Time	Notes
1	1	Allen Johnson	United States	7.41	Q, CR
2	1	Tony Jarrett	Great Britain	7.46	Q
2	2	Mark McKoy	Austria	7.46	Q
2	2	Courtney Hawkins	United States	7.46	Q
5	2	Emilio Valle	Cuba	7.61	Q
6	1	Frank Busemann	Germany	7.63	Q
7	2	Antti Haapakoski	Finland	7.65	Q
8	2	Li Tong	China	7.66	
9	2	Yevgeniy Pechonkin	Russia	7.72	
10	1	Kyle Vander Kuyp	Australia	7.73	Q
11	1	Jyrki Kähkönen	Finland	7.73	
12	2	Igor Kováč	Slovakia	7.75	
13	2	Antonio Lanau	Spain	7.79	
14	1	Erik Batte	Cuba	7.83	
15	1	Ronald Mehlich	Poland	7.84	
16	1	Gheorghe Boroi	Romania	7.89	

=== Final ===
Rank	Lane	Name	Nationality	Time	Notes
1st place, gold medalist(s)	5	Allen Johnson	United States	7.39	CR
2nd place, silver medalist(s)	3	Courtney Hawkins	United States	7.41	
3rd place, bronze medalist(s)	6	Tony Jarrett	Great Britain	7.42	
4	4	Mark McKoy	Austria	7.46	
5	7	Emilio Valle	Cuba	7.67	
6	2	Antti Haapakoski	Finland	7.70	
7	8	Frank Busemann	Germany	7.70	
8	1	Kyle Vander Kuyp	Australia	7.73	
