= 1999 IAAF World Indoor Championships – Men's 60 metres hurdles =

The men's 60 metres hurdles event at the 1999 IAAF World Indoor Championships was held on March 5.

== Medalists ==
Gold	Silver	Bronze
Colin Jackson; Great Britain	Reggie Torian; United States	Falk Balzer; Germany

== Results ==
=== Heats ===
First 2 of each heat (Q) and next 12 fastest (q) qualified for the semifinals.

Rank	Heat	Name	Nationality	Time	Notes
1	2	Colin Jackson	Great Britain	7.42	Q, SB
2	2	Reggie Torian	United States	7.43	Q
3	1	Duane Ross	United States	7.51	Q
3	3	Tomasz Ścigaczewski	Poland	7.51	Q, NR
5	3	Anier García	Cuba	7.53	Q, SB
6	3	Elmar Lichtenegger	Austria	7.54	q, PB
7	3	Falk Balzer	Germany	7.57	q
8	1	Igor Kováč	Slovakia	7.59	Q
9	1	Mike Fenner	Germany	7.59	
10	1	Krzysztof Mehlich	Poland	7.65	
11	3	Peter Coghlan	Ireland	7.66	
12	2	Emiliano Pizzoli	Italy	7.67	SB
13	1	Ross Baillie	Great Britain	7.69	
13	2	Igors Kazanovs	Latvia	7.69	
15	2	Raphaël Monachon	Switzerland	7.75	SB
16	1	Kenichi Sakurai	Japan	7.83	
17	2	Damjan Zlatnar	Slovenia	7.85	
18	3	Baimourad Achirmouradov	Turkmenistan	8.47	
19	3	Esteve Martín	Andorra	8.57	
	1	Jabur Haydar	Iraq	DNS	

=== Final ===
Rank	Lane	Name	Nationality	Time	Notes
1st place, gold medalist(s)	5	Colin Jackson	Great Britain	7.38	CR
2nd place, silver medalist(s)	6	Reggie Torian	United States	7.40	
3rd place, bronze medalist(s)	1	Falk Balzer	Germany	7.44	
4	3	Duane Ross	United States	7.50	
5	4	Tomasz Ścigaczewski	Poland	7.52	
6	7	Anier García	Cuba	7.59	
7	2	Elmar Lichtenegger	Austria	7.69	
8	8	Igor Kováč	Slovakia	7.81	
