= 1993 IAAF World Indoor Championships – Men's 60 metres hurdles =

The men's 60 metres hurdles event at the 1993 IAAF World Indoor Championships was held on 13 March.

== Medalists ==
Gold	Silver	Bronze
Mark McKoy; Canada	Colin Jackson; Great Britain	Tony Dees; United States

== Results ==
=== Heats ===
First 3 of each heat (Q) and next 4 fastest (q) qualified for the semifinals.

Rank	Heat	Name	Nationality	Time	Notes
1	2	Colin Jackson	Great Britain	7.49	Q
2	3	Mark McKoy	Canada	7.55	Q
3	1	Tony Dees	United States	7.56	Q
4	4	Florian Schwarthoff	Germany	7.65	Q
5	1	Li Tong	China	7.70	Q, AR
6	3	Sergey Usov	Belarus	7.71	Q
7	4	Emilio Valle	Cuba	7.72	Q
8	4	Igors Kazanovs	Latvia	7.73	Q
9	2	George Boroi	Romania	7.74	Q
10	1	Igor Kováč	Slovakia	7.76	Q
11	3	Dietmar Koszewski	Germany	7.81	Q
11	4	Tim Kroeker	Canada	7.81	q
13	1	Thomas J. Kearns	Ireland	7.82	q
13	3	Henry Andrade	Cape Verde	7.82	q, NR
15	2	Herwig Röttl	Austria	7.83	Q
16	1	Jiří Hudec	Czech Republic	7.84	q
17	4	Alain Cuypers	Belgium	7.86	
18	1	Antti Haapakoski	Finland	7.87	
19	4	Aleksandr Markin	Russia	7.90	
20	2	Arthur Blake	United States	7.91	
20	2	Guntis Peders	Latvia	7.91	
20	3	Sébastien Thibault	France	7.91	
23	3	Andrew Tulloch	Great Britain	7.97	
24	2	Kai Kyllönen	Finland	7.98	
25	3	Stelios Bisbas	Greece	8.00	
26	2	Carlos Sala	Spain	8.04	
27	1	Gaute Melby Gundersen	Norway	8.07	
28	4	Mauricio Carranza	El Salvador	8.68	NR

=== Semifinals ===
First 3 of each semifinal (Q) and the next 2 fastest (q) qualified for the final.

Rank	Heat	Name	Nationality	Time	Notes
1	2	Mark McKoy	Canada	7.44	Q, =NR
2	2	Tony Dees	United States	7.48	Q
3	1	Colin Jackson	Great Britain	7.58	Q
4	1	Florian Schwarthoff	Germany	7.61	Q
5	1	Igors Kazanovs	Latvia	7.62	Q
6	2	Sergey Usov	Belarus	7.65	Q
7	1	George Boroi	Romania	7.72	q
8	2	Emilio Valle	Cuba	7.74	q
9	2	Henry Andrade	Cape Verde	7.75	NR
10	1	Li Tong	China	7.76	
11	2	Dietmar Koszewski	Germany	7.81	
12	1	Herwig Röttl	Austria	7.82	
13	1	Jiří Hudec	Czech Republic	7.83	
14	2	Igor Kováč	Slovakia	7.84	
15	1	Tim Kroeker	Canada	7.89	
15	2	Thomas J. Kearns	Ireland	7.89	

=== Final ===
Rank	Lane	Name	Nationality	Time	Notes
1st place, gold medalist(s)	4	Mark McKoy	Canada	7.41	CR, F1
2nd place, silver medalist(s)	6	Colin Jackson	Great Britain	7.43	
3rd place, bronze medalist(s)	5	Tony Dees	United States	7.43	PB
4	3	Florian Schwarthoff	Germany	7.54	
5	7	Igors Kazanovs	Latvia	7.55	
6	1	George Boroi	Romania	7.72	
7	2	Emilio Valle	Cuba	7.74	
8	8	Sergey Usov	Belarus	7.90	
