= 1994 European Athletics Indoor Championships – Men's 60 metres hurdles =

The men's 60 metres hurdles event at the 1994 European Athletics Indoor Championships was held in Palais Omnisports de Paris-Bercy on 12 March.

== Medalists ==
Gold	Silver	Bronze
Colin Jackson; Great Britain	Gheorghe Boroi; Romania	Mike Fenner; Germany

== Results ==
=== Heats ===
First 2 from each heat (Q) and the next 6 fastest (q) qualified for the semifinals.

Rank	Heat	Name	Nationality	Time	Notes
1	4	Colin Jackson	Great Britain	7.48	Q
2	1	Mike Fenner	Germany	7.66	Q
3	1	Laurent Ottoz	Italy	7.67	Q
3	3	Gheorghe Boroi	Romania	7.67	Q
3	5	Igor Kováč	Slovakia	7.67	Q
6	4	Frank Busemann	Germany	7.69	Q
7	6	Igors Kazanovs	Latvia	7.70	Q
8	2	Tomasz Nagórka	Poland	7.71	Q
9	3	Hugh Teape	Great Britain	7.72	Q
10	2	Vincent Clarico	France	7.73	Q
11	2	Kai Kyllönen	Finland	7.74	q
11	3	Piotr Wójcik	Poland	7.74	q
13	5	Dan Philibert	France	7.75	Q
13	6	Stelios Bisbas	Greece	7.75	Q
15	4	Tibor Bédi	Hungary	7.78	q
15	6	Sergey Usov	Belarus	7.78	q
17	1	Niklas Eriksson	Sweden	7.79	q
18	1	Jiří Hudec	Czech Republic	7.80	q
19	3	Claes Albihn	Sweden	7.82	
19	5	Guntis Peders	Latvia	7.82	
21	3	Antonio Lanau	Spain	7.85	
22	5	Thomas Kearns	Ireland	7.86	
23	2	Herwig Röttl	Austria	7.88	
24	2	Vladimir Belokon	Ukraine	7.89	
24	5	Christian Maislinger	Austria	7.89	
26	1	Jonathan Nsenga	Belgium	7.90	
27	6	Erik Kaiser	Germany	7.92	
28	6	Jesús Font	Spain	7.95	
29	5	Levente Csillag	Hungary	7.98	
30	4	Hubert Grossard	Belgium	7.99	
31	4	Vadim Talanov	Belarus	8.07	
32	6	Aleksandr Yenko	Moldova	8.10	

=== Semifinals ===
First 2 from each semifinal qualified directly (Q) for the final.

Rank	Heat	Name	Nationality	Time	Notes
1	2	Colin Jackson	Great Britain	7.39	Q, CR
2	3	Gheorghe Boroi	Romania	7.58	Q
3	3	Igor Kováč	Slovakia	7.61	Q, NR
4	1	Dan Philibert	France	7.63	Q
5	3	Frank Busemann	Germany	7.67	AJR
6	1	Mike Fenner	Germany	7.63	Q
6	2	Jiří Hudec	Czech Republic	7.63	Q
8	2	Tomasz Nagórka	Poland	7.69	
9	3	Sergey Usov	Belarus	7.70	
10	2	Kai Kyllönen	Finland	7.71	
11	1	Piotr Wójcik	Poland	7.73	
11	3	Vincent Clarico	France	7.73	
13	2	Stelios Bisbas	Greece	7.74	
14	1	Igors Kazanovs	Latvia	7.75	
15	1	Hugh Teape	Great Britain	7.77	
16	3	Tibor Bédi	Hungary	7.79	
17	1	Niklas Eriksson	Sweden	7.80	
	2	Laurent Ottoz	Italy	DNF	

=== Final ===
Rank	Lane	Name	Nationality	Time	Notes
1st place, gold medalist(s)	5	Colin Jackson	Great Britain	7.41	
2nd place, silver medalist(s)	3	Gheorghe Boroi	Romania	7.57	
3rd place, bronze medalist(s)	2	Mike Fenner	Germany	7.58	
4	6	Dan Philibert	France	7.60	
5	4	Igor Kováč	Slovakia	7.61	=NR
6	1	Jiří Hudec	Czech Republic	7.72	
