= 1995 World Championships in Athletics – Men's 110 metres hurdles =

These are the official results of the Men's 110 metres Hurdles event at the 1995 IAAF World Championships in Gothenburg, Sweden. There were a total number of 48 participating athletes, with two semi-finals, four quarter-finals and six qualifying heats and the final held on Saturday August 12, 1995.

== Medalists ==
Gold	Allen Johnson; United States (USA)
Silver	(United Kingdom) Tony Jarrett; Great Britain (GBR)
Bronze	Roger Kingdom; United States (USA)

== Final ==
RANK	FINAL Wind: -0.1	TIME
	Allen Johnson (USA)	13.00
	Tony Jarrett (GBR)	13.04
	Roger Kingdom (USA)	13.19
4.	Jack Pierce (USA)	13.27
5.	Kyle Vander Kuyp (AUS)	13.30
6.	Dan Philibert (FRA)	13.34
7.	Erik Batte (CUB)	13.38
8.	Emilio Valle (CUB)	13.43

== Semi-finals ==
- Held on Saturday 1995-08-12

RANK	HEAT 1 Wind: -0.1	TIME
1.	Allen Johnson (USA)	13.25
2.	Jack Pierce (USA)	13.27
3.	Emilio Valle (CUB)	13.27
4.	Kyle Vander Kuyp (AUS)	13.36
5.	Igor Kováč (SVK)	13.45
6.	Antti Haapakoski (FIN)	13.54
7.	Andrew Tulloch (GBR)	13.62
8.	Eric Kaiser (GER)	13.71

RANK	HEAT 2 Wind: +1.1	TIME
1.	Tony Jarrett (GBR)	13.19
2.	Roger Kingdom (USA)	13.36
3.	Erik Batte (CUB)	13.39
4.	Dan Philibert (FRA)	13.49
5.	Robert Foster (JAM)	13.55
6.	Igors Kazanovs (LAT)	13.61
7.	Neil Owen (GBR)	13.92
—	Florian Schwarthoff (GER)	DNF

== Quarterfinals ==
- Held on Friday 1995-08-11

RANK	HEAT 1 Wind: +0.6	TIME
1.	Kyle Vander Kuyp (AUS)	13.29
2.	Roger Kingdom (USA)	13.32
3.	Robert Foster (JAM)	13.60
4.	Andrew Tulloch (GBR)	13.62
5.	Jonathan N'Senga (BEL)	13.67
6.	Vincent Clarico (FRA)	13.86
—	Sven Göhler (GER)	DNF
—	Niklas Eriksson (SWE)	DNF

RANK	HEAT 2 Wind: +2.8	TIME
1.	Jack Pierce (USA)	13.34w
2.	Igor Kovác (SVK)	13.40w
3.	Antti Haapakoski (FIN)	13.57w
4.	Neil Owen (GBR)	13.82w
5.	Patrik Torkelson (SWE)	13.84w
6.	Tim Kroeker (CAN)	13.88w
7.	Walmes de Souza (BRA)	13.91w
8.	Chen Yanhao (CHN)	18.02w

RANK	HEAT 3 Wind: +0.2	TIME
1.	Tony Jarrett (GBR)	13.23
2.	Florian Schwarthoff (GER)	13.24
3.	Dan Philibert (FRA)	13.43
4.	Emilio Valle (CUB)	13.47
5.	Claes Albihn (SWE)	13.52
6.	Johan Lisabeth (BEL)	13.77
7.	Guntis Peders (LAT)	13.84
8.	Jyrki Kähkönen (FIN)	13.98

RANK	HEAT 4 Wind: -0.1	TIME
1.	Erik Batte (CUB)	13.44
2.	Eric Kaiser (GER)	13.50
3.	Allen Johnson (USA)	13.54
4.	Igors Kazanovs (LAT)	13.55
5.	George Boroi (ROM)	13.79
6.	Levente Csillag (HUN)	13.92
7.	Gennadiy Dakshevich (RUS)	14.11
—	Kai Kyllönen (FIN)	DNF

== Qualifying heats ==
- Held on Friday 1995-08-11

RANK	HEAT 1 Wind: +0.8	TIME
1.	Jack Pierce (USA)	13.48
2.	Emilio Valle (CUB)	13.55
3.	Andrew Tulloch (GBR)	13.69
4.	Kai Kyllönen (FIN)	13.81
5.	Frank Asselman (BEL)	13.85
6.	Aleksandr Yenko (MDA)	13.97
7.	Emmanuel Romary (FRA)	14.11
8.	Sean Cahill (IRL)	14.33

RANK	HEAT 2 Wind: +0.0	TIME
1.	Florian Schwarthoff (GER)	13.45
2.	Kyle Vander Kuyp (AUS)	13.47
3.	Dan Philibert (FRA)	13.60
4.	Johan Lisabeth (BEL)	13.76
5.	Herwig Röttl (AUT)	13.85
6.	Gaute Melby Gundersen (NOR)	13.95
7.	Pedro Chiamulera (BRA)	14.33
8.	Mahesh Perera (SRI)	14.64

RANK	HEAT 3 Wind: +1.7	TIME
1.	Antti Haapakoski (FIN)	13.50
2.	Eric Kaiser (GER)	13.63
3.	George Boroi (ROM)	13.65
4.	Neil Owen (GBR)	13.74
5.	Levente Csillag (HUN)	13.75
6.	Tim Kroeker (CAN)	13.76
7.	Wagner Marseille (HAI)	14.03
8.	Arturo Rodríguez (CHI)	14.11

RANK	HEAT 4 Wind: +0.4	TIME
1.	Roger Kingdom (USA)	13.35
2.	Erik Batte (CUB)	13.44
3.	Chen Yanhao (CHN)	13.58
4.	Claes Albihn (SWE)	13.60
5.	Guntis Peders (LAT)	13.78
6.	Walmes de Souza (BRA)	13.84
7.	Jonathan N'Senga (BEL)	13.84
8.	Carlos Sala (ESP)	14.01

RANK	HEAT 5 Wind: -0.1	TIME
1.	Allen Johnson (USA)	13.44
2.	Robert Foster (JAM)	13.49
3.	Vincent Clarico (FRA)	13.67
4.	Patrik Torkelson (SWE)	13.72
5.	Sven Göhler (GER)	13.74
6.	Jyrki Kähkönen (FIN)	13.77
7.	Gennadiy Dakshevich (RUS)	13.82
8.	Gunnar Schrör (SUI)	13.95

RANK	HEAT 6 Wind: -0.3	TIME
1.	Tony Jarrett (GBR)	13.57
2.	Igor Kovac (SVK)	13.66
3.	Igors Kazanovs (LAT)	13.74
4.	Niklas Eriksson (SWE)	13.85
5.	Joilto Bonfim (BRA)	13.91
6.	William Erese (NGR)	13.92
7.	Nur Herman Majid (MAS)	14.19
8.	Prodromos Katsantonis (CYP)	14.28

== See also ==
- 1994 Men's European Championships 110m Hurdles (Helsinki)
- 1996 Men's Olympic 110m Hurdles (Atlanta)
- 1998 Men's European Championships 110m Hurdles (Budapest)
