= Yenko (surname) =

Yenko is a surname. Notable people with the surname include:

- Aleksandr Yenko (born 1972), Moldovan athlete
- Don Yenko (1927–1987), American car dealer and racecar driver
- Mariano Yenko, Philippine Basketball Association Commissioner 1983–1987
