= Kyle Vander-Kuyp =

Australian athlete (b.1971)

Personal information
- Nationality: Australian
- Born: 30 May 1971 (age 55) Paddington, Australia
- Height: 184 cm (6 ft 0 in)
- Weight: 81 kg (179 lb)

Sport
- Sport: Athletics
- Event: Hurdles
- Club: Ringwood Athletic Club

Kyle Bernard Vander-Kuyp (born 30 May 1971), is a former Australian athlete who competed at the 1996 Summer Olympics and the 2000 Summer Olympics.

== Biography ==
Vander-Kuyp is an indigenous Australian of the Worimi and Yuin tribe of North and South Coast New South Wales. At 5 weeks of age, he was adopted by Pat and Ben Vander-Kuyp.

Kyle bettered the Oceanian record in the 110 metres hurdles to 13.29 seconds at the 1995 World Championships in Athletics. In addition to his two Olympic Games appearances he competed at the 1994, 1998 and 2006 Commonwealth Games.

He finished third behind Colin Jackson in the 100 metres hurdles event at the British 1993 AAA Championships.

In 2022, he was awarded the Australian Institute of Sport Athlete Community Engagement Award.

== Competition record ==
| Year | Competition | Venue | Position | Event | Notes |
Representing Australia
| 1990 | Commonwealth Games | Auckland, New Zealand | 6th | 110 m hurdles | 14.07 |
| 1990 | World Junior Championships | Plovdiv, Bulgaria | 3rd | 110 m hurdles | 13.85 |
| 1993 | World Championships | Stuttgart, Germany | 10th (sf) | 110 m hurdles | 13.48 |
| 1994 | Commonwealth Games | Victoria, Canada | 5th | 110 m hurdles | 13.75 |
| 1994 | Commonwealth Games | Victoria, Canada | 2nd | 4 × 100 m relay | 38.88 |
| 1994 | World Cup | London, United Kingdom | 6th | 110 m hurdles | 13.71 |
| 1995 | World Indoor Championships | Barcelona, Spain | 8th | 60 m hurdles | 7.73 |
| 1995 | World Championships | Gothenburg, Sweden | 5th | 110 m hurdles | 13.30 |
| 1996 | Olympic Games | Atlanta, United States | 7th | 110 m hurdles | 13.40 |
| 1997 | World Indoor Championships | Paris, France | 14th (h) | 60 m hurdles | 7.73 |
| 1997 | World Championships | Athens, Greece | 9th (sf) | 110 m hurdles | 13.49 |
| 1998 | Commonwealth Games | Kuala Lumpur, Malaysia | 5th | 110 m hurdles | 13.67 |
| 1999 | World Championships | Seville, Spain | 20th (qf) | 110 m hurdles | 13.56 |
| 2000 | Olympic Games | Sydney, Australia | 16th (sf) | 110 m hurdles | 13.63 |

| Preceded by None | Cleo Bachelor of the Year; 1998 | Succeeded by Anthony Field |
