= Johan Lisabeth =

Belgian hurdler

Johan Lisabeth (born 25 June 1971 in Tielt, West Flanders) is a retired Belgian athlete who specialised in the high hurdles. He represented his country at the 1996 Summer Olympics, reaching the semifinals, and 1995 World Championships, reaching the second round.

His personal bests are 13.53 seconds in the 110 metres hurdles (Atlanta 1996) and 7.69 seconds in the indoor 60 metres hurdles (Ghent 1996).

== Competition record ==
Year	Competition	Venue	Position	Event	Notes
Representing Belgium
1989	European Junior Championships	Varaždin, Yugoslavia	10th (sf)	110 m hurdles	14.90
1990	World Junior Championships	Plovdiv, Bulgaria	21st (h)	110 m hurdles	14.69 (wind: +0.6 m/s)
1995	World Indoor Championships	Barcelona, Spain	24th (h)	60 m hurdles	7.88
1995	World Championships	Gothenburg, Sweden	18th (qf)	110 m hurdles	13.77
1996	European Indoor Championships	Stockholm, Sweden	6th	60 m hurdles	7.78
1996	Olympic Games	Atlanta, United States	14th (qf)	110 m hurdles	13.53
1997	World Indoor Championships	Paris, France	16th (h)	60 m hurdles	7.75
