= Claes Albihn =

Swedish hurdler

Personal information
- Born: May 12, 1971 (age 55) Stockholm, Sweden
- Height: 1.90 m (6 ft 3 in)
- Weight: 83 kg (183 lb)

Sport
- Sport: Track and field
- Events: 110 m hurdles, 60 m hurdles
- Club: Spårvägens FK

Claes Johan Albihn (born 12 May 1971 in Stockholm) is a retired Swedish athlete who specialised in the sprint hurdles. He represented his country at the 1996 Summer Olympics and the 1995 World Championships.

His personal bests are 13.46 seconds in the 110 metres hurdles (-1.8 m/s, Helsinki 1995) and 7.82 seconds in the 60 metres hurdles (Paris 1994).

== Competition record ==
Year	Competition	Venue	Position	Event	Notes
Representing Sweden
1989	European Junior Championships	Varaždin, Yugoslavia	9th (sf)	110 m hurdles	14.80
1992	European Indoor Championships	Genoa, Italy	18th (h)	60 m hurdles	7.92
1992	World Cup	Havana, Cuba	6th	110 m hurdles	14.12
1994	European Indoor Championships	Paris, France	19th (h)	60 m hurdles	7.82
1994	European Championships	Helsinki, Finland	18th (h)	110 m hurdles	13.72
1995	World Championships	Gothenburg, Sweden	11th (qf)	110 m hurdles	13.52
1996	Olympic Games	Atlanta, United States	34th (h)	110 m hurdles	13.79
