= Gaute Melby Gundersen =

Norwegian hurdler (born 1972)

Personal information
- Born: 13 June 1972 (age 54) Oslo, Norway

Sport
- Sport: Track and field

Gaute Melby Gundersen (born 13 June 1972) is a retired Norwegian athlete who specialised in the sprint hurdles. He represented his country at two outdoor and three indoor World Championships.

His personal bests are 13.62 seconds in the 110 metres hurdles (+1.5 m/s, Tønsberg 1997) and 7.70 seconds in the 60 metres hurdles (Piraeus 1998).

== Competition record ==
Year	Competition	Venue	Position	Event	Notes
Representing Norway
1990	World Junior Championships	Plovdiv, Bulgaria	8th	110 m hurdles	14.21
1991	Universiade	Sheffield, United Kingdom	21st (h)	110 m hurdles	14.53
1991	European Junior Championships	Thessaloniki, Greece	3rd (sf)	110 m hurdles	14.34^{1}
1993	World Indoor Championships	Toronto, Canada	27th (h)	60 m hurdles	8.07
1993	Universiade	Buffalo, United States	15th (sf)	110 m hurdles	14.60
1994	European Championships	Helsinki, Finland	20th (h)	110 m hurdles	13.77
1994	European Championships	Helsinki, Finland	9th (h)	4 × 100 m relay	39.80
1995	World Indoor Championships	Barcelona, Spain	22nd (h)	60 m hurdles	7.85
1995	World Championships	Gothenburg, Sweden	37th (h)	110 m hurdles	13.95
1997	World Indoor Championships	Paris, France	24th (h)	60 m hurdles	7.88
1997	World Championships	Athens, Greece	30th (qf)	110 m hurdles	13.91
1998	European Championships	Budapest, Hungary	23rd (h)	110 m hurdles	14.17

^{1}Did not finish in the final
