= Athletics at the 1994 Commonwealth Games – Men's 110 metres hurdles =

Men's 110 metres hurdles at the Commonwealth Games

The men's 110 metres hurdles event at the 1994 Commonwealth Games was held on 22 and 23 August at the Centennial Stadium in Victoria, British Columbia.

== Medalists ==
Gold	Silver	Bronze
Colin Jackson; Wales	Tony Jarrett; England	Paul Gray; Wales

== Results ==
=== Heats ===
Wind:
Heat 1: +1.4 m/s, Heat 2: +1.8 m/s

Rank	Heat	Name	Nationality	Time	Notes
1	1	Colin Jackson	Wales	13.51	Q
2	2	Tony Jarrett	England	13.52	Q
3	2	Paul Gray	Wales	13.53	Q
4	2	Kyle Vander Kuyp	Australia	13.61	Q
5	1	Tim Kroeker	Canada	13.80	Q
6	2	Andrew Tulloch	England	13.87	q
	1	Robert Foster	Jamaica	~~13.88~~	Q
7	2	Ken Campbell	Scotland	13.92	q
8	1	Lloyd Cowan	England	13.96	
9	1	David Cooper	Australia	14.05	
10	1	Adrian Woodley	Canada	14.50	
11	2	Dion Trowers	Canada	14.89	
12	1	William Gamatis	Seychelles	15.30	
	2	Nurherman Majid	Malaysia	DNF	

=== Final ===
Wind: +1.6 m/s

Rank	Lane	Name	Nationality	Time	Notes
1st place, gold medalist(s)	6	Colin Jackson	Wales	13.08	=GR
2nd place, silver medalist(s)	5	Tony Jarrett	England	13.22	
3rd place, bronze medalist(s)	4	Paul Gray	Wales	13.54	
4	2	Andrew Tulloch	England	13.69	
5	8	Kyle Vander Kuyp	Australia	13.75	
6	7	Ken Campbell	Scotland	13.86	
7	3	Tim Kroeker	Canada	13.93	
	1	Robert Foster	Jamaica	DQ	
