= Robin Korving =

Dutch hurdler (born 1974)

Personal information
- Born: 29 July 1974 (age 52) Heerhugowaard, North Holland, Netherlands

Sport
- Sport: Track and field
Medal record
Representing Netherlands
European Championships
Bronze medal – third place	1998 Budapest	110 m hurdles

Robin Korving (Dutch: [ˈrɔbɪŋ ˈkɔrvɪŋ]; born 29 July 1974) is a former hurdler from the Netherlands, best known for winning the bronze medal at the 1998 European Championships in Budapest, Hungary. He was Holland's leading hurdler in the 1990s, winning eight national titles in a row (1993–2000). He was injured prior to the 2000 Summer Olympics in Sydney, Australia.

== Competition record ==
Year	Competition	Venue	Position	Event	Notes
Representing the Netherlands
1992	World Junior Championships	Seoul, South Korea	4th	110 m hurdles	14.11 (wind: +1.6 m/s)
1993	European Junior Championships	San Sebastián, Spain	1st	110 m hurdles	13.85
1993	World Championships	Stuttgart, Germany	44th (h)	110 m hurdles	14.88
1994	European Championships	Helsinki, Finland	29th (h)	110 m hurdles	14.31
1995	Universiade	Fukuoka, Japan	11th (sf)	110 m hurdles	13.97
1997	World Indoor Championships	Paris, France	19th (h)	60 m hurdles	7.80
1997	World Championships	Athens, Greece	11th (sf)	110 m hurdles	13.51
1997	Universiade	Catania, Italy	4th	110 m hurdles	13.70
1998	European Indoor Championships	Valencia, Spain	11th (sf)	60 m hurdles	7.67
1998	European Championships	Budapest, Hungary	3rd	110 m hurdles	13.20
1998	World Cup	Johannesburg, South Africa	4th	110 m hurdles	13.25
1999	World Championships	Seville, Spain	10th (sf)	110 m hurdles	13.45

Awards
Preceded by Marko Koers	Herman van Leeuwen Cup; 1998	Succeeded by Kamiel Maase
