= Guntis Peders =

Latvian hurdler

Personal information
- Born: 15 August 1973 (age 53) Valmiera, Soviet Union

Sport
- Sport: Track and field
Medal record
Representing Latvia
European Indoor Championships
Silver medal – second place	1996 Stockholm	60m hurdles

Guntis Peders (born 15 August 1973) is a retired Latvian athlete who specialised in the high hurdles. His biggest success is the silver medal at the 1996 European Indoor Championships in Stockholm, where his country, thanks to him and Igors Kazanovs, for the first time won two medals in one event. In addition, he represented Latvia at the 1996 Summer Olympics, as well as 1995 and 1997 World Championships.

He retired from professional athletics after the 1999 season.

His personal bests are 13.47 seconds in the 110 metres hurdles (Tallinn 1996) and 7.65 seconds in the indoor 60 metres hurdles (Stockholm 1996).

== Competition record ==
Year	Competition	Venue	Position	Event	Notes
Representing Latvia
1993	World Indoor Championships	Toronto, Canada	21st (h)	60 m hurdles	7.91
1993	Universiade	Buffalo, United States	7th	110 m hurdles	14.17
1994	European Indoor Championships	Paris, France	19th (h)	60 m hurdles	7.82
1994	European Championships	Helsinki, Finland	30th (h)	110 m hurdles	15.57
1995	World Championships	Gothenburg, Sweden	21st (qf)	110 m hurdles	13.84
1996	European Indoor Championships	Stockholm, Sweden	2nd	60 m hurdles	7.65
1996	Olympic Games	Atlanta, United States	19th (qf)	110 m hurdles	13.59
1997	World Championships	Athens, Greece	19th (qf)	110 m hurdles	13.55
1998	European Championships	Budapest, Hungary	13th (sf)	110 m hurdles	13.78
