= Krzysztof Mehlich =

Polish hurdler

Personal information
- Born: 2 August 1974 (age 52) Strzelce Opolskie, Poland
- Height: 1.90 m (6 ft 3 in)
- Weight: 79 kg (174 lb) (1996)

Sport
- Sport: Track and field
- Events: 110 m hurdles, 60 m hurdles
Medal record
Men's athletics
Representing Poland
Summer Universiade
Bronze medal – third place	1995 Fukuoka	110 m hurdles

Krzysztof Jan Mehlich (born 2 August 1974) is a retired Polish athlete who specialised in the sprint hurdles. He represented his country at the 1996 Summer Olympics, reaching the semifinals, as well as two indoor World Championships. In addition, he won the bronze medal at the 1995 Summer Universiade.

He has personal bests of 13.40 seconds outdoors (Tallinn 1996) and 7.60 seconds indoors (Spała 1999).

His older brother, Ronald, is also a former hurdler.

== Competition record ==
Year	Competition	Venue	Position	Event	Notes
Representing Poland
1993	European Junior Championships	San Sebastián, Spain	10th (h)	400 m hurdles	52.53
1993	European Junior Championships	San Sebastián, Spain	3rd	4 × 400 m relay	3:08.75
1995	Universiade	Fukuoka, Japan	3rd	110 m hurdles	13.66
1995	Universiade	Fukuoka, Japan	6th	4 × 400 m relay	3:05.08
1996	Olympic Games	Atlanta, United States	11th (sf)	110 m hurdles	13.55
1997	World Indoor Championships	Paris, France	23rd (h)	60 m hurdles	7.87
1997	Universiade	Catania, Italy	22nd (sf)	110 m hurdles	14.44
1998	European Championships	Budapest, Hungary	17th (h)	110 m hurdles	13.89
1999	World Indoor Championships	Maebashi, Japan	10th (h)	60 m hurdles	7.65
2002	European Indoor Championships	Vienna, Austria	8th (sf)	60 m hurdles	7.71
