= Emmanuel Romary =

French hurdler

Personal information
- Born: 12 October 1968 (age 57) Luxeuil-les-Bains, France
- Height: 1.87 m (6 ft 2 in)
- Weight: 77 kg (170 lb)

Sport
- Sport: Athletics
- Event: 110 metres hurdles
- Club: Fensch Moselle

Emmanuel Romary (born 12 October 1968 in Luxeuil-les-Bains) is a retired French athlete who specialised in the sprint hurdles. He represented his country at the 1996 Summer Olympics and 1995 World Championships.

His personal bests are 13.52 seconds in the 110 metres hurdles (+1.9 m/s, Évry-Bondoufle 1996) and 7.77 seconds in the 60 metres hurdles (Paris 1996).

== International competitions ==
Year	Competition	Venue	Position	Event	Notes
Representing France
1991	Universiade	Sheffield, United Kingdom	5th	110 m hurdles	14.06
1993	Universiade	Buffalo, United States	6th (sf)	110 m hurdles	14.03
1995	World Championships	Gothenburg, Sweden	42nd (h)	110 m hurdles	14.11
1995	Universiade	Fukushima, Japan	12th (sf)	110 m hurdles	13.98
1996	Olympic Games	Atlanta, United States	28th (qf)	110 m hurdles	13.81
