= 1998 European Athletics Championships – Men's 110 metres hurdles =

Men's 110 metres hurdles at the European Athletics Championships

The men's 110 metres hurdles at the 1998 European Athletics Championships was held at the Népstadion on 21 and 22 August.

== Medalists ==
Gold	Colin Jackson; Great Britain
Silver	Falk Balzer; Germany
Bronze	Robin Korving; Netherlands

== Results ==
KEY:	q	Fastest non-qualifiers	Q	Qualified	NR	National record	PB	Personal best	SB	Seasonal best

=== Round 1 ===
Qualification: First 3 in each heat (Q) and the next 4 fastest (q) advance to the Semifinals.

Rank	Heat	Name	Nationality	Time	Notes
1	3	Colin Jackson	Great Britain	13.31	Q
2	2	Falk Balzer	Germany	13.47	Q
3	4	Tony Jarrett	Great Britain	13.51	Q
4	1	Mike Fenner	Germany	13.52	Q
5	1	Jonathan Nsenga	Belgium	13.55	Q
6	2	Artur Kohutek	Poland	13.58	Q
7	4	Robin Korving	Netherlands	13.61	Q
8	4	Staņislavs Olijars	Latvia	13.62	Q
9	3	Florian Schwarthoff	Germany	13.64	Q
10	2	Sebastien Thibault	France	13.65	Q
11	1	Guntis Peders	Latvia	13.66	Q
12	1	Vincent Clarico	France	13.68	q
13	3	Dan Philibert	France	13.78	Q
14	2	Andrew Tulloch	Great Britain	13.81	q
15	1	Mauro Rossi	Italy	13.83	q
16	4	Sven Pieters	Belgium	13.85	q
17	1	Krzysztof Mehlich	Poland	13.89	
18	3	Elmar Lichtenegger	Austria	13.96	
19	4	Raphael Monachon	Switzerland	13.98	
20	2	Peter Coghlan	Ireland	14.00	
21	2	Ivan Bitzi	Switzerland	14.01	
22	3	Igors Kazanovs	Latvia	14.04	
23	3	Gaute Gundersen	Norway	14.17	
24	4	Balázs Kovács	Hungary	14.22	
25	4	Hipólito Montesinos	Spain	14.30	
26	1	Sergey Khodanovich	Belarus	14.36	
27	2	Dimitrios Siatounis	Greece	14.38	
28	3	Zhivko Videnov	Bulgaria	14.44	
29	4	Ronald Mehlich	Poland	14.44	
30	1	Zoran Miljus	Croatia	14.48	

=== Semifinals ===
Qualification: First 4 in each heat (Q) advance to the Final.

Rank	Heat	Name	Nationality	Time	Notes
1	1	Colin Jackson	Great Britain	13.02	Q, CR
2	1	Florian Schwarthoff	Germany	13.19	Q, SB
3	2	Falk Balzer	Germany	13.24	Q
4	1	Jonathan Nsenga	Belgium	13.25	Q, NR
5	1	Mike Fenner	Germany	13.29	Q
6	2	Robin Korving	Netherlands	13.31	Q
7	2	Tony Jarrett	Great Britain	13.33	Q
8	1	Dan Philibert	France	13.43	
9	2	Artur Kohutek	Poland	13.47	Q
10	1	Vincent Clarico	France	13.53	SB
11	1	Mauro Rossi	Italy	13.62	
12	2	Sven Pieters	Belgium	13.69	
13	2	Guntis Peders	Latvia	13.78	
14	2	Andrew Tulloch	Great Britain	13.79	
15	2	Sebastien Thibault	France	13.86	
	4	Staņislavs Olijars	Latvia	DSQ	

=== Final ===
Rank	Name	Nationality	Time	Notes
1st place, gold medalist(s)	Colin Jackson	Great Britain	13.02	CR
2nd place, silver medalist(s)	Falk Balzer	Germany	13.12	PB
3rd place, bronze medalist(s)	Robin Korving	Netherlands	13.20	=NR
4	Florian Schwarthoff	Germany	13.23	
5	Artur Kohutek	Poland	13.29	
6	Tony Jarrett	Great Britain	13.32	
7	Mike Fenner	Germany	13.38	
8	Jonathan Nsenga	Belgium	13.54	
