= 1986 World Junior Championships in Athletics – Men's 110 metres hurdles =

The men's 110 metres hurdles event at the 1986 World Junior Championships in Athletics was held in Athens, Greece, at Olympic Stadium on 18 and 19 July. 106.7 cm (3'6) (senior implement) hurdles were used.

== Medalists ==
Gold	Colin Jackson; United Kingdom
Silver	Jon Ridgeon; United Kingdom
Bronze	Emilio Valle; Cuba

== Results ==
=== Final ===
19 July
Wind: -0.8 m/s

Rank	Name	Nationality	Time	Notes
1st place, gold medalist(s)	Colin Jackson	United Kingdom	13.44	
2nd place, silver medalist(s)	Jon Ridgeon	United Kingdom	13.91	
3rd place, bronze medalist(s)	Emilio Valle	Cuba	14.00	
4	Philippe Tourret	France	14.11	
5	Norbert Tomaschek	Austria	14.43	
6	Thomas Weimann	Austria	14.46	
7	Vyacheslav Ivashchenko	Soviet Union	14.48	
8	Mikhail Ryabukhin	Soviet Union	14.49	

=== Semifinals ===
19 July

==== Semifinal 1 ====
Wind: -0.7 m/s

Rank	Name	Nationality	Time	Notes
1	Jon Ridgeon	United Kingdom	13.94	Q
2	Emilio Valle	Cuba	14.02	Q
3	Thomas Weimann	Austria	14.48	Q
4	Mikhail Ryabukhin	Soviet Union	14.51	Q
5	Hiroshi Kakimori	Japan	14.52	
6	Markus Rappe	West Germany	14.77	
7	Jamie Hence	United States	14.84	
8	Akwasi Abrefa	Ghana	15.43	

==== Semifinal 2 ====
Wind: +0.4 m/s

Rank	Name	Nationality	Time	Notes
1	Colin Jackson	United Kingdom	13.72	Q
2	Philippe Tourret	France	14.18	Q
3	Vyacheslav Ivashchenko	Soviet Union	14.32	Q
4	Norbert Tomaschek	Austria	14.34	Q
5	Manuel Mayor	Cuba	14.46	
6	Takahiro Matsuhisa	Japan	14.49	
7	Hermann Clark	United States	14.68	
8	Frank Mene	Nigeria	15.04	

=== Heats ===
18 July

==== Heat 1 ====
Wind: -0.4 m/s

Rank	Name	Nationality	Time	Notes
1	Philippe Tourret	France	14.48	Q
2	Takahiro Matsuhisa	Japan	14.55	Q
3	Hermann Clark	United States	14.58	Q
4	Markus Rappe	West Germany	14.61	Q
5	Mauro Re	Italy	14.66	
6	Steve Yorston	Canada	14.82	
7	Roberto Mobarec	Bolivia	16.19	

==== Heat 2 ====
Wind: +1.1 m/s

Rank	Name	Nationality	Time	Notes
1	Mikhail Ryabukhin	Soviet Union	14.40	Q
2	Thomas Weimann	Austria	14.53	Q
3	Frank Mene	Nigeria	14.88	Q
4	Akwasi Abrefa	Ghana	14.98	Q
5	Antonio Piedra	Spain	14.99	

==== Heat 3 ====
Wind: -0.5 m/s

Rank	Name	Nationality	Time	Notes
1	Emilio Valle	Cuba	14.22	Q
2	Jon Ridgeon	United Kingdom	14.26	Q
3	Vyacheslav Ivashchenko	Soviet Union	14.41	Q
4	Norbert Tomaschek	Austria	14.42	Q
5	Jorge Guevara	Mexico	15.33	
6	Adnan Aly	Kuwait	15.90	
7	Paolo Bertolissi	Italy	16.18	

==== Heat 4 ====
Wind: -0.9 m/s

Rank	Name	Nationality	Time	Notes
1	Colin Jackson	United Kingdom	14.25	Q
2	Manuel Mayor	Cuba	14.41	Q
3	Hiroshi Kakimori	Japan	14.48	Q
4	Jamie Hence	United States	14.56	Q
5	Grigorios Zagoras	Greece	14.71	
6	Colin Grant	Canada	14.77	
7	Yasser Abdulrahman Fallatah Kadhy	Saudi Arabia	16.24	

== Participation ==
According to an unofficial count, 26 athletes from 18 countries participated in the event.

- Austria (2)
- Bolivia (1)
- Canada (2)
- Cuba (2)
- France (1)
- Ghana (1)
- Greece (1)
- Italy (2)
- Japan (2)
- Kuwait (1)
- Mexico (1)
- Nigeria (1)
- Saudi Arabia (1)
- Soviet Union (2)
- Spain (1)
- United Kingdom (2)
- United States (2)
- West Germany (1)
