= William Erese =

Nigerian hurdler (born 1976)

Personal information
- Born: 12 September 1976 (age 50) Benin City, Nigeria

Sport
- Sport: Track and field
Medal record
Representing Nigeria
African Games
Gold medal – first place	1995 Harare	110 m hurdles
Gold medal – first place	1999 Johannesburg	110 m hurdles
African Championships
Gold medal – first place	1996 Yaoundé	110 m hurdles
Silver medal – second place	1998 Dakar	110 m hurdles

William Erese (born 12 September 1976) is a retired male hurdler from Nigeria. His personal best time is 13.42 seconds, achieved in July 2003 in Mals, Italy. This is the current Nigerian record.

Erese was an All-American hurdler for the USC Trojans track and field team, finishing 5th in the 110 meters hurdles at the 1998 NCAA Division I Outdoor Track and Field Championships.

== Achievements ==
Year	Competition	Venue	Position	Event	Notes
Representing Nigeria
1995	World Championships	Gothenburg, Sweden	36th (h)	110 m hurdles	13.95
1995	Universiade	Fukuoka, Japan	13th (sf)	110 m hurdles	13.99
1995	All-Africa Games	Harare, Zimbabwe	1st	110 m hurdles	13.73
1996	African Championships	Yaoundé, Cameroon	2nd	110 m hurdles	13.7
1996	Olympic Games	Atlanta, United States	45th (h)	110 m hurdles	13.98
1997	World Championships	Athens, Greece	36th (h)	110 m hurdles	13.95
1997	Universiade	Catania, Italy	11th (sf)	110 m hurdles	13.82
1998	African Championships	Dakar, Senegal	2nd	110 m hurdles	13.92
1999	Universiade	Palma de Mallorca, Spain	5th	110 m hurdles	13.74
1999	World Championships	Seville, Spain	27th (qf)	110 m hurdles	13.65
1999	All-Africa Games	Johannesburg, South Africa	1st	110 m hurdles	13.71
2003	World Championships	Paris, France	16th (sf)	110 m hurdles	13.70
2003	All-Africa Games	Abuja, Nigeria	2nd (h)	110 m hurdles	13.96
