= Mike Fenner =

German hurdler

Mike Fenner (born 24 April 1971 in East Berlin) is a retired German hurdler.

His personal best is 13.06 seconds, achieved in June 1995 in Scheeßel. This ranks him second among German 110 m hurdlers, only behind Florian Schwarthoff.

== Competition record ==
Year	Competition	Venue	Position	Event	Notes
Representing East Germany
1989	European Junior Championships	Varaždin, Yugoslavia	2nd (h)	60 m hurdles	14.32
1990	European Indoor Championships	Glasgow, United Kingdom	12th (h)	60 m hurdles	7.82
1990	World Junior Championships	Plovdiv, Bulgaria	6th	110 m hurdles	14.18 (-0.2 m/s)
Representing Germany
1991	World Championships	Tokyo, Japan	26th (h)	110 m hurdles	13.78
1992	European Indoor Championships	Genoa, Italy	19th (h)	60 m hurdles	7.93
1994	European Indoor Championships	Paris, France	3rd	60 m hurdles	7.58
1994	European Championships	Helsinki, Finland	5th	110 m hurdles	13.53
1997	World Indoor Championships	Paris, France	10th (h)	60 m hurdles	7.71
1997	World Championships	Athens, Greece	15th (qf)	110 m hurdles	13.50
1998	European Indoor Championships	Valencia, Spain	3rd	60 m hurdles	7.58
1998	European Championships	Budapest, Hungary	7th	110 m hurdles	13.38
1999	World Indoor Championships	Maebashi, Japan	9th (h)	60 m hurdles	7.59
2001	World Championships	Edmonton, Canada	11th (sf)	110 m hurdles	13.49
2002	European Indoor Championships	Vienna, Austria	7th	60 m hurdles	7.70
2002	European Championships	Munich, Germany	5th	110 m hurdles	13.39
2004	Olympic Games	Athens, Greece	17th (qf)	110 m hurdles	13.53
2006	World Indoor Championships	Moscow, Russia	17th (h)	60 m hurdles	7.76

=== Track records ===
As of 7 September 2024, Fenner holds the following track records for 110 metres hurdles.

Location	Time	Windspeed m/s	Date
Lindau	13.33	+ 0.8	28/07/1995
Mals	13.31	0.0	26/07/1998
Waldshut-Tiengen	13.31	– 0.3	02/08/1998
