= Stelios Bisbas =

Greek hurdler

Personal information
- Born: 9 November 1968 (age 57) Athens, Greece
- Height: 1.85 m (6 ft 1 in)
- Weight: 74 kg (163 lb) (1996)

Sport
- Sport: Track and field
- Events: 110 m hurdles, 60 m hurdles
- Club: Ethnikos GS
Medal record
Representing Greece
Mediterranean Games
Silver medal – second place	1993 Narbonne	110m hurdles
Summer Universiade
Bronze medal – third place	1993 Buffalo	110m hurdles

Stylianos "Stelios" Bisbas (Greek: Στυλιανός "Στέλιος" Μπίσμπας; born 9 November 1968 in Athens) is a retired Greek athlete who specialised in the sprint hurdles. He represented his country at the 1996 Summer Olympics without qualifying for the second round. In addition, he won silver at the 1993 Mediterranean Games and bronze at the 1993 Summer Universiade.

His personal bests are 13.61 seconds in the 110 metres hurdles (Athens 1996) and 7.70 in the 60 metres hurdles (Piraeus 1996).

== Competition record ==
Year	Competition	Venue	Position	Event	Notes
Representing Greece
1986	World Junior Championships	Athens, Greece	33rd (h)	400 m hurdles	55.30
1987	Mediterranean Games	Latakia, Syria	7th	110 m hurdles	14.46
1989	Universiade	Duisburg, West Germany	10th (sf)	110 m hurdles	13.85
1992	European Indoor Championships	Genoa, Italy	20th (h)	60 m hurdles	7.93
1993	World Indoor Championships	Toronto, Canada	25th (h)	60 m hurdles	8.00
1993	Mediterranean Games	Narbonne, France	2nd	110 m hurdles	13.67
1993	Universiade	Buffalo, United States	3rd	110 m hurdles	13.72
1994	European Indoor Championships	Paris, France	13th (sf)	60 m hurdles	7.74
1995	Universiade	Fukuoka, Japan	10th (qf)	110 m hurdles	13.91^{1}
1996	European Indoor Championships	Stockholm, Sweden	9th (sf)	60 m hurdles	7.82
1996	Olympic Games	Atlanta, United States	37th (h)	110 m hurdles	13.85

^{1}Did not start in the semifinals
