= Ronald Mehlich =

Polish hurdler (1969–2023)

Personal information
- Born: 26 September 1969 Strzelce Opolskie, Poland
- Died: 28 December 2023 (aged 54)

Sport
- Sport: Track and field

Ronald Mehlich (26 September 1969 – 26 December 2023) was a Polish athlete who specialised in the sprint hurdles.

== Biography ==
Ronald Mehlich was born in Strzelce Opolskie on 26 September 1969. He represented his country at the 1997 World Championships, as well as two World Indoor Championships. Mehlich had personal bests of 13.44 seconds outdoors (Katowice 1997) and 7.61 seconds indoors (Valencia 1998). His younger brother, Krzysztof, is also a former hurdler. Ronald Mehlich died on 26 December 2023, at the age of 54.

== Competition record ==
Year	Competition	Venue	Position	Event	Notes
Representing Poland
1993	Universiade	Buffalo, United States	9th (sf)	110 m hurdles	13.83
1995	World Indoor Championships	Barcelona, Spain	15th (sf)	60 m hurdles	7.84
1995	Universiade	Fukuoka, Japan	–	110 m hurdles	DNF
1997	World Indoor Championships	Paris, France	10th (sf)	60 m hurdles	7.76
1997	World Championships	Athens, Greece	17th (qf)	110 m hurdles	13.51
1997	Universiade	Catania, Italy	9th (sf)	110 m hurdles	13.81
1998	European Indoor Championships	Valencia, Spain	8th	60 m hurdles	7.68
1998	European Championships	Budapest, Hungary	29th (h)	110 m hurdles	14.44
