= Mauro Rossi =

Italian hurdler

Personal information
- Nationality: Italian
- Born: 1 June 1973 (age 53) Rome

Sport
- Country: Italy
- Sport: Athletics
- Event: 110 metres hurdles
- Club: G.S. Fiamme Gialle

Achievements and titles
- Personal bests: 60 m hs: 7.66 (1997); 110 m hs: 13.48 (1998)

Mauro Rossi (born 1 June 1973) is a former Italian hurdler.

== Biography ==
His personal best 13:48, set in 1998, is the seventh best Italian performance of all time. In 1998 it was also the 29th world best performance of the year.

== Achievements ==
Year	Competition	Venue	Position	Event	Time	Notes
1997	World Indoor Championships	(France) Paris	Heat	60 metres hurdles	7.98	
1998	European Championships	(Hungary) Budapest	Semi	110 metres hurdles	13.62	

== National titles ==
He won six national championships at senior level. For three consecutive years, from 1996 to 1998, he won both the indoor edition on 60 m hs, than the outdoor on 110 m hs.

- Italian Athletics Championships
  - 110 metres hurdles: 1996, 1997, 1998
- Italian Athletics Indoor Championships
  - 60 metres hurdles: 1996, 1997, 1998

== See also ==
- Italian all-time lists - 110 metres hurdles
