= Gennadiy Dakshevich =

Russian hurdler (born 1966)

Personal information
- Born: 15 March 1966 (age 59) Soviet Union

Sport
- Sport: Athletics
- Event(s): 60 metres hurdles 110 metres hurdles

Gennadiy Dakshevich (Russian: Геннадий Дакшевич; born 15 March 1966) is a retired hurdler who represented the Soviet Union and later Russia. He competed at two World Championships, in 1991 and 1995.

His personal bests are 13.55 seconds in the 110 metres hurdles (Kyiv 1993) and 7.59 seconds in the 60 metres hurdles (Moscow 1995).

== International competitions ==
Year	Competition	Venue	Position	Event	Notes
Representing the Soviet Union
1991	Universiade	Sheffield, United Kingdom	8th	110 m hurdles	14.55
1991	World Championships	Tokyo, Japan	18th (h)	110 m hurdles	13.69
Representing Russia
1995	World Championships	Gothenburg, Sweden	28th (qf)	110 m hurdles	14.11
