= Terry Reese =

American hurdler

Terry Reese (born June 20, 1967) is an American male former track and field hurdler who specialized in the 110-meter hurdles. His best season came in 1997: that year he had his only top three finish at national level at the 1997 USA Outdoor Track and Field Championships, placed sixth in the final at the 1997 World Championships in Athletics, and set a lifetime best of 13.22 seconds in Cologne, Germany. He had his highest global ranking that year, at ninth overall. He was a finalist at national level in other years, taking fourth in 1995 and sixth in 2001 and 2002.

Born in Orlando, Florida, he attended North Carolina State University and competed for their NC State Wolfpack team. His younger brother Kelvin was also a hurdler for the institution. His best while there was seventh at the NCAA outdoors in his final year. He had little success until pairing with coach Trevor Graham in 1995. His performances greatly improved thereafter.

== International competitions ==
Year	Competition	Venue	Position	Event	Notes
1997	World Championships	Athens, Greece	6th	110 m hurdles	13.30
