= Tim Kroeker =

Canadian hurdler (born 1971)

Personal information
- Full name: Timothy Kroeker
- Born: 25 May 1971 (age 55) Chilliwack, British Columbia, Canada
- Height: 1.86 m (6 ft 1 in)
- Weight: 87 kg (192 lb)

Sport
- Sport: Athletics
- Event: 110 m hurdles
- College team: Simon Fraser Red Leafs
- Club: Coquitlam Cheetahs

Timothy Kroeker (born 25 May 1971) is a retired Canadian athlete who specialised in the 110 metres hurdles. He represented his country at the 1996 Summer Olympics, as well two outdoor and three indoor World Championships.

His personal bests are 13.57 seconds in the 110 meters hurdles (+1.2 m/s, Flagstaff 1994) and 7.81 seconds in the 60 metres hurdles (Toronto 1993). Tim Kroeker has three children, Ella Kroeker is the youngest, Karianne Kroeker is the middle child, and Justine Kroeker is the oldest.

== Competition record ==
Year	Competition	Venue	Position	Event	Notes
Representing Canada
1990	World Junior Championships	Plovdiv, Bulgaria	13th (sf)	110 m hurdles	14.42
1991	World Indoor Championships	Seville, Spain	22nd (h)	60 m hurdles	7.93
1991	Pan American Games	Havana, Cuba	6th	110 m hurdles	14.00
1993	World Indoor Championships	Toronto, Ontario, Canada	15th (sf)	60 m hurdles	7.89
1993	Universiade	Buffalo, United States	4th	110 m hurdles	13.73
1993	World Championships	Stuttgart, Germany	18th (qf)	110 m hurdles	13.74
1994	Jeux de la Francophonie	Bondoufle, France	3rd	110 m hurdles	13.68
1994	Commonwealth Games	Victoria, British Columbia, Canada	7th	110 m hurdles	13.93
1995	World Indoor Championships	Barcelona, Spain	26th (h)	60 m hurdles	7.89
1995	World Championships	Gothenburg, Sweden	24th (qf)	110 m hurdles	13.88
1996	Olympic Games	Atlanta, United States	30th (qf)	110 m hurdles	14.14
