= Jyrki Kähkönen =

Finnish hurdler

Jyrki Kähkönen (born 5 June 1967) is a retired Finnish athlete who specialized in the 110 metres hurdles.

He competed at the 1994 European Championships and the 1995 World Championships without reaching the final round.

His personal best time was 13.65 seconds, which he achieved at the 1994 European Championships in August 1994 in Helsinki.
