= Aleksandr Yenko =

Moldovan hurdler

Aleksandr Yenko (born 17 August 1972) is a Moldovan athlete who specialized in the 110 metres hurdles.

He competed at the 1995 World Indoor Championships without reaching the final.

His personal bests are 13.58 seconds in the 110 metres hurdles, achieved in July 1995 in Gomel, and 7.84 seconds in the 60 metres hurdles, achieved in February 1995 in Sofia. Both are standing Moldovan records.

== Competition record ==
Year	Competition	Venue	Position	Event	Notes
Representing Moldova
1994	European Indoor Championships	Paris, France	32nd (h)	60 m hurdles	8.10
1995	World Indoor Championships	Barcelona, Spain	32nd (h)	60 m hurdles	7.97
1995	World Championships	Gothenburg, Sweden	39th (h)	110 m hurdles	13.97
1996	European Indoor Championships	Stockholm, Sweden	20th (h)	60 m hurdles	8.02
