= Li Tong (hurdler) =

Chinese hurdler (born 1967)

Personal information
- Born: 6 May 1967 (age 59) Beijing, China

Sport
- Sport: Track and field
- Club: Washington State Cougars
Medal record
Representing China
Asian Games
Gold medal – first place	1994 Hiroshima	110 m hurdles
Asian Championships
Gold medal – first place	1993 Manila	110 m hurdles

Li Tong (李彤, born 6 May 1967) is a Chinese former hurdler who competed in the 1992 Summer Olympics and in the 1996 Summer Olympics.

Running for Washington State, he was the 1990-1 NCAA Indoor Champion for 55 meter hurdles.

== Competition record ==
Year	Competition	Venue	Position	Event	Notes
Representing China
1986	World Junior Championships	Athens, Greece	53rd (h)	100 m	11.08 (wind: +1.7 m/s)
1986	World Junior Championships	Athens, Greece	7th	Long jump	7.59 m
1986	Asian Junior Championships	Jakarta, Indonesia	3rd	Long jump	7.70 m
1987	Universiade	Zagreb, Yugoslavia	16th (q)	Long jump	7.45 m
1990	Goodwill Games	Seattle, United States	7th	110 m hurdles	14.05
1991	World Championships	Tokyo, Japan	8th	110 m hurdles	13.46
1992	Olympic Games	Barcelona, Spain	9th (sf)	110 m hurdles	13.62
1993	World Indoor Championships	Toronto, Canada	10th (sf)	60 m hurdles	7.76
1993	World Championships	Stuttgart, Germany	13th (sf)	110 m hurdles	13.59
1993	Asian Championships	Manila, Philippines	1st	110 m hurdles	13.49
1994	World Cup	London, United Kingdom	5th	110 m hurdles	13.59
1994	Asian Games	Hiroshima, Japan	1st	110 m hurdles	13.30
1995	World Indoor Championships	Barcelona, Spain	8th (sf)	60 m hurdles	7.66
1996	Olympic Games	Atlanta, United States	15th (sf)	110 m hurdles	13.60
1997	World Indoor Championships	Paris, France	8th (sf)	60 m hurdles	7.72
1997	World Championships	Athens, Greece	32nd (h)	110 m hurdles	13.89
