= Chen Yanhao =

Chinese hurdler (born 1972)

Medal record

Men's athletics

Representing China

Asian Championships
Gold medal – first place	1998 Fukuoka	110 m hurdles
Gold medal – first place	1995 Jakarta	110 m hurdles
Silver medal – second place	1993 Manila	110 m hurdles

Chen Yanhao (born 2 January 1972) is a retired Chinese hurdler who competed in the 1996 Summer Olympics.

He won the bronze medal at the 1990 Asian Junior Championships, the silver medal at the 1993 Asian Championships, the silver medal at the 1994 Asian Games, the gold medal at the 1995 and 1998 Asian Championships and the 1998 Asian Games and also the silver medals at the 1997 and 2001 East Asian Games.

On the world stage he finished fifth at the 1998 IAAF World Cup and competed at the 1995 World Indoor Championships, the 1996 Olympic Games, the 1997 World Indoor Championships and the 1999 World Championships without reaching the final.

His personal best time was 13.37 seconds, achieved in May 2001 in Shanghai.
