= Igor Kováč =

Czechoslovak hurdler

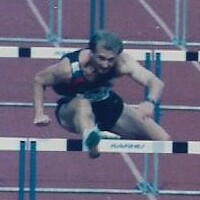

Personal information
- Born: 12 May 1969 (age 57) Krompachy, Czechoslovakia
- Height: 1.83 m (6 ft 0 in)
- Weight: 78 kg (172 lb)

Sport
- Sport: Track and field
- Event: 110 metres hurdles
- Club: Dukla Banská Bystrica
Medal record
Men's Athletics
Representing Slovakia
World Championships
Bronze medal – third place	1997 Athens	110 m hurdles

Igor Kováč (born May 12, 1969) is a former Slovak track and field athlete who specialised in the 110 metres hurdles. He is best known for winning the bronze medal at the 1997 World Championships in Athens. In addition, he competed at the 1992 Olympics for Czechoslovakia and the 1996 Olympics for Slovakia.

== International competitions ==
Year	Competition	Venue	Position	Event	Notes
Representing Czechoslovakia
1990	European Indoor Championships	Glasgow, United Kingdom	21st (h)	60 m hurdles	7.99
1990	European Championships	Split, Yugoslavia	18th (h)	110 m hurdles	14.06
1991	Universiade	Sheffield, United Kingdom	4th	110 m hurdles	13.87
1991	World Championships	Tokyo, Japan	13th (sf)	110 m hurdles	13.89
1992	European Indoor Championships	Genoa, Italy	16th (sf)	60 m hurdles	9.14
1992	Olympic Games	Barcelona, Spain	30th (h)	110 m hurdles	14.12
Representing Slovakia
1993	World Indoor Championships	Toronto, Canada	14th (sf)	60 m hurdles	7.84
1993	World Championships	Stuttgart, Germany	24th (sf)	110 m hurdles	14.02
1994	European Indoor Championships	Paris, France	5th	60 m hurdles	7.61
1994	European Championships	Helsinki, Finland	19th (h)	110 m hurdles	13.72
1995	World Indoor Championships	Barcelona, Spain	12th (sf)	60 m hurdles	7.75
1995	World Championships	Gothenburg, Sweden	8th (sf)	110 m hurdles	13.45
1996	Olympic Games	Atlanta, United States	25th (h)	110 m hurdles	13.70
1997	World Indoor Championships	Paris, France	5th	60 m hurdles	7.59
1997	World Championships	Athens, Greece	3rd	110 m hurdles	13.18
1999	World Indoor Championships	Maebashi, Japan	8th	60 m hurdles	7.81
1999	World Championships	Seville, Spain	20th (qf)	110 m hurdles	13.56
2000	European Indoor Championships	Ghent, Belgium	14th (sf)	60 m hurdles	7.80
