= Emilio Valle =

Cuban hurdler (born 1967)

Personal information
- Born: 21 April 1967 (age 59) Sancti Spíritus, Cuba

Sport
- Sport: Track and field
Medal record
Representing Cuba
Summer Universiade
| Silver medal – second place | 1989 Duisburg | 110m hurdles |
Pan American Games
| Silver medal – second place | 1995 Mar del Plata | 110m hurdles |
Central American and Caribbean Games
| Gold medal – first place | 1990 Mexico City | 110m hurdles |
| Gold medal – first place | 1993 Ponce | 110m hurdles |
| Silver medal – second place | 1998 Maracaibo | 400m hurdles |
| Bronze medal – third place | 1990 Mexico City | 4x400m relay |
World Junior Championships
| Gold medal – first place | 1986 Athens | 400m hurdles |
| Bronze medal – third place | 1986 Athens | 110m hurdles |

Emilio Valle (born 21 April 1967) is a Cuban retired hurdler.

His personal best time was 13.18 seconds, achieved in the semi-final at the 1996 Summer Olympics in Atlanta. The result places him third among Cuban 110 m hurdlers, behind Anier García and Dayron Robles.

== International competitions ==
| Year | Competition | Venue | Position | Event | Notes |
Representing Cuba
| 1986 | Central American and Caribbean; Junior Championships (U-20) | Mexico City, Mexico | 1st | 110 m hurdles | 14.12 A |
| 1986 | Central American and Caribbean; Junior Championships (U-20) | Mexico City, Mexico | 1st | 400 m hurdles | 50.66 A |
| 1986 | World Junior Championships | Athens, Greece | 3rd | 110m hurdles | 14.00 (-0.8 m/s) |
| 1986 | World Junior Championships | Athens, Greece | 1st | 400m hurdles | 50.02 |
| 1986 | World Junior Championships | Athens, Greece | 11th | Decathlon | 7090 pts |
| 1986 | World Junior Championships | Athens, Greece | 4th | 4 × 100 m relay | 40.30 |
| 1988 | Ibero-American Championships | Mexico City, Mexico | 1st | 110m hurdles | 13.71 (0.0 m/s) A |
| 1989 | World Indoor Championships | Budapest, Hungary | 5th | 60 m hurdles | 7.71 |
| 1989 | Central American and Caribbean Championships | San Juan, Puerto Rico | 1st | 110 m hurdles | 13.48 |
| 1989 | Central American and Caribbean Championships | San Juan, Puerto Rico | 2nd | 4 × 100 m relay | 39.89 |
| 1989 | Universiade | Duisburg, Germany | 2nd | 110 m hurdles | 13.52 (-1.4 m/s) |
| 1989 | World Cup | Barcelona, Spain | 3rd | 110 m hurdles | 13.21^{1} |
| 1990 | Central American and Caribbean Games | Mexico City, Mexico | 1st | 110 m hurdles | 13.64 A |
| 1990 | Central American and Caribbean Games | Mexico City, Mexico | 3rd | 4 × 400 m relay | 3:06.17 |
| 1991 | World Indoor Championships | Seville, Spain | 4th | 60 m hurdles | 7.60 |
| 1991 | Pan American Games | Havana, Cuba | 4th | 110 m hurdles | 13.94 |
| 1992 | Ibero-American Championships | Seville, Spain | 1st | 110m hurdles | 13.41 (-0.6 m/s) |
| 1992 | Olympic Games | Barcelona, Spain | 6th | 110 m hurdles | 13.41 |
| 1992 | World Cup | Havana, Cuba | 3rd | 110 m hurdles | 13.69 (+0.3 m/s) |
| 1993 | World Indoor Championships | Toronto, Canada | 7th | 60 m hurdles | 7.74 |
| 1993 | World Championships | Stuttgart, Germany | 4th | 110 m hurdles | 13.19 PB |
| 1993 | Central American and Caribbean Games | Ponce, Puerto Rico | 1st | 110 m hurdles | 13.87 |
| 1994 | Goodwill Games | Saint Petersburg, Russia | 3rd | 110 m hurdles | 13.35 |
| 1994 | World Cup | London, United Kingdom | 3rd | 110 m hurdles | 13.71 |
| 1995 | World Indoor Championships | Barcelona, Spain | 5th | 60 m hurdles | 7.67 |
| 1995 | World Championships | Gothenburg, Sweden | 8th | 110 m hurdles | 13.43 (-0.1 m/s) |
| 1995 | Pan American Games | Mar del Plata, Argentina | 2nd | 110 m hurdles | 13.40 |
| 1996 | Olympic Games | Atlanta, United States | 5th | 110 m hurdles | 13.20 (+0.6 m/s) |
| 1998 | Central American and Caribbean Games | Maracaibo, Venezuela | 2nd | 400 m hurdles | 49.66 PB |

^{1}Representing the Americas
