= Masanori Inoue =

Japanese sportsman (born 1972)

Personal information
- Nationality: Japanese
- Born: 1 May 1972 (age 54) Yachiyo, Japan

Sport
- Sport: Bobsleigh

Masanori Inoue (井上 将憲, Inoue Masanori; born 1 May 1972) is a Japanese hurdler and bobsledder. He competed at the 1998 Winter Olympics and the 2002 Winter Olympics.
