= Tony Dees =

American hurdler (born 1963)

Personal information
- Born: Anthony Michael Dees; August 6, 1963 (age 63) Pascagoula, Mississippi, U.S.
Medal record
Men's athletics
Representing the United States
Olympic Games
Silver medal – second place	1992 Barcelona	110 m hurdles
World Indoor Championships
Bronze medal – third place	1993 Toronto	60m hurdles
Bronze medal – third place	1997 Paris	60m hurdles
Summer Universiade
Gold medal – first place	1989 Duisburg	4x100m relay

Anthony Michael Dees (born August 6, 1963) is a former American hurdler.

Dees won the silver medal at the 1992 Summer Olympics in Barcelona behind Mark McKoy. He then finished third at the 1993 World Indoor Championships, eighth at the 1993 World Championships, third again at the 1997 World Indoor Championships and fourth at the 1999 World Championships. 5 times indoor national champion 60 meter hurdles He attended the University of Mississippi, and finished his education at Turabo University in Caguas, Puerto Rico.

Dees also was 5 time indoor 60 meter hurdles national champion. Dees ranked #2 in the world in 1991, #3 in the world in 1992 and 1993 in 110 meter hurdles. Dees ended his career at age 38 by posting an impressive 60 meter hurdle best of 7.37 seconds.

Another one of his accomplishments is coaching the University School in Cross Country and leading them to their first ever Boys and Girls trip to the regionals in the school's history. Dees also took four track and field athletes to the state championships which were held in Gainesville at The University of Florida.

Dees was inducted into the Ole Miss track hall of fame by coach Joe Walker at The University Of Mississippi. (Ole Miss)

Dees received two anti-doping bans during his career, with the second resulting in a lifetime suspension. Both bans were for testing positive for nandrolone. His first positive test for the substance occurred at the 2001 USA Indoor Track and Field Championships, which resulted in a two-year suspension. While serving this ban, Dees tested positive again for nandrolone at the Norwich Union Grand Prix in the Birmingham, UK and in a subsequent out-of-competition test in Florida. According to the anti-doping rules at the time, he was issued him a lifetime ban from competition for having received two positive tests.

== Personal bests ==
- 110 metres hurdles – 13.05 s (1991)
- 100 metres – 10.15 s (1991)
- 200 metres – 20.54 s (1984)

== Rankings ==
Dees was ranked among the best in the US and the world in the 100m hurdles event from 1990 to 2000, according to the votes of the experts of Track and Field News.

110 m hurdles
Year	World rank	US rank
1990	2nd	2nd
1991	2nd	2nd
1992	3rd	1st
1993	5th	2nd
1994	-	6th
1995	9th	6th
1996	-	8th
1997	-	6th
1998	-	10th
1999	10th	5th
2000	-	9th

Sporting positions
Preceded by (United Kingdom) Colin Jackson	Men's 110m Hurdles Best Year Performance; 1991	Succeeded by (United Kingdom) Colin Jackson
