= Antonio Lanau =

Spanish hurdler (born 1966)

Personal information
- Born: 14 February 1966 (age 60) Catalonia, Spain

Sport
- Sport: Track and field

Antonio "Toni" Lanau (born 14 February 1966) is a retired Spanish hurdler who specialized in the 110 metres hurdles.

He competed at the 1987 World Championships, the 1988 European Indoor Championships, the 1994 European Indoor Championships and the 1995 World Indoor Championships without reaching the final.

On the regional level he finished eighth at the 1991 Mediterranean Games and also at the 1992 Ibero-American Championships. He became Spanish champion in 1994 and 1995, and indoor champion in 1994; Spanish high hurdles was otherwise dominated by Carlos Sala. His personal best time was 13.72 seconds, achieved in August 1987 in Barcelona.
