= Colin Jackson =

Welsh athlete (born 1967)

Colin Jackson CBE
- Jackson at the 2026 Weltklasse Zürich

Personal information
- Nationality: British
- Born: 18 February 1967 (age 59) Cardiff, Wales
- Height: 1.82 m (5 ft 11 1/2 in)
- Weight: 75 kg (165 lb; 11.8 st)

Sport
- Sport: Running, hurdling
- Club: Brecon Athletics Club
Medal record
Men's athletics
Representing Great Britain
Event	1st	2nd	3rd
Olympic Games	0	1	0
World Championships	2	2	1
World Indoor Championships	1	3	0
European Championships	4	0	0
European Indoor Championships	4	1	0
World U20 Championships	1	0	0
European U20 Championships	0	1	0
Total	12	8	1
Olympic Games
Silver medal – second place	1988 Seoul	110 m hurdles
World Championships
Gold medal – first place	1993 Stuttgart	110 m hurdles
Gold medal – first place	1999 Seville	110 m hurdles
Silver medal – second place	1993 Stuttgart	4 × 100 m relay
Silver medal – second place	1997 Athens	110 m hurdles
Bronze medal – third place	1987 Rome	110 m hurdles
World Indoor Championships
Gold medal – first place	1999 Maebashi	60 m hurdles
Silver medal – second place	1989 Budapest	60 m hurdles
Silver medal – second place	1993 Toronto	60 m hurdles
Silver medal – second place	1997 Paris	60 m hurdles
European Championships
Gold medal – first place	1990 Split	110 m hurdles
Gold medal – first place	1994 Helsinki	110 m hurdles
Gold medal – first place	1998 Budapest	110 m hurdles
Gold medal – first place	2002 Munich	110 m hurdles
European Indoor Championships
Gold medal – first place	1989 The Hague	60 m hurdles
Gold medal – first place	1994 Paris	60 m
Gold medal – first place	1994 Paris	60 m hurdles
Gold medal – first place	2002 Vienna	60 m hurdles
Silver medal – second place	1987 Lievin	60 m hurdles
Representing Wales
Event	1st	2nd	3rd
Commonwealth Games	2	2	0
Total	2	2	0
Commonwealth Games
Gold medal – first place	1990 Auckland	110 m hurdles
Gold medal – first place	1994 Victoria	110 m hurdles
Silver medal – second place	1986 Edinburgh	110 m hurdles
Silver medal – second place	2002 Manchester	110 m hurdles

Colin Ray Jackson, CBE (born 18 February 1967) is a Welsh former sprint and hurdling athlete, sports commentator and television personality who specialised in the 110 metres hurdles. During a career in which he represented Great Britain and Wales, he won an Olympic silver medal, became world champion twice, world indoor champion once, was undefeated at the European Championships for 12 years and was twice Commonwealth champion. His world record of 12.91 seconds for the 110 m hurdles stood for nearly 13 years and his 60 metres hurdles world record stood for nearly 27 years.

== Biography ==
Jackson won his first major medal, a silver, in the 110 m hurdles, aged 19 at the 1986 Commonwealth Games. He soon established himself on the global scene, taking bronze at the 1987 World Championships in Athletics and a silver medal at the 1988 Summer Olympics. After winning another silver in the 60 m hurdles at the 1989 IAAF World Indoor Championships, he won European and Commonwealth gold medals in 1990. The 1993 season saw him reach the pinnacle of his sport: after a silver at the 1993 Indoor Worlds, he set a world record of 12.91 seconds to become the 1993 World Champion. This record was unbeaten for almost 13 years and remains the world championship record. Jackson was part of the British 4 × 100 metres relay team which won the world silver medal.

This period was Jackson's most successful: he had a streak of 44 races undefeated between 1993 and 1995. In addition to European and Commonwealth golds outdoors in 1994, he set another world record, running 7.30 seconds in the 60 m hurdles. A double gold at the 1994 European Athletics Indoor Championships in the 60 m hurdles and sprint events saw him set a European record of 6.49 seconds over 60 m. Injury affected his 1995–1996 seasons and he finished only fourth at the 1996 Olympics. He returned to competition in 1997 and took silver twice – at the Indoor World Championships and the World Outdoors. After winning the European Championships for a third consecutive time in 1998 he became indoor and outdoor World champion in 1999. He finished fifth at the 2000 Summer Olympics and his last major medals came in 2002, taking European indoor and outdoor gold and a Commonwealth silver.

After a period of sports management and coaching, he now works as a sports commentator for athletics and as a television presenter (predominantly for the BBC). He is a well-known face on British television, having been on Strictly Come Dancing in 2005, as well as a number of other entertainment and factual TV programmes.

== Early life ==
Jackson, born in Cardiff, Wales, is of Jamaican descent through his parents also having maternal grandparents that migrated to Panama. A DNA test indicated his ancestry is mostly African and European with some North American Indigenous ancestry, suggesting descent from Jamaican Maroons and Taínos. Genealogical research shows his Panamanian-born Jamaican mother had Scottish ancestry. He is the brother of actress Suzanne Packer who played Tess Bateman in the BBC One hospital drama Casualty. Jackson grew up in Birchgrove, attending Springwood Primary School and then Llanedeyrn High School. He played football and cricket for the county and rugby union and basketball for his school and joined the athletics club Birchgrove Harriers, which nurtured his talent. As captain of his school cricket team, he and four team-mates were invited to trials for the Welsh national cricket team: whilst his team-mates were all picked, Jackson was passed over – he attributed this to racism, and has said it resulted in him quitting the sport and focusing on athletics, as "athletics had more people that looked like me". Jackson has also stated he felt discriminated against by British Athletics for selections and sponsorship. He said: "I felt the discrimination was because I was Welsh more than anything else."

== Athletics career ==
Under coach and close friend Malcolm Arnold, Jackson started out as a promising decathlete before switching to high hurdles. He won gold at the 1986 World Junior Championships and he soon switched to the senior ranks. Following a silver medal in the 1986 Commonwealth Games, he won the 110 m hurdles silver at the 1988 Olympic Games behind Roger Kingdom. Although his career as an active competitor in the event would last a further fifteen years, the last ten of these as world record holder, and see him twice crowned World Champion, twice Commonwealth Champion and four times European Champion, this would remain his only Olympic medal of any colour. In 1992 he eased through his first round heat in 13.10 s (which proved faster than the gold medal-winning time) but was restricted by an injury he picked up during the next round and could only finish seventh in the final. In 1996 he came fourth and then fifth in 2000.

He set his world record for the 110 metres hurdles on 20 August 1993, winning his first World Championships gold medal in Stuttgart, Germany in 12.91 s. The new mark (also a championship record) shaved 0.01 s off the previous record held by Kingdom and stood for nearly thirteen years, only being equalled by Liu Xiang in the 2004 Summer Olympics and finally beaten by the same man on 11 July 2006 at the Super Grand Prix in Lausanne with a time of 12.88 s. Jackson remained the sole holder of the indoor world record at the 60 metres hurdles with a time of 7.30 s set in Sindelfingen, Germany on 6 March 1994 until Grant Holloway ran 7.29 s in Madrid, Spain on 24 February 2021.

At the 1994 European Indoor Championships he became a double European champion, winning in both the 60 metres hurdles and 60 metres sprint race. His 60 m dash time of 6.49 s was a European record as well as a championship record. These records remained unbeaten for 5 years until Jason Gardener ran 6.46 s in 1999 in Maebashi, Japan.

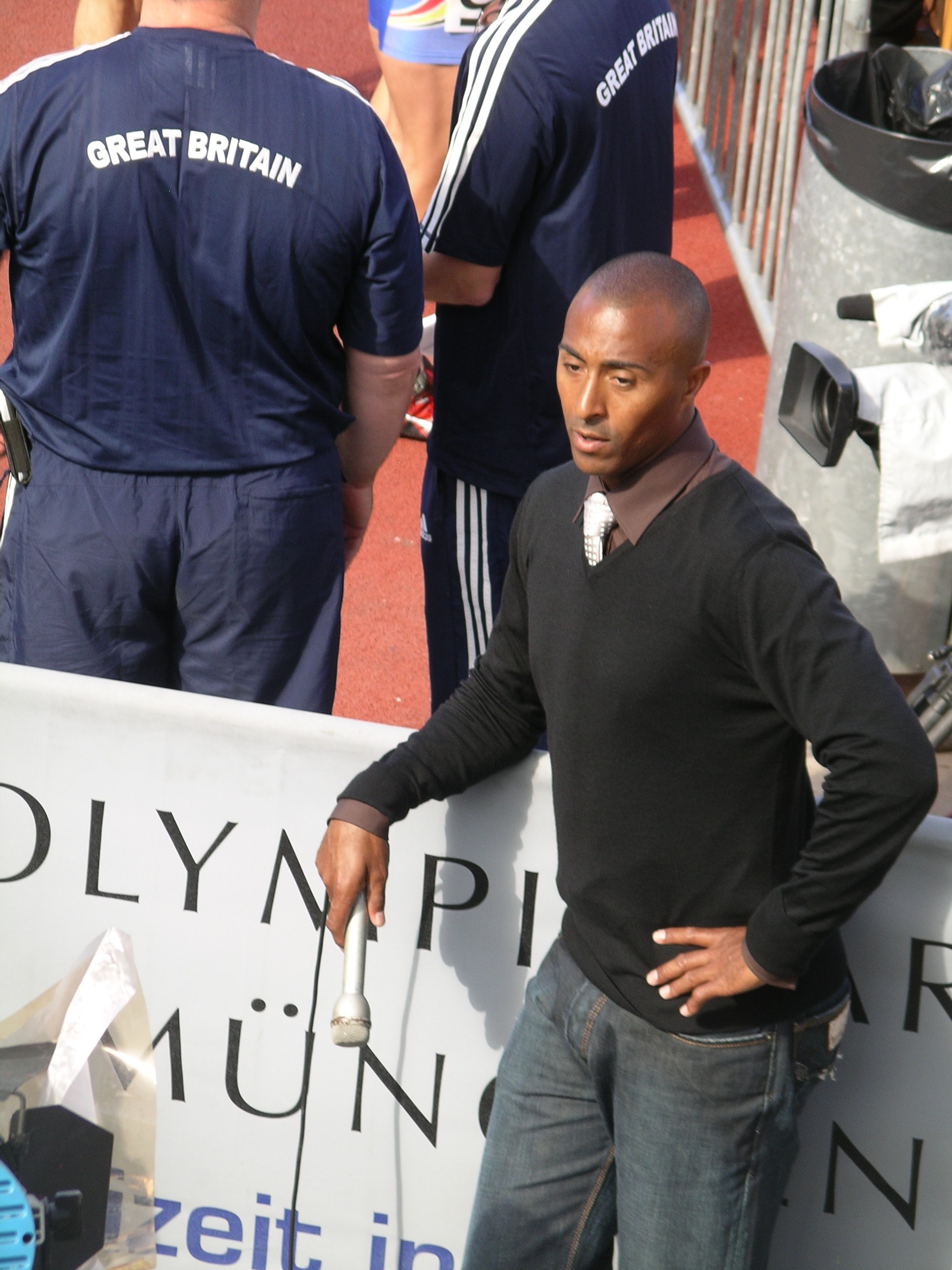
Jackson at the 2007 European Cup

The aforementioned achievements coincided with one of the high points of Jackson's career: he was unbeaten between 29 August 1993 and 9 February 1995. He won forty-four races consecutively in this period. His winning time at the 1994 Commonwealth Games was a Commonwealth Games record.

Jackson was a master of the "dip" – the skill of leaning forward at the end of a race to advance the position of the shoulders and improve times (and potentially positions). He was also renowned for being a particularly fast starter, which led to a great deal of success in 60 m events. Jackson's technical hurdling ability distinguished him from his peers whether they were faster than him or not.

He was the subject of controversy in 1998 when he decided to run for cash in Tokyo, Japan, rather than compete in the Commonwealth Games for Wales.

Six years after his first world title, Jackson regained his 110 m hurdles crown at the 1999 Seville World Championships. This was to be his last gold medal at the very highest level, but he added a final, fourth successive European Championships gold in the 2002 Munich European Championships, extending an unbroken reign as European Champion stretching back to 1990.

== Post-retirement career ==
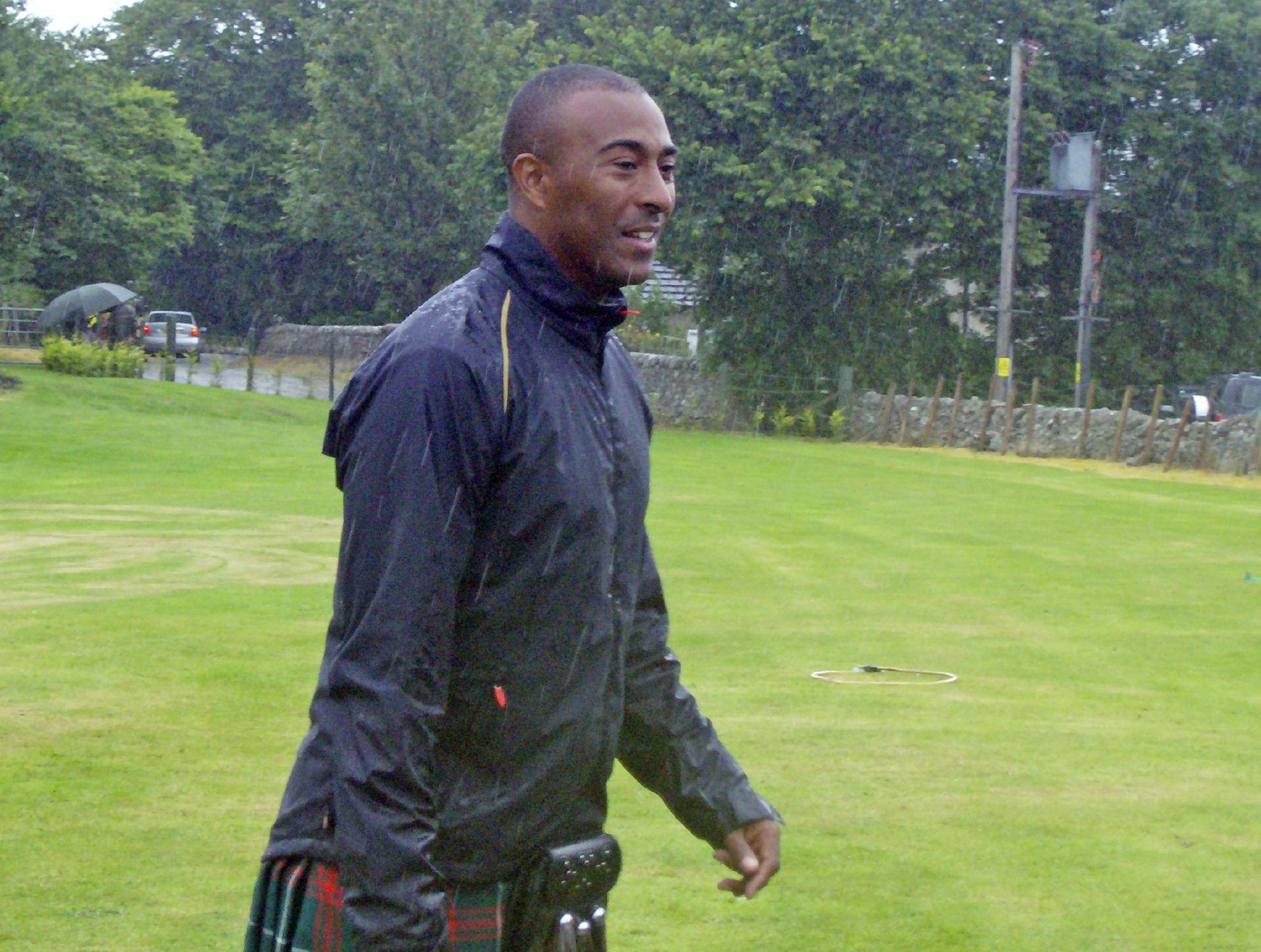
Jackson at the 2007 Highland Games

Since ending his athletics career at the 2003 World Indoor Championships Jackson has been involved in numerous endeavours, in athletics and other areas. He coached his close friend the swimmer Mark Foster until Foster's retirement in April 2016. He has coached two of Wales best Olympic prospects, 400 m runner Timothy Benjamin and 400 m hurdler Rhys Williams. He was also one of the members of the successful London 2012 Olympic bid team and is a key member of the BBC's televisions athletics coverage. However, he started his broadcasting career in 2004 by co-hosting, with Sally Gunnell, the BBC reality TV programme Born to Win.

Already the holder of the MBE that he received in 1990 for his services to athletics, in 2000 he was promoted to OBE and then in 2003 to a CBE.

The English reggae band Aswad name-checked him on their 1994 hit song "Shine": Him a floating like a butterfly, the hurdling man – Yes, me-a-chat about Colin Jackson.

Jackson has written three books: the first, The Young Track and Field Athlete, was published in March 1996 by Dorling Kindersley; his second, Colin Jackson: The Autobiography, was published in April 2004 by BBC Books; and his last, Life's New Hurdles, was published in March 2008 by Accent Press Ltd as part of the Quick Reads Initiative.

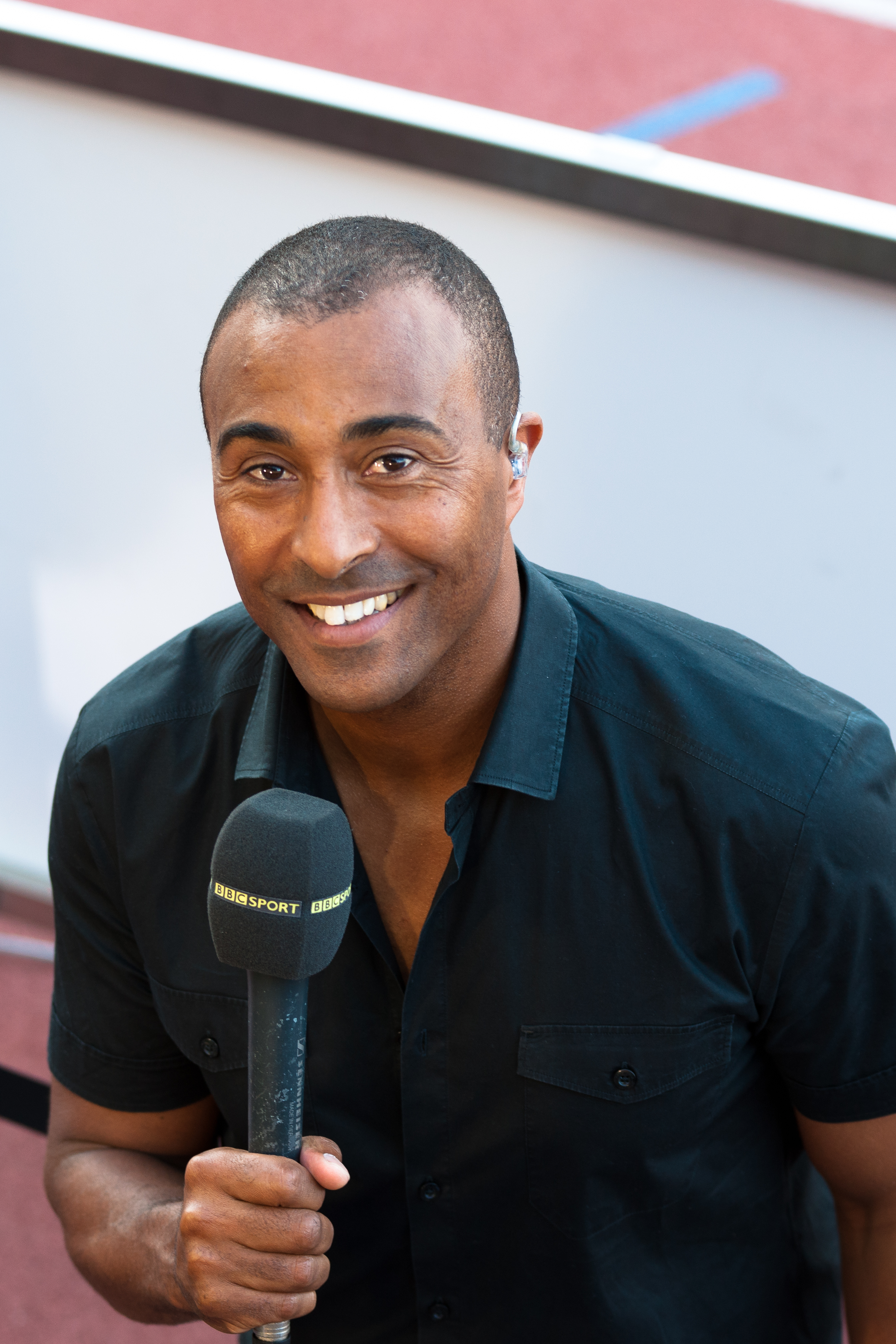
Jackson at the 2012 Athletissima.

Since 2014 Jackson has been the race director of the Wings for Life World Run.

In 2016, Jackson was awarded an Honorary Fellowship by Wrexham Glyndŵr University for his contribution to sport. Two years later, it was announced that Jackson would become Chancellor of the university. He officially took over the role from Trefor Jones on 1 January 2019 and was inaugurated on 15 February.

In January 2018, Jackson was one of six people who settled claims against News Group Newspapers related to the News International phone hacking scandal.

In February 2020, Jackson joined Edward Peck, Vice-Chancellor of Nottingham Trent University, and Afua Acheampong, Vice-President of Education at Nottingham Trent Students’ Union, to launch the Black Leadership Programme, an initiative to empower a new generation of black leaders.

In July 2022 he participated in the Commonwealth Games Queen's Baton Relay, carrying the baton into Basildon Sporting Village.

=== Media career ===
After retiring from athletics, he became the face of BBC Raise Your Game with Colin Jackson in which he talked to high-profile international stars about the importance of learning. Participants included Luol Deng, Jenson Button, Davina McCall, and stars from Strictly Come Dancing, to name but a few.

His work as a BBC athletics commentator and pundit began with the 2004 Athens Olympics. Since then he has been a regular member of the BBC team covering athletics events. In this role he has worked on six Summer Olympic Games: 2004 in Athens, 2008 in Beijing, 2012 in London, 2016 in Rio, 2020 in Tokyo and 2024 in Paris. He has also worked on five Commonwealth Games: as a roving reporter at 2006 in Melbourne and as a pundit and commentator at 2010 in Delhi, 2014 in Glasgow, 2018 in Gold Coast and 2022 in Birmingham. In addition, Jackson worked as a roving reporter for the BBC's coverage of the 2006 Winter Olympics in Turin.

He is a director of multimedia production company Red Shoes, along with fellow director and former BBC executive producer Richard Owen. Their clients include the IAAF and UEFA.

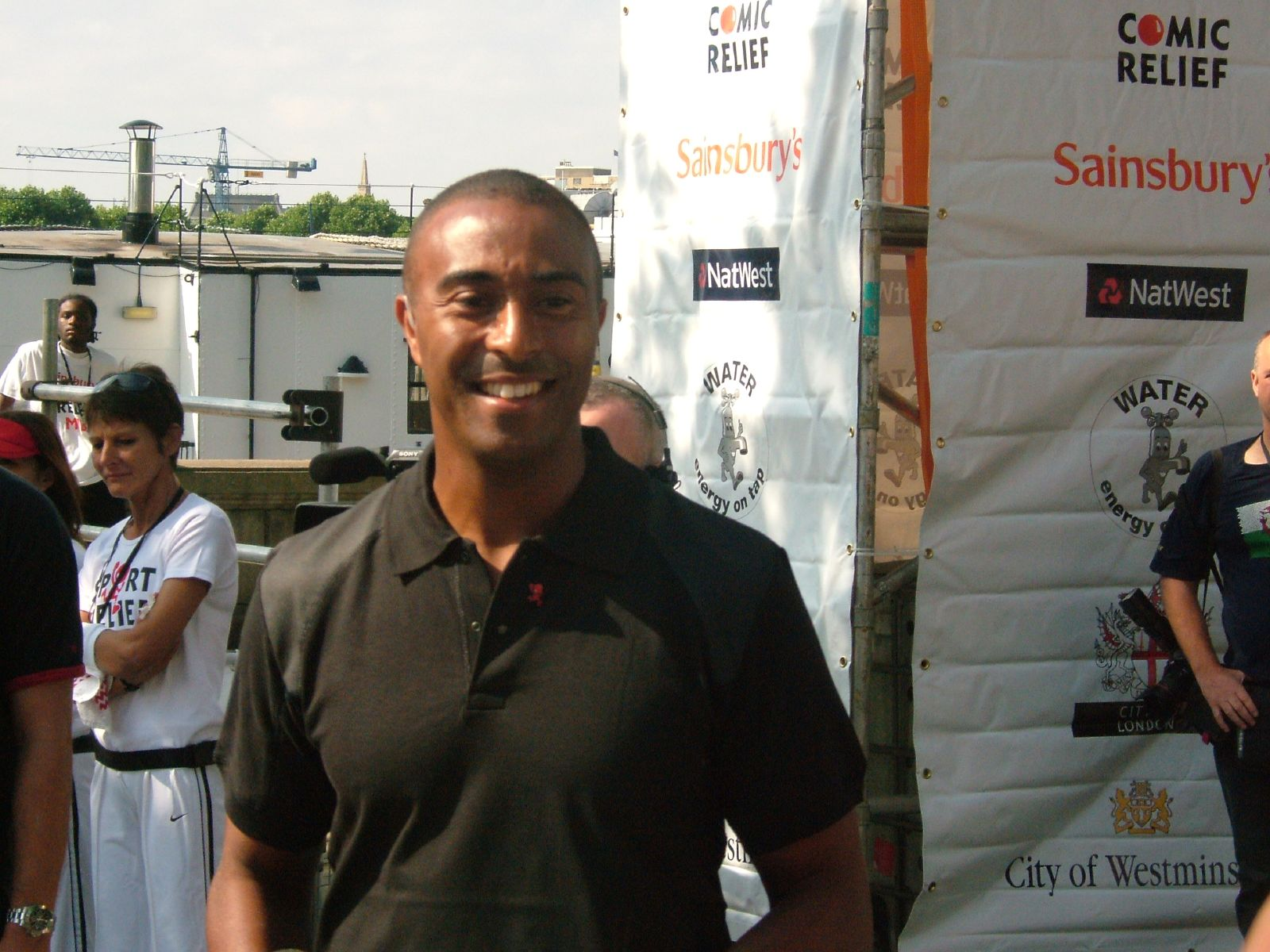
Jackson at a charity event in 2005

Jackson, who is of Jamaican descent, was the subject of an episode of the BBC TV genealogy series Who Do You Think You Are?, broadcast in the UK on 20 September 2006. Genetic tests showed his ancestry to be 55% African, 7% Native American (believed to be from Jamaican Maroon ancestry on his father's side), and 38% European. His mother was born in Panama, the daughter of Richard Augustus Packer and Gladys McGowan Campbell. Gladys Campbell was from Jamaica, the daughter of a Scottish man Duncan Campbell and his housemaid Albertina Wallace.

In March 2007 Jackson starred as the 'hidden celebrity' in an episode of the award-winning CBBC gameshow Hider in the House, hosted by Jason King and Joel Ross.

In 2008, Jackson co-hosted, with Louise Minchin, the Sunday morning show Sunday Life on BBC One.

Jackson appeared in the BBC One documentary The Making of Me on 31 July 2008 which attempted to find out what had made him such a talented athlete. A sample of his leg muscle showed that he had 25% super-fast twitch fibres when all previous athletes tested had only 2%. Although Jackson was brought up in the UK, he remembers his parents cheering on Don Quarrie to a silver medal at the 1976 Olympics and believes that influenced his career.

In 2009 Jackson shared his writing tips on the adult learning website "BBC raw words". He features in a comedy short with Nina Wadia, Rowland Rivron and Anneka Rice about structuring a story; he also shares his tips gained from writing Life's New Hurdles.

In 2010, Jackson was a competitor on the BBC television programme Celebrity MasterChef. He appeared in the second heat and, together with Christine Hamilton, progressed to the quarter-final. He reached Knockout Week but lost out to Hamilton and Neil Stuke in the first episode.

In 2012 Jackson made a cameo appearance as himself in an episode of the UK TV comedy drama Stella.

In February 2015, Jackson was announced as one of six celebrities taking part in the historical experience 24 Hours in the Past. The four-part series was broadcast on BBC One in April and May of the same year.

Jackson's podcast, titled Rethinking Our Responsibility For Our Health, was first broadcast on 24 June 2020.

=== Strictly Come Dancing ===
In 2005, Jackson appeared as one of the celebrity contestants on the BBC TV series Strictly Come Dancing. He came second with his dance partner Erin Boag, just losing out to cricketer Darren Gough.

A year later, he won the Strictly Come Dancing Christmas Special, becoming the first competitor who had not won the main series to win a Christmas edition.

In November 2017, Jackson was announced as one of the contestants for that year's Strictly Come Dancing Christmas Special. He partnered Amy Dowden and danced the rumba to Run by Leona Lewis, however the glitterball was won by Katie Derham and Brendan Cole.

=== Go Dad Run ===
In 2013 Jackson created his own charitable fundraising event for men, Go Dad Run. The purpose is to raise awareness of men's health issues and funds for male based charities Prostate Cancer UK, Bowel Cancer UK, Orchid and CALM plus local Cancer Care charities and hospices. Ambassadors include Mark Foster, Donovan Bailey, Suzanne Packer, Fernando Montano, Siân Lloyd and Jamie Baulch.

=== Sport 4 Kids ===
Jackson CBE joined Sport4Kids (S4K) as their International Director and Brand Ambassador.

=== Iaith ar Daith ===
In 2020 Jackson joined other celebrities in a new S4C television series called Iaith ar Daith ('Language Road Trip') in which they take a crash course in the Welsh language while travelling around Wales. At the end of the series he was interviewed in Welsh. The series was broadcast in April 2020. An extra episode, Iaith ar Daith 'Dolig ('Language Road Trip: Christmas') was broadcast at the end of 2020, interviewing each of the celebrities about whether they were still making use of their Welsh and the opportunities they had had to use Welsh during lockdown.

=== Dancing on Ice ===
In 2021, Jackson participated in the thirteenth series of Dancing on Ice. He was partnered with Klabera Komini and finished in 3rd Place.

=== Legends of Welsh Sport ===
In 2024, Kailash Films produced Colin Jackson: Resilience for BBC Cymru Wales. Featuring Jackson, his mother Angela, his sister Suzanne, trainer Malcolm Arnold, training partner and rival Mark McKoy, plus Daley Thompson and Sally Gunnell, the documentary covers Jackson's early life and athletics career but focuses primarily on the 1992 Olympic 110m hurdles event. The context is set with Angela saying: "I don't think anybody knew in that race what happened." The screen goes black and displays the text "Until now."

Jackson was widely considered the best opportunity for a British gold medal at the 1992 Olympic Games. "I was the favourite, no doubt," he says. He ran in the 1st heat of the opening round. According to McKoy watching ahead of his own heat, Jackson cleared 3 or 4 hurdles before easing down and coasting to a clear win in 13.10 s, the fastest time of the year. "It was jaw dropping, astonishing. We just looked at each other and said we know who's going to win. Who's going to get silver?"

Ahead of the next round, Jackson reveals: "I did nothing, I did no preparation at all. It's just the second round, they all see what I can do, I can't be bothered. Let me just do a bit of stretching and just race." Jackson, running in lane 6, had a good start but hit hurdles 3 and 5. Jack Pierce drew level over hurdle 6, then pulled away to win by several meters in 13.18 s. Jackson reveals: "I caught my trail leg and ended up ripping my left oblique. It's the muscle that kind of lifts your leg and helps you rotate and also stabilises. It's really an important part of your muscle group."

In the final, Jackson didn't have his customary good start and it was McKoy who led over hurdle 1. Jackson clipped hurdle 3 and appeared to stumble, then knocked down hurdle 4. He continued running but hit the last hurdle with his lead leg and nearly fell. McKoy maintained his advantage to win the gold medal in 13.12 s. Jackson, viewing the race on a tablet, gives a stark summary: "Once the muscle packs up, then that's it. It's all over." He concludes: "You never ever accept not becoming Olympic champion. You accept it if somebody's better than you, but I was the best."

Jackson admits that he took a long time to get over the disappointment of not becoming Olympic champion. He goes back into training in preparation for the 1993 World Championships. Gunnell identifies the opportunity: "I think it was lucky that there was a World Championships after Barcelona in Stuttgart. That's how you get over that disappointment, you have to have something to focus on. He wants the same guys there, he wants the best in the world."

Jackson cruised through his qualifying heat, then won his semi-final with a time of 13.13 s. Watching the final on a tablet, he recalls: "I just ran as fast as I could into the first hurdle. And I remember coming over the last hurdle thinking alleluia!" Jackson's winning time of 12.91 s. set a new world record that would stand for almost 13 years. "The Olympic Games the year before didn't matter. The emotions that you feel when you achieve and you bounce back after huge upset, the relief was more than anything else. I think once I broke the world record, won the world title, I felt complete... mission done."

The documentary became available on the BBC as an episode of Legends of Welsh Sport, Series 4 in January 2025.

== Personal life ==
On 26 August 2017, Jackson came out as gay in a clip on Swedish television promoting the series "Rainbow Heroes".

His eldest sister is Casualty actress Suzanne Packer.

== International competitions ==
Year	Competition	Venue	Position	Event	Result
Representing Great Britain and Wales
1985	European Indoor Championships	Piraeus, Greece	10th (sf)	60 m hurdles	7.85
1985	European Junior Championships	Cottbus, East Germany	2nd	110 m hurdles	13.69
1986	World Junior Championships	Athens, Greece	1st	110 m hurdles	13.44
1986	Commonwealth Games	Edinburgh, United Kingdom	2nd	110 m hurdles	13.42
1987	European Indoor Championships	Liévin, France	2nd	60 m hurdles	7.63
1987	World Indoor Championships	Indianapolis, United States	4th	60 m hurdles	7.68
1987	World Championships	Rome, Italy	3rd	110 m hurdles	13.38
1988	Olympic Games	Seoul, South Korea	2nd	110 m hurdles	13.28
1989	European Indoor Championships	The Hague (Netherlands)	1st	60 m hurdles	7.59
1989	World Indoor Championships	Budapest, Hungary	2nd	60 m hurdles	7.45
1989	World Cup	Barcelona, Spain	2nd	110 m hurdles	12.95 (w)
1990	Commonwealth Games	Auckland, New Zealand	1st	110 m hurdles	13.08
1990	European Championships	Split, Yugoslavia	1st	110 m hurdles	13.18
1991	World Championships	Tokyo, Japan	2nd (h)	110 m hurdles	13.25^{1}
1992	Olympic Games	Barcelona, Spain	7th	110 m hurdles	13.46
1992	World Cup	Havana, Cuba	1st	110 m hurdles	13.07
1993	World Indoor Championships	Toronto, Canada	2nd	60 m hurdles	7.43
1993	World Championships	Stuttgart, Germany	1st	110 m hurdles	12.91
1993	World Championships	Stuttgart, Germany	2nd	4 × 100 m relay	37.77
1994	European Indoor Championships	Paris, France	1st	60 m	6.49
1994	European Indoor Championships	Paris, France	1st	60 m hurdles	7.41
1994	Goodwill Games	St. Petersburg, Russia	1st	110 m hurdles	13.29
1994	Commonwealth Games	Victoria, Canada	1st	110 m hurdles	13.08
1994	European Championships	Helsinki, Finland	1st	110 m hurdles	13.08
1996	Olympic Games	Atlanta, United States	4th	110 m hurdles	13.19
1997	World Indoor Championships	Paris, France	2nd	60 m hurdles	7.49
1997	World Championships	Athens, Greece	2nd	110 m hurdles	13.05
1998	Goodwill Games	Uniondale, United States	4th	110 m hurdles	13.17
1998	European Championships	Budapest, Hungary	1st	110 m hurdles	13.02
1998	World Cup	Johannesburg, South Africa	2nd	110 m hurdles	13.11
1999	World Indoor Championships	Maebashi, Japan	1st	60 m hurdles	7.38
1999	World Championships	Seville, Spain	1st	110 m hurdles	13.04
2000	Olympic Games	Sydney, Australia	5th	110 m hurdles	13.28
2001	Goodwill Games	Brisbane, Australia	5th	110 m hurdles	13.63
2002	European Indoor Championships	Vienna, Austria	1st	60 m hurdles	7.40
2002	Commonwealth Games	Manchester, United Kingdom	2nd	110 m hurdles	13.39
2002	European Championships	Munich, Germany	1st	110 m hurdles	13.11
2003	World Indoor Championships	Birmingham, United Kingdom	5th	60 m hurdles	7.61

^{1}Did not start in the semifinals

Personal bests

Outdoor

- 110 metres hurdles – 12.91 sec (1993), former world record and current European record
- 200 metres hurdles – 22.63 sec (1991)
- 100 metres – 10.29 sec (1990)
- 200 metres – 21.19 sec (1988)
- High jump – 1.81 m (5 ft 11 1/4 in) (1982)
- Long jump – 7.56 m (24 ft 9 1/2 in) (1985)

Indoor

- 50 metres hurdles – 6.40 sec (1999), current British record
- 60 metres hurdles – 7.30 sec (1994), former world record
- 110 metres hurdles – 13.40 sec (2003)
- 60 metres – 6.49 sec (1994), former European record
- All information from IAAF profile.

== Bibliography ==
- Colin Jackson: The Autobiography (BBC Books, 2003)

Records
Preceded by Roger Kingdom	Men's 110 m Hurdles World Record Holder; 20 August 1993 – 11 July 2006	Succeeded by Liu Xiang
Preceded by Stéphane Caristan	Men's 110 m Hurdles European Record Holder; 20 August 1993 – present	Succeeded by Incumbent
Preceded by Roger Kingdom	Men's 60 m Hurdles Indoor World Record Holder; 6 March 1994 – 24 February 2021	Succeeded by Grant Holloway
Awards
Preceded by Linford Christie	Men's European Athlete of the Year; 1994	Succeeded by Jonathan Edwards
Sporting positions
Preceded by Roger Kingdom	Men's 110 m Hurdles Best Year Performance; 1990	Succeeded by Tony Dees
Preceded by Tony Dees	Men's 110 m Hurdles Best Year Performance; 1992—1994	Succeeded by Allen Johnson
