= Falk Balzer =

German hurdler (born 1973)

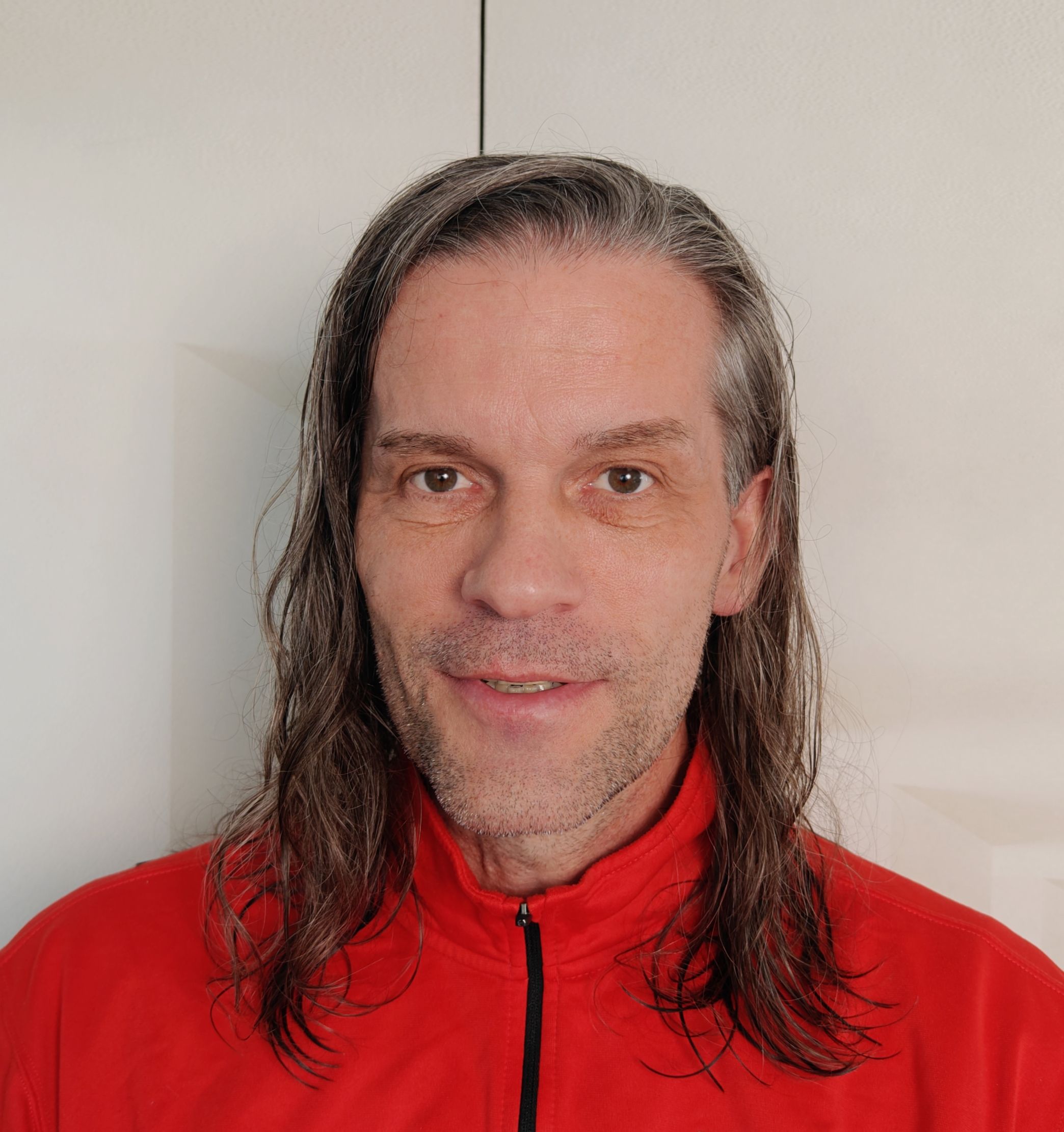
- Balzer at the Paris Olympic Games in 2024

Personal information
- Born: 14 December 1973 (age 52) Leipzig, Germany
- Height: 198 cm (6 ft 6 in)
- Weight: 85 kg (187 lb)

Sport
- Country: Germany
- Sport: Track and field
- Event: Hurdles
- Club: TUS Jena
- Coached by: Karin Balzer|Karl-Heinz Balzer

Achievements and titles
- Personal bests: 110 m hurdles: 13.10 (1998); Indoors; 60 m hurdles: 7.41 NR (1999)
Medal record
Men's athletics
Representing Germany
Event	1st	2nd	3rd
World Cup	1	0	0
World Indoor Championships	0	0	1
Military World Games	0	1	0
European Cup	2	1	0
European Championships	0	1	0
Total	3	3	1
IAAF Continental Cup
Gold medal – first place	1998 Johannesburg	110 m hurdles
World Indoor Championships
Bronze medal – third place	1999 Maebashi	60 m hurdles
Military World Games
Silver medal – second place	1999 Zagreb	110 m hurdles
European Championships
Silver medal – second place	1998 Budapest	110 m hurdles
European Cup
Gold medal – first place	1999 Paris	110 m hurdles
Gold medal – first place	2000 Gateshead	110 m hurdles
Silver medal – second place	1998 St. Petersburg	110 m hurdles

Falk Balzer (born 14 December 1973 in Leipzig) is a former German hurdler and the son of former East German hurdler Karin Balzer. He is best known for winning the silver medal at the 1998 European Championships in Budapest, Hungary and the bronze medal at the 1999 World Indoor Championships. He represented his native country at the 2000 Summer Olympics in Sydney, Australia. Falk Balzer is the German national record holder in the 60 m hurdles with a time of 7.41 s.

== Athletic career ==
During his entire career Falk Balzer was coached by his parents, Karin Balzer and Karl-Heinz Balzer. His first success in the 110 m hurdles was in 1989, where he won the bronze medal in the last GDR Spartakiad (GDR youth championships).

In 1994 he won the U23-European Cup in Ostrava in the 110 m hurdles.

In 1995 he finished sixth in the 110 m hurdles at the Universiade, where he also ran the 4 × 400 m relay.

In 1996 he won his first German Indoor Championships in the 60 m hurdles with a winning time of 7.53 s. In the 60 m hurdles of the European Indoor Championships he finished fourth.

In 1997 he competed in the 60 m hurdles at the World Indoor Championships in Paris, but was eliminated in the semifinals. At the German Championships he won bronze in the 110 m hurdles and qualified for the World Championships in Athens, where he ran a new personal best of 13.37 s in the heats. In the semifinals he hit the ninth hurdle which caused him to miss the final.

In 1998 Balzer set his first national indoor record in the 60 m hurdles of 7.47 s. That season he also won the German Indoor Championships in the 60 m hurdles at a winning time of 7.49 s. In the summer season he was the German national champion in the 110 m hurdles (13.28 s) and at the European Cup in Saint Petersburg he earned the silver medal in a new personal best of 13.22 s, just beaten by Colin Jackson. At an international meeting in Monte Carlo, he improved his personal best in the 110 m hurdles to 13.13 s and placed third behind Mark Crear and Allen Johnson. At the European Championships he finished second in the 110 m hurdles, behind Colin Jackson, in another new personal best of 13.12 s. It was the fastest 110 m hurdles final ever. Balzer won the World Cup in Johannesburg in the 110 m hurdles in his all-time best of 13.10 s.

In 1999 he improved his own national indoor record to 7.41 s in the 60 m hurdles. With this time he is the second fastest European all time in the 60 m hurdles. Later that season he finished third at the World Indoor Championships in a winning time of 7.44 s. Until today he is the only German who won a medal at world championships in the 60 m hurdles. In the 1999 summer season he won the European Cup in the 110 m hurdles and came fifth in the World Championships in Sevilla. He also competed in the 110 m hurdles at the Military World Games and won the silver medal behind Stanislav Olijars.

In 2000 he once again was the German Indoor Champion in the 60 m hurdles. After his victory he had a disagreement with the German Athletics Association which resulted in an official penalty. Later that year he finished fifth in the European Indoor Championships, won the European Cup and came third in the German Championships. At the 2000 Olympics in Sydney he had the chance to win a medal, due to his seasons best of 13.19 s, but he severely injured his elbow in the Olympics preparation camp, which caused him to be eliminated in the semifinals.

Balzer tested positive for nandrolone in January 2001 (10.2 ng). Differences in urine density and PH-value of the submitted and analyzed urine sample were not considered relevant by the German Athletics Association. A DNA analysis only confirmed a possible connection to Falk Balzer, but no 100% match. On the same day of the positive test Balzer had a blood test. The additional testing of the blood sample was rejected by the German Athletics Association. In spite of these doubts the German Athletics Federation subsequently handed him a two-year doping ban.

In 2003 he gave his comeback at the German Indoor Championships, resulting in a fifth position in the 60 m hurdles. He was then diagnosed with Epstein-Barr virus, but still managed to get silver at the German Championships in the 110 m hurdles in summer.

In 2004 Balzer ran the 110 m hurdles at a competition in Cuxhaven, when he hit the ninth hurdle and fell. This caused a partial tear in his right Achilles tendon. Despite this injury he managed to still run a 13,61 s in the 110 m hurdles in Lausanne later that season. During the warm-up for the German Championships his Achilles tendon completely tore. This ended his career. In 2008 and 2011 Falk Balzer competed again, but was not able to return to his old performances. In 2008 he got fourth in the 110 m hurdles at the German Championships and in 2011 he was fifth in the 60 m hurdles at the German Indoor Championships.

== Coaching ==
Starting in 1998, Balzer coached - in cooperation with his parents Karin Balzer and Karl-Heinz Balzer – the 400 m runner Anja Rücker. In 1999 she earned silver in the 400 m at the World Championships in Sevilla in a new personal best of 49,74 s.

2016 to 2017 he coached the two-time world champion in the 400 m hurdles, Zuzanna Hejnova. During the indoor season of 2017 Hejnova achieved a new personal best in the 60 m hurdles of 8.25 s. During that season she also competed in the 400 m at the European Indoor Championships and won the silver medal.

In 2018 Balzer started coaching Georg Fleischhauer, previously a 400 m hurdler, in the high hurdles and as a bobsleigh breakman. During the German Championships Fleischhauer came third in 2020 and 2021, both in the 110 m hurdles, and in 2021 he came second in the 60 m hurdles at the German Indoor Championships. In 2023 Fleischhauer won the World Championships in the two-man-bobsleigh, as the breakman of Johannes Lochner.

== Personal life ==
Balzer is the son of Karin Balzer, Olympic Champion of 1964 in the 80 m hurdles and winner of the Olympic bronze medal in the 100 m hurdles in 1972. Karin Balzer set 7 world records and was the first woman run below 13 s in the 100 m hurdles. She was coached by her husband Karl-Heinz Balzer.

Balzer studied German and History and was awarded a master's degree in both disciplines.

In 1999 he was awarded the Badge of Honour of the Bundeswehr in silver.

== Personal bests ==
60 m hurdles (indoors): 7.41 s NR (29 January 1999 in Chemnitz, Germany)

110 m hurdles: 13.10 s (13 September 1998 in Johannesburg, South Africa)

On 7 February 1999 Balzer ran the 60 m hurdles in Stuttgart, Germany in a winning time of 7.34 s – only 0.04 s slower than Colin Jackson's world indoor record at that time. Right after the race, Falk Balzer annulled the race himself, since he assumed a false start by himself. The jury on site considered the race valid and with that Balzer's winning time of 7.34 s. Almost two hours later a jury by the IAAF annulled the entire race since the video recording showed several other athletes, who also had false starts. The race still showed that Balzer was able to run below 7.40 s at that time.

== Achievements ==
1989: 3rd GDR Spartakiad (GDR youth championships)

1994: U23-European Cup Winner (110 m hurdles)

1995: 6th at Universiade (110 m hurdles)

1996: German Indoor Champion (60 m hurdles), 4th at European Indoor Championships (60 m hurdles)

1997: World Indoor Championships semifinalist (60 m hurdles), 3rd at German Championships (110 m hurdles), World Championships semifinalist (110 m hurdles)

1998: German Indoor Champion (60 m hurdles), German Champion (110 m hurdles), 2nd at European Cup (110 m hurdles), 2nd at European Championships (110 m hurdles), World Cup winner (110 m hurdles)

1999: 3rd at World Indoor Championships (60 m hurdles), European Cup Winner (110 m hurdles), 2nd at Military World Games (110 m hurdles), 5th at World Championships (110 m hurdles)

2000: German Indoor Champion (60 m hurdles), 5th at European Indoor Championships (60 m hurdles), European Cup winner (110 m hurdles), 3rd at German Championships (110 m hurdles), Olympics semifinalist (110 m hurdles)

2003: 2nd at German Championships (110 m hurdles)

2008: 4th at German Championships (110 m hurdles)

2011: 5th at German Indoor Championships (60 m hurdles)
