= Jonathan Nsenga =

Belgian hurdler (born 1973)

Personal information
- Born: 21 April 1973 (age 53) Mons, Belgium

Sport
- Sport: Track and field
Medal record
Representing Belgium
European Indoor Championships
Bronze medal – third place	1996 Stockholm	60 m hurdles
Summer Universiade
Gold medal – first place	1995 Fukuoka	110 m hurdles
Silver medal – second place	1997 Catania	110 m hurdles
Silver medal – second place	1999 Palma de Mallorca	110 m hurdles

Jonathan Nsenga (born 21 April 1973) is a retired Belgian hurdler.

He was born in Mons and represented the club OCAN. In his early career he won the silver medal at the 1994 Jeux de la Francophonie, the gold medal at the 1995 Summer Universiade, the bronze medal at the 1996 European Indoor Championships and the silver medal at the 1997 Summer Universiade. He participated at the 1992 World Junior Championships, the 1994 European Championships, the 1995 World Indoor Championships, the 1995 World Championships, the 1996 Olympic Games and the 1997 World Championships without reaching the final. In 1997 he received a three-month doping ban for ephedrine use.

After the doping ban he finished fourth at the 1998 European Indoor Championships, eighth at the 1998 European Championships, eighth at the 1999 World Championships and second at the 1999 Summer Universiade and seventh at the 2000 European Indoor Championships. He also competed at the 2000 Olympic Games, the 2001 World Championships, the 2002 European Championships, the 2003 World Indoor Championships, the 2003 World Championships (did not finish), the 2005 World Championships and the 2006 European Championships (did not finish) without reaching the final.

He became Belgian champion in 1994, 1997, 1999, 2001, 2002, 2005 and 2006. His personal best time was 13.25 seconds in the 110 metres hurdles, achieved in the semifinal of the 1998 European Championships in Budapest. This is the Belgian national record as of 2007. In the 60 metres hurdles he had 7.55 seconds, also achieved in 1998. He was given the Golden Spike award in the same year.

He is now a coach. Among his athletes are Adrien Deghelt.
