= 1992 European Athletics Indoor Championships – Men's 60 metres hurdles =

European Athletics

The men's 60 metres hurdles event at the 1992 European Athletics Indoor Championships was held in Palasport di Genova on 1 March.

== Medalists ==
Gold	Silver	Bronze
Igors Kazanovs; Latvia	Tomasz Nagórka; Poland	Jiří Hudec; Czechoslovakia

== Results ==
=== Heats ===
First 3 from each heat (Q) and the next 4 fastest (q) qualified for the semifinals.

Rank	Heat	Name	Nationality	Time	Notes
1	3	Tomasz Nagórka	Poland	7.70	Q
2	2	Igor Kováč	Czechoslovakia	7.72	Q
3	2	Nigel Walker	Great Britain	7.74	Q
4	1	Igors Kazanovs	Latvia	7.75	Q
5	2	Antti Haapakoski	Finland	7.76	Q
5	3	Jiří Hudec	Czechoslovakia	7.76	Q
7	1	Sébastien Thibault	France	7.78	Q
8	1	Laurent Ottoz	Italy	7.79	Q
9	2	Carlos Sala	Spain	7.80	q
9	4	Hugh Teape	Great Britain	7.80	Q
11	3	Jon Ridgeon	Great Britain	7.81	Q
11	4	Rafał Cieśla	Poland	7.81	Q
13	4	Marco Todeschini	Italy	7.84	Q
14	4	Aleksandr Markin	Unified Team	7.84	q
15	4	Dietmar Koszewski	Germany	7.89	q
16	3	Thomas J. Kearns	Ireland	7.90	q
17	4	Dan Philibert	France	7.91	
18	1	Claes Albihn	Sweden	7.92	
19	1	Mike Fenner	Germany	7.93	
20	1	Stelios Bisbas	Greece	7.93	
21	4	Robert Změlík	Czechoslovakia	7.95	
22	3	Niklas Eriksson	Sweden	7.96	
23	3	Gheorghe Boroi	Romania	8.01	
24	2	Paweł Grzegorzewski	Poland	8.03	
25	2	Ruhan Işım	Turkey	8.13	
26	2	Vincent Clarico	France	8.16	
27	1	Erik Ulvness	Norway	8.18	
	3	Sven Göhler	Germany	DNF	

=== Semifinals ===
First 4 from each semifinal qualified directly (Q) for the final.

Rank	Heat	Name	Nationality	Time	Notes
1	1	Igors Kazanovs	Latvia	7.61	Q
2	2	Tomasz Nagórka	Poland	7.67	Q
3	2	Jiří Hudec	Czechoslovakia	7.72	Q
4	2	Antti Haapakoski	Finland	7.73	Q
5	2	Laurent Ottoz	Italy	7.74	Q
6	2	Hugh Teape	Great Britain	7.75	
7	1	Rafał Cieśla	Poland	7.76	Q
7	2	Aleksandr Markin	Unified Team	7.76	
9	1	Jon Ridgeon	Great Britain	7.78	Q
10	1	Marco Todeschini	Italy	7.80	Q
11	1	Nigel Walker	Great Britain	7.81	
12	2	Carlos Sala	Spain	7.95	
13	2	Dietmar Koszewski	Germany	7.98	
14	1	Thomas J. Kearns	Ireland	7.99	
15	1	Sébastien Thibault	France	8.53	
16	1	Igor Kováč	Czechoslovakia	9.14	

=== Final ===
Rank	Lane	Name	Nationality	Time	Notes
1st place, gold medalist(s)	6	Igors Kazanovs	Latvia	7.55	
2nd place, silver medalist(s)	3	Tomasz Nagórka	Poland	7.69	
3rd place, bronze medalist(s)	4	Jiří Hudec	Czechoslovakia	7.72	
4	8	Jon Ridgeon	Great Britain	7.78	
5	5	Antti Haapakoski	Finland	7.79	
6	1	Laurent Ottoz	Italy	7.80	
7	7	Rafał Cieśla	Poland	7.83	
8	2	Marco Todeschini	Italy	7.83	
