= Athletics at the 1992 Summer Olympics – Men's 110 metres hurdles =

Men's 110 metres hurdles at the Games of the XXV Olympiad
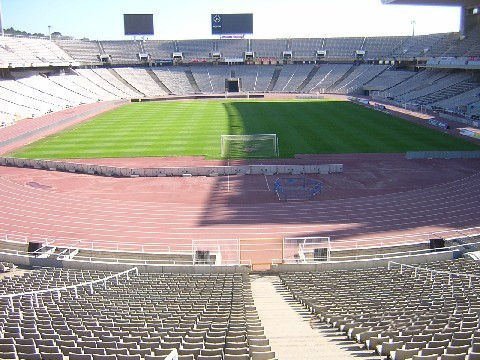
- Estadio Olimpico de Montjuic (2007)
- Venue: Estadi Olímpic Lluís Companys
- Date: 2 and 3 August
- Competitors: 39 from 27 nations
- Winning time: 13.12

Medalists
| 1st place, gold medalist(s) | | Mark McKoy; Canada |
| 2nd place, silver medalist(s) | | Tony Dees; United States |
| 3rd place, bronze medalist(s) | | Jack Pierce; United States |

Official Video Highlights @ 8:40

The men's 110 metres hurdles at the 1992 Summer Olympics in Barcelona, Spain took place on 2 and 3 August 1992. Thirty-nine athletes from 27 nations competed. The maximum number of athletes per nation had been set at 3 since the 1930 Olympic Congress. The event was won by Mark McKoy of Canada, the nation's second title in the event and first since 1920. It broke a two-Games streak of American victories.

== Background ==
This was the 22nd appearance of the event, which is one of 12 athletics events to have been held at every Summer Olympics. Five finalists from 1988 returned: silver medalist Colin Jackson of Great Britain, fourth-place finisher Vladimir Shishkin of the Soviet Union, sixth-place finisher Tony Jarrett of Great Britain, seventh-place finisher Mark McKoy of Canada, and eighth-place finisher Arthur Blake of the United States. For the third straight Games, Greg Foster of the United States was the reigning world champion; for the second straight Games, he did not make the American Olympic team. Jackson (the 1990 European and Commonwealth champion) and McKoy (the 1982 and 1986 Commonwealth champion) were the favorites though both the United States and Great Britain teams were strong and deep.

Bahrain, Latvia, the Netherlands Antilles, and Sierra Leone each made their first appearance in the event; some former Soviet republics appeared for the only time as the Unified Team. The United States made its 21st appearance, most of any nation (having missed only the boycotted 1980 Games).

== Competition format ==
The competition used the four-round format previously used in 1960 and 1988, still using the eight-man semifinals and finals used since 1964. The "fastest loser" system, also introduced in 1964, was used in the first two rounds.

The first round consisted of five heats, with 7 or 8 hurdlers each. The top four hurdlers in each heat, along with the four next fastest overall, advanced to the quarterfinals. Because of a tie, there were actually five "fastest losers" advanced. The 25 quarterfinalists were divided into three heats of 8 hurdlers each (with one having an extra), with the top four in each heat as well as the next four overall advancing. The 16 semifinalists were divided into two semifinals of 8 hurdlers each; again, the top four hurdlers in each advanced to the 8-man final.

== Records ==
These were the standing world and Olympic records (in seconds) prior to the 1992 Summer Olympics.

| World record | Roger Kingdom (USA) | 12.92 | Zürich, Switzerland | 16 August 1989 |
| Olympic record | Roger Kingdom (USA) | 12.98 | Seoul, South Korea | 28 September 1988 |

No new world or Olympic records were set during the competition.

== Schedule ==
All times are Central European Summer Time (UTC+2)

| Date | Time | Round |
|---|---|---|
| Sunday, 2 August 1992 | 10:00; 18:30 | Round 1 Quarterfinals |
| Monday, 3 August 1992 | 18:00; 20:15 | Semifinals; Final |

== Results ==
=== Round 1 ===
==== Heat 1 ====
| Rank | Lane | Athlete | Nation | Time | Notes |
|---|---|---|---|---|---|
| 1 | 3 | Colin Jackson | Great Britain | 13.10 | Q |
| 2 | 5 | Emilio Valle | Cuba | 13.47 | Q |
| 3 | 1 | Vladimir Shishkin | Unified Team | 13.58 | Q |
| 4 | 8 | Laurent Ottoz | Italy | 13.71 | Q |
| 5 | 7 | Dan Philibert | France | 13.72 | q |
| 6 | 2 | Richard Bucknor | Jamaica | 13.91 | q |
| 7 | 4 | Nurherman Majid | Malaysia | 14.34 | |
| 8 | 6 | Albert Miller | Fiji | 14.88 | |
| | | | | Wind: +0.9 m/s | |

==== Heat 2 ====
| Rank | Lane | Athlete | Nation | Time | Notes |
|---|---|---|---|---|---|
| 1 | 5 | Tony Dees | United States | 13.38 | Q |
| 2 | 6 | Sergey Usov | Unified Team | 13.71 | Q |
| 3 | 4 | Gheorghe Boroi | Romania | 13.82 | Q |
| 4 | 1 | Antti Haapakoski | Finland | 13.84 | Q |
| 5 | 2 | Philippe Tourret | France | 13.91 | q |
| 6 | 3 | Anthony Knight | Jamaica | 14.12 | |
| 7 | 7 | Judex Lefou | Mauritius | 14.45 | |
| | | | | Wind: +0.9 m/s | |

==== Heat 3 ====
| Rank | Lane | Athlete | Nation | Time | Notes |
|---|---|---|---|---|---|
| 1 | 6 | Jack Pierce | United States | 13.47 | Q |
| 2 | 7 | Hugh Teape | Great Britain | 13.68 | Q |
| 3 | 5 | Li Tong | China | 13.69 | Q |
| 4 | 4 | Igors Kazanovs | Latvia | 13.88 | Q |
| 5 | 3 | Arto Bryggare | Finland | 13.92 | |
| 6 | 1 | Mircea Oaidă | Romania | 14.04 | |
| 7 | 2 | Joilto Santos Bonfim | Brazil | 14.06 | |
| 8 | 8 | Khaled Abdullah Hassan | Bahrain | 15.41 | |
| | | | | Wind: -0.2 m/s | |

==== Heat 4 ====
| Rank | Lane | Athlete | Nation | Time | Notes |
|---|---|---|---|---|---|
| 1 | 5 | Mark McKoy | Canada | 13.26 | Q |
| 2 | 7 | Herwig Röttl | Austria | 13.41 | Q |
| 3 | 6 | Arthur Blake | United States | 13.34 | Q |
| 4 | 1 | Thomas Kearns | Ireland | 13.63 | Q |
| 5 | 2 | Dietmar Koszewski | Germany | 13.64 | q |
| 6 | 4 | Toshihiko Iwasaki | Japan | 13.78 | q |
| 7 | 3 | Kheir El-Din Obeid | Syria | 14.23 | |
| 8 | 8 | James Sharpe | Netherlands Antilles | 14.49 | |
| | | | | Wind: +1.8 m/s | |

==== Heat 5 ====
| Rank | Lane | Athlete | Nation | Time | Notes |
|---|---|---|---|---|---|
| 1 | 4 | Tony Jarrett | Great Britain | 13.31 | Q |
| 2 | 7 | Florian Schwarthoff | Germany | 13.61 | Q |
| 3 | 5 | Carlos Sala | Spain | 13.62 | Q |
| 4 | 6 | Vadim Kurach | Unified Team | 13.86 | Q |
| 5 | 1 | Sébastien Thibault | France | 13.94 | |
| 6 | 2 | Igor Kováč | Czechoslovakia | 14.12 | |
| 7 | 8 | Benjamin Grant | Sierra Leone | 14.27 | |
| 9 | 3 | Zeiad Al-Kheder | Kuwait | 14.51 | |
| | | | | Wind: +1.2 m/s | |

==== Overall results for round 1 ====
| Rank | Heat | Athlete | Nation | Time | Notes |
|---|---|---|---|---|---|
| 1 | 1 | Colin Jackson | Great Britain | 13.10 | Q |
| 2 | 4 | Mark McKoy | Canada | 13.26 | Q |
| 3 | 5 | Tony Jarrett | Great Britain | 13.31 | Q |
| 4 | 2 | Tony Dees | United States | 13.38 | Q |
| 5 | 4 | Herwig Röttl | Austria | 13.41 | Q |
| 7 | 4 | Arthur Blake | United States | 13.45 | Q |
| 7 | 3 | Jack Pierce | United States | 13.47 | Q |
| 7 | 1 | Emilio Valle | Cuba | 13.47 | Q |
| 9 | 1 | Vladimir Shishkin | Unified Team | 13.58 | Q |
| 10 | 5 | Florian Schwarthoff | Germany | 13.61 | Q |
| 11 | 5 | Carlos Sala | Spain | 13.62 | Q |
| 12 | 4 | Thomas Kearns | Ireland | 13.63 | Q |
| 13 | 4 | Dietmar Koszewski | Germany | 13.64 | q |
| 14 | 3 | Hugh Teape | Great Britain | 13.68 | Q |
| 15 | 3 | Li Tong | China | 13.69 | Q |
| 16 | 1 | Laurent Ottoz | Italy | 13.71 | Q |
| 16 | 2 | Sergey Usov | Unified Team | 13.71 | Q |
| 18 | 1 | Dan Philibert | France | 13.72 | q |
| 19 | 4 | Toshihiko Iwasaki | Japan | 13.78 | q |
| 20 | 2 | Gheorghe Boroi | Romania | 13.82 | Q |
| 21 | 2 | Antti Haapakoski | Finland | 13.84 | Q |
| 22 | 5 | Vadim Kurach | Unified Team | 13.86 | Q |
| 23 | 3 | Igors Kazanovs | Latvia | 13.88 | Q |
| 24 | 1 | Richard Bucknor | Jamaica | 13.91 | q |
| 24 | 2 | Philippe Tourret | France | 13.91 | q |
| 26 | 3 | Arto Bryggare | Finland | 13.92 | |
| 27 | 5 | Sébastien Thibault | France | 13.94 | |
| 28 | 3 | Mircea Oaidă | Romania | 14.04 | |
| 29 | 3 | Joilto Santos Bonfim | Brazil | 14.06 | |
| 30 | 2 | Anthony Knight | Jamaica | 14.12 | |
| 30 | 5 | Igor Kováč | Czechoslovakia | 14.12 | |
| 32 | 4 | Kheir El-Din Obeid | Syria | 14.23 | |
| 33 | 5 | Benjamin Grant | Sierra Leone | 14.27 | |
| 34 | 1 | Nurherman Majid | Malaysia | 14.34 | |
| 35 | 2 | Judex Lefou | Mauritius | 14.45 | |
| 36 | 4 | James Sharpe | Netherlands Antilles | 14.49 | |
| 37 | 5 | Zeiad Al-Kheder | Kuwait | 14.51 | |
| 38 | 1 | Albert Miller | Fiji | 14.88 | |
| 39 | 3 | Khaled Abdullah Hassan | Bahrain | 15.41 | |

=== Quarterfinals ===
==== Quarterfinal 1 ====
| Rank | Lane | Athlete | Nation | Time | Notes |
|---|---|---|---|---|---|
| 1 | 3 | Mark McKoy | Canada | 13.27 | Q |
| 2 | 5 | Florian Schwarthoff | Germany | 13.31 | Q |
| 3 | 4 | Emilio Valle | Cuba | 13.42 | Q |
| 4 | 6 | Arthur Blake | United States | 13.50 | Q |
| 5 | 8 | Hugh Teape | Great Britain | 13.50 | q |
| 6 | 1 | Laurent Ottoz | Italy | 13.76 | q |
| 7 | 7 | Toshihiko Iwasaki | Japan | 13.88 | |
| 8 | 2 | Vadim Kurach | Unified Team | 14.23 | |
| | | | | Wind: -1.1 m/s | |

==== Quarterfinal 2 ====
| Rank | Lane | Athlete | Nation | Time | Notes |
|---|---|---|---|---|---|
| 1 | 5 | Jack Pierce | United States | 13.17 | Q |
| 2 | 6 | Colin Jackson | Great Britain | 13.57 | Q |
| 3 | 4 | Herwig Röttl | Austria | 13.68 | Q |
| 4 | 2 | Igors Kazanovs | Latvia | 13.76 | Q |
| 5 | 8 | Carlos Sala | Spain | 13.80 | |
| 6 | 3 | Vladimir Shishkin | Unified Team | 13.81 | |
| 7 | 7 | Antti Haapakoski | Finland | 14.00 | |
| 8 | 1 | Philippe Tourret | France | 14.09 | |
| 9 | 9 | Richard Bucknor | Jamaica | 14.22 | |
| | | | | Wind: -0.6 m/s | |

==== Quarterfinal 3 ====
| Rank | Lane | Athlete | Nation | Time | Notes |
|---|---|---|---|---|---|
| 1 | 3 | Tony Dees | United States | 13.31 | Q |
| 2 | 4 | Tony Jarrett | Great Britain | 13.43 | Q |
| 3 | 1 | Sergey Usov | Unified Team | 13.61 | Q |
| 4 | 2 | Li Tong | China | 13.74 | Q |
| 5 | 7 | Dan Philibert | France | 13.74 | q |
| 6 | 5 | Dietmar Koszewski | Germany | 13.78 | q |
| 7 | 6 | Thomas Kearns | Ireland | 13.87 | |
| 8 | 8 | Gheorghe Boroi | Romania | 14.07 | |
| | | | | Wind: -0.3 m/s | |

=== Semifinals ===
==== Semifinal 1 ====
| Rank | Lane | Athlete | Nation | Time | Notes |
|---|---|---|---|---|---|
| 1 | 4 | Jack Pierce | United States | 13.21 | Q |
| 2 | 3 | Florian Schwarthoff | Germany | 13.23 | Q |
| 3 | 6 | Tony Jarrett | Great Britain | 13.29 | Q |
| 4 | 5 | Hugh Teape | Great Britain | 13.60 | Q |
| 5 | 2 | Sergey Usov | Unified Team | 13.67 | |
| 6 | 7 | Igors Kazanovs | Latvia | 13.77 | |
| 7 | 8 | Dietmar Koszewski | Germany | 14.06 | |
| — | 1 | Herwig Röttl | Austria | DNS | |
| | | | | Wind: -0.4 m/s | |

==== Semifinal 2 ====
| Rank | Lane | Athlete | Nation | Time | Notes |
|---|---|---|---|---|---|
| 1 | 4 | Mark McKoy | Canada | 13.12 | Q |
| 2 | 7 | Colin Jackson | Great Britain | 13.19 | Q |
| 3 | 3 | Tony Dees | United States | 13.31 | Q |
| 4 | 6 | Emilio Valle | Cuba | 13.45 | Q |
| 5 | 8 | Li Tong | China | 13.62 | |
| 6 | 1 | Dan Philibert | France | 13.77 | |
| 7 | 2 | Laurent Ottoz | Italy | 13.77 | |
| — | 5 | Arthur Blake | United States | DSQ | |
| | | | | Wind: -0.8 m/s | |

=== Final ===
The final was held on August 3, 1992.

| Rank | Lane | Athlete | Nation | Time |
|---|---|---|---|---|
| 1st place, gold medalist(s) | 4 | Mark McKoy | Canada | 13.12 |
| 2nd place, silver medalist(s) | 7 | Tony Dees | United States | 13.24 |
| 3rd place, bronze medalist(s) | 6 | Jack Pierce | United States | 13.26 |
| 4 | 8 | Tony Jarrett | Great Britain | 13.26 |
| 5 | 5 | Florian Schwarthoff | Germany | 13.29 |
| 6 | 2 | Emilio Valle | Cuba | 13.41 |
| 7 | 3 | Colin Jackson | Great Britain | 13.46 |
| 8 | 1 | Hugh Teape | Great Britain | 14.00 |
| | | | | Wind: +0.8 m/s |

== See also ==
- 1988 Men's Olympic 110m Hurdles (Seoul)
- 1990 Men's European Championships 110m Hurdles (Split)
- 1991 Men's World Championships 110m Hurdles (Tokyo)
- 1993 Men's World Championships 110m Hurdles (Stuttgart)
- 1994 Men's European Championships 110m Hurdles (Helsinki)
