= 1989 European Athletics Indoor Championships – Men's 60 metres hurdles =

Athletic event at the 1989 European Athletic Indoor Championships

The men's 60 metres hurdles event at the 1989 European Athletics Indoor Championships was held on 19 February.

== Medalists ==
Gold	Silver	Bronze
Colin Jackson; Great Britain	Holger Pohland; East Germany	Philippe Tourret; France

== Results ==
=== Heats ===
First 2 from each heat (Q) and the next 6 fastest (q) qualified for the semifinals.

Rank	Heat	Name	Nationality	Time	Notes
1	1	Colin Jackson	Great Britain	7.66	Q
2	2	Aleš Höffer	Czechoslovakia	7.73	Q
3	4	Holger Pohland	East Germany	7.74	Q
4	5	Tomasz Nagórka	Poland	7.76	Q
5	1	Javier Moracho	Spain	7.77	Q
5	2	Carlos Sala	Spain	7.77	Q
5	5	Philippe Tourret	France	7.77	Q
8	1	Paweł Grzegorzewski	Poland	7.80	q
8	4	Nigel Walker	Great Britain	7.80	Q
10	2	Rafał Cieśla	Poland	7.81	q
11	1	Vladimir Shishkin	Soviet Union	7.82	q
12	3	Jiří Hudec	Czechoslovakia	7.83	Q
13	3	Steve Buckeridge	Great Britain	7.83	Q
14	3	Florian Schwarthoff	West Germany	7.84	q
14	5	Dietmar Koszewski	West Germany	7.84	q
16	2	Stefan Mattern	West Germany	7.86	q
17	5	Ulf Söderman	Sweden	7.90	
18	5	Pavel Šáda	Czechoslovakia	7.91	
19	3	György Bakos	Hungary	7.92	
19	4	Philippe Aubert	France	7.92	
21	4	Alain Cuypers	Belgium	7.93	
22	3	Herwig Röttl	Austria	7.94	
23	4	Lajos Sárközi	Hungary	7.97	
24	1	Gianni Tozzi	Italy	7.99	
25	4	Kai Kyllönen	Finland	8.01	
26	5	Harri Rouhiainen	Finland	8.03	
27	1	Thomas J. Kearns	Ireland	8.08	
28	2	Igor Kazanov	Soviet Union	8.19	
28	3	João Lima	Portugal	8.19	
30	2	Antonios Kezos	Cyprus	8.40	

=== Semifinals ===
First 3 from each semifinal (Q) and the nest 2 fastest (q) qualified for the final.

Rank	Heat	Name	Nationality	Time	Notes
1	1	Colin Jackson	Great Britain	7.53	Q
2	2	Holger Pohland	East Germany	7.65	Q
3	2	Philippe Tourret	France	7.65	Q
4	2	Florian Schwarthoff	West Germany	7.70	Q
5	1	Jiří Hudec	Czechoslovakia	7.71	Q
6	1	Carlos Sala	Spain	7.72	Q
7	2	Aleš Höffer	Czechoslovakia	7.74	q
8	1	Tomasz Nagórka	Poland	7.76	q
9	1	Vladimir Shishkin	Soviet Union	7.78	
10	1	Rafał Cieśla	Poland	7.79	
10	2	Stefan Mattern	West Germany	7.79	
12	1	Steve Buckeridge	Great Britain	7.80	
12	2	Nigel Walker	Great Britain	7.80	
14	1	Dietmar Koszewski	West Germany	7.81	
15	2	Paweł Grzegorzewski	Poland	7.82	
16	2	Javier Moracho	Spain	7.92	

=== Final ===
Rank	Lane	Name	Nationality	Time	Notes
1st place, gold medalist(s)	5	Colin Jackson	Great Britain	7.59	
2nd place, silver medalist(s)	4	Holger Pohland	East Germany	7.65	
3rd place, bronze medalist(s)	3	Philippe Tourret	France	7.67	
4	2	Jiří Hudec	Czechoslovakia	7.69	
5	1	Carlos Sala	Spain	7.72	
6	6	Florian Schwarthoff	West Germany	7.72	
7	7	Tomasz Nagórka	Poland	7.81	
8	8	Aleš Höffer	Czechoslovakia	7.84	
