= 1991 IAAF World Indoor Championships – Men's 60 metres hurdles =

The men's 60 metres hurdles event at the 1991 IAAF World Indoor Championships was held on 9 March.

== Medalists ==
Gold	Silver	Bronze
Greg Foster; United States	Igor Kazanov; Soviet Union	Mark McKoy; Canada

== Results ==
=== Heats ===
First 3 of each heat (Q) and next 4 fastest (q) qualified for the semifinals.

Rank	Heat	Name	Nationality	Time	Notes
1	3	Greg Foster	United States	7.52	Q
2	1	Mark McKoy	Canada	7.58	Q
2	3	Emilio Valle	Cuba	7.58	Q, NR
4	4	Jack Pierce	United States	7.62	Q
5	4	Philippe Tourret	France	7.66	Q
6	2	George Boroi	Romania	7.68	Q
7	3	Piotr Wójcik	Poland	7.70	Q, PB
8	3	Jiří Hudec	Czechoslovakia	7.71	q
9	2	Igor Kazanov	Soviet Union	7.72	Q
9	4	Nigel Walker	Great Britain	7.72	Q
11	2	Holger Pohland	Germany	7.73	Q
12	1	Sergey Usov	Soviet Union	7.75	Q
12	3	Dan Philibert	France	7.75	q
14	4	Herwig Röttl	Austria	7.77	q, =NR
14	1	Andrew Parker	Jamaica	7.77	Q
16	1	Thomas J. Kearns	Ireland	7.78	q, NR
17	1	Carlos Sala	Spain	7.78	
18	2	Laurent Ottoz	Italy	7.81	
19	2	Rafał Cieśla	Poland	7.84	
20	4	Stefan Mattern	Germany	7.85	
21	2	Kimihiro Kaneko	Japan	7.89	
22	4	Tim Kroeker	Canada	7.93	
23	3	Toshihiko Iwasaki	Japan	7.94	
24	2	Nur Herman Majid	Malaysia	8.33	NR
	1	Robert Změlík	Czechoslovakia	DNF	

=== Semifinals ===
First 4 of each semifinal (Q) qualified directly for the final.

Rank	Heat	Name	Nationality	Time	Notes
1	1	Greg Foster	United States	7.44	Q
2	2	Mark McKoy	Canada	7.49	Q
3	2	Igor Kazanov	Soviet Union	7.56	Q
4	2	Philippe Tourret	France	7.59	Q
5	1	Emilio Valle	Cuba	7.60	Q
6	1	George Boroi	Romania	7.60	Q
7	2	Jack Pierce	United States	7.61	Q
8	2	Nigel Walker	Great Britain	7.65	
9	1	Sergey Usov	Soviet Union	7.66	Q
10	2	Jiří Hudec	Czechoslovakia	7.67	
11	1	Thomas J. Kearns	Ireland	7.69	NR
12	1	Piotr Wójcik	Poland	7.73	
12	2	Holger Pohland	Germany	7.73	
14	2	Herwig Röttl	Austria	7.76	NR
15	1	Dan Philibert	France	7.77	
16	1	Andrew Parker	Jamaica	7.84	

=== Final ===
Rank	Lane	Name	Nationality	Time	Notes
1st place, gold medalist(s)	4	Greg Foster	United States	7.45	F1
2nd place, silver medalist(s)	6	Igor Kazanov	Soviet Union	7.47	
3rd place, bronze medalist(s)	5	Mark McKoy	Canada	7.49	
4	3	Emilio Valle	Cuba	7.60	
5	1	Sergey Usov	Soviet Union	7.66	
6	7	Philippe Tourret	France	7.66	F1
7	2	George Boroi	Romania	7.67	
8	8	Jack Pierce	United States	7.68	
