= 1991 World Championships in Athletics – Men's 110 metres hurdles =

Video on YouTube Official Video

These are the official results of the Men's 110 metres Hurdles event at the 1991 IAAF World Championships in Tokyo, Japan. There were a total number of 38 participating athletes, with two semi-finals and five qualifying heats and the final held on Thursday August 29, 1991.

== Summary ==
All the eyes were on 33 year old Greg Foster, who was, as yet, undefeated in World Championship finals. Foster had lane 4 in the center of the track. Missing was the reigning double Olympic Champion and world record holder Roger Kingdom out with an ACL surgery. Next to Foster in lane 5 was the leading qualifier from the semis was Tony Jarrett, who had just edged Foster in that semi. The other semi was significantly slower, won by Jack Pierce.

Before the gun went off, Foster was already running—a false start, common and legal in this era. When the starter raised the gun again, Foster had a strike against him, meaning he could be disqualified for a second offense. Ostensibly that should make Foster more cautious. The next start was legal, Mark McKoy got a good start and had a clear lead over the first hurdle, with Foster just inches ahead of the wall of competitors almost a full stride behind. Over the next two hurdles, Foster made up most of the gap. Challenged to his right, McKoy began to struggle, Foster taking a clear lead. Behind them, Pierce was separating from the group in third place. By the sixth hurdle, Pierce caught McKoy and had the momentum chasing Foster. The next chaser was Jarrett, who caught McKoy over the eighth hurdle. Pierce was gaining on Foster but was still half a metre behind over the last hurdle. In the run in to the finish line, that half metre disappeared, the two hit the finish line together with Pierce clearly ahead just inches past the finish line. Jarrett continued on to take bronze almost .2 of a second behind the leaders.

With new technology, Japanese officials were able to display the finish picture quickly after the race, still looking like a tie. Three minutes later, Foster was announced as the winner, now for the third time in a row.

== Medalists ==
Gold	Greg Foster; United States (USA)
Silver	Jack Pierce; United States (USA)
Bronze	(United Kingdom) Tony Jarrett; Great Britain (GBR)

== Schedule ==
- All times are Japan Standard Time (UTC+9)

Heats
27.08.1991 – 10:00h
Semi-Finals
27.08.1991 – 17:00h
Final
29.08.1991 – 18:30h

== Final ==
RANK	FINAL	TIME
	Greg Foster (USA)	13.06
	Jack Pierce (USA)	13.06
	Tony Jarrett (GBR)	13.25
4.	Mark McKoy (CAN)	13.30
5.	Dan Philibert (FRA)	13.33
6.	Vladimir Shishkin (URS)	13.39
7.	Florian Schwarthoff (GER)	13.41
8.	Li Tong (CHN)	13.46

== Semi-finals ==
- Held on Tuesday 1991-08-27

RANK	HEAT 1	TIME
1.	Jack Pierce (USA)	13.36
2.	Florian Schwarthoff (GER)	13.41
3.	Li Tong (CHN)	13.50
4.	Vladimir Shishkin (URS)	13.52
5.	Alexis Sánchez (CUB)	13.81
6.	Igor Kovac (TCH)	13.89
7.	Thomas Kearns (IRL)	14.02
—	Colin Jackson (GBR)	DNS

RANK	HEAT 2	TIME
1.	Tony Jarrett (GBR)	13.23
2.	Greg Foster (USA)	13.23
3.	Mark McKoy (CAN)	13.28
4.	Dan Philibert (FRA)	13.38
5.	Igors Kazanovs (URS)	13.65
6.	David Nelson (GBR)	13.67
7.	Liviu Giurgian (ROM)	13.82
8.	Jiří Hudec (TCH)	13.95

== Qualifying heats ==
- Held on Tuesday 1991-08-27

RANK	HEAT 1	TIME
1.	Thomas Kearns (IRL)	13.71
2.	Jiří Hudec (TCH)	13.72
3.	Liviu Giurgian (ROM)	13.84
4.	Sebastien Thibault (FRA)	13.92
5.	Loi Nguyen Van (VIE)	14.74
—	Ruhan Isim (TUR)	DNF
—	Tomasz Nagórka (POL)	DNF
—	Renaldo Nehemiah (USA)	DNS

RANK	HEAT 2	TIME
1.	Greg Foster (USA)	13.32
2.	Dan Philibert (FRA)	13.34
3.	Igors Kazanovs (URS)	13.70
3.	Igor Kovac (TCH)	13.70
5.	Joilto Bonfim (BRA)	13.72
6.	Mike Fenner (GER)	13.78
7.	Antti Haapakoski (FIN)	13.88

RANK	HEAT 3	TIME
1.	Li Tong (CHN)	13.34
2.	Tony Jarrett (GBR)	13.40
3.	Alexis Sánchez (CUB)	13.58
4.	Dietmar Koszewski (GER)	13.67
5.	Mircea Oaida (ROM)	13.68
6.	Gennadiy Dakshevich (URS)	13.69
7.	Georgi Georgiev (BUL)	14.19
8.	Judex Lefou (MRI)	14.26

RANK	HEAT 4	TIME
1.	Jack Pierce (USA)	13.23
2.	Mark McKoy (CAN)	13.39
3.	David Nelson (GBR)	13.42
4.	Piotr Wójcik (POL)	13.47
5.	Herwig Röttl (AUT)	13.66
6.	John Caliguri (AUS)	13.77
7.	Zeiad Al-Kheder (KUW)	14.48
—	Rashid Al-Abdulla (QAT)	DNF

RANK	HEAT 5	TIME
1.	Colin Jackson (GBR)	13.25
2.	Florian Schwarthoff (GER)	13.39
3.	Vladimir Shishkin (URS)	13.51
4.	Toshihiko Iwasaki (JPN)	13.58
5.	Kai Kyllonen (FIN)	13.60
6.	Carlos Sala (ESP)	13.73
7.	Elvis Cedeño (VEN)	13.85

== See also ==
- 1987 Men's World Championships 110m Hurdles (Rome)
- 1988 Men's Olympic 110m Hurdles (Seoul)
- 1990 Men's European Championships 110m Hurdles (Split)
- 1992 Men's Olympic 110m Hurdles (Barcelona)
- 1993 Men's World Championships 110m Hurdles (Stuttgart)
