= 1993 World Championships in Athletics – Men's 110 metres hurdles =

These are the official results of the Men's 110 metres Hurdles event at the 1993 IAAF World Championships in Stuttgart, Germany. There were a total of 47 participating athletes, with three semi-finals and six qualifying heats and the final held on Friday August 20, 1993. The gold medal was won by Colin Jackson of Great Britain with a world record time of 12.91 seconds.

== Medalists ==
Gold	(United Kingdom) Colin Jackson; Great Britain (GBR)
Silver	(United Kingdom) Tony Jarrett; Great Britain (GBR)
Bronze	Jack Pierce; United States (USA)

== Final ==
RANK	FINAL	TIME
	Colin Jackson (GBR)	12.91 WR
	Tony Jarrett (GBR)	13.00
	Jack Pierce (USA)	13.06
4.	Emilio Valle (CUB)	13.20
5.	Florian Schwarthoff (GER)	13.27
6.	Igors Kazanovs (LAT)	13.38
7.	Dietmar Koszewski (GER)	13.60
8.	Tony Dees (USA)	14.13

== Semi-finals ==
- Held on Thursday 1993-08-19

RANK	HEAT 1	TIME
1.	Colin Jackson (GBR)	13.13
2.	Igors Kazanovs (LAT)	13.26
3.	Florian Schwarthoff (GER)	13.31
4.	Mark Crear (USA)	13.38
5.	Dan Philibert (FRA)	13.42
6.	Piotr Wójcik (POL)	13.67
7.	Sean Cahill (IRL)	13.84
8.	Vladimir Belokon (UKR)	14.01

RANK	HEAT 2	TIME
1.	Jack Pierce (USA)	13.11
2.	Dietmar Koszewski (GER)	13.48
3.	Gheorghe Boroi (ROM)	13.54
4.	Li Tong (CHN)	13.59
5.	Thomas Kearns (IRL)	13.68
6.	Andrew Tulloch (GBR)	13.79
7.	Antti Haapakoski (FIN)	13.88
8.	Igor Kováč (SVK)	14.02

RANK	HEAT 3	TIME
1.	Tony Jarrett (GBR)	13.14
2.	Tony Dees (USA)	13.19
3.	Emilio Valle (CUB)	13.19
4.	Kyle Vander-Kuyp (AUS)	13.48
5.	Hubert Grossard (BEL)	13.61
6.	Eric Kaiser (GER)	13.64
7.	Tim Kroeker (CAN)	13.74
8.	Kai Kyllonen (FIN)	13.96

== Qualifying heats ==
- Held on Thursday 1993-08-19

RANK	HEAT 1	TIME
1.	Colin Jackson (GBR)	13.23
2.	Dietmar Koszewski (GER)	13.52
3.	Piotr Wójcik (POL)	13.72
4.	Hubert Grossard (BEL)	13.79
5.	Fausto Frigerio (ITA)	13.97
6.	Pedro Chiamulera (BRA)	14.11
7.	Mustapha Sdad (MAR)	14.38

RANK	HEAT 2	TIME
1.	Jack Pierce (USA)	13.53
2.	Dan Philibert (FRA)	13.53
3.	Eric Kaiser (GER)	13.54
4.	Sean Cahill (IRL)	13.70
5.	Yevgeniy Pechonkin (RUS)	13.85
6.	Pekka Vesterinen (FIN)	13.89
7.	Wagner Marseille (HAI)	14.03
—	Alex Foster (CRC)	DNS

RANK	HEAT 3	TIME
1.	Tony Jarrett (GBR)	13.32
2.	Kyle Vander-Kuyp (AUS)	13.57
3.	Igors Kazanovs (LAT)	13.61
4.	Vincent Clarico (FRA)	13.91
5.	Joilto Bonfim (BRA)	14.00
6.	Henry Andrade (CPV)	14.64
7.	Robert Kosev (MKD)	14.78
8.	Robin Korving (NED)	14.88

RANK	HEAT 4	TIME
1.	Emilio Valle (CUB)	13.32
2.	Mark Crear (USA)	13.47
3.	Andrew Tulloch (GBR)	13.59
4.	Kai Kyllonen (FIN)	13.76
5.	Vladimir Shishkin (RUS)	13.89
6.	Miguel Soto (PUR)	13.92
7.	Yusuke Tsuge (JPN)	14.11
—	Laurent Ottoz (ITA)	DNS

RANK	HEAT 5	TIME
1.	Tony Dees (USA)	13.53
2.	Florian Schwarthoff (GER)	13.60
3.	Thomas Kearns (IRL)	13.77
4.	Vladimir Belokon (UKR)	13.83
5.	Kobus Schoeman (RSA)	13.83
6.	Mathieu Jouys (FRA)	13.93
7.	Jiří Hudec (CZE)	14.18
8.	Avele Tanielu (SAM)	19.31

RANK	HEAT 6	TIME
1.	Gheorghe Boroi (ROM)	13.61
2.	Li Tong (CHN)	13.64
3.	Tim Kroeker (CAN)	13.71
4.	Igor Kováč (SVK)	13.71
5.	Antti Haapakoski (FIN)	13.76
6.	Sergey Usov (BLR)	13.90
7.	Mohamed Abdel Aal (EGY)	14.38
8.	Noureddine Tadjine (ALG)	14.50

== See also ==
- 1990 Men's European Championships 110m Hurdles (Split)
- 1991 Men's World Championships 110m Hurdles (Tokyo)
- 1992 Men's Olympic 110m Hurdles (Barcelona)
- 1994 Men's European Championships 110m Hurdles (Helsinki)
- 1995 Men's World Championships 110m Hurdles (Gothenburg)
