= 1988 World Junior Championships in Athletics – Men's 110 metres hurdles =

The men's 110 metres hurdles event at the 1988 World Junior Championships in Athletics was held in Sudbury, Ontario, Canada, at Laurentian University Stadium on 29 and 30 July. 106.7 cm (3'6) (senior implement) hurdles were used.

== Medalists ==
Gold	Reynaldo Quintero; Cuba
Silver	Steve Brown; United States
Bronze	Elbert Ellis; United States

== Results ==
=== Final ===
30 July
Wind: +3.0 m/s

Rank	Name	Nationality	Time	Notes
1st place, gold medalist(s)	Reynaldo Quintero	Cuba	13.71 w	
2nd place, silver medalist(s)	Steve Brown	United States	13.73 w	
3rd place, bronze medalist(s)	Elbert Ellis	United States	13.78 w	
4	Vladimir Belokon	Soviet Union	13.82 w	
5	Paul Gray	United Kingdom	14.02 w	
6	Mircea Oaida	Romania	14.03 w	
7	Dan Philibert	France	14.08 w	
8	Diego Puppo	Italy	14.19 w	

=== Semifinals ===
30 July

==== Semifinal 1 ====
Wind: +2.4 m/s

Rank	Name	Nationality	Time	Notes
1	Steve Brown	United States	13.91 w	Q
2	Dan Philibert	France	13.92 w	Q
3	Mircea Oaida	Romania	13.97 w	Q
4	Diego Puppo	Italy	14.03 w	q
5	Hans-Peter Lott	West Germany	14.11 w	
6	Piotr Klewenhagen	Poland	14.17 w	
7	Mikhail Edel	Soviet Union	14.18 w	
8	Chen Chin-Hsiung	Chinese Taipei	14.99 w	

==== Semifinal 2 ====
Wind: +1.6 m/s

Rank	Name	Nationality	Time	Notes
1	Reynaldo Quintero	Cuba	13.91	Q
2	Elbert Ellis	United States	13.95	Q
3	Paul Gray	United Kingdom	13.97	Q
4	Vladimir Belokon	Soviet Union	14.04	q
5	Masamutsu Hiraishi	Japan	14.40	
6	Niklas Eriksson	Sweden	14.53	
7	Michael Schweisfurth	West Germany	14.56	
8	Gian Luca Cariccia	Italy	14.66	

=== Heats ===
29 July

==== Heat 1 ====
Wind: +4.4 m/s

Rank	Name	Nationality	Time	Notes
1	Steve Brown	United States	14.07 w	Q
2	Reynaldo Quintero	Cuba	14.13 w	Q
3	Piotr Klewenhagen	Poland	14.29 w	Q
4	Chen Chin-Hsiung	Chinese Taipei	14.48 w	q
5	Michael Schweisfurth	West Germany	14.49 w	q
6	Rhys Davies	United Kingdom	14.61 w	

==== Heat 2 ====
Wind: +2.5 m/s

Rank	Name	Nationality	Time	Notes
1	Elbert Ellis	United States	13.98 w	Q
2	Vladimir Belokon	Soviet Union	14.01 w	Q
3	Dan Philibert	France	14.09 w	Q
4	Masamutsu Hiraishi	Japan	14.44 w	q
5	Fouad Ghanem	Bahrain	14.57 w	
6	Fabio Aleixo	Brazil	15.06 w	
7	Ruhan Işım	Turkey	15.09 w	

==== Heat 3 ====
Wind: +1.8 m/s

Rank	Name	Nationality	Time	Notes
1	Mircea Oaida	Romania	14.02	Q
2	Paul Gray	United Kingdom	14.03	Q
3	Mikhail Edel	Soviet Union	14.31	Q
4	Gian Luca Cariccia	Italy	14.41	q
5	Antti Haapakoski	Finland	14.53	
6	Ziad Al-Khader	Kuwait	14.69	

==== Heat 4 ====
Wind: +2.6 m/s

Rank	Name	Nationality	Time	Notes
1	Hans-Peter Lott	West Germany	14.12 w	Q
2	Diego Puppo	Italy	14.20 w	Q
3	Niklas Eriksson	Sweden	14.53 w	Q
4	Roberto Carmona	Mexico	14.65 w	
5	Anders Hoven	Norway	15.27 w	
6	Benjamin Grant	Sierra Leone	15.79 w	

== Participation ==
According to an unofficial count, 25 athletes from 20 countries participated in the event.

- Bahrain (1)
- Brazil (1)
- Chinese Taipei (1)
- Cuba (1)
- Finland (1)
- France (1)
- Italy (2)
- Japan (1)
- Kuwait (1)
- Mexico (1)
- Norway (1)
- Poland (1)
- Romania (1)
- Sierra Leone (1)
- Soviet Union (2)
- Sweden (1)
- Turkey (1)
- United Kingdom (2)
- United States (2)
- West Germany (2)
