= Aleksandr Markin (hurdler) =

Personal information
- Born: 8 September 1962 (age 64) Losino-Petrovsky, Soviet Union
- Height: 1.85 m (6 ft 1 in)
- Weight: 78 kg (172 lb)

Sport
- Sport: Athletics
- Events: 110 m hurdles, 60 m hurdles
- Club: CSKA Moscow

Aleksandr Viktorovich Markin (Russian: Александр Викторович Маркин; born 8 September 1962) is a retired Russian athlete who specialised in the sprint hurdles. He competed at the 1988 Summer Olympics, as well as one outdoor and two indoor World Championships.

His personal bests are 13.20 seconds in the 110 metres hurdles (+1.8 m/s, Leningrad 1988) and 7.53 seconds in the 60 metres hurdles (Lipetsk 1989).

== International competitions ==
Year	Competition	Venue	Position	Event	Notes
Representing the Soviet Union
1986	Goodwill Games	Moscow, Soviet Union	5th	110 m hurdles	13.48
1986	European Championships	Stuttgart, West Germany	11th (sf)	110 m hurdles	13.78
1987	European Indoor Championships	Liévin, France	7th (sf)	60 m hurdles	7.72
1987	World Championships	Rome, Italy	10th (sf)	110 m hurdles	13.63
1988	Olympic Games	Seoul, South Korea	22nd (qf)	110 m hurdles	14.19
1989	World Indoor Championships	Budapest, Hungary	8th (sf)	60 m hurdles	7.75
1990	European Indoor Championships	Glasgow, United Kingdom	12th (sf)	60 m hurdles	7.84
Representing Unified Team
1992	European Indoor Championships	Genoa, Italy	7th (sf)	60 m hurdles	7.76
Representing Russia
1993	World Indoor Championships	Toronto, Canada	19th (h)	60 m hurdles	7.90
