= 1990 European Athletics Indoor Championships – Men's 60 metres hurdles =

The men's 60 metres hurdles event at the 1990 European Athletics Indoor Championships was held in Kelvin Hall on 4 March.

== Medalists ==
Gold	Silver	Bronze
Igors Kazanovs; Soviet Union	Tony Jarrett; Great Britain	Florian Schwarthoff; West Germany

== Results ==
=== Heats ===
First 2 from each heat (Q) and the next 2 fastest (q) qualified for the semifinals.

Rank	Heat	Name	Nationality	Time	Notes
1	1	Tony Jarrett	Great Britain	7.54	Q
2	4	Tomasz Nagórka	Poland	7.60	Q
3	5	Jiří Hudec	Czechoslovakia	7.71	Q
4	2	Dietmar Koszewski	West Germany	7.75	Q
4	5	Stefan Mattern	West Germany	7.75	Q
6	4	Igors Kazanovs	Soviet Union	7.77	Q
7	1	Thomas J. Kearns	Ireland	7.80	Q
8	1	Florian Schwarthoff	West Germany	7.80	q
9	2	Liviu Giurgian	Romania	7.81	Q
10	3	Carles Sala	Spain	7.82	Q
11	3	Laurent Ottoz	Italy	7.82	Q
12	2	Dan Philibert	France	7.82	q
12	4	Mike Fenner	East Germany	7.82	
14	3	Hugh Teape	Great Britain	7.83	
15	1	Javier Moracho	Spain	7.84	
16	5	Idriss Gonschinska	East Germany	7.89	
17	2	Ulf Söderman	Sweden	7.90	
18	2	Holger Pohland	East Germany	7.93	
18	5	Niklas Eriksson	Sweden	7.93	
20	4	Sébastien Thibault	France	7.94	
21	1	Per Nicolaisen	Norway	7.99	
21	4	Igor Kováč	Czechoslovakia	7.99	
23	3	Michael Loizias	Cyprus	8.45	
24	3	Aleš Höffer	Czechoslovakia	8.50	
	3	Philippe Tourret	France	DNF	
	5	David Nelson	Great Britain	DNF	

=== Semifinals ===
First 2 from each semifinal (Q) and the next 2 fastest (q) qualified for the final.

Rank	Heat	Name	Nationality	Time	Notes
1	1	Tony Jarrett	Great Britain	7.54	Q
2	2	Tomasz Nagórka	Poland	7.58	Q
3	2	Igors Kazanovs	Soviet Union	7.62	Q
4	2	Florian Schwarthoff	West Germany	7.64	q
5	1	Jiří Hudec	Czechoslovakia	7.67	Q
6	2	Dietmar Koszewski	West Germany	7.68	q
7	1	Stefan Mattern	West Germany	7.69	
8	2	Dan Philibert	France	7.72	
9	2	Carles Sala	Spain	7.76	
10	1	Thomas J. Kearns	Ireland	7.82	
11	1	Laurent Ottoz	Italy	7.82	
12	1	Liviu Giurgian	Romania	7.84	

=== Final ===
Rank	Lane	Name	Nationality	Time	Notes
1st place, gold medalist(s)	4	Igors Kazanovs	Soviet Union	7.52	
2nd place, silver medalist(s)	3	Tony Jarrett	Great Britain	7.58	
3rd place, bronze medalist(s)	5	Florian Schwarthoff	West Germany	7.61	
4	6	Dietmar Koszewski	West Germany	7.63	
5	2	Tomasz Nagórka	Poland	7.64	
	1	Jiří Hudec	Czechoslovakia	DNF	
