= Thomas Kearns (athlete) =

Irish hurdler

T.J. Kearns
Personal information
- Full name: Thomas Joseph Kearns
- Nickname: T.J.
- National team: Ireland
- Born: June 2, 1966 (age 60)

Sport
- Sport: Athletics
- Event: High hurdles

Thomas Joseph "T.J." Kearns (born 2 June 1966) is a retired Irish athlete who specialised in the high hurdles. He represented his country at three consecutive Summer Olympics, starting in 1988, as well as three consecutive World Championships starting in 1987.

His personal bests are 13.55 seconds in the 110 metres hurdles (Atlanta 1996) and 7.69 seconds in the indoor 60 metres hurdles (Seville 1991).

== Competition record ==
Year	Competition	Venue	Position	Event	Notes
Representing Ireland
1987	World Championships	Rome, Italy	26th (h)	110 m hurdles	14.02
1988	Olympic Games	Seoul, South Korea	26th (qf)	110 m hurdles	14.30
1989	European Indoor Championships	The Hague, Netherlands	27th (h)	60 m hurdles	8.08
1990	European Indoor Championships	Glasgow, United Kingdom	10th (sf)	60 m hurdles	7.82
1990	European Championships	Split, Yugoslavia	15th (sf)	110 m hurdles	14.14
1991	World Indoor Championships	Seville, Spain	11th (sf)	60 m hurdles	7.69
1991	World Championships	Tokyo, Japan	15th (sf)	110 m hurdles	14.02
1992	European Indoor Championships	Genoa, Italy	14th (h)	60 m hurdles	7.99
1992	Olympic Games	Barcelona, Spain	19th (qf)	110 m hurdles	13.87
1993	World Indoor Championships	Toronto, Canada	15th (sf)	60 m hurdles	7.89
1993	World Championships	Stuttgart, Germany	17th (sf)	110 m hurdles	13.68
1994	European Indoor Championships	Paris, France	20th (h)	60 m hurdles	7.86
1994	European Championships	Helsinki, Finland	10th (sf)	110 m hurdles	13.60
1996	European Indoor Championships	Stockholm, Sweden	12th (h)	60 m hurdles	7.91
1996	Olympic Games	Atlanta, United States	15th (qf)	110 m hurdles	13.55
