= Rafał Cieśla =

Polish hurdler

Personal information
- Born: 16 March 1967 (age 58)

Sport
- Sport: Athletics
- Event(s): 110 m hurdles, 60 m hurdles
- Club: AZS AWF Katowice

Rafał Cieśla (born 16 March 1967) is a retired Polish athlete specialising in the sprint hurdles. He represented his country at two World Indoor Championships and two European Indoor Championships.

His personal bests are 13.66 seconds in the 110 metres hurdles (+1.6 m/s, Warsaw 1992) and 7.63 seconds in the 60 metres hurdles (Spała 1992).

== International competitions ==
Year	Competition	Venue	Position	Event	Notes
Representing Poland
1989	European Indoor Championships	The Hague, Netherlands	10th (sf)	60 m hurdles	7.79
1989	World Indoor Championships	Budapest, Hungary	13th (h)	60 m hurdles	7.84
1991	World Indoor Championships	Seville, Spain	19th (h)	60 m hurdles	7.84
1992	European Indoor Championships	Genoa, Italy	7th	60 m hurdles	7.83
