= 1989 IAAF World Indoor Championships – Men's 60 metres hurdles =

The men's 60 metres hurdles event at the 1989 IAAF World Indoor Championships was held at the Budapest Sportcsarnok in Budapest on 3 March.

== Medalists ==
Gold	Silver	Bronze
Roger Kingdom; United States	Colin Jackson; Great Britain	Igor Kazanov; Soviet Union

== Results ==
=== Heats ===
First 2 of each heat (Q) and next 2 fastest (q) qualified for the semifinals.

Rank	Heat	Name	Nationality	Time	Notes
1	1	Colin Jackson	Great Britain	7.57	Q
2	4	Roger Kingdom	United States	7.63	Q
3	1	Emilio Valle	Cuba	7.68	Q
4	4	Jiří Hudec	Czechoslovakia	7.70	Q
5	2	Igor Kazanov	Soviet Union	7.72	Q
6	5	Aleksandr Markin	Soviet Union	7.75	Q
7	1	Tomasz Nagórka	Poland	7.77	q
8	4	Herwig Röttl	Austria	7.78	q
8	5	Tonie Campbell	United States	7.78	Q
10	3	Holger Pohland	East Germany	7.80	Q
11	2	George Boroi	Romania	7.82	Q
12	3	Carlos Sala	Spain	7.83	Q
13	3	Liviu Giurgian	Romania	7.84	
13	4	Rafał Cieśla	Poland	7.84	
15	5	György Bakos	Hungary	7.85	
16	2	Javier Moracho	Spain	7.94	
17	3	Ulf Söderman	Sweden	7.98	
17	5	Joilto Bonfim	Brazil	7.98	AR
19	1	Harri Rouhiainen	Finland	7.99	
20	3	Kai Kyllönen	Finland	8.06	
21	1	Lajos Sárközi	Hungary	8.13	
22	2	Noureddine Tadjine	Algeria	8.14	
23	5	Alain Cuypers	Belgium	11.98	
	4	Reinaldo Quintero	Cuba	DNF	

=== Semifinals ===
First 3 of each semifinal (Q) qualified directly for the final.

Rank	Heat	Name	Nationality	Time	Notes
1	1	Roger Kingdom	United States	7.50	Q, PB
2	2	Colin Jackson	Great Britain	7.55	Q
3	1	Emilio Valle	Cuba	7.63	Q
4	2	Igor Kazanov	Soviet Union	7.65	Q
5	1	Holger Pohland	East Germany	7.66	Q
6	2	Tonie Campbell	United States	7.74	Q
7	1	George Boroi	Romania	7.75	
8	1	Aleksandr Markin	Soviet Union	7.75	
9	1	Tomasz Nagórka	Poland	7.77	
10	2	Carlos Sala	Spain	7.80	
11	2	Jiří Hudec	Czechoslovakia	7.82	
12	2	Herwig Röttl	Austria	8.07	

=== Final ===
Rank	Name	Nationality	Time	Notes
1st place, gold medalist(s)	Roger Kingdom	United States	7.43	CR, PB
2nd place, silver medalist(s)	Colin Jackson	Great Britain	7.45	
3rd place, bronze medalist(s)	Igor Kazanov	Soviet Union	7.59	
4	Holger Pohland	East Germany	7.70	
5	Emilio Valle	Cuba	7.71	
6	Tonie Campbell	United States	7.86	
