= Niederhauser =

Niederhauser or Niederhäuser is a surname of German origin. It is a toponymic surname.

== Notable people with the name ==
- André Niederhäuser (born 1977), Swiss footballer
- Fabien Niederhäuser (born 1961), Swiss hurdler
- Hans Niederhauser (born 1929), Swiss boxer
- John Niederhauser (1916–2005), American agricultural scientist
- Patric Niederhauser (born 1991), Swiss racing driver
- Susanne Niederhauser (born 1970), Austrian bodybuilder
- Warren D. Niederhauser (1918–2005), American chemist, president of the American Chemical Society
- Wayne L. Niederhauser (born 1959), American politician and accountant
- Yanic Konan Niederhäuser (born 2003), Swiss basketball player
