= Khalid Hassan (disambiguation) =

Khalid Hassan may refer to:

- Khaled al-Hassan (1928–1994), Palestinian activist
- Khalid Hasan Shah (1934–1991), Pakistani religious leader
- Khalid Hasan (1934–2009), Pakistani journalist
- Khalid Hasan (cricketer) (1937–2013), Pakistani cricketer
- Khalid Hassan Milu (1960–2005), Bangladeshi singer
- Khaled Abdullah Hassan (born 1966), Bahraini hurdler
- Khalid Hassan (died 2007), Palestinian interpreter and reporter

== See also ==
- Khalid Hussain (disambiguation)
