= Vladimir Shishkin (hurdler) =

Personal information
- Born: 12 January 1964 Gorki, Soviet Union
- Height: 1.90 m (6 ft 3 in)
- Weight: 76 kg (168 lb)

Sport
- Sport: Athletics
- Event: 110 m hurdles
- Club: Dynamo Nizhny Novgorod

Vladimir Shishkin (Russian: Владимир Шишкин; born 12 January 1964) is a retired Russian athlete who specialised in the sprint hurdles. He competed at two Olympic Games as well as two World Championships. His best placings were fourth at the 1988 Olympics and sixth at the 1991 World Championships.

Shishkin's personal bests are 13.21 seconds in the 110 metres hurdles (+1.8 m/s, Leningrad 1988) and 7.57 seconds in the 60 metres hurdles (Ghent 1990).

== International competitions ==
Year	Competition	Venue	Position	Event	Notes
Representing the Soviet Union
1986	Goodwill Games	Moscow, Soviet Union	7th	110 m hurdles	13.50
1988	Olympic Games	Seoul, South Korea	4th	110 m hurdles	13.51
1989	European Indoor Championships	The Hague, Netherlands	9th (sf)	60 m hurdles	7.78
1990	European Championships	Split, Yugoslavia	5th	110 m hurdles	13.55
1991	World Championships	Tokyo, Japan	6th	110 m hurdles	13.39
Representing Unified Team
1992	Olympic Games	Barcelona, Spain	18th (qf)	110 m hurdles	13.81
Representing Russia
1993	World Championships	Stuttgart, Germany	27th (h)	110 m hurdles	13.89
