= Igors Kazanovs =

Latvian hurdler

Igors Kazanovs (Russian: Игорь Яковлевич Казанов; born September 24, 1963) is a former hurdler. Born in Daugavpils, he represented the Soviet Union and later Latvia. He was a soldier in the Soviet army. In the 110 metres hurdles, he finished fifth in the 1987 World Championship final and sixth in the 1993 World Championship final, having run his personal best of 13.26 seconds in the semifinals. In the 60 metres hurdles, he won four European Indoor gold medals and was a two-time medallist at the World Indoor Championships. He also competed at two Olympic Games.

He has a wife and two daughters.

== Competition record ==
Year	Competition	Venue	Position	Event	Notes
Representing the Soviet Union
1984	Friendship Games	Moscow, Soviet Union	5th	110 m hurdles	13.76
1985	European Indoor Championships	Piraeus, Greece	9th (sf)	60 m hurdles	7.75
1986	Goodwill Games	Moscow, Soviet Union	6th	110 m hurdles	13.50
1987	World Championships	Rome, Italy	5th	110 m hurdles	13.48
1989	European Indoor Championships	The Hague, Netherlands	28th (h)	60 m hurdles	8.19
1989	World Indoor Championships	Budapest, Hungary	3rd	60 m hurdles	7.59
1990	European Indoor Championships	Glasgow, United Kingdom	1st	60 m hurdles	7.52
1990	Goodwill Games	Seattle, United States	5th	110 m hurdles	13.71
1990	European Championships	Split, Yugoslavia	DNF (f)	110 m hurdles	13.54 (sf)
1991	World Indoor Championships	Seville, Spain	2nd	60 m hurdles	7.47
1991	World Championships	Tokyo, Japan	9th (sf)	110 m hurdles	13.65
Representing Latvia
1992	European Indoor Championships	Genoa, Italy	1st	60 m hurdles	7.55
1992	Olympic Games	Barcelona, Spain	11th (sf)	110 m hurdles	13.77
1993	World Indoor Championships	Toronto, Canada	5th	60 m hurdles	7.55
1993	World Championships	Stuttgart, Germany	6th	110 m hurdles	13.38
1994	European Indoor Championships	Paris, France	14th (sf)	60 m hurdles	7.75
1994	Goodwill Games	St. Petersburg, Russia	6th	110 m hurdles	14.02
1995	World Indoor Championships	Barcelona, Spain	17th (h)	60 m hurdles	7.80
1995	World Championships	Gothenburg, Sweden	12th (sf)	110 m hurdles	13.61
1996	European Indoor Championships	Stockholm, Sweden	1st	60 m hurdles	7.59
1996	Olympic Games	Atlanta, United States	16th (sf)	110 m hurdles	14.13
1997	World Indoor Championships	Paris, France	22nd (h)	60 m hurdles	7.86
1998	European Indoor Championships	Valencia, Spain	1st	60 m hurdles	7.54
1998	European Championships	Budapest, Hungary	22nd (h)	110 m hurdles	14.04
1999	World Indoor Championships	Maebashi, Japan	13th (h)	60 m hurdles	7.69
(#) indicates overall position in qualifying heats (h) or semifinals (sf) DNF (f) = Did not finish in the final
