= Tomasz Nagórka =

Polish hurdler (born 1967)

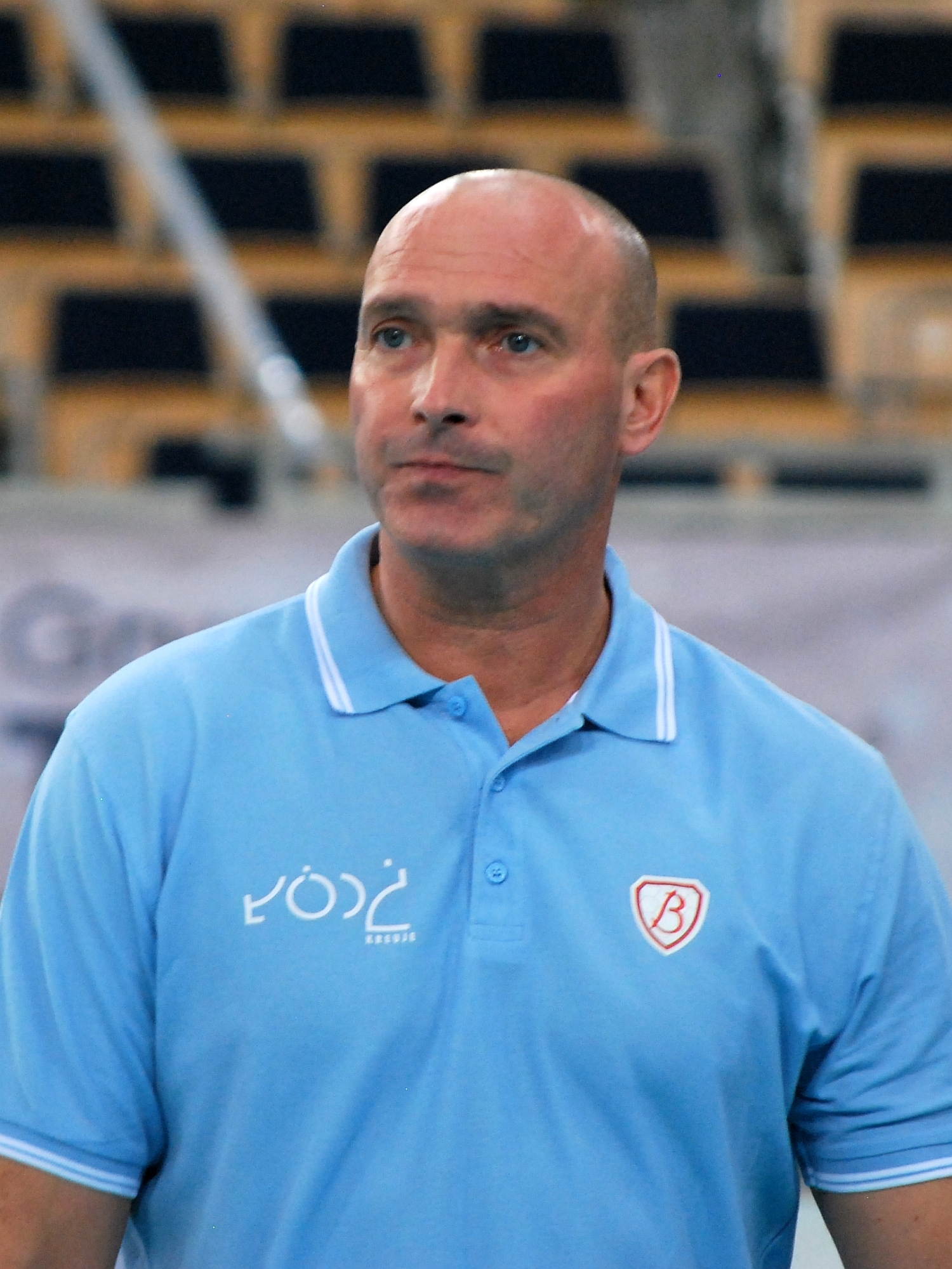
- Tomasz Nagórka in 2014

Personal information
- Nationality: Polish
- Born: 2 September 1967 Łódź, Poland

Sport
- Sport: Athletics
- Event: 110 m hurdles
- Club: Legia Warszawa
Medal record
Representing Poland
Men's athletics
European Indoor Championships
Silver medal – second place	1992 Genoa	60 m hurdles

Tomasz Nagórka (born 2 October 1967) is a retired Polish athlete specialising in the sprint hurdles. He won the silver medal at the 1992 European Indoor Championships. In addition he represented his country at the 1991 World Championships.

His personal bests are 13.35 seconds in the 110 metres hurdles (Piła 1990) and 7.54 seconds in the 60 metres hurdles (Liévin 1992).

== Competition record ==
Year	Competition	Venue	Position	Event	Notes
Representing Poland
1985	European Junior Championships	Cottbus, East Germany	10th (sf)	110 m hurdles	14.46
1989	European Indoor Championships	The Hague, Netherlands	7th	60 m hurdles	7.81
1989	World Indoor Championships	Budapest, Hungary	9th (sf)	60 m hurdles	7.77
1989	Universiade	Duisburg, West Germany	5th (sf)	110 m hurdles	13.41^{1}
1990	European Indoor Championships	Glasgow, United Kingdom	5th	60 m hurdles	7.64
1990	European Championships	Split, Yugoslavia	4th	110 m hurdles	13.55
1991	World Championships	Tokyo, Japan	–	110 m hurdles	DNF
1992	European Indoor Championships	Genoa, Italy	2nd	60 m hurdles	7.69
1994	European Indoor Championships	Paris, France	8th (sf)	60 m hurdles	7.69

^{1}Did not start in the final
