= Jiří Hudec =

Czech runner and hurdler (born 1964)

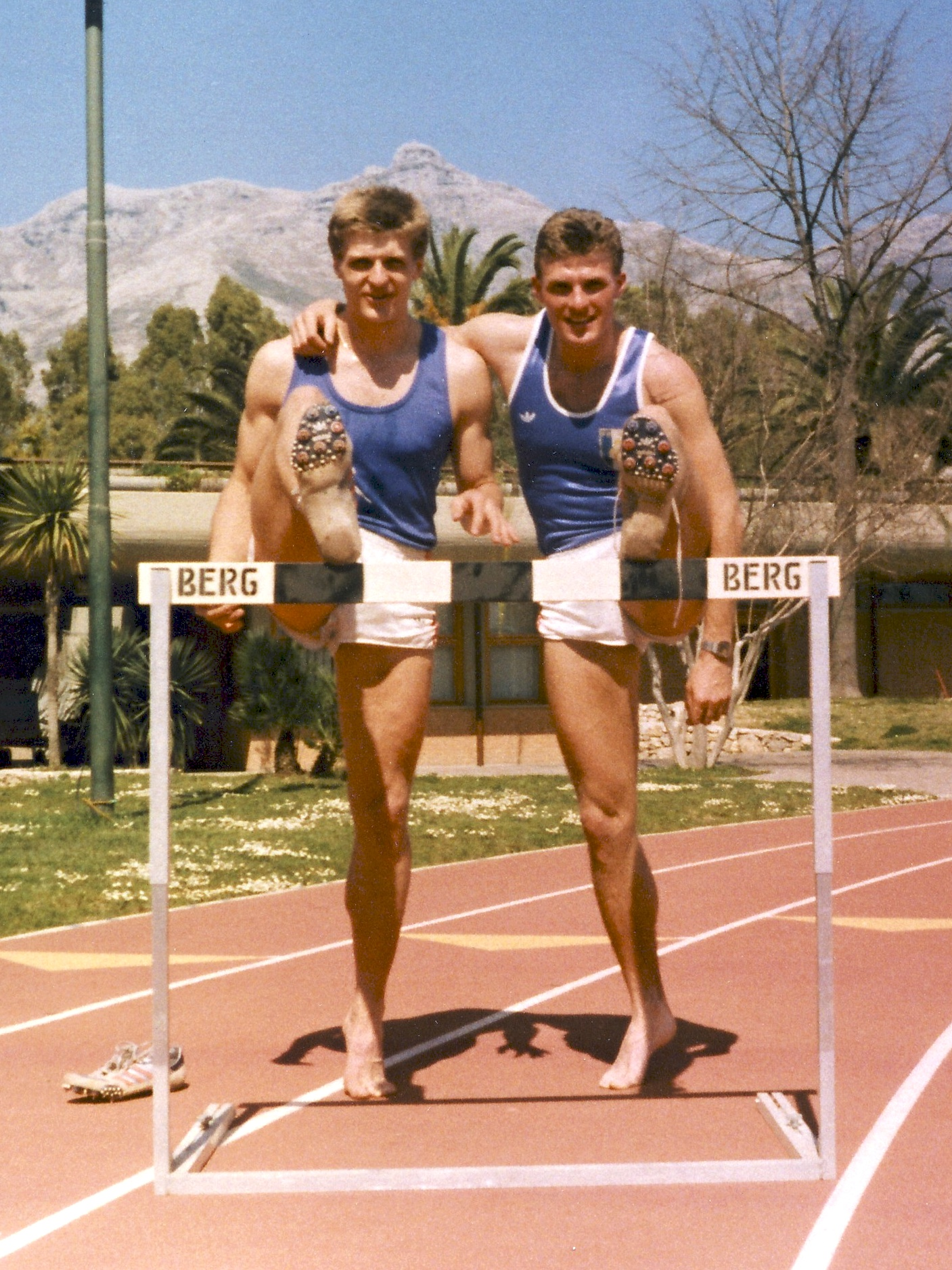
- Jiří Hudec (right) with fellow hurdler Aleš Höffer in 1989

Personal information
- Born: 15 August 1964 (age 62) Brno, Czechoslovakia

Sport
- Sport: Track and field
Medal record
Representing Czechoslovakia
European Indoor Championships
Silver medal – second place	1985 Athens	60m hurdles
Bronze medal – third place	1984 Gothenburg	60m hurdles
Bronze medal – third place	1992 Genoa	60m hurdles
European Athletics Junior Championships
Gold medal – first place	1983 Schwebat	110m hurdles

Jiří Hudec (born 15 August 1964) is a retired male track and field athlete from the Czech Republic who competed in the 110 metres hurdles. He won three medals at the European Athletics Indoor Championships, representing Czechoslovakia before it split up. Born in Brno, he twice represented his nation at the World Championships in Athletics, entering in 1987 and 1991.

His personal bests are 13.48 seconds in the 110 metres hurdles (+1.4 m/s; Rome 1987) and 7.60 seconds in the 60 metres hurdles (Karlsruhe 1989).

== International competitions ==
Year	Competition	Venue	Position	Event	Notes
Representing Czechoslovakia
1983	European Junior Championships	Schwechat, Austria	1st	110 m hurdles	13.85
1984	European Indoor Championships	Gothenburg, Sweden	3rd	60 m hurdles	7.77
1984	Friendship Games	Moscow, Soviet Union	(h)	110 m hurdles	13.78^{1}
1985	European Indoor Championships	Athens, Greece	2nd	60 m hurdles	7.68
1987	European Indoor Championships	Liévin, France	4th (sf)	60 m hurdles	7.66^{1}
1987	Universiade	Zagreb, Yugoslavia	4th	110 m hurdles	13.68
1987	World Championships	Rome, Italy	16th (sf)	110 m hurdles	14.06
1988	Olympic Games	Seoul, South Korea	10th (sf)	110 m hurdles	13.73
1989	European Indoor Championships	The Hague, Netherlands	10th (sf)	60 m	6.69
1989	European Indoor Championships	The Hague, Netherlands	4th	60 m hurdles	7.69
1989	World Indoor Championships	Budapest, Hungary	16th (h)	60 m	6.76
1989	World Indoor Championships	Budapest, Hungary	11th (sf)	60 m hurdles	7.82
1989	Universiade	Duisburg, West Germany	9th (sf)	110 m hurdles	13.70
1990	European Indoor Championships	Glasgow, United Kingdom	5th	60 m hurdles	7.64
1991	World Indoor Championships	Seville, Spain	10th (sf)	60 m hurdles	7.67
1991	World Championships	Tokyo, Japan	14th (sf)	110 m hurdles	13.95
1992	European Indoor Championships	Genoa, Italy	3rd	60 m hurdles	7.72
Representing the Czech Republic
1993	World Indoor Championships	Toronto, Canada	13th (sf)	60 m hurdles	7.83
1993	World Championships	Stuttgart, Germany	38th (h)	110 m hurdles	14.18
1994	European Indoor Championships	Paris, France	6th	60 m hurdles	7.72
1995	World Indoor Championships	Barcelona, Spain	20th (h)	60 m hurdles	7.84

^{1}Did not finish in the final
