= Oaidă =

Oaidă is a Romanian surname. Notable people with the surname include:

- Mircea Oaidă (born 1969), Romanian hurdler
- Nicolae Oaidă (1933–2025), Romanian footballer and manager
- Răzvan Oaidă (born 1998), Romanian footballer
