= Athletics at the 1998 Commonwealth Games – Men's 110 metres hurdles =

Men's 110 metres hurdles at the Commonwealth Games

The men's 110 metres hurdles event at the 1998 Commonwealth Games was held 19–20 September on National Stadium, Bukit Jalil.

== Medalists ==
Gold	Silver	Bronze
Tony Jarrett; England	Steve Brown; Trinidad and Tobago	Shaun Bownes; South Africa

== Results ==
=== Heats ===
Qualification: First 2 of each heat (Q) and the next 2 fastest qualified for the final.

Wind:
Heat 1: -0.3 m/s, Heat 2: -0.2 m/s, Heat 3: -0.4 m/s

Rank	Heat	Name	Nationality	Time	Notes
1	2	Tony Jarrett	England	13.32	Q
2	3	Steve Brown	Trinidad and Tobago	13.52	Q
3	2	Paul Gray	Wales	13.54	Q
4	1	Shaun Bownes	South Africa	13.56	Q
5	1	Andrew Tulloch	England	13.57	Q, SB
6	3	Kyle Vander Kuyp	Australia	13.63	Q
7	1	Ross Baillie	Scotland	13.80	q, SB
8	2	Greg Hines	Jamaica	13.98	q
9	2	Gabriel Burnett	Barbados	13.99	
10	1	Rodney Zuyderwyk	Australia	14.09	
11	2	Nurherman Majid	Malaysia	14.13	
12	3	Damien Greaves	England	14.14	
13	3	Matthew Love	Jamaica	14.28	
14	1	Jovesa Naivalu	Fiji	14.34	
15	2	Avele Tanielu	Samoa	14.46	
16	3	Matthew Douglas	Northern Ireland	15.13	
17	3	Kevin Furlong	Isle of Man	15.22	
18	1	Muhammad Yar	Pakistan	15.50	

=== Final ===
Wind: -0.1 m/s

Rank	Name	Nationality	Time	Notes
1st place, gold medalist(s)	Tony Jarrett	England	13.47	
2nd place, silver medalist(s)	Steve Brown	Trinidad and Tobago	13.48	
3rd place, bronze medalist(s)	Shaun Bownes	South Africa	13.53	
4	Paul Gray	Wales	13.62	
5	Kyle Vander Kuyp	Australia	13.67	
6	Andrew Tulloch	England	13.67	
7	Greg Hines	Jamaica	13.85	
8	Ross Baillie	Scotland	13.85	
