= Carlos Sala =

Spanish hurdler

Personal information
- Full name: Carlos Sala Molera
- Nickname: Charli
- Born: 20 March 1960 (age 66) Barcelona, Spain

Sport
- Country: Spain
- Sport: Athletics
Medal record
Men's athletics
Representing Spain
European Championships
Bronze medal – third place	1986 Stuttgart	110 m hurdles
European Indoor Championships
Bronze medal – third place	1988 Budapest	60m hurdles
Mediterranean Games
Silver medal – second place	1983 Casablanca	110m hurdles
Silver medal – second place	1991 Athens	110m hurdles

Carlos Sala Molera (Note: In this Spanish name, the first or paternal surname is Sala and the second or maternal family name is Molera.) (born 20 March 1960 in Barcelona, Catalonia), nicknamed "Charli", is a retired Spanish sprint hurdler. He represented his country at five consecutive Summer Olympics starting in 1980. His best result at the Games is the 7th place in 1984.

His personal best time was 13.44 seconds, achieved in August 1987 in Barcelona.

== Competition record ==
Year	Competition	Venue	Position	Event	Notes
Representing Spain
1979	European Junior Championships	Bydgoszcz, Poland	5th	110 m hurdles	14.31
1979	Mediterranean Games	Split, Yugoslavia	7th	110 m hurdles	14.33
1979	Mediterranean Games	Split, Yugoslavia	5th	4 × 100 m relay	41.33
1980	Olympic Games	Moscow, Soviet Union	13th (sf)	110 m hurdles	14.00
1983	European Indoor Championships	Budapest, Hungary	7th (sf)	60 m hurdles	7.73
1983	Mediterranean Games	Casablanca, Morocco	2nd	110 m hurdles	13.55 (w)
1983	Ibero-American Championships	Barcelona, Spain	1st	110 m hurdles	13.74 (+0.1 m/s)
1984	European Indoor Championships	Gothenburg, Sweden	14th (sf)	60 m hurdles	9.48
1984	Olympic Games	Los Angeles, United States	7th	110 m hurdles	13.80
1985	World Indoor Games	Paris, France	7th (sf)	60 m hurdles	7.85
1985	European Indoor Championships	Piraeus, Greece	7th (sf)	60 m hurdles	7.73
1985	Universiade	Kobe, Japan	4th	110 m hurdles	13.82
1986	European Indoor Championships	Madrid, Spain	4th	60 m hurdles	7.74
1986	European Championships	Stuttgart, West Germany	3rd	110 m hurdles	13.50
1986	Ibero-American Championships	Havana, Cuba	1st	110 m hurdles	13.89 (+1.9 m/s)
1986	Ibero-American Championships	Havana, Cuba	3rd	4 × 100 m relay	40.15
1987	World Indoor Championships	Indianapolis, United States	13th (h)	60 m hurdles	7.92
1987	World Championships	Rome, Italy	6th	110 m hurdles	13.55
1988	European Indoor Championships	Budapest, Hungary	3rd	60 m hurdles	7.67
1988	Ibero-American Championships	Mexico City, Mexico	2nd	110 m hurdles	13.80 (+0.0 m/s) A
1988	Olympic Games	Seoul, South Korea	11th (sf)	110 m hurdles	13.85
1989	European Indoor Championships	The Hague, Netherlands	5th	60 m hurdles	7.72
1989	World Indoor Championships	Budapest, Hungary	10th (sf)	60 m hurdles	7.80
1990	European Indoor Championships	Glasgow, United Kingdom	9th (sf)	60 m hurdles	7.76
1990	Ibero-American Championships	Manaus, Brazil	1st	110 m hurdles	13.97 (-2.5 m/s)
1990	Ibero-American Championships	Manaus, Brazil	2nd	4 × 100 m relay	40.49
1990	European Championships	Split, Yugoslavia	9th (sf)	110 m hurdles	13.61
1991	World Indoor Championships	Seville, Spain	17th (h)	60 m hurdles	7.78
1991	Mediterranean Games	Athens, Greece	2nd	110 m hurdles	13.64
1991	World Championships	Tokyo, Japan	23rd (h)	110 m hurdles	13.73
1992	European Indoor Championships	Genoa, Italy	12th (sf)	60 m hurdles	7.95
1992	Ibero-American Championships	Seville, Spain	3rd	110 m hurdles	13.76 (-0.6 m/s)
1992	Olympic Games	Barcelona, Spain	17th (qf)	110 m hurdles	13.80
1993	World Indoor Championships	Toronto, Canada	26th (h)	60 m hurdles	8.04
1995	World Indoor Championships	Barcelona, Spain	19th (h)	60 m hurdles	7.82
1995	World Championships	Gothenburg, Sweden	40th (h)	110 m hurdles	13.94
1996	European Indoor Championships	Stockholm, Sweden	10th (sf)	60 m hurdles	8.10
1996	Olympic Games	Atlanta, United States	42nd (h)	110 m hurdles	13.94
1997	World Indoor Championships	Paris, France	20th (h)	60 m hurdles	7.81
