= Moussa Omar Obaid =

Moussa Omar Obaid may refer to:

- Musa Amer Obaid (born 1985), Qatari-Kenyan middle distance runner
- Moussa Omar Obaid (hurdler) (born 1966), Syrian hurdler
