= Sergey Usov =

Personal information
- Born: January 16, 1964 (age 62) Tashkent, Soviet Union
- Height: 1.88 m (6 ft 2 in)
- Weight: 87 kg (192 lb)

Sport
- Sport: Track and field
- Events: 110 m hurdles, 60 m hurdles
- Club: Dynamo Tashkent

Sergey Usov (Russian: Сергей Усов; born 16 January 1964 in Tashkent) is a retired Belarusian athlete who specialised in the sprint hurdles. He competed at the 1992 Summer Olympics, reaching the semifinals, as well as two outdoor and two indoor World Championships.

His personal bests are 13.27 seconds in the 110 metres hurdles (+1.8 m/s, Leningrad 1988), which is also the current Uzbekistani national record, and 7.58 seconds in the 60 metres hurdles (Moscow 1991).

== Competition record ==
Year	Competition	Venue	Position	Event	Notes
Representing the Soviet Union
1983	European Junior Championships	Schwechat, Austria	2nd	110 m hurdles	13.96
1984	Friendship Games	Moscow, Soviet Union	4th	110 m hurdles	13.75
1985	World Cup	Canberra, Australia	2nd	110 m hurdles	13.62
1987	World Championships	Rome, Italy	20th (h)	110 m hurdles	13.90
1988	European Indoor Championships	Budapest, Hungary	4th	60 m hurdles	7.67
1990	Goodwill Games	Seattle, United States	6th	110 m hurdles	13.95
1990	European Championships	Split, Yugoslavia	7th	110 m hurdles	13.65
1991	World Indoor Championships	Seville, Spain	5th	60 m hurdles	7.66
Representing the Unified Team
1992	Olympic Games	Barcelona, Spain	10th (sf)	110 m hurdles	13.67
1992	World Cup	Havana, Cuba	2nd	110 m hurdles	13.55
Representing Belarus
1993	World Indoor Championships	Toronto, Canada	8th	60 m hurdles	7.90
1993	World Championships	Stuttgart, Germany	29th (h)	110 m hurdles	13.90
1994	European Indoor Championships	Paris, France	9th (sf)	60 m hurdles	7.70
