= Philippe Tourret =

French hurdler

Personal information
- Born: 8 July 1967 (age 59) Tonneins, France
- Height: 1.85 m (6 ft 1 in)
- Weight: 70 kg (154 lb)

Sport
- Sport: Track and field
- Events: 110 m hurdles, 60 m hurdles
- Club: US Créteil
Medal record
Representing France
European Indoor Championships
Bronze medal – third place	1989 The Hague	60 m hurdles

Philippe Tourret (born 8 July 1967) is a retired French athlete who specialised in the sprint hurdles. He represented his country at the 1988 and 1992 Summer Olympics. In addition he won the bronze medal at the 1989 European Indoor Championships.

His personal bests are 13.28 seconds in the 110 metres hurdles (-1.0 m/s, Monaco 1990) and 7.56 seconds in the 60 metres hurdles (Paris 1991).

== Competition record ==
Year	Competition	Venue	Position	Event	Notes
Representing France
1986	World Junior Championships	Athens, Greece	4th	110 m hurdles	14.11
1987	European Indoor Championships	Liévin, France	13th (h)	60 m hurdles	7.86
1988	European Indoor Championships	Budapest, Hungary	7th (sf)	60 m hurdles	7.74
1988	Olympic Games	Seoul, South Korea	14th (sf)	110 m hurdles	13.96
1989	European Indoor Championships	The Hague, Netherlands	3rd	60 m hurdles	7.67
1989	Universiade	Duisburg, West Germany	4th	110 m hurdles	13.69
1990	European Indoor Championships	Glasgow, United Kingdom	–	60 m hurdles	DNF
1990	European Championships	Split, Yugoslavia	6th	110 m hurdles	13.61
1991	World Indoor Championships	Seville, Spain	6th	60 m hurdles	7.66
1992	Olympic Games	Barcelona, Spain	23rd (qf)	110 m hurdles	14.09

Records
Preceded by N/A	Boys' World Youth Best Holder, 110 metres hurdles 15 July 1984 – 16 July 1999	Succeeded by (France) Ladji Doucouré
