= Ruhan Işım =

Turkish pole vaulter

Personal information
- Born: 19 May 1970 (age 56) İzmir, Turkey

Sport
- Sport: Track and field

Ruhan Işim (born 19 May 1970) is a Turkish retired pole vaulter and hurdler. He competed in both events at major championships, but usually concentrated on one of the events.

As a pole vaulter he finished fifth at the 1993 Mediterranean Games, won the 1998 Balkan Indoor Championships and the 1999 Balkan Championships. He also competed at the 1989 European Junior Championships, the 1990 European Championships, the 1995 World Championships, the 1996 European Indoor Championships, the 1997 World Championships and the 1998 European Indoor Championships without reaching the final.

His personal best jump was 5.70 metres, achieved indoors in January 1998 in Reno, then outdoors in June 2000 in Jonesboro.

In the 60 and 110 metres hurdles he finished seventh at the 1989 European Junior Championships and seventh at the 1991 Mediterranean Games. He competed at the 1988 World Junior Championships, the 1990 European Championships, the 1991 World Championships, the 1991 Summer Universiade, and the 1992 European Indoor Championships without reaching the final.

He is the father of two children and is currently working as a mechanical engineer in New Orleans.
