= 1990 European Athletics Championships – Men's 110 metres hurdles =

Men's 110 metres hurdles at the European Athletics Championships

These are the official results of the Men's 110 metres hurdles event at the 1990 European Championships in Split, Yugoslavia, held at Stadion Poljud on 30 and 31 August 1990.

== Medalists ==
Gold	Colin Jackson; United Kingdom
Silver	Tony Jarrett; United Kingdom
Bronze	Dietmar Koszewski; West Germany

== Results ==
=== Final ===
30 August Wind: 2.0 m/s

Rank	Name	Nationality	Time	Notes
1st place, gold medalist(s)	Colin Jackson	United Kingdom	13.18	
2nd place, silver medalist(s)	Tony Jarrett	United Kingdom	13.21	
3rd place, bronze medalist(s)	Dietmar Koszewski	West Germany	13.50	
4	Tomasz Nagórka	Poland	13.55	
5	Vladimir Shishkin	Soviet Union	13.55	
6	Philippe Tourret	France	13.61	
7	Sergey Usov	Soviet Union	13.65	
	Igors Kazanovs	Soviet Union	DNF	

=== Semi-finals ===
30 August

==== Semi-final 1 ====
Wind: 0 m/s

Rank	Name	Nationality	Time	Notes
1	Tony Jarrett	United Kingdom	13.45	Q
2	Dietmar Koszewski	West Germany	13.51	Q
3	Igors Kazanovs	Soviet Union	13.58	Q
4	Vladimir Shishkin	Soviet Union	13.66	Q
5	Antti Haapakoski	Finland	13.78	
6	Laurent Ottoz	Italy	13.97	
7	Thomas Kearns	Ireland	14.14	
8	Sébastien Thibault	France	14.19	

==== Semi-final 2 ====
Wind: 0 m/s

Rank	Name	Nationality	Time	Notes
1	Philippe Tourret	France	13.38	Q
2	Tomasz Nagórka	Poland	13.46	Q
3	Colin Jackson	United Kingdom	13.52	Q
4	Sergey Usov	Soviet Union	13.58	Q
5	Florian Schwarthoff	West Germany	13.59	
6	Carles Sala	Spain	13.61	
7	Nigel Walker	United Kingdom	13.84	
8	Marco Todeschini	Italy	13.87	

=== Heats ===
30 August

==== Heat 1 ====
Wind: -0.8 m/s

Rank	Name	Nationality	Time	Notes
1	Colin Jackson	United Kingdom	13.63	Q
2	Antti Haapakoski	Finland	13.77	Q
3	Sergey Usov	Soviet Union	13.90	Q
4	Herwig Röttl	Austria	14.23	
5	Gheorghe Boroi	Romania	14.39	
7	Fabien Niederhäuser	Switzerland	14.60	
	Stéphane Caristan	France	DNF	

==== Heat 2 ====
Wind: -0.9 m/s

Rank	Name	Nationality	Time	Notes
1	Tony Jarrett	United Kingdom	13.53	Q
2	Dietmar Koszewski	West Germany	13.73	Q
3	Carles Sala	Spain	13.78	Q
4	Vladimir Shishkin	Soviet Union	13.83	q
5	Kai Kyllönen	Finland	14.09	
6	Paulo Barrigana	Portugal	14.10	
	Gianni Tozzi	Italy	DQ	

==== Heat 3 ====
Wind: -1.2 m/s

Rank	Name	Nationality	Time	Notes
1	Philippe Tourret	France	13.70	Q
2	Nigel Walker	United Kingdom	13.82	Q
3	Igors Kazanovs	Soviet Union	13.83	Q
4	Marco Todeschini	Italy	13.98	q
5	Stefan Mattern	West Germany	14.03	
6	György Bakos	Hungary	14.12	
7	Nedeljko Višnjić	Yugoslavia	14.24	

==== Heat 4 ====
Wind: -1 m/s

Rank	Name	Nationality	Time	Notes
1	Tomasz Nagórka	Poland	13.87	Q
2	Sébastien Thibault	France	13.90	Q
3	Florian Schwarthoff	West Germany	13.94	Q
4	Thomas Kearns	Ireland	13.97	q
5	Laurent Ottoz	Italy	14.01	q
6	Igor Kováč	Czechoslovakia	14.06	
	Ruhan Işım	Turkey	DQ	

== Participation ==
According to an unofficial count, 28 athletes from 17 countries participated in the event.

- Austria (1)
- Czechoslovakia (1)
- Finland (2)
- France (3)
- Hungary (1)
- Ireland (1)
- Italy (3)
- Poland (1)
- Portugal (1)
- Romania (1)
- Soviet Union (3)
- Spain (1)
- Switzerland (1)
- Turkey (1)
- United Kingdom (3)
- West Germany (3)
- Yugoslavia (1)

== See also ==
- 1988 Men's Olympic 110m Hurdles (Seoul)
- 1991 Men's World Championships 110m Hurdles (Tokyo)
- 1992 Men's Olympic 110m Hurdles (Barcelona)
