= Zeyad Abdulrazak =

Kuwaiti hurdler

Personal information
- Nationality: Kuwaiti
- Born: 18 July 1969 (age 56)

Sport
- Sport: Track and field
- Event: 110 metres hurdles
Medal record
Men's athletics
Representing Kuwait
Arab U20 Championships
Silver medal – second place	1986 Cairo	110 m hurdles
Gulf Cooperation Council Championships
Gold medal – first place	1992 Riyadh	110 m hurdles
West Asian Games
Silver medal – second place	1997 Tehran	110 m hurdles

Zeyad Abdulrazak Al-Khudhur Al-Enazy (born 18 July 1969) is a Kuwaiti hurdler. He competed in the 110 metres hurdles at the 1988 Summer Olympics and the 1992 Summer Olympics.

At the 1986 Arab Junior Athletics Championships, Abdulrazak won his first international medal, taking silver in the 110 m hurdles and only coming behind a course record performance.

Al-Enazy was the only Kuwaiti athlete to advance past the first round of competition at the 1988 Summer Olympics, finishing 5th in his heat.

Abdulzarek qualified for his first World Championships at the 1991 World Championships in Athletics, where he again competed in the 110 m hurdles. He finished 7th in his heat there and failed to advance.

In 1992, Abdulrazak won gold at the Gulf Cooperation Council Athletics Championships in the short hurdles, becoming the first Kuwaiti athlete to win that event. He also became a two-time Olympian at the 1992 Summer Olympics, finishing 9th in his sprint hurdles heat.

Abdulrazak continued competing for several years after the 1992 Olympics. At the 1997 West Asian Games, Abdulrazak earned his third international medal by winning silver in the 110 m hurdles.
