= Florian Schwarthoff =

German hurdler

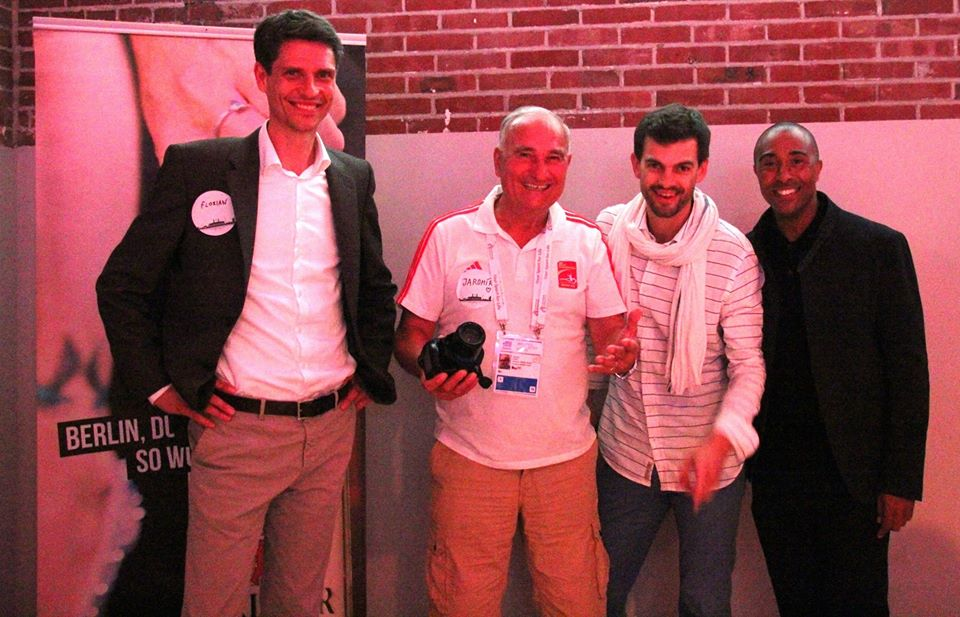
- Florian Schwarthoff, Ingo Pawelke, and Colin Jackson, 2016

Personal information
- Born: 7 May 1968 (age 58) Dortmund, West Germany
Medal record
Men's athletics
Representing Germany
Olympic Games
Bronze medal – third place	1996 Atlanta	110 m hurdles
European Championships
Silver medal – second place	1994 Helsinki	110 m hurdles
Summer Universiade
Bronze medal – third place	1989 Duisburg	100 m hurdles

Florian Schwarthoff (born 7 May 1968 in Dortmund) is a former German hurdler best known for winning a bronze medal at the 1996 Summer Olympics. Schwarthoff had his best season in 1995 when set a new German record of 13.05 sec. in Bremen. He was expected to compete for a silver or bronze medal at the World Championships in Gothenburg behind the overwhelming favourite Allen Johnson from the United States. However, Schwarthoff did not finish the semi-final as he fell over a hurdle. Schwarthoff remained for several years a world class hurdler but never won a gold medal.

== Personal bests ==
- 100 metres - 10.57 (1996)
- 200 metres - 20.86 (1991)
- 110 metres hurdles - 13.05 (1995) - German record
- Long jump - 7.69 (1986)

== Achievements ==
Year	Competition	Venue	Position	Event	Notes
Representing West Germany
1987	European Junior Championships	Birmingham, United Kingdom	2nd	110 m hurdles	13.81
1987	World Championships	Rome, Italy	15th (sf)	110 m hurdles	13.98
1988	European Indoor Championships	Budapest, Hungary	5th	60 m hurdles	7.77
1988	Olympic Games	Seoul, South Korea	17th (qf)	110 m hurdles	13.67
1989	European Indoor Championships	The Hague, Netherlands	6th	60 m hurdles	7.72
1989	Universiade	Duisburg, West Germany	3rd	110 m hurdles	13.63
1990	European Indoor Championships	Glasgow, United Kingdom	3rd	60 m hurdles	7.61
1990	European Championships	Split, Yugoslavia	8th (sf)	110 m hurdles	13.59
Representing Germany
1991	World Championships	Tokyo, Japan	7th	110 m hurdles	13.41
1991	World Championships	Tokyo, Japan	–	4 × 100 m relay	DQ
1992	Olympic Games	Barcelona, Spain	5th	110 m hurdles	13.29
1993	World Indoor Championships	Toronto, Canada	4th	60 m hurdles	7.54
1993	World Championships	Stuttgart, Germany	5th	110 m hurdles	13.27
1994	European Championships	Helsinki, Finland	2nd	110 m hurdles	13.16
1994	World Cup	London, United Kingdom	4th	110 m hurdles	13.47
1995	World Championships	Gothenburg, Sweden	2nd (qf)	110 m hurdles	13.24
1996	Olympic Games	Atlanta, United States	3rd	110 m hurdles	13.17
1996	Olympic Games	Atlanta, United States	3rd (h)	4 × 100 m relay	38.77
1997	World Championships	Athens, Greece	4th	110 m hurdles	13.20
1998	European Championships	Budapest, Hungary	4th	110 m hurdles	13.23
1999	World Championships	Seville, Spain	7th	110 m hurdles	13.39
2000	Olympic Games	Sydney, Australia	6th	110 m hurdles	13.42
2001	World Championships	Edmonton, Canada	11th (h)	110 m hurdles	13.58
2002	European Indoor Championships	Vienna, Austria	4th	60 m hurdles	7.59
2002	European Championships	Munich, Germany	4th	110 m hurdles	13.37
