= Khalid Hussain (disambiguation) =

Khalid Hussain may refer to:

- Khalid Hossain (1935–2019), Bangladeshi Nazrul Geeti singer
- Khalid Hussain Magsi (born 1960), Pakistani politician
- Khaled Hosseini (born 1965), Afghan-American novelist and physician
- Khalid Hussain (born 1969), Norwegian-Pakistani writer and film producer
- Khaled Hussein (born 1977), Libyan football midfielder
- Khaled Houcine, Tunisian sprint canoeist

== See also ==
- Khalid Hassan (disambiguation)
