= Paul Gray (hurdler) =

Welsh hurdler (born 1969)

Personal information
- Nationality: British (Welsh)
- Born: 25 May 1969 (age 57) Cardiff, Wales

Sport
- Sport: Athletics
- Event: Hurdles
- Club: Cardiff AAC
Medal record
Representing Wales
Commonwealth Games
Bronze medal – third place	1994 Victoria	110 m hurdles
Bronze medal – third place	1998 Kuala Lumpur	4x400m relay

Paul Gray (born 25 May 1969) is a Welsh retired athlete who competed in the 110 metres hurdles and 400 metres hurdles.

== Biography ==
Shortly after winning the Junior 1987 Junior AAA title, Gray won bronze at the 1987 European Athletics Junior Championships.

Gray won the bronze medal at the 1994 Commonwealth Games at the 1994 Commonwealth Games in Victoria, Canada. In addition, he represented Great Britain at two World Championships, in 1999 and 2001, without reaching the semifinals.

His personal bests are 13.53 seconds in the 110 metres hurdles (Victoria 1994) and 49.16 in the 400 metres hurdles (Budapest 1998).

Gray twice finished runner-up in the 110 metres hurdles event at the AAA Championships, behind Andy Tulloch at the 1994 AAA Championships and ten years later behind Robert Newton at the 2004 AAA Championships.

== Competition record ==
Year	Competition	Venue	Position	Event	Notes
Representing Great Britain and Wales
1987	European Junior Championships	Birmingham, United Kingdom	3rd	110 m hurdles	14.16
1988	World Junior Championships	Sudbury, Canada	5th	110 m hurdles	14.02 w (wind: +3.0 m/s)
1994	Commonwealth Games	Victoria, Canada	3rd	110 m hurdles	13.54
1994	Commonwealth Games	Victoria, Canada	7th	4 × 400 m relay	3:07.80
1998	European Championships	Budapest, Hungary	11th (sf)	400 m hurdles	50.34
1998	Commonwealth Games	Kuala Lumpur, Malaysia	4th	110 m hurdles	13.62
1998	Commonwealth Games	Kuala Lumpur, Malaysia	3rd	4 × 400 m relay	3:01.86
1999	World Championships	Seville, Spain	33rd (h)	400 m hurdles	50.15
2001	World Championships	Edmonton, Canada	33rd (h)	110 m hurdles	13.96
2002	Commonwealth Games	Manchester, United Kingdom	10th (h)	110 m hurdles	14.11
