= Vadim Kurach =

Personal information
- Nationality: Soviet
- Born: 28 March 1970
- Died: 21 January 2017 (aged 46)

Sport
- Sport: Track and field
- Event: 110 metres hurdles

Vadim Kurac (28 March 1970 – 21 January 2017) was a Soviet hurdler. He competed in the men's 110 metres hurdles at the 1992 Summer Olympics, representing the Unified Team.
