= Athletics at the Friendship Games – Men's 110 metres hurdles =

The men's 110 metres hurdles event at the Friendship Games was held on 18 August 1984 at the Grand Arena of the Central Lenin Stadium in Moscow, Soviet Union.

== Medalists ==
| Gold | Silver | Bronze |
|---|---|---|
| György Bakos; Hungary | Vyacheslav Ustinov; Soviet Union | Thomas Munkelt; East Germany |

== Results ==
=== Heats ===
Wind:
Heat 1: -1.1 m/s, Heat 2: -0.3 m/s

| Rank | Heat | Name | Nationality | Time | Notes |
|---|---|---|---|---|---|
| 1 | 1 | György Bakos | Hungary | 13.56 | Q |
| 2 | 1 | Vyacheslav Ustinov | Soviet Union | 13.60 | Q |
| 3 | 1 | Plamen Krastev | Bulgaria | 13.71 | Q |
| 4 | 1 | Jiří Hudec | Czechoslovakia | 13.78 | q |
| 5 | 2 | Alejandro Casañas | Cuba | 13.85 | Q |
| 5 | 2 | Sergey Usov | Soviet Union | 13.85 | Q |
| 5 | 2 | Igor Kazanov | Soviet Union | 13.85 | Q |
| 5 | 1 | Thomas Munkelt | East Germany | 13.85 | q |
| 9 | 2 | Ventsislav Radev | Bulgaria | 13.89 | |
| 10 | 2 | Romuald Giegiel | Poland | 13.91 | |
| – | 1 | Anatoliy Titov | Soviet Union | 13.92 | |
| 11 | 2 | Aleš Höffer | Czechoslovakia | 13.95 | |
| 12 | 1 | Nikolay Shilev | Bulgaria | 15.53 | |
| 13 | 2 | Francisco González | Colombia | 15.70 | |
| 14 | 2 | A. Fattah Amhaz | Lebanon | 16.01 | |

=== Final ===
Wind: -0.5 m/s

| Rank | Name | Nationality | Time | Notes |
|---|---|---|---|---|
| 1st place, gold medalist(s) | György Bakos | Hungary | 13.52 | |
| 2nd place, silver medalist(s) | Vyacheslav Ustinov | Soviet Union | 13.57 | |
| 3rd place, bronze medalist(s) | Thomas Munkelt | East Germany | 13.64 | |
| 4 | Sergey Usov | Soviet Union | 13.75 | |
| 5 | Igor Kazanov | Soviet Union | 13.76 | |
| 6 | Plamen Krastev | Bulgaria | 13.84 | |
| 7 | Alejandro Casañas | Cuba | 25.60 | |
| | Jiří Hudec | Czechoslovakia | DNF | |

== See also ==
- Athletics at the 1984 Summer Olympics – Men's 110 metres hurdles
