= Nicky Morris =

English runner

Personal information
- Nationality: British (English)
- Born: 13 March 1962 (age 63)

Sport
- Sport: Athletics
- Event(s): middle & long-distance
- Club: Essex Ladies AC

Nicola Morris (born 13 March 1962) is an English former middle and long-distance runner.

== Biography ==
After winning the 1989 AAA Indoor Championships 3000 metres title, she went on to win a silver medal in the 3000m at the 1989 European Indoor Championships, Morris then finished fifth at the 1989 World Indoor Championships.

== International competitions ==
Year	Competition	Venue	Position	Event	Notes
Representing Great Britain
1989	European Indoor Championships	The Hague, Netherlands	2nd	3000 m	9:12.37
1989	World Indoor Championships	Budapest, Hungary	5th	3000 m	8:53.52
1989	World Cross Country Championships	Stavanger, Norway	65th	6 km	24:19
Representing England
1990	Commonwealth Games	Auckland, New Zealand	DNF	3000 m	—
