= Piotr Wójcik =

Polish hurdler

Piotr Wójcik (born 7 February 1965 in Giżycko) is a retired Polish athlete specialising in the sprint hurdles. He represented his country at one indoor and two outdoor World Championships.

His personal bests are 13.47 seconds in the 110 metres hurdles (Tokyo 1991) and 7.70 seconds in the 60 metres hurdles (Seville 1991).

== Competition record ==
| Year | Competition | Venue | Position | Event | Notes |
Representing Poland
| 1991 | World Indoor Championships | Seville, Spain | 12th (sf) | 60 m hurdles | 7.73 |
| 1991 | World Championships | Tokyo, Japan | 10th (h) | 110 m hurdles | 13.47 |
| 1993 | World Championships | Stuttgart, Germany | 16th (sf) | 110 m hurdles | 13.67 |
| 1994 | European Indoor Championships | Paris, France | 11th (sf) | 60 m hurdles | 7.73 |
