= Joilto Bonfim =

Brazilian athlete (born 1965)

Personal information
- Full name: Joilto dos Santos Bonfim
- Born: 11 February 1965 (age 61) Brasília, Brazil
- Height: 1.81 m (5 ft 11 in)
- Weight: 70 kg (150 lb)

Sport
- Sport: Athletics
- Event: 110 m hurdles
- Club: União Esportiva Funilense

Joilto dos Santos Bonfim (born 11 February 1965) is a retired Brazilian athlete who specialised in the sprint hurdles. He represented his country at the 1992 Summer Olympics as well as four consecutive World Championships starting in 1987. In addition, he won multiple medals on regional level.

His personal bests are 13.67 seconds in the 110 metres hurdles (Brasilia 1992) and 7.98 seconds in the 60 metres hurdles (Budapest 1989).

His brother Jailto Bonfim was also an Olympic athlete.

== International competitions ==
Year	Competition	Venue	Position	Event	Notes
Representing Brazil
1985	South American Championships	Santiago, Chile	2nd	110 m hurdles	14.21
1987	Universiade	Zagreb, Yugoslavia	5th	110 m hurdles	14.06
1987	World Championships	Rome, Italy	20th (qf)	100 m	10.46
1987	World Championships	Rome, Italy	9th (sf)	4 × 100 m relay	39.22
1987	South American Championships	São Paulo, Brazil	2nd	110 m hurdles	14.54
1988	Ibero-American Championships	Mexico City, Mexico	5th	110 m hurdles	13.93
1988	Ibero-American Championships	Mexico City, Mexico	3rd (h)	4 × 100 m relay	39.21^{1}
1989	World Indoor Championships	Budapest, Hungary	17th (h)	60 m hurdles	7.98
1989	South American Championships	Medellín, Colombia	4th	110 m hurdles	14.1
1990	Ibero-American Championships	Manaus, Brazil	2nd	110 m hurdles	14.04
1991	South American Championships	Manaus, Brazil	1st	110 m hurdles	14.11
1991	South American Championships	Manaus, Brazil	1st	4 × 100 m relay	39.90
1991	Pan American Games	Havana, Cuba	7th	110 m hurdles	14.06
1991	World Championships	Tokyo, Japan	22nd (h)	110 m hurdles	13.72
1992	Ibero-American Championships	Seville, Spain	4th	110 m hurdles	13.88
1992	Olympic Games	Barcelona, Spain	31st (h)	110 m hurdles	14.06
1993	South American Championships	Lima, Peru	2nd	110 m hurdles	14.38
1993	World Championships	Stuttgart, Germany	34th (h)	110 m hurdles	14.00
1995	South American Championships	Manaus, Brazil	1st	110 m hurdles	13.92
1995	World Championships	Gothenburg, Sweden	35th (h)	110 m hurdles	13.91

^{1}Disqualified in the final
