= Dan Philibert =

French hurdler

Dan Philibert (born 6 August 1970 in Paris) is a retired French hurdler.

His personal best time was 13.26 seconds, achieved at the 1997 World Championships in Athens.

== Achievements ==
Year	Competition	Venue	Position	Event	Notes
Representing France
1988	World Junior Championships	Sudbury, Canada	7th	110m hurdles	14.08 w (+3.0 m/s)
1990	European Indoor Championships	Glasgow, United Kingdom	8th (sf)	60 m hurdles	7.72
1991	World Indoor Championships	Seville, Spain	15th (sf)	60 m hurdles	7.77
1991	Mediterranean Games	Athens, Greece	1st	110 m hurdles	13.56 CR
1991	World Championships	Tokyo, Japan	5th	110 m hurdles	13.33 PB
1992	European Indoor Championships	Genoa, Italy	17th (h)	60 m hurdles	7.91
1993	Mediterranean Games	Narbonne, France	1st	110 m hurdles	13.56 CR
1993	World Championships	Stuttgart, Germany	9th (sf)	110 m hurdles	13.42
1994	European Indoor Championships	Paris, France	4th	60 m hurdles	7.60
1994	European Championships	Helsinki, Finland	7th	110 m hurdles	13.54 (+1.1 m/s)
1994	Jeux de la Francophonie	Paris, France	1st	110 m hurdles	13.55
1995	World Championships	Gothenburg, Sweden	6th	110 m hurdles	13.34
1997	World Championships	Athens, Greece	5th	110 m hurdles	13.26 PB
1998	European Indoor Championships	Valencia, Spain	5th	60 m hurdles	7.60
1998	European Championships	Budapest, Hungary	8th (sf)	110 m hurdles	13.43
1999	World Championships	Seville, Spain	11th (sf)	110 m hurdles	13.49
