= Athletics at the 1987 Summer Universiade – Men's 110 metres hurdles =

The men's 110 metres hurdles event at the 1987 Summer Universiade was held at the Stadion Maksimir in Zagreb on 14 and 15 July 1987.

== Medalists ==
Gold	Silver	Bronze
Jon Ridgeon; Great Britain	Arthur Blake; United States	Keith Talley; United States

== Results ==
=== Heats ===
Held on 14 July

Wind:
Heat 1: -0.2 m/s, Heat 2: ? m/s, Heat 3: 0.0 m/s, Heat 4: 0.0 m/s

Rank	Heat	Athlete	Nationality	Time	Notes
1	3	Arthur Blake	United States	13.65	Q
2	4	Keith Talley	United States	13.85	Q
3	2	Jon Ridgeon	Great Britain	14.01	Q
3	1	Jiří Hudec	Czechoslovakia	14.17	Q
4	2	Antonio Lanau	Spain	14.22	Q
5	3	Ales Kolar	Yugoslavia	14.34	Q
6	4	Thierry Richard	France	14.35	Q
7	2	Zhou Zhong	China	14.36	Q
8	3	Joilto Bonfim	Brazil	14.37	Q
9	2	Michel Brodeur	Canada	14.43	q
10	3	Thomas Weimann	Austria	14.48	q
11	3	John Caliguri	Australia	14.50	q
12	1	Pascal Boussemart	France	14.51	Q
13	4	Norbert Tomaschek	Austria	14.54	Q
14	1	Chen Kuang-min	Chinese Taipei	14.56	Q
15	4	Judex Lefou	Mauritius	14.65	q
16	4	Assane Niang	Senegal	14.68	
17	4	Mbanefo Akpom	Nigeria	14.70	
18	4	Paul Lloyd	New Zealand	15.03	
19	3	Javier del Río	Peru	15.22	
20	2	Zulkifli Mohamed Yatim	Malaysia	15.40	
21	2	Abdulrahman Al-Marimi	Libya	16.24	
22	1	Gitau Mwangi	Kenya	16.66	

=== Semifinals ===
Held on 15 July

Wind:
Heat 1: -1.7 m/s, Heat 2: +1.2 m/s

Rank	Heat	Athlete	Nationality	Time	Notes
1	2	Jon Ridgeon	Great Britain	13.38	Q
2	2	Keith Talley	United States	13.49	Q
3	1	Arthur Blake	United States	13.56	Q
4	1	Jiří Hudec	Czechoslovakia	14.02	Q
5	1	Thierry Richard	France	14.16	Q
6	2	Zhou Zhong	China	14.18	Q
7	2	Ales Kolar	Yugoslavia	14.22	Q
8	2	Pascal Boussemart	France	14.25	
9	2	Judex Lefou	Mauritius	14.30	
10	1	Joilto Bonfim	Brazil	14.34	Q
10	2	Chen Kuang -min	Chinese Taipei	14.34	
12	2	Thomas Weimann	Austria	14.38	
13	1	Antonio Lanau	Spain	14.48	
14	1	Michel Brodeur	Canada	14.75	
15	1	John Caliguri	Australia	14.79	
16	1	Norbert Tomaschek	Austria	14.80	

=== Final ===
Held on 15 July

Wind: -0.1 m/s

Rank	Athlete	Nationality	Time	Notes
1st place, gold medalist(s)	Jon Ridgeon	Great Britain	13.29	NR
2nd place, silver medalist(s)	Arthur Blake	United States	13.38	
3rd place, bronze medalist(s)	Keith Talley	United States	13.40	
4	Jiří Hudec	Czechoslovakia	13.68	
5	Joilto Bonfim	Brazil	14.06	
6	Ales Kolar	Yugoslavia	14.12	
7	Thierry Richard	France	14.17	
8	Zhou Zhong	China	14.28	
