= Khaled Abdullah Hassan =

Bahraini hurdler

Personal information
- Nationality: Bahraini
- Born: 6 February 1966 (age 60)

Sport
- Sport: Track and field
- Event: 110 metres hurdles

Khaled Abdullah Hassan (born 6 February 1966) is a Bahraini hurdler. He competed in the men's 110 metres hurdles at the 1992 Summer Olympics.
