= Hans-Peter Lott =

German long jumper (born 1969)

Personal information
- Nationality: German
- Born: 9 March 1969 (age 57) Worms, Germany

Sport
- Sport: Athletics
- Event: Long jump

Hans-Peter Lott (born 9 March 1969) is a German athlete. He competed in the men's long jump at the 1996 Summer Olympics.
