= Nigel Walker (athlete) =

Wales international rugby union player, WRU administrator & Olympic track athlete

- Born: 15 June 1963 (age 63) Cardiff, Wales
- Height: 1.80 m (5 ft 11 in)
- Weight: 79 kg (12 st 6 lb)

Rugby union career
- Position: Wing
Senior career
Years	Team	Apps	(Points)
1992-1998	Cardiff	121	(392)
International career
Years	Team	Apps	(Points)
1993-1998	Wales	17	(60)
- Sports career
- Sport: Athletics
- Event: hurdles
- Club: Cardiff AAC

Nigel Keith Walker (born 15 June 1963) is a former Welsh track and field athlete and Wales international rugby union player. He competed at the 1984 Summer Olympics. He is currently Welsh Rugby Union's acting CEO, after the resignation of Steve Phillips.

== Biography ==
Born in Cardiff, Walker was a member of Cardiff AAC and became the British 110 metres hurdles metres champion after winning the British AAA Championships title at the 1984 AAA Championships. Shortly afterwards he represented Great Britain at the 1984 Olympic Games in Los Angeles, in the 110 metres hurdles.

He finished second behind Henry Andrade at the 1985 AAA Championships but by virtue of being the highest placed British athlete was considered the British champion again. However, with the emergence of fellow Welsh athlete Colin Jackson he had to settle for podium finishes thereafter.

In 1988 and 1992 he failed to make the squad for the Summer Olympics and in 1992 turned to rugby union. Walker holds the fastest non-winning time for the 200-metre hurdles. At Cardiff in 1991, he ran 22.77 seconds into a 0.3 m/s headwind.

As a rugby player, he played on the wing for Cardiff RFC. Walker made his Wales debut on 6 March 1993 in the five nations match against Ireland. He went on to win 17 caps for Wales, scoring 12 tries and making his final appearance 21 February 1998 against England.

Walker was a participant in Catchphrase, a Welsh learning programme broadcast on Radio Wales in 2000. Walker was appointed Head of Sport at BBC Wales in 2001. In 2010, Walker became the National Director at the English Institute of Sport (EIS). In 2018, celebrating Black History Month in the United Kingdom, Walker was included in a list of 100 "Brilliant, Black and Welsh" people.

Walker left his role at the EIS in Autumn 2021, to take up the position of Performance Director at the Welsh Rugby Union. He became the acting CEO of the WRU in January 2023 following the resignation of Steve Phillips.

Contrary to a frequent rumour, he did participate in Gladiators. Walker dispelled the rumour: "I did compete in Gladiator as Hermes … the fast one. It’s a big myth that I didn’t compete. Glen Webbe didn’t, I did. I have corrected it on Wikipedia three times and it keeps coming back up".

== International competitions ==
Year	Competition	Venue	Position	Event	Notes
Representing Great Britain / Wales
1984	Olympic Games	Los Angeles, United States	semi-final	110 m hurdles	14.07
1985	European Indoor Championships	Piraeus, Greece	5th	60 m hurdles	7.72
1986	Commonwealth Games	Edinburgh, Scotland	4th	110 m hurdles	13.69
1986	European Championships	Stuttgart, West Germany	4th	110 m hurdles	13.52 (wind: +2.0 m/s)
1987	European Indoor Championships	Liévin, France	3rd	60 m hurdles	7.65
1987	World Indoor Championships	Indianapolis, United States	3rd	60 m hurdles	7.66
1987	World Championships	Rome, Italy	semi-final	110 m hurdles	13.68
1989	European Indoor Championships	The Hague, Netherlands	semi-final	60 m hurdles	7.80
1990	Commonwealth Games	Auckland, New Zealand	5th	110 m hurdles	13.78
1990	European Championships	Split, Yugoslavia	12th (sf)	110 m hurdles	13.84 (wind: 0.0 m/s)
1991	World Indoor Championships	Seville, Spain	semi-final	60 m hurdles	7.65
1992	European Indoor Championships	Genoa, Italy	semi-final	60 m hurdles	7.82
