= Lajos Sárközi =

Hungarian hurdler

Lajos Sárközi (born 14 July 1967) is a retired Hungarian hurdler who specializes in the 110 metres hurdles.

He competed at the 1989 World Indoor Championships and the 1989 European Indoor Championships without reaching the final. When he became Hungarian national champion in 1992, he ended a twelve-year winning streak of György Bakos. He was succeeded in 1993 by Levente Csillag, who won ten national titles. Sárközi became Hungarian indoor champion in 1991, 1992 and 1993. He became Canadian citizen on 19 April 2006.
