= Kheir El-Din Obeid =

Syrian hurdler (born 1966)

Personal information
- Nationality: Syrian
- Born: 20 November 1966 (age 59)
- Height: 1.86 m (6 ft 1 in)
- Weight: 74 kg (163 lb)

Sport
- Country: Syria
- Sport: Track and field
- Event: 110 metres hurdles
Medal record
Men's athletics
Representing Syria
Pan Arab Games
| Bronze medal – third place | 1992 Damascus | 110 m hurdles |
Arab Championships
| Gold medal – first place | 1991 Latakia | 110 m hurdles |

Kheir El-Din Obeid (Arabic: خير الدين عبيد; born 20 November 1966) is a Syrian former hurdler. He competed in the men's 110 metres hurdles at the 1992 Summer Olympics, losing in the first round.
