= Fabien Niederhäuser =

Swiss hurdler

Fabien Niederhäuser (born 15 July 1961) is a Swiss retired hurdler.

Niederhäuser competed at the 1987 World Championships and the 1990 European Championships without reaching the final.
