= Mark McKoy =

Canadian-Austrian runner (born 1961)

Personal information
- Born: December 10, 1961 (age 64) Georgetown, British Guiana

Sport
- Sport: Track and field
Medal record
Representing Canada
Olympic Games
Gold medal – first place	1992 Barcelona	110 m hurdles
IAAF World Indoor Championships
Gold medal – first place	1993 Toronto	60 m hurdles
Bronze medal – third place	1991 Seville	60 m hurdles
Commonwealth Games
Gold medal – first place	1982 Brisbane	110 m hurdles
Gold medal – first place	1986 Edinburgh	110 m hurdles
Gold medal – first place	1986 Edinburgh	4 × 100 m relay
Silver medal – second place	1982 Brisbane	4 × 100 m relay
Universiade
Bronze medal – third place	1983 Edmonton	110 m hurdles
Pacific Conference Games
Gold medal – first place	1981 Christchurch	4 × 100 m relay
Pan American Junior Championships
Bronze medal – third place	1980 Sudbury	110 m hurdles

Mark Anthony McKoy (born December 10, 1961) is a Canadian retired track and field athlete. He won the gold medal for the 110 metres hurdles at the 1992 Barcelona Olympics. He won the 60 metres hurdles title at the 1993 IAAF World Indoor Championships and the 110 metres hurdles titles at the Commonwealth Games in 1982 and 1986. He is the World record holder for the 50 metres hurdles with 6.25 secs (1986), he is also the Canadian record holder for the 60 metres hurdles with 7.41 secs (1993) and the 110 metres hurdles with 13.08 secs (1993).

== Early life ==
Born in Georgetown, British Guiana, Mark McKoy spent his youth in England before moving to Canada as a teenager. He attended Clemson University in 1980 but dropped out.

== Athletics career ==
McKoy came to the international athletics scene in 1982, winning a gold medal for the 110 metres hurdles and silver for the 4 × 100 metres relay at the Commonwealth Games. The following year, McKoy finished fourth in the 110 metres hurdles at the first World Championships and then repeated this finishing position at the 1984 Summer Olympics in Los Angeles.

In 1986, McKoy repeated his victory in the 110 metres hurdles at the Commonwealth Games and upgraded his 4 × 100 metres relay silver to gold.

At the 1987 World Championships, he finished seventh in the 110 metres hurdles.

McKoy finished seventh in the 110 metres hurdles at the 1988 Summer Olympics in Seoul, hitting a number of hurdles in the final. His compatriot Ben Johnson tested positive for banned substances at the Games. In protest of the rush to judgement and treatment of his friend and teammate, Mark left the Olympic games prior to competing in the 4 × 100 metre relay. This act led to McKoy receiving a 2-year suspension from international athletics from the Canadian Olympic Committee. Over the course of the Dubin Inquiry, McKoy testified that as a young man and under pressure from his coach, Charlie Francis, he briefly experimented with performance enhancing drugs.

McKoy made his comeback at the 1991 World Championships, once again finishing fourth in 110 metres hurdles. At the Olympic Games in Barcelona, McKoy put his fourth-place streak behind him and won the gold medal in 13.12 seconds. It was the first Canadian Olympic gold medal in track and field since Duncan McNaughton's first-place finish in the high jump competition in 1932; at the same time, McKoy became the first black Canadian to win an Olympic gold medal. At the 1993 IAAF World Indoor Championships in Toronto he won the 60 metres hurdles title.

McKoy emigrated to Austria and subsequently obtained Austrian citizenship in 1994. He spent the last years of his career competing for his adopted country and set an Austrian record of 13.14 seconds in the 110 m hurdles.

McKoy was inducted into the Athletics Canada Hall of Fame in 2011 and the Athletics Ontario Hall of Fame within the Class of 2014.

In February 2021, McKoy featured in an Athletics Canada article for Black History Month celebrating the lives and careers of notable Canadian black athletes; also included were Andre De Grasse, Phylicia George, Charmaine Crooks, Harry Jerome, Barbara Howard and Ray Lewis.

=== Media appearances ===
A training partner of Colin Jackson, he appeared with Jackson and Linford Christie in the workout video The S Plan: Get Fit with Christie and Jackson in 1993.

In April 2020, McKoy was interviewed by Christian Bosse for his Train like an Olympian website and YouTube channel.

On 15 February 2023, McKoy delivered an online seminar for Canadian Masters Athletics entitled Show Yourself Some Love.

On 27 February 2023, McKoy was a guest of Andrew Applebaum on his Toronto Legends podcast series.

McKoy features in the 2024 documentary Colin Jackson: Resilience, talking about his athletics rivalry with Jackson and in particular the 1992 Olympic 110m hurdles event where McKoy won gold while Jackson was hindered in the final after picking up an injury during the quarterfinals. Casting his mind back to the final and his surprise not to see Jackson on his left shoulder, McKoy says: "I come off the last hurdle, I run through the line. What the hell happened? Where's Colin? I turn around and I went directly back to find where Colin was." Jackson hit several hurdles, nearly falling at the last, and could only finish seventh of eight competitors in the final.

=== Personal bests ===
Event	Best	Location	Date
60 metres	6.49	Karlsruhe, Germany	6 March 1993
50 metres hurdles	6.25	Kobe, Japan	5 March 1986
60 metres hurdles	7.41	Toronto, Ontario, Canada	14 March 1993
100 metres	10.08	Villeneuve-d'Ascq, France	2 July 1993
110 metres hurdles	13.08	Villeneuve-d'Ascq, France	2 July 1993

== See also ==
- Canadian records in track and field
- Doping cases in athletics

== Bibliography ==
- Mark Mckoy's Gold Medal Fitness Secrets: Raw & Real ISBN 978-1497433960
