= Antti Haapakoski =

Finnish hurdler (born 1971)

Antti Ensio Haapakoski (born February 6, 1971, in Kalajoki) is a retired Finnish hurdler.

He won the gold medal at the 1990 World Junior Championships, finished fifth at the 1992 European Indoor Championships, sixth at the European Championships, and sixth at the 1995 World Indoor Championships.

He also competed at the 1990 European Championships, the World Championships in 1991, 1993, and 1995, the Olympic Games in 1992 and 1996, and the World Indoor Championships in 1993 and 1997 without reaching the final.

He became the Finnish champion in 1990, 1993, 1994, 1995, 1996 and 1997.

His personal best time was 13.42 seconds, achieved in June 1995 in Kuortane.
