= Kai Kyllönen =

Finnish hurdler

Personal information
- Born: 30 January 1965 (age 61) Turku, Finland

Sport
- Sport: Track and field

Kai Kyllönen (born 30 January 1965) is a retired Finnish athlete who specializes in the 110 metres hurdles.

He was born in Turku. He competed at the World Championships in 1991, 1993 and 1995, the 1994 European Championships as well as the World Indoor Championships in 1989 and 1993 without reaching the final round.

He became Finnish champion in 1991, rivalling with Antti Haapakoski. He also became indoor champion in 1994 and 1996, as well as 200 metres outdoor champion in 1989 and 1994.

His personal best time was 13.52 seconds, achieved in August 1994 in Jyväskylä.
