= Greg Foster (hurdler) =

American hurdler (1958–2023)

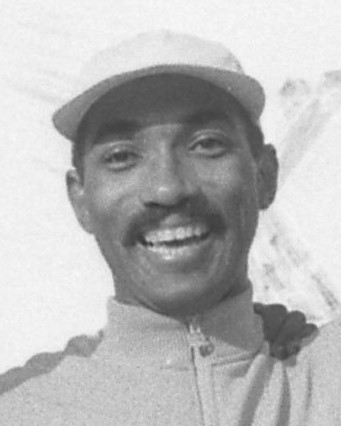
- Foster in 1984

Personal information
- Born: January 4, 1958 Chicago, Illinois
- Died: February 19, 2023 (aged 65) Chicago, Illinois
Medal record
Men's athletics
Representing the United States
Olympic Games
Silver medal – second place	1984 Los Angeles	110 m hurdles
World Championships
Gold medal – first place	1983 Helsinki	110 m hurdles
Gold medal – first place	1987 Rome	110 m hurdles
Gold medal – first place	1991 Tokyo	110 m hurdles
Goodwill Games
Gold medal – first place	1986 Moscow	110 m hurdles
World Indoor Championships
Gold medal – first place	1991 Sevilla	60 m hurdles

Gregory Foster (August 4, 1958 – February 19, 2023) was an American hurdler. He was the first person in the history of the IAAF World Championships in Athletics to win three consecutive 110 meters hurdles titles (1983, 1987, and 1991). Foster was the 1981 IAAF World Cup and the 1991 World Indoor hurdling champion.

As well as his international titles, Foster was twice NCAA outdoor champion (1978 and 1980) in the 110 meters hurdles and was the NCAA 200 meters champion in 1979. He won 10 U.S. national titles, four of them outdoors in the 110 meters hurdles (1981, 1983, 1986, and 1987) and six indoors, in the 60 yard hurdles (1983, 1984, 1985), 55 meters hurdles (1987, 1988) and 60 meters hurdles (1991).

Foster broke the world indoor record for the 50 meters hurdles in 1985 (6.35 seconds) and tied that mark in 1987. He also broke the 60 meters hurdles world indoor record in 1987 with a time of 7.36. He was the American record holder in the 110 meters hurdles with a time of 13.22 seconds set at the 1978 NCAA Championships while competing for UCLA, second at the time only to Cuba's world record holder Alejandro Casañas. Foster's mark held as an NCAA meet record for decades and still stands as a UCLA record as of 2022.

His personal best time for the 110 meters hurdles was 13.03, run at the Weltklasse Zürich meet in 1981 in which Renaldo Nehemiah became the first man the break the 13 second barrier, with his 12.93. This once again made Foster the second-fastest hurdler of all time. He was ranked in the top ten hurdlers in the world for 15 out of 16 years 1977 to 1992. Five of those years, he was ranked number one, 1982, 1983, 1986, 1987 and 1991.

Foster was suspended from athletics for six months in 1990 after testing positive to ephedrine which he said was contained in his asthma medication.

He retired from competition in 1996 and his many achievements saw him inducted into the USATF Hall of Fame in 1998.

== Personal life and death ==
Foster was born in Chicago, Illinois.

From 2015 until January 2020, he suffered from amyloidosis, a rare, life-threatening disease that does considerable damage to the heart. Despite this, he remained involved in the sport, helping the next generation as a coach. On January 18, Foster underwent heart transplant surgery at Barnes Jewish Hospital.

Foster died on February 19, 2023, at the age of 65.

== Track records ==
As of 7 September 2024, Foster holds the following track records for 110 metres hurdles.

Location	Time	Windspeed m/s	Date
Berkeley, California	13.29	+0.1	12/06/1982
A Coruña	13.15	+1.6	26/07/1990
Lappeenranta	13.11	+1.2	09/07/1991
Lemoore, California	13.39	+0.8	08/05/1982
Los Angeles	13.19	+0.5	18/06/1984
Malmö	13.12	–0.5	05/08/1991
Riccione	13.33	+1.2	31/08/1985
San Jose, California	13.15	+3.1	25/06/1987
