= Tony Jarrett =

British athlete (born 1968)

Personal information
- Nationality: British (English)
- Born: 13 August 1968 (age 58) Enfield, England
- Height: 188 cm (6 ft 2 in)
- Weight: 80 kg (176 lb)

Sport
- Sport: Track and field
- Event: 110 metres hurdles
- Club: Haringey AC
Medal record
Men's athletics
Representing Great Britain
World Championships
Silver medal – second place	1993 Stuttgart	110 m hurdles
Silver medal – second place	1993 Stuttgart	4x100 m relay
Silver medal – second place	1995 Gothenburg	110 m hurdles
Bronze medal – third place	1991 Tokyo	110 m hurdles
Bronze medal – third place	1991 Tokyo	4x100 m relay
World Indoor Championships
Bronze medal – third place	1995 Barcelona	60 m hurdles
European Championships
Silver medal – second place	1990 Split	110 m hurdles
Bronze medal – third place	1994 Helsinki	110 m hurdles
Representing England
Commonwealth Games
Gold medal – first place	1990 Auckland	4x100m relay
Gold medal – first place	1998 Kuala Lumpur	110 m hurdles
Silver medal – second place	1990 Auckland	110 m hurdles
Silver medal – second place	1994 Victoria	110 m hurdles

Anthony Alexander Jarrett (born 13 August 1968) is a male former sprint and hurdling athlete from England. He competed at four Olympic Games.

== Biography ==
He was a silver medalist in the 110 metres hurdles at the World Championships in 1993 and 1995, and at the European Championships in 1990, and won the gold medal in the event at the Commonwealth Games in 1990 and 1998.

Jarrett came fourth in the 110m hurdles at the 1992 Summer Olympics in Barcelona, missing out on a bronze medal by 1000th of a second to Jack Pierce of the United States. He again narrowly missed out on an Olympic medal when he was a member of the 4 × 100 m sprint relay team that also finished 4th in the Olympic final of that year. Four years earlier in 1988 he finished in 6th place in the 110m hurdles at the 1988 Summer Olympics in Seoul.

He represented England and won a gold medal as part of the 4 x 100 metres relay team and a silver medal in the 110 metres hurdles, at the 1990 Commonwealth Games in Auckland, New Zealand. Four years later he represented England and won another silver medal, at the 1994 Commonwealth Games in Victoria, Canada. He represented England for a third Games and won a gold medal, at the 1998 Commonwealth Games in Kuala Lumpur, Malaysia. He also made a fourth appearance during the 2002 Manchester Commonwealth Games.

Jarrett's career was overshadowed by the achievements of fellow Briton Colin Jackson, who beat him into second place on numerous occasions at major competitions such as the World Championships, Commonwealth Games (twice), European Championships and Goodwill Games. Jackson also defeated Jarrett eight times at the national championships. In all Jarrett won two individual world silver medals and one individual bronze medal in the 110m hurdles, and another silver and bronze medal in the 4 × 100 m sprint relay.

Jarrett was a four-times British 110 metres hurdles champion after winning the British AAA Championships title at the 2001 AAA Championships the UK Athletics Championships in 1987, 1988 and 1997.

Jarrett was disqualified for false starts at both the 2000 Summer Olympics in Sydney, in the first round, and in the semi-finals of the 2001 World Championships, events from which he appeared never to recover.

Jarrett's personal best time for the 110m hurdles is 13.00 seconds, set when he finished as runner-up to Jackson at the 1993 World Championships.

== Other Achievements ==
- 1987 European Athletics Junior Championships
  - Gold medal
- 1994 Goodwill Games
  - Silver medal
- 1994 IAAF World Cup
  - Gold medal
- 1999 European Cup
  - Silver medal

=== Track records ===
As of 7 September 2024, Jarrett holds the following track records for 110 metres hurdles.

Location	Time	Windspeed m/s	Date
(France) Dijon	13.37	+ 0.6	13/06/1992
(Malaysia) Kuala Lumpur	13.32	– 0.2	19/09/1998
(Cyprus) Larnaca	13.33	+ 0.5	17/07/1991
(Slovenia) Ljubljana	13.27	+ 1.0	26/05/1996
