= Mircea Oaidă =

Romanian hurdler

Personal information
- Nationality: Romanian
- Born: 20 February 1969 (age 57)

Sport
- Sport: Track and field
- Event: 110 metres hurdles

Mircea Oaidă (born 20 February 1969) is a Romanian hurdler. He competed in the men's 110 metres hurdles at the 1992 Summer Olympics.
