= Toshihiko Iwasaki =

Japanese hurdler

Medal record

Men's athletics

Representing Japan

Asian Championships
Bronze medal – third place	1991 Kuala Lumpur	110 m hurdles

Toshihiko Iwasaki (岩崎 利彦, Iwasaki Toshihiko) (born October 14, 1967) is a retired Japanese male hurdler. He competed for Japan at the 1992 Summer Olympics, where he was eliminated in the first heat of the quarterfinals.

== International competitions ==
Representing Japan
Year	Competition	Venue	Position	Event	Notes
1990	Asian Games	Beijing, PR China	2nd	110 m	
1991	Asian Championships	Kuala Lumpur, Malaysia	3rd	110 m	
