= Laurent Ottoz =

Italian hurdler

Personal information
- Nationality: Italian
- Born: 10 April 1970 (age 56) Brescia, Italy
- Height: 1.78 m (5 ft 10 in)
- Weight: 64 kg (141 lb)

Sport
- Country: Italy
- Sport: Athletics
- Events: 110 metres hurdles 400 metres hurdles
- Club: G.S. Fiamme Gialle
- Coached by: Eddy Ottoz

Achievements and titles
- Personal bests: 110 m hs: 13.42 (1994); 400 m hs: 48.52 (1993); 60 m hs: 7.62 (1993)
Medal record
Mediterranean Games
Silver medal – second place	1997 Bari	400 m hurdles
Silver medal – second place	2001 Tunis	400 m hurdles
Bronze medal – third place	2005 Almeira	400 m hurdles
Military World Games
Bronze medal – third place	1995 Rome	400 m hurdles

Laurent Ottoz (born 10 April 1970) is an Italian hurdler. He won four medals, at senior level, at international athletics competitions.

== Career ==
His personal best time was 13.42 seconds, achieved in August 1994 in Berlin. This is a former Italian record, which in turn belonged to his father Eddy Ottoz with 13.46 seconds. The Italian record currently belongs to Emanuele Abate with 13.28 seconds.

After this he changed event to the 400 metres hurdles. His personal best time is 48.52 seconds, and in Italy only Fabrizio Mori and Alessandro Sibilio has run the distance faster.

In 1995, Laurent set the fastest automatically recorded time for the rarely run 200 metres low hurdles at 22.55. While inferior to the last official world record in the race, a hand timed 21.9 by Don Styron in 1960, Ottoz bettered the previous best automatic time 22.63 held by Colin Jackson, arguably the best hurdler in the world at that time. On 16 May 2010 the English hurdler Andy Turner set 22.30, but his record was never recognized by International federation, because was obtained in a straight race. Ottoz ran his race around a bend. IAAF still recognizes Styron as a hand timed record, Turner as the automatically timed record, both for a straight race, and Ottoz as the record holder for around a bend.

== World best performance ==
- 200 metres hurdles (bend): 22.55 (Milan, 31 May 1995) - current holder

== National records ==
In 1994 he set a new Italian record of 110 m hs, snatching it from his father Eddy who had held it for 26 years.

- 110 metres hurdles: 13.42 ( (Germany) Berlin, 30 August 1994), till 23 June 2002.
- 400 metres hurdles: 48.53 ( (Switzerland) Lausanne, 5 July 1995), till 26 May 1996.

== Achievements ==
Year	Competition	Venue	Position	Event	Notes
Representing Italy
1990	European Championships	Split, Yugoslavia	14th (sf)	110 m hurdles	13.97 (wind: 0.0 m/s)
1992	European Indoor Championships	Genoa, Italy	6th	60 m hurdles	7.80
1994	European Championships	Helsinki, Finland	9th (sf)	110 m hurdles	13.53 (wind: +0.1 m/s)
1997	Mediterranean Games	Bari, Italy	2nd	400 m hurdles	49.27
1998	European Championships	Budapest, Hungary	6th	400 m hurdles	49.15
2001	Mediterranean Games	Tunis, Tunisia	3rd	400 m hurdles	50.75
2005	Mediterranean Games	Almería, Spain	2nd	400 m hurdles	49.41
2006	European Championships	Gothenburg, Sweden	18th	400 m hurdles	51.22

== National titles ==
Ottoz won thirteen individual national championships.

- 4 wins in the 110 metres hurdles (1990, 1991, 1992, 1994)
- 6 wins in the 400 metres hurdles (1995, 1997, 1998, 1999, 2001, 2002)
- 3 wins in the 60 metres hurdles indoor (1991, 1993, 1994)

== See also ==
- Italian all-time lists - 110 metres hurdles
- Italian all-time lists - 400 metres hurdles
- List of world records in athletics
- Ottoz family
