= Dietmar Koszewski =

German hurdler

Personal information
- Born: 26 July 1967 (age 59) West Berlin, West Germany

Sport
- Sport: Track and field
Medal record
Representing West Germany
European Championships
Bronze medal – third place	1990 Split	110 m hurdles
Representing Germany
Summer Universiade
Gold medal – first place	1993 Buffalo	110 m hurdles

Dietmar Koszewski (born 26 July 1967) is a retired German hurdler.

He won a bronze medal for West Germany at the 1990 European Championships in Athletics in Split and the gold medal at the 1993 Summer Universiade in Buffalo.

His personal best was 13.41 seconds, achieved in July 1990 in Hamburg. This ranks him ninth among German 110 m hurdlers, behind Florian Schwarthoff, Mike Fenner, Eric Kaiser, Falk Balzer, Thomas Blaschek, Sven Göhler, Thomas Munkelt and Holger Pohland.
