= 1992 European Athletics Indoor Championships =

- Dates: 28 February–1 March
- Host city: Genoa; Italy
- Venue: Palasport di Genova
- Events: 27
- Participation: 439 athletes from 35 nations

The 1992 European Athletics Indoor Championships were held in 1992 in Genoa, Italy. This was the first edition to be held biannually and not annually and also the first to be held over three days as opposed to two. It also marked the debut of the combined events at the championships.

== Medal summary ==
=== Men ===
Event	Gold		Silver		Bronze	
60 metres	Jason Livingston (GBR)	6.53	Vitaliy Savin (EUN)	6.54	Michael Rosswess (GBR)	6.62
200 metres	Nikolay Antonov (BUL)	20.41 NR	Daniel Sangouma (FRA)	20.64	Aleksandr Goremykin (EUN)	21.09
400 metres	Slobodan Branković (YUG)	46.33	Andrea Nuti (ITA)	46.37	David Grindley (GBR)	46.60
800 metres	Luis Javier González (ESP)	1:46.80	José Arconada (ESP)	1:47.16	Tonino Viali (ITA)	1:47.22
1500 metres	Matthew Yates (GBR)	3:42.32	Sergey Melnikov (EUN)	3:42.44	Branko Zorko (CRO)	3:42.85
3000 metres	Gennaro Di Napoli (ITA)	7:47.24	John Mayock (GBR)	7:48.47	José Luis González (ESP)	7:48.92
60 metres hurdles	Igors Kazanovs (LAT)	7.55	Tomasz Nagórka (POL)	7.69	Jiří Hudec (TCH)	7.72
5000 metres walk	Giovanni De Benedictis (ITA)	18:19.97 NR	Frants Kostyukevich (EUN)	18:25.40	Stefan Johansson (SWE)	18:27.95 NR
High jump	Patrik Sjöberg (SWE)	2.38	Sorin Matei (ROM)	2.36	Ralf Sonn (GER); Dragutin Topić (YUG)	2.29
Pole vault	Pyotr Bochkaryov (EUN)	5.85	István Bagyula (HUN)	5.80	Konstantin Semyonov (EUN)	5.60
Long jump	Dmitriy Bagryanov (EUN)	8.12	Konstantin Krause (GER)	8.04	Jarmo Kärnä (FIN)	7.96
Triple jump	Leonid Voloshin (EUN)	17.35	Serge Hélan (FRA)	17.18	Vasiliy Sokov (EUN)	17.01
Shot put	Aleksandr Bagach (EUN)	20.75	Aleksandr Klimenko (EUN)	20.02	Klaus Bodenmüller (AUT)	19.99
Heptathlon	Christian Plaziat (FRA)	6418 WR	Robert Změlík (TCH)	6118	Antonio Peñalver (ESP)	6062

=== Women ===
Event	Gold		Silver		Bronze	
60 metres	Zhanna Tarnopolskaya (EUN)	7.17	Anelia Nuneva (BUL)	7.29	Nadezhda Roshchupkina (EUN)	7.31
200 metres	Oksana Stepicheva (EUN)	23.18	Iolanda Oanta (ROM)	23.23	Sabine Tröger (AUT)	23.35
400 metres	Sandra Myers (ESP)	51.21	Olga Bryzgina (EUN)	51.48	Yelena Golesheva (EUN)	52.07
800 metres	Ella Kovacs (ROM)	1:59.98	Inna Yevseyeva (EUN)	2:00.26	Yelena Afanasyeva (EUN)	2:00.69
1500 metres	Yekaterina Podkopayeva (EUN)	4:06.61	Lyubov Kremlyova (EUN)	4:06.62	Doina Melinte (ROM)	4:06.90
3000 metres	Margareta Keszeg (ROM)	8:59.80	Tatyana Dorovskikh (EUN)	9:00.15	Rita Marquard (GER)	9:00.99
60 metres hurdles	Lyudmila Narozhilenko (EUN)	7.82	Monique Ewanjé-Épée (FRA)	7.99	Yordanka Donkova (BUL)	8.03
3000 metres walk	Alina Ivanova (EUN)	11:49.99	Ileana Salvador (ITA)	11:53.23 NR	Beate Anders (GER)	11:55.41
High jump	Heike Henkel (GER)	2.02	Stefka Kostadinova (BUL)	2.02	Yelena Yelesina (EUN)	1.94
Long jump	Larysa Berezhna (EUN)	7.00	Marieta Ilcu (ROM)	6.74	Ljudmila Ninova (AUT)	6.60
Triple jump	Inessa Kravets (EUN)	14.15	Sofiya Bozhanova (BUL)	13.98	Helga Radtke (GER)	13.75
Shot put	Natalya Lisovskaya (EUN)	20.70	Svetla Mitkova (BUL)	20.06	Astrid Kumbernuss (GER)	19.37
Pentathlon	Liliana Nastase (ROM)	4701	Petra Vaideanu (ROM)	4677	Urszula Włodarczyk (POL)	4651

== Medal table ==
Rank	Nation	Gold	Silver	Bronze	Total
1	Unified Team at the Olympics (EUN)	12	8	7	27
2	Romania (ROM)	3	4	1	8
3	Italy (ITA)	2	2	1	5
4	Great Britain (GBR)	2	1	2	5
4	Spain (ESP)	2	1	2	5
6	Bulgaria (BUL)	1	4	1	6
7	France (FRA)	1	3	1	5
8	Germany (GER)	1	1	4	6
9	Sweden (SWE)	1	0	1	2
9	Yugoslavia (YUG)	1	0	1	2
11	Latvia (LAT)	1	0	0	1
12	Czechoslovakia (TCH)	0	1	1	2
12	Poland (POL)	0	1	1	2
14	Hungary (HUN)	0	1	0	1
15	Austria (AUT)	0	0	3	3
16	Croatia (CRO)	0	0	1	1
16	Finland (FIN)	0	0	1	1
Totals (17 entries)		27	27	28	82

== Participating nations ==
- Albania (1)
- Andorra (4)
- Austria (11)
- Belgium (5)
- Bulgaria (17)
- Croatia (3)
- Cyprus (2)
- Czechoslovakia (18)
- Denmark (2)
- Estonia (1)
- Finland (9)
- France (30)
- Germany (44)
- Great Britain (30)
- Greece (9)
- Hungary (9)
- Iceland (1)
- Ireland (5)
- Israel (2)
- Italy (49)
- Latvia (9)
- Lithuania (7)
- Netherlands (10)
- Norway (9)
- Poland (12)
- Portugal (10)
- Romania (16)
- San Marino (3)
- Slovenia (3)
- Spain (25)
- Sweden (12)
- Switzerland (16)
- Turkey (6)
- Unified Team (43)
- Yugoslavia (6)

== See also ==
- 1992 in athletics (track and field)
