= 1989 European Athletics Indoor Championships =

- Dates: 18–19 February
- Host city: The Hague; Netherlands
- Venue: Houtrust
- Events: 24
- Participation: 330 athletes from 27 nations

The 1989 European Athletics Indoor Championships were held at Houtrust in The Hague, Netherlands, on 18 and 19 February 1989.

== Medal summary ==
=== Men ===
Event	Gold		Silver		Bronze	
60 metres	Andreas Berger (AUT)	6.56	Matthias Schlicht (FRG)	6.58	Michael Rosswess (GBR)	6.59
200 metres	Ade Mafe (GBR)	20.92	John Regis (GBR)	21.00	Bruno Marie-Rose (FRA)	21.14
400 metres	Cayetano Cornet (ESP)	46.21	Brian Whittle (GBR)	46.49	Klaus Just (FRG)	46.80
800 metres	Steve Heard (GBR)	1:48.84	Rob Druppers (NED)	1:48.96	Joachim Heydgen (GDR)	1:49.75
1500 metres	Hervé Phélippeau (FRA)	3:47.42	Han Kulker (NED)	3:47.57	Sergey Afanasyev (URS)	3:47.63
3000 metres	Dieter Baumann (FRG)	7:50.43	Abel Antón (ESP)	7:51.88	Jacky Carlier (FRA)	7:52.23
60 metres hurdles	Colin Jackson (GBR)	7.59	Holger Pohland (GDR)	7.65	Philippe Tourret (FRA)	7.67
5000 metres walk	Mikhail Shchennikov (URS)	18:35.60	Roman Mrázek (TCH)	18:40.11	Giovanni De Benedictis (ITA)	18:43.45
High jump	Dietmar Mögenburg (FRG)	2.33	Dalton Grant (GBR)	2.33	Aleksey Yemelin (URS)	2.30
Pole vault	Grigoriy Yegorov (URS)	5.75	Igor Potapovich (URS)	5.75	Mirosław Chmara (POL)	5.70
Long jump	Emiel Mellaard (NED)	8.14	Antonio Corgos (ESP)	8.12	Frans Maas (NED)	8.11
Triple jump	Nikolay Musiyenko (URS)	17.29	Volker Mai (GDR)	17.03	Milan Mikuláš (TCH)	16.84
Shot put	Ulf Timmermann (GDR)	21.68	Karsten Stolz (FRG)	20.22	Georg Andersen (NOR)	20.22

=== Women ===
Event	Gold		Silver		Bronze	
60 metres	Nelli Fiere-Cooman (NED)	7.15	Laurence Bily (FRA)	7.19	Sisko Hanhijoki (FIN)	7.23
200 metres	Marie-José Pérec (FRA)	23.21	Regula Aebi (SUI)	23.38	Sabine Tröger (AUT)	23.70
400 metres	Sally Gunnell (GBR)	52.04	Marina Shmonina (URS)	52.36	Anita Protti (SUI)	52.57
800 metres	Doina Melinte (ROM)	1:59.89	Ellen Kiessling (GDR)	2:01.24	Tatyana Grebenchuk (URS)	2:01.63
1500 metres	Paula Ivan (ROM)	4:07.16	Marina Yachmenyova (URS)	4:07.77	Svetlana Kitova (URS)	4:08.36
3000 metres	Elly van Hulst (NED)	9:10.01	Nicky Morris (GBR)	9:12.37	Maricica Puică (ROM)	9:15.49
60 metres hurdles	Yordanka Donkova (BUL)	7.87	Lyudmila Narozhilenko (URS)	7.94	Gabi Lippe (FRG)	7.96
3000 metres walk	Beate Anders (GDR)	12:21.91	Ileana Salvador (ITA)	12:32.43	María Reyes Sobrino (ESP)	12:39.50
High jump	Galina Astafei (ROM)	1.96	Hanne Haugland (NOR)	1.96	Maryse Ewanjé-Epée (FRA)	1.91
Long jump	Galina Chistyakova (URS)	6.98	Yolanda Chen (URS)	6.86	Ringa Ropo-Junnila (FIN)	6.62
Shot put	Stephanie Storp (FRG)	20.30	Heike Hartwig (GDR)	20.03	Iris Plotzitzka (FRG)	19.79

== Medal table ==
Rank	Nation	Gold	Silver	Bronze	Total
1	Soviet Union (URS)	4	5	4	13
2	Great Britain (GBR)	4	4	1	9
3	West Germany (FRG)	3	2	3	8
4	Netherlands (NED)	3	2	1	6
5	Romania (ROU)	3	0	1	4
6	East Germany (GDR)	2	4	1	7
7	France (FRA)	2	1	4	7
8	Spain (ESP)	1	2	1	4
9	Austria (AUT)	1	0	1	2
10	Bulgaria (BUL)	1	0	0	1
11	Czechoslovakia (TCH)	0	1	1	2
11	Italy (ITA)	0	1	1	2
11	Norway (NOR)	0	1	1	2
11	Switzerland (SUI)	0	1	1	2
15	Finland (FIN)	0	0	2	2
16	Poland (POL)	0	0	1	1
Totals (16 entries)		24	24	24	72

== Participating nations ==
- Austria (8)
- Belgium (13)
- Bulgaria (11)
- Cyprus (4)
- Czechoslovakia (15)
- Denmark (3)
- East Germany (9)
- Finland (12)
- France (26)
- Great Britain (30)
- Greece (7)
- Hungary (17)
- Iceland (1)
- Ireland (5)
- Italy (20)
- Netherlands (19)
- Norway (11)
- Poland (10)
- Portugal (7)
- Romania (5)
- Soviet Union (26)
- Spain (24)
- Sweden (7)
- Switzerland (6)
- Turkey (2)
- West Germany (28)
- Yugoslavia (4)

== See also ==
- 1989 in athletics (track and field)
