= Go Dad Run =

Go Dad Run is a charitable project that was created in 2013 by former world champion athlete Colin Jackson in order to raise awareness about men's health issues, especially prostate cancer and funds for male health charities including Prostate Cancer UK. It is a series of runs for men and boys that take place around the UK in June. They can run, walk, wheel or jog around the courses and raise money for the charity via sponsorship.

Jackson founded it after two of his uncles developed prostate cancer and although one responded to treatment the other was less fortunate and died. That prompted him to find out more information about the illness and he was shocked to discover that whilst 1 in 8 men in the UK will develop prostate cancer, that rises to 1 in 4 men from an African Caribbean background.

== History ==
=== 2013 ===
The first ever Go Dad Run 5K for men and boys aged 16+ took place in Llangefni, Anglesey on Father’s Day, 16 June 2013. The event started and finished at the Ysgol Gyfun school in the town and was organised by Menter Môn, the local enterprise agency. Colin Jackson, Mark Foster, Jamie Baulch and Siân Lloyd were all there to lend support as more than 150 men and boys pulled on their yellow Y fronts and took part in the run around the town.

=== 2014 ===
In 2014 Go Dad Run welcomed a new headline sponsor as the Sanlam Go Dad Run expanded and staged three small events on Father’s Day weekend (14-15 June) in Crystal Palace Park in London, Bute Park in Cardiff and Cannon Hill Park in Birmingham. Boys aged 14+ joined their dads and the men on the courses.

Mark Foster and Siân Lloyd handed out the medals to the runners as they crossed the finish line in London. Colin Jackson, Jamie Baulch, Christian Malcolm and Suzanne Packer were their ambassadors in Cardiff and Colin also attended the Birmingham event where Derek Redmond joined him to fire the starting gun.

=== 2015 ===
In 2015 Go Dad Run expanded to six events, changed the runner Y fronts from yellow to blue and reduced the age limit to 11+. Their main launch event was attended by Elizabeth Emanuel, Fernando Montano, and David Seaman alongside their ambassadors.

Mark Foster set the runners on their way in Southwark Park, London and Greville Smyth Park, Bristol and Colin Jackson went to Llangefni to greet the men and boys before they ran around the town. At Worcester Racecourse he was joined by two other world champions, Derek Redmond and Donovan Bailey, and Colin's actress sister Suzanne Packer was on hand in Victoria Park Warrington to start the event and present the medals.

Their biggest run took place in Bute Park Cardiff where ambassadors Siân Lloyd and Jamie Baulch were joined by Welsh rugby legends Martyn Williams and Tom Shanklin.

=== 2016 ===
Six events were staged in June 2016 in London, Cardiff, Bristol, Sunderland, Worcester and the Isle of Man.

A number of rule changes were introduced and there were 10K events at all locations, the 5K runs were opened to men and boys of any age and all aged 10+ were to be chip timed.

The 2016 events were launched at the Grange, St Paul's Hotel in London when a number of prostate cancer survivors spoke, including Errol McKellar and Alfred Samuels, Sian Lloyd introduced the special Olympic Q&A with Colin Jackson, Daley Thompson, Leon Taylor and Jamie Baulch.

=== 2017 ===
In 2017 Go Dad Run changed its format and the runs will be staged in a different cities each month between April and October. The series will begin in Sunderland on 2 April and then move to London, Brighton & Hove, Worcester, Cardiff, Norwich and Bristol. The Lead Charity is Prostate Cancer UK and the three new National Charity Partners are Bowel Cancer UK, Orchid and Campaign Against Living Miserably (CALM). Each run also has a local care based or hospice charity partner.
