= Tony Singh =

Scottish celebrity chef and restaurateur (born 1971)

Tony Singh, MBE
- Born: Rajinder Tony Singh; 15 May 1971 (age 55); Leith, Edinburgh, Scotland
- Education: Telford College
- Children: 4
- Culinary career
- Cooking style: Scottish / French / British / Indian
- Website: tonysingh.co.uk

Rajinder Tony Singh Kusbia MBE (born 15 May 1971) is a Scottish celebrity chef and restaurateur. He is best known for combining Scottish produce with an arty, eclectic and accessible style of cooking.

Born and raised in Leith, Edinburgh, Singh comes from a second-generation Scottish Sikh family. He studied at Telford College and completed a Youth Training Scheme in Professional Cookery before beginning his career in the restaurant industry. The year he completed his formal training, Singh started working in fine dining restaurants in Britain, including the Balmoral Hotel in 1990, Gravetye Manor in 1992, and The Royal Scotsman train in 1994. Afterwards Singh worked in the Greywalls Hotel, aboard the Royal Yacht Britannia, and at Skibo Castle, before opening his own restaurant in 2001.

His menus have featured seasonal and local Scottish ingredients with influences and additions from around the world. He holds the title of Master Chef of Great Britain, is a member of the Academy of Culinary Arts and Craft Guild of Chefs, and was honoured by the Queen in her 2017 New Year Honours List being made a Member of the Order of the British Empire for his services to the Food and Drink Industry.

== Early life ==
Singh was born in Leith to a second-generation Scottish Sikh family. While he was growing up, his father, Baldev Singh Kusbia, became one of the first Sikh lorry drivers in Scotland, while Singh's mother looked after their family home. As a youngster, Singh shared his home not only with his three siblings (two brothers and one sister) but with his aunts, uncles, grandmother and great grandmother.

Singh was educated at Lorne Street Primary, then Leith Academy Secondary School, before moving on to Telford College at 16 where he earned an OND in Hotel Management. During his time at college, Singh also enrolled himself in a Youth Training Scheme where he earned an equivalent to City and Guilds 7061 and 7062 qualifications in Professional Cookery.

== Career ==
After training at Telford College, he worked in restaurants in Britain, including the Balmoral Hotel, Gravetye Manor, The Royal Scotsman train, Greywalls Hotel, the Royal Yacht Britannia, and Skibo Castle.

In 2001 Singh became the Chef Patron at "Oloroso", a rooftop bar and restaurant on Castle Street, Edinburgh.

Singh was the former owner of "Roti" in 2005, an Indian restaurant in Scotland, which he had for four years before selling it. Then, in 2009, Singh opened "Tony's Table", a modern style bistro, also in Edinburgh, which received a Michelin Bib Gourmand in 2010.

After appearing in the TV show The Incredible Spice Men with chef Cyrus Todiwala, he and Todiwala published a recipe book in 2013, and, in 2014, Singh released his own solo book Tasty.

In 2015, Singh ran a pop-up restaurant for the Edinburgh Festival at the Apex Grassmarket Hotel which served a range of foods, including haggis pakora.

Singh works with schools and colleges throughout Scotland for staff development and training.

Singh became a resident feature at the Apex Grassmarket Hotel with his "Tony Singh's Roadtrip", while also opening another pop-up restaurant under its own name in Glasgow, based in the Alea Casino.

== Awards and honours ==
Singh is known for his contemporary Scottish cooking, which combines his love of local Scottish produce with influences and additions from around the world. He is a member of the Royal Academy of Culinary Arts, the Master Chefs of Great Britain, and the Craft Guild of Chefs. He has also received several awards including the Drambuie Chefs Association Best New Restaurant of the Year, Scottish Chefs Award Scottish Chef of the Year and SLTN Best Restaurant catering in Scotland Chef of the Year. In December 2016, he was made a Member of the Order of the British Empire (MBE) by the Queen for his services to the Food and Drink Industry.

== Charity work ==
Singh has supported and worked closely with the charities Sick Kids Edinburgh, Macmillan Cancer Support, the Scottish Blood Transfusion Service, Food Train, Scotland's Charity Air Ambulance, Water Aid, St. Columbus Hospice, and the Back-Up Trust. In 2015, he was a presenter on RBS – Finding Scotland's Real Heroes, where he visited and spoke about the eventual winners of the Carer of the Year award, East Kilbride & District Dementia Carers Group.

== Television ==
Singh first appeared on TV as a competitor in ITV's Chef of the Year in 2000, which he also won. He was also featured on Ready Steady Cook with James Martin in June 2008. Afterwards, he appeared in Series 3 of the BBC's Great British Menu which then lead to his reappearance in Series 5, 6 and 8.

In 2013, Singh partnered with Cyrus Todiwala to present their own cookery show on BBC Two called The Incredible Spice Men.

Singh was later featured in food and personality shows around the UK, including The One Show, The Paul O'Grady Show, Countryfile and Celebrity Mastermind as well as appearing on Radio Scotland, Radio 1, Radio 4 and BBC Radio Asia. In 2015 Singh and Todiwala paired up again and appeared on the Celebrity edition of the quiz show Pointless.

In the same year, Singh then starred as one of the chefs on BBC Two's A Cook Abroad. In that, Singh went to India during Diwali, where he presented traditional food in the Punjab and explored his Indian heritage.

In September 2018, he appeared on the CBBC documentary Our School (TV series) as a guest head judge for the bake-off.

In 2021, Singh appeared as a special guest on the show ‘Men in Kilts: A Road Trip with Sam and Graham’, starring Sam Heughan and Graham McTavish from the show Outlander. On ‘Men in Kilts’, Singh prepared a seafood dish for Sam and Graham, with his unique signature fusion of Scottish and Asian flavours.

In 2022, he was on Series 2 of Cooking with the Stars.

== Books ==
- The Incredible Spice Men. London: BBC Books. 2013. ISBN 978-1-84990-706-4. (with Cyrus Todiwala)
- Tasty. London: Headline. 2014. ISBN 978-1-47221-908-4.
