= Marine Conservation Society =

Marine environment, not-for-profit organisation based in UK

- Founded: 1983
- Type: Charitable organisation
- Registration no.: 1004005 (England & Wales); SC037480 (Scotland)
- Purpose: Marine protected areas, sustainable seafood, beach and marine litter, cleaner bathing waters
- Location: Ross-on-Wye, England, UK
- Region served: United Kingdom
- Key people: Sandy Luk (CEO)
- Revenue: £5.2million (2019)
- Website: www.mcsuk.org

The Marine Conservation Society is a charitable organisation working with businesses, governments and communities to clean and protect oceans based in Ross-on-Wye, England. Founded in 1978 as the Underwater Conservation Society, the group claims to be working towards "cleaner, better-protected, healthier UK seas where nature flourishes and people thrive." The charity also works in UK Overseas Territories.

== Efforts ==
The Clean Seas team works to reduce pollution on beaches and in oceans by encouraging change within the public, industry, and government. Reducing reliance on single-use plastics is one of their focal points, with a focus on the impact of PFAS or 'forever chemicals'.

The Fisheries and Aquaculture team encourages sustainable fishing methods. They work to stop overfishing and replace stock. Additionally, they promote the eating of sustainable seafood via the Good Fish Guide.

The Ocean Recovery works as a team with management authorities and local communities to manage marine protection projects and to protect oceans.

The Marine Conservation Society is a membership organization and relies on income from members, individual donations and corporate support. The charity is sometimes known by its initials MCS.

== Campaigns ==
Beachwatch - the largest volunteer beach cleaning and litter survey in the UK has been running for over 25 years, involving almost 20,000 volunteer beach cleaners annually. The Great British Beach Clean is a national event which takes place every third weekend in September.

Stop Ocean Threads, which addresses clothing fiber pollution.

Don't bottle it Boris worked towards introducing a bottle return program within the UK.

Good Fish Guide - the guide (online, smartphone app and pocket paper version) includes the Marine Conservation Society "Fish to Eat" and "Fish to Avoid" lists and advice on choosing fish to eat from populations that aren't endangered or caught by means which may be considered habitat wrecking.

== Timeline ==
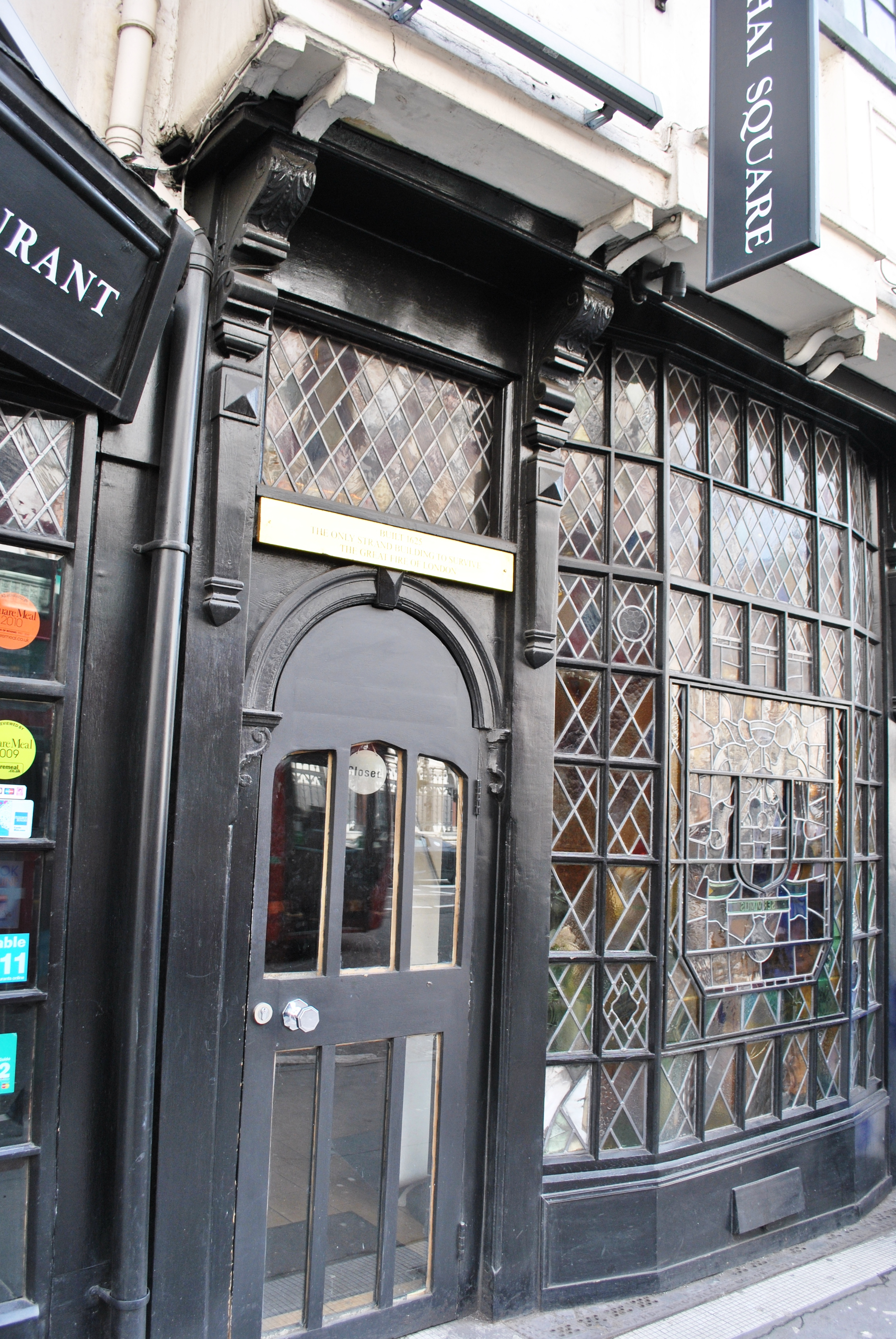
Wig and Pen Club in Fleet Street

- 1975 – Bernard Eaton (editor of Diver magazine) proposes an "Underwater Conservation Year" with the help of such key figures as David Bellamy. The first meeting is held in the Wig and Pen Club in Fleet Street.
- 1977 – The first "Conservation Year" with the Prince of Wales as president. Hundreds of divers survey marine habitats.
- 1978 – The "Underwater Conservation Society" is established in Ross-on-Wye on the success of the "Conservation Year". Bob Earll is named the new UCS Project coordinator.
- 1983 – Name changed to "Marine Conservation Society" and registered with the Charity Commission.
- 1986 – MCS start "Seasearch" with the Joint Nature Conservation Committee.
- 1987 – The "Golden List of Clean Beaches" (now known as the "Good Beach Guide") is published.
- 1988 – The Ross-on-Wye office burns down.
- 1993 – First "Beachwatch" weekend takes place.
- 1998 – MCS wins protection for basking sharks.
- 1999 – MCS starts lobbying for a review of marine nature conservation in UK.
- 1999 – MCS members magazine is first printed in color.
- 2000 – An office is opened in Scotland.
- 2001 – An "Adopt-a-Turtle" scheme is launched.
- 2007 – MCS staff and supporters march on Parliament calling for a strong Marine Bill.
- 2008 – MCS celebrates Silver Jubilee.
- 2009 – The Marine and Coastal Access Act is passed.
- 2009 – "Your Seas Your Voice" Campaign launches.
- 2010 – The Scottish Marine Act is passed.
- 2011 – MCS' sustainable seafood advice is the cornerstone of Channel 4 Big Fish Fight series led by Hugh Fearnley-Whittingstall.
- 2012 – "Sea Champions", a national programme offering environmental volunteer opportunities in the UK, is launched.
- 2013 – MCS leads 2,000 people in a march on Parliament to demand Marine Conservation Zones.
- 2016 - 23 additional Marine Conservation Zones are designated in English waters, bringing the total number to 50.
- 2017 - Seasearch divers document damage in outer Loch Carron, which becomes an emergency Marine Protected Area.
- 2018 - "#StopthePlasticTide" campaign launches on billboards across the country.
- 2018 - MCS expresses concern over deaths of the creatures at Sea Life centres.
- 2019 - Sustainability of over 760 million seafood meals improves thanks to use of the "Good Fish Guide".
- 2020 - Work begins on ground-breaking turtle management work in the British Virgin Islands and Montserrat.

=== Celebrity support ===
- Doug Allan
- Ben Garrod
- Miranda Krestovnikoff
- Chris Packham
- Simon Reeve
- Deborah Meaden
- Iolo Williams
- Zoe Lyons
- Fernando Montano
- Cyrus Todiwala
- Suzie Rodgers

== Awards ==
The Marine Conservation Society won the Coast Magazine "Best Green Marine Campaign Award" in 2011 for its "Beachwatch" project.

The charity's "Great British Beach Clean" project won the BBC Countryfile magazine "Award for the Conservation Success of the Year" in 2018.
