= Fernando Montaño =

Colombian dancer (born 1985)

Fernando Rodríguez Montaño (born 6 March 1985) is a Colombian-British multidisciplinary artist, dancer who performs internationally having previously been a soloist with the Royal Ballet, based at the Royal Opera House in Covent Garden, London until December 2020. On November 19, 2015, he made his debut in a principal role when he performed 'the lover' in The Two Pigeons.

He is the first Colombian to dance with the company having joined them in 2006. Fernando has performed in many different countries including Mexico, Russia, Japan, China, Jamaica, Spain, Italy and US, works regularly with the British fashion designer Dame Vivienne Westwood, and produces and choreographs his own shows around the world. He was described by BBC TV in 2013 as 'the Colombian Billy Elliot'.

In 2016, Fernando took a sabbatical and returned to Colombia to visit his family and be a judge on 52 episodes of the first ever Colombian series of Dancing with the Stars, known locally as Bailando con las Estrellas.

He was also the subject of a BBC documentary, 'Dancing for Peace', that was broadcast in the United Kingdom and around the world in 2016. On September 10, 2016, Montaño premiered 'Foot-Ba', his new fusion of dance and football, at the globally televised opening ceremony of the 2016 FIFA Futsal World Cup in Cali.

== Early life ==
Montaño was born in Buenaventura on the Pacific coast of Colombia into a very poor area of the country. However, at the age of 14, he won a scholarship to the National Ballet School of Cuba where he won several prizes at the International Ballet Contest in Havana, Cuba, and then joined the Cuban National Ballet. He also trained at La Scala and Teatro Nuovo di Torino, Italy where he was spotted by the Director of the English Ballet School, Jane Hucker and Niurka de Saa and invited to the UK to audition, following which he joined the Royal Ballet in 2006 where he was mentored by Carlos Acosta.

== Career ==
In 2010, Montaño was promoted to First Artist and has been featured in increasingly higher profile roles. His repertory includes Colas (La Fille mal gardée), Jester (Cinderella), Bluebird (The Sleeping Beauty), Caterpillar (Alice's Adventures in Wonderland), Benvolio and the balcony pas de deux (Romeo and Juliet), pas de six (Giselle), pas de trois (Fool's Paradise) and roles in La Vivandière, Raymonda Act III and Chroma.

On February 9, 2014, Montaño produced the world premiere of Narcissus, at the Hippodrome Theatre in London. An evening of live ballet, opera, poetry and classical music concluded with the screening of the new short dance film by Italian director and choreographer Giorgio Madia and starring Montaño. It was filmed at Hotel Therme Vals in Switzerland and set to the music of Claude Debussy's 1894 composition ‘Prelude to the afternoon of a Faun'.

In the summer of 2014, he was promoted to Soloist and toured Russia, China and Taiwan with the Royal Ballet. In July he led a group of nine dancers from the Royal Ballet and English National Ballet to Colombia where they performed three shows with him at the Teatro Colon after he officially re-opened the National Opera House in Bogotá in the company of President Santos.

During the 2015-16, season his appearances included Romeo and Juliet, Carmen, The Two Pigeons and The Nutcracker.

In October 2015, the Colombian/Puerto Rican feature film 'Fragmentos de Amor' was released. Directed by Fernando Vallejo it was the screen debut of Montaño in a small role as a Salsa Dancer.

On November 19, 2015, he made his debut in a Principal role with the Royal Ballet as The Lover during their performance of Frederick Ashton's 'The Two Pigeons'

In the summer of 2016 he toured Japan with the Royal Ballet and was the co-producer and lead performer in 'Vicenza in Lirica 2016 - Shakespeare e Da Porto, lirica d'Amore' at the Teatro Olimpico theatre in Vicenza. During the evening Fernando performed the Balcony and Death scenes from Romeo and Juliet with Roberta Marquez

The 2016 FIFA Futsal World Cup was awarded to Colombia and on September 10, 2016, the opening ceremony was staged at the 18,000 seater Colisea El Pueblo indoor arena in Cali. Montaño was asked to create a new dance and used the occasion to debut 'Foot-Ba', his new mix of dance and football based on the moves and personalities of some of the players. He was supported by 40 dancers from local dance group Swing Latino.

He took a one-year sabbatical from the Royal Ballet from October 2019 and has performed since that time with the Cuban National Ballet as well as dancing in shows in the US, Peru, Paris and Colombia.

In 2022 he made his debut as Othello for the State Ballet of Georgia under the direction of Nina Ananiashvili. He also made his debut at the Arena di Verona, Italy as the Slave and the Matador in La Traviata. Later that summer, he was invited to perform at the Presidential inauguration of the Colombian President Gustavo Petro Urrego.

In 2023 Montano returned to Colombia to lead and produce the Celebration of the 200th Anniversary of the National Museum of Colombia.

== Other Work ==
In 2024 Montano staged his first art exhibition (paintings and sculpture) at Marlborough House, the headquarters of the Commonwealth Secretariat in London.

In 2025 he staged a new style of artistic performance combining his love of dance and painting, producing an original painting entitled Crescendo, while dancing to Ravel's Bolero. This performance was part of the Xenos Art Festival hosted by the historic Museo Santa Maria della Scala in Siena, Italy.

In February 2025 he presented his sculpture of ‘The Sun King Dance’, in tribute to Louis XIV at the French Institute In London as part of the recent collaboration between the Institute and the Science Museum called ‘Versailles in Every Sense.

== Charity ==
Montaño is the Patron of 'Children Change Colombia', formally known as 'Children of the Andes'.

In May 2013, he produced and starred in a gala event in the Matcham Room Theatre at the Hippodrome in London which raised £28,000 for the charity Children of the Andes. He repeated the event in June 2014 and more than £15,000 was raised for the charity. As well as hosting a wide range of Latin America performers he performed two specially created rock-ballet duets with Roxy Music guitarist Phil Manzanera

On October 21, 2014, he produced 'Fernando Montano's Classical Cabaret' at the Hippodrome Theatre in London where he brought together rising stars from the worlds of dance, opera and classical music including mezzo-soprano Justina Gringyte.

On October 29, 2014, at the invitation of President Juan Santos, he made a brief visit to Colombia where he performed 'The Dying Swan' at the Presidential Palace for the President, HRH Prince Charles and HRH Duchess of Cornwall during their State Dinner.

In September 2015 he directed and choreographed 'Fernando Montano and Friends' at the Britten Theatre in London, to raise funds for 'Children Change Colombia' and 'Playing For Change Foundation'. Performers included Elena Gurjidze and Dorothea Herbert and costumes were provided by Dame Vivienne Westwood, Edward Lidster and Elizabeth Emanuel.

In December 2015, he read the BBC Radio 4 Charity Appeal on behalf of Children Change Colombia.

In October 2018, he was made a Patron of The Amy Winehouse Foundation and performed at their annual fundraising gala in London.

On July 18, 2019, he staged 'Fernando Montano and Friends - Dance for the Sea' at the Susie Sainsbury Theatre at the Royal Academy of Music in partnership with the Marine Conservation Society charity. Performers included Oliver Tompsett, Justina Gringyte and Reinis Zarins and the event was hosted by Siân Lloyd with production design by Edward Lidster.

In 2020, Montano was made an ambassador of and presented two podcasts for the Marine Conservation Society called Oceancast. Guests included Deborah Meaden, Colin Jackson, Alexandra Dariescu, Simon Reeve, Susie Rodgers, and Cyrus Todiwala.

While locked down during COVID in Los Angeles in 2020 Montano took part in a 7-hour fundraising dance for the Marine Conservation Society.

In 2021 Montano performed in London in the Ukrainian Ballet Gala directed by the former Royal Ballet principal Ivan Putrov.

He performed two new original ballets for the inaugural season of vildwerk., a nonprofit organization inspiring conservation awareness through dance, in 2024 at the theater of the El Museo del Barrio. Montano has been a founding advisory board member of vilerwerk. since 2022.

== Honours and awards ==
The University of Bath awarded Montaño an Honorary Doctorate of Arts in July 2019. The award recognised his 'achievements in contemporary ballet and his commitment to charitable causes'.

== Filmography ==
- Narcissus (2014)
- Fragmentos de Amor (2015)
- Dancing For Peace (2016)

== Books ==
On March 15, 2019, his autobiography, Una Buena Ventura, was published in Spanish by Penguin Random House.
