= Beach cleaning =

Coastline care

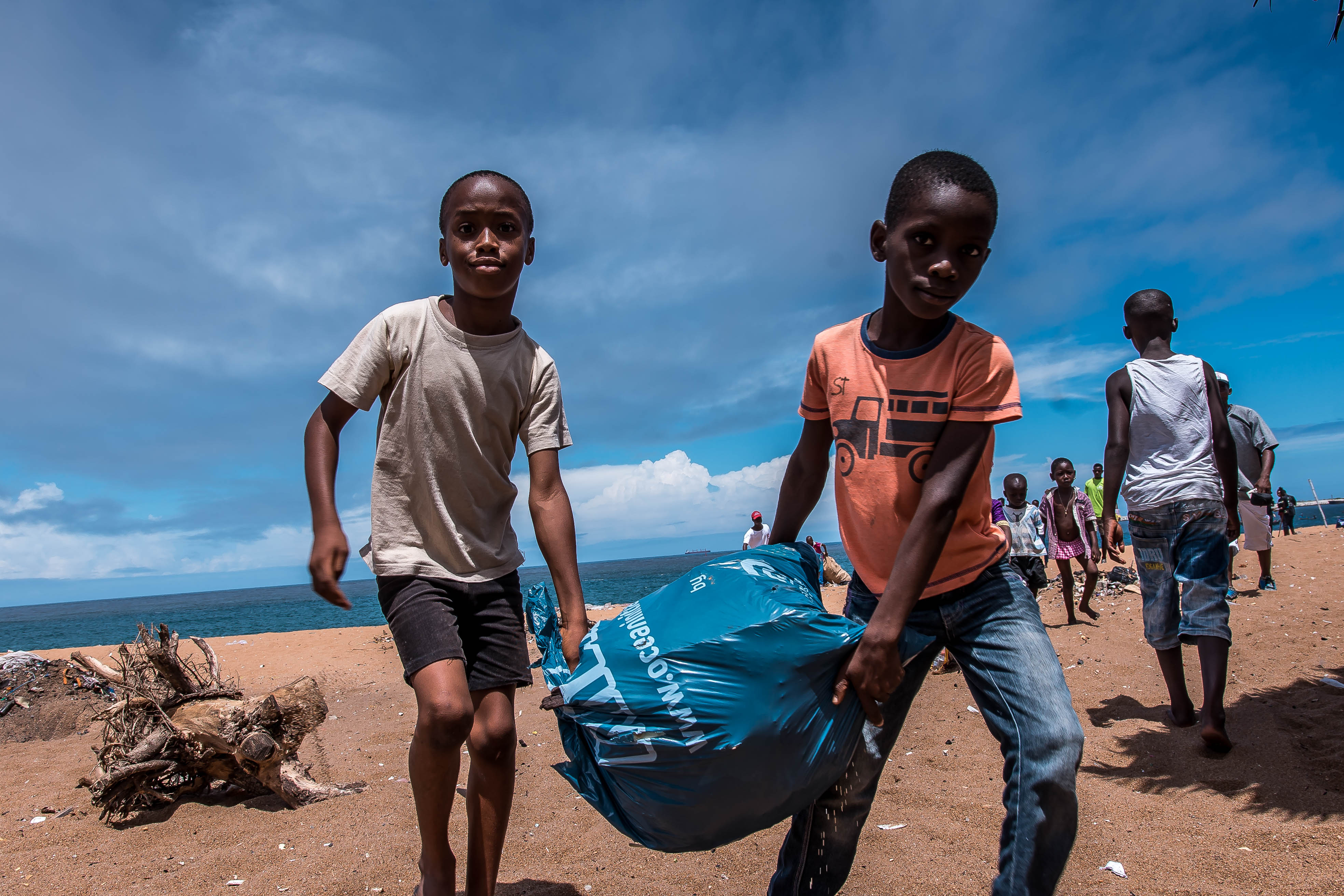
Two children cleaning beach debris in Ivory Coast

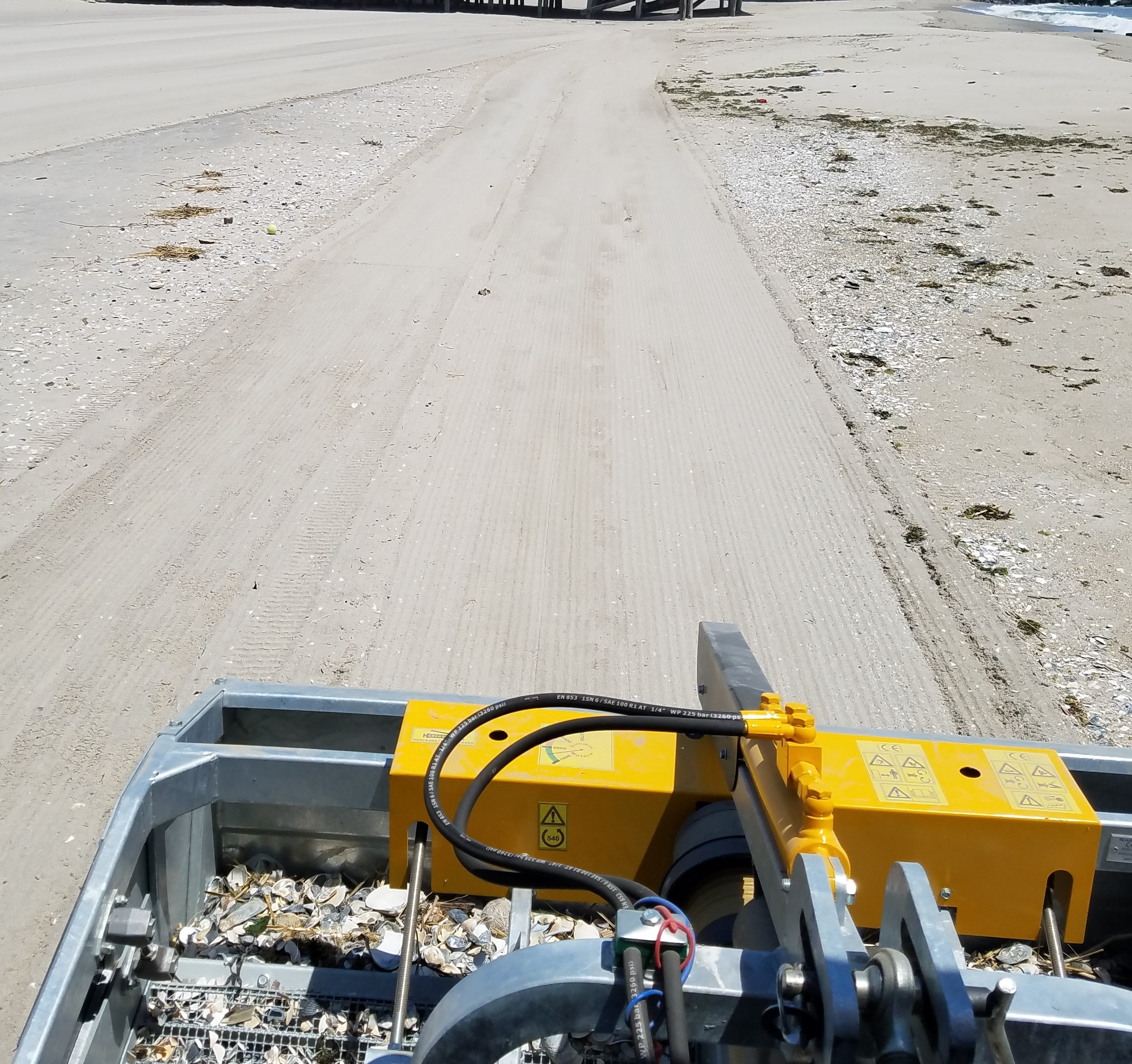
A mechanical beach cleaner with tractor attached removing unwanted beach debris

Beach cleaning or clean-up is the process of removing solid litter, dense chemicals, and organic debris deposited on a beach or coastline by the tide, local visitors, or tourists. Humans pollute beaches with materials such as plastic bottles and bags, plastic straws, fishing gear, cigarette filters, six-pack rings, surgical masks and many other items that often lead to environmental degradation. Every year hundreds of thousands of volunteers comb beaches and coastlines around the world to clean this debris. These materials are also called "marine debris" or "marine pollution" and their quantity has been increasing due to anthropocentric activities.

There are some major sources of beach debris such as beach users, oceans, sea drifts, and river flow. Many beach users leave their litter behind on the beaches after activities. Also, marine debris or chemicals such as raw oil drift from oceans or seas and accumulate on beaches. Additionally, many rivers bring some cities' trashes to beaches. These pollutants harm marine life and ecology, human health, and coastal tourism. Hartley et al.'s (2015) study shows that environmental education is important to eliminate many beach pollutants on beaches and the marine environment.

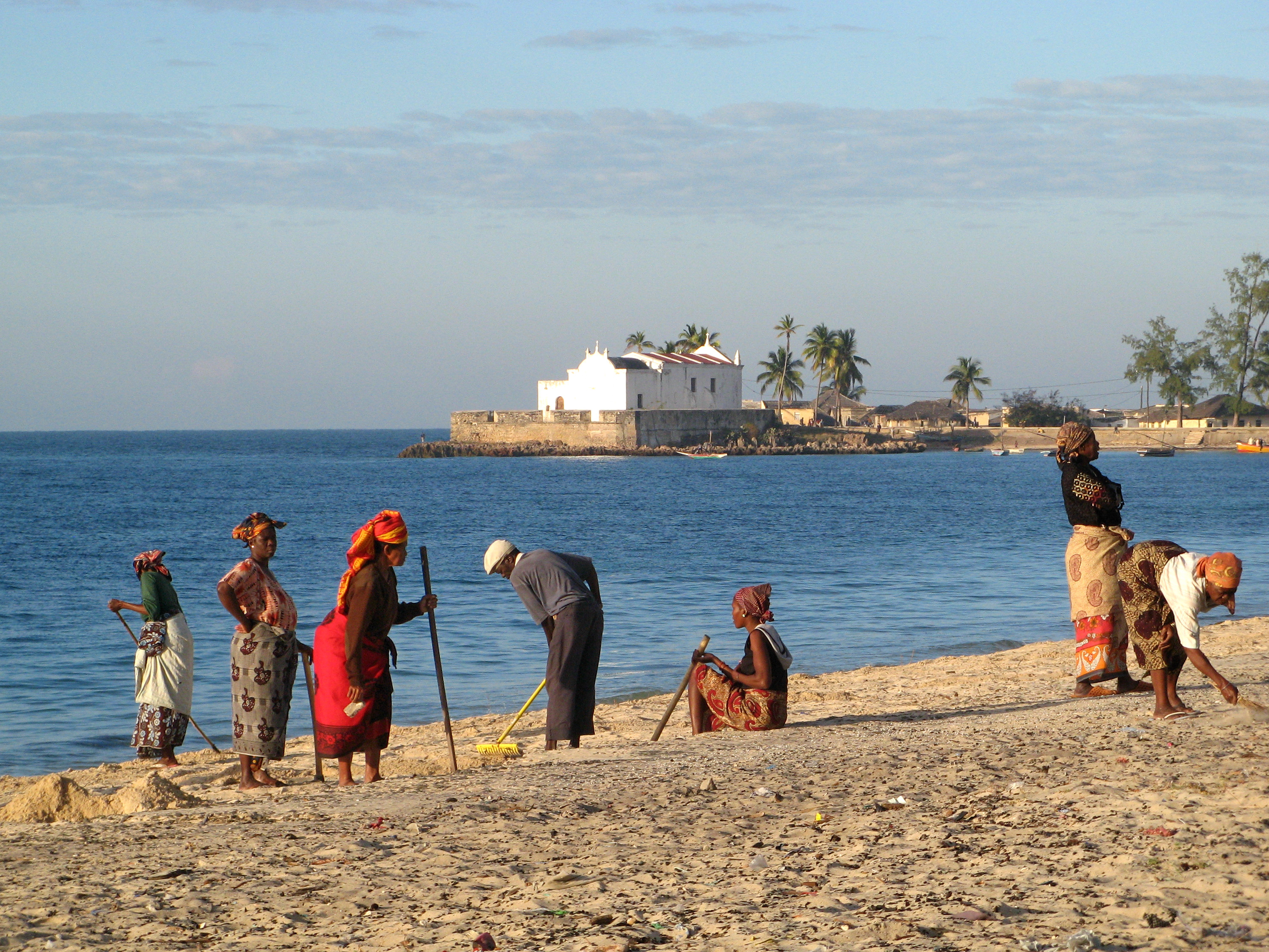
Beach cleaning, Santo António Church in Mozambique Island. 11 August 2009.

== Marine debris ==
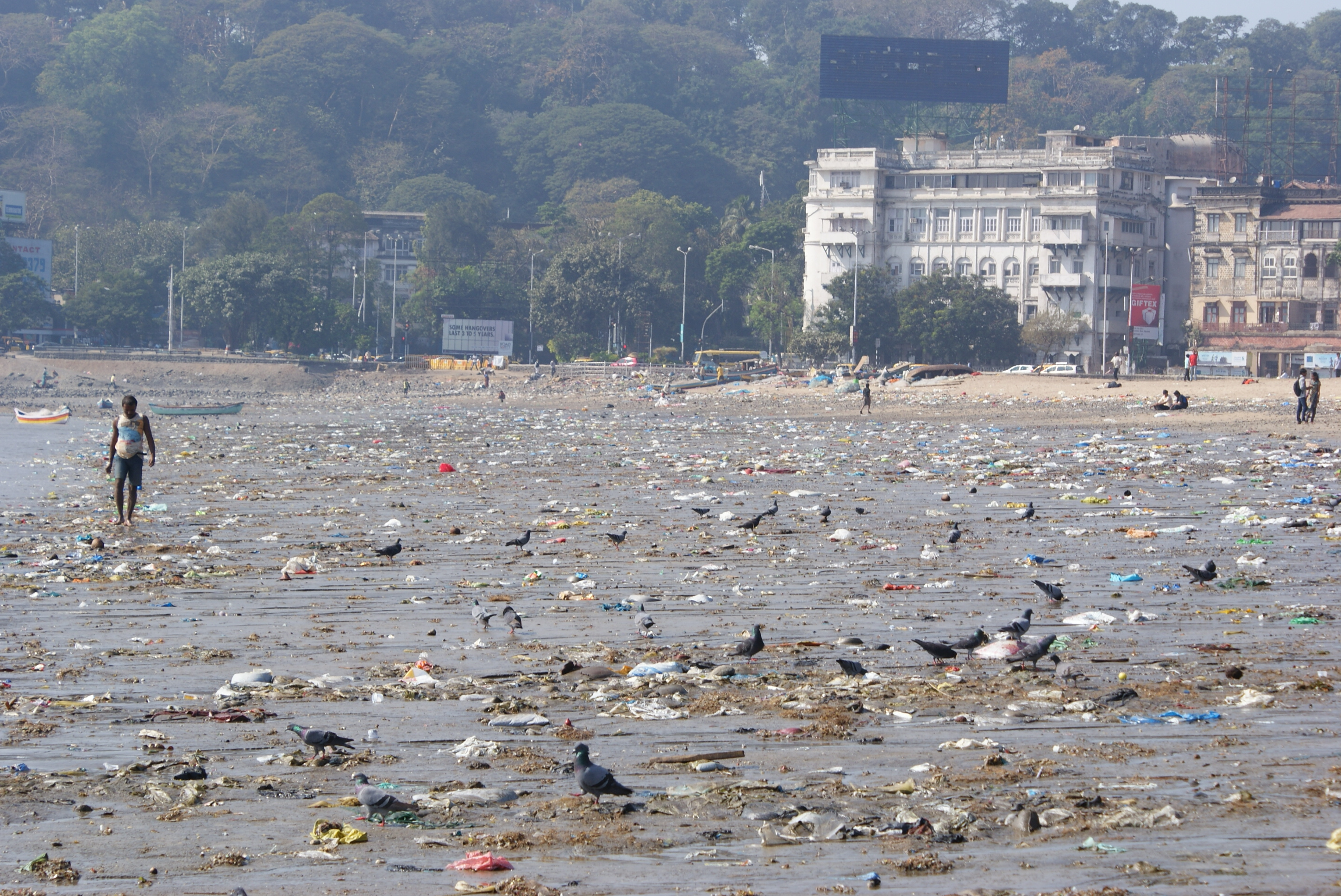
A dirty beach in Bombay, India

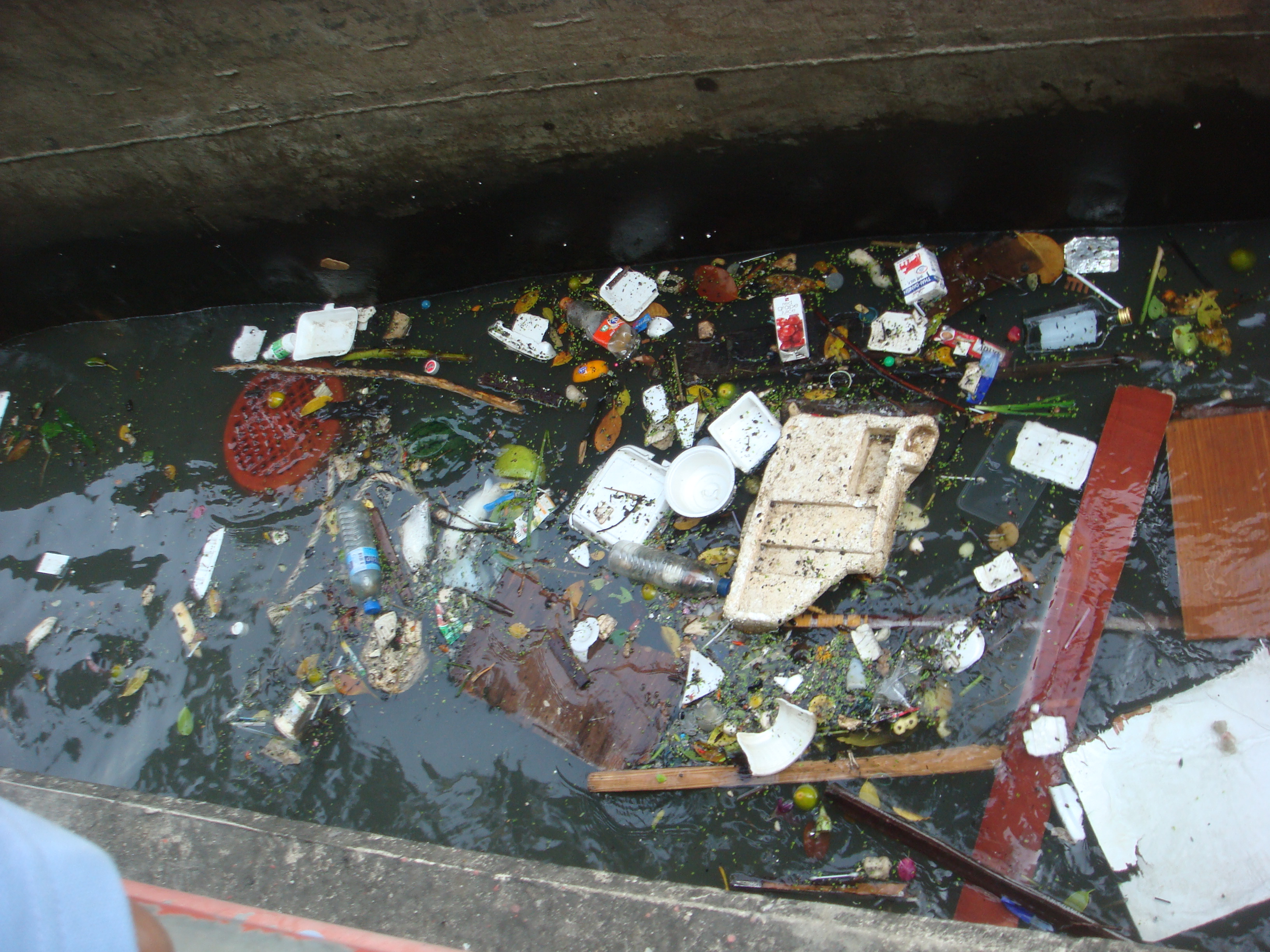
Plastic food packages in Bangkok, Thailand. 8 May 2010.

There are two causes of the degradation of marine ecology and marine debris: the direct forces (population growth, technological development, and economic growth) and proximity forces (land transformation and industrial processes). We can think of the direct forces as underlying causes of why we consume an excessive amount of goods by industry process. The excessive consumption of goods causes marine debris because the goods have been packaged by manufactured cheap non-recycle materials such as plastic. Solid waste plastics cannot decompose easily in nature and their decomposition process takes thousands of years to million years but plastic breaks down into continuously smaller pieces (>5 mm) forming that is called micro-plastics. Thus, such solid waste products are called marine debris that can be seen all through coastlines and on many beaches through the world. There can be many sources of marine debris such as land-based, marine-based, and other anthropocentric activities.

Million tons of land-based waste products such as plastics, papers, woods, and metals end up in seas, oceans, and beaches through the wind, oceans currents (five major gyres), sewage, runoff, storm-water drains and rivers. Massive amount of marine debris has become a severe menace to the marine environment, aquatic life and humankind. Most land-based sources are illegal dumping, landfills, and petrochemical and other industry disposals. Also, other marine-based sources originate from anthropocentric marine activities that are drifted fishing lines, nets, plastic ropes or other petrochemical products from remote islands or lands, shipping vessels or fishing boats by wind and oceanic currents. Marine debris source is also anthropocentric activities of local populations such as beach goers, tourists and city or town sewage.

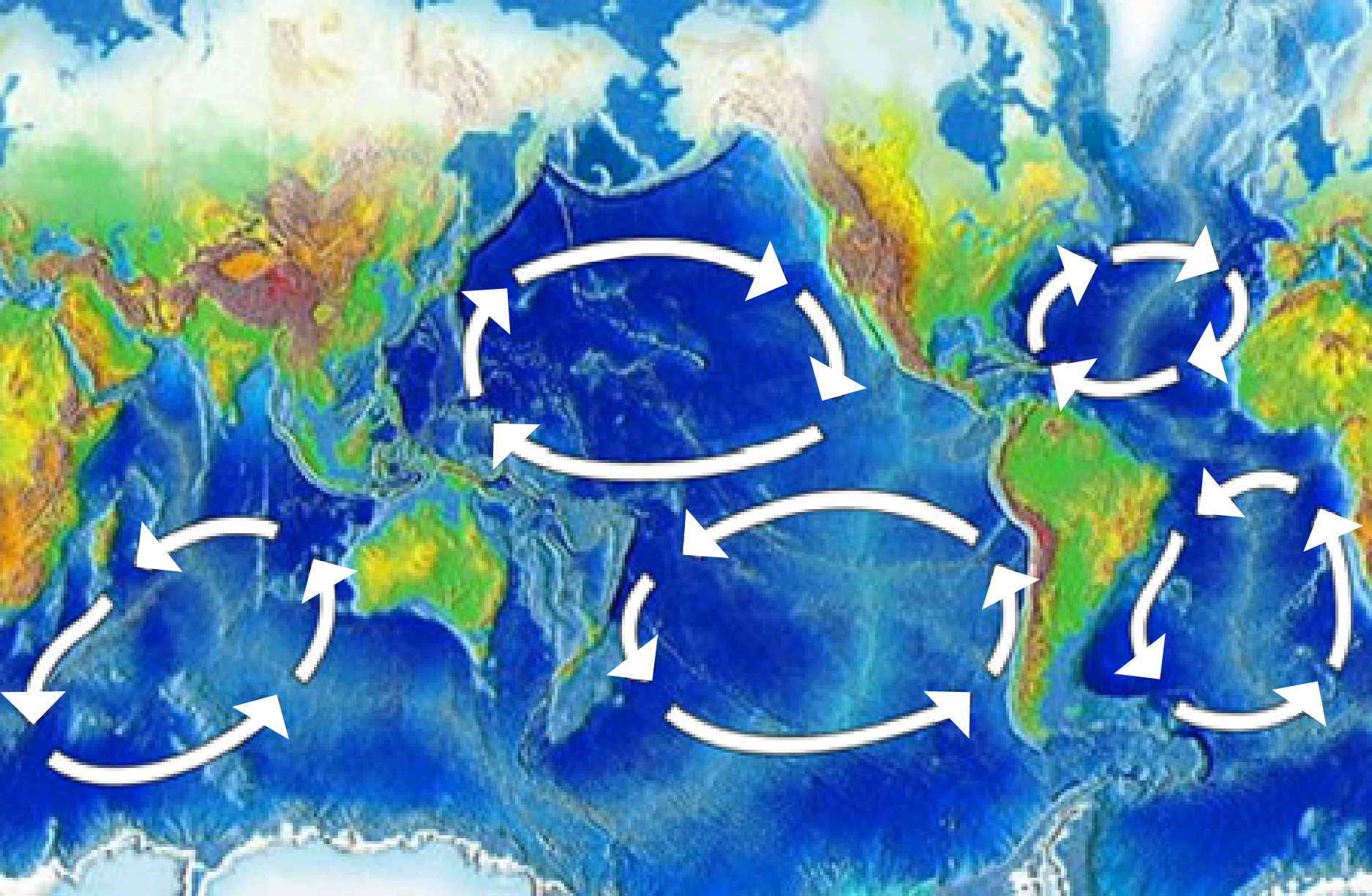
Five major ocean-wide gyres. 25 March 2008.

Montesinos et al., (2020) study of the total amount of 16,123 beach litter items to determine the source of marine debris at 40 bathing areas along the coast of Cádiz, Spain. The study displays that the sources of 88.5% of plastics, 67% cigarette butts, and cloth litters are related to the activity of beach-goers and tourists, 5.5% of cotton swabs, wet wipes, sanitary towels, tampons, and condoms are related to wastewater discharges at places close to rivers and tidal creeks mouths. Besides, the sources of 2.1% fishing lines, nets, and 0.6% Styrofoam are related to fishing activities and marine sources. Besides, some marine debris indicates that they are dumped directly by some international ships or by tourists into the sea on the beach from different countries such as hard food container (from Portugal), a bottle cap (Morocco), a cleaner bottle (Turkey), a food wrapper and other items related to navigation (Germany). Montesinos et al.'s study (2020) demonstrate that some marine debris can travel hundreds of kilometers and end up very far from its source because of the ocean and sea currents.

Also, tropical and subtropical islands are marine pollution hot spots as their relatively vulnerable ecosystems are being severely affected by both local and foreign marine debris. de Scisciolo et al. (2016) study on ten beaches along the leeward and windward coastlines of Aruba that is one of the Lesser Antilles islands located in the Southern Caribbean Sea. They try to determine differences of marine debris in macro (>25 mm), meso-debris (2–25 mm) and micro-debris (<2 mm) densities. The result of their study shows that meso-debris which are rounded plastic products are found on the windward coastlines because the windward coastlines experience higher pressure from distal marine-based debris. Natural factors such as wind and oceanic currents cause the accumulation and distribution of plastic meso-debris to windward coastlines. And macro-debris that contains a larger proportion of originating from eating, drinking and smoking and recreational activities are found leeward sites of the island because the leeward sites experience higher pressures from local land-based debris such as plastic plates, bottles and plastic straws.

=== Ghost gear ===
Marine debris consists of millions of tons of abandoned plastic fishing gear. Nearly 640,000 tons of plastic gear is dumped or abandoned in the oceans every year. According to Unger and Harrison, 6.4 tons of pollutant dumps the oceans every year, and the most of them are consist of by durable synthetic fishing gear, packaging, materials, raw plastic, and convenience items. Such extremely durable plastic gear cannot decompose in the seawater and marine environment and they wash up on beaches driven by inshore currents and wind. Such discarded gear such as plastic fishing lines, nets, and floats are called "ghost gear". About 46% of the 79 thousand of ghost gear that is the size of many football fields has been found at the Great Pacific Garbage Patch constituted in 2018. The discarded fishing nets and lines kill or inflict myriad marine animals such as fish, sharks, whales, dolphins, sea turtles, seals, and marine birds every year. And about 30% of fishing populations have been declining and %70 other marine animals suffer by abandoned gear each year. Besides, the huge fishing industry is an important driver of declines marine ecology by overfishing activities. Overfishing causes when big fishing vessels catch tons of fish faster than stock refills. Moreover, overfishing impacts 4.5 billion people who depend on at least 15% of fish for protein, and fishing is the principal livelihood.

== Benefits ==
=== Public health ===
Clean beaches have many benefits for human health because the polluted beaches imperil human lives by beach accidents. Many items left on beaches such as broken glasses, sharp metals, or hard plastics may injure beach-goers physically. Also, marine debris such as fishing gear or nets may risk human life on the beaches. Such pollutants may be a trap for beach users and cause very serious injuries or drowning accidents for tourists.

=== Ecology ===
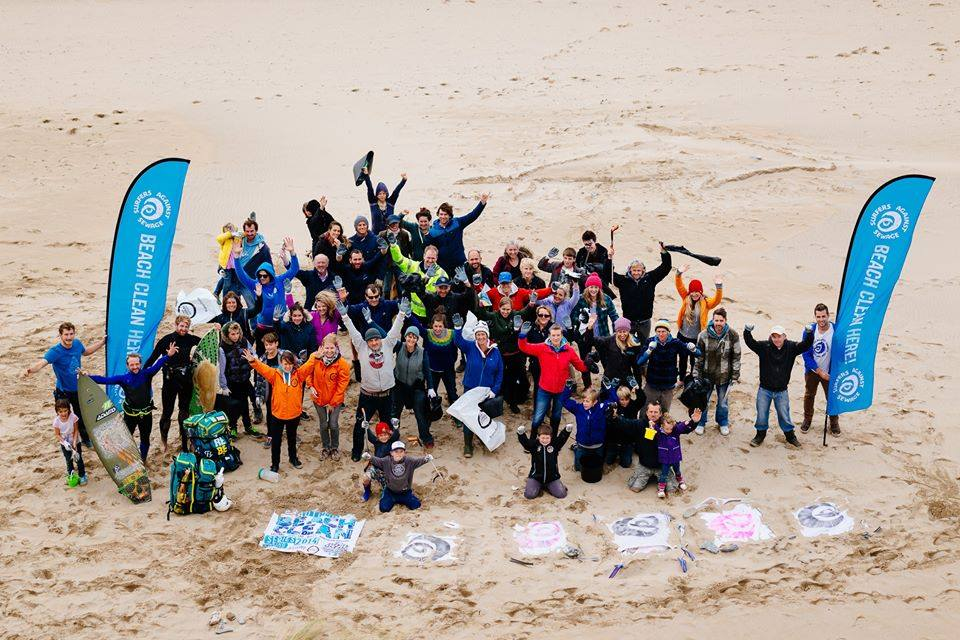
Surfers Against Sewage (SAS) beach clean. 14 November 2014.

Researches on marine debris have substantially increased our knowledge of the amount and composition of marine debris as well as its impacts on the marine environment, aquatic life and people. Marine debris is very harmful to marine organisms such as plants, invertebrates, fish, seabirds, sea turtles and other large marine mammals. Marine debris contains plastic liters that are composed of industrial chemicals or toxins. These chemicals can be destructive to aquatic organisms because toxins accumulate in the tissues of marine organisms and they cause specific effects such as behavioral changes and alterations in metabolic processes. Also, a combination of plastic and seawater materials such as polycyclic aromatic hydrocarbons (PAHs), polychlorinated biphenyls (PCBs) and heavy metals can be fatal for marine life. Moreover, consumption of micro-plastics by larger marine organisms cause obstructions of the intestinal tract that leads to starvation and death because of reduced energy fitness. According to the U.S. Marine Mammal Commission, 111 out of the world's 312 species of seabirds, 26 species of marine mammals, and six out of seven of the words species of sea turtles have experienced issues with beach litter ingestion. Studies reveal that micro-plastics negatively impact human health due to consumption of marine organisms by humans.

In addition to all these impacts, the marine debris and beach litter pose dangers to wildlife on the beaches and marine ecology. Many beach pollutants such as fishing gears and nets or oil spills jeopardize many sea animals including sea turtles, seabirds, and dolphins, and can cause serious injuries or death. Marine animals can become trapped by contaminants such as fishing lines or nets.

The present issue with all of the aforementioned ailments are only made possible from human impacts, and could be ultimately prevented without human and marine interaction. It was reported by the United Nations Joint Group of Experts on the Scientific Aspects of Marine Pollution (GESAMP) that pollution originating from land was said to make up 80% of the world's marine pollution.

=== Sustainability ===
Clean beaches are indicators of the environmental quality and sustainable development level of a country. The Beach Cleaning Health Index is a cleaning classification method of European countries and their environments. The index determines the level of sustainability and cleanness of the countries and their beaches through classification notes such as A for excellent, B for good, C for regular, and D for bad.

There are numerous sustainability indices that have been created in the name of beach health and general appearance. These indexes are dependent on a wide range of variables that are used to assess both the anthropocentric as well as natural changes to beaches. These indexes' variables often merge the goals of both environmental preservation and that of the region to which the beach belongs. In addition to the heath index used in many European countries, in 2005 Israel generated its own beach analysis, their clean coast index (CCI). The goal since the start of this program has been to maintain cleanliness of all Israel's coastline, as well as educate the public on the importance of migrating marine litter. This is one of the first Indexes to determine more than just the amount of waste removed from a beach, as has been done in the past.

The CCI evaluated beach cleanliness every 2 weeks for a period of 7 months. By using this index on a periodic basis they were able to determine what processes worked well and which one did not. Other countries in the Caribbean are employing a different form of beach health index, called the Beach Quality Index (BQI). The BQI assesses many aspects of beaches, not just litter or overall cleanliness, but anthropocentric impacts and long term effects to act somewhat as a checklist for environmental quality issues. The BQI classifies beaches as both urban and urbanized, in the hopes of assessing them to their best ability, and including all factors that may impact varying beaches. The BQI helps by establishing various components and categories to help with this classification, something that not all beach indexes include.

=== Tourism ===
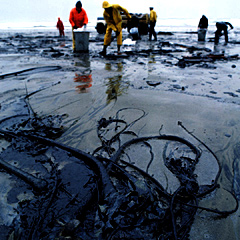
Oils spill cleaning. 5 November 2004.

Beaches are recreational areas and attract many local and international visitors through sunbathing, swimming, walking or surfing activities. This coastal tourism is important for many countries because tourism activities contribute to a large facet of their economy. Therefore, a polluted beach or coastline may substantially impact a country's economy negatively. Contaminated beaches have become a global concern since the beginning of industrialization. Contaminated beaches are unattractive for international and local tourists due to aesthetic value or health concerns. Hutchings et al.'s (2000) study shows that a clean beach is a very important determinant of many local and international tourists in South Africa.

=== Public engagement and awareness, education, and behavior change ===
Participation in beach cleaning is associated with a better understanding of the issue of marine litter and its impacts. Beach cleaning volunteers demonstrated more accurate knowledge of the amount and type of waste in the local environment, as well as greater awareness of the causes and consequences of marine litter. For example, Hartley et al. (2015) found that students that volunteered to clean a local beach with their school could more accurately identify the primary origins of marine litter and estimate the lifespan of plastic. By highlighting the connection between human behavior and marine litter, beach cleaning increases the likelihood that participants will habitually remove and appropriately dispose of coastal trash, as well as engage in prevention and mitigation efforts. By comparing beach cleaning to other coastal activities—walking on the beach and rock pooling—Wyles et al. (2017) aimed to identify the benefits unique to beach cleaning. In doing so, Wyles et al. (2017) discovered that individuals that participated in beach cleaning reported a significantly greater increase in their intention to live an environmentally-friendly lifestyle and their awareness of marine issues compared to other test groups after the intervention.

=== Wellbeing ===
Beach cleaning has been shown to cultivate a positive mood and feeling of fulfillment. Wyles et al. (2017) compared the effect various coastal activities—beach cleaning, rock pooling, and walking on the beach—had on well-being. The study found that participants experienced an improvement in mood across all three activities, although individuals who participated in beach cleaning reported a statistically significant difference in the sense of meaning they derived from beach cleaning compared to walking on the beach and rock pooling.

Additional research on the effects of beach cleaning on personal well being has not been conducted. However, the two core components of beach cleaning—spending time by the ocean and volunteering to advance environmental stewardship—have been associated with improved well-being, mood, and outlook on life. For example, Koss and Kingsley (2010) found that individuals who volunteered at protected marine areas in Australia experienced greater mental and emotional well-being and enhanced connection with the natural environment.

While beach cleaning can improve well-being, Wyles et al. (2017) discovered that participants reported a statistically significant lower level of rejuvenation and relaxation when beach cleaning compared to rock pooling and walking on the beach.

Lastly, the well being benefits associated with beach cleaning are not only limited to the individuals actively removing trash from the coast but can be enjoyed by community members and beach goers as a whole. Wyles et al. (2016) claims that the presence of litter can diminish the psychological benefits of beaches. Beach goers in Wyles et al. (2016) even described feelings of sadness or anger when confronted with litter, explaining that these emotions emerged because the trash negatively impacts the environment and distracts from the beauty of the landscape.

== Methods ==
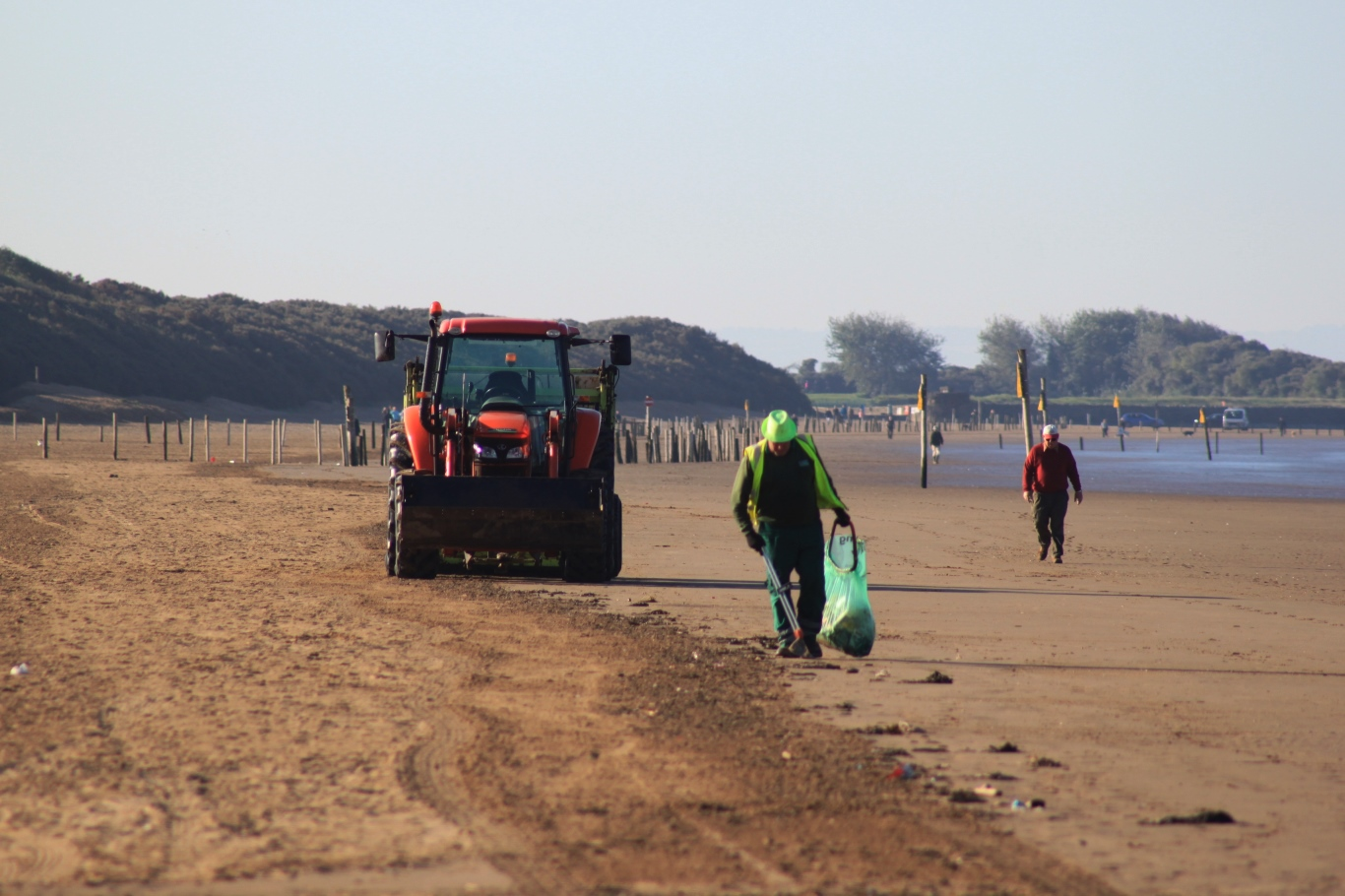
A depiction of both mechanical and manual beach cleaning methods being utilized to clean the Weston-super-Mare beach in Somerset, England

The process of beach cleaning requires good management methods, adequate human resources, and funds. Solid litters cleaning methods are very different than oil spill cleaning methods. The beach cleaning process may be done using machinery such as sand cleaning machines that rake or sift the sand or/and other chemicals such as oil dispersants. This beach cleaning may be done by professionals company, civic organizations, the military or volunteers such as the Great Canadian Shoreline Cleanup and Marine Conservation Society.

=== Mechanical vs. manual cleaning ===
There are two types of beach cleaning—mechanical and manual. These methods are also referred to as mechanical grooming and nonmechanical grooming. Mechanical beach cleaning is defined as litter and/or organic material removal that relies on the work of automatic or push machinery that rakes or sieves the most superficial layer of sand. Manual cleaning involves individuals picking up trash exclusively by hand. The suggested beach cleaning approach incorporates manual and mechanical cleaning as this combination is most cost effective and environmentally sound.

=== Environmental concerns ===
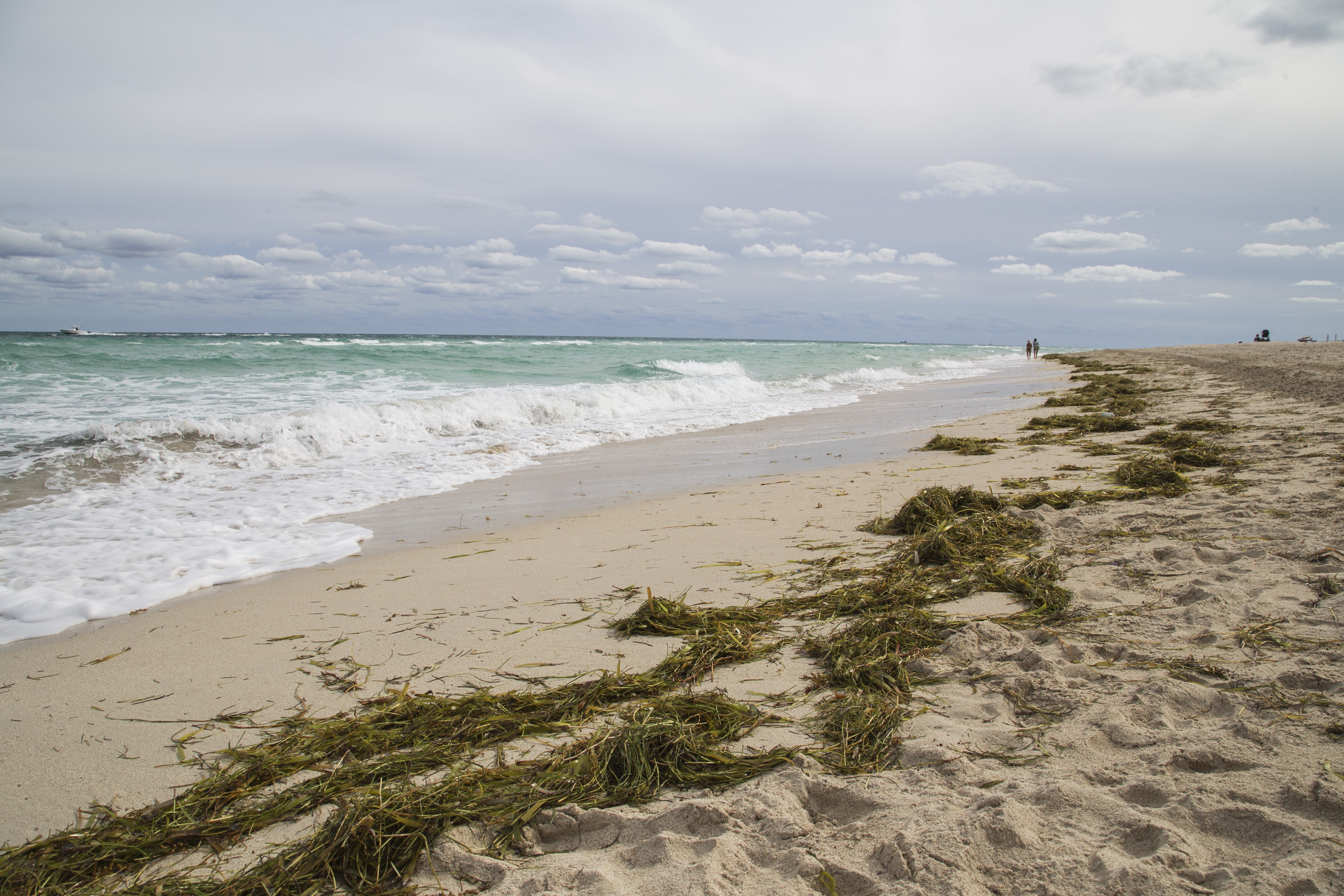
Piles of wrack on a sandy beach. While not visually appealing, these collections of plants and organic material from the sea are central to beach ecosystems and food chains.

==== Wrack cover and biodiversity ====
Mechanical cleaning removes organic materials, like seaweed, algae, and plants, alongside anthropogenic waste, such as plastic bottles, cigarette butts, and food packaging, leading to disturbances in the ecosystem and food chain. Organic materials naturally found on beaches, also known as wrack, provide critical nutrients and compose the foundation of the food chain. The elimination of this food source impacts organisms ranging from meiofauna to predator birds, resulting in a loss of biodiversity and a decrease in species abundance. For example, Dugan et al. studied the relationship between wrack abundance and the richness, abundance, and biomass of macrofauna of fifteen sandy beaches in Southern California and found that ungroomed beaches with relatively low levels of wrack had a mean abundance of macrofauna that thrive in the presence of wrack that was almost nine times greater than groomed beaches. Additionally, ungroomed beaches with relatively large amounts of wrack supported more than thirteen species of macrofauna that live in and around wrack while groomed beaches supported less than three. Furthermore, the presence of two shorebirds was positively correlated with the presence of wrack-associated macrofauna, indicating that beaches with more extensive wrack cover support vertebrates higher in the food chain and create a more rich, biodiverse ecosystem. Overall, the presence of wrack allows for detritivores, like isopods and talitrid amphipod, invertebrates like beetles, foraging birds, and scavenging vertebrates like mice, rats, foxes, and badgers to live and feed in that environment.

==== Wrack removal and public health ====
While removing wrack from beaches can harm the environment, the presence of excessive wrack can threaten beach goers' health. Collections of wrack decompose quickly which generates a foul odor. This environment attracts unpleasant, and even dangerous microbes and animals. Flies and buzzards are drawn to the smell of the decomposing wrack. While a large bird population increases biodiversity, the birds leave their droppings which also increase the density of potentially harmful microbes in the sand. Additionally, microbes that thrive in the presence of feces, called fecal indicator organisms, can reproduce in the conditions created by decomposing wrack. Wrack can sustain potentially harmful bacteria and fecal indicator organisms like Escherichia coli and Enterococci, which can cause gastrointestinal illness. In fact, a positive relation between time spent on wet sandy beaches and the incidence of contracting a gastrointestinal illness has been identified.

==== Topographic and vegetation alterations ====
Groomed beaches are wider, sustain substantially less vegetation, and have fewer and flatter topographic features, like dunes and hummocks, than ungroomed beaches. Naturally beaches should have a narrow stretch of sand closest to the ocean that is flattened by the tide below the extreme high tide line. Beyond this zone, the land should be composed of vegetated dunes that are infrequently touched by tides. However, mechanical beach cleaning has converted many beaches into much wider expanses of flat sand, most of which remains undisturbed by the tide and void of vegetation. Mechanical beach cleaning destroys vegetation, hummocks, and newly-formed dunes, leading to an immediate flattening of the landscape. Mechanical cleaning not only damages existing vegetation but deters the growth of future vegetation. Dugan and Hubbard found that the groomed portions of a beach experienced significantly lower rates of plant survival and reproduction after germination than the ungroomed sections of the same beach.

As vegetation abundance and the height and presence of dunes and hummocks decrease, sand transport patterns change in a way that furthers the extent of flattened topography. Hummocks, dunes, and vegetation act as obstacles that slow sand movement triggered by the wind. When these features disappear, the formation of future hummocks and dunes becomes more difficult and unlikely.

As beaches grow flatter and wider, the abundance and diversity of vegetation decreases further because vegetation requires stable sand dunes to take root and grow.

In this way, mechanical beach cleaning triggers a positive feedback loop that exacerbates the flattening and widening of beaches alongside the loss of vegetation abundance and diversity. Halting mechanical beach cleaning stops this cycle and can rebuild the damaged topography and lost vegetation. For example, Dugan and Hubbard observed that four years after stopping mechanical grooming, the San Buenaventura State Beach recovered 20 to 40 meters of vegetation, formed new hummocks and the beginning stages of sand dunes, improved sand stability, and increased the number of plants that survived beyond germination.

=== Best practices ===
A number of best practices for carrying out beach cleaning have been discussed in the literature.

==== Combination of mechanical and manual cleaning methods ====
This method allows urban and more intensely used beaches to manage larger quantities of litter while minimizing the environmental impact of mechanical cleaning. In fact, beaches cleaned less than three times a week sustain a level of biodiversity and species abundance that is similar or only slightly lower than beaches that are strictly cleaned by hand. For example, Morton et al. (2015) found that mechanical beach cleaning did not affect biodiversity but concede that this likely due to the fact that the beach only underwent mechanical cleaning once to twice a week and had moved wrack from popular sections of the beaches to less commonly visited sites. Additionally, Stelling-Wood et al. (2016) studied ghost crab populations as an indicator species for overall biodiversity on sandy beaches and discovered that the frequency of mechanical beach cleaning was the most influential factor on population size. Beaches that were mechanically cleaned less than three times a week housed the highest number of ghost crabs.

==== Reduction of quantity of beach litter through educational programs ====
Educational programs and volunteering effectively catalyze behavior change and awareness around marine pollution, leading to a reduction in marine debris and a willingness to clean that is present on beaches. More information can be found about the benefits of educational and volunteer programs under the Public Engagement and Beach Cleaning header of this page. Decreasing the quantity of marine litter makes manual beach cleaning an easier, more effective option, even for urban, frequently used beaches.

==== Relocation of collections of wrack to ungroomed or less popular areas of a beach ====
In doing so, the critical nutrient provided by wrack remains in the ecosystem, limiting disruptions to the food chain and ecosystem. Oftentimes, the nutrients from wrack will be redistributed to groomed portions of the beaches through wind and waves. For this reason, it is most important that this suggestion be implemented on beaches with consistently low tides.

== Public engagement and beach cleaning ==
There are three primary ways the public can learn about or participate in beach cleaning: educational programs, awareness campaigns, and volunteering. All modes of public engagement can increase awareness of the issue of marine litter, educate participants about marine litter and ocean conservation, and motivate behavior change. When volunteers participate in beach cleaning, they can use mechanical or manual methods.

=== Educational programs and awareness campaigns ===
Educational and awareness campaigns can be developed by schools or promoted by government. Both have effectively enhanced their target audience's knowledge of marine litter, perception of the extent of the issue, and catalyzed behavior change.

Multiple studies research the impact of service learning programs on students' level of knowledge accumulation and awareness of both marine litter and broader marine conservation issues. For example, Owens (2018) studied the self-reported change in students' perception of their knowledge about ocean conservation and environmental behavior. The study compared the responses of two groups: an undergraduate class enrolled in a seminar course supplemented by a service learning opportunity cleaning beaches and an undergraduate class enrolled in a traditional laboratory-based environmental science course. Students who participated in beach cleaning reported a significantly greater perception of knowledge and environmentally-friendly behavior compared to the students in the laboratory-based class. The students who participated in beach cleaning also saw a significantly greater increase in their scores for perceived knowledge and environmentally-friendly behavior compared to the other cohort.

Educational campaigns can spread knowledge and incite behavior change beyond the target audience. For example, Hartley et al. (2015) explains that students who participated in beach cleaning with their school encouraged their friends and family to join them in adopting mitigation and prevention behaviors.

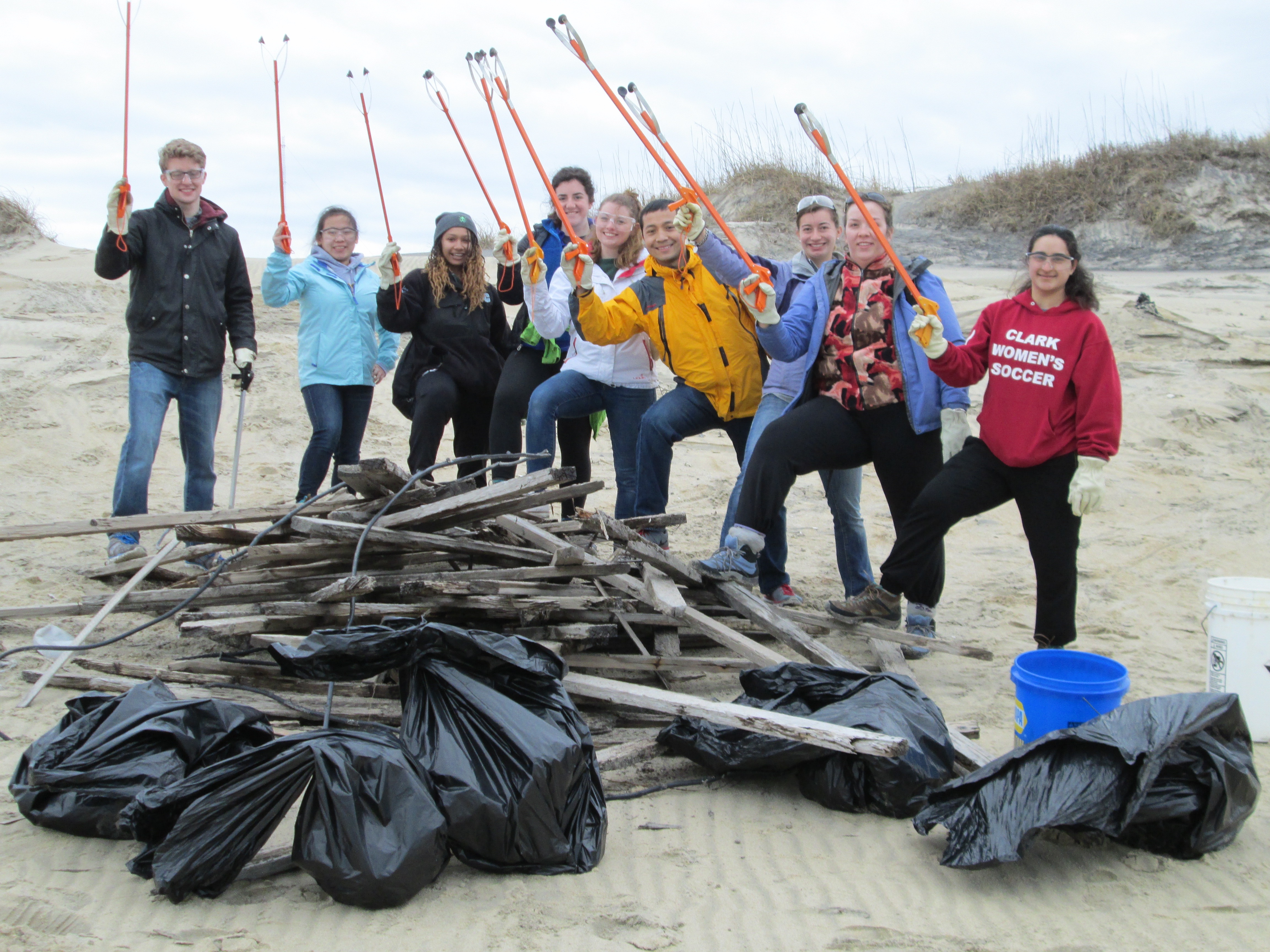
Group of students from University of Vermont volunteering with the North Carolina Beach Buggy Association to clean Cape Hatteras National Seashore in North Carolina

=== Volunteering ===
Volunteering improves participants' awareness and knowledge about marine litter and increases the likelihood that individuals will take continued action to address the issue. For example, Hartley et al. (2015) claims that after volunteering to clean a local beach with their school, children reported engaging in mitigation and prevention behavior more frequently, such as purchasing fewer, single-use plastic items, appropriately disposing of their waste, and recycling. Uneputty et al. (1998) found that individuals who had volunteered to clean beaches continued to remove trash from beaches and not litter months after they had participated in a volunteer program. Furthermore, surveys and interviews have revealed that once individuals begin volunteering in marine conservation efforts, they want to continue.

Multiple studies have determined that volunteers, whether organized through schools and universities or individual interest, can significantly reduce the quantity of solid waste on beaches.

Numerous volunteer beach cleaning programs have been facilitated by schools that promote service learning opportunities. These studies, in conjunction with research conducted with participants that joined programs entirely voluntarily, have demonstrated that groups that were and were not previously concerned about marine litter can experience an increase in awareness and knowledge, as well as positive behavior change through the hands on experience and learning involved in volunteering.

Beach cleaning volunteers reap the same, if not more, benefits from their participation as individuals who participate in other coastal activities. Wyles et al. (2017) studied the impact various coastal activities—beach cleaning, rock pooling, and walking on the beach—had on well-being and discovered that all three led to a similar betterment in mood. However, individuals who participated in beach cleaning described a more intense sense of fulfillment when compared to the groups.

While further research has not been completed on the mental and emotional benefits of beach cleaning, volunteers who promote environmental stewardship have reported improvements in their well-being.

=== Public engagement and collection methods ===
A study conducted in Catalonia in the late 1990s found that, on the beaches of the Llobregat Delta, engaging with the public through manual methods of beach cleanup improved citizen participation as compared to mechanical methods. Moving towards manual cleaning by citizens can benefit both the environment and aid in the local municipalities work of keeping the beaches clean. Dominguez's 2005 study found a correlation between citizens and the use of manual beach cleaning methods. This study also found that the amount of manual labor as well as employees required to manually clean stretches of beaches to be much less than anticipated.

== Most polluted and cleanest beaches in the world ==
=== Most polluted beaches ===
Many researchers report that ocean currents transfer floating litter by the five subtropical gyres. Thus, anthropocentric marine debris is present in all oceans, beaches and at the sea surface, even the Arctic sea ice contains small plastics particles or micro-plastics. According to Bhatia (2019), the ten most polluted beaches in the world are:

1. Phú Quốc, Vietnam.
2. Maya Bay, Thailand.
3. Kamilo Beach, Hawaii, US.
4. Kuta Beach, Indonesia.
5. Juhu Beach, India.
6. Kota Kinabalu, Malaysia.
7. Guanabara Bay, Brazil.
8. Serendipity Beach, Cambodia.
9. Haina, Dominican Republic.
10. San Clemente Pier, California, US.

=== Cleanest beaches ===
According to Nguyen (2019), there are still some clean beaches around the world. To find out if a beach is clean or not is to look for a blue flag. The Blue Flag is the world's most recognized voluntary eco-labels awarded to beaches, marinas, and sustainable boating tourism operators. The blue flag shows when a beach has high environmental and quality standards. The six the cleanest Blue Flag awarded beaches are:

1. Victoria Beach, Canada.
2. Santa Maria Beach, Los Cabos.
3. Dado Beach, Israel.
4. Mellieha Bay, Malta.
5. Palmestranden Beach, Denmark.
6. Zona Balnear da Lagoa, Portugal.

== Gallery ==
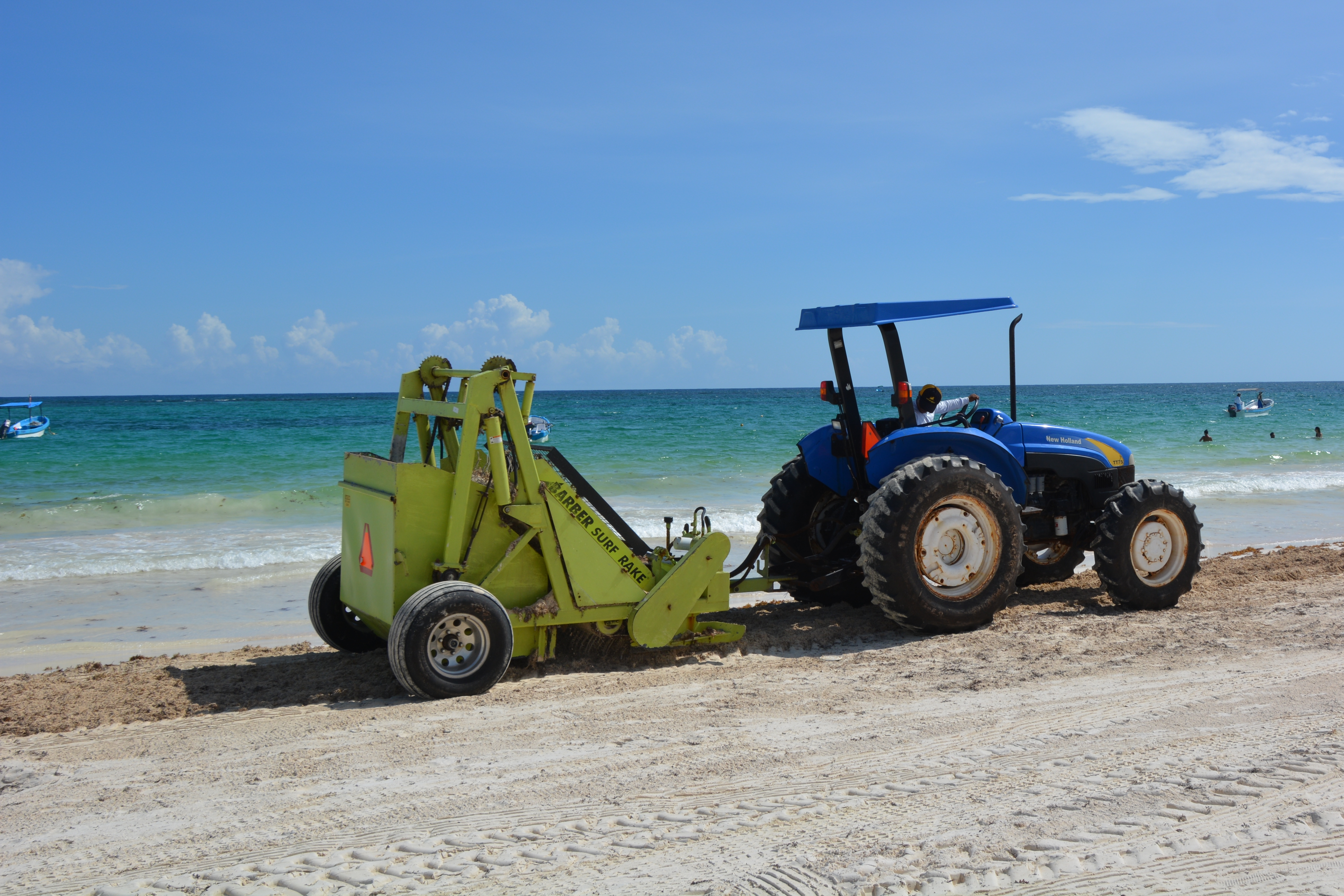
Beach cleaning vehicles

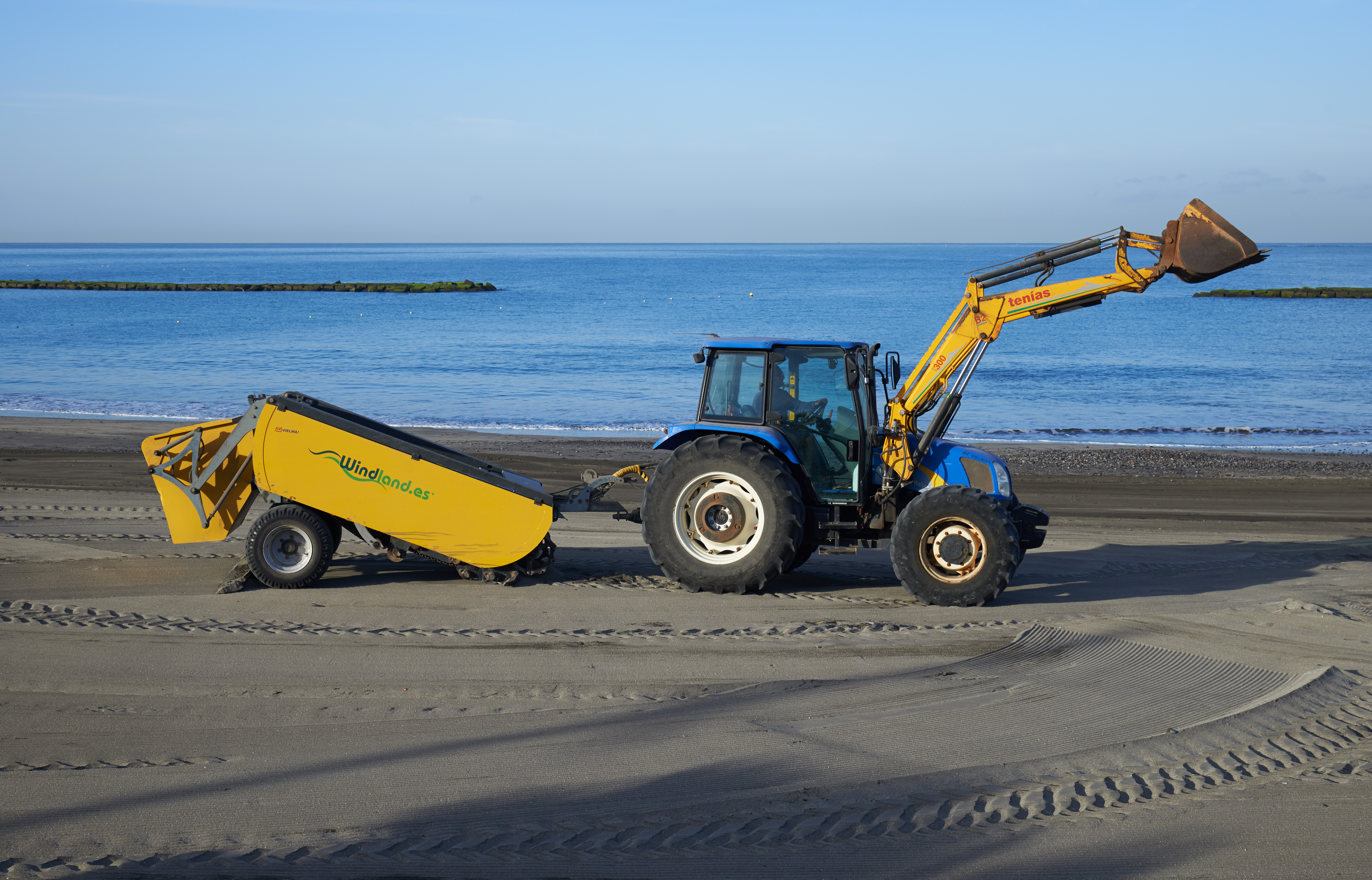
Beach cleaning vehicles

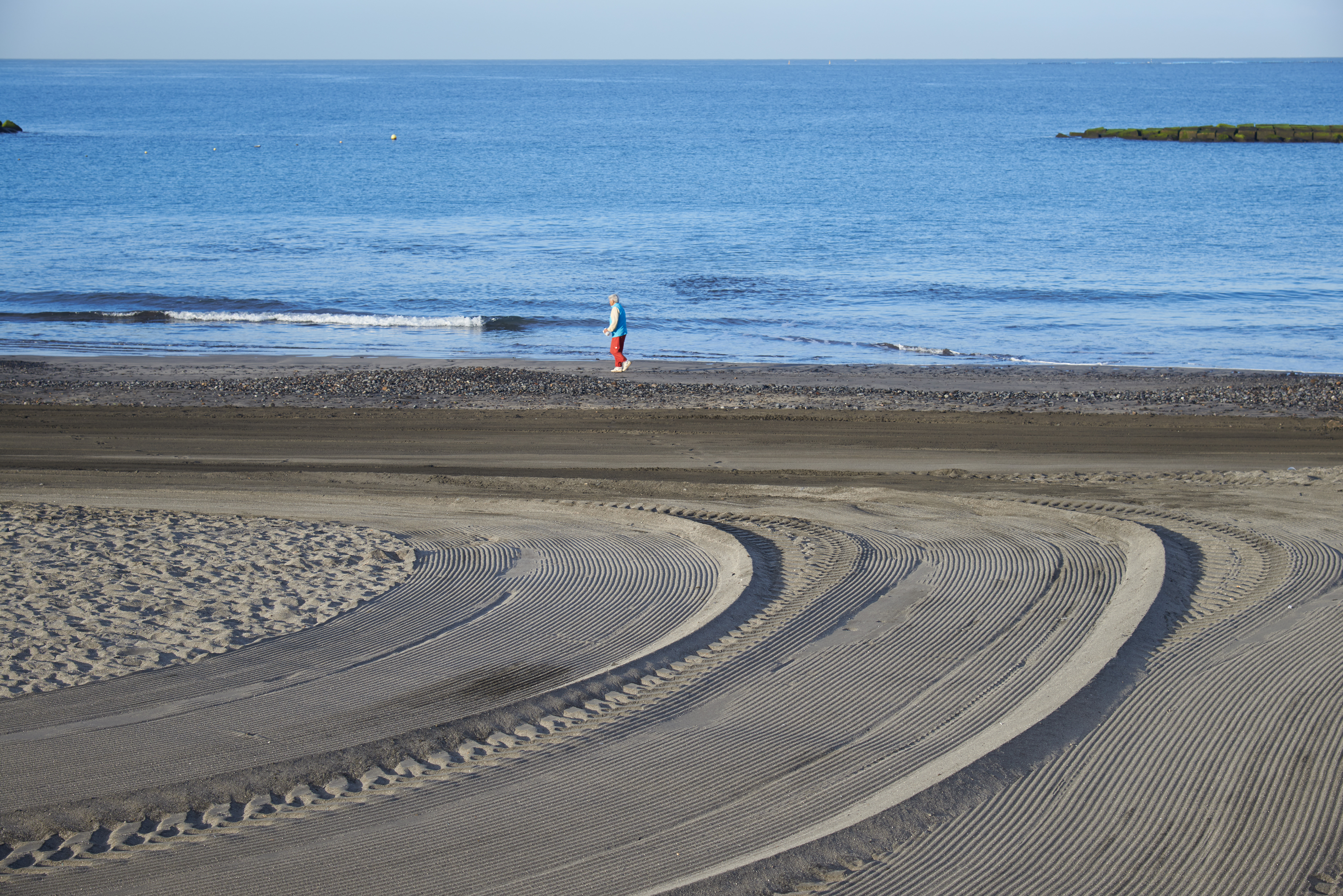
After beach cleaning by a cleaning vehicle

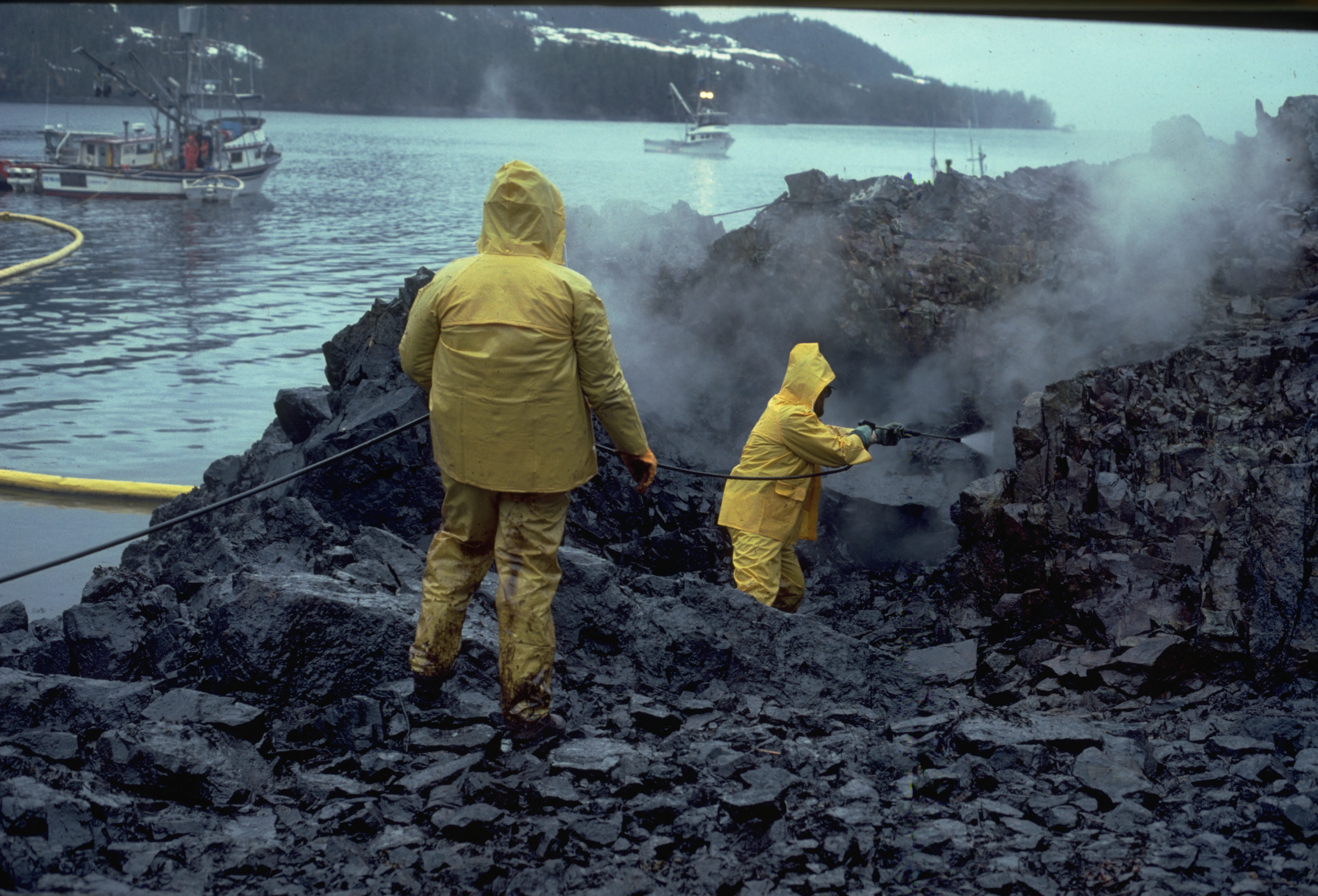
Oil beach cleaning

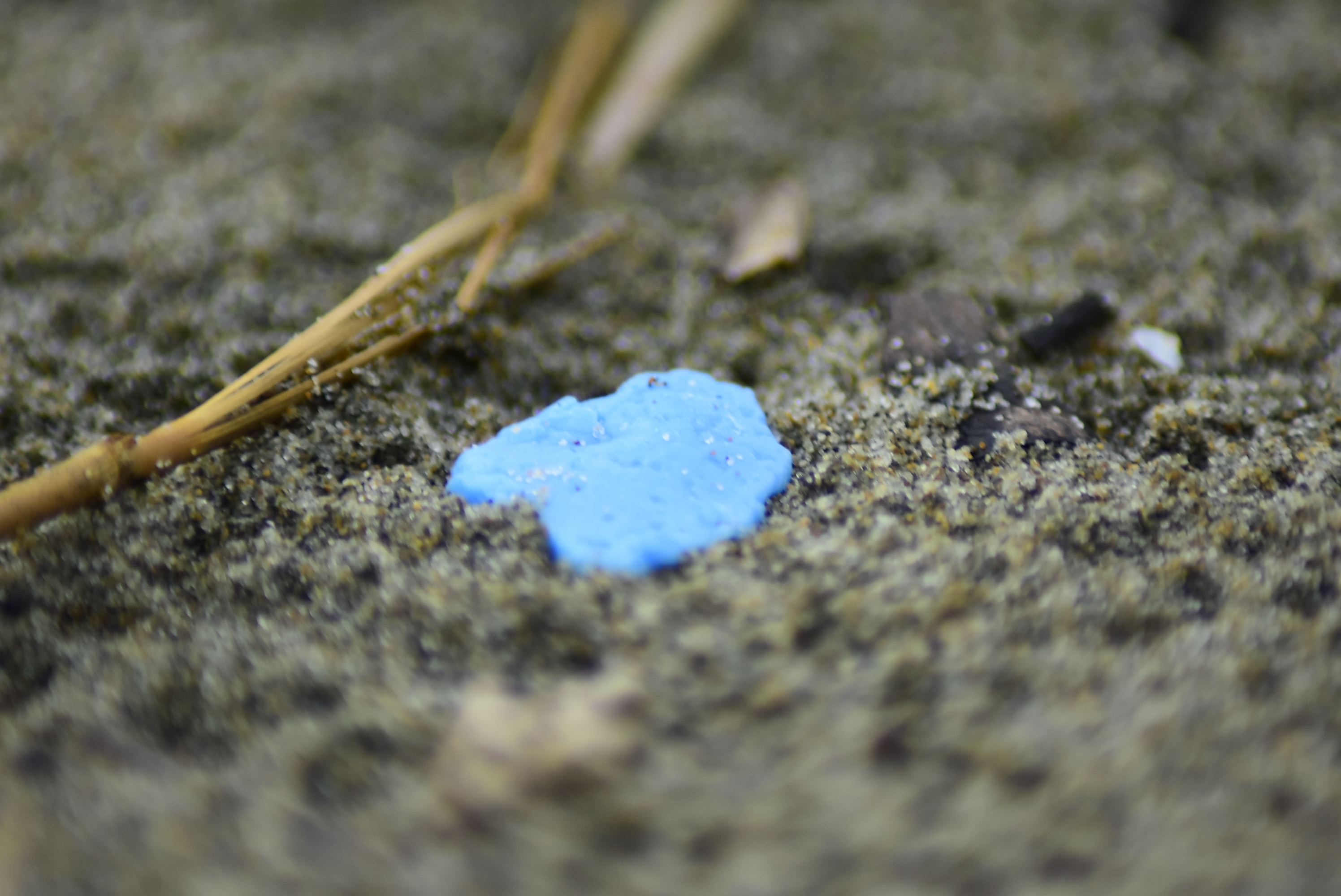
Micro-plastic

== See also ==
- Global warming
- Anthropocene
- Ecology
- Marine ecosystem
- Oil spill
- Earth Day
- Exploding whale
- Sargassum
- Marine Conservation Society
- Ocean Conservancy
- The Ocean Cleanup
