= Country Captain =

Curried chicken dish

Country captain
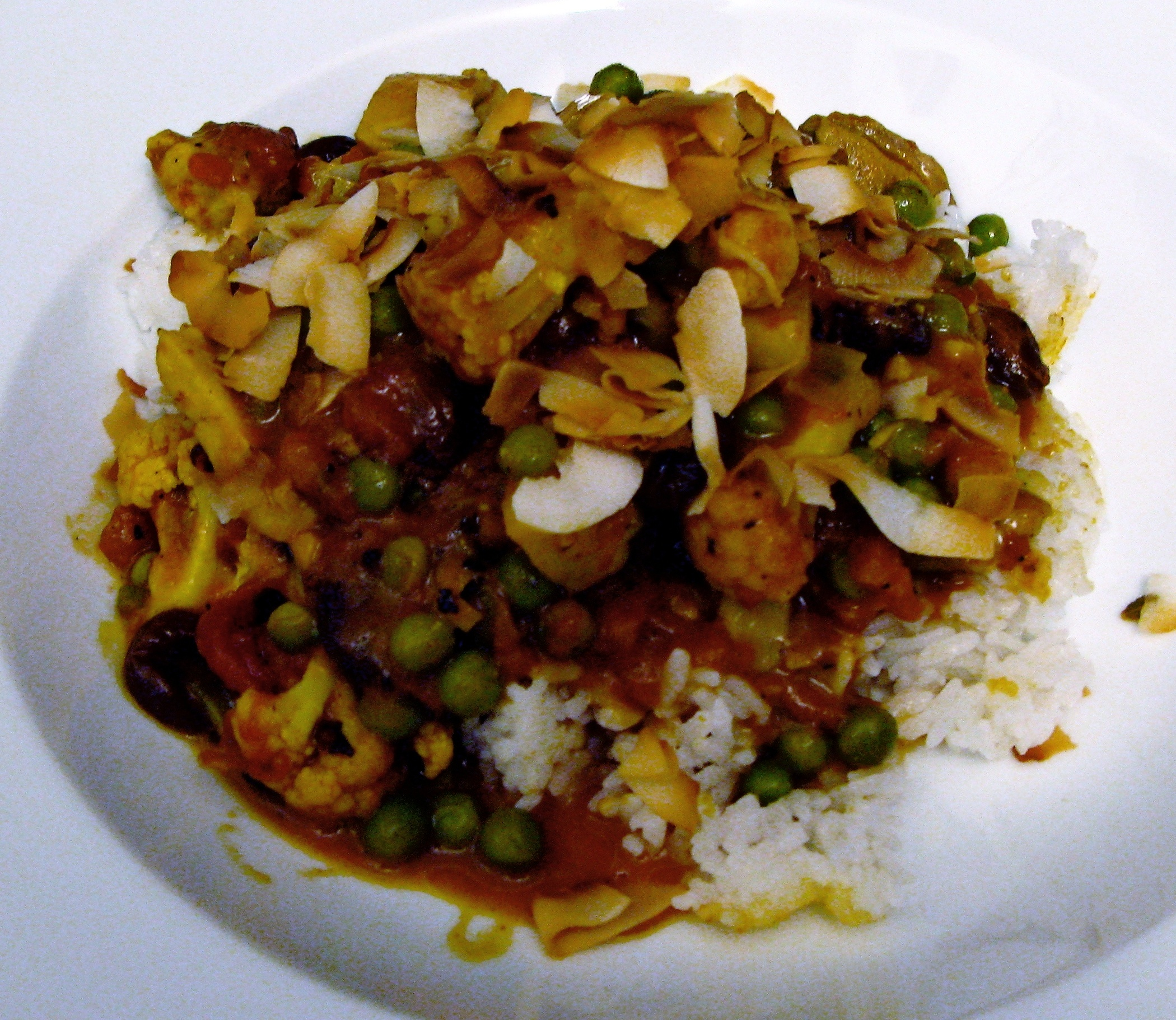
- Country captain
- Type: Curry
- Place of origin: Indian subcontinent
- Main ingredients: chicken, onions, curry powder; usually golden raisins and almonds

Country captain is a curried chicken dish, often served with rice, popular in the Southern United States. It was introduced to the United States through Charleston, Savannah, New York City, and Philadelphia, but has origins in Anglo-Indian cuisine from the time of the British Raj in India. The dish was included in the U.S. military's Meal, Ready-to-Eat packs from 2000 to 2004, in honor of its being a favorite of George S. Patton.

It has appeared on television shows in both the United States and in the United Kingdom, with chefs Bobby Flay, Atul Kochhar and Cyrus Todiwala all cooking the dish. Todiwala served his version to Queen Elizabeth II as part of her Diamond Jubilee celebrations.

== History ==
=== Anglo-Indian origins ===
Country captain originated in Anglo-Indian cuisine during the British Raj in India as a simple spatchcock poultry or game recipe involving onions and curry and possibly enjoyed by British officers. Henrietta Hervey, in her 1895 book Anglo-Indian Cooking at Home, gave a recipe for the Anglo-Indian dish for a British audience back in England.

=== Arrival in the American South ===
One theory is that an early 19th-century British sea captain, possibly from the East India Company, working in the spice trade introduced it to the American South via the port of Savannah. The dish remains popular amongst the communities in Mumbai, India. The "country" part of the dish's name dates from when the term referred to things of Indian origin instead of British, and so the term "country captain" would have meant a captain of Indian origin, a trader along the coasts of India. Others claim that the word "captain" in the title is simply a corruption of the word "capon".

In 1991, The New York Times columnist Molly O'Neill researched the origin of the dish, which had been a steady feature in southern cookbooks since the 1950s. Working with Cecily Brownstone, they discovered that the dish originally published in the United States in the pages of Miss Leslie’s New Cookery Book published in Philadelphia in 1857. The recipe required a "fine full-grown fowl". It also appeared in the kitchens of Alessandro Filippini, who was a chef with a restaurant on Wall Street in the 19th century.

=== Popularity ===
Fans of the dish have included Franklin D. Roosevelt, who encountered country captain while visiting the Little White House in Warm Springs, Georgia. Roosevelt introduced it to George S. Patton, and it was Patton's love for the dish which subsequently resulted in it being added in his honor to the U.S. Army's Meal, Ready-to-Eat field rations in 2000. A variety of Southern chefs have recipes for the dish, including Paul Prudhomme, Paula Deen and Emeril Lagasse. The dish was featured on an episode of Throwdown! with Bobby Flay in season 6 guest-starring Matt and Ted Lee. It appeared on the BBC One cooking show, Saturday Kitchen, with chef Atul Kochhar cooking the regular chicken and rice version of the dish.

== Dish ==
=== Basic form ===
In its basic form, country captain is a mild stew made with browned chicken pieces, onions, and curry powder. Almonds and golden raisins or zante currants are usually added. Many versions also call for tomatoes, garlic, and bell peppers. The dish is served over white rice. With the exception of the rice, it is meant to be cooked all in the same pot. Chef Mamrej Khan has referred to the dish as one of the first fusion dishes to be developed, making it part of the Anglo-Indian cuisine.

=== Variations ===
Chef Cyrus Todiwala cooked a variation of country captain on Saturday Kitchen. His version was similar to shepherd's pie, in that the meat was baked under a layer of potato. He had previously cooked the dish for Queen Elizabeth II and the Duke of Edinburgh at Krishna Avanti Primary School in Harrow as part of the Queen's Diamond Jubilee celebrations in 2012. That version of the dish used a rare breed of lamb from the Orkney Islands which had been fed on seaweed. The dish is also now on the menu of Todiwala's London restaurant, Café Spice Namasté.

== See also ==
- Cuisine of the Southern United States
- Indian cuisine
