= A Cook Abroad =

2015 British television program

- Genre: Cooking
- Country of origin: United Kingdom
- Original language: English
- No. of seasons: 1
- No. of episodes: 6

Production
- Executive producer: Gill Tierney
- Producer: Helen Simpson
- Running time: 58 Minutes

Original release
- Network: BBC Two
- Release: 2 February – 9 March 2015

A Cook Abroad is a BBC television program in which a celebrity chef travels to another country in order to discover recipes. Originally released in 2015, the program attempts to showcase food from different countries and cultures around the world. The opening sequence is "Six cooks, six countries six incredible journeys".

== Episodes ==
No.	Host chef	Travel location	Original release date
1	Dave Myers	Egypt	2 February 2015
Myers starts with the street food of Cairo to see how they make Baladi bread and falafel. He follows the Nile to find the origins and history of bread, both flat bread common in the area as well as the origins of levied bread through shamsi bread. David also discovers molokhia, which is traditionally grown in the area.
2	Tony Singh	India	9 February 2015
Singh starts in Amritsar during Diwali where he looks at the links between the Sikh faith and food. He follows the history of the nation as well as of his own family. He then moves into Delhi where he gets to know the Sikh warriors, the Nihang, and how they eat with their nomadic life. He meets a member of the Maharajah and cooks the food of luxury.
3	John Torode	Argentina	16 February 2015
Torode starts in Buenos Aires where he discovers the sad truth of feed lots in Argentina cattle. He then moves on to meet people still farming in the traditional way of the gaucho. He moves on to working with a local butcher to understand how to breakdown the animal into the favourite cuts of beef.
4	Monica Galetti	France	23 February 2015
Galetti travels to France in order to find the origins of some of her favourite ingredients that are used in her high end restaurant. She starts in the Jura Mountains with Vin Jaune and Comte. She helps on a cattle farm and in a cheese factory to make Mont D'Or cheese. She then hunts boar using the traditional method of hunting using dogs as well as forges for her own meal.
5	Rick Stein	Australia	2 March 2015
Rick Stein travels to Sydney to look at the changing Australian food culture, such as the new varieties of fish at the Sydney Fish Market. He also speaks with Neil Perry and a chef who is trained in French and Aboriginal cooking. He then travels to Tasmania where he hunts and tries Wallaby meat, tries the local whiskey and meets a sushi chef.
6	Rachel Khoo	Malaysia	9 March 2015
Rachel Khoo begins in Kuala Lumpur where her at her uncle's home. She discovers the different ethnic groups which populate the area and how each of these cultures affect the food of the area. She travels to Ipoh, particular ACS Ipoh where she looks at the way the students eat and finds pictures of her father. She travels to a small indigenous village to learn how people of the local communities live and how the Malays make their iconic flavouring, blachan. Her final stop is Penang Island, where she stays at the Eastern & Oriental Hotel, learns about the Khoo Kongsi, learns more about freshly made blachan and tries ethnic Malay food.
