= Cyrus Todiwala =

Indian chef

Cyrus Todiwala OBE DL
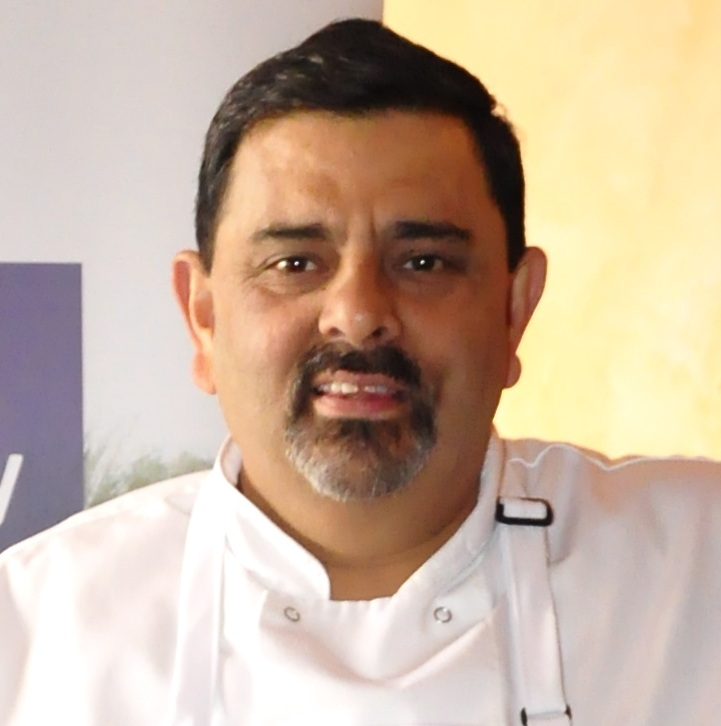
- Born: 16 October 1956 (age 70); Mumbai, India
- Spouse: Pervin Todiwala
- Culinary career
- Cooking style: Parsi cuisine
- Current restaurants
- Café Spice Namasté; Mr Todiwala's Kitchen; The River Restaurant by Cyrus; Assado; “ Mr Todiwala's Petiscos”
- Previous restaurant
- Namasté
- Television shows
- Saturday Kitchen; Market Kitchen
- Awardss
- 2005 Catey Award for Education and Training; 2005 Springboard Awards for Excellence special award; 2012 Craft Guild of Chefs special award
- Website: cafespice.co.uk

Cyrus Rustom Todiwala OBE, DL, (born 16 October 1956), is an Indian chef proprietor of Café Spice Namasté and a celebrity television chef. He trained at the Taj Hotels Resorts and Palaces chain in India, and rose to become executive chef for eleven restaurants within those hotels. He moved to the UK in 1991 with his family, and following some initial financial difficulties after taking over a restaurant, Michael Gottlieb and Martin Jacques through their restaurant Smollensky's provided investment funding, allowing Todiwala to open Café Spice Namasté in 1995, the restaurant for which he is best known.

He has subsequently launched a range of condiments and sauces called Mr Todiwala's, and a second restaurant called Mr Todiwala's Kitchen, which is located at the Hilton at Heathrow Airport near Terminal 5. He was awarded an MBE in 2000, and an OBE in 2009. He has also been awarded an honorary doctorate and been made an honorary professor. In 2012, he cooked for Queen Elizabeth II and Prince Philip, Duke of Edinburgh as part of the Diamond Jubilee celebrations. He has appeared on numerous television and radio programmes, such as the BBC radio 1 Saturday Cook show.

== Biography ==
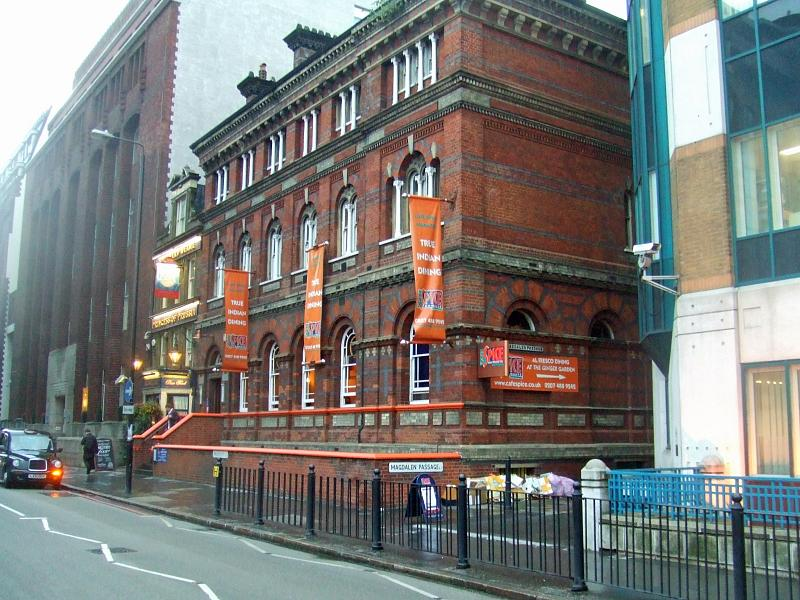
Todiwala's restaurant, Café Spice Namasté, in London

Born and brought up in a Parsi family in Mumbai, India, he lived with his family in a house split into ten flats. His father worked for the Automobile Association as Chief of Road Service for Western India.

Todiwala finished his schooling in Barnes School and then graduated from Sophia Shree B K Somani Polytechnic having studied Hotel Administration and Food Technology. His first job was as a busboy. He trained as a chef with Taj Hotels Resorts and Palaces in India, eventually becoming Executive Chef for all of the chain's hotels in India, some eleven restaurants with 160 staff. He moved to Australia in 1991, and moved to the United Kingdom with his family, having been invited to run a restaurant in Alie Street in London called Namasté, which Todiwala describes as having been "pretty lousy". The owners of the restaurant went into financial difficulty despite critical acclaim for Todiwala's work. Being faced with unemployment whilst on a work visa, he took over the restaurant with the help of his wife, Pervin.

With banks refusing to give him loans, he turned to family members to help support his restaurant. They were given multiple small sums, but won a car in a competition and sold it, enabling them to place a deposit on a new home. However, the Home Office began to be interested in Todiwala's work, as he was a foreign business owner without any investors. At around the same time, Michael Gottlieb, the joint owner of 'Smollensky's' restaurants in London, wished to invest in a new Indian restaurant on E1's Prescott Street and approached The Cobra Good Curry Guide's website editor Pat Chapman seeking a chef. Chapman proposed Todiwala. Café Spice Namasté opened in 1995, although the Home Office would continue to pursue Todiwala for deportation.

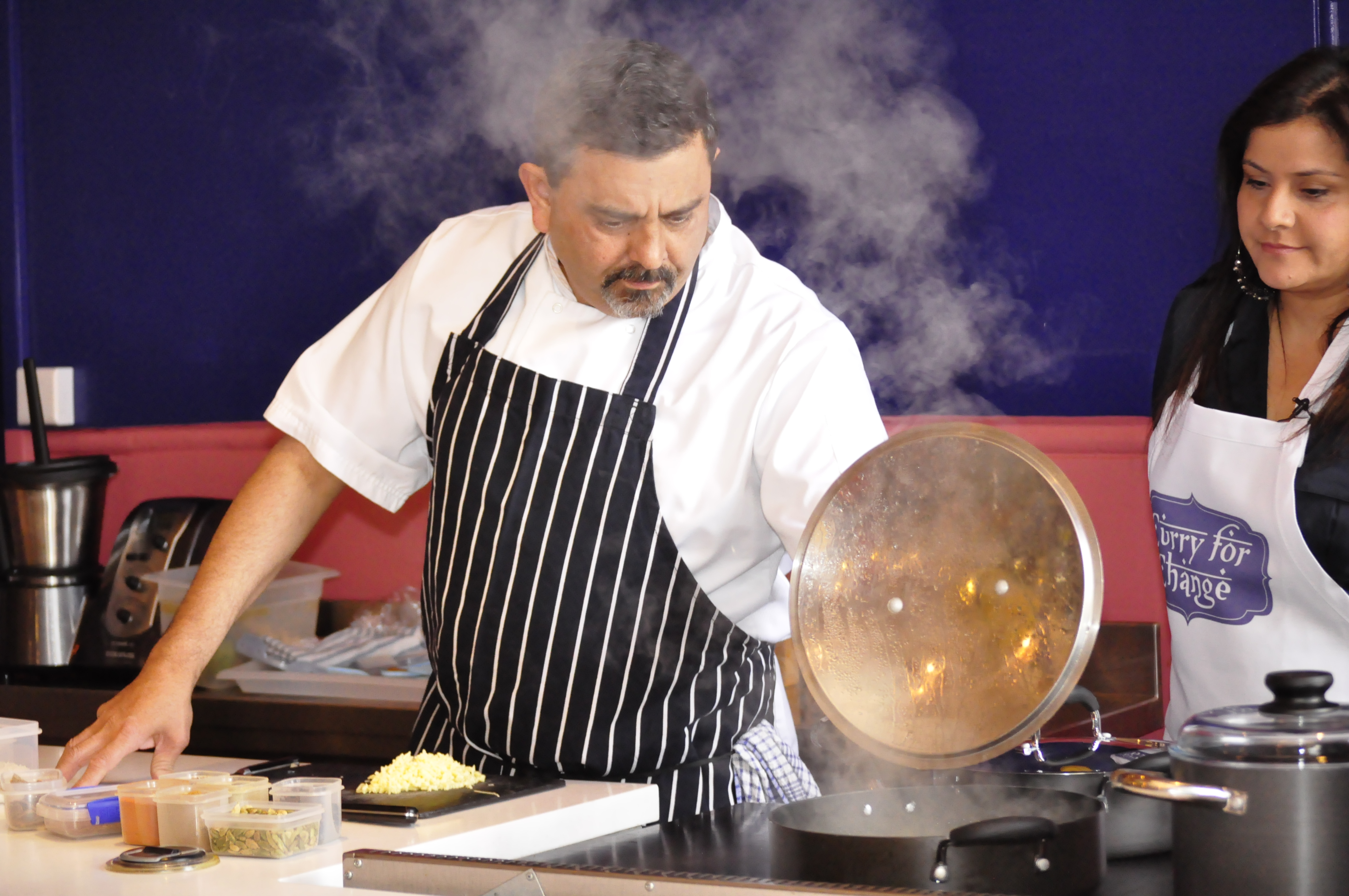
Cyrus Todiwala with actress Nina Wadia, at a charity event in 2012

He has since worked with the National Health Service to create ethnic menus for hospitals alongside Loyd Grossman, and with the London East Training and Enterprise Council to create an Asian and Oriental cooking school with an onsite restaurant so that students could be trained in a real working kitchen. However, the school closed after a few years following a change in funding. While he was facing threats of deportation from the Home Office, he was also on the National Advisory Council for Education and Training Targets alongside former Home Secretary David Blunkett.

In 2006, he opened Café’t’, a coffee shop / restaurant hybrid. He launched a range of cooking sauces under the brand name Mr Todiwala's in 2010, which added to an existing range of pickles and chutneys. In 2011, he launched a new restaurant named Mr Todiwala's Kitchen, which is located within the Hilton Hotel at Heathrow Airport's Terminal 5. He has appeared regularly at Taste Festivals, including those in London and in Dubai.

As part of the Diamond Jubilee of Elizabeth II, Todiwala cooked for the Queen and the Duke of Edinburgh at Krishna Avanti school in Harrow. He cooked a version of Country Captain using rare breed mutton from North Ronaldsay in the Orkney Islands. The dish has since been added to the menu at Café Spice Namaste.

In December 2014, after having established four premiere restaurants in London, Cyrus returned to India to establish The River Restaurant, his first restaurant in India, at the Acron Waterfront Resort in Baga on the banks of the Baga river in Goa.

In 2017 Todiwala became the Rare Breeds Survival Trust (RBST)'s first ever chef ambassador. This role enables Todiwala to combine his interests in food and conservation.

=== Awards ===
In 2000, Todiwala was awarded an MBE for services to the restaurant and catering industry. He was subsequently appointed an OBE in the 2010 New Year's Honours List. He was given a special award at the Craft Guild of Chefs awards in 2012 for "outstanding contribution to the industry". He has subsequently become a judge for The Catey Awards.

He has long been a proponent of staff training, and earned an Investors in People for Café Spice Namasté. This training approach also saw him awarded an Education and Training Catey award in 2005. Also in 2005, he won the special award at the Springboard Awards for Excellence.

In 2009, he was given an honorary doctorate by London Metropolitan University. He was also made an honorary professor of Thames Valley University and a Deputy Lieutenant of Greater London. He was also named in the foodie section of the Evening Standard's list of London's one thousand most influential people in 2010. This saw him listed alongside other chefs such as Gordon Ramsay, Heston Blumenthal and Jamie Oliver. He was first listed in Who's Who in 2011.

=== Television and radio work ===
Todiwala regularly appears on cooking television shows such as BBC One's Saturday Kitchen, UKTV Food's Market Kitchen, ITV's Daybreak and Channel 4's Drop Down Menu. On radio, he has appeared in slots on channels such as the BBC Radio stations Radio 4, Radio 5 Live, and the BBC World Service.

In 2013 Todiwala partnered with Tony Singh to present their own cookery show on BBC Two, The Incredible Spice Men: Todiwala And Singh.

He has also appeared on "Britain's Natural World: Unnatural History of London" discussing his love of British birds.

In 2018 Todiwala appeared on BBC Ones's of Royal Recipes to recreate the pudding that was served by him on Queens Diamond Jubilee function.

== Personal life ==
Cyrus is married to Pervin. The two met at the Taj Mahal hotel in Mumbai. They have two sons together, and it was Pervin's idea for the family to move to the UK in 1991.

He aims to use sustainable materials in his restaurants, including agriculture. Todiwala believes in the medicinal effects of spices. He would phone his father in India to look up details of spices in a book written in Gujarati. After his father died at the age of 97, the book passed into his care but he has since found the language too difficult to read clearly. While he states that his favourite type of cuisine is Parsi, he will eat anything although aubergines give him indigestion.
