= Greywalls =

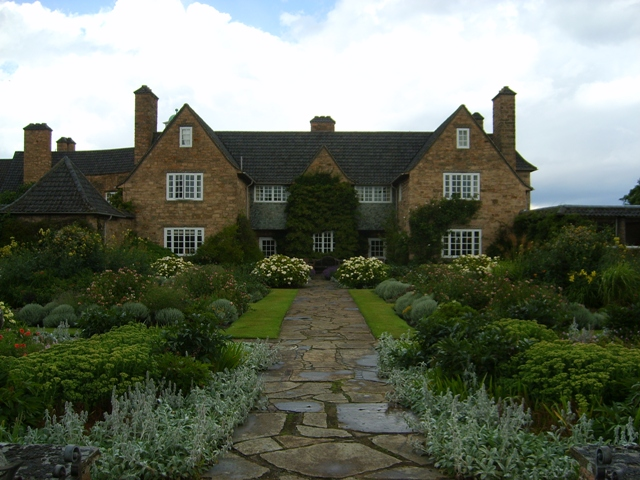
- South façade of Greywalls

- Location of Greywalls in East Lothian
- 56.0422°N 2.8194°W
- Location: Gullane, East Lothian, Scotland, United Kingdom

History
- Built: 1901
- Built for: Alfred Lyttelton

Site notes
- Architect: Sir Edwin Lutyens

Listed Building – Category A
- Designated: 5 February 1971
- Reference no.: LB1337

Inventory of Gardens and Designed Landscapes in Scotland
- Official name: Grey Walls (High Walls)
- Designated: 1 July 1987
- Reference no.: GDL00204

Greywalls is an Edwardian country house at Gullane in East Lothian, Scotland. It was built in 1901 for Alfred Lyttelton, to designs by Sir Edwin Lutyens. It has been run as a hotel since 1948. Greywalls is protected as a category A listed building, and the grounds are included on the Inventory of Gardens and Designed Landscapes in Scotland, the national listing of significant gardens.

== History ==
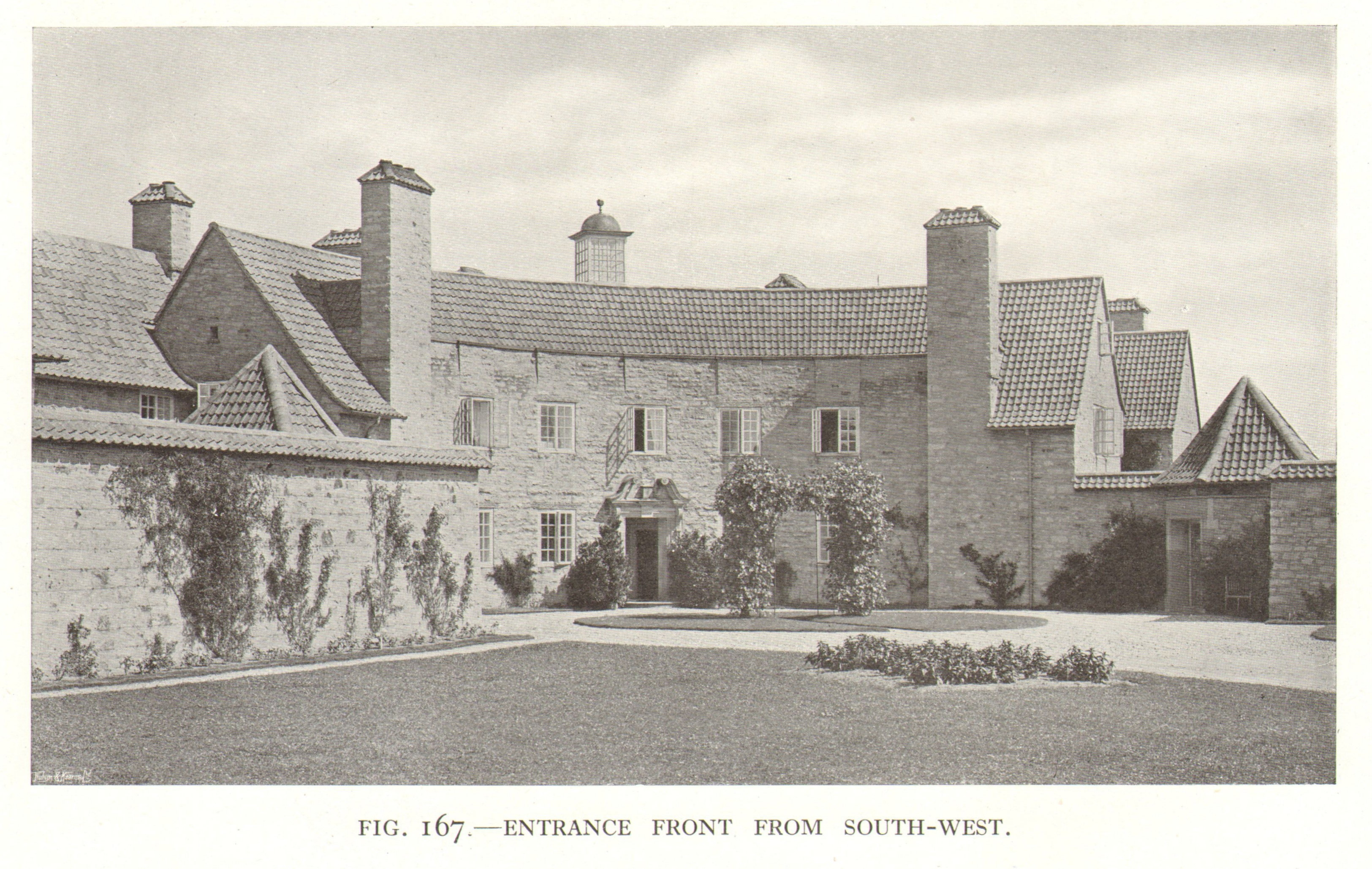
Greywalls from the South-West, photo published in 1913

The Hon. Alfred Lyttelton (1857–1913) served as a Member of Parliament from 1895 to 1913, holding office as Colonial Secretary from 1903 to 1905. He was also a talented sportsman, having previously played on the English national cricket and football teams. A keen golfer, in 1901 he commissioned the architect Edwin Lutyens to design a holiday home on a site adjacent to Muirfield golf course on the East Lothian coast. Originally known as High Walls, the house was designed in Lutyens' Arts and Crafts style. Lutyens also laid out the gardens, possibly with the assistance of Gertrude Jekyll.

In 1905 the house was sold by Lyttelton to Evelyn Forbes, the Scots socialite wife of American railroad magnate William Dodge James. She commissioned Lutyens to add three lodges in 1905, and in 1911 had an extension built by Sir Robert Lorimer. The Jameses entertained Edward VII at the house. It was leased after the First World War, and in 1924 it was purchased by Sir James Horlick, founder of Horlicks Ltd. Horlick developed a plant collection at another of his properties, Achamore House in Argyll, but only visited Greywalls annually.

The house was requisitioned during the Second World War for use as a hospital. Horlick left the property to his daughter Ursula and her husband Colonel John Weaver, and in 1948 they converted the house into a hotel. Several extensions have since been added, and the Weaver family continue to manage the property. The hotel restaurant, Chez Roux, is run by French chef Albert Roux.
