= Orchid (charity) =

British charity that funds cancer research

Orchid is a British charity which funds research into the diagnosis, prevention and treatment of prostate, penile and testicular cancer and promotes awareness about these diseases. It was set up in 1996 by former testicular cancer sufferer, Colin Osborne.

== See also ==
- Cancer in the United Kingdom
