= Craft Guild of Chefs =

Coordinates: 51.4757°N 0.2862°W

- Formation: 1885; 141 years ago
- Type: Professional membership body
- Purpose: Leading Chefs’ Association in the UK.
- Headquarters: 1 Victoria Parade, Richmond, London
- Chairman: Mark Reynolds
- Chief Executive: Andrew Green
- Website: craftguildofchefs.org

The Craft Guild of Chefs is the main professional association for chefs in the UK.

== History ==
Established in 1885 under its former name of the Cookery and Food Association, it is sited near Kew Gardens station in the London Borough of Richmond upon Thames. It holds the annual National Chef of the Year awards.

== Graduate Awards ==
Craft Guild of Chefs host its Graduate Awards at the University College Birmingham.

== See also ==
- Channel Islands cuisine
