= Athletics at the 1995 Pan American Games – Men's 110 metres hurdles =

Men's 110 metres hurdles at the Pan American Games

The men's 110 metres hurdles event at the 1995 Pan American Games was held at the Estadio Atletico "Justo Roman" on 19 and 21 March.

== Medalists ==
Gold	Silver	Bronze
Roger Kingdom; United States	Emilio Valle; Cuba	Courtney Hawkins; United States

== Results ==
=== Heats ===
Wind:
Heat 1: -2.0 m/s, Heat 2: -2.1 m/s

Rank	Heat	Name	Nationality	Time	Notes
1	2	Courtney Hawkins	United States	13.70	Q
2	1	Roger Kingdom	United States	13.79	Q
3	2	Erik Batte	Cuba	13.86	Q
4	1	Emilio Valle	Cuba	14.05	Q
5	2	Miguel Soto	Puerto Rico	14.18	Q
6	2	Wagner Marseille	Haiti	14.29	q
7	1	Matthew Love	Jamaica	14.38	Q
8	2	Walmes de Souza	Brazil	14.47	q
9	1	Arturo Rodríguez	Chile	14.56	
10	1	Ricardo D'Andrilli	Argentina	14.63	
11	2	Oscar Ratto	Argentina	14.84	
12	1	Emerson Perin	Brazil	14.96	
13	2	Marco Mina	Peru	15.08	
14	1	Jerome Williams	Bahamas	15.15	

=== Final ===
Wind: +0.8 m/s

Rank	Lane	Name	Nationality	Time	Notes
1st place, gold medalist(s)	3	Roger Kingdom	United States	13.39	
2nd place, silver medalist(s)	5	Emilio Valle	Cuba	13.40	
3rd place, bronze medalist(s)	6	Courtney Hawkins	United States	13.54	
4	4	Erik Batte	Cuba	13.72	
5	8	Walmes de Souza	Brazil	14.03	
6	2	Miguel Soto	Puerto Rico	14.09	
7	1	Matthew Love	Jamaica	14.16	
8	7	Wagner Marseille	Haiti	14.30	
