= 1994 Ibero-American Championships in Athletics =

VI Ibero-American Championships
- Dates: 27 – 30 October
- Host city: Mar del Plata, Argentina
- Venue: Estadio José María Minella
- Events: 42
- Participation: 346 athletes from 22 nations
- Records set: 4 championship records

The 1994 Ibero-American Championships in Athletics (Spanish: VI Campeonato Iberoamericano de Atletismo) was the sixth edition of the international athletics competition between Ibero-American nations which was held at the Estadio José María Minella in Mar del Plata, Argentina from 27–30 October.

The competition marked the inauguration of a newly built track at the host stadium, which was part of Mar del Plata's developments for the 1995 Pan American Games. Due to its late scheduling in the annual track and field season, the competition did not attract some of the region's top athletes – Cuba, Portugal and Spain all sent less than full strength delegations. As a result, Brazil topped the medal table for the second time in Ibero-American history, taking eleven gold medals and 32 in total. Cuba were the next best performers with eight golds in their haul of 20 medals, while Colombia came third, having won seven events and 17 medals overall. The hosts, Argentina, were fourth with four golds and fifteen medals in total.

Four new championship records were set at the 1994 edition. Ronaldo da Costa improved the men's 5000 metres record, but was beaten in the 10,000 metres by Armando Quintanilla, who took over half a minute off the previous record. Andrés Charadía bettered a men's hammer throw record, while María Eugenia Villamizar set a new standard in the inaugural women's hammer event. Sueli dos Santos won the women's javelin with a South American record throw, but this mark was later removed as she was disqualified for doping.

Outside of these performances, the standard of competition was lower than at previous editions. Carlos Gats won the men's 100 metres with a slow, wind-assisted time of 10.50 seconds to become the first Argentine to win an international 100 m race since Gerardo Bönnhoff in 1947. Sebastián Keitel of Chile completed a men's 200/400 m double, while Colombia's Ximena Restrepo achieved the same feat and also won in both relays, taking four gold medals from the championships. Andrea Ávila won golds in the women's long jump and triple jump and went on to medal in both the horizontal jumps at the 1995 Pan American Games. Brazilian Silvana Pereira also won two golds, taking the titles in both the long-distance track events.

== Medal summary ==
=== Men ===
Event	Gold		Silver		Bronze	
100 metres (Wind: +3.3 m/s)	Carlos Gats (ARG)	10.50 w	Jaime Barragán (MEX)	10.52 w	Jorge Aguilera (CUB)	10.56 w
200 metres	Sebastián Keitel (CHI)	20.43	Carlos Gats (ARG)	20.51	Leonardo Prevost (CUB)	20.61
400 metres	Sebastián Keitel (CHI)	46.72	Sidnei Telles de Souza (BRA)	47.50	Guillermo Cacián (ARG)	47.88
800 metres	José de Oliveira (BRA)	1:49.49	Pablo Squella (CHI)	1:49.50	Edimilson da Silva (BRA)	1:49.91
1500 metres	José López (VEN)	3:54.04	Amado Ramos (CUB)	3:54.17	Antonio Herrador (ESP)	3:54.22
5000 metres	Ronaldo da Costa (BRA)	13:47.99 CR	Martín Pitayo (MEX)	13:50.31	Raimundo Santos (POR)	13:51.15
10,000 metres	Armando Quintanilla (MEX)	28:06.88 CR	Ronaldo da Costa (BRA)	28:18.26	Jorge Marquez (MEX)	28:24.03
110 m hurdles	Erik Batte (CUB)	14.31	Walmes de Souza (BRA)	14.33	Miguel de los Santos (ESP)	14.47
400 m hurdles	Everson Teixeira (BRA)	49.76	Juan Gutiérrez (MEX)	50.31	Eronilde de Araújo (BRA)	50.36
3000 m steeplechase	Javier Rodríguez (ESP)	8:35.03	Rubén García (MEX)	8:36.81	Inocencio López (ESP)	8:41.22
4×100 m relay	Cuba (CUB); Jorge Aguilera; Leonardo Prevost; Andrés Simón; Joel Lamela	39.99	Brazil (BRA); Marcelo da Silva; Sidnei Telles de Souza; Claudinei da Silva; Walmes de Souza	40.53	Colombia (COL); Robinson Urrutia; Wenceslao Ferrín; Luis Vega; José Humberto Rivas	40.79
4×400 m relay	Brazil (BRA); Sidnei Telles de Souza; Clóvis Fernandes; Ediélson Rocha Tenorio; Eronilde de Araújo	3:06.54	Mexico (MEX); Raymundo Escalante; Juan Vallín; Luis Karim Toledo; Alejandro Cárdenas	3:07.75	Colombia (COL); Robinson Urrutia; Llimi Rivas; Luis Vega; Wenceslao Ferrín	3:08.24
20,000 m walk	Daniel García (MEX)	1:21:19.92	Querubín Moreno (COL)	1:21:37.17	Héctor Moreno (COL)	1:21:49.90
High jump	Gilmar Mayo (COL)	2.32 m	Marino Drake (CUB)	2.26 m	Fernando Moreno (ARG)	2.20 m
Pole vault	Nuno Fernandes (POR)	5.15 m	Miguel Berrío (CUB)	5.10 m	Françesc Mas (ESP)	5.00 m
Long jump	Jaime Jefferson (CUB)	7.82 m (w)	Paulo de Oliveira (BRA)	7.77 m	Rogelio Sáenz (MEX)	7.73 m (w)
Triple jump	Anísio Silva (BRA)	16.66 m	Daniel Osorio (CUB)	16.39 m (w)	Freddy Nieves (ECU)	15.98 m
Shot put	Gert Weil (CHI)	19.30 m	Manuel Martínez (ESP)	18.70 m	Adilson Oliveira (BRA)	17.77 m
Discus throw	Ramón Jiménez Gaona (PAR)	60.42 m	João dos Santos (BRA)	59.20 m	Marcelo Pugliese (ARG)	59.18 m
Hammer throw	Andrés Charadía (ARG)	70.80 m CR	Guillermo Guzmán (MEX)	67.74 m	Eladio Hernández (CUB)	66.90 m
Javelin throw	Luis Lucumí (COL)	75.40 m	Julián Sotelo (ESP)	73.88 m	Martín Castillo (MEX)	69.36 m
Decathlon	Mário Aníbal (POR)	7431 pts (w)	Miguel Valle (CUB)	7340 pts (w)	José de Assis (BRA)	7072 pts (w)

=== Women ===
Event	Gold		Silver		Bronze	
100 metres	Cleide Amaral (BRA)	11.66	Mirtha Brock (COL)	11.78	Lisette Rondón (CHI)	11.89
200 metres (Wind: +4.4 m/s)	Ximena Restrepo (COL)	23.07 w	Lisette Rondón (CHI)	23.69 w	Kátia Regina de Jesus Santos (BRA)	23.77 w
400 metres	Ximena Restrepo (COL)	52.69	Odalmis Limonta (CUB)	54.54	Elia Mera (COL)	55.33
800 metres	Fátima dos Santos (BRA)	2:06.26	Odalmis Limonta (CUB)	2:07.26	Marta Orellana (ARG)	2:07.29
1500 metres	Ana de Souza (BRA)	4:28.50	Mireya Ailhaud (MEX)	4:30.20	Mabel Arrúa (ARG)	4:35.84
3000 metres	Silvana Pereira (BRA)	9:14.53	Lucía Mendiola (MEX)	9:17.19	Yesenia Centeno (CUB)	9:21.55
10,000 metres	Silvana Pereira (BRA)	33:29.60	Lucía Rendón (MEX)	33:48.32	Stella Castro (COL)	34:04.27
100 m hurdles (Wind: +3.3 m/s)	Damaris Anderson (CUB)	13.81 w	Verónica Depaoli (ARG)	13.90 w	Carmen Bezanilla (CHI)	14.01 w
400 m hurdles	Odalys Hernández (CUB)	57.89	Flor Robledo (COL)	59.09	Marise da Silva (BRA)	59.21
4×100 m relay	Colombia (COL); Elia Mera; Ximena Restrepo; Patricia Rodríguez; Mirtha Brock	44.87	Brazil (BRA); Cleide Amaral; Kátia Regina de Jesus Santos; Vânia dos Santos; Tatiana Orcy	46.03	Chile (CHI); Carmen Gloria Bezanilla; Lisette Rondón; Marcela Barros; Mónica Castro	46.22
4×400 m relay	Colombia (COL); Patricia Rodríguez; Elia Mera; Flor Robledo; Ximena Restrepo	3:35.35	Brazil (BRA); Maria Magnólia Figueiredo; Rosângela de Souza Oliveira; Edinilza Ferreira de Lima; Marlene Moreira da Silva	3:38.61	Chile (CHI); Marcela Barros; Lisette Rondón; Carmen Gloria Bezanilla; Sara Montecinos	3:41.40
10,000 m walk	Francisca Martínez (MEX)	47:01.80	Miriam Ramón (ECU)	47:01.83	Liliana Bermeo (COL)	47:06.76
High jump	Dania Fernández (CUB)	1.75 m	Luciane Dambacher (BRA)	1.75 m	Orlane dos Santos (BRA)	1.75 m
Long jump	Andrea Ávila (ARG)	6.58 m	Luciana dos Santos (BRA)	6.18 m	Alejandra García (ARG)	6.13 m
Triple jump	Andrea Ávila (ARG)	13.18 m	Luciana dos Santos (BRA)	12.90 m (w)	Maria de Souza (BRA)	12.86 m (w)
Shot put	Herminia Fernández (CUB)	17.33 m	Elisângela Adriano (BRA)	16.77 m	Margarita Ramos (ESP)	16.39 m
Discus throw	Teresa Machado (POR)	61.20 m	Liliana Martinelli (ARG)	56.18 m	Amélia Moreira (BRA)	54.06 m
Hammer throw	María Eugenia Villamizar (COL)	55.70 m CR	Zulma Lambert (ARG)	51.66 m	Karina Moya (ARG)	50.56 m
Javelin throw	Sueli dos Santos (BRA)	65.96 m ^{†}	Sonia Bisset (CUB)	57.70 m	Idoia Mariezkurrena (ESP)	49.90 m
Heptathlon	Yolaida Pompa (CUB)	5370 pts	Zorobabelia Córdoba (COL)	5234 pts	Inma Clopés (ESP)	5173 pts

- ^{†} = Sueli dos Santos's javelin throw of 65.96 m was a championship and South American record, but this was later annulled due to a doping infraction in the months following the tournament. The Ibero-American Athletic Association did not retrospectively adjust or re-issue the women's javelin medals.

== Medal table ==
* Host nation (Argentina)

Rank	Nation	Gold	Silver	Bronze	Total
1	Brazil	11	12	9	32
2	Cuba	8	8	4	20
3	Colombia	7	4	6	17
4	Argentina*	4	4	7	15
5	Mexico	3	9	2	14
6	Chile	3	2	4	9
7	Portugal	3	0	1	4
8	Spain	1	2	7	10
9	Paraguay	1	0	0	1
9	Venezuela	1	0	0	1
11	Ecuador	0	1	2	3
Totals (11 entries)		42	42	42	126

== Participation ==
Twenty-two nations of the Asociación Iberoamericana de Atletismo sent delegations to the 1994 championships. A total of 346 athletes took part in the competition. However, only 299 participating athletes were counted by analysing the official result list. The higher number probably contains coaches and/or officials registered for the event.

- Argentina (49)
- Bolivia (4)
- Brazil (47)
- Chile (18)
- Colombia (18)
- Costa Rica (1)
- Cuba (29)
- Dominican Republic (1)
- Ecuador (6)
- El Salvador (1)
- Guatemala (5)
- Honduras (1)
- Mexico (36)
- Nicaragua (1)
- Panama (1)
- Paraguay (4)
- Peru (13)
- Portugal (11)
- Puerto Rico (4)
- Spain (25)
- Uruguay (19)
- Venezuela (5)
