= Athletics at the 1996 Summer Olympics – Men's 110 metres hurdles =

Men's 110 metres hurdles at the Games of the XXVI Olympiad
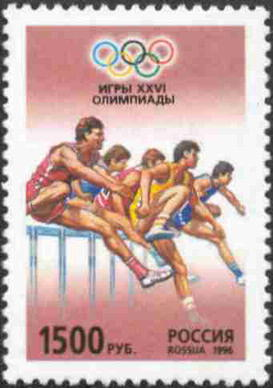
- Russian stamp commemorating hurdling at the 1996 Games
- Venue: Centennial Olympic Stadium
- Date: 28 & 29 July
- Competitors: 62 from 39 nations
- Winning time: 12.95 OR

Medalists
1st place, gold medalist(s)		Allen Johnson; United States
2nd place, silver medalist(s)		Mark Crear; United States
3rd place, bronze medalist(s)		Florian Schwarthoff; Germany

Official Video Highlights @ 1:49:32

The men's 110 metres hurdles was an event at the 1996 Summer Olympics in Atlanta, Georgia. The final was held on July 29, 1996. Sixty-two athletes from 39 nations competed. The maximum number of athletes per nation had been set at 3 since the 1930 Olympic Congress. The event was won by Allen Johnson of the United States, the nation's 18th title in the event. Florian Schwarthoff's bronze was the first medal in the event for Germany, though East Germany had won gold in 1980.

== Background ==
This was the 23rd appearance of the event, which is one of 12 athletics events to have been held at every Summer Olympics. Five finalists from 1992 returned: gold medalist Mark McKoy (then of Canada, now of Austria), fourth-place finisher Tony Jarrett of Great Britain, fifth-place finisher Florian Schwarthoff of Germany, sixth-place finisher Emilio Valle of Cuba, and seventh-place finisher Colin Jackson of Great Britain. McKoy, Jarrett, and Jackson had all been finalists in 1988 as well, with Jackson taking silver in Seoul. Jackson was favored to return to the podium and possibly win; he had taken the 1993 world, 1990 and 1994 European, and 1990 and 1994 Commonwealth championships and broken the world record in 1993. His main competition was Allen Johnson of the United States, the 1995 world champion.

Cape Verde, Cyprus, the Czech Republic, Ghana, Haiti, Kyrgyzstan, Russia, Slovakia, Sri Lanka, and Uzbekistan each made their first appearance in the event. The United States made its 22nd appearance, most of any nation (having missed only the boycotted 1980 Games).

== Competition format ==
The competition used the four-round format previously used in 1960 and since 1988, still using the eight-man semifinals and finals used since 1964. The "fastest loser" system, also introduced in 1964, was used in the first round.

The first round consisted of eight heats, with 8 hurdlers each (before withdrawals left one heat with only 6). The top three hurdlers in each heat, along with the eight next fastest overall, advanced to the quarterfinals. The 32 quarterfinalists were divided into four heats of 8 hurdlers each, with the top four in each heat advancing. One additional hurdler advanced due to being obstructed. The 17 semifinalists were divided into two semifinals of 8 hurdlers each (with one having an extra due to the obstruction); again, the top four hurdlers in each advanced to the 8-man final.

== Records ==
These were the standing world and Olympic records (in seconds) prior to the 1996 Summer Olympics.

World record	Colin Jackson (GBR)	12.91	Stuttgart, Germany	20 August 1993
Olympic record	Roger Kingdom (USA)	12.98	Seoul, South Korea	28 September 1988

Allen Johnson set a new Olympic record with 12.95 seconds in the final.

== Schedule ==
All times are Eastern Daylight Time (UTC-4)

Date	Time	Round
Sunday, 28 July 1996	10:45; 18:30	Round 1 Quarterfinals
Monday, 29 July 1996	18:20; 20:50	Semifinals; Final

== Results ==
=== Round 1 ===
==== Heat 1 ====
Rank	Lane	Athlete	Nation	Reaction	Time	Notes
1	5	Igor Kováč	Slovakia	0.175	13.62	Q
2	8	Mark McKoy	Austria	0.152	13.70	Q
3	1	Andrey Kislykh	Russia	0.150	13.74	Q
4	6	Claude Edorh	Germany	0.177	13.74	q
5	3	Chen Yanhao	China	0.156	13.76	
6	4	Tomáš Dvořák	Czech Republic	0.146	13.78	
7	2	Mickey Soto	Puerto Rico	0.178	13.94	
8	7	Judex Lefou	Mauritius	0.220	14.69	
				Wind: -0.5 m/s		

==== Heat 2 ====
Rank	Lane	Athlete	Nation	Reaction	Time	Notes
1	7	Florian Schwarthoff	Germany	0.210	13.39	Q
2	8	Erik Batte	Cuba	0.222	13.47	Q
3	3	Andy Tulloch	Great Britain	0.160	13.56	Q
4	5	Johan Lisabeth	Belgium	0.166	13.72	q
5	2	Claes Albihn	Sweden	0.152	13.79	
6	1	Moses Oyiki	Nigeria	0.148	14.04	
7	4	Sean Cahill	Ireland	0.144	14.28	
8	6	Yury Aristov	Uzbekistan	0.200	15.04	
				Wind: +0.2 m/s		

==== Heat 3 ====
Rank	Lane	Athlete	Nation	Reaction	Time	Notes
1	1	Mark Crear	United States	0.221	13.44	Q
2	6	Anier García	Cuba	0.159	13.56	Q
3	8	Sven Pieters	Belgium	0.164	13.56	Q
4	3	Gheorghe Boroi	Romania	0.128	13.66	q
5	5	Emerson Perin	Brazil	0.181	13.76	
6	2	Wagner Marseille	Haiti	0.157	13.95	
7	7	Herwig Röttl	Austria	0.166	14.08	
8	4	Fawaz Ismail Johar	Bahrain	0.167	14.32	
				Wind: +1.0 m/s		

==== Heat 4 ====
Rank	Lane	Athlete	Nation	Reaction	Time	Notes
1	8	Colin Jackson	Great Britain	0.140	13.36	Q
2	5	Eric Kaiser	Germany	0.178	13.64	Q
3	3	Guntis Peders	Latvia	0.143	13.72	Q
4	4	Frank Boateng	Ghana	0.211	13.87	
5	7	William Erese	Nigeria	0.171	13.98	
6	6	Joe Naivalu	Fiji	0.156	14.23	
—	2	Nur Herman Majid	Malaysia	DNS		
—	1	Curt Young	Panama	DNS		
				Wind: -0.1 m/s		

==== Heat 5 ====
Rank	Lane	Athlete	Nation	Reaction	Time	Notes
1	6	Allen Johnson	United States	0.172	13.66	Q
2	4	Krzysztof Mehlich	Poland	0.200	13.81	Q
3	3	Walmes de Souza	Brazil	0.192	13.82	Q
4	8	Stelios Bisbas	Greece	0.182	13.85	
5	5	Antti Haapakoski	Finland	0.152	13.90	
6	7	Miguel de los Santos	Spain	0.161	14.01	
7	1	Steve Adegbite	Nigeria	0.161	14.06	
—	2	Henry Andrade	Cape Verde	0.178	DNF	
				Wind: +0.3 m/s		

==== Heat 6 ====
Rank	Lane	Athlete	Nation	Reaction	Time	Notes
1	7	Tony Jarrett	Great Britain	0.149	13.47	Q
2	1	Vincent Clarico	France	0.177	13.52	Q
3	8	Thomas Kearns	Ireland	0.169	13.67	Q
4	6	Pedro Chiamulera	Brazil	0.160	13.70	q
5	5	Evgeny Pechonkin	Russia	0.150	13.86	
6	2	Elmar Lichtenegger	Austria	0.184	14.03	
7	4	Prodromos Katsantonis	Cyprus	0.176	14.34	
8	3	Hakim Mazou	Republic of the Congo	0.193	14.52	
				Wind: +0.2 m/s		

==== Heat 7 ====
Rank	Lane	Athlete	Nation	Reaction	Time	Notes
1	5	Kyle Vander Kuyp	Australia	0.156	13.32	Q
2	8	Emilio Valle	Cuba	0.183	13.35	Q
3	6	Jonathan Nsenga	Belgium	0.169	13.61	Q
4	4	Igors Kazanovs	Latvia	0.145	13.74	q
5	2	Tim Kroeker	Canada	0.188	13.74	q
6	7	Jesús Font	Spain	0.172	13.90	
7	3	Mahesh Perera	Sri Lanka	0.201	14.24	
8	1	José Riesco	Peru	0.168	14.29	
				Wind: +2.3 m/s		

==== Heat 8 ====
Rank	Lane	Athlete	Nation	Reaction	Time	Notes
1	2	Eugene Swift	United States	0.161	13.36	Q
2	3	Li Tong	China	0.156	13.57	Q
3	6	Robert Foster	Jamaica	0.169	13.58	Q
4	7	Levente Csillag	Hungary	0.185	13.64	q
5	5	Emmanuel Romary	France	0.161	13.68	q
6	4	Carlos Sala	Spain	0.153	13.94	
7	8	Yeniya Shorokhov	Kyrgyzstan	0.179	14.29	
8	1	Paul Tucker	Guyana	0.184	14.65	
				Wind: +2.8 m/s		

==== Overall results for round 1 ====
Rank	Heat	Athlete	Nation	Time	Notes
1	7	Kyle Vander Kuyp	Australia	13.32	Q
2	7	Emilio Valle	Cuba	13.35	Q
3	4	Colin Jackson	Great Britain	13.36	Q
3	8	Eugene Swift	United States	13.36	Q
5	2	Florian Schwarthoff	Germany	13.39	Q
6	3	Mark Crear	United States	13.44	Q
7	2	Erik Batte	Cuba	13.47	Q
7	6	Tony Jarrett	Great Britain	13.47	Q
9	6	Vincent Clarico	France	13.52	Q
10	2	Andy Tulloch	Great Britain	13.56	Q
10	3	Anier García	Cuba	13.56	Q
10	3	Sven Pieters	Belgium	13.56	Q
13	8	Li Tong	China	13.57	Q
14	8	Robert Foster	Jamaica	13.58	Q
15	7	Jonathan Nsenga	Belgium	13.61	Q
16	1	Igor Kováč	Slovakia	13.62	Q
17	4	Eric Kaiser	Germany	13.64	Q
17	8	Levente Csillag	Hungary	13.64	q
19	3	Gheorghe Boroi	Romania	13.66	q
19	5	Allen Johnson	United States	13.66	Q
21	6	Thomas Kearns	Ireland	13.67	Q
22	8	Emmanuel Romary	France	13.68	q
23	1	Mark McKoy	Austria	13.70	Q
23	6	Pedro Chiamulera	Brazil	13.70	q
25	2	Johan Lisabeth	Belgium	13.72	q
25	4	Guntis Peders	Latvia	13.72	Q
27	1	Andrey Kislykh	Russia	13.74	Q
27	1	Claude Edorh	Germany	13.74	q
27	7	Igors Kazanovs	Latvia	13.74	q
27	7	Tim Kroeker	Canada	13.74	q
31	1	Chen Yanhao	China	13.76	
31	3	Emerson Perin	Brazil	13.76	
33	1	Tomáš Dvořák	Czech Republic	13.78	
34	2	Claes Albihn	Sweden	13.79	
35	5	Krzysztof Mehlich	Poland	13.81	Q
36	5	Walmes de Souza	Brazil	13.82	Q
37	5	Stelios Bisbas	Greece	13.85	
38	6	Evgeny Pechonkin	Russia	13.86	
39	4	Frank Boateng	Ghana	13.87	
40	5	Antti Haapakoski	Finland	13.90	
40	7	Jesús Font	Spain	13.90	
42	1	Mickey Soto	Puerto Rico	13.94	
42	8	Carlos Sala	Spain	13.94	
44	3	Wagner Marseille	Haiti	13.95	
45	4	William Erese	Nigeria	13.98	
46	5	Miguel de los Santos	Spain	14.01	
47	6	Elmar Lichtenegger	Austria	14.03	
48	2	Moses Oyiki	Nigeria	14.04	
49	5	Steve Adegbite	Nigeria	14.06	
50	3	Herwig Röttl	Austria	14.08	
51	4	Joe Naivalu	Fiji	14.23	
52	7	Mahesh Perera	Sri Lanka	14.24	
53	2	Sean Cahill	Ireland	14.28	
54	7	José Riesco	Peru	14.29	
54	8	Yeniya Shorokhov	Kyrgyzstan	14.29	
56	3	Fawaz Ismail Johar	Bahrain	14.32	
57	6	Prodromos Katsantonis	Cyprus	14.34	
58	6	Hakim Mazou	Republic of the Congo	14.52	
59	8	Paul Tucker	Guyana	14.65	
60	1	Judex Lefou	Mauritius	14.69	
61	2	Yury Aristov	Uzbekistan	15.04	
—	5	Henry Andrade	Cape Verde	DNF	
—	4	Nur Herman Majid	Malaysia	DNS	
—	4	Curt Young	Panama	DNS	

=== Quarterfinals ===
==== Quarterfinal 1 ====
Jarrett's obstruction of Kaiser resulted in Jarrett being disqualified and Kaiser advancing to the semifinals despite not finishing the race.

Rank	Lane	Athlete	Nation	Reaction	Time	Notes
1	6	Eugene Swift	United States	0.155	13.37	Q
2	7	Robert Foster	Jamaica	0.156	13.51	Q
3	8	Johan Lisabeth	Belgium	0.156	13.53	Q
4	5	Vincent Clarico	France	0.167	13.57	Q
5	2	Guntis Peders	Latvia	0.151	13.59	
6	1	Pedro Chiamulera	Brazil	0.176	13.77	
—	3	Eric Kaiser	Germany	0.149	DNF	q
—	4	Tony Jarrett	Great Britain	0.139	DSQ	R163.2
				Wind: +1.2 m/s		

==== Quarterfinal 2 ====
Rank	Lane	Athlete	Nation	Reaction	Time	Notes
1	5	Mark Crear	United States	0.127	13.14	Q
2	4	Florian Schwarthoff	Germany	0.165	13.27	Q
3	1	Igors Kazanovs	Latvia	0.139	13.42	Q
4	6	Li Tong	China	0.180	13.43	Q
5	2	Thomas Kearns	Ireland	0.119	13.55	
6	3	Anier García	Cuba	0.164	13.58	
7	8	Jonathan Nsenga	Belgium	0.176	13.63	
8	7	Emmanuel Romary	France	0.173	13.81	
				Wind: +1.1 m/s		

==== Quarterfinal 3 ====
Rank	Lane	Athlete	Nation	Reaction	Time	Notes
1	3	Colin Jackson	Great Britain	0.126	13.33	Q
2	8	Sven Pieters	Belgium	0.160	13.36	Q
3	4	Erik Batte	Cuba	0.208	13.46	Q
4	2	Gheorghe Boroi	Romania	0.149	13.56	Q
5	6	Mark McKoy	Austria	0.166	13.64	
6	1	Claude Edorh	Germany	0.170	13.64	
7	5	Igor Kováč	Slovakia	0.190	13.70	
8	7	Andrey Kislykh	Russia	0.145	13.74	
				Wind: +1.4 m/s		

==== Quarterfinal 4 ====
Rank	Lane	Athlete	Nation	Reaction	Time	Notes
1	3	Allen Johnson	United States	0.173	13.27	Q
2	5	Emilio Valle	Cuba	0.198	13.29	Q
3	4	Kyle Vander Kuyp	Australia	0.152	13.49	Q
4	6	Krzysztof Mehlich	Poland	0.183	13.51	Q
5	8	Levente Csillag	Hungary	0.147	13.61	
6	2	Andy Tulloch	Great Britain	0.169	13.68	
7	1	Walmes de Souza	Brazil	0.214	14.12	
8	7	Tim Kroeker	Canada	0.168	14.14	
				Wind: +0.1 m/s		

==== Overall results for quarterfinals ====
Rank	Heat	Athlete	Nation	Time	Notes
1	2	Mark Crear	United States	13.14	Q
2	2	Florian Schwarthoff	Germany	13.27	Q
2	4	Allen Johnson	United States	13.27	Q
4	4	Emilio Valle	Cuba	13.29	Q
5	3	Colin Jackson	Great Britain	13.33	Q
6	3	Sven Pieters	Belgium	13.36	Q
7	1	Eugene Swift	United States	13.37	Q
8	2	Igors Kazanovs	Latvia	13.42	Q
9	2	Li Tong	China	13.43	Q
10	3	Erik Batte	Cuba	13.46	Q
11	4	Kyle Vander Kuyp	Australia	13.49	Q
12	1	Robert Foster	Jamaica	13.51	Q
12	4	Krzysztof Mehlich	Poland	13.51	Q
14	1	Johan Lisabeth	Belgium	13.53	Q
15	2	Thomas Kearns	Ireland	13.55	
16	3	Gheorghe Boroi	Romania	13.56	Q
17	1	Vincent Clarico	France	13.57	Q
18	2	Anier García	Cuba	13.58	
19	1	Guntis Peders	Latvia	13.59	
20	4	Levente Csillag	Hungary	13.61	
21	2	Jonathan Nsenga	Belgium	13.63	
22	3	Mark McKoy	Austria	13.64	
23	3	Claude Edorh	Germany	13.64	
24	4	Andy Tulloch	Great Britain	13.68	
25	3	Igor Kováč	Slovakia	13.70	
26	3	Andrey Kislykh	Russia	13.74	
27	1	Pedro Chiamulera	Brazil	13.77	
28	2	Emmanuel Romary	France	13.81	
29	4	Walmes de Souza	Brazil	14.12	
30	4	Tim Kroeker	Canada	14.14	
—	1	Eric Kaiser	Germany	DNF	q
—	1	Tony Jarrett	Great Britain	DSQ	R163.2

=== Semifinals ===
==== Semifinal 1 ====
Rank	Lane	Athlete	Nation	Reaction	Time	Notes
1	5	Allen Johnson	United States	0.194	13.10	Q
2	6	Colin Jackson	Great Britain	0.139	13.17	Q
3	4	Emilio Valle	Cuba	0.198	13.18	Q
4	7	Kyle Vander-Kuyp	Australia	0.156	13.38	Q
5	8	Krzysztof Mehlich	Poland	0.189	13.55	
6	1	Gheorghe Boroi	Romania	0.137	13.57	
7	3	Sven Pieters	Belgium	0.136	13.59	
8	9	Eric Kaiser	Germany	0.168	13.59	
9	2	Li Tong	China	0.143	13.60	
				Wind: +0.5 m/s		

==== Semifinal 2 ====
Rank	Lane	Athlete	Nation	Reaction	Time	Notes
1	6	Florian Schwarthoff	Germany	0.156	13.13	Q
2	4	Eugene Swift	United States	0.158	13.21	Q
3	3	Mark Crear	United States	0.194	13.22	Q
4	8	Erik Batte	Cuba	0.168	13.26	Q
5	2	Vincent Clarico	France	0.173	13.43	
6	5	Robert Foster	Jamaica	0.182	13.49	
7	1	Igors Kazanovs	Latvia	0.172	14.13	
—	7	Johan Lisabeth	Belgium	0.155	DNF	
				Wind: +1.7 m/s		

=== Final ===
Rank	Lane	Athlete	Nation	Reaction	Time
1st place, gold medalist(s)	6	Allen Johnson	United States	0.170	12.95; OR
2nd place, silver medalist(s)	8	Mark Crear	United States	0.124	13.09
3rd place, bronze medalist(s)	3	Florian Schwarthoff	Germany	0.164	13.17
4	5	Colin Jackson	Great Britain	0.133	13.19
5	7	Emilio Valle	Cuba	0.179	13.20
6	4	Eugene Swift	United States	0.151	13.23
7	2	Kyle Vander-Kuyp	Australia	0.160	13.40
8	1	Erik Batte	Cuba	0.160	13.43
				Wind: +0.6 m/s	

== See also ==
- 1992 Men's Olympic 110m Hurdles (Barcelona)
- 1993 Men's World Championships 110m Hurdles (Stuttgart)
- 1994 Men's European Championships 110m Hurdles (Helsinki)
- 1995 Men's World Championships 110m Hurdles (Gothenburg)
- 1997 Men's World Championships 110m Hurdles (Athens)
- 1998 Men's European Championships 110m Hurdles (Budapest)
- 1999 Men's World Championships 110m Hurdles (Seville)
- 2000 Men's Olympic 110m Hurdles (Sydney)
