= 1994 Ibero-American Championships in Athletics – Results =

These are the results of the 1994 Ibero-American Championships in Athletics which took place from 27 to 30 October 1994 at Estadio Municipal Teodoro Bronzini in Mar del Plata, Argentina.

== Men's results ==
=== 100 meters ===
Heat 1 – 27 October
Wind: -2.5 m/s

Rank	Name	Nationality	Time	Notes
1	Carlos Moreno	Chile	10.62	Q
2	Carlos Gats	Argentina	10.73	Q
3	Jorge Luis Aguilera	Cuba	10.76	Q
4	Luís Cunha	Portugal	10.79	q
5	Luis Vega	Colombia	10.85	q
6	Genaro Rojas	Mexico	11.09	
7	Omar Triviño	Ecuador	11.42	
8	Martín Soria	Uruguay	11.65	

Heat 2 – 27 October
Wind: -3.7 m/s

Rank	Name	Nationality	Time	Notes
1	Leonardo Prevost	Cuba	10.65	Q
2	Jaime Barragán	Mexico	10.83	Q
3	Claudinei Quirino da Silva	Brazil	10.90	Q
4	Pablo Almeida	Chile	11.02	
5	Cristian Vitasse	Argentina	11.07	
6	Robinson Urrutia	Colombia	11.08	
7	Javier Verme	Peru	11.10	
8	Alexis Recioy	Uruguay	11.33	
9	Néstor Machuca	Paraguay	11.70	

Final – 28 October
Wind: +3.2 m/s

Rank	Name	Nationality	Time	Notes
1st place, gold medalist(s)	Carlos Gats	Argentina	10.50 w	
2nd place, silver medalist(s)	Jaime Barragán	Mexico	10.52 w	
3rd place, bronze medalist(s)	Jorge Luis Aguilera	Cuba	10.56 w	
4	Leonardo Prevost	Cuba	10.58 w	
5	Carlos Moreno	Chile	10.60 w	
6	Luís Cunha	Portugal	10.73 w	
7	Luis Vega	Colombia	10.75 w	
8	Claudinei Quirino da Silva	Brazil	10.75 w	

=== 200 meters ===
Heat 1 – 29 October
Wind: -0.8 m/s

Rank	Name	Nationality	Time	Notes
1	Sebastián Keitel	Chile	21.43	Q
2	Luís Cunha	Portugal	21.88	Q
3	Javier Verme	Peru	21.88	
4	Luis Vega	Colombia	21.95	
5	Daniel Sarmiento	Uruguay	22.33	
6	Carlos Villaseñor	Mexico	22.36	
7	Eric Krings	Guatemala	22.88	

Heat 2 – 29 October
Wind: -1.5 m/s

Rank	Name	Nationality	Time	Notes
1	Carlos Gats	Argentina	21.36	Q
2	Jorge Luis Aguilera	Cuba	21.64	Q
3	Francisco Javier Navarro	Spain	21.71	q
4	Carlos Moreno	Chile	21.80	

Heat 3 – 29 October
Wind: -2.1 m/s

Rank	Name	Nationality	Time	Notes
1	Marcelo Brivilati da Silva	Brazil	21.41	Q
2	Wenceslao Ferrín	Colombia	21.45	Q
3	Leonardo Prevost	Cuba	21.68	q
4	Carlos del Piñal	Spain	22.32	
5	Claudio Arcas	Argentina	22.39	
6	Genaro Rojas	Mexico	22.44	

Final – 30 October
Wind: +1.2 m/s

Rank	Name	Nationality	Time	Notes
1st place, gold medalist(s)	Sebastián Keitel	Chile	20.43	
2nd place, silver medalist(s)	Carlos Gats	Argentina	20.51	
3rd place, bronze medalist(s)	Leonardo Prevost	Cuba	20.61	
4	Marcelo Brivilati da Silva	Brazil	20.69	
5	Wenceslao Ferrín	Colombia	20.88	
6	Jorge Luis Aguilera	Cuba	21.08	
7	Luís Cunha	Portugal	21.18	
8	Francisco Javier Navarro	Spain	21.23	

=== 400 meters ===
Heat 1 – 27 October

Rank	Name	Nationality	Time	Notes
1	Sebastián Keitel	Chile	47.10	Q
2	Claudio Arcas	Argentina	48.35	Q
3	Clóvis Fernandes	Brazil	49.18	Q
4	Piero Chichizola	Peru	49.79	q
5	Alberto Araujo	Mexico	49.88	

Heat 2 – 27 October

Rank	Name	Nationality	Time	Notes
1	Sidney Telles de Souza	Brazil	47.35	Q
2	Guillermo Cacián	Argentina	47.52	Q
3	Raymundo Escalante	Mexico	47.67	Q
4	Ricardo Roach	Chile	48.09	q
5	Marcos García	Uruguay	50.81	
6	Alberto Maguna	Uruguay	52.05	

Final – 28 October

Rank	Name	Nationality	Time	Notes
1st place, gold medalist(s)	Sebastián Keitel	Chile	46.72	
2nd place, silver medalist(s)	Sidney Telles de Souza	Brazil	47.50	
3rd place, bronze medalist(s)	Guillermo Cacián	Argentina	47.88	
4	Ricardo Roach	Chile	48.00	
5	Clóvis Fernandes	Brazil	48.22	
6	Raymundo Escalante	Mexico	48.24	
7	Piero Chichizola	Peru	50.03	
8	Claudio Arcas	Argentina	50.80	

=== 800 meters ===
Heat 1 – 29 October

Rank	Name	Nationality	Time	Notes
1	Carlos Gabriel López^{†}	Argentina	1:51.27	Q
2	José Carlos Dias de Oliveira	Brazil	1:51.49	Q
3	Luis Karim Toledo	Mexico	1:52.09	Q
4	Javier Soto^{†}	Puerto Rico	1:53.00	q
5	Arisk Perdomo	Guatemala	1:53.48	

^{†}: Only the last name is known. The full name was assigned tentatively.

Heat 2 – 29 October

Rank	Name	Nationality	Time	Notes
1	Edimilson da Silva	Brazil	1:52.22	Q
2	Amado Ramos	Cuba	1:52.56	Q
3	Pablo Squella	Chile	1:52.90	Q
4	José Gregorio López^{†}	Venezuela	1:53.10	q
5	Arturo Espejel	Mexico	1:54.50	
6	Gabriel Umpiérrez	Uruguay	1:57.49	

^{†}: Only the last name is known. The full name was assigned tentatively.

Final – 29 October

Rank	Name	Nationality	Time	Notes
1st place, gold medalist(s)	José Carlos Dias de Oliveira	Brazil	1:49.49	
2nd place, silver medalist(s)	Pablo Squella	Chile	1:49.50	
3rd place, bronze medalist(s)	Edimilson da Silva	Brazil	1:49.91	
4	Carlos Gabriel López	Argentina	1:51.08	
5	Luis Karim Toledo	Mexico	1:51.31	
6	Amado Ramos	Cuba	1:52.13	

=== 1500 meters ===
Final – 28 October

Rank	Name	Nationality	Time	Notes
1st place, gold medalist(s)	José Gregorio López	Venezuela	3:54.04	
2nd place, silver medalist(s)	Amado Ramos	Cuba	3:54.17	
3rd place, bronze medalist(s)	Antonio Herrador	Spain	3:54.22	
4	José Carlos Dias de Oliveira	Brazil	3:54.29	
5	Gilberto Merchant	Mexico	3:54.65	
6	Javier Rodríguez	Spain	3:55.37	
7	Arturo Espejel	Mexico	3:56.51	
8	Leonardo Malgor	Argentina	3:57.19	
9	Arisk Perdomo	Guatemala	4:03.84	
10	Gabriel Umpiérrez	Uruguay	4:05.84	

=== 5000 meters ===
Final – 27 October

Rank	Name	Nationality	Time	Notes
1st place, gold medalist(s)	Ronaldo da Costa	Brazil	13:47.99	
2nd place, silver medalist(s)	Martín Pitayo	Mexico	13:50.31	
3rd place, bronze medalist(s)	Raimundo Santos	Portugal	13:51.15	
4	Silvio Guerra	Ecuador	13:54.10	
5	Ricardo Pintado	Spain	14:04.33	
6	Salvador Parra	Mexico	14:10.82	
7	Antonio Silio	Argentina	14:19.68	
8	Daniel Castro	Argentina	14:33.16	
9	René Colque	Bolivia	14:38.95	
10	Marcos Juárez	Guatemala	14:41.62	

=== 10,000 meters ===
Final – 29 October

Rank	Name	Nationality	Time	Notes
1st place, gold medalist(s)	Armando Quintanilla	Mexico	28:06.88	
2nd place, silver medalist(s)	Ronaldo da Costa	Brazil	28:18.26	
3rd place, bronze medalist(s)	Jorge Márquez	Mexico	28:24.03	
4	Silvio Guerra	Ecuador	28:40.16	
5	Waldemar Cotelo	Uruguay	29:27.29	
6	Oscar Amaya	Argentina	29:38.41	
7	René Colque	Bolivia	29:48.36	
8	Marcos Juárez	Guatemala	29:54.15	
	José Dias	Portugal	DNF	
	Antonio Silio	Argentina	DNF	

=== 110 meters hurdles ===
Heat 1 – 27 October
Wind: -2.3 m/s

Rank	Name	Nationality	Time	Notes
1	Eliexer Pulgar	Venezuela	14.70	Q
3	Marco Mina	Peru	14.77	Q
4	Ricardo D'Andrilli	Argentina	14.81	q
5	Alex Foster	Costa Rica	14.92	
6	Omar Triviño	Ecuador	14.94	

Heat 2 – 27 October
Wind: -2.1 m/s

Rank	Name	Nationality	Time	Notes
1	Walmes Rangel de Souza	Brazil	14.34	Q
2	Arturo Rodríguez	Chile	14.58	Q
3	Eric Batte	Cuba	14.59	Q
4	José Humberto Rivas	Colombia	14.63	q
5	Oscar Ratto	Argentina	14.87	

Final – 28 October
Wind: +2.0 m/s

Rank	Name	Nationality	Time	Notes
1st place, gold medalist(s)	Eric Batte	Cuba	14.31	
2nd place, silver medalist(s)	Walmes Rangel de Souza	Brazil	14.33	
3rd place, bronze medalist(s)	Miguel De los Santos	Spain	14.47	
4	Arturo Rodríguez	Chile	14.48	
5	Marco Mina	Peru	14.65	
6	Eliexer Pulgar	Venezuela	14.72	
7	José Humberto Rivas	Colombia	15.27	
	Ricardo D'Andrilli	Argentina	DNS	

=== 400 meters hurdles ===
Heat 1 – 29 October

Rank	Name	Nationality	Time	Notes
1	Eronilde Nunes de Araújo	Brazil	51.64	Q
2	Llimy Rivas	Colombia	52.34	Q
3	Luis Vicente Sánchez	Spain	53.56	Q
4	Gabriel Corradini	Argentina	53.62	
5	Mario Reis	Portugal	53.69	
6	Víctor Mendoza	Peru	57.41	
7	Omar Triviño	Ecuador	58.00	

Heat 2 – 29 October

Rank	Name	Nationality	Time	Notes
1	Everson Teixeira da Silva	Brazil	50.65	Q
2	Juan Vallín	Mexico	51.18	Q
3	Alejandro Argudín	Cuba	51.86	Q
4	Alex Foster	Costa Rica	52.05	q
5	David López	Spain	52.65	q
6	Eric Krings	Guatemala	53.10	

Final – 30 October

Rank	Name	Nationality	Time	Notes
1st place, gold medalist(s)	Everson Teixeira da Silva	Brazil	49.76	
2nd place, silver medalist(s)	Juan Vallín	Mexico	50.31	
3rd place, bronze medalist(s)	Eronilde Nunes de Araújo	Brazil	50.36	
4	Llimy Rivas	Colombia	51.07	
5	Alejandro Argudín	Cuba	51.80	
6	Alex Foster	Costa Rica	52.32	
7	David López	Spain	52.34	
8	Luis Vicente Sánchez	Spain	53.41	

=== 3000 meters steeplechase ===
Final – 30 October

Rank	Name	Nationality	Time	Notes
1st place, gold medalist(s)	Javier Rodríguez	Spain	8:35.03	
2nd place, silver medalist(s)	Rubén García	Mexico	8:36.81	
3rd place, bronze medalist(s)	Inocencio López	Spain	8:41.22	
4	Leonardo Rossato Ribas	Brazil	8:42.02	
5	Leonardo Malgor	Argentina	8:43.92	
6	Salvador Miranda	Mexico	8:53.44	
7	Juan Ramón Conde	Cuba	9:00.79	
	Jaime Valenzuela	Chile	DNF	
	Jaciel Rodrigues da Silva	Brazil	DNF	

=== High jump ===
Final – 29 October

Rank	Name	Nationality	Attempts											Result	Notes
Rank	Name	Nationality	1.95	2.00	2.05	2.10	2.15	2.20	2.23	2.26	2.29	2.32	2.36	Result	Notes
1st place, gold medalist(s)	Gilmar Mayo	Colombia	–	–	–	–	–	o	o	o	o	o	xx-	2.32	
2nd place, silver medalist(s)	Marino Drake	Cuba	–	–	–	o	o	o	xxo	o	xxx			2.26	
3rd place, bronze medalist(s)	Fernando Moreno	Argentina	–	o	o	o	o	xo	xxx					2.20	
4	Hugo Muñoz	Peru	–	–	o	xo	xo	xxo	xxx					2.20	
5	Marcos dos Santos	Brazil	–	o	o	xo	xo	xxx						2.15	
6	Alcides Silva	Brazil	–	o	o	xxx								2.05	
7	Antonio Burgos	Puerto Rico	–	–	xo	xxx								2.05	
8	Valeri Abuggattas	Peru	o	o	xxo	xxx								2.05	
9	Ricardo Oliva	Mexico	o	o	xxx									2.00	
10	José Barahona	Panama	o	xo	xxx									2.00	
11	Rafael Valdez	Dominican Republic	–	xxo	xxx									2.00	
12	Rolando Garay	Uruguay	o	xxx										1.95	

=== Pole vault ===
Final – 27 October

Rank	Name	Nationality	Attempts										Result	Notes
Rank	Name	Nationality	4.30	4.50	4.70	4.80	4.90	5.00	5.10	5.15	5.20	5.41	Result	Notes
1st place, gold medalist(s)	Nuno Fernandes	Portugal	–	–	–	–	–	xxo	–	xxo	–	xxx	5.15	
2nd place, silver medalist(s)	Miguel Berrios	Cuba	–	–	–	–	o	o	xo	–	xxx		5.10	
3rd place, bronze medalist(s)	Francisco Mas	Spain	–	–	–	o	–	xxo	xxx				5.00	
4	Cristian Aspillaga	Chile	–	xo	xo	–	xxo	xxo	xxx				5.00	
5	Fernando Pastoriza	Argentina	–	–	o	o	o	xxx					4.90	
6	Oscar Veit	Argentina	–	–	xxo	o	o	xxx					4.90	
	Rolando Garay	Uruguay	xxx										NH	
	Edgar León	Mexico	–	–	xxx								NH	
	Marlon Borges	Brazil	–	xxx									NH	

=== Long jump ===
Final – 27 October

Rank	Name	Nationality	Attempts						Result	Notes
Rank	Name	Nationality	1	2	3	4	5	6	Result	Notes
1st place, gold medalist(s)	Jaime Jefferson	Cuba	7.81 w (+3.3)	7.53 (-1.6)	7.82 w (+3.8)	x	x	x	7.82 w (+3.8 m/s)	
2nd place, silver medalist(s)	Paulo Sergio de Oliveira	Brazil	x	7.77 (+1.1)	x	7.71 (+0.0)	7.48 w (+3.2)	7.28 (-1.4)	7.77 (+1.1 m/s)	
3rd place, bronze medalist(s)	Rogelio Saenz	Mexico	x	6.96 w (+4.9)	7.73 w (+3.8)	5.67 w (+2.8)	7.73 (+2.0)	x	7.73 w (+3.8 m/s)	
4	Elmer Williams	Puerto Rico	7.39 w (+3.7)	7.69 (+1.5)	x	7.03 (+1.3)	6.99 (-3.3)	7.29 (-0.8)	7.69 (+1.5 m/s)	
5	Carlos Calado	Portugal	7.07 (-1.6)	7.14 w (+2.2)	6.99 (+1.6)	6.72 (+1.4)	6.94 (+1.7)	x	7.14 w (+2.2 m/s)	
6	Néstor Madrid	Argentina	6.43 w (+3.5)	6.72 w (+3.5)	7.04 w (+2.2)	6.98 w (+3.3)	6.93 (-0.2)	6.90 (-3.1)	7.04 w (+2.2 m/s)	
7	Gerardo Guevara	Mexico	6.90 (+0.9)	x	6.99 (+2.0)		7.03 (+0.2)	x	7.03 (+0.2 m/s)	
8	Cristian Stahl	Uruguay	6.98 (+0.8)	x	x	x	x	x	6.98 (+0.8 m/s)	
9	Pablo Silva	Argentina	6.95 w (+2.8)	x	6.91 w (+2.5)				6.95 w (+2.8 m/s)	
10	Oscar Valiente	Peru	x	6.88 (+0.8)	x				6.88 (+0.8 m/s)	
11	Ricardo Valiente	Peru	6.76 w (+4.3)	x	6.47 (+2.0)				6.76 w (+4.3 m/s)	
12	Alexis Recioy	Uruguay	6.22 (+1.3)	6.50 w (+3.8)	4.76 (+1.7)				6.50 w (+3.8 m/s)	

=== Triple jump ===
Final – 30 October

Rank	Name	Nationality	Attempts						Result	Notes
Rank	Name	Nationality	1	2	3	4	5	6	Result	Notes
1st place, gold medalist(s)	Anísio Souza Silva	Brazil	x	14.76 (+1.3)	16.66 (+0.7)	14.45 w (+2.2)	16.45 (-0.5)	x	16.66 (+0.7 m/s)	
2nd place, silver medalist(s)	Daniel Osorio	Cuba	16.39 w (+3.3)	15.82 (+0.7)	16.36 (+1.7)	x	x	x	16.39 w (+3.3 m/s)	
3rd place, bronze medalist(s)	Freddy Nieves	Ecuador	15.70 (+1.6)	15.98 (+0.3)	15.67 (+0.3)	14.41 (+0.8)	15.48 (+0.1)	15.72 w (+2.3)	15.98 (+0.3 m/s)	
4	Sergio Saavedra	Venezuela	x	x	x	x	15.79 (-0.1)	x	15.79 (-0.1 m/s)	
5	Gerardo Guevara	Mexico	15.12 (+1.2)	15.51 (+1.1)	15.35 (+0.8)	x	x	15.71 (+1.8)	15.71 (+1.8 m/s)	
6	Oscar Valiente	Peru	14.08 (+0.3)	14.75 (+0.4)	15.21 (+2.0)	15.25 (+0.9)	15.49 (+1.9)	14.90 (-1.2)	15.49 (+1.9 m/s)	
7	Carlos Atencio	Peru	15.11 (+1.0)	15.20 (+1.2)	13.94 (+0.5)	14.80 (-0.4)	15.09 (+1.4)	15.15 (-1.4)	15.20 (+1.2 m/s)	
8	Juan Carlos Chávez	Argentina	x	14.64 w (+4.0)	x	14.83 (+0.5)	14.46 (-1.5)	14.64 (-1.7)	14.83 (+0.5 m/s)	

=== Shot put ===
Final – 30 October

Rank	Name	Nationality	Attempts						Result	Notes
Rank	Name	Nationality	1	2	3	4	5	6	Result	Notes
1st place, gold medalist(s)	Gert Weil	Chile	18.24	18.24	18.69	19.30	19.16	19.01	19.30	
2nd place, silver medalist(s)	Manuel Martínez	Spain	17.94	x	18.51	18.70	18.16	18.59	18.70	
3rd place, bronze medalist(s)	Adilson Oliveira	Brazil	17.66	17.43	17.55	17.56	17.66	17.77	17.77	
4	Edson Miguel	Brazil	x	16.59	x	x	17.37	16.36	17.37	
5	Yoger Medina	Venezuela	x	17.24	17.21	x	17.03	17.01	17.24	
6	José Luis Martínez	Spain	16.94	16.50	16.79	17.17	x	16.60	17.17	
7	Yosvany Obregón	Cuba	16.90	x	x	17.07	17.02	x	17.07	
8	Francisco Ball	Puerto Rico	15.98	16.42	16.69	15.73	16.48	17.02	17.02	
9	Fernando Alves	Portugal	15.98	16.07	x				16.07	
10	Adrián Marzo	Argentina	15.50	15.08	15.42				15.50	
11	Daniel Ríos Ortega	Mexico	14.22	x	13.96				14.22	
12	Daniel Duharte	Peru	13.68	13.49	13.50				13.68	
	Andrés Charadía	Argentina	x	x	x				NM	

=== Discus throw ===
Final – 27 October

Rank	Name	Nationality	Attempts						Result	Notes
Rank	Name	Nationality	1	2	3	4	5	6	Result	Notes
1st place, gold medalist(s)	Ramón Jiménez Gaona	Paraguay	x	60.42	57.66	58.54	x	x	60.42	
2nd place, silver medalist(s)	João Joaquim dos Santos	Brazil	50.84	57.98	58.20	x	56.98	59.20	59.20	
3rd place, bronze medalist(s)	Marcelo Pugliese	Argentina	57.18	x	x	59.18	x	x	59.18	
4	Luis Mariano Delís	Cuba	57.36	54.04	55.56	55.24	55.02	55.18	57.36	
5	Frank Bicet	Cuba	x	x	49.98	56.36	x	57.24	57.24	
6	Edson Miguel	Brazil	48.60	48.46	50.80	50.18	x	47.66	54.86	
7	Carlos Esparza	Spain	48.60	48.46	50.80	50.18	x	47.66	50.80	
8	Fernando Alves	Portugal	x	49.88	x	–	–	–	49.88	

=== Hammer throw ===
Final – 29 October

Rank	Name	Nationality	Attempts						Result	Notes
Rank	Name	Nationality	1	2	3	4	5	6	Result	Notes
1st place, gold medalist(s)	Andrés Charadía	Argentina	69.46	70.80	68.60	69.32	69.38	69.20	70.80	
2nd place, silver medalist(s)	Guillermo Guzmán	Mexico	67.58	x	65.72	65.88	65.26	67.74	67.74	
3rd place, bronze medalist(s)	Eladio Hernández	Cuba	x	x	63.36	66.06	x	66.90	66.90	
4	Vitor da Costa	Portugal	64.90	65.72	62.56	64.76	63.46	66.20	66.20	
5	Adrián Marzo	Argentina	65.30	x	65.84	x	61.38	64.46	65.84	
6	Antón María Godall	Spain	63.22	x	65.48	x	62.76	65.30	65.48	
7	José Manuel Pérez	Spain	x	x	59.66	65.22	65.22	65.22	65.22	
8	Mario Luis Leme	Brazil	x	55.44	51.58	55.88	55.24	55.52	55.88	
9	Eduardo Acuña	Peru	x	53.90	x				53.90	

=== Javelin throw ===
Final – 28 October

Rank	Name	Nationality	Attempts						Result	Notes
Rank	Name	Nationality	1	2	3	4	5	6	Result	Notes
1st place, gold medalist(s)	Luis Lucumí	Colombia	70.72	72.30	73.26	75.40	x	–	75.40	
2nd place, silver medalist(s)	Julián Sotelo	Spain	66.18	72.92	72.90	73.88	x	x	73.88	
3rd place, bronze medalist(s)	Martín Castillo	Mexico	69.10	67.38	68.60	x	69.36	66.98	69.36	
4	Luiz Fernando da Silva	Brazil	65.20	68.96	67.16	65.26	68.76	68.96	68.96	
5	Gustavo Wielandt	Chile	66.38	66.68	67.16	63.80	62.30	65.26	67.16	
6	Mauricio Silva	Argentina	67.02	64.18	62.10	66.76	61.68	62.58	67.02	
7	Carlos Cunha	Portugal	65.36	61.44	62.10	60.92	x	–	65.36	
8	Rigoberto Calderón	Nicaragua	63.16	62.90	x	65.14	62.96		65.14	

=== Decathlon ===
Final – 28–29 October

The highest mark recorded in each event is highlighted in yellow

Rank	Name	Nationality	100m	LJ	SP	HJ	400m	110m H	DT	PV	JT	1500m	Points	Notes
1st place, gold medalist(s)	Mário Aníbal Ramos	Portugal	11.20 W (+10.9)	6.91 W (+8.4)	14.24	2.03	51.96	15.70 (-1.9)	41.76	4.40	49.12	4:29.51	7.431 W	
2nd place, silver medalist(s)	Miguel Valle	Cuba	11.04 W (+10.9)	7.06 W (+6.1)	13.60	1.82	53.04	14.82 (-1.9)	39.82	4.50	59.54	4:51.56	7.340 W	
3rd place, bronze medalist(s)	José Ricardo de Assis Nunes	Brazil	11.06 W (+10.9)	6.57 w (+3.6)	12.57	1.85	51.54	15.80 (-1.9)	39.88	3.80	59.84	4:30.40	7.072 W	
4	Alejandro Cárdenas	Mexico	10.56 W (+10.9)	7.22 (-4.5)	11.63	1.73	48.52	16.17 (-1.9)	30.74	3.90	56.14	4:38.77	7.015 W	
5	Jorge Camacho Peñaloza	Mexico	11.28 W (+10.9)	6.58 w (+3.0)	12.62	1.85	51.78	15.47 (-1.9)	37.64	4.50	42.36	4:30.30	6.953 W	
6	Diego Martín Kerwitz	Argentina	11.78 W (+10.9)	6.86 W (+6.6)	10.10	1.97	54.47	17.41 (-1.9)	30.54	4.20	50.44	5:00.69	6.251^{‡} W	

^{‡}: It is reported that the result of Diego Martín Kerwitz should be corrected to 6.245 pts, because the 100m time of 11.78 corresponds to 695 pts rather than 701 pts.

=== 20 kilometers walk ===
Final – 29 October

Rank	Name	Nationality	Time	Notes
1st place, gold medalist(s)	Daniel García	Mexico	1:21:20.0	
2nd place, silver medalist(s)	Querubín Moreno	Colombia	1:21:37.2	
3rd place, bronze medalist(s)	Héctor Moreno	Colombia	1:21:49.9	
4	Claudio Luiz Bertolino	Brazil	1:22:14.0	
5	Jefferson Pérez	Ecuador	1:26:08.2	
6	Carlos Ramoles	Venezuela	1:27:07.6	
7	Fernando Vázquez	Spain	1:27:49.5	
8	Jorge Loréfice	Argentina	1:28:16.2	
9	Eloy Quispe	Bolivia	1:28:50.8	
	Freddy Choque	Bolivia	DNF	
	Benjamín Loréfice	Argentina	DQ	

=== 4 × 100 meters relay ===
Final – 27 October

Rank	Nation	Competitors	Time	Notes
1st place, gold medalist(s)	Cuba	Jorge Luis Aguilera; Leonardo Prevost; Andrés Simón; Joel Lamela	39.99	
2nd place, silver medalist(s)	Brazil	Marcelo Brivilati da Silva; Sidney Telles de Souza; Claudinei Quirino da Silva; Walmes Rangel de Souza	40.53	
3rd place, bronze medalist(s)	Colombia	Robinson Urrutia; Wenceslao Ferrín; Luis Vega; José Humberto Rivas	40.79	
	Chile	Sebastián Keitel; Carlos Moreno; Pablo Almeida; Ricardo Roach	DNF	
	Uruguay	Daniel Sarmiento; Alexis Recioy; Cristian Stahl; Martín Soria	DNF	
	Mexico	Jaime Barragán; Genaro Rojas; Miguel Miranda; Carlos Villaseñor	DNF	
	Argentina	Guillermo Cacián; Carlos Gats; Cristian Vitasse; Jorge Polanco	DNF	

=== 4 × 400 meters relay ===
Final – 30 October

Rank	Nation	Competitors	Time	Notes
1st place, gold medalist(s)	Brazil	Sidney Telles de Souza; Clóvis Fernandes; Ediélson Rocha Tenorio; Eronilde Nunes de Araújo	3:06.54	
2nd place, silver medalist(s)	Mexico	Raymundo Escalante; Juan Vallín; Luis Karim Toledo; Alejandro Cárdenas	3:07.75	
3rd place, bronze medalist(s)	Colombia	Robinson Urrutia; Llimy Rivas; Luis Vega; Wenceslao Ferrín	3:08.24	
4	Chile	Sebastián Keitel; Carlos Moreno; Pablo Squella; Ricardo Roach	3:08.27	
5	Argentina	Claudio Arcas; Guillermo Cacián; Cristian Vitasse; Gustavo Aguirre	3:10.51	
6	Uruguay	Marcos García; Alberto Maguna; Andrés Zunino; Martín Soria	3:21.45	
	Cuba	Alejandro Argudín; Amado Ramos; Jorge Luis Aguilera; Roberto Hernández	DSQ	

== Women's results ==
=== 100 meters ===
Final – 28 October
Wind: +1.6 m/s

Rank	Name	Nationality	Time	Notes
1st place, gold medalist(s)	Cleide Amaral	Brazil	11.66	
2nd place, silver medalist(s)	Mirtha Brock	Colombia	11.78	
3rd place, bronze medalist(s)	Lisette Rondón	Chile	11.89	
4	Kátia Regina de Jesús Santos	Brazil	12.02	
5	Patricia Rodríguez	Colombia	12.03	
6	Daniela Lebreo	Argentina	12.19	
7	Idalia Hechavarría	Cuba	12.25	
8	Virginia Lebreo	Argentina	12.29	
9	Claudia Acerenza	Uruguay	12.43	

=== 200 meters ===
Heat 1 – 29 October
Wind: -0.7 m/s

Rank	Name	Nationality	Time	Notes
1	Patricia Rodríguez	Colombia	24.22	Q
2	Tatiana Orcy	Brazil	24.62	Q
3	Marcela Barros	Chile	24.67	Q
4	Daniela Lebreo	Argentina	24.94	q
5	Idalia Hechavarría	Cuba	25.65	

Heat 2 – 29 October
Wind: -0.6 m/s

Rank	Name	Nationality	Time	Notes
1	Ximena Restrepo	Colombia	24.12	Q
2	Lisette Rondón	Chile	24.40	Q
3	Kátia Regina de Jesús Santos	Brazil	24.81	Q
4	Marcela Tiscornia	Uruguay	24.82	q
5	Olga Conte	Argentina	25.98	

Final – 30 October
Wind: +4.4 m/s

Rank	Name	Nationality	Time	Notes
1st place, gold medalist(s)	Ximena Restrepo	Colombia	23.07 w	
2nd place, silver medalist(s)	Lisette Rondón	Chile	23.69 w	
3rd place, bronze medalist(s)	Kátia Regina de Jesús Santos	Brazil	23.77 w	
4	Patricia Rodríguez	Colombia	23.82 w	
5	Marcela Tiscornia	Uruguay	24.08 w	
6	Tatiana Orcy	Brazil	24.24 w	
7	Marcela Barros	Chile	24.32 w	
8	Daniela Lebreo	Argentina	24.44 w	

=== 400 meters ===
Final – 28 October

Rank	Name	Nationality	Time	Notes
1st place, gold medalist(s)	Ximena Restrepo	Colombia	52.69	
2nd place, silver medalist(s)	Odalmis Limonta	Cuba	54.54	
3rd place, bronze medalist(s)	Elia Mera	Colombia	55.33	
4	Maria Magnólia Souza Figueiredo	Brazil	55.44	
5	Rosângela de Souza Oliveira	Brazil	58.46	
6	Olga Conte	Argentina	1:00.12	

=== 800 meters ===
Final – 30 October

Rank	Name	Nationality	Time	Notes
1st place, gold medalist(s)	Fátima dos Santos	Brazil	2:06.26	
2nd place, silver medalist(s)	Odalmis Limonta	Cuba	2:07.26	
3rd place, bronze medalist(s)	Marta Orellana	Argentina	2:07.29	
4	Sara Montecinos	Chile	2:08.94	
5	Marlene Moreira da Silva	Brazil	2:09.74	
6	Antonia Aznar	Spain	2:09.87	
7	Inés Justet	Uruguay	2:13.66	

=== 1500 meters ===
Final – 28 October

Rank	Name	Nationality	Time	Notes
1st place, gold medalist(s)	Ana Claudia de Souza	Brazil	4:28.50	
2nd place, silver medalist(s)	Mireya Ailhaud	Mexico	4:30.20	
3rd place, bronze medalist(s)	Mabel Arrúa	Argentina	4:35.84	
4	Elsa Monterroso	Guatemala	4:43.16	
5	Lucia Mendiola	Mexico	4:44.45	
6	Gina Coello	Honduras	5:16.38	

=== 3000 meters ===
Final – 30 October

Rank	Name	Nationality	Time	Notes
1st place, gold medalist(s)	Silvana Pereira	Brazil	9:14.53	
2nd place, silver medalist(s)	Lucía Mendiola	Mexico	9:17.19	
3rd place, bronze medalist(s)	Yesenia Centeno	Cuba	9:21.55	
4	Mireya Ailhaud	Mexico	9:24.05	
5	Stella Castro	Colombia	9:36.12	
6	Elsa Monterroso	Guatemala	9:42.33	
7	Mabel Arrúa	Argentina	9:47.19	

=== 10,000 meters ===
Final – 28 October

Rank	Name	Nationality	Time	Notes
1st place, gold medalist(s)	Silvana Pereira	Brazil	33:29.60	
2nd place, silver medalist(s)	Lucia Rendón	Mexico	33:48.32	
3rd place, bronze medalist(s)	Stella Castro	Colombia	34:04.27	
4	Paola Cabrera	Mexico	34:28.07	
5	Elisa Cobañea	Argentina	34:31.07	
6	Yesenia Centeno	Cuba	35:07.35	
7	Marlene Flores	Chile	35:08.66	

=== 100 meters hurdles ===
Final – 28 October
Wind: +3.3 m/s

Rank	Name	Nationality	Time	Notes
1st place, gold medalist(s)	Damarys Anderson	Cuba	13.81 w	
2nd place, silver medalist(s)	Verónica Depaoli	Argentina	13.90 w	
3rd place, bronze medalist(s)	Carmen Gloria Bezanilla	Chile	14.01 w	
4	Alejandra Martínez	Chile	14.28 w	
5	Vânia Amorim dos Santos	Brazil	14.46 w	
6	Claudia Casals	Argentina	14.74 w	

=== 400 meters hurdles ===
Final – 30 October

Rank	Name	Nationality	Time	Notes
1st place, gold medalist(s)	Odalys Hernández	Cuba	57.89	
2nd place, silver medalist(s)	Flor Robledo	Colombia	59.09	
3rd place, bronze medalist(s)	Marise de Castro Silva	Brazil	59.21	
4	Sandra Izquierdo	Argentina	1:00.38	
5	María Gabriela Fornaciari	Argentina	1:00.59	

=== High jump ===
Final – 28 October

Rank	Name	Nationality	Attempts					Result	Notes
Rank	Name	Nationality	1.60	1.65	1.70	1.75	1.80	Result	Notes
1st place, gold medalist(s)	Dania Fernández	Cuba	–	–	o	o	xxx	1.75	
2nd place, silver medalist(s)	Luciane Dambacher	Brazil	–	o	xo	o	xxx	1.75	
3rd place, bronze medalist(s)	Orlane Maria Lima dos Santos	Brazil	–	–	o	xo	xxx	1.75	
4	Alejandra Chomalí	Chile	o	o	o	xxx		1.70	
5	Solange Witteveen	Argentina	o	o	xxx			1.65	

=== Long jump ===
Final – 29 October

Rank	Name	Nationality	Attempts						Result	Notes
Rank	Name	Nationality	1	2	3	4	5	6	Result	Notes
1st place, gold medalist(s)	Andrea Ávila	Argentina	6.58 (+1.9)	6.26 (+1.4)	6.14 (+0.1)	6.39 w (+2.3)	6.31 (+0.8)	6.35 (+0.7)	6.58 (+1.9 m/s)	
2nd place, silver medalist(s)	Luciana Alves dos Santos	Brazil	6.18 (+0.7)	x	5.96 (+0.5)	6.14 (+1.8)	6.02 (+0.5)	6.17 (+0.4)	6.18 (+0.7 m/s)	
3rd place, bronze medalist(s)	Alejandra García	Argentina	5.75 (+2.0)	4.75 (+0.6)	6.13 (+1.5)	5.90 (+1.1)	x	5.79 w (+3.3)	6.13 (+1.5 m/s)	
4	Maria Barbosa de Souza	Brazil	6.10 (+0.4)	x	x	6.08 w (+3.2)	5.94 (+0.1)	6.00 (+0.8)	6.10 (+0.4 m/s)	
5	Mónica Castro	Chile	5.56 (+0.3)	5.78 (+0.1)	5.60 (+1.1)	5.75 w (+2.6)	5.86 w (+2.1)	5.70 (+0.2)	5.86 w (+2.1 m/s)	
6	Mónica Falcioni	Uruguay	5.82 (+1.4)	5.79 (+2.0)	5.67 (+0.8)	5.73 (+1.4)	5.81 (+0.8)	5.76 (+1.6)	5.82 (+1.4 m/s)	
7	Alejandra Monza	Uruguay	x	5.02 w (+3.8)	4.89 (+0.4)	x	5.16 (+1.9)	5.31 (+0.8)	5.31 (+0.8 m/s)	

=== Triple jump ===
Final – 30 October

Rank	Name	Nationality	Attempts						Result	Notes
Rank	Name	Nationality	1	2	3	4	5	6	Result	Notes
1st place, gold medalist(s)	Andrea Ávila	Argentina	12.78 (-1.1)	x	12.83 (+0.4)	13.07 (+1.0)	x	13.18 (+2.0)	13.18 (+2.0 m/s)	
2nd place, silver medalist(s)	Luciana Alves dos Santos	Brazil	x	x	12.81 (+1.0)	12.87 (+1.6)	x	12.90 w (+4.6)	12.90 w (+4.6 m/s)	
3rd place, bronze medalist(s)	Maria Barbosa de Souza	Brazil	12.09 (-0.4)	12.86 w (+3.7)	12.69 (-0.9)	12.83 (+1.3)	12.83 (-1.2)	x	12.86 w (+3.7 m/s)	
4	Lilia Aguirre	Argentina	12.56 (+1.6)	12.62 w (+3.0)	12.32 (+0.2)	12.50 (+1.8)	12.39 (+0.4)	x	12.62 w (+3.0 m/s)	
5	Sandra Friederich	Mexico	x	11.54 (-0.3)	12.02 (+1.9)	12.01 (+1.7)	12.17 w (+2.8)	12.16 (+1.6)	12.17 w (+2.8 m/s)	
6	Daisy Zereceda	Peru	x	x	x	x	11.65 (+0.6)	12.02 w (+2.8)	12.02 w (+2.8 m/s)	
7	Mónica Castro	Chile	x	x	11.62 (+1.3)	11.43 (-1.0)	11.35 (+2.0)	11.45 (+0.2)	11.62 (+1.3 m/s)	
8	Citlali Sainz	Mexico	x	x	x	x	11.38 (+0.4)	11.50 (+0.9)	11.50 (+0.9 m/s)	

=== Shot put ===
Final – 29 October

Rank	Name	Nationality	Attempts						Result	Notes
Rank	Name	Nationality	1	2	3	4	5	6	Result	Notes
1st place, gold medalist(s)	Herminia Fernández	Cuba	16.95	16.83	x	16.67	17.33	x	17.33	
2nd place, silver medalist(s)	Elisângela Adriano	Brazil	16.77	16.32	16.40	x	x	x	16.77	
3rd place, bronze medalist(s)	Margarita Ramos	Spain	16.39	16.36	16.33	x	15.66	15.91	16.39	
4	Alexandra Rodrigues Borges Amaro	Brazil	15.13	x	14.62	x	x	15.41	15.41	
5	Teresa Machado	Portugal	15.34	15.06	14.63	14.54	x	14.42	15.34	
6	Carmen Chalá	Ecuador	13.89	14.13	13.65	12.67	13.37	13.63	14.13	
7	Ana Carolina Vera	Argentina	x	x	12.32	x	13.45	13.12	13.45	
8	Rosa Peña	Peru	12.93	13.14	12.19	12.80	12.06	12.58	13.14	
9	Verónica Monzón	Guatemala	12.03	x	11.58				12.03	
10	Daniela Muñoz	Uruguay	11.64	11.27	x				11.64	

=== Discus throw ===
Final – 27 October

Rank	Name	Nationality	Attempts						Result	Notes
Rank	Name	Nationality	1	2	3	4	5	6	Result	Notes
1st place, gold medalist(s)	Teresa Machado	Portugal	55.50	61.20	58.48	58.88	57.52	58.52	61.20	
2nd place, silver medalist(s)	Liliana Martinelli	Argentina	56.18	x	x	x	x	x	56.18	
3rd place, bronze medalist(s)	Amelia Aparecida Moreira	Brazil	48.88	53.26	49.74	50.52	54.06	53.70	54.06	
4	Sonia Godall	Spain	x	52.66	52.10	50.12	x	50.54	52.66	
5	Ángeles Barreiro	Spain	49.80	x	50.14	52.64	x	51.78	52.64	
6	Elisângela Adriano	Brazil	x	x	50.20	x	x	x	50.20	
7	Marisela Brestec	Cuba	x	49.84	x	x	x	x	49.84	
8	Carmen Chalá	Ecuador	48.90	x	47.42	45.14	x	x	48.90	
9	Eva María Dimas	El Salvador	38.32	36.88	41.64				41.64	
10	Sadith Fretes	Paraguay	41.12	x	39.24				41.12	
11	Verónica Monzón	Guatemala	x	x	34.48				34.48	

=== Hammer throw ===
Final – 30 October

Rank	Name	Nationality	Attempts						Result	Notes
Rank	Name	Nationality	1	2	3	4	5	6	Result	Notes
1st place, gold medalist(s)	María Eugenia Villamizar	Colombia	52.38	52.94	55.70	52.26	x	51.92	55.70	
2nd place, silver medalist(s)	Zulma Lambert	Argentina	43.60	42.18	x	51.66	50.10	x	51.66	
3rd place, bronze medalist(s)	Karina Moya	Argentina	50.56	x	50.26	48.00	49.86	49.40	50.56	
4	Susana Reguela	Spain	x	44.74	x	44.66	50.50	47.66	50.50	
5	Norbi Balantén	Cuba	x	x	41.62	47.86	x	44.00	47.86	
6	Lidia de la Cruz	Mexico	46.82	x	47.48	x	x	40.30	47.48	
7	Sonia Godall	Spain	x	45.00	44.00	45.10	x	46.62	46.62	
8	Maria Inês Pacheco	Brazil	39.90	40.00	39.36	42.10	42.44	42.52	42.52	
9	Eva María Dimas	El Salvador	30.12	x	32.62				32.62	
10	Sandra Guzmán	Uruguay	x	31.38	x				31.38	

=== Javelin throw ===
Final – 28 October

Rank	Name	Nationality	Attempts						Result	Notes
Rank	Name	Nationality	1	2	3	4	5	6	Result	Notes
1st place, gold medalist(s)	Sueli Pereira dos Santos	Brazil	x	65.96	62.76	x	x	56.82	65.96	
2nd place, silver medalist(s)	Sonia Bisset	Cuba	x	x	53.58	55.06	57.70	57.38	57.70	
3rd place, bronze medalist(s)	Idoia Mariezkurrena	Spain	49.16	49.90	x	x	49.10	48.54	49.90	
4	Cristina Larrea	Spain	49.84	49.52	46.04	x	x	x	49.84	
5	Carla Maria de Souza Bispo	Brazil	x	48.20	x	48.34	45.44	48.12	48.34	
6	Mariela Arch	Argentina	x	44.40	47.60	45.48	x	43.90	47.60	
7	Silvina Médici	Argentina	46.42	45.32	46.60	46.08	46.50	x	46.60	
8	Daniela Muñoz	Uruguay	44.90	45.70	44.24	43.42	46.52	x	46.52	
9	Zorobabelia Córdoba	Colombia	–	–	44.58				44.58	
10	Zoila Graciela Ayala	Paraguay	41.44	42.46	x				42.46	

=== Heptathlon ===
Final – 28–29 October

The highest mark recorded in each event is highlighted in yellow

Rank	Name	Nationality	100m H	HJ	SP	200m	LJ	JT	800m	Points	Notes
1st place, gold medalist(s)	Yolaida Pompa	Cuba	14.89 (-3.4)	1.68	12.40	27.17 w (+4.0)	5.41 (+0.4)	48.94	2:22.92	5.370	
2nd place, silver medalist(s)	Zorobabelia Córdoba	Colombia	14.65 (-3.4)	1.56	12.49	26.19 w (+4.0)	5.23 w (+2.3)	50.90	2:32.01	5.234^{‡}	
3rd place, bronze medalist(s)	Imma Clopés	Spain	14.98 (-3.4)	1.68	12.46	27.21 w (+4.0)	5.77 w (+3.6)	36.32	2:26.64	5.173	
4	Mariela Karina Andrade	Argentina	14.84 (-3.4)	1.77	10.52	26.46 w (+4.0)	5.62 (+0.8)	29.54	2:22.91	5.112	
5	Claudia Casals	Argentina	14.91 (-3.4)	1.71	9.91	27.95 w (+4.0)	5.44 (+0.7)	30.66	2:32.01	4.720	

^{‡}: It is reported that the result of Zorobabelia Córdoba should be corrected to 5.221 pts, because the 800m time of 2:32.01 corresponds to 668 pts rather than 681 pts.

=== 10,000 meters walk ===
Final – 28 October

Rank	Name	Nationality	Time	Notes
1st place, gold medalist(s)	Francisca Martínez	Mexico	47:01.80	
2nd place, silver medalist(s)	Miriam Ramón	Ecuador	47:01.83	
3rd place, bronze medalist(s)	Liliana Bermeo	Colombia	47:06.76	
4	María de la Luz Colín	Mexico	47:07.66	
5	Giovana Morejón	Bolivia	49:53.31	
6	Lidia Carriego	Argentina	53:48.78	

=== 4 × 100 meters relay ===
Final – 27 October

Rank	Nation	Competitors	Time	Notes
1st place, gold medalist(s)	Colombia	Elia Mera; Ximena Restrepo; Patricia Rodríguez; Mirtha Brock	44.87	
2nd place, silver medalist(s)	Brazil	Cleide Amaral; Kátia Regina de Jesús Santos; Vânia Amorim dos Santos; Tatiana Orcy	46.03	
3rd place, bronze medalist(s)	Chile	Carmen Gloria Bezanilla; Lisette Rondón; Marcela Barros; Mónica Castro	46.22	
4	Argentina	Andrea Ávila; Olga Conte; Virginia Lebreo; Daniela Lebreo	46.97	
5	Uruguay	Marcela Tiscornia; Claudia Acerenza; Rocio Cabrera^{†} Alejandra Monza	47.01	
6	Cuba	Yolaida Pompa; Odalys Hernández; Damarys Anderson; Idalia Hechavarría	47.03	

^{†}: Only the last name is known. The full name was assigned tentatively.

=== 4 × 400 meters relay ===
Final – 30 October

Rank	Nation	Competitors	Time	Notes
1st place, gold medalist(s)	Colombia	Patricia Rodríguez; Elia Mera; Flor Robledo; Ximena Restrepo	3:35.35	
2nd place, silver medalist(s)	Brazil	Maria Magnólia Souza Figueiredo; Rosângela de Souza Oliveira; Edinilza Ferreira de Lima; Marlene Moreira da Silva	3:38.61	
3rd place, bronze medalist(s)	Chile	Marcela Barros; Lisette Rondón; Carmen Gloria Bezanilla; Sara Montecinos	3:41.40	
4	Uruguay	Marcela Tiscornia; Inés Justet; Soledad Acerenza; Claudia Acerenza	3:46.24	
5	Argentina	María Gabriela Fornaciari; Marta Orellana; Daniela Lebreo; Sandra Izquierdo	3:46.83	
6	Cuba	Idalia Hechavarría; Odalys Hernández; Yolaida Pompa; Odalmis Limonta	3:50.00	
