= 1992 World Junior Championships in Athletics – Men's 110 metres hurdles =

The men's 110 metres hurdles event at the 1992 World Junior Championships in Athletics was held in Seoul, South Korea, at Olympic Stadium on 17 and 18 September. 106.7 cm (3'6) (senior implement) hurdles were used.

== Medalists ==
Gold	Yevgeniy Pechonkin; Commonwealth of Independent States
Silver	Sven Göhler; Germany
Bronze	Igor Pintusevich-Babichev; Commonwealth of Independent States

== Results ==
=== Final ===
18 September
Wind: +1.6 m/s

Rank	Name	Nationality	Time	Notes
1st place, gold medalist(s)	Yevgeniy Pechonkin	Commonwealth of Independent States	13.87	
2nd place, silver medalist(s)	Sven Göhler	Germany	13.98	
3rd place, bronze medalist(s)	Igor Pintusevich-Babichev	Commonwealth of Independent States	14.08	
4	Robin Korving	Netherlands	14.11	
5	Li Qiang	China	14.28	
6	Neil Owen	United Kingdom	14.35	
7	Tibor Bédi	Hungary	14.43	
8	Miguel de los Santos	Spain	14.58	

=== Semifinals ===
17 September

==== Semifinal 1 ====
Wind: +0.1 m/s

Rank	Name	Nationality	Time	Notes
1	Yevgeniy Pechonkin	Commonwealth of Independent States	14.12	Q
2	Sven Göhler	Germany	14.21	Q
3	Robin Korving	Netherlands	14.39	Q
4	Tibor Bédi	Hungary	14.42	Q
5	Reginald Barnes-Smith	United States	14.43	
6	Jonathan N'Senga	Belgium	14.62	
7	Emerson Perin	Brazil	14.98	
	Laszlo Sarucan	Romania	DNF	

==== Semifinal 2 ====
Rank	Name	Nationality	Time	Notes
1	Neil Owen	United Kingdom	14.14	Q
2	Igor Pintusevich-Babichev	Commonwealth of Independent States	14.25	Q
3	Li Qiang	China	14.33	Q
4	Miguel de los Santos	Spain	14.62	Q
5	Kehinde Aladefa	Nigeria	14.68	
6	Manabu Tomita	Japan	14.84	
	Prodromos Katsantonis	Cyprus	DNF	
	Fredrik Lindberg	Sweden	DNF	

=== Heats ===
17 September

==== Heat 1 ====
Wind: +1.1 m/s

Rank	Name	Nationality	Time	Notes
1	Igor Pintusevich-Babichev	Commonwealth of Independent States	14.34	Q
2	Tibor Bédi	Hungary	14.35	Q
3	Reginald Barnes-Smith	United States	14.58	Q
4	Kostas Zachariou	Greece	14.79	
	Jermaine Thomas	Jamaica	DNF	

==== Heat 2 ====
Wind: +0.8 m/s

Rank	Name	Nationality	Time	Notes
1	Neil Owen	United Kingdom	14.19	Q
2	Manabu Tomita	Japan	14.32	Q
3	Fredrik Lindberg	Sweden	14.39	Q
4	Kehinde Aladefa	Nigeria	14.40	q
5	Li Qiang	China	14.56	q
6	Cleverson da Silva	Brazil	15.20	

==== Heat 3 ====
Wind: +0.5 m/s

Rank	Name	Nationality	Time	Notes
1	Sven Göhler	Germany	14.44	Q
2	Prodromos Katsantonis	Cyprus	14.56	Q
3	Jonathan N'Senga	Belgium	14.61	Q
4	Emerson Perin	Brazil	14.73	q
5	Sammy Biwott	Kenya	14.76	
6	Matthew Fuller	United States	15.48	

==== Heat 4 ====
Wind: +0.3 m/s

Rank	Name	Nationality	Time	Notes
1	Yevgeniy Pechonkin	Commonwealth of Independent States	14.29	Q
2	Robin Korving	Netherlands	14.38	Q
3	Miguel de los Santos	Spain	14.64	Q
4	Laszlo Sarucan	Romania	14.65	q
5	O Seong-Un	South Korea	14.80	
6	César Jongitud	Mexico	15.29	
	Takashi Ichikawa	Japan	DNF	

== Participation ==
According to an unofficial count, 24 athletes from 20 countries participated in the event.

- Belgium (1)
- Brazil (2)
- China (1)
- Commonwealth of Independent States (2)
- Cyprus (1)
- Germany (1)
- Greece (1)
- Hungary (1)
- Jamaica (1)
- Japan (2)
- Kenya (1)
- Mexico (1)
- Netherlands (1)
- Nigeria (1)
- Romania (1)
- South Korea (1)
- Spain (1)
- Sweden (1)
- United Kingdom (1)
- United States (2)
