= Aristov =

Aristov, feminine: Aristova may be either a Russian surname originated in clergy, derived from the Greek word Hebrew: ἄριστος, 'the best' or a patronymic surname derived from the given name Arist (Aristos), of the same Greek origin. Notable people with this surname include:

- Averky Aristov (1903–1973), Soviet politician and diplomat
- Boris Aristov (1923–2018), Soviet politician and diplomat
- Nikolai Aristov (1847–1910), Russian turkologist
- Viktor Aristov (director) (1943–1994), Soviet film director and screenwriter
- Viktor Aristov (footballer) (1938–2023), Ukrainian football manager
- Yuriy Aristov (politician), (born 1975), Ukrainian politician
- Yury Aristov (born 1973), Uzbekistani hurdler
