= 13 anys i un dia =

- Genre: Sitcom
- Developed by: Televisió de Catalunya
- Directed by: Jesús Font
- Starring: Joan Pera; Roger Pera; Carmen Balagué; Lluís Marco; Alicia González Laá; Eva de Luis
- Country of origin: Spain
- Original language: Catalan
- No. of seasons: 2
- No. of episodes: 24

Production
- Camera setup: Multi-camera
- Running time: 25-30 minutes approx.

Original release
- Network: TV3
- Release: January 15, 2008 – March 19, 2009

13 anys i un dia (English: 13 years and one day) was a Catalan sitcom which was broadcast on TV3 at Thursday nights. 24 episodes were aired between 2008 and 2009. It was produced by Televisió de Catalunya and directed by Jesús Font.

== Cast ==
- Joan Pera
- Roger Pera
- Carmen Balagué
- Lluís Marco
- Alicia González Laá
- Eva de Luis
- José Luis Adserías
