= 1996 European Athletics Indoor Championships – Men's 60 metres hurdles =

The men's 60 metres hurdles event at the 1996 European Athletics Indoor Championships was held in Stockholm Globe Arena on 9 March.

== Medalists ==
| Gold | Silver | Bronze |
|---|---|---|
| Igors Kazanovs; Latvia | Guntis Peders; Latvia | Jonathan N'Senga; Belgium |

== Results ==
=== Heats ===
First 2 from each heat (Q) and the next 2 fastest (q) qualified for the semifinals.

| Rank | Heat | Name | Nationality | Time | Notes |
|---|---|---|---|---|---|
| 1 | 4 | Guntis Peders | Latvia | 7.72 | Q |
| 2 | 1 | Herwig Röttl | Austria | 7.75 | Q |
| 2 | 1 | Vladimir Belokon | Ukraine | 7.75 | Q |
| 2 | 5 | Johan Lisabeth | Belgium | 7.75 | Q |
| 2 | 5 | Falk Balzer | Germany | 7.75 | Q |
| 6 | 3 | Stelios Bisbas | Greece | 7.76 | Q |
| 7 | 1 | Jonathan N'Senga | Belgium | 7.77 | q |
| 8 | 1 | Carlos Sala | Spain | 7.78 | q |
| 9 | 2 | Igors Kazanovs | Latvia | 7.82 | Q |
| 10 | 4 | Elmar Lichtenegger | Austria | 7.83 | Q |
| 11 | 4 | Claude Edorh | Germany | 7.88 | |
| 12 | 4 | Claus Hirsbro | Denmark | 7.91 | |
| 12 | 5 | Thomas Kearns | Ireland | 7.91 | |
| 14 | 2 | Artur Kohutek | Poland | 7.93 | Q |
| 14 | 5 | Raphael Monachon | Switzerland | 7.93 | |
| 16 | 4 | Igor Borisov | Belarus | 7.94 | |
| 17 | 2 | Mircea Oaidă | Romania | 7.95 | |
| 18 | 3 | Andrey Kislykh | Russia | 7.96 | Q |
| 19 | 2 | Stamatis Mangos | Greece | 7.99 | |
| 20 | 3 | Aleksandr Yenko | Moldova | 8.02 | |
| 21 | 3 | Frank Asselman | Belgium | 8.09 | |
| 22 | 1 | Prodromos Katsantonis | Cyprus | 8.12 | |
| 23 | 2 | Sean Cahill | Ireland | 8.16 | |
| | 3 | Sven Göhler | Germany | DQ | |
| | 5 | Ruhan Işım | Turkey | DNS | |

=== Semifinals ===
First 3 from each semifinal qualified directly (Q) for the final.

| Rank | Heat | Name | Nationality | Time | Notes |
|---|---|---|---|---|---|
| 1 | 1 | Igors Kazanovs | Latvia | 7.65 | Q |
| 2 | 1 | Falk Balzer | Germany | 7.70 | Q |
| 2 | 2 | Guntis Peders | Latvia | 7.70 | Q |
| 2 | 2 | Jonathan N'Senga | Belgium | 7.70 | Q |
| 5 | 2 | Andrey Kislykh | Russia | 7.74 | Q |
| 6 | 2 | Elmar Lichtenegger | Austria | 7.74 | |
| 7 | 1 | Johan Lisabeth | Belgium | 7.77 | Q |
| 7 | 2 | Vladimir Belokon | Ukraine | 7.77 | |
| 9 | 2 | Stelios Bisbas | Greece | 7.82 | |
| 10 | 1 | Carlos Sala | Spain | 8.10 | |
| 11 | 1 | Artur Kohutek | Poland | 8.24 | |
| | 1 | Herwig Röttl | Austria | DNS | |

=== Final ===
| Rank | Name | Nationality | Time | Notes |
|---|---|---|---|---|
| 1st place, gold medalist(s) | Igors Kazanovs | Latvia | 7.59 | |
| 2nd place, silver medalist(s) | Guntis Peders | Latvia | 7.65 | PB |
| 3rd place, bronze medalist(s) | Jonathan N'Senga | Belgium | 7.66 | |
| 4 | Falk Balzer | Germany | 7.67 | |
| 5 | Andrey Kislykh | Russia | 7.72 | |
| 6 | Johan Lisabeth | Belgium | 7.78 | |
