= 1994 European Athletics Championships – Men's 110 metres hurdles =

Men's 110 metres hurdles at the European Athletics Championships

These are the official results of the Men's 110 metres hurdles event at the 1994 European Championships in Helsinki, Finland, held at Helsinki Olympic Stadium on 11 and 12 August 1994.

== Medalists ==
| Gold | Colin Jackson; United Kingdom |
| Silver | Florian Schwarthoff; Germany |
| Bronze | Tony Jarrett; United Kingdom |

== Final ==
- Held on 12 August 1994

Wind: 1.1 m/s

| Rank | Final | Time |
|---|---|---|
| | Colin Jackson (GBR) | 13.08 |
| | Florian Schwarthoff (GER) | 13.16 |
| | Tony Jarrett (GBR) | 13.23 |
| 4. | Claude Edorh (GER) | 13.41 |
| 5. | Mike Fenner (GER) | 13.53 |
| 6. | Antti Haapakoski (FIN) | 13.54 |
| 7. | Dan Philibert (FRA) | 13.54 |
| 8. | Gheorghe Boroi (ROM) | 13.61 |

== Semifinals ==
- Held on 12 August 1994

Wind: 1.0 m/s

| Rank | Heat 1 | Time |
|---|---|---|
| 1. | Colin Jackson (GBR) | 13.04 (CR) |
| 2. | Dan Philibert (FRA) | 13.45 |
| 3. | Gheorghe Boroi (ROM) | 13.53 |
| 4. | Mike Fenner (GER) | 13.55 |
| 5. | Andy Tulloch (GBR) | 13.62 |
| 6. | Jonathan N'Senga (BEL) | 13.69 |
| 7. | Jyrki Kähkönen (FIN) | 13.73 |
| — | Mark McKoy (AUT) | DNS |

Wind: 0.1 m/s

| Rank | Heat 2 | Time |
|---|---|---|
| 1. | Tony Jarrett (GBR) | 13.31 |
| 2. | Florian Schwarthoff (GER) | 13.32 |
| 3. | Claude Edorh (GER) | 13.47 |
| 4. | Antti Haapakoski (FIN) | 13.52 |
| 5. | Laurent Ottoz (ITA) | 13.53 |
| 6. | Thomas Kearns (IRL) | 13.60 |
| 7. | Kai Kyllönen (FIN) | 13.63 |
| 8. | Niklas Eriksson (SWE) | 13.67 |

== Qualifying heats ==
- Held on 11 August 1994

Wind: 0.7 m/s

| Rank | Heat 1 | Time |
|---|---|---|
| 1. | Florian Schwarthoff (GER) | 13.31 |
| 2. | Laurent Ottoz (ITA) | 13.52 |
| 3. | Thomas Kearns (IRL) | 13.60 |
| 4. | Claes Albihn (SWE) | 13.72 |
| 5. | Igor Kováč (SVK) | 13.72 |
| 6. | Tibor Bédi (HUN) | 13.94 |
| 7. | Gunnar Schrör (SUI) | 13.98 |
| — | Igors Kazanovs (LAT) | DNS |

Wind: 1.5 m/s

| Rank | Heat 2 | Time |
|---|---|---|
| 1. | Colin Jackson (GBR) | 13.16 (CR) |
| 2. | Dan Philibert (FRA) | 13.43 |
| 3. | Mike Fenner (GER) | 13.49 |
| 4. | Niklas Eriksson (SWE) | 13.65 |
| 5. | Kai Kyllönen (FIN) | 13.67 |
| 6. | Mikhail Ryabukhin (BLR) | 13.87 |
| 7. | Levente Csillag (HUN) | 14.02 |
| 8. | Guntis Peders (LAT) | 15.57 |

Wind: 1.3 m/s

| Rank | Heat 3 | Time |
|---|---|---|
| 1. | Mark McKoy (AUT) | 13.50 |
| 2. | Andy Tulloch (GBR) | 13.52 |
| 3. | Claude Edorh (GER) | 13.53 |
| 4. | Gheorghe Boroi (ROM) | 13.64 |
| 5. | Jyrki Kähkönen (FIN) | 13.65 |
| 6. | Hubert Grossard (BEL) | 13.67 |
| 7. | Mathieu Jouÿs (FRA) | 13.78 |
| 8. | Sean Cahill (IRL) | 14.16 |

Wind: -0.1 m/s

| Rank | Heat 4 | Time |
|---|---|---|
| 1. | Tony Jarrett (GBR) | 13.43 |
| 2. | Antti Haapakoski (FIN) | 13.49 |
| 3. | Jonathan N'Senga (BEL) | 13.66 |
| 4. | Gaute Melby Gundersen (NOR) | 13.77 |
| 5. | Vincent Clarico (FRA) | 13.81 |
| 6. | Patrik Torkelsson (SWE) | 13.85 |
| 7. | Robin Korving (NED) | 14.31 |
| — | Vladimir Belokon (UKR) | DNF |

== Participation ==
According to an unofficial count, 31 athletes from 18 countries participated in the event.

- Austria (1)
- Belarus (1)
- Belgium (2)
- Finland (3)
- France (3)
- Germany (3)
- Hungary (2)
- Ireland (2)
- Italy (1)
- Latvia (1)
- Netherlands (1)
- Norway (1)
- Romania (1)
- Slovakia (1)
- Sweden (3)
- Switzerland (1)
- Ukraine (1)
- United Kingdom (3)

== See also ==
- 1990 Men's European Championships 110m Hurdles (Split)
- 1991 Men's World Championships 110m Hurdles (Tokyo)
- 1992 Men's Olympic 110m Hurdles (Barcelona)
- 1993 Men's World Championships 110m Hurdles (Stuttgart)
- 1995 Men's World Championships 110m Hurdles (Gothenburg)
- 1996 Men's Olympic 110m Hurdles (Atlanta)
- 1997 Men's World Championships 110m Hurdles (Athens)
- 1998 Men's European Championships 110m Hurdles (Budapest)
