= Miguel de los Santos =

Miguel de los Santos may refer to:

- Miguel de los Santos Álvarez (1817–1892), Spanish writer
- Miguel de los Santos (athlete), competitor for Spain at the 1996 Summer Olympics
- Miguel de los Santos (broadcaster) (born 1936), commentator for Spain in the Eurovision Song Contest

== See also ==
- Miguel Santos (disambiguation), multiple people
