= José Riesco =

Peruvian hurdler

Personal information
- Nationality: Peruvian
- Born: 27 February 1976 (age 50)

Sport
- Sport: Track and field
- Event: 110 metres hurdles

José Riesco (born 27 February 1976) is a Peruvian hurdler. He competed in the men's 110 metres hurdles at the 1996 Summer Olympics.
