= Sean Cahill =

Irish hurdler

Personal information
- Born: 26 April 1967 (age 58)
- Height: 1.90 m (6 ft 3 in)
- Weight: 82 kg (181 lb)

Sport
- Sport: Athletics
- Event(s): 110 m hurdles, 60 m hurdles
- Club: Cushinstown

Seán Cahill (born 26 April 1967) is an Irish former athlete who specialised in the high hurdles. He represented his country at the 1996 Summer Olympics as well as two World Championships.

His personal bests are 13.66 seconds in the 110 metres hurdles (-1.6 m/s, Sestriere 1993) and 8.16 seconds in the 60 metres hurdles (Stockholm 1996).

== Personal life ==
He married Irish national record holder and international long jumper, Terri Hogan, who competed at the 1993 World Athletics Championships. They have children Killian, Niamh and Ciaran.

== International competitions ==
Year	Competition	Venue	Position	Event	Notes
Representing Ireland
1993	World Championships	Stuttgart, Germany	20th (sf)	110 m hurdles	13.84
1994	European Championships	Helsinki, Finland	28th (h)	110 m hurdles	14.16
1995	World Championships	Gothenburg, Sweden	46th (h)	110 m hurdles	14.33
1996	European Indoor Championships	Stockholm, Sweden	23rd (h)	60 m hurdles	8.16
1996	Olympic Games	Atlanta, United States	53rd (h)	110 m hurdles	14.28
