= Andrew Tulloch =

English athlete (born 1967)

Andy Tulloch
Personal information
- Nationality: British (English)
- Born: 1 April 1967 (age 58) Wolverhampton, England
- Height: 186 cm (6 ft 1 in)
- Weight: 79 kg (174 lb)

Sport
- Sport: Athletics
- Event: Hurdles
- Club: Belgrave Harriers

Andrew George Tulloch (born 1 April 1967) is a male English retired athlete who specialised in the 110 metres hurdles and competed at the 1996 Summer Olympics.

== Biography ==
At the 1996 Olympic Games in Atlanta, Tulloch represented Great Britain in the 10 metres hurdles event.

Tulloch also represented Great Britain at three consecutive World Championships, starting in 1993 and was a double British 110 metres hurdles champion after winning the British AAA Championships title at the 1994 AAA Championships and the UK Athletics Championships title in 1993.

He represented England in the 110 metres hurdles event, at the 1994 Commonwealth Games in Victoria, Canada. Four years later he represented England in the 110 metres hurdles event again, at the 1998 Commonwealth Games in Kuala Lumpur, Malaysia.

He has personal bests of 13.49 seconds in the 110 metres hurdles (Oslo 1999) and 7.55 seconds in the 60 metres hurdles (Valencia 1998).

== Competition record ==
Year	Competition	Venue	Position	Event	Notes
Representing Great Britain and England
1993	World Indoor Championships	Toronto, Canada	23rd (h)	60 m hurdles	7.97
1993	World Championships	Stuttgart, Germany	19th (sf)	110 m hurdles	13.79
1994	European Championships	Helsinki, Finland	11th (sf)	110 m hurdles	13.62
1994	Commonwealth Games	Victoria, Canada	4th	110 m hurdles	13.69
1995	World Championships	Gothenburg, Sweden	13th (sf)	110 m hurdles	13.62
1996	Olympic Games	Atlanta, United States	24th (qf)	110 m hurdles	13.68
1997	World Championships	Athens, Greece	23rd (qf)	110 m hurdles	13.63
1998	European Indoor Championships	Valencia, Spain	7th	60 m hurdles	7.66
1998	European Championships	Budapest, Hungary	14th (sf)	110 m hurdles	13.79
1998	Commonwealth Games	Kuala Lumpur, Malaysia	6th	110 m hurdles	13.67
