= Yeniya Shorokhov =

Kyrgyzstani hurdler

Personal information
- Nationality: Kyrgyzstani
- Born: 24 August 1974 (age 51)

Sport
- Sport: Track and field
- Event: 110 metres hurdles

Yeniya Shorokhov (born 24 August 1974) is a Kyrgyzstani former hurdler. He competed in the men's 110 metres hurdles at the 1996 Summer Olympics.
