= Fawaz Ismail Johar =

Bahraini hurdler

Personal information
- Nationality: Bahraini
- Born: 16 October 1976 (age 49)

Sport
- Sport: Track and field
- Event: 110 metres hurdles

Fawaz Ismail Johar (born 16 October 1976) is a Bahraini hurdler. He competed in the men's 110 metres hurdles at the 1996 Summer Olympics.
