= Sidney de Souza (athlete) =

Brazilian sprinter

Sidney Telles de Souza
Personal information
- Born: 26 July 1966 (age 60) Santo André, Brazil
- Height: 183 cm (6 ft 0 in)
- Weight: 65 kg (143 lb)

Sport
- Sport: Sprinting
- Events: 200 m, 400 m
- Club: ADCEG

Sidney Telles de Souza (born July 26, 1966) is a Brazilian sprinter. He competed in the men's 200 metres at the 1992 Summer Olympics.

== International competitions ==
Year	Competition	Venue	Position	Event	Notes
Representing Brazil
1989	South American Championships	Medellín, Colombia	2nd	4 × 400 m relay	3:06.33
1992	Ibero-American Championships	Seville, Spain	1st	400 m	45.38
1992	Ibero-American Championships	Seville, Spain	2nd	4 × 400 m relay	3:03.50
1992	Olympic Games	Barcelona, Spain	15th (sf)	200 m	20.88
1992	Olympic Games	Barcelona, Spain	16th (qf)	400 m	45.55
1992	Olympic Games	Barcelona, Spain	4th	4 × 400 m relay	3:01.61
1993	World Indoor Championships	Toronto, Canada	15th (h)	200 m	21.30
1993	World Championships	Stuttgart, Germany	30th (qf)	100 m	21.69
1994	Ibero-American Championships	Seville, Spain	2nd	400 m	47.50
1994	Ibero-American Championships	Seville, Spain	2nd	4 × 100 m relay	40.53
1994	Ibero-American Championships	Seville, Spain	1st	4 × 400 m relay	3:06.54
1995	World Championships	Gothenburg, Sweden	55th (h)	100 m	10.63
1995	World Championships	Gothenburg, Sweden	6th	4 × 100 m relay	39.35
1997	South American Championships	Mar del Plata, Argentina	3rd	200 m	21.32
1997	South American Championships	Mar del Plata, Argentina	1st	4 × 100 m relay	40.07

== Personal bests ==
Outdoor

- 100 metres – 10.27 (Rio de Janeiro 1997)
- 200 metres – 20.02 (-0.2 m/s, São Paulo 1993)
- 400 metres – 45.38 (Seville 1992)

Outdoor

- 200 metres – 21.30 (Toronto 1993)
