= Levente Csillag =

Hungarian hurdler (1973-)

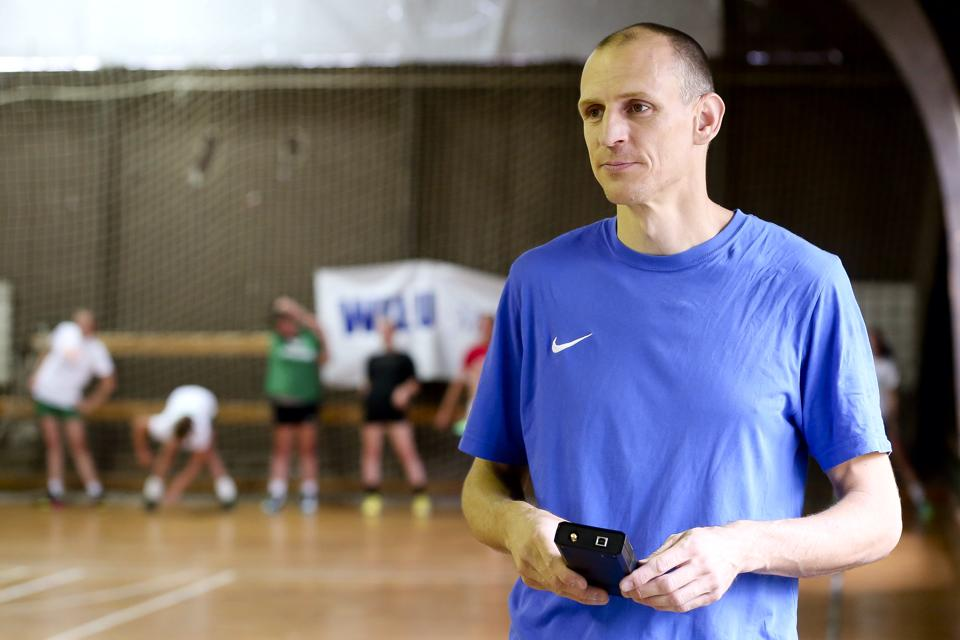
- Levente Csillag in Budapest 2014.

Personal information
- Nationality: Hungarian
- Born: March 22, 1973 (age 52) Veszprém, Hungary
- Height: 1.89 m (6 ft 2 in)

Sport
- Country: Hungary
- Sport: Hurdling

Levente Csillag (born 22 March 1973) is a retired Hungarian hurdler who specialized in the 110 metres hurdles. He was born in Veszprém.

== Career ==
He competed at the 1994 European Championships, the 1995 World Championships, the 1996 Olympic Games, the 1997 World Championships, the 1998 European Indoor Championships, the 2000 European Indoor Championships, the 2000 Olympic Games, the 2002 European Championships and the 2004 Olympic Games without reaching the final.

He became Hungarian national champion in 1993, 1994, 1995, 1996, 1997, 1999, 2000, 2001, 2002 and 2004. His dominance over Hungarian hurdling was precedented by György Bakos, who won twelve times in a row between 1980 and 1991. He became Hungarian indoor champion only once, in 1998.

His personal best time is 13.44 seconds, achieved in August 1997 in Leverkusen. This was the Hungarian record for some years, but he has since been surpassed by Dániel Kiss.
