= Paul Tucker (athlete) =

Guyanese hurdler

Personal information
- Nationality: Guyanese
- Born: 30 January 1976 (age 50)

Sport
- Sport: Track and field
- Event: 110 metres hurdles

Paul Tucker (born 30 January 1976) is a Guyanese hurdler. He competed in the men's 110 metres hurdles at the 1996 Summer Olympics.
