= Frank Boateng (hurdler) =

Ghanaian hurdler

Personal information
- Nationality: Ghanaian
- Born: 11 May 1974 (age 52)

Sport
- Sport: Track and field
- Event: 110 metres hurdles

Frank Boateng (born 11 May 1974), also known as Frank Mensah, is a Ghanaian hurdler. He competed in the men's 110 metres hurdles at the 1996 Summer Olympics.

Mensah competed for the Nebraska Cornhuskers track and field and South Carolina Gamecocks track and field teams in the NCAA.
