= Fernando Moreno =

Argentine high jumper

Personal information
- Full name: Fernando Nicolás Moreno
- Nationality: Argentine
- Born: 2 August 1967 (age 58)

Sport
- Sport: Athletics
- Event: High jump

Fernando Nicolás Moreno (born 2 August 1967) is an Argentine retired athlete who specialised in the high jump. He represented his country at the 1991 World Championships in Tokyo without qualifying for the final.

His personal best in the event is 2.24 metres set in Buenos Aires in 1993.

== International competitions ==
Year	Competition	Venue	Position	Event	Notes
Representing Argentina
1985	South American Junior Championships	Santa Fe, Argentina	2nd	Pole vault	4.00 m
1986	South American Junior Championships	Quito, Ecuador	2nd	High jump	2.12 m
1986	South American Junior Championships	Quito, Ecuador	4th	Pole vault	4.20 m
1987	South American Championships	São Paulo, Brazil	1st	High jump	2.17 m
1987	South American Championships	São Paulo, Brazil	4th	Pole vault	4.60 m
1988	Ibero-American Championships	Mexico City, Mexico	5th	High jump	2.20 m
1990	Ibero-American Championships	Manaus, Brazil	5th	High jump	2.15 m
1990	South American Games	Lima, Peru	1st	High jump	2.15 m
1991	South American Championships	Manaus, Brazil	2nd	High jump	2.17 m
1991	World Championships	Tokyo, Japan	–	High jump	NM
1992	Ibero-American Championships	Seville, Spain	5th	High jump	2.14 m
1993	South American Championships	Lima, Peru	2nd	High jump	2.16 m
1994	Ibero-American Championships	Mar del Plata, Argentina	3rd	High jump	2.20 m
1995	Pan American Games	Mar del Plata, Argentina	7th	High jump	2.10 m
1995	South American Championships	Manaus, Brazil	3rd	High jump	2.15 m
1997	South American Championships	Mar del Plata, Argentina	4th	High jump	2.10 m
