= Wagner Marseille =

Haitian hurdler (born 1970)

Personal information
- Born: 13 September 1970 (age 55)

Sport
- Sport: Track and field
Medal record
Representing Haiti
Central American and Caribbean Games
Silver medal – second place	1993 Ponce	110m hurdles

Wagner Marseille (born 13 September 1970) is a retired Haiti athlete who specialised in the 110 metres hurdles. He represented his country at the 1996 Summer Olympics, as well as three outdoor and two indoor World Championships.

Marseille competed for the Fairleigh Dickinson Knights track and field team in the NCAA. He later became superintendent of schools at the Cheltenham School District.

He has personal bests of 13.75 seconds in the 110 metres hurdles (Bridgetown 1999) and 7.70 seconds in the 60 metres hurdles (Blacksburg 2000).

== Competition record ==
Year	Competition	Venue	Position	Event	Notes
Representing Haiti
1993	World Championships	Stuttgart, Germany	35th (h)	110 m H	14.03
1993	Central American and Caribbean Games	Ponce, Puerto Rico	2nd	110 m H	14.10
1995	World Indoor Championships	Barcelona, Spain	28th (h)	60 m H	7.92
1995	Pan American Games	Mar del Plata, Argentina	8th	110 m H	14.30
1995	World Championships	Gothenburg, Sweden	41st (h)	110 m H	14.03
1995	Universiade	Fukuoka, Japan	7th	110 m H	13.78
1996	Olympic Games	Atlanta, United States	44th (h)	110 m H	13.95
1997	World Championships	Athens, Greece	42nd (h)	110 m H	14.52
1999	Central American and Caribbean Championships	Bridgetown, Barbados	3rd	110 m H	13.75
1999	Pan American Games	Winnipeg, Canada	11th (h)	110 m H	13.88
1999	Pan American Games	Winnipeg, Canada	9th (h)	4 × 100 m	41.55
2001	World Indoor Championships	Lisbon, Portugal	19th (h)	60 m H	7.90
