= Moses Oyiki =

Nigerian hurdler

Personal information
- Nationality: Nigerian
- Born: Moses Orode Oyiki; 1 June 1971 (age 55) Ibadan, Nigeria

Sport
- Sport: Track and field
- Event: 110 metres hurdles

Moses Oyiki (born 1 June 1971) is a Nigerian hurdler. He was the African champion in the 110 m hurdles at the African Championships in Cairo, Egypt in 1990. He competed in the men's 110 metres hurdles at the 1996 Summer Olympics. He came 5th in his heat in the first round. He now lives in the Republic of Ireland where he is a practicing solicitor with Aaron Solicitors.
