= Eugene Swift =

American hurdler

Personal information
- Born: Eugene D. Swift; September 14, 1964 (age 61) Oakland, California, United States

Sport
- Sport: Track and field
Medal record
Representing United States
Pan American Games
| Bronze medal – third place | 1999 Winnipeg | 110m hurdles |

Eugene D. Swift (born September 14, 1964) is an American retired hurdler.

He was born in Oakland, California. He finished sixth at the 1996 Olympic Games. At the 1999 Pan American Games he won the bronze medal in the 110 metres hurdles and finished fourth in the 4 × 100 metres relay.

His personal best time was 13.21 seconds, achieved three times. Indoors, in the 60 metre hurdles, he ran in 7.67 seconds in 1998.
