= Miguel Santos =

Miguel Santos may refer to:

== Sportspeople ==
- Miguel Santos (footballer) (born 1994), Portuguese football goalkeeper
- Miguel Santos Ruiz (born 1999), Spanish chess player
- Miguel Reina Santos (born 1946), Spanish retired footballer who played as a goalkeeper
- Miguel Santos Alfageme (born 1991), Spanish footballer playing for UD Logroñés

== Others ==
- Miguel Mihura Santos (1905–1977), Spanish playwright
- Miguel Santos (actor) (fl. 1930s), Cuban actor, see List of Cuban films

== Fictional characters ==
- Living Lightning (Miguel Santos), superhero

== See also ==
- Miguel de los Santos (disambiguation)
