= Erik Batte =

Cuban hurdler (born 1974)

Personal information
- Born: Erik Batte Herrera; December 10, 1974 (age 51) Sagua la Grande, Villa Clara, Cuba
Medal record
Representing Cuba
Central American and Caribbean Games
| Bronze medal – third place | 1998 Maracaibo | 110m hurdles |

Erik Batte Herrera (born 10 December 1974) is a retired Cuban hurdler.

He finished seventh at the 1995 World Championships, eighth at the 1996 Summer Olympics and third at the 1998 Central American and Caribbean Games.

His personal best time was 13.26 seconds, achieved in the semi-final at the 1996 Summer Olympics in Atlanta. The result places him sixth (joint with Yuniel Hernández) among Cuban 110 m hurdlers, behind Anier García, Dayron Robles, Emilio Valle, Alejandro Casañas and Yoel Hernández.

== Competition record ==
| Year | Competition | Venue | Position | Event | Notes |
Representing Cuba
| 1993 | Pan American Junior Championships | Winnipeg, Canada | 2nd | 110 m hurdles | 14.11 |
| 1993 | Central American and Caribbean Championships | Cali, Colombia | 1st | 110 m hurdles | 13.84 (w) |
| 1993 | Central American and Caribbean Championships | Cali, Colombia | 3rd | 4 × 100 m relay | 39.72 |
| 1994 | Ibero-American Championships | Mar del Plata, Argentina | 1st | 110m hurdles | 14.31 (wind: +2.0 m/s) |
| 1995 | World Indoor Championships | Barcelona, Spain | 14th (sf) | 60 m hurdles | 7.83 |
| 1995 | Pan American Games | Mar del Plata, Argentina | 4th | 110 m hurdles | 13.72 |
| 1995 | Central American and Caribbean Championships | Guatemala City, Guatemala | 1st | 110 m hurdles | 13.49 |
| 1995 | World Championships | Gothenburg, Sweden | 7th | 110 m hurdles | 13.38 |
| 1996 | Olympic Games | Atlanta, United States | 8th | 110 m hurdles | 13.43 |
| 1997 | Central American and Caribbean Championships | San Juan, Puerto Rico | 1st | 110 m hurdles | 13.70 (w) |
| 1998 | Ibero-American Championships | Lisbon, Portugal | 1st | 110 m hurdles | 13.54 |
| 1998 | Central American and Caribbean Games | Maracaibo, Venezuela | 3rd | 110 m hurdles | 13.84 |
| 1999 | World Championships | Seville, Spain | 9th (sf) | 110 m hurdles | 13.40 |
