= Steve Adegbite =

Nigerian hurdler (born 1972)

Personal information
- Nationality: Nigerian
- Born: 23 May 1972 (age 54)

Sport
- Sport: Track and field
- Event: 110 metres hurdles

Stephen Adebisi Gbadegesin Adegbite (born 23 May 1972) is a Nigerian hurdler. He competed in the men's 110 metres hurdles at the 1996 Summer Olympics.
