= Gheorghe Boroi =

Romanian hurdler

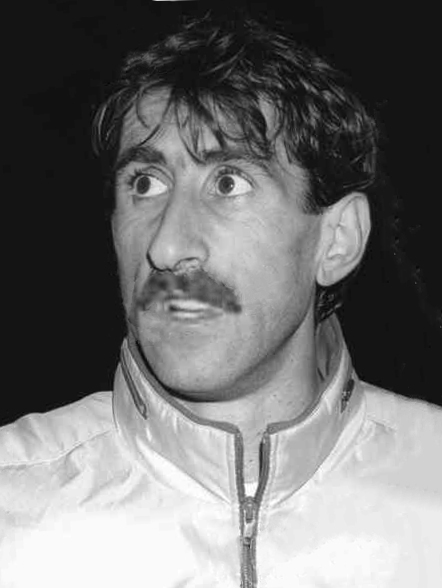
- Boroi in 1993

Personal information
- Born: 26 August 1964 (age 61) Berislăvești, Romania
- Height: 182 cm (6 ft 0 in)
- Weight: 71 kg (157 lb)

Sport
- Sport: Athletics
- Event(s): 60 m, 110 m hurdles

Achievements and titles
- Personal best(s): 60 mH – 7.50 (1994); 110 mH – 13.34 (1993)

Gheorghe Boroi (born 26 August 1964) is a retired hurdler from Romania. He competed in the 110 m event at the 1992 and 1996 Olympics, but failed to reach the finals. He won a silver medal at the 1994 European Indoor Championships in the 60 m hurdles.

== Achievements ==
Year	Competition	Venue	Position	Event	Notes
Representing Romania
1990	European Championships	Split, Yugoslavia	24th (h)	110m hurdles	14.39 (wind: -0.8 m/s)
1992	Olympic Games	Barcelona, Spain	DNQ	110m hurdles	13.82
1993	World Championships	Stuttgart, Germany	DNQ	110m hurdles	13.54
1994	European Indoor Championships	Paris, France	2nd	60m hurdles	7.57
1994	European Championships	Helsinki, Finland	8th	110m hurdles	13.61 (wind: +1.1 m/s)
1996	Olympic Games	Atlanta, United States	12th	110m hurdles	13.57
