= Yuriy Aristov =

Ukrainian politician

- Юрій Арістов
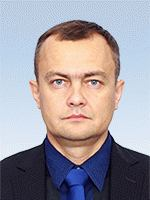

People's Deputy of Ukraine
- In office 29 August 2019 – 27 July 2023
- Constituency: Servant of the People, No. 42

Personal details
- Born: July 1, 1975 (age 50) Kyiv, Ukrainian SSR, Soviet Union
- Party: Servant of the People

Yuriy Aristov (Ukrainian: Юрій Арістов, born 1 July 1975) is a Ukrainian politician who previously served as a People's Deputy of Ukraine as the 42nd member of Verkhovna Rada. He was also a deputy chief of Ukraine's Committee of National Security, Defense, and Intelligence, and head of the Committee on Budget. He was elected in the 2019 election.

In July 2023, Aristov was in the focus of media attention, when it was discovered that earlier that month he was allowed to travel abroad to hold meetings in the Parliament of Lithuania. Subsequently, he claimed to have fallen ill and was on sick leave during the war, and then went with his family on a luxury holiday to the Maldives for two weeks. After this activity was discovered, a criminal investigation was opened against Aristov. Ukrainian men aged 18 to 60 are not allowed to leave Ukraine amid Russia's invasion, except for state-sanctioned trips. On 25 July 2023, Aristov requested to leave his position as an MP, on 27 July the Verkhovna Rada confirmed this decision and thereby deprived Aristov of his seat in parliament.
