= Eric Kaiser =

German athletics competitor

Personal information
- Nationality: German
- Born: 26 April 1971 (age 54) Yaoundé, Cameroon
- Height: 1.83 m (6 ft 0 in)
- Weight: 77 kg (170 lb)

Sport
- Sport: Athletics
- Event(s): 110 m hurdles, 60 m hurdles
- Club: MTG Mannheim

Eric Kaiser (born 7 March 1971) is a retired Cameroonian-born German athlete who specialised in the sprint hurdles. He represented his country at the 1996 Summer Olympics as well as two World Championships. Earlier in his career he competed in the decathlon.

His personal bests are 13.34 seconds in the 110 metres hurdles (-0.7 m/s, Duisburg 1995) and 7.65 seconds in the 60 metres hurdles (Stuttgart 1995).

In 1999 he tested positive for a banned substance, clenbuterol, and was suspended for two years.
