= Yury Aristov =

Uzbekistani hurdler

Personal information
- Nationality: Uzbekistani
- Born: 13 December 1973 (age 52)

Sport
- Sport: Track and field
- Event: 110 metres hurdles

Yury Aristov (born 13 December 1973) is an Uzbekistani hurdler. He competed in the men's 110 metres hurdles at the 1996 Summer Olympics.
