= Mickey Soto =

Puerto Rican hurdler

Personal information
- Nationality: Puerto Rican
- Born: 8 December 1967 (age 58)
- Height: 1.88 m (6 ft 2 in)
- Weight: 79 kg (174 lb)

Sport
- Sport: Track and field
- Event: 110 metres hurdles

Miguel "Mickey" Soto (born 8 December 1967) is a Puerto Rican hurdler. He competed in the men's 110 metres hurdles at the 1996 Summer Olympics.
