= Courtney Hawkins (hurdler) =

American hurdler (born 1967)

Personal information
- Born: July 11, 1967 (age 58) West Palm Beach, Florida
- Education: Kansas

Sport
- Country: USA
- Sport: Men's athletics
- University team: Kansas Jayhawks
Medal record
Pan American Games
Bronze medal – third place	1995 Mar del Plata	110 m hurdles
IAAF World Indoor Championships
Silver medal – second place	1995 Barcelona	60 m hurdles

Courtney Hawkins (born July 11, 1967) is an American former track and field athlete who competed in the sprint hurdles. He was a medallist at the Pan American Games and the IAAF World Indoor Championships in 1995. He holds personal bests of 13.17 seconds for the 110-meter hurdles and 7.41 seconds for the 60-meter hurdles. He won one national title in his career, taking the 60 m event at the USA Indoor Track and Field Championships in 1996.

== Career ==
Born in West Palm Beach, Florida, he attended John I. Leonard Community High School in Lake Worth, graduating in 1985. He did not compete in sports at a young age due to a heart murmur, but had begun to take part in the hurdles towards the end of high school. He studied at the University of Kansas and competed collegiately for the Kansas Jayhawks team, including an appearance at the NCAA Championships in 1987. He began to make an impact on the sport after college, hurdling professionally from 1989 onwards. That year he set a best of 13.41 seconds for the 110-meter hurdles and placed third at both the USA Outdoor Track and Field Championships and the U.S. Olympic Festival.

Hawkins was a finalist at the 1990 USA Championships, but finished outside the top three. Reflecting the strength of national competition, he ranked ninth in the world on time that year with his new personal record of 13.28 seconds. He retained that ranking the following year, and improved to fourth at the national championships. Hawkins consistently remained in the top ten of his event from 1990 to 1995. He achieved a new high on the global rankings in the 60-meter hurdles in 1992 with a time of 7.47 seconds, placing him third behind only Colin Jackson and Mark McKoy. He did not qualify for the Olympics that year, dropped out at the quarterfinals of the United States Olympic Trials. He moved up the outdoor rankings in 1993, placing seventh in the Track & Field News lists with a time of 13.25 seconds. Having been a prominent competitor on the circuit he entered the 1994 IAAF Grand Prix Final and placed third.

Hawkins had a career high in the 1995 season. He claimed a 60 m hurdles silver medal on his international debut at the 1995 IAAF World Indoor Championships, forming an American 1–2 with winner Allen Johnson. Hawkins ran a personal record of 7.41 seconds to take the medal. He again ranked third globally in the event (behind Johnson and Jackson) and the time had moved him to fourth in the all-time American rankings, after Greg Foster, Roger Kingdom, and Johnson. As of 2015 he remains in the top-20 all-time for the discipline. An outdoor medal followed at the 1995 Pan American Games in Mar del Plata, Argentina, as he took bronze in a time of 13.54 seconds, finishing behind the higher profile athlete Kingdom and Emilio Valle of Cuba. At the Athletissima meet in Lausanne he set a personal record time of 13.22 seconds. In spite of these successes, he was outside the top three at the national championships both indoors and out, and closed his season injured at the 1995 IAAF Grand Prix Final (ending seventh).

His highest national honour came at the 1996 USA Indoor Track and Field Championships, where he succeeded Allen Johnson to the 60 m hurdles title with a run of 7.46 seconds. This placed him at the top of the yearly rankings for the event that year. This did not translate into success outdoors, however, as he failed to make the final at the Olympic trials and his season's best time of 13.33 left him out of the global top ten for the first time in six years. He moved back inside the top ten in the 1997 and 1998 seasons, including a lifetime best of 13.17 seconds in Ingolstadt in 1998, but a sixth place at the 1997 USA Outdoor Championships was his best performance on the national circuit. He was last at the 1997 IAAF Grand Prix Final. He retired from athletics at the end of the 1999 season.

== Personal records ==
- 110-meter hurdles – 13.17 (1998)
- 50-meter hurdles indoors – 6.46 (1999)
- 60-meter hurdles indoors – 7.41 (1995)

== National titles ==
- USA Indoor Track and Field Championships
  - 60 m hurdles: 1996

== International competitions ==
Year	Competition	Venue	Position	Event	Notes
1994	IAAF Grand Prix Final	Paris, France	3rd	110 m hurdles	13.33
1995	World Indoor Championships	Barcelona, Spain	2nd	60 m hurdles	7.41
1995	Pan American Games	Mar del Plata, Argentina	3rd	110 m hurdles	13.54
1995	IAAF Grand Prix Final	Monaco	7th	110 m hurdles	15.37
1997	IAAF Grand Prix Final	Fukuoka, Japan	8th	110 m hurdles	13.53
