= Jesús Font =

Spanish hurdler

Jesús Font (born 12 June 1972) is a retired Spanish hurdler who specialized in the 110 metres hurdles.

He competed at the 1994 European Indoor Championships and the 1996 Olympic Games without reaching the final. He became Spanish champion in 1996 and 1997. His personal best time was 13.72 seconds, achieved in June 1996 in Aranjuez.
