= Raimundo Santos =

Portuguese long-distance runner

Personal information
- Full name: Raimundo Sousa Santos
- Nationality: Portuguese
- Born: 22 August 1967 (age 59)

Sport
- Sport: Long-distance running
- Event: 5000 metres

Raimundo Sousa Santos (born 22 August 1967) is a Portuguese long-distance runner. He competed in the men's 5000 metres at the 1992 Summer Olympics.
