= Walmes de Souza =

Brazilian hurdler (born 1976)

Personal information
- Nationality: Brazilian
- Born: 14 September 1976 (age 49)

Sport
- Sport: Track and field
- Event: 110 metres hurdles

Walmes de Souza (born 14 September 1976) is a Brazilian hurdler. He competed in the men's 110 metres hurdles at the 1996 Summer Olympics.
