= Clóvis Fernandes =

Brazilian athlete

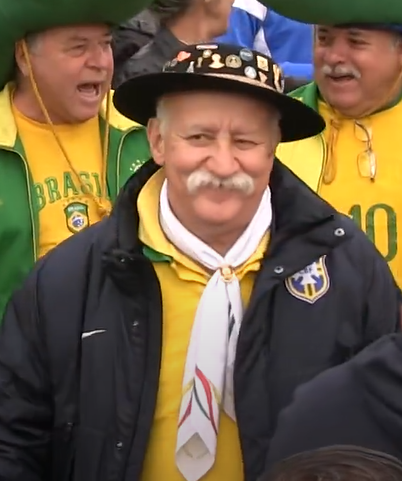
- Fernandes in 2015
- Born: Clovis Acosta Fernandes; 4 October 1954; Cruz Alta, Rio Grande do Sul, Brazil
- Died: 16 September 2015 (aged 60); Porto Alegre, Rio Grande do Sul, Brazil
- Other names: Gaúcho da Copa, Gaúchito
- Occupation: Businessman
- Years active: 1990–2015

Clóvis Acosta Fernandes (4 October 1954 – 16 September 2015) was a Brazilian football fan known as "Gaúcho da Copa".

== Biography ==
Clóvis Fernandes was a businessman from Porto Alegre in southern Brazil who was born in Bagé, Rio Grande do Sul. He had already visited more than 150 national team matches since attending the FIFA World Cup with his Brazil national team in Italy in 1990 and was in more than 30 countries. He jokingly described himself as "12. Player". His trademark was a replica of the FIFA World Cup trophy and he always carried it with him. He also participated in FIFA Confederations Cup.

In the early 1990s, he founded the fan base "Gaúchos na Copa". Already known in South America, he gained great international fame after the semi-finals of the 2014 FIFA World Cup between Brazil and Germany. After the defeat, he was photographed crying with the trophy in his arms. This picture of Brazil's "most sad fan" has been seen by many international media as a symbol of Brazil's historic 7-1 defeat in this semi-final. After the game, he gave his trophy, which he took for years to every game, to a German fan, but received it back for the next game.

A year later, he was in Chile at the Copa América 2015, where he could look forward to the 2–1 win of his team against Peru, but Brazil did not get beyond the quarter-finals. On 16 September 2015 Fernandes died from cancer in Porto Alegre at the age of 60.

For the 2018 FIFA World Cup, his sons carried the trophy in memory of their father.
