= Emerson Perin =

Brazilian hurdler (born 1975)

Personal information
- Nationality: Brazilian
- Born: 17 March 1975 (age 51) Matelândia, Brazil

Sport
- Sport: Track and field
- Event: 110 metres hurdles

Emerson Perín (born 17 March 1975) is a Brazilian hurdler. He competed in the men's 110 metres hurdles at the 1996 Summer Olympics.
