= Claude Edorh =

German hurdler

Claude Edorh (born 27 February 1972) is a retired German hurdler.

He won the bronze medal at the 1991 European Junior Championships and finished fourth at the 1994 European Championships, the latter in a career best time of 13.41 seconds. This places him ninth (joint with Dietmar Koszewski) on the German all-time list, behind Florian Schwarthoff, Mike Fenner, Eric Kaiser, Falk Balzer, Thomas Blaschek, Sven Göhler, Thomas Munkelt and Holger Pohland. Edorh represented the sports club ASV Köln.
