= Miguel de los Santos (athlete) =

Spanish hurdler

Personal information
- Full name: Miguel de los Santos Vílchez
- Nationality: Spanish
- Born: 9 August 1973 (age 53) Estepona, Spain
- Height: 1.87 m (6 ft 2 in)
- Weight: 70 kg (154 lb)

Sport
- Sport: Track and field
- Event: 110 metres hurdles

Miguel de los Santos Vilches (born 9 August 1973) is a Spanish hurdler. He competed in the men's 110 metres hurdles at the 1996 Summer Olympics.
