= 2026 Dhekunu Kandu cave diving incident =

Diving incident in the Maldives

Dhekunu Kandu cave diving incident
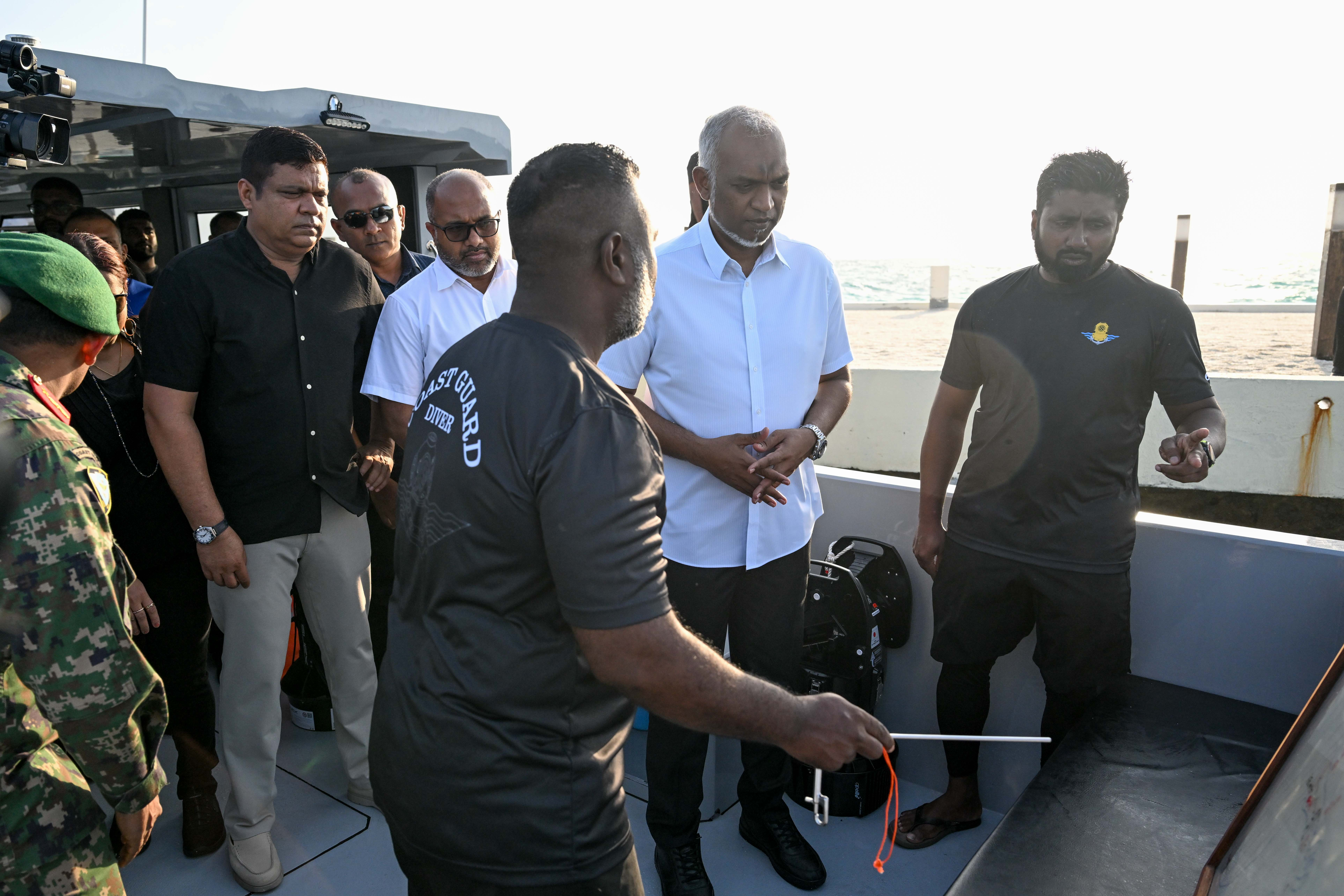
- President Mohamed Muizzu being briefed by MNDF Coast Guard Sergeant Major Mohamed Mahudhee (right) on the search and rescue operations.
- Date: 14 May 2026
- Time: 11:00-13:30
- Location: Dhekunu Kandu Cave, Thinadhoo, Vaavu Atoll, Maldives; 3°35′23.7″N 73°30′20.4″E
- Also known as: Devana Kandu; Thinwana Kandu
- Participants: Gianluca Benedetti; Monica Montefalcone; Giorgia Sommacal; Muriel Oddenino; Federico Gualtieri
- Outcome: Deaths of: Gianluca Benedetti; Monica Montefalcone; Giorgia Sommacal; Muriel Oddenino; Federico Gualtieri; MNDF Coast Guard Sergeant Major Mohamed Mahudhee (during search and rescue operations).
- Deaths: 6
- Inquiries: 2

The 2026 Dhekunu Kandu cave diving incident was a cave diving incident that occurred on May 14th, 2026 at the Dhekunu Kandu cave, also known as the Devana Kandu or Thinwana Kandu cave system, Thinadhoo, Vaavu Atoll, Maldives. The incident involved a team of Italian divers participating in a research and diving expedition aboard the liveaboard vessel MV Duke of York. The dive took place in a deep underwater cave environment at depths which exceeded standard recreational diving limits of 30 meters, and the group failed to surface as scheduled. It was the deadliest diving accident ever recorded in the Maldives. The incident claimed the lives of the five Italian divers and a diver of the Maldives National Defense Force who was part of a search and recovery operation. All victims were recovered; those found deepest in the cave were recovered by an international rescue team organized by the Divers Alert Network.

== Dhekunu Kandu Cave ==
Dhekunu Kandu Cave, also known as Shark Cave locally, is located in Thinadhoo, Vaavu Atoll and is approximately 60 miles from the capital Malé. The cave consists of two chambers. The first chamber acts as the entrance, and it is at a depth of 55 - 58 meters below sea level. A 3-meter-wide tunnel connects the first to the second larger chamber. The latter is completely dark and has a silt floor which, if stirred up, can significantly reduce visibility by causing a silt out. Under normal conditions, no relevant currents have been reported by previous divers.

During the recovery operations, a new dead-end tunnel was discovered in the second chamber, located to the side of the entrance tunnel. This part of the cave had never been mapped before and was absent from all existing maps. The maximum extent of the cave is 60-70 meters.

== Background ==
The research team was composed of Monica Montefalcone, Giorgia Sommacal, Muriel Oddenino, and Federico Gualtieri. Monica Montefalcone, 51, was a marine researcher and associate professor of Ecology at the University of Genoa. She worked for DISTAV, the university's Department of Earth, Environmental, and Life Sciences. She graduated with honours in Biological Sciences from the University of Milan. She conducted long-term studies of the coastal habitat of the Maldives. She also extensively studied the aquatic plant Posidonia oceanica in the Mediterranean Sea. Since 2013, she was the scientific director of major research projects on the coral reefs of the Maldives. Her daughter Giorgia Sommacal often accompanied her during exploration of coastal habitats. Muriel Oddenino was a Marine biologist and ecologist and a research fellow at DISTAV. She had a Bachelor's degree in Natural Sciences from the University of Turin, a Master's degree in Marine Biology and Ecology from the University of Genoa, and was a research assistant for the University of Genoa in the 24th and 25th scientific cruises that were conducted among the central atolls of the Maldives. She was also a Professional Association of Diving Instructors certified divemaster and deep diver, as well as a Technical Diving International certified nitrox diver. Federico Gualtieri was a diving instructor and had a master's degree in Marine Biology and Ecology.

All four were aboard the MV Duke of York, along with a larger group of 20 Italians as part of a scientific research expedition (or "research cruise") which the University of Genoa had undertaken annually since 1997. Diving operations aboard of the MV Duke of York were managed by vessel's captain and diving instructor Gianluca Benedetti. A lawyer for the Italian tour company that sold trips on the yacht, Albatros Top Boat, stated that the operator of the MV Duke of York was unaware that the research team intended to dive further than the recreational limits and that they would not have allowed it if they had known.

As part of the scientific mission, three of the five divers were authorized by the Maldivian authorities to dive to depths of 50 meters, rather than the usual 30-meter limit for recreational diving in the Maldives. A Maldivian government spokesperson stated that Montefalcone's authorization did not specify any cave penetration. Following the accident, the University of Genoa claimed that Montefalcone and Oddenino were there to study the effects of climate change on the biodiversity in the Maldives but that underwater diving was not part of the professor's planned scientific mission, which they stated was carried out on a personal basis, and that diving during scientific missions had been forbidden since March 2024 until new security protocols could be finalized. Lawyers representing the family of Montefalcone expressed surprise that the University would be unaware of any activity taking place during the research expeditions, given their annual occurrence.

== Incident ==
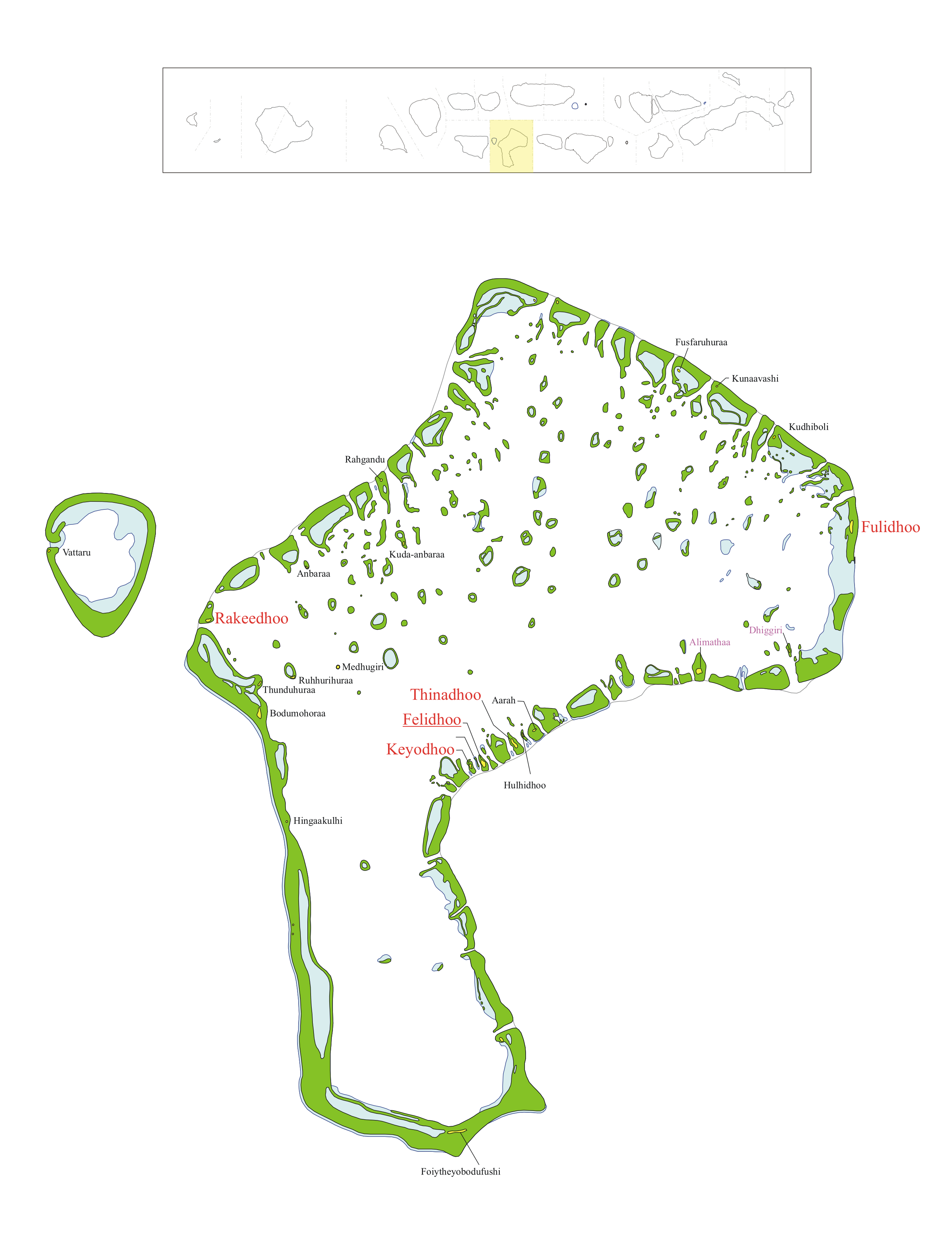
A map of the atoll where Alimathaa Island is located.

The divers dived on May 14th, 2026, approximately at 11:00 am. The dive was expected to last about one hour. When the divers didn't resurface at 12:00 pm they began searching for them with their vessel. At 1:30 pm no one had yet returned. Their dive vessel MV Duke of York notified the Maldivian authorities. The search for the missing began almost immediately but was stymied due to a weather warning in the area. Maldivian authorities identified the Dhekunu Kandu cave as the dive's objective and the presumed location of the missing divers. Search operations on May 16, 2026 consisted of eight local divers working in shifts to locate the missing divers.

== Bodies recovery ==
The Maldivian government initially deployed military divers to attempt the recovery of the bodies. Initial teams were able to identify the cave entrance, mark it, and penetrate the first chamber of the cave. Benedetti's body was the first to be recovered, from a depth of 60 meters, as he was lying in the first chamber of the cave, close to the entrance. His diving tank was empty. This recovery effort however was suspended after one of the military divers, Sergeant Major Mohamed Mahudhee, became ill during ascent and subsequently was pronounced dead at ADK Hospital in Malé.

An international search and recovery mission was established by the Maldivian and Italian authorities, and DAN Europe. A team of Finnish technical divers, some of whom were involved in the recovery of the bodies from the 2014 Pluragrotta disaster including Sami Paakkarinen, Jenni Westerlund and Patrik Grönqvist, were summoned to perform the recovery. Initially the recovery team could not find the missing bodies, and feared they may have been dragged back to open sea by currents and then dispersed in the ocean. Subsequently, the technical divers identified a previously unmapped dead-end tunnel in the second chamber. The four remaining bodies were all found inside this tunnel.

On May 19th the team successfully recovered the bodies of Montefalcone and Gualtieri and their equipment, including action cameras. The recovery team transported the two bodies from the spot where they were found to a depth of approximately 30 meters, where Maldivian divers completed the transfer to the surface. The first body was attached to a transport rope and then twenty minutes later the second body was attached. Nurse sharks were reported to be present during the recovery of the first two bodies. The bodies were then loaded onto Coast Guard vessels. The bodies of Sommacal and Oddenino were recovered on May 20, 2026. The recovery of the last two bodies was hampered temporarily when a tiger shark approached the scene briefly and then left. On May 20, 2026 Mohamed Hussain Shareef, the spokesperson, for the Maldivian authorities confirmed that the bodies would all be repatriated to Italy. The body of Gianluca Benedetti was the first to be returned. On May 23, 2026 the remaining four divers landed at Milan Malpensa Airport and were to be processed at the morgue for autopsies on May 25, 2026 at Sant'Antonio Abate Hospital in Gallarate. The examination of the bodies was being conducted by Luca Tajana from the University of Pavia's Institute of Forensic Medicine. The autopsies were completed on May 26, 2026 and the Montefalcone family lawyer Giuseppe Pugliese stated that no injuries or trauma were identified and that the cause of death would be determined by the toxicology.

== Investigation and findings ==
Lack of correct equipment and training were reported as possible factors in the incident. The investigation is under the jurisdiction of the Maldives, however the Rome Prosecutor's Office is also investigating for manslaughter. Italian prosecutors have asked Maldivian authorities for access to equipment, cameras and documentation. They also asked for access to items currently in custody in Malé including the GoPros, dive computers, and other equipment that were recovered by the recovery team. Electronic equipment from the victims has already been taken by the Genoa Flying Squad as part of the investigation opened by Rome. This includes computers, emails, hard drives, tablets, mobile phones, and USB drives that were owned by the victims. They were brought to Italy by Stefano Venin who was a University of Genoa professor that was on the same expedition.

Grönqvist stated that the divers were only equipped with standard compressed air, two of the divers were only wearing bikinis with a neoprene jacket over them, two divers had thin long wetsuits. He noted that the divers did not utilize a guide line to mark their way out of the cave. He stated that their tanks would have lasted only ten minutes at the depth they were found at which was 60 meters. He stated that in order for them to ascend they would have needed six hours to complete the decompression because of the gas they were using in their tanks.

A preliminary assessment released by DAN Europe in collaboration with Maldivian authorities suggests that it is likely that the divers became disorientated within the cave system and were unable to find their way back out. DAN Europe advised that any further causes and circumstances that caused the incident would be determined by the police and investigative authorities.

Due to the ongoing investigation, the Maldives has suspended the operating licence of the liveaboard vessel Duke of York. The operator of the MV Duke of York Abdul Muhsin Moosa stated that the vessel had permission for recreational dives and that he went over the 30 meter limit with the divers. However, Mohamed Hussain Shareef stated that the reason the vessel was suspended was because they are required to have a dive school permit in order to carry out expeditions. He stated that they did not have this permit.

== Aftermath ==
In the aftermath of the accident, several cave diving experts called for stricter consideration of cave diving precautions. In the Maldives, drafting began on a new law to impose stricter restrictions on technical wreck diving, including dives involving depths greater than the 30 meters recreational limit, or enclosed spaces such as wrecks and caves. Technical wreck diving would require a permit that is limited to researchers and highly certified divers. The legislation aims to introduce minimum standards of experience, safety, equipment, and oversight that would be required before a permit could be granted. Mohamed Hussain Shareef has stated that they are already discussing how to create a legal framework to legalize technical diving in the Maldives. This would allow diving in the Maldives beyond its diving tourism which composes of most of its diving industry.

On May 16, 2026 Sergeant Major Mohamed Mahudhee of the Maldivian Coast Guard was buried with military honors. President Mohamed Muizzu was in attendance of his funeral. Italian President Sergio Mattarella recognized the bravery and professionalism of three Finnish divers who formed part of the recovery operation by awarding them the Order of Merit. President Mohamed Muizzu honored the Maldives Police Service and the Maldives National Defence Force who participated in the operation and presented them certificates of appreciation for their contributions during at a ceremony in Bandaara Koshi.

== See also ==
- Divers Alert Network
- Divers Alert Network Europe
- Diving in the Maldives
- MNDF Coast Guard
- MNDF Marine Corps
