= Deniz Çınar =

Turkish yacht racer

Personal information
- Nationality: Turkish
- Born: 8 December 1984 (age 41) İzmir, Turkey
- Height: 1.73 m (5 ft 8 in) (2012)
- Weight: 69 kg (152 lb) (2024)

Sport
- Country: Turkey
- Sport: Sailing
- Event: 470 class
- Club: Fenerbahçe Doğuş Sailing Club
- Coached by: Edo Fantela

Achievements and titles
- National finals: 11 Times Turkish Champion in 470
Medal record
Men's sailing
Representing Turkey
Laser 4.7 World Championships
Silver medal – second place	2003 Çeşme	Laser 4.7
Balkan Championships
Gold medal – first place	1999 Romania	Optimist
Turkish Championships
Gold medal – first place	2001 Çeşme	Laser 4.7
Gold medal – first place	2007 Istanbul	Laser 4.7

Deniz Çınar (pronounced [ˈdeniːz ˈtʃɯnaɾ]; born 8 December 1984) is a Turkish yacht racer competing in the 470 class. The 1.73 m (5 ft 8 in) tall athlete at 65 kg (143 lb) is a member of Galatasaray Sport Club, where he is coached by Edo Fantela. His brother Ateş is also a national sailor. He studied at Dokuz Eylül University, Environmental Engineering. In 2017, he transferred to Fenerbahçe Sports Club and began competing for Fenerbahçe Doğuş Sailing. After retiring from professional racing, he has been serving as the Fenerbahçe Sailing Branch Manager, passing on his experience to the younger generation.

He began with sailing at the age of ten in Foça, and one year later he started to race.

He became gold medalist in the Optimist class at the 1999 Balkan & Open Sailing Championship in Romania. In 2001 he won the Turkish Sailing Foundation Trophy in the Laser 4.7 class. He gained the silver medal at the Laser 4.7 World Championships held off Çeşme, Turkey. In 2007, he became Turkish champion in the Laser 4.7 class.

Deniz Çınar represented his country in the 470 class event at the 2008 Summer Olympics along with his brother Ateş Çınar. Both qualified again for participation at the 2012 Summer Olympics in London, later competed at the 2016 Summer Olympics in Rio de Janeiro, continued their Olympic campaign at the 2020 Summer Olympics in Tokyo, and most recently represented Turkey at the 2024 Summer Olympics in Paris, where Deniz sailed as the skipper. He and his brother have won the Turkish Championship title in the 470 class more than ten times.

== Achievements ==
Year	Competition	Venue	Position	Event	Notes
Representing Turkey
1999	Balkan & Open Sailing Championship	Romania	1st	Optimist	
2001	Turkish Sailing Foundation Trophy	Çeşme, Turkey	1st	Laser 4.7	
2003	Laser 4.7 World U18 Championships	Çeşme, Turkey	2nd	Laser 4.7	
2003	European Sailing Championships	Italy	12th		
2007	Turkish Sailing Championships	Istanbul, Turkey	1st	Laser 4.7	
2008	Summer Olympics	Beijing, China	28th	470	
2017	ISAF World Championships	Thessaloniki, Greece	5th	470	
2017	European Championships	Monaco, Monaco	7th	470	
2019	European Championships	San Remo, Italy	4th	470	
