= Onán Barreiros =

Spanish sailor

Personal information
- Full name: Onán Barreiros Rodríguez
- Nationality: Spain
- Born: 3 November 1981 (age 44) Las Palmas, Gran Canaria, Spain
- Height: 1.77 m (5 ft 10 in)
- Weight: 66 kg (146 lb)

Sailing career
- Sport: Sailing
- Club: Real Club Náutico de Gran Canaria
- Coached by: Jorge Angulo
- Class: Dinghy

Onán Barreiros Rodríguez (Note: In this Spanish name, the first or paternal surname is Barreiros and the second or maternal family name is Rodríguez.) (born 3 November 1981 in Las Palmas, Gran Canaria) is a Spanish sailor, who specialized in two-person dinghy (420 and 470) class. He represented Spain, along with his partner Aarón Sarmiento, in two editions of the Olympic Games (2008 and 2012), and has also been training for the Royal Nautical Club of Gran Canaria (Spanish: Real Club Náutico de Gran Canaria) throughout most of his sporting career under his personal coach and mentor Jorge Angulo. As of September 2013, Barreiros is ranked no. 14 in the world for two-person dinghy class by the International Sailing Federation.

Barreiros made his official debut at the 2008 Summer Olympics in Beijing, where he paired up with crew member Aarón Sarmiento in the men's 470 class. Solid and confident, the Spanish duo finished outside the medals with a fifth-place effort on 87 points, trailing the feisty French tandem Nicolas Charbonnier and Olivier Bausset by a nine-point margin.

At the 2012 Summer Olympics in London, Barreiros competed for the second time as a skipper in the men's 470 class by finishing ninth and receiving a berth from the ISAF World Championships in Perth, Western Australia. Teaming again with Sarmiento in the opening series, Barreiros narrowly missed a chance to sail for the medal race by a single point behind the Swedes, as the Spanish duo placed eleventh in a fleet of twenty-seven boats with an accumulated net score of 104 points.
