= Alihuras Kandu =

The channel in between Vaavu Atoll and Meemu Atoll from the western set of atolls and Ari Atoll and Nilandhe Atoll. It is also known for the channel between Noonu Atoll, Lhaviyani Atoll and Kaafu Atoll from the western atolls of Maalhosmadulu Atoll (consisting of Raa Atoll and Baa Atoll) and between Fasdhoothere and Thoddoo Atoll and Northern Ari Atoll.
