= Fulidhoo Kandu =

Water channel to two Maldives-located atolls

Fulidhoo Kandu is the channel to the south of South Male' Atoll and to the north of Vaavu Atoll of the Maldives.
