= Ateş Çınar =

Turkish yacht racer

Personal information
- Nationality: Turkish
- Born: 16 May 1986 (age 40) İzmir, Turkey
- Height: 1.73 m (5 ft 8 in) (2012)
- Weight: 72 kg (159 lb) (2012)

Sport
- Country: Turkey
- Sport: Sailing
- Event: 470 class
- Club: Istanbul Yelken Club
- Coached by: Edo Fantela
Medal record
Men's Sailing
Representing Turkey
Laser 4.7 World Championships
Silver medal – second place	2003 Çeşme	Laser 4.7
Turkish Championships
Gold medal – first place	2002 Adana	Laser 4.7
Gold medal – first place	2002 Samsun	Laser 4.7
Gold medal – first place	2003 Çeşme	Laser 4.7

Ateş Çınar (pronounced [ˈateʃ ˈtʃɯnaɾ]; born 16 May 1986) is a Turkish yacht racer competing in the 470 class. The 1.73 m (5 ft 8 in) tall athlete at 72 kg (159 lb) is a member of Galatasaray Sport Club], where he is coached by Edo Fantela. He studied at Dokuz Eylül University. His brother Deniz is also a national sailor.

He became Turkish champion in the Laser 4.7 class at the Turkish Sailing Championships in 2002 and 2003, and won the 2002 Turkish Sailing Foundation Trophy in the same class. He gained the silver medal at the Laser 4.7 World Championships held off Çeşme, Turkey.

Ateş Çınar represented his country in the 470 class event at the 2008 Summer Olympics along with his brother Deniz Çınar. Both qualified again for participation at the 2012 Summer Olympics, where Deniz was the skipper.

== Achievements ==
Year	Competition	Venue	Position	Event	Notes
Representing Turkey
2002	Turkish Sailing Championships	Samsun, Turkey	1st	Laser 4.7	
2002	Turkish Sailing Foundation Trophy	Adana, Turkey	1st	Laser 4.7	
2002	Laser 4.7 World U18 Championships	Muiderzand, Netherlands	9th	Laser 4.7	
2003	Turkish Sailing Championships	Çeşme, Turkey	1st	Laser 4.7	
2003	Laser 4.7 World U18 Championships	Çeşme, Turkey	2nd	Laser 4.7	
2008	Summer Olympics	Beijing, China	28th	470	
