= Mahesh Ramchandran =

Indian sailor

Commander Mahesh Ramchandran (born 2 June 1967) is an Indian sailor and retired Indian Navy officer. A graduate of the National Defence Academy, he holds a Bachelor of Science degree from Jawaharlal Nehru University. He won a bronze medal at the 2002 Asian Games and a silver at the 2006 Asian Games, and was awarded the Arjuna Award on 29 August 2002 for the year 2001, conferred by the then President A. P. J. Abdul Kalam.

Ramchandran has been missing since 20 March 2026, when a speedboat tender to the yacht Ashena capsized off the Maldives. The search for him was suspended on 28 March 2026.

== Career and recognition ==
He started his Naval Career with the Indian Naval Air Arm as a jet pilot.

In 1994, he received a Commendation by the then Chief of Naval Staff for the Sport of Sailing. He began his sailing career in the Hyderabad Sailing Week. In 1996, 1997, 1999, 2001 he was given the Yachtsman of the Year Award by the President, Yachting Association of India. He participated in the 2002 Asian Games and won a bronze medal for India in the Enterprise class of the boat along with the team of Aashim Mongia.

In the Asian Games 2006 in the Match Racing class he won a silver medal for India skippering the event with team of Sanjeev Chauhan, Girdhari Yadav and Nitin Mongia. In the World Military Games in 2007, he won a Gold in Match Racing. In the World Sailing Championships in 1999 held in South Africa, he won a silver medal for the country. In the Asian Sailing Championships in 2001, 2006, 2010 and 2012 he won Gold, Silver and bronze medals for India.

In 2009, he was selected by the Navy to conduct Sailing Trials of INSV Mhadei which has successfully completed two solo circumnavigation by Indians. In 2010, he was the first Officer-in-Charge of the Watermanship Training Centre at the Indian Naval Academy Ezhimala. At the academy, he instituted the Admirals Cup Regatta, an Inter-Navy Sailing Championship. He has also been the National Coach for the Olympic Laser Class Association of India, Matchracing Class and Enterprise Class.

== Boat capsized in Maldives ==
On 20 March 2026, Ramchandran was the captain of a speedboat tender to the yacht Ashena when it capsized near Felidhoo in Vaavu Atoll, the Maldives, with seven people aboard. The yacht's owner, Gautam Singhania, survived with minor injuries. The rally driver Hari Singh died, and Ramchandran was reported missing. The search for him was suspended on 28 March 2026.

Abhilash Tomy, a retired Navy commander, said of Ramchandran: "He (Mahesh) was a great competitor and sailor. He was at his peak when I started sailing, so I was able to get a glimpse of him at his best."
