= Keyodhoo =

Keyodhoo may refer to the following places in the Maldives:

- Keyodhoo (Baa Atoll)
- Keyodhoo (Vaavu Atoll)
