= 2ofus =

Maldivian boy band

- Origin: Maldives
- Genres: Pop
- Members: Ahmed Adhuham; Abdulla Shamrooh
- Past members: Mohamed Nasooh bin Nasruddin; Ahmed Shaheed (Shahyd Legacy); Ahmed Jasheen

2ofus is a Maldivian musical band that gained prominence in the Maldivian music scene, notably through their participation in Battle of the Bands International and winning third place.

The band consists of five members. The band is led by Ahmed Adhuham and consists of Abdulla Shamrooh, Mohamed Nasrooh bin Nasruddin, Ahmed Shaheed (Shahyd Legacy), and Ahmed Jasheem.

In May 2025, they had a full show in Olympus Stadium in Malé, as well as a live viewereship of more than 30,000 people watching. They also performed at Fulidhoo and Velidhoo.

In June 2025, they were invited to audition for Britain's Got Talent Series 19, as well as named Visit Maldives' first local ambassador.

Anu Malik praised the band and said that their performance on Battle of the Bands International was one of the best performances he's seen. They were also praised by Abhijeet Bhattacharya and said that they captured the hearts of the audience as well as the judges with their rendititon of Badan Pe Sitare Lapete Huye. Vice President of the Maldives Hussain Mohamed Latheef congratulated the band for achiever second runner up and said that it'll inspire other Maldivian artists.

In October 2025, the band's lead vocalist Mohamed Nasooh left the band without stating a reason. 2ofus states that the decision was mutual and was reached following discussions from the band. In January 2026, the band's guitarist Ahmed Shaheed (Shahyd Legacy) left the band over allegations of lack of financial transparency, professional respect, and creative alignment. Shaheed claimed that a "lack of financial transparency and consistent payment practices created an unsustainable environment" and that it felt like a one-man band rather than a collaborative effort.
