= Sailing at the 2008 Summer Olympics – Men's 470 =

Men's 470 at the Games of the XXIX Olympiad
- Line drawing of the 470
- Venue: Qingdao International Sailing Centre
- Dates: First race: 11 August 2008; Last race: 18 August 2008
- Competitors: 58 from 29 nations
- Teams: 29 (boats)

Medalists
| 1st place, gold medalist(s) | | Nathan Wilmot; Malcolm Page | Australia |
| 2nd place, silver medalist(s) | | Nick Rogers; Joe Glanfield | Great Britain |
| 3rd place, bronze medalist(s) | | Nicolas Charbonnier; Olivier Bausset | France |

The Men's 470 was a sailing event on the Sailing at the 2008 Summer Olympics program in Qingdao International Sailing Centre, in the 470 dinghy. Eleven races (last one a medal race) were scheduled and completed. 58 sailors, on 29 boats, from 29 nations competed. Ten boats qualified for the medal race.

== Race schedule ==
| ● | Practice race | ● | Race on Yellow | ● | Race on Orange | ● | Medal race on Yellow |

| Date | August | | | | | | | | | | | | | | | | | |
| Date | 7 Thu | 8 Fri | 9 Sat | 10 Sun | 11 Mon | 12 Tue | 13 Wed | 14 Thu | 15 Fri | 16 Sat | 17 Sun | 18 Mon | 19 Tue | 20 Wed | 21 Thu | 22 Fri | 23 Sat | 24 Sun |
|---|---|---|---|---|---|---|---|---|---|---|---|---|---|---|---|---|---|---|
Scheduled
| Actual | | | | PR | S1,2 | S3,4 | S,5,6 | Res | S7,8 | S8,10 | Res | MR | | | | | | |

== Course areas and course configurations ==
For the 470 course areas A (Yellow) and D (Orange) were used. The location (36°1'26"’N, 120°26'52"E) points to the center of the 0.6nm radius Yellow course area and the location (36°1'10"N, 120°28'47"E) points to the center of the 0.75nm radius Orange course area. The target time for the course was about 60 minutes for the races and 30 minutes for the medal race. The race management could choose from several course configurations.

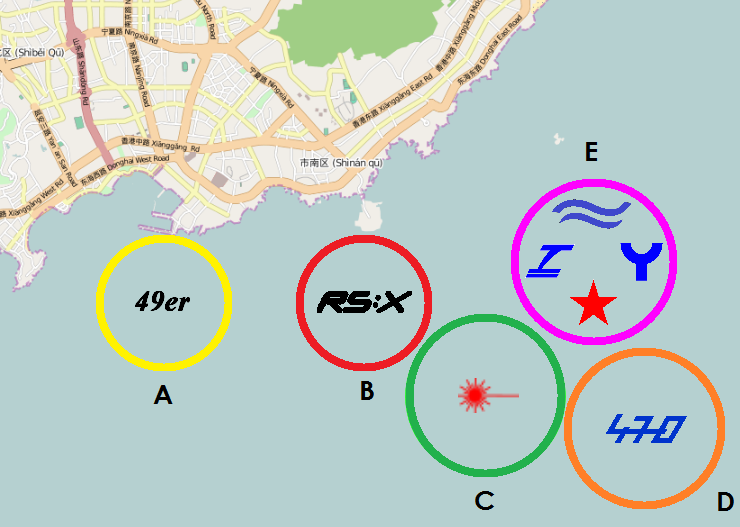
Course Areas

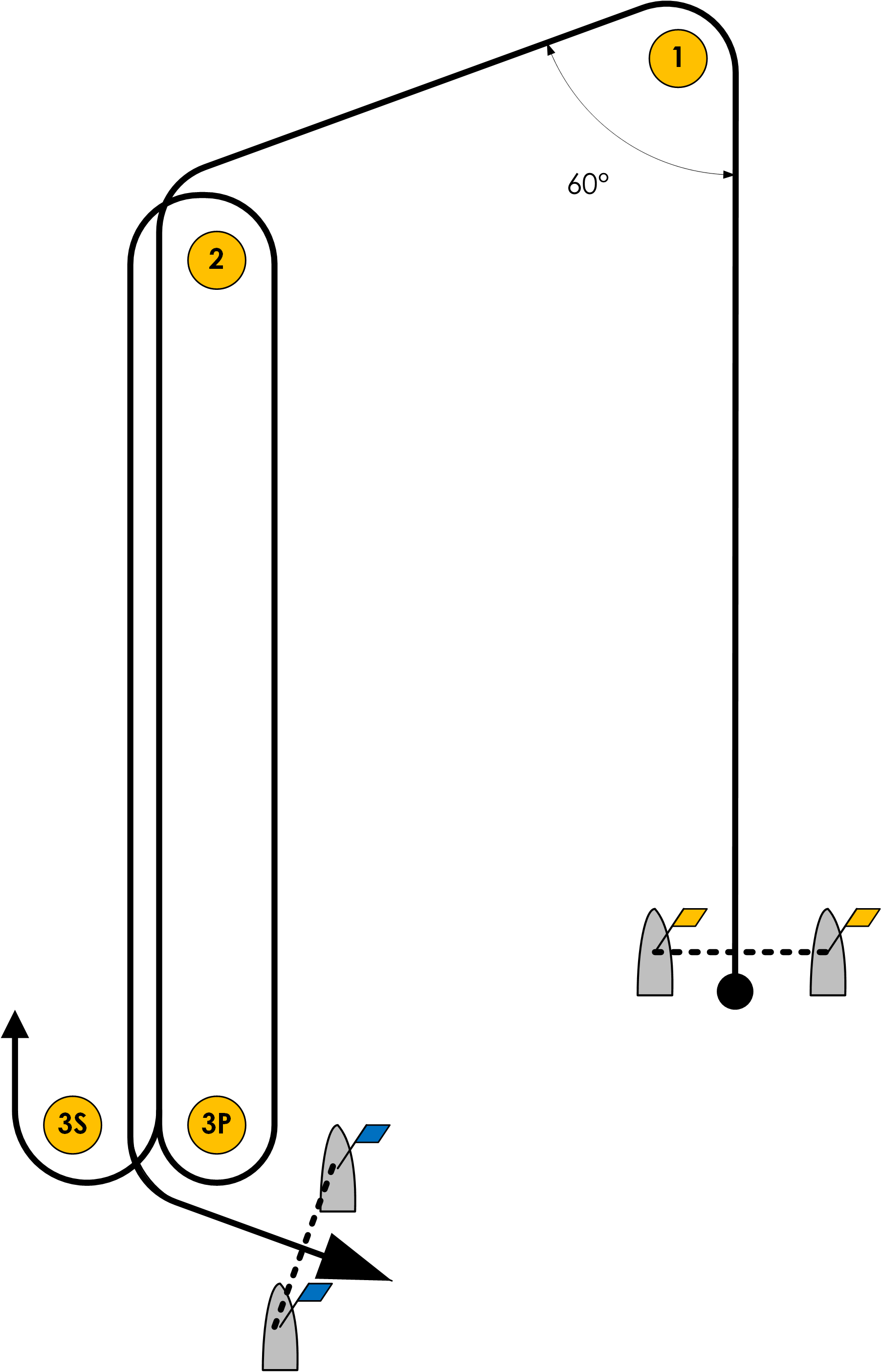
60° Trapezoid Outer Course (O)

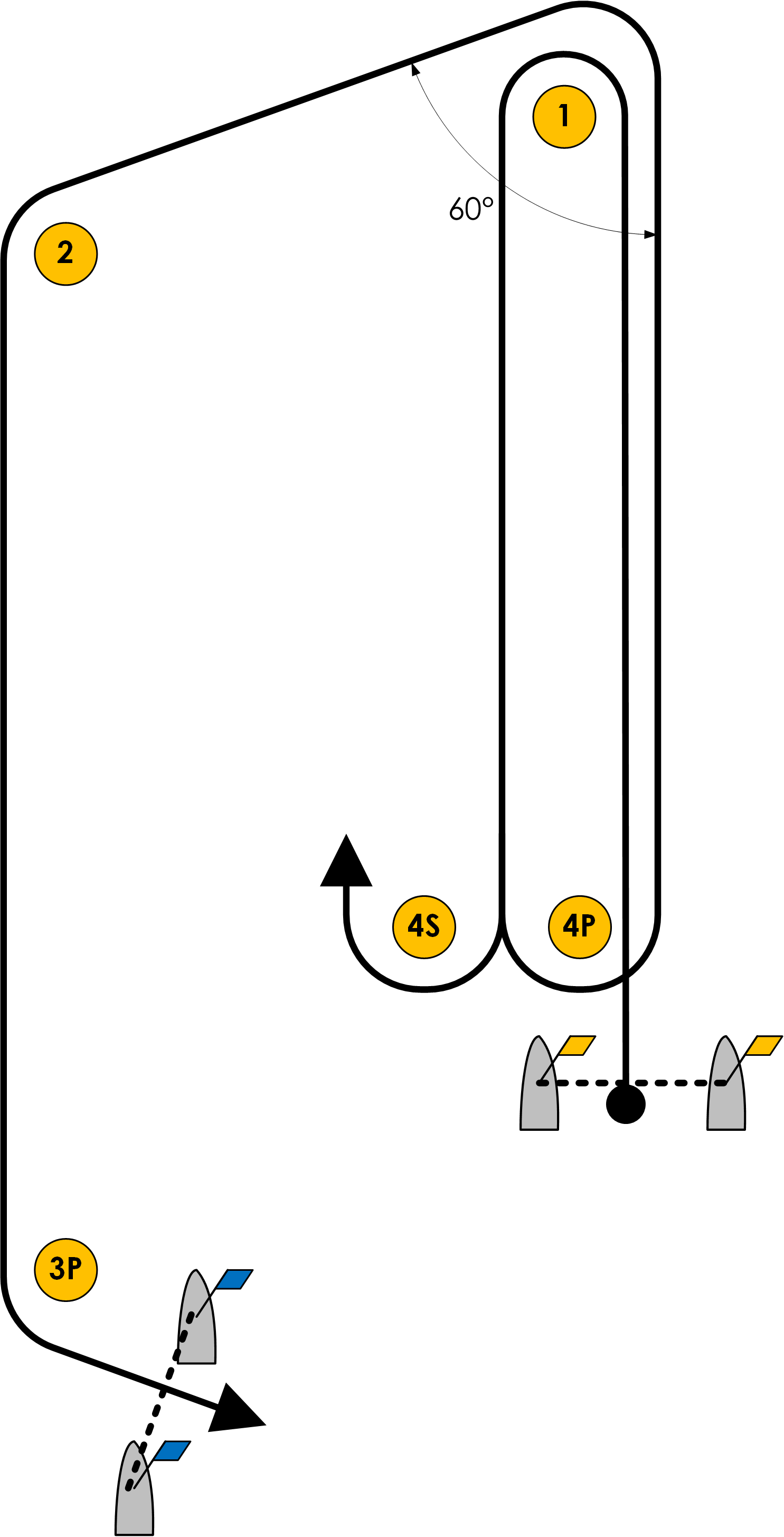
60° Trapezoid Inner Course (I)

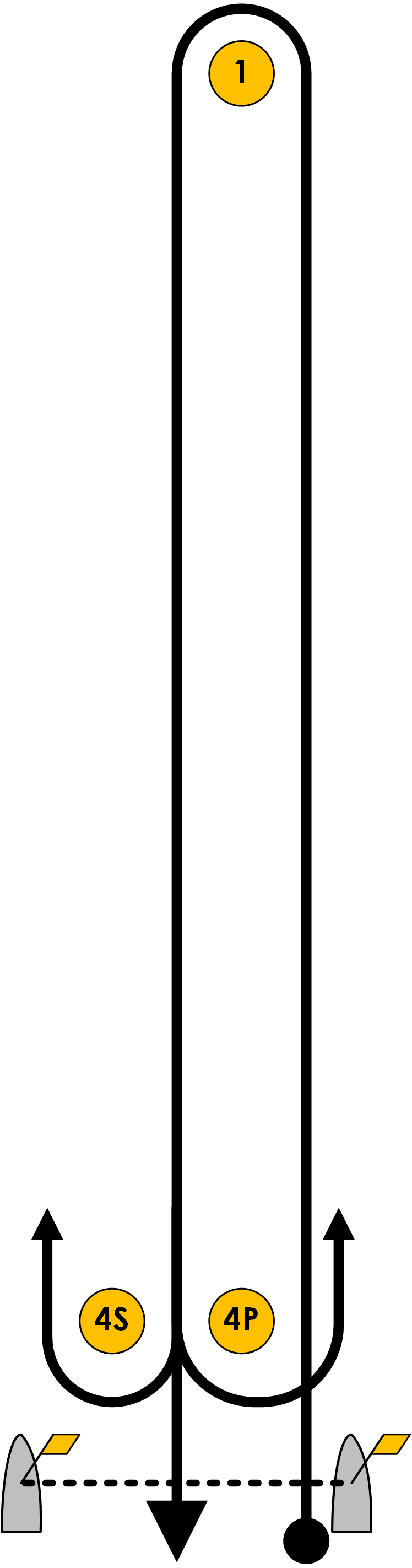
Windward – Leeward Course (W)

=== Outer courses ===
- O1: START – 1 – 2 – 3s/3p – 2 – 3p – FINISH
- O2: START – 1 – 2 – 3s/3p – 2 – 3s/3p – 2 – 3p – FINISH
- O3: START – 1 – 2 – 3s/3p – 2 – 3s/3p – 2 – 3s/3p – 2 – 3p – FINISH

=== Inner courses ===
- I1: START – 1 – 4s/4p – 1 – 2 – 3p – FINISH
- I2: START – 1 – 4s/4p – 1 – 4s/4p – 1 – 2 – 3p – FINISH
- I3: START – 1 – 4s/4p – 1 – 4s/4p – 1 – 4s/4p – 1 – 2 – 3p – FINISH

=== Windward-Leeward courses ===
- W2: START – 1 – 4s/4p – 1 – FINISH
- W3: START – 1 – 4s/4p – 1 – 4s/4p – 1 – FINISH
- W4: START – 1 – 4s/4p – 1 – 4s/4p – 1 – 4s/4p – 1 – FINISH

== Weather conditions ==
In the lead up to the Olympics many questioned the choice of Qingdao as a venue with very little predicted wind. During the races the wind was pretty light and quite unpredictable but the Men's 470 competition was executed as scheduled.

== Final results ==
Results of individual races
| Pos | Helmsman | Country | I | II | III | IV | V | VI | VII | VIII | IX | X | MR | Tot | Pts |
|---|---|---|---|---|---|---|---|---|---|---|---|---|---|---|---|
| Gold medal | Nathan Wilmot; Malcolm Page | Australia | 4 | 7 | 3 | 3 | 3 | 4 | 5 | 16^{†} | 3 | 10 | 1 | 60.0 | 44.0 |
| Silver medal | Nick Rogers; Joe Glanfield | Great Britain | 19 | 5 | 1 | 4 | 9 | 6 | 20 | OCS 30^{†} | 2 | 3 | 3 | 105.0 | 75.0 |
| Bronze medal | Nicolas Charbonnier; Olivier Bausset | France | 6 | 3 | 8 | 1 | 6 | 18 | 3 | 14 | 7 | 20^{†} | 6 | 98.0 | 78.0 |
| 4 | Sven Coster; Kalle Coster | Netherlands | 11 | 15^{†} | 12 | 2 | 8 | 15 | 2 | 8 | 4 | 2 | 7 | 93.0 | 78.0 |
| 5 | Onán Barreiros; Aarón Sarmiento | Spain | 8 | 2 | 6 | 9 | 13 | 13 | 13 | 4 | 11 | 18^{†} | 4 | 105.0 | 87.0 |
| 6 | Gabrio Zandonà; Andrea Trani | Italy | 10 | 4 | 7 | 7 | 2 | 21 | 19 | 6 | 29^{†} | 5 | 5 | 120.0 | 91.0 |
| 7 | Tetsuya Matsunaga; Taro Ueno | Japan | 1 | 20 | 24^{†} | 13 | 10 | 14 | 1 | 9 | 21 | 4 | 2 | 121.0 | 97.0 |
| 8 | Álvaro Marinho; Miguel Nunes | Portugal | 2 | 8 | 15 | 6 | 11 | 7 | 9 | OCS 30^{†} | 10 | 14 | 10 | 132.0 | 102.0 |
| 9 | Šime Fantela; Igor Marenić | Croatia | 18 | 6 | 9 | OCS 30^{†} | 12 | 17 | 6 | 7 | 15 | 1 | 8 | 137.0 | 107.0 |
| 10 | Javier Conte; Juan de la Fuente | Argentina | 14 | 14 | 4 | 11 | 19 | 9 | 7 | OCS 30^{†} | 5 | 9 | 9 | 140.0 | 110.0 |
| 11 | Carl Evans; Peter Burling | New Zealand | 7 | 10 | 14 | 12 | BFD 30^{†} | 10 | 22 | 12 | 1 | 7 | | 125.0 | 95.0 |
| 12 | Andreas Kosmatopoulos; Andreas Papadopoulos | Greece | 5 | 26 | 11 | 8 | 5 | 5 | 18 | 3 | 20 | 29^{†} | | 130.0 | 101.0 |
| 13 | Stuart McNay; Graham Biehl | United States | 26 | 12 | 30^{†} | 17 | 15 | 1 | 4 | 1 | 6 | 23 | | 135.0 | 105.0 |
| 14 | Gideon Kliger; Udi Gal | Israel | 13 | 16 | 13 | 14 | BFD 30^{†} | 11 | 15 | 2 | 12 | 12 | | 138.0 | 108.0 |
| 15 | Anton Dahlberg; Sebastian Östling | Sweden | 16 | 18 | 2 | 5 | BFD 30^{†} | 20 | 17 | 13 | 14 | 6 | | 141.0 | 111.0 |
| 16 | Gerald Owens; Philip Lawton | Ireland | 22 | 1 | 17 | 15 | 1 | 25^{†} | 21 | 15 | 13 | 24 | | 154.0 | 129.0 |
| 17 | Fábio Pillar; Samuel Albrecht | Brazil | 9 | 30^{†} | 10 | 18 | 4 | OCS 30 | 16 | 10 | 24 | 13 | | 164.0 | 134.0 |
| 18 | Karlo Hmeljak; Mitja Nevečny | Slovenia | 3 | 11 | 19 | 10 | 19 | OCS 30^{†} | 25 | 20 | 25 | 8 | | 169.0 | 139.0 |
| 19 | Patryk Piasecki; Kacper Ziemiński | Poland | 20 | 9 | 20 | 23 | 17 | 16 | 8 | 24^{†} | 23 | 15 | | 175.0 | 151.0 |
| 20 | Mikhail Sheremetyev; Maksim Sheremetyev | Russia | 27^{†} | 21 | 22 | 21 | 24 | 12 | 11 | 11 | 18 | 17 | | 184.0 | 157.0 |
| 21 | Sergei Desukevich; Pavel Logunov | Belarus | 29^{†} | 27 | 16 | 26 | 16 | 2 | 12 | 17 | 16 | 27 | | 188.0 | 159.0 |
| 22 | Xu Yuan Zhen; Terence Koh | Singapore | 15 | 17 | 18 | 19 | BFD 30^{†} | 8 | 10 | 19 | 27 | 26 | | 189.0 | 159.0 |
| 23 | Tobias Etter; Felix Steiger | Switzerland | 21 | 23 | 5 | 25 | 7 | OCS 30^{†} | 27 | 26 | 9 | 19 | | 192.0 | 162.0 |
| 24 | Matthias Schmid; Florian Reichstädter | Austria | 24 | 19 | 25^{†} | 24 | 14 | 24 | 24 | 5 | 19 | 11 | | 189.0 | 164.0 |
| 25 | Yoon Cheul; Kim Hyeong-tae | South Korea | 17 | 24 | 21 | 27^{†} | 20 | 3 | 23 | 25 | 22 | 25 | | 207.0 | 180.0 |
| 26 | Wang Weidong; Deng Daokun | China | 12 | 30^{†} | 23 | 16 | 21 | 26 | OCS 30^{†} | 22 | 8 | 28 | | 216.0 | 186.0 |
| 27 | Niklas Lindgren; Heikki Elomaa | Finland | 28 | 22 | 27 | DSQ 30^{†} | 25 | 19 | 14 | 23 | 17 | 21 | | 226.0 | 196.0 |
| 28 | Deniz Çınar; Ateş Çınar | Turkey | 23 | 13 | 26 | 22 | 22 | 23 | 26 | 21 | 28^{†} | 22 | | 226.0 | 198.0 |
| 29 | Stéphane Locas; Oliver Bone | Canada | 25 | 25 | DNF 30^{†} | 20 | 23 | 22 | OCS 30 | 18 | 26 | 16 | | 235.0 | 205.0 |

Scoring system: low-point system;
Legend: – Qualified for medal race(s); BFD – Black flag disqualification; DNE – Non excludable disqualification; DNF – Did not finish; DPI – Discretionary penalty imposed; OCS – On the course side of the starting line; † – Discarded race not counted in the overall result;

== Daily standings ==
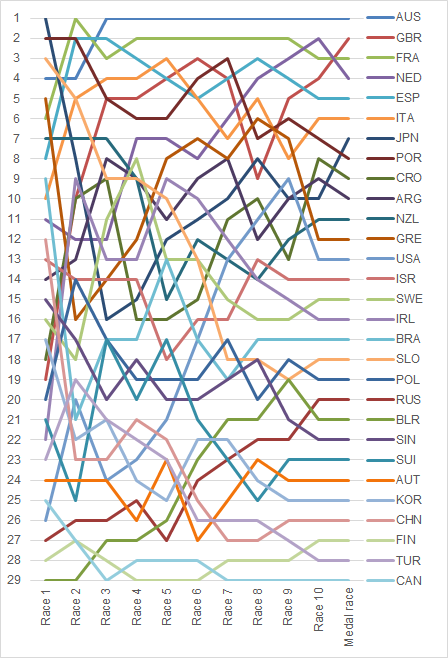
Graph showing the daily standings in the Men's 470 during the 2008 Summer Olympics

=== Medalists ===
Australian Gold Medalists
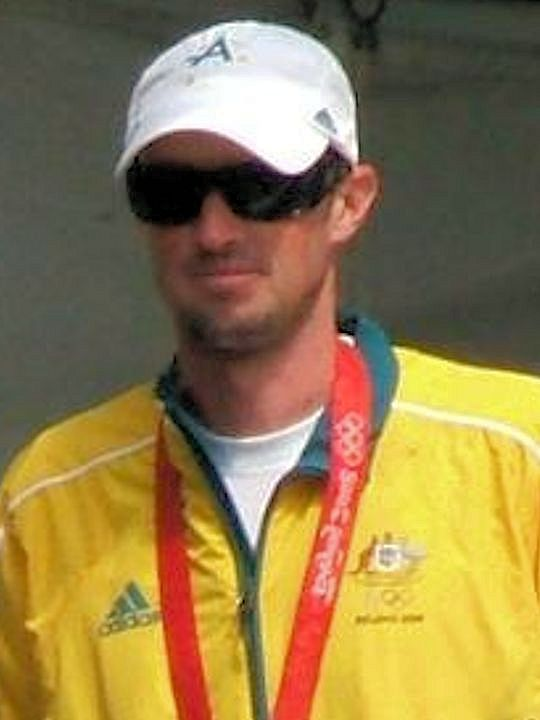
Helmsman: Nathan Wilmot

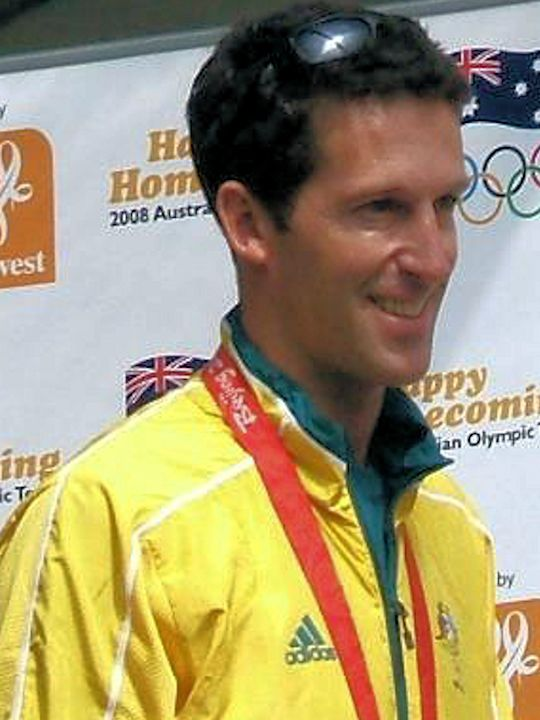
Crew: Malcolm Page
