= Sailing at the 2006 Asian Games – Match racing =

Open match racing at the 2006 Asian Games
- Venue: Doha Sailing Club
- Date: 6–13 December 2006
- Competitors: 36 from 8 nations

Medalists
gold medal	Singapore; Ivan Tan, Justin Wong, Renfred Tay, Teo Wee Chin, Roy Tay
silver medal	India; Sanjeev Chauhan, Girdhari Yadav, Nitin Mongia, Mahesh Ramchandran
bronze medal	South Korea; Yoon Cheul, Kim Tae-jung, Kim Hyeong-tae, Kim Sang-suk

The open Beneteau First Class 7.5 competition at the 2006 Asian Games in Doha was held from 6 to 13 December 2006. The competition was Match race format. It consisted of a round-robin a semi-finals and final series. The top four crews from the round-robin were seeded into the semifinal.

== Schedule ==
All times are Arabia Standard Time (UTC+03:00)

Date	Time	Event
Wednesday, 6 December 2006	11:00	Preliminary round
Thursday, 7 December 2006	11:00	Preliminary round
Friday, 8 December 2006	11:00	Preliminary round
Sunday, 10 December 2006	11:00	Preliminary round
Monday, 11 December 2006	11:00	Preliminary round
Tuesday, 12 December 2006	11:00	Semifinals
Wednesday, 13 December 2006	11:00	Finals

== Squads ==
Bahrain	India	Kuwait	Pakistan
Abdulaziz Al-Mahmeed; Mustafa Jahani; Ebrahim Abdulla Sadeq; Abdulrahim Abdulla Sadeq; Sameer Showaiter	Sanjeev Chauhan; Girdhari Yadav; Nitin Mongia; Mahesh Ramchandran	Salem Al-Fahad; Nayef Al-Hadah; Mohammad Al-Hamdan; Abdulaziz Al-Kandari; Khalid Al-Qabandi	Zahid Rauf; Mamoon Sadiq; Amir Nawaz; Abdul Hameed
Qatar	Singapore	South Korea	Thailand
Amro Ahmed; Khalid Al-Hammadi; Ali Al-Safran; Saleh Al-Briki; Ebrahim Bu Shawarib	Ivan Tan; Justin Wong; Renfred Tay; Teo Wee Chin; Roy Tay	Yoon Cheul; Kim Tae-jung; Kim Hyeong-tae; Kim Sang-suk	Wiwat Poonpat; Chaiwat Thaiking; Anun Daochanterk; Kittisak Phuyim

== Results ==
=== Preliminary round ===
Pos	Team	Pld	W	L	Pts	SIN	IND	THA	KOR	BRN	PAK	QAT	KUW
1	Singapore	14	11	3	11	—	W W	L L	W L	W W	W W	W W	W W
2	India	14	11	3	11	L L	—	W W	L W	W W	W W	W W	W W
3	Thailand	14	10	4	10	W W	L L	—	W W	W W	L L	W W	W W
4	South Korea	14	9	5	9	L W	W L	L L	—	W L	W W	W W	W W
5	Bahrain	14	7	7	7	L L	L L	L L	L W	—	W W	W W	W W
6	Pakistan	14	6	8	6	L L	L L	W W	L L	L L	—	W W	W W
7	Qatar	14	2	12	2	L L	L L	L L	L L	L L	L L	—	W W
8	Kuwait	14	0	14	0	L L	L L	L L	L L	L L	L L	L L	—

Source: Official website

=== Knockout round ===
Semifinals
1	Singapore	W	W	W
4	South Korea	L	L	L
2	India	W	W	L	W
3	Thailand	L	L	W	L

Final
1	Singapore	W	L	W	W
2	India	L	W	L	L
Bronze medal sailoff
4	South Korea	W	W
3	Thailand	L	L
