= 2025 ILCA 4 World Championships =

23rd ILCA 4 World Championship

2025 ILCA 4 World Championship
Event title
- Name: 2025 ILCA 4 World Championship
- Edition: 23rd
- Host: Cabrillo Beach Yacht Club, Los Angeles

Event details
- Venue: Cabrillo Beach Yacht Club
- Dates: 19 to 26 July 2026

Competitors
- Competitors: 240

Results
- (gold) Gold: (Greece) Konstantinos Portosalte (Spain) Blanca Ferrando Babe
- (silver) Silver: (Brazil) Erik Scheidt (Peru) Isabella Suazo
- (bronze) Bronze: (Turkey) Sadrihan Suer (Turkey) Derin Bartan

The 2025 ILCA 4 Youth World Championships was a sailing world championship that took place at the Cabrillo Beach Yacht Club, Los Angeles from 19 to 26 July 2026.

The boys' event was won by Konstantinos Portosalte of Greece, and the girls' by Spanish sailor Blanca Ferrando Babe.

== Results ==
Top 25 of both fleets listed only

=== Boys ===
Rank	Athlete	Category	Qualifier race						Gold fleet race						Total points	Net Points
Rank	Athlete	Category	Q1	Q2	Q3	Q4	Q5	Q6	F1	F2	F3	F4	F5	F6	Total points	Net Points
1st place, gold medalist(s)	Konstantinos Portosalte (GRE)		2	10	1	1	1	2	~~DSQ~~	2	4	4	9	10	117	46
2nd place, silver medalist(s)	Erik Scheidt (BRA)		7	2	6	19	4	3	9	5	16	~~32~~	3	3	109	77
3rd place, bronze medalist(s)	Sadrihan Suer (TUR)		4	17	~~23~~	12	5	1	4	11	13	6	8	2	106	83
4	Emmanouil Anastasios Vomvylas (GRE)		1	3	10	1	1	7	5	13	33	1	10	~~57~~	142	85
5	Nathan Wehrle (FRA)	U16	7	9	1	20	2	5	6	8	19	5	~~27~~	4	113	86
6	Nikko Palou (ESP)	U16	18	24	2	5	13	1	3	9	1	7	~~32~~	6	121	89
7	Stefanos Samaras (GRE)	U16	12	1	6	4	3	6	15	4	28	9	4	~~62~~	154	92
8	Charalampos Velianitis (HKG)		11	2	4	9	2	~~UFD~~	16	6	17	8	28	5	179	108
9	Edi Jurman (CRO)		10	29	13	4	11	3	13	1	23	2	~~36~~	23	168	132
10	Ian Goh (SGP)		5	6	14	3	9	12	30	27	3	~~31~~	17	24	181	150
11	Davide Bazzoni (USA)		1	5	9	3	12	(71 UFD)	43	42	14	11	14	16	241	170
12	Tayfun Türk (TUR)		17	30	29	6	4	8	18	12	12	29	(55)	8	228	173
13	Toby Waggett (GBR)	U16	12	26	26	5	3	11	14	3	41	3	(49)	33	226	177
14	Alexandros Apiranthitis (GRE)		38	14	12	7	10	11	22	(56)	35	24	6	11	246	190
15	Sinan Uslu (TUR)	U16	13	6	35	27	8	8	2	31	26	10	(45)	26	237	192
16	Eleftherios Tsoukatos (GRE)		21	11	11	11	6	2	10	14	(58)	38	30	38	250	192
17	Iason Panagopoulos (GRE)		14	41	10	2	18	17	28	26	32	(47)	2	7	244	197
18	Giorgos Bougiouris (GRE)		3	8	25	16	5	4	8	52	(60)	41	24	25	271	211
19	Tiago Cheng De Villemor Salgado (HKG)	U16	14	36	38	15	15	12	11	15	(50)	22	19	15	262	212
20	Leo Gosling (SUI)	U16	28	20	20	24	17	13	1	10	27	15	38	(53)	266	213
21	Alessandro Maria Massironi (ITA)		24	3	18	14	13	9	31	46	20	(71 DSQ)	16	30	295	224
22	Felipe Fridrich (BRA)		37	16	7	28	19	13	44	(45)	36	13	11	13	282	237
23	Timothy Liu (USA)	U16	19	16	2	9	18	31	(48)	40	45	20	12	31	291	243
24	Salvador Marchena Ortega (PER)		36	46	13	10	21	5	12	17	(54)	42	22	20	298	244
25	Fabian Collazo (PUR)		68	15	21	23	7	9	19	28	(70)	19	18	21	318	248

=== Girls ===
Rank	Athlete	Qualifier race						Gold fleet race						Total points	Net Points
Rank	Athlete	Q1	Q2	Q3	Q4	Q5	Q6	F1	F2	F3	F4	F5	F6	Total points	Net Points
1st place, gold medalist(s)	Blanca Ferrando Babe (ESP)	6	2	1	1	11	7	3	6	7	7	5	~~DNF~~	107	56
2nd place, silver medalist(s)	Isabella Suazo (PER)	3	19	2	8	5	1	16	1	~~20~~	2	8	1	86	66
3rd place, bronze medalist(s)	Derin Bartan (TUR)	~~20~~	3	4	6	5	3	16	7	14	5	16	2	99	79
4	Derin Degisen (TUR)	2	6	1	45	4	14	4	4	31	4	17	5	138	93
5	Eleni Alchanati (GRE)	1	10	7	3	2	12	~~28~~	26	3	10	9	11	122	94
6	Beata Dokoupilova (POR)	~~42~~	8	6	5	11	2	8	3	30	3	2	18	138	96
7	Adele Ramm-Ericson (SWE)	14	7	4	2	3	20	1	8	22	9	~~31~~	10	131	100
8	Giulia Marella (ITA)	10	4	~~16~~	15	10	4	5	13	12	12	1	14	116	100
9	Fragkiski Kosma (GRE)	3	~~UFD~~	8	10	1	11	7	14	1	13	32	17	168	117
10	Nika Fornažar (CRO)	24	3	6	5	9	3	29	5	28	14	~~44~~	4	174	130
11	Eliza Denning (BAH)	37	14	20	12	12	2	10	2	(41)	1	21	6	178	137
12	Capucine Deltel (FRA)	21	5	32	4	1	4	20	10	(51 UFD)	11	11	21	191	140
13	Nefeli Podiadi (GRE)	8	2	18	1	17.3 SCP	9	2	23	10	15	39	(48)	192.3	144.3
14	Llucia Salas Pascual (ESP)	11	7	3	2	20	22	15	(40)	5	30	14	24	193	153
15	Talia Hamlin (JPN)	22	23	15	11	14	6	22	9	(36)	6	13	16	193	157
16	Iiris Sepponen (FIN)	11	1	10	7	3	8	23	(30)	29	23	29	15	189	159
17	Martina Corno (ITA)	10	4	2	8	6	11	11	27	21	28	33	(40)	201	161
18	Gabriela Mascarenhas (USA)	26	11	16	3	13	1	9	(29)	26	16	18	23	191	162
19	Maia Lim Laurie (USA)	4	13	30	14	12	13	12	21	4	19	(37)	20	199	162
20	Sofía Hernández Hernández (ESP)	18	25	9	7	17	16	13	12	13	24	19	(28)	201	173
21	Prin Subying (THA)	21	1	3	13	8	21	(37)	35	11	20	22	26	218	181
22	Monica Osha Perez (ESP)	5	6	12	11	27	6	25	(47)	35	8	42	8	232	185
23	Zala Sterni (ITA)	30	27	8	10	25	17	(32)	25	19	17	3	9	222	190
24	Jessica Powell (GBR)	(36)	20	21	4	21	10	30	16	16	18	27	13	232	196
25	Leanne Turrin (SUI)	29	11	11	16	4	14	17	34	31	29	4	(43)	243	200
