= Diving in the Philippines =

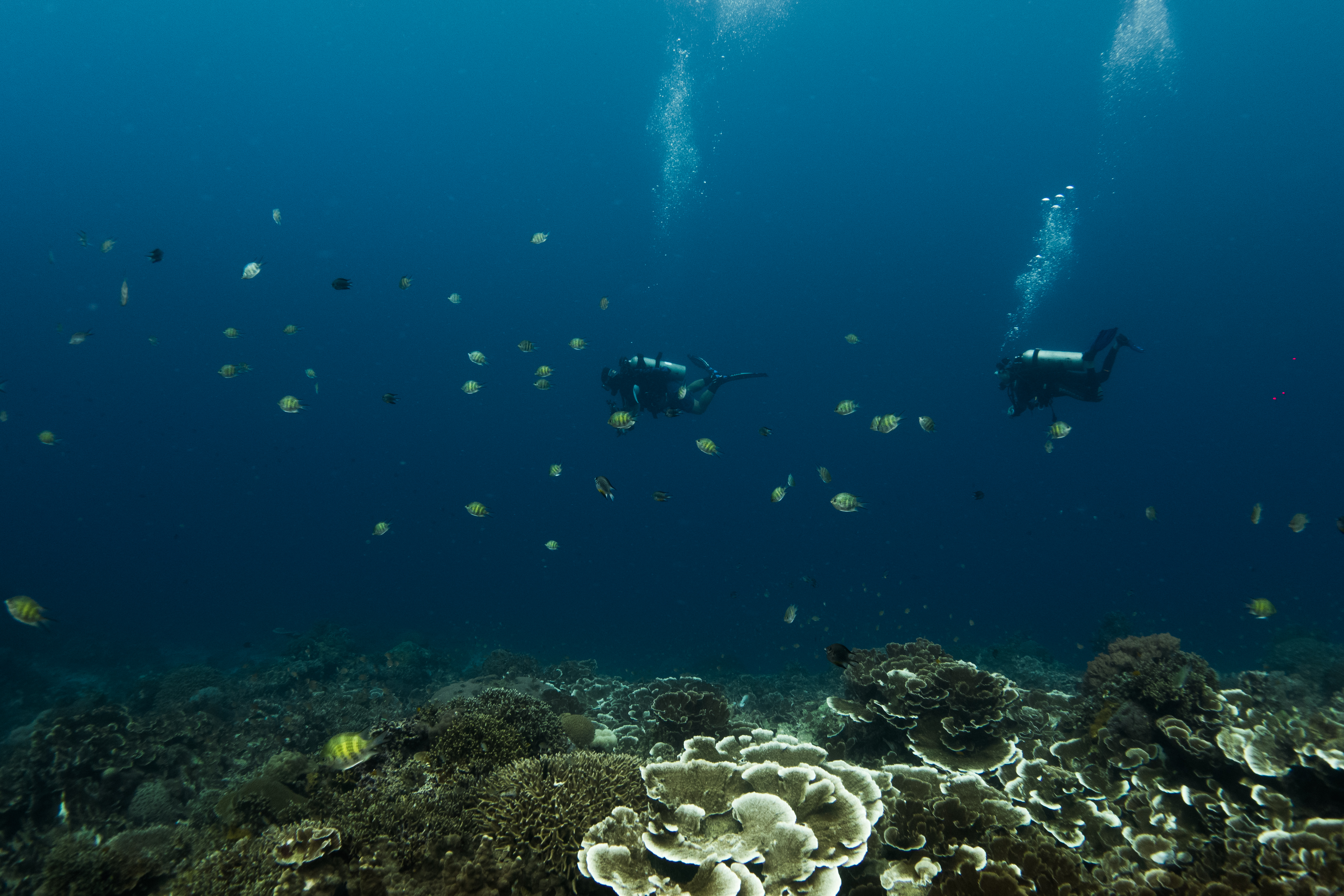
Scuba divers in Apo Island Sanctuary in Negros Island.

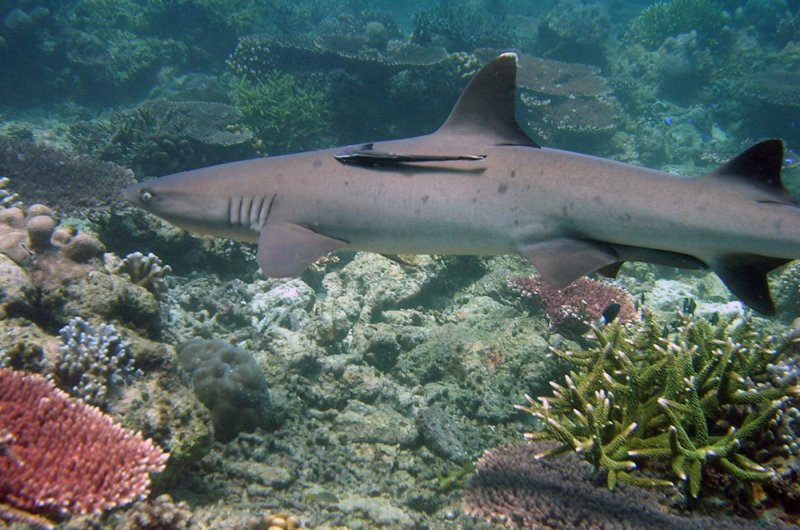
Whitetip reef shark at Tubbataha

Diving in the Philippines has been part of the tourism industry of the Philippines. Scuba diving in particular is regulated and managed by the Department of Tourism (DOT) through the Philippine Commission on Sports Scuba Diving (PCSSD).

The Philippines, as an archipelagic state in the Coral Triangle, is a popular destination for scuba diving tourism. The Tubbataha Reefs Natural Park, located at Sulu Sea, is declared as a UNESCO World Heritage Site

Diving is also a big part of the practice of underwater archeology in studying and protecting submerged cultural artifacts not limited to shipwrecks. The National Museum of the Philippines works with law enforcement to safeguard these materials.

== History ==
In 1978, the Philippine Commission on the Promotion and Development of Sports Scuba Diving was created through Letter of Instruction No. 745 dated September 29, 1978.

On July 28, 2008, Republic Act No. 9593 or "The Tourism Act of 2009", which mandated the PCSSD to provide the standard basic dive rules to all levels or kinds of divers, and regulate scuba sports and technical diving in the country, was approved.

In 2019, the DOT held the 1st Philippine International Dive Expo (Phidex) in Pasay.

On March 31, 2021, the Philippine Commission on Sports Scuba Diving issued the "Interim Guidelines for Application for Accreditation".

On September 2023, the Department of Tourism conducted the 1st Philippine Tourism Dive Dialogue.

== Tourism industry ==
In 2023, the Philippines' diving tourism industry generated ₱73 billion, an increase from ₱37 billion the year prior.

In August 2024, the Philippines won the best diving destination award in the 2024 Diving Resort Travel (DRT) held at Beijing.

== Facilities ==
=== Hyperbaric chamber centers ===
To support the tourism industry, the Tourism Infrastructure and Enterprise Zone Authority (TIEZA) has funded 10 hyperbaric chamber centers around the country.

== See also ==
- Decompression practice
- Decompression (diving)
- Decompression sickness
- Diving in the Maldives
- Diving in Timor-Leste
- Wildlife of the Philippines
- Writ of Kalikasan
