= Andreas Papadopoulos (sailor) =

Greek sailor

Personal information
- Nickname: Froulis
- Nationality: Greece
- Born: 20 December 1982 (age 43) Thessaloniki, Greece
- Height: 1.88 m (6 ft 2 in)
- Weight: 70 kg (154 lb)

Sailing career
- Sport: Sailing
- Club: Nautikos Omilos Thessaloniki
- Coached by: Athanasios Pachoumas
- Class: Dinghy

Andreas Papadopoulos (Greek: Ανδρέας Παπαδόπουλος; born 20 December 1982) is a Greek former sailor, who specialized in the two-person dinghy (470) class. Together with his partner and five-time Olympian Andreas Kosmatopoulos, he was named one of the country's top sailors in the double-handed dinghy for the 2008 Summer Olympics, finishing in the twelfth position. A member of the local sailing club in his native Thessaloniki, Papadopoulos trained most of his sporting career under the national federation's head coach for the men's 470, Kosmatopoulos' former partner from Barcelona 1992 Athanasios Pachoumas.

Papadopoulos competed for the Greek sailing squad, as a crew member in the men's 470 class, at the 2008 Summer Olympics in Beijing. He and skipper Kosmatopoulos topped the selection criteria in a duel with the quota recipients Panagiotis Kampouridis and Gerasimos Orologas to lock the country's 470 berth, based on their cumulative scores attained at four international regattas approved by the Hellenic Sailing Federation. The Greek duo managed to post a quarter of top-ten marks, including a third-place finish in race 8, throughout the series, before a substandard feat on the penultimate leg slipped their chances away from the medal round to the twelfth overall spot with 101 net points.
