= Mustafa Çakır =

Turkish yacht racer

Personal information
- Nationality: Turkish
- Born: December 15, 1986 (age 39) Sinop, Turkey
- Height: 1.83 m (6 ft 0 in) (2012)
- Weight: 85 kg (187 lb) (2012)

Sport
- Country: Turkey
- Sport: Sailing
- Event: Laser class
- Club: Heybeliada Aquatics Club, Istanbul
- Coached by: Saruhan Çınay
Medal record
Men's sailing
Representing Turkey
Laser 4.7 World Championships
Bronze medal – third place	2003 Çeşme	Laser 4.7
Europacup
Gold medal – first place	2012 Martigues	Laser 4.7

Mustafa Çakır (born December 15, 1986, in Sinop, Turkey) is a Turkish yacht racer competing in the Laser class. The 1.83 m (6 ft 0 in) tall athlete at 85 kg (187 lb) is a member of Heybeliada Aquatics Club in Istanbul, where he is coached by Saruhan Çınay.

He qualified for participation at the 2012 Summer Olympics, finishing in 39th place.

He won the Laser-Europacup 2012 held in Martigues, France.

== Achievements ==
Year	Competition	Venue	Position	Event	Notes
Representing Turkey
2002	Laser Europe Cup	Netherlands	5th		
2002	Laser 4.7 World U18 Championships	Netherlands	10th		
2003	Laser 4.7 World U18 Championships	Çeşme, Turkey	3rd	Laser 4.7	
2011	Turkish Sailing Championships		2nd		
2012	Laser – Europacup	Martigues, France	1st	Laser 4.7	
