= Vaavu =

Vaavu may have more than one meaning:

- Vaavu Atoll, an administrative division of the Maldives.
- Vaavu, the ninth consonant of the Thaana abugida used in Dhivehi.
