= Thinadhoo =

Thinadhoo may refer to several islands in the Maldives:

- Thinadhoo (Huvadhu Atoll), the capital of Gaafu Dhaalu region, Huvadhu Atoll
- Thinadhoo (Vaavu Atoll)
- Thinadhoo, a disappeared island of Haa Alif Atoll

== See also ==
- Thiladhoo, an uninhabited island of Baa Atoll
