= Tetsuya Matsunaga =

Japanese sailor (born 1979)

Personal information
- Nationality: Japan
- Born: 15 April 1979 (age 47) Kyoto, Japan
- Height: 1.70 m (5 ft 7 in)
- Weight: 57 kg (126 lb)

Sailing career
- Sport: Sailing
- Club: Three Bond Sailing Team
- Coached by: Kenji Nakamura
- Class: Dinghy

Tetsuya Matsunaga (松永 鉄也, Matsunaga Tetsuya; born 15 April 1979 in Kyoto) is a Japanese sailor, who specialized in two-person dinghy (470) class. He represented Japan, along with his partner Taro Ueno, at the 2008 Summer Olympics, and has also been training for Three Bond Sailing Team in Kyoto throughout most of his sporting career under his longtime coach and mentor Kenji Nakamura. As of September 2014, Matsunaga is ranked twenty-sixth in the world for two-person dinghy class by the International Sailing Federation, following his successes at the South American Championships, ISAF Sailing World Cup Series, and 2014 ISAF Sailing World Championships in Santander, Spain.

Matsunaga qualified as a skipper for the Japanese squad in the men's 470 class at the 2008 Summer Olympics in Beijing by placing fifteenth and receiving a berth from the World Championships in Melbourne, Australia. Teaming with crew member Taro Ueno in the eleven-race series, the Japanese duo mounted a marvelous lead in the opening leg, but came up short for the medal with a net score of 97 and a seventh-place finish in a fleet of twenty-nine boats.

At the 2014 ISAF Sailing World Championships, Matsunaga and his new partner Yugo Yoshida set a career record with a sixth-place finish in the men's 470 class to secure their spot on the Japanese sailing team for the 2016 Summer Olympics.
