= Diving in the Maldives =

Recreational diving region description

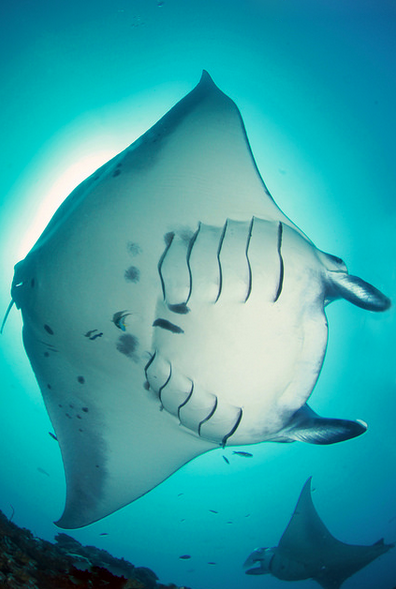
Manta rays (Manta birostris) taken at Himandhoo Manta Point, Maldives

The Maldives, officially the Republic of Maldives, is a small archipelagic state in South Asia. It lies in the Indian Ocean southwest of Sri Lanka and India, about 700 kilometres (430 mi) from the Asian continent's mainland. The chain of 26 atolls stretches across the Equator from Ihavandhippolhu Atoll in the north to Addu Atoll in the south. The land area is roughly 298 square kilometres (115 sq mi). Malé is the capital.

The Maldives has white sand beaches, coral reefs, clear warm waters, numerous scuba diving sites and rich marine life. Most holiday resorts in the Maldives have a scuba diving facility and there are a number of liveaboard operators offering scuba diving cruise holidays.

In the 1998 global coral bleaching, much of the coral in the Maldives was bleached due to the El Niño event combined with global warming. In 2016, global warming and the El Nino event heated the Maldives, which, with land reclamation and water pollution, bleached and killed 75% of corals in the Maldives.

== History ==
The Maldives has been growing in popularity as a scuba diving destination since the 1970s when the number of resorts began to increase.

In May 2026, five Italian nationals died during a recreational dive at Vaavu Atoll. Maldivian military office Sgt. Mohamed Mahudhee died during an attempted recovery of the bodies of the deceased. A Finnish recovery team successfully retrieved all the victims involved in the tragedy.

== Statistics ==
Tourist arrivals to the Maldives have been growing steadily for the past ten years, with the exception of 2005 (the year after the tsunami), when the numbers dropped. Around 700,000 tourists visit the Maldives each year (2008).

== Impact of climate change on the underwater environment ==
Climate change has severely impacted coral reefs around the world as has been widely reported such as the effects of the El Niño in late 1990s, according to some around 60%-80% of the corals have been bleached in several areas in the world including the Maldives reefs.

== Impact of tourism on the underwater environment ==
Reports have described the socio-economic impact on the environment as a result of mass tourism expansion in the Maldives.

== Diving destinations and sites ==
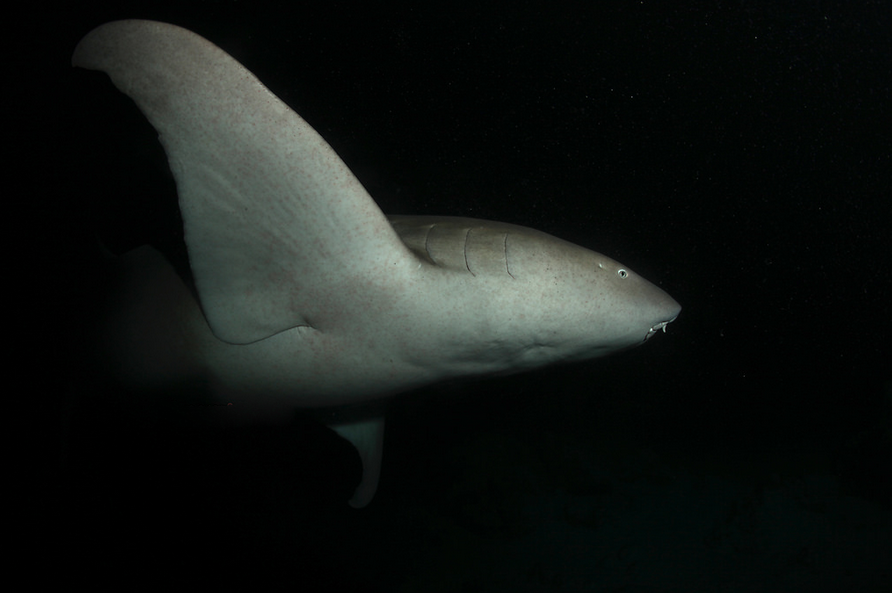
Nurse sharks (Ginglymostoma cirratum) taken on a night dive in Alimatha Maldives

The Maldives comprises mainly open water, with only 1% of the country being land-based. The land is spread over 1,192 islets, each of which forms part of an atoll. In total, there are 26 atolls in the Maldives. The following atolls are home to some of the dive sites.

The Maldives offers different types of dives, but most are characterized by medium to strong currents.

Each island in the Maldives has its own lagoon, which is usually not very deep.

Terminology:

- A thila is an underwater pinnacle.
- Kandu are diving spots around the border of the atoll.

=== Ari Atoll ===
Located in the western part of the Maldives, Ari Atoll is one of the largest atolls and has a wide selection of dive sites, including:

- Diguri Guri: A dive site near Ellaidhoo.
- Broken Rock: A dive site named for the large broken rock at its center. It is home to soft and hard coral formations that attract a wide variety of reef fish.
- Gangehi Kandu: Recommended only for advanced scuba divers, the Gangehi Kandu is a dive site in the northern part of the Ari Atoll. Currents here can be an issue, and the site should only be dived when the currents are flowing into the site.
- Hukrueli Faru: Also known as Rangali Madivaru or just Madivaru, Hukrueli Faru has a colorful coral reef.
- Kudarah Thila: Declared a "Protected Marine Area" by the Maldivian government, Kudarah Thila is a dive site with incoming currents.
- Maalhos Thila: Maalhos Thila is only suitable for advanced scuba divers because the main part of the dive site lies deeper than 25 metres. Because of the strong currents, a safety float must be deployed to monitor divers' location.
- Maaya Thila: A spot for daytime and night-time scuba diving. However, when currents are strong it is recommended for only advanced divers and they will need to deploy a safety float.
- Mushi Mas Mingili Thila: Fish Head or Mushi Mas Mingili is a popular dive sites in the Maldives.
- Kalhahandi Kandu: Kalhahandi Kandu is recommended mainly for advanced scuba divers.
- Gudrun Faru: Recommended only for advanced scuba divers and good snorkelers, the Gudrun Faru reef is in the northern part of the Ari Atoll.

=== Baa Atoll ===
- The Blue Hole: A 22-meter underwater cave/chimney. Swim through, stingrays, blacktip reef sharks, moray eels, lionfish. The reef starts at around 1m with the top of the Blue Hole at around 6m, with a small exit at 12m and the bottom exit at around 22m.
- Milaidhoo Caves: The top of the reef is at around 3m, sloping down to a sandy bottom at up to 40m with many small caves and overhangs along the reef wall.
- Dhega Thila: The top of this thila is at 13m and there is a canyon at 24m. This advanced level dive site slopes down to 30m with interesting rock formations.
- Dhigu Thila: This long, narrow thila is at 9m to 30m, and along the edge there are many caves and overhangs.
- Dhonfanu Thila: This thila extends from 9m down to 35m, with some caves to explore and the swim-through starts at 25m.
- Dharavandhoo Thila: The shallowest part of this thila is 6m, going down to 30m. There are caves at different depths and an abundance of marine life.
- Nelivaru Thila: Starting at 5m, this thila is a hotspot for manta rays during the season, but throughout the year there is a vast assortment of marine life to see. Rock formations, fan corals, nurse sharks, stingrays, and schooling fishes
- Dhigali Thila: The top of this thila is at 10m, and it extends down to 30m, with canyons and caves to explore.
- Aidhoo Corner: The shallow top reef at 3-5m slopes down to more than 40m. This corner dive on Aidhoo island has soft coral, groups of snappers and overhangs.

=== South Malé Atoll ===
The Male Atoll is divided into 2 sections, the North Male Atoll and the South Male Atoll.

- Cocoa Corner (Cocoa Thila): A dive site that can be explored in several different ways. With the right current and conditions, it is the best shark show around Male Atoll. A safety float is required, and divers should be prepared to make a midwater safety stop.
- Guraidhoo Kandu South: Currents here are strong, making this a dive site appropriate only for advanced, experienced scuba divers. Divers should be very cautious at this dive site, as the currents can pull them away from the reef and there is often underwater turbulence.

=== North Malé Atoll ===
The North Male Atoll is one of the most developed atolls in terms of hotel and resort development.

- Banana Reef: Currents can be strong at times around this reef, with occasional turbulence occurring around the overhangs. The use of a safety float is recommended.
- Kuda Haa: Kuda Haa is a pinnacle, or thila, dive.

=== Addu Atoll ===
Addu Atoll is the only area in the Maldives that was not affected by the 1998 global coral bleaching.

- British Loyalty: The wreck is 134 metres long and lies at a depth of 33 metres, on its port side.
- Kottey Outside: A series of plateaus, with a steep drop off.
- Turtle Point: A possibility of waves, surge and currents. A lot of coral damage on most of the reef due to the wave action.
- Bodu Hoholha: Wall diving site near to a man-made channel which is used by local fishing boats so divers should look and listen for boat traffic when ascending.
- Maa Kandu Outside: Easy reef wall dive.
- Mahaala: Maahala is on the end of Kuda Kan'du Channel, behind Fihali Fara. There may be surge and surf at the top of the reef, particularly in the shallower areas.

=== Fuvahmulah Atoll ===
On the Fuvuahmulah atoll, divers may have the opportunity to encounter up to seven types of rare sharks. See dozens of tiger sharks, and observe thresher sharks in the cleaning stations, as well as oceanic mantas.

- Tiger shark point: A shallow dive, mainly stationnary accessible to all levels.
- Hude Kede: Thresher sharks cleaning station.
- Fari Kede: Highlight of Fuvahmulah, with the right conditions expect the unexpected.

== Marine biodiversity ==
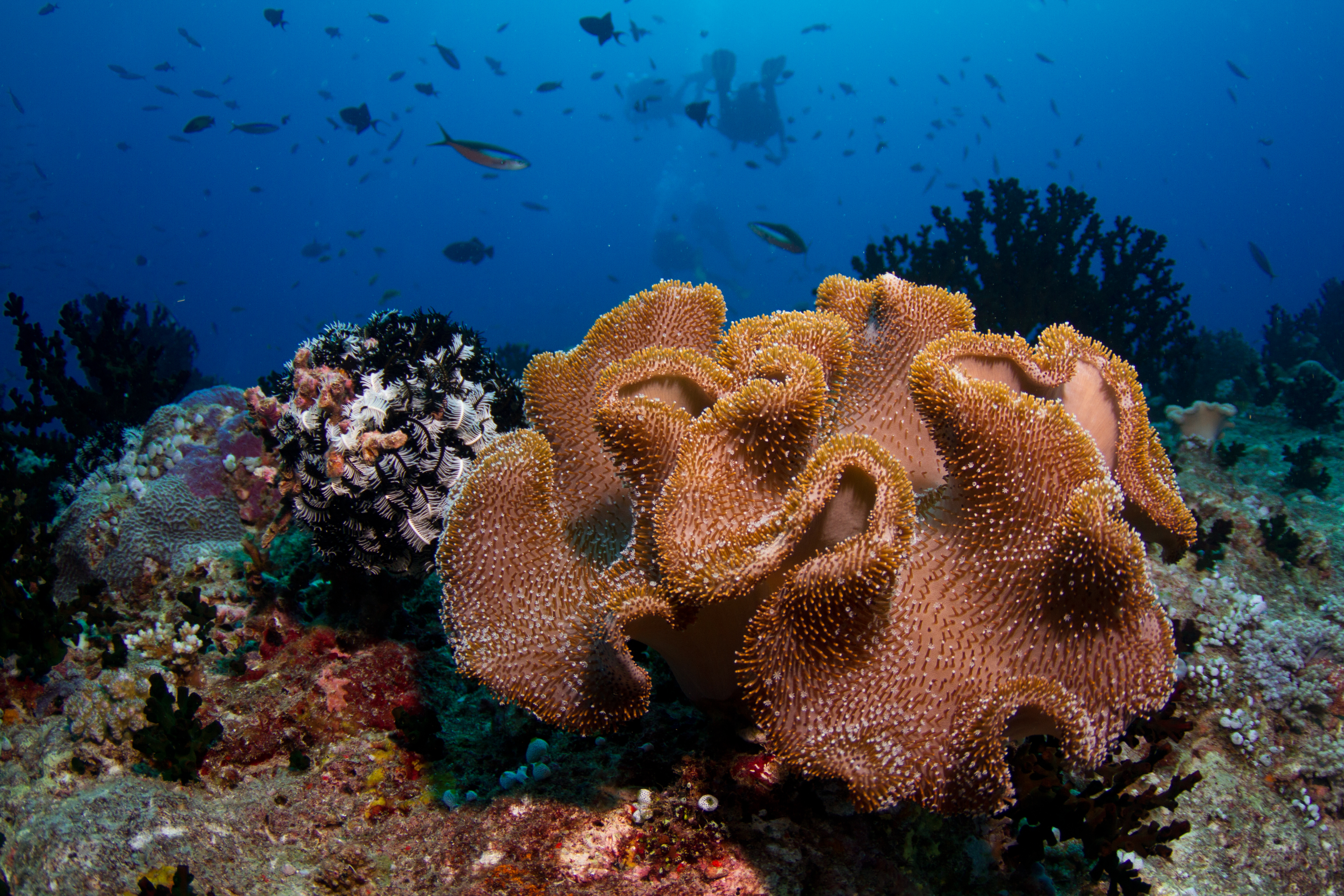
Maldives soft coral

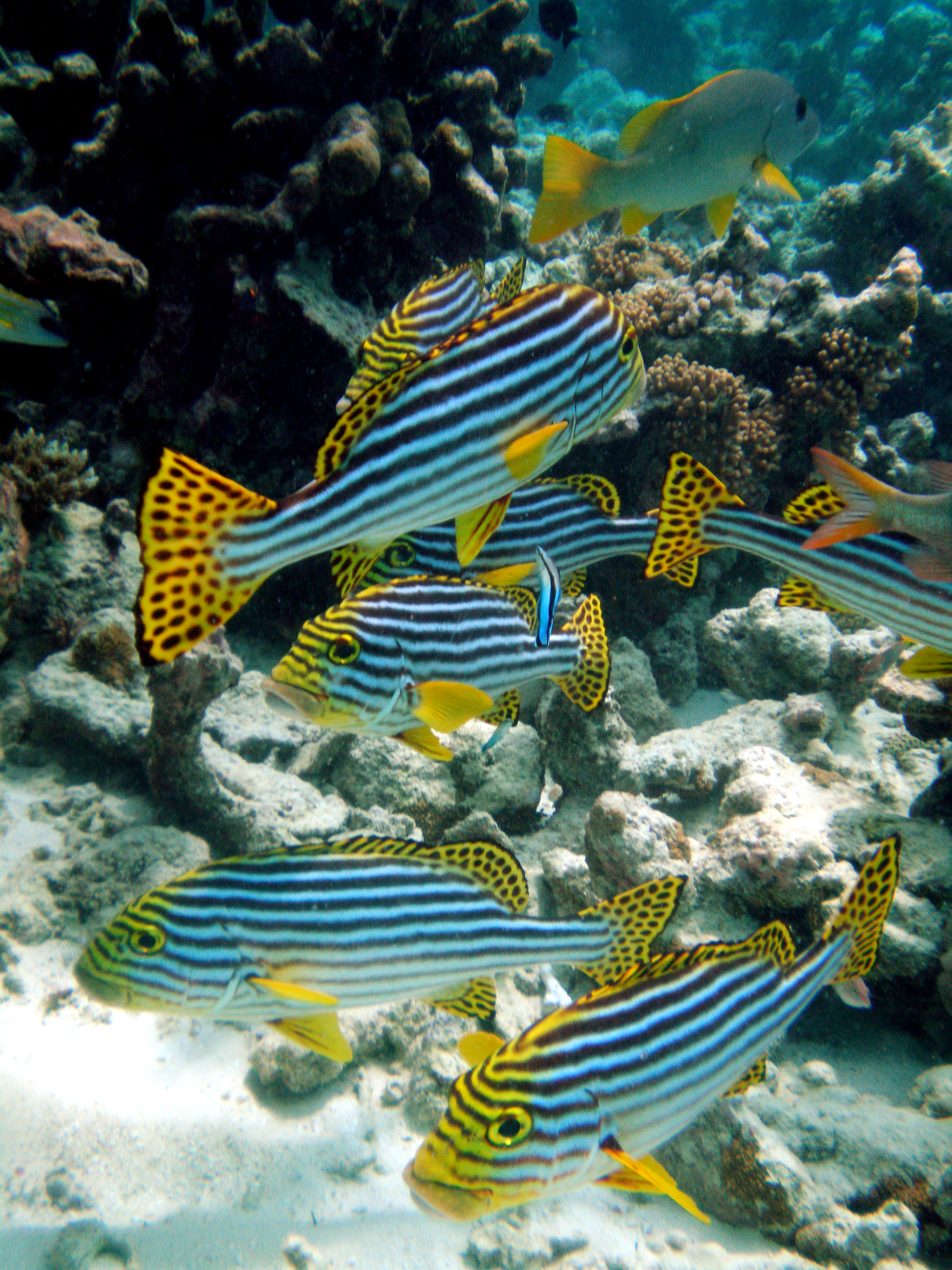
Oriental sweetlips (Plectorhinchus vittatus) at Meeru Island, North Male Atoll

The Maldives have a range of different habitats including deep sea, shallow coast, and reef ecosystems, fringing mangroves, wetlands and dry land. There are 187 species of coral forming the coral reefs. This area of the Indian Ocean, alone, houses 1,100 species of fish, 5 species of sea turtle, 21 species of whale and dolphin, 400 species of mollusc, and 83 species of echinoderms. The area is also populated by a number of crustacean species: 120 copepods, 15 amphipods, more than 145 crab and 48 shrimp species.

Among the many marine families represented are pufferfish, fusiliers, jackfish, lionfish, oriental sweetlips, reef sharks, groupers, eels, snappers, bannerfish, batfish, humphead wrasse, spotted eagle rays, scorpionfish, lobsters, nudibranches, angelfish, butterflyfish, squirrelfish, soldierfish, glassfish, surgeonfish, unicornfish, triggerfish, Napoleon wrasse, and barracuda.

These coral reefs provide habitats to a variety of marine organisms that vary from plankton to whale sharks.

== Facilities and legal constraints ==
- Medical facilities for treatment of diving injuries.
- Legal constraints on underwater activity. The Maldives Recreational Diving Regulation, 2003 requires that recreational diving service providers are to be licensed. No recreational diving is allowed deeper than 30 meters or requiring decompression stops. Divers must show evidence of certification and recent experience, and solo diving is forbidden.
- Service infrastructure for scuba tourism
