= Taro Ueno =

Japanese sailor (born 1980)

Personal information
- Nationality: Japan
- Born: 3 September 1980 (age 45) Fukuoka, Japan
- Height: 1.82 m (6 ft 0 in)
- Weight: 72 kg (159 lb)

Sailing career
- Sport: Sailing
- Club: Three Bond Sailing Team
- Coached by: Kenji Nakamura
- Class: Dinghy

Taro Ueno (上野 太郎, Ueno Taro; born 3 September 1980 in Fukuoka) is a Japanese sailor, who specialized in two-person dinghy (470) class. He represented Japan, along with his partner Tetsuya Matsunaga, at the 2008 Summer Olympics, and has also been training for Three Bond Sailing Team in Kyoto throughout his sporting career under his longtime coach and mentor Kenji Nakamura.

Ueno qualified as crew member for the Japanese squad in the men's 470 class at the 2008 Summer Olympics in Beijing, by placing fifteenth and receiving a berth from the World Championships in Melbourne, Australia. Teaming up with skipper Matsunaga in the eleven-race series, the Japanese duo mounted a marvelous lead in the opening leg, but came up short for the medal with a net score of 97 and a seventh-place finish in a fleet of twenty-nine boats.
