= Rakeedhoo =

Rakeedhoo ރަކީދޫ
- Inhabited island
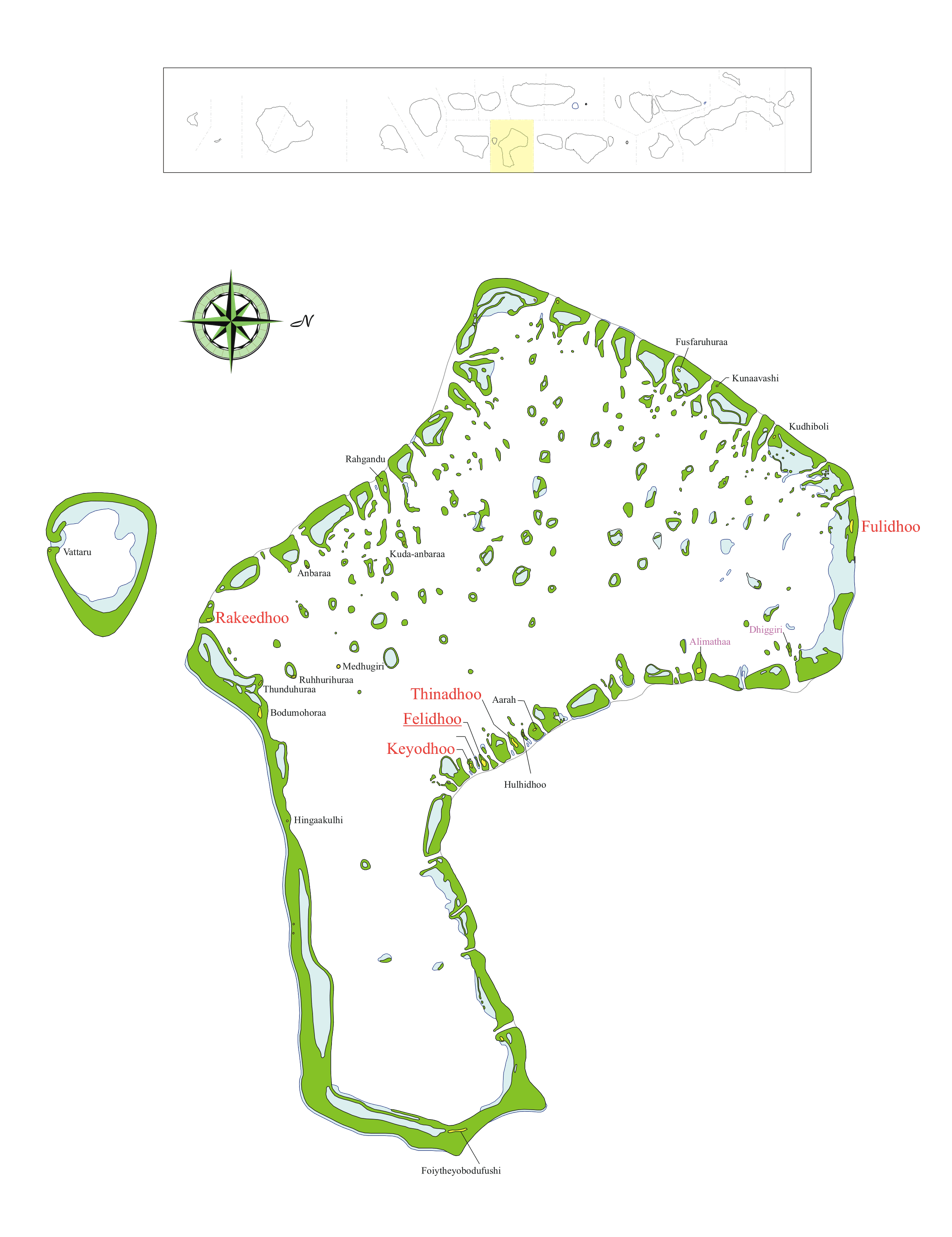
- Vaavu Atoll

- Location in Maldives
- Coordinates: 03°18′55″N 73°28′10″E
- Country: Maldives
- Administrative atoll: Vaavu Atoll
- Distance to Malé: 95.2 km (59.2 mi)

Area
  - Total: 6.2 ha (15 acres)

Population (2022)
  - Total: 76
  - Density: 1,200/km^{2} (3,200/sq mi)
- Time zone: UTC+05:00 (MST)

Rakeedhoo (Dhivehi: ރަކީދޫ) is one of the inhabited islands of Vaavu Atoll, which is an administrative division of the Maldives.

== Geography ==
The island is 95.2 km (59 mi; 51 nmi) south of the country's capital, Malé. The land area of the island was 6.2 ha (15 acres) in 2018. The land area is up from about 4 ha (9.9 acres) in 2007. In 2003, the island was described as the smallest of the inhabited islands in the atoll.

== Demography ==
Historical population
Year	Pop.	±%
2006	158	—
2014	101	−36.1%
2022	76	−24.8%
2006-2022: Census populations Source:

== Healthcare ==
Rakeedhoo has a pharmacy.
