= Heikki Elomaa =

Finnish sailor

Personal information
- Full name: Heikki Elomaa
- Nickname: Heka
- Nationality: Finland
- Born: 9 July 1986 (age 39) Helsinki, Finland
- Height: 1.83 m (6 ft 0 in)
- Weight: 75 kg (165 lb)

Sailing career
- Sport: Sailing
- Club: Helsingfors Segelklubb
- Coached by: Enrico Fonda (ITA)
- Class: Dinghy

Heikki Elomaa (born 9 July 1986) is a Finnish former sailor, who specialized in the two-person dinghy (470) class. Together with his partner Niklas Lindgren, he was named one of the country's top sailors in the double-handed dinghy for the 2008 Summer Olympics, finishing in a distant twenty-seventh place. A member of the local sailing club in his native Helsinki (Finnish: Helsingfors Segelklubb), Elomaa trained for the Games under the tutelage of his Italian-born personal coach Enrico Fonda.

Elomaa competed for the Finnish sailing squad, as a crew member in the men's 470 class, at the 2008 Summer Olympics in Beijing. Two months earlier, he and skipper Niklas topped the selection over the quota recipients Niko Helander and Joonas Lindgren for their country's 470 berth, based on the cumulative scores attained in a couple of international regattas, stipulated by the Finnish Sailing Federation. The Finnish duo clearly struggled to catch a vast fleet of sailing crews from behind under breezy conditions, with marks lower than the top thirteen at the end of the ten-race series, sitting them in a distant twenty-seventh overall with 196 net points.
