= Kim Hyeong-tae =

South Korean sailor (born 1971)

Personal information
- Nationality: South Korea
- Born: 24 April 1971 (age 55) Yeosu, Jeollanam-do, South Korea
- Height: 1.76 m (5 ft 9 1/2 in)
- Weight: 71 kg (157 lb)

Sailing career
- Sport: Sailing
- Club: Boryeong Si Cheong
- Coached by: Petri Leskinen (FIN)
- Classes: Dinghy and keelboat
Medal record
Men's sailing
Representing South Korea
Asian Games
| Silver medal – second place | 1998 Bangkok | 420 |
| Bronze medal – third place | 2006 Doha | Match racing |

Kim Hyeong-tae (Korean: 김형태; born 24 April 1971) is a South Korean former sailor, who specialized in the two-person dinghy (470) class. Together with his partner and two-time Olympian Yoon Cheul, he received a bronze medal in the inaugural match-race keelboat at the 2006 Asian Games in Doha and was named one of the country's top sailors in the double-handed dinghy for the 2008 Summer Olympics, finishing distantly within the top 25 range. A member of Boryeong City Hall's sailing club in Jeollanam-do's coastline, Kim trained most of his sporting career under the national federation's head coach for the men's 470, three-time Olympian Petri Leskinen from Finland.

Kim competed for the South Korean sailing squad, as a 37-year-old crew member in the men's 470 class, at the 2008 Summer Olympics in Beijing. He and skipper Yoon topped the selection criteria for the country's 470 slot in a three-way battle with double Asian Games champions Kim Dae-young and Jung Sung-ahn and quota recipients Kim Chang-ju and Kim Ji-hoon, based on their cumulative scores attained in a series of international regattas approved by the Korea Sailing Federation. The Korean pair clearly struggled to catch a vast fleet of world sailors under breezy conditions in the initial half of the series, until they found solace to pull off a blistering top-three mark in race 7, trailing the Belarusians and the Americans. Another set of poor performances towards the final stretch, however, pushed both Kim and Yoon to the near end of the 29-crew fleet, sitting them in twenty-fifth overall with 180 net points.
