= Yoon Cheul =

South Korean sailor

Personal information
- Full name: Yoon Cheul
- Nickname: Pole
- Nationality: South Korea
- Born: 3 January 1971 (age 55) Yeosu, Jeollanam-do, South Korea
- Height: 1.84 m (6 ft 1/2 in)
- Weight: 74 kg (163 lb)

Sailing career
- Sport: Sailing
- Club: Boryeong Si Cheong
- Coached by: Petri Leskinen (FIN)
- Classes: Dinghy and keelboat
Medal record
Men's sailing
Representing South Korea
Asian Games
Bronze medal – third place	2006 Doha	Match racing

Yoon Cheul (Korean: 윤철, also known as Yun Cheol, born 3 January 1971) is a South Korean former sailor, who specialized in the two-person dinghy (470) class. He copped a bronze medal in the inaugural match-race keelboat at the 2006 Asian Games in Doha and was named one of the country's top sailors in the double-handed dinghy for two editions of the Summer Olympic Games (1992 and 2008), finishing each distantly within the top 25 range, respectively. A member of Boryeong City Hall's sailing club in Jeollanam-do's coastline, Yoon trained most of his sporting career under the national federation's head coach for the men's 470, three-time Olympian Petri Leskinen from Finland.

Yoon made his Olympic debut, as a 21-year-old, in Barcelona 1992. There, he and eventual four-time Olympian Jung Sung-ahn accumulated a satisfying net grade of 145 to obtain the twenty-second overall position from a fleet of 37 registered crews in the men's 470 class.

Sixteen years after his maiden Games, Yoon led the inexperienced South Korean sailing squad and competed for the second time, as a 37-year-old skipper in the men's 470 class, at the 2008 Summer Olympics in Beijing. He and his new partner Kim Hyeong-tae topped the selection criteria for the country's 470 slot in a three-way battle with double Asian Games champions Kim Dae-young and Jung Sung-ahn and quota recipients Kim Chang-ju and Kim Ji-hoon, based on their cumulative scores attained in a series of international regattas approved by the Korea Sailing Federation. The Korean pair clearly struggled to catch a vast fleet of world sailors under breezy conditions in the initial half of the series, until they found solace to pull off a blistering top-three mark in race 7, trailing the Belarusians and the Americans. Another set of poor performances towards the final stretch, however, pushed both Yoon and Kim to the near end of the 29-crew fleet, sitting them in twenty-fifth overall with 180 net points.
