= Keyodhoo (Vaavu Atoll) =

Keyodhoo ކެޔޮދޫ
- Inhabited island
- Location in Maldives
- Coordinates: 03°27′45″N 73°32′57″E
- Country: Maldives
- Administrative atoll: Vaavu Atoll
- Distance to Malé: 78.95 km (49.06 mi)

Area
  - Total: 0.073 km^{2} (0.028 sq mi)

Dimensions
  - Length: 0.500 km (0.311 mi)
  - Width: 0.250 km (0.155 mi)

Population (2022)
  - Total: 641
  - Density: 8,800/km^{2} (23,000/sq mi)
- Time zone: UTC+05:00 (MST)

Keyodhoo (Dhivehi: ކެޔޮދޫ) is the most populous of the islands of the Vaavu Atoll, an administrative division of the Maldives island nation.

== Geography ==
The island is 78.95 km (49 mi; 43 nmi) south of the country's capital, Malé. The land area of the island is 11.9 ha (29 acres) in 2018. The land area is up from about 7.3 ha (18 acres) in 2007. Mangroves have been reported on the island.

== Demography ==
The island has a total population of more than 600 people making it the most populous island with the other islands ranging from 200-500 people. The island has a male-to-female ratio of 1.09. This is unusual because while the other islands of the Vaavu Atoll have sex distribution that is largely the same, this island had approximately 9% more males.

In 2002, the island had an average household size of 4.7 which makes it the smallest following behind Thinadhoo at 4.9 people per household.

Historical population
Year	Pop.	±%
2006	510	—
2014	635	+24.5%
2022	641	+0.9%
2006-2022: Census populations Source:

== Health ==
A health center has been established at the island replacing a smaller health post in the past. The island has reportedly have adequate toilet facilities with only 5% (around 7 households) not having any.

=== Water ===
The islands of the atoll, including Keyodhoo, receives an adequate supply of drinking water from rain throughout the year which is stored in large cement water tanks or PVC cylindrical tanks. Keyodhoo has the most stored water having 200,000 liters compared to the other islands which have less than 100,000 liters.

== Transport ==
By 2003, a harbour had been built for the island. It has been built to safely facilitate fishing and transport vessels.
