= Fulidhoo =

Fulidhoo ފުލިދޫ
- Inhabited island
- Location in Maldives
- Coordinates: 03°40′50″N 73°24′53″E
- Country: Maldives
- Geographic atoll: Vaavu Atoll
- Administrative atoll: Vaavu Atoll
- Distance to Malé: 55.7 km (34.6 mi)

Dimensions
  - Length: 0.675 km (0.419 mi)
  - Width: 0.200 km (0.124 mi)

Population (2022)
  - Total: 400
- Time zone: UTC+05:00 (MST)

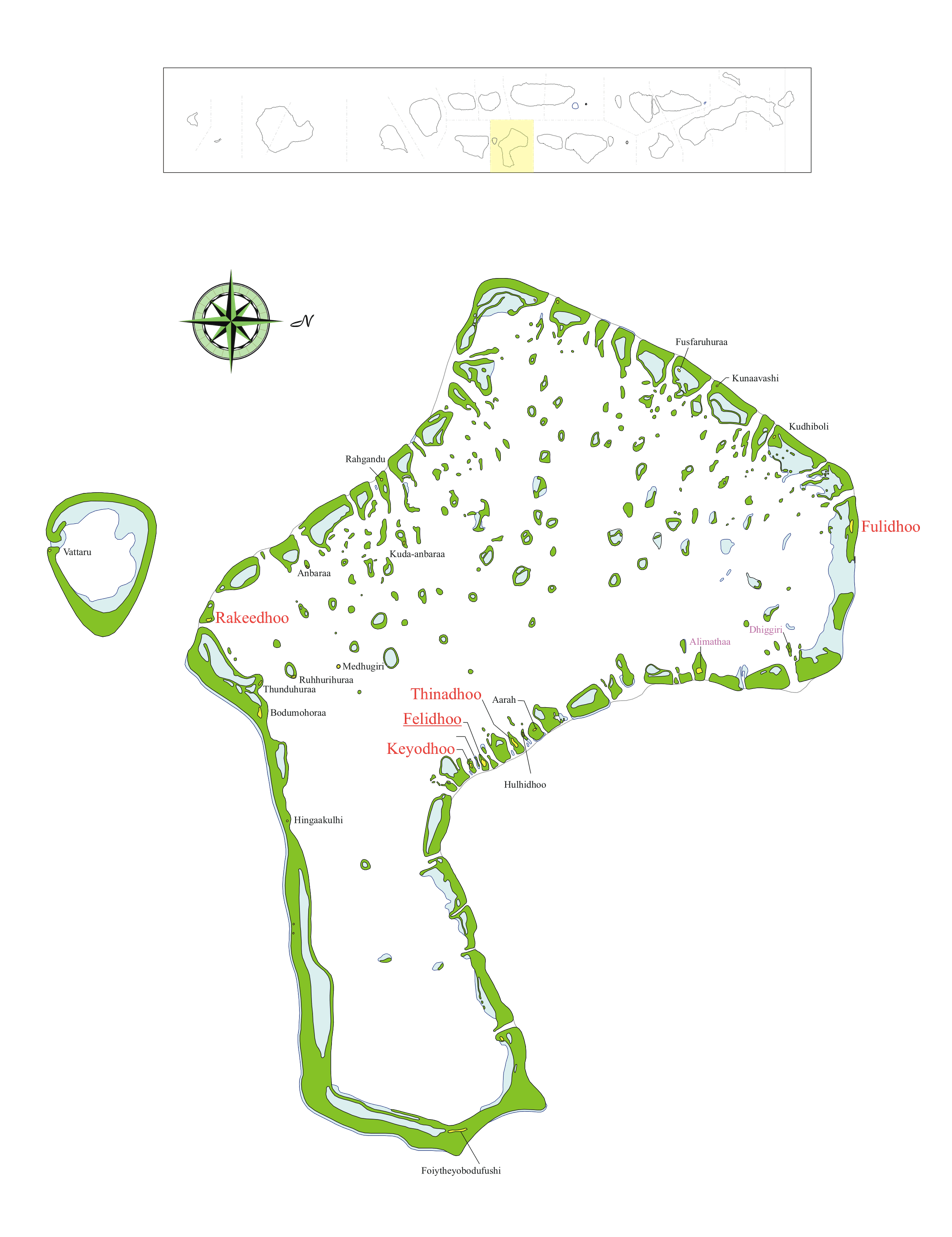

Fulidhoo (Dhivehi: ފުލިދޫ) is the most northern of the inhabited islands of Vaavu Atoll in the Maldives. It is famous for Maldivian cultural events like Langiri, a traditional dance with drums and Thaara.

== Geography ==
Fulidhoo is one of the islands of the Vaavu Atoll. Located in the Laccadive Sea, the island is 55.7 km (35 mi; 30 nmi) south of the country's capital, Malé. The land area of the island is 11.3 ha (28 acres) in 2018, up from 9.7 ha (24 acres) in 2007. The island has a large lagoon, which is used as a natural harbour.

== Demography ==
Historical population
Year	Pop.	±%
2006	331	—
2014	324	−2.1%
2022	400	+23.5%
2006-2022: Census populations Source:

== Economy ==
In 2012, Fulidhoo had two fishing vessels. The majority of the catch was of fish from the Lutjanidae (snappers) and Carangidae (jacks) families.

== Healthcare ==
Fulidhoo has a health center and a pharmacy.

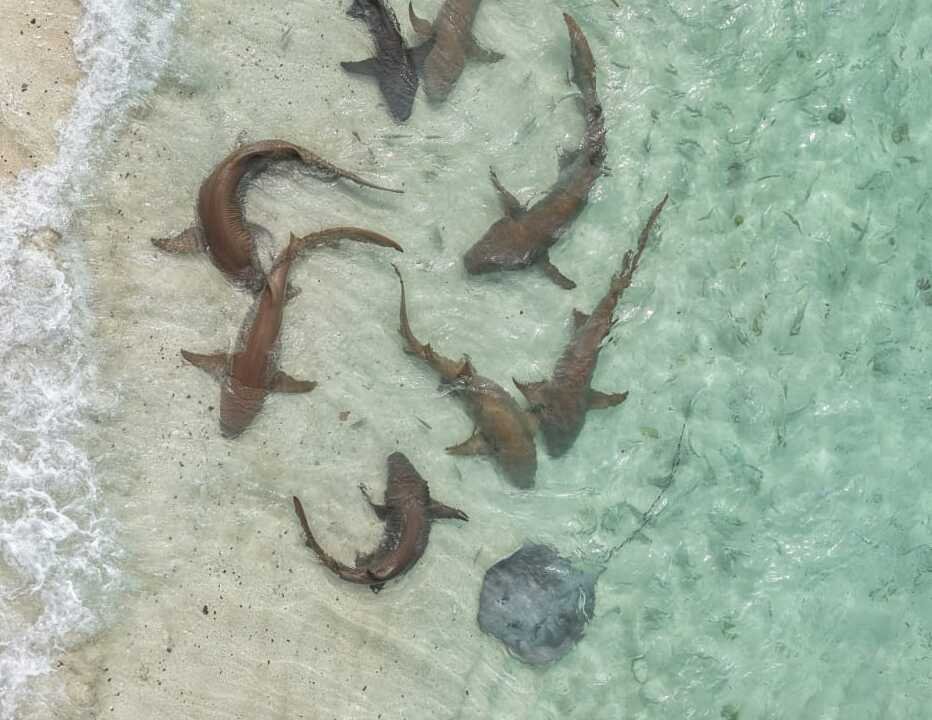
Nurse Sharks at Fulhidoo
