= Thinadhoo (Vaavu Atoll) =

Thinadhoo ތިނަދޫ
- Inhabited island
- Location in Maldives
- Coordinates: 03°29′20″N 73°32′21″E
- Country: Maldives
- Administrative atoll: Vaavu Atoll
- Distance to Malé: 75.97 km (47.21 mi)

Dimensions
  - Length: 0.630 km (0.391 mi)
  - Width: 0.200 km (0.124 mi)

Population (2022)
  - Total: 258
- Time zone: UTC+05:00 (MST)

Thinadhoo (Dhivehi: ތިނަދޫ) is one of the inhabited islands of Vaavu Atoll in the Maldives.

The island is widely used for tourism and guest house business is rapidly increasing in the island.

== Geography ==
The island is located in the Heart of the Atoll, along with the 2 other inhabited islands of Felidhoo and Keyodhoo. The island is 75.97 km (47 mi; 41 nmi) south of the country's capital, Malé. The land area of the island is 12.7 ha (31 acres) in 2018. The land area is about 9.1 ha (22 acres) bigger than it was in 2007.

== Demography ==
In 2006, the island was described as the least populated island in the country.

Historical population
Year	Pop.	±%
2006	55	—
2014	73	+32.7%
2022	258	+253.4%
Census populations Source:

== Healthcare ==
Thinadhoo has a pharmacy operated by STO.
