= Olivier Bausset =

French sailor (born 1982)

Olympic medal record

Sailing

Representing France
Bronze medal – third place	2008 Beijing	Men's 470

Olivier Bausset (born 1 February 1982) is a French sailor and Olympic athlete who won a bronze medal at the 2008 Summer Olympics.
