= Felidhoo =

Felidhoo ފެލިދޫ
- Inhabited island
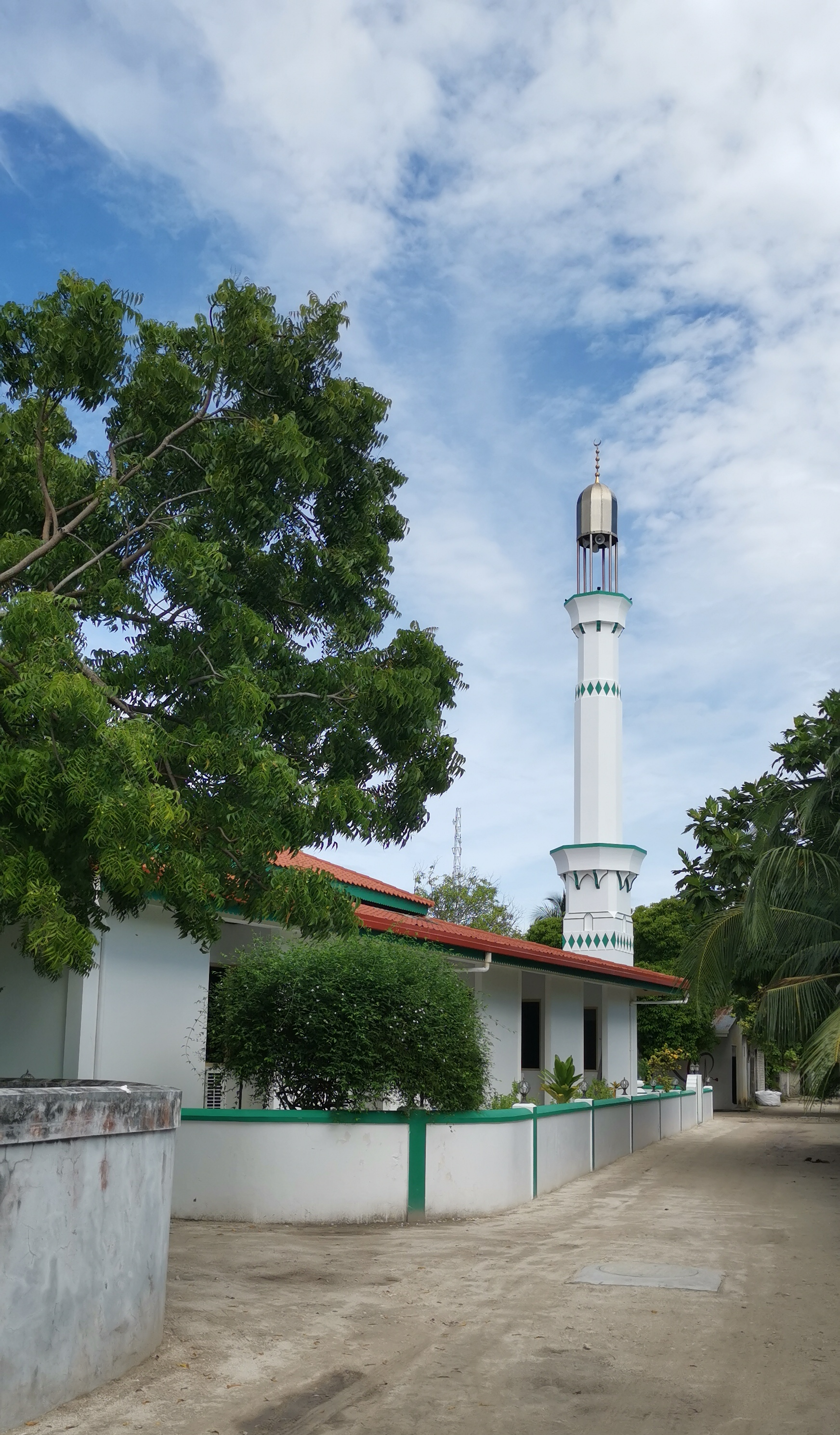

- Location in Maldives
- Coordinates: 03°28′18″N 73°32′50″E
- Country: Maldives
- Geographic atoll: Felidhu Atoll
- Administrative atoll: Vaavu Atoll
- Distance to Malé: 77.92 km (48.42 mi)

Population (2022)
  - Total: 620
- Time zone: UTC+05:00 (MST)

Felidhoo (Dhivehi: ފެލިދޫ) is one of the inhabited islands of Vaavu Atoll in the Maldives.

== Geography ==
The island is 77.92 km (48 mi; 42 nmi) south of the country's capital, Malé. The land area of the island is 14.2 ha (35 acres) in 2018. The island had an area of about 11.8 ha (29 acres) in 2003, when it was described as the largest inhabited island of the atoll. The island has a reef on either side, Masfalhi Falhu to the north and Saalanfalhu to the south.

== Demography ==
Historical population
Year	Pop.	±%
2006	448	—
2014	489	+9.2%
2022	620	+26.8%
2006-2022: Census populations Source:

== Healthcare ==
Felidhoo has a pharmacy.
