= Laser 4.7 =

Laser sailboat model

- Class symbol

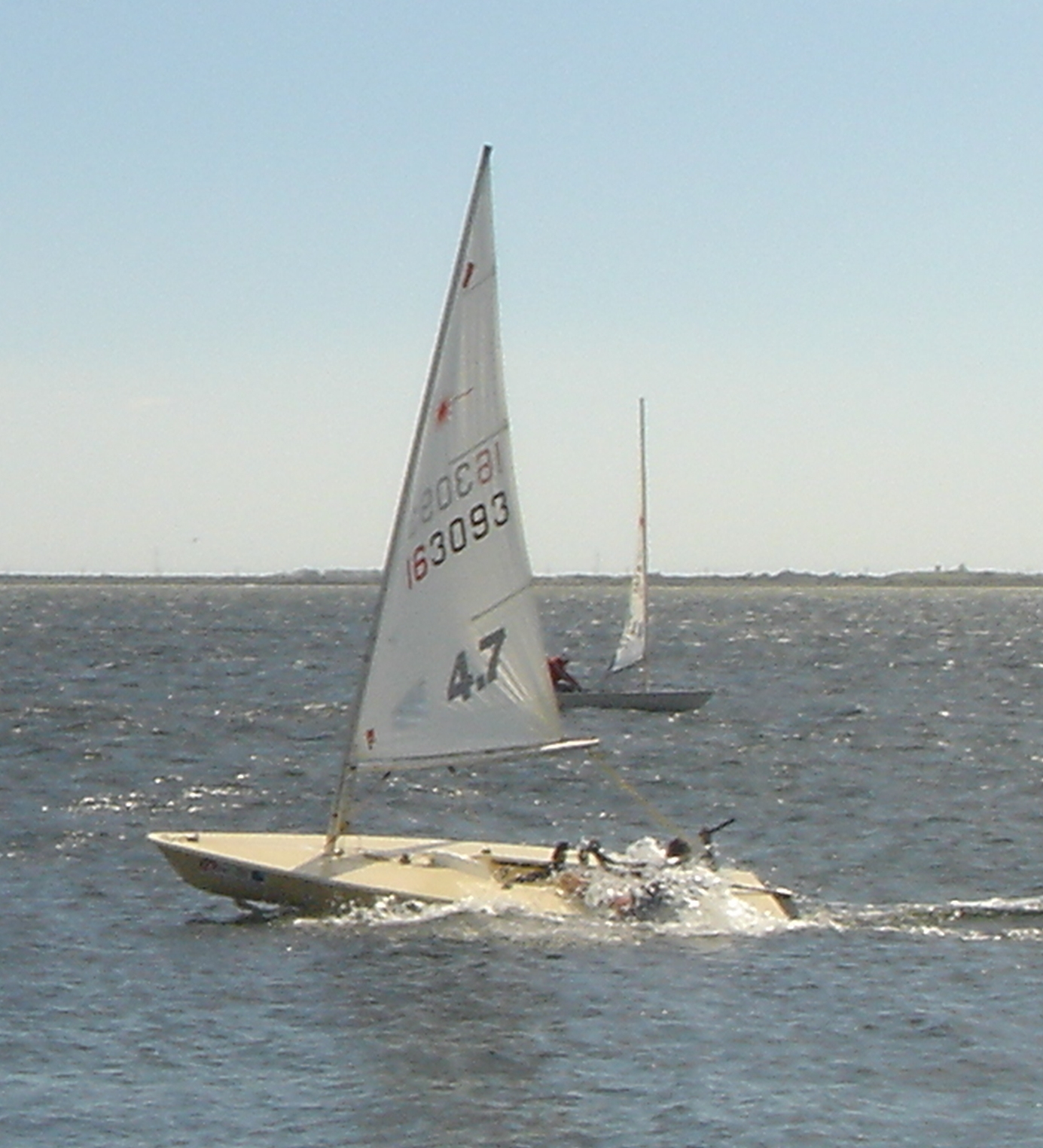
- Laser 4.7

Development
- Role: Junior development class

Boat
- Crew: 1
- Draft: 0.787 m (2 ft 7.0 in)

Hull
- Construction: Fiberglass
- Hull weight: 58.97 kg (130.0 lb)
- LOA: 4.2 m (13 ft 9 in)
- LWL: 3.81 m (12 ft 6 in)
- Beam: 1.39 m (4 ft 7 in)

Sails
- Mainsail area: 4.7 m^{2} (51 sq ft)

Racing
- D-PN: 95.4
- RYA PN: 1175

The Laser 4.7 or ILCA 4 is a one-design dinghy class in the Laser series and is a one-design class of sailboat. All Lasers are built to the same specifications. The Laser is 4.06 m (13 ft 10 in) long, with a waterline length of 3.81 m (12 ft 6 in). The hull weight is 59 kg (130 lb). The boat is manufactured by ILCA and World Sailing approved builders.

Lasers are cat-rigged, meaning they have only one sail. The 4.7 uses the same hull and top mast section as the Laser, but has a different, shorter bottom mast section as well as a smaller sail. The bottom mast section is pre-bent which effectively reduces the power of the rig, and the sail is only 4.7 square meters, as opposed to 7 for the Laser Standard or 5.7 for the Laser Radial. (ILCA 6) The smaller sail means that the 4.7 can be easily sailed by sailors weighing only 50–65 kg (110–145 lb), though this boat can still be sailed competitively at all levels under and over the ideal weights.

== Description ==
The Laser 4.7 has been increasing in popularity around the world since the late 1990s. In some areas it is less popular than the Byte dinghy, a very similar class also designed as a youth single-handed racing trainer, but the interchangeability of the rigs of the Laser series has always made them popular. It is popular among youth sailors graduating from the Optimist sailing dinghy and also the Topper (dinghy), and many 4.7 sailors graduate to the Laser Radial (ILCA 6) as they progress their sailing abilitie and size. The Laser 4.7 is also sailed widely at a club level as the smaller rig suits the more inexperienced sailors.

== See also ==
- Laser (dinghy)
- Laser Radial
- Laser 4.7 World Championships
