= Andreas Kosmatopoulos =

Greek yacht racer

Andreas Kosmatopoulos (born 26 September 1968) is a Greek yacht racer who competed in the 1992 Summer Olympics, in the 1996 Summer Olympics, in the 2000 Summer Olympics, in the 2004 Summer Olympics, and in the 2008 Summer Olympics.

== Personal ==
Kosmatopoulos is married with Işın Şahinöz. He also married with Sofia Bekatorou and they have two children.
