= ILCA 4 World Championships =

The ILCA 4 Youth World Championships, until 2020 the Laser 4.7 Youth World Championships, have been held every year since 2002, organized by the host club on behalf of the International Class Association and recognised by World Sailing. The event is open to sailors under the age of 18.

== Editions ==
Event			Host			Sailor						Ref.
Ed.	Date	Year	Host club	City	Country	Age	Gender			Nat.	Cont.	Ref.
1	20-27 Jul	2002		Medemblik	Netherlands	U18	Open	98	29	16	3	
2	13-18 Jul	2003		Almere	Netherlands	U18	Open	80	18	18	3	
3	17Jul -24Jun	2004	Fraglia Vela Riva	Riva del Garda	Italy	U18	Open	228	52	26	6	
4	8-13 Aug	2005	Barrington Yacht Club	Barrington	United States	U18	Open	68	24	16	6	
5	30Jun -7Jul	2006	Club de Viole Houtin Medoc	Hourtin	France	U18	Male	237	-	30	5	
5	30Jun -7Jul	2006	Club de Viole Houtin Medoc	Hourtin	France	U18	Female	-	88	19	3	
6	27Dec -4Jan	2007/08	Hermanus Yacht Club	Hermanus	South Africa	U18	Open	90	25	26	6	
7	22-29 Aug	2008		Trogir	Croatia	U18	Male	279	-	41	6	
7	22-29 Aug	2008		Trogir	Croatia	U18	Female	-	116	29	5	
8	24-31 Jul	2009	Búzios Vela Clube	Armação dos Búzios	Brazil	U18	Male	110	-	24	6	
8	24-31 Jul	2009	Búzios Vela Clube	Armação dos Búzios	Brazil	U18	Female	-	39	23	5	
9	31Mar -8Apr	2010	Royal Varuna Yacht Club	Pattaya	Thailand	U18	Male	46	-	21	5	
9	31Mar -8Apr	2010	Royal Varuna Yacht Club	Pattaya	Thailand	U18	Female	-	39	19	5	
9	31Mar -8Apr	2010	Royal Varuna Yacht Club	Pattaya	Thailand	U16	Open	24	6	14	3	
10	26Jul -2Aug	2011	St. Francis Yacht Club	Berkeley and San Francisco	United States	U18	Male	110	-	28	5	
10	26Jul -2Aug	2011	St. Francis Yacht Club	Berkeley and San Francisco	United States	U18	Female	-	51	19	5	
11	31Mar -6Apr	2012	Yacht Club Argentino	Buenos Aires	Argentina	U18	Male	71	-	25	6	
11	31Mar -6Apr	2012	Yacht Club Argentino	Buenos Aires	Argentina	U18	Female	-	46	17	5	
12	6-13 Jul	2013	Balatonfüredi Yacht Club	Lake Balaton, Balatonfüred	Hungary	U18	Male	230	-	44	5	
12	6-13 Jul	2013	Balatonfüredi Yacht Club	Lake Balaton, Balatonfüred	Hungary	U18	Female	-	122	31	5	
13	8-15 Aug	2014		Karatsu	Japan	U18	Male	66	-	21	6	
13	8-15 Aug	2014		Karatsu	Japan	U18	Female	-	37	14	3	
14	6-22 Aug	2015		Medemblik	Netherlands	U18	Male	257	-	36	5	
14	6-22 Aug	2015		Medemblik	Netherlands	U18	Female	-	127	29	5	
15	30Jul -7Aug	2016	Kieler Yacht Club	Kiel	Germany	U18	Male	256	-	38	5	
15	30Jul -7Aug	2016	Kieler Yacht Club	Kiel	Germany	U18	Female	-	125	31	5	
16	16-24 Jul	2017	Koninklijke Yacht Club Nieuwpoort	Nieuwpoort	Belgium	U18	Male	234	-	43	5	
16	16-24 Jul	2017	Koninklijke Yacht Club Nieuwpoort	Nieuwpoort	Belgium	U18	Female	-	115	30	5	
17	9-17 Jul	2018		Gdynia	Poland	U18	Male	275	-	42	5	
17	9-17 Jul	2018		Gdynia	Poland	U18	Female	-	155	35	5	
18	16-23 Aug	2019	Canadian Olympic-training Regatta, Kingston	Portsmouth Olympic Harbour, Kingston	Canada	U18	Male	117	-	33	5	
18	16-23 Aug	2019	Canadian Olympic-training Regatta, Kingston	Portsmouth Olympic Harbour, Kingston	Canada	U18	Female	-	63	20	4	
N/A	26 Jul – 3 Aug	2020	Circolo Vela Arco	Lake Garda	Italy	Cancelled due to covid						
19	7-14 Aug	2021	Royal St George Yacht Club; Irish National Yacht Club	Dun Laoghaire	Ireland	U18	Male	150	-	26	4	
19	7-14 Aug	2021	Royal St George Yacht Club; Irish National Yacht Club	Dun Laoghaire	Ireland	U18	Female	-	81	20	5	
20	13-20 Aug	2022	Capable Planet Clube Náutico	Vilamoura	Portugal	U18	Male	271	-	41	5	
20	13-20 Aug	2022	Capable Planet Clube Náutico	Vilamoura	Portugal	U18	Female	-	154	36	5	
21	22-30 Jul	2023	Nautical Club of Volos & Argonauts	Volos	Greece	U18	Male	287	-	48	6	
21	22-30 Jul	2023	Nautical Club of Volos & Argonauts	Volos	Greece	U18	Female	-	150	40	5	
22	22-30 Jun	2024	Clube de Vela de Viana do Castelo & Capable Planet Clube Nautico	Viana do Castelo	Portugal	U18	Male	276	-			
22	22-30 Jun	2024	Clube de Vela de Viana do Castelo & Capable Planet Clube Nautico	Viana do Castelo	Portugal	U18	Female	-	150			
23	19–26 Jul	2025	Cabrillo Beach Yacht Club	San Pedro Bay	United States	U18	Male	140	-	31	5	
23	19–26 Jul	2025	Cabrillo Beach Yacht Club	San Pedro Bay	United States	U18	Female	-	100	33	5	
24	4–9 Aug	2026	Aarhus International Sailing Center	Aarhus	Denmark	U18	Male	298	-	46	4	
24	4–9 Aug	2026	Aarhus International Sailing Center	Aarhus	Denmark	U18	Female	-	150	46	4	

== Medalists ==
=== Open ===
Year	Gold	Silver	Bronze	1st
2002	Tonči Stipanović (CRO)	Daniel Mihelic (CRO)	Colin Robaard (NED)	Tugçe Subasi (TUR) / 14th
2003	Onur Derebasi (TUR)	Ateş Çınar (TUR)	Mustafa Çakır (TUR)	Ayda Ünver (TUR) / 13th
2004	Justin Onvlee (RSA)	Mathieu Frei (FRA)	Ivo Kalebic (CRO)	Anita di Iasio (ITA) / 5th
2005	Joaquín Blanco (ESP)	Adam Sims (GBR)	Dany Stanišić (SLO)	Stephanie Roble (USA) / 5th

=== Boys ===
Year	Gold	Silver	Bronze	Ref.
2006	Colin Cheng (SIN)	Viktor Serrezhkin (RUS)	Marko Pereša (CRO)	
2007	Filip Matika (CRO)	Baepi Pinna (BRA)	Alexander Zimmerman (PER)	
2008	Shahar Jacob (ISR)	Scott Sydney (SIN)	Lovre Perhat (CRO)	
2009	Jonathan Martinetti (ECU)	Hermann Tomasgaard (NOR)	Juraj Divjakinja (CRO)	
2010	Etienne Le Pen (FRA)	Supakorn Pongwichean (THA)	Jolbert van Dijk (NED)	
2011	Francisco González (ESP)	Carlos Roselló (ESP)	William De Smedt (BEL)	
2012	Benjamin Vadnai (HUN)	Nahuel Pérez (ESP)	Maximilian Kuester (ITA)	
2013	Anıl Çetin (TUR)	Jonatán Vadnai (HUN)	Conor Nicholas (AUS)	
2014	Alexandre Boite (FRA)	Ismael Less (ESP)	Federico Fornasari (ITA)	
2015	Alejandro Bethencourt (ESP)	Rafael de la Hoz (ESP)	Guido Gallinaro (ITA)	
2016	Dimitrios Papadimtriou (GRE)	Guido Gallinaro (ITA)	Pere Ponsetti (ESP)	
2017	Yılkan Timurşah (TUR)	Sofiane Karim (FRA)	Cesare Barabino (ITA)	
2018	Daniel Hung (SGP)	Michael Compton (AUS)	Stefano Viale (PER)	
2019	Niccolo Nordera (ITA)	Roko Stipanović (CRO)	Gašper Strahovnik (SLO)	
2020	Cancelled due to COVID-19			
2021	Mārtiņš Atilla (LAT)	Alexandros Eleftheriadis (GRE)	Massimiliano Antoniazzi (ITA)	
2022	Nicoló Cassitta (ITA)	Dionysios Kalpogiannakis (GRE)	Max Frank (NED)	
2023	Weka Bhanubandh (THA)	James Pine (USA)	Lorenzo Ghirotti (ITA)	
2024	Carlos Charabati (CAN)	Josip Tafra (CRO)	Ali Poyraz Özdemir (TUR)	
2025	Konstantinos Portosalte (GRE)	Erik Scheidt (BRA)	Sadrihan Süer (TUR)	
2026	Leo Gosling (SUI)	Stefanos Samaras (GRE)	Alexander Montagu (USA)	

=== Girls ===
Year	Gold	Silver	Bronze
2006	Victoria Chan (SIN)	Agnieszka Skrzypulec (POL)	Julie Chehab (FRA)
2007	Tatjana Ganić (CRO)	Ewa Makowska (POL)	Lina Stock (CRO)
2008	Elizabeth Yin (SIN)	Matea Senkić (CRO)	Ante Kordić (CRO)
2009	Urška Košir (SLO)	Tomoyo Wakabayashi (JPN)	Hitomi Murayama (JPN)
2010	Caitlin Elks (AUS)	Amirah Hamid Nur (MAS)	Jacob Oren (ISR)
2011	Cecilia Zorzi (ITA)	Kim Pletikos (SLO)	Line Flem Höst (NOR)
2012	Celine Therese Herud (NOR)	Yolanda González (ESP)	Anja Hamerlitz (CRO)
2013	Silvia Morales (ESP)	Magdalena Kwaśna (POL)	Sofia Capparuccini (ITA)
2014	Asya Luvisetto (SUI)	Irene Miras (ESP)	Francesca Bergamo (ITA)
2015	Kateryna Gumenko (UKR)	Julia Büsselberg (GER)	Isaura Maenhaut (BEL)
2016	Emma Savelon (NED)	Mariia Kislukhina (RUS)	Elisa Navoni (ITA)
2017	Federica Cattarozzi (ITA)	Giorgia Cingolani (ITA)	Anna Moncada (ESP)
2018	Chiara Benini (ITA)	Simone Chen (SGP)	Giorgia Cingolani (ITA)
2019	Anja Von Allmen (SUI)	Lara Himmes (ESP)	Sara Savelli (ITA)
2020	Cancelled due to COVID-19		
2021	Emma Mattivi (ITA)	Petra Marednic (CRO)	Gaia Bolzonella (ITA)
2022	Ginevra Caracciolo (ITA)	Alina Shapovalova (UKR)	Petra Marendic (CRO)
2023	Hermionie Ghicas (GRE)	Kleopatra Anastassiou (GRE)	Alina Shapovalova (UKR)
2024	Hieke Schraffordt (NED)	Féline van Ede (NED)	Katrina Micallef (MLT)
2025	Blanca Ferrando (ESP)	Isabella Suazo (PER)	Derin Bartan (TUR)
2026	Eleni Triantou (GRE)	Blanca Ferrando (ESP)	Despoina Theodorakopoulou (GRE)

== See also - Class Events ==
- ILCA Main Worlds
  - Men's ILCA 6 World Championship
  - Women's ILCA 6 World Championship
  - Open ILCA 7 World Championship No Longer Held
  - Male ILCA 7 World Championship
- ILCA Age Related Worlds
  - Male Under 18 ILCA 4 World Championships
  - Female Under 18 ILCA 4 World Championships
  - Open Youth ILCA 6 World Championships No Longer Held
  - Male Youth ILCA 6 World Championships
  - Female Youth ILCA 6 World Championships
  - Female Under 21 ILCA 6 World Championships
  - Male Under 21 ILCA 7 World Championships
  - Open Over 30,45,55,65,75 ILCA Masters World Championships
- None Class Worlds
  - Youth Sailing World Championships
  - World Sailing Inclusion Championships

== See also - World Sailing Events ==
- Sailing World Championships
- Youth Sailing World Championships
