= Vaavu Atoll =

Vaavu Atoll ފެލިދެ އަތޮޅު
- atoll of the Maldives
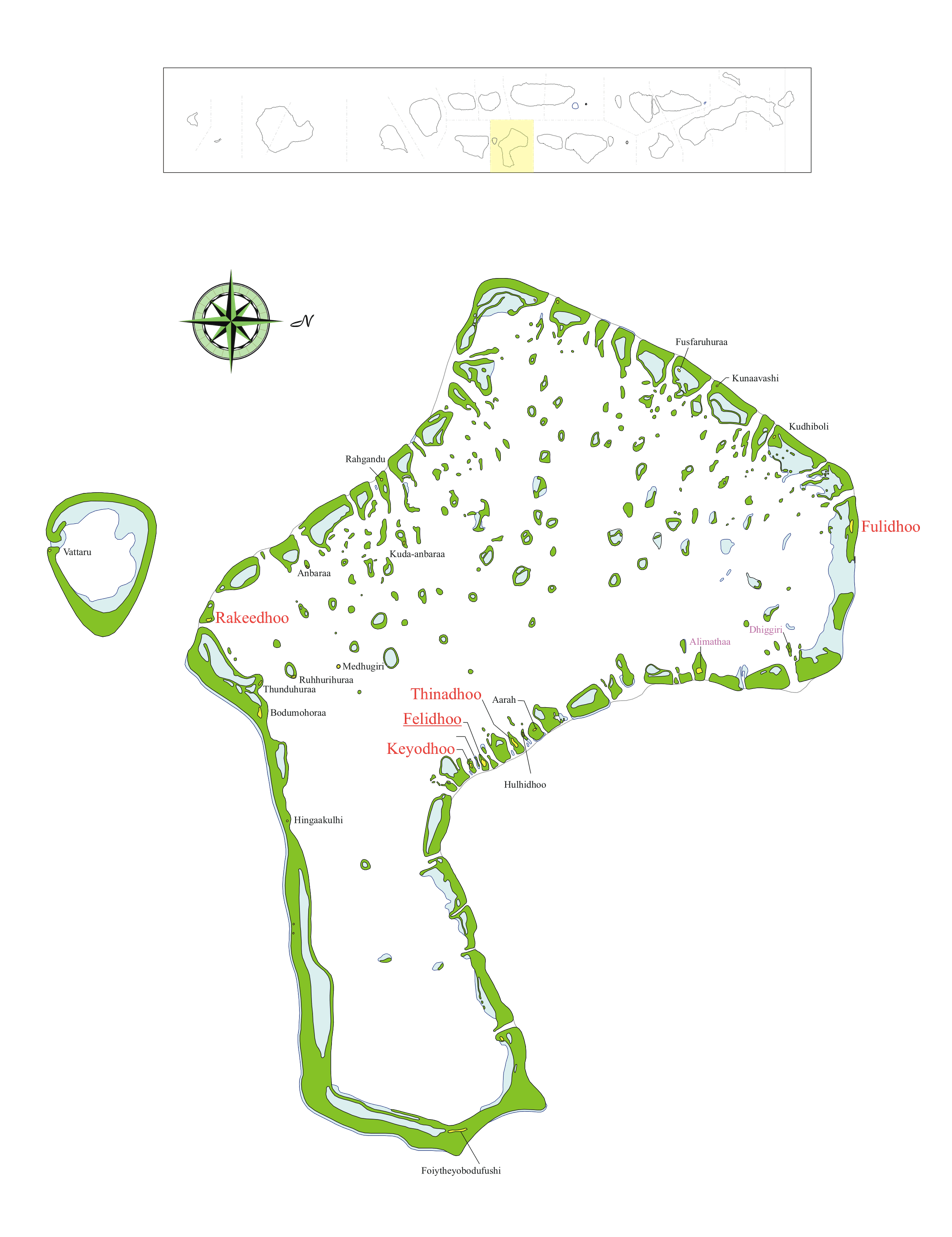

- Location of Vaavu in Maldives
- Country: Maldives
- Corresponding geographic atoll(s): Felidhu Atoll
- Location: 3° 41' N and 3° 13' N
- Capital: Felidhoo

Government
  - Atoll Chief: Ali Rasheed Abdul Rahman

Population
  - Total: 1,601
- Letter code: J
- Dhivehi letter code: V (ވ)
  - Number of islands: 19
  - Inhabited islands: Felidhoo * Fulidhoo * Keyodhoo * Rakeedhoo * Thinadhoo
  - Uninhabited islands: Aarah, Alimathaa, Anbaraa, Bodumohoraa, Dhiggiri, Fussfaruhuraa, Hingaahuraa, Hulhidhoo, Kuda-anbaraa, Kudhiboli, Kunavashi, Maafussaru, Medhugiri, Thunduhuraa, Raggadu, Ruhhurihuraa, Vashugiri, Vattaru, Fottheyo
- Resort islands(*), airports(¤) and industrial islands are also considered uninhabited.

The uninhabited island of Hulhidhoo as viewed from Thinadhoo

Vaavu Atoll (Dhivehi: ފެލިދެ އަތޮޅު) is an administrative division of the Maldives, comprising the natural atolls of Felidhu Atoll and the Vattaru Reef.

It is the smallest administrative atoll in the Maldives in terms of population.

This atoll is located 40 miles (64 km) from the capital Malé, 60 minutes by speedboat, and 3 hours by dhoni.

The Vaavu Atoll administrative division includes two geographical atolls.

1 - Felidhoo Atoll

The main atoll, where all islands except one are located. The atoll is shaped like a diamond (or a 45° square) which the reef of fottheyo stretching eastward

2 - Vattaru Atoll

The only atoll which is not inhabited, it contains only one island, Vattaru. Its geographical location coupled with the fact that it is uninhabited makes it a very isolated area that does not get many visitors.

Vaavu Atoll has the largest reef in Maldives, that is the reef of Foththeyo. This is thought to be the least visited island in the whole of Maldives being at the far eastern extremity and 17 mi (15 nmi; 27 km) from the nearest inhabited island of Keyodhoo.

The easternmost geographical point of the Maldives is located at Fottheyo Muli, close to Foththeyo-bodufushi Island.

No remains from the Buddhist period have been found on this atoll.

== Geography ==
=== Inhabited islands ===
Name	Population	Coordinates	Geographic Atoll	Remarks
Felidhoo	489	3°28′18″N 73°32′50″E	Felidhu Atoll	
Fulidhoo	324	3°40′49″N 73°24′57″E	Felidhu Atoll	
Keyodhoo	635	3°27′43″N 73°33′00″E	Felidhu Atoll	
Rakeedhoo	101	3°18′53″N 73°28′11″E	Felidhu Atoll	
Thinadhoo	73	3°29′15″N 73°32′17″E	Felidhu Atoll	

=== Resort islands ===
Resort islands are classified as Uninhabited Islands which have been converted to become resorts. As of 2017, Vaavu has two resorts with 434 beds. The following are the resort islands, with the official name of the resort.

Name	Resort Name	Coordinates	Geographic Atoll	Remarks
Alimathaa	Alimatha Aquatic Resort	3°35′37″N 73°29′52″E	Felidhu Atoll	
Dhiggiri	Dhiggiri Tourist Resort	3°38′42″N 73°29′14″E	Felidhu Atoll	

== Incidents ==
On 14 May 2026 five Italian citizens from the University of Genoa died while cave diving at a depth of 50 meters (164 feet). It was the worst diving accident in the Maldives' history. Maldivian military officer Sgt. Mohamed Mahudhee died during an attempted recovery of the bodies of the deceased. A Finnish team arrived to aid in their recovery on May 17, 2026. Their bodies were found the following day.

== Notes ==
Haa Alifu, Haa Dhaalu, Shaviyani, Noonu, Raa, Baa, Kaafu, etc. (including Vaavu) are code letters assigned to the present administrative divisions of the Maldives. They are not the proper names of the natural atolls that make up these divisions. Some atolls are divided into two administrative divisions while other divisions are made up of two or more natural atolls. The order followed by the code letters is from North to South, beginning with the first letters of the Thaana alphabet used in Dhivehi. These code letters are not accurate from the geographical and cultural point of view. However, they have become popular among tourists and foreigners in the Maldives who find them easier to pronounce than the true atoll names in Dhivehi, (save a few exceptions, like Ari Atoll).
