= List of National Sports Award recipients in non-Olympic sports =

National Sports Awards in non-Olympic sports
- Various civilian awards for contributions to Sports (Individual/Team)
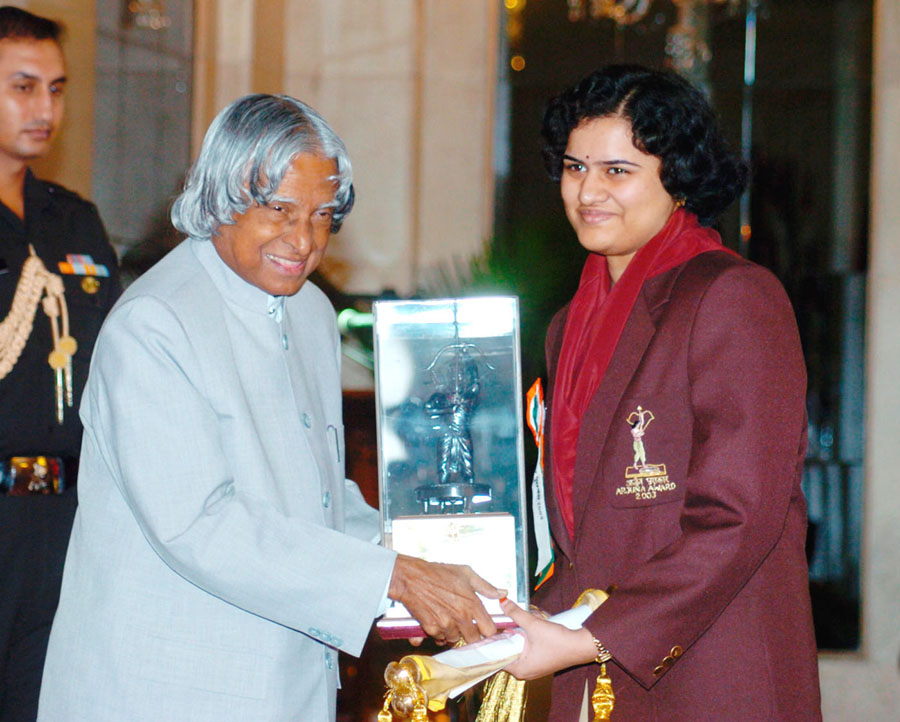
- Koneru Humpy receiving the Arjuna Award in 2003
- Awarded for: Various sports honour of India
- Sponsored by: Government of India
- Location: Rashtrapati Bhavan
- Country: Republic of India
- Presented by: President of India
- First award: 1961
- Final award: 2024

Highlights
- Total awarded: 266
- Awards: Arjuna Award; Dronacharya Award; Major Dhyan Chand Khel Ratna; Dhyan Chand Award

The National Sports Awards is the collective name given to the six sports awards of Republic of India. It is awarded annually by the Ministry of Youth Affairs and Sports. They are presented by the President of India in the same ceremony at the Rashtrapati Bhavan usually on 29 August each year along with the national adventure award. As of 2020, a total of two hundred and sixty-six individuals have been awarded the various National Sports Awards in non-Olympic sports. The four awards presented in non-Olympic sports are Major Dhyan Chand Khel Ratna, Arjuna Award, Dhyan Chand Award and Dronacharya Award.

First presented in the year 1961, a total of two hundred and twenty-nine individuals (including one group award to twenty individuals) have been honoured with the Arjuna Award in non-Olympic sports for their "good performance at the international level" over the period of last four years, with two individuals being awarded for their lifetime contribution. First presented in the year 1986, a total of twenty-five coaches have been honoured with the Dronacharya Award in non-Olympic sports for their "outstanding work on a consistent basis and enabling sportspersons to excel in international events" over the period of last four years, with four coaches being awarded in the lifetime contribution category. First presented in the year 1991–1992, a total of nine sportspersons have been honoured with the Rajiv Gandhi Khel Ratna, the highest sporting honour of India, in non-Olympic sports for their "most outstanding performance at the international level" over the period of last four years. First presented in the year 2005, a total of three retired sportspersons have been honoured with the Dhyan Chand Award, the lifetime achievement sporting honour of India, in non-Olympic sports for their "good performance at the international level and their continued contributions to the promotion of sports even after their career as a sportsperson is over." One awardee Kelly Subbanand Rao was honoured Arjuna Award posthumously in the year 1996 in the discipline of yachting.

== Recipients ==
=== Adventure Sports ===
List of National Sports award recipients, showing the year, award, and gender
Year	Recipient	Award	Gender
1985	Gulshan Rai	Arjuna Award	Male
1986	Arti Pradhan	Arjuna Award	Female
1986	K. S. Rao	Arjuna Award	male

=== Ball Badminton ===
List of National Sports award recipients, showing the year, award, and gender
Year	Recipient	Award	Gender
1970	J. Pitchayya	Arjuna Award	Male
1972	Jayamma Srinivasan	Arjuna Award	Female
1973	A. Kareem	Arjuna Award	Male
1975	L. A. Iqbal	Arjuna Award	Male
1976	A. Sam Christ Das	Arjuna Award	Male
1984	D. Rajaraman	Arjuna Award	Male

=== Billiards & Snooker ===
List of National Sports award recipients, showing the year, award, and gender
Year	Recipient	Award	Gender
1992–1993	Geet Sethi	Rajiv Gandhi Khel Ratna	Male
2005	Pankaj Advani	Rajiv Gandhi Khel Ratna	Male
1962	Wilson Jones	Arjuna Award	Male
1970	Michael Ferreira	Arjuna Award	Male
1972	Satish Kumar Mohan	Arjuna Award	Male
1973	Shyam Shroff	Arjuna Award	Male
1978–1979	Arvind Savur	Arjuna Award	Male
1983	Subhash Agarwal	Arjuna Award	Male
1984	Omprakesh Agrawal	Arjuna Award	Male
1985	Geet Sethi	Arjuna Award	Male
1989	Yasin Merchant	Arjuna Award	Male
1997	Ashok Harishankar Shandilya	Arjuna Award	Male
2001	Devender Sreekant Joshi	Arjuna Award	Male
2002	Alok Kumar	Arjuna Award	Male
2003	Pankaj Advani	Arjuna Award	Male
2005	Anuja Thakur	Arjuna Award	Female
2012	Aditya Mehta	Arjuna Award	Male
2013	Rupesh Shah	Arjuna Award	Male
2016	Sourav Kothari	Arjuna Award	Male
2005	Manoj Kumar Kothari	Dhyan Chand Award	Male
1996	Wilson Jones	Dronacharya Award	Male
2001	Michael Ferreira	Dronacharya Award	Male
2004	Arvind Savur	Dronacharya Award	Male
2010	Subhash Agarwal	Dronacharya Award	Male

=== Bodybuilding ===
List of National Sports award recipients, showing the year, award, and gender
Year	Recipient	Award	Gender
1978–1979	Monotosh Roy	Arjuna Award	Male
1979–1980	Sunil Kumar Patra	Arjuna Award	Male
1986	Premchand Degra	Arjuna Award	Male
1998	T. V. Pauly	Arjuna Award	Male
2019	S. Bhaskaran	Arjuna Award	Male

=== Carrom ===
List of National Sports award recipients, showing the year, award, and gender
Year	Recipient	Award	Gender
1996	A. Maria Irudayam	Arjuna Award	Male

=== Chess ===
List of National Sports award recipients, showing the year, award, and gender
Year	Recipient	Award	Gender
1991–1992	Viswanathan Anand	Rajiv Gandhi Khel Ratna	Male
2024	Gukesh Dommaraju	Major Dhyan Chand Khel Ratna	Male
1961	Manuel Aaron	Arjuna Award	Male
1980–1981	Rohini Khadilkar	Arjuna Award	Female
1983	Dibyendu Barua	Arjuna Award	Male
1984	Pravin Thipsay	Arjuna Award	Male
1985	Viswanathan Anand	Arjuna Award	Male
1987	Devaki Prasad	Arjuna Award	Male
1987	Bhagyashree Thipsay	Arjuna Award	Female
1990	Anupama Gokhale	Arjuna Award	Female
2000	Subbaraman Vijayalakshmi	Arjuna Award	Female
2002	Krishnan Sasikiran	Arjuna Award	Male
2003	Koneru Humpy	Arjuna Award	Female
2005	Surya Shekhar Ganguly	Arjuna Award	Male
2006	Pentala Harikrishna	Arjuna Award	Male
2007	Harika Dronavalli	Arjuna Award	Female
2009	Tania Sachdev	Arjuna Award	Female
2010	Parimarjan Negi	Arjuna Award	Male
2013	Abhijeet Gupta	Arjuna Award	Male
2022	Bhakti Kulkarni	Arjuna Award	Female
2022	R Praggnanandhaa	Arjuna Award	Male
2023	R Vaishali	Arjuna Award	Female
2024	Vantika Agrawal	Arjuna Award	Female
2026	Divya Deshmukh	Arjuna Award	Female
2026	Vidit Gujrathi	Arjuna Award	Male
2021	Abhijit Kunte	Dhyan Chand Award	Male
2006	Koneru Ashok	Dronacharya Award	Male
2023	RB Ramesh	Dronacharya Award	Male

=== Kabaddi ===
Key
+ Indicates a Lifetime contribution honour

List of National Sports award recipients, showing the year, award, and gender
Year	Recipient	Award	Gender
1972	S. M. Shetty	Arjuna Award	Male
1973	Bhola Nath Guin	Arjuna Award	Male
1978–1979	S. P. Khatavkar	Arjuna Award	Female
1980–1981	Shantaram Jadhav	Arjuna Award	Male
1981	Monika Nath	Arjuna Award	Female
1983	Maya Kashinath	Arjuna Award	Female
1986	Rama Sarkar	Arjuna Award	Female
1990	Hardeep Singh	Arjuna Award	Male
1994	Subbiah Rajaratnam	Arjuna Award	Male
1994	Ashok D. Shinde	Arjuna Award	Male
1995	P. Ganesan	Arjuna Award	Male
1996	Shriram Bhavsar	Arjuna Award	Male
1996	Neta Moreshwar Dadwe	Arjuna Award	Female
1997	Randhir Singh	Arjuna Award	Male
1998	Ashan Kumar	Arjuna Award	Male
1998	Biswajit Palit	Arjuna Award	Male
1999	Tirath Raj ^{+}	Arjuna Award	Male
1999	Balwinder Singh ^{+}	Arjuna Award	Male
2000	C. Honappa	Arjuna Award	Male
2001	B. C. Ramesh	Arjuna Award	Male
2002	Ram Mehar Singh	Arjuna Award	Male
2003	Sanjeev Kumar	Arjuna Award	Male
2004	Sunder Singh	Arjuna Award	Male
2005	Ramesh Kumar	Arjuna Award	Male
2006	Navneet Gautam	Arjuna Award	Male
2009	Pankaj Navnath Shirsat	Arjuna Award	Male
2010	Dinesh Kumar	Arjuna Award	Male
2011	Rakesh Kumar	Arjuna Award	Male
2011	Tejaswini Bai V.	Arjuna Award	Female
2012	Anup Kumar	Arjuna Award	Male
2014	Mamatha Poojary	Arjuna Award	Female
2015	Manjeet Chhillar	Arjuna Award	Male
2015	Abhilasha Mhatre	Arjuna Award	Female
2017	Jasvir Singh	Arjuna Award	Male
2019	Ajay Thakur	Arjuna Award	Male
2020	Deepak Niwas Hooda	Arjuna Award	Male
2021	Sandeep Narwal	Arjuna Award	Male
2022	Sakshi Kumari	Arjuna Award	Female
2023	Pawan Sehrawat	Arjuna Award	Male
2023	Ritu Negi	Arjuna Award	Female
2007	Shamsher Singh	Dhyan Chand Award	Male
2020	Manpreet Singh	Dhyan Chand Award	Male
2021	Vikas Kumar	Dhyan Chand Award	Male
2022	B.C. Suresh	Dhyan Chand Award	Male
2023	Kavitha Selvaraj	Dhyan Chand Award	Female
2019	Rambir Singh Khokar ^{+}	Dronacharya Award	Male
2020	Krishan Kumar Hooda ^{+}	Dronacharya Award	Male
2021	Ashan Kumar ^{+}	Dronacharya Award	Male
2023	Bhaskaran E ^{+}	Dronacharya Award	Male
2002	E. Prasad Rao	Dronacharya Award	Male
2005	Balwan Singh	Dronacharya Award	Male
2012	Sunil Dabas	Dronacharya Award	Female
2017	Heera Nand Kataria	Dronacharya Award	Male

=== Kho Kho ===
List of National Sports award recipients, showing the year, award, and gender
Year	Recipient	Award	Gender
1970	Sudhir B. Parab	Arjuna Award	Male
1971	Achala Suberao Devra	Arjuna Award	Male
1973	Bhavna H. Parikh	Arjuna Award	Female
1974	N. C. Sarolkar	Arjuna Award	Female
1975	Shreerang J. Inamdar	Arjuna Award	Male
1975	Usha Vasant Nagarkar	Arjuna Award	Female
1976	S. R. Dharwadkar	Arjuna Award	Male
1981	Sushma Sarolkar	Arjuna Award	Female
1981	H. M. Takalkar	Arjuna Award	Male
1983	Veena Narayan Parab	Arjuna Award	Female
1984	S. Prakash	Arjuna Award	Male
1985	S. B. Kulkarni	Arjuna Award	Female
1998	Shobha Narayan	Arjuna Award	Female
2020	Kale Sarika Sudhakar	Arjuna Award	Female
2023	Nasreen Shaikh	Arjuna Award	Female
2000	Gopal Purushottam Phadke	Dronacharya Award	Male

=== Lawn Bowls ===
List of National Sports award recipients, showing the year, award, and gender
Year	Recipient	Award	Gender
2022	Nayanmoni Saikia	Arjuna Award	Female
2023	Pinki Singh	Arjuna Award	Female

=== Mallakhamb ===
List of National Sports award recipients, showing the year, award, and gender
Year	Recipient	Award	Gender
2021	Himani Parab	Arjuna Award	Female
2022	Sagar Kailas Ovhalkar	Arjuna Award	Male
2020	Yogesh Malviya	Dronacharya Award	Male
2023	Ganesh Prabhakar Devrukhkar	Dronacharya Award	Male

=== Motor Sports ===
List of National Sports award recipients, showing the year, award, and gender
Year	Recipient	Award	Gender
2019	Gaurav Gill	Arjuna Award	Male

=== Mountaineering ===
List of National Sports award recipients, showing the year, award, and gender
Year	Recipient	Award	Gender
1965	H. P. S. Ahluwalia	Arjuna Award (Group)	Male
1965	Harsh Vardhan Bahuguna	Arjuna Award (Group)	Male
1965	C. Balakrishanan	Arjuna Award (Group)	Male
1965	G. S. Bhangu	Arjuna Award (Group)	Male
1965	A. K. Chakravarty	Arjuna Award (Group)	Male
1965	Avtar Singh Cheema	Arjuna Award (Group)	Male
1965	Nawang Gombu	Arjuna Award (Group)	Male
1965	Sonam Gyatso	Arjuna Award (Group)	Male
1965	J. C. Joshi	Arjuna Award (Group)	Male
1965	Ang Kami	Arjuna Award (Group)	Male
1965	Mohan Singh Kohli	Arjuna Award (Group)	Male
1965	Narendra Kumar	Arjuna Award (Group)	Male
1965	Mulkh Raj	Arjuna Award (Group)	Male
1965	B. N. Rana	Arjuna Award (Group)	Male
1965	Harish Chandra Singh Rawat	Arjuna Award (Group)	Male
1965	B. P. Singh	Arjuna Award (Group)	Male
1965	Gurdial Singh	Arjuna Award (Group)	Male
1965	D. V. Telang	Arjuna Award (Group)	Male
1965	Chandra Prakash Vohra	Arjuna Award (Group)	Male
1965	Sonam Wangyal	Arjuna Award (Group)	Male
1981	Chandraprabha Aitwal	Arjuna Award	Female
1981	Harshwanti Bisht	Arjuna Award	Female
1981	B. S. Sandhu	Arjuna Award	Male
1981	Rekha Sharma	Arjuna Award	Female
1984	D. K. Khullar	Arjuna Award	Male
1984	Bachendri Pal	Arjuna Award	Female
1985	Phu Dorjee	Arjuna Award	Male

=== Polo ===
List of National Sports award recipients, showing the year, award, and gender
Year	Recipient	Award	Gender
1961	Prem Singh	Arjuna Award	Male
1963	Kishen Singh	Arjuna Award	Male
1964	Hanut Singh	Arjuna Award	Male
1975	V. P. Singh (Brigadier)	Arjuna Award	Male
1983	R. S. Sodhi	Arjuna Award	Male
1987	Kuldeep Singh Garcha	Arjuna Award	Male
2012	Samir Suhag	Arjuna Award	Male
2018	Ravi Rathore	Arjuna Award	Male
2019	Simran Singh Shergill	Arjuna Award	Male

=== Powerlifting ===
List of National Sports award recipients, showing the year, award, and gender
Year	Recipient	Award	Gender
1978–1979	Shubrata Dutta	Arjuna Award	Male
1984	P. J. Joseph	Arjuna Award	Male
1988	P. K. Yeshodhra	Arjuna Award	Male
1992	E. S. Bhaskaran	Arjuna Award	Male
2000	Bhupender Dhawan	Dronacharya Award	Male

=== Roller Skating ===
List of National Sports award recipients, showing the year, award, and gender
Year	Recipient	Award	Gender
1987	Naman Virendra Parekh	Arjuna Award	Male
2015	Anup Kumar Yama	Arjuna Award	Male

=== Wushu ===
List of National Sports award recipients, showing the year, award, and gender
Year	Recipient	Award	Gender
2011	W. Sandhyarani Devi	Arjuna Award	Female
2012	M. Bimoljit Singh	Arjuna Award	Male
2015	Y. Sanathoi Devi	Arjuna Award	Female
2018	Pooja Kadian	Arjuna Award	Female
2022	Praveen Kumar	Arjuna Award	Male
2023	Naorem Roshibina Devi	Arjuna Award	Female
2020	Kuldeep Handoo	Dronacharya Award	Male

=== Yachting ===
Key
# Indicates a posthumous honour

List of National Sports award recipients, showing the year, award, and gender
Year	Recipient	Award	Gender
1993–1994	Pushpendra Kumar Garg	Rajiv Gandhi Khel Ratna	Male
1993–1994	Homi Motivala	Rajiv Gandhi Khel Ratna	Male
1970	S. J. Contractor	Arjuna Award	Male
1973	Afsar Hussain	Arjuna Award	Male
1978–1979	S. K. Mongia	Arjuna Award	Male
1981	Zarir Karanjia	Arjuna Award	Male
1982	Farokh Tarapore	Arjuna Award	Male
1982	Fali Unwalla	Arjuna Award	Male
1982	Jeeje Unwalla	Arjuna Award	Male
1986	Dhruv Bhandari	Arjuna Award	Male
1987	C. S. Pradipak	Arjuna Award	Male
1990	Pushpendra Kumar Garg	Arjuna Award	Male
1993	Homi Motivala	Arjuna Award	Male
1996	Kelly Subbanand Rao^{#}	Arjuna Award	Male
1999	Aashim Mongia	Arjuna Award	Male
2001	Mahesh Ramchandran	Arjuna Award	Male
2002	Nitin Mongia	Arjuna Award	Male
2009	Girdhari Lal Yadav	Arjuna Award	Male
2010	Rajesh Chaudhary	Arjuna Award	Male
2002	Homi Motivala	Dronacharya Award	Male
