= National Sports Awards =

Indian sports awards

National Sports Award
- Various civilian awards for contributions to Sports (Individual/Team)
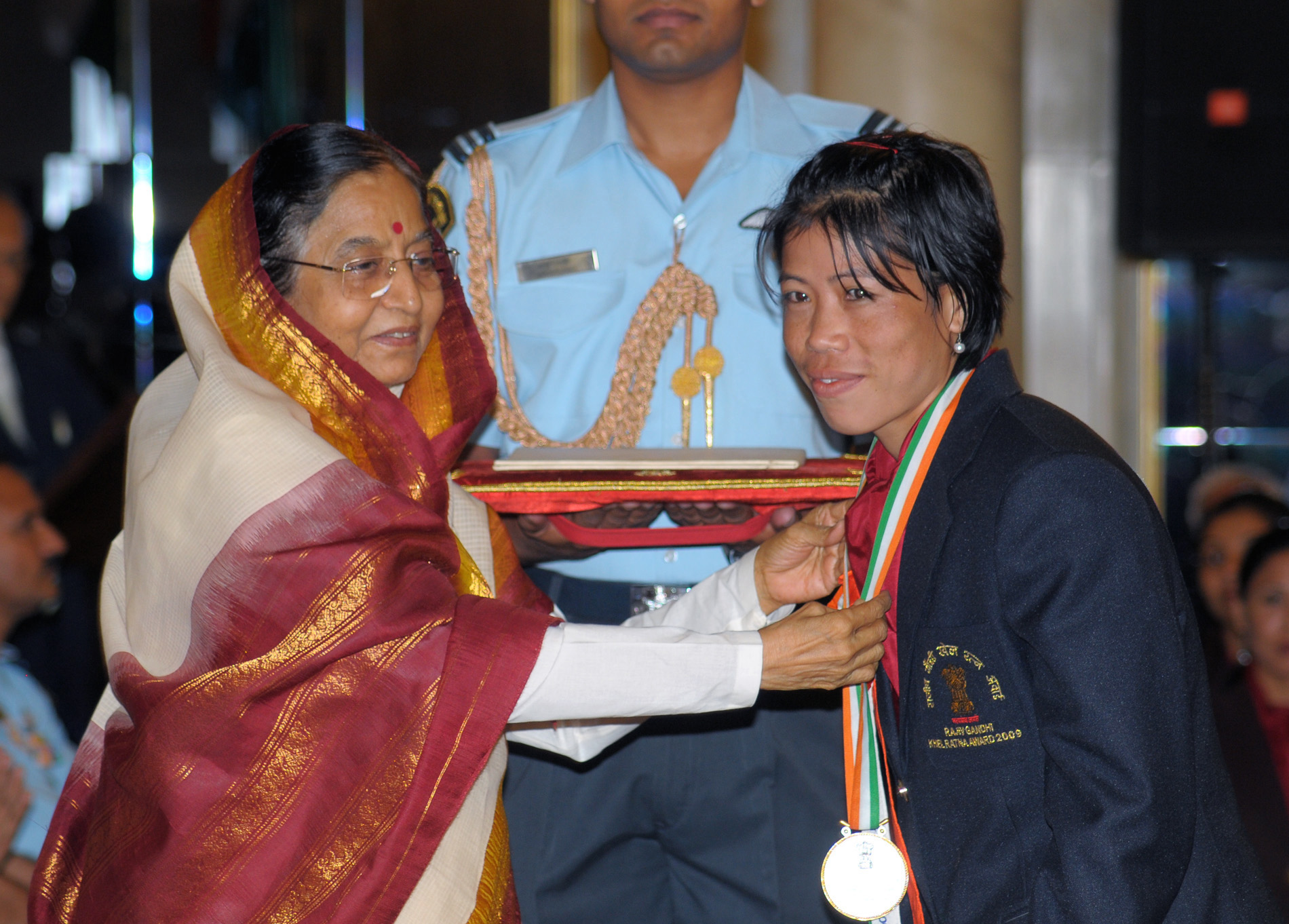
- Mary Kom receives the 2009 Major Dhyan Chand Khel Ratna for Boxing
- Awarded for: Various sports honour of India
- Sponsored by: Government of India
- Location: Presidential Palace
- Country: Republic of India
- Presented by: President of India
- First award: 1956–57
- Final award: 2022

Highlights
- Total awarded: 1259
- Awards: MAKA Trophy; Arjuna Award; Dronacharya Award; Major Dhyan Chand Khel Ratna; Dhyan Chand Award; Protsahan Puruskar

The National Sports Awards is the collective name given to the six sports awards of the Republic of India. It is awarded annually by the Ministry of Youth Affairs and Sports. They are presented by the President of India in the same ceremony at the Rashtrapati Bhavan, usually on 29 August. Since 2004, Tenzing Norgay National Adventure Award is also given alongside the other sports awards. As of 2020, a total of 1,259 individuals and organizations have been awarded the various National Sports Awards.

== List of awards ==
=== Maulana Abul Kalam Azad Trophy ===
Maulana Abdul Kalam Azad Trophy was instituted in the year 1956–1957. It is given to the university for "top performance in the inter-university tournaments" over the period of the last one year.

=== Arjuna Award ===
Arjuna Award was instituted in the year 1961. It is given to sportspersons for "consistent outstanding performance" over the period of last four years. The award comprises "a bronze statuette of Arjuna, certificate, ceremonial dress, and a cash prize of ₹15 lakh (US$16,000)." (Note: The cash prize was introduced in the year 1977–1978 as a scholarship of ₹200 (US$2.10) a month for 2 years. It was revised to one time cash prize of ₹5,000 (US$53) in 1986, to ₹20,000 (US$210) in 1987, to ₹50,000 (US$530) in 1993, to ₹1.5 lakh (US$1,600) in 1998, to ₹3 lakh (US$3,200) in 2001, to ₹5 lakh (US$5,300) in 2009, and to ₹15 lakh (US$16,000) in 2020.)

=== Dronacharya Award ===
Dronacharya Award instituted in the year 1985, it is given to coaches for "producing medal winners at prestigious international events". The award comprises "a bronze statuette of Dronacharya, a certificate, ceremonial dress, and a cash prize of ₹15 lakh (US$16,000)". (Note: The cash prize was revised from ₹5 lakh (US$5,300) to ₹25 lakh (US$27,000) in 2020.)

=== Major Dhyan Chand Khel Ratna ===
Major Dhyan Chand Khel Ratna was instituted in the year 1991–1992. It is given to sportspersons for "most outstanding performance by a sportsperson" over the period of last four years. The award comprises "a medallion, a certificate, and a cash prize of ₹25 lakh (US$27,000)". (Note: The cash prize was revised from ₹1 lakh (US$1,100) to ₹3 lakh (US$3,200) in 2000, to ₹5 lakh (US$5,300) in 2002, to ₹7.5 lakh (US$8,000) in 2009, and to ₹25 lakh (US$27,000) in 2020.)

=== Dhyan Chand Award ===
Dhyan Chand Award was instituted in the year 2002. It is given to individuals for "lifetime contribution to sports development". The award comprises "a Dhyan Chand statuette, a certificate, ceremonial dress, and a cash prize of ₹10 lakh (US$11,000)". (Note: The cash prize was revised from ₹3 lakh (US$3,200) to ₹5 lakh (US$5,300) in 2009, and to ₹10 lakh (US$11,000) in 2020.)

=== Rashtriya Khel Protsahan Puruskar ===
Rashtriya Khel Protsahan Puruskar was instituted in the year 2009. It is given to organizations (both private and public) and individuals for "playing a visible role in the area of sports promotion and development" over the period of last three years.

== Recipients ==
As of 2020, a total of 1,259 sportspersons, coaches, universities and organizations have been awarded the various National Sports Awards. Forty-three sportspersons have been awarded the Major Dhyan Chand Khel Ratna award [Formerly known as Rajiv Gandhi Khel Ratna Award ]

. The Arjuna Award has been awarded to 881 individuals and one group award to 20 mountaineers. Seventy-five sportspersons have been awarded the Dhyan Chand Award. One hundred and twenty-nine coaches have been awarded the Dronacharya Award, out of which 35 been awarded in the lifetime category. A total of six universities have been awarded the Maulana Abul Kalam Azad Trophy 64 times. Thirty-nine organizations and individuals have been awarded the Rashtriya Khel Protsahan Puruskar for sports promotion 47 times.

== Lists of recipients ==
=== By year ===
- Arjuna Award recipients (1961–1969)
- Arjuna Award recipients (1970–1979)
- Arjuna Award recipients (1980–1989
- Arjuna Award recipients (1990–1999)
- Arjuna Award recipients (2000–2009)
- Arjuna Award recipients (2010–2019)
- Arjuna Award recipients (2020–2029)
- Dhyan Chand Award recipients
- Dronacharya Award recipients
- Maulana Abul Kalam Azad Trophy recipients
- Major Dhyan Chand Khel Ratna recipients
- Rashtriya Khel Protsahan Puruskar recipients

=== By sport ===
==== Olympic sports ====
- Archery
- Athletics
- Aquatics
- Badminton
- Basketball
- Boxing
- Cricket
- Cycling
- Equestrian
- Football
- Golf
- Gymnastics
- Hockey
- Judo
- Lawn Tennis
- Rowing
- Shooting
- Squash
- Table Tennis
- Volleyball
- Weightlifting
- Winter Sports
- Wrestling

==== Non-Olympic sports ====
- Adventure Sports
- Ball Badminton
- Billiards & Snooker
- Bodybuilding
- Carrom
- Chess
- Kabaddi
- Kho Kho
- Mallakhamb
- Motor Sports
- Mountaineering
- Polo
- Powerlifting
- Roller Skating
- Wushu
- Yachting

==== Parasports ====
- Parasports
