= List of Arjuna Award recipients (1990–1999) =

List of recipients of a sports honor in India

Arjuna Award
- Civilian award for outstanding individual achievements in National Sports
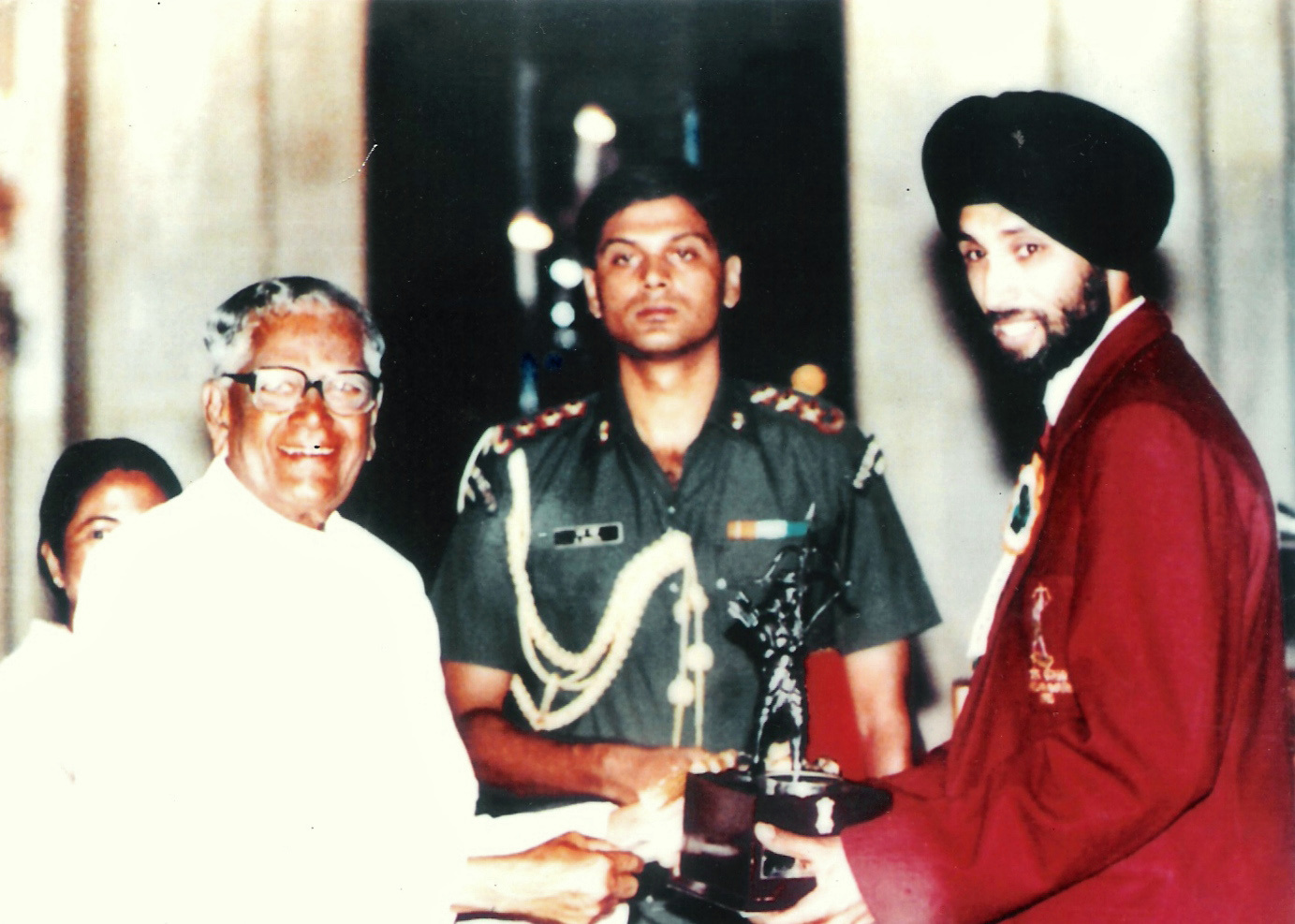
- Sponsored by: Government of India
- Established: 1961
- First award: 1961

Highlights
- Total awarded: 147

The Arjuna Award, officially known as the Arjuna Awards for Outstanding Performance in Sports and Games, is the sports honour of the Republic of India.It is awarded annually by the Ministry of Youth Affairs and Sports. Before the introduction of the Rajiv Gandhi Khel Ratna in 1991–1992, the Arjuna award was the highest sporting honour of India. As of 2020, the award comprises "a bronze statuette of Arjuna, certificate, ceremonial dress, and a cash prize of ₹15 lakh (US$16,000)." (Note: The cash prize was introduced in the year 1977–1978 as a scholarship of ₹200 (US$2.10) a month for 2 years. It was revised to one time cash prize of ₹5,000 (US$53) in 1986, to ₹20,000 (US$210) in 1987, to ₹50,000 (US$530) in 1993, to ₹1.5 lakh (US$1,600) in 1998, to ₹3 lakh (US$3,200) in 2001, to ₹5 lakh (US$5,300) in 2009, and to ₹15 lakh (US$16,000) in 2020.)

== Name ==
The award is named after Arjuna, a character from the Sanskrit epic Mahabharata of ancient India. He is one of the Pandavas, depicted as a skilled archer winning the hand of Draupadi in marriage and in the Kurukshetra War, Lord Krishna becomes his charioteer teaching him the sacred knowledge of Gita. In Hindu mythology, he has been seen as a symbol of hard work, dedication and concentration.

== History ==
Instituted in 1961 to honour the outstanding sportspersons of the country, the award over the years has undergone a number of expansions, reviews, and rationalizations. The award was expanded to include all the recognised disciplines in 1977, has introduced indigenous games and physically handicapped categories in 1995 and introduced a lifetime contribution category in 1995 leading to creation of a separate Dhyan Chand Award in 2002. The latest revision in 2018 stipulates that the award is given only to the disciplines included in the events like Olympic Games, Paralympic Games, Asian Games, Commonwealth Games, World Championship and World Cup along with Cricket, Indigenous Games, and Parasports. It also recommends giving only fifteen awards in a year, relaxing in case of excellent performance in major multi-sport events, team sports, across gender and giving away of at least one award to physically challenged category.

The nominations for the award are received from all government-recognised National Sports Federations, the Indian Olympic Association, the Sports Authority of India (SAI), the Sports Promotion and Control Boards, the state and the union territory governments and the Rajiv Gandhi Khel Ratna, Arjuna, Dhyan Chand and Dronacharya awardees of the previous years. The recipients are selected by a committee constituted by the Ministry and are honoured for their "good performance in the field of sports over a period of four years" at international level and for having shown "qualities of leadership, sportsmanship and a sense of discipline".

== Recipients ==
A total of 147 awards were presented in the 1990s – thirteen in 1990, followed by eight in 1991, seven in 1992, ten in 1993, eight in 1994, nine in 1995, eighteen in 1996, twenty-one in 1997, thirty in 1998 and twenty-three in 1999. Individuals from twenty-nine different sports were awarded, which includes twenty-one from hockey, twenty from athletics, eleven from kabaddi, nine each from boxing, cricket, shooting and weightlifting, eight from wrestling, four each from badminton, golf, judo, lawn tennis, rowing, swimming and yachting, three each from table tennis and volleyball, two each from archery, football and squash, and one each from basketball, billiards & snooker, bodybuilding, carrom, chess, equestrian, gymnastics, kho kho and powerlifting.

Amongst the notable winners was Leander Paes (awarded in 1990), considered one of the greatest doubles players in tennis history. He won eight Grand Slam doubles titles and ten Grand Slam mixed doubles titles. He also won the bronze medal in men's single tennis at 1996 Atlanta Olympic Games, being the first Indian individual medal winner at Olympics since 1952. Cricket legend Sachin Tendulkar (awarded in 1994), considered one of the greatest batsmen of all time according to the Encyclopedia Britannica, was the first cricketer to score 100 centuries in international competition. He is also the highest run scorer of all time in International cricket and the first sportsperson to be awarded the Bharat Ratna, India's highest civilian award in 2014. Dhanraj Pillay (awarded in 1995), was a field hockey player and the captain of the India national team. He is regarded as one of best Indian players of all times, having made three hundred and thirty-nine appearances for the national team and having scored a hundred and seventy goals. Another cricketer Rahul Dravid (awarded in 1998), nicknamed The Wall for "the sense of permanence to be found in his batting", is the fourth highest run-scorer in Test cricket and is considered one of the greatest batsmen of all time.

== List of recipients ==
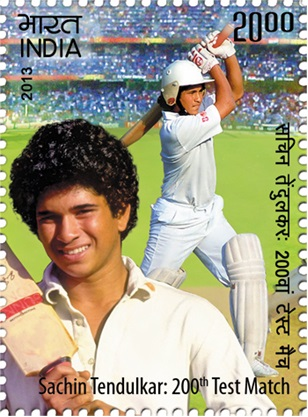
Indian stamp honoring Sachin Tendulkar

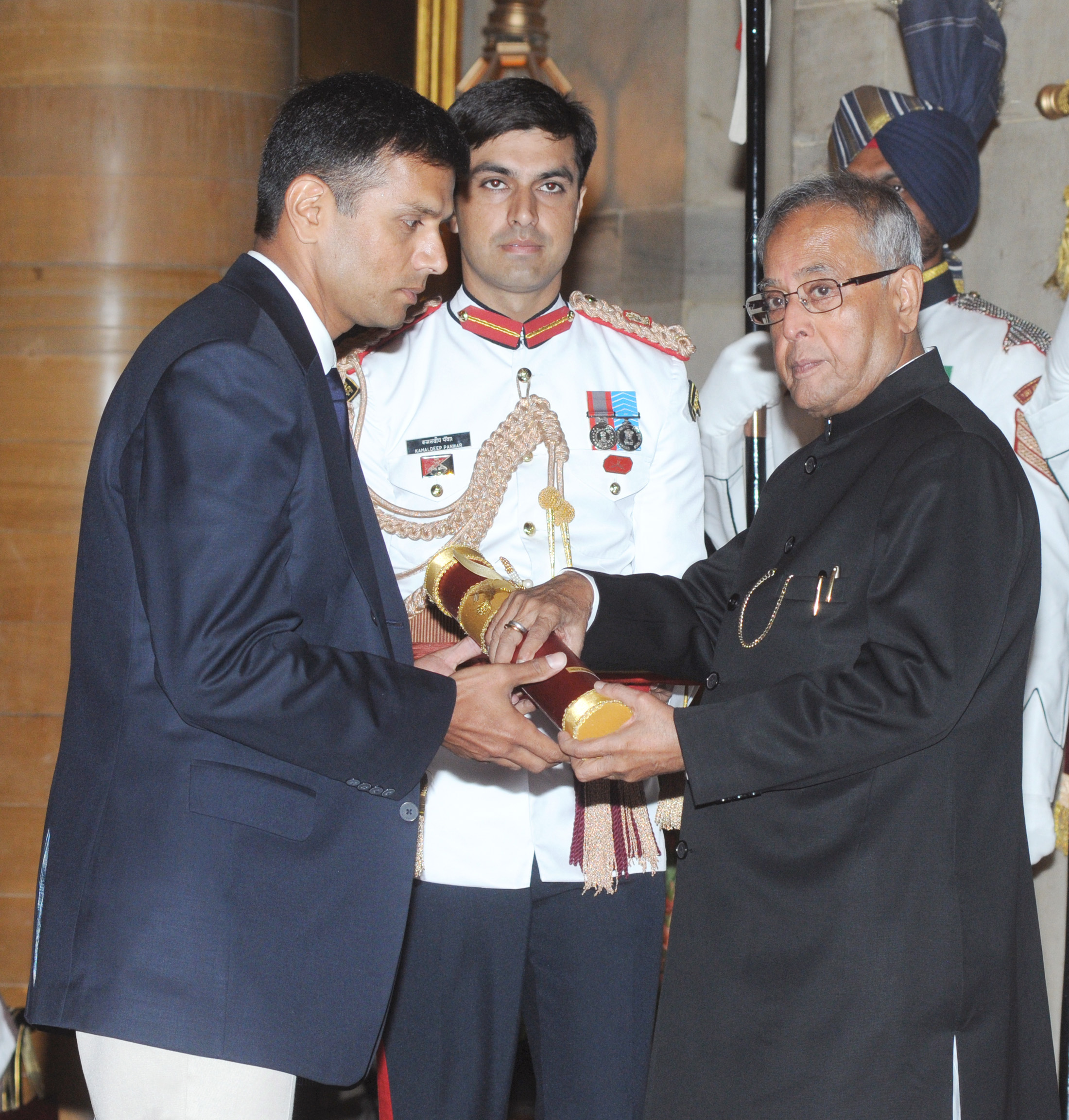
Rahul Dravid

Award recipients by year
Year	Number of recipients
1990	13
1991	8
1992	7
1993	10
1994	8
1995	9
1996	18
1997	21
1998	30
1999	23

Award recipients by sport
Sport	Number of recipients
Archery	2
Athletics	20
Badminton	4
Basketball	1
Billiards & Snooker	1
Bodybuilding	1
Boxing	9
Carrom	1
Chess	1
Cricket	9
Equestrian	1
Football	2
Golf	4
Gymnastics	1
Hockey	21
Judo	4
Kabaddi	11
Kho Kho	1
Lawn Tennis	4
Powerlifting	1
Rowing	4
Shooting	9
Squash	2
Swimming	4
Table Tennis	3
Volleyball	3
Weightlifting	9
Wrestling	8
Yachting	4

Key
§ Indicates Para sports	+ Indicates a Lifetime contribution honour	# Indicates a posthumous honour

List of Arjuna award recipients, showing the year, sport, and gender
Year	Recipient	Sport	Gender
1990	R. Chandra	Weightlifting	Male
1990	Bula Choudhury	Swimming	Female
1990	Kunjarani Devi	Weightlifting	Female
1990	M. R. Dharuvala	Squash	Male
1990	Pushpendra Kumar Garg	Yachting	Male
1990	Anupama Gokhale	Chess	Female
1990	Leander Paes	Lawn Tennis	Male
1990	Deena Ram	Athletics	Male
1990	Dalel Singh Ror	Volleyball	Male
1990	Hardeep Singh	Kabaddi	Male
1990	Jagbir Singh	Hockey	Male
1990	Ombir Singh	Wrestling	Male
1990	M. S. Walia	Table Tennis	Male
1991	Chhaya Adak	Weightlifting	Female
1991	Rajeev Bagga	Badminton§	Male
1991	Limba Ram	Archery	Male
1991	Ali Sher	Golf	Male
1991	Adhiraj Singh	Equestrian	Male
1991	Dalvir Singh	Rowing	Male
1991	K. Udayakumar	Volleyball	Male
1991	Dharmendra Singh Yadav	Boxing	Male
1992	E. S. Bhaskaran	Powerlifting	Male
1992	Sandeep Byala	Judo	Male
1992	Mervyn Fernandis	Hockey	Male
1992	Bahadur Prasad	Athletics	Male
1992	Rajendra Prasad	Boxing	Male
1992	Sanjeeva Kumar Singh	Archery	Male
1992	Pappu Yadav	Wrestling	Male
1993	Cawas Billimoria	Judo	Male
1993	Ashok Kumar Garg	Wrestling	Male
1993	Mukund Killekar	Boxing	Male
1993	Kiran More	Cricket	Male
1993	Homi Motivala	Yachting	Male
1993	Manoj Pingale	Boxing	Male
1993	Manoj Prabhakar	Cricket	Male
1993	K. Saramma	Athletics	Female
1993	Bharati Singh	Weightlifting	Female
1993	Mansher Singh	Shooting	Male
1994	R. S. Bhanwala	Rowing	Male
1994	Rosa Kutty	Athletics	Female
1994	Karnam Malleswari	Weightlifting	Female
1994	Subbiah Rajaratnam	Kabaddi	Male
1994	Jaspal Rana	Shooting	Male
1994	Jude Felix Sabastian	Hockey	Male
1994	Ashok D. Shinde	Kabaddi	Male
1994	Sachin Tendulkar	Cricket	Male
1995	Mahesh Bhupathi	Lawn Tennis	Male
1995	Venkatesan Devarajan	Boxing	Male
1995	P. Ganesan	Kabaddi	Male
1995	Malathi Krishnamurthy Holla	Athletics§	Female
1995	Mukesh Kumar	Hockey	Male
1995	Anil Kumble	Cricket	Male
1995	Dhanraj Pillay	Hockey	Male
1995	Jyotirmoyee Sikdar	Athletics	Female
1995	Shakti Singh	Athletics	Male
1996	Ashish Ballal	Hockey	Male
1996	Ajit Bhaduria	Athletics	Male
1996	Shriram Bhavsar	Kabaddi	Male
1996	Poonam Chopra	Judo	Female
1996	Neta Moreshwar Dadwe	Kabaddi	Female
1996	Sandeep Singh Dhillon	Badminton§	Male
1996	Kalle Gowda	Athletics & Cricket§	Male
1996	A. Maria Irudayam	Carrom	Male
1996	Moraad Ali Khan	Shooting	Male
1996	V. Kutraleeswaran	Swimming	Male
1996	Amit Luthra	Golf	Male
1996	Gaurav Natekar	Lawn Tennis	Male
1996	Kelly Subbanand Rao^{#}	Yachting	Male
1996	Rajkumar Sangwan	Boxing	Male
1996	Javagal Srinath	Cricket	Male
1996	A. B. Subbaiah	Hockey	Male
1996	Padmini Thomas	Athletics	Female
1996	Surender Singh Waldia	Rowing	Male
1997	Reeth Abraham	Athletics	Female
1997	Chetan Baboor	Table Tennis	Male
1997	Sourav Ganguly	Cricket	Male
1997	Misha Grewal	Squash	Female
1997	Asif Ismail	Lawn Tennis	Male
1997	Ajay Jadeja	Cricket	Male
1997	Harmik Kahlon	Golf	Male
1997	Sanjay Kumar	Wrestling	Male
1997	Satendra Kumar	Shooting	Male
1997	N. Laxmi	Weightlifting	Female
1997	M. Mahadev	Athletics & Cricket§	Male
1997	Brahmanand Sankhwalkar	Football	Male
1997	Ashok Harishankar Shandilya	Billiards & Snooker	Male
1997	Naresh Kumar Sharma	Shooting§	Male
1997	Paramjit Sharma	Weightlifting	Male
1997	Harmik Singh	Hockey	Male
1997	Jagdish Singh	Wrestling	Male
1997	Rajinder Singh	Hockey	Male
1997	Randhir Singh	Kabaddi	Male
1997	Shilpi Singh	Shooting	Female
1997	Surinder Singh Sodhi	Hockey	Male
1998	Bhaichung Bhutia	Football	Male
1998	Baljit Singh Dhillon	Hockey	Male
1998	Rahul Dravid	Cricket	Male
1998	Anju Dua	Gymnastics§	Female
1998	S. D. Eshan	Athletics	Male
1998	Maharaj Krishan Kaushik	Hockey	Male
1998	Ashan Kumar	Kabaddi	Male
1998	S. Omana Kumari	Hockey	Female
1998	Rachita Mistry	Athletics	Male
1998	Nayan Mongia	Cricket	Male
1998	Shobha Narayan	Kho Kho	Female
1998	Biswajit Palit	Kabaddi	Male
1998	T. V. Pauly	Bodybuilding	Male
1998	Kaka Pawar	Wrestling	Male
1998	Satheesha Rai	Weightlifting	Male
1998	Sri Chand Ram	Athletics	Male
1998	Subramaniam Raman	Table Tennis	Male
1998	Ranjini Ramanujam	Badminton§	Female
1998	Surjit Singh Randhawa^{#}	Hockey	Male
1998	Mohammed Riaz	Hockey	Male
1998	Bhanu Sachdeva	Swimming	Male
1998	Manavjit Singh Sandhu	Shooting	Male
1998	Baldev Singh	Hockey	Male
1998	Dingko Singh	Boxing	Male
1998	Narender Singh	Judo	Male
1998	Neelam Jaswant Singh	Athletics	Female
1998	Paramjit Singh	Athletics	Male
1998	Rohtas Singh	Wrestling	Male
1998	Pritam Rani Siwach	Hockey	Female
1998	Roopa Unnikrishnan	Shooting	Female
1999	Parduman Singh Brar ^{+}	Athletics	Male
1999	Gulab Chand	Athletics	Male
1999	Sajjan Singh Cheema ^{+}	Basketball	Male
1999	Pullela Gopichand	Badminton	Male
1999	Gurmeet Kaur	Athletics	Female
1999	Haripal Kaushik ^{+}	Hockey	Male
1999	Balbir Singh Kullar ^{+}	Hockey	Male
1999	Ashok Kumar ^{+}	Wrestling	Male
1999	Jitender Kumar	Boxing	Male
1999	Nisha Millet	Swimming	Female
1999	Aashim Mongia	Yachting	Male
1999	Victor Philips ^{+}	Hockey	Male
1999	Tirath Raj ^{+}	Kabaddi	Male
1999	Sunita Rani	Athletics	Female
1999	Balwinder Singh ^{+}	Kabaddi	Male
1999	Dalbir Singh	Weightlifting	Male
1999	Gurcharan Singh	Boxing	Male
1999	Jagjit Singh	Rowing	Male
1999	Jeev Milkha Singh	Golf	Male
1999	Ramandeep Singh	Hockey	Male
1999	Sukhpal Singh	Volleyball	Male
1999	Vivek Singh	Shooting	Male
1999	G. Venkataravanappa ^{+}	Athletics§	Male
