= List of Arjuna Award recipients (1961–1969) =

List of recipients of a sports honor in India

Arjuna Award
- Civilian award for outstanding individual achievements in National Sports
- Sponsored by: Government of India
- Established: 1961
- First award: 1961

Highlights
- Total awarded: 95 individuals + 1 team award

The Arjuna Award, officially known as the Arjuna Awards for Outstanding Performance in Sports and Games, is a sports honour of the Republic of India. It is awarded annually by the Ministry of Youth Affairs and Sports. Before the introduction of the Rajiv Gandhi Khel Ratna in 1991–1992, the Arjuna Award was the highest sporting honour of India. As of 2020, the award comprises "a bronze statuette of Arjuna, certificate, ceremonial dress, and a cash prize of ₹15 lakh (US$16,000)." (Note: The cash prize was introduced in the year 1977–1978 as a scholarship of ₹200 (US$2.10) a month for 2 years. It was revised to one time cash prize of ₹5,000 (US$53) in 1986, to ₹20,000 (US$210) in 1987, to ₹50,000 (US$530) in 1993, to ₹1.5 lakh (US$1,600) in 1998, to ₹3 lakh (US$3,200) in 2001, to ₹5 lakh (US$5,300) in 2009, and to ₹15 lakh (US$16,000) in 2020.)

== Name ==
The award is named after Arjuna, a character from the Sanskrit epic Mahabharata of ancient India. He is one of the Pandavas, depicted as a skilled archer winning the hand of Draupadi in marriage. In the Kurukshetra War, Lord Krishna becomes his charioteer teaching him the sacred knowledge of Gita. In Hindu mythology, he has been seen as a symbol of hard work, dedication and concentration.

== History ==
Instituted in 1961 to honour the outstanding sportspersons of the country, the award over the years has undergone a number of expansions, reviews, and rationalizations. The award was expanded to include all the recognised disciplines in 1977, has introduced indigenous games and physically handicapped categories in 1995 and introduced a lifetime contribution category in 1995 leading to creation of a separate Dhyan Chand Award in 2002. The latest revision in 2018 stipulates that the award is given only to the disciplines included in the events like Olympic Games, Paralympic Games, Asian Games, Commonwealth Games, World Championship and World Cup along with Cricket, Indigenous Games, and Parasports. It also recommends giving only fifteen awards in a year, relaxing in case of excellent performance in major multi-sport events, team sports, across gender and giving away of at least one award to the physically challenged category.

The nominations for the award are received from all government-recognised National Sports Federations, the Indian Olympic Association, the Sports Authority of India (SAI), the Sports Promotion and Control Boards, the state and the union territory governments and the Rajiv Gandhi Khel Ratna, Arjuna, Dhyan Chand and Dronacharya awardees of the previous years. The recipients are selected by a committee constituted by the Ministry and are honoured for their "good performance in the field of sports over a period of four years" at international level and for having shown "qualities of leadership, sportsmanship and a sense of discipline".

== Recipients ==
A total of 95 individual awards were presented in the 1960s: twenty in 1961, followed by nine in 1962, seven in 1963, seven in 1964, seven in 1965, thirteen in 1966, fifteen in 1967, seven in 1968, and ten in 1969. Individuals from twenty-one different sports were awarded, which include thirteen from hockey, twelve from athletics, eight from football, seven each from cricket and wrestling, six from weightlifting, five each from badminton and table tennis, four each from basketball, boxing, lawn tennis and swimming, three each from golf, polo and shooting, two each from squash and volleyball, and one each from billiards & snooker, chess and gymnastics. In an unusual move, the first and only team award to date was presented to the entire team of twenty mountaineers in 1965 representing the successful Indian Everest expedition of 1965.

Amongst the notable winners was Manuel Aaron, awarded in 1961. He was India's first chess International Master (IM). He obtained the title in 1961 and India did not produce a second IM for the next seventeen years. He dominated the chess in India, becoming national champion nine times between 1959 and 1981. Hockey players Charanjit Singh and Shankar Lakshman were awarded in 1963 and 1964 respectively. The former was the captain of the gold winning Indian men's hockey team at 1964 Summer Olympics at Tokyo. The latter was the goalkeeper of the Indian team in the 1956, 1960 and 1964 Olympics, helping the team win two gold medals and one silver medal.

== List of recipients ==
Award recipients by year
Year	Number of recipients
1961	20
1962	9
1963	7
1964	7
1965	7(+ 1 team award)
1966	13
1967	15
1968	7
1969	10

Award recipients by sport
Sport	Number of recipients
Athletics	12
Badminton	5
Basketball	4
Billiards & Snooker	1
Boxing	4
Chess	1
Cricket	7
Football	8
Golf	3
Gymnastics	1
Hockey	13
Lawn Tennis	4
Mountaineering	1(team award)
Polo	3
Shooting	3
Squash	2
Swimming	4
Table Tennis	5
Volleyball	2
Weightlifting	6
Wrestling	7

Award recipients by gender
Gender	Number of recipients
Female	10
Male	85

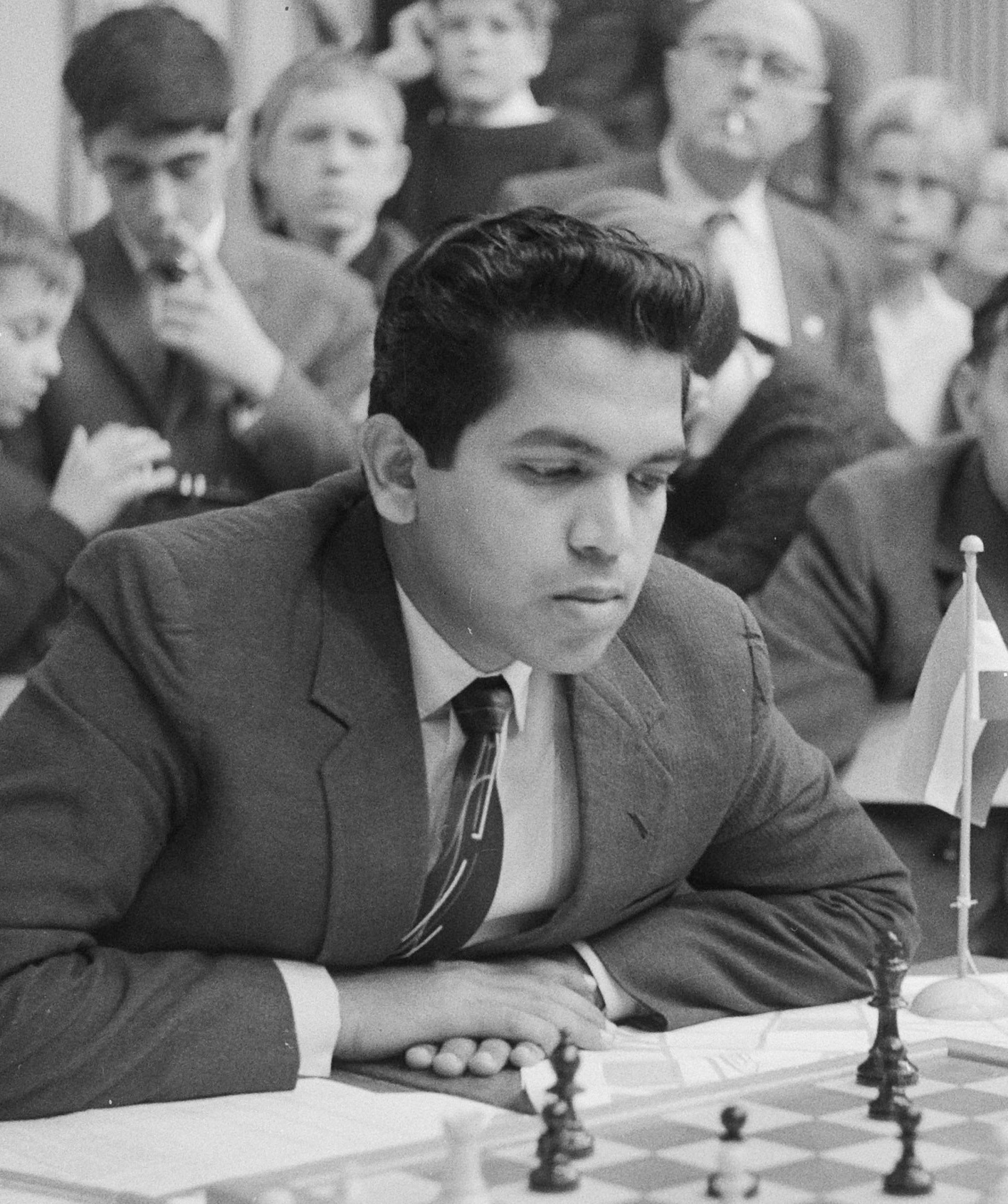
Manuel Aaron

List of Arjuna award recipients, showing the year, sport, and gender
Year	Recipient	Sport	Gender
1961	Manuel Aaron	Chess	Male
1961	P. K. Banerjee	Football	Male
1961	Udey Chand	Wrestling	Male
1961	Buddy D'Souza	Boxing	Male
1961	Salim Durani	Cricket	Male
1961	A. N. Ghosh	Weightlifting	Male
1961	K. S. Jain	Squash	Male
1961	Ramanathan Krishnan	Lawn Tennis	Male
1961	Sham Lal	Gymnastics	Male
1961	Anne Lumsden	Hockey	Female
1961	Nandu M. Natekar	Badminton	Male
1961	A. Palanisamy	Volleyball	Male
1961	Bajarangi Prasad	Swimming	Male
1961	Gurbachan Singh Randhawa	Athletics	Male
1961	P. G. Sethi	Golf	Male
1961	Karni Singh	Shooting	Male
1961	Prem Singh	Polo	Male
1961	Prithipal Singh	Hockey	Male
1961	Sarbjit Singh	Basketball	Male
1961	J. C. Vohra	Table Tennis	Male
1962	Tulsidas Balaram	Football	Male
1962	Nripjit Singh Bedi	Volleyball	Male
1962	Laxmi Kanta Das	Weightlifting	Male
1962	Wilson Jones	Billiards	Male
1962	Naresh Kumar	Lawn Tennis	Male
1962	Padam Badadur Mal	Boxing	Male
1962	Meena Shah	Badminton	Female
1962	Malwa Singh	Wrestling	Male
1962	Tarlok Singh	Athletics	Male
1963	Ganpat Andalkar	Wrestling	Male
1963	Stephie D'Souza	Athletics	Female
1963	Chuni Goswami	Football	Male
1963	Ashok Malik	Golf	Male
1963	Kamineni Eswara Rao	Weightlifting	Male
1963	Charanjit Singh	Hockey	Male
1963	Kishen Singh	Polo	Male
1964	Gautam R. Diwan	Table Tennis	Male
1964	Shankar Lakshman	Hockey	Male
1964	Mansoor Ali Khan Pataudi	Cricket	Male
1964	Bishambar Singh	Wrestling	Male
1964	Hanut Singh	Polo	Male
1964	Jarnail Singh	Football	Male
1964	Makhan Singh	Athletics	Male
1965	Balbir Singh Bhatia	Weightlifting	Male
1965	Elvera Britto	Hockey	Female
1965	Arun Ghosh	Football	Male
1965	Dinesh Khanna	Badminton	Male
1965	Vijay Manjrekar	Cricket	Male
1965	Kenneth Powell	Athletics	Male
1965	Udham Singh	Hockey	Male
1966	Bhogeswar Baruah	Athletics	Male
1966	Chandu Borde	Cricket	Male
1966	Usha Sunder Das	Table Tennis	Female
1966	Rima Dutta	Swimming	Female
1966	Mohon Lal Ghosh	Weightlifting	Male
1966	Yousuf Khan	Football	Male
1966	Jaidip Mukerjea	Lawn Tennis	Male
1966	John Peter	Hockey	Male
1966	Sunita Puri	Hockey	Female
1966	Ajmer Singh	Athletics	Male
1966	Bhim Singh	Wrestling	Male
1966	Gurbaksh Singh	Hockey	Male
1966	Hawa Singh	Boxing	Male
1967	Savarimuthu John Cabriel	Weightlifting	Male
1967	Suresh Goel	Badminton	Male
1967	Faruk R. Khodaiji	Table Tennis	Male
1967	Mohinder Lal	Hockey	Male
1967	Premjit Lall	Lawn Tennis	Male
1967	Raj Kumar Pitambar	Golf	Male
1967	Khushi Ram	Basketball	Male
1967	Arun Shaw	Swimming	Male
1967	Bhim Singh	Athletics	Male
1967	Harbinder Singh	Hockey	Male
1967	Jagjit Singh	Hockey	Male
1967	Mukhtiar Singh	Wrestling	Male
1967	Praveen Kumar Sobti	Athletics	Male
1967	Peter Thangaraj	Football	Male
1967	Ajit Wadekar	Cricket	Male
1968	Balbir Singh Kular	Hockey	Male
1968	Rajyashree Kumari	Shooting	Female
1968	E. A. S. Prasanna	Cricket	Male
1968	Gurdial Singh	Basketball	Male
1968	Joginder Singh	Athletics	Male
1968	Dennis Swamy	Boxing	Male
1968	Manjit Walia	Athletics	Female
1969	Mir Khasim Ali	Table Tennis	Male
1969	Bishan Singh Bedi	Cricket	Male
1969	Hari Dutt	Basketball	Male
1969	Dipu Ghosh	Badminton	Male
1969	Bhuvaneshwari Kumari	Shooting	Female
1969	Baidyanath Nath	Swimming	Male
1969	Anil Nayar	Squash	Male
1969	Chandgi Ram	Wrestling (Note: Indian style wrestling)	Male
1969	Harnek Singh	Athletics	Male
1969	Inder Singh	Football	Male

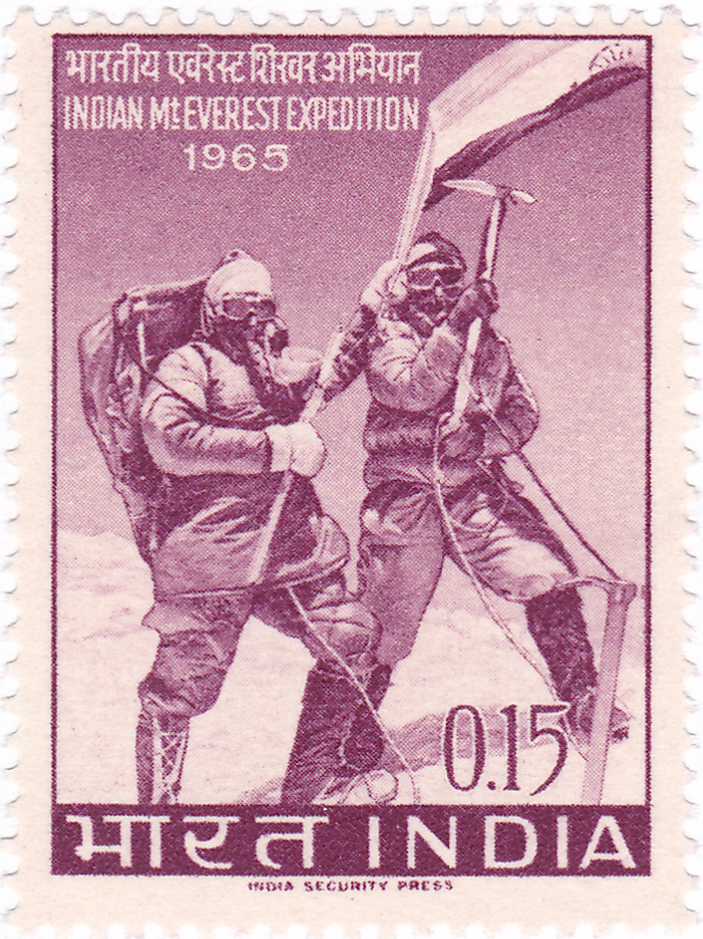
1965 Everest Expedition stamp

An Indian postage stamp (pictured) commemorated Indian's first successful Everest Expedition in 1965 (awarded team award in 1965). Avtar Singh Cheema and Nawang Gombu as seen here reached the summit in the morning of 19 May 1965. India in a single expedition placed nine men on the top of Everest, an unbroken record for the next 17 years.

List of Arjuna team award recipients, showing the year, event, and gender
Year	Recipient	Event	Gender
1965	H. P. S. Ahluwalia	1965 Indian Everest Expedition	Male
1965	Harsh Vardhan Bahuguna	1965 Indian Everest Expedition	Male
1965	C. Balakrishnan	1965 Indian Everest Expedition	Male
1965	G. S. Bhangu	1965 Indian Everest Expedition	Male
1965	A. K. Chakravarty	1965 Indian Everest Expedition	Male
1965	Avtar Singh Cheema	1965 Indian Everest Expedition	Male
1965	Nawang Gombu	1965 Indian Everest Expedition	Male
1965	Sonam Gyatso	1965 Indian Everest Expedition	Male
1965	J. C. Joshi	1965 Indian Everest Expedition	Male
1965	Ang Kami	1965 Indian Everest Expedition	Male
1965	Mohan Singh Kohli	1965 Indian Everest Expedition	Male
1965	Narendra Kumar	1965 Indian Everest Expedition	Male
1965	Mulkh Raj	1965 Indian Everest Expedition	Male
1965	B. N. Rana	1965 Indian Everest Expedition	Male
1965	Harish Chandra Singh Rawat	1965 Indian Everest Expedition	Male
1965	B. P. Singh	1965 Indian Everest Expedition	Male
1965	Gurdial Singh	1965 Indian Everest Expedition	Male
1965	D. V. Telang	1965 Indian Everest Expedition	Male
1965	Chandra Prakash Vohra	1965 Indian Everest Expedition	Male
1965	Sonam Wangyal	1965 Indian Everest Expedition	Male
