= Sailing in India =

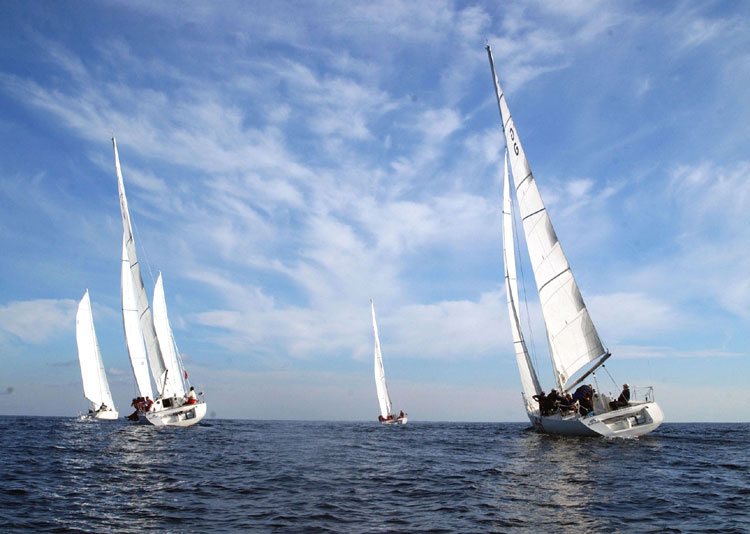
- Country: India
- Governing body: Yachting Association of India
- National team: India

Sailing as a form of transportation and for fishing has a very long history in India, owing to the large coastline and many rivers. Vessels from all parts of the world sailed to India down the ages for trade and many Indian sailors served on these ships. Sailing as a sport in India can be traced back to the first recorded race being sailed on 6 February 1830 in the western city of Bombay. Till the time the British left India in 1947, there were five active sailing clubs located at Bombay, Madras, Bangalore, Barrackpore and Nainital. Today, there are clubs located in Kerala, Pune, Goa, Hyderabad, and Bhopal. The Yachting Association of India is the governing body for sailing, windsurfing and motorboating in India. The Yachting Association of India was formally constituted on 15 May 1960. In 2011, Peter Conway of England was appointed as the national sailing coach. India's first National Sailing School (NSS) was opened at the Upper Lake in Bhopal in 2006, with support from the Indian Navy and the Yachting Association of India.

== Indians in Olympic sailing ==
The following sailors have represented India in the Olympics:

- (Germany) Munich, 1972, Soli Contractor and A. A. Basith, 29th in Flying Dutchman Class
- (United States) Los Angeles, 1984, Farokh Tarapore & Dhruv Bhandari, 17th in 470 Class
- (South Korea) Seoul, 1988, Farokh Tarapore & Kelly Rao, 17th in 470 Class
- (Spain) Barcelona, 1992, Farokh Tarapore & Cyrus Cama, 23rd in 470 Class
- (Greece) Athens, 2004, Malav Shroff & Sumeet Patel, 19th in 49er Class
- (China) Beijing, 2008, Nachhatar Singh Johal, 23rd in Finn Class
- (Japan) Tokyo 2020, 17th in Men's 49er, 20th in Men's Laser, 35th in Women's Laser Radial

== Total medals won by Indian Sailors in Major tournaments ==
Competition	Gold	Silver	Bronze	Total
Asian Games	1	8	14	23
Total	1	8	14	23

- updated till 2023

=== List of National Sports award recipients in Yachting, showing the year, award, and gender ===
Year	Recipient	Award	Gender
1993–1994	Pushpendra Kumar Garg	Rajiv Gandhi Khel Ratna	Male
1993–1994	Homi Motivala	Rajiv Gandhi Khel Ratna	Male
1970	S. J. Contractor	Arjuna Award	Male
1973	Afsar Hussain	Arjuna Award	Male
1978–1979	S. K. Mongia	Arjuna Award	Male
1981	Zarir Karanjia	Arjuna Award	Male
1982	Farokh Tarapore	Arjuna Award	Male
1982	Fali Unwalla	Arjuna Award	Male
1982	Jeeje Unwalla	Arjuna Award	Male
1986	Dhruv Bhandari	Arjuna Award	Male
1987	C. S. Pradipak	Arjuna Award	Male
1990	Pushpendra Kumar Garg	Arjuna Award	Male
1993	Homi Motivala	Arjuna Award	Male
1996	Kelly Subbanand Rao^{#}	Arjuna Award	Male
1999	Aashim Mongia	Arjuna Award	Male
2001	Mahesh Ramchandran	Arjuna Award	Male
2002	Nitin Mongia	Arjuna Award	Male
2009	Girdhari Lal Yadav	Arjuna Award	Male
2010	Rajesh Chaudhary	Arjuna Award	Male
2002	Homi Motivala	Dronacharya Award	Male

Key
# Indicates a posthumous honour

== See also ==
- Category:Indian sailors
