= List of National Sports Award recipients in shooting =

National Sports Awards in Shooting
- Various civilian awards for contributions to Sports (Individual/Team)
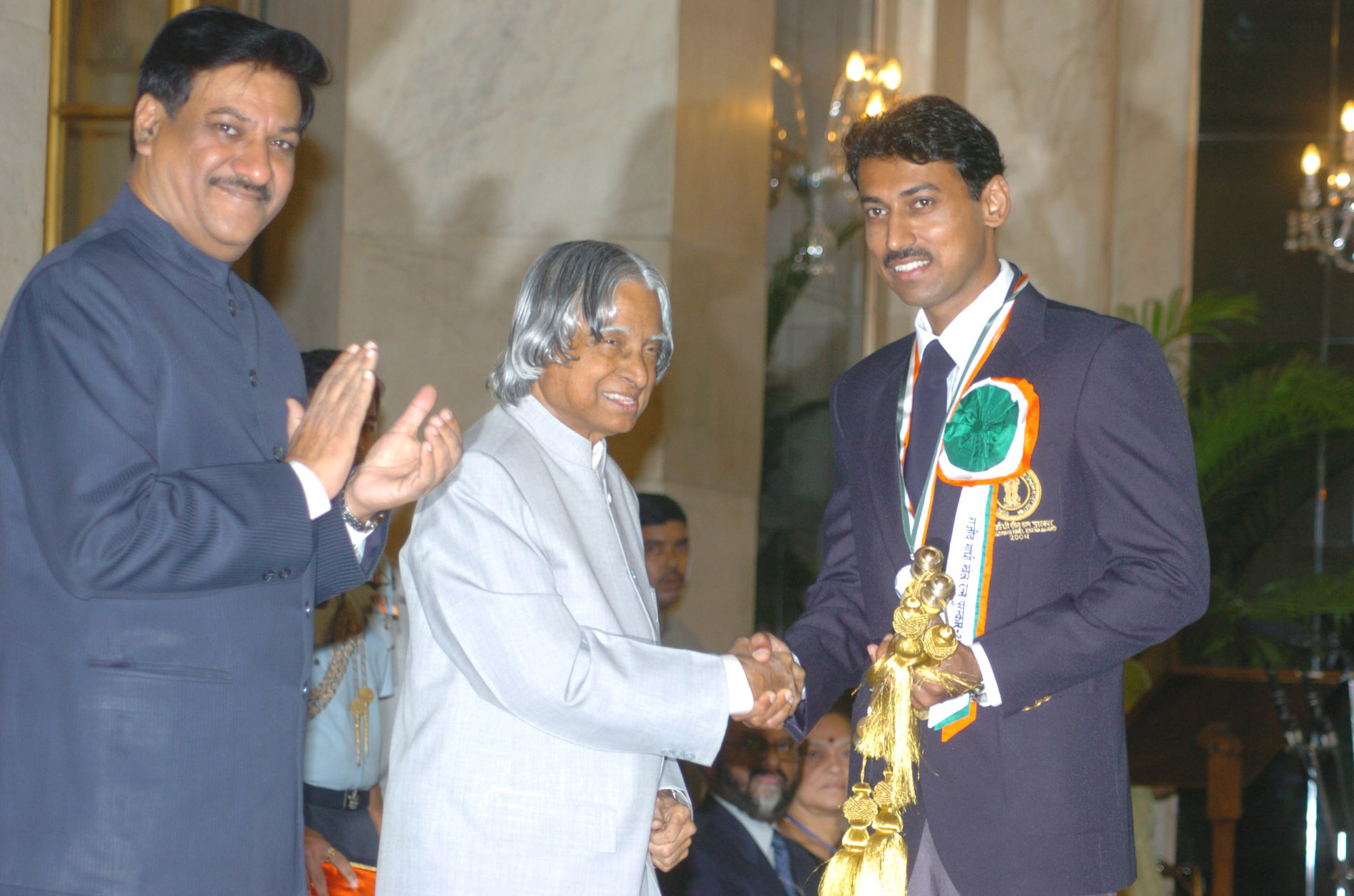
- Awarded for: Various sports honour of India
- Sponsored by: Government of India
- Location: Rashtrapati Bhavan
- Country: Republic of India
- Presented by: President of India
- First award: 1961
- Final award: 2024

Highlights
- Total awarded: 68
- Awards: Arjuna Award; Dronacharya Award; Major Dhyan Chand Khel Ratna; Dhyan Chand Award

The National Sports Awards is the collective name given to the six sports awards of Republic of India. It is awarded annually by the Ministry of Youth Affairs and Sports. They are presented by the President of India in the same ceremony at the Rashtrapati Bhavan usually on 29 August each year along with the national adventure award. As of 2020, a total of fifty-nine individuals have been awarded the various National Sports Awards in shooting. The four awards presented in shooting are Major Dhyan Chand Khel Ratna, Arjuna Award, Dhyan Chand Award and Dronacharya Award.

First presented in the year 1961, a total of forty-eight individuals have been honoured with the Arjuna Award in shooting for their "good performance at the international level" over the period of last four years, with one individual being awarded for their lifetime contribution. First presented in the year 2001, a total of three coaches have been honoured with the Dronacharya Award in shooting for their "outstanding work on a consistent basis and enabling sportspersons to excel in international events" over the period of last four years, with one coach being awarded in the lifetime contribution category. First presented in the year 2001, a total of eight sportspersons have been honoured with the Rajiv Gandhi Khel Ratna, the highest sporting honour of India, in shooting for their "most outstanding performance at the international level" over the period of last four years.

== Recipients ==
Key
+ Indicates a Lifetime contribution honour

List of National Sports award recipients, showing the year, award and gender
Year	Recipient	Award	Gender
2001	Abhinav Bindra	Rajiv Gandhi Khel Ratna	Male
2002	Anjali Bhagwat	Rajiv Gandhi Khel Ratna	Female
2004	Rajyavardhan Singh Rathore	Rajiv Gandhi Khel Ratna	Male
2006	Manavjit Singh Sandhu	Rajiv Gandhi Khel Ratna	Male
2011	Gagan Narang	Rajiv Gandhi Khel Ratna	Male
2012	Vijay Kumar	Rajiv Gandhi Khel Ratna	Male
2013	Ronjan Sodhi	Rajiv Gandhi Khel Ratna	Male
2016	Jitu Rai	Rajiv Gandhi Khel Ratna	Male
2024	Manu Bhaker	Major Dhyan Chand Khel Ratna	Female
1961	Karni Singh	Arjuna Award	Male
1968	Rajyashree Kumari	Arjuna Award	Female
1969	Bhuvaneshwari Kumari	Arjuna Award	Female
1971	Bhim Singh	Arjuna Award	Male
1972	Udayan Chinubhai	Arjuna Award	Male
1978–1979	Randhir Singh	Arjuna Award	Male
1981	S. P. Chauhan	Arjuna Award	Male
1983	Mohinder Lal	Arjuna Award	Male
1985	Soma Dutta	Arjuna Award	Female
1985	A. J. Pandit	Arjuna Award	Male
1986	Bhagirath Samai	Arjuna Award	Male
1993	Mansher Singh	Arjuna Award	Male
1994	Jaspal Rana	Arjuna Award	Male
1996	Moraad Ali Khan	Arjuna Award	Male
1997	Satendra Kumar	Arjuna Award	Male
1997	Shilpi Singh	Arjuna Award	Female
1998	Manavjit Singh Sandhu	Arjuna Award	Male
1998	Roopa Unnikrishnan	Arjuna Award	Female
1999	Vivek Singh	Arjuna Award	Male
2000	Anjali Bhagwat	Arjuna Award	Female
2000	Abhinav Bindra	Arjuna Award	Male
2000	Gurbir Singh Sandhu ^{+}	Arjuna Award	Male
2001	Samaresh Jung	Arjuna Award	Male
2002	Suma Shirur	Arjuna Award	Female
2002	Anwer Sultan	Arjuna Award	Male
2003	Rajyavardhan Singh Rathore	Arjuna Award	Male
2004	Deepali Deshpande	Arjuna Award	Female
2005	Gagan Narang	Arjuna Award	Male
2006	Vijay Kumar	Arjuna Award	Male
2007	Avneet Sidhu	Arjuna Award	Female
2009	Ronjan Sodhi	Arjuna Award	Male
2010	Sanjeev Rajput	Arjuna Award	Male
2011	Tejaswini Sawant	Arjuna Award	Female
2012	Joydeep Karmakar	Arjuna Award	Male
2012	Annu Raj Singh	Arjuna Award	Female
2012	Omkar Singh	Arjuna Award	Male
2013	Rajkumari Rathore	Arjuna Award	Female
2014	Heena Sidhu	Arjuna Award	Female
2015	Jitu Rai	Arjuna Award	Male
2016	Apurvi Chandela	Arjuna Award	Female
2016	Gurpreet Singh	Arjuna Award	Male
2017	Prakash Nanjappa	Arjuna Award	Male
2018	Ankur Mittal	Arjuna Award	Male
2018	Rahi Sarnobat	Arjuna Award	Female
2018	Shreyasi Singh	Arjuna Award	Female
2019	Anjum Moudgil	Arjuna Award	Female
2020	Manu Bhaker	Arjuna Award	Female
2020	Saurabh Chaudhary	Arjuna Award	Male
2021	Abhishek Verma	Arjuna Award	Male
2022	Elavenil Valarivan	Arjuna Award	Female
2022	Om Prakash Mitharval	Arjuna Award	Male
2023	Aishwary Pratap Singh Tomar	Arjuna Award	Male
2023	Esha Singh	Arjuna Award	Female
2024	Swapnil Kusale	Arjuna Award	Male
2024	Sarabjot Singh	Arjuna Award	Male
2025	Akhil Sheoran	Arjuna Award	Male
2017	Sanjoy Chakraverty ^{+}	Dronacharya Award	Male
2001	Sunny Thomas	Dronacharya Award	Male
2020	Jaspal Rana	Dronacharya Award	Male
2024	Deepali Deshpande	Dronacharya Award	Female
2025	Neha Nandkumar Chavan	Dronacharya Award	Female
