= List of Arjuna Award recipients (2000–2009) =

List of recipients of a sports honor in India

Arjuna Award
- Civilian award for outstanding individual achievements in National Sports
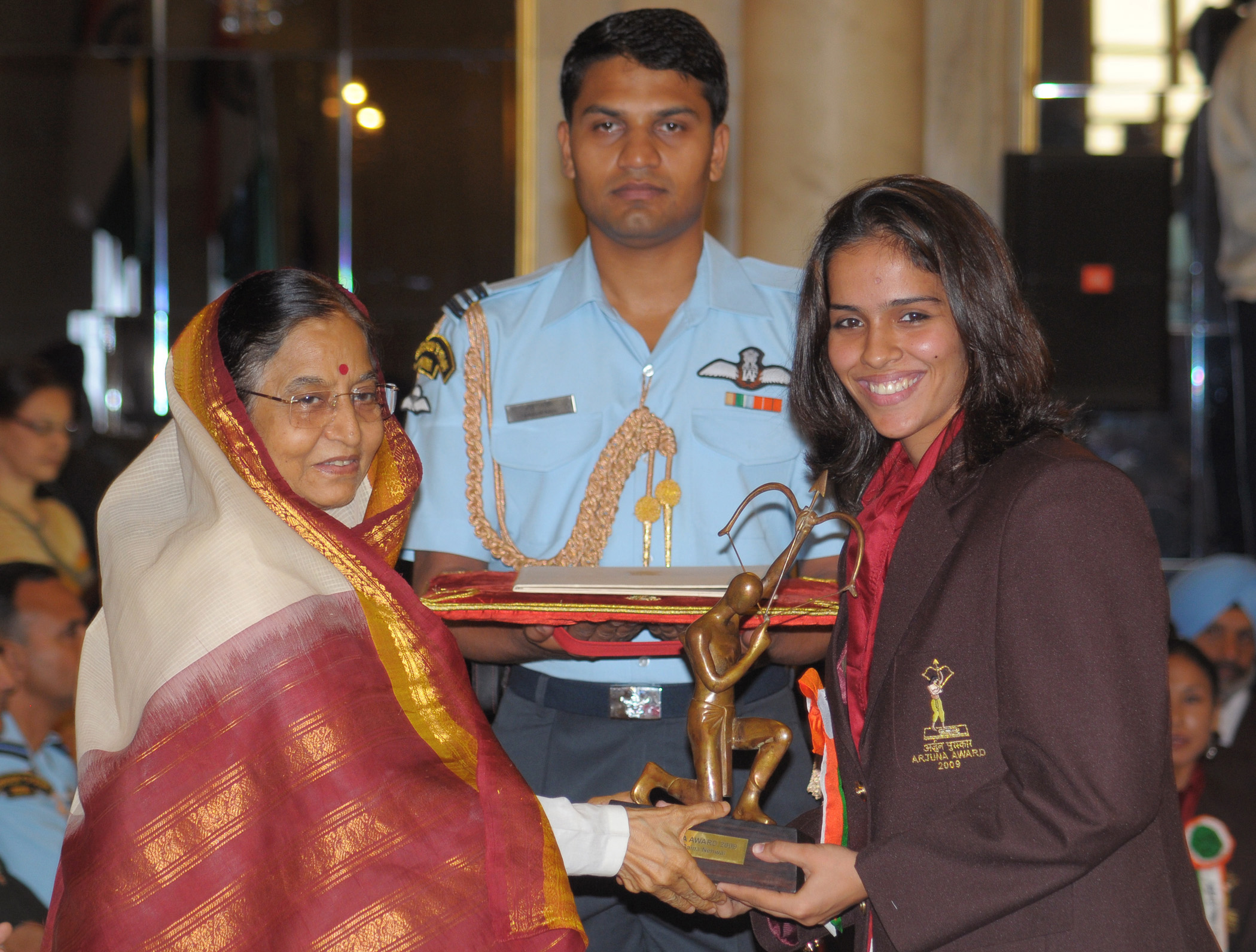
- Sponsored by: Government of India
- Established: 1961
- First award: 1961

Highlights
- Total awarded: 151

The Arjuna Award, officially known as the Arjuna Awards for Outstanding Performance in Sports and Games, is the sports honour of Republic of India. It is awarded annually by the Ministry of Youth Affairs and Sports. Before the introduction of the Rajiv Gandhi Khel Ratna in 1991–1992, the Arjuna award was the highest sporting honour of India. As of 2020, the award comprises "a bronze statuette of Arjuna, certificate, ceremonial dress, and a cash prize of ₹15 lakh (US$16,000)." (Note: The cash prize was introduced in the year 1977–1978 as a scholarship of ₹200 (US$2.10) a month for 2 years. It was revised to one time cash prize of ₹5,000 (US$53) in 1986, to ₹20,000 (US$210) in 1987, to ₹50,000 (US$530) in 1993, to ₹1.5 lakh (US$1,600) in 1998, to ₹3 lakh (US$3,200) in 2001, to ₹5 lakh (US$5,300) in 2009, and to ₹15 lakh (US$16,000) in 2020.)

== Name ==
The award is named after Arjuna, a character from the Sanskrit epic Mahabharata of ancient India. He is one of the Pandavas, depicted as a skilled archer winning the hand of Draupadi in marriage and in the Kurukshetra War, Lord Krishna becomes his charioteer teaching him the sacred knowledge of Gita. In Hindu mythology, he has been seen as a symbol of hard work, dedication and concentration.

== History ==
Instituted in 1961 to honour the outstanding sportspersons of the country, the award over the years has undergone a number of expansions, reviews, and rationalizations. The award was expanded to include all the recognised disciplines in 1977, has introduced indigenous games and physically handicapped categories in 1995 and introduced a lifetime contribution category in 1995 leading to creation of a separate Dhyan Chand Award in 2002. The latest revision in 2018 stipulates that the award is given only to the disciplines included in the events like Olympic Games, Paralympic Games, Asian Games, Commonwealth Games, World Championship and World Cup along with Cricket, Indigenous Games, and Parasports. It also recommends giving only fifteen awards in a year, relaxing in case of excellent performance in major multi-sport events, team sports, across gender and giving away of at least one award to physically challenged category.

The nominations for the award are received from all government recognised National Sports Federations, the Indian Olympic Association, the Sports Authority of India (SAI), the Sports Promotion and Control Boards, the state and the union territory governments and the Rajiv Gandhi Khel Ratna, Arjuna, Dhyan Chand and Dronacharya awardees of the previous years. The recipients are selected by a committee constituted by the Ministry and are honoured for their "good performance in the field of sports over a period of four years" at international level and for having shown "qualities of leadership, sportsmanship and a sense of discipline".

== Recipients ==
A total of 151 awards were presented in the 2000s – thirty-one in 2000, followed by fourteen in 2001, twenty-one in 2002, fifteen in 2003, fifteen in 2004, fifteen in 2005, fourteen in 2006, eleven in 2007 and fifteen in 2009. Individuals from twenty-six different sports were awarded, which includes nineteen from hockey, eighteen from athletics, thirteen from wrestling, twelve from shooting, nine from badminton, eight each from cricket and kabaddi, seven from chess, six each from boxing and rowing, five from table tennis, four each from archery and billiards & snooker, three each from golf, judo, lawn tennis, swimming, volleyball, weightlifting and yachting, two each from equestrian, football and powerlifting, and one each from basketball, gymnastics and squash.

A major controversy arose in 2001 when Milkha Singh refused to accept the lifetime contribution honour in athletics, being the only sportsperson to date to do so. Milkha Singh, nicknamed The Flying Sikh, was the first Indian athlete to win an individual athletics gold medal at a Commonwealth Games and is best remembered for his fourth-place finish in the 400 metres final at the 1960 Summer Olympics in which he had entered as one of the favourites; his time of 45.73 seconds stood as the Indian national record for almost 40 years. A biographical Bollywood film based on his life, Bhaag Milkha Bhaag, was released in 2013 to critical and commercial success. His reasoning for declining the award included being clubbed with other sportspersons who were not deserving, politicization and lobbying for the award instead of specialists selecting the winners, and the awarding of players who had one good performance in their lifetime in a non-notable competition rather than awarding consistent performers and medalists at the most prestigious international competitions. The "other sportspersons" have been commonly interpreted as Rachna Govil, awarded the lifetime contribution honour of 2000 in athletics, and Kalpana Debnath, awarded the lifetime contribution honour of 2000 in gymnastics. The former was then the deputy director of Sports Authority of India and the latter was then warden of the National Institute of Sports girls hostel in Patiala. Asian discus champion Anil Kumar challenged both the awards in the Delhi High Court, claiming that both awards seemed less on their individual merits and achievements and more on the political influence and lobbying. Due to the stature of Milkha Singh and the attention the controversy garnered, the Sports Ministry revamped the selection system from the year 2002 onwards and introduced a new award for lifetime achievement in sports, the Dhyan Chand Award. Despite him never accepting the award, Singh's name is on the official awardees list.

== List of recipients ==
Award recipients by year
Year	Number of recipients
2000	31
2001	14
2002	21
2003	15
2004	15
2005	15
2006	14
2007	11
2009	15

Award recipients by sport
Sport	Number of recipients
Archery	4
Athletics	18
Badminton	9
Basketball	1
Billiards & Snooker	4
Boxing	6
Chess	7
Cricket	8
Equestrian	2
Football	2
Golf	3
Gymnastics	1
Hockey	19
Judo	3
Kabaddi	8
Lawn Tennis	3
Powerlifting	2
Rowing	6
Shooting	12
Squash	1
Swimming	3
Table Tennis	5
Volleyball	3
Weightlifting	3
Wrestling	13
Yachting	3

Key
§ Indicates Para sports	+ Indicates a Lifetime contribution honour	# Indicates a posthumous honour

List of Arjuna award recipients, showing the year, sport, and gender
Year	Recipient	Sport	Gender
2000	J. Abhijith	Swimming	Male
2000	Akhtar Ali ^{+}	Lawn Tennis	Male
2000	Joginder Singh Bedi ^{+}	Athletics§	Male
2000	K. M. Beenamol	Athletics	Female
2000	Anjali Bhagwat	Shooting	Female
2000	Vijayamala Bhanot ^{+}	Athletics	Female
2000	Raghbir Singh Bhola ^{+}	Hockey	Male
2000	Abhinav Bindra	Shooting	Male
2000	Sanamacha Chanu	Weightlifting	Female
2000	Tingonleima Chanu	Hockey	Female
2000	Kalpana Debnath ^{+}	Gymnastics	Female
2000	Rachna Govil ^{+}	Athletics	Female
2000	Sandhu Singh Gurbir ^{+}	Shooting	Male
2000	C. Honappa	Kabaddi	Male
2000	K. D. Jadhav^{#} ^{+}	Wrestling ^{+}	Male
2000	Surender Singh Kanwasi ^{+}	Rowing	Male
2000	Naresh Kumar ^{+}	Wrestling	Male
2000	Vijay Bhalanchandra Munishwar	Athletics & Powerlifting§	Male
2000	Kripa Shankar Patel	Wrestling	Male
2000	Venkatesh Prasad	Cricket	Male
2000	P. V. Ramana ^{+}	Volleyball	Male
2000	Jalaluddin Rizvi ^{+}	Hockey	Male
2000	Baljit Singh Saini	Hockey	Male
2000	Balkrishan Singh ^{+}	Hockey	Male
2000	Milkha Singh ^{+}	Athletics	Male
2000	Randhir Singh	Wrestling	Male
2000	George Thomas	Badminton	Male
2000	Yadvendra Vashishta	Athletics§	Male
2000	Subbaraman Vijayalakshmi	Chess	Female
2000	Sebastian Xavier	Swimming	Male
2000	Madhu Yadav ^{+}	Hockey	Female
2001	Bruno Coutinho	Football	Male
2001	Sita Gussain	Hockey	Female
2001	K. R. Shankar Iyer	Athletics§	Male
2001	Devender Sreekant Joshi	Billiards & Snooker	Male
2001	Samaresh Jung	Shooting	Male
2001	Kasam Khan	Rowing	Male
2001	Sandeep Kirtane	Lawn Tennis	Male
2001	Ramesh Kumar	Wrestling	Male
2001	VVS Laxman	Cricket	Male
2001	Mahesh Ramchandran	Yachting	Male
2001	B. C. Ramesh	Kabaddi	Male
2001	Amir Singh	Volleyball	Male
2001	Parmender Singh	Basketball	Male
2001	Dilip Tirkey	Hockey	Male
2002	Palwinder Singh Cheema	Wrestling	Male
2002	Anju Bobby George	Athletics	Female
2002	Mantu Ghosh	Table Tennis	Female
2002	Shiv Kapur	Golf	Male
2002	Mamta Kharab	Hockey	Female
2002	Alok Kumar	Billiards & Snooker	Male
2002	Sujeet Mann	Wrestling	Male
2002	Nitin Mongia	Yachting	Male
2002	Thandava Murthy Muthu	Weightlifting	Male
2002	Mohammed Ali Qamar	Boxing	Male
2002	Ravikant Reddy	Volleyball	Male
2002	Saraswati Saha	Athletics	Female
2002	Krishnan Sasikiran	Chess	Male
2002	Virender Sehwag	Cricket	Male
2002	Suma Shirur	Shooting	Female
2002	Gagan Ajit Singh	Hockey	Male
2002	Inderpal Singh	Rowing	Male
2002	Ram Mehar Singh	Kabaddi	Male
2002	Anwer Sultan	Shooting	Male
2002	Ramesh Tikaram	Badminton & Athletics§	Male
2002	I. M. Vijayan	Football	Male
2003	Pankaj Advani	Billiards & Snooker	Male
2003	Soma Biswas	Athletics	Female
2003	Devesh Chauhan	Hockey	Male
2003	Suraj Lata Devi	Hockey	Female
2003	Koneru Humpy	Chess	Female
2003	Mary Kom	Boxing	Female
2003	Sanjeev Kumar	Kabaddi	Male
2003	Rajesh Pattu	Equestrian	Male
2003	Mithali Raj	Cricket	Female
2003	Madasu Srinivas Rao	Badminton§	Male
2003	Rajyavardhan Singh Rathore	Shooting	Male
2003	Madhuri Saxena	Athletics	Female
2003	Akram Shah	Judo	Male
2003	Harbhajan Singh	Cricket	Male
2003	Shokinder Tomar	Wrestling	Male
2004	Deep Kumar Ahlawat	Equestrian	Male
2004	Angom Anita Chanu	Judo	Female
2004	Deepali Deshpande	Shooting	Female
2004	Abhinn Shyam Gupta	Badminton	Male
2004	Devendra Jhajharia	Athletics§	Male
2004	Sharath Kamal	Table Tennis	Male
2004	Jenil Krishnan	Rowing	Male
2004	Anuj Kumar	Wrestling	Male
2004	Helen Mary	Hockey	Female
2004	Sania Mirza	Lawn Tennis	Female
2004	Anil Kumar Prakash	Athletics	Male
2004	Jyoti Randhawa	Golf	Male
2004	J. J. Shobha	Athletics	Female
2004	Sunder Singh	Kabaddi	Male
2004	Deepak Thakur	Hockey	Male
2005	Dola Banerjee	Archery	Female
2005	Surya Shekhar Ganguly	Chess	Male
2005	Anju Jain	Cricket	Female
2005	Manjeet Kaur	Athletics	Female
2005	Akhil Kumar	Boxing	Male
2005	Ramesh Kumar	Kabaddi	Male
2005	Sushil Kumar	Wrestling	Male
2005	Gagan Narang	Shooting	Male
2005	Aparna Popat	Badminton	Female
2005	Rajinder Singh Rahelu	Powerlifting§	Male
2005	Tarundeep Rai	Archery	Male
2005	Viren Rasquinha	Hockey	Male
2005	Soumyadeep Roy	Table Tennis	Male
2005	Shikha Tandon	Swimming	Female
2005	Anuja Thakur	Billiards & Snooker	Female
2006	Chetan Anand	Badminton	Male
2006	Rohit Bhaker	Badminton§	Male
2006	K. M. Binu	Athletics	Male
2006	Anjum Chopra	Cricket	Female
2006	Navneet Gautam	Kabaddi	Male
2006	Saurav Ghosal	Squash	Male
2006	Pentala Harikrishna	Chess	Male
2006	Geetika Jakhar	Wrestling	Female
2006	Jyoti Sunita Kullu	Hockey	Female
2006	Vijay Kumar	Shooting	Male
2006	Geeta Rani	Weightlifting	Female
2006	Subhajit Saha	Table Tennis	Male
2006	Vijender Singh	Boxing	Male
2006	Jayanta Talukdar	Archery	Male
2007	Arjun Atwal	Golf	Male
2007	Farman Basha	Powerlifting§	Male
2007	Tombi Devi	Judo	Female
2007	Harika Dronavalli	Chess	Female
2007	Varghese Johnson	Boxing	Male
2007	Avneet Sidhu	Shooting	Female
2007	Prabhjot Singh	Hockey	Male
2007	Chitra Soman	Athletics	Female
2007	Anup Sridhar	Badminton	Male
2007	Bajrang Lal Takhar	Rowing	Male
2007	Alka Tomar	Wrestling	Female
2009	Mangal Singh Champia	Archery	Male
2009	Laishram Sarita Devi	Boxing	Female
2009	Yogeshwar Dutt	Wrestling	Male
2009	Gautam Gambhir	Cricket	Male
2009	Poulomi Ghatak	Table Tennis	Female
2009	Satish Joshi	Rowing	Male
2009	Surinder Kaur	Hockey	Female
2009	Saina Nehwal	Badminton	Female
2009	Parul Parmar	Badminton§	Female
2009	Sinimole Paulose	Athletics	Female
2009	Tania Sachdev	Chess	Female
2009	Pankaj Navnath Shirsat	Kabaddi	Male
2009	Ronjan Sodhi	Shooting	Male
2009	Ignace Tirkey	Hockey	Male
2009	Girdhari Lal Yadav	Yachting	Male
