= Mir Khasim Ali =

Indian table tennis player

Mir Khasim Ali born in Hyderabad, A.P. was India's Men's Singles Champion in table tennis from 1968 to 1969. He was awarded the Arjuna award.

== Career ==
Ali began playing table tennis in 1960 at the age of 11. He was the National Junior Champion in 1963, the National Senior Champion in 1968 and 1969, runner-up in the Commonwealth Championships of the Afro-Asian Championships in 1971 and a member of the Indian T.T. team from 1966 to 1973.

His first trip abroad representing India was to East Africa in 1966. Also in 1966 in Sri Lanka (Ceylon as it was then called) where the South Zone Inter-University Championships were held. Khasim represented Osmania University, which lost in the finals to Bombay University, thanks to U.S. Gurjar who pulled off an upset win over Khasim.

Gurjar repeated the feat in the Madras Nationals in December 1966. He was National Champion in 1968 and 1969 and runner-up in 1970. In 1971 he met Zhou Enlai and was present during the Ping Pong Diplomacy between China and the United States. During his heyday, Andhra Pradesh reached the finals of the National team events on nine occasions, winning the title once, and until 1973 he was an automatic choice in the Indian team.
