= Bhupender Dhawan =

Indian weightlifter and coach

- Occupation: Coach
- Years active: 1978-present
- Awards: Dronacharya Award

Bhupender Dhawan is an Indian weightlifter and coach. He has coached in powerlifting and bodybuilding. Between 1994 and 2019, he coached the Indian powerlifting team and has also been the coach of the national bodybuilding squad. In 1997, he was named "the best coach & player" of the year 1996–97 by the then Chief Minister of Delhi Sahib Singh and in 2000, he was awarded the Dronacharya Award for Outstanding Coaches in Sports and Games, India's highest award in the field of coaching of sports and athletics, by the then president of India K. R. Narayanan. Dhawan was the first powerlifting coach to receive the Dronacharya Award. He was also awarded with the Hall of Fame by the World Powerlifting Union & British Power Lifting Federation in Birmingham, in 2017.

== See also ==
- List of National Sports Award recipients in non-Olympic sports
