= Mohinder Lal =

Mohinder Lal may refer to:

- Mohinder Lal (field hockey) (1936–2004), Indian field hockey player
- Mohinder Lal (sport shooter) (1947–2019), Indian sport shooter
