= Kishen Singh =

Indian polo player

Lieutenant Colonel Kishen Singh was a former national polo player from India. He was a member of the Indian polo team that won the World Cup in 1954 at Deauville France. He was awarded Arjuna Award in 1963. He is from Jodhpur in Rajasthan. He later converted his residence into a heritage hotel called Polo Heritage, which is currently run by his family. His two sons have also played polo for India.
