= Bhuvaneshwari Kumari =

Indian sport shooter (born 1945)

Bhuvaneshwari Kumari is an Indian sportswoman and a champion in trap shooting. She was awarded an Arjuna Award in 1969. She was born in on 29 May 1945 at Bombay and married Thakur Devi Singh, of Malassar, in Bikaner.
