= Raju Bhavsar =

Indian Kabaddi player

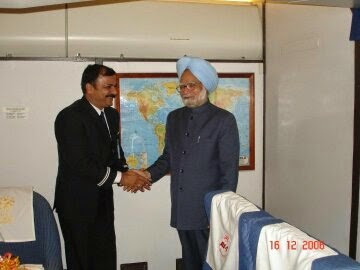
- Bhavsar with Manmohan Singh

Personal information
- Full name: Sriram (raju) Dinanath Bhavsar
- Nationality: Indian
- Born: Raju Bhavsar; 30 August 1962 (age 64) Ahmednagar, Maharashtra
- Occupation: Sr.Flight purser at Air india
- Years active: 1976 to 2004
- Employer: Air india
- Height: 173 cm (5 ft 8 in)
- Weight: 84 kg (185 lb)
- Spouse: Veena bhavsar

Sport
- Country: India
- Sport: Kabaddi
- Position: All rounder
- Team: Sangli District Maharashtra State Air India India
- Turned pro: 1982
- Coached by: Bapu zambre

Raju Bhavsar is a former Indian kabaddi player. He has played for national kabaddi team and represented in international tournaments for almost eight years.

== Career ==
He played for Mumbai Maharashtra. His playing style was all rounder. He was the captain of the national kabaddi team, which won a historic gold medal in the first ever indoor international kabaddi tournament held at Birmingham, England in 1993.

He represented India and won a gold medal for India at the kabaddi Asian championship held at Calcutta in 1987.

He was part of the Indian kabaddi team that qualified for the 9th kabaddi Asian games in Beijing, winning gold against Bangladesh in 1990.

He was awarded India's second highest sports honour, Arjuna Award in 1996 by the President of India.

Currently he is working with Air India in Inflight Services Dept as Cabin Supervisor. He is also a kabaddi expert for leading sports broadcaster 'Star Sports' for Pro Kabaddi League & world Cup 2016.

== Early days ==
Raju entered kabaddi at 14, watching his elder brothers Vivek & Hemant playing. He played for a well known kabaddi club of Sangli (Maharashtra) "Jai Mathrubhumi Vyayam Mandal"

From the age of 16 he showed potential and at the age of 19 he was selected in Maharashtra men's team for Senior nationals.

Raju was picked up by a professional team "Vanaz Engineers", Pune. After playing for 4 years he was offered a job by national carrier "Air India" at Mumbai.

== Playing style ==
Having equal command over raiding and defence, Raju Bhavsar was a notable all-rounder. He was a both side raider and solid right center. He is the only player who has played on all 4 defensive positions for Maharashtra men's team in Nationals. He was known as master strategist and tactician.

== Achievements and awards ==
- Highest award for sportspersons in Maharashtra state "ShivChhatrapati Puraskar" - 1986
- Highest award for sportspersons in India "Arjuna Award"-1996
- FIE national award for best sportsman of India -1990
