= Ranjith Kumar Jayaseelan =

Indian track and field athlete

Ranjith Kumar Jayaseelan is an Indian track and field para-athletics competitor. He won the bronze medal in the Men's Seated Discus Throw EAD at the 2006 Commonwealth Games, with a throw of 29.88 meters.
