= Pushpendra Kumar Garg =

Indian yacht racer

Personal information
- Nationality: Indian
- Born: 22 November 1963 (age 62) Sasni, Uttar Pradesh

Sport
- Sport: Yachting

Captain Pushpendra Kumar Garg (born 22 November 1963) is an Indian sportsperson in yachting. He was born in Sasni in Aligarh district (Now it situated at Hathras district) of Uttar Pradesh. He studied at Sainik School, Lucknow, and the National Defence Academy, Khadakvasla before joining the Indian Navy.

== Career ==
He formed a team with Homi Motivala and won the bronze medal in the enterprise class at the 1990 and 1994 Asian Games held at Beijing and Hiroshima respectively. They were also the world champions in the same class in 1993. He won the gold medal at the 1993 Enterprise Class World Championship in Zimbabwe and silver medal in 1997 Enterprise Class World Championship in Goa, India. In 2021 he was appointed as the CEO of Sports Authority of India.

== Awards ==
P. K. Garg received the Arjuna award for best performance in Yachting for the year 1990 and the Major Dhyan Chand Khel Ratna award jointly with Homi Motivala for overall best performance in sports for the year 1994–95 from the Government of India.
