= Homi Motivala =

Indian yacht racer

Homi Dady Motivala (born 18 June 1958) is an Indian sportsperson in Yachting.

He received the Arjuna award for best performance in yachting for the year 1993, the Major Dhyan Chand Khel Ratna award jointly with P. K. Garg for overall best performance in sports for the year 1994–95 and the Dronacharya Award for "Coaching excellence in Yachting" for the year 2002. Together with Garg, he won the bronze medal in the enterprise class at the 1990 and 1994 Asian Games held at Beijing and Hiroshima respectively. They were also the world champions in the same class in 1993.

Motivala holds the rank of Commander with the Indian Navy. He received its gallantry award, the Shaurya Chakra, in 1983.
