= Girdhari Lal Yadav =

Indian sailor

Girdhari Lal Yadav is a competitive sailor from Madhya Pradesh. He is a 2009 recipient of the Arjuna Award.

He was awarded with the Vishwamitra Award in December 2020, which is Madhya Pradesh's highest sporting honor for coaches by the Government of Madhya Pradesh.
