= Kelly Subbanand Rao =

Indian sailor (born 1963)

Personal information
- Nationality: Indian
- Born: 17 January 1963 (age 62)

Sport
- Sport: Sailing

Kelly Subbanand Rao (born 17 January 1963) is an Indian sailor. He competed in the men's 470 event at the 1988 Summer Olympics.
