= Dhyan Chand Award =

Lifetime achievement sporting honour of the Republic of India

- Awarded for: Lifetime Achievement sporting honour in India
- Sponsored by: Government of India
- Reward: ₹10 lakh (US$11,000)
- First award: 2002
- Final award: 2024

Highlights
- Total awarded: 89
- First winner: Shahuraj Birajdar; Ashok Diwan; Aparna Ghosh
- Last winner: Sucha Singh; Murlikant Petkar

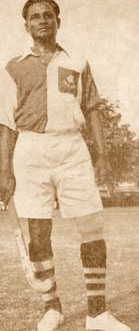
Dhyan Chand at the 1936 Summer Olympics.

The Major Dhyan Chand Award, officially known as Major Dhyan Chand Award for Lifetime Achievement in Sports and Games, is the lifetime achievement sporting honour of the Republic of India. The award is named after hockey wizard Major Dhyan Chand (1905–79), a legendary Indian field hockey player who scored more than 1000 international goals during a career which spanned over 20 years from 1926 to 1948. It is awarded annually by the Ministry of Youth Affairs and Sports. Recipients are selected by a committee constituted by the Ministry and are honoured for their contributions to sport both during their active sporting career and after retirement. As of 2020, the award comprises a statuette, a certificate, ceremonial dress, and a cash prize of ₹10 lakh (US$11,000). (Note: The cash prize was revised from ₹3 lakh (US$3,200) to ₹5 lakh (US$5,300) in 2009, and to ₹10 lakh (US$11,000) in 2020.)

Instituted in 2002, the award is given only to the disciplines included in the events like Olympic Games, Paralympic Games, Asian Games, Commonwealth Games, World Championship and World Cup along with Cricket, Indigenous Games, and Parasports. The nominations for a given year are accepted till 30 April or last working day of April. A nine-member committee evaluates the nominations and later submits their recommendations to the Union Minister of Youth Affairs and Sports for further approval.

The first recipients of the award were Shahuraj Birajdar (Boxing), Ashok Diwan (Hockey), and Aparna Ghosh (Basketball), who were honoured in 2002. Usually conferred upon not more than three sportspersons in a year, a few exceptions have been made (2003, 2012–2013, and 2018–2020) when more recipients were awarded.

== Nominations ==
The nominations for the award are received from all government recognised National Sports Federations, the Indian Olympic Association, the Sports Authority of India, the Sports Promotion and Control Boards, and the state and the union territory governments with not more than two eligible sportspersons nominated for each sports discipline. The Sports Promotion and Control Boards of various Governments organizations includes the All India Police Sports Control Board, Army Sports Control Board, Railways Sports Promotion Board, Indian Navy Sports control Board, Air Force Sports Control Board, Petroleum Sports Promotion Board, Air India Sports Promotion Board, SAIL Sports Promotion Board. In case of cricket, the nominations are received from the Board of Control for Cricket in India as there is no National Sports Federation recognised by the Government. The Sports Authority of India (SAI) is authorised to submit the nominations on behalf of all the de-recognised or under suspension National Sports Federations. The previous award recipients of Rajiv Gandhi Khel Ratna, Arjuna Award, Dronacharya Award, and Dhyan Chand Award can also nominate one sportsperson for the discipline for which they themselves were awarded. The Government can nominate up to two sportspersons in deserving cases where no such nominations have been received from the nominating authorities. The nominations for a given year are accepted till 30 April or last working day of April.

== Selection process ==
All the received nominations are sent to SAI and concerned National Sports Federations for verification against the claimed achievements. The National Anti-Doping Agency is responsible for providing doping clearance. Any sportsperson who is either penalised or being investigated for use of drugs or substances banned by the World Anti-Doping Agency is not eligible for the award along with the previous award recipients of Major Dhyan Chand Khel Ratna Award, Arjuna Award, and Dronacharya Award. A committee consisting of the Joint Secretary and the Director/Deputy Secretary of Department of Sports, the Secretary and the Executive Director/Director (TEAMS) of SAI verify and validate the nominations.

The valid nominations are considered by a selection committee constituted by the Government. This nine member committee consists of a Chairperson nominated by the Ministry; four members who are either Olympians or previous recipients of the Rajiv Gandhi Khel Ratna, Arjuna or Dhyan Chand awards; two sports journalists/experts/commentators; one sports administrator; and the Director General of SAI and the Joint Secretary of Department of Sports; with not more than one sportsperson from any particular discipline being included in the committee. The medals won in various International championships and events in disciplines included in Summer and Winter Olympic and Paralympics Games, Asian Games, and Commonwealth Games are given 70% weightage. The remaining 30% weightage is given for contributions made towards promotion of sports after the candidate's retirement from an active sporting career. For any other games not included in Olympic, Asian Games, and Commonwealth Games like cricket and indigenous games, individual performances are taken into consideration. The sportsperson with maximum points is given 70 marks, while the remaining candidates are given marks in proportion to the maximum points. For team events, marks are given per the strength of the team. Following are the points defined for medals at the given events:

Points for winning medals for the performance during entire sporting career
Event	Medal		
Event	Gold	Silver	Bronze
Olympic Games/Paralympic Games	80	70	55
World Championship/World Cup (Note: A World Championship/World Cup is generally organised every four years. For different cyclicities, proportionate marks are given.)	40	30	20
Asian Games	30	25	20
Commonwealth Games	25	20	15

For a given discipline, not more than two sportspersons, one male and one female, are given highest marks. The committee may not recommend the award to the sportsperson with the highest marks across disciplines but can only recommend the recipient of the highest aggregate marks in a particular sports discipline. The recommendations of the selection committee are submitted to the Union Minister of Youth Affairs and Sports for further approval.

== Recipients ==
Key
# Indicates a posthumous honour

List of award recipients, showing the year and discipline(s)
Year	Recipient(s)	Discipline(s)	Refs.
2002	Shahuraj Birajdar	Boxing	
2002	Ashok Diwan	Hockey	
2002	Aparna Ghosh	Basketball	
2003	Charles Cornelius	Hockey	
2003	Ram Kumar	Basketball	
2003	Dharam Singh	Hockey	
2003	Om Prakash	Volleyball	
2003	Smita Shirole Yadav	Rowing	
2004	Digamber Mehendale	Athletics (Physically challenged)	
2004	Hardayal Singh	Hockey	
2004	Labh Singh	Athletics	
2005	Maruti Mane	Wrestling	
2005	Manoj Kumar Kothari	Billiards & Snooker	
2005	Rajinder Singh	Hockey	
2006	Harishchandra Birajdar	Wrestling	
2006	Uday K. Prabhu	Athletics	
2006	Nandy Singh	Hockey	
2007	Rajinder Singh	Wrestling	
2007	Shamsher Singh	Kabaddi	
2007	Varinder Singh	Hockey	
2008	Gian Singh	Wrestling	
2008	Hakam Singh	Athletics	
2008	Mukhbain Singh	Hockey	
2009	Satbir Singh Dahiya	Wrestling	
2009	Ishar Singh Deol	Athletics	
2010	Anita Chanu	Weightlifting	
2010	Satish Pillai	Athletics	
2010	Kuldeep Singh	Wrestling	
2011	Shabbir Ali	Football	
2011	Sushil Kohli	Swimming	
2011	Rajkumar Baisla	Wrestling	
2012	Gundeep Kumar	Hockey	
2012	Vinod Kumar	Wrestling	
2012	Jagraj Singh Mann	Athletics	
2012	Sukhbir Singh Tokas	Para-Sports	
2013	Syed Ali	Hockey	
2013	Anil Mann	Wrestling	
2013	Mary D'Souza Sequeira	Athletics	
2013	Girraj Singh	Athletics (Parasports)	
2014	Zeeshan Ali	Tennis	
2014	Gurmail Singh	Hockey	
2014	K. P. Thakkar	Swimming	
2015	Romeo James	Hockey	
2015	Shiv Prakash Mishra	Tennis	
2015	T. P. Padmanabhan Nair	Volleyball	
2016	Sylvanus Dung Dung	Hockey	
2016	Sathi Geetha	Athletics	
2016	Rajendra Pralhad Shelke	Rowing	
2017	Bhupender Singh	Athletics	
2017	Syed Shahid Hakim	Football	
2017	Sumrai Tete	Hockey	
2018	Satyadev Prasad	Archery	
2018	Bharat Chettri	Hockey	
2018	Bobby Aloysius	Athletics	
2018	Dadu Dattatray Chougale	Wrestling	
2019	Manuel Frederick	Hockey	
2019	Arup Basak	Table Tennis	
2019	Manoj Kumar	Wrestling	
2019	Nitin Kirtane	Tennis	
2019	Chhangte Lalremsanga	Archery	
2020	Kuldip Singh Bhullar	Athletics	
2020	Jincy Philips	Athletics	
2020	Pradeep Shrikrishna Gandhe	Badminton	
2020	Trupti Murgunde	Badminton	
2020	Usha Nagisetty	Boxing	
2020	Lakha Singh	Boxing	
2020	Sukhwinder Singh	Football	
2020	Ajit Pal Singh	Hockey	
2020	Manpreet Singh	Kabaddi	
2020	Ranjith Kumar Jayaseelan	Para Athletics	
2020	Satyaprakash Tiwari	Para Badminton	
2020	Manjeet Singh	Rowing	
2020	Sachin Nag	Swimming	
2020	Nandan Bal	Tennis	
2020	Netarpal Hooda	Wrestling	
2021	Lekha K.C.	Boxing	
2021	Abhijit Kunte	Chess	
2021	Davinder Singh	Hockey	
2021	Vikas Kumar	Kabaddi	
2021	Sajan Singh	Wrestling	
2022	Ashwini Akkunji	Athletics	
2022	Dharamvir Singh	Hockey	
2022	B.C. Suresh	Kabaddi	
2022	Nir Bahadur Gurung	Para Athletics	
2023	Manjusha Kanwar	Badminton	
2023	Vineet Kumar Sharma	Hockey	
2023	Kavitha Selvaraj	Kabaddi	
2024	Sucha Singh	Athletics	
2024	Murlikant Petkar	Para Swimming	

== Controversies ==
In August 2015, the Ministry announced the award to Romeo James (Hockey), Shiv Prakash Mishra (Tennis), and T. P. Padmanabhan Nair (Volleyball). A Public-Interest Litigation was filed in the Madras High Court by Paralympic athlete Ranjith Kumar Jayaseelan. The petitioner mentioned that he submitted the nomination after fulfilling the criteria by getting 60% for medals and 30% for contributing for sports promotion. Kumar requested to annul the award announced on three recipients. The Court ordered a notice to the Ministry seeking an explanation about the selection.
