= Khel Ratna Award =

Highest sporting honour of the Republic of India

Major Dhyan Chand Khel Ratna Award
- Highest sporting honour of the Republic of India
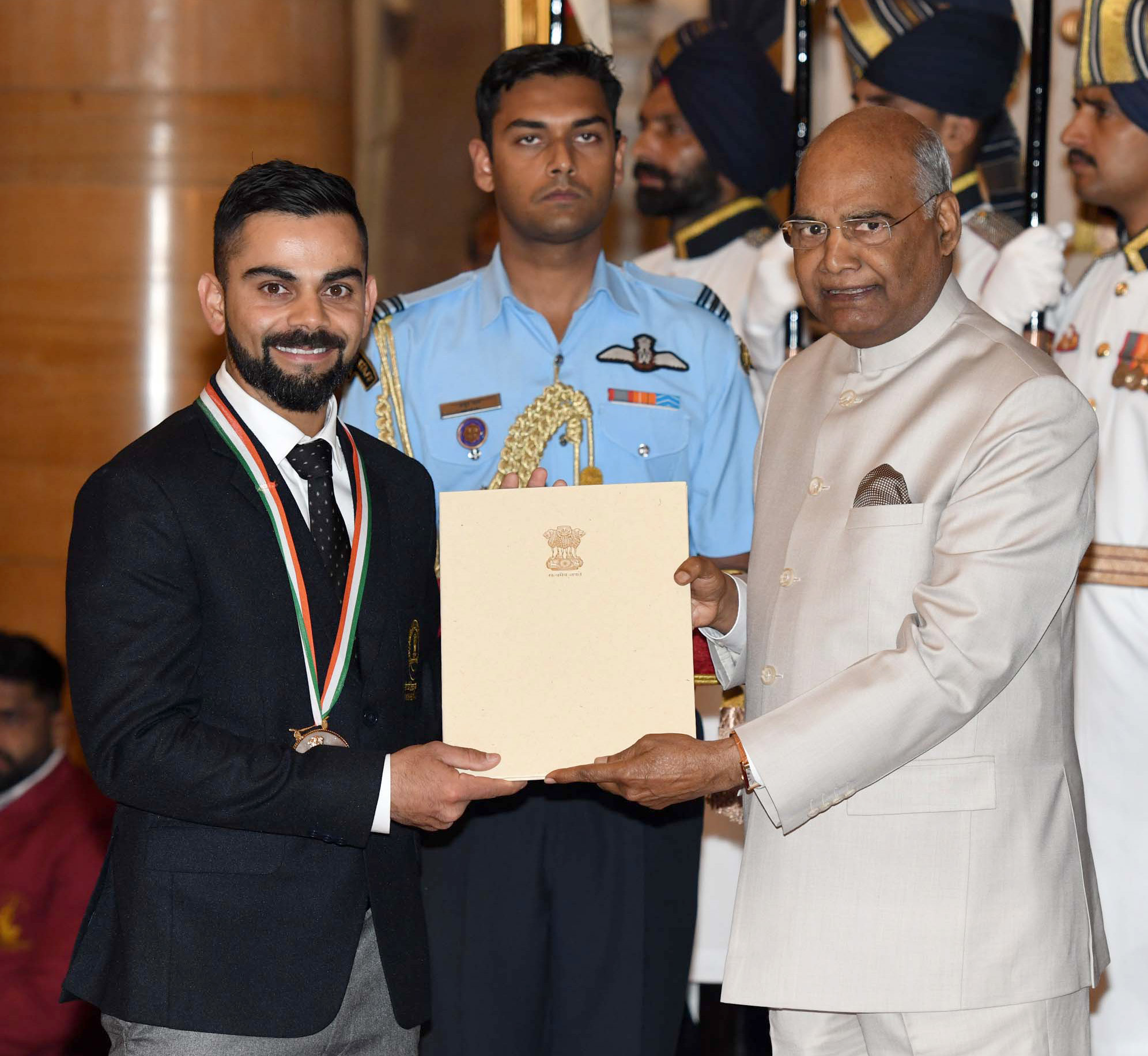
- Virat Kohli receiving Khel Ratna Award in 2018
- Awarded for: Sporting excellence
- Sponsored by: Government of India
- Venue: Rashtrapati Bhavan, New Delhi
- Country: India
- Presented by: President of India
- Eligibility: Indian sportsperson
- Hosted by: Ministry of Youth Affairs and Sports
- Formerly called: Rajiv Gandhi Khel Ratna Award (1992–2021)
- Rewards: ₹25 lakh (US$27,000) and a medallion
- Status: In force
- Established: 1992
- First award: 1991–92
- Final award: 2024
- Most recent winner: Gukesh Dommaraju; Harmanpreet Singh; Praveen Kumar; Manu Bhaker

Highlights
- Total awarded: 62
- First winner: Viswanathan Anand

Precedence
- Next (lower): Arjuna Award

The Khel Ratna Award (Hindi pronunciation: [kʰeːl rət̪nə]; transl. Sport Jewel Award), officially known as the Major Dhyan Chand Khel Ratna Award, formerly known as the Rajiv Gandhi Khel Ratna Award, is the highest sporting honour of India. It is awarded annually by the Ministry of Youth Affairs and Sports, Government of India.

Recipients are selected by a committee constituted by the Ministry and honoured for their "spectacular and most outstanding performance in the field of sports over a period of four years" at an international level. As of 2020, the award comprises a medallion, a certificate, and a cash prize of ₹25 lakh (US$27,000). (Note: The cash prize was revised from ₹1 lakh (US$1,100) to ₹3 lakh (US$3,200) in 2000, to ₹5 lakh (US$5,300) in 2002, to ₹7.5 lakh (US$8,000) in 2009, and to ₹25 lakh (US$27,000) in 2020.)

Instituted in 1991–1992, the award was given for the performance by a sportsperson in a year. Based on the suggestions provided by 2014 award selection committee, the Ministry revised the criteria in February 2015 to consider the performance over a period of four years. The nominations for a given year are accepted till 30 April or last working day of April with not more than two sportspersons nominated for each sports discipline. A twelve-member committee evaluates the performances of a sportsperson at various international events which include the Olympic Games, Paralympic Games, Asian Games, and Commonwealth Games. The committee later submits its recommendations to the Union Minister of Youth Affairs and Sports for further approval.

From 1991 to 2021, the award was named after Rajiv Gandhi (1944–1991), the 6th Prime Minister of India. On August 6, 2021, the government of India renamed the award after Major Dhyan Chand (1905–1979), an Indian field hockey player, widely regarded as one of the greatest field hockey players of all time, who scored more than 1000 goals over a 20-year career from 1926 to 1948. While announcing the renaming of the award, the Indian Prime Minister Narendra Modi claimed that he was responding to "many requests from citizens across India."

The first recipient of the award was chess Grandmaster Viswanathan Anand, who was honoured for the performance in the year 1991–1992. In 2001, sport shooter Abhinav Bindra, then aged 18, became the youngest recipient of the award.

Usually conferred upon only one sportsperson in a year, a few exceptions have been made (1993–1994, 2002, 2009, 2012, 2016–2021 and 2024) when multiple recipients were awarded in a year.

As of 2024, there have been 62 recipients across sixteen sport disciplines: athletics, badminton, billiards, boxing, chess, cricket, field hockey, football, gymnastics, para-athletics, para-badminton, para-shooting, shooting, snooker, table tennis, tennis, wrestling, weightlifting, and yacht racing.

== Nominations ==
The nominations for the award are received from all government recognised National Sports Federations, the Indian Olympic Association, the Sports Authority of India (SAI), the Sports Promotion and Control Boards, and the state and the union territory governments with not more than two eligible sportspersons nominated for each sports discipline. In case of cricket, the nominations are received from the Board of Control for Cricket in India and SAI is authorised to submit the nominations on behalf of all the de-recognised or under suspension National Sports Federations. (Note: For cricket, there is no National Sports Federation recognised by the Government.) The previous award recipients can also nominate one sportsperson for the discipline for which they themselves were awarded. The Government can nominate up to two sportspersons in deserving cases where no such nominations have been received from the nominating authorities. The nominations for a given year are accepted till 30 April or last working day of April.

== Selection process ==
All the received nominations are sent to SAI and National Anti-Doping Agency for the verification against the claimed achievements and doping clearance respectively. Any sportsperson who is either penalised or being enquired for usage of drugs or substances banned by the World Anti-Doping Agency is not eligible for the award. A committee consisting of the Joint Secretary and the Director/Deputy Secretary of Department of Sports, the Secretary and the Executive Director/Director (TEAMS) of SAI verify and validate the nominations.

The valid nominations are placed before the selection committee constituted by the Government. This twelve member committee consists of a chairperson nominated by the Ministry, four Olympians or previous recipients of Khel Ratna or Arjuna Award, three sports journalists/experts/commentators, one sportsperson/expert/administrator associated with parasports, one sports administrator, the Director General of SAI, and the Joint Secretary of Department of Sports, with no more than one sportsperson from a particular discipline included in the committee. When instituted in 1991–92, the award was given for the performance by a sportsperson in a year. Based on the suggestions provided by 2014 award selection committee headed by Kapil Dev, the Ministry revised the criteria in February 2015 to consider the performance over a period of four years.

The medals won in various international championships and events of the disciplines which include Summer and Winter Olympic and Paralympics Games, Asian Games, and Commonwealth Games are given 80% weightage. The remaining 20% weightage is given to the profile and standard of the events. For any other games not included in Olympic, Asian Games, and Commonwealth Games like cricket and indigenous games, the individual's performance of a sportsperson is taken into consideration. The sportsperson with maximum points is given 80 marks. Rest of the sportspersons are given marks in proportion to the maximum points. For team events, marks are given as per the strength of the team. Following are the points defined for medals at the given events:

Points for winning medals for the performance during the last four years
| Event | Medal | | |
| Event | Gold | Silver | Bronze |
|---|---|---|---|
| Olympic Games/Paralympic Games | 80 | 70 | 55 |
| World Championship/World Cup (Note: A World Championship/World Cup is generally organised every four years. For different cyclicities, proportionate marks are given.) | 40 | 30 | 20 |
| Asian Games | 30 | 25 | 20 |
| Commonwealth Games | 25 | 20 | 15 |

For a given discipline, not more than two sportspersons, one male and one female, are given highest marks. The committee may not recommend the award to the sportsperson with the highest marks across disciplines but can only recommend the recipient of the highest aggregate marks in a particular sports discipline. The recommendations of the selection committee are submitted to the Union Minister of Youth Affairs and Sports for further approval.

== List of recipients ==
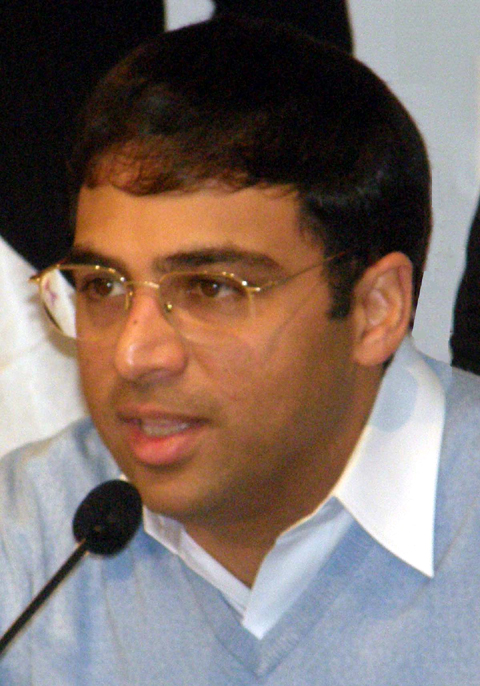
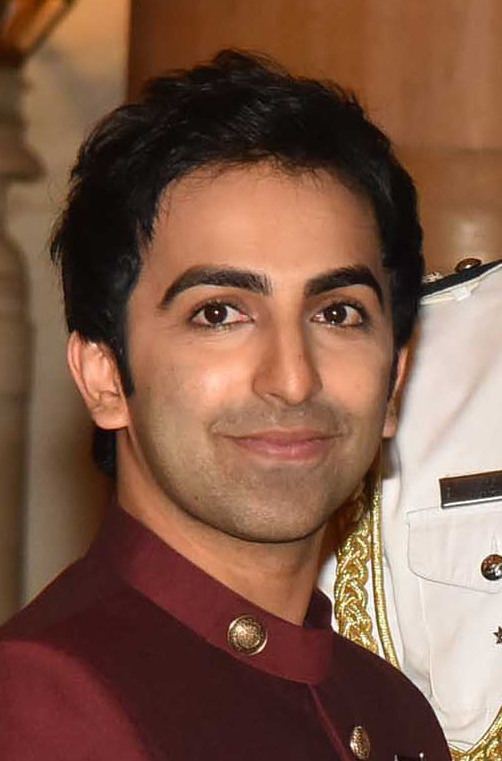
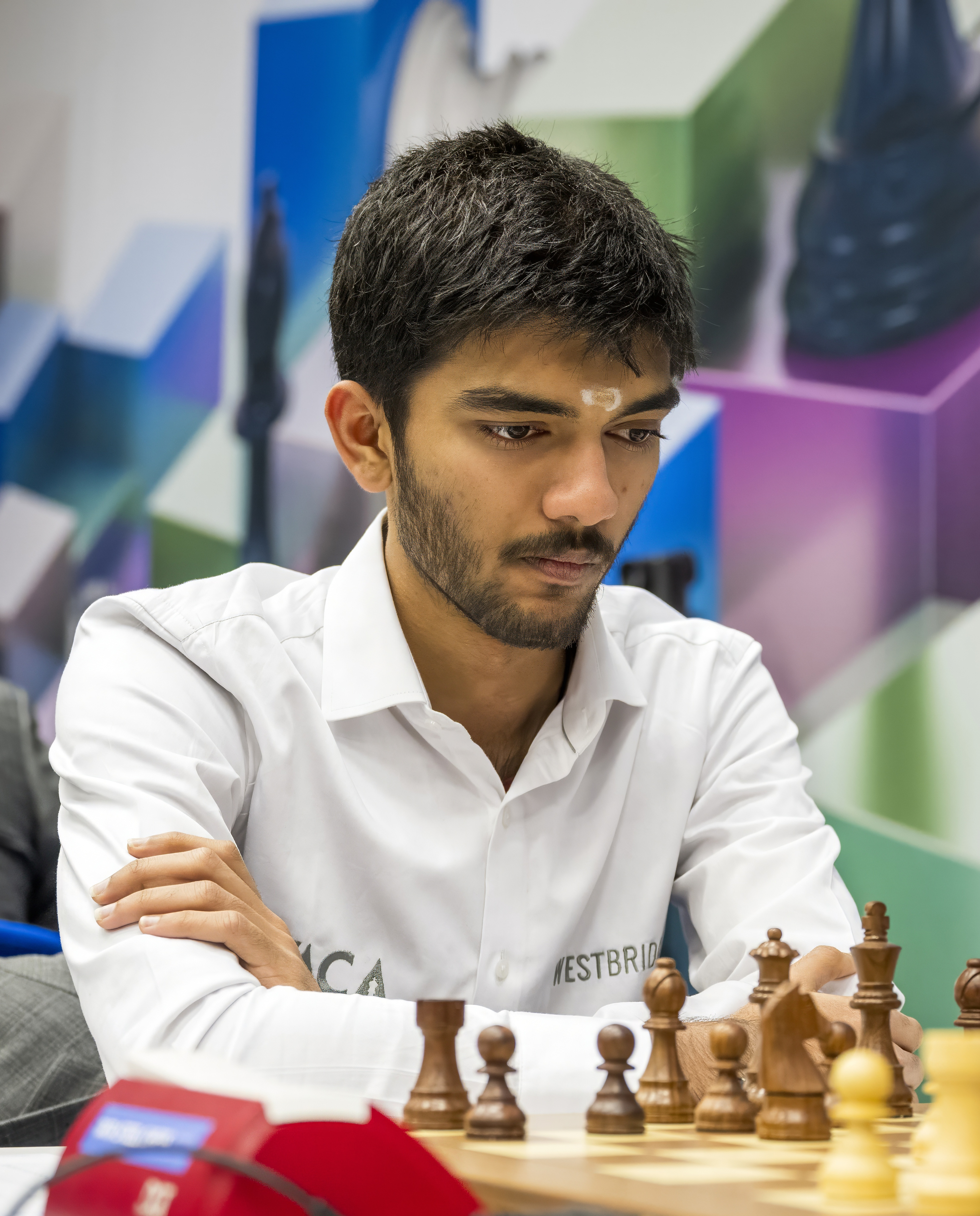
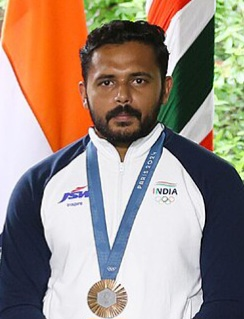
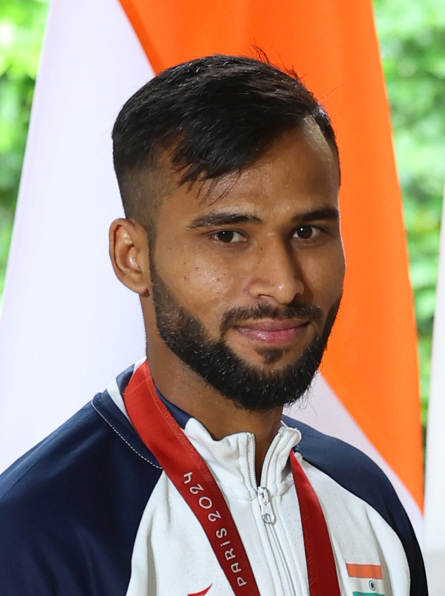
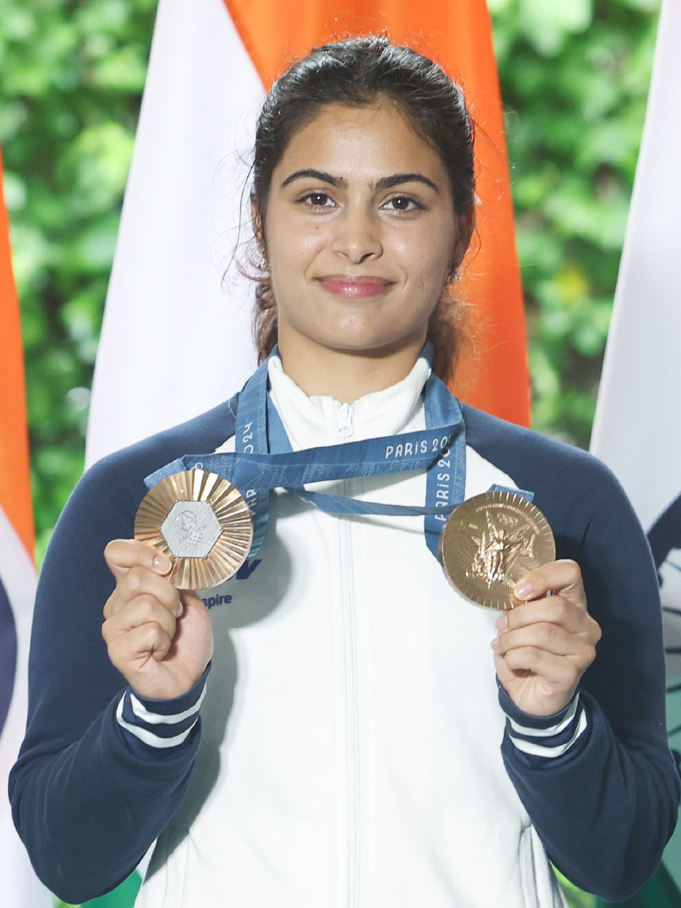
- Top left: The first recipient of the award Viswanathan Anand is the country's first chess Grandmaster and a five-time winner of World Chess Championship.
- Top centre: Pankaj Advani is the only sportsperson to have won the award for two sports disciplines: billiards and snooker.
- Top right: Most recent recipient (2024) – Gukesh Dommaraju for chess.
- Bottom left: Most recent recipient (2024) – Harmanpreet Singh for hockey.
- Bottom centre: Most recent recipient (2024) – Praveen Kumar for para athletics.
- Bottom right: Most recent recipient (2024) – Manu Bhaker for shooting.

Key
| # | Indicates a joint award for the given year |

List of award recipients, showing the year, and discipline(s)
| Year | Recipient(s) | Discipline(s) | Refs. |
|---|---|---|---|
| 1991–1992 | Viswanathan Anand | Chess | |
| 1992–1993 | Geet Sethi | Billiards | |
| 1993–1994 # | Homi Motivala | Yachting (Team event) | |
| 1993–1994 # | Pushpendra Kumar Garg | Yachting (Team event) | |
| 1994–1995 | Karnam Malleswari | Weightlifting | |
| 1995–1996 | Nameirakpam Kunjarani | Weightlifting | |
| 1996–1997 | Leander Paes | Tennis | |
| 1997–1998 | Sachin Tendulkar | Cricket | |
| 1998–1999 | Jyotirmoyee Sikdar | Athletics | |
| 1999–2000 | Dhanraj Pillay | Hockey | |
| 2000–2001 | Pullela Gopichand | Badminton | |
| 2001 | Abhinav Bindra | Shooting | |
| 2002 # | K. M. Beenamol | Athletics | |
| 2002 # | Anjali Bhagwat | Shooting | |
| 2003 | Anju Bobby George | Athletics | |
| 2004 | Rajyavardhan Singh Rathore | Shooting | |
| 2005 | Pankaj Advani | Billiards and Snooker | |
| 2006 | Manavjit Singh Sandhu | Shooting | |
| 2007 | Mahendra Singh Dhoni | Cricket | |
| 2008 | No award (Note: The award for the performance in 2008 is being referred to as award for 2009.) | | |
| 2009 # | Mary Kom | Boxing | |
| 2009 # | Vijender Singh | Boxing | |
| 2009 # | Sushil Kumar | Freestyle wrestling | |
| 2010 | Saina Nehwal | Badminton | |
| 2011 | Gagan Narang | Shooting | |
| 2012 # | Vijay Kumar | Shooting | |
| 2012 # | Yogeshwar Dutt | Freestyle wrestling | |
| 2013 | Ronjan Sodhi | Shooting | |
| 2014 | No award | | |
| 2015 | Sania Mirza | Tennis | |
| 2016 # | P. V. Sindhu | Badminton | |
| 2016 # | Dipa Karmakar | Gymnastics | |
| 2016 # | Jitu Rai | Shooting | |
| 2016 # | Sakshi Malik | Freestyle wrestling | |
| 2017 # | Devendra Jhajharia | Paralympic javelin | |
| 2017 # | Sardara Singh | Hockey | |
| 2018 # | Saikhom Mirabai Chanu | Weightlifting | |
| 2018 # | Virat Kohli | Cricket | |
| 2019 # | Deepa Malik | Paralympic (shot put, javelin, others) | |
| 2019 # | Bajrang Punia | Freestyle wrestling | |
| 2020 # | Rohit Sharma | Cricket | |
| 2020 # | Mariyappan Thangavelu | Paralympic high jump | |
| 2020 # | Manika Batra | Table tennis | |
| 2020 # | Vinesh Phogat | Freestyle wrestling | |
| 2020 # | Rani Rampal | Hockey | |
| 2021 # | Neeraj Chopra | Athletics | |
| 2021 # | Ravi Kumar Dahiya | Freestyle wrestling | |
| 2021 # | Lovlina Borgohain | Boxing | |
| 2021 # | P. R. Sreejesh | Hockey | |
| 2021 # | Avani Lekhara | Paralympic shooting | |
| 2021 # | Sumit Antil | Para-athletics | |
| 2021 # | Pramod Bhagat | Para-badminton | |
| 2021 # | Krishna Nagar | Para-badminton | |
| 2021 # | Manish Narwal | Paralympic shooting | |
| 2021 # | Mithali Raj | Cricket | |
| 2021 # | Sunil Chhetri | Football | |
| 2021 # | Manpreet Singh | Hockey | |
| 2022 | Sharath Kamal | Table tennis | |
| 2023 # | Chirag Shetty | Badminton | |
| 2023 # | Satwiksairaj Rankireddy | Badminton | |
| 2024 # | Gukesh Dommaraju | Chess | |
| 2024 # | Harmanpreet Singh | Hockey | |
| 2024 # | Praveen Kumar | Para-athletics | |
| 2024 # | Manu Bhaker | Shooting | |

== Controversies ==
The 2002 selection committee, headed by former football player Pradip Kumar Banerjee made twenty one recommendations for the Arjuna Award and two recommendations for the Major Dhyan Chand Khel Ratna Award (then known as the Rajiv Gandhi Khel Ratna Award), athlete K. M. Beenamol and shooter Anjali Bhagwat. The government rejected the recommendations and asked the committee to cut down the list to comply with the award guidelines, where only one sportsperson for the Major Dhyan Chand Khel Ratna Award and fifteen sportspersons along with one disabled athlete for the Arjuna Awards could be recommended each year. The committee revised the list to recommend Beenamol for the award over Bhagwat but also put a request "to consider everyone". The decision spurred criticism for ignoring the achievements of the shooter and Bhagwat and the National Rifle Association of India expressed their "disappointment" with the decision. Later, the government accepted all the recommendations "as an exception" and jointly awarded Beenamol and Bhagwat for the year 2002.

In August 2013, the selection committee, headed by Michael Ferreira recommended sport shooter Ronjan Sodhi for the award, with some committee members questioning the process of selection. A committee member noted that discus thrower Krishna Poonia and Paralympic athlete Girisha Nagarajegowda were shortlisted and Sodhi was not the initial choice. However, Girisha's name was removed, and the final voting was done between Sodhi and Poonia. Poonia was accused of lobbying for the award by one of the committee member Anjali Bhagwat, but the accused met the then Union Sports Minister Jitendra Singh to promote her case and also rubbished the lobbying allegations. The Ministry conducted a separate enquiry by Secretary of Department of Sports and decided not to increase the number of awards "to maintain the stature of the awards".

Following an announcement, in August 2015, that tennis player Sania Mirza was to be awarded, a Public-Interest Litigation was filed in the Karnataka High Court. The petitioner, who was again Girisha, mentioned that his performance was ignored by the committee. Girisha claimed to be a top contender for the award with 90 points, owing to his silver medal-winning act at the 2012 Summer Paralympics in the Men's High Jump F42 event. The petition mentioned that the points for Mirza's Grand Slam titles from 2011 until 2015 should not be counted as the events were not a part of the list of sports events to be considered for the performance evaluation. (Note: Mirza has won 2012 French Open – Mixed Doubles with Mahesh Bhupathi, 2014 US Open – Mixed Doubles with Bruno Soares, and 2015 US Open – Women's Doubles and 2015 Wimbledon Championships – Women's Doubles with Martina Hingis.) The court withheld the conferment and sought replies from the Ministry about the selection process. The Ministry nevertheless presented the award to Mirza on 29 August 2015 amidst the case processing.
