= Arjuna Award =

Indian sports award

- Civilian award for outstanding contributions to Sports (Individual/Team)
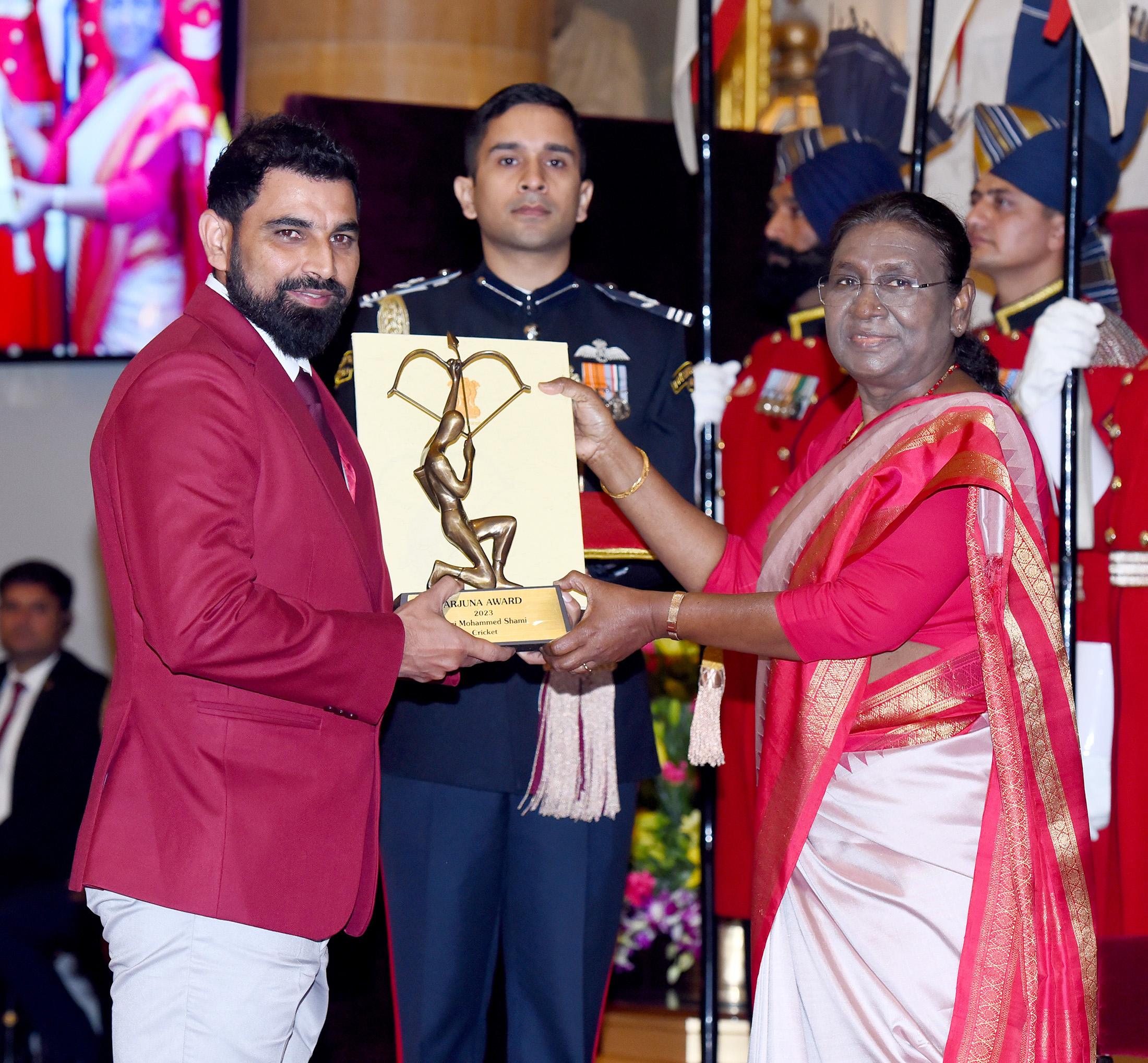
- Mohammed Shami receiving the Arjuna Award in 2024
- Awarded for: Sports honour in India
- Sponsored by: Government of India
- Reward: ₹15,00,000
- First award: 1961
- Final award: 2024

Highlights
- Total awarded: 967 individuals + 1 team award

Precedence
- Next (higher): Major Dhyan Chand Khel Ratna

Arjuna award recipients
Year	Number of recipients
1961–1969	95(+ 1 team award)
1970–1979	136
1980–1989	147
1990–1999	147
2000–2009	151
2010–2019	178
2020–2029	119

The Arjuna Award, officially known as Arjuna Awards given for Outstanding Performance in Sports and Games, is the second-highest sporting honour of India, the highest being the Major Dhyan Chand Khel Ratna Award. The award is named after Arjuna, one of the characters of the Sanskrit epic Mahabharata of ancient India. In Hinduism, he has been seen as a symbol of hard work, dedication and concentration. It is awarded annually by the Ministry of Youth Affairs and Sports. Before the introduction of the Major Dhyan Chand Khel Ratna in 1991–1992, the Arjuna award was the highest sporting honour of India. The nominations for the award are received from all government-recognised national sports federations, the Indian Olympic Association, the Sports Authority of India (SAI), the Sports Promotion and Control Boards, the state and the union territory governments and the Major Dhyan Chandra Khel Ratna, Arjuna, Dhyan Chand and Dronacharya awardees of the previous years. The recipients are selected by a committee constituted by the Ministry and are honoured for their "good performance in the field of sports over a period of four years" at the international level and for having shown "qualities of leadership, sportsmanship and a sense of discipline." As of 2020, the award comprises "a bronze statuette of Arjuna, certificate, ceremonial dress, and a cash prize of ₹15 lakh (US$16,000)." (Note: The cash prize was introduced in the year 1977–1978 as a scholarship of ₹200 (US$2.10) a month for 2 years. It was revised to one time cash prize of ₹5,000 (US$53) in 1986, to ₹20,000 (US$210) in 1987, to ₹50,000 (US$530) in 1993, to ₹1.5 lakh (US$1,600) in 1998, to ₹3 lakh (US$3,200) in 2001, to ₹5 lakh (US$5,300) in 2009, and to ₹15 lakh (US$16,000) in 2020.)

Instituted in 1961 to honour the outstanding sportspersons of the country, the award over the years has undergone a number of expansions, reviews and rationalizations. The award was expanded to include all the recognised sporting disciplines in 1977, introduced indigenous games and physically handicapped categories in 1995 and introduced a lifetime contribution category in 1995 leading to creation of a separate Dhyan Chand Award in 2002. The latest revision in 2018 stipulates that the award is given only to the disciplines included in the events like Olympic Games, Paralympic Games, Asian Games, Commonwealth Games, World Championship and World Cup along with cricket, indigenous games, and Parasports. It also recommends giving only fifteen awards in a year, relaxing in case of excellent performance in major multi-sport events, team sports, across gender and giving away of at least one award in the physically challenged category.

== History ==
Since the year 2001, the award is given only in disciplines falling under the following categories:

- Olympic Games / Asian Games / Commonwealth Games / World Cup / World Championship Disciplines and Cricket
- Indigenous Games
- Sports for the Physically Challenged

== Lists of recipients ==
=== By year ===
- Arjuna Award recipients (1961–1969)
- Arjuna Award recipients (1970–1979)
- Arjuna Award recipients (1980–1989)
- Arjuna Award recipients (1990–1999)
- Arjuna Award recipients (2000–2009)
- Arjuna Award recipients (2010–2019)
- Arjuna Award recipients (2020–2029)

=== By sport ===
==== Olympic sports ====
- Archery
- Athletics
- Badminton
- Basketball
- Boxing
- Cycling
- Equestrian
- Fencing
- Football
- Golf
- Gymnastics
- Hockey
- Judo
- Lawn Tennis
- Rowing
- Shooting
- Swimming
- Table Tennis
- Volleyball
- Weightlifting
- Winter Sports
- Wrestling

==== Non Olympic sports ====
- Adventure Sports
- Ball Badminton
- Billiards & Snooker
- Bodybuilding
- Carrom
- Chess
- Cricket
- Kabaddi
- Kho Kho
- Motor Sports
- Mountaineering
- Polo
- Powerlifting
- Roller Skating
- Squash
- Wushu
- Yachting

==== Parasports ====
- Parasports
