= Moraad Ali Khan =

Indian sport shooter

Moraad Ali Khan (born 1961) is an Indian sports shooter who is widely credited for putting India on the world shooting map.

He is a descendant of the Sayyid brothers, who were known as the "King Makers" in Indian history. The family moved to Jansath in Muzaffarnagar, Uttar Pradesh after the demise of the kingmakers.

== Biography ==
He was awarded the Arjuna award in 1996 and won a gold medal at the Manchester Commonwealth Games as well as many other international medals at Asian and world level competitions. He has also been the National Champion of India seven times. He was the member of the shooting team that won the first ever team gold for India in any shooting event in 1995 at Chengdu, China. In the same Trap Shooting event, the team of Moraad Ali Khan, Mansher Singh & Manavjit Singh Sandhu created a new Asian Record. He was also the first shooter to represent India along with Mansher Singh at a World Cup Competition in Nicosia, Cyprus in 1995. He is the only shooter from India who has won international medals in both Trap as well as Double Trap Shooting.

Moraad Ali Khan worked in Tata Steel & Tata Teleservices for 25 years in various positions. He started competitive shooting at the age of 31 and retired in 2006 after winning the National Shooting Championship.

Moraad also produced a sports drama romance film titled Khwaabb, directed by his son Zaid.

=== Government ===
He also held various positions in government as well as professional organizations.

- Member, Governing Body, Sports Authority of India
- Member, Governing Body, National Dope Testing Laboratory
- Member, Target Olympic Podium Committee of Ministry of Youth Affairs & Sports, Government of India
- Chairman, Athletes Commission, National Rifle Association of India
- Ex Government Observer, Ministry of Youth Affairs and Sports, Government of India
- Ex Member, Athletes Commission of the International Sports Shooting Federation, the first Indian to ever be on the International Athletes Commission.
- Member disciplinary Panel, National Anti Doping Agency.
