= RGNIYD Regional Centre (Chandigarh) =

Rajiv Gandhi National Institute of Youth Development, Regional Centre, Chandigarh
- Type: Public university
- Established: 2014
- Academic affiliations: [Ministry of Youth Affairs and Sports, Government of India]
- Location: Chandigarh, India
- Campus: Urban
- Nicknames: RGNIYD. Regional Centre, Chandigarh
- Website: rgniyd.gov.in

The Rajiv Gandhi National Institute of Youth Development (RGNIYD), Regional Centre, Chandigarh was established in 2014 in city of Chandigarh. The Regional Centre is part of its parent institution Rajiv Gandhi National Institute of Youth Development located at Sriperumbudur, Tamil Nadu, India, which is an Institute of National Importance by an Act of Parliament no. 35/2012 under the Ministry of Youth Affairs & Sports, Government of India and a Deemed University declared under Section 3 of the UGC Act, 1956.

== Campus ==
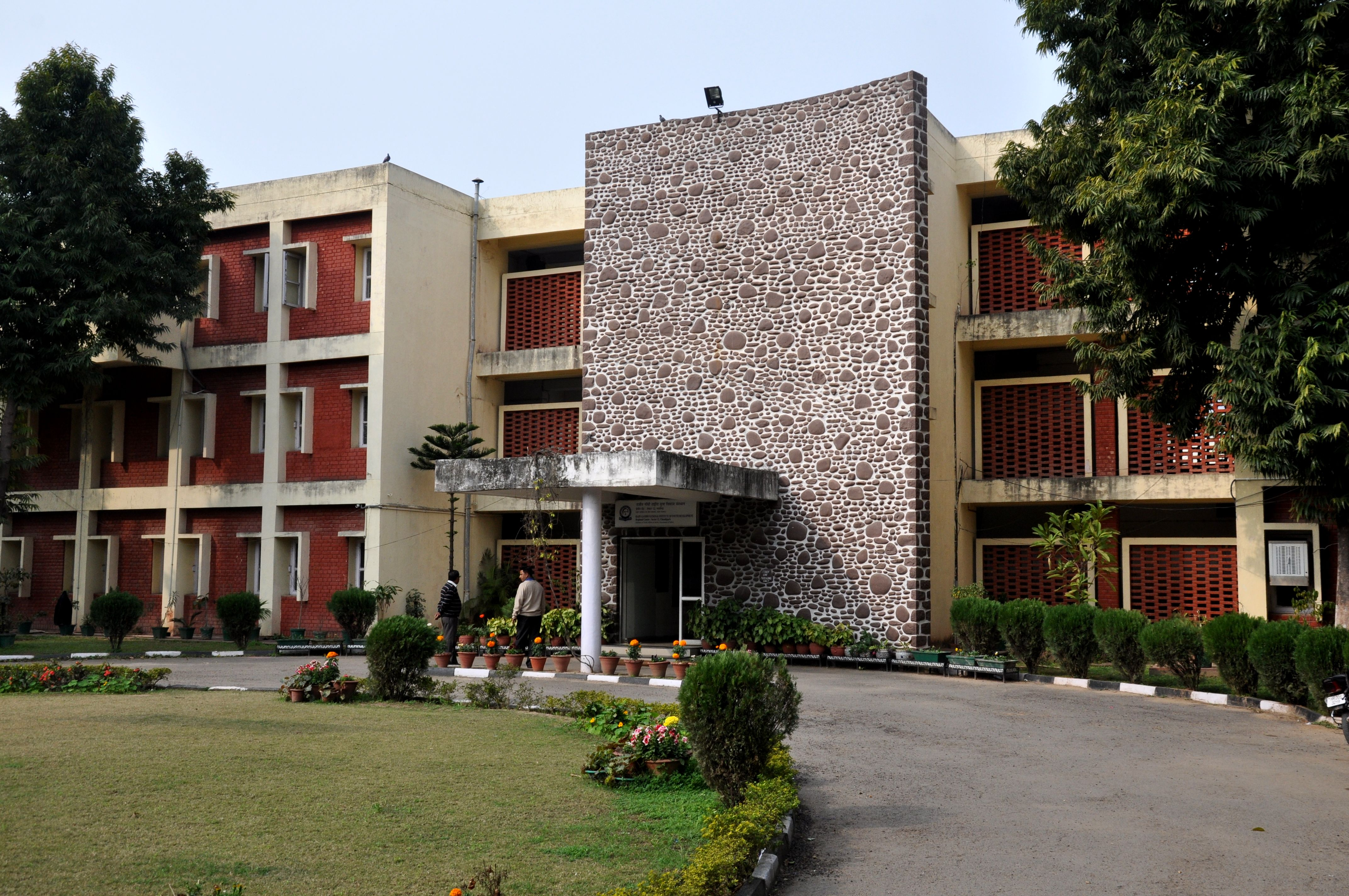
RGNIYD Regional Centre campus building

The Regional Centre campus is on a campus of 11 acres of Sector 12 in the city of Chandigarh. The campus is adjacent to a medical institution known as the Postgraduate Institute of Medical Education and Research.

== Key functions ==
RGNIYD, Regional Centre, Chandigarh offers courses in the following areas through training, workshops and consultancy:

- Formulation of Youth Policies and Programmes
- Training of Trainers/Capacity Building
- Preparation of Core Training Material and Facilitators’ Manuals
- Enhancing Employability Skills of Youth
- Implementing Skill Development Programmes
- Monitoring and Evaluation Studies
- Client-based and Demand-driven Training Programmes
- Academic Programmes in Youth Work
- Organizing Seminars on Youth Work
- Study and Exposure Visits
- Professional Development Programmes for Government official and International organizations

== Skill development programmes ==
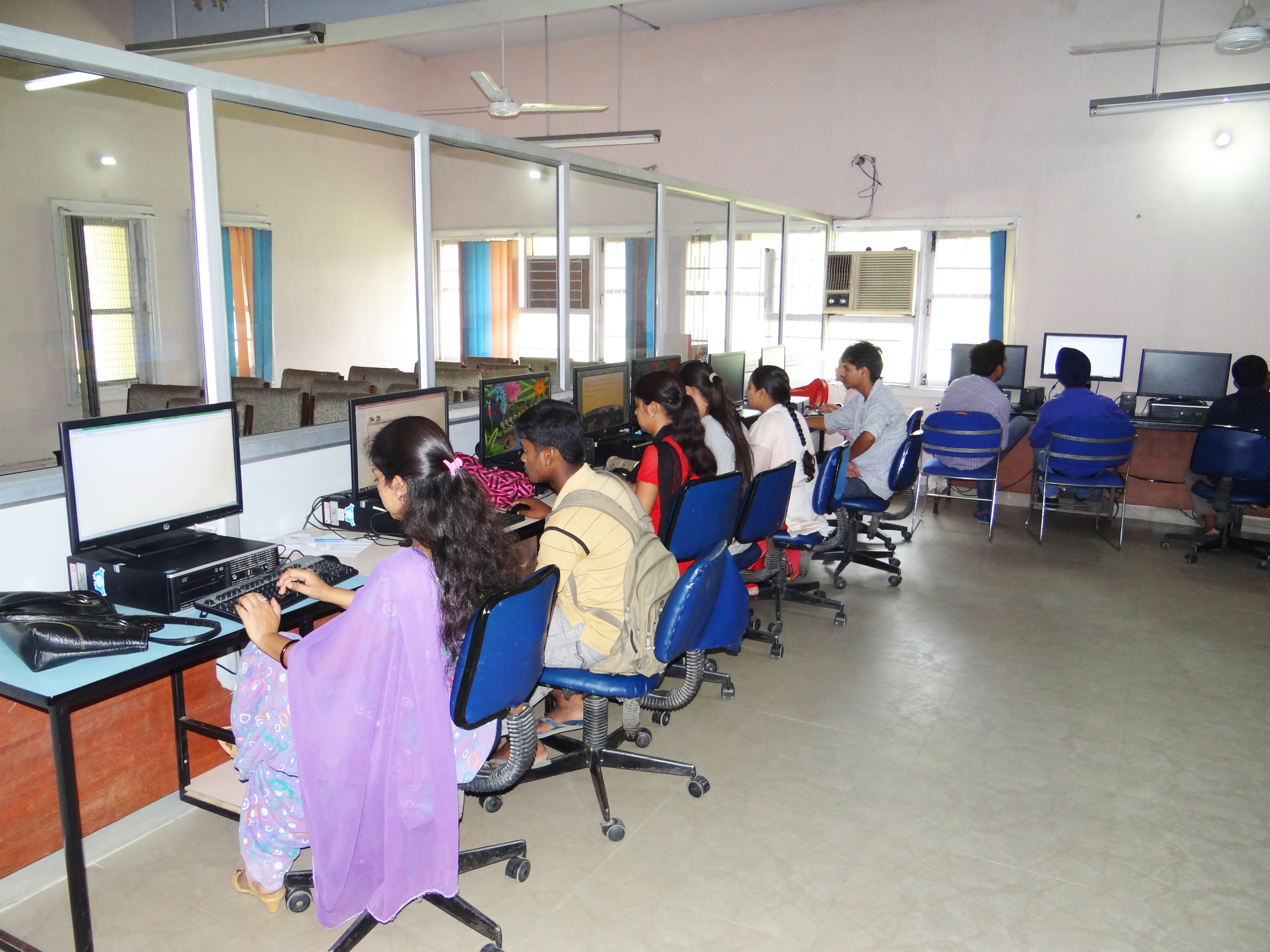
Skill Development Training at RGNIYD Regional centre Chandigarh

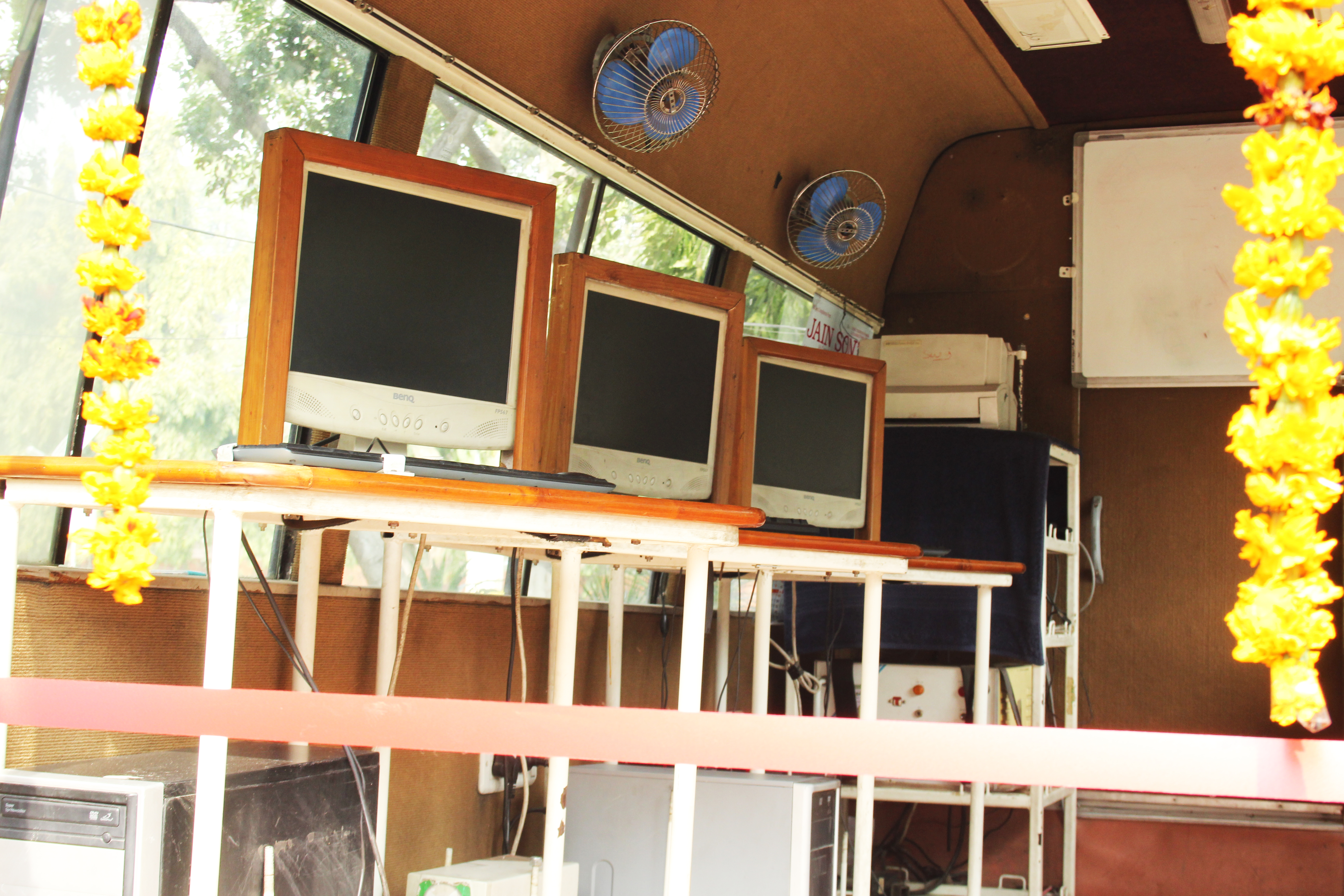
Skill Development Computer Enabled Bus at RGNIYD Regional Centre Chandigarh

RGNIYD, Regional Centre, Chandigarh runs demand-driven and job-oriented skill development programmes through its state-of-the-art Information Technology Lab and computer equipped bus under the aegis of Ministry of Youth Affairs and Sports, Government of India and with the support of State Urban Poverty Alleviation Cell (Municipal Corporation Chandigarh) to empower them for the access of employment opportunities.

The Skill Development Programme has benefited more than 700 poor youth through computer education and personality development for eight months and is provided with toolkits which includes bags, T-shirts and books.
