= Anuj Sharma (singer) =

Indian playback singer

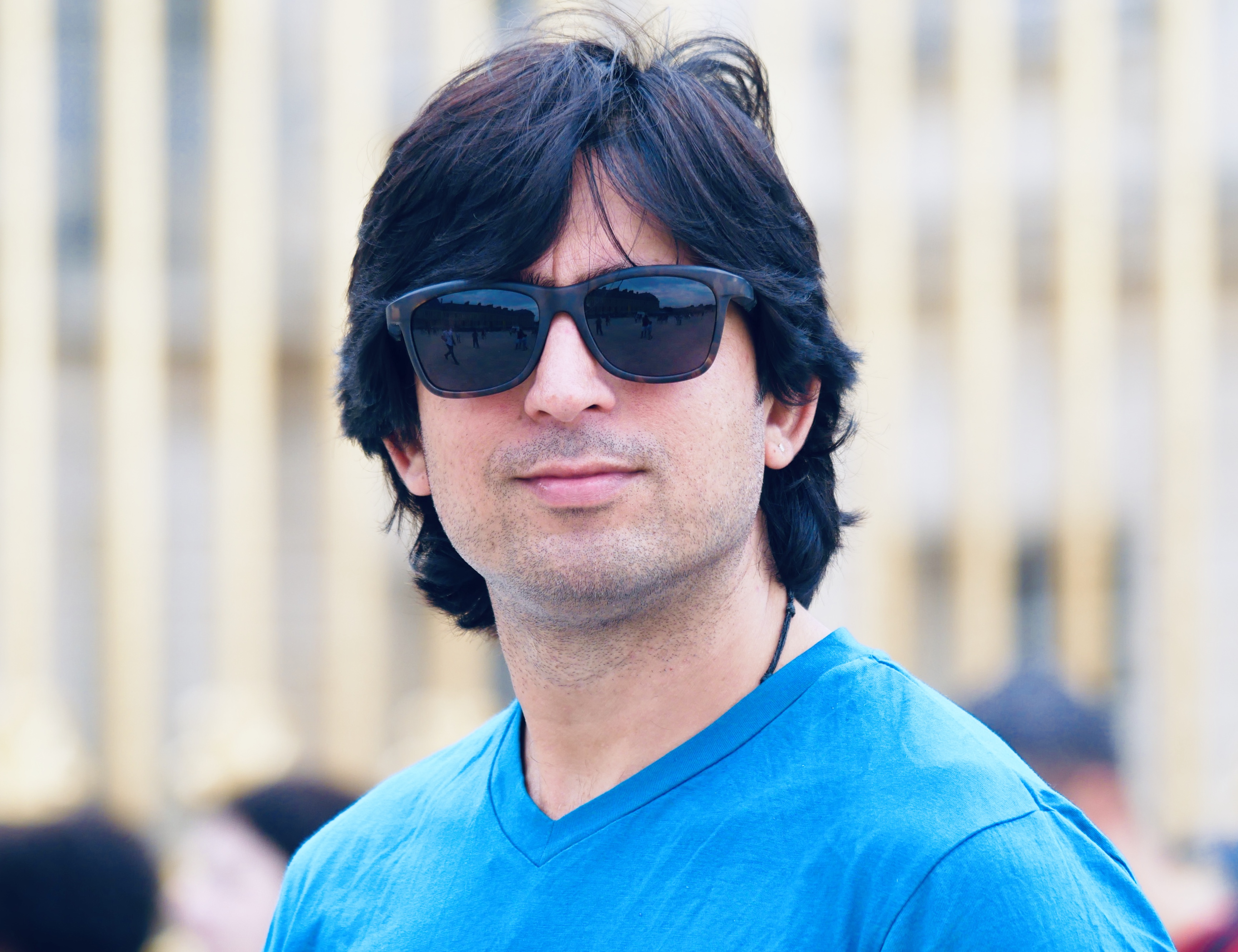

Background information
- Born: Rehan, Himachal Pradesh, India
- Genres: Filmi, Himachali
- Occupations: Singer, Actor, Music director
- Instrument: Vocals
- Years active: 1996–present

Anuj Sharma is an Indian playback singer from the town of Rehan, Himachal Pradesh. He predominantly works in Bollywood films and Himachali folk songs.

Sharma had begun his career while recording a Himachali Folk album in late 1996. Since then he has recorded more than 40 albums of Himachali folk songs for a number of recording companies. He was among the final three in Indian Idol, India's version of Pop Idol. Since Indian Idol, he has delivered a variety of critically acclaimed live performances in India and abroad. He had also received awards from a number of organisations.

== Indian Idol ==
Anuj Sharma is an Indian singer who was the Runner up in the second season of Indian Idol. Sharma had a passion for singing since childhood. His rise to fame is attributed to his performances in the Indian Idol.

The judges for the Second season were Anu Malik, Sonu Nigam and Farah Khan. The Second season was hosted by Aman Verma and Mini Mathur. The second season aired on Sony Entertainment Television from 21 November 2005 to 22 April 2006. The winner was Sandeep Acharya. His first solo album Khwaab was released by Universal Music on 25 February 2010.

== Education ==
Sharma was born in Rehan, India. He attended the Government Senior Secondary School Rehan for primary and secondary level education. He joined Wajir Ram Sing Government College Dehri as a music student, where he started learning basic music. Sharma was a good singer in childhood and won the best singer award in an inter-college competition at Himachal Pradesh University during his first year in college. He became famous in Himachal Pradesh with some Himachali folk albums during his bachelor's degree in music. After finishing his bachelor's degree, Sharma took his Masters in music at Guru Nanak Dev University, Amritsar, where he continued to win competitions. He also recorded more Himachali folk albums. He also took a Diploma of Music Recordist at Media Mates in Delhi after his university studies.

== Career ==
Sharma used to sing for his friends and relatives in his childhood days but his true musical learning was when he took his bachelor's degree. He soon became involved with some professionals which resulted in his first folk album Rat Payee Gume De Naale' with T-Series in 1996. Sharma released more than 20 albums within the next three to five years and started working with "All India Radio" Shimla where he sang number of times.

Following his Bachelor in Music degree, Sharma joined Guru Nanak Dev University for Master of Music and won a number of prizes in inter-university and within university competitions. After completion of his Masters in 2000, he joined as a lecturer in music at the same college from which he had graduated. He worked there for three years before moving to New Delhi where he did diploma in Music Recording. He was interviewed during his music recording course, on Radiocity 91 FM, where he show his talent of remixing. After finishing his diploma, Sharma set up his own studio and started arranging music for some Himachali Songs and sang in the first Himachali feature film (Fulmu Ranju).

Sharma appeared in the Indian Idol 2 competition and reached the last 28 singing "Tuje Dil Main Basa to Loon par Payar Jaroori Hai" in the Piano Round to reach the last 12. He lost in that round but the judges brought him back because of his performance in the Gala Round. This time, he moved up to number 3 before exiting. For the last three and half years after his Indian Idol fame, Sharma has become an icon for Himachalis.

== Album ==
- Khwaab Released by *Universal Music
- Jaaniya (Album Version)
- Keh do (Album Version)
- Zahir karon (Album Version)
- Rabba yaar Di (Album Version)
- Yaar Bina (Album Version)
- Jaaniya (Revisited) (Remix version)
- Khwaab (Revisited) (Remix version
- Tera Mitha Mitha Hasna and Sabke Sath Hain Bhole is Released By *R Music 2020

== Playback ==
- Missing on a Weekend "Kuch hone wala hai"
- Aisi Deewangi (upcoming movie)

=== Film song ===
- Missing on a weekend (2016) – "Kuch Hone Wala Hai"

== New albums ==
- Tera Mitha Mitha Hasna and SABKE SATH HAIN BHOLE In jan 2020.

== Discography ==
Sharma sang for Fulmu Ranjhu, a regional feature film released by Divya Himachal TV Production, Kangra, Himachal Pradesh.

A few of Sharma's folk albums:

- Rasliyan Dharan album and video released by Catrack Music Company
- Raat Payi Gume De Nale released by T-Series
- Apu Chala Nokiriya released by T-Series
- Baba Kuthu Basda released by T-Series
- Darshan Pana De released by T-Series
- Mere Ghar Ram Ayenge Bhakti sangeet album released by GMC
- Neelima Kangre Di album and video released by GMC
- Tera Mitha – Mitha Hasna album and video released by Mazie Audio Company
- Kand Pardesi released by SHAM MUSIC COMPANY
- Chail Gorian Hathan Di Mehandi released by Tridev Music Company
- Himachali Blast album and video released by GMC
