= Indian Association of Kickboxing Organisations =

National kickboxing federation

world Association of Kickboxing Organisations india
- Abbreviation: IAKO
- Formation: 1993
- Type: National Kickboxing Federation
- Legal status: Active (as per Govt. of India Societies Registration Act XXI of 1860)
- Purpose: Development and governance of the sport of kickboxing
- Headquarters: Odisha
- Location: Bhubaneswar, Odisha, India
- Region served: India
- Members: State association
- President: S S Harichandan (India)
- Website: www.wakoindia.org
- Remarks: Sports in India

Indian Association of Kickboxing Organisations (IAKO) is the national federation of kickboxing in India. IAKO was formed in 1993 to control and promote kickboxing activities throughout the country. IAKO promotes amateur kickboxing and professional kickboxing (under the banner of IAKO Pro) in all the states, union territories and special armed forces across the country.

IAKO is the first among other martial arts federations recognised by School Games Federation of India (SGFI) since 2005 and is instrumental in introducing kickboxing in school games since 2006.

== History of kickboxing in India ==
IAKO was first headquartered at Bhubaneswar, Odisha, in 1993. IAKO is a government-registered body under the Societies Registration Act XXI of 1860. IAKO represented WAKO in India as its national federation and under WAKO rules conducted the first national kickboxing championship in 1994 at Cuttack, Odisha. Kickboxing has been introduced into school and university games through IAKO.

Indian athletes have participated in Asian Games, Asian Indoor games, World championships, and World Martial Arts Games under the banner of IAKO and Indian Olympic Association. IAKO has its states' bodies to advance the sport and many of the IAKO state bodies have been recognised by the respective state Olympic association.

== Styles ==
=== Tatami sports ===
- Musical form
- Aerokickboxing
- Point fighting or semi contact
- Light contact
- Kick light

=== Ring sports ===
- Full contact
- Low kick
- K-1

== Achievements ==
- IAKO was granted authorisation of WAKO Pro in India and South Asian Kickboxing Organisation by Mr. Ennio Falsoni, World Association of Kickboxing Organizations (WAKO) president in 2004.
- IAKO is the first among other martial arts federations recognised by School Games Federation of India (SGFI) since 2005 and instrumental in introducing kickboxing in school games since 2006. And Association of Indian Universities (AIU) has become member of IAKO and included kickboxing in universities' games.
- IAKO represented by Er. Harichandan in the first ever anti doping seminar by the World Anti-Doping Agency (WADA) & National Anti-Doping Agency (NADA) in India on 6–7 October 2007 organised by MYAS, GOI & Sports Authority of India (SAI).
- Kickboxing has been included in the Asian Indoor Games since 2007, as a result Indian Olympic Association recognised kickboxing and IAKO as the national federation of kickboxing and send its team to take part in the Asian Indoor Games, Macau.
- WAKO President Dr. Ennio Falsoni along with his spouse and a world champion coach visited India during the "1st South Asian Kickboxing Referee Seminar" organised by WAKO South Asia held in Kolkata in the year 2008 in conjunction with IAKO 13th Sub Junior, 13th Junior & 14th Senior National Kickboxing Championship held on 5–10 August 2008 in SAI Sports Complex, Kolkata, West Bengal.
- Mr. Ennio Falsoni, overwhelmed by seeing the record breaking participation, was awarded the coveted WAKO 7th dan to Er. Harichandan, he appreciated the efforts of IAKO and Er. Harichandan for promoting and controlling WAKO India in right direction.
- IAKO team represented India for 1st Asian Martial Art Games of OCA on 1–9 August 2009 held at Bangkok, Thailand through Indian Olympic Association and received medals including a gold medal.
- Ministry of Youth Affairs & Sports, Govt. of India recognised kickboxing and the IAKO by sanctioning a kickboxing team through IOA to take part in the Asian Indoor Games 2009 in Vietnam.
- Manjeet Singh Nagil & Kuldeep Kumar own bronze medal for India in WAKO World Cup Kickboxing on 31 May TO 3 June 2012 – Italy.
