= Paralympic Charter =

Rules and guidelines for the Paralympic Games

The Paralympic Charter is the name given to a set of rules and regulations that bind the running of the Paralympic Games. It sets out the constitution of the International Paralympic Committee and other members of the Paralympic movement including national Paralympic committees and other sporting bodies.

The Paralympic Charter parallels the Olympic Charter.

Academic commentators have noted that the goals of the Paralympic movement expressed in the Charter and other key documentation are "vague" and not necessarily as clearly separated from the Olympic Charter as might be desirable.

== See also ==
- FIFA Disciplinary Code
- National Sports Governance Act, 2025
- List of international sport federations
