= Maa (1991 film) =

- Theatrical release poster
- Directed by: Ajay Kashyap
- Written by: Shyam Goel
- Produced by: Anuj Sharma
- Starring: Jeetendra; Jaya Prada
- Cinematography: K.V. Ramanna
- Edited by: Fruitee Glaadmaa
- Music by: Anu Malik
- Production company: Shatketan Associates
- Release date: 13 December 1991
- Running time: 141 minutes
- Country: India
- Language: Hindi

Maa (transl. Mother) is a 1991 Indian Hindi-language horror drama film, produced by Anuj Sharma under the Shatketan Associates banner and directed by Ajay Kashyap. It stars Jeetendra, Jaya Prada in the pivotal roles and music composed by Anu Malik..The movie was remade in Odia language as Matru Shakti (2003) starring Sidhanth Mohapatra.

== Plot ==
Ram Khanna is a wealthy industrialist with a trusting soul. Unknown to him, his elder brother Murli Manohar and his sister-in-law Maya are after his money. Their greed gets the better of them and they make an astrologer lie to him that a woman whose name starts with letter "M" will enter his life. As luck would have it, Ram spots a dancer named Mamta and is instantly smitten by her. What Ram doesn't know is that Mamta is the daughter of Heerabai, a prostitute. Ram learns Mamta's truth but is also convinced that Mamta's roots do not make her a bad person. Ram decides to marry Mamta, much to the chagrin of Murli and Maya. Ram weds Mamta and brings her home, where she slowly realizes the true nature of Murli and Maya, upon which Mamta takes control of Ram's life to thwart the duo. Later, Mamta gives birth to a baby boy, which makes the villains even more desperate.

One day, Ram gives Mamta a suitcase full of cash before leaving the town. Taking advantage of the situation, Murli and Maya hire a goon named Gullu Goli to kill Mamta. Gullu sees that Mamta and her son Munna are alone in the home. He tricks her out of the house and traps her. After brutally killing Mamta, Gullu hides her body in a secret location and steals the money. However, Mamta's ghost comes back, bent on revenge. Mamta soon finds out that Murli and Maya have taken control back in their hands. Everybody believes that Mamta fled with the money, abandoning her son and husband. Ram is unable to believe that Mamta could do this and drowns his sorrow in alcohol. Mamta is disheartened to see that Munna is the one who is suffering most. Only Dobby, the pet dog, is able to see Mamta, who is powerless. Despite being powerless, Mamta tries to do what she can.

One day Gullu Goli comes to Mamta's house. Mamta knows the true nature of Murli and Maya. Gullu Goli creates the idea that they must kill Munna by soaking him in the sun. While Mamta sends Dobby to save Munna, Dobby breaks out of an iron gate that he was caged in and saves Munna. Mamta tells Dobby the truth of Murli and Maya's evil idea. Dobby then goes to attack Murli and Maya. One day Murli tells Ram to go to Puna with Mona, Ram agrees and goes with Mona. Murli plans to kill Munna by starving him for 12 hours. Mamta's ghost wants to touch him, but she is unable. As Munna cries from hunger, Mamta goes to Mandir, where she is blessed with the power to touch everything and then saves Munna. Murli and Maya realize that Mamta's ghost is here. With the help of a Kaapalik (black magic practitioner), they trap Mamta. Happy that they are finally about to get what they sought out to get, the villains unwittingly spill all the beans in front of Ram and Mona. Now, it is revealed that Mona is actually an undercover cop brought to investigate the case. Mona explains that Mamta's sudden disappearance was found suspicious, which is why Mona went undercover and forged the friendship with the villains. It is also explained that Mona had already explained this to Ram, who was playing along. An enraged Ram attacks Murli, but the villains take him, Mona and Munna as prisoners. Ram is forced to sign over his property to Murli and Maya or Munna will be killed.

Here, Mamta is helplessly watching the drama, unable to escape the trap set by the Kapalik. She makes the Kapalik realize what he is doing. The Kapalik sets her free and grants her the power to avenge the wrongs. Here, the villains are about to kill Ram, Mona, and Munna, when Mamta appears and stops them. Realizing what has happened, the goons try to flee, but Mamta takes her revenge. Ram, who is still unable to see her, tries to talk to her. The Kapalik arrives on the scene and gives Ram the ability to see Mamta. Ram is happy to see her if only for one last time. He proclaims his love for her. Mamta too tells him that she knows everything and tells him to take care of Munna. With her purpose achieved, Mamta's soul is finally set free and she vanishes.

== Cast ==
- Jeetendra as Ram Khanna
- Jaya Prada as Mamta Khanna
- Aruna Irani as Maya Khanna
- Shakti Kapoor as Murli Manohar Khanna
- Kader Khan as CBI Officer Ravikant
- Gulshan Grover as Gullu Goli
- Birbal as Hotel Manager
- Viju Khote as the Cook
- Guddi Maruti as Julie
- Ishrat Ali as Sajan
- Sushma Seth as Heerabai
- Sahila Chadha as Mona
- Chandrashekhar as Temple Priest
- B. M. Vyas as Shaktimaan Baba
- Dobby as Dog

== Soundtrack ==
The music was composed by Anu Malik, The lyrics were written by Dev Kohli, Ikram Rajasthani, Rani Malik, Hasrat Jaipuri. Most popular song in album "Aaine Ke Sau Tukde" sang by Kumar Sanu.

#	Song	Singer
1.	"Aaine Ke Sau Tukde"	Kumar Sanu
2.	"Chanda Ne Di Chandni"	Kumar Sanu, Kavita Krishnamurthy
3.	"Barsaat Mein Jab Aayega"	Poornima
4.	"Maa Hi Mandir Maa Hi Pooja"	Mohammed Aziz
5.	"Anjan Ki Seeti"	Anu Malik, Alka Yagnik
