= Paralympic Games =

Major international sport event for people with disabilities

- Frequency: Every four years, alternated two years during the four-year cycle
- Inaugurated: Summer; Rome, Italy, in 1960; Winter; Örnsköldsvik, Sweden, in 1976
- President: Andrew Parsons
- Headquarters: Bonn, Germany

The Paralympic Games or Paralympics is a periodic series of international multisport events involving athletes with a range of disabilities. There are Winter and Summer Paralympic Games, which since the 1988 Summer Olympics in Seoul, South Korea, have been held shortly after the corresponding Olympic Games. All Paralympic Games are governed by the International Paralympic Committee (IPC).

The Paralympics began as a small gathering of British World War II veterans in 1948. The 1960 Games in Rome drew 400 athletes with disabilities from 23 countries, as proposed by doctor Antonio Maglio. Currently it is one of the largest international sporting events -- the 2020 Summer Paralympics featured 4,520 athletes from 163 National Paralympic Committees.

The Paralympic Games are organized in parallel with and in a similar way to the Olympic Games. The IOC-recognized Special Olympics World Games include athletes with intellectual disabilities (although since 1992, people with intellectual disabilities also participate in the Paralympic Games), and the Deaflympics held since 1924 are exclusive for deaf athletes.

Given the wide variety of disabilities of Para athletes, there are several categories in which they compete. The allowable disabilities are divided into ten eligible impairment types: impaired muscle power, impaired passive range of movement, limb deficiency, leg length difference, short stature, hypertonia, ataxia, athetosis, vision impairment and intellectual impairment. These categories are further divided into various subcategories.

== Forerunners ==
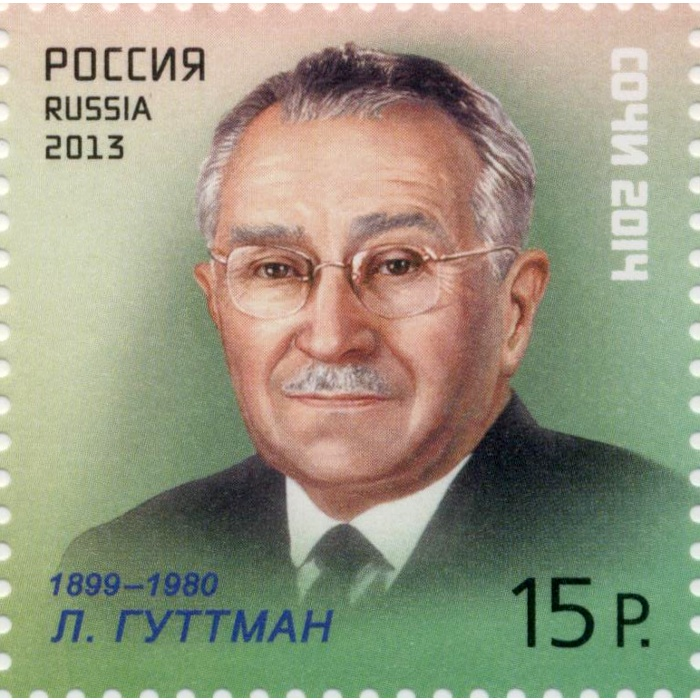
Sir Ludwig Guttmann

=== Athletes with disabilities at the Olympic Games ===
Athletes with disabilities did compete at the Olympic Games prior to the advent of the Paralympics. The first athlete to do so was German-American gymnast George Eyser in 1904, who had one artificial leg. Olivér Halassy, a Hungarian amputee water polo player, competed in three successive Olympic Games, beginning in 1928. Hungarian Károly Takács competed in shooting events in both the 1948 and 1952 Summer Olympics. He was a right-arm amputee and could shoot left-handed. Another athlete with a disability who appeared in the Olympics prior to the Paralympic Games was Lis Hartel, a Danish equestrian athlete who had contracted polio in 1943 and won a silver medal in the dressage event in the 1952 Summer Olympics.

=== Stoke Mandeville Games ===
The first organized athletic event for athletes with disabilities that coincided with the Olympic Games took place on the day of the opening of the 1948 Summer Olympics in London. The German-Jewish doctor Ludwig Guttmann, of Stoke Mandeville Hospital, who had fled Nazi Germany with the help of the Council for Assisting Refugee Academics (CARA) in 1939, hosted a sports competition for British World War II veteran patients with spinal cord injuries. The first games were called the 1948 International Wheelchair Games, and were intended to coincide with the 1948 Olympics. Guttman's aim was to create an elite sports competition for people with disabilities that would be equivalent to the Olympic Games. The games were held at the same location each year, and in 1952 Dutch and Israeli veterans took part alongside the British, making it the first international competition of its own kind. In 1960, the 9th annual games took place outside of the UK for the first time in Rome, to coincide with the 1960 Summer Olympics which were also being held in Rome. These were to be later designated the 1st Paralympic Games.

These early competitions have been described as the precursors of the Paralympic Games, and Stoke Mandeville holds a similar place in the history of the Paralympic movement as Greece holds in the Olympic Games; since 2012, the Paralympic flame has incorporated a "heritage flame" lit at Stoke Mandeville, although it was combined with flames lit in the host country for the formal start of the torch relay. Beginning in 2024, future Paralympic torch relays will officially begin in Stoke Mandeville, as an equivalent to the Olympic flame being created in Olympia.

== Milestones ==
There have been several milestones in the Paralympic movement. The first official Paralympic Games, coincident with the ninth Stoke Mandeville Games but no longer open solely to war veterans, was held in Rome in 1960. They were the brainchild of Antonio Maglio, a friend and follower of Guttmann and were financed almost entirely by Maglio's employer, the Workers National Accident Insurance Fund of Italy, then led by Renato Morelli, who was also Chairman of the International Social Security Association. Four hundred athletes from 23 countries competed at the 1960 Games. Since 1960, the Paralympic Games have taken place in the same year as the Olympic Games. The Games were initially open only to athletes in wheelchairs; at the 1976 Summer Games, athletes with different disabilities were included for the first time at a Summer Paralympics. With the inclusion of more disability classifications the 1976 Summer Games expanded to 1,600 athletes from 40 countries.

The 1988 Summer Paralympics in Seoul was another milestone for the Paralympic movement. It was in Seoul that the Paralympic Summer Games were held directly after the 1988 Summer Olympics, in the same host city, and using the majority of the venues. This set a precedent that was followed in 1992, 1996 and 2000. It was eventually formalized in an agreement between the International Paralympic Committee (IPC) and the International Olympic Committee (IOC) in 2001, and was extended through 2020. On 10 March 2018, the two committees further extended their contract to 2032. Despite being held in the same region, the 1992 Winter Paralympics used different competition venues than those used for the Olympic Games. 1994 Winter Paralympics were the first Winter Games to use the same venues and had the same Organizing Committee as the Winter Olympics.

== Winter Games ==
The first Winter Paralympic Games were held in 1976 in Örnsköldsvik, Sweden. This was the first Paralympics in which multiple categories of athletes with disabilities could compete. The Winter Games were celebrated every four years on the same year as their summer counterpart, just as the Olympics were. This tradition was upheld through the 1992 Games in Albertville, France; after that, beginning with the 1994 Games, the Winter Paralympics and the Winter Olympics have been held in those even-numbered years separate from the Summer Olympics. The winter games happen two years after the summer games.

== International Paralympic Committee ==
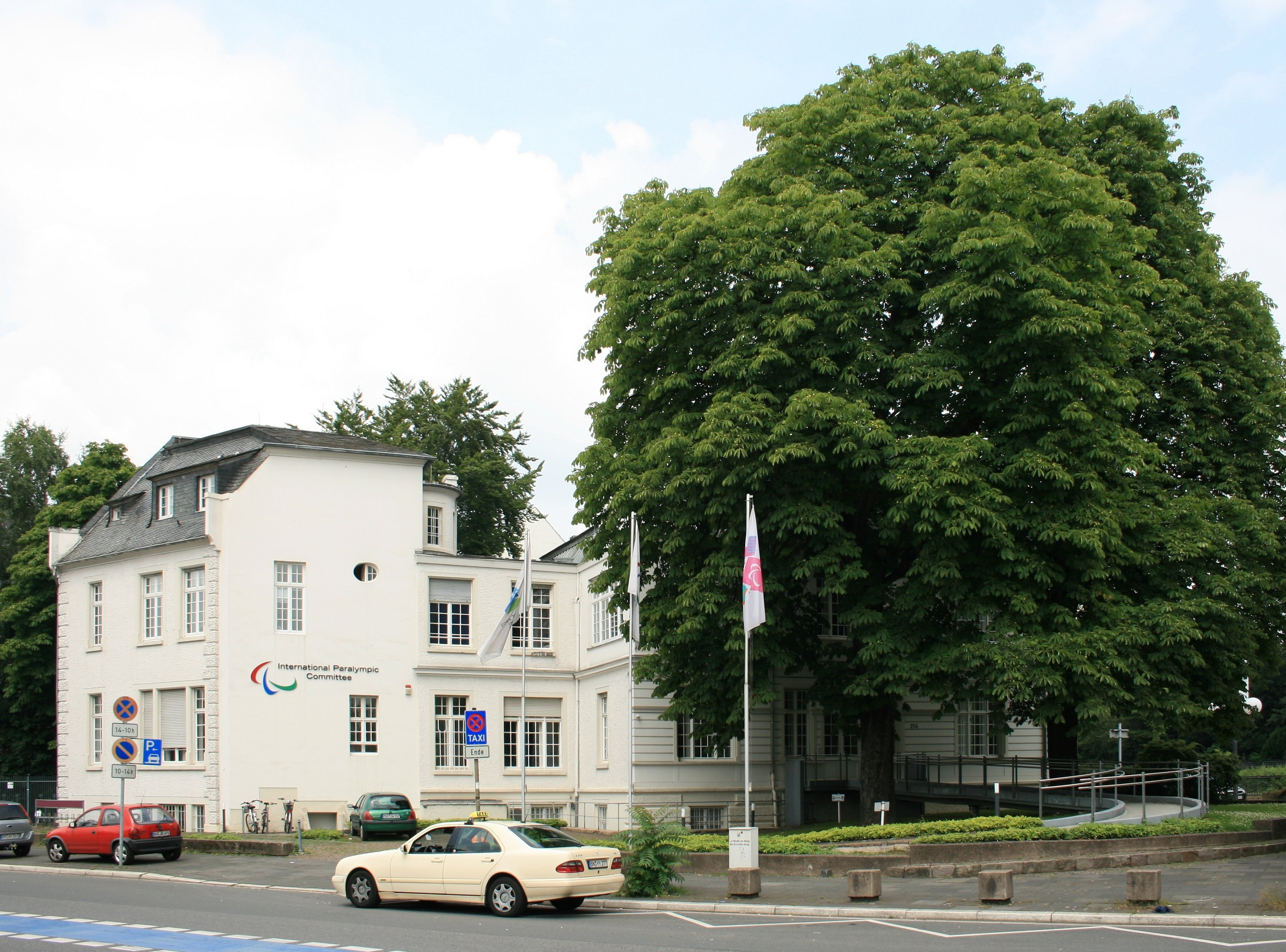
IPC headquarters in Bonn

The first Paralympic symbol (1988–1994) used five pa.

The International Paralympic Committee is the global governing body of the Paralympic Movement. It comprises 211 member organisations made up of 185 National Paralympic Committees (NPCs), 18 International Federations, five Regional Organisations and three disability-specific international sports federations known at International Organisations of Sport for the Disabled. The president of the IPC is Andrew Parsons. The IPC's international headquarters are in Bonn, Germany. The IPC is responsible for organizing the Summer and Winter Paralympic Games. It also serves as the International Federation for five sports (Para athletics, Para swimming, Para powerlifting, Shooting Para sport and Para ice hockey). This requires the IPC to supervise and coordinate the World Championships and other competitions for each of the five sports it regulates.

IPC membership also includes National Paralympic Committees and international sporting federations. International Federations are independent sport federations recognized by the IPC as the sole representative of a Paralympic Sport. International Federations responsibilities include technical jurisdiction and guidance over the competition and training venues of their respective sports during the Paralympic Games. The IPC also recognizes media partners, certifies officials, judges, and is responsible for enforcing the bylaws of the Paralympic Charter.

Since its creation in 1989, IPC has a cooperative relationship with the International Olympic Committee (IOC). Delegates of the IPC are also members of the IOC and participate on IOC committees and commissions. The two governing bodies remain distinct, with separate Games, despite the close working relationship.

The Paralympic Games were designed to emphasize the participants' athletic achievements and not their disability. Recent games have emphasized that these games are about ability and not disability. The movement has grown dramatically since its early days – for example, the number of athletes participating in the Summer Paralympic Games has increased from 400 athletes in Rome in 1960 to 4,342 athletes from 159 countries in Rio de Janeiro in 2016. Both the Paralympic Summer and Winter Games are recognized on the world stage.

Unlike the Olympic Games, English is the official language of the Paralympic movement. The other languages used at each Paralympic Games are the official languages of the host country or host region. Every proclamation (such as the announcement of each country during the parade of nations in the opening ceremony) is spoken in these two or more languages.

== Name and symbols ==
The Paralympic flag

Although the name was originally coined as a portmanteau combining paraplegic (due to its origins as games for people with spinal injuries) and Olympic, the inclusion of other disability groups meant that this was no longer considered very accurate. The present formal explanation for the name is that it derives from the Greek preposition παρά, pará ('beside' or 'alongside') and thus refers to a competition held in parallel with the Olympic Games. The Summer Games of 1988 held in Seoul was the first time the term Paralympic came into official use.

"Spirit in Motion" is the current motto for the Paralympic movement. The current Paralympic flag is used since 2020 and contains three colours, red, blue, and green, which are the colours most widely represented in the flags of nations. The colours are each in the shape of an Agito (which is Latin for 'I move/I shake/I stir'), which is the name given to an asymmetrical crescent specially designed for the Paralympic movement. The three Agitos circle a central point, which is a symbol for the athletes congregating from all points of the globe. The motto and symbol of the IPC were changed in 2003 to their current versions. The change was intended to convey the idea that Paralympians have a spirit of competition and that the IPC as an organization realizes its potential and is moving forward to achieve it. The vision of the IPC is, "To enable Paralympic athletes to achieve sporting excellence and to inspire and excite the world." The Paralympic anthem is "Hymne de l'Avenir" or "Anthem of the Future". It was composed by Thierry Darnis and adopted as the official anthem in March 1996.

== Ceremonies ==
=== Opening ===
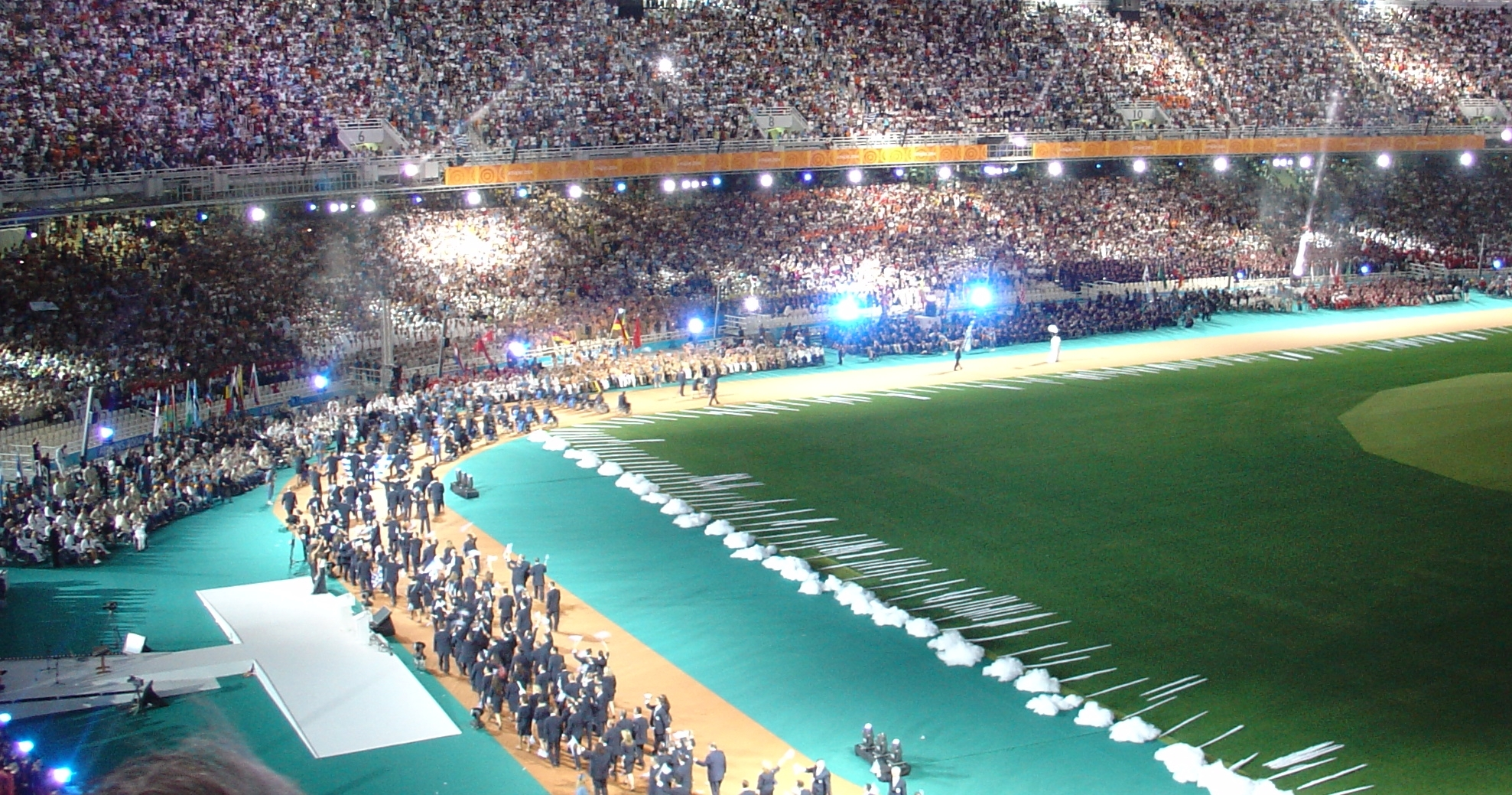
Opening ceremony of the 2004 Summer Paralympics in Athens

As mandated by the Paralympic Charter, various elements frame the opening ceremonies of the Paralympic Games. Most of these rituals were established at the 1920 Summer Olympics in Antwerp and were shared with the Olympic Games. The Opening ceremony typically starts with the hoisting of the host country's flag and a performance of its national anthem. Immediately after the welcome act and the host country anthem and hosting their flag, the "Parade of Nations" starts as the athletes enter the stadium grouped by nation. Since the 1960 Summer Paralympics, the nations enter the stadium alphabetically according to the host country's or region official language, though with the host country's athletes being the last to enter. Beginning with the 2020 Summer Paralympics, the succeeding hosts of the respective Olympic Games (summer or winter) will enter immediately before the current host in descending order. The host nation presents artistic displays of their culture and folklore.

Protocolary segments are held with the speeches given, formally opening the games. After the opening declaration, the Paralympic flag enters the stadium and is hosted along with the Paralympic Anthem, aside from the host country flag, and the oaths by athletes, coaches, and judges are taken. Finally, the Paralympic flame is brought into the stadium and passed on until it reaches the final torch carrier—often a Paralympic athlete from the host nation—who lights the Paralympic flame in the stadium's cauldron.

=== Closing ===
The closing ceremony of the Paralympic Games takes place after all sporting events have concluded. Flag-bearers from each participating country enter, followed by the athletes who enter together, without any national distinction. The Paralympic flag is taken down. Since the 1988 Winter Paralympics, with some exceptions, the national flag of the country hosting the next Summer or Winter Paralympic Games is hoisted while the corresponding national anthem is played. The games are officially closed, and the Paralympic flame is extinguished. After these compulsory elements, the next host nation briefly introduces itself with artistic displays of dance and theater representative of its culture.

=== Medal presentation ===
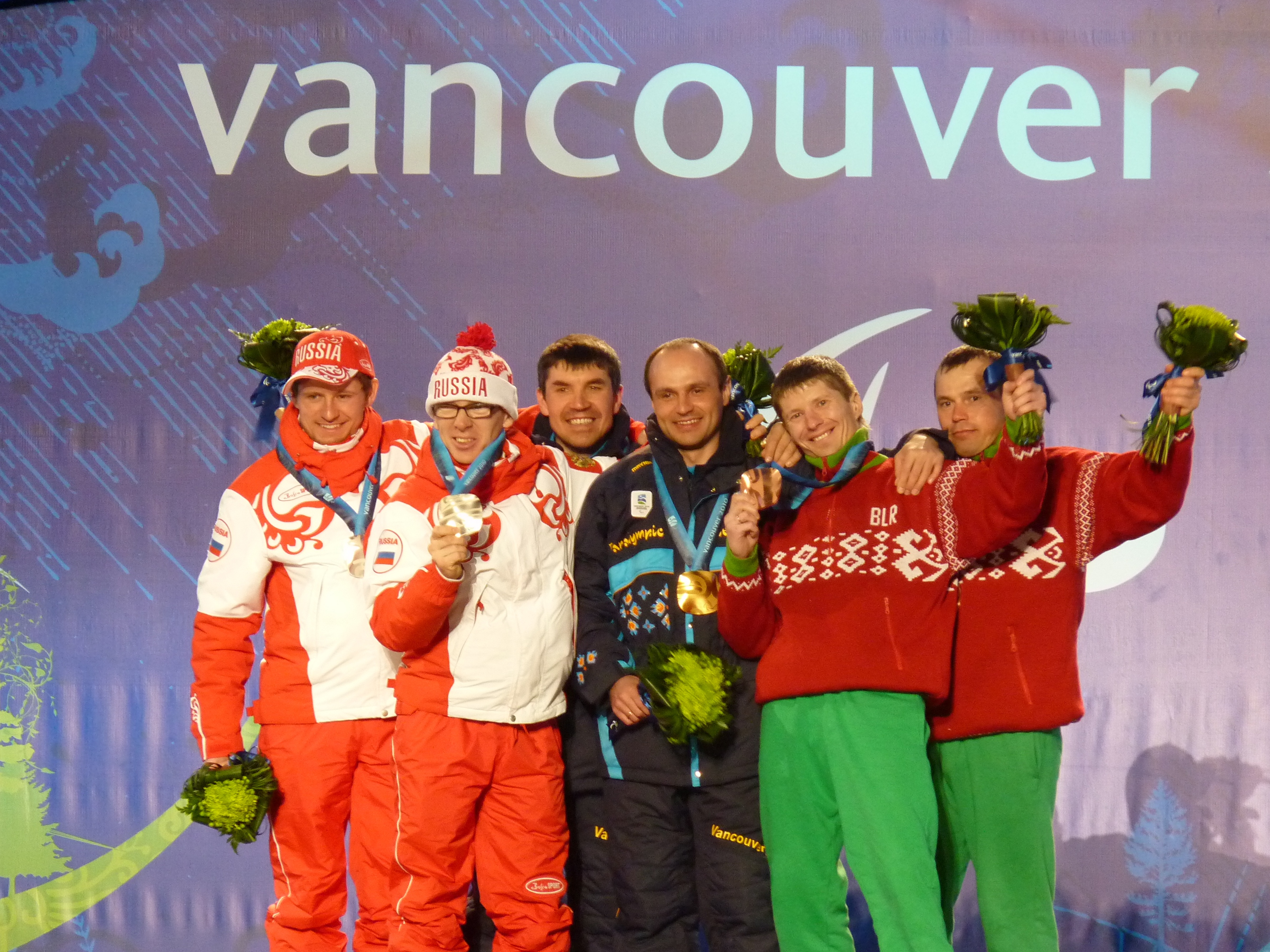
A medal ceremony during the 2010 Winter Paralympics

A medals ceremony is held after the conclusion of each Paralympic event. The winner, second and third-place competitors or teams stand on top of a three-tiered rostrum when they are awarded their respective medal by an IPC member. The national flags of the medalists are then raised while the national anthem of the gold medalist is played. Volunteering citizens of the host country also act as hosts during the medal ceremonies, as they aid the officials who present the medals and act as flag-bearers. For every Paralympic event, the respective medal ceremony is held, at most, one day after the event's final.

== Equality ==
=== Relationship with the Olympics ===
In June 2001, the International Olympic Committee (IOC) and the International Paralympic Committee (IPC) signed an agreement that would ensure that the staging of the Paralympic Games is automatically included in the bid for the Olympic Games. The agreement was set to take effect at the 2008 Paralympic Summer Games in Beijing and the 2010 Paralympic Winter Games in Vancouver. However, the Salt Lake 2002 Organizing Committee (SLOC) chose to follow the practice of "one bid, one city", with one Organizing Committee for both Games, which was followed up by the 2004 Summer Games in Athens. The agreement was adjusted in 2003. An extension was signed in June 2006, after some troubles at the 2006 Winter Paralympics. Initially agreed to remain in effect until the 2012 Summer Olympics, this was later extended to encompass all Summer and Winter games up until the 2020 Summer Olympics. Even beyond this, all Summer and Winter host cities currently announced are preparing pairs of Olympic and Paralympics Games. This was further confirmed when on 10 March 2018, the IOC and the IPC agreed to further extend the contract to the 2032 Summer Olympics.

The IOC has written its commitment to equal access to athletics for all people into its charter, which states,

The practice of sport is a human right. Every individual must have the possibility of practising sport, without discrimination of any kind and in the Olympic spirit, which requires mutual understanding with a spirit of friendship, solidarity and fair play....Any form of discrimination with regard to a country or a person on grounds of race, religion, politics, gender or otherwise is incompatible with belonging to the Olympic Movement.

While the charter is silent on discrimination specifically related to disability; given the language in the charter regarding discrimination it is reasonable to infer that discrimination on the basis of disability would be against the ideals of the Olympic Charter and the IOC. This is also consistent with the Paralympic Charter, which forbids discrimination on the basis of political, religious, economic, disability, gender, sexual orientation or racial reasons.

Chairman of the London organising committee, Sebastian Coe, said about the 2012 Summer Paralympics and 2012 Summer Olympics in London, England, that, "We want to change public attitudes towards disability, celebrate the excellence of Paralympic sport and to enshrine from the very outset that the two Games are an integrated whole."

The 2014 Winter Paralympic Games is the first such Paralympics hosted by Russia. Russia ratified the UN Convention on the Rights of Persons with Disabilities during that period. Notably at 2010 Vancouver, their Paralympic team topped the medal table at the Winter Paralympics, while their Olympic team performed well below expectations at the Winter Olympics. This led the media to highlight the contrast between the achievements of the country's Olympic and Paralympic delegations, despite the greater attention and funding awarded to the Olympic athletes. The Russian Federation organizers of the 2014 Winter Paralympic Games have, since 2007, made efforts to make the host city Sochi more accessible.

In 2012, as part of its prohibition on unauthorised advertising, the Paralympic movement began requiring any tattoo of the Olympic rings to be covered during competition, on the basis that the Olympics is technically a third-party organisation. In 2024 the prohibition was ended after protests from athletes.

IPC president Andrew Parsons has proposed the establishment of a "Youth Paralympic Games", akin to the Youth Olympic Games, but the proposal has been shelved indefinitely.

==== Paralympians at the Olympics ====
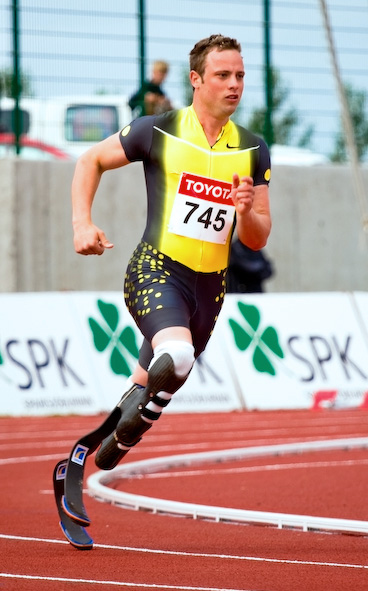
Oscar Pistorius at a track meet on 8 July 2007

Paralympic athletes have sought equal opportunities to compete at the Olympic Games. The precedent was set by Neroli Fairhall, a Paralympic archer from New Zealand, who competed at the 1984 Summer Olympics in Los Angeles. In 2008, Oscar Pistorius, a South African sprinter, attempted to qualify for the 2008 Summer Olympics. Pistorius had both his legs amputated below the knee and races with two carbon fibre blades manufactured by Össur. He holds the Paralympic world record in the 400 meter event. Pistorius missed qualifying for the 2008 Summer Olympics in the 400 meter race, by 0.70 seconds. He qualified for the 2008 Summer Paralympics where he won gold medals in the 100, 200, and 400 meter sprints.

In 2011, Pistorius qualified for the 2012 Summer Olympics and competed in two events: he made the semi-final in the 400 metres race; and his team came 8th in the final of the 4 × 400 metres relay race. Even though all athletes are given equal opportunities to participate in these events, there has been growing criticism that the games may not be fair to all athletes. For example, at the 400 metres race, athletes running with a left prosthetic leg may be disadvantaged compared to those with a right prosthetic leg because races are run anticlockwise.

Some athletes without a disability also compete at the Paralympics. The sighted guides for athletes with a visual impairment are such a close and essential part of the competition that the athlete with visual impairment and the guide are considered a team, and both athletes are medal candidates.

==== Funding ====
Starting at the 1992 Summer Paralympics, recent games have also been supported by contributions from major sponsors. Unlike the Olympics, where the IOC mandates that arenas be clean of sponsor logos, the Paralympics do allow the logos of official sponsors to be displayed inside arenas and on uniforms.

=== Media coverage ===
While the Olympic Games have experienced tremendous growth in global media coverage since the 1984 Summer Paralympics, the Paralympics had been slower to develop a consistent mainstream media presence. In June 2023, IPC executives noted that interest in the Paralympics had been improving among broadcasters, citing that it had already reached rights deals for the 2024 Summer Paralympics covering 75% of the world over a year in advance (in comparison to 2020, where many deals were made "last minute"), and that it had been pushing for broader coverage and increased rights fees since broadcasters were starting to "[realize] that [the Paralympics are] actually a great sporting event", and not treat them as a low-effort obligation bundled with their Olympics rights. Unlike the Olympics, the IPC holds the digital rights to the Paralympics in some markets, allowing it to promote live coverage and other highlights via its own social media platforms to engage online audiences.

Television broadcasts of Paralympic Games began in 1976, but this early coverage was confined to tape-delayed broadcasts to one nation or region. At the 1992 Summer Paralympics, there were 45 hours of live coverage but it was available only in Europe. Other countries broadcast highlight packages during the Games. No meaningful improvements in coverage occurred until the 2000 Summer Paralympics in Sydney.

The 2000 Paralympics represented a significant increase in global media exposure for the Paralympic Games. A deal was reached between the Sydney Paralympic Organizing Committee (SPOC) and All Media Sports (AMS) to broadcast the Games internationally. Deals were reached with Asian, South American, and European broadcast companies to distribute coverage to as many markets as possible. The Games were also webcast for the first time. Because of these efforts, the Sydney Paralympics reached a global audience estimated at 300 million people. Also significant was that the organizers did not have to pay networks to televise the Games as had been done at the 1992 and 1996 Games.

Despite these advances, consistent media attention has been a challenge, which was evidenced in the coverage in Great Britain of the 2010 Winter Paralympics. The BBC was criticized for its minimal coverage of the 2010 Winter Paralympics as compared to its coverage of the 2010 Winter Olympics. The BBC announced it would stream some content on its website and show a one-hour highlight program after the Games ended. For the Winter Olympics the BBC aired 160 hours of coverage. The response from the BBC was that budget constraints and the "time zone factor" necessitated a limited broadcast schedule. The reduction in coverage was done in spite of increased ratings for the 2008 Summer Paralympics, which was watched by 23% of the population of Great Britain. In Norway, the Norwegian Broadcasting Corporation (NRK) broadcast 30 hours of the 2010 Winter Games live. NRK-sport were critical of parts of the TV production from Vancouver, and notified the EBU of issues such as the biathlon coverage excluding the shooting, and cross-country skiing with skiers in the distance, making it hard to follow the progress of the competition. NRK were far more pleased with the production of the ice sledge hockey and wheelchair curling events, which they felt reached the same level as the Olympic Games.

Not all Paralympic events have received television coverage; the IPC and its organisers currently contract with the IOC's media unit Olympic Broadcasting Services (OBS) to produce the broadcast feeds for the Paralympics. At the Summer Paralympics, coverage was limited to 16 sports in 2016, but increased to 19 sports in 2020. In 2024, all 22 Summer Paralympic sports were televised for the first time.

In the UK, Channel 4 assumed the television rights beginning in the 2012 Summer Paralympics, promising major increases in coverage on television and digital platforms, efforts to heighten the Games' profile, and commitments to incorporate people with disabilities among its staff and presenters. Its coverage of the Paralympics have been promoted through major marketing campaigns; several of its advertisements have won Cannes Lions awards, with its trailer for 2016 "We're the Superhumans" receiving an overall Grand Prix award. In January 2020, the Paralympics were classified as a Category A "listed" event by the British telecom regulator Ofcom as with the Olympics, mandating that they be broadcast in whole or in part by a free-to-air network, as with the Olympics. Channel 4 reported that its coverage of the 2024 Summer Paralympics was seen by a total audience of 20 million, with the channel achieving its highest viewer share since the 2012 Paralympics.

=== Outside the Games ===
A 2010 study by the University of British Columbia (UBC) on the Olympic Games Impact (OGI), showed that of roughly 1,600 Canadian respondents, 41 to 50 percent believed the 2010 Paralympic and Olympic Games in Vancouver, British Columbia, Canada, triggered additional accessibility of buildings, sidewalks and public spaces. 23 percent of employers said the Games had increased their willingness to hire people with disabilities.

Chief Executive Officer for the International Paralympic Committee Xavier Gonzalez said about the 2008 Summer Paralympics in Beijing, China, that:

In China, the (Paralympic) Games were really a transformation tool for changing attitudes across the board in China towards people with disability, to building accessibility facilities in the city, to changing laws to allow people with a disability to be part of society.

=== Down syndrome participation ===
Within the framework of the International Olympic Committee's commitment to equal access to athletics, concerns have been raised regarding inclusion of athletes with Down syndrome in the Paralympic Games. While the Paralympic movement strives for inclusivity, the absence of a specific classification for athletes with Down syndrome within Paralympic swimming events raises questions about equal and fair competition for Down syndrome athletes.

International Paralympic Committee Para swimming classification codes are based upon single impairment only, whereas Down syndrome individuals have both physical and intellectual impairments. Although swimmers with Down syndrome are able to compete in the S14 intellectual impairment category (provided they score low in IQ tests), they are often outmatched by the superior physicality of their opponents. At present there is no designated Paralympic category for swimmers with Down syndrome, meaning they have to compete as intellectually disadvantaged athletes. This disregards their physical disabilities.

A number of advocacy groups globally have been lobbying for the inclusion of a distinct classification category for Down syndrome swimmers within the IPC Classification Codes framework. Initiatives aimed at promoting greater inclusivity within the Paralympic movement have emerged, including advocacy and awareness-raising efforts targeting discrimination and ensuring equal opportunities for athletes with Down syndrome. Despite ongoing advocacy, the issue remains unresolved, and swimmers with Down syndrome continue to face challenges in accessing appropriate classification pathways.

== Classification ==
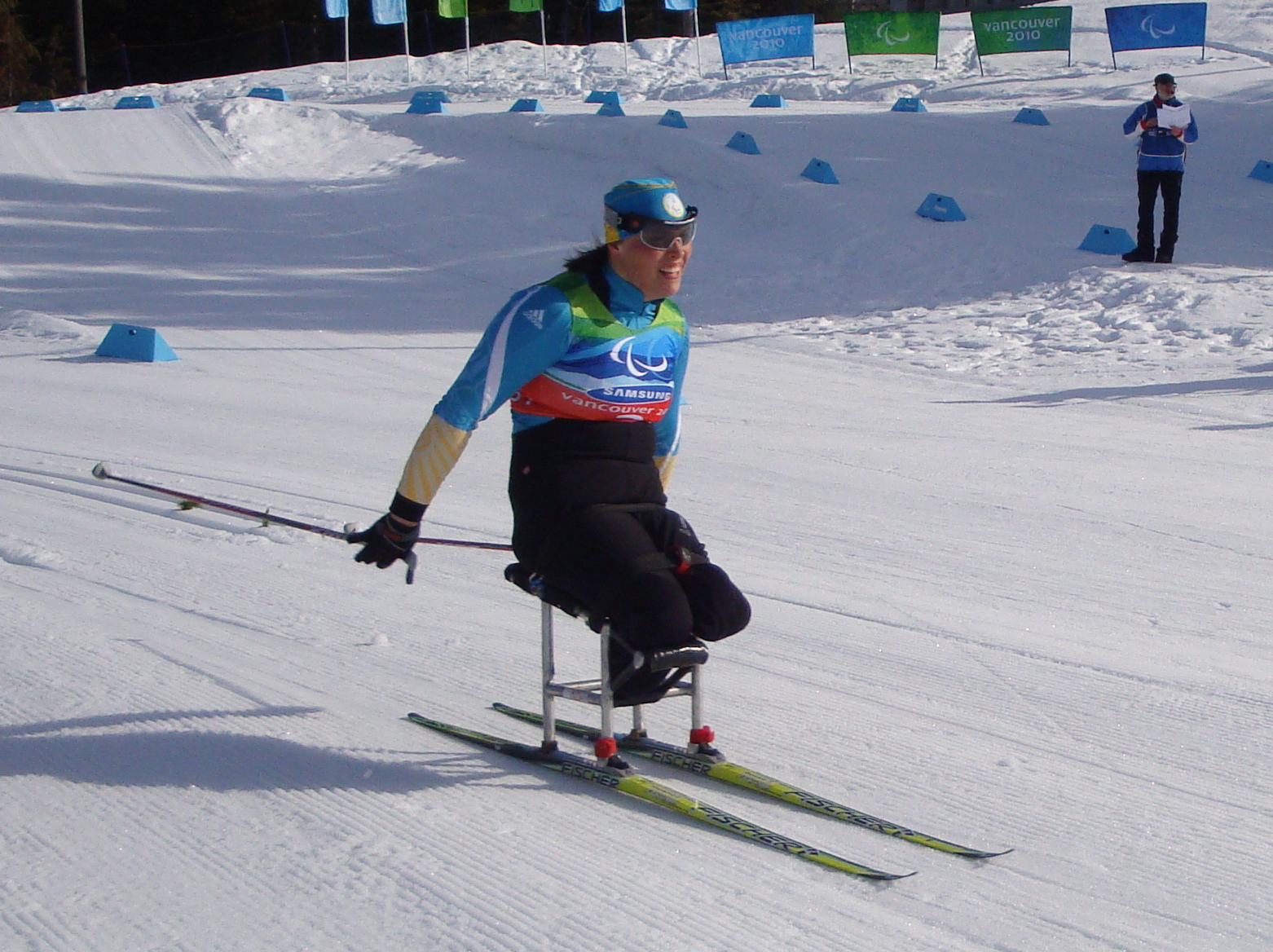
Olena Iurkovska of Ukraine competing on cross-country sit-skis at the 2010 Winter Paralympics

=== Categories ===
The International Paralympic Committee (IPC) has established ten disability categories, including physical, visual, and intellectual impairment. Athletes with one of these disabilities can compete in the Paralympics, are divided within each category according to their level of impairment, in a functional classification system which differs from sport to sport (not every sport can allow for every disability category). These categories apply to both Summer and Winter Paralympics.

Physical Impairment – There are eight different types of physical impairment:

- Impaired muscle power – With impairments in this category, the force generated by muscles, such as the muscles of one limb, one side of the body or the lower half of the body is reduced, (e.g. spinal cord injury, spina bifida, post-polio syndrome).
- Impaired passive range of movement – The range of movement in one or more joints is reduced in a systematic way. Acute conditions such as arthritis are not included.
- Loss of limb or limb deficiency – A total or partial absence of bones or joints from partial or total loss due to illness, trauma, or congenital limb deficiency (e.g., dysmelia).
- Leg-length difference – Significant bone shortening occurs in one leg due to congenital deficiency or trauma.
- Short stature – Standing height is reduced due to shortened legs, arms and trunk, which are due to a musculoskeletal deficit of bone or cartilage structures. (e.g., achondroplasia, growth hormone deficiency, osteogenesis imperfecta)
- Hypertonia – Hypertonia is marked by an abnormal increase in muscle tension and reduced ability of a muscle to stretch. Hypertonia may result from injury, disease, or conditions which involve damage to the central nervous system (e.g., cerebral palsy).
- Ataxia – Ataxia is an impairment that consists of a lack of coordination of muscle movements (e.g., cerebral palsy, Friedreich's ataxia, multiple sclerosis).
- Athetosis – Athetosis is generally characterized by unbalanced, involuntary movements and a difficulty maintaining a symmetrical posture (e.g., cerebral palsy, choreoathetosis).

Visual impairment – Athletes with visual impairment ranging from partial vision, sufficient to be judged legally blind, to total blindness. This includes impairment of one or more component of the visual system (eye structure, receptors, optic nerve pathway, and visual cortex). The sighted guides for athletes with a visual impairment are such a close and essential part of the competition that the athlete with visual impairment and the guide are considered a team. Beginning in 2012, these guides along with sighted goalkeepers in 5-a-side football became eligible to receive medals of their own.

Intellectual disability – Athletes with a significant intellectual impairment and associated limitations in adaptive behaviour. The IPC primarily serves athletes with physical disabilities, but the disability group Intellectual Disability has been added to some Paralympic Games. This includes only elite athletes with intellectual disabilities diagnosed before the age of 18. However, the IOC-recognized Special Olympics World Games are open to all people with intellectual disabilities.

=== Classification system ===
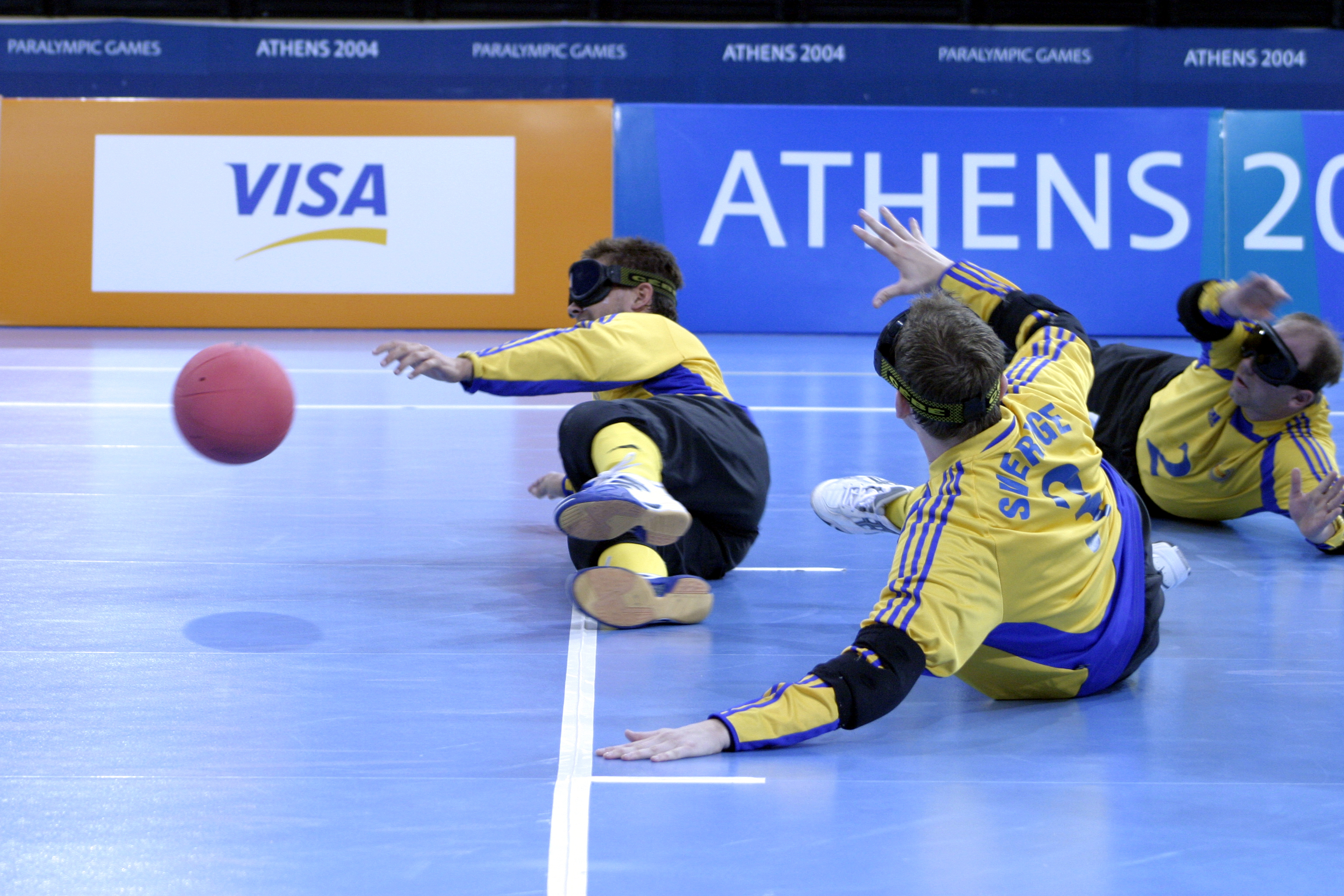
The Swedish goalball team at the 2004 Summer Paralympics

The Paralympics use a functional classification system for athletes, with some variation defined by different sports. In a functional system, the focus is on what effect the athlete's impairment has on his or her athletic performance. Under this system, athletes with total loss of function in their legs will compete together (in most sports), because their functional loss is the same and the reason for the loss is immaterial.

For sports like Paralympic swimming or athletics, which are open to athletes with a wide variety of impairments, participants are assigned into a range of classes based on the disability they have and their level of impairment. This aims to minimise the impact of an athlete's impairment on their sporting performance against their rivals. For example, in athletics and swimming, athletes with visual impairments compete in categories 11–13, with category 11 athletes having a very low light acuity and/or no light perception, and category 13 athletes having the least severe visual impairment eligible for Paralympic sport.

==== Functional levelling of athletes ====
In some sports, athletes will be required to use equipment that equalizes the physical limitations between them. For example the Paralympics recognizes three different grades of visual impairment. Athletes in the swimming S11 grade have the most severe visual disabilities, and all swimmers in this grade must wear blackened goggles to prevent any disadvantage from more severe visual impairments.

==== Team levelling ====
There are also team competitions such as wheelchair rugby or relay swimming where teams are classified as a group. Each athlete is given a sport-specific point value based on their activity limitation. A lower score indicates a more severe activity limitation than a higher score. A team cannot have more than a certain maximum total of points on the field of play at the same time to ensure equal competition. For example, in wheelchair rugby, the four players' combined disability number must total no more than eight points. However in swimming relays there are four categories, with different points totals allowed. Each team must have a combined points value of less than the category total.

== Sports ==
There are twenty-two sports on the Summer Paralympic program and six sports on the Winter Paralympics program. Within some of the sports are several events. For example, alpine skiing has downhill, super combined, super-G, slalom, giant slalom. The IPC has governance over several of the sports but not all of them. Other international organizations, known as International Sports Federations (IF), notably the International Wheelchair and Amputee Sports Federation (IWAS), the International Blind Sports Federation (IBSA), and the Cerebral Palsy International Sports and Recreation Association (CP-ISRA), govern some sports that are specific to certain disability groups. There are national chapters for these International Sport Federations including National Paralympic Committees, which are responsible for recruitment of athletes and governance of sports at the national level.

== Alleged cheating ==
After the 2000 Sydney games, a Spanish basketball player alleged that several members of the gold medal-winning Spanish basketball team with intellectual disabilities (ID) did not have disabilities. He claimed that only two athletes out of the twelve-member team met the qualifications of an athlete with an intellectual disability. A controversy ensued and the International Paralympic Committee (IPC) called on the Spanish National Paralympic Committee to launch an investigation. The investigation uncovered several Spanish athletes who had flouted the ID rules. In an interview with the president of the federation that oversees ID competition, Fernando Martín Vicente admitted that athletes around the world were breaking the ID eligibility rules. The IPC responded by starting an investigation of its own. The results of the IPC's investigation confirmed the Spanish athlete's allegations and also determined that the incident was not isolated to the basketball ID event or to Spanish athletes. As a result, all ID competitions were suspended indefinitely. The ban was lifted after the 2008 Games after work had been done to tighten the criteria and controls governing admission of athletes with intellectual disabilities. Four sports, swimming, athletics, table tennis and rowing, were anticipated to hold competitions for ID athletes at the 2012 Summer Paralympics.

The Paralympics have also been tainted by steroid use. At the 2008 Games in Beijing, three powerlifters and a German basketball player were banned after having tested positive for banned substances. This was a decrease in comparison to the ten powerlifters and one track athlete who were banned from the 2000 Games. German skier Thomas Oelsner became the first Winter Paralympian to test positive for steroids. He had won two gold medals at the 2002 Winter Paralympics, but his medals were stripped after his positive drug test. At the 2010 Winter Paralympics in Vancouver, Swedish curler Glenn Ikonen tested positive for a banned substance and was suspended for six months by the IPC. He was removed from the rest of the curling competition but his team was allowed to continue. The 54-year-old curler said his doctor had prescribed a medication on the banned substances list.

Another concern now facing Paralympic officials is the technique of "boosting". Athletes can artificially increase their blood pressure, often by self-harming, which has been shown to improve performance by up to 15%. This is most effective in the endurance sports such as cross-country skiing. To increase blood pressure athletes will deliberately cause trauma to limbs below a spinal injury. This trauma can include breaking bones, strapping extremities in too tightly, and using high-pressure compression stockings. The injury is painless but it does affect the athlete's blood pressure.

Another potential concern is the use of gene therapy among Paralympic athletes. All Paralympic athletes are banned from enhancing their abilities through gene doping, but it is extremely difficult to differentiate these concepts. The World Anti-Doping Agency (WADA) is currently researching both gene doping and gene therapy, in part to discern the boundary between the two closely related concepts.

The IPC have been working with WADA since 2003, to ensure compliance with WADA's anti-doping code among its Paralympic athletes. The IPC has also promised to continue increasing the number of athletes tested at each of its Games, in order to further minimize the possible effect of doping in Paralympic sports. Mandatory in- and out-of competition testing has also been implemented by the IPC to further ensure all of its athletes are performing in compliance with WADA regulations.

Having sent samples for forensic analysis, the IPC found evidence that the prevalent doping by Russian athletes was in operation at the 2014 Winter Paralympics in Sochi. On 7 August 2016, the IPC's Governing Board voted unanimously to ban the entire Russian team from the 2016 Summer Paralympics, citing the Russian Paralympic Committee's inability to enforce the IPC's Anti-Doping Code and the World Anti-Doping Code which is "a fundamental constitutional requirement". IPC President Sir Philip Craven stated that the Russian government had "catastrophically failed its Para athletes". IPC Athletes' Council Chairperson and CPC Member Todd Nicholson said that Russia had used athletes as "pawns" to "show global prowess".

Russian athletes were allowed to compete under a neutral flag in the 2020 Tokyo Paralympics, but Russia (and Belarus) was fully excluded again in 2022 after Russia’s full-scale invasion of Ukraine. In September 2025 the IPC removed restrictions on Russia competing in 2026, although bans by some international sports federations prevent its participation in all sports.

== Notable champions and achievements ==
Trischa Zorn of the United States is the most decorated paralympian in history. She competed in the blind swimming events and won a total of 55 medals, 41 of which are gold. Her Paralympic career spanned 24 years from 1980 to 2004. She was also an alternate on the 1980 American Olympic swim team, but did not go to the Olympics due to a boycott by the United States and several of its allies. Ragnhild Myklebust of Norway holds the record for the most medals ever won at the Winter Paralympic Games. Competing in a variety of events between 1988 and 2002, she won a total of 22 medals, of which 17 were gold. After winning five gold medals at the 2002 Games she retired at the age of 58. Neroli Fairhall, a paraplegic archer from New Zealand, was the first paraplegic competitor, and the third Paralympian, to participate in the Olympic Games, when she competed in the 1984 Summer Olympics in Los Angeles. She placed thirty-fourth in the Olympic archery competition, and won a Paralympic gold medal in the same event.

== Host cities ==
1988 Summer Paralympics and 1988 Winter Paralympics was the first time the term Paralympic was used officially.

Year	Summer Paralympic Games			Winter Paralympic Games		
Year	Edition	Host(s)	Top nation	Edition	Host(s)	Top nation
1960	1	(Italy) Rome	Italy			
1964	2	(Japan) Tokyo	United States			
1968	3	(Israel) Tel Aviv	United States			
1972	4	(West Germany) Heidelberg	West Germany			
1976	5	(Canada) Toronto	United States	1	(Sweden) Örnsköldsvik	West Germany
1980	6	(Netherlands) Arnhem	United States	2	(Norway) Geilo	Norway
1984	7	(United States) New York City (United Kingdom) Stoke Mandeville	United States	3	(Austria) Innsbruck	Austria
1988	8	(South Korea) Seoul	United States	4	(Austria) Innsbruck	Norway
1992	9	(Spain) Barcelona & Madrid	United States	5	(France) Tignes and Albertville	United States
1994				6	(Norway) Lillehammer	Norway
1996	10	(United States) Atlanta	United States			
1998				7	(Japan) Nagano	Norway
2000	11	(Australia) Sydney	Australia			
2002				8	(United States) Salt Lake City	Germany
2004	12	(Greece) Athens	China			
2006				9	(Italy) Turin	Russia
2008	13	(China) Beijing	China			
2010				10	(Canada) Vancouver	Germany
2012	14	(United Kingdom) London	China			
2014				11	(Russia) Sochi	Russia
2016	15	(Brazil) Rio de Janeiro	China			
2018				12	(South Korea) Pyeongchang	United States
2020	16	(Japan) Tokyo^{[a]}	China			
2022				13	(China) Beijing	China
2024	17	(France) Paris	China			
2026				14	(Italy) Milan-Cortina d'Ampezzo	China
2028	18	(United States) Los Angeles				
2030				15	(France) Alps	
2032	19	(Australia) Brisbane				
2034				16	(United States) Utah	

^{a} Postponed to 2021, due to the COVID-19 pandemic, marking the first time that the Paralympic Games has been postponed. They are still called the 2020 Summer Paralympics, even with the change in scheduling to one year later. The Games were held from 24 August to 5 September 2021.

== See also ==
- All-time Paralympic Games medal table
- Parapan American Games
- Asian Para Games
- Commonwealth Paraplegic Games
- Cybathlon
- Disability flag
