= Anuj Sharma =

Anuj Sharma may refer to:

- Anuj Sharma (singer), Indian playback singer
- Anuj Sharma (actor) (born 1976), Indian politician and actor
- Anuj Sharma (police officer) (born 1968), officer of the Indian Police Service

== See also ==
- Anu Sharma, American audiologist and academic
