= National Dope Testing Laboratory =

Indian sports/dope analysis

The National Dope Testing Laboratory (NDTL) is a premier analytical testing & research organization established as an autonomous body under the Ministry of Youth Affairs and Sports, Government of India. It is the only laboratory in the country responsible for human sports dope testing. It is headed by Chief Executive Officer (CEO). Dr. Puran Lal Sahu is the Scientific Director of NDTL.

It is accredited by National Accreditation Board for Testing & Calibration Laboratories, NABL (ISO/IEC 17025:2017) for human dope testing of urine & blood samples from human sports. NDTL is one of the 29 WADA accredited laboratories in the world. It is one of the modern and state-of-the-art laboratories in the country equipped with the latest analytical instrumentation.

== Introduction ==
The NDTL in India was established in 2008 with an aim to get permanently accredited by International Olympic Committee (IOC) and World Anti Doping Agency to do the testing for the banned drugs in human sports. The Lab has successfully completed sample testing for numerous major International as well National events since its inception. The lab was earlier located in the Jawaharlal Nehru Stadium and is shifted to the new site within its stadium complex at New Delhi on May 14, 2009 with better facilities. The area of the new NDTL lab is 2700 square meters as against the earlier area of only 900 square meters.

== Accreditation ==
NDTL is accredited by various National and International agencies to carry out human dope testing. Some of the organizations that accredited NDTL are as follows:

- World Anti Doping Agency
- National Accreditation Board for Testing and Calibration Laboratories for Chemical Testing, Biological Testing
- CSCQ

== History ==
- The dope testing Lab in India was established in 1990 (as Dope control Centre under the Sports Authority of India). The lab was modernized in 2002 with an aim to get it permanently accredited by International Olympic Commission and WADA.
- The lab got ISO/IEC 17025 accreditation in 2003 : An eligibility criteria for applying for WADA accreditation.
- Since Sports Authority of India is responsible for training of elite athletes, hence in view of conflict of interest, a decision was taken to have the independent body responsible for managing the Anti Doping Program in the country.
- The Union Cabinet took a decision to sign the Copenhagen declaration on anti doping and to set up National Anti Doping Agency in December 2004.
- The first meeting of General Body/Governing Body of NDTL was held under the Chairmanship of then Honourable Minister Youth Affairs & Sports M.S. Gill on 5th Jan. 2009. The recruitment rules, tariff for dope testing, action plan for Common Wealth Games 2010 was duly approved by the Governing Body.

== Research Projects ==
NDTL has state of arts facilities for research and is engaged in conducting research on various projects. The research paper is presented in various National and International conferences and published in indexed journals. The first ever Ph.D. thesis : "Detectability of Indian glucocorticosteroid preparations in sports persons: Effect on the endogenous steroid profile" was submitted in April 2009 by Madhusudhana I.Reddy and degree has been awarded.

- Projects Accomplished:
1. Detectability of Corticosteroid in various Indian preparations: Effect on Endogenous steroid profile.
2. Characteristics of IEF Patterns and SDS-PAGE Result of Indian EPO Biosimilars.
3. Establishing Reference Range for Endogenous Steroids in Indian Sportspersons and to study the effect of ethnicity and steroid abuse on delta values of endogenous steroids.
4. Analytical strategies in the development and utilization of mass spectrometric method for analysis of Stimulants & Narcotics.
5. Effect of Ethnicity and Anabolic Steroid Abuse on Delta Value of Endogenous Steroids.
6. Rapid Screening in Doping Analysis: Separation and Detection of Doping Agents be Liquid and Gas Chromatographic Mass Spectrometric Analysis.
- Current Projects:
1. Detection of Synthetic glucocortico steroids, stimulants and anabolic steroids in Indian herbal drugs and supplements.
2. Discrimination of biological and synthetic origin of anabolic steroids in human urine: Correlation between GCMSD & Isotope Ratio Mass Spectrometry.
3. An Analytical approach for the Screening of Performance Enhancing Substances from various Dietary Supplements & to study their excretion profile using Chromatographic-Mass Spectrometric Technique.
4. Development of analytical tools for the Detection and Identification of performance enhancing Peptides in Biological Specimen.
5. An analytical approach for the Detection of Corticosteroids in Human and Horse Biological Specimen using Chromatographic and Mass Spectrometric Technique.
6. To study the effect of various preparation of Testosterone on Steroid Profiling and Delta Value of 13C/12C of Testosterone Metabolite in volunteers with Normal/Abnormal Testosterone/ Epitestosterone (T/E) Ratio.
7. Indian Herbal Drugs : Identification of stimulants, narcotics and other substances with potential of ergogenic aids in sports.
8. Characterization of physiochemical properties and analysis of liposomes in human biological samples using hyphenated analytical technique.
9. Detection of Stanozolol conjugated metabolites by liquid chromatography tandem-mass spectrometry.
10. Prednisone excretion study and identification of its marker metabolites.
11. Rapid determination of urinary phthalates using liquid chromatography tandem mass spectrometry.
12. Identification of various banned small peptides in human urine using liquid chromatography tandem mass spectrometry.

== Instruments and Technologies ==
The National Dope Testing Laboratory is equipped with state of the art technologies and the most modern equipment.

The use of Gas Chromatography coupled with Mass Spectrometry (GC-MS) is the most common and the oldest technology being used worldwide for dope testing. Nowadays, the use of liquid chromatography coupled to tandem mass spectrometry (LC-MS/MS) has become quite widespread. This technique has helped detect the difficult drugs falling into various categories of banned substances and is becoming increasingly more important in the fight against doping. Apart from GC-MS and LC-MS/MS, the use of Gas Chromatography coupled with tandem Mass Spectrometry (GC-MS/MS) and Isotope-ratio mass spectrometry (IRMS) is also very prevalent in sports dope testing.

Both GC-MS/MS and LC-MS/MS are used primarily to analyze urine samples. The analysis of the blood matrix requires a completely different type of equipment which is commonly used in hospital laboratories.

== Events Organized by NDTL ==
Since its inception, NDTL has organized many events as follows:

- One Day Interactive Session with Horse Racing officials : October 14, 2015
- One Day Seminar on "Latest trends in Anti Doping Science" : October 15, 2015
- 3rd WADA Q/A Meeting : January 28–29, 2016
- First International Conference on "Implementation of latest Guidelines in human and horse doping: Interaction between Testing authorities and Doping Control Laboratories" : November 4–5, 2016

== See also ==
- Sports Authority of India
- National Anti-Doping Agency
- World Anti-Doping Agency
- List of drugs banned by WADA
- Ministry of Youth Affairs and Sports
