= Rehan, India =

Rehan
- town
- Location in Himachal Pradesh, India Rehan (India)
- Coordinates: 32.1622804°N 75.9084141°E
- Country: India
- State: Himachal Pradesh
- District: Kangra

Area
  - Total: 25 km^{2} (9.7 sq mi)

Population
  - Total: 12,000
  - Density: 480/km^{2} (1,200/sq mi)

Languages
  - Official: Hindi
  - Native: Pahari
- Time zone: UTC+5:30 (IST)
- PIN: 176022
- Telephone code: 01893
- Vehicle registration: HP-88, HP-38
- Nearest city: Pathankot, Jassur, Kangra, DHARAMSHALA
- Sex ratio: 910 ♂/♀
- Literacy: 90%%
- Lok Sabha constituency: Kangra- Chamba
- Vidhan Sabha constituency: Fatehpur

Rehan is a small town in the Kangra district of Himachal Pradesh state, in the north of India. It is well-known as a juncture between the towns of Nurpur, Jawali and Pathankot. Pathankot is the nearest and largest city with two railway stations. It is also the place of Freedom fighter and then MLA of the constituency from 1952 to 1972 Comrade Shr. Ram Chandar, one of the close associates of Shaheed Bhagat Singh.

Rehan produces local honey, oil, cheese and vegetables, though it exports very little. Rehan is famous for Afghan pita hats. The majority of the population speak varieties of Western Pahari. There are many surrounding villages, including Dehri, Padhar, Bharal, Sakri, Chattar, Khukhnara and Bharmar.

The famous festival in Rehan in the name of Siddh Baba Shri Raja Ram takes place on 16 February each year.

== Connectivity ==
=== By Air ===
Spicejet is running daily flights from New Delhi to Gagal Airport which is 64 km from Rehan. Pathankot Airport, 36 km away from Rehan, is opened up for commercial flights where Air India operates 3 days a week. Other airports close to Rehan are Amritsar (150 km) and Jammu, 150 km from Rehan.

=== By Rail ===
Rehan is connected by narrow gauge railway from Pathankot. Approximate distance from Pathankot to Rehan is 36 km.

The Kangra Valley Toy Train also operates in the town. The nearest railway station is at Bharmar, 6 km from main bus stand.
