= Mera Yuva Bharat =

Scheme set up by the Government of India

Mera Yuva Bharat (MY Bharat)
- मेरा युवा भारत
- Commercial?: No
- Country: India
- Prime Minister(s): Narendra Modi
- Ministry: Ministry of Youth Affairs and Sports
- Launched: 31 October 2023; 2 years ago Kartavya Path
- Status: Active
- Website: mybharat.gov.in

Mera Yuva Bharat (Hindi: मेरा युवा भारत) is an autonomous body set up by the Ministry of Youth Affairs & Sports, Government of India, serving young Indians and acting as an overarching, tech-enabled mechanism for youth development and youth-led development, providing them with equitable access to opportunities. Thus enabling youth to actualise their aspirations and contribute towards the vision of Viksit Bharat by 2047.

== Name ==
The MY Bharat (MY, an acronym for Mera Yuva, 'my youth') is a phygital (physical and digital) platform that combines physical activities with opportunities to connect digitally.

== Launch ==
The MY Bharat portal was launched by Narendra Modi on 31 October 2023 on the occasion of National Unity Day at Kartavya Path in New Delhi. It also marks the birth anniversary of Sardar Vallabhbhai Patel.

== History ==
On 11 October 2023, the Union Cabinet approved the establishment of the autonomous body, Mera Yuva Bharat (MY Bharat), to benefit youth aged 15–29 years, aligning with the definition of ‘Youth’ in the National Youth Policy.

== Reception ==
Within just four months of its inception, MY Bharat surpassed 1 crore 58 lakh registrations by 9 September 2024, recording more than 60,000 registrations every day. Modi acknowledged the contributions of youth in nation-building while addressing the Viksit Bharat Sankalp Yatra. In another address during the Veer Baal Diwas on 26 December 2023, he appealed to every young person in India to register on the portal.

== See also ==
- Government of India
- Digital India
- National Youth Festival
- Viksit Bharat
