= National Sports Governance Act, 2025 =

Indian law

Parliament of India
- Long title: An Act to provide for the development and promotion of sports, welfare measures for sportspersons, ethical practices based on basic universal principles of good governance, ethics and fair play of the Olympic and sports movement, the Olympic Charter, the Paralympic Charter, international best practices and established legal standards and to provide for the resolution of sports grievances and sports disputes in a unified, equitable and effective manner and for matters connected therewith or incidental thereto.
- Citation: No. 25 of 2025
- Passed by: Lok Sabha
- Passed: 11 August 2025
- Considered by: Rajya Sabha
- Passed: 12 August 2025
- Assented to by: President Droupadi Murmu
- Assented to: 18 August 2025
- Commenced: 31 December 2025 (Partly) (Note: Ss.1 to 3, sub-sections (1), (2) and (4) of section 4, sub-sections (1) and (2) of section 5, sub-section (5) of section 8, sub-section (1) of section 11, section 14, section 15, sub-sections (1) to (7) and (10) of section 17, section 30, section 31, section 33 to 38)

Legislative history

Initiating chamber: Lok Sabha
- Bill title: National Sports Governance Bill, 2025
- Bill citation: Bill No. 76 of 2025
- Introduced by: Mansukh Mandaviya, Minister of Labour and Employment; and Youth Affairs and Sports
- Introduced: 23 July 2025
- Passed: 11 August 2025

Revising chamber: Rajya Sabha
- Passed: 12 August 2025
- Status: Not fully in force

The National Sports Governance Act, 2025 is an Act of the Parliament of India that establishes a statutory framework for recognition, governance, and oversight of national sports bodies in India. It seeks to align Indian sports governance with the Olympic Charter, Paralympic Charter, and other international sports governance standards. The Act also establishes dispute resolution mechanisms, ethical codes, safe sports policies, and election oversight for sports organisations.

== Background and Timeline ==
=== Background ===
The Act replaced ad-hoc governance arrangements under the National Sports Development Code of India, 2011, providing a comprehensive legal framework to improve transparency, accountability, and athlete welfare. The Act is aimed at curbing factionalism and administrative interventions that disrupt sports development, and to prepare India’s sports governance for hosting major events such as the proposed 2036 Summer Olympics.

=== Timeline ===
- 23 July 2025: the National Sports Governance Bill, 2025, was introduced in Lok Sabha, the lower house of the Parliament of India.
- 11 August 2025: the National Sports Governance Bill, 2025, was passed by Lok Sabha.
- 12 August 2025: the National Sports Governance Bill, 2025, was passed by Rajya Sabha.

== Provisions ==
=== Definitions ===
The Act defines key terms including National Sports Body, National Olympic Committee, National Paralympic Committee, National Sports Federation, Regional Sports Federation, National Sports Board, ad hoc administrative body, affiliate unit, sportsperson of outstanding merit, and International Charters and Statutes.

=== National Sports Governing Bodies ===
The Act provides for the establishment of:

- The National Olympic Committee, recognised by the International Olympic Committee,
- The National Paralympic Committee, recognised by the International Paralympic Committee,
- A National Sports Federation for each designated sport, and
- A Regional Sports Federation for each designated sport.

Each national body must affiliate with its respective international body, have state and district affiliate units, form an Executive Committee (max. 15 members) with at least two sportspersons of outstanding merit, two athlete representatives, and four women, and create Ethics, Dispute Resolution, and Athletes Committees. Terms are limited to three consecutive terms with a mandatory cooling-off period, subject to international rules on age and tenure.

=== National Sports Board (NSB) ===
The Act empowers the central government to establish the NSB as the apex recognition and regulatory authority for sports bodies. Its functions include:

- Granting, renewing, suspending, or cancelling recognition,
- Maintaining a register of bodies and affiliates,
- Conducting inquiries into governance, athlete welfare, and misuse of funds,
- Issuing guidelines for Codes of Ethics and Safe Sports Policies,
- Constituting ad hoc administrative bodies in cases of recognition loss,
- Maintaining a National Sports Election Panel roster.

Only recognised bodies may receive central government funding. NSB members are appointed on the recommendation of a search-cum-selection committee.

=== Safe Sports Policy and Code of Ethics ===
The NSB must frame a Safe Sports Policy to protect women, minors, and other vulnerable participants. Each national body must adopt a Code of Ethics aligned with international bodies, ensuring standards of conduct, integrity, and safeguarding.

=== Privileges and Duties ===
Recognised sports organisations:

- May receive government grants,
- Must comply with the Act and international statutes,
- Are deemed public authorities under the Right to Information Act, 2005 in respect of their statutory functions.

=== Elections ===
The central government will notify a National Sports Election Panel of experienced former election officials to oversee fair elections in national bodies and their affiliates. National bodies must also maintain panels for state and district affiliate elections.

=== National Sports Tribunal ===
The Act establishes a tribunal comprising:

- A chairperson (Supreme Court judge or Chief Justice of a High Court),
- Two eminent members with sports, public administration, or legal expertise.

It adjudicates sports disputes, except those under international event jurisdiction, internal disputes, doping matters, or matters reserved to other bodies. Appeals lie to the Supreme Court unless international statutes require appeal to the Court of Arbitration for Sport.

=== Use of National Names and Insignia ===
Sports organisations using “India”, “Indian”, “National”, or national insignia in their name, logo, or activities require central government approval. Only authorised bodies may field teams representing India.

=== Miscellaneous ===
The Act:

- Creates the National Sports Board Fund,
- Requires audited accounts by the Comptroller and Auditor-General,
- Empowers the central government to promote and develop sports, make rules, grant exemptions, issue directions, and resolve conflicts between domestic law and international statutes.

== See also ==
- Sports Authority of India
- Ministry of Youth Affairs and Sports
- Olympic Charter
- Paralympic Charter
- Promotion and Regulation of Online Gaming Act, 2025
