= Khwaabb =

2014 film

- Theatrical release poster
- Directed by: Zaid Ali Khan
- Written by: Moraad Ali Khan
- Produced by: Moraad Ali Khan
- Starring: Navdip Singh; Simer Motiani
- Cinematography: Aharon Rothschild
- Edited by: Sejal Painter
- Music by: Sandeep Chowta; Sajjad Ali Chandwani
- Production company: Bullseye Productions
- Release date: 9 May 2014
- Running time: 101 minutes
- Country: India
- Language: Hindi

Khwaabb (transl. Dream) is a 2014 Indian Hindi-language romance and drama film directed by Zaid Ali Khan and produced by Moraad Ali Khan under the banner of Bullseye Productions. It stars Navdip Singh and Simar Motiani. The film's soundtrack was composed by Sandeep Chowta and Sajjad Ali Chandwani. It was released worldwide on 9 May 2014.

The story revolves around the lives of two athletes: their struggles, their dreams and their aspirations.

The official trailer of Khwaabb was unveiled on 23 August 2013 in Delhi. Upon being released on the net on the following day, the trailer got 122,000 views in 10 days.

Khwaabb was initially supposed to be released in October 2012. However, it was later postponed to 9 May 2014.

== Plot ==
Sanjay Kumar (Navdip Singh) lives a life dealing with his alcoholic father and is in love with Kiran Missra (Simer Motiani), who belongs to the same village. While Kiran is an ace swimmer, Sanjay can run pretty fast. Soon an idealistic coach of the sports academy, Ram Prasad Lakshman (Bajrangbali Singh) spots the two and brings them to his academy.

Kiran makes the most of this opportunity and works hard on her talent, while Sanjay only has eyes on her. He gets irritated watching Kiran with a rich brat named Sameer (Rishi Miglani). When Kiran slaps him publicly, he starts drinking heavily. The coach rebukes Sanjay for not focusing on his career and pulls him to the field to get successful first. Both Kiran and Sanjay train hard and go on to win the National championships.

Kiran's ordeals begin when she fails the dope test and watches her world fall apart. Sanjay consoles her and soon Kiran begins her new life while training harder under the guidance of Nafisa Ali. She qualifies for a world championship in Dubai. However, the sports officials use up the allocated budget, who are more interested in taking their families on vacation to Dubai or having fun. They notify all the qualified participants to deposit Rs. 150,000. After the corporation turn their backs on funding her, Sanjay comes to the rescue again and arranges money for her. But in the process, he finds short of the money to be deposited for himself. He has to stay back while Kiran goes on to win the world championships.

== Cast ==
- Navdip Singh as Sanjay Kumar
- Simer Motiani as Kiran Missra
- Bajrangbali Singh as Ram Prasad Lakshman
- Rishi Miglani as Sameer
- Apeksha Verma as Archie
- Nafisa Ali as Herself
- Jeetendr.Gupta as Rihipal
- Dhirendra Gupta as Nathalal
- Vaibhav Bhisht as Immamudim
- Abbas Ali Khan as Sanjay's father
- Manoj Bakshi as Baldev Singh

== Music ==
Khwaabb

Soundtrack album by: Sandeep Chowta; Sajjad Ali Chandwani
- Released: 7 March 2014
- Genre: Feature film soundtrack
- Length: 14:26
- Label: Times Music

Sandeep Chowta chronology
Saheb, Biwi Aur Gangster Returns (2013)	Khwaabb (2014)

Sajjad Ali Chandwani chronology
Challo Driver (2012)	Khwaabb (2014)

The music launch was done by Salman Khan on 28 March 2014 where he stated his interest in producing a sports-based movie. Music of Khwaabb has been composed by Sandeep Chowta and Sajjad Ali Chandwani. The soundtrack album consists of three tracks.

=== Track listing ===
Khwaabb
No.	Title	Music	Singer(s)	Length
1.	"Khwaabb"	Sandeep Chowta	Sonu Nigam	4:18
2.	"TV Ko Dekh"	Sajjad Ali Chandwani	Kailash Kher	3:57
3.	"Shamein"	Sajjad Ali Chandwani	Shreya Ghoshal, Rahat Nusrat Fateh Ali Khan	6:11
4.	"The Final Lap"	Amal Malik	Instrumental	3:18
5.	"The Love Unspoken"	Amal Malik	Instrumental	1:31
6.	"Kiran's Discovery"	Amal Malik	Instrumental	2:39
Total length:				19:15
