= Ministry of Youth Affairs and Sports =

Government ministry of India

Coordinates: 28.615940°N 77.215747°E

Ministry of Youth Affairs and Sports, Government of India
- Branch of Government of India

- Ministry of Youth Affairs and Sports

Agency overview
- Jurisdiction: Government of India
- Headquarters: Shastri Bhawan, New Delhi
- Annual budget: ₹4,479.88 crore (US$480 million) (2026-27 est)
- Minister responsible: Mansukh Mandaviya, Cabinet Minister
- Deputy Minister responsible: Raksha Khadse, Minister of State
- Agency executives: Sunil Paliwal , IAS, Youth Affairs Secretary; Hari Ranjan Rao, IAS, Sports Secretary
- Parent department: Government of India
- Child agencies: Sports Authority of India; NSS; Nehru Yuva Kendra Sangathan; Rajiv Gandhi National Institute of Youth Development; LNIP
- Website: yas.gov.in/en

The Ministry of Youth Affairs and Sports is a branch of the Government of India which administers the Department of Youth Affairs and the Department of Sports in India. Mansukh Mandaviya is the current Minister of Youth Affairs and Sports followed by his Deputy Raksha Khadse.

The ministry also gives the annual National Youth Awards, National Sports awards in various categories, including the Arjuna Award and Major Dhyan Chand Khel Ratna awards.

== History ==
The ministry was set up as the Department of Sports at the time of organisation of 1982 Asian Games New Delhi. Its name was changed to the Department of Youth Affairs & Sports during celebration of the International Youth Year, 1985. It became a separate Ministry on 27 May 2000. Subsequently, In 2008, the ministry has been bifurcated into Department of Youth Affairs and Department of Sports under two separate Secretaries.

== Department of Youth Affairs ==
Unlike the sports department, many of the functions of the department are related to other ministries, like Ministry of Education, Employment & Training, Health and Family Welfare thus it functions largely as a facilitator for youth building.

=== Definition of Youth ===
The United Nations defines "Youth" as 15–24 years and in the Commonwealth, it is 15–29 years. In order to use a definition more in line with these international standards, the Draft NYP 2012 changes the definition from 13 to 35 years to 16–30 years. The draft NYP 2012 plans to divide the age bracket of 16–30 years into three groups.

=== Organisations ===
- Nehru Yuva Kendra Sanghatan
- Rajiv Gandhi National Institute of Youth Development

=== Programmes ===
- Rashtriya Yuva Sashaktikaran Karyakram: Merge of schemes (National Youth Corps, Youth Hostels etc.)
- National Programme for Youth and Adolescent Development (NPYAD): introduced 2008-09
- National Service Scheme (NSS)
- National Youth Corps
- International Youth Exchange Program
- National Youth Festival
- Urban Sports Infrastructure Scheme (USIS): a pilot project in 2010–11 to provide funding for infrastructure and improvements
- Panchayat Yuva Krida Aur Khel Abhiyan
- Promotion of Scouting & Guiding: The national headquarters of The Bharat Scouts and Guides (BSG), Hindustan scout and guide(HSG) and The scout guide organization (SGO) are recognised by the Government of India as the apex body in the field of Scouting and Guiding in India.
- Youth Hostels

=== Awards ===
- National Young Leaders Awards (NYLA)
- Tenzing Norgay National Adventure Award
- National Youth Awards
- National Service Scheme (NSS) Awards
- Awards to Outstanding Youth Clubs (NYKS)

== Department of Sports ==
The Department of Sports is a division of Ministry of Youth Affairs and Sports under Government of India created on 30 April 2008. They also helped in bringing the FIFA U-17 World cup to India. A huge part of it was played by the advisors to the Sports Ministry - Rahul Rana (Doon School) and Arjun Dewan (The Lawrence School).

=== Organisations ===
- Sports Authority of India
- National Anti Doping Agency (NADA)
- National Dope Testing Laboratory
- National Sports University, Imphal (Manipur)
- Lakshmibai National College of Physical Education (LNCPE), Thiruvananthapuram
- Lakshmibai National Institute of Physical Education (LNIPE), Gwalior (Madhya Pradesh)
- Rajiv Gandhi National Institute of Youth Development (RGNIYD), Sriperumbudur (Tamil Nadu)
- Netaji Subhas National Institute of Sports (NSNIS), Patiala (Punjab)
- Mera Yuva Bharat (MY Bharat), an autonomous body

=== Awards ===
- Dronacharya Award
- Arjuna Award
- Dhyan Chand Award
- Major Dhyan Chand Khel Ratna
- Rashtriya Khel Protsahan Puruskar
- Maulana Abul Kalam Azad Trophy

== Cabinet Ministers ==
- Note:
  - MoS, I/C – Minister of State (Independent Charge)

Portrait	Minister (Birth-Death) Constituency	Term of office			Political party	Ministry	Prime Minister
Portrait	Minister (Birth-Death) Constituency	From	To	Period	Political party	Ministry	Prime Minister
Minister of Sports
	Buta Singh (1934–2021); MP for Ropar (MoS, I/C until 29 January 1983)	2 September 1982	31 October 1984	2 years, 115 days	Indian National Congress (I)	Indira IV	Indira Gandhi
	Buta Singh (1934–2021); MP for Ropar (MoS, I/C until 29 January 1983)	4 November 1984	31 December 1984	2 years, 115 days	Indian National Congress (I)	Rajiv I	Rajiv Gandhi
	Rajiv Gandhi (1944–1991); MP for Amethi (Prime Minister)	31 December 1984	25 September 1985	268 days	Indian National Congress (I)	Rajiv II	Rajiv Gandhi
Ministry disestablished during this interval (Note: The ministry's competences were transferred to the Ministry of Human Resource Development in September 1985.)
Minister of Youth Affairs and Sports
	Uma Bharti (born 1959); MP for Bhopal (MoS, I/C)	1 March 1999	13 October 1999	226 days	Bharatiya Janata Party	Vajpayee II	Atal Bihari Vajpayee
	Ananth Kumar (1959–2018); MP for Bangalore South	13 October 1999	2 February 2000	112 days	Bharatiya Janata Party	Vajpayee III	Atal Bihari Vajpayee
	Sukhdev Singh Dhindsa (1936–2025); Rajya Sabha MP for Punjab	2 February 2000	7 November 2000	279 days	Shiromani Akali Dal	Vajpayee III	Atal Bihari Vajpayee
	Uma Bharti (born 1959); MP for Bhopal	7 November 2000	25 August 2002	1 year, 291 days	Bharatiya Janata Party	Vajpayee III	Atal Bihari Vajpayee
	Vikram Verma (born 1944); Rajya Sabha MP for Madhya Pradesh	26 August 2002	22 May 2004	1 year, 270 days	Bharatiya Janata Party	Vajpayee III	Atal Bihari Vajpayee
	Sunil Dutt (1929–2005); MP for Mumbai North West	23 May 2004	25 May 2005 (died in office)	1 year, 2 days	Indian National Congress	Manmohan I	Manmohan Singh
	Manmohan Singh (1932–2024); Rajya Sabha MP for Assam (Prime Minister)	25 May 2005	18 November 2005	177 days	Indian National Congress	Manmohan I	Manmohan Singh
	Oscar Fernandes (1941–2021); Rajya Sabha MP for Karnataka (MoS, I/C)	18 November 2005	29 January 2006	72 days	Indian National Congress	Manmohan I	Manmohan Singh
	Mani Shankar Aiyar (born 1941); MP for Mayiladuthurai	29 January 2006	6 April 2008	2 years, 68 days	Indian National Congress	Manmohan I	Manmohan Singh
	M. S. Gill (1936–2023); Rajya Sabha MP for Punjab (MoS, I/C until 22 May 2009)	6 April 2008	22 May 2009	1 year, 46 days	Indian National Congress	Manmohan I	Manmohan Singh
	M. S. Gill (1936–2023); Rajya Sabha MP for Punjab (MoS, I/C until 22 May 2009)	28 May 2009	19 January 2011	1 year, 236 days	Indian National Congress	Manmohan II	Manmohan Singh
	Ajay Maken (born 1964); MP for New Delhi (MoS, I/C)	19 January 2011	28 October 2012	1 year, 283 days	Indian National Congress	Manmohan II	Manmohan Singh
	Jitendra Singh (born 1971); MP for Alwar (MoS, I/C)	28 October 2012	26 May 2014	1 year, 180 days	Indian National Congress	Manmohan II	Manmohan Singh
Minister of Skill Development, Entrepreneurship, Youth Affairs and Sports
	Sarbananda Sonowal (born 1962); MP for Lakhimpur (MoS, I/C)	27 May 2014	9 November 2014	166 days	Bharatiya Janata Party	Modi I	Narendra Modi
Minister of Youth Affairs and Sports
	Sarbananda Sonowal (born 1962); MP for Lakhimpur (MoS, I/C)	9 November 2014	23 May 2016	1 year, 196 days	Bharatiya Janata Party	Modi I	Narendra Modi
	Jitendra Singh (born 1956); MP for Udhampur (MoS, I/C)	23 May 2016	5 July 2016	43 days	Bharatiya Janata Party	Modi I	Narendra Modi
	Vijay Goel (born 1954); Rajya Sabha MP for Rajasthan (MoS, I/C)	5 July 2016	3 September 2017	1 year, 60 days	Bharatiya Janata Party	Modi I	Narendra Modi
	Colonel; Rajyavardhan Singh Rathore; AVSM (born 1970); MP for Jaipur Rural (MoS, I/C)	3 September 2017	30 May 2019	1 year, 269 days	Bharatiya Janata Party	Modi I	Narendra Modi
	Kiren Rijiju (born 1971); MP for Arunachal West (MoS, I/C)	31 May 2019	7 July 2021	2 years, 37 days	Bharatiya Janata Party	Modi II	Narendra Modi
	Anurag Singh Thakur (born 1974); MP for Hamirpur	7 July 2021	9 June 2024	2 years, 338 days	Bharatiya Janata Party	Modi II	Narendra Modi
	Mansukh Mandaviya (born 1972); MP for Porbandar	10 June 2024	Incumbent	2 years, 157 days	Bharatiya Janata Party	Modi III	Narendra Modi

== Ministers of State ==
Portrait	Minister (Birth-Death) Constituency	Term of office			Political party	Ministry	Prime Minister
Portrait	Minister (Birth-Death) Constituency	From	To	Period	Political party	Ministry	Prime Minister
Minister of State for Sports
	Rajkumar Jaichandra Singh (born 1942); Rajya Sabha MP for Manipur	31 December 1984	25 September 1985	268 days	Indian National Congress (I)	Rajiv II	Rajiv Gandhi
Minister of State for Youth Affairs and Sports
	Thounaojam Chaoba Singh (born 1937); MP for Inner Manipur	13 October 1999	27 May 2000	227 days	Bharatiya Janata Party	Vajpayee III	Atal Bihari Vajpayee
	Syed Shahnawaz Hussain (born 1968); MP for Kishanganj	27 May 2000	30 September 2000	126 days	Bharatiya Janata Party	Vajpayee III	Atal Bihari Vajpayee
	Pon Radhakrishnan (born 1952); MP for Kanniyakumari	30 September 2000	29 January 2003	2 years, 121 days	Bharatiya Janata Party	Vajpayee III	Atal Bihari Vajpayee
	Vijay Goel (born 1954); MP for Chandni Chowk	24 May 2003	22 May 2004	364 days	Bharatiya Janata Party	Vajpayee III	Atal Bihari Vajpayee
	Arun Subhashchandra Yadav (born 1974); MP for Khandwa	28 May 2009	14 June 2009	17 days	Indian National Congress	Manmohan II	Manmohan Singh
	Pratik Prakashbapu Patil (born 1973); MP for Sangli	14 June 2009	19 January 2011	1 year, 219 days	Indian National Congress	Manmohan II	Manmohan Singh
	Nisith Pramanik (born 1986); MP for Cooch Behar	7 July 2021	9 June 2024	2 years, 338 days	Bharatiya Janata Party	Modi II	Narendra Modi
	Raksha Khadse (born 1987); MP for Raver	10 June 2024	Incumbent	2 years, 157 days	Bharatiya Janata Party	Modi III	Narendra Modi

== See also ==
- Ministry of Sports
- Sport in India - overview of Sports
- Various national level sport governing bodies in India
- India at the Olympics
- Mera Yuva Bharat (My Bharat)
- National Sports Governance Act, 2025
