= Sakri, Kangra =

Coordinates: 32.038°N 76.122°E

Sakri is a village located in Fatehpur Tehsil of Kangra district in Himachal Pradesh, India. Rehan is the nearest town to this village. The pin code of this village is 176022.
