= Olympic Charter =

Governing articles for the Olympic Games

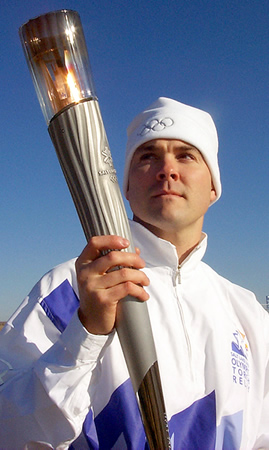
Olympic torch

The Olympic Charter is a set of rules and guidelines for the organisation of the Olympic Games, and for governing the Olympic Movement. Its last revision was on the 17th of July 2020 during the 136th IOC Session, held by video conference. Adopted by the International Olympic Committee (IOC), it is the official codification of the fundamental principles, rules and by-laws. French and English are the official languages of the Olympic Charter.

== Purpose ==
Throughout the history of the Olympics, the Olympic Charter has often decided the outcome of Olympic controversy. As expressed in its introduction, the Olympic Charter serves three main purposes:

- to establish principles and values of Olympism
- to serve as IOC law
- to define the rights and obligations of the three main constituents of the Olympic movement: the International Olympic Committee (IOC), the International Federations and the National Olympic Committees.

== Main components ==
With its 6 chapters and 61 articles, the Olympic Charter outlines in detail several guidelines and rules. This article highlights and summarises those items considered most important to governing the Olympic Games, the Olympic movement, and its three main constituents: the International Olympic Committee, the International Federations, and the National Olympic Committees.

=== Chapter 1: The Olympic Movement and its Action ===
Article 2: The mission of the IOC is to promote Olympism throughout the world and to lead the Olympic Movement. This includes upholding ethics in sports, encouraging participation in sports, ensuring the Olympic Games take place on a regular period, protecting the Olympic Movement, and encouraging and supporting the development of sport.

Article 6: The Olympic Games are competitions between athletes in individual or team events and not between countries.

Article 8: The Olympic symbol consists of five interlocking rings which, from left to right are blue, yellow, black, green and red.

=== Chapter 2: The International Olympic Committee (IOC) ===
This chapter outlines the membership, meetings, and guiding doctrines of the International Olympic Committee (IOC).

=== Chapter 3: The International Federations (IFs) ===
Chapter 3 discusses the role of International Federations (IFs) in the Olympic movement. IFs are international non-governmental organisations that administer to sports at the world level and encompass organisations administering such sports at the national level. For each sport that is part of the Olympic Games, an International Federation exists. These IFs work to ensure their sports are developed in a way that agrees with the Olympic Charter and the Olympic spirit. With technical expertise in its particular sport, an IF has control over eligibility for competition as well as details of the venue in which the athletic competition takes place.

=== Chapter 4: The National Olympic Committees (NOCs) ===
Article 28: The mission of the National Olympic Committees (NOCs) is to develop, promote and protect the Olympic Movement in their respective countries. The role of NOCs within each country is to promote the spirit of Olympicism, ensure the observance of the Olympic Charter, and to encourage ethics in and development of sports. They are in charge of their country's representation at the Games, deciding on a host city for the Games, and cooperation with governmental and non-governmental bodies during the Games.

=== Chapter 5: The Olympic Games ===
This chapter addresses the celebration of the Olympic Games, the selection of the host city, the eligibility code for participation in the games, those sports included in the Games, media coverage, publications, and propaganda allowed for the Games.

In addition, Section 3 of this chapter discusses applicable protocol for Olympic functions and events. This includes an outline of use of the Olympic flag, flame, and opening and closing ceremonies. The five rings of the Olympic games signify the five continents.

=== Chapter 6: Measures and Sanctions, Disciplinary Procedures and Dispute Resolution ===
This chapter addresses (Measures and Sanctions, Disciplinary Procedures and Dispute Resolution)

- Rule: 59 – Measures and sanctions
- Rule : 60 – Challenging IOC decisions
- Rule : 61 – Dispute resolution

== Fundamental Principles of Olympism ==
1. Olympism is a philosophy of life, exalting and combining in a balanced whole the qualities of body, will and mind. Blending sport with culture and education, Olympism seeks to create a way of life based on the joy of effort, the educational value of good example, social responsibility and respect for universal fundamental ethical principles.
2. The goal of Olympism is to place sport at the service of the harmonious development of humankind, with a view to promoting a peaceful society concerned with the preservation of human dignity.
3. The Olympic Movement is the concerted, organised, universal and permanent action, carried out under the supreme authority of the IOC, of all individuals and entities who are inspired by the values of Olympism. It covers the five continents. It reaches its peak with the bringing together of the world's athletes at the great sports festival, the Olympic Games. Its symbol is five interlaced rings.
4. The practice of sport is a human right. Every individual must have the possibility of practising sport, without discrimination of any kind and in the Olympic spirit, which requires mutual understanding with a spirit of friendship, solidarity and fair play.
5. Recognising that sport occurs within the framework of society, sports organisations within the Olympic Movement shall have the rights and obligations of autonomy, which include freely establishing and controlling the rules of sport, determining the structure and governance of their organisations, enjoying the right of elections free from any outside influence and the responsibility for ensuring that principles of good governance be applied.
6. The enjoyment of the rights and freedoms set forth in this Olympic Charter shall be secured without discrimination of any kind, such as race, colour, sex, sexual orientation, language, religion, political or other opinion, national or social origin, property, birth or other status.
7. Belonging to the Olympic Movement requires compliance with the Olympic Charter and recognition by the IOC.

== In the media ==
The Olympic Charter is not simply a matter of unenforced policy for the Olympic Games. Throughout history, it has served as guidance for the proceedings of the Games. Below are a few of the most recent examples:

- 2011 – 2012: Human Rights Watch accused Saudi Arabia of contravening the Olympic Charter by systematically preventing women from practising sports in the country, and by not allowing Saudi women athletes to take part in the Olympic Games, thus violating the fourth, sixth and seventh fundamental principles of the Charter, which every member of the Olympic Movement is bound to. This came as Anita DeFrantz, chair of the IOC's Women and Sports Commission, suggested that the country be barred from participating in the Olympics until it agrees to send women athletes to the Games. IOC spokeswoman Emmanuelle Moreau, however, indicated that the Committee "would not mandate that the Saudis have female representation in London", arguing that "the IOC does not give ultimatums nor deadlines but rather believes that a lot can be achieved through dialogue".
- 2012: The Lebanese judo team at the 2012 London Olympics refused to practice next to the Israeli one, and a makeshift barrier was erected to split their gym into two halves. Due to the alphabetical order of the English language, the two teams were scheduled to use the same mats at the ExCel to finalize their preparations. However, due the Lebanese constitution, the athletes would not train in view of the Israeli team, and insisted some sort of barrier be placed between them. Organisers accepted the Lebanese coach's demand to separate the teams, erecting a barrier so that the Lebanese team would not see the Israeli athletes.

== Olympic Congress ==
The Olympic Congress is organized by the IOC. The Congress include representatives of the constituents of the Olympic Movement. The date and place of the Olympic Congress is determined by the Session. The Session also determines the duties of the president of the Congress. The Olympic Congress' participants are the members, Honorary President, honorary members and honour members of the IOC, the delegates representing the IFs and the NOCs. The representatives of the organizations recognized by the IOC may also take place at the Congress.

== See also ==
- FIFA Disciplinary Code
- List of international sport federations
- National Sports Governance Act, 2025
