= Rajiv Gandhi National Institute of Youth Development =

Government Institute in India

- Type: Institute of National Importance
- Established: 1993; 33 years ago 2012; 14 years ago (Institute of National Importance)
- Chairperson: Secretary, Department of Youth Affairs, Government of India
- Director: Subrata Hazra
- Visitor: President of India
- Location: Sriperumbudur, Chennai, Tamil Nadu, India
- Campus: 42 acres
- Website: rgniyd.gov.in

The Rajiv Gandhi National Institute of Youth Development (RGNIYD), Sriperumbudur, Tamil Nadu, is an Institution of National Importance by the Act of Parliament No. 35/2012 under the Ministry of Youth Affairs & Sports, Government of India. The RGNIYD was established in 1993 under the Societies Registration Act (XXVII of 1975).

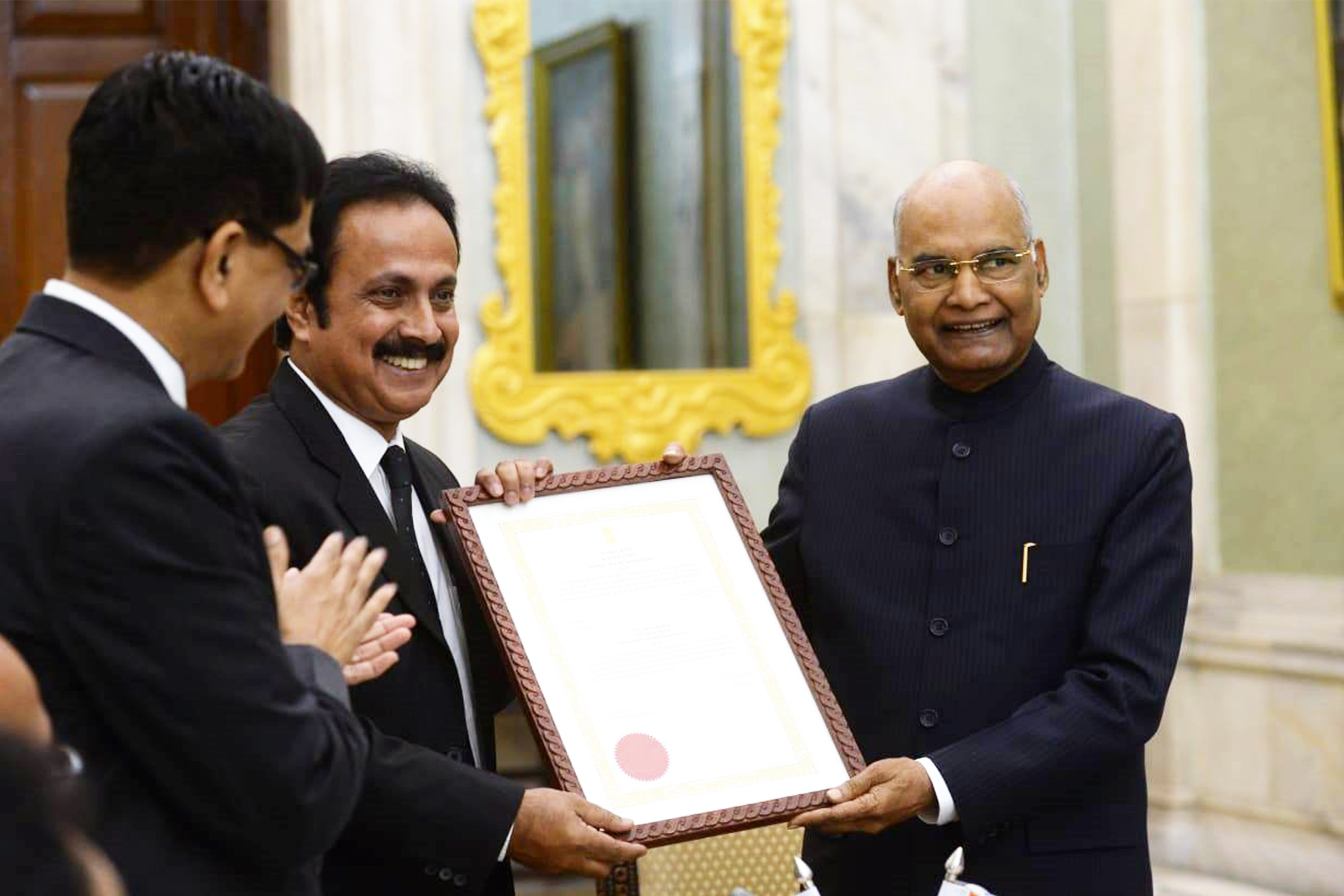

The RGNIYD offers postgraduate academic programs in youth development, conducts research in this field, and coordinates training programs for state agencies and youth organization officials. It actively participates in extension and outreach initiatives nationwide. The institute serves as a think-tank for the Ministry and as an organizer of youth-related activities. It collaborates with the NSS, NYKS, and other youth organizations to implement training programs.

The institute also provides postgraduate degree programs in fields such as Gender Studies, Development Studies, Local Governance, Counselling Psychology, Social Innovation and Entrepreneurship, and Social Work. It additionally offers PhD programs in various social science disciplines.

RGNIYD is India’s first institute focused on youth development, with a vision to enhance the potential of the nation’s youth. RGNIYD is South Asia’s first institute dedicated to addressing youth issues and promoting youth development prospects. The institute has developed India’s first "India Youth Development Index", which was entirely prepared by RGNIYD.
