= National Anti-Doping Agency (India) =

Details about NADA

- Formation: 24 November 2005; 20 years ago
- Type: Non-profit
- Headquarters: New Delhi, India
- Region served: National
- Official language: English; Hindi
- Chairman: Minister of Sports (India)
- Director General: Ashish Bhargava, IAS
- Affiliations: Indian Olympic Committee
- Website: nadaindia.org

The National Anti-Doping Agency of India is India's national organisation responsible for promoting, coordinating, and monitoring the doping control program in sports in all its forms.

As listed on its official web portal, the agency deals with adopting and implementing anti-doping rules and policies which conform with the World Anti-Doping Agency, cooperates with other anti-doping organisations and promotes anti-doping research and education.

The agency is formed by the Union Government under National anti doping Act 2022 and includes scientists and representatives from the Indian Olympic Association.
