= List of National Sports Award recipients in cricket =

National Sports Awards in Cricket
- Various civilian awards for contributions to Sports (Individual/Team)
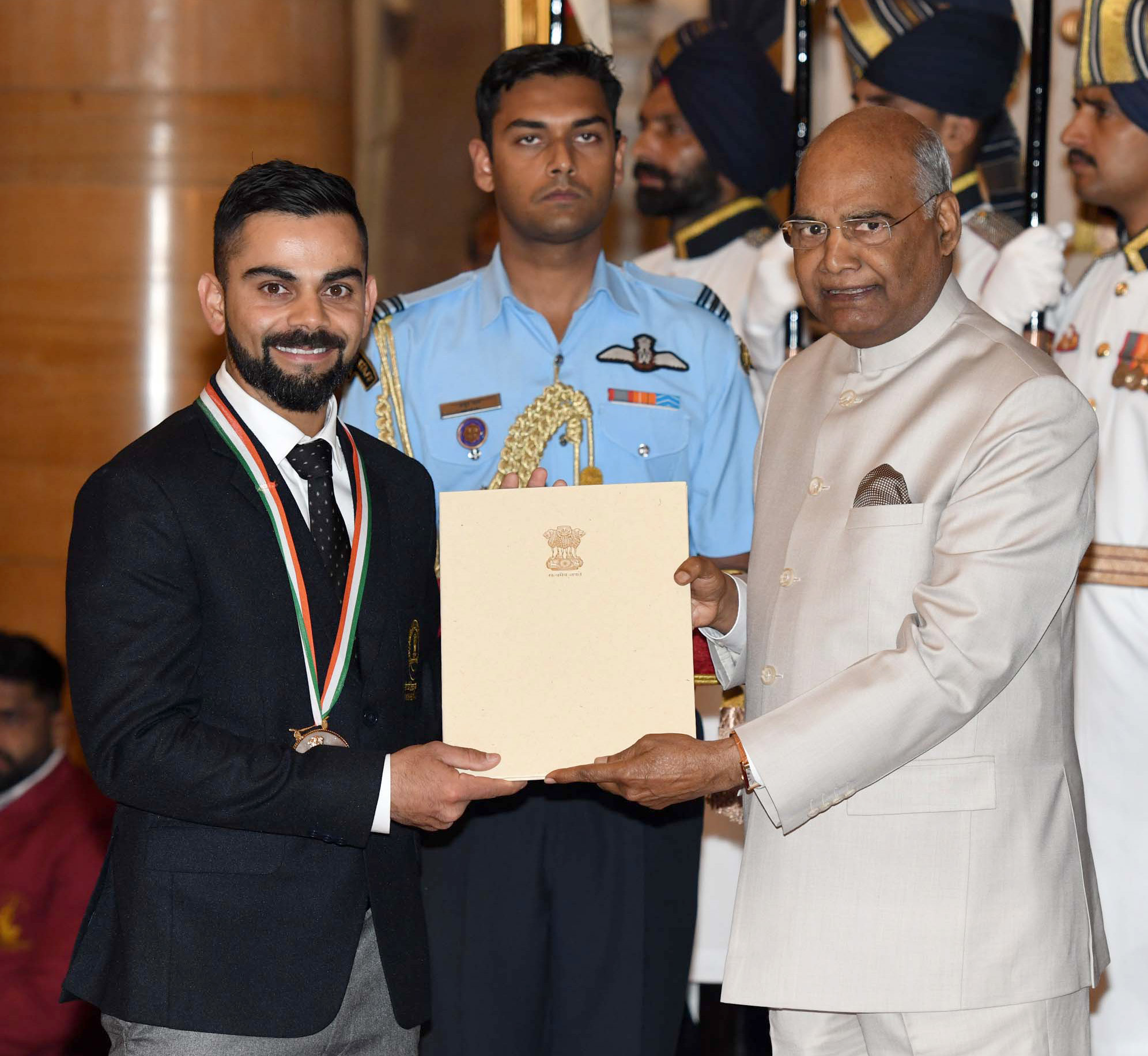
- Awarded for: Various sports honour of India
- Sponsored by: Government of India
- Location: Rashtrapati Bhavan
- Country: Republic of India
- Presented by: President of India
- First award: 1961
- Final award: 2022

Highlights
- Total awarded: 71
- Awards: Arjuna Award; Dronacharya Award; Khel Ratna; Dhyan Chand Award

The National Sports Awards is the collective name given to the six sports awards of Republic of India. It is awarded annually by the Ministry of Youth Affairs and Sports. They are presented by the President of India in the same ceremony at the Rashtrapati Bhavan usually on 29 August each year along with the national adventure award. As of 2020, a total of sixty-seven individuals have been awarded the various National Sports Awards in cricket. The four awards presented in cricket are Rajiv Gandhi Khel Ratna, Arjuna Award, Dhyan Chand Award and Dronacharya Award.

First presented in the year 1961, a total of fifty-six individuals have been honoured with the Arjuna Award in cricket for their "good performance at the international level" over the period of last four years First presented in the year 1986, a total of seven coaches have been honoured with the Dronacharya Award in cricket for their "outstanding work on a consistent basis and enabling sportspersons to excel in international events" over the period of last four years, with two coaches being awarded in the lifetime contribution category. First presented in the year 1997–1998, a total of four sportspersons have been honoured with the Rajiv Gandhi Khel Ratna, the highest sporting honour of India, in cricket for their "most outstanding performance at the international level" over the period of last four years.

== Recipients ==
As of 2020, four cricketers have been awarded the highest sporting award, the Rajiv Gandhi Khel Ratna. The first recipient was Sachin Tendulkar, considered one of the greatest batsmen of all time according to the Encyclopedia Britannica, and the first cricketer to score 100 centuries in international competition. He was presented with the Arjuna Award in the year 1994 and the Rajiv Gandhi Khel Ratna award in the year 1997–1998. He is also the highest run scorer of all time in International cricket and the first sportsperson to be awarded the Bharat Ratna, India's highest civilian award in 2014.

The second recipient, MS Dhoni, is the former captain of the Indian national team in limited-overs formats from 2007 to 2016 and in Test cricket from 2008 to 2014. Under his captaincy, India won the inaugural 2007 ICC World Twenty20, the 2011 ICC Cricket World Cup and the 2013 ICC Champions Trophy. He was a wicket-keeper and one of the highest run scorers in One Day Internationals of all time. He was presented with the Rajiv Gandhi Khel Ratna award in the year 2007. In 2016, a sport biopic M.S. Dhoni: The Untold Story based on his life was released.

The third recipient is Virat Kohli. He was ICC player of the year multiple times. Currently, Kohli is the 4th leading run-scorer of all time with close to 27324 runs, and has notched up 81 international hundreds. In 2020, the ICC had named Kohli the Player of the Decade. He has the most ODI centuries in world with 50 centuries.

Rohit Sharma, the fourth recipient, a former cricket captain in all formats, hit 264, the highest individual score in ODI format. He also became the first and only cricketer to hit 5 centuries in a single World Cup during 2019 World Cup. He is also the only cricketer to hit three double centuries in an ODI.

List of National Sports award recipients, showing the year, award and gender
Year	Recipient	Award	Gender
1961	Salim Durani	Arjuna Award	Male
1964	Mansoor Ali Khan Pataudi	Arjuna Award	Male
1965	Vijay Manjrekar	Arjuna Award	Male
1966	Chandu Borde	Arjuna Award	Male
1967	Ajit Wadekar	Arjuna Award	Male
1968	E. A. S. Prasanna	Arjuna Award	Male
1969	Bishan Singh Bedi	Arjuna Award	Male
1970	Dilip Sardesai	Arjuna Award	Male
1971	Srinivasaraghavan Venkataraghavan	Arjuna Award	Male
1972	B. S. Chandrashekhar	Arjuna Award	Male
1972	Eknath Solkar	Arjuna Award	Male
1975	Sunil Gavaskar	Arjuna Award	Male
1976	Shantha Rangaswamy	Arjuna Award	Female
1977–1978	Gundappa Viswanath	Arjuna Award	Male
1979–1980	Kapil Dev	Arjuna Award	Male
1980–1981	Chetan Chauhan	Arjuna Award	Male
1980–1981	Syed Kirmani	Arjuna Award	Male
1981	Dilip Vengsarkar	Arjuna Award	Male
1982	Mohinder Amarnath	Arjuna Award	Male
1983	Diana Edulji	Arjuna Award	Female
1984	Ravi Shastri	Arjuna Award	Male
1985	Shubhangi Kulkarni	Arjuna Award	Female
1986	Sandhya Agarwal	Arjuna Award	Female
1986	Mohammad Azharuddin	Arjuna Award	Male
1986	Desh Prem Azad	Dronacharya Award	Male
1987	Gurcharan Singh	Dronacharya Award	Male
1989	Madan Lal	Arjuna Award	Male
1990	Ramakant Achrekar	Dronacharya Award	Male
1993	Kiran More	Arjuna Award	Male
1993	Manoj Prabhakar	Arjuna Award	Male
1994	Sachin Tendulkar	Arjuna Award	Male
1995	Anil Kumble	Arjuna Award	Male
1996	Javagal Srinath	Arjuna Award	Male
1997	Sourav Ganguly	Arjuna Award	Male
1997	Ajay Jadeja	Arjuna Award	Male
1997–1998	Sachin Tendulkar	Rajiv Gandhi Khel Ratna	Male
1998	Rahul Dravid	Arjuna Award	Male
1998	Nayan Mongia	Arjuna Award	Male
2000	Venkatesh Prasad	Arjuna Award	Male
2001	VVS Laxman	Arjuna Award	Male
2002	Virender Sehwag	Arjuna Award	Male
2003	Harbhajan Singh	Arjuna Award	Male
2004	Sunita Sharma	Dronacharya Award	Female
2005	Anju Jain	Arjuna Award	Female
2006	Anjum Chopra	Arjuna Award	Female
2007	Mahendra Singh Dhoni	Rajiv Gandhi Khel Ratna	Male
2009	Gautam Gambhir	Arjuna Award	Male
2010	Jhulan Goswami	Arjuna Award	Female
2011	Zaheer Khan	Arjuna Award	Male
2012	Yuvraj Singh	Arjuna Award	Male
2013	Virat Kohli	Arjuna Award	Male
2014	Ravichandran Ashwin	Arjuna Award	Male
2015	Rohit Sharma	Arjuna Award	Male
2016	Ajinkya Rahane	Arjuna Award	Male
2016	Rajkumar Sharma	Dronacharya Award	Male
2017	Harmanpreet Kaur	Arjuna Award	Female
2017	Cheteshwar Pujara	Arjuna Award	Male
2018	Virat Kohli	Rajiv Gandhi Khel Ratna	Male
2018	Smriti Mandhana	Arjuna Award	Female
2018	Tarak Sinha ^{+}	Dronacharya Award	Male
2019	Ravindra Jadeja	Arjuna Award	Male
2019	Poonam Yadav	Arjuna Award	Female
2019	Sanjay Bhardwaj ^{+}	Dronacharya Award	Male
2020	Rohit Sharma	Rajiv Gandhi Khel Ratna	Male
2020	Deepti Sharma	Arjuna Award	Female
2020	Ishant Sharma	Arjuna Award	Male
2021	Mithali Raj	Major Dhyan Chand Khel Ratna	Female
2021	Sarkar Talwar ^{+}	Dronacharya Award	Male
2021	Shikhar Dhawan	Arjuna Award	Male
2022	Dinesh Jawahar Lad ^{+}	Dronacharya Award	Male
2023	Mohammed Shami	Arjuna Award	Male
