= List of National Sports Award recipients in boxing =

National Sports Awards in Boxing
- Various civilian awards for contributions to Sports (Individual/Team)
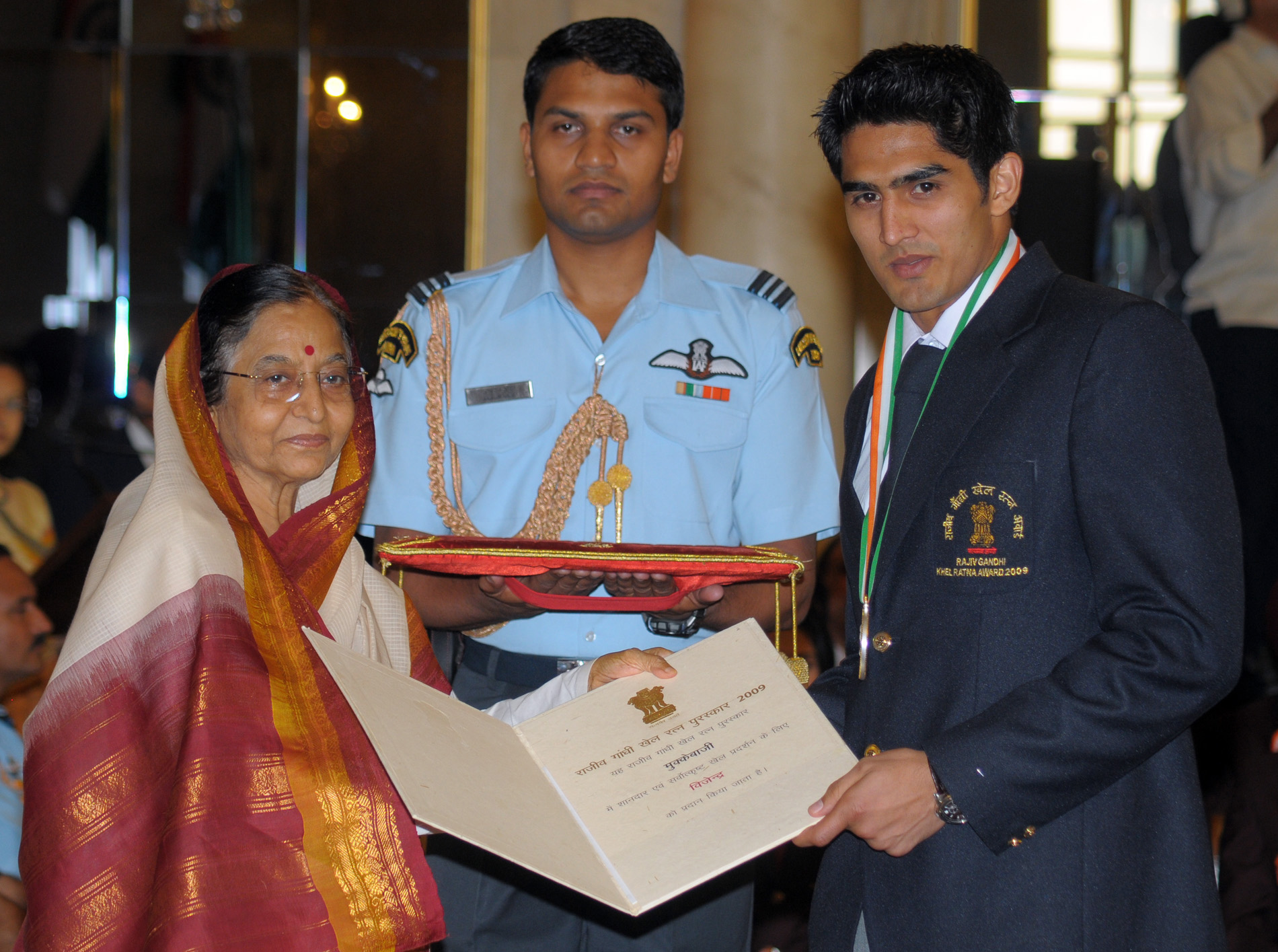
- Awarded for: Various sports honour of India
- Sponsored by: Government of India
- Location: Rashtrapati Bhavan
- Country: Republic of India
- Presented by: President of India
- First award: 1961
- Final award: 2024

Highlights
- Total awarded: 78
- Awards: Arjuna Award; Dronacharya Award; Major Dhyan Chand Khel Ratna; Dhyan Chand Award

The National Sports Awards is the collective name given to the six sports awards of Republic of India. It is awarded annually by the Ministry of Youth Affairs and Sports. They are presented by the President of India in the same ceremony at the Rashtrapati Bhavan usually on 29 August each year along with the national adventure award. As of 2024, a total of seveny-eight individuals have been awarded the various National Sports Awards in boxing. The four awards presented in boxing are Rajiv Gandhi Khel Ratna, Arjuna Award, Dhyan Chand Award and Dronacharya Award.

First presented in the year 1961, a total of fifty-one individuals have been honoured with the Arjuna Award in boxing for their "good performance at the international level" over the period of last four years. First presented in the year 1985, a total of seventeen coaches have been honoured with the Dronacharya Award in boxing for their "outstanding work on a consistent basis and enabling sportspersons to excel in international events" over the period of last four years, with four coaches being awarded in the lifetime contribution category. First presented in the year 2009, a total of three sportspersons have been honoured with the Rajiv Gandhi Khel Ratna, the highest sporting honour of India, in boxing for their "most outstanding performance at the international level" over the period of last four years. First presented in the year 2002, a total of four retired sportspersons have been honoured with the Dhyan Chand Award, the lifetime achievement sporting honour of India, in boxing for their "good performance at the international level and their continued contributions to the promotion of sports even after their career as a sportsperson is over." One awardee Hawa Singh was honoured Dronacharya Award posthumously in the year 1999.

== Recipients ==
Key
| + Indicates a Lifetime contribution honour | # Indicates a posthumous honour |

List of National Sports award recipients, showing the year, award and gender
| Year | Recipient | Award | Gender |
|---|---|---|---|
| 2009 | Mary Kom | Rajiv Gandhi Khel Ratna | Female |
| 2009 | Vijender Singh | Rajiv Gandhi Khel Ratna | Male |
| 2021 | Lovlina Borgohain | Major Dhyan Chand Khel Ratna | Female |
| 1961 | Buddy D'Souza | Arjuna Award | Male |
| 1962 | Padam Badadur Mal | Arjuna Award | Male |
| 1966 | Hawa Singh | Arjuna Award | Male |
| 1968 | Dennis Swamy | Arjuna Award | Male |
| 1971 | Muniswamy Venu | Arjuna Award | Male |
| 1972 | Chandraya Narayanan | Arjuna Award | Male |
| 1973 | Mehtab Singh | Arjuna Award | Male |
| 1977–1978 | Birender Singh Thapa | Arjuna Award | Male |
| 1978–1979 | C. C. Machaiah | Arjuna Award | Male |
| 1979–1980 | Bakshish Singh | Arjuna Award | Male |
| 1980–1981 | Issac Amaldas | Arjuna Award | Male |
| 1981 | G. Manoharan | Arjuna Award | Male |
| 1982 | Kaur Singh | Arjuna Award | Male |
| 1983 | Jaslal Pradhan | Arjuna Award | Male |
| 1986 | Jaipal Singh | Arjuna Award | Male |
| 1987 | Seeva Jayaram | Arjuna Award | Male |
| 1989 | Gopal Dewang | Arjuna Award | Male |
| 1991 | Dharmendra Singh Yadav | Arjuna Award | Male |
| 1992 | Rajendra Prasad | Boxing | Male |
| 1993 | Mukund Killekar | Arjuna Award | Male |
| 1993 | Manoj Pingale | Arjuna Award | Male |
| 1995 | Venkatesan Devarajan | Arjuna Award | Male |
| 1996 | Rajkumar Sangwan | Arjuna Award | Male |
| 1998 | Dingko Singh | Arjuna Award | Male |
| 1999 | Jitender Kumar | Arjuna Award | Male |
| 1999 | Gurcharan Singh | Arjuna Award | Male |
| 2002 | Mohammed Ali Qamar | Arjuna Award | Male |
| 2003 | Mary Kom | Arjuna Award | Female |
| 2005 | Akhil Kumar | Arjuna Award | Male |
| 2006 | Vijender Singh | Arjuna Award | Male |
| 2007 | Varghese Johnson | Arjuna Award | Male |
| 2009 | Laishram Sarita Devi | Arjuna Award | Female |
| 2010 | Dinesh Kumar | Arjuna Award | Male |
| 2011 | Suranjoy Singh | Arjuna Award | Male |
| 2012 | Vikas Krishan Yadav | Arjuna Award | Male |
| 2013 | Kavita Chahal | Arjuna Award | Female |
| 2014 | Jai Bhagwan | Arjuna Award | Male |
| 2014 | Manoj Kumar | Arjuna Award | Male |
| 2015 | Mandeep Jangra | Arjuna Award | Male |
| 2016 | Shiva Thapa | Arjuna Award | Male |
| 2017 | Devendro Singh | Arjuna Award | Male |
| 2018 | Satish Kumar | Arjuna Award | Male |
| 2019 | Sonia Lather | Arjuna Award | Female |
| 2020 | Lovlina Borgohain | Arjuna Award | Female |
| 2020 | Manish Kaushik | Arjuna Award | Male |
| 2021 | Simranjit Kaur | Arjuna Award | Female |
| 2022 | Amit Panghal | Arjuna Award | Male |
| 2022 | Nikhat Zareen | Arjuna Award | Female |
| 2023 | Mohammad Hussamuddin | Arjuna Award | Male |
| 2024 | Nitu Ghanghas | Arjuna Award | Female |
| 2024 | Saweety Boora | Arjuna Award | Female |
| 2002 | Shahuraj Birajdar | Dhyan Chand Award | Male |
| 2020 | Lakha Singh | Dhyan Chand Award | Male |
| 2020 | N. Usha | Dhyan Chand Award | Female |
| 2021 | Lekha K. C. | Dhyan Chand Award | Female |
| 2014 | Ganapathy Manoharan ^{+} | Dronacharya Award | Male |
| 2015 | Swatantar Raj Singh ^{+} | Dronacharya Award | Male |
| 2017 | Brij Bhushan Mohanty ^{+} | Dronacharya Award | Male |
| 2020 | Shiv Singh ^{+} | Dronacharya Award | Male |
| 1985 | Om Prakash Bhardwaj | Dronacharya Award | Male |
| 1998 | G. S. Sandhu | Dronacharya Award | Male |
| 1999 | Hawa Singh ^{+} | Dronacharya Award | Male |
| 2003 | Anoop Kumar | Dronacharya Award | Male |
| 2005 | M. Venu | Dronacharya Award | Male |
| 2006 | Damodaran Chandralal | Dronacharya Award | Male |
| 2007 | Jagdish Singh | Dronacharya Award | Male |
| 2009 | Jaydev Bisht | Dronacharya Award | Male |
| 2010 | L Ibomcha Singh | Dronacharya Award | Male |
| 2011 | Inukurthi Venkateshwara Roy | Dronacharya Award | Male |
| 2012 | B. I. Fernandez | Dronacharya Award | Male |
| 2013 | Mahavir Singh | Dronacharya Award | Male |
| 2016 | Sagar Mal Dhayal | Dronacharya Award | Male |
| 2018 | Subedar Chenanda Achaiah Kuttappa | Dronacharya Award | Male |
| 2021 | Sandhya Gurung | Dronacharya Award | Female |
| 2022 | Mohammed Ali Qamar | Dronacharya Award | Male |
