= Gurcharan Singh (cricketer) =

Indian cricketer and coach

Personal information
- Full name: Gurcharan Singh
- Born: 13 June 1935 (age 91); Lahore, Punjab, British India
- Batting: Right-handed
- Bowling: Right-arm off break

Domestic team information
- Years: Team
- 1953/54–1958/59: Patiala
- 1956/57: Patiala and Eastern Punjab States Union
- 1959/60–1965/66: Southern Punjab
- 1963/64–1968/69: Railways

Career statistics
Competition	FC
Matches	37
Runs scored	1,198
Batting average	19.96
100s/50s	1/7
Top score	122
Balls bowled	2,870
Wickets	44
Bowling average	33.50
5 wickets in innings	0
10 wickets in match	0
Best bowling	4/20
Catches/stumpings	27/1
- Source: ESPNcricinfo, 4 September 2019

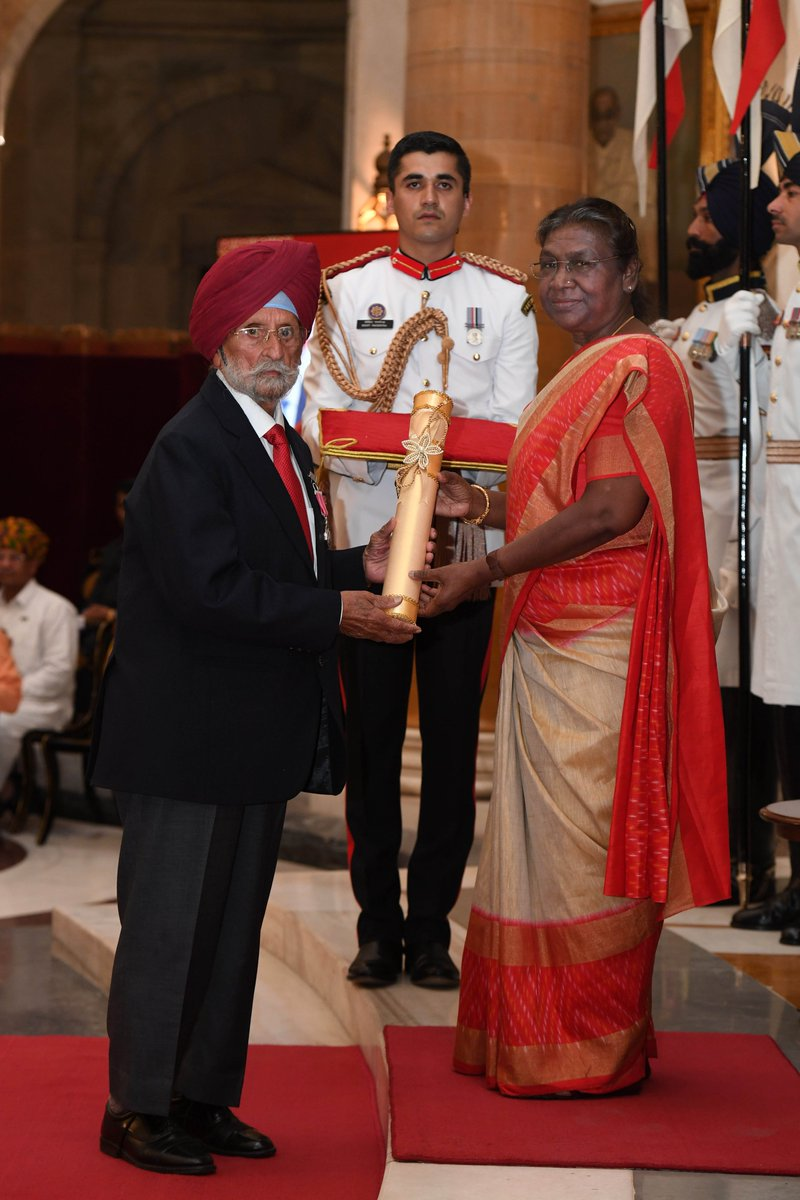
President Droupadi Murmu presents the Padma Shri to Singh.

Gurcharan Singh (born 13 June 1935) is an Indian cricket coach and former first-class cricketer. He coached 12 international and over 100 first-class cricketers, and is the second cricket coach to be awarded the Dronacharya Award. He was also awarded the fourth highest civilian award Padma Shri by the Indian government.

== Life and career ==
Born in Lahore on 13 June 1935, Singh came to Patiala as a refugee during the Partition of India in 1947. He started playing cricket under the guidance of Maharaja of Patiala Yadavindra Singh.

Singh was a right-handed batsman and right-arm off break bowler who appeared in 37 first-class matches. The teams he represented include Patiala, Patiala and Eastern Punjab States Union, Southern Punjab and Railways.

Singh obtained a coaching diploma from National Institute of Sports in Patiala and became a coach there. He then became head coach at the Sports Authority of India centre in New Delhi. Some of his notable coaching assignments include coach of North Zone between 1977 and 1983, head coach of Maldives in 1985 and coach of India national team from 1986 to 1987. During his tenure in Delhi, Singh survived the anti-Sikh riots in 1984 with the help of his trainees. In 1992/93, he became director of Pace Bowling Academy, jointly started by Laxmibhai National College of Physical Education and the Board of Control for Cricket in India, in Gwalior.

Singh started the Dronacharya Cricket Foundation in Delhi. As of 2012, he runs two cricket clubs called Delhi Blues (known as Veterans Club before 1987) and National Stadium Cricket Centre, taking the former on cricket tours to England every two years. In addition to more than 100 first-class cricketers, he coached 12 international cricketers including Maninder Singh, Surinder Khanna, Kirti Azad, Vivek Razdan, Gursharan Singh, Ajay Jadeja, Rahul Sanghvi and Murali Kartik. Among the schools at which he trained cricketers are Air Force Bal Bharati School, Sardar Patel Vidyalaya, St. Columba's School, Arwachin Bharti School and Khalsa College.

In 1987, he became the second cricket coach, after Desh Prem Azad (awarded in 1986), to be awarded the Dronacharya Award, India's highest sport coaching honour.
