= Sunita Sharma =

Sunita Sharma may refer to:

- Sunita Sharma (cricket coach)
- Sunita Sharma (gymnast)
- Sunita Sharma (Big Brother contestant)
