= Prabhakar Vaidya =

Indian educationist and academic

- Born: Amravati, Maharashtra, India
- Occupation: Physical educationist
- Spouse: Sudha
- Children: Madhuri, Sandeep, Deepa
- Awards: Padma Shri (2012)
- Website: www.hvpm.org

Prabhakar Vaidya is an Indian physical educationist, academic and the honorary secretary of Hanuman Vyayam Prasarak Mandal, a century-old organization and a national institution working towards modernizing the traditional systems of Sports & Games. He was honored by the Government of India, in 2012, with the fourth highest Indian civilian award of Padma Shri.

== Biography ==
Prabhakar Vaidya was born in Amravati in the Indian state of Maharashtra. He graduated in Physical Education from the renowned Lakshmibai National University of Physical Education, Gwalior in 1960 and later secured a master's degree from the same university, in 1966. Vaidya started his career as a member of the faculty of HVP Mandal College of Physical Education in 1967 where he spent his entire career as a teacher of physical education. He retired from academic teaching in 1992 as the Principal of the college.

Vaidya is the honorary secretary of Hanuman Vyayam Prasarak Mandal, in Amravati. The organization, started in 1914 is a national institution in sports and physical healthcare. He is the founder president of the National Association of Physical Education and Sports Science (NAPESS) and has held the post of vice president of Maharashtra State Association of Sports Medicine and Maharashtra State Gymnastic Association. He has also been the Chief Commissioner of Amravati chapter of Bharat Scouts and Guides, and a member of the International Council of Higher Physical Education and Recreation, New York and the International Association of Colleges of Physical Education, Spain.

Prabhakar Vaidya is a former chairman of the Maharashtra State Board of Studies of Physical Education (1983–1986) and has been a member of the Academic Council of Nagpur University (1979–1981) and Amravati University. He has also been a member of various bodies under the Maharashtra State Board of Secondary and Higher Secondary Education from 1986 to 1990. He has represented India at the World Lingiad Festival at Stock Holm, Sweden (1949) and the III World Congress of Physical Education at Istanbul, Turkey (1953). He has also presented demonstrations of traditional Indian physical culture at various countries such as Germany (1949), Turkey, Iran, Iraq and Syria (1953).

Prabhakar Vaidya is married to Sudha and the couple lives in Amravati, Maharashtra.

== Awards and recognitions ==
Prabhakar Vaidya is a recipient of three Maharashtra State awards, Shiv Chhatrapati Award (1976), Best Teacher award (1987) and Shiv Chhatrapati Jiwan Gaurav Puraskar, (2006) which is the highest award by the Government of Maharashtra in the sports category. He has also received the Best Old Student award (1991) from the Lakshmibai National University of Physical Education, Karmavir Kannamwar award (1998), Dadaji Didolkar award (2002), Paul Harris Fellowship (2003) from Rotary International and Ramchandra Purushottam Ganorkar Smruti Samajik Puraskar (2005).

Maharashtra Amateur Athletics Federation awarded the Krida Jivanvrati Samman to Vaidya in 2006. This was followed by a number of awards such as Vidarbha Gaurav award from Krishi Vikas Pratishthan, Nagpur, Shri Sant Gadge Baba Social Work Award (2010) from Shri Sant Gadge Baba Amravati University, Bharat Scouts and Guides Lifetime Achievement Award (2010), Vidarbha Bhushan Puraskar (2010) from Vidarbha Samaj Sangha, Mumbai, Krida Maharshi (2012) from Shankaracharya Vasudevanand Saraswati and Jivan Gaurav Award from the D. Y. Patil University. The Government of India awarded the civilian honour of Padma Shri to Vaidya in 2012.

== See also ==
- Physical Education
