= Sunny Thomas =

Indian shooter and shooting coach (1941–2025)

Personal information
- National team: India
- Citizenship: Indian
- Born: 26 September 1941
- Died: 30 April 2025 (aged 83)
- Occupations: Rifle shooter, Professor

Sport
- Country: India
- Sport: Rifle shooting

Sunny Thomas (26 September 1941 – 30 April 2025) was an Indian national shooting champion in the rifle open sight event from Kerala, India. He was the coach of the Indian shooting team for 19 years from 1993 to 2012. India won 108 gold, 74 silver and 53 bronze medals from various tournaments including the World Championships, Olympics and the Asian Games during his stint. He received the Dronacharya Award in 2001.

== Early life and education ==
Thomas was from Uzhavoor, Kottayam district, Kerala. He was born to KK Thomas and Marykutty of the Meckatt family in Thidanad, Kottayam. He did his post graduate studies in english at CMS College, Kottayam. He started as an english teacher at Sacred Heart College. Later, he was a professor of English language and also served as head of the department at St. Stephen's College, Uzhavoor. He taught english for nearly 30 years. He married KJ Josamma Sunny, professor of Botany also at St Stephen's. He had two sons, Manoj and Sanil, and a daughter, Sonia. He became a full-time shooting coach after his retirement in 1993 following an invitation from the federation, the National Rifle Association of India.

== Career ==
Thomas joined the Kottayam Rifle Club in 1965. Soon he started competing in the Kerala state championships and became the Kerala state champion five times. In 1976, he won his maiden National title in the Rifle 3 position open sight event. After taking part in the sport till mid 80s, he became a technical official and officiated at the 1982 New Delhi Asian Games.

== Career as coach ==
After taking over as the Chief coach for the Indian shooting teams, he coached Jaspal Rana for the 1994 Junior World Championship and he won a gold medal. It was the first time that India won a gold medal in Junior Worlds. Bindra went on to win India's first Olympic gold medal in an individual event at Beijing in 2008, also under his coaching. Earlier, Rajyavardhan Singh Rathore won double trap silver at the 2004 Athens Games, the first medal at Olympics for India. He also coached Gagan Narang who won a gold medal at the Afro Asian Games at Hyderabad in 2003. Under his guidance, Vijay Kumar won a silver at 2012 London Olympics. He was a god father for many other top shooters like Samaresh Jung and spent most of his time at the ranges in Bangalore and New Delhi to conduct multiple Indian shooting camps. From 1993, he worked as the coach for 19 years, till he resigned in 2012. He coached Indian teams for five Olympics, six World Championships, over 50 World Cups, six Asian Games and five Commonwealth Games.

== Legacy ==
On Thomas's 80th birthday, Abhinav Bindra expressed gratitude by saying, "I want to thank you for the guidance and support you provided me throughout my sporting career. As a patient and understanding mentor, you kept us going, through the tough times. Thank you for being a pillar of strength and nurturing me to unfurl my fullest potential." He was the 'lighthouse of Indian shooting', was how London Olympics bronze medallist Gagan Narang described him. “He held the sport together in its initial days when it was growing… a lot of shooters, including me, owe their success to him,” Narang told the Indian Express.

After his retirement as Indian coach, he established a shooting range at the Idukki Rifle Association in Kottayam.

== Death ==
Thomas suffered a heart attack and died on 30 April 2025, at the age of 83, in his home town in Uzhavoor. He was survived by his wife, two sons and a daughter. The funeral service was held at Thevakkal, near Kakkanad, in Kochi on 1 April. National Rifle Association of India president Kalikesh Narayan Singh Deo condoled his death.
