= O. M. Nambiar =

Indian athletics coach (1932–2021)

Othayothu Madhavan Nambiar
- Born: February 16, 1932; Vadakara, Kozhikode District, Kerala, British Raj
- Died: August 19, 2021 (aged 89); Vadakara, Kozhikode District, Kerala, India

Othayothu Madhavan Nambiar (16 February 1932 – 19 August 2021) was an Indian athletics coach who was awarded Dronacharya award in 1985 and Padma Shri in 2021. He coached the well known Indian athlete P. T. Usha.

== P. T. Usha ==
"For one who used to dream of wearing the India blazer as a sportsman in his Air Force days, O. M. Nambiar ended up becoming one of India's top coaches, a `Dronacharya' who was recognised for giving P. T. Usha to Indian athletics." "Usha was a natural athlete. Coach O. M. Nambiar moulded her into one of the all-time greats of Asian athletics."

About Usha's record-breaking win in the 200 meters at the Lucknow Senior Nationals, Nambiar said "It was laudable as her effort came a decade after she set the earlier mark at the Asian Track and Field Meet under my guidance."

== St. Stephens ==
As of 2005, Nambiar was serving as the senior coach of St. Stephen's International School in Hyderabad, Telangana. He had two trainees there, Sekhar Bhattacharya and Sabik Ali, of whom he was confident that at least one of them will become outstanding.

== Views on drugs ==
Nambiar was very concerned about and highly opposed to the use of performance enhancing drugs. He indicated that athletic contests in India were rife with abuse, because the testing and standards were so slack. He contended that was the reason that Indian athletes had such poor showings internationally, where things were much stricter.
