= List of career achievements by Sachin Tendulkar =

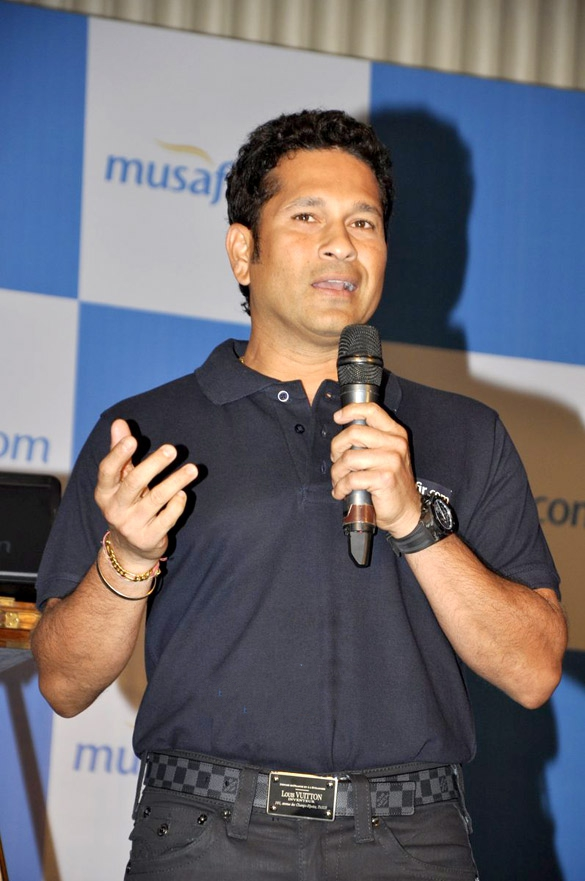
Sachin Tendulkar

This page presents some of the notable achievements of Sachin Tendulkar, a former Indian cricketer, universally regarded as one of the best batsmen of all time. Debates on Tendulkar's precise rank amongst his predecessors are unlikely to conclude soon. He was the sport's first batsman to score a double century (200 runs not out) in a single One Day International match, and is so far the only player to have scored 100 centuries in internationals. He played first-class cricket for 26 years and one day, whilst his international career spanned exactly 24 years from 15 November 1989 to 16 November 2013.

== Honours ==
=== Career and annual awards ===
- 1994: Arjuna Award recipient for achievements in cricket
- 1997: Tendulkar was one of the five cricketers selected as Wisden Cricketer of the Year.
- 1997/98: India's highest sporting honour – Rajiv Gandhi Khel Ratna
- 1999: Padma Shri – India's fourth highest civilian award
- 2001: Maharashtra Bhushan – Maharashtra's highest civilian award
- 2008: Padma Vibhushan – India's second-highest civilian award
- 2010: ICC Cricketer of the year – Highest award in the ICC listings
- 2010: LG People's Choice Award
- ICC World Test XI: 2009, 2010, 2011
- ICC World ODI XI: 2004, 2007, 2010
- Wisden Leading Cricketer in the World 1998, 2010
- 2014: Bharat Ratna – India's highest civilian award
- Most Effective Swachhata Ambassador award at Safaigiri – 2019
- 2019: Inducted into the ICC Cricket Hall of Fame
- 2020: Laureus World Sports Awards – Sporting Moment of the Year (2000–2020)

== Awards from the media ==
- In August 2003, he was voted as the "Greatest Sportsman" of the country in the sport personalities category in the Best of India poll conducted by Zee News.
- In November 2006, Time magazine named him as one of the Asian Heroes.
- In December 2006, he was named "Sports Person of the Year"
- In June 2009, Time magazine included his test debut in "Top 10 Sporting Moments".
- In 2010, he was voted as one of the world's 100 most influential people in "The 2010 Time 100" poll conducted by Time magazine.
- The India Poised campaign run by The Times of India nominated him as the "Face of New India" next to the likes of Amartya Sen and Mahatma Gandhi.
- In February 2010, he was declared "Sports Icon of the Year for 21 years" at the NDTV Indian of the Year Awards.

=== Awards for individual matches and series ===
Tendulkar has won a record 15 Man of the Series (MoS) and 62 Man of the Match (MoM) awards in ODI Matches. He has won a Man of the Match Award against every one of the ICC Full Members (Test Playing Nations). The only teams against whom he has not won an ODI Man of the Match award, are the United Arab Emirates (2 matches played), the Netherlands (1 match) and Bermuda (1 match).

== Man of the Match ==
S No	Opponent	Venue	Season	Match performance
1	England	Old Trafford, Manchester	1990	1st Innings: 68 (8×4); 2 catches 2nd Innings: 119 (17×4)
2	England	Chepauk, IN Chennai	1992/93	1st Innings: 165 (24×4, 1×6); 2–1–5–0; 2nd Innings: 2 catches; 2–1–4–0
3	New Zealand	Chepauk, Chennai	1995/96	1st Innings: 52 (5×4)
4	Australia	Chepauk, Chennai	1997/98	1st Innings: 4 (1×4); 1 catch 2nd Innings: 155 (14×4, 4×6)
5	Pakistan	Chepauk, Chennai	1998/99	1st Innings: 0; 3–0–10–1; 2nd Innings: 136 (18×4); 7–1–35–2
6	New Zealand	Motera, Ahmedabad	1999/00	1st Innings: 217 (29×4); 2nd Innings: 15 (3×4); 5–2–19–0
7	Australia	MCG, Melbourne	1999/00	1st Innings: 116 (9×4, 1×6); 2nd Innings: 52 (4×4)
8	South Africa	Wankhede, Mumbai	1999/00	1st Innings: 97 (12×4, 2×6); 5–1–10–3; 2nd Innings: 8 (2×4); 1–0–4–0
9	West Indies	Eden Gardens, Kolkata	2002/03	1st Innings: 36 (7×4); 7–0–33–0; 2nd Innings: 176 (26×4)
10	Australia	SCG, Sydney	2003/04	1st Innings: 241 (33×4); 2nd Innings: 60 (5×4); 6–0–36–0; 1 catch
11	Australia	Adelaide	2007/08	1st Innings: 153; 2nd Innings: 13
12	New Zealand	Hamilton	2009	1st Innings: 160; 2nd Innings: DNB

== Man of the Series awards ==
S.no	Season	Series	Performance
1	Border–Gavaskar Trophy (Australia in India Test Series)	1997/98	446 runs ( 5 Innings, 2×100, 1×50); 13.2–1–48–1; 2 catches
2	Border–Gavaskar Trophy (India in Australia Test Series)	1999/00	278 runs (6 Innings, 1×100, 2×50); 9–0–46–1
3	England in India Test Series	2001/02	307 runs (4 Innings, 1×100, 2×50); 17–3–50–1; 4 catches
4	India in Bangladesh Test Series	2007	254 runs (3 Innings, 2×100 ); 13.3–1–57–3; 4 catches
5	Border–Gavaskar Trophy (Australia in India Test Series)	2010	403 runs (4 Innings, 1×100, 2×50)

=== Total Man of the Match awards by opposition ===
#	Opponent	Total Man of match	Total games home	Total games away	Total games neutral
1	Australia (154 matches)	21	60	18	55
2	Bangladesh (30 matches)	18	09	10	11
3	England (170 matches)	29	85	16	40
4	New Zealand (12 matches)	6	4	2	0
5	Pakistan (66 matches)	18	22	55	15
6	South Africa (57 matches)	5	4	1	0
7	Sri Lanka (84 matches)	6	1	2	3
8	West Indies (39 matches)	9	3	1	5
9	Zimbabwe (34 matches)	8	0	4	4
10	Kenya (10 matches)	4	2	0	2
11	Namibia (1 match)	1	0	0	1
Total (463 ODI matches)		125	23	13	

== See also ==
- List of international cricket centuries by Sachin Tendulkar
- List of cricketers by number of international centuries scored
- Player of the Match awards (cricket)
- List of One Day International cricket records
- List of Test cricket records
