= K. P. Thomas (coach) =

Indian athletics coach

- Born: 6 May 1943 (age 82); Vazhithala, Idukki District, Kerala, British Raj
- Occupation: athletics coach
- Awards: Dronacharya Award

K. P. Thomas also known as Thomas Mash is an athletics coach from Kerala, India. In 2013, he received Dronacharya Award, India's highest award for sports coaching. He is the first-ever Physical Education instructor to win the Dronacharya.

Thomas's autobiography, Empowerment of Nation Through Sports, was launched in May 2018, in an event celebrating his 75th birthday.

== Biography ==
Kurishingal Philip Thomas was born on 1943, in Vazhithala in Idukki district. After passing three levels of the Army Physical Training Corps' (APTC) training courses in 1970's, in 1979, Thomas done the Master of Physical Education degree from the Lakshmibai National Institute of Physical Education, Gwalior.

Thomas's eldest daughter Raji, second daughter Rajni and son Rajas are all sportspersons.

== Sports career ==
Thomas represented the Indian army in 100m, 200 and 400m in several national level sports meets and also set a meet record in the Services meet in 1967. In 1972, Thomas represented India in the 400m relay at the Asian Games.

== Coaching career ==
Thomas was an Indian Army coach from 1963 to 1979. After leaving Army, from 1979 to 2005, he became a sports teacher at Koruthot C Keshavan Memorial High School in Koruthodu, Kottayam district. CKM School became champions at Kerala State School Athletics Championships for 17 consecutive years due to the efforts of Thomas Mash. Thomas officially retired from the job on 31 March 2000 but remained the unofficial coach of the Koruthodu school until 2005. After retiring from Koruthodu School, Thomas Mash, joined as coach at Entayar School for a while, and is now coaching the children along with his son Rajas, a coach at Thodupuzha Vannappuram SNMV Higher secondary school.

World Malayalee Council Thomas Mash Sports Academy started in 2015 at Vannappuram in Idukki district with the help of World Malayalee Council.

Many prominent sportspersons who have participated in international competitions for India including Shiny Wilson, Anju Bobby George, Jincy Phillip, Molly Chacko, C. S. Muralidharan, Joseph G. Abraham are Thomas Mash's disciples. It was he who turned Anju Bobby George, who had come to train in long-distance running, to jump events.

== Awards and recognition ==
In 2013, he received Dronacharya Award, India's highest award for sports coaching. He is the first-ever physical education teacher-cum-coach to win the Dronacharya.

Thomas's autobiography, Empowerment of Nation Through Sports, was launched in an event titled Guruvandanam, celebrating his 75th birthday, in May 2018.
