= R. D. Singh =

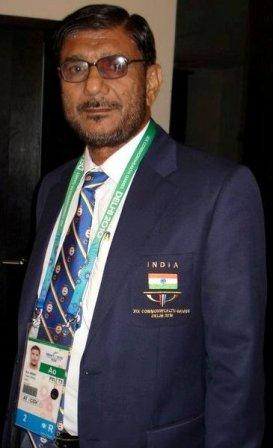
- R. D. Singh

Govt. N.M. College Hanumangarh
- In office 30 June 1980 – 30 June 2014

Personal details
- Born: 7 June 1954 (age 71); Karadwala, Rajasthan, India
- Occupation: Director Physical Education

Ripudaman Singh (born 7 June 1954), known as R.D. Singh, is an Indian athletics coach from Hanumangarh, Rajasthan. He is a recipient of Dronacharya Award, by the government of India. He is India's first Dronacharya awardee coach in the category of sports for specially abled.

== Career as an Athlete ==
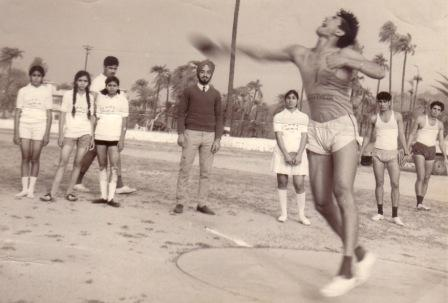
R. D. Singh

- In early days he won school national gold in shot put, discus throw and basketball. In college days, He became an Outstanding National Athlete because of his great achievements in sports like athletics, handball, volleyball, weightlifting, basketball at Uni. level and National level.
- He won gold medals in athletics events like Shot put, Discus throw, Javelin Throw in Punjabi University, Patiala and University of Rajasthan.
- In weightlifting he won silver medal in All India Inter Uni. Weightlifting Championship.
- In Handball he won gold medal for Punjabi University with best player of tournament.
- In Volleyball he won gold medal for Punjabi University and play for rest of India team.
- He played for Rajasthan Basketball Team with basketball players like Hanuman Singh and Ajmer Singh and he won 3 national gold and 1 silver medal for Rajasthan.
- He was trained by coaches lBhura Singh, Kenneth Owen Bosen and Sagar Sir.

== Career as a Coach ==
- After a good career as an athlete he joined N.M.P.G. College, Hanumangarh as a Director Physical Education in 1981. In early days of service he got governor award for excellent coaching to Rajasthan's athletes in 1985.
- Under his guidance approximately 500 trainees played in all India Inter University. He is working for physical handicap and BPL athletes from 1990.
- In 1997, He found Devendra Jhajharia in a school competition. In 2004 his trainee Devendra Jhajharia became paralympic gold medal winner of India.
- In 2005 Govt. of Rajasthan honored him for his achievements.
- In 2007 Govt. of India gave prestigious Dronacharya award for his great achievements in para-sport. He also became the first and only Dronacharya awardee for para-sports.
- In 2010 Hero Honda honored him for his achievements. In 2010 Asian Para Games his trainee Jagseer Singh won a historical gold medal. It was the only gold medal for India.
- He has worked as Chief Coach of para-athletics team in Commonwealth Games 2010, Delhi and 2010 Asian Para Games, Guangzhou.
- Many of his disciples have won national and international medals including the prestigious Arjun Award. Notables include:
- Devendra Jhajharia (Arjun Award Winner) - Only Indian Athlete who has three paralympics gold medals.
- Jagseer Singh (Arjun Award Winner) - Gold medalist in Asian Para Games for India.
- Sandeep Singh Maan (Arjun Award Winner) - Youngest athlete who won a silver medal in Asian Para Games.
- Deepa Malik (Arjun Award Winner) - Only athlete who won a silver medal in IPC Athletics World Championships. He was trained by R. D. Singh in his early years.
- Jagdeep Singh - He is nephew of Dronacharya R.D. Singh and now he is playing in the Indian basketball team. He was trained by R. D. Singh in his early years.
