= Robert Bobby George =

Indian athletics coach

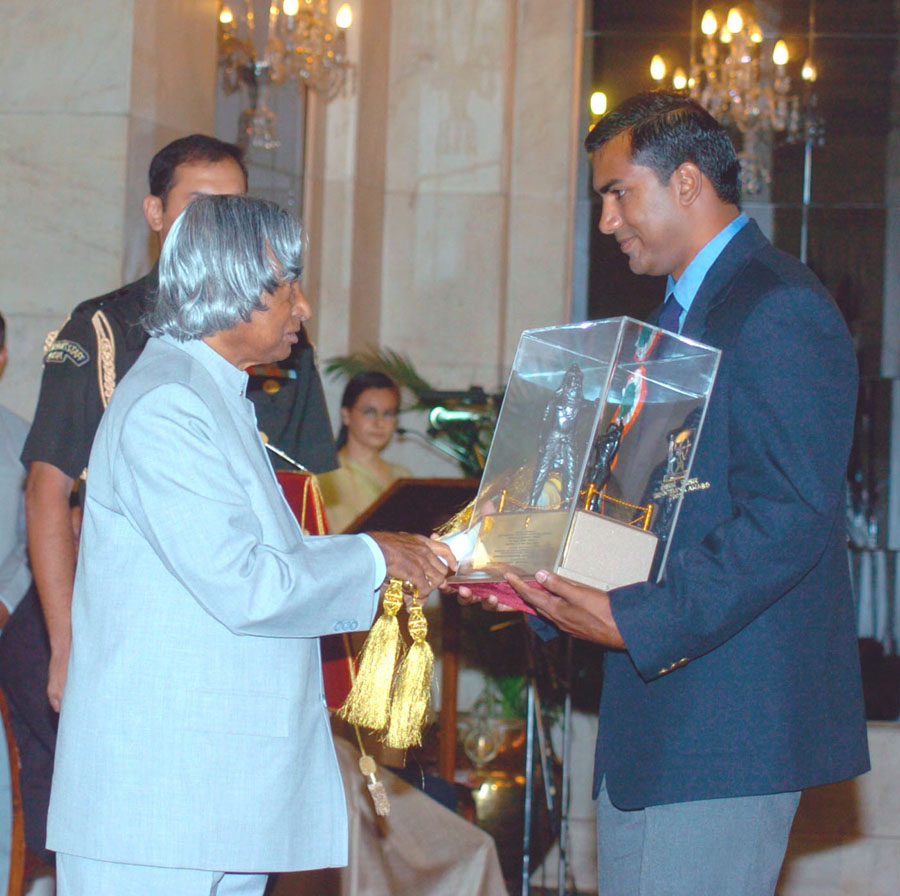
- former Indian president A. P. J. Abdul Kalam presenting the Dronacharya Award to Robert Bobby George in New Delhi on 21 September 2004
- Born: Kannur district, Kerala
- Occupation: Athletics coach
- Spouse: Anju Bobby George
- Children: 2
- Relatives: Jimmy George (brother)
- Awards: Dronacharya Award

Robert Bobby George is an athletics coach from Kerala, India. In 2004, he received Dronacharya Award, India's highest award for sports coaching.

== Biography ==
Robert Bobby George was born in Kannur district of Kerala, one of the ten children of Kodakachira George Joseph and Mary Joseph. He completed his engineering degree from College of Engineering, Trivandrum, 1991 batch.

Bobby married Anju in 2000. Couple have two children Aaron and Andriya.

== Career ==
Bobby George was a former national champion in triple jump. He is best known as the coach of his wife and long jump medalist Anju Bobby George. A mechanical engineer, Bobby quit his job in 1998 to become Anju's full-time coach.

In 2018, Bobby was appointed as 'high performance specialist coach' for India.

Anju and Bobby started their athletics training academy named Anju Bobby George Academy in Bangalore, Karnataka under Anju Bobby Sports Foundation.

== Awards ==
In 2003, he received the Dronacharya Award.
