= Tarak Sinha =

Indian cricket coach (1950–2021)

- Born: 31 December 1950
- Died: 6 November 2021 (aged 70); New Delhi
- Other name: Ustaadji
- Occupation: Cricket coach

Tarak Sinha ( 31 December 1950 – 6 November 2021) was an Indian cricket coach who ran the Sonnet Cricket Club in Delhi. In a coaching career that spanned over fifty years, he coached over 12 cricketers who went on to play international cricket for India and more than 100 first-class cricketers. Some of his famous students included Ashish Nehra, Aakash Chopra, Rishabh Pant, Shikhar Dhawan and Anjum Chopra. He also briefly served as the coach of the India women's national cricket team between 2001 and 2002.

He was affectionately called Ustaadji (teacher) by his charges. He was a recipient of India's Dronacharya Award in 2018 for his lifetime contributions to the sport.

== Career ==
=== Sonnet Cricket Club ===
Sinha founded the Sonnet Cricket Club in 1969 after he failed to get selected in Delhi's junior team for the C. K. Nayudu Trophy. That team incidentally was led by Salman Khurshid, who would later go onto become a political leader with the Indian National Congress. Sinha started the Sonnet cricket club along with two other cricket enthusiasts, Parmod Jain and Sharvan Kumar, at the Birla School grounds in Kamla Nagar, where he studied and played cricket as a wicket-keeper. He worked as a clerk at the PGDAV College at the same time. With an initial batch of 20-odd trainees and minimum facilities, the club did not get affiliation with the Delhi & District Cricket Association (DDCA). The club was shifted to Ajmal Khan Park in Karol Bagh in order to allow cricketers from other parts of the city to be trained. Followed by victories over more prominent clubs and participation in major tournaments, the club got DDCA affiliation in 1971 and was eventually promoted from D division to A division. The club then shifted to Rajdhani College where it got better facilities.

The club went on to win all major trophies over the years. It also formed a rivalry with the National Institute of Sport (NIS) which was run by the government and had much better facilities. According to Atul Wassan, "NIS catered to rich kids mainly and Sonnet encouraged boys from middle and lower middle class." In early 2000s, the club moved to Sri Venkateswara College in Delhi University's South Campus, which remains its base as recently as 2020. Several cricketers who got trained at the club in the past helped Sinha run the club. Sinha was known to travel to small towns in the northern part of the country in search of talent. He also was firm in his emphasis on academics for his students, an important 'Plan B' in case careers in the sport did not pan out. He was also known to extend monetary support paying school fees and providing free equipment to students who could not afford them.

In an interview with ESPNcricinfo, Sinha said that the club's name was inspired from Shakespeare's sonnets, and a desire to find a unique name. For all of his coaching services, he was referred to as Ustaadji (transl. maestro) by his students.

==== Notable alumni ====
International cricketers who trained under Sinha at the club:

- Surinder Khanna
- Randhir Singh
- Manoj Prabhakar
- Raman Lamba
- Ajay Sharma
- Sanjeev Sharma
- Atul Wassan
- Anjum Chopra
- Ashish Nehra
- Aakash Chopra
- Shikhar Dhawan
- Rishabh Pant
- Ishan Kishan

=== National and international assignments ===
The Board of Control for Cricket in India appointed Sinha the coach of Delhi; under him, the team won its fourth Ranji title in the 1985–86 season. In 2001–02, he was appointed head coach of the national women's team, when Mithali Raj and Jhulan Goswami were in their debut international seasons. The team went on to win its first overseas Test series, in South Africa, and beat England 4–0 at home during his tenure. In 2002, he was appointed to coach Delhi junior teams; the state won tournaments in under-15, under-19 and under-22 age groups.

The Rajasthan Cricket Association (RCA) sought Sinha's services as the director of its academies in 2010. He was part of Rajasthan's journey from the Plate Division to its first-ever Ranji trophy title in the 2010–11 season. After his ouster from the RCA, he was appointed the coach of another Plate Division team, Jharkhand, whom he guided to the Ranji knockouts for the first time in the 2012–13 season.

Sinha received the Dronacharya Award for lifetime achievement from the Government of India in 2018.

== Personal life ==
Sinha's wife was killed in an accident within a few months of his marriage. He never remarried. In his personal life, Sinha was known to have had limited means. At one point, when he was served an eviction note from his landlord, cricketer Ashish Nehra stepped in and bought him an apartment in New Delhi.

Sinha died on 6 November 2021, from lung cancer.

== Awards ==
- Dronacharya Award, 2018
- ESPNcricinfo's Contribution to Cricket award, 2013
