= Om Prakash Bhardwaj =

Indian boxer (1942–2021)

Personal information
- Born: 18 March 1942
- Died: 21 May 2021 (aged 79)

Boxing career

Om Prakash Bhardwaj (18 March 1942 – 21 May 2021) was an Indian boxing coach. In 1985, he was awarded the Dronacharya Award, India's highest award in the field of coaching of sports and athletics. He is India's first Dronacharya awardee coach for boxing.

Bhardwaj was national coach from 1968 to 1989. During this time, Indian boxers had been on top of the medals tally in the Asian Games (1970–1986), Mini Commonwealth Games (Brisbane, 1982), Kings Cup (Bangkok, 1982) and SAF Games (Calcutta, 1987).

He was the founder of the Boxing Coaching Department at the National Institute of Sports, Patiala, where he was chief coach from 1975 to 1988. He trained around 15,000 boxers in India. Bhardwaj also taught some basic boxing techniques to Rahul Gandhi.
