= List of international cricket centuries by Sachin Tendulkar =

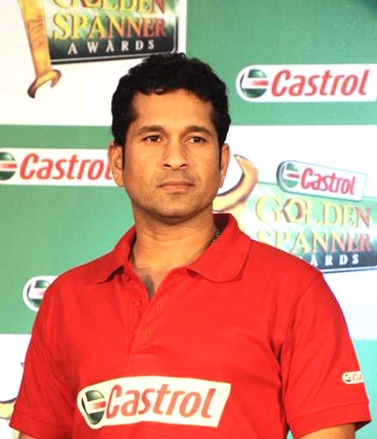
Sachin Tendulkar has scored more centuries in Test cricket than any other player.

Sachin Tendulkar played for India, widely acknowledged as one of the greatest batsmen of all time, he is the most prolific run-scorer in international cricket. Tendulkar has scored the highest number of centuries (100 or more runs) in Test matches and One Day International (ODI) matches organised by the International Cricket Council. His total of 51 centuries in Test matches is a world record for highest number of centuries by a batsman and his 49 centuries in ODI matches are the second highest number of centuries after Virat Kohli. He became the first and only cricketer to score 100 international centuries when he made 114 against Bangladesh in March 2012.

After making his Test debut in 1989, Tendulkar achieved his first century against England at Old Trafford, Manchester in 1990; he made 119 not out. In Test matches, Tendulkar has scored centuries against all the Test cricket playing nations, and is the second batsman to score 150 against each of them. (Note: The first being Steve Waugh) He has scored a century in at least one cricket ground of all Test cricket playing nations, except Zimbabwe. In October 2010, Tendulkar went past Brian Lara's record of 19 scores of 150 or more by hitting his 20th against Australia in Bangalore. He made his highest score in 2004, when he made 248 not out against Bangladesh at the Bangabandhu National Stadium, Dhaka. Tendulkar has scored six double centuries and remained unbeaten on 15 occasions. His centuries have come in 30 different cricket grounds, with 27 of them being scored in venues outside India. Tendulkar has been dismissed nine times between scores of 90 and 99.

Although Tendulkar made his ODI debut in 1989 it took him five years to make his first century in the format. He made 110 against Australia in the third match of the Singer World Series at the R. Premadasa Stadium, Colombo in September 1994. In ODIs, Tendulkar has scored centuries against 11 different opponents. He has scored centuries against all cricketing nations that have permanent One Day International status. He was the first batsman to score a double century in ODIs, which he scored against South Africa at the Captain Roop Singh Stadium, Gwalior in 2010. (Note: The score has been surpassed by Virender Sehwag (219), Rohit Sharma (208 not out, 209 and 264), Chris Gayle (215), Martin Guptill (237 not out), Fakhar Zaman, Pathum Nissanka (both 210 not out), Ishan Kishan (210), Shubman Gill (208) and Glenn Maxwell (201 not out).) He has scored 19 ODI centuries in India, compared to 30 in away or neutral venues. Seven of these centuries were hit at the Sharjah Cricket Association Stadium. He has been dismissed 18 times between the score of 90 and 99 and 17 times between the score of 80 and 89.

== Key ==
- * – Remained not out
- ‡ – Captain of India in that match
- † – Man of the match

== List of Test cricket centuries ==
Test centuries scored by Sachin Tendulkar
No.	Score	Against	Pos.	Inn.	Test	Venue	H/A	Date	Result	Ref
1	119* †	England	6	4	2	Old Trafford, Manchester	Away	9 August 1990	Drawn	
2	148*	Australia	6	2	3	Sydney Cricket Ground, Sydney	Away	2 January 1992	Drawn	
3	114	Australia	4	2	5	WACA Ground, Perth	Away	1 February 1992	Lost	
4	111	South Africa	4	2	2	Wanderers Stadium, Johannesburg	Away	26 November 1992	Drawn	
5	165 †	England	4	1	2	M. A. Chidambaram Stadium, Chennai	Home	11 February 1993	Won	
6	104*	Sri Lanka	4	3	2	Sinhalese Sports Club Ground, Colombo	Away	27 July 1993	Won	
7	142	Sri Lanka	4	1	1	K. D. Singh Babu Stadium, Lucknow	Home	18 January 1994	Won	
8	179	West Indies	4	1	2	Vidarbha Cricket Association Ground, Nagpur	Home	1 December 1994	Drawn	
9	122	England	4	3	1	Edgbaston, Birmingham	Away	6 June 1996	Lost	
10	177	England	4	1	3	Trent Bridge, Nottingham	Away	4 July 1996	Drawn	
11	169 ‡	South Africa	5	2	2	Newlands Cricket Ground, Cape Town	Away	2 January 1997	Lost	
12	143 ‡	Sri Lanka	4	1	1	R. Premadasa Stadium, Colombo	Away	2 August 1997	Drawn	
13	139 ‡	Sri Lanka	4	2	2	Sinhalese Sports Club Ground, Colombo	Away	9 August 1997	Drawn	
14	148 ‡	Sri Lanka	5	1	3	Wankhede Stadium, Mumbai	Home	3 December 1997	Drawn	
15	155* †	Australia	4	3	1	M. A. Chidambaram Stadium, Chennai	Home	6 March 1998	Won	
16	177	Australia	4	1	3	M. Chinnaswamy Stadium, Bangalore	Home	25 March 1998	Lost	
17	113	New Zealand	5	3	2	Basin Reserve, Wellington	Away	26 December 1998	Lost	
18	136 †	Pakistan	4	4	1	M. A. Chidambaram Stadium, Chennai	Home	28 January 1999	Lost	
19	124*	Sri Lanka	4	3	2	Sinhalese Sports Club Ground, Colombo	Away	24 February 1999	Drawn	
20	126* ‡	New Zealand	4	3	1	Punjab Cricket Association Stadium, Mohali	Home	10 October 1999	Drawn	
21	217 ‡ †	New Zealand	4	1	3	Sardar Patel Stadium, Motera, Ahmedabad	Home	29 October 1999	Drawn	
22	116 ‡ †	Australia	4	2	2	Melbourne Cricket Ground, Melbourne	Away	26 December 1999	Lost	
23	122	Zimbabwe	4	2	1	Feroz Shah Kotla Ground, New Delhi	Home	18 November 2000	Won	
24	201*	Zimbabwe	4	1	2	Vidarbha Cricket Association Ground, Nagpur	Home	25 November 2000	Drawn	
25	126	Australia	4	2	3	M. A. Chidambaram Stadium, Chennai	Home	18 March 2001	Won	
26	155	South Africa	4	1	1	Goodyear Park, Bloemfontein	Away	3 November 2001	Lost	
27	103	England	4	2	2	Sardar Patel Stadium, Ahmedabad	Home	11 December 2001	Drawn	
28	176	Zimbabwe	4	2	1	Vidarbha Cricket Association Ground, Nagpur	Home	21 February 2002	Won	
29	117	West Indies	4	1	2	Queen's Park Oval, Port of Spain	Away	19 April 2002	Won	
30	193	England	4	1	3	Headingley, Leeds	Away	22 August 2002	Won	
31	176 †	West Indies	4	3	3	Eden Gardens, Kolkata	Home	30 October 2002	Drawn	
32	241* †	Australia	4	1	4	Sydney Cricket Ground, Sydney	Away	2 January 2004	Drawn	
33	194*	Pakistan	4	1	1	Multan Cricket Stadium, Multan	Away	28 March 2004	Won	
34	248*	Bangladesh	4	2	1	Bangabandhu National Stadium, Dhaka	Away	10 December 2004	Won	
35	109	Sri Lanka	4	1	2	Feroz Shah Kotla Ground, New Delhi	Home	10 December 2005	Won	
36	101	Bangladesh	4	1	1	Bir Shrestha Shahid Ruhul Amin Stadium, Chittagong	Away	18 May 2007	Drawn	
37	122*	Bangladesh	4	1	2	Sher-e-Bangla National Stadium, Mirpur	Away	25 May 2007	Won	
38	154*	Australia	4	2	2	Sydney Cricket Ground, Sydney	Away	2 January 2008	Lost	
39	153 †	Australia	4	1	4	Adelaide Oval, Adelaide	Away	24 January 2008	Drawn	
40	109	Australia	4	1	4	Vidarbha Cricket Association Stadium, Nagpur	Home	6 November 2008	Won	
41	103*	England	4	4	1	M. A. Chidambaram Stadium, Chennai	Home	11 December 2008	Won	
42	160 †	New Zealand	4	2	1	Seddon Park, Hamilton	Away	18 March 2009	Won	
43	100*	Sri Lanka	5	3	1	Sardar Patel Stadium, Ahmedabad	Home	16 November 2009	Drawn	
44	105* †	Bangladesh	4	1	1	Zohur Ahmed Chowdhury Stadium, Chittagong	Away	17 January 2010	Won	
45	143	Bangladesh	4	2	2	Sher-e-Bangla National Stadium, Mirpur	Away	24 January 2010	Won	
46	100	South Africa	4	3	1	Vidarbha Cricket Association Stadium, Nagpur	Home	6 February 2010	Lost	
47	106	South Africa	4	2	2	Eden Gardens, Kolkata	Home	14 February 2010	Won	
48	203	Sri Lanka	4	2	2	Sinhalese Sports Club Ground, Colombo	Away	26 July 2010	Drawn	
49	214 †	Australia	4	2	2	M. Chinnaswamy Stadium, Bangalore	Home	9 October 2010	Won	
50	111*	South Africa	5	3	1	SuperSport Park, Centurion	Away	16 December 2010	Lost	
51	146	South Africa	4	2	3	Newlands Cricket Ground, Cape Town	Away	2 January 2011	Drawn	

== List of ODI centuries ==
ODI centuries scored by Sachin Tendulkar
No.	Score	Against	Pos.	Inn.	S/R	Venue	H/A/N	Date	Result	Ref
1	110 †	Australia	2	1	84.61	R. Premadasa Stadium, Colombo	Neutral	9 September 1994	Won	
2	115 †	New Zealand	2	2	84.55	IPCL Sports Complex Ground, Vadodara	Home	28 October 1994	Won	
3	105	West Indies	2	1	78.35	Sawai Mansingh Stadium, Jaipur	Home	11 November 1994	Won	
4	112* †	Sri Lanka	2	2	104.67	Sharjah Cricket Association Stadium, Sharjah	Neutral	9 April 1995	Won	
5	127* †	Kenya	2	2	92.02	Barabati Stadium, Cuttack	Home	18 February 1996	Won	
6	137	Sri Lanka	2	1	100.00	Feroz Shah Kotla, New Delhi	Home	2 March 1996	Lost	
7	100	Pakistan	2	1	90.09	Padang, Singapore	Neutral	5 April 1996	Lost	
8	118 †	Pakistan	2	1	84.28	Sharjah Cricket Association Stadium, Sharjah	Neutral	15 April 1996	Won	
9	110 ‡	Sri Lanka	2	1	79.71	R. Premadasa Stadium, Colombo	Away	28 August 1996	Lost	
10	114 ‡ †	South Africa	1	1	90.47	Wankhede Stadium, Mumbai	Home	14 December 1996	Won	
11	104 ‡ †	Zimbabwe	1	1	107.21	Willowmoore Park, Benoni	Neutral	9 February 1997	Won	
12	117 ‡ †	New Zealand	2	2	85.40	M. Chinnaswamy Stadium, Bangalore	Home	14 May 1997	Won	
13	100 †	Australia	2	2	112.35	Green Park Stadium, Kanpur	Home	7 April 1998	Won	
14	143 †	Australia	2	2	109.16	Sharjah Cricket Association Stadium, Sharjah	Neutral	22 April 1998	Lost	
15	134 †	Australia	2	2	102.29	Sharjah Cricket Association Stadium, Sharjah	Neutral	24 April 1998	Won	
16	100* †	Kenya	2	2	97.08	Eden Gardens, Kolkata	Home	31 May 1998	Won	
17	128 †	Sri Lanka	2	1	97.70	R. Premadasa Stadium, Colombo	Away	7 July 1998	Won	
18	127* †	Zimbabwe	2	2	97.69	Queens Sports Club, Bulawayo	Away	26 September 1998	Won	
19	141 †	Australia	2	1	110.15	Bangabandhu Stadium, Dhaka	Neutral	28 October 1998	Won	
20	118* †	Zimbabwe	2	2	105.35	Sharjah Cricket Association Stadium, Sharjah	Neutral	8 November 1998	Won	
21	124* †	Zimbabwe	2	2	134.78	Sharjah Cricket Association Stadium, Sharjah	Neutral	13 November 1998	Won	
22	140* †	Kenya	4	1	138.61	County Ground, Bristol	Neutral	23 May 1999	Won	
23	120 ‡	Sri Lanka	1	1	85.10	Sinhalese Sports Club Ground, Colombo	Away	29 August 1999	Won	
24	186* ‡ †	New Zealand	2	1	124.00	Lal Bahadur Shastri Stadium, Hyderabad	Home	8 November 1999	Won	
25	122 †	South Africa	2	2	88.40	IPCL Sports Complex Ground, Vadodara	Home	17 March 2000	Won	
26	101 †	Sri Lanka	2	1	72.14	Sharjah Cricket Association Stadium, Sharjah	Neutral	20 October 2000	Lost	
27	146	Zimbabwe	2	1	95.42	Barkatullah Khan Stadium, Jodhpur	Home	8 December 2000	Lost	
28	139 †	Australia	2	1	111.20	Nehru Stadium, Indore	Home	31 March 2001	Won	
29	122* †	West Indies	2	2	93.12	Harare Sports Club, Harare	Neutral	4 July 2001	Won	
30	101	South Africa	2	1	78.29	New Wanderers Stadium, Johannesburg	Away	5 October 2001	Lost	
31	146 †	Kenya	2	1	110.60	Boland Park, Paarl	Neutral	24 October 2001	Won	
32	105*	England	4	1	97.22	Riverside Ground, Chester-le-Street	Away	4 July 2002	No result	
33	113 †	Sri Lanka	4	1	110.78	County Ground, Bristol	Neutral	11 July 2002	Won	
34	152 †	Namibia	2	1	100.66	City Oval, Pietermaritzburg	Neutral	23 February 2003	Won	
35	100 †	Australia	2	1	84.03	Roop Singh Stadium, Gwalior	Home	26 October 2003	Won	
36	102	New Zealand	2	1	112.08	Lal Bahadur Shastri Stadium, Hyderabad	Home	15 November 2003	Won	
37	141 †	Pakistan	2	2	104.44	Rawalpindi Cricket Stadium, Rawalpindi	Away	16 March 2004	Lost	
38	123	Pakistan	2	1	94.61	Sardar Patel Stadium, Motera, Ahmedabad	Home	12 April 2005	Lost	
39	100	Pakistan	2	1	88.49	Arbab Niaz Stadium, Peshawar	Away	6 February 2006	Lost	
40	141*	West Indies	2	1	95.27	Kinrara Academy Oval, Kuala Lumpur	Neutral	14 September 2006	Lost	
41	100*	West Indies	4	1	131.57	IPCL Sports Complex Ground, Vadodara	Home	31 January 2007	Won	
42	117* †	Australia	1	2	97.50	Sydney Cricket Ground, Sydney	Away	2 March 2008	Won	
43	163* †	New Zealand	2	1	122.55	AMI Stadium, Christchurch	Away	8 March 2009	Won	
44	138 †	Sri Lanka	1	1	103.75	R. Premadasa Stadium, Colombo	Away	14 September 2009	Won	
45	175 †	Australia	2	2	124.11	Rajiv Gandhi International Stadium, Hyderabad	Home	5 November 2009	Lost	
46	200* †	South Africa	2	1	136.05	Roop Singh Stadium, Gwalior	Home	24 February 2010	Won	
47	120	England	2	1	104.34	M. Chinnaswamy Stadium, Bangalore	Home	27 February 2011	Tied	
48	111	South Africa	2	1	109.90	VCA Stadium, Nagpur	Home	12 March 2011	Lost	
49	114	Bangladesh	2	1	77.55	Sher-e-Bangla National Stadium, Mirpur	Away	16 March 2012	Lost	

== Tendulkar's centuries and match results for India ==
	Total	Won	Win %	Lost	Lost%	Tie	Tie%	Draw	Draw%	NR	NR%
Test	51	20	39.22%	11	21.56%	0	0%	20	39.22%	0	0%
ODI	49	33	67.35%	14	28.57%	1	2.04%	0	0%	1	2.04%
Total	100	53	53%	25	25%	1	1%	20	20%	1	1%

== Team wise record ==
Centuries against different nations
Opponent	Test	ODI	Total
Australia	11	9	20
Bangladesh	5	1	6
England	7	2	9
Kenya	–	4	4
Namibia	–	1	1
New Zealand	4	5	9
Pakistan	2	5	7
South Africa	7	5	12
Sri Lanka	9	8	17
West Indies	3	4	7
Zimbabwe	3	5	8
Total	51	49	100

== See also ==
- List of career achievements by Sachin Tendulkar
- List of cricketers by number of international centuries scored
- Player of the Match awards (cricket)
- List of One Day International cricket records
- List of Test cricket records

== Notes and references ==
Notes
