= Mohammed Ali Qamar =

Indian boxer

Personal information
- Nationality: Indian

Boxing career
Medal record
Representing India
Commonwealth Games
Gold medal – first place	2002 Manchester	Light Flyweight

Mohammed Ali Qamar is a boxer from Kolkata, India. He was the first Indian to win a gold medal in the discipline of boxing in the Commonwealth Games at the 2002 Commonwealth Games held in Manchester. Born into the Ghettoes of Kidderpore in Kolkata, Qamar was inducted into boxing at an early age by his father at the Kidderpore School of Physical Education, and was coached by Cheena Bhai. Qamar became the Inter-district champion in the state of West Bengal in 1991. He won the Light Flyweight category at the national sub-junior levels from 1992 to 1996. Qamar had a strong showing in the 1999 World Amateur Boxing Championships in Houston, reaching the quarter finals before losing to Ron Siler of the United States. At the 2002 Commonwealth Games in Manchester, Qamar upset the home favorite Darren Langley 27–25 in the final, outscoring Langley 10-3 and surviving a standing count in the dramatic final round after trailing by 5 points at the beginning of the fourth and last round. Qamar's career was plagued by injury and he did not win a major competition again, losing in the quarterfinals at the 2002 Asian Games at Pusan. Qamar's neighborhood of Kidderpore is the hub of Women's boxing in India, who claim Qamar as one of their inspirations.

== Awards ==
- Gold medal in the Commonwealth Games at the 2002
- Arjuna Award, 2002
- Drona Award, 2022

== See also ==
- 2002 Commonwealth Games
