= L Ibomcha Singh =

Indian boxer

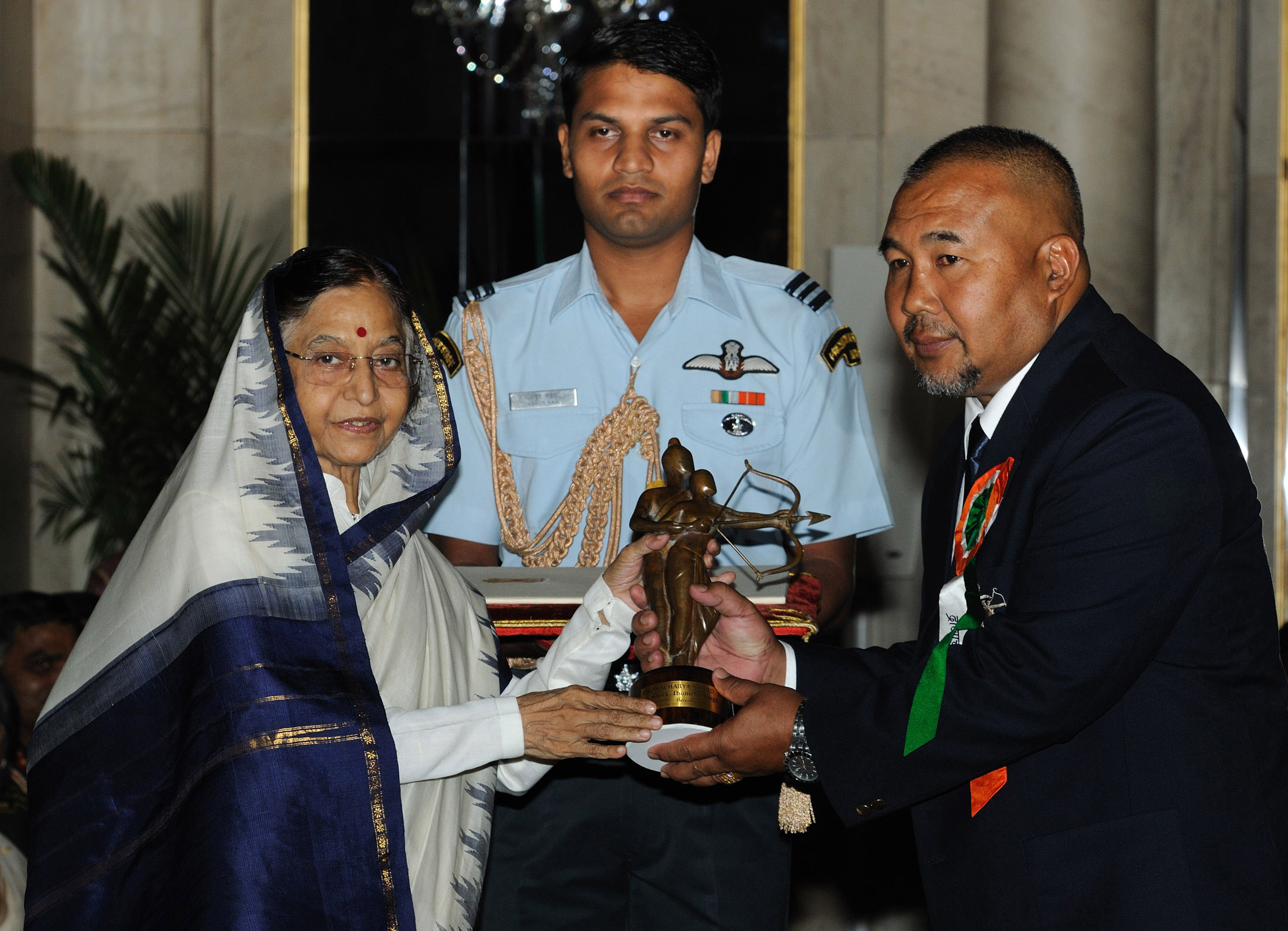
The President, Smt. Pratibha Devisingh Patil presenting the Dronacharya Award-2010 to Shri L. Ibomcha Singh for Boxing, in a glittering ceremony, at Rashtrapati Bhawan, in New Delhi on 29 August 2010

L Ibomcha Singh is a boxing coach from Manipur in India. In 2010, he was awarded the Dronacharya Award for his services to boxing by the Indian government.

== Career as an athlete ==
Ibomcha was the first boxer to win the state a National medal in boxing when he won the bronze in the 1981 National Games.

== Career as a coach ==
Ibomcha has produced 38 international medalists in boxing including two Arjuna awardees, two Olympians, two world champions and one world military games champion. His trainees included five times world women boxing champion Mangte Chungneijang Merykom, Laishram Sarita Devi N.G. Dingko Singh, P Narjit, S Suresh, and M Suranjoy.
