= Anjum Chopra =

Indian cricketer

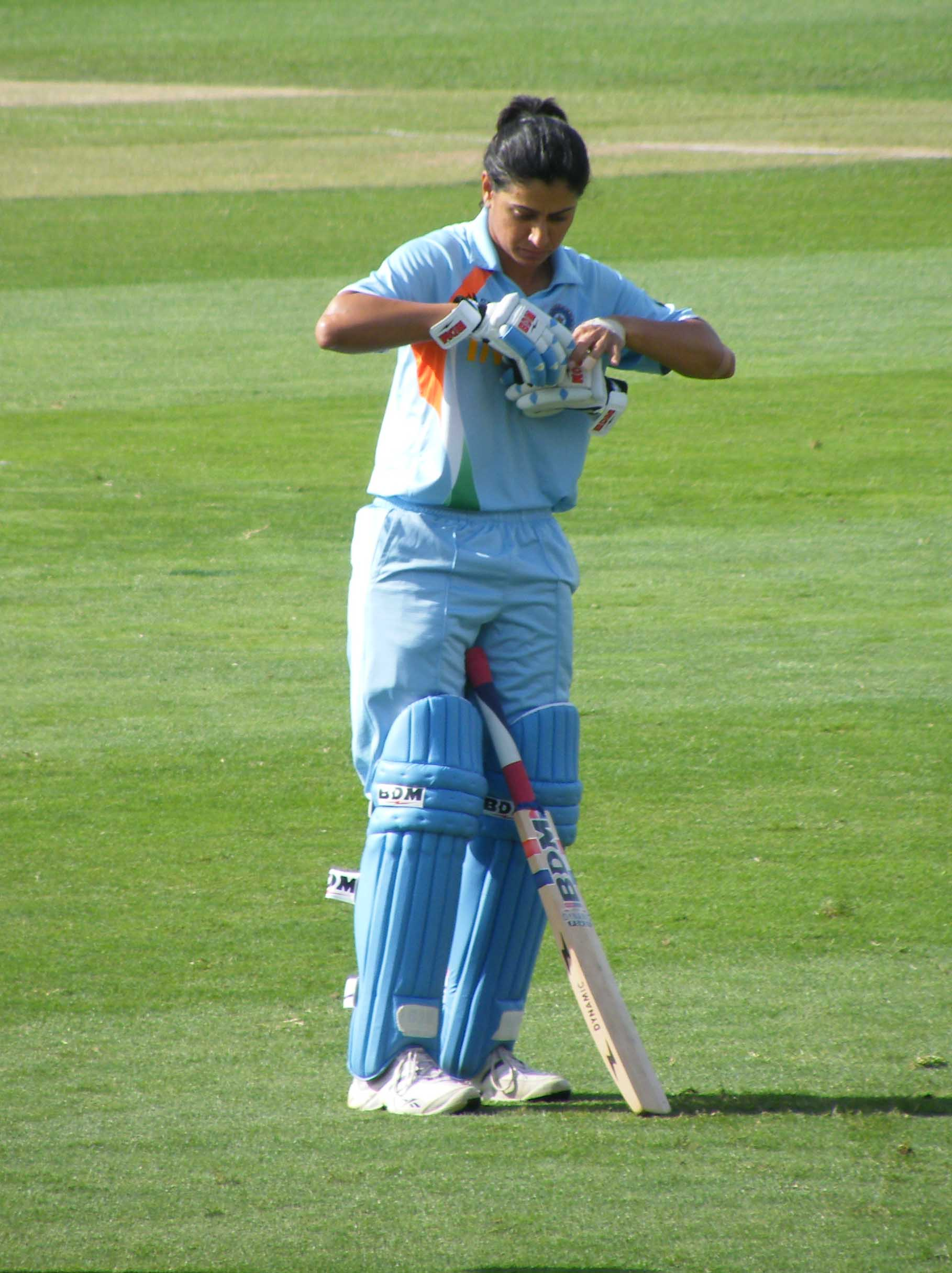
- Chopra in 2009

Personal information
- Full name: Anjum Chopra
- Born: 20 May 1977 (age 49); New Delhi, India
- Batting: Left-handed
- Bowling: Right-arm medium
- Role: Batter

International information
- National side: India (1995–2012)
- Test debut (cap 47): 17 November 1995 v England
- Last Test: 29 August 2006 v England
- ODI debut (cap 42): 12 February 1995 v New Zealand
- Last ODI: 16 March 2012 v Australia
- T20I debut (cap 2): 5 August 2006 v England
- Last T20I: 23 March 2012 v Australia

Domestic team information
- Years: Team
- 1992/93–1995/96: Delhi
- 1996/97–2004/05: Air India
- 2006/07–2011/12: Delhi

Career statistics
Competition	WTest	WODI	T20I	WLA
Matches	12	127	18	225
Runs scored	548	2,856	241	5,521
Batting average	30.44	31.38	17.21	35.85
100s/50s	0/4	1/18	0/0	1/34
Top score	98	100	37*	100
Balls bowled	258	601	–	661
Wickets	2	9	–	18
Bowling average	44.00	46.00	–	30.27
5 wickets in innings	0	0	–	0
10 wickets in match	0	0	–	0
Best bowling	1/9	2/9	–	3/11
Catches/stumpings	13/–	33/–	3/–	64/–
Medal record
Representing India
Women's cricket
World Cup
Runner-up	2005 South Africa

Anjum Chopra (born 20 May 1977) is an Indian cricket commentator and former cricketer. She represented India in over 150 international matches across formats over 18 years. Chopra was the first woman to reach 1,000 ODI runs for India. Since retirement, Chopra has worked as an English-language commentator covering professional cricket such as the Indian Premier League.

She played various sports at an early age, representing her school and college in athletics, basketball, and swimming. She was also a member of the Delhi State basketball team that competed at nationals.

Chopra made her debut in one-day internationals at the age of 17, on 12 February 1995 against New Zealand at Christchurch, New Zealand, and made her debut in Test cricket a few months later against England at Eden Gardens, Kolkata, on 17 November 1995. In only her second series for India the same year, she was awarded player of the series in the one-day internationals against the visiting England cricket team, scoring at an average of 67.5.

She played as a left-handed batter who bowled right-arm medium pace. She played in 12 Tests, 127 ODIs and 18 T20Is. She was coached by Sunita Sharma, Hardeep Dua and Tarak Sinha from Sonnet Club.

Chopra is recognized as the face of women's cricket in India as a player, captain, consultant, commentator, motivational speaker, author, and actor.

== Personal life ==
Chopra attended Delhi Public School R.K. Puram. She received her undergraduate degree from St. Stephen’s College, Delhi and completed her master's degree in Business Administration from FORE School of Management with a dual specialisation in Marketing and Human Resources.

Chopra belongs to a family of sportspeople:

- Maternal grandfather Ved Prakash Sahni was an athlete and represented India. He was also a cricket commentator.
- Mother Poonam Chopra has won a Goodyear car rally.
- Brother Nirvan Chopra has represented Delhi state in Under−17 and Under-19 cricket.
- Maternal uncle Rohit Sahni is a former cricketer who captained both Hindu College and Delhi University.

Chopra is also a pet lover who loves to spend time with her dogs at home.

== Career ==
Anjum Chopra is both a Test and One Day International cricketer who represented India's national women's cricket team. She is currently working as a cricket commentator. She made her One Day International debut in 1995 against New Zealand at Christchurch. In the first ODI she opened the bowling for India, giving 14 runs in her 4 overs. Going in to bat at No 10 for India, she had a crucial partnership of 11 runs to secure the victory for India.

She made her Test match debut in November 1995 against England in Calcutta. She was sent in as a nightwatchman against the English team in her very first Test match for India. Living up to her coach's confidence in her she successfully batted until the next morning until lunch scoring 27 runs for her team.

She was made Vice Captain of the Indian team in 2000 ESPNcricinfo World Cup in New Zealand. With two player of the match awards and the highest scorer from India, Chopra led the batting charts at the World Cup until the Indian team lost in the semi-finals to eventual winners New Zealand.

Chopra was made the Captain of the Indian team in 2002. In her first series as skipper, she led India with 7 debutants to a whitewash win over visiting England team, a record victory. The Indian team's first tour of South Africa saw them record their first overseas Test win, with Anjum Chopra scoring a match-winning 80. Her astute captaincy and using the part-time bowlers got the team 20 South African wickets at Paarl.

In 2005 World Cup in South Africa, India reached the finals of the World Cup for the first time. She was the top scorer from India and was also the Player of the Match against England.

In 2009 World Cup in Australia, in a must-win game for India, Chopra scored 76 match-winning runs and bagged the player of the match award. India finished third at the World Cup behind England and New Zealand.

She has played 6 World Cups for India, including four 50-over World Cups and two T20 World Cups. She is the first player to play 100 ODIs for India. One of the strong fielders on the team and a safe pair of hands, she has held the highest number of slip catches for India. A right arm medium pace bowler, Chopra made her debut as an all-rounder, opening the bowling in her first ODI and batting at No 10. She is the eighth-highest run-getter in women's ODIs.

Chopra has batted at almost all positions for her team, including opening, when needed. She has scored against some of the best of bowling attacks in the world, and is known to occupy the crease and bat for long hours. For example, batting in the 2000 World Cup in New Zealand against Ireland, India was reeling at 3 wickets down with 1 run on the board. She played a patient knock of 70 runs and won the match.

She is known to bat well under pressure and has played numerous knocks to perfection to get the victory. A quick runner between the wickets, her ability to convert ones to twos had been an outstanding feature of Chopra's batting style.

In the corporate world, Chopra is a motivational and corporate speaker/consultant. Also an MBA, she has conducted training programs for globally recognised brands such as General Electric, Standard Chartered, Goldman Sachs, Vodafone, and various schools and colleges.

== Domestic career ==
Anjum Chopra is a Delhi native who has played for the state since her Under-15 days. She has also represented Air India (her employers) for domestic matches where she emerged as the most successful skipper for the women's team.

Under her captaincy:

- Delhi state won the National championship in 2012 season, the first time in history that the Delhi women's team has won the national cricket championship.
- Air India won the nationals and zonal championships in both 2002 and 2003.
- Air India was declared as "Best team of the year" in 2003.

The 2011–12 cricket season saw her achieving victories for Delhi State. Captaining the team, Delhi won the national championship for the first time in history of the women's game. She also went on to lead the North Zone team that won the Zonal championships the same year. In the T20 format, Delhi state finished as runner-up, ending the year as the "Best State Team".

== Awards ==
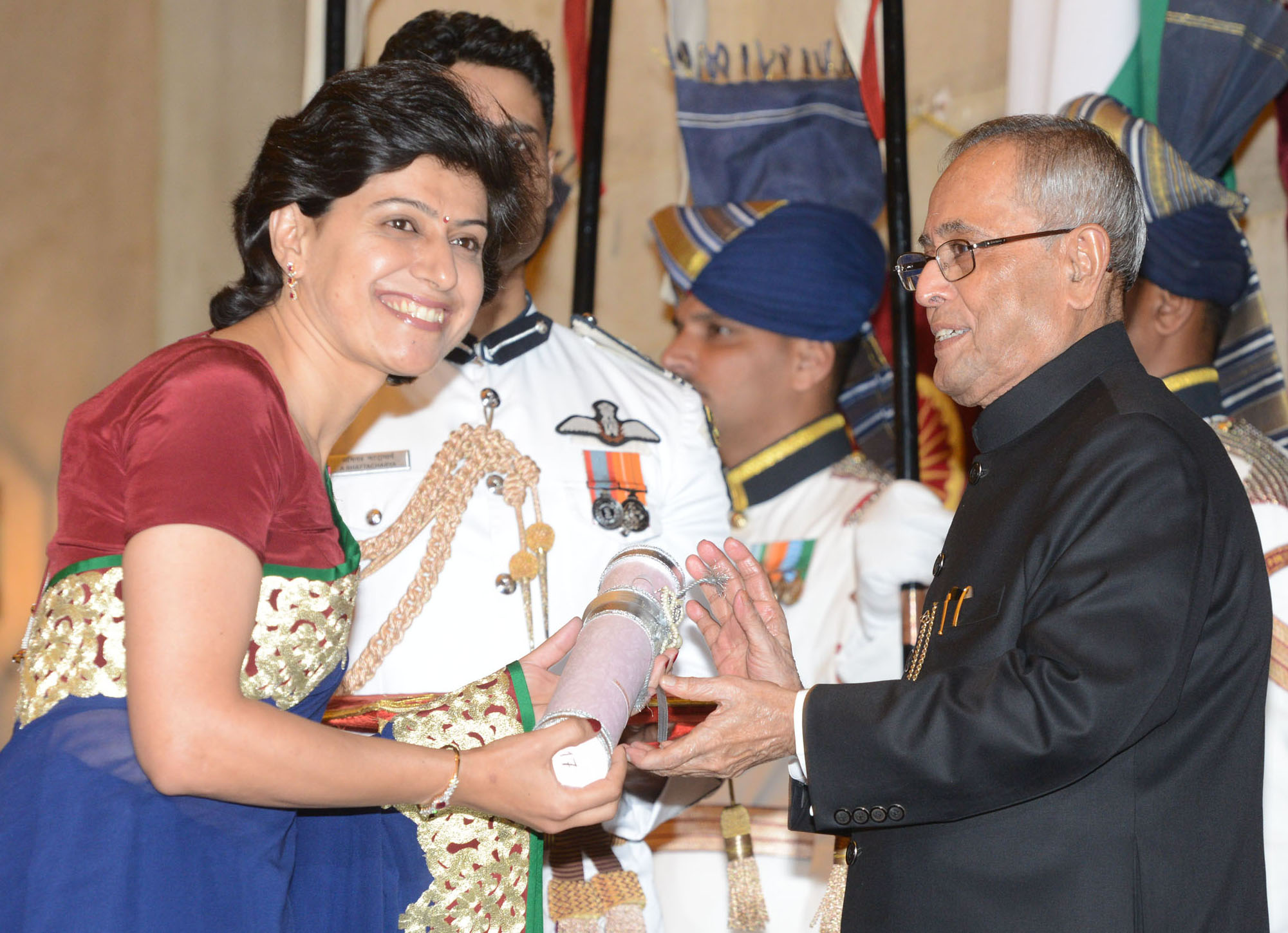
The President, Shri Pranab Mukherjee presenting the Padma Shri Award to Ms. Anjum Chopra, at an Investiture Ceremony-II, at Rashtrapati Bhavan, in New Delhi on April 26, 2014

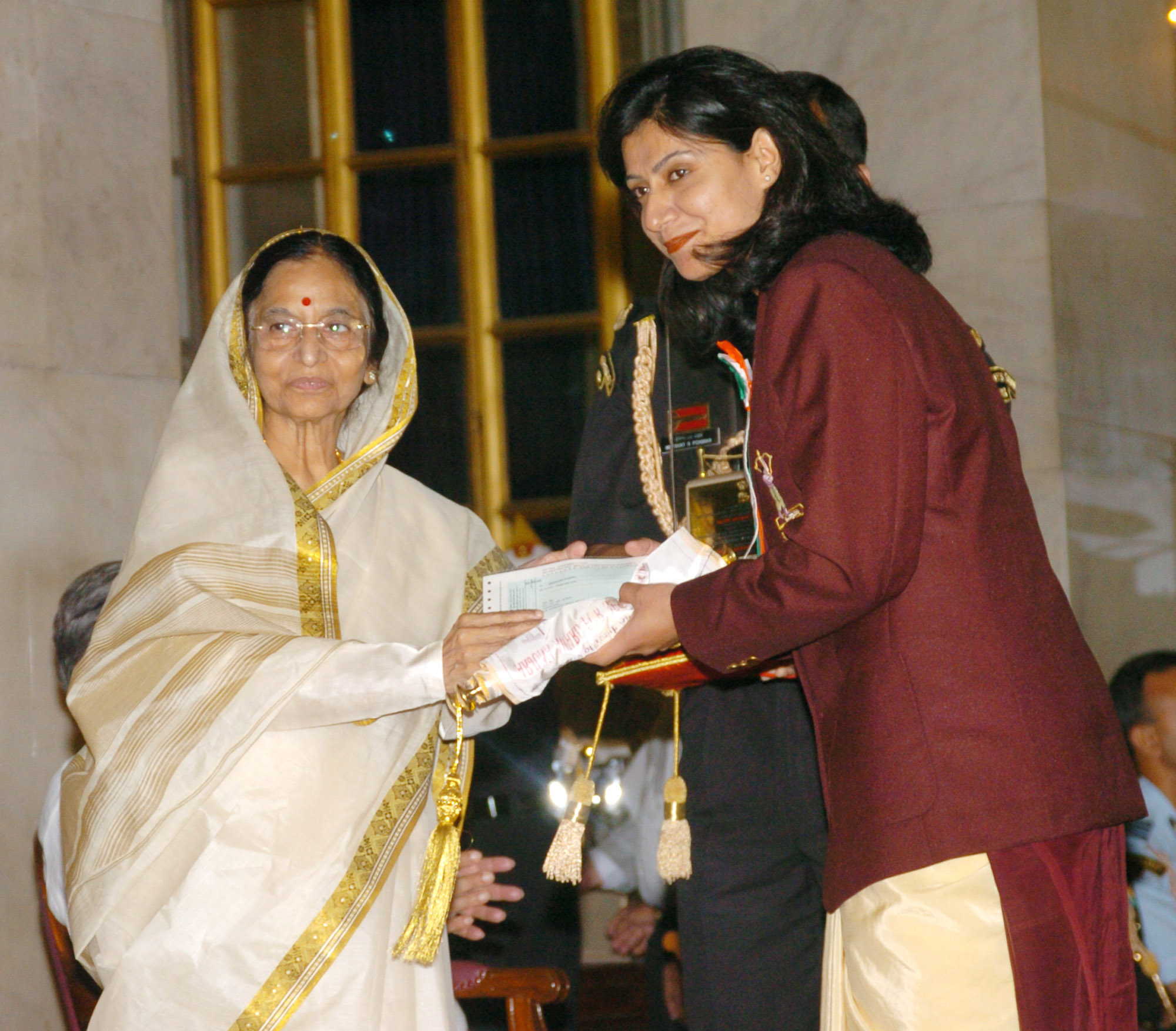
The President, Smt. Pratibha Patil presenting the Arjuna Award -2006 to Ms. Anjum Chopra for Cricket at a glittering function, in New Delhi on August 29, 2007

Year	Award	Notes
2014	Padma Shri	
2007	Arjuna Award	
2004	Rajiv Gandhi Delhi state award	
2000	ICC Player of the Match	
2005	ICC Player of the Match	
2009	ICC Player of the Match	
2002	Shiromani Desh Sewa Rattan Award	Presented by Shaheed memorial international Sewa society, Ludhiana
2004	Award of Honour for exemplary contribution in the Field of Cricket	Presented during forum of women in public sector
2008	Zee Astitva Award – 'Award for exemplary Women'	
2009	FICCI – YFLO- Young Women Achievers Award	
2011	Award for contribution to Field of Sports	Presented during National Progressive schools conference
2012	Alumni recognition award for public contribution	FORE School of management
2013	Shaksiyat Awards for Outstanding performance in the field of sports	Presented on International women day
2012–13	Exemplary contribution in the field of sports	Presented by Delhi Public School, Indore
2013	Honours in Recognition to the society and nation	Presented by All India National Life insurance Employees Federation on their 50 years (golden jubilee celebration)
2016	Honorary Membership of Marylebone Cricket Club (MCC), Lord's Cricket Ground, London	She is the first Indian woman cricketer to receive it

== Records ==
- First Indian player to score an ODI century for India.
- First captain to win a Test Series abroad. India won the test match in South Africa in 2002 under her captaincy.
- First captain to win a home series 5–0 whitewash against England in India in 2002
- First player to play 100 ODIs for India
- First to play 6 World Cups for India (four ODI World Cups and two T20s)
- Only player in modern-day cricket to have played 12 Test matches with ODI and T20s
- First player to get an international appointment when she worked with Cricket South Africa women's team as a technical consultant in 2012–2013
- First female sportscaster and player to commentate on men's cricket matches

== Achievements ==
Anjum Chopra co-authored the coffee table book titled Women's Cricket World – A Journey from 1745- 2013. The book showcases the world history of the sport to its present-day under the International Cricket Council.

She has also acted in a docudrama, "Poor Cousins of Million Dollar Babies". The film received national acclaim at the Arnold Sports Film Festival in Ohio in 2011. It talks about that despite the disparities between men's and women's cricket, the girls are very happy playing the sport and enjoy the camaraderie.

To promote the game, Anjum has also participated in a reality show, Fear Factor 'Khatron ke Khiladi' season 4, aired on the Colors channel. She has also walked the ramp with leading names of the fashion industry promoting the women's game.

Anjum is a commentator/subject expert with Doordarshan and other leading news and sports channels. A sportscaster she represents women's cricket on television analysing the game from a player's perspective. She has also forayed into other sports, acting as a commentator for the World Kabaddi League in 2014 on Sony Six.

Anjum Chopra is the first woman cricketer from India to be awarded an honorary life membership of the Marylebone Cricket Club (MCC).

== Television ==
Anjum was a participant on the reality show Fear Factor - Khatron Ke Khiladi Season 4.
