= Lakshmibai National Institute of Physical Education =

Deemed university in Madhya Pradesh

- Former name: Lakshmibai College of Physical Education
- Established: 1957; 69 years ago
- Vice-Chancellor: Kalpana Sharma
- Location: Gwalior, Madhya Pradesh, India; 26°13′14″N 78°11′37″E
- Campus: Shaktinagar
- Website: www.lnipe.edu.in

The Lakshmibai National Institute of Physical Education (LNIPE), formerly Lakshmibai National University of Physical Education, is a higher education institute deemed-to-be-university, located in Gwalior, Madhya Pradesh, India. Under the aegis of Ministry of Youth Affairs and Sports and committed for excellence in physical education, coaching and sports in the country. The campus is on the Agra–Mumbai Highway, at a walking distance of around 500m from Gwalior railway station, Shaktinagar, Gwalior.

== History ==
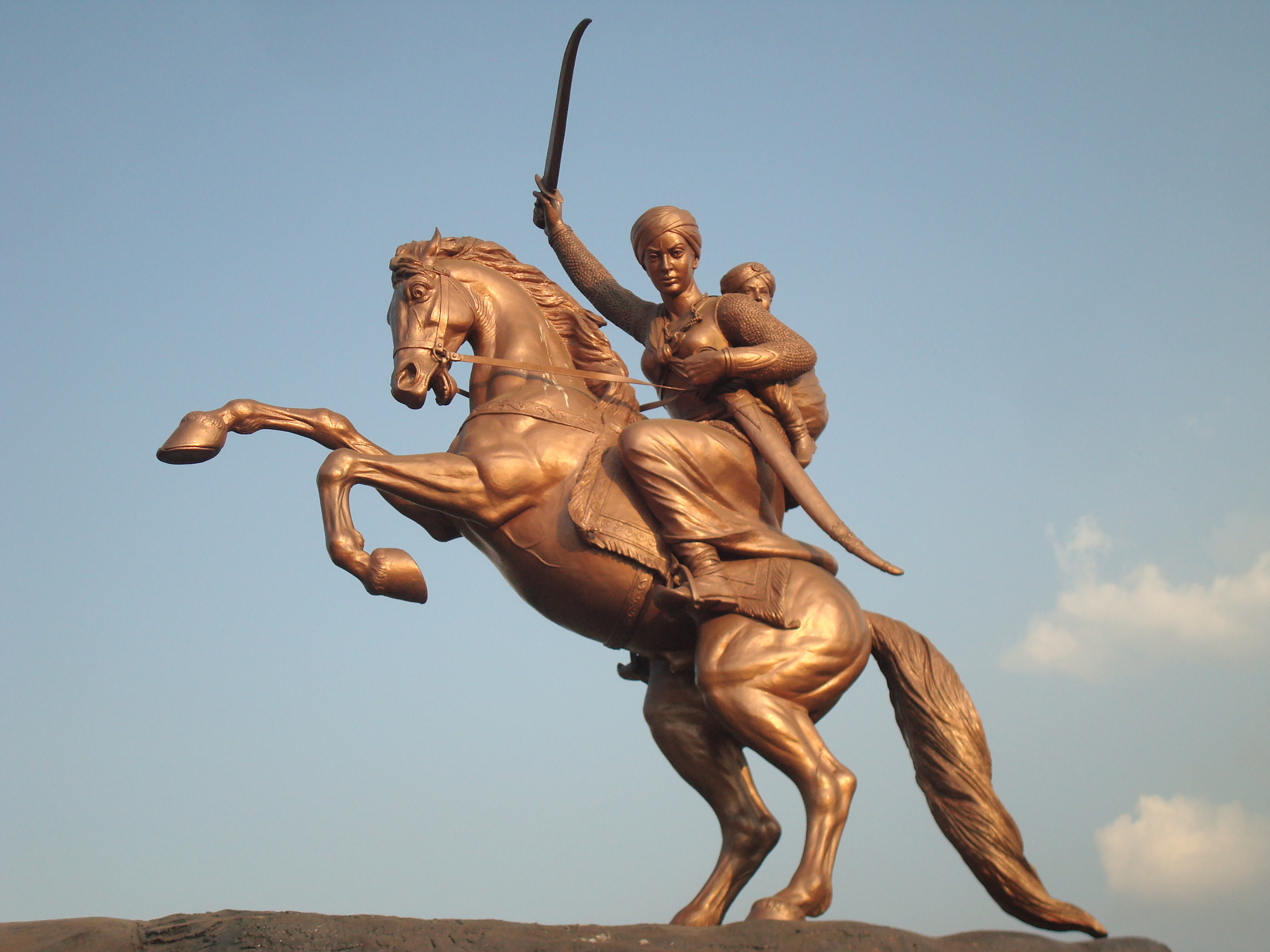
An equestrian statue of Rani Lakshmibai

Lakshmibai National University of Physical Education began its life in 1957, in the form of Lakshmibai College of Physical Education (LCPE), in memory of Rani Lakshmibai of Jhansi, as a college of physical education, affiliated to Vikram University. In 1964, the college was shifted to Jiwaji University.

In 1973, the college was renamed to Lakshmibai National College of Physical Education (LNCPE) and nine years later, in 1982, was upgraded as an autonomous college. A further name change occurred in 1995, to Lakshmibai National Institute of Physical Education. In 2000, the name Lakshmibai National University of Physical Education was accepted when it was declared, by the Government of India, as a deemed university, handing over the affairs to the Ministry of Youth Affairs and Sports, which is funding all its activities. In 2017, it was renamed as Lakshmibai National Institute of Physical Education after a UGC order to not use the word "University" in deemed universities' names.

== Campus ==
LNIPE is in Shaktinagar, Gwalior, Madhya Pradesh, on the Agra - Mumbai Highway, on land measuring 153 acres, which houses a faculty block, auditorium, research block, laboratories and administration building.

== Organisation and administration ==
The institute operates through the following departments:

- Department of Physical Education Pedagogy
- Department of Exercise Physiology
- Department of Sports Psychology
- Department of Sports Biomechanics
- Department of Health Sciences and Fitness
- Centre for Sports Coaching and Management
- Centre for Advanced Studies

It also established three subsidiary centres: the Academic Staff College, the North East Regional Centre and the PYKKA Resource Centre.

== Accreditation ==
Like all universities in India, LNIPE is approved by the University Grants Commission (UGC). It is also accredited by the National Assessment and Accreditation Council (NAAC).

== Publications ==
LNIPE publishes the Indian Journal of Physical Education, Sports Medicine and Exercise Science, an online magazine called LNUPE@Glance and two monthly newsletters, Reflections and LNUPE Talk.

== Notable alumni ==
- Ajeet Singh Yadav
- Ajmer Singh
- Prabhakar Vaidya
- Shaji Prabhakaran
- Gaurav Khanna
- K. P. Thomas

== See also ==
- Sport in India
