= Dronacharya Award =

Indian sports award

Dronacharya award
- Civilian award for Outstanding Coaches in Sports and Games
- Awarded for: Sports coaching honour in India
- Sponsored by: Government of India
- Reward: 15 lakh
- First award: 1985
- Final award: 2024

Highlights
- Total awarded: 159
- First winner: Bhalchandra Bhaskar Bhagwat; Om Prakash Bhardwaj; O. M. Nambiar

The Dronacharya Award, officially known as Dronacharya Award for Outstanding Coaches in Sports and Games, is sports coaching honour of the Republic of India. The award is named after Drona, often referred as "Dronacharya" or "Guru Drona", a character from the Sanskrit epic Mahabharata of ancient India. He was master of advanced military warfare and was appointed as the royal preceptor to the Kaurava and the Pandava princes for their training in military arts and astras (Divine weapons). It is awarded annually by the Ministry of Youth Affairs and Sports. Recipients are selected by a committee constituted by the Ministry and are honoured to have done "outstanding and meritorious work on a consistent basis and enabled sportspersons to excel in international events" over a period of four years. Two awards are designated for the lifetime contribution in coaching where the achievements in producing "outstanding sportspersons" over a period of 20 years or more are considered. As of 2020, the award comprises a bronze statuette of Dronacharya, a certificate, ceremonial dress, and a cash prize of ₹15 lakh (US$16,000). (Note: The cash prize was revised from ₹5 lakh (US$5,300) to ₹25 lakh (US$27,000) in 2020.)

Instituted in 1985, the award is given only to the disciplines included in the events like Olympic Games, Paralympic Games, Asian Games, Commonwealth Games, World Championship and World Cup along with Cricket, Indigenous Games, and Parasports. The nominations for a given year are accepted till 30 April or last working day of April. A ten-member committee evaluates the nominations and later submits their recommendations to the Union Minister of Youth Affairs and Sports for further approval.

The first recipients of the award were Bhalchandra Bhaskar Bhagwat (Wrestling), Om Prakash Bhardwaj (Boxing), and O. M. Nambiar (Athletics), who were honoured in 1985. Usually conferred upon not more than five coaches in a year, a few exceptions have been made (2012 and 2016–2020) when more recipients were awarded in a year.

== Nominations ==
The nominations for the award are received from all government recognised National Sports Federations, the Indian Olympic Association, the Sports Authority of India, the Sports Promotion and Control Boards, and the state and the union territory governments with not more than two eligible coaches nominated for each sports discipline. In case of cricket, the nominations are received from the Board of Control for Cricket in India as there is no National Sports Federation recognised by the Government. The Sports Authority of India (SAI) is authorised to submit the nominations on behalf of all the de-recognised or under suspension National Sports Federations. The previous award recipients of Major Dhyan Chand Khel Ratna, Arjuna Award, Dronacharya Award, and Dhyan Chand Award can also nominate one coach for the discipline for which they themselves were awarded. The Government can nominate up to two coaches in deserving cases where no such nominations have been received from the nominating authorities. The nominations for a given year are accepted till 30 April or last working day of April.

== Selection process ==
All the received nominations are sent to SAI and concerned National Sports Federations for verification against the claimed achievements. The National Anti-Doping Agency is responsible for providing the doping clearance. Any coach associated with a sportsperson who is either penalised or being investigated for use of drugs or substances banned by the World Anti-Doping Agency is not eligible for the award along with the previous award recipients of Dhyan Chand Award. A committee consisting of the Joint Secretary and the Director/Deputy Secretary of Department of Sports, the Secretary and the Executive Director/Director (TEAMS) of SAI verify and validate the nominations.

The valid nominations are considered by a selection committee constituted by the Government. This eleven members committee consists of a Chairperson nominated by the Ministry, two members who are either Olympians or previous recipients of the Major Dhyan Chand Khel Ratna or the Arjuna Award, three previous recipients of the Dronacharya Award of different sports disciplines, two sports journalists/experts/commentators, one sports administrator, the Director General of SAI, and the Joint Secretary of Department of Sports, with not more than one sportsperson from any particular discipline being included in the committee. The medals won in various International championships and events in disciplines included in Summer and Winter Olympic and Paralympics Games, Asian Games, and Commonwealth Games are given 80% weightage. The remaining 20% weightage is given to the profile and standard of the events where their trainees have won the medals. For any other games not included in Olympic, Asian Games, and Commonwealth Games like cricket and indigenous games, individual performances are taken into consideration. Coach with maximum points is given 80 marks, while the remaining coaches are given marks in proportion to the maximum points. For team events, marks are given per the strength of the team. Following are the points defined for medals at the given events:

Points given to coach for winning medals by their trainee during the last four years
	Gold	Silver	Bronze
Olympic Games/Paralympic Games	80	70	55
World Championship/World Cup (Note: A World Championship/World Cup is generally organised every four years. For different cyclicities, proportionate marks are given.)	40	30	20
Asian Games	30	25	20
Commonwealth Games	25	20	15

For a given discipline, not more than two coaches, one male and one female, are given highest marks. The committee may not recommend the award to the coach with the highest marks across disciplines but can only recommend the recipient of the highest aggregate marks in a particular sports discipline. The recommendations of the selection committee are submitted to the Ministry of Youth Affairs and Sports for further approval.

== Recipients ==
Key
§ Indicates Para sports	# Indicates a posthumous honour

List of award recipients, showing the year and discipline(s)
Year	Recipient(s)	Discipline(s)	Refs.
1985	Bhalachandra Bhaskar Bhagwat	Wrestling	
1985	Om Prakash Bhardwaj	Boxing	
1985	O. M. Nambiar	Athletics	
1986	Desh Prem Azad	Cricket	
1986	Raghunandan Vasant Gokhle	Chess	
1987	Guru Hanuman	Wrestling	
1987	Gurcharan Singh	Cricket	
1988	No award		
1989	No award		
1990	Ramakant Achrekar	Cricket	
1990	Syed Naeemuddin	Football	
1990	A. Ramana Rao	Volleyball	
1991	No award		
1992	No award		
1993	No award		
1994	Ilyas Babar	Athletics	
1995	Shyam Sunder Rao	Volleyball	
1995	Karan Singh	Athletics	
1996	Wilson Jones	Billiards & Snooker	
1996	Pal Singh Sandhu	Weightlifting	
1997	Joginder Singh Saini	Athletics	
1998	G. S. Sandhu	Boxing	
1998	Hargobind Singh Sandhu	Athletics	
1998	Bahadur Singh Chouhan	Athletics	
1999	Kenneth Owen Bosen	Athletics	
1999	Hawa Singh^{#}	Boxing	
1999	Ajay Kumar Sirohi	Weightlifting	
2000	S. M. Arif	Badminton	
2000	Gudial Singh Bhangu	Hockey	
2000	Bhupender Dhawan	Powerlifting	
2000	Gopal Purushottam Phadke	Kho kho	
2000	Hansa Sharma	Weightlifting	
2001	Michael Ferreira	Billiards & Snooker	
2001	Sunny Thomas	Shooting	
2002	Maharaj Krishan Kaushik	Hockey	
2002	Renu Kohli	Athletics	
2002	Homi Motivala	Yachting	
2002	E. Prasad Rao	Kabaddi	
2002	Jaswant Singh	Athletics	
2003	Sukhchain Singh Cheema	Wrestling	
2003	Robert Bobby George	Athletics	
2003	Anoop Kumar	Boxing	
2003	Rajinder Singh Jr.	Hockey	
2004	Cyrus Poncha	Squash	
2004	Arvind Savur	Billiards & Snooker	
2004	Sunita Sharma	Cricket	
2005	Ismail Baig	Rowing	
2005	Maha Singh Rao	Wrestling	
2005	Balwan Singh	Kabaddi	
2005	M. Venu	Boxing	
2006	Koneru Ashok	Chess	
2006	Damodaran Chandralal	Boxing	
2006	R. D. Singh	Athletics	
2007	Jagdish Singh	Boxing	
2007	Jagminder Singh	Wrestling	
2007	Sanjeeva Kumar Singh	Archery	
2007	G. E. Sridharan	Volleyball	
2008	No award		
2009	Jaydev Bisht	Boxing	
2009	Pullela Gopichand	Badminton	
2009	S. Baldev Singh	Hockey	
2009	Satpal Singh	Wrestling	
2010	Subhash Agarwal	Billiards & Snooker	
2010	Ajay Kumar Bansal	Hockey	
2010	Captain Chandrup	Wrestling	
2010	A. K. Kutty	Athletics	
2010	L Ibomcha Singh	Boxing	
2011	Devender Kumar Rathore	Gymnastics	
2011	Ramphal	Wrestling	
2011	Inukurthi Venkateshwara Roy	Boxing	
2012	Sunil Dabas	Kabaddi	
2012	B. I. Fernandez	Boxing	
2012	Virender Poonia	Athletics	
2012	Satyapal Singh	Athletics§	
2012	Harendra Singh	Hockey	
2012	Yashvir Singh	Wrestling	
2013	Purnima Mahato	Archery	
2013	Narender Singh Saini	Hockey	
2013	Mahavir Singh	Boxing	
2014	Mahabir Prasad	Wrestling	
2015	Anoop Singh Dahiya	Wrestling	
2015	Naval Singh	Athletics§	
2016	Sagar Mal Dhayal	Boxing	
2016	Bishweshwar Nandi	Gymnastics	
2016	Nagapuri Ramesh	Athletics	
2016	Rajkumar Sharma	Cricket	
2017	R. Gandhi^{#}	Athletics	
2017	Heera Nand Kataria	Kabaddi	
2018	Subedar Chenanda Achaiah Kuttappa	Boxing	
2018	Vijay Sharma	Weightlifting	
2018	A. Srinivasa Rao	Table Tennis	
2018	Sukhdev Singh Pannu	Athletics	
2019	Mohinder Singh Dhillon	Athletics	
2019	U. Vimal Kumar	Badminton	
2019	Sandip Gupta	Table Tennis	
2020	Jude Sebastian	Hockey	
2020	Yogesh Malviya	Mallakhamb	
2020	Jaspal Rana	Shooting	
2020	Kuldeep Kumar Handoo	Wushu	
2020	Gaurav Khanna	Badminton§	
2021	Radhakrishnan Nair	Athletics	
2021	Sandhya Gurung	Boxing	
2021	Pritam Siwach	Hockey	
2021	Jai Prakash Nautiyal	Shooting§	
2021	Subramanian Raman	Table Tennis	
2022	Jiwanjot Singh Teja	Archery	
2022	Mohammed Ali Qamar	Boxing	
2022	Suma Shirur	Shooting§	
2022	Sujeet Maan	Wrestling	
2023	Lalit Kumar	Wrestling	
2023	Ramachandran Ramesh	Chess	
2023	Mahaveer Prasad Saini	Athetics§	
2023	Shivendra Singh	Hockey	
2023	Ganesh Prabhakar Devrukhkar	Mallakhamb	
2024	Subhash Rana	Shooting§	
2024	Deepali Deshpande	Shooting	
2024	Sandeep Sangwan	Hockey	
2025	Parveer Singh	Athletics	
2025	Chhote Lal Yadav	Boxing	
2025	Neha Nandkumar Chavan	Shooting	

List of lifetime award recipients, showing the year and discipline(s)
Year	Lifetime Recipient(s)	Discipline(s)	Refs.
2011	Kuntal Kumar Roy	Athletics	
2011	Rajinder Singh Jr.	Hockey	
2012	Jasvinder Singh Bhatia	Athletics	
2012	Bhawani Mukherjee	Table Tennis	
2013	Raj Singh	Wrestling	
2013	K. P. Thomas	Athletics	
2014	Gurcharan Gogi	Judo	
2014	Jose Jacob	Rowing	
2014	N. Lingappa	Athletics	
2014	Ganapathy Manoharan	Boxing	
2015	Nihar Ameen	Swimming	
2015	Harbans Singh	Athletics	
2015	Swatantar Raj Singh	Boxing	
2016	S. Pradeep Kumar	Swimming	
2016	Mahavir Singh Phogat	Wrestling	
2017	G. S. S. V. Prasad	Badminton	
2017	Brij Bhushan Mohanty	Boxing	
2017	P. A. Raphel	Hockey	
2017	Sanjoy Chakraverty	Shooting	
2017	Roshan Lal	Wrestling	
2018	Clarence Lobo	Hockey	
2018	Tarak Sinha	Cricket	
2018	Jiwan Kumar Sharma	Judo	
2018	V. R. Beedu	Athletics	
2019	Rambir Singh Khokar	Kabaddi	
2019	Sanjay Bhardwaj	Cricket	
2019	Merzban Patel	Hockey	
2020	Dharmendra Tiwary	Archery	
2020	Purushotham Rai	Athletics	
2020	Shiv Singh	Boxing	
2020	Romesh Pathania	Hockey	
2020	Krishan Kumar Hooda	Kabaddi	
2020	Vijay Bhalchandra Munishwar	Powerlifting§	
2020	Naresh Kumar	Tennis	
2020	Om Parkash Dahiya	Wrestling	
2021	T. P. Ouseph	Athletics	
2021	Sarkar Talwar	Cricket	
2021	Sarpal Singh	Hockey	
2021	Ashan Kumar	Kabaddi	
2021	Tapan Kumar Panigrahi	Swimming	
2022	Dinesh Jawahar Lad	Cricket	
2022	Bimal Prafulla Ghosh	Football	
2022	Raj Singh	Wrestling	
2023	Jaskirat Singh Grewal	Golf	
2023	Bhaskaran E	Kabaddi	
2023	Jayanta Kumar Pushilal	Table Tennis	
2024	S Muralidharan	Badminton	
2024	Armando Colaco	Football	
2025	Dharmendra Singh Yadav	Boxing	
2025	Virender Kumar	Wrestling	

== Controversies ==
Some of the recipients have been accused of falsely claiming the achievements of the medalist under their names. Satpal Singh (2009), Ramphal (2011), and Yashvir Singh (2012) had mentioned two times Olympic medal winning wrestler Sushil Kumar (2008 and 2012) as their trainee. The award for year 2012 was bestowed upon para sports athletics coach Satyapal Singh. However, 2010 Arjuna Award winning para athlete Jagseer Singh accused Satyapal Singh for falsely mentioning him as their trainee for the award. Jagseer Singh mentioned that 2006 Dronacharya Award winner R. D. Singh was appointed as the main coach and Satyapal Singh was an assisting coach. Jagseer was informed about such claim via Right to Information Act, 2005 which had him mentioned as the primary trainee by Satyapal Singh. 2013 award winner Raj Singh also claimed Sushil Kumar and 2012 Summer Olympics medal winning wrestler Yogeshwar Dutt as their trainee. Following an announcement, in August 2015, a Public-Interest Litigation was filed in the Delhi High Court by Vinod Kumar. The petitioner, former chief wrestling coach, mentioned that he was the chief national coach of men's freestyle wrestling team from November 2010 to April 2015 and claimed that he had more points (420) than the recipient Anoop Singh Dahiya (375). The court directed the Ministry to confer the award on Kumar and provided one week to the Ministry to challenge the decision. However, the Ministry did not change their decision as the Wrestling Federation of India (WFI) had sacked Kumar in May 2015.
