= Sunita Sharma (cricket coach) =

Indian cricket coach

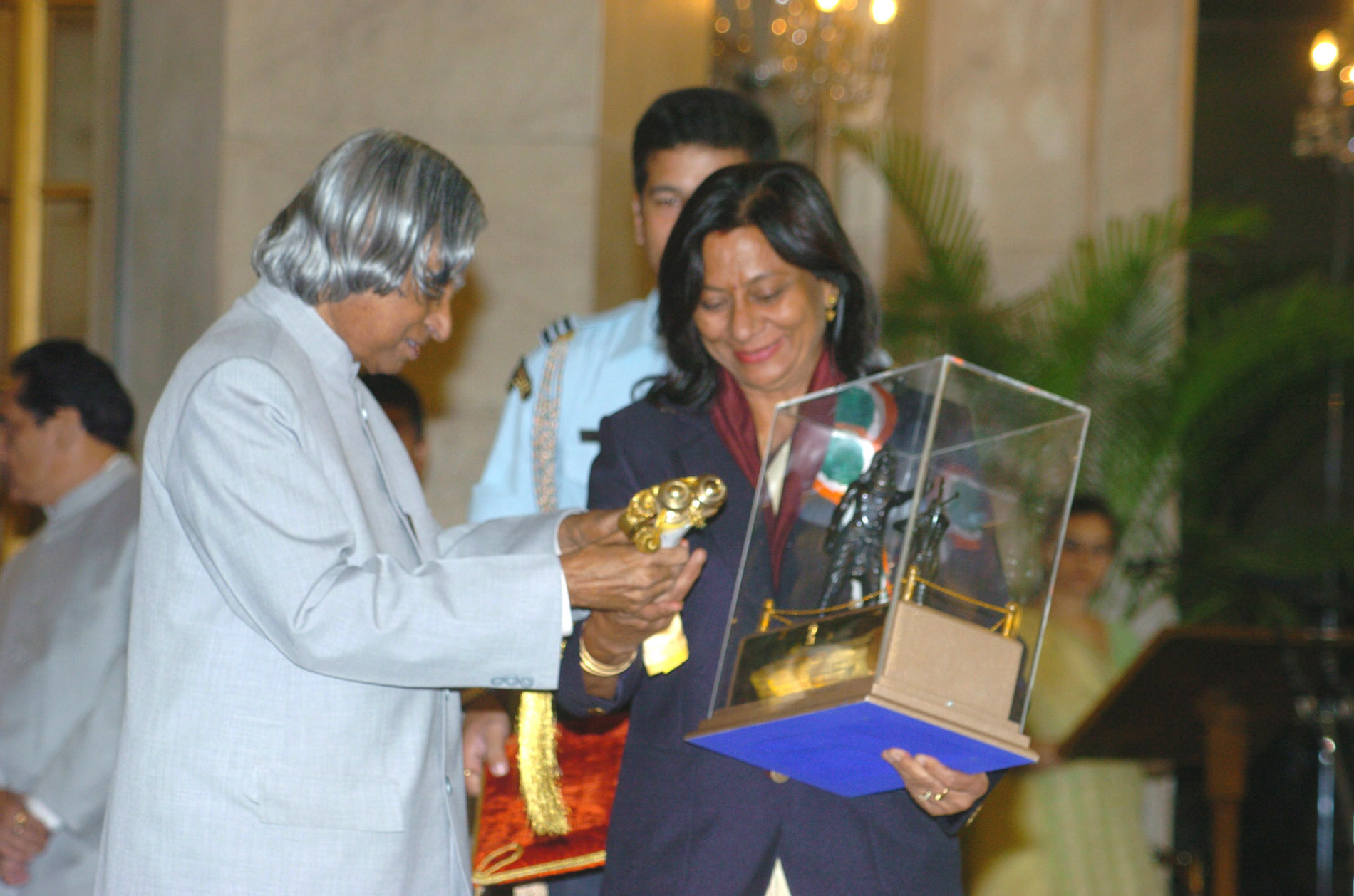
Sharma receiving the Dronacharya Award from President A. P. J. Abdul Kalam in August 2005.

Sunita Sharma is reportedly India's first woman cricket coach and a former cricketer. Having trained dozens of first-class and international cricketers, she received the Dronacharya Award in 2005.

== Early life and playing career ==
A sports fan from childhood, Sharma played kho kho at the national level before gradually developing interest in cricket. Having lost her father at age four, it was her mother who advised her to take up the relatively more popular sport of cricket so that she could make a career out of it. Sharma soon rose up the ranks as a medium pace bowler and was selected in the national team. She claims that despite being part of the playing eleven of a Test match against Australia in 1975 she was left out on the morning of the match.

== Coaching career ==
Noticing her lack of interest in academics, Sharma's mother enrolled her into a cricket coaching programme in Janki Devi Memorial College in Delhi. In 1976, she became the first woman to receive a coaching diploma from the National Institute of Sports in Patiala. According to Sharma, people were reluctant to send their children to her as they preferred male coaches but "people found out that I am equally capable as compared to my male colleagues" after one year. She credited the media who used to "write about me and appreciate my work. All that gave me enough strength to carry on initially."

Over the years, Sharma coached dozens of men and women cricketers who went on to play at international and first-class level. She is reportedly India's first woman cricket coach. Some of her women trainees who played at the international level are Manimala Singhal, Shashi Gupta, Anju Jain, and Anjum Chopra. Between 1975 and 1990, Sharma also conducted coaching camps for international cricketers where the likes of Shantha Rangaswamy, Diana Edulji, Gargi Banerji, Sandhya Agarwal and Shubhangi Kulkarni underwent training. She was the coach of Deep Dasgupta, who played for the men's national team, since he was seven years of age. Since the early-1980s, she trained Indian team probables at Sports Authority of India's National Stadium Cricket Academy in Delhi. She later worked as a coach and manager of the women's national team. She briefly worked on the national women's team selection committee until 2015 when the Board of Control for Cricket in India (BCCI) removed her because she had not played international cricket.

In July 2002, the Women's Cricket Association of India (WCAI) recommended her for the Dronacharya Award. She received the award in 2005.
