= Desh Azad =

Indian cricketer (1938–2013)

Personal information
- Full name: Desh Prem Azad
- Born: 2 February 1938; Amritsar, Punjab Province, British India
- Died: 16 August 2013 (aged 75); Mohali, Punjab, India
- Batting: Right-handed

Domestic team information
- Years: Team
- Haryana

Career statistics
Competition	FC
Matches	19
Runs scored	658
Batting average	20.56
100s/50s	0/5
Top score	83
Balls bowled	532
Wickets	8
Bowling average	40.75
5 wickets in innings	0
10 wickets in match	0
Best bowling	2-51
Catches/stumpings	10/0
- Source: ESPNcricinfo

Desh Azad (2 February 1938 – 16 August 2013) was an Indian cricketer and cricket coach.

== Cricket career ==
He played nineteen first-class cricket matches representing Haryana, Maharaja of Patiala's XI and Southern Punjab between 1953 and 1973 in which he scored 658 runs and took eight wickets. He also served as match referee in two Under-19 matches between India and Australia in 2005.

== Coaching career ==
However, it was as coach that he was best known. India's 1983 World Cup winning captain Kapil Dev was the most famous of his students. The other cricketers he coached included Chetan Sharma who took the first hat-trick in Cricket World Cup history, Yograj Singh and Ashok Malhotra.

In 1986, he was honoured with the Dronacharya Award for his services to cricket coaching.
