= 1987 World Championships in Athletics – Men's 110 metres hurdles =

These are the official results of the Men's 110 metres Hurdles event at the 1987 IAAF World Championships in Rome, Italy. There were a total number of 39 participating athletes, with five qualifying heats, two semi-finals and the final held on Thursday September 3, 1987.

== Medalists ==
Gold	Greg Foster; United States (USA)
Silver	(United Kingdom) Jonathan Ridgeon; Great Britain (GBR)
Bronze	(United Kingdom) Colin Jackson; Great Britain (GBR)

== Records ==
Existing records at the start of the event.

World Record	Renaldo Nehemiah (USA)	12.93	Zürich, Switzerland	August 19, 1981
Championship Record	Greg Foster (USA)	13.22	Helsinki, Finland	August 12, 1983

== Final ==
RANK	FINAL wind +0.5	TIME
	Greg Foster (USA)	13.21
	Jonathan Ridgeon (GBR)	13.29
	Colin Jackson (GBR)	13.38
4.	Jack Pierce (USA)	13.41
5.	Igors Kazanovs (URS)	13.48
6.	Carlos Sala (ESP)	13.55
7.	Mark McKoy (CAN)	13.71
—	Arto Bryggare (FIN)	DNS

== Semi-finals ==
- Held on Tuesday 1987-09-01

RANK	HEAT 1 wind -0.5	TIME
1.	Jonathan Ridgeon (GBR)	13.34
2.	Greg Foster (USA)	13.41
3.	Carlos Sala (ESP)	13.60
4.	Arto Bryggare (FIN)	13.62
5.	Aleksandr Markin (URS)	13.63
6.	Krzysztof Płatek (POL)	13.68
7.	Aleš Höffer (TCH)	13.78
8.	Florian Schwarthoff (FRG)	13.98

RANK	HEAT 2 wind -1.2	TIME
1.	Mark McKoy (CAN)	13.42
2.	Jack Pierce (USA)	13.45
3.	Igors Kazanovs (URS)	13.58
4.	Colin Jackson (GBR)	13.58
5.	Stéphane Caristan (FRA)	13.62
6.	Nigel Walker (GBR)	13.68
7.	György Bakos (HUN)	13.90
8.	Jiří Hudec (TCH)	14.06

== Qualifying heats ==
- Held on Tuesday 1987-09-01

RANK	HEAT 1 wind +1.4	TIME
1.	Greg Foster (USA)	13.20
2.	Colin Jackson (GBR)	13.37
3.	Carlos Sala (ESP)	13.48
4.	Jiří Hudec (TCH)	13.48
5.	Florian Schwarthoff (FRG)	13.72
6.	Fabien Niederhauser (SUI)	14.04
7.	Erik Jensen (DEN)	14.06
8.	Mauricio Carranza (ESA)	15.67

RANK	HEAT 2 wind +0.4	TIME
1.	Mark McKoy (CAN)	13.50
2.	Arto Bryggare (FIN)	13.62
3.	Krzysztof Płatek (POL)	13.63
4.	Lyndon Campos (BRA)	13.91
5.	Andrew Parker (JAM)	13.94
6.	Yu Zhicheng (CHN)	13.97
7.	Antonio Lanau (ESP)	14.25
8.	Wu Ching-Jing (TPE)	14.45

RANK	HEAT 3 wind +0.2	TIME
1.	Jonathan Ridgeon (GBR)	13.46
2.	Aleksandr Markin (URS)	13.56
3.	Aleš Höffer (TCH)	13.70
4.	Mikael Ylostalo (FIN)	13.90
5.	Ulf Söderman (SWE)	14.01
6.	Luigi Bertocchi (ITA)	14.02
7.	Judex Lefou (MRI)	14.35
—	Javier Moracho (ESP)	DNS

RANK	HEAT 4 wind +0.4	TIME
1.	Jack Pierce (USA)	13.61
2.	Nigel Walker (GBR)	13.62
3.	Igors Kazanovs (URS)	13.80
4.	Thomas Kearns (IRL)	14.02
5.	Derek Knowles (BAH)	14.39
6.	João Lima (POR)	14.41
—	Jean-Marc Muster (SUI)	DNF
—	Steve Kerho (CAN)	DNS

RANK	HEAT 5 wind +0.9	TIME
1.	Stéphane Caristan (FRA)	13.44
2.	György Bakos (HUN)	13.76
3.	Cletus Clark (USA)	13.81
4.	Michael Radzey (FRG)	13.82
5.	Gianni Tozzi (ITA)	13.87
6.	Sergey Usov (URS)	13.90
—	Alain Cuypers (BEL)	DNF

== See also ==
- 1983 Men's World Championships 110m Hurdles (Helsinki)
- 1984 Men's Olympic 110m Hurdles (Los Angeles)
- 1986 Men's European Championships 110m Hurdles (Stuttgart)
- 1988 Men's Olympic 110m Hurdles (Seoul)
- 1991 Men's World Championships 110m Hurdles (Tokyo)
