= Athletics at the 1988 Summer Olympics – Men's 110 metres hurdles =

Men's 110 metres hurdles at the Games of the XXIV Olympiad
- Seoul Olympic Stadium (2012)
- Venue: Olympic Stadium
- Date: 25 & 26 September
- Competitors: 41 from 31 nations
- Winning time: 12.98 OR

Medalists
| 1st place, gold medalist(s) | | Roger Kingdom; United States |
| 2nd place, silver medalist(s) | | Colin Jackson; Great Britain |
| 3rd place, bronze medalist(s) | | Tonie Campbell; United States |

The men's 110 metres hurdles at the 1988 Summer Olympics in Seoul, South Korea had an entry list of 43 competitors from 31 nations, with six qualifying heats (43 runners), four second-round races (32) and two semifinals (16) before the final (8) took place on Monday September 26, 1988. The maximum number of athletes per nation had been set at 3 since the 1930 Olympic Congress. The event was won by Roger Kingdom of the United States, the second man to successfully defend Olympic gold in the event (Lee Calhoun, 1956 and 1960). It was the nation's 17th title in the event. Colin Jackson's silver was Great Britain's first medal in the event since 1936.

== Background ==
This was the 21st appearance of the event, which is one of 12 athletics events to have been held at every Summer Olympics. Four finalists from 1984 returned: gold medalist Roger Kingdom of the United States, fourth-place finisher Mark McKoy of Canada, sixth-place finisher Stéphane Caristan of France, and seventh-place finisher Carlos Sala of Spain. Kingdom was a favorite to repeat, having recovered from two hamstring injuries that had plagued him between Games. His biggest competitor was countryman Greg Foster, who had won the 1987 World Championship, but Foster was forced to withdraw after he broke his arm in a race fall before the U.S. Olympic trials. The next two placers at worlds were the Brits Colin Jackson and Jon Ridgeon, who were expected to challenge Kingdom.

Benin, Fiji, Guyana, South Korea, Mauritius, Nepal, Qatar, and Saudi Arabia each made their first appearance in the event. The United States made its 20th appearance, most of any nation (having missed only the boycotted 1980 Games).

== Competition format ==
The competition expanded to a four-round format (previously used once in 1960), still using the eight-man semifinals and finals used since 1964. The "fastest loser" system, also introduced in 1964, was used in the first round.

The first round consisted of six heats, with 7 or 8 hurdlers each. The top five hurdlers in each heat, along with the two next fastest overall, advanced to the semifinals. The 32 quarterfinalists were divided into four heats of 8 hurdlers each, with the top four in each heat advancing. The 16 semifinalists were divided into two semifinals of 8 hurdlers each; again, the top four hurdlers in each advanced to the 8-man final.

== Records ==
These were the standing world and Olympic records (in seconds) prior to the 1988 Summer Olympics.

| World record | Renaldo Nehemiah (USA) | 12.93 | Zürich, Switzerland | 19 August 1981 |
| Olympic record | Roger Kingdom (USA) | 13.20 | Los Angeles, United States | 6 August 1984 |

Kingdom broke his own Olympic record in the quarterfinals, with 13.17 seconds, then again in the final with 12.98 seconds.

== Schedule ==
All times are Korea Standard Time adjusted for daylight savings (UTC+10)

| Date | Time | Round |
|---|---|---|
| Sunday, 25 September 1988 | 11:25; 13:14 | Round 1 Quarterfinals |
| Monday, 26 September 1988 | 13:07; 15:38 | Semifinals; Final |

== Results ==
=== Round 1 ===
==== Heat 1 ====
| Rank | Lane | Athlete | Nation | Time | Notes |
|---|---|---|---|---|---|
| 1 | 3 | Colin Jackson | Great Britain | 13.50 | Q |
| 2 | 7 | Stéphane Caristan | France | 13.96 | Q |
| 3 | 4 | Andrew Parker | Jamaica | 14.00 | Q |
| 4 | 8 | Florian Schwarthoff | West Germany | 14.13 | Q |
| 5 | 1 | Noureddine Tadjine | Algeria | 14.36 | Q |
| 6 | 2 | Rashid Marzouq Al-Abdulla | Qatar | 14.69 | q |
| 7 | 5 | José de Souza | Benin | 15.05 | |
| — | 6 | Lyndon Campos | Brazil | DNS | |
| | | | | Wind: +0.0 m/s | |

==== Heat 2 ====
| Rank | Lane | Athlete | Nation | Time | Notes |
|---|---|---|---|---|---|
| 1 | 3 | Tonie Campbell | United States | 13.45 | Q |
| 2 | 5 | Yu Zhicheng | China | 14.07 | Q |
| 3 | 2 | Aleksandr Markin | Soviet Union | 14.17 | Q |
| 4 | 4 | Thomas Kearns | Ireland | 14.17 | Q |
| 5 | 7 | Modesto Castillo | Dominican Republic | 14.40 | Q |
| 6 | 6 | Judex Lefou | Mauritius | 14.73 | |
| — | 1 | Stephen Kerho | Canada | DNF | |
| | | | | Wind: -0.2 m/s | |

==== Heat 3 ====
| Rank | Lane | Athlete | Nation | Time | Notes |
|---|---|---|---|---|---|
| 1 | 1 | Roger Kingdom | United States | 13.40 | Q |
| 2 | 2 | Tony Jarrett | Great Britain | 13.45 | Q |
| 3 | 3 | Yang Guang | China | 14.01 | Q |
| 4 | 7 | Derrick Knowles | Bahamas | 14.22 | Q |
| 5 | 6 | Zeyad Abdulrazak | Kuwait | 14.44 | Q |
| 6 | 5 | Youssef Al-Dosari | Saudi Arabia | 15.03 | |
| — | 4 | Benjamin Grant | Sierra Leone | DNS | |
| | | | | Wind: +0.8 m/s | |

==== Heat 4 ====
| Rank | Lane | Athlete | Nation | Time | Notes |
|---|---|---|---|---|---|
| 1 | 4 | Mark McKoy | Canada | 13.78 | Q |
| 2 | 5 | Jiří Hudec | Czechoslovakia | 13.78 | Q |
| 3 | 3 | Philippe Tourret | France | 13.88 | Q |
| 4 | 7 | Alain Cuypers | Belgium | 13.89 | Q |
| 5 | 6 | Javier Moracho | Spain | 13.96 | Q |
| 6 | 2 | Wu Chin-Jing | Chinese Taipei | 14.11 | q |
| 7 | 1 | Dambar Kunwar | Nepal | 16.51 | |
| | | | | Wind: +0.3 m/s | |

==== Heat 5 ====
| Rank | Lane | Athlete | Nation | Time | Notes |
|---|---|---|---|---|---|
| 1 | 3 | Vladimir Shishkin | Soviet Union | 13.75 | Q |
| 2 | 6 | Mikael Ylöstalo | Finland | 13.87 | Q |
| 3 | 2 | Erik Jensen | Denmark | 13.91 | Q |
| 4 | 4 | Carlos Sala | Spain | 14.00 | Q |
| 5 | 1 | Kim Jin-tae | South Korea | 14.06 | Q |
| 6 | 7 | João Lima | Portugal | 14.73 | |
| 7 | 5 | Albert Miller | Fiji | 14.86 | |
| | | | | Wind: +1.0 m/s | |

==== Heat 6 ====
| Rank | Lane | Athlete | Nation | Time | Notes |
|---|---|---|---|---|---|
| 1 | 3 | Arthur Blake | United States | 13.66 | Q |
| 2 | 2 | Jonathan Ridgeon | Great Britain | 13.75 | Q |
| 3 | 5 | Richard Bucknor | Jamaica | 13.89 | Q |
| 4 | 4 | György Bakos | Hungary | 13.94 | Q |
| 5 | 7 | Nagi Ghazi Moursine | Iraq | 14.46 | Q |
| 6 | 1 | Curt Hampstead | Guyana | 14.88 | |
| 7 | 6 | Roberto Carmona | Mexico | 15.24 | |
| | | | | Wind: +0.9 m/s | |

==== Overall results for round 1 ====
| Rank | Heat | Athlete | Nation | Time | Notes |
|---|---|---|---|---|---|
| 1 | 3 | Roger Kingdom | United States | 13.40 | Q |
| 2 | 2 | Tonie Campbell | United States | 13.45 | Q |
| 2 | 3 | Tony Jarrett | Great Britain | 13.45 | Q |
| 4 | 1 | Colin Jackson | Great Britain | 13.50 | Q |
| 5 | 6 | Arthur Blake | United States | 13.66 | Q |
| 6 | 5 | Vladimir Shishkin | Soviet Union | 13.75 | Q |
| 6 | 6 | Jonathan Ridgeon | Great Britain | 13.75 | Q |
| 8 | 4 | Mark McKoy | Canada | 13.78 | Q |
| 8 | 4 | Jiří Hudec | Czechoslovakia | 13.78 | Q |
| 10 | 5 | Mikael Ylöstalo | Finland | 13.87 | Q |
| 11 | 4 | Philippe Tourret | France | 13.88 | Q |
| 12 | 4 | Alain Cuypers | Belgium | 13.89 | Q |
| 12 | 6 | Richard Bucknor | Jamaica | 13.89 | Q |
| 14 | 5 | Erik Jensen | Denmark | 13.91 | Q |
| 15 | 6 | György Bakos | Hungary | 13.94 | Q |
| 16 | 1 | Stéphane Caristan | France | 13.96 | Q |
| 16 | 4 | Javier Moracho | Spain | 13.96 | Q |
| 18 | 1 | Andrew Parker | Jamaica | 14.00 | Q |
| 18 | 5 | Carlos Sala | Spain | 14.00 | Q |
| 20 | 3 | Yang Guang | China | 14.01 | Q |
| 21 | 5 | Kim Jin-tae | South Korea | 14.06 | Q |
| 22 | 2 | Yu Zhicheng | China | 14.07 | Q |
| 23 | 4 | Wu Chin-Jing | Chinese Taipei | 14.11 | q |
| 24 | 1 | Florian Schwarthoff | West Germany | 14.13 | Q |
| 25 | 2 | Aleksandr Markin | Soviet Union | 14.17 | Q |
| 26 | 2 | Thomas Kearns | Ireland | 14.17 | Q |
| 27 | 3 | Derrick Knowles | Bahamas | 14.22 | Q |
| 28 | 1 | Noureddine Tadjine | Algeria | 14.36 | Q |
| 29 | 2 | Modesto Castillo | Dominican Republic | 14.40 | Q |
| 30 | 3 | Zeyad Abdulrazak | Kuwait | 14.44 | Q |
| 31 | 6 | Nagi Ghazi Moursine | Iraq | 14.46 | Q |
| 32 | 1 | Rashid Marzouq Al-Abdulla | Qatar | 14.69 | q |
| 33 | 2 | Judex Lefou | Mauritius | 14.73 | |
| 33 | 5 | João Lima | Portugal | 14.73 | |
| 35 | 5 | Albert Miller | Fiji | 14.86 | |
| 36 | 6 | Curt Hampstead | Guyana | 14.88 | |
| 37 | 3 | Youssef Al-Dosari | Saudi Arabia | 15.03 | |
| 38 | 1 | José de Souza | Benin | 15.05 | |
| 39 | 6 | Roberto Carmona | Mexico | 15.24 | |
| 40 | 4 | Dambar Kunwar | Nepal | 16.51 | |
| — | 2 | Stephen Kerho | Canada | DNF | |
| — | 1 | Lyndon Campos | Brazil | DNS | |
| — | 3 | Benjamin Grant | Sierra Leone | DNS | |

=== Quarterfinals ===
The quarterfinals were held on Sunday 1988-09-25.

==== Quarterfinal 1 ====
| Rank | Lane | Athlete | Nation | Time | Notes |
|---|---|---|---|---|---|
| 1 | 4 | Roger Kingdom | United States | 13.17 | Q, OR |
| 2 | 3 | Mark McKoy | Canada | 13.56 | Q |
| 3 | 5 | Stephane Caristan | France | 13.61 | Q |
| 4 | 6 | Jiří Hudec | Czechoslovakia | 13.65 | Q |
| 5 | 2 | Florian Schwarthoff | West Germany | 13.67 | |
| 6 | 1 | Javier Moracho | Spain | 13.88 | |
| 7 | 7 | Thomas Kearns | Ireland | 14.30 | |
| 8 | 8 | Rashid Marzouq Al-Abdulla | Qatar | 14.47 | |
| | | | | Wind: +0.6 m/s | |

==== Quarterfinal 2 ====
| Rank | Lane | Athlete | Nation | Time | Notes |
|---|---|---|---|---|---|
| 1 | 3 | Tonie Campbell | United States | 13.47 | Q |
| 2 | 6 | Philippe Tourret | France | 13.73 | Q |
| 3 | 5 | Jonathan Ridgeon | Great Britain | 13.74 | Q |
| 4 | 2 | Yu Zhicheng | China | 13.95 | Q |
| 5 | 4 | Erik Jensen | Denmark | 14.02 | |
| 6 | 1 | Andrew Parker | Jamaica | 14.05 | |
| 7 | 8 | Aleksandr Markin | Soviet Union | 14.19 | |
| 8 | 7 | Zeyad Al-Khudhur | Kuwait | 14.56 | |
| | | | | Wind: +1.0 m/s | |

==== Quarterfinal 3 ====
| Rank | Lane | Athlete | Nation | Time | Notes |
|---|---|---|---|---|---|
| 1 | 5 | Tony Jarrett | Great Britain | 13.59 | Q |
| 2 | 3 | Vladimir Shishkin | Soviet Union | 13.60 | Q |
| 3 | 6 | Mikael Ylöstalo | Finland | 13.70 | Q |
| 4 | 1 | Carlos Sala | Spain | 13.77 | Q |
| 5 | 2 | Chin-Jing Wu | Chinese Taipei | 14.23 | |
| 6 | 8 | George Knowles | Bahamas | 14.30 | |
| 7 | 7 | Najil Mohsin | Iraq | 14.47 | |
| 8 | 4 | György Bakos | Hungary | 18.02 | |
| | | | | Wind: +0.2 m/s | |

==== Quarterfinal 4 ====
| Rank | Lane | Athlete | Nation | Time | Notes |
|---|---|---|---|---|---|
| 1 | 4 | Colin Jackson | Great Britain | 13.37 | Q |
| 2 | 6 | Arthur Blake | United States | 13.65 | Q |
| 3 | 3 | Richard Bucknor | Jamaica | 13.91 | Q |
| 4 | 5 | Alain Cuypers | Belgium | 13.97 | Q |
| 5 | 2 | Jin-Tae Kim | South Korea | 14.00 | |
| 6 | 1 | Modesto Castillo | Dominican Republic | 14.21 | |
| 7 | 7 | Yang Guang | China | 14.24 | |
| 8 | 8 | Nourreddine Tadjine | Algeria | 14.35 | |
| | | | | Wind: +0.6 m/s | |

=== Semifinals ===
The semifinals were held on Monday 1988-09-26.

==== Semifinal 1 ====
| Rank | Lane | Athlete | Nation | Time | Notes |
|---|---|---|---|---|---|
| 1 | 5 | Vladimir Shishkin | Soviet Union | 13.46 | Q |
| 2 | 6 | Tonie Campbell | United States | 13.47 | Q |
| 3 | 4 | Colin Jackson | Great Britain | 13.55 | Q |
| 4 | 1 | Jonathan Ridgeon | Great Britain | 13.68 | Q |
| 5 | 3 | Stéphane Caristan | France | 13.71 | |
| 6 | 7 | Carlos Sala | Spain | 13.85 | |
| 7 | 8 | Alain Cuypers | Belgium | 13.92 | |
| 8 | 2 | Richard Bucknor | Jamaica | 13.98 | |
| | | | | Wind: +0.0 m/s | |

==== Semifinal 2 ====
| Rank | Lane | Athlete | Nation | Time | Notes |
|---|---|---|---|---|---|
| 1 | 3 | Roger Kingdom | United States | 13.37 | Q |
| 2 | 4 | Arthur Blake | United States | 13.52 | Q |
| 3 | 5 | Mark McKoy | Canada | 13.54 | Q |
| 4 | 6 | Tony Jarrett | Great Britain | 13.56 | Q |
| 5 | 1 | Jiří Hudec | Czechoslovakia | 13.73 | |
| 6 | 7 | Yu Zhicheng | China | 13.94 | |
| 7 | 8 | Philippe Tourret | France | 13.96 | |
| 8 | 2 | Mikael Ylöstalo | Finland | 14.09 | |
| | | | | Wind: -0.7 m/s | |

=== Final ===
| Rank | Lane | Athlete | Nation | Reaction | Time | Notes |
|---|---|---|---|---|---|---|
| 1st place, gold medalist(s) | 4 | Roger Kingdom | United States | 0.142 | 12.98 | OR |
| 2nd place, silver medalist(s) | 1 | Colin Jackson | Great Britain | 0.131 | 13.28 | |
| 3rd place, bronze medalist(s) | 6 | Tonie Campbell | United States | 0.161 | 13.38 | |
| 4 | 3 | Vladimir Shishkin | Soviet Union | 0.139 | 13.51 | |
| 5 | 7 | Jonathan Ridgeon | Great Britain | 0.150 | 13.52 | |
| 6 | 2 | Tony Jarrett | Great Britain | 0.164 | 13.54 | |
| 7 | 8 | Mark McKoy | Canada | 0.142 | 13.61 | |
| 8 | 5 | Arthur Blake | United States | 0.056 | 13.96 | |
| | | | | Wind: +1.5 m/s | | |

== See also ==
- 1987 Men's World Championships 110m Hurdles (Rome)
- 1990 Men's European Championships 110m Hurdles (Split)
- 1991 Men's World Championships 110m Hurdles (Tokyo)
- 1992 Men's Olympic 110m Hurdles (Barcelona)
