= 2012 in American soccer =

Soccer in the United States
- Season: 2012

Men's soccer
- Supporters' Shield: San Jose Earthquakes
- NASL: San Antonio Scorpions
- USL Pro: Charleston Battery
- NPSL: FC Sonic
- PDL: Forest City London
- US Open Cup: Sporting Kansas City
- MLS Cup: Los Angeles Galaxy

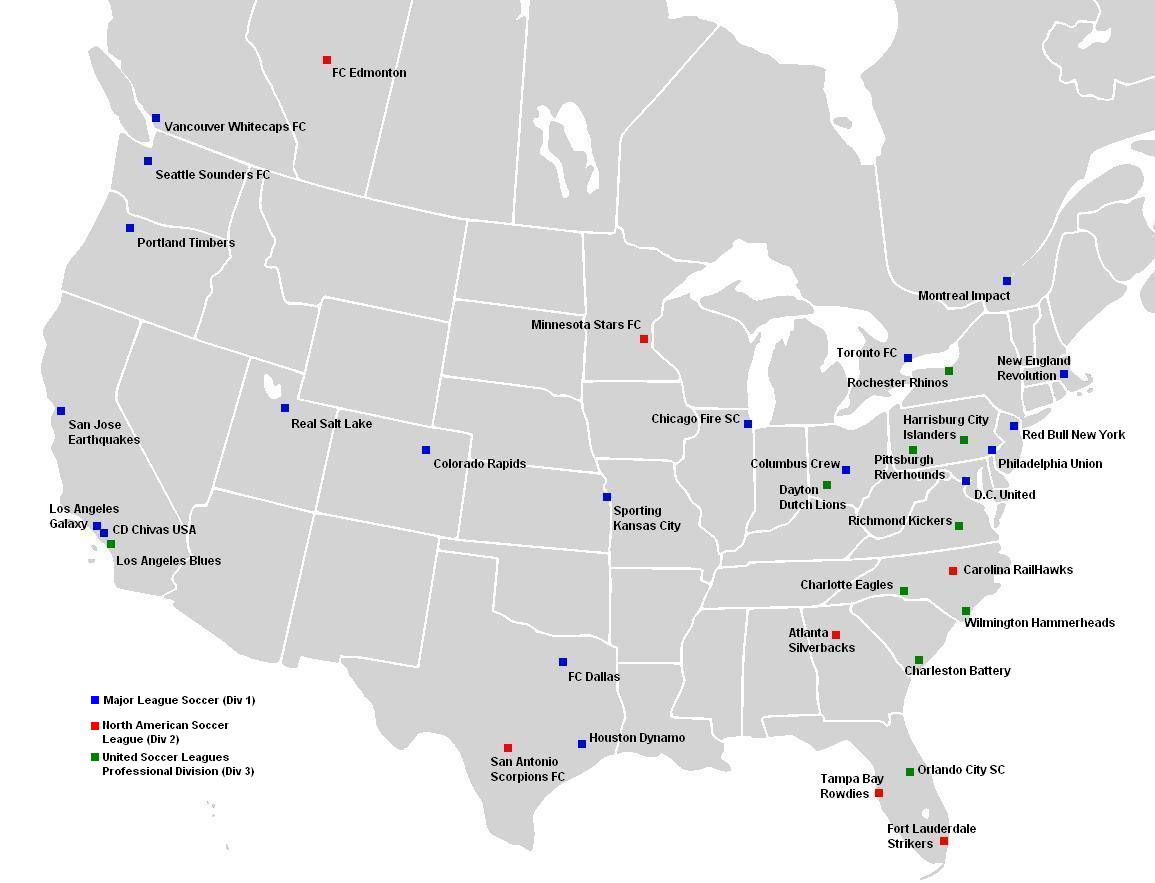
The professional soccer clubs of the United States and Canada, year 2012. Not pictured: NASL or USL Pro clubs based outside the continental United States.

The 2012 season is the 100th season of competitive soccer in the United States.

== National teams ==
=== Men ===
==== Senior ====
Wins	Losses	Draws
9	2	3

January 21 Friendly	United States	1 – 0	Venezuela	Glendale, Arizona
19:00 UTC−07	Jones (yellow card) 67'; Clark 90+7'	Report	Velázquez (red card) 90+8'; Salazar (yellow card) 46'; Flores (yellow card) 90+2'; Rentería (yellow card) 90+3'	Stadium: University of Phoenix Stadium; Attendance: 22,403; Referee: Roberto García (MEX)

January 25 Friendly	Panama	0 – 1	United States	Panama City, Panama
20:30 UTC−05		Report	Zusi 8'; Loyd (yellow card) 14'; Jones (yellow card) 42'; Cameron (red card) 51'; DeLaGarza (yellow card) 73'	Stadium: Estadio Rommel Fernández; Attendance: 15,000; Referee: Francisco Chacon Gutierrez (MEX)

February 29 Friendly	Italy	0 – 1	United States	Genoa, Italy
20:30 UTC+01	Chiellini (yellow card) 67'	Report	Dempsey 55'; Bocanegra (yellow card) 68'	Stadium: Stadio Luigi Ferraris; Attendance: 15,000; Referee: Fırat Aydınus (TUR)

May 26 Friendly	United States	5 – 1	Scotland	Jacksonville, Florida
20:00 UTC−05	Donovan 3', 59', 65'; Bradley 11'; Jones 70'; Bocanegra (yellow card) 28'	Report	Cameron 15' (o.g.)	Stadium: EverBank Field; Attendance: 44,438; Referee: Elmer Bonilla (SLV)

May 30 Friendly	United States	1 – 4	Brazil	Landover, Maryland
20:00 UTC−05	Gomez 45'; Torres (yellow card) 13'; Jones (yellow card) 57'	Report	Neymar 12' (pen.); Silva 26'; Marcelo 52', (yellow card) 60'; Pato 87'; Oscar (yellow card) 19'	Stadium: FedExField; Attendance: 67,619; Referee: Jeffrey Calderón (CRC)

June 3 Friendly	Canada	0 – 0	United States	Toronto, Ontario, Canada
19:00 UTC−05	De Guzman (yellow card) 14'; Hainault (yellow card) 54'	Report	Jones (yellow card) 78'	Stadium: BMO Field; Attendance: 15,247; Referee: Mauricio Morales (MEX)

June 8 WCQ R3	United States	3 – 1	Antigua and Barbuda	Tampa, Florida
19:11 UTC−04	Bocanegra 8'; Dempsey 44' (pen.); Gomez 72'	Report	Byers 65'; Joseph (yellow card) 12'; Griffith (yellow card) 67'	Stadium: Raymond James Stadium; Attendance: 23,971; Referee: Hugo Cruz (CRC)

June 12 WCQ R3	Guatemala	1 – 1	United States	Guatemala City, Guatemala
20:00 UTC−06	Rodríguez (yellow card) 51'; Pappa (yellow card) 61', (goal) 83'	Report	Goodson (yellow card) 23'; Dempsey 40'; Bradley (yellow card) 60'; Edu (yellow card) 66'; Johnson (yellow card) 82'	Stadium: Estadio Mateo Flores; Attendance: 18,000; Referee: Joel Aguilar (SLV)

August 15 Friendly	Mexico	0 – 1	United States	Mexico City, Mexico
19:00 UTC−05	Moreno (yellow card) 31'	Report	Edu (yellow card) 14'; Jones (yellow card) 69'; Orozco Fiscal 80'; Zusi (yellow card) 82'	Stadium: Estadio Azteca; Attendance: 56,000; Referee: Walter Quesada (CRC)

September 7 WCQ R3	Jamaica	2 – 1	United States	Kingston, Jamaica
20:30 UTC−05	Austin 23'; Shelton 62'; Watson (yellow card) 76'	Report	Dempsey 1'; Goodson (yellow card) 67'; Jones (yellow card) 78'	Stadium: Independence Park; Referee: Marco Rodriguez (MEX)

September 11 WCQ R3	United States	1 – 0	Jamaica	Columbus, Ohio
20:00 UTC−04	Gomez 55'; Zusi (yellow card) 62'	Report	Palmer (yellow card) 17'	Stadium: Columbus Crew Stadium; Attendance: 23,881; Referee: Jose Pineda (HON)

October 12 WCQ R3	Antigua and Barbuda	1 – 2	United States	North Sound, Antigua and Barbuda
19:00 UTC−04	Blackstock 25'; Thomas (yellow card) 61'	Report	Johnson 20', 90'; Jones (yellow card) 62'	Stadium: Sir Vivian Richards Stadium; Attendance: 7,000; Referee: Neal Brizan (TRI)

October 16 WCQ R3	United States	3 – 1	Guatemala	Kansas City, Kansas
18:00 UTC−06	Bocanegra 10'; Dempsey 18', 36', (yellow card) 90+2'	Report	Ruiz 5'; Vasquez (yellow card) 76'	Stadium: Livestrong Sporting Park; Attendance: 16,947; Referee: Roberto Moreno (PAN)

November 14 Friendly	Russia	2 – 2	United States	Krasnodar, Russia
19:00 UTC+04	Smolov 9'; Glushakov (yellow card) 51'; Kokorin (yellow card) 51'; Shirokov (yellow card) 77', (goal) 84' (pen.)	Report	Bradley (yellow card) 26', (goal) 76'; Goodson (yellow card) 84'; Diskerud 90+3'; Kljestan (yellow card) 90+4'	Stadium: Kuban Stadium; Attendance: 28,200; Referee: Nicola Rizzoli (ITA)

==== Under-23 ====
February 29 Friendly	United States	2 – 0	Mexico	Frisco, Texas
21:00 UTC−06	Agudelo 35'; Diskerud 36'	Report		Stadium: FC Dallas Stadium; Attendance: 7,432; Referee: Dave Gantar (CAN)

March 22 Olympic Qualifier	United States	6 – 0	Cuba	Nashville, Tennessee
20:00 UTC−06	Corona 11', 40', 88'; Agudelo 37'; Diz Pe 43' (o.g.); Adu 62'	Report		Stadium: LP Field; Attendance: 4,269; Referee: Roberto Garcia (MEX)

March 24 Olympic Qualifier	United States	0 – 2	Canada	Nashville, Tennessee
18:00 UTC−06		Report	Henry 58'; Cavallini 83'	Stadium: LP Field; Attendance: 10,578; Referee: Jafeth Perea (PAN)

March 26 Olympic Qualifier	United States	3 – 3	El Salvador	Nashville, Tennessee
20:00 UTC−06	Boyd 1', 65'; Corona 68'	Report	Blanco 35'; Flores 37'; Alas 90+4'	Stadium: LP Field; Attendance: 7,889; Referee: Roberto Garcia (MEX)

==== Under-20 ====
June 6 Friendly	Uruguay	4 – 2	United States	Montevideo, Uruguay
15:00 UTC−03	Cesar 9'; Mastriani 21'; Velazquez 35'; Cochran 56' (o.g.)	Report	Pineda 28'; Garcia 90+1'	Stadium: Estadio Gran Parque Central; Attendance: 600

June 8 Friendly	Uruguay	2 – 0	United States	Montevideo, Uruguay
15:00 UTC−03	Silva 39'; Cesar 61'	Report		Stadium: Estadio Viera; Attendance: 400

June 12 Friendly	Chile	2 – 1	United States	Santiago, Chile
19:00 UTC−03	Castillo 18', 60'	Report	Garcia 90+1' (pen.)	Stadium: Estadio Santa Laura-Universidad SEK; Attendance: 600

July 21 Milk Cup group stage	Denmark	1 – 0	United States	Limavady, Northern Ireland
17:00 UTC+01	Soren 33'	Report		Stadium: Scroggy Road; Attendance: 400

July 23 Milk Cup group stage	United States	1 – 0	Turkey	Ballymena, Northern Ireland
20:00 UTC+01	Pineda 73'	Report		Stadium: Showgrounds

July 26 Milk Cup 3PG	Chile	4 – 3	United States	Ballymena, Northern Ireland
13:00 UTC+01	Castillo 49', 70'; Henriquez 66', 68'	Report	Zimmerman 1'; Joya 65'; Pineda 82'	Stadium: Riada Stadium; Attendance: 200

October 10 2012 Marbella Cup	United States	1 – 2	Canada	Marbella, Spain
17:30 UTC+01	Rodriguez 75'	Report	Piette 33'; Clarke 80'	Stadium: Marbella Football Center; Attendance: 150

October 12 2012 Marbella Cup	United States	2 – 0	Scotland	Marbella, Spain
15:30 UTC+01	Villareal 22', 31'	Report		Stadium: Marbella Football Center; Attendance: 200

October 16 2012 Marbella Cup	United States	3 – 2	Azerbaijan	Marbella, Spain
17:00 UTC+01	Cuevas 9'; Rodriguez 54'; Joya 64'	Report	Asgandarov 20', 75'	Stadium: Marbella Football Center; Attendance: 200

==== Under-18 ====
May 23 Lisbon International Tournament	United States	1 – 1	Poland	Lisbon, Portugal
		Report

May 24 Lisbon International Tournament	United States	0 – 0	Slovakia	Lisbon, Portugal
14:30 UTC+00		Report		Attendance: 50

May 26 Lisbon International Tournament	Portugal	1 – 0	United States	Lisbon, Portugal
	Spencer 90+1' (o.g.)	Report		Attendance: 100; Referee: Krysztof Jakubik (POL)

May 24 Friendly	Netherlands	2 – 4	United States	Groesbeek, Netherlands
14:30 UTC+00	Karsdorp 8'; Becker 74'	Report	Spencer 34'; Lopez 40'; Gall 54'; Green 80'	Stadium: Sportpark de Heikant; Attendance: 500

November 21 Friendly	United States	3 – 1	Canada	Carson, California
15:00 UTC-07	Henkel 45'; Spencer 73'; Moreno 90'	Report	Dainkeh 68' (o.g.)	Stadium: U.S. Soccer National Training Center; Attendance: 300

November 23 Friendly	United States	2 – 2	Canada	Carson, California
15:00 UTC-07	Pfeffer 2'; Moreno 87'	Report	Sacramento 7'; Ait-Slimaine 82'	Stadium: U.S. Soccer National Training Center; Attendance: 400

==== Under-17 ====
April 3 Mondial Minimes Tournament Group B	United States	4 – 0	United Arab Emirates	Montaigu, France
18:15 UTC+01	Selemani 23'; Turner 50'; Wade 71'; Jamieson 90+4'	Report

April 5 Mondial Minimes Tournament Group B	United States	0 – 1	Portugal	Montaigu, France
18:15 UTC+01		Report

April 7 Mondial Minimes Tournament	United States	1 – 1 (a.e.t.) (4 – 3 p)	Japan	Montaigu, France
17:00 UTC+01		Report

April 9 Mondial Minimes Tournament 5th Place Match	United States	1 – 0	Mexico	Montaigu, France
10:30 UTC+01	Wade 59'	Report

June 24 Copa Saprissa	United States	1 – 1	Honduras	San José, Costa Rica
	Baird 28'	Report	Elis 18'

June 25 Copa Saprissa	Costa Rica	2 – 3	United States	San José, Costa Rica
	Salas 35'; Leal 62' (pen.)	Report	Rubin 18'; Requejo Jr. 32'; Muñoz 57'

June 27 Copa Saprissa	United States	0 – 3	Mexico	San José, Costa Rica
		Report	Diaz 19', 47'; Hernandez 41'

July 1 Copa Saprissa Final	United States	1 – 3	Mexico	San José, Costa Rica
	Rubin 43'	Report	Hernandez 23'; Diaz 24', 54'

September 29 AGS Cup	United States	2 – 1	Morocco	Villajoyosa, Spain
	Selemani 21'; Rubin 77'	Report	Ahmed 6'

September 30 AGS Cup	United States	2 – 0	United Arab Emirates	L'Alfàs del Pi, Spain
16:00 UTC+01	Akale 44' (pen.); Moore 60' (pen.)	Report

October 2 AGS Cup	United States	0 – 1	Azerbaijan	Benidorm, Spain
18:30 UTC+01		Report	Jafarvo 47'

October 4 AGS Cup	United States	2 – 1	Canada	Benidorm, Spain
18:30 UTC+01	Selemani 19'; Winn 38'	Report	Gordon 72'

October 6 AGS Cup	United States	1 – 1	Mexico	La Nucia, Spain
	Rubin 56'	Report	Liceaga 27'

October 21 Friendly	United States	3 – 1	Uruguay	Buenos Aires, Argentina
	Flores 16'; Donovan 68'; Rubin 77'	Report	Ospitaleche 33'	Stadium: Argentinos Juniors Youth Training Facility

October 23 Four Nations Tournament	United States	5 – 1	Chile	Santa Fe, Argentina
	Baird 3', 6'; Rubin 11'; Winn 37'; Akale 69'	Report	Oyarzo 80'	Stadium: Estadio de Club Colón

October 25 Four Nations Tournament	Argentina	3 – 1	United States	Santa Fe, Argentina
	Suarez 3'; Driussi 63'; Tripichio 71'	Report	Rubin 74'	Stadium: Estadio de Club Colón

October 27 Four Nations Tournament	United States	2 – 2	Paraguay	Santa Fe, Argentina
11:00 UTC-03	Wade 57'; Moore 69' (pen.)	Report	Colman 10'; Vargas 44'	Stadium: Estadio de Club Colón

November 18 Friendly	United States	2 – 1	Canada	Fort Lauderdale, Florida
	Winn 60'; Elney 87'	Report	Dominguez 6'	Stadium: Lockhart Stadium

November 28 Nike Friendlies	United States	4 – 4	Brazil	Lakewood Ranch, Florida
17:00 UTC-04	Rubin 29', 57'; Winn 43'; Selemani 81'	Report	Robert 21'; Boschilia 67', 79'; Murilo 84'	Stadium: Premier Sports Campus; Attendance: 300; Referee: Elie Aguilar (USA)

November 30 Nike Friendlies	United States	4 – 1	Turkey	Lakewood Ranch, Florida
17:00 UTC-04	Akale 24'; Moore 71' (pen.); Rubin 82'; Winn 85'	Report	Ünal 44'	Stadium: Premier Sports Campus; Attendance: 750; Referee: Cedric Adams (USA)

December 2 Nike Friendlies	United States	3 – 4	Portugal	Lakewood Ranch, Florida
17:00 UTC-04	Selemani 20'; Schropp 49'; Winn 62'	Report	Postiga 12', 40', 45+1'; Lima 84'	Stadium: Premier Sports Campus; Attendance: 4,500; Referee: Katja Koroleva (USA)

=== Women ===
==== Senior ====
Wins	Losses	Draws
28	1	3

January 20 OQT Group B	Dominican Republic	0 – 14	United States	Vancouver, British Columbia, Canada
19:30 UTC−08		Report	Wambach 1', 19'; Lloyd 5'; Buehler 7'; O'Reilly 17', 31', 78'; Heath 30'; Rodriguez 46', 48', 58', 69', 75'; Cheney 64'	Stadium: BC Place; Attendance: 6,321; Referee: Cardella Samuels (JAM)

January 22 OQT Group B	United States	13 – 0	Guatemala	Vancouver, British Columbia, Canada
16:30 UTC−08	Wambach 12', 14'; Cheney 24'; Rodriguez 29'; Lloyd 33'; Lindsey 34'; Leroux 48', 51', 57', 70', 87'; Rapinoe 75'; Morgan 83'	Report		Stadium: BC Place; Attendance: 6,259; Referee: Irazema Aguilera (CUB)

January 24 OQT Group B	United States	4 – 0	Mexico	Vancouver, British Columbia, Canada
19:30 UTC−08	Lloyd 7', 57', 86'; O'Reilly 8'	Report		Stadium: BC Place; Attendance: 7,599; Referee: Carol Anne Chenard (CAN)

January 27 OQT Semifinal	United States	3 – 0	Costa Rica	Vancouver, British Columbia, Canada
17:00 UTC−08	Heath 16'; Lloyd 72'; Morgan 89'	Report		Stadium: BC Place; Attendance: 10,000; Referee: Irazema Aguilera (CUB)

January 29 OQT Final	Canada	0 – 4	United States	Vancouver, British Columbia, Canada
17:00 UTC−08		Report	Morgan 4', 56'; Wambach 24', 28'	Stadium: BC Place; Attendance: 25,247; Referee: Quetzalli Alvarado (MEX)

February 11 Friendly	United States	2 – 1	New Zealand	Frisco, Texas
15:15 UTC−06	Morgan 88', 90+3'	Report	Wilkinson 49'	Stadium: FC Dallas Stadium; Attendance: 20,677; Referee: Moo Hackett (USA)

February 29 AC Group B	United States	5 – 0	Denmark	Lagos, Portugal
17:00 UTC+00	Morgan 21', 84'; Wambach 44'; Lloyd 76'; Leroux 90+3'	Report		Stadium: Estádio Municipal; Attendance: 300; Referee: Liang Qin (CHN)

March 2 AC Group B	Norway	1 – 2	United States	Lagos, Portugal
15:00 UTC+00	Thorsnes 90+3'	Report	Wambach 51'; Leroux 81'	Stadium: Estádio Municipal; Attendance: 300; Referee: Jessica Salom Di Lorio (ARG)

March 5 AC Group B	United States	0 – 1	Japan	Faro, Portugal
14:10 UTC+00		Report	Takase 84'	Stadium: Estádio Algarve; Attendance: 1,000; Referee: Pernill Larsson (SWE)

March 7 AC 3PM	United States	4 – 0	Sweden	Parchal, Portugal
14:00 UTC+00	Morgan 4', 33', 71'; Wambach 37'	Report		Stadium: Estádio Municipal; Attendance: 400; Referee: Morag Pirie (SCO)

April 1 Kirin Challenge Cup	Japan	1 – 1	United States	Sendai, Japan
19:30 UTC+09	Kinga 31'	Report	Morgan 72'	Stadium: Yurtec Stadium Sendai; Attendance: 15,159; Referee: Juan Li (CHN)

April 3 Kirin Challenge Cup	United States	3 – 0	Brazil	Chiba, Japan
16:00 UTC+09	Lloyd 18'; Boxx 23'; Rodriguez 83'	Report		Stadium: Fukuda Denshi Arena; Attendance: 500; Referee: Sachiko Yamagishi (JPN)

May 27 Friendly	United States	4 – 1	China	Chester, Pennsylvania
19:00 UTC−06	Morgan 34', 50'; Zhou Gaoping 36' (o.g.); Wambach 83'	Report	Zhang Rui 23'	Stadium: PPL Park; Attendance: Margaret Domka (USA); Referee: 18,573

June 16 Sweden Invitational	Sweden	1 – 3	United States	Halmstad, Sweden
10:00 UTC-04	Schelin 35'	Report	Wambach 8'; Morgan 22'; Heath 56'	Stadium: Örjans Vall; Attendance: 2,751; Referee: Teodora Albon (ROU)

June 18 Sweden Invitational	United States	4 – 1	Japan	Halmstad, Sweden
07:00 UTC-04	Morgan 3', 61'; Wambach 10', 90+2'	Report	Nagasato 28'	Stadium: Örjans Vall; Attendance: 1,309; Referee: Linn Andersson (SWE)

June 30 Friendly	United States	2 – 1	Canada	Sandy, Utah
12:00 UTC−06	Moscato 15' (o.g.); Rodriguez 85'	Report	Tancredi 57'	Stadium: Rio Tinto Stadium; Attendance: 16,805; Referee: Kari Seitz (USA)

July 25 Olympics Group G	United States	4 – 2	France	Glasgow, Scotland
17:00 UTC+00	Wambach 19'; Morgan 32', 66'; Lloyd 56'	Report	Thiney 12'; Delie 14'	Stadium: Hampden Park; Attendance: 18,090; Referee: Sachiko Yamagishi (JPN)

July 28 Olympics Group G	United States	3 – 0	Colombia	Glasgow, Scotland
17:00 UTC+00	Rapinoe 33'; Wambach 74'; Lloyd 77'	Report		Stadium: Hampden Park; Attendance: 11,313; Referee: Thalia Mitsi (GRE)

July 31 Olympics Group G	United States	1 – 0	North Korea	Manchester, England
17:15 UTC+00	Wambach 25'	Report		Stadium: Old Trafford; Attendance: 29,522; Referee: Jenny Palmqvist (SWE)

August 3 Olympics QF	United States	2 – 0	New Zealand	Newcastle upon Tyne, England
14:30 UTC+00	Wambach 27'; Leroux 87'	Report		Stadium: St James' Park; Attendance: 10,441; Referee: Salomé di Iorio (ARG)

August 6 Olympics SF	Canada	3 – 4 (a.e.t.)	United States	Manchester, England
17:45 UTC+00	Sinclair 22', 67', 73'	Report	Rapinoe 54', 70'; Wambach 80' (pen.); Morgan 120+3'	Stadium: Old Trafford; Attendance: 26,640; Referee: Christina Pedersen (NOR)

August 9 Olympics F	United States	2 – 1	Japan	London, England
17:45 UTC+00	Lloyd 8', 54'	Report	Ogimi 63'	Stadium: Wembley Stadium; Attendance: 80,203; Referee: Bibiana Steinhaus (GER)

September 1 Friendly	United States	8 – 0	Costa Rica	Rochester, New York
14:30 UTC−05	Rapinoe 14', 44'; Wambach 24', 31'; Morgan 38'; Leroux 78'; Lloyd 83'; O'Reilly 88'	Report		Stadium: Sahlen's Stadium; Attendance: 13,208; Referee: Christina Ibanez (USA)

September 16 Friendly	United States	2 – 1	Australia	Carson, California
12:30 UTC−08	Morgan 55'; Boxx 63' (pen.)	Report	De Vanna 34'	Stadium: The Home Depot Center; Attendance: 19,851; Referee: Kari Seitz (USA)

September 19 Friendly	United States	6 – 2	Australia	Commerce City, Colorado
20:00 UTC−07	O'Reilly 25'; Morgan 43', 63'; Wambach 53'; Boxx 69'; Leroux 82'	Report	De Vanna 32'; Walsh 34'	Stadium: Dick's Sporting Goods Park; Attendance: 18,589; Referee: Kristin Schiereck

October 20 Friendly	United States	1 – 1	Germany	Bridgeview, Illinois
19:00 UTC−05	Wambach 2'	Report	Mittag 14'	Stadium: Toyota Park; Attendance: 19,522; Referee: Margaret Domka (USA)

October 23 Friendly	United States	2 – 2	Germany	East Hartford, Connecticut
19:30 UTC−04	Wambach 44'; Heath 67'	Report	Marozsán 48', 85'	Stadium: Rentschler Field; Attendance: 18,870; Referee: Carol Anne Chenard (CAN)

November 28 Friendly	United States	5 – 0	Republic of Ireland	Portland, Oregon
19:00 UTC−07	Morgan 24', 34', 44'; Leroux 62', 81'	Report		Stadium: Jeld-Wen Field; Attendance: 10,092; Referee: Katja Koroleva (USA)

December 1 Friendly	United States	2 – 0	Republic of Ireland	Glendale, Arizona
19:30 UTC−06	Morgan 1'; Rapinoe 38'	Report		Stadium: University of Phoenix Stadium; Attendance: 11,570; Referee: Kristen Schiereck (USA)

December 8 Friendly	United States	2 – 0	China	Detroit, Michigan
13:30 UTC−04	Lloyd 51'; Leroux 85'	Report		Stadium: Ford Field; Attendance: 17,371; Referee: Margaret Domka (USA)

December 12 Friendly	United States	4 – 0	China	Houston, Texas
19:30 UTC−05	Wambach 20', 63'; Lloyd 62'; Rodriguez 85'	Report		Stadium: BBVA Compass Stadium; Attendance: 15,643; Referee: Kristen Schiereck (USA)

December 15 Friendly	United States	4 – 1	China	Boca Raton, Florida
	Wambach 18', 64'; Rapinoe 36'; Leroux 87'	Report	Peng 45'	Stadium: FAU Stadium; Attendance: 10,493; Referee: Christina Ibanez (USA)

==== Under-23 ====
February 26 Four Nations Tournament	United States	2 – 0	Sweden	La Manga, Spain
	Brooks 24'; Bywaters 58'	Report

February 28 Four Nations Tournament	United States	1 – 2	England	La Manga, Spain
	Ochs 59'	Report	Duggen 10'; Bonner 54'

March 1 Four Nations Tournament	United States	5 – 0	Norway	La Manga, Spain
	Farrelly 13', 41'; Brooks 31'; Marlborough 62'; Lytle 76'	Report

June 15 Three Nations Tournament	United States	1 – 1	Sweden	Stjørdalen, Norway
18:00 UTC+02	Pressley 44'	Report	Konradsson 31'	Stadium: Overlands Minde

June 17 Three Nations Tournament	Norway	1 – 4	United States	Stjørdalen, Norway
18:00 UTC+02	Line Holter 23'	Report	Hagen 19'; DaCosta 31'; Marlborough 33'; Ochs 87'	Stadium: Overlands Minde

June 19 Friendly	Norway	4 – 2	United States	Stjørdalen, Norway
	Haugstol 3'; Hegerberg 6', 15'; Holter 11'	report	Brooks 35'; Verloo 37'	Stadium: Overlands Minde

==== Under-20 ====
February 9 Four Nations Tournament	United States	10 – 0	Switzerland	La Manga, Spain
	Johnston 6'; Ohai 6', 76'; Horan 6', 57', 60'; Brian 43'; Mewis 50', 54'; Ubogagu 81'	Report		Stadium: La Manga Club Field G

February 11 Four Nations Tournament	United States	1 – 0	Germany	La Manga, Spain
	Horan 81'	Report		Stadium: La Manga Club Field G

February 13 Four Nations Tournament	United States	2 – 0	Norway	La Manga, Spain

March 2 CONCACAF Championship Group B	United States	6 – 0	Guatemala	Panama City, Panama
17:00 UTC−05	Horan 12', 46', 74'; Johnston 29'; Stengel 54'; Roccaro 60'	Report		Stadium: Estadio Rommel Fernández; Attendance: 985; Referee: Gillian Martindale (BRB)

March 4 CONCACAF Championship Group B	United States	6 – 0	Cuba	Panama City, Panama
17:00 UTC−05	Stengel 5', 37'; Hayes 25', 29'; DiBernado 53'; Ubogagu 84'	Report		Stadium: Estadio Rommel Fernández; Referee: Alondra Arellano (MEX)

March 6 CONCACAF Championship Group B	Panama	0 – 6	United States	Panama City, Panama
19:30 UTC−05		Report	Capelle 28'; DiBernado 45'; Johnston 53'; Hayes 59', 78'; Mewis 69'	Stadium: Estadio Rommel Fernández; Referee: Alondra Arellano (MEX)

March 9 CONCACAF Championship Semifinals	United States	4 – 0	Mexico	Panama City, Panama
17:00 UTC−05	Johnston 12'; Brian 36'; Horan 38'; Ohai 81'	Report		Stadium: Estadio Rommel Fernández; Attendance: 2,071; Referee: Gillian Martindale (BRB)

March 11 CONCACAF Championship Final	United States	2 – 1	Canada	Panama City, Panama
21:00 UTC−05	Hayes 79'; Ubogagu 89'	Report	Richardson 5'	Stadium: Estadio Rommel Fernández

April 12 Friendly	United States	4 – 1	China	Carson, California
15:00 UTC−08	Horan 46', 51'; Ubogagu 88'; Mewis 90+2'	Report	Liu S. 84' (pen.)	Stadium: The Home Depot Center; Referee: Daniel Radford (USA)

April 15 Friendly	United States	3 – 0	China	Carson, California
15:00 UTC−08	Stengel 10'; Ubogagu 50'; Mewis 90+1'	Report		Stadium: The Home Depot Center; Referee: Felisha Mariscal (USA)

May 19 Friendly	United States	5 – 0	New Zealand	Carson, California
15:00 UTC−08	Horan 14'; Ohai 18'; Stengel 35', 47'; Ubogagu 86'	Report		Stadium: The Home Depot Center

June 17 Friendly	Japan	1 – 0	United States	Osaka, Japan
	Tanaka 81'	Report		Stadium: Nagai Stadium

June 20 Friendly	Japan	0 – 2	United States	Osaka, Japan
		Report	Hayes 41'; Ubogagu 71'	Stadium: J-Green Sakai National Training Center

August 20 U-20 World Cup Group D	Ghana	0 – 4	United States	Hiroshima, Japan
16:00 UTC+09		Report	Addai 20' (o.g.); Hayes 50', 74', 90+2'	Stadium: Hiroshima Big Arch; Attendance: 2,582; Referee: Teodora Albon (ROU)

August 23 U-20 World Cup Group D	United States	1 – 1	China	Hiroshima, Japan
19:00 UTC+09	Hayes 36'	Report	Shen Lili 19'	Stadium: Hiroshima Big Arch; Attendance: 3,559; Referee: Pernilla Larsson (SWE)

August 27 U-20 World Cup Group D	United States	0 – 3	Germany	Rifu, Japan
16:00 UTC+09		Report	Lotzen 35', 53'; Leopolz 55'	Stadium: Miyagi Stadium; Referee: Abirami Apbai (SIN)

August 31 U-20 World Cup QF	North Korea	1 – 2 (a.e.t.)	United States	Saitama, Japan
19:30 UTC+09	Kim Su-Gyong 75'	Report	DiBernardo 52'; Ubogagu 98'	Stadium: Urawa Komaba Stadium; Attendance: 6,284; Referee: Silvia Spinelli (ITA)

September 4 U-20 World Cup SF	Nigeria	0 – 2	United States	Tokyo, Japan
16:00 UTC+09		Report	Brian 22'; Ohai 70'	Stadium: National Olympic Stadium; Attendance: 28,306; Referee: Esther Staubli (SUI)

September 8 U-20 World Cup F	United States	1 – 0	Germany	Tokyo, Japan
19:20 UTC+09	Ohai 44'	Report		Stadium: National Olympic Stadium; Attendance: 31,114; Referee: Pernilla Larsson (SWE)

==== Under-17 ====
February 6 Friendly	United States	2 – 0	Germany	Sunrise, Florida
15:30 UTC−05	Sullivan 53'; Bruder 69'	Report		Stadium: KICS International

February 6 Friendly	United States	1 – 0	Germany	Sunrise, Florida
15:30 UTC−05	Green 36'	Report		Stadium: KICS International

March 4 Ten Nations Tournament	United States	2 – 0	France	La Manga, Spain
	Own Goal 48' (o.g.); Sullivan 67'	Report		Stadium: La Manga Club

March 6 Ten Nations Tournament	United States	1 – 1	England	La Manga, Spain
	Andrews 44'		England 29'	Stadium: La Manga Club

March 8 Ten Nations Tournament	United States	2 – 0	Netherlands	La Manga, Spain
	Munerlyn 18'; Own Goal 46' (o.g.)	Report		Stadium: La Manga Club

April 9 Friendly	United States	0 – 0	China	Chula Vista, California
15:30 UTC−05		Report		Stadium: Olympic Training Center

May 3 CONCACAF Championship Group B	Bahamas	0 – 10	United States	Guatemala City, Guatemala
14:00 UTC−06		Report	Purce 1', 75', 84'; Green 6', 39', 40', 44', 60'; Sullivan 55'; Payne 77'	Stadium: Estadio Cementos Progreso; Attendance: 200; Referee: Cardella Samuels (JAM)

May 5 CONCACAF Championship Group B	United States	5 – 0	Trinidad and Tobago	Guatemala City, Guatemala
14:00 UTC−06	Bruder 20'; Sullivan 65'; Robinson 67'; Green 86'; Boyles 90+3'	Report		Stadium: Estadio Cementos Progreso; Attendance: 200; Referee: Alicia Villatoro (GUA)

May 7 CONCACAF Championship Group B	United States	3 – 0	Mexico	Guatemala City, Guatemala
16:30 UTC−06	Green 17' (pen.), 31', 36'	Report		Stadium: Estadio Cementos Progreso; Referee: Michelle Pye (CAN)

May 10 CONCACAF Championship SF	United States	7 – 0	Panama	Guatemala City, Guatemala
13:30 UTC−06	Payne 9'; Green 44', 45+1', 54'; Andrews 50'; Jenkins 66'; Bruder 77'	Report		Stadium: Estadio Cementos Progreso; Attendance: 100; Referee: Gillian Martindale (BRB)

May 12 CONCACAF Championship F	United States	1 – 0	Canada	Guatemala City, Guatemala
16:30 UTC−06	Munerlyn 21'	Report		Stadium: Estadio Cementos Progreso; Attendance: 2,000; Referee: Alicia Villatoro (GUA)

July 29 Friendly	Slovenia	1 – 2	United States	Slovenska Bistrica, Slovenia
	Jerina 84'	Report	Basinger 62'; Payne 90'

August 22 Friendly	United States	2 – 1	China	Carson, California
15:00 UTC−08	Payne 58'; Green 81'	Report	Zhang Chen 43'	Stadium: The Home Depot Center

August 25 Friendly	United States	5 – 1	China	Carson, California
15:00 UTC−08	Jenkins 2', 75'; Payne 8', 27'; Green 82'	Report	Zhang Chen 81'	Stadium: The Home Depot Center

September 22 U-17 World Cup Group B	France	0 – 0	United States	Lankaran, Azerbaijan
13:00 UTC+05		Report		Stadium: Lankaran City Stadium; Attendance: 8,100; Referee: Claudia Umpierrez (URU)

September 25 U-17 World Cup Group B	United States	6 – 0	Gambia	Baku, Azerbaijan
17:00 UTC+05	Green 25' (pen.), 61', 71'; Munerlyn 46'; Stanton 83'; Payne 86'	Report		Stadium: Dalga Arena; Attendance: 4,200; Referee: Etsuko Fukano (JPN)

September 29 U-17 World Cup Group B	United States	1 – 1	North Korea	Baku, Azerbaijan
17:00 UTC+05	Jenkins 2'	Report	Ri Un Sim 4'	Stadium: Bayil Stadium; Attendance: 2,500; Referee: Katalin Kulcsar (HUN)

== Managerial changes ==
Team	Outgoing	Manner	Date	Table	Incoming	Date	Table
Colorado Rapids	Gary Smith	Fired	November 7, 2011	5th (Western Conference)	Óscar Pareja	January 5, 2012	Off-season
Philadelphia Union	Peter Nowak	Resigned	June 13, 2012	9th (Eastern Conference)	John Hackworth	June 13, 2012	9th (Eastern Conference)
Portland Timbers	John Spencer	Fired	July 9, 2012	8th (Western Conference)	Gavin Wilkinson	July 9, 2012	8th (Western Conference)
C.D. Chivas USA	Robin Fraser	Fired	November 9, 2012	9th (Western Conference)	José Luis Sánchez Solá	December 8, 2012	Off-season
New York Red Bulls	Hans Backe	End of Contract	November 9, 2012	3rd (Eastern Conference)	Mike Petke	November 9, 2012	Off-season

== League tables ==
=== Major League Soccer (Div. 1) ===
Eastern Conference

Pos	Team	Pld	W	L	T	GF	GA	GD	Pts	Qualification
1	Sporting Kansas City	34	18	7	9	42	27	+15	63	Qualification for the conference semifinals
2	D.C. United	34	17	10	7	53	43	+10	58	Qualification for the conference semifinals
3	New York Red Bulls	34	16	9	9	57	46	+11	57	Qualification for the conference semifinals
4	Chicago Fire	34	17	11	6	46	41	+5	57	Qualification for the knockout round
5	Houston Dynamo	34	14	9	11	48	41	+7	53	Qualification for the knockout round
6	Columbus Crew	34	15	12	7	44	44	0	52	
7	Montreal Impact	34	12	16	6	45	51	−6	42	
8	Philadelphia Union	34	10	18	6	37	45	−8	36	
9	New England Revolution	34	9	17	8	39	44	−5	35	
10	Toronto FC	34	5	21	8	36	62	−26	23	

Source: MLS

Western Conference

Pos	Team	Pld	W	L	T	GF	GA	GD	Pts	Qualification
1	San Jose Earthquakes	34	19	6	9	72	43	+29	66	Qualification for the conference semifinals
2	Real Salt Lake	34	17	11	6	46	35	+11	57	Qualification for the conference semifinals
3	Seattle Sounders FC	34	15	8	11	51	33	+18	56	Qualification for the conference semifinals
4	LA Galaxy	34	16	12	6	59	47	+12	54	Qualification for the knockout round
5	Vancouver Whitecaps FC	34	11	13	10	35	41	−6	43	Qualification for the knockout round
6	FC Dallas	34	9	13	12	42	47	−5	39	
7	Colorado Rapids	34	11	19	4	44	50	−6	37	
8	Portland Timbers	34	8	16	10	34	56	−22	34	
9	Chivas USA	34	7	18	9	24	58	−34	30	

Source: MLS

Overall

Pos	Team	Pld	W	L	T	GF	GA	GD	Pts	
1	San Jose Earthquakes (S)	34	19	6	9	72	43	+29	66	Qualification for the CONCACAF Champions League
2	Sporting Kansas City (U)	34	18	7	9	42	27	+15	63	Qualification for the CONCACAF Champions League
3	D.C. United	34	17	10	7	53	43	+10	58	
4	New York Red Bulls	34	16	9	9	57	46	+11	57	
5	Real Salt Lake	34	17	11	6	46	35	+11	57	
6	Chicago Fire	34	17	11	6	46	41	+5	57	
7	Seattle Sounders FC	34	15	8	11	51	33	+18	56	
8	LA Galaxy (C)	34	16	12	6	59	47	+12	54	Qualification for the CONCACAF Champions League
9	Houston Dynamo	34	14	9	11	48	41	+7	53	Qualification for the CONCACAF Champions League
10	Columbus Crew	34	15	12	7	44	44	0	52	
11	Vancouver Whitecaps FC	34	11	13	10	35	41	−6	43	
12	Montreal Impact	34	12	16	6	45	51	−6	42	Qualification for the CONCACAF Champions League
13	FC Dallas	34	9	13	12	42	47	−5	39	
14	Colorado Rapids	34	11	19	4	44	50	−6	37	
15	Philadelphia Union	34	10	18	6	37	45	−8	36	
16	New England Revolution	34	9	17	8	39	44	−5	35	
17	Portland Timbers	34	8	16	10	34	56	−22	34	
18	Chivas USA	34	7	18	9	24	58	−34	30	
19	Toronto FC (V)	34	5	21	8	36	62	−26	23	

Source: MLS
Rules for classification: 1) points; 2) head-to-head record; 3) goal difference; 4) number of goals scored
(C) MLS Cup champions; (S) Supporters' Shield winners; (U) U.S. Open Cup winners; (V) Canadian Championship winners

=== North American Soccer League (Div. 2) ===
Pos	Team	Pld	W	D	L	GF	GA	GD	Pts	Qualification
1	San Antonio Scorpions (X)	28	13	8	7	46	27	+19	47	Playoff semifinals
2	Tampa Bay Rowdies (C)	28	12	9	7	37	30	+7	45	Playoff semifinals
3	Puerto Rico Islanders	28	11	8	9	32	30	+2	41	Playoff quarterfinals
4	Carolina RailHawks	28	10	10	8	44	46	−2	40	Playoff quarterfinals
5	Fort Lauderdale Strikers	28	9	9	10	40	46	−6	36	Playoff quarterfinals
6	Minnesota United	28	8	11	9	34	33	+1	35	Playoff quarterfinals
7	Atlanta Silverbacks	28	7	9	12	35	46	−11	30	
8	FC Edmonton	28	5	10	13	26	36	−10	25	

Source: NASL Standings
Rules for classification: 1) points; 2) goal difference; 3) number of goals scored.
(C) Champions; (X) Commissioner's Cup (regular season champion)

=== USL Pro (Div. 3) ===
Pos	Team	Pld	W	T	L	GF	GA	GD	Pts	Qualification
1	Orlando City SC (C)	24	17	6	1	50	18	+32	57	Commissioner's Cup, Playoffs 1st round bye
2	Rochester Rhinos (A)	24	12	5	7	27	23	+4	41	Playoffs 1st round bye
3	Charleston Battery (A)	24	12	2	10	36	26	+10	38	Playoffs
4	Richmond Kickers (A)	24	11	5	8	31	27	+4	38	Playoffs
5	Wilmington Hammerheads (A)	24	10	7	7	34	32	+2	37	Playoffs
6	Harrisburg City Islanders (A)	24	10	7	7	34	29	+5	37	Playoffs
7	Charlotte Eagles	24	11	3	10	34	26	+8	36	
8	Los Angeles Blues	24	9	3	12	26	29	−3	30	
9	Dayton Dutch Lions	24	4	10	10	20	29	−9	22	
10	Pittsburgh Riverhounds	24	4	5	15	20	39	−19	17	
11	Antigua Barracuda	24	5	1	18	16	50	−34	16	

Source: USL Pro official standings
Rules for classification: Points, then tiebreak: 1) Head-to-head record based on total points in League games, 2) Total wins in League games, 3) Goal difference in League games, 4) Goals scored in League games, etc.
(A) Advances to USL Pro Playoffs; (C) Commissioner's Cup (best regular season record)

=== Women's Premier Soccer League Elite ===
Pos	Team	Pld	W	D	L	GF	GA	GD	Pts	Qualification or relegation
1	Boston Breakers	14	11	0	3	28	9	+19	30 (Note: The Boston Breakers forfeited the May 26 match against the Western New York Flash for fielding an ineligible player. The Boston Breakers won the match 3–2. The WPSL credited the Western New York Flash with a 1–0 victory with all previous goals of the match being nullified. Before the June 18 ruling, Breakers forward Katie Schoepfer led the league in scoring with 8 goals. However, her 3 goals at the May 26 match were all forfeited, as were goals by Flash players Adriana and Angela Salem.)	2012 WPSL Elite playoffs
2	Western New York Flash (C)	14	9	3	2	29	8	+21	30	2012 WPSL Elite playoffs
3	New York Fury	14	9	2	3	25	8	+17	29	2012 WPSL Elite playoffs
4	Chicago Red Stars	14	9	1	4	26	11	+15	28	2012 WPSL Elite playoffs
5	New England Mutiny	14	6	3	5	25	34	−9	21	
6	ASA Chesapeake Charge	14	2	3	9	15	35	−20	9	
7	Philadelphia Fever	14	1	2	11	8	26	−18	5	
8	FC Indiana	14	1	2	11	8	33	−25	5	

Source: WPSL Elite 2012 Standings
Rules for classification: 1) points; 2) goal difference; 3) number of goals scored
(C) Champions

== U.S. Open Cup ==
The 99th edition of the annual national championship, the 2012 Lamar Hunt U.S. Open Cup, ran from May 15 through August 8. Sporting Kansas City defeated Seattle Sounders FC on penalty kicks 3-2 for the championship. The winner qualified for the 2013–14 CONCACAF Champions League Group stage.

=== Changes for 2012 ===
In 2012, U.S. Soccer announced that the field would expand from 40 clubs to 64 clubs, that all MLS teams would receive an automatic berth, and that all 2nd and 3rd tier professional leagues would also receive an automatic berth.

The tournament is a single game, single elimination tournament with random drawings deciding the home team (provided the home team stadium meets USSF standards) for the first round through the quarterfinals. The home team for the semi-finals and finals will be determined through competitive bidding as has been done in prior years.

=== Tournament format ===
Teams from the Premier Development League (16 berths), the United States Adult Soccer Association (9 berths), the National Premier Soccer League (6 berths), and US Club Soccer (1 berth) will enter the tournament in the first round. The winners will advance to the 2nd round where they will meet tier 3, USL Pro (10 berths) and tier 2 North American Soccer League professional teams. The second round winners will in turn meet the 16 MLS clubs in the third round. In the remaining rounds of the tournament, winners will advance in each round until the two teams meet in the finals on August 6 or 7th.

Qualification for the lower tiers of the soccer pyramid was mostly completed by April 29 and the pairings for the first two rounds were released on May 1.

== Honors ==
=== Professional ===
Men
Competition		Winner
U.S. Open Cup		Sporting Kansas City
Major League Soccer	MLS Supporters' Shield	San Jose Earthquakes
Major League Soccer	MLS Cup	Los Angeles Galaxy
NASL	Regular season	San Antonio Scorpions
NASL	Playoffs	Tampa Bay Rowdies
USL Pro	Regular season	Orlando City
USL Pro	Playoffs	Charleston Battery

Women
Competition	Winner
WPSL Elite	Western New York Flash
W-League	Ottawa Fury Women
Women's Premier Soccer League	Gulf Coast Texans

=== Amateur ===
Men
Competition	Team
USL Premier Development League	Forest City London
National Premier Soccer League	FC Sonic Lehigh Valley
NCAA Division I Soccer Championship	Indiana
NCAA Division II Soccer Championship	Lynn University
NCAA Division III Soccer Championship	Messiah College
NAIA Soccer Championship	Belhaven (MS)

Women
Competition	Team
NCAA Division I Soccer Championship	North Carolina
NCAA Division II Soccer Championship	West Florida
NCAA Division III Soccer Championship	Messiah College
NAIA Soccer Championship	Lindsey Wilson (KY)

== American clubs in international competition ==
Club	Competition	Final round
Los Angeles Galaxy	2011–12 CONCACAF Champions League	Quarterfinals
Seattle Sounders FC	2011–12 CONCACAF Champions League	Quarterfinals
Houston Dynamo	2012–13 CONCACAF Champions League	Quarterfinals
Los Angeles Galaxy	2012–13 CONCACAF Champions League	Semifinals
Real Salt Lake	2012–13 CONCACAF Champions League	Group stage
Seattle Sounders FC	2012–13 CONCACAF Champions League	Semifinals

=== 2011-12 Champions League ===
==== Los Angeles Galaxy ====
March 7, 2012 Quarterfinals	Toronto FC (Canada)	2 – 2	(United States) Los Angeles Galaxy	Toronto, Ontario, Canada
20:00 UTC−05	Johnson 12'; Silva 17'	Report	Magee 29'; Donovan 88'	Stadium: Rogers Centre; Attendance: 47,658; Referee: Courtney Campbell (JAM)

March 14, 2012 Quarterfinals	Los Angeles Galaxy (United States)	1 – 2 (3 – 4 agg.)	(Canada) Toronto FC	Carson, United States
19:00 UTC−08	Harden 55' (o.g.)	Report	Johnson 34'; Soolsma 67'	Stadium: The Home Depot Center; Attendance: 7,500; Referee: Roberto Moreno (PAN)

==== Seattle Sounders ====
March 7, 2012 Quarterfinals	Seattle Sounders FC (United States)	2 – 1	(Mexico) Santos Laguna	Seattle, United States
19:00 UTC−08	Estrada 12'; Evans 63'	Report	Gomez 61'	Stadium: CenturyLink Field; Attendance: 23,433; Referee: Walter Quesada (CRC)

March 14, 2012 Quarterfinals	Santos Laguna (Mexico)	6 – 1 (7 – 3 agg.)	(United States) Seattle Sounders FC	Torreón, Mexico
19:00 UTC−06	Suárez 8', 76'; Peralta 10'; Gomez 49', 68'; Ochoa 81'	Report	Fernández 37'	Stadium: Estadio Corona; Referee: Joel Aguilar (SLV)

=== 2012-13 Champions League ===
==== Houston Dynamo ====
August 22, 2012 Group 3	FAS (El Salvador)	1 – 3	(United States) Houston Dynamo	San Salvador, El Salvador
22:00 UTC−04	Águila 64'	Report	Ching 12'; Weaver 19'; Watson 60'	Stadium: Estadio Cuscatlán; Attendance: 2,510; Referee: Marcos Brea (CUB)

August 30, 2012 Group 3	Olimpia (Honduras)	1 – 1	(United States) Houston Dynamo	San Pedro Sula, Honduras
22:00 UTC−04	Caetano 7'	Report	Moffat 57'	Stadium: Estadio Francisco Morazán; Referee: Marco Rodríguez (Mexico)

September 20, 2012 Group 3	Houston Dynamo (United States)	4 – 0	(El Salvador) FAS	Houston, Texas
20:00 UTC−04	Barnes 21'; Boswell 44'; Weaver 49'; Carr 78'	Report		Stadium: BBVA Compass Stadium; Referee: Francisco Chacón (MEX)

October 23, 2012 Group 3	Houston Dynamo (United States)	1 – 1	(Honduras) Olimpia	Houston, Texas
20:00 UTC−04	Hainault 65'	Report	Caetano 21'	Stadium: BBVA Compass Stadium; Attendance: 19,462; Referee: Juan Carlos Guerra (GUA)

==== Los Angeles Galaxy ====
August 23, 2012 Group 5	Los Angeles Galaxy (United States)	5 – 2	(El Salvador) Isidro Metapán	Carson, California
22:00 UTC−04	Alvarado 20' (o.g.); Keane 22'; Beckham 45+1'; Juninho 82', 90+3'	Report	Muñoz 17', 87' (pen.)	Stadium: The Home Depot Center; Attendance: 10,574; Referee: Jose Peñaloza Soto (MEX)

August 29, 2012 Group 5	Los Angeles Galaxy (United States)	4 – 0	Puerto Rico Islanders	Carson, California
22:00 UTC−04	Meyer 7'; Villarreal 46'; McBean 80'; Stephens 82'	Report		Stadium: The Home Depot Center; Attendance: 7,500; Referee: Jafeth Perea (PAN)

September 19, 2012 Group 5	Puerto Rico Islanders	0 – 0	(United States) Los Angeles Galaxy	Bayamón, Puerto Rico
20:00 UTC−04		Report		Stadium: Juan Ramón Loubriel Stadium; Attendance: 2,905; Referee: Raymond Bogle (JAM)

October 25, 2012 Group 5	Isidro Metapán (El Salvador)	2 – 3	(United States) Los Angeles Galaxy	Metapán, El Salvador
22:00 UTC−04	Suárez 55'; Muñoz 67'	Report	McBean 38', 62'; Stephens 79'	Stadium: Estadio Jorge Calero Suárez; Attendance: 1,318; Referee: Hugo Cruz (CRC)

==== Real Salt Lake ====
July 31, 2012 Group 2	Herediano (Costa Rica)	1 – 0	(United States) Real Salt Lake	San José, Costa Rica
22:00 UTC−04	Aguilar 14'	Report		Stadium: Estadio Nacional de Costa Rica; Attendance: 2,677; Referee: Francisco Chacón (MEX)

August 21, 2012 Group 2	Real Salt Lake (United States)	2 – 0	(Panama) Tauro	Sandy, Utah
22:00 UTC−04	Saborío 48'; Beckerman 58'	Report		Stadium: Rio Tinto Stadium; Attendance: 20,430; Referee: Oscar Reyna (GUA)

September 18, 2012 Group 2	Tauro (Panama)	0 – 1	(United States) Real Salt Lake	Panama City, Panama
20:00 UTC−04		Report	Saborío 90+4' (pen.)	Stadium: Estadio Rommel Fernández; Attendance: 674; Referee: Mauricio Morales (MEX)

October 23, 2012 Group 2	Real Salt Lake (United States)	0 – 0	(Costa Rica) Herediano	Sandy, Utah
22:00 UTC−04		Report		Stadium: Rio Tinto Stadium; Attendance: 20,436; Referee: Elmer Bonilla (SLV)

==== Seattle Sounders ====
August 2, 2012 Group 4	Seattle Sounders FC (United States)	3 – 1	(Trinidad and Tobago) Caledonia AIA	Seattle, Washington
22:00 UTC−04	Ochoa 19'; Montero 30'; Rose 43'	Report	Joseph 50' (pen.)	Stadium: CenturyLink Field; Attendance: 7,767; Referee: Stanley Lancaster (GUY)

August 30, 2012 Group 4	Caledonia AIA (Trinidad and Tobago)	1 – 3	(United States) Seattle Sounders FC	Malabar, Trinidad and Tobago
20:00 UTC−04	Joseph 67' (pen.)	Report	Caskey 45'; Ochoa 60'; Montero 69'	Stadium: Larry Gomes Stadium; Referee: Stanley Lancaster (GUY)

September 19, 2012 Group 4	Marathón (Honduras)	2 – 3	(United States) Seattle Sounders FC	San Pedro Sula, Honduras
22:00 UTC−04	Berríos 35' (pen.), 68' (pen.)	Report	Ochoa 11'; Johnson 62'; Evans 78'	Stadium: Estadio Yankel Rosenthal; Attendance: 968; Referee: Marlon Mejía (SLV)

October 24, 2012 Group 4	Seattle Sounders FC (United States)	3 – 1	(Honduras) Marathón	Seattle, Washington
22:00 UTC−04	Ochoa 23'; Zakuani 27'; Estrada 76'	Report	Brown 37'	Stadium: CenturyLink Field; Attendance: 7,874
