= Athletics at the 1984 Summer Olympics – Men's 110 metres hurdles =

Men's 110 metres hurdles at the Games of the XXIII Olympiad
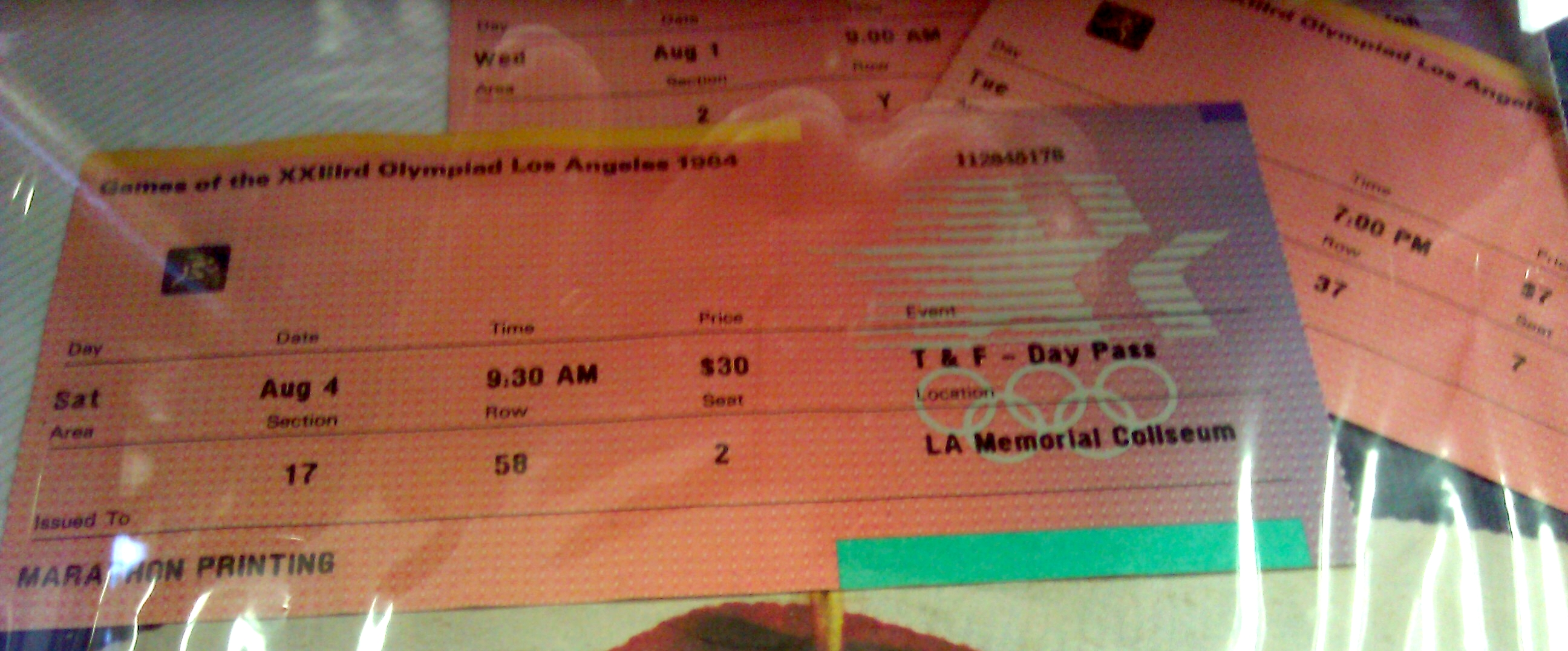
- Tickets for Athletics at the 1984 Summer Olympics
- Venue: Los Angeles Memorial Coliseum
- Dates: August 5 (heats and quarterfinals); August 6 (semifinals and final)
- Competitors: 26 from 17 nations
- Winning time: 13.20 OR

Medalists
1st place, gold medalist(s)		Roger Kingdom; United States
2nd place, silver medalist(s)		Greg Foster; United States
3rd place, bronze medalist(s)		Arto Bryggare; Finland

The men's 110 metres hurdles event at the 1984 Summer Olympics in Los Angeles, California took place on 5 and 6 August 1984. Twenty-six athletes from 17 nations competed. The maximum number of athletes per nation had been set at 3 since the 1930 Olympic Congress. The event was won by Roger Kingdom of the United States, the nation's first championship since 1972 and 16th title in the event overall. Arto Bryggare's bronze was Finland's first medal in the men's high hurdles.

== Background ==
This was the 20th appearance of the event, which is one of 12 athletics events to have been held at every Summer Olympics. Two finalists from 1980 returned: sixth-place finisher Arto Bryggare of Finland and seventh-place finisher Javier Moracho of Spain. The 1980 champion, Thomas Munkelt of East Germany, was kept out due to the Soviet-led boycott. World record holder Renaldo Nehemiah of the United States was also prevented from competing, because the IOC claimed "he had lost his amateur status" by playing professional football, an entirely different sport. The favorite therefore was 1983 World Champion Greg Foster of the United States, though as usual all of the American hurdlers were potential medalists. Bryggare had come in second at the world championships and was also a contender.

Algeria, the People's Republic of China, Paraguay, Samoa, and the United Arab Emirates each made their first appearance in the event; the Republic of China competed as "Chinese Taipei" for the first time. The United States made its 19th appearance, most of any nation (having missed only the boycotted 1980 Games).

== Competition format ==
The competition continued to use the three-round format used since 1908 (except 1960, which had four rounds) and eight-man semifinals and finals used since 1964. The "fastest loser" system, also introduced in 1964, was not used as unnecessary for achieving the correct number of hurdlers advancing to the semifinals and final.

The first round consisted of four heats, with 6 or 7 hurdlers each. The top four hurdlers in each heat advanced to the semifinals. The 16 semifinalists were divided into two semifinals of 8 hurdlers each; the top four hurdlers in each advanced to the 8-man final.

== Records ==
These were the standing world and Olympic records (in seconds) prior to the 1984 Summer Olympics.

World record	Renaldo Nehemiah (USA)	12.93	Zürich, Switzerland	19 August 1981
Olympic record	Rod Milburn (USA)	13.24	Munich, East Germany	7 September 1972

Greg Foster equalized the standing Olympic record with 13.24 seconds; he and Roger Kingdom both matched that time in the semifinals as well. In the final, Kingdom set a new Olympic record with 13.20 seconds, with Foster also coming in under the old record (with 13.23 seconds).

== Schedule ==
All times are Pacific Daylight Time (UTC-7)

Date	Time	Round
Sunday, 5 August 1984	16:25	Round 1
Monday, 6 August 1984	16:00; 18:05	Semifinals; Final

== Results ==
=== Round 1 ===
==== Heat 1 ====
Rank	Lane	Athlete	Nation	Time	Notes
1	2	Arto Bryggare	Finland	13.35	Q
2	3	Mark McKoy	Canada	13.58	Q
3	5	Daniele Fontecchio	Italy	13.75	Q
4	6	Yu Zhicheng	China	14.20	Q
5	4	Mohamed Ryad Ben Haddad	Algeria	14.44	
6	7	Nicolás Chaparro	Paraguay	15.51	
—	1	Mark Holtom	Great Britain	DSQ	
				Wind: +2.0 m/s	

==== Heat 2 ====
Rank	Lane	Athlete	Nation	Time	Notes
1	5	Tonie Campbell	United States	13.53	Q
2	4	Carlos Sala	Spain	14.02	Q
3	3	Wilbert Greaves	Great Britain	14.04	Q
4	1	Jeff Glass	Canada	14.07	Q
5	6	Franck Chevallier	France	14.32	
6	2	Hisham Mohamed Mekin	Egypt	14.67	
				Wind: -0.5 m/s	

==== Heat 3 ====
Rank	Lane	Athlete	Nation	Time	Notes
1	1	Roger Kingdom	United States	13.53	Q
2	3	Javier Moracho	Spain	14.05	Q
3	4	Nigel Walker	Great Britain	14.07	Q
4	2	Li Jieqiang	China	14.29	Q
5	6	Naji Mubarak	Kuwait	14.56	
6	5	Eric Spence	Canada	14.93	
				Wind: -0.5 m/s	

==== Heat 4 ====
Rank	Lane	Athlete	Nation	Time	Notes
1	3	Greg Foster	United States	13.24	Q, =OR
2	6	Stéphane Caristan	France	13.45	Q
3	7	Wu Chin-ling	Chinese Taipei	13.91	Q
4	4	Donald Wright	Australia	14.00	Q
5	1	Modesto Castillo	Dominican Republic	14.05	
6	5	Mohamed Helal Ali	United Arab Emirates	15.75	
—	2	William Fong	Western Samoa	DNF	
				Wind: +1.7 m/s	

=== Semifinals ===
==== Semifinal 1 ====
Rank	Lane	Athlete	Nation	Time	Notes
1	1	Roger Kingdom	United States	13.24	Q, =OR
2	5	Tonie Campbell	United States	13.56	Q
3	8	Stéphane Caristan	France	13.62	Q
4	7	Jeff Glass	Canada	13.88	Q
5	6	Javier Moracho	Spain	13.89	
6	3	Wu Chin-Jing	Chinese Taipei	14.21	
7	2	Yu Zhicheng	China	14.26	
—	4	Nigel Walker	Great Britain	DNF	
				Wind: +0.7 m/s	

==== Semifinal 2 ====
Rank	Lane	Athlete	Nation	Time	Notes
1	4	Greg Foster	United States	13.24	Q, =OR
2	8	Mark McKoy	Canada	13.30	Q
3	5	Arto Bryggare	Finland	13.52	Q
4	1	Carlos Sala	Spain	13.85	Q
5	6	Wilbert Greaves	Great Britain	13.86	
6	2	Daniele Fontecchio	Italy	13.86	
7	3	Donald Wright	Australia	13.93	
8	7	Li Jieqiang	China	14.15	
				Wind: -1.1 m/s	

=== Final ===
Rank	Lane	Athlete	Nation	Reaction	Time	Notes
1st place, gold medalist(s)	8	Roger Kingdom	United States	0.137	13.20	OR
2nd place, silver medalist(s)	1	Greg Foster	United States	0.150	13.23	
3rd place, bronze medalist(s)	2	Arto Bryggare	Finland	0.136	13.40	
4	3	Mark McKoy	Canada	0.149	13.45	
5	7	Tonie Campbell	United States	0.144	13.55	
6	6	Stéphane Caristan	France	0.184	13.71	
7	4	Carlos Sala	Spain	0.159	13.80	
8	5	Jeff Glass	Canada	0.170	14.15	
				Wind: -0.4 m/s		

== See also ==
- 1980 Men's Olympic 110m Hurdles (Moscow)
- 1982 Men's European Championships 110m Hurdles (Athens)
- 1983 Men's World Championships 110m Hurdles (Helsinki)
- 1984 Friendship Games 110m Hurdles (Moscow)
- 1986 Men's European Championships 110m Hurdles (Stuttgart)
- 1987 Men's World Championships 110m Hurdles (Rome)
- 1988 Men's Olympic 110m Hurdles (Seoul)
