= 1985 IAAF World Indoor Games – Men's 60 metres hurdles =

The men's 60 metres hurdles event at the 1985 IAAF World Indoor Games was held at the Palais Omnisports Paris-Bercy on 19 January.

== Medalists ==
Gold	Silver	Bronze
Stéphane Caristan; France	Javier Moracho; Spain	Jon Ridgeon; Great Britain

== Results ==
=== Heats ===
First 3 of each heat (Q) and next 3 fastest (q) qualified for the semifinals.

Rank	Heat	Name	Nationality	Time	Notes
1	2	Jon Ridgeon	Great Britain	7.70	Q
2	2	Stéphane Caristan	France	7.73	Q
3	3	Vyacheslav Ustinov	Soviet Union	7.82	Q
4	2	Javier Moracho	Spain	7.85	Q
5	1	Cletus Clark	United States	7.86	Q
6	3	Carlos Sala	Spain	7.87	Q
7	3	Modesto Castillo	Dominican Republic	7.89	Q
8	2	Jeff Glass	Canada	7.90	q
9	3	Gianni Tozzi	Italy	7.91	q
10	1	Luigi Bertocchi	Italy	7.99	Q
11	3	Wu Ching-jing	Chinese Taipei	8.00	q, NR
12	3	Serge Hatil	France	8.01	
13	1	Marc Muster	Switzerland	8.11	Q
14	1	Petter Hesselberg	Norway	8.12	
14	2	Robert Ekpete	Norway	8.12	
16	1	Li Jieqiang	China	8.14	
17	2	Karl Smith	Jamaica	8.19	
18	1	Saïd Kahia	Morocco	8.38	NR

=== Semifinals ===
First 3 of each semifinal (Q) qualified directly for the final.

Rank	Heat	Name	Nationality	Time	Notes
1	2	Stéphane Caristan	France	7.63	Q
2	2	Vyacheslav Ustinov	Soviet Union	7.73	Q
3	1	Cletus Clark	United States	7.74	Q
4	1	Javier Moracho	Spain	7.76	Q
5	1	Jon Ridgeon	Great Britain	7.79	Q
6	2	Modesto Castillo	Dominican Republic	7.83	Q, NR
7	1	Jeff Glass	Canada	7.85	
7	2	Carlos Sala	Spain	7.85	
9	1	Gianni Tozzi	Italy	7.88	
10	2	Wu Ching-jing	Chinese Taipei	8.01	
11	2	Luigi Bertocchi	Italy	8.09	
12	1	Marc Muster	Switzerland	8.10	

=== Final ===
Rank	Lane	Name	Nationality	Time	Notes
1st place, gold medalist(s)	3	Stéphane Caristan	France	7.67	
2nd place, silver medalist(s)	4	Javier Moracho	Spain	7.69	
3rd place, bronze medalist(s)	6	Jon Ridgeon	Great Britain	7.70	
4	2	Cletus Clark	United States	7.74	
5	5	Vyacheslav Ustinov	Soviet Union	7.75	
6	1	Modesto Castillo	Dominican Republic	7.86	
