= João Lima =

João Lima may refer to:

- João Lima (footballer) (born 1996), Portuguese footballer
- João Lima (athlete) (1961–2023), Portuguese hurdler
- João Filgueiras Lima (1931–2014), Brazilian architect
