= Athletics at the 1983 Pan American Games – Men's 110 metres hurdles =

Men's 110 metres hurdles at the Pan American Games

The men's 110 metres hurdles event at the 1983 Pan American Games was held in Caracas, Venezuela on 28 August.

== Results ==
Wind: -3.2 m/s

Rank	Name	Nationality	Time	Notes
1st place, gold medalist(s)	Roger Kingdom	United States	13.44	
2nd place, silver medalist(s)	Alejandro Casañas	Cuba	13.51	
3rd place, bronze medalist(s)	Tonie Campbell	United States	13.54	
4	Modesto Castillo	Dominican Republic	13.90	
5	Jeff Glass	Canada	13.98	
6	Mark McKoy	Canada	14.02	
7	Nelson Rodríguez	Venezuela	14.40	
8	Elvis Cedeño	Venezuela	14.42	
