= Kim Jin-tae =

Kim Jin-tae (Korean: 김진태) can refer to:

- Kim Jin-tae (actor), South Korean actor
- Kim Jin-tae (athlete) (born 1964), South Korean athlete
- Kim Jin-tae (politician) (born 1964), South Korean politician
- Kim Jin-tae (water polo) (born 1968), South Korean water polo player
