= 2012 in Brazilian football =

Football in Brazil
- Season: 2012

The following article presents a summary of the 2012 association football season in Brazil, which was the 111th season of competitive football in the country.

== Campeonato Brasileiro Série A ==
The 2012 Campeonato Brasileiro Série A started on May 20, 2012, and concluded on December 2, 2012.

Pos	Team	Pld	W	D	L	GF	GA	GD	Pts	Qualification or relegation
1	Fluminense (C)	38	22	11	5	61	33	+28	77	2013 Copa Libertadores Second Stage
2	Atlético Mineiro	38	20	12	6	64	37	+27	72	2013 Copa Libertadores Second Stage
3	Grêmio	38	20	11	7	56	33	+23	71	2013 Copa Libertadores First Stage
4	São Paulo	38	20	6	12	59	37	+22	66	2013 Copa Libertadores First Stage
5	Vasco da Gama	38	16	10	12	45	44	+1	58	
6	Corinthians	38	15	12	11	51	39	+12	57	2013 Copa Libertadores Second Stage (Note: Corinthians qualified for the second stage of the 2013 Copa Libertadores as the 2012 Copa Libertadores champion.)
7	Botafogo	38	15	10	13	60	50	+10	55	
8	Santos	38	13	14	11	50	44	+6	53	
9	Cruzeiro	38	15	7	16	47	51	−4	52	
10	Internacional	38	13	13	12	44	40	+4	52	
11	Flamengo	38	12	14	12	38	45	−7	50	
12	Náutico	38	14	7	17	44	51	−7	49	
13	Coritiba	38	14	6	18	53	60	−7	48	
14	Ponte Preta	38	12	12	14	37	44	−7	48	
15	Bahia	38	11	14	13	37	41	−4	47	
16	Portuguesa	38	10	15	13	39	41	−2	45	
17	Sport Recife	38	10	11	17	39	56	−17	41	Relegation to 2013 Série B
18	Palmeiras	38	9	7	22	39	54	−15	34	Copa Libertadores Second Stage and relegation to Série B (Note: Palmeiras qualified for the second stage of the 2013 Copa Libertadores as the 2012 Copa do Brasil champion.)
19	Atlético Goianiense	38	7	9	22	37	67	−30	30	Relegation to 2013 Série B
20	Figueirense	38	7	9	22	39	72	−33	30	Relegation to 2013 Série B

Updated to match(es) played on unknown. Source: UOL.com.br
Rules for classification: 1st points; 2nd wins; 3rd goal difference; 4th goals scored; 5th head-to-head results; 6th least red cards received; 7th least yellow cards received; 8th draw
(C) Champions
Notes:

Fluminense declared as the Campeonato Brasileiro Série A champions.

=== Relegation ===
The four worst placed teams, which are Sport, Palmeiras, Atlético Goianiense and Figueirense, were relegated to the following year's second level.

== Campeonato Brasileiro Série B ==
The 2012 Campeonato Brasileiro Série B started on May 19, 2012, and concluded on November 24, 2012.

Pos	Team	Pld	W	D	L	GF	GA	GD	Pts	Promotion or relegation
1	Goiás (C, P)	38	23	9	6	75	37	+38	78	Promotion to Série A
2	Criciúma (P)	38	22	7	9	78	57	+21	73	Promotion to Série A
3	Atlético Paranaense (P)	38	21	8	9	65	37	+28	71	Promotion to Série A
4	Vitória (P)	38	21	8	9	59	43	+16	71	Promotion to Série A
5	São Caetano	38	20	11	7	58	38	+20	71	
6	Joinville	38	17	9	12	58	40	+18	60	
7	Avaí	38	18	5	15	44	42	+2	59	
8	América Mineiro	38	16	7	15	63	58	+5	55	
9	América de Natal	38	14	12	12	60	61	−1	54	
10	Paraná	38	14	9	15	49	46	+3	51	
11	Ceará	38	12	11	15	51	52	−1	47	
12	ABC	38	11	12	15	50	52	−2	45	
13	ASA	38	13	5	20	48	56	−8	44	
14	Bragantino	38	12	8	18	45	53	−8	44	
15	Boa Esporte	38	11	11	16	51	63	−12	44	
16	Guaratinguetá	38	13	4	21	41	63	−22	43	
17	CRB (R)	38	12	6	20	47	67	−20	42	Relegation to Série C
18	Guarani (R)	38	10	11	17	36	47	−11	41	Relegation to Série C
19	Ipatinga (R)	38	8	7	23	38	73	−35	31	Relegation to Série C
20	Grêmio Barueri (R)	38	7	9	22	38	69	−31	30	Relegation to Série C

Updated to match(es) played on 24 November 2012. Source: Campeonato Brasileiro Série B
Rules for classification: 1st points; 2nd wins; 3rd goal difference; 4th goals scored; 5th head-to-head results; 6th least red cards received; 7th least yellow cards received; 8th draw.
(C) Champions; (P) Promoted; (R) Relegated

Goiás declared as the Campeonato Brasileiro Série B champions.

=== Promotion ===
The four best placed teams, which are Goiás, Criciúma, Atlético Paranaense and Vitória, were promoted to the following year's first level.

=== Relegation ===
The four worst placed teams, which are CRB, Guarani, Ipatinga and Grêmio Barueri, were relegated to the following year's third level.

== Campeonato Brasileiro Série C ==
The 2012 Campeonato Brasileiro Série C started on June 30, 2012, and concluded on December 1, 2012.

- Águia de Marabá
- Brasiliense
- Caxias
- Chapecoense
- Cuiabá
- Duque de Caxias
- Fortaleza
- Guarany de Sobral
- Icasa
- Luverdense
- Macaé
- Madureira
- Oeste
- Paysandu
- Salgueiro
- Santa Cruz
- Santo André
- Treze
- Tupi
- Vila Nova

The Campeonato Brasileiro Série C final was played between Oeste and Icasa.

November 28, 2012

Icasa	0–0	Oeste

Romeirão

December 1, 2012

Oeste	2–0	Icasa

Estádio dos Amaros

Oeste declared as the league champions by aggregate score of 2–0.

=== Promotion ===
The four best placed teams, which are Oeste, Icasa, Paysandu and Chapecoense, were promoted to the following year's second level.

=== Relegation ===
The four worst placed teams, which are Salgueiro, Santo André, Guarany de Sobral and Tupi, were relegated to the following year's fourth level.

== Campeonato Brasileiro Série D ==
The 2012 Campeonato Brasileiro Série D started on June 23, 2012, and concluded on October 21, 2012.

- Aparecidense
- Aracruz
- Araguaína
- Arapongas
- Atlético Acreano
- Baraúnas
- Brasil de Pelotas
- Campinense
- Ceilândia
- CENE
- Cerâmica
- Cianorte
- Comercial (PI)
- CRAC
- CSA
- Feirense
- Friburguense
- Guarani (MG)
- Horizonte
- Interporto
- Itabaiana
- Juventude
- Marcílio Dias
- Marília
- Metropolitano
- Mirassol
- Mixto
- Mogi Mirim
- Nacional (MG)
- Náutico (RR)
- Penarol
- Petrolina
- Remo
- Sampaio Corrêa
- Santos (AP)
- Sousa
- Vilhena
- Vitória da Conquista
- Volta Redonda
- Ypiranga (PE)

The Campeonato Brasileiro Série D final was played between CRAC and Sampaio Corrêa.

October 14, 2012

CRAC	1–1	Sampaio Corrêa

Estádio Genervino da Fonseca

October 21, 2012

Sampaio Corrêa	2–0	CRAC

Castelão

Sampaio Corrêa declared as the league champions by aggregate score of 3–1.

=== Promotion ===
The four best placed teams, which are Sampaio Corrêa, CRAC, Baraúnas and Mogi Mirim, were promoted to the following year's third level.

== Copa do Brasil ==
The 2012 Copa do Brasil started on March 7, 2012, and concluded on July 11, 2012. The Copa do Brasil final was played between Palmeiras and Coritiba.

July 5, 2012

Palmeiras	2–0	Coritiba

Arena Barueri

July 11, 2012

Coritiba	1–1	Palmeiras

Couto Pereira

Palmeiras declared as the cup champions by aggregate score of 3–1.

== State championship champions ==
State	Champion
(Acre (state)) Acre	Rio Branco-AC
Alagoas	CRB
Amapá	Oratório
(Amazonas (Brazilian state)) Amazonas	Nacional-AM
Bahia	Bahia
Ceará	Ceará
(Federal District (Brazil)) Distrito Federal	Ceilândia
Espírito Santo	Aracruz
Goiás	Goiás
Maranhão	Sampaio Corrêa
Mato Grosso	Luverdense
Mato Grosso do Sul	Águia Negra
Minas Gerais	Atlético Mineiro
Pará	Cametá
Paraíba	Campinense
(Paraná (state)) Paraná	Coritiba
Pernambuco	Santa Cruz
Piauí	Parnahyba
(Rio de Janeiro (state)) Rio de Janeiro	Fluminense
Rio Grande do Norte	América-RN
Rio Grande do Sul	Internacional
Rondônia	Ji-Paraná
Roraima	São Raimundo-RR
(Santa Catarina (state)) Santa Catarina	Avaí
(São Paulo (state)) São Paulo	Santos
Sergipe	Itabaiana
Tocantins	Gurupi

== Youth competition champions ==
Competition	Champion
Campeonato Brasileiro Sub-17	Internacional
Campeonato Brasileiro Sub-20	Cruzeiro
Copa Brasil Sub-17 (Copa Nacional do Espírito Santo Sub-17)^{(1)}	Atlético Paranaense
Copa do Brasil Sub-20	Vitória
Copa Rio Sub-17	Internacional
Copa Santiago de Futebol Juvenil	Internacional
Copa São Paulo de Futebol Júnior	Corinthians
Copa Sub-17 de Promissão	Figueirense
Taça Belo Horizonte de Juniores	Grêmio
Copa 2 de Julho Sub-17	Vitória

^{(1)} The Copa Nacional do Espírito Santo Sub-17, between 2008 and 2012, was named Copa Brasil Sub-17. The similar named Copa do Brasil Sub-17 is organized by the Brazilian Football Confederation and it was first played in 2013.

== Other competition champions ==
Competition	Champion
Campeonato Paulista do Interior	Mogi Mirim
Copa Espírito Santo	Desportiva
Copa FGF	Juventude
Copa Governador do Mato Grosso	Mixto
Copa Paulista de Futebol	Noroeste
Copa Pernambuco	Santa Cruz
Copa Rio	Nova Iguaçu
Copa Santa Catarina	Joinville
Taça Minas Gerais	Boa Esporte

== Brazilian clubs in international competitions ==
Team	2012 Copa Libertadores	2012 Copa Sudamericana	2012 Recopa Sudamericana	2012 FIFA Club World Cup
Atlético Goianiense	N/A	Round of 16 eliminated by (Chile) Universidad Católica	N/A	N/A
Bahia	N/A	Second Stage eliminated by (Brazil) São Paulo	N/A	N/A
Botafogo	N/A	Second Stage eliminated by (Brazil) Palmeiras	N/A	N/A
Corinthians	Champions defeated (Argentina) Boca Juniors	N/A	N/A	Champions defeated (England) Chelsea
Coritiba	N/A	Second Stage eliminated by (Brazil) Grêmio	N/A	N/A
Figueirense	N/A	Second Stage eliminated by (Brazil) Atlético Goianiense	N/A	N/A
Flamengo	Eliminated in the Second Stage	N/A	N/A	N/A
Fluminense	Quarterfinals eliminated by (Argentina) Boca Juniors	N/A	N/A	N/A
Grêmio	N/A	Quarterfinals eliminated by (Colombia) Millonarios	N/A	N/A
Internacional	Round of 16 eliminated by (Brazil) Fluminense	N/A	N/A	N/A
Palmeiras	N/A	Round of 16 eliminated by (Colombia) Millonarios	N/A	N/A
Santos	Semifinals eliminated by (Brazil) Corinthians	N/A	Champions defeated Universidad de Chile	N/A
São Paulo	N/A	Champions defeated (Argentina) Tigre	N/A	N/A
Vasco da Gama	Quarterfinals eliminated by (Brazil) Corinthians	N/A	N/A	N/A

== Brazil national team ==
The following table lists all the games played by the Brazilian national team in official competitions and friendly matches during 2012.

February 28, 2012 International friendly	Bosnia and Herzegovina	1–2	Brazil	St. Gallen, Switzerland
	Ibišević 13'		Marcelo 4'; Papac 90+1' (o.g.)	Stadium: AFG Arena; Attendance: 17,500; Referee: Sascha Kever (Switzerland)

May 26, 2012 International friendly	Denmark	1–3	Brazil	Hamburg, Germany
	Bendtner 71'		Hulk 8', 40'; Zimling 13' (o.g.)	Stadium: Imtech Arena; Attendance: 52,000; Referee: Felix Brych (Germany)

May 30, 2012 International friendly	United States	1–4	Brazil	Landover, Maryland, United States
20:00 UTC−05	Gomez 45'		Neymar 12' (pen.); Silva 26'; Marcelo 52'; Pato 87'	Stadium: FedExField; Attendance: 67,619; Referee: Jeffrey Solís (Costa Rica)

June 3, 2012 International friendly	Mexico	2–0	Brazil	Arlington, Texas, United States
16:06 UTC-3	G. dos Santos 22'; Hernández 33' (pen.)			Stadium: Cowboys Stadium; Attendance: 84,519; Referee: Silviu Petrescu (Canada)

June 9, 2012 International friendly	Brazil	3–4	Argentina	East Rutherford, New Jersey, United States
	Rômulo 23'; Oscar 56'; Hulk 72'		Messi 31', 34', 85'; Fernández 76'	Stadium: MetLife Stadium; Attendance: 81,994; Referee: Jair Marrufo (United States)

August 15, 2012 International friendly	Sweden	0–3	Brazil	Solna, Sweden
			Leandro Damião 32'; Pato 84', 86' (pen.)	Stadium: Råsunda Stadium; Attendance: 32,781; Referee: Viktor Kassai (Hungary)

September 7, 2012 International friendly	Brazil	1–0	South Africa	São Paulo, Brazil
	Hulk 74'			Stadium: Estádio do Morumbi; Attendance: 51,500; Referee: Néstor Pitana (Argentina)

September 10, 2012 International friendly	Brazil	8–0	China	Recife, Brazil
	Ramires 23'; Neymar 26', 54', 60'; Lucas 49'; Hulk 52'; Liu Jianye 70' (o.g.); Oscar 76' (pen.)			Stadium: Estádio do Arruda; Attendance: 29,658; Referee: Roberto Silvera (Uruguay)

September 19, 2012 Superclásico de las Américas	Brazil	2–1	Argentina	Goiânia, Brazil
	Paulinho 26'; Neymar 90+4' (pen.)	Report	Martínez 20'	Stadium: Estádio Serra Dourada; Attendance: 37,871; Referee: Carlos Amarilla (Paraguay)

October 3, 2012 Superclásico de las Américas	Argentina	Canceled	Brazil	Resistencia, Argentina
				Stadium: Estadio Centenario
Note: The second leg of the 2012 Superclasico de Las Américas was canceled due to a floodlight failure. Both AFA and CBF agreed to play the canceled game at a later date.

October 11, 2012 International friendly	Brazil	6–0	Iraq	Malmö, Sweden
20:30 (UTC+2)	Oscar 22', 27'; Kaká 48'; Hulk 56'; Neymar 75'; Lucas 80'			Stadium: Swedbank Stadion; Attendance: 14,147; Referee: Martin Hansson (Sweden)

October 16, 2012 International friendly	Brazil	4–0	Japan	Wrocław, Poland
14:10 (UTC+1)	Paulinho 12'; Neymar 25' (pen.), 48'; Kaká 76'			Stadium: Stadion Miejski; Attendance: 36,000; Referee: Marcin Borski (Poland)

November 14, 2012 International friendly	Brazil	1–1	Colombia	East Rutherford, New Jersey, United States
19:30 (UTC-3)	Neymar 64'		Cuadrado 44'	Stadium: MetLife Stadium; Attendance: 38,624; Referee: Mark Geiger (United States)

November 21, 2012 Superclásico de las Américas	Argentina	2–1 (3 - 4 p)	Brazil	Buenos Aires, Argentina
	Scocco 82' (pen.), 90'	Report	Fred 84'	Stadium: La Bombonera; Attendance: 32,000; Referee: Enrique Osses (Chile)
	Penalties
	Martínez (penalty missed); Montillo (penalty missed); Domínguez (penalty scored); Scocco (penalty scored); Orión (penalty scored)		(penalty scored) Neves; (penalty scored) Jean; (penalty missed) Carlinhos; (penalty scored) Fred; (penalty scored) Neymar
Note: The game was originally scheduled to be played on October 3, but it was moved to November 21 due to a floodlight failure.

== Women's football ==
=== National team ===
The following table lists all the games played by the Brazil women's national football team in official competitions and friendly matches during 2012.

March 24, 2012 International friendly	Canada	2–1	Brazil	Boston, United States
	Christine Sinclair (?)	Report	Gabriela (?)	Stadium: Gillette Stadium

April 3, 2012 Kirin Cup	United States	3–0	Brazil	Chiba, Japan
	Carli Lloyd 18'; Shannon Boxx 23'; Amy Rodriguez 83'	Report		Stadium: Fukuda Denshi Arena

April 5, 2012 Kirin Cup	Japan	4–1	Brazil	Kobe, Japan
	Bagé 16' (o.g.); Nagasato 58'; Aya Miyama 61'; Yukari Kinga 89'	Report	Francielle 45'	Stadium: Home's Stadium

July 11, 2012 International friendly (unofficial match)	Kriens (Switzerland)	0–2	Brazil	Fribourg, Switzerland
		Report	Thaisinha (?); Formiga (?)	Stadium: Stade Universitaire Saint-Léonard; Referee: Desireé Grudbacher (Switzerland)

July 14, 2012 Matchworld Women's Cup	Brazil	2–1	Colombia	Châtel-Saint-Denis, Switzerland
	Rosana (?); Formiga (?)	Report	Oriánica Velásquez (?)	Stadium: Stade du Lussy; Referee: Jorge Mendez (Switzerland)

July 17, 2012 Matchworld Women's Cup	Brazil	2–1	Canada	Savièse, Switzerland
	Formiga 42'; Grazielle 92'	Report	Christine Sinclair 91'	Stadium: Stade Saint-Germain; Referee: Simona Ghisletta (Switzerland)

July 25, 2012 Summer Olympics; Group stage	Cameroon	0–5	Brazil	Cardiff, Wales
18:45		Report	Francielle 7'; Renata Costa 10'; Marta 73' (pen.), 88'; Cristiane 78'	Stadium: Millennium Stadium; Referee: Jenny Palmqvist (Sweden)

July 28, 2012 Summer Olympics; Group stage	New Zealand	0–1	Brazil	Cardiff, Wales
14:30		Report	Cristiane 86'	Stadium: Millennium Stadium; Attendance: 30,103; Referee: Bibiana Steinhaus (Germany)

July 31, 2012 Summer Olympics; Group stage	Great Britain	1–0	Brazil	London, England
19:45	Houghton 2'	Report		Stadium: Wembley Stadium; Attendance: 70,584; Referee: Carol Anne Chenard (Canada)

August 3, 2012 Summer Olympics; Quarterfinals	Brazil	0–2	Japan	Cardiff, Wales
17:00		Report	Ōgimi 27'; Ohno 73'	Stadium: Millennium Stadium; Referee: Kirsi Heikkinen (Finland)

December 9, 2012 Torneio Internacional Feminino	Brazil	4–0	Portugal	São Paulo, Brazil
16:00	Cristiane 8'; Fabiana Baiana 35'; Marta 46'; Giovania 80'	Report		Stadium: Estádio do Pacaembu; Referee: Katiucia da Mota Lima (Brazil)

December 13, 2012 Torneio Internacional Feminino	Brazil	1–2	Mexico	São Paulo, Brazil
21:50	Rosana 14'	Report	Guajardo 61'; Dominguez 89'	Stadium: Estádio do Pacaembu

December 16, 2012 Torneio Internacional Feminino	Brazil	2–1	Denmark	São Paulo, Brazil
16:00	Érika 7'; Débora 87'	Report	Line Hansen 90+2' (penalty)	Stadium: Estádio do Pacaembu

December 19, 2011 Torneio Internacional Feminino; Final	Brazil	2–2	Denmark	São Paulo, Brazil
20:50	Andressa 29' (pen.); Fabiana 45+3'	Report	Rasmussen 83'; Junge 87'	Stadium: Estádio do Pacaembu; Referee: Regildenia de Holanda Moura (Brazil)

The Brazil women's national football team competed in the following competitions in 2012:

Competition	Performance
Kirin Cup	Third place
Summer Olympics	Quarterfinals
Torneio Internacional Feminino	Champions

=== Copa do Brasil de Futebol Feminino ===
The 2012 Copa do Brasil de Futebol Feminino started on March 3, 2012, and concluded on June 10, 2012.

June 3, 2012

São José	1–0	Centro Olímpico

Estádio Martins Pereira

June 10, 2012

Centro Olímpico	2–4	São José

Estádio do Pacaembu

São José declared as the cup champions by aggregate score of 5–2.

=== Domestic competition champions ===
Competition	Champion
Campeonato Carioca	Vasco da Gama
Campeonato Paulista	São José

=== Brazilian clubs in international competitions ===
Team	2012 Copa Libertadores Femenina
Foz Cataratas	Runners-up lost to (Chile) Colo Colo
São José	Third Place defeated (Brazil) Vitória das Tabocas
Vitória das Tabocas	Fourth Place defeated by (Brazil) São José
