= Franck Chevallier =

French hurdler

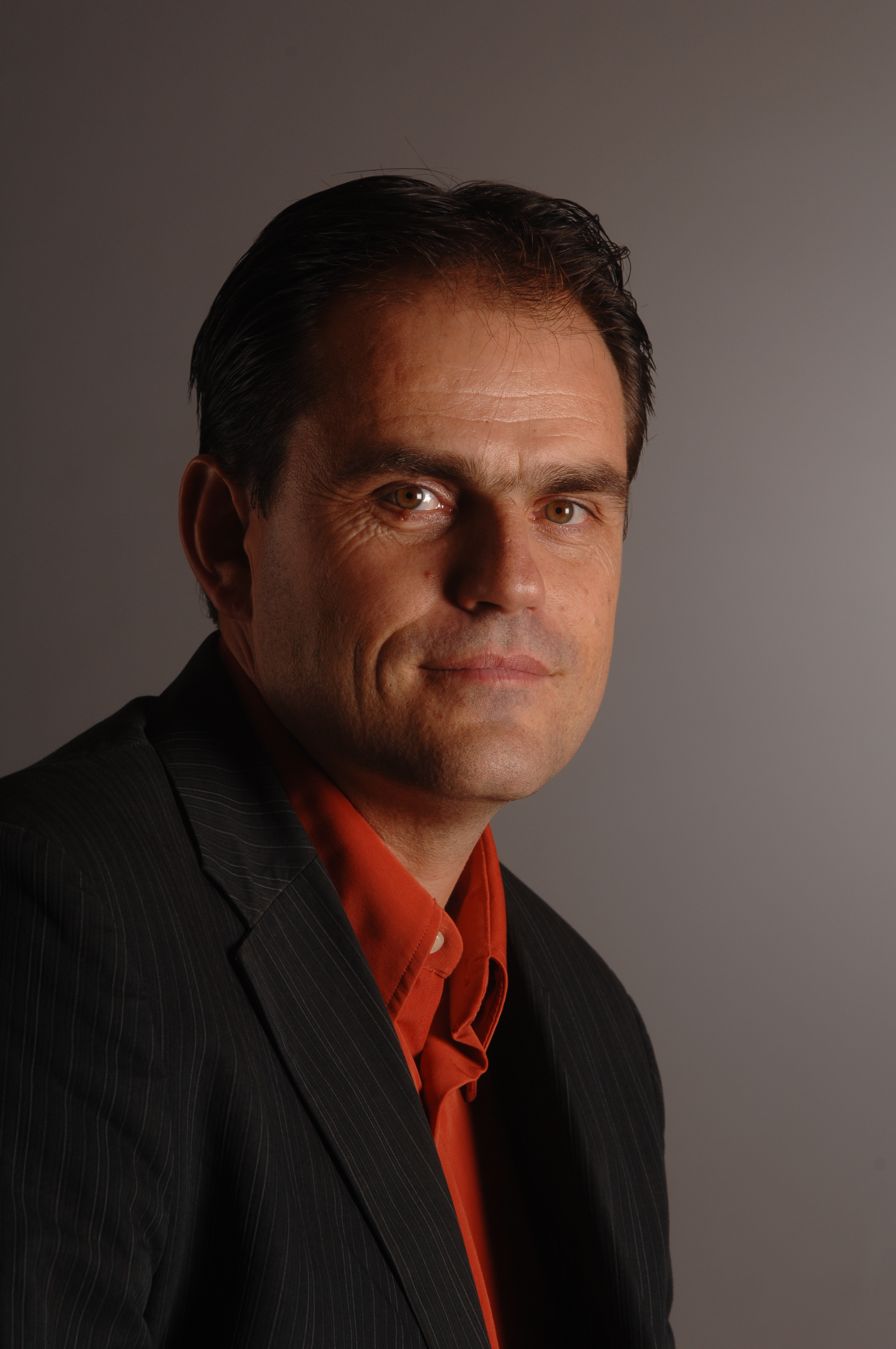

Personal information
- Nationality: French
- Born: 3 January 1964 (age 62)

Sport
- Sport: Track and field
- Event: 110 metres hurdles

Franck Chevallier (born 3 January 1964) is a French hurdler. He competed in the men's 110 metres hurdles at the 1984 Summer Olympics.
