= Stéphane Caristan =

French hurdler (born 1964)

Personal information
- Born: 31 May 1964 (age 62) Créteil, France
- Height: 1.87 m (6 ft 2 in)
- Weight: 75 kg (165 lb)

Sport
- Sport: Athletics
- Events: 110 m hurdles, 400 m hurdles
- Club: AC Paris-Joinville; US Créteil; Racing CF
Medal record
Men's athletics
Representing France
European Championships
Gold medal – first place	1986 Stuttgart	110 m hurdles

Stéphane Caristan (born 31 May 1964) is a retired hurdler from France, who set the world's best year performance in 1986. He did so by winning the men's 110 metres hurdles final at the European Championships in Stuttgart, clocking 13.20, which was also his personal best. He competed in three consecutive Summer Olympics for his native country, starting in 1984. Caristan later became the coach of French sprinter Christine Arron.

== International competitions ==
Year	Competition	Venue	Position	Event	Notes
Representing France
1983	European Junior Championships	Schwechat, Austria	2nd (h)	110 m hurdles	13.86 (w)^{1}
1983	World Championships	Helsinki, Finland	20th (h)	110 m hurdles	14.10
1984	Olympic Games	Los Angeles, United States	6th	110 m hurdles	13.71
1985	World Indoor Games	Paris, France	1st	60 m hurdles	7.67
1986	European Championships	Stuttgart, West Germany	1st	110 m hurdles	13.20
1987	World Indoor Championships	Indianapolis, United States	2nd	60 m hurdles	7.62
1987	World Championships	Rome, Italy	8th (sf)	110 m hurdles	13.62
1988	Olympic Games	Seoul, South Korea	9th (sf)	110 m hurdles	13.71
1990	European Championships	Split, Yugoslavia	–	110 m hurdles	DNF
1991	Mediterranean Games	Athens, Greece	1st	400 m hurdles	49.27
1992	Olympic Games	Barcelona, Spain	7th	400 m hurdles	48.86
1992	Olympic Games	Barcelona, Spain	11th (h)	4 × 400 m relay	3:04.25
1993	Mediterranean Games	Narbonne, France	8th	400 m hurdles	50.66
1994	European Championships	Helsinki, Finland	27th (h)	400 m hurdles	50.84

^{1}Did not finish in the final

== Personal bests ==
Outdoor

- 110 metres hurdles – 13.20 (+2.0 m/s, Stuttgart 1986)
- 400 metres hurdles – 48.86 (Barcelona 1992)

Indoor

- 60 metres hurdles – 7.50 (Liévin 1987)

Sporting positions
Preceded by (United States) Roger Kingdom	Men's 110 m Hurdles Best Year Performance; 1986	Succeeded by (United States) Greg Foster
