= Mohamed Ryad Ben Haddad =

Algerian hurdler

Personal information
- Nationality: Algerian
- Born: 1 April 1959 (age 67)

Sport
- Sport: Track and field
- Event: 110 metres hurdles

Mohamed Ryad Ben Haddad (born 1 April 1959) is an Algerian hurdler. He competed in the men's 110 metres hurdles at the 1984 Summer Olympics. His personal best is 14.29 seconds.
