= Mikael Ylöstalo =

Finnish hurdler

Personal information
- Born: 2 May 1963 (age 63) Sipoo, Finland

Sport
- Sport: Track and field

Martin Mikael Ylöstalo (born 2 May 1963) is a retired Finnish athlete who specialized in the 110 metres hurdles.

He was born in Sipoo. He competed at the 1987 World Championships and the 1988 Olympic Games without reaching the final round.

He became Finnish champion in 1988 and 1989, rivalling with Arto Bryggare. He also became indoor champion in 1986 and 1990.

His personal best time was 13.64 seconds, achieved in August 1988 in Lohja.
