= Roberto Carmona =

Mexican hurdler

Personal information
- Nationality: Mexican
- Born: Roberto Carmona Alba; 17 September 1969 (age 56)
- Height: 184 cm (6 ft 0 in)
- Weight: 72 kg (159 lb)

Sport
- Sport: Track and field
- Event: 110 metres hurdles

Roberto Carmona Alba (born 17 September 1969) is a Mexican hurdler. He competed in the men's 110 metres hurdles at the 1988 Summer Olympics. His personal best in the 110 metres hurdles is 13.81, which he did in 1988.
