= Yang Guang (hurdler) =

Chinese hurdler

Personal information
- Nationality: Chinese
- Born: 3 April 1963 (age 63)

Sport
- Sport: Track and field
- Event: 110 metres hurdles
Medal record
Men's athletics
Representing China
Asian Championships
Gold medal – first place	1987 Singapore	110 m hurdles

Yang Guang (楊 光, born 3 April 1963) is a Chinese hurdler. He competed in the men's 110 metres hurdles at the 1988 Summer Olympics.
