= Mohamed Helal Ali =

Emirati hurdler

Personal information
- Nationality: Emirati

Sport
- Sport: Track and field
- Event: 110 metres hurdles

Mohamed Helal Ali is an Emirati hurdler. He competed in the men's 110 metres hurdles at the 1984 Summer Olympics.
