= Youssef Al-Dosari =

Saudi Arabian hurdler

Personal information
- Nationality: Saudi Arabian
- Born: 12 January 1962 (age 64)

Sport
- Sport: Track and field
- Event: 110 metres hurdles

Youssef Al-Dosari (Arabic: يوسف الدوسري; born 12 January 1962) is a Saudi Arabian hurdler. He competed in the men's 110 metres hurdles at the 1988 Summer Olympics.
