= Richard Bucknor =

Jamaican hurdler (born 1966)

Personal information
- Born: 6 November 1966 (age 59)

Sport
- Sport: Track and field
- Club: Texas A&M Aggies

Richard Bucknor (born 6 November 1966) is a Jamaican athlete specializing in the 110m hurdles. He competed in the 1988 Summer Olympics in Seoul, finishing 12th, and in the 1992 Summer Olympics in Barcelona. In 1990, while a part of Texas A&M's track team, he was awarded the All-American title.
