= Nagi Ghazi Moursine =

Iraqi hurdler

Personal information
- Nationality: Iraqi
- Born: 1963 (age 62–63)

Sport
- Sport: Track and field
- Event: 110 metres hurdles

Nagi Ghazi Moursine (born 1963) is an Iraqi hurdler. He competed in the men's 110 metres hurdles at the 1988 Summer Olympics.
