= Curt Hampstead =

Guyanese athlete

Personal information
- Nationality: Guyanese
- Born: 17 June 1962 (age 64)

Sport
- Sport: Track and field
- Event: 110 metres hurdles

Curt Hampstead (born 17 June 1962) is a Guyanese hurdler. He competed in the men's 110 metres hurdles at the 1988 Summer Olympics.
