= Modesto Castillo =

Modesto Castillo (born 24 February 1959, in La Romana, Dominican Republic) is a former sprint and hurdling athlete who specialised in the 110 metres hurdles.

Castillo represented the Dominican Republic at the 1984 Summer Olympics in Los Angeles, United States, being eliminated in the first round of the 110 metres hurdles after finishing fifth in his heat. Four years later he competed for the Dominican team at the 1988 Summer Olympics in Seoul, South Korea. He qualified from his heat in the 110 metres hurdles before being eliminated in the quarterfinals.

== International competitions ==
| Year | Competition | Venue | Position | Event | Notes |
Representing the Dominican Republic
| 1980 | Central American and Caribbean; Junior Championships (U20) | Nassau, Bahamas | 1st | 110 m hurdles | 14.0 |
| 1980 | Pan American Junior Championships | Nassau, Bahamas | 4th | 110 m hurdles | 14.57 |
| 1980 | Pan American Junior Championships | Nassau, Bahamas | 6th | 400 m hurdles | 57.97 |
| 1980 | Pan American Junior Championships | Nassau, Bahamas | 5th | 4 × 100 m relay | 42.88 |
| 1981 | Central American and Caribbean Championships | Santo Domingo, Dominican Republic | 3rd | 110 m hurdles | 14.20 |
| 1982 | Central American and Caribbean Games | Havana, Cuba | 3rd | 110 m hurdles | 13.95 |
| 1983 | Central American and Caribbean Championships | Havana, Cuba | 2nd | 110 m hurdles | 13.79 (w) |
| 1983 | World Championships | Helsinki, Finland | 13th (sf) | 110 m hurdles | 14.23 |
| 1983 | Pan American Games | Caracas, Venezuela | 4th | 110 m hurdles | 13.90 |
| 1984 | Olympic Games | Los Angeles, United States | 12th (h) | 110 m hurdles | 14.05 |
| 1985 | World Indoor Games | Paris, France | 19th (h) | 60 m | 6.85 |
| 1985 | World Indoor Games | Paris, France | 6th | 60 m hurdles | 7.86 |
| 1986 | Central American and Caribbean Games | Santiago, Dominican Republic | 4th | 110 m hurdles | 14.22 |
| 1987 | Central American and Caribbean Championships | Caracas, Venezuela | 3rd | 110 m hurdles | 14.06 |
| 1987 | Central American and Caribbean Championships | Caracas, Venezuela | 3rd | 4 × 100 m relay | 40.65 |
| 1987 | Pan American Games | Indianapolis, United States | 2nd | 110 m hurdles | 13.96 |
| 1987 | Pan American Games | Indianapolis, United States | 6th | 4 × 100 m relay | 40.53 |
| 1988 | Olympic Games | Seoul, South Korea | 23rd (qf) | 110 m hurdles | 14.21 |
| 1996 | Ibero-American Championships | Medellín, Colombia | – | 110 m hurdles | DNF |
