= Hisham Mohamed Mekin =

Egyptian hurdler

Personal information
- Nationality: Egyptian
- Born: 3 August 1959 (age 66)

Sport
- Sport: Track and field
- Event: 110 metres hurdles

Hisham Mohamed Mekin (born 3 August 1959) is an Egyptian hurdler. He competed in the men's 110 metres hurdles at the 1984 Summer Olympics.
