= Li Jieqiang =

Chinese hurdler

Personal information
- Nationality: Chinese
- Born: 25 May 1959 (age 67)

Sport
- Sport: Track and field
- Event: 110 metres hurdles
Medal record
Men's athletics
Representing China
Asian Championships
Bronze medal – third place	1985 Jakarta	110 m hurdles

Li Jieqiang (born 25 May 1959) is a Chinese hurdler. He competed in the men's 110 metres hurdles at the 1984 Summer Olympics.
