= Roger Kingdom =

American hurdler (born 1962)

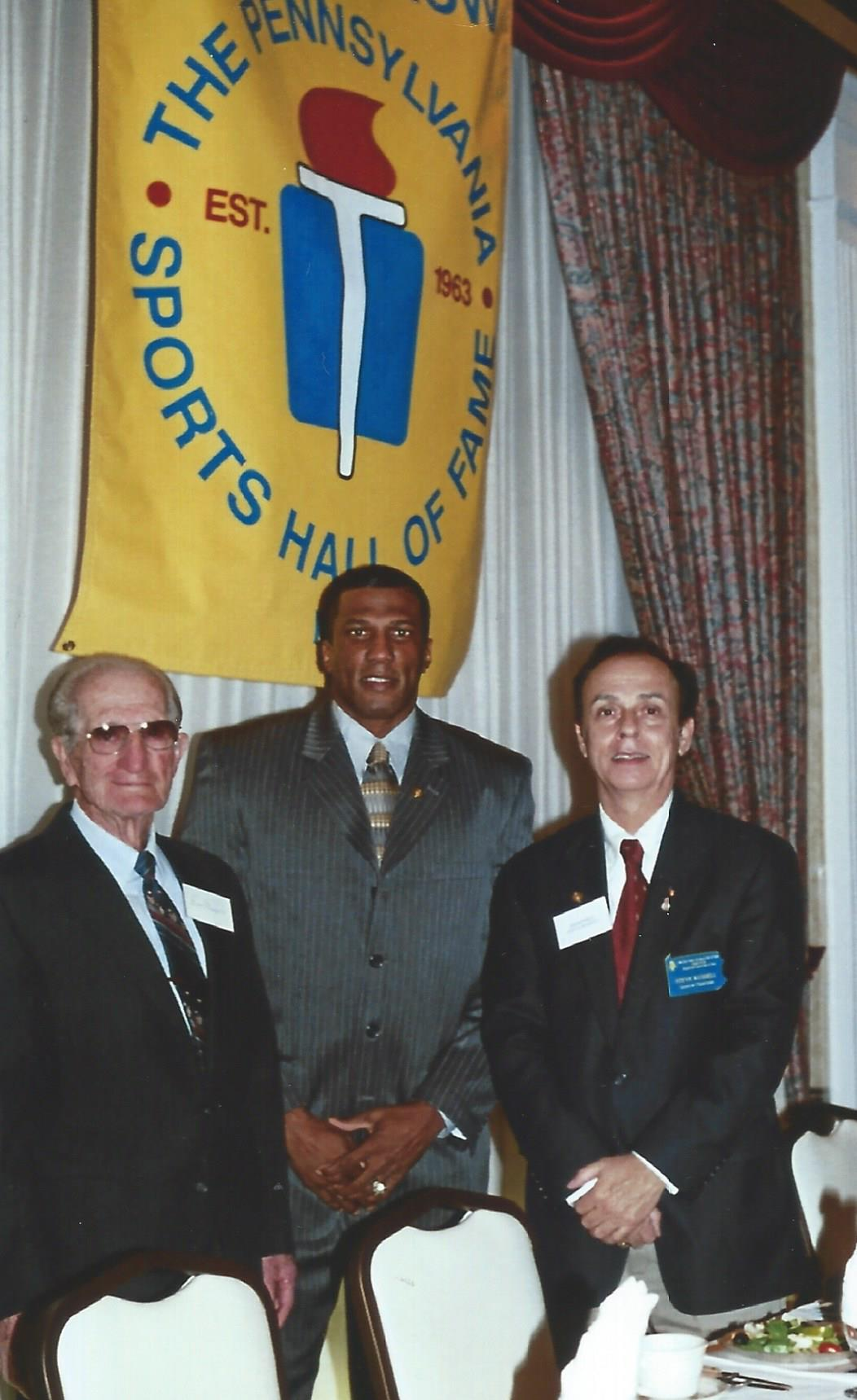
- Kingdom (center)

Personal information
- Full name: Roger Nona Kingdom
- Born: August 26, 1962 (age 64) Vienna, Georgia, United States
- Education: University of Pittsburgh
- Height: 185 cm (6 ft 1 in)
- Weight: 91 kg (201 lb)
Medal record
Men's athletics
Representing the United States
Olympic Games
Gold medal – first place	1984 Los Angeles	110 m hurdles
Gold medal – first place	1988 Seoul	110 m hurdles
World Championships
Bronze medal – third place	1995 Gothenburg	110 m hurdles
IAAF World Indoor Championships
Gold medal – first place	1989 Budapest	60 m hurdles
Summer Universiade
Gold medal – first place	1989 Duisburg	110 m hurdles
IAAF World Cup
Gold medal – first place	1989 Barcelona	110 m hurdles
Pan American Games
Gold medal – first place	1983 Caracas	110 m hurdles
Gold medal – first place	1995 Mar del Plata	110 m hurdles
- Updated on 10 February 2014

Roger Kingdom
Career history
- Cal U (2004-2005) Assistant track & field/cross country coach; Cal U (2006-2013) Director of track & field/cross country; Arizona Cardinals (2014–2017) Strength & conditioning coach; UCF (2018) Interim director of track & field/cross country; Tampa Bay Buccaneers (2019–2021) Speed & conditioning coach

Awards and highlights
- As strength & conditioning coach: Super Bowl champion (LV)

Roger Kingdom (born August 26, 1962) is an American former sprint hurdler who was twice Olympic champion in the 110 meters. Kingdom set a world record of 12.92 in 1989. He is now an athletics coach and strength and conditioning coach who currently works as a speed and conditioning coach for the Tampa Bay Buccaneers of the NFL.

== Early life and athletics ==
Born in Vienna, Georgia, an athlete of note Kingdom excelled at the high jump and discus in his formative years as well as being a noteworthy American football player. He attended the University of Pittsburgh originally on a football scholarship but excelled on the school's track team winning the NCAA outdoor national championship in the 110 meter hurdles in 1983 and the NCAA indoor national championship in the 55 meter hurdles in 1984.

He had a long and distinguished career on the track in the 110 meter high hurdles, winning his first Olympic gold medal in the 1984 Summer Olympics. In 1988, he was unbeaten all season and was the favorite to retain his Olympic title in the 1988 Summer Olympics in Seoul, South Korea. In a stunning display of technique, power, and speed, he won by three meters, becoming the first man to run below the 13 second barrier in an Olympic final, running 12.98s. This record stood until 1996 when Allen Johnson broke it at the Atlanta Games. Kingdom is only the second athlete to have successfully defended his 110 m hurdle Olympic title, after Lee Calhoun, who won the gold medal in both 1956 and 1960.

Kingdom set a 110 m high hurdles World Record of 12.92 seconds in Zürich, Switzerland in 1989. This stood until August 20, 1993, when it was beaten by 1/100 of a second by Colin Jackson of Great Britain in Stuttgart, Germany, a subsequent record that stood for 13 years.

His progress was hampered some in 1991 when he underwent surgery to repair ACL damage and remove bone chips from his knee. He returned to competition to win the gold medal in the 1995 Pan American Games and the bronze medal in the 1995 World Championships in Athletics.

Kingdom retired from active athletic competition in 1999.

In 2006, Kingdom was inducted into the Pennsylvania Sports Hall of Fame. He was inducted along with NFL's Bap Manzini and MLB's Jim Russell.

In 2018, Kingdom was included in the inaugural class of the University of Pittsburgh Pitt Athletics Hall of Fame

== Coaching ==
Kingdom joined the California University of Pennsylvania's athletics staff as an assistant Track & Field and Cross Country coach in 2004. He then became the director of both teams in 2006.

On March 6, 2014, Kingdom was hired as the assistant strength and conditioning coach for the NFL's Arizona Cardinals. Kingdom worked with head strength and conditioning coach Buddy Morris, his own strength coach at the University of Pittsburgh, and focused on improving the team's speed.

Kingdom then spent the 2018 season as the Interim Director of Track & Field/Cross Country at the University of Central Florida

In 2019, Kingdom returned to the NFL as the speed and conditioning coach of the Tampa Bay Buccaneers. In Tampa, he again worked under head coach Bruce Arians, who was the Cardinals' head coach during Kingdom's tenure in Arizona.

In 2021, Kingdom won a Super Bowl title in Super Bowl LV.

== Personal life ==
Kingdom is a member of Omega Psi Phi fraternity.

He currently resides in Orlando, Florida with his wife, Mary. They have three daughters: Jierra, Cierra and Carina.

== Achievements ==
(110 m hurdles unless stated)

- 1983
  - 1983 NCAA Outdoor Track and Field Championship
    - collegiate national champion, 13.53 sec.
  - 1983 Pan American Games - Caracas, Venezuela
    - gold medal 13.44 seconds
- 1984
  - 1984 NCAA Indoor Track and Field Championship
    - 55m hurdles collegiate national champion, 7.08 sec
  - 1984 Summer Olympics - Los Angeles, U.S.
    - gold medal 13.20 sec.
- 1988
  - 1988 Summer Olympics - Seoul, South Korea
    - gold medal 12.98 sec. OLYMPIC RECORD
- 1989
  - 1989 IAAF World Cup - Barcelona, Spain
    - gold medal 12.87 sec. Wind Aided
  - 1989 IAAF World Indoor Championships - Budapest, Hungary
    - 60 m hurdles gold medal 7.43 sec.
- 1990
  - Goodwill Games - Seattle, USA
    - gold medal 13.47 sec.
- 1995
  - 1995 World Championships in Athletics - Gothenburg, Sweden
    - bronze medal 13.19 sec.

== Awards ==
- World Athletics Awards

World Athlete of the Year (Men)：1989

== See also ==
- Olympic medalists in athletics

Records
Preceded by Renaldo Nehemiah	Men's 110 m hurdles world record holder August 16, 1989 – August 20, 1993	Succeeded by Colin Jackson
Awards
Preceded by Sergey Bubka	Men's Track & Field Athlete of the Year; 1989	Succeeded by Michael Johnson
Sporting positions
Preceded by Greg Foster; Greg Foster	Men's 110 m Hurdles Best Year Performance; 1985; 1988–1989	Succeeded by Stéphane Caristan; Colin Jackson
