= Rashid Sheban Marzouk =

Qatari sprinter

Personal information
- Nationality: Qatari
- Born: 30 January 1967 (age 59)

Sport
- Sport: Sprinting
- Event: 4 × 100 metres relay
Medal record
Men's athletics
Representing Qatar
Asian Championships
Bronze medal – third place	1989 New Delhi	4×100 m

Rashid Sheban Marzouk (born 30 January 1967) is a Qatari sprinter. He competed in the men's 4 × 100 metres relay at the 1988 Summer Olympics.
