= Stephen Kerho =

Canadian hurdler

Personal information
- Nickname: Steve
- Nationality: Canadian
- Born: March 24, 1964 (age 62) Buffalo, New York, U.S.

Sport
- Sport: Track and field
- Event: 110 metres hurdles

Stephen Kerho (born March 24, 1964) is a Canadian hurdler. He competed in the men's 110 metres hurdles at the 1988 Summer Olympics.

Kerho was an All-American hurdler for the UCLA Bruins track and field team, finishing 7th in the 110 m hurdles at the 1987 NCAA Division I outdoor track and field championships.
