= Kim Jin-tae (athlete) =

South Korean hurdler

Personal information
- Nationality: South Korean
- Born: 15 June 1964 (age 62)

Sport
- Sport: Track and field
- Event: 110 metres hurdles

Kim Jin-tae (born 15 June 1964) is a South Korean hurdler. He competed in the men's 110 metres hurdles at the 1988 Summer Olympics.
