= Line Holter =

Norwegian footballer

Personal information
- Date of birth: 25 April 1989 (age 37)
- Position: Defender

Youth career
- Stabæk
- Asker

Senior career*
Years	Team	Apps	(Gls)
2007–2008	Asker	11	(1)
2009–2010	Stabæk	24	(0)
2011–2018	Røa	135	(8)

International career
2007	Norway U19	2	(0)
2011–2012	Norway U23	9	(3)
2011	Norway	1	(0)
- * Club domestic league appearances and goals

Line Holter (born 25 April 1989) is a Norwegian footballer who spent most of her career in Toppserien club Røa, and was capped once for Norway.

She hails from Bekkestua in Bærum. She played youth football for Asker and advanced to the senior team. After the 2008 season had concluded, she was one of many teammates who supported the relocation of Asker to Stabæk, a team she also had represented as a younger player. Holter even played bandy for Stabæk, representing youth national teams in both sports.

Holter's sole senior cap for Norway came in a UEFA Women's Euro 2013 qualifying match against Belgium. Because of illness in the Norwegian squad, three players were hastily transferred from the Norway U23 squad. (This was also the debut match of Caroline Graham Hansen.)

Having joined Røa in 2011, large parts of the squad left ahead of the 2013 season, with Holter being among those who stayed. She remained in Røa until she retired after the 2018 season.
