= 2012 Sweden Invitational =

Tournament details
- Host country: Sweden
- Dates: 16–20 June
- Teams: 3 (from 3 confederations)
- Venue(s): 2 (in 2 host cities)

Final positions
- Champions: United States
- Runners-up: Japan
- Third place: Sweden

Tournament statistics
- Matches played: 3
- Goals scored: 10 (3.33 per match)
- Top scorer(s): 2 tied (3)

The 2012 Sweden Invitational was an association football tournament organized in Sweden. It was held 16–20 June 2012 and featured 3 teams: Japan, Sweden and the United States.

== Results ==
Team	Pld	W	D	L	GS	GA	GD	Pts
United States	2	2	0	0	7	2	+5	6
Japan	2	1	0	1	2	4	−2	3
Sweden	2	0	0	2	1	4	−3	0

16 June 2012

Sweden	1 – 3	United States
Schelin 35'	Report	Wambach 8'; Morgan 22'; Heath 56'

Örjans Vall, Halmstad
Attendance: 2,751
Referee: Teodora Albon (ROU)

18 June 2012

United States	4 – 1	Japan
Morgan 3', 61'; Wambach 10', 90+2'	Report	Nagasato 28'

Örjans Vall, Halmstad
Attendance: 1,309
Referee: Linn Andersson (SWE)

20 June 2012

Sweden	0 – 1	Japan
		Nagasato 28'

Rambergsvallen, Gothenburg
