= Arthur Blake (hurdler) =

American hurdler

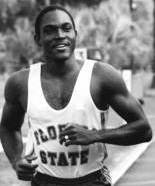
- Blake at Florida State in 1988

Personal information
- Full name: Arthur J. Blake
- Born: August 19, 1966 (age 59) Bartow, Florida, United States

Sport
- Sport: Track and field
- Event: 110 metres hurdles
Medal record
Representing United States
Summer Universiade
Silver medal – second place	1987 Zagreb	110m hurdles

Arthur J. Blake (born August 19, 1966) is an American hurdler. He competed in the 110 metres hurdles at the 1988 Summer Olympics and the 1992 Summer Olympics.
