= Derrick Knowles =

Bahamian hurdler (born 1966)

George Derek Knowles
Personal information
- Nationality: Bahamian
- Born: 22 March 1966 (age 60) Nassau Bahamas
- Height: 6.2

Sport
- Sport: Track and field
- Event: 110 metres hurdles

George Derek Knowles (born March 22, 1966) is a Bahamian hurdler. He competed in the men's 110 metres hurdles at the 1988 Summer Olympics.
