= Erik Jensen (hurdler) =

Danish hurdler

Personal information
- Nationality: Danish
- Born: 4 June 1962 (age 63)

Sport
- Sport: Track and field
- Event: 110 metres hurdles

Erik Jensen (born 4 June 1962) is a Danish hurdler. He competed in the men's 110 metres hurdles at the 1988 Summer Olympics.
