= 2012 Women's Kirin Challenge Cup =

Tournament details
- Host country: Japan
- Dates: 1 April – 5 April
- Teams: 3 (from 3 confederations)
- Venues: 3 (in 3 host cities)

Final positions
- Champions: Japan (1st title)
- Runners-up: United States
- Third place: Brazil

Tournament statistics
- Matches played: 3
- Goals scored: 10 (3.33 per match)

The 2012 Women's Kirin Challenge Cup was an association football tournament organized in Japan. It was held from 1–5 April 2012 in Japan and included 3 teams: Brazil, Japan and the United States. Japan won the tournament on goals scored after tying with the United States and beating Brazil 4–1.

== Results ==
Team	Pld	W	D	L	GS	GA	GD	Pts
Japan	2	1	1	0	5	2	+3	4
United States	2	1	1	0	4	1	+3	4
Brazil	2	0	0	2	1	7	-6	0

1 April 2012
6:30 a.m. EDT

Japan	1–1	United States
Kinga 31'	Report	Morgan 72'

Yurtec Stadium Sendai, Sendai
Attendance: 15,159
Referee: Li Juan (CHN)

3 April 2012
3:00 a.m. EDT

United States	3–0	Brazil
Lloyd 18'; Boxx 23'; Buehler (yellow card) 77'; Rodriguez 83'	Report	Ester (yellow card) 82'

Fukuda Denshi Arena, Chiba
Attendance: 500
Referee: Sachiko Yamagishi

5 April 2012

Japan	4–1	Brazil
Daiane 16' (o.g.); Nagasato 58'; Miyama 61'; Sugasawa 89'	Report	Francielle 45'

Home's Stadium, Kobe
Attendance: 12,862
