= Wu Chin-jing =

Taiwanese athlete (born 1958)

Personal information
- Nationality: Taiwanese
- Born: 吳清錦, Pinyin: Wú Qīng-jǐn; 15 May 1958 (age 68)

Sport
- Sport: Athletics
- Event: 110 m hurdles
Medal record
Men's athletics
Representing Chinese Taipei
Asian Championships
Gold medal – first place	1983 Kuwait City	110 m hurdles

Wu Chin-jing (born 15 May 1958) is a Taiwanese sprint hurdler. He competed in the men's 4 × 100 metres relay at the 1988 Summer Olympics. He won the gold medal at the 1983 Asian Championships. He also competed at the 1983 and 1987 World Championships without reaching the final.
