= João Lima (athlete) =

Portuguese hurdler (1961–2023)

Personal information
- Nationality: Portuguese
- Born: 20 September 1961 Luanda, Portuguese Angola
- Died: 18 November 2023 (aged 62)

Sport
- Sport: Track and field
- Event: 110 metres hurdles

João Lima (20 September 1961 – 18 November 2023) was a Portuguese hurdler. He competed in the men's 110 metres hurdles at the 1988 Summer Olympics. Lima died on 18 November 2023, at the age of 62.
