= Jeff Glass (athlete) =

Canadian hurdler (born 1962)

Jeff Glass (born April 21, 1962 in London, Ontario) was a Canadian professional hurdler. Glass competed in the 1984 Summer Olympics, ranking eighth in the 110 metres hurdles.
