= Jon Ridgeon =

British athlete (born 1967)

Personal information
- Born: 14 February 1967 (age 59) Bury St Edmunds, Suffolk, England

Sport
- Sport: 110m hurdles
- Club: Cambridge & Coleridge AC; Belgrave Harriers
Medal record
Men's Athletics
Representing Great Britain
World Championships
Silver medal – second place	1987 Rome	110 m hurdles
Universiade
Gold medal – first place	1987 Zagreb	110 m hurdles

Jonathan Peter Ridgeon (born 14 February 1967) is an English former athlete who competed mainly in the 110 metres hurdles and the 400 metres hurdles. In the 110m hurdles, he won the silver medal at the 1987 World Championships and the gold medal at the 1987 Universiade. He represented Great Britain at the 1988 Seoul Olympics and the 1996 Atlanta Olympics.

== Biography ==
Ridgeon was born in Bury St Edmunds, Suffolk. He won the 110 m hurdles at the European Junior Championship in 1985, ahead of his fellow British athlete Colin Jackson, who finished runner-up. Ridgeon then finished second to Jackson at the 1986 World Junior Championships. He represented England in the 110 metres hurdles event, at the 1986 Commonwealth Games in Edinburgh.

Ridgeon was an All-American for the SMU Mustangs track and field team, finishing 6th in the 110 m hurdles at the 1986 NCAA Division I Outdoor Track and Field Championships.

Ridgeon won the 110 m hurdles gold medal at the 1987 Universiade (World University Games) in Zagreb. Ridgeon became the British 110 metres hurdles metres champion after winning the British AAA Championships title at the 1987 AAA Championships.

At the 1987 World Championships in Rome, Ridgeon won a silver medal in the 110 m hurdles (with Jackson taking the bronze medal). Ridgeon then finished in fifth place at the 1988 Olympic Games in Seoul (where Jackson came second). However Ridgeon and Jackson's rivalry was comparatively short-lived, as Ridgeon began to develop injuries that led to him missing out on most major events in the following years.

When Ridgeon returned to regular competition, he switched to the 400 metres hurdles, before his retiring from the sport.

Ridgeon was educated at Magdalene College, Cambridge. In 1998 he became a founding and managing partner of Fast Track, a sports marketing agency (the agency was sold in 2007). As well as working with Fast Track, Ridgeon has also been a TV commentator for the BBC and BSkyB since retiring as an athlete.

In 2018, Ridgeon was appointed chief executive officer of the International Association of Athletics Federations (IAAF).

== Personal bests ==
- 110m H - 13.29 (Zagreb, Croatia, 15 Jul 1987)
- 400m H - 48.73 (Rieti, Italy, 6 Sep 1992)

== Achievements ==
Year	Competition	Venue	Position	Event	Notes
Representing the Great Britain / England
1985	World Indoor Games	Paris, France	3rd	60 m hurdles	7.70 sec
1985	European Junior Championships	Cottbus, Germany	1st	110 m hurdles	13.46
1986	World Junior Championships	Athens, Greece	2nd	110m hurdles	13.91 (wind: -0.8 m/s)
1986	World Junior Championships	Athens, Greece	1st	4 × 100 m relay	39.80
1986	Commonwealth Games	Edinburgh, Scotland	5th	110 m hurdles	13.76
1986	European Championships	Stuttgart, West Germany	6th	110 m hurdles	13.70 (wind: +2.0 m/s)
1987	World Student Games (Universiade)	Zagreb, Croatia	1st	110 m hurdles	13.29
1987	World Championships	Rome, Italy	2nd	110 m hurdles	13.29
1988	Olympic Games	Seoul, South Korea	5th	110 m hurdles	13.52
1992	European Indoor Championships	Genoa, Italy	4th	60 m hurdles	7.78
1992	World Cup	Havana, Cuba	2nd	400 m hurdles	49.01
1996	European Cup	Madrid, Spain	2nd	400 m hurdles	49.84
1996	Olympic Games	Atlanta, United States	semi-final	400 m hurdles	49.43
