= João Lima (footballer) =

Portuguese footballer

Personal information
- Full name: João Nuno Pinto Lima
- Date of birth: 23 June 1996 (age 30)
- Place of birth: Matosinhos, Portugal
- Height: 1.83 m (6 ft 0 in)
- Position: Defender

Team information
- Current team: Felgueiras 1932
- Number: 4

Youth career
- 2004–2011: Leixões
- 2011–2015: Benfica

Senior career*
Years	Team	Apps	(Gls)
2015–2017	Benfica B	4	(0)
2016–2017	→ União Leiria (loan)	3	(0)
2017–	Felgueiras 1932		

International career^{‡}
2013–2014	Portugal U17	9	(2)
	Portugal U18	3	(0)
2014–	Portugal U19	6	(0)
- * Club domestic league appearances and goals as of 19 December 2016 ‡ National team caps and goals as of 6 July 2016

João Nuno Pinto Lima (born 23 June 1996) is a Portuguese professional footballer who plays for Felgueiras 1932 as a defender.

== Club career ==
Born in Matosinhos, Lima debuted professionally with Benfica B in a 2015–16 Segunda Liga match against Sporting Covilhã on 20 October 2015. On 1 July 2017, he signed a two-year contract with Leixões S.C., thus returning to his local youth club.
