= Yu Zhicheng =

Chinese hurdler (born 1963)

Medal record

Men's athletics

Representing China

Asian Championships
Gold medal – first place	1985 Jakarta	110 m hurdles
Gold medal – first place	1989 New Delhi	110 m hurdles
Silver medal – second place	1983 Kuwait City	110 m hurdles
Silver medal – second place	1987 Singapore	110 m hurdles

Yu Zhicheng (born 8 July 1963) is a Chinese former hurdler who competed in the 1984 Summer Olympics and in the 1988 Summer Olympics.
