= List of Arjuna Award recipients (1970–1979) =

List of recipients of a sports honor in India

Arjuna Award
- Civilian award for outstanding individual achievements in National Sports
- Sponsored by: Govt. of India
- Established: 1961
- First award: 1961

Highlights
- Total awarded: 136

The Arjuna Award, officially known as the Arjuna Awards for Outstanding Performance in Sports and Games, is the sports honour of Republic of India. It is awarded annually by the Ministry of Youth Affairs and Sports. Before the introduction of the Rajiv Gandhi Khel Ratna in 1991–1992, the Arjuna award was the highest sporting honour of India. As of 2020, the award comprises "a bronze statuette of Arjuna, certificate, ceremonial dress, and a cash prize of ₹15 lakh (US$16,000)." (Note: The cash prize was introduced in the year 1977–1978 as a scholarship of ₹200 (US$2.10) a month for 2 years. It was revised to one time cash prize of ₹5,000 (US$53) in 1986, to ₹20,000 (US$210) in 1987, to ₹50,000 (US$530) in 1993, to ₹1.5 lakh (US$1,600) in 1998, to ₹3 lakh (US$3,200) in 2001, to ₹5 lakh (US$5,300) in 2009, and to ₹15 lakh (US$16,000) in 2020.)

== Name ==
The award is named after Arjuna, a character from the Sanskrit epic Mahabharata of ancient India. He is one of the Pandavas, depicted as a skilled archer winning the hand of Draupadi in marriage and in the Kurukshetra War, Lord Krishna becomes his charioteer teaching him the sacred knowledge of Gita. In Hindu mythology, he has been seen as a symbol of hard work, dedication and concentration.

== History ==
Instituted in 1961 to honour the outstanding sportspersons of the country, the award over the years has undergone a number of expansions, reviews, and rationalizations. The award was expanded to include all the recognised disciplines in 1977, has introduced indigenous games and physically handicapped categories in 1995 and introduced a lifetime contribution category in 1995 leading to creation of a separate Dhyan Chand Award in 2002. The latest revision in 2018 stipulates that the award is given only to the disciplines included in the events like Olympic Games, Paralympic Games, Asian Games, Commonwealth Games, World Championship and World Cup along with Cricket, Indigenous Games, and Parasports. It also recommends giving only fifteen awards in a year, relaxing in case of excellent performance in major multi-sport events, team sports, across gender and giving away of at least one award to physically challenged category.

The nominations for the award are received from all government recognised National Sports Federations, the Indian Olympic Association, the Sports Authority of India (SAI), the Sports Promotion and Control Boards, the state and the union territory governments and the Rajiv Gandhi Khel Ratna, Arjuna, Dhyan Chand and Dronacharya awardees of the previous years. The recipients are selected by a committee constituted by the Ministry and are honoured for their "good performance in the field of sports over a period of four years" at international level and for having shown "qualities of leadership, sportsmanship and a sense of discipline".

== Recipients ==
A total of 136 awards were presented in the 1970s – thirteen in 1970, followed by twelve in 1971, fourteen in 1972, seventeen in 1973, fourteen in 1974, nineteen in 1975, ten in 1976, ten in 1977–1978, sixteen in 1978–1979 and eleven in 1979–1980. Individuals from twenty-eight different sports were awarded, which includes fourteen from athletics, thirteen from hockey, nine each from cricket and volleyball, eight from weightlifting, seven each from badminton, basketball and kho kho, six each from boxing and swimming, five each from ball badminton, football, table tennis and wrestling, four from golf, three each from billiards, kabaddi, shooting and yachting, two each from bodybuilding, cycling, equestrian and lawn tennis, and one each from gymnastics, polo, powerlifting, snooker and squash.

== List of recipients ==
Award recipients by year
Year	Number of recipients
1970	13
1971	12
1972	14
1973	17
1974	14
1975	19
1976	10
1977–1978	10
1978–1979	16
1979–1980	11

Award recipients by sport
Sport	Number of recipients
Athletics	14
Badminton	7
Ball Badminton	5
Basketball	7
Billiards	3
Bodybuilding	2
Boxing	6
Cricket	9
Cycling	2
Equestrian	2
Football	5
Golf	4
Gymnastics	1
Hockey	13
Kabaddi	3
Kho kho	7
Lawn Tennis	2
Polo	1
Powerlifting	1
Shooting	3
Snooker	1
Squash	1
Swimming	6
Table Tennis	5
Volleyball	9
Weightlifting	8
Wrestling	5
Yachting	3

Key
§	Indicates Para sports

List of Arjuna award recipients, showing the year, sport, and gender
Year	Recipient	Sport	Gender
1970	S. J. Contractor	Yachting	Male
1970	Arun Kumar Dass	Weightlifting	Male
1970	Michael Ferreira	Billiards	Male
1970	Mohinder Singh Gill	Athletics	Male
1970	Gudalore Jagannath	Table Tennis	Male
1970	Sudesh Kumar	Wrestling	Male
1970	Gulam Abbas Moontasir	Basketball	Male
1970	Syed Nayeemuddin	Football	Male
1970	Sudhir B. Parab	Kho kho	Male
1970	J. Pitchayya	Ball Badminton	Male
1970	Dilip Sardesai	Cricket	Male
1970	Ajit Pal Singh	Hockey	Male
1970	Damayanti Tambay	Badminton	Female
1971	Achala Suberao Devra	Kho kho	Male
1971	Kaity Farookh Khodaiji	Table Tennis	Female
1971	Sobha Morthy	Badminton	Female
1971	Krishnamurthy Perumal	Hockey	Male
1971	Shyamlal Salwan	Weightlifting	Male
1971	Edward Sequeira	Athletics	Male
1971	Bhanwar Singh	Swimming	Male
1971	Bhim Singh	Shooting	Male
1971	C. P. Singh	Football	Male
1971	M. M. Singh	Basketball	Male
1971	Srinivasaraghavan Venkataraghavan	Cricket	Male
1971	Muniswamy Venu	Boxing	Male
1972	B. S. Chandrashekhar	Cricket	Male
1972	Vijay Singh Chauhan	Athletics	Male
1972	Udayan Chinubhai	Shooting	Male
1972	Anjani N. Desai	Golf	Female
1972	Michael Kindo	Hockey	Male
1972	Anil Kumar Mandal	Weightlifting	Male
1972	Satish Kumar Mohan	Billiards	Male
1972	Chandraya Narayanan	Boxing	Male
1972	Prem Nath	Wrestling	Male
1972	Prakash Padukone	Badminton	Male
1972	S. M. Shetty	Kabaddi	Male
1972	Balwant Singh	Volleyball	Male
1972	Eknath Solkar	Cricket	Male
1972	Jayamma Srinivasan	Ball Badminton	Female
1973	Niraj Ramkrishna Bajaj	Table Tennis	Male
1973	M. P. Ganesh	Hockey	Male
1973	Bhola Nath Guin	Kabaddi	Male
1973	Afsar Hussain	Yachting	Male
1973	A. Kareem	Ball Badminton	Male
1973	Surendra Kumar Kataria	Basketball	Male
1973	Dafadar Md. Khan	Equestrian	Male
1973	Dhanvir Khatau	Swimming	Male
1973	O. Mascarenhas	Hockey	Female
1973	B. H. Parikh	Kho kho	Female
1973	Magan Singh Rajvi	Football	Male
1973	G. Mulilini Reddy	Volleyball	Female
1973	Shyam Shroff	Billiards	Male
1973	Jagroop Singh	Wrestling	Male
1973	Mehtab Singh	Boxing	Male
1973	Sriram Singh	Athletics	Male
1973	Vikramjit Singh	Golf	Male
1974	Vijay Amritraj	Lawn Tennis	Male
1974	Manjari Bhargava	Swimming (Note: Diving)	Female
1974	Anjan Bhattacharjee	Cricket§	Male
1974	Raman Ghosh	Badminton	Male
1974	Ajinder Kaur	Hockey	Female
1974	Ashok Kumar	Hockey	Male
1974	Anil Kumar Punj	Basketball	Male
1974	Shivnath Singh Rajput	Athletics	Male
1974	M. Syamsunder Rao	Volleyball	Male
1974	Avinash B. Sarang	Swimming (Note: Long-distance swimming)	Male
1974	N. C. Sarolkar	Kho kho	Female
1974	Satpal Singh	Wrestling	Male
1974	S. Vellaiswamy	Weightlifting	Male
1974	T. C. Yohannan	Athletics	Male
1975	Devinder Ahuja	Badminton	Male
1975	V. Anusuya Bai	Athletics	Female
1975	Hari Chand	Athletics	Male
1975	Mantu Debnath	Gymnastics	Male
1975	Smita Desai	Swimming	Female
1975	K. C. Elamma	Volleyball	Female
1975	Sunil Gavaskar	Cricket	Male
1975	B. P. Govinda	Hockey	Male
1975	Shreerang J. Inamdar	Kho kho	Male
1975	L. A. Iqbal	Ball Badminton	Male
1975	S. K. Jamshed	Golf	Male
1975	Usha Vasant Nagarkar	Kho kho	Female
1975	M. S. Rana	Swimming	Male
1975	Rupa Saini	Hockey	Female
1975	Amar Singh	Cycling	Male
1975	Dalbir Singh	Weightlifting	Male
1975	Hanuman Singh	Basketball	Male
1975	Ranvir Singh	Volleyball	Male
1975	V. P. Singh	Polo	Male
1976	K. Balamuruganandam	Weightlifting	Male
1976	Bahadur Singh Chouhan	Athletics	Male
1976	A. Sam Christ Das	Ball Badminton	Male
1976	S. R. Dharwadkar	Kho kho	Male
1976	Jimmy George	Volleyball	Male
1976	Ami Ghia	Badminton	Female
1976	Shantha Rangaswamy	Cricket	Female
1976	Shailaja Salokhe	Table Tennis	Female
1976	H. S. Sodhi	Equestrian	Male
1976	Geeta Zutshi	Athletics	Female
1977–1978	Leslie Fernandez	Hockey	Female
1977–1978	Satish Kumar	Athletics§	Male
1977–1978	A. Ramana Rao	Volleyball	Male
1977–1978	Sita Rawlley	Golf	Female
1977–1978	M. T. Selvan	Weightlifting	Male
1977–1978	Harcharan Singh	Hockey	Male
1977–1978	Kanwal Thakar Singh	Badminton	Female
1977–1978	Birender Singh Thapa	Boxing	Male
1977–1978	T. Vijayaraghava	Basketball	Male
1977–1978	Gundappa Viswanath	Cricket	Male
1978–1979	Suresh Babu	Athletics	Male
1978–1979	Shubrata Dutta	Powerlifting	Male
1978–1979	Gurdev Singh Gill	Football	Male
1978–1979	Angel Mary Joseph	Athletics	Female
1978–1979	Ekambaram Karunakaran	Weightlifting	Male
1978–1979	Shernaz Kermani	Paraplegics§ (Note: Wheelchair, Javelin throw, Swimming & Table Tennis)	Female
1978–1979	S. P. Khatavkar	Kabaddi	Female
1978–1979	Kutty Krishnan	Volleyball	Male
1978–1979	C. C. Machaiah	Boxing	Male
1978–1979	Minati Mahapatra	Cycling	Female
1978–1979	Nirupama Mankad	Lawn Tennis	Female
1978–1979	S. K. Mongia	Yachting	Male
1978–1979	Monotosh Roy	Bodybuilding	Male
1978–1979	Arvind Savur	Snooker	Male
1978–1979	Rajinder Singh	Wrestling	Male
1978–1979	Randhir Singh	Shooting	Male
1979–1980	Prasun Banerjee	Football	Male
1979–1980	Vasudevan Baskaran	Hockey	Male
1979–1980	Kapil Dev	Cricket	Male
1979–1980	Ramaswamy Gnanasekaran	Athletics	Male
1979–1980	Rajkumar Manchanda	Squash	Male
1979–1980	Suresh Kumar Mishra	Volleyball	Male
1979–1980	Rekha B. Mundhphan	Hockey	Female
1979–1980	Sunil Kumar Patra	Bodybuilding	Male
1979–1980	Om Prakash	Basketball	Male
1979–1980	Indu Puri	Table Tennis	Female
1979–1980	Bakshish Singh	Boxing	Male
