= Athletics at the 1970 Asian Games =

- Dates: 10–15 December 1970

The athletics events at the 1970 Asian Games were held in Bangkok, Thailand, from 10 to 15 December.

== Medalists ==
=== Men ===
Event	Gold		Silver		Bronze	
100 m	Masahide Jinno; Japan	10.5	Anat Ratanapol; Thailand	10.5	C. Kunalan; Singapore	10.5
200 m	Anat Ratanapol; Thailand	21.1; GR	Masahide Jinno; Japan	21.5	C. Kunalan; Singapore	21.5
400 m	Yoshiharu Tomonaga; Japan	46.6 =GR	Wickremasinghe Wimaladasa; Ceylon	46.7	Sucha Singh; India	47.2
800 m	Jimmy Crampton; Burma	1:47.9; GR	Sriram Singh; India	1:48.3	Yoshitake Tsuchiya; Japan	1:48.7
1500 m	Susumu Noro; Japan	3:53.0	Muhammad Younis; Pakistan	3:53.2	Jimmy Crampton; Burma	3:53.3
5000 m	Lucien Rosa; Ceylon	14:32.2	Edward Sequeira; India	14:33.8	Yuval Wischnitzer; Israel	14:34.7
10,000 m	Lucien Rosa; Ceylon	29:55.6; GR	Kenichi Otsuki; Japan	29:56.9	Park Bong-keun; South Korea	31:43.0
110 m hurdles	Chikashi Watanabe; Japan	14.7	Roddy Lee; Republic of China	15.1	Bancha Ramaratana; Thailand	15.8
400 m hurdles	Yukitaka Shigeta; Japan	52.6	Roddy Lee; Republic of China	52.8	Norman Brinkworth; Pakistan	53.2
3000 m steeplechase	Nobuyoshi Miura; Japan	8:48.8; GR	Susumu Noro; Japan	8:50.3	Gurmej Singh; India	8:53.2
4 × 100 m relay	Thailand; Panus Ariyamongkol; Kanoksak Chaisanont; Somsak Thongsuk; Anat Ratanapol	40.4; GR	Japan; Kiyoshi Shimada; Hiromitsu Inomata; Chiaki Miyakawa; Masahide Jinno	40.7	India; O. L. Thomas; Kenneth Powell; A. P. Ramaswamy; Ramesh Tawde	40.9
4 × 400 m relay	Japan; Hiroshi Waku; Kiyoshi Shimada; Hiromitsu Inomata; Yoshiharu Tomonaga	3:10.0	India; Bhogeswar Baruah; P. C. Punappa; Sucha Singh; Ajmer Singh	3:11.9	Malaysia; Asir Victor; Hassan Osman; Jayabalan Karuppiah; Thambu Krishnan	3:13.0
Marathon	Kenji Kimihara; Japan	2:21:03; GR	Yoshiro Mifune; Japan	2:24:21	Kang Myung-kwang; South Korea	2:26:48
High jump	Teymour Ghiasi; Iran	2.06	Hidehiko Tomizawa; Japan	2.06	Bhim Singh; India	2.03
Pole vault	Kyoichiro Inoue; Japan	4.80; GR	Masanori Araya; Japan	4.60	Hong Sang-pyo; South Korea	4.30
Long jump	Shinji Ogura; Japan	7.62; GR	Hiroomi Yamada; Japan	7.52	Labh Singh; India	7.45
Triple jump	Mohinder Singh Gill; India	16.11; GR	Labh Singh; India	15.82	Tsai Teng-lung; Republic of China	15.79
Shot put	Joginder Singh; India	17.09; GR	Jalal Keshmiri; Iran	16.96	Masazumi Aoki; Japan	16.59
Discus throw	Praveen Kumar Sobti; India	52.32	Jalal Keshmiri; Iran	51.40	Toji Hayashi; Japan	48.94
Hammer throw	Shigenobu Murofushi; Japan	67.08; GR	Yoshihisa Ishida; Japan	64.34	Yousaf Malik; Pakistan	51.38
Javelin throw	Hisao Yamamoto; Japan	71.24	Park Soo-kwon; South Korea	67.98	Nashatar Singh Sidhu; Malaysia	67.34
Decathlon	Junichi Onizuka; Japan	7073	M. G. Shetty; India	6582	Wang Ying-shih; Republic of China	6556

=== Women ===
Event	Gold		Silver		Bronze	
100 m	Chi Cheng; Republic of China	11.6 =GR	Keiko Yamada; Japan	12.1	Carolina Rieuwpassa; Indonesia	12.4
200 m	Keiko Yamada; Japan	25.0	Amelita Alanes; Philippines	25.2	Carolina Rieuwpassa; Indonesia	25.4
400 m	Kamaljeet Sandhu; India	57.3	Aviva Balas; Israel	57.3	Nobuko Kawano; Japan	57.4
800 m	Hana Shezifi; Israel	2:06.5; GR	Nobuko Kawano; Japan	2:11.7	Isabel Cruz; Philippines	2:13.5
1500 m	Hana Shezifi; Israel	4:25.1; GR	Mikayo Inoue; Japan	4:40.2	Lee Chiu-hsia; Republic of China	4:41.4
100 m hurdles	Esther Shahamorov; Israel	14.0; GR	Ayako Natsume; Japan	14.0 =GR	Lin Yueh-hsiang; Republic of China	14.6
4 × 100 m relay	Japan; Keiko Yamada; Emiko Konishi; Ritsuko Sato; Keiko Tsuchida	47.2	Singapore; Glory Barnabas; Schushila Wadhumal; Maimoon Abu Bakar; Gan Bee Wah	48.0	Republic of China; Liang Su-chiao; Hung Mei-yu; Lin Chun-yu; Huang Pi-yun	48.1
High jump	Michiyo Inaoka; Japan	1.70; GR	Kumie Suzuki; Japan	1.66	Lolita Lagrosas; Philippines	1.56
Long jump	Hiroko Yamashita; Japan	6.02; GR	Esther Shahamorov; Israel	5.94	Keiko Tsuchida; Japan	5.75
Shot put	Paik Ok-ja; South Korea	14.57; GR	Satoe Matsuzaki; Japan	14.07	Yoko Saito; Japan	13.86
Discus throw	Teruko Yagishita; Japan	47.70; GR	Yoko Saito; Japan	44.42	Paik Ok-ja; South Korea	44.02
Javelin throw	Nobuko Morita; Japan	49.84; GR	Sakiko Hara; Japan	48.12	Lee Bok-soon; South Korea	43.70
Pentathlon	Esther Shahamorov; Israel	4530; GR	Lin Chun-yu; Republic of China	4382	Lolita Lagrosas; Philippines	4020

== Medal table ==
Rank	Nation	Gold	Silver	Bronze	Total
1	Japan (JPN)	19	17	6	42
2	India (IND)	4	5	5	14
3	Israel (ISR)	4	2	1	7
4	Thailand (THA)	2	1	1	4
5	Ceylon (CEY)	2	1	0	3
6	Republic of China (ROC)	1	3	5	9
7	Iran (IRN)	1	2	0	3
8	South Korea (KOR)	1	1	5	7
9	Burma (BIR)	1	0	1	2
10	Philippines (PHI)	0	1	3	4
11	Pakistan (PAK)	0	1	2	3
11	Singapore (SIN)	0	1	2	3
13	Indonesia (INA)	0	0	2	2
13	Malaysia (MAL)	0	0	2	2
Totals (14 entries)		35	35	35	105
