= List of National Sports Award recipients in athletics =

National Sports Awards in Athletics
- Various civilian awards for contributions to Sports (Individual/Team)
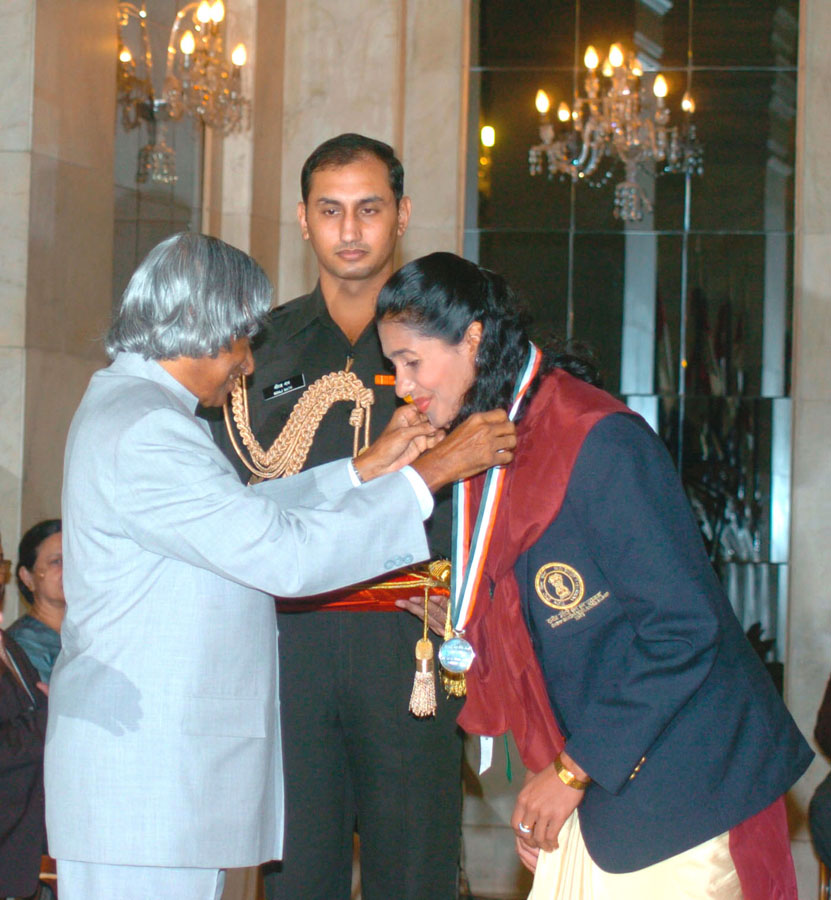
- Long jumper Anju Bobby George receives the Rajiv Gandhi Khel Ratna Award in 2004
- Awarded for: Various sports honour of India
- Sponsored by: Government of India
- Location: Rashtrapati Bhavan
- Country: Republic of India
- Presented by: President of India
- First award: 1961
- Final award: 2024

Highlights
- Total awarded: 144
- Awards: Arjuna Award; Dronacharya Award; Major Dhyan Chand Khel Ratna; Dhyan Chand Award

The National Sports Awards is the collective name given to the six sports awards of Republic of India. These are awarded annually by the Ministry of Youth Affairs and Sports. They are presented by the President of India in the same ceremony at the Rashtrapati Bhavan, usually on 29 August each year, along with the national adventure award. As of 2020, a total of 133 individuals have been awarded the various National Sports Awards in athletics. The four awards presented in athletics are the Major Dhyan Chand Khel Ratna, Arjuna Award, Dhyan Chand Award, and Dronacharya Award.

First presented in the year 1961, the Arjuna Award in athletics has been given to a total of 94 individuals for their "good performance at the international level" over the period of the previous four years, with four individuals being awarded for their lifetime contribution. First presented in the year 1985, the Dronacharya Award has been presented to a total of 24 coaches in athletics for their "outstanding work on a consistent basis and enabling sportspersons to excel in international events" over the period of last four years, with seven coaches being awarded in the lifetime contribution category. First presented in the year 1998–1999, the Rajiv Gandhi Khel Ratna, the highest sporting honour of India, has been given to a total of three sportspersons in athletics for their "most outstanding performance at the international level" over the period of last four years. The Dhyan Chand Award, the lifetime achievement sporting honour of India first presented in the year 2004 has been given to a total of 12 retired sportspersons in athletics for their "good performance at the international level and their continued contributions to the promotion of sports even after their career as a sportsperson is over". One awardee, R. Gandhi, was posthumously honoured with the Dronacharya Award in the year 2017.

== Recipients ==
As of 2020, three sportspersons in athletics have been awarded the highest sporting award, Rajiv Gandhi Khel Ratna. The first recipient was Jyotirmoyee Sikdar, a former middle-distance runner who won a gold medal in 800 metres at the 1995 Asian Athletics Championships, a bronze medal in 1500 metres at the 1998 Asian Athletics Championships, and a gold medal in both the 800 metres and 1500 metres at the 1998 Asian Games held at Bangkok. She was presented with the Arjuna Award in the year 1995 and the Rajiv Gandhi Khel Ratna award in the year 1998–1999. Sikdar was subsequently conferred with India's fourth highest civilian award, the Padma Shri, in the year 2003. She later became a politician, serving as the member of parliament representing Communist Party of India (Marxist) from the Krishnagar constituency in the 14th Lok Sabha.

The second recipient, K. M. Beenamol, came to the national limelight after qualifying for the semi finals of the women's 400 metres race at the 2000 Summer Olympics in Sydney. She won gold medals in both the women's 800 metres and the 4 × 400 metres women's relay in the 2002 Asian Games held at Busan, South Korea. She was presented with the Arjuna Award in the year 2000, the Rajiv Gandhi Khel Ratna award in the year 2002, and the Padma Shri in the year 2004.

The third recipient, Anju Bobby George, a long jumper, is India's first and only World Champion at the IAAF World Athletics Final. In 2003, she became the first Indian athlete ever to win a medal in World Athletics Championships, winning bronze. She secured fifth place in the women's long jump in the 2004 Summer Olympics held at Athens. She was presented with the Arjuna Award in the year 2002, the Rajiv Gandhi Khel Ratna award in the year 2003, and the Padma Shri in the year 2004.

Key
+ Indicates a Lifetime contribution honour	# Indicates a posthumous honour

List of National Sports award recipients, showing the year, award and gender
Year	Recipient	Award	Gender
1998–1999	Jyotirmoyee Sikdar	Rajiv Gandhi Khel Ratna	Female
2002	K. M. Beenamol	Rajiv Gandhi Khel Ratna	Female
2003	Anju Bobby George	Rajiv Gandhi Khel Ratna	Female
2021	Neeraj Chopra	Major Dhyan Chand Khel Ratna Award	Male
1961	Gurbachan Singh Randhawa	Arjuna Award	Male
1962	Tarlok Singh	Arjuna Award	Male
1963	Stephie D'Souza	Arjuna Award	Female
1964	Makhan Singh	Arjuna Award	Male
1965	Kenneth Powell	Arjuna Award	Male
1966	Bhogeswar Baruah	Arjuna Award	Male
1966	Ajmer Singh	Arjuna Award	Male
1967	Bhim Singh	Arjuna Award	Male
1967	Praveen Kumar Sobti	Arjuna Award	Male
1968	Joginder Singh	Arjuna Award	Male
1968	Manjit Walia	Arjuna Award	Female
1969	Harnek Singh	Arjuna Award	Male
1970	Mohinder Singh Gill	Arjuna Award	Male
1971	Edward Sequeira	Arjuna Award	Male
1972	Vijay Singh Chauhan	Arjuna Award	Male
1973	Sriram Singh	Arjuna Award	Male
1974	Shivnath Singh Rajput	Arjuna Award	Male
1974	T. C. Yohannan	Arjuna Award	Male
1975	V. Anusuya Bai	Arjuna Award	Female
1975	Hari Chand	Arjuna Award	Male
1976	Bahadur Singh Chouhan	Arjuna Award	Male
1976	Geeta Zutshi	Arjuna Award	Female
1978–1979	Suresh Babu	Arjuna Award	Male
1978–1979	Angel Mary Joseph	Arjuna Award	Female
1979–1980	Ramaswamy Gnanasekaran	Arjuna Award	Male
1980–1981	Gopal Saini	Arjuna Award	Male
1981	Sabir Ali	Arjuna Award	Male
1982	Charles Borromeo	Arjuna Award	Male
1982	Chand Ram	Arjuna Award	Male
1982	M. D. Valsamma	Arjuna Award	Female
1983	P. T. Usha	Arjuna Award	Female
1983	Suresh Yadav	Arjuna Award	Male
1984	Shiny Abraham	Arjuna Award	Female
1984	Raj Kumar	Arjuna Award	Male
1985	Asha Agarwal	Arjuna Award	Female
1985	Raghubir Singh Bal	Arjuna Award	Male
1985	Adille Sumariwala	Arjuna Award	Male
1986	Suman Rawat	Arjuna Award	Female
1987	Vandana Rao	Arjuna Award	Female
1987	Vandana Shanbagh	Arjuna Award	Female
1987	Bagicha Singh	Arjuna Award	Male
1987	Balwinder Singh	Arjuna Award	Male
1988	Ashwini Nachappa	Arjuna Award	Female
1989	Mercy Kuttan	Arjuna Award	Female
1990	Deena Ram	Arjuna Award	Male
1992	Bahadur Prasad	Arjuna Award	Male
1993	K. Saramma	Arjuna Award	Female
1994	Rosa Kutty	Arjuna Award	Female
1995	Jyotirmoyee Sikdar	Arjuna Award	Female
1995	Shakti Singh	Arjuna Award	Male
1996	Ajit Bhaduria	Arjuna Award	Male
1996	Padmini Thomas	Arjuna Award	Female
1997	Reeth Abraham	Arjuna Award	Female
1998	S. D. Eshan	Arjuna Award	Male
1998	Rachita Mistry	Arjuna Award	Male
1998	Sri Chand Ram	Arjuna Award	Male
1998	Neelam Jaswant Singh	Arjuna Award	Female
1998	Paramjit Singh	Arjuna Award	Male
1999	Parduman Singh Brar ^{+}	Arjuna Award	Male
1999	Gulab Chand	Arjuna Award	Male
1999	Gurmeet Kaur	Arjuna Award	Female
1999	Sunita Rani	Arjuna Award	Female
2000	K. M. Beenamol	Arjuna Award	Female
2000	Vijayamala Bhanot ^{+}	Arjuna Award	Female
2000	Rachna Govil ^{+}	Arjuna Award	Female
2000	Milkha Singh ^{+}	Arjuna Award	Male
2002	Anju Bobby George	Arjuna Award	Female
2002	Saraswati Saha	Arjuna Award	Female
2003	Soma Biswas	Arjuna Award	Female
2003	Madhuri Saxena	Arjuna Award	Female
2004	Anil Kumar Prakash	Arjuna Award	Male
2004	J. J. Shobha	Arjuna Award	Female
2005	Manjeet Kaur	Arjuna Award	Female
2006	K. M. Binu	Arjuna Award	Male
2007	Chitra Soman	Arjuna Award	Female
2009	Sinimole Paulose	Arjuna Award	Female
2010	Joseph Abraham	Arjuna Award	Male
2010	Krishna Poonia	Arjuna Award	Female
2011	Vikas Gowda	Arjuna Award	Male
2011	Preeja Sreedharan	Arjuna Award	Female
2012	Kavita Raut	Arjuna Award	Female
2012	Sudha Singh	Arjuna Award	Female
2014	Tintu Luka	Arjuna Award	Female
2015	M. R. Poovamma	Arjuna Award	Female
2016	Lalita Babar	Arjuna Award	Female
2017	Khushbir Kaur	Arjuna Award	Female
2017	Arokia Rajiv	Arjuna Award	Male
2018	Neeraj Chopra	Arjuna Award	Male
2018	Hima Das	Arjuna Award	Female
2018	Jinson Johnson	Arjuna Award	Male
2019	Muhammed Anas	Arjuna Award	Male
2019	Swapna Barman	Arjuna Award	Female
2019	Tejinder Pal Singh Toor	Arjuna Award	Male
2020	Dutee Chand	Arjuna Award	Female
2021	Arpinder Singh	Arjuna Award	Male
2022	Seema Punia	Arjuna Award	Female
2022	Eldhose Paul	Arjuna Award	Male
2022	Avinash Sable	Arjuna Award	Male
2023	Parul Chaudhary	Arjuna Award	Female
2023	M Sreeshankar	Arjuna Award	Male
2024	Jyothi Yarraji	Arjuna Award	Female
2024	Annu Rani	Arjuna Award	Female
2004	Labh Singh	Dhyan Chand Award	Male
2006	Uday K. Prabhu	Dhyan Chand Award	Male
2008	Hakam Singh	Dhyan Chand Award	Male
2009	Ishar Singh Deol	Dhyan Chand Award	Male
2010	Satish Pillai	Dhyan Chand Award	Male
2012	Jagraj Singh Mann	Dhyan Chand Award	Male
2013	Mary D'Souza Sequeira	Dhyan Chand Award	Female
2016	Sathi Geetha	Dhyan Chand Award	Female
2017	Bhupender Singh	Dhyan Chand Award	Male
2018	Bobby Aloysius	Dhyan Chand Award	Female
2020	Kuldip Singh Bhullar	Dhyan Chand Award	Male
2020	Jincy Philips	Dhyan Chand Award	Female
2022	Ashwini Akkunji	Dhyan Chand Award	Female
2024	Sucha Singh	Dhyan Chand Award	Male
2011	Kuntal Kumar Roy ^{+}	Dronacharya Award	Male
2012	Jasvinder Singh Bhatia ^{+}	Dronacharya Award	Male
2013	K. P. Thomas ^{+}	Dronacharya Award	Male
2014	N. Lingappa ^{+}	Dronacharya Award	Male
2015	Harbans Singh ^{+}	Dronacharya Award	Male
2018	V. R. Beedu ^{+}	Dronacharya Award	Male
2020	Purushotham Rai ^{+}	Dronacharya Award	Male
2021	T.P. Ouseph ^{+}	Dronacharya Award	Male
1985	O. M. Nambiar	Dronacharya Award	Male
1994	Ilyas Babar	Dronacharya Award	Male
1995	Karan Singh	Dronacharya Award	Male
1997	Joginder Singh Saini	Dronacharya Award	Male
1998	Bahadur Singh Chouhan	Dronacharya Award	Male
1998	Hargobind Singh Sandhu	Dronacharya Award	Male
1999	Kenneth Owen Bosen	Dronacharya Award	Male
2002	Renu Kohli	Dronacharya Award	Female
2002	Jaswant Singh	Dronacharya Award	Male
2003	Robert Bobby George	Dronacharya Award	Male
2006	R. D. Singh	Dronacharya Award	Male
2010	A. K. Kutty	Dronacharya Award	Male
2012	Virender Poonia	Dronacharya Award	Male
2016	Nagapuri Ramesh	Dronacharya Award	Male
2017	R. Gandhi^{#}	Dronacharya Award	Male
2018	Sukhdev Singh Pannu	Dronacharya Award	Male
2019	Mohinder Singh Dhillon	Dronacharya Award	Male
2021	Radhakrishnan Nair P	Dronacharya Award	Male
