= 1977 IAAF World Cup – Results =

These are the results of the 1977 IAAF World Cup, an international track and field sporting event sponsored by the International Association of Athletics Federations, held on 2–4 September 1977 at the Rheinstadion in Düsseldorf, West Germany.

The World Cup was contested by 309 athletes from 54 countries, and the winning teams were East Germany (men) and Europe (women).

In each event eight athletes represented eight teams:

- In men's events five teams represented continents (Africa, Americas, Asia, Europe, Oceania) and the remaining three were three national teams (East Germany, West Germany and the United States).
- In women's events West Germany team was replaced by Soviet Union

In each event athletes won points for their team, with 9 points won by gold medal winners, 7 points for silver medalists, six for bronze, and so on all the way to a single point for eighth-place finishers.

== Team results summary ==
=== Men's ===
Rank	Team	1st	2nd	3rd	4th	5th	6th	7th	8th	Points	Notes
1	East Germany	4	7	3	2	3	–	1	–	127	
2	United States	6	3	3	3	1	2	1	–	120	
3	West Germany	4	2	4	2	4	4	–	–	112	
4	Europe	1	5	3	9	1	–	–	–	111	
5	Americas	3	1	4	–	5	2	3	2	92	
6	Africa	2	2	1	2	4	2	3	2	78	
7	Oceania	–	–	2	2	–	4	5	4	48	
8	Asia	–	–	–	–	2	6	6	6	44	
Totals		20	20	20	20	20	20	19	14	732	

=== Women's ===
Rank	Team	1st	2nd	3rd	4th	5th	6th	7th	8th	Points	Notes
1	Europe	7	5	1	1	–	–	–	–	109	
2	East Germany	4	5	2	2	–	–	–	–	93	
3	Soviet Union	2	3	7	1	1	–	–	–	90	
4	United States	–	1	2	4	4	1	1	–	60	
5	Americas	–	–	2	4	4	2	–	2	56	
6	Oceania	1	–	–	1	3	4	3	2	46	
7	Africa	–	–	–	–	–	6	6	2	32	
8	Asia	–	–	–	1	2	1	4	6	30	
Totals		14	14	14	14	14	14	14	12	516	

== Men ==
=== Track ===
Events
100 m	200 m	400 m	800 m	1500 m	5000 m	10,000 m	3000 m st	110 m h	400 m h	4 × 100 m relay	4 × 400 m relay

==== Men's 100 metres ====
2 September 1977
Wind: –0.3 m/s

Rank	Athlete	Team	Time	Points	Notes
1st place, gold medalist(s)	Steve Williams (USA)	United States	10.13	9	
2nd place, silver medalist(s)	Eugen Ray (GDR)	East Germany	10.15	7	
3rd place, bronze medalist(s)	Silvio Leonard (CUB)	Americas	10.19	6	
4	Pietro Mennea (ITA)	Europe	10.37	5	
5	Werner Bastians (FRG)	West Germany	10.57	4	
6	Suchart Chairsuvaparb (THA)	Asia	10.67	3	
7	Amadou Meïté (CIV)	Africa	10.70	2	
8	Paul Narracott (AUS)	Oceania	10.71	1	

==== Men's 200 metres ====
4 September 1977
Wind: +1.0 m/s

Rank	Athlete	Team	Time	Points	Notes
1st place, gold medalist(s)	Clancy Edwards (USA)	United States	20.17	9	
2nd place, silver medalist(s)	Pietro Mennea (ITA)	Europe	20.17	7	
3rd place, bronze medalist(s)	Silvio Leonard (CUB)	Americas	20.30	6	
4	Eugen Ray (GDR)	East Germany	20.57	5	
5	Bernd Sattler (FRG)	West Germany	20.98	4	
6	Toshio Toyota (JPN)	Asia	21.24	3	
7	Georges Kablan Degnan (CIV)	Africa	21.26	2	
8	Colin McQueen (AUS)	Oceania	21.75	1	

==== Men's 400 metres ====
4 September 1977

Rank	Athlete	Team	Time	Points	Notes
1st place, gold medalist(s)	Alberto Juantorena (CUB)	Americas	45.36	9	
2nd place, silver medalist(s)	Volker Beck (GDR)	East Germany	45.50	7	
3rd place, bronze medalist(s)	Robert Taylor (USA)	United States	45.57	6	
4	Ryszard Podlas (POL)	Europe	45.60	5	
5	Franz-Peter Hofmeister (FRG)	West Germany	45.78	4	
6	Uday Krishna Prabhu (IND)	Asia	47.75	3	
	Felix Imadiyi (NGR)	Africa	DNS	–	
	Rick Mitchell (AUS)	Oceania	DNS	–	

==== Men's 800 metres ====
2 September 1977

Rank	Athlete	Team	Time	Points	Notes
1st place, gold medalist(s)	Alberto Juantorena (CUB)	Americas	1:44.04	9	
2nd place, silver medalist(s)	Mike Boit (KEN)	Africa	1:44.14	7	
3rd place, bronze medalist(s)	Willi Wülbeck (FRG)	West Germany	1:45.47	6	
4	Mark Enyeart (USA)	United States	1:45.52	5	
5	Jozef Plachý (TCH)	Europe	1:45.53	4	
6	John Higham (AUS)	Oceania	1:46.15	3	
7	Olaf Beyer (GDR)	East Germany	1:46.59	2	
8	Sriram Singh (IND)	Asia	1:47.28	1	

==== Men's 1500 metres ====
3 September 1977

Rank	Athlete	Team	Time	Points	Notes
1st place, gold medalist(s)	Steve Ovett (GBR)	Europe	3:34.45	9	
2nd place, silver medalist(s)	Thomas Wessinghage (FRG)	West Germany	3:35.98	7	
3rd place, bronze medalist(s)	Jürgen Straub (GDR)	East Germany	3:37.5	6	
4	Abderrahmane Morceli (ALG)	Africa	3:37.8	5	
5	Takashi Ishii (JPN)	Asia	3:38.2	4	
6	Dave Hill (CAN)	Americas	3:39.2	3	
7	Steve Scott (USA)	United States	3:44.0	2	
	John Walker (NZL)	Oceania	DNF	–	

==== Men's 5000 metres ====
4 September 1977

Rank	Athlete	Team	Time	Points	Notes
1st place, gold medalist(s)	Miruts Yifter (ETH)	Africa	13:13.82	9	
2nd place, silver medalist(s)	Marty Liquori (USA)	United States	13:15.06	7	
3rd place, bronze medalist(s)	David Fitzsimons (AUS)	Oceania	13:17.42	6	
4	Nick Rose (GBR)	Europe	13:20.35	5	
5	Manfred Kuschmann (GDR)	East Germany	13:24.98	4	
6	Karl Fleschen (FRG)	West Germany	13:31.7	3	
7	Hideki Kita (JPN)	Asia	13:40.4	2	
8	Domingo Tibaduiza (COL)	Americas	14:13.3	1	

==== Men's 10,000 metres ====
2 September

Rank	Athlete	Team	Time	Points	Notes
1st place, gold medalist(s)	Miruts Yifter (ETH)	Africa	28:32.3	9	
2nd place, silver medalist(s)	Jörg Peter (GDR)	East Germany	28:34.0	7	
3rd place, bronze medalist(s)	Jos Hermens (NED)	Europe	28:35.0	6	
4	Detlef Uhlemann (FRG)	West Germany	28:38.7	5	
5	Rodolfo Gómez (MEX)	Americas	28:45.5	4	
6	Frank Shorter (USA)	United States	28:52.5	3	
7	Toshiaki Kamata (JPN)	Asia	28:56.3	2	
	Chris Wardlaw (AUS)	Oceania	DNF	–	

==== Men's 3000 metres steeplechase ====
3 September 1977

Rank	Athlete	Team	Time	Points	Notes
1st place, gold medalist(s)	Michael Karst (FRG)	West Germany	8:21.60	9	
2nd place, silver medalist(s)	Eshetu Tura (ETH)	Africa	8:22.5	7	
3rd place, bronze medalist(s)	George Malley (USA)	United States	8:25.2	6	
4	Euan Robertson (NZL)	Oceania	8:25.5	5	
5	Frank Baumgartl (GDR)	East Germany	8:26.4	4	
6	Masanari Shintaku (JPN)	Asia	8:48.7	3	
7	Carlos Martinez (MEX)	Americas	8:58.7	2	
	Dan Glans (SWE)	Europe	DNF	–	

==== Men's 110 metres hurdles ====
4 September 1977
Wind: 0.0 m/s

Rank	Athlete	Team	Time	Points	Notes
1st place, gold medalist(s)	Thomas Munkelt (GDR)	East Germany	13.41	9	
2nd place, silver medalist(s)	Alejandro Casañas (CUB)	Americas	13.50	7	
3rd place, bronze medalist(s)	Charles Foster (USA)	United States	13.51	6	
4	Jan Pusty (POL)	Europe	13.66	5	
5	Godwin Obasogie (NGR)	Africa	13.95	4	
6	Dieter Gebhard (FRG)	West Germany	14.09	3	
7	Warren Parr (AUS)	Oceania	14.23	2	
8	Ishtiaq Mubarak (MAS)	Asia	14.37	1	

==== Men's 400 metres hurdles ====
2 September 1977

Rank	Athlete	Team	Time	Points	Notes
1st place, gold medalist(s)	Edwin Moses (USA)	United States	47.58	9	
2nd place, silver medalist(s)	Volker Beck (GDR)	East Germany	48.83	7	
3rd place, bronze medalist(s)	Harald Schmid (FRG)	West Germany	48.85	6	
4	Alan Pascoe (GBR)	Europe	49.73	5	
5	Peter Rwamuhanda (UGA)	Africa	50.48	4	
6	Garry Brown (AUS)	Oceania	50.89	3	
7	Dámaso Alfonso (CUB)	Americas	50.95	2	
8	Takashi Nagao (JPN)	Asia	52.10	1	

==== Men's 4 × 100 metres relay ====
3 September 1977

Rank	Athletes	Team	Time	Points	Notes
1st place, gold medalist(s)	Bill Collins (USA), Steve Riddick (USA), Cliff Wiley (USA), Steve Williams (USA)	United States	38.03	9	WR
2nd place, silver medalist(s)	Manfred Kokot (GDR), Eugen Ray (GDR), Detlef Kübeck (GDR), Alexander Thieme (GDR)	East Germany	38.57	7	
3rd place, bronze medalist(s)	Rui da Silva (BRA), Silvio Leonard (CUB), Don Quarrie (JAM), Osvaldo Lara (CUB)	Americas	38.66	6	
4	Aleksandr Aksinin (URS), Nikolay Kolesnikov (URS), Yuriy Silov (URS), Valeriy Borzov (URS)	Europe	39.05	5	
5	Werner Bastians (FRG), Bernd Sattler (FRG), Dieter Steinmann (FRG), Michael Gruse (FRG)	West Germany	39.20	4	
6	Samson Oyeledon (NGR), Théophile Nkounkou (CGO), Amadou Meïté (CIV), Momar N'Dao (SEN)	Africa	39.74	3	
7	Paul Narracott (AUS), Barry Besanko (AUS), Gary Henley-Smith (NZL), Colin McQueen (AUS)	Oceania	40.08	2	
8	Anat Ratanapol (THA), Suchart Chairsuvaparb (THA), Ok Sein-Jin (KOR), Farhan Al-Roumaihi (QAT)	Asia	41.09	1	

==== Men's 4 × 400 metres relay ====
4 September 1977

Rank	Athletes	Team	Time	Points	Notes
1st place, gold medalist(s)	Lothar Krieg (FRG), Franz-Peter Hofmeister (FRG), Harald Schmid (FRG), Bernd Herrmann (FRG)	West Germany	3:01.24	9	
2nd place, silver medalist(s)	Josip Alebić (YUG), Francis Demarthon (FRA), David Jenkins (GBR), Ryszard Podlas (POL)	Europe	3:02.47	7	
3rd place, bronze medalist(s)	Delmo da Silva (BRA), Fred Sowerby (ANT), Brian Saunders (CAN), Alberto Juantorena (CUB)	Americas	3:02.77	6	
4	Reinhard Kokot (GDR), Olaf Beyer (GDR), Gunter Arnold (GDR), Volker Beck (GDR)	East Germany	3:03.91	5	
5	Georges Kablan Degnan (CIV), Samson Kebenei (KEN), Dele Udo (NGR), Felix Imadiyi (NGR)	Africa	3:04.28	4	
6	John Higham (AUS), Rick Mitchell (AUS), Anthony Hodgins (AUS), Steve Erkkila (NZL)	Oceania	3:06.3	3	
7	Ku Boon-Chil (KOR), Mohammed-Reza Entezari (IRI), Wang Lung-Hu (TPE), Uday Krishna Prabhu (IND)	Asia	3:10.9	2	
	Stanley Vinson (USA), Thomas Andrews (USA), Edwin Moses (USA), Maxie Parks (USA)	United States	DNF		

=== Field ===
Events
High jump	Pole vault	Long jump	Triple jump	Shot put	Discus throw	Hammer throw	Javelin throw

==== Men's high jump ====
4 September 1977

Rank	Athlete	Team	Result	Points	Notes
1st place, gold medalist(s)	Rolf Beilschmidt (GDR)	East Germany	2.30	9	
2nd place, silver medalist(s)	Dwight Stones (USA)	United States	2.27	7	
3rd place, bronze medalist(s)	Jacek Wszoła (POL)	Europe	2.24	6	
4	Carlo Thränhardt (FRG)	West Germany	2.21	5	
5	Paul Ngadjadoum (CHA)	Africa	2.15	4	
6	Richard Spencer (CUB)	Americas	2.15	3	
7	Gordon Windeyer (AUS)	Oceania	2.10	2	
8	Teymour Ghiasi (IRI)	Asia	2.10	1	

==== Men's pole vault ====
3 September 1977

Rank	Athlete	Team	Result	Points	Notes
1st place, gold medalist(s)	Mike Tully (USA)	United States	5.60	9	
2nd place, silver medalist(s)	Władysław Kozakiewicz (POL)	Europe	5.55	7	
3rd place, bronze medalist(s)	Axel Weber (GDR)	East Germany	5.30	6	
4	Don Baird (AUS)	Oceania	5.20	5	
5	Itsuo Takanezawa (JPN)	Asia	5.10	4	
6	Günther Lohre (FRG)	West Germany	5.10	3	
7	Bruce Simpson (CAN)	Americas	4.90	2	
	Kaddour Rahal (ALG)	Africa	NH		

==== Men's long jump ====
2 September 1977

Rank	Athlete	Team	Result	Points	Notes
1st place, gold medalist(s)	Arnie Robinson (USA)	United States	8.19	9	
2nd place, silver medalist(s)	Hans Baumgartner (FRG)	West Germany	7.96	7	
3rd place, bronze medalist(s)	Charlton Ehizuelen (NGR)	Africa	7.89	6	
4	Nenad Stekić (YUG)	Europe	7.79	5	
5	Frank Wartenberg (GDR)	East Germany	7.79	4	
6	Junichi Usui (JPN)	Asia	7.68	3	
7	Kerry Hill (NZL)	Oceania	7.18	2	
8	David Giralt (CUB)	Americas	6.77	1	

==== Men's triple jump ====
3 September 1977

Rank	Athlete	Team	Result	Points	Notes
1st place, gold medalist(s)	João Carlos de Oliveira (BRA)	Americas	16.68	9	
2nd place, silver medalist(s)	Anatoliy Piskulin (URS)	Europe	16.61	7	
3rd place, bronze medalist(s)	Klaus Hufnagel (GDR)	East Germany	16.43	6	
4	Charlton Ehizuelen (NGR)	Africa	16.31	5	
5	Milan Tiff (USA)	United States	16.24	4	
6	Wolfgang Kolmsee (FRG)	West Germany	16.24	3	
7	Toshiaki Inoue (JPN)	Asia	15.89	2	
8	Don Commons (AUS)	Oceania	14.70	1	

==== Men's shot put ====
2 September 1977

Rank	Athlete	Team	Result	Points	Notes
1st place, gold medalist(s)	Udo Beyer (GDR)	East Germany	21.74	9	
2nd place, silver medalist(s)	Reijo Ståhlberg (FIN)	Europe	20.46	7	
3rd place, bronze medalist(s)	Ralf Reichenbach (FRG)	West Germany	19.97	6	
4	Terry Albritton (USA)	United States	19.85	5	
5	Bruno Pauletto (CAN)	Americas	18.30	4	
6	Emad Fayez (EGY)	Africa	17.46	3	
7	Bahadur Singh Chouhan (IND)	Asia	17.43	2	
8	Keith Falla (NZL)	Oceania	15.92	1	

==== Men's discus throw ====
2 September 1977

Rank	Athlete	Team	Result	Points	Notes
1st place, gold medalist(s)	Wolfgang Schmidt (GDR)	East Germany	67.14	9	
2nd place, silver medalist(s)	Mac Wilkins (USA)	United States	66.64	7	
3rd place, bronze medalist(s)	Hein-Direck Neu (FRG)	West Germany	62.64	6	
4	Markku Tuokko (FIN)	Europe	61.36	5	
5	Julián Morrinson (CUB)	Americas	58.98	4	
6	Praveen Kumar (IND)	Asia	53.24	3	
7	Robin Tait (NZL)	Oceania	52.90	2	
8	Tarwat Said (EGY)	Africa	45.12	1	

==== Men's hammer throw ====
3 September 1977

Rank	Athlete	Team	Result	Points	Notes
1st place, gold medalist(s)	Karl-Hans Riehm (FRG)	West Germany	75.64	9	
2nd place, silver medalist(s)	Jochen Sachse (GDR)	East Germany	75.40	7	
3rd place, bronze medalist(s)	Peter Farmer (AUS)	Oceania	73.92	6	
4	Yuriy Sedykh (URS)	Europe	72.20	5	
5	Scott Neilson (CAN)	Americas	67.18	4	
6	Emmitt Berry (USA)	United States	63.16	3	
7	No Kyung-yul (KOR)	Asia	57.88	2	
8	Youssef Ben Abid (TUN)	Africa	49.88	1	

==== Men's javelin throw ====
4 September 1977

Rank	Athlete	Team	Result	Points	Notes
1st place, gold medalist(s)	Michael Wessing (FRG)	West Germany	87.46	9	
2nd place, silver medalist(s)	Wolfgang Hanisch (GDR)	East Germany	84.28	7	
3rd place, bronze medalist(s)	Miklós Németh (HUN)	Europe	80.82	6	
4	Rod Ewaliko (USA)	United States	77.26	5	
5	Juan Jarvis (CUB)	Americas	77.06	4	
6	Mike O'Rourke (NZL)	Oceania	74.46	3	
7	Ali Memmi (TUN)	Africa	70.48	2	
8	Mohammed Munir (PAK)	Asia	69.54	1	

== Women ==
=== Track ===
Events
100 m	200 m	400 m	800 m	1500 m	3000 m	100 m h	4 × 100 m relay	4 × 400 m relay

==== Women's 100 metres ====
3 September 1977
Wind: 0.0 m/s

Rank	Athlete	Team	Time	Points	Notes
1st place, gold medalist(s)	Marlies Oelsner (GDR)	East Germany	11.16	9	
2nd place, silver medalist(s)	Sonia Lannaman (GBR)	Europe	11.26	7	
3rd place, bronze medalist(s)	Silvia Chivás (CUB)	Americas	11.34	6	
4	Lyudmila Storozhkova (URS)	Soviet Union	11.40	5	
5	Evelyn Ashford (USA)	United States	11.48	4	
6	Uti Ufon-Uko (NGR)	Africa	11.62	3	
7	Denise Robertson (AUS)	Oceania	11.89	2	
8	Lee Eun-Ja (KOR)	Asia	12.21	1	

==== Women's 200 metres ====
2 September 1977
Wind: –0.7 m/s

Rank	Athlete	Team	Time	Points	Notes
1st place, gold medalist(s)	Irena Szewińska (POL)	Europe	22.72	9	
2nd place, silver medalist(s)	Bärbel Eckert (GDR)	East Germany	23.02	7	
3rd place, bronze medalist(s)	Tatyana Prorochenko (URS)	Soviet Union	23.26	6	
4	Evelyn Ashford (USA)	United States	23.41	5	
5	Silvia Chivás (CUB)	Americas	23.45	4	
6	Denise Robertson (AUS)	Oceania	23.82	3	
7	Uti Ufon-Uko (NGR)	Africa	24.17	2	
8	Emiko Konishi (JPN)	Asia	25.22	1	

==== Women's 400 metres ====
4 September 1977

Rank	Athlete	Team	Time	Points	Notes
1st place, gold medalist(s)	Irena Szewińska (POL)	Europe	49.52	9	
2nd place, silver medalist(s)	Marita Koch (GDR)	East Germany	49.76	7	
3rd place, bronze medalist(s)	Marina Sidorova (URS)	Soviet Union	51.29	6	
4	Sharon Dabney (USA)	United States	51.96	5	
5	Aurelia Pentón (CUB)	Americas	52.33	4	
6	Verna Burnard (AUS)	Oceania	52.57	3	
7	Ruth Waithera (KEN)	Africa	53.90	2	
8	Than Than (MYA)	Asia	55.88	1	

==== Women's 800 metres ====
3 September 1977

Rank	Athlete	Team	Time	Points	Notes
1st place, gold medalist(s)	Totka Petrova (BUL)	Europe	1:59.20	9	
2nd place, silver medalist(s)	Christine Liebetrau (GDR)	East Germany	1:59.47	7	
3rd place, bronze medalist(s)	Svetlana Styrkina (URS)	Soviet Union	1:59.72	6	
4	Anne Mackie-Morelli (CAN)	Americas	2:02.45	5	
5	Sue Latter (USA)	United States	2:05.0	4	
6	Rose Tata (KEN)	Africa	2:07.5	3	
7	Phyllis Lazarakis (AUS)	Oceania	2:07.7	2	
8	Pazit Fabian (ISR)	Asia	2:12.9	1	

==== Women's 1500 metres ====
2 September 1977

Rank	Athlete	Team	Time	Points	Notes
1st place, gold medalist(s)	Tatyana Kazankina (URS)	Europe	4:12.74	9	
2nd place, silver medalist(s)	Francie Larrieu (USA)	United States	4:13.0	7	
3rd place, bronze medalist(s)	Ulrike Bruns (GDR)	East Germany	4:13.1	6	
4	Natalia Mărășescu (ROU)	Europe	4:13.1	5	
5	Penny Werthner (CAN)	Americas	4:14.6	4	
6	Sakina Boutamine (ALG)	Africa	4:18.5	3	
7	Junko Yoshitomi (JPN)	Asia	4:24.8	2	
8	Anne Garrett (NZL)	Oceania	4:31.5	1	

==== Women's 3000 metres ====
4 September 1977

Rank	Athlete	Team	Time	Points	Notes
1st place, gold medalist(s)	Grete Waitz (NOR)	Europe	8:43.5	9	
2nd place, silver medalist(s)	Lyudmila Bragina (URS)	Soviet Union	8:46.3	7	
3rd place, bronze medalist(s)	Jan Merrill (USA)	United States	8:46.6	6	
4	Ulrike Bruns (GDR)	East Germany	8:49.2	5	
5	Angela Cook (AUS)	Oceania	9:14.6	4	
6	Debbie Scott (CAN)	Americas	9:18.7	3	
7	Elizabeth Cheptum (KEN)	Africa	9:22.1	2	
8	Kandasamy Jayamani (SIN)	Asia	10:10.5	1	

==== Women's 100 metres hurdles ====
3 September 1977
Wind: 0.0 m/s

Rank	Athlete	Team	Time	Points	Notes
1st place, gold medalist(s)	Grażyna Rabsztyn (POL)	Europe	12.70	9	
2nd place, silver medalist(s)	Johanna Klier (GDR)	East Germany	12.86	7	
3rd place, bronze medalist(s)	Lyubov Nikitenko (URS)	Soviet Union	12.87	6	
4	Esther Rot (ISR)	Asia	13.26	5	
5	Patty Van Wolvelaere (USA)	United States	13.54	4	
6	Joanne McLeod (CAN)	Americas	14.00	3	
7	Modupe Oshikoya (NGR)	Africa	14.02	2	
8	Glynis Nunn (AUS)	Oceania	14.75	1	

==== Women's 4 × 100 metres relay ====
4 September 1977

Rank	Athletes	Team	Time	Points	Notes
1st place, gold medalist(s)	Elvira Possekel (FRG), Andrea Lynch (GBR), Annegret Richter (FRG), Sonia Lannaman (GBR)	Europe	42.51	9	
2nd place, silver medalist(s)	Monika Hamann (GDR), Romy Schneider (GDR), Ingrid Brestrich (GDR), Marlies Oelsner (GDR)	East Germany	42.65	7	
3rd place, bronze medalist(s)	Vera Anisimova (URS), Lyudmila Maslakova (URS), Marina Sidorova (URS), Lyudmila Storozhkova (URS)	Soviet Union	42.91	6	
4	Lilieth Hodges (JAM), Silvia Chivás (CUB), Patty Loverock (CAN), Jacqueline Pusey (JAM)	Americas	42.95	5	
5	Wendy Brown (NZL), Raelene Boyle (AUS), Barbara Wilson (AUS), Debbie Wells (AUS)	Oceania	44.20	4	
6	Eno Ekpo (NGR), Nzaeli Kyomo (TAN), Fatou Cissokho (SEN), Utifon Ufon Oko (NGR)	Africa	46.67	3	
7	Carolina Rieuwpassa (INA), Marina Chin Leng Sim (MAS), Emiko Konishi (JPN), Lee Eun-ja (KOR)	Asia	47.40	2	
	Renaye Bowen (USA), Pam Jiles (USA), Rosalyn Bryant (USA), Evelyn Ashford (USA)	United States	DNF		

==== Women's 4 × 400 metres relay ====
2 September 1977

Rank	Athletes	Team	Time	Points	Notes
1st place, gold medalist(s)	Bettina Popp (GDR), Barbara Krug (GDR), Christina Brehmer (GDR), Marita Koch (GDR)	East Germany	3:24.04	9	
2nd place, silver medalist(s)	Rita Bottiglieri (ITA), Donna Hartley (GBR), Dagmar Fuhrmann (FRG), Irena Szewińska (POL)	Europe	3:25.8	7	
3rd place, bronze medalist(s)	Lyudmila Aksyonova (URS), Natalya Sokolova (URS), Tatyana Prorochenko (URS), Marina Sidorova (URS)	Soviet Union	3:27.0	6	
4	Marian Fisher (AUS), Verna Burnard (AUS), Bethanie Nail (AUS), Christine Dale (AUS)	Oceania	3:30.5	5	
5	Joyce Yakubowich (CAN), Jackie Pusey (JAM), Helen Blake (JAM), Aurelia Pentón (CUB)	Americas	3:31.0	4	
6	Sharon Dabney (USA), Pam Jiles (USA), Kim Thomas (USA), Rosalyn Bryant (USA)	United States	3:33.0	3	
7	Ruth Kyalisima (UGA), Marième Boye (SEN), Tekla Chemabwai (KEN), Ruth Waithera (KEN)	Africa	3:36.3	2	
8	Lai Lee-Chiao (TPE), Keiko Nagasawa (JPN), Carolina Rieuwpassa (INA), Than Than (MYA)	Asia	3:53.8	1	

=== Field ===
Events
High jump	Long jump	Shot put	Discus throw	Javelin throw

==== Women's high jump ====
2 September 1977

Rank	Athlete	Team	Result	Points	Notes
1st place, gold medalist(s)	Rosemarie Ackermann (GDR)	East Germany	1.98	9	
2nd place, silver medalist(s)	Sara Simeoni (ITA)	Europe	1.92	7	
3rd place, bronze medalist(s)	Debbie Brill (CAN)	Americas	1.89	6	
4	Louise Ritter (USA)	United States	1.83	5	
5	Nadezhda Marinenko (URS)	Soviet Union	1.83	4	
6	Chris Annison (AUS)	Oceania	1.75	3	
7	Tamami Yagi (JPN)	Asia	1.75	2	
8	Caromella Mumbi (ZAM)	Africa	1.60	1	

==== Women's long jump ====
4 September 1977

Rank	Athlete	Team	Result	Points	Notes
1st place, gold medalist(s)	Lyn Jacenko (AUS)	Oceania	6.54	9	
2nd place, silver medalist(s)	Jarmila Nygrýnová (TCH)	Europe	6.48	7	
3rd place, bronze medalist(s)	Tatyana Skachko (URS)	Soviet Union	6.48	6	
4	Brigitte Kunzel (GDR)	East Germany	6.42	5	
5	Sumie Awara (JPN)	Asia	6.23	4	
6	Modupe Oshikoya (NGR)	Africa	6.15	3	
7	Jane Frederick (USA)	United States	6.13	2	
8	Shonel Ferguson (BAH)	Americas	6.11	1	

==== Women's shot put ====
3 September 1977

Rank	Athlete	Team	Result	Points	Notes
1st place, gold medalist(s)	Helena Fibingerová (TCH)	Europe	20.63	9	
2nd place, silver medalist(s)	Svetlana Krachevskaya (URS)	Soviet Union	20.39	7	
3rd place, bronze medalist(s)	Maren Seidler (USA)	United States	15.50	6	
4	Lucette Moreau (CAN)	Americas	15.16	5	
5	Barbara Beable (NZL)	Oceania	15.02	4	
6	Paik Ok-Ja (KOR)	Asia	14.60	3	
7	Nnenna Njoku (NGR)	Africa	12.43	2	
DSQ	Ilona Slupianek (GDR)	East Germany	20.93	0	

==== Women's discus throw ====
4 September 1977

Rank	Athlete	Team	Result	Points	Notes
1st place, gold medalist(s)	Faina Veleva (URS)	Soviet Union	68.10	9	
2nd place, silver medalist(s)	Argentina Menis (ROU)	Europe	63.38	7	
3rd place, bronze medalist(s)	Sabine Engel (GDR)	East Germany	63.12	6	
4	Lucette Moreau (CAN)	Americas	54.52	5	
5	Lynne Winbigler (USA)	United States	53.16	4	
6	Gael Mulhall (AUS)	Oceania	50.66	3	
7	Paik Ok-Ja (KOR)	Asia	45.68	2	
8	Fethia Jerbi (TUN)	Africa	44.58	1	

==== Women's javelin throw ====
2 September 1977

Rank	Athlete	Team	Result	Points	Notes
1st place, gold medalist(s)	Ruth Fuchs (GDR)	East Germany	62.36	9	
2nd place, silver medalist(s)	Nadezhda Yakubovich (URS)	Soviet Union	62.02	7	
3rd place, bronze medalist(s)	Tessa Sanderson (GBR)	Europe	60.30	6	
4	Kate Schmidt (USA)	United States	59.46	5	
5	Emiko Myokai (JPN)	Asia	55.42	4	
6	Agnès Tchuinté (CMR)	Africa	53.70	3	
7	Pam Matthews (AUS)	Oceania	51.14	2	
8	Marli dos Santos (BRA)	Americas	46.52	1	

== Sources ==
- Butler, Mark, ed. (2006). 1st IAAF/VTB Bank Continental Cup IAAF Statistics Handbook Split 2010. IAAF.
- Full results at AthleticsDB.com
