= 1975 Asian Athletics Championships =

1975 Asian Championships
- Dates: June 9-14
- Host city: Seoul, South Korea
- Venue: Dongdaemun Stadium
- Participation: at least 14 nations

The second Asian Athletics Championships were held in 1975 in Seoul, South Korea.

== Medal summary ==
=== Men ===
Event	Gold		Silver		Bronze	
100 metres (wind: -3.5 m/s)	Anat Ratanapol; Thailand	10.87	Masahide Jinno; Japan	10.90	Ramaswamy Gnanasekharan; India	11.18
200 metres	Anat Ratanapol; Thailand	21.28	Susumu Shimizu; Japan	21.66	Kazuhiko Sakuma; Japan	21.70
400 metres	Sri Ram Singh; India	47.03	Ku Boon-chil; South Korea	47.29	Yoshiharu Tomonaga; Japan	47.30
800 metres	Sri Ram Singh; India	1:47.8a	Takashi Ishii; Japan	1:48.4a	Pratap Kumar; India	1:48.5a
1500 metres	Takashi Ishii; Japan	3:48.6a	Triguna Mani Tiwari; India	3:49.4a	Tang Kuang-chia; Taiwan	3:49.5a
5000 metres	Kunimitsu Ito; Japan	14:00.8a	Shivnath Singh; India	14:01.2a	Hari Chand; India	14:02.4a
10,000 metres	Hari Chand; India	29:12.0a	Shivnath Singh; India	29:14.6a	Kenji Tajima; Japan	29:31.6a
Marathon	Sueki Tanaka; Japan	2:32:06	Susumu Sato; Japan	2:37:51	Jit Bahadur Chetri; Nepal	2:39:06
3000 metre steeplechase	Harbeil Singh; India	8:46.6a	Hitoshi Iwabuchi; Japan	8:56.6a	Noriyuki Nakamura; Japan	8:57.8a
110 metres hurdles (wind: +1.0 m/s)	Tai Shi-yan; Taiwan	14.24	Ahmad Ishtiaq Mubarak; Malaysia	14.45	Shigeo Oki; Japan	14.45
400 metres hurdles	Tai Shi-yan; Taiwan	51.15	Abdulatif Yousef Hashim; Kuwait	51.94	Akira Nishimura; Japan	52.18
4 × 100 metres relay	Japan; Kazuhiko Sakuma; Kazuo Iwamoto; Susumu Shimizu; Masahide Jinno	40.38	Singapore; Canagasabai Kunalan; Yeo Kian Chai; Godfrey Jalleh; Ong Yeok Phee	41.14	India; A.P. Ramaswamy; Sunderaraj Shetty; Leslie Louis; Ramaswamy Gnanasekharan	41.35
4 × 400 metres relay	India; Sucha Singh; Uday Krishna Prabhu; Ranjit Singh; Sriram Singh	3:08.2a	Japan; Takashi Nagao; Yoshiharu Tomonaga; Shigeki Matsueda; Toshio Mizuno	3:08.9a	Sri Lanka; Dervin Perera; Appunidage Premachandra; Bandula Jayasinghe; Wickramesinghe Wimaladasa	3:13.4a
20 kilometre road walk	Khoo Chong Beng; Malaysia	1:40:43	Baldev Singh; India	1:44:17	Nobu Nakamichi; Japan	1:45:26
High jump	Teymour Ghiassi; Iran	2.14	Yoshikazu Okuda; Japan	2.14	Takeyoshi Sawa; Japan	2.11
Pole vault	Yoshiomi Iwama; Japan	5.20	Michio Shimazu; Japan	4.80	Hong Sang-pyo; South Korea	4.20
Long jump	T.C. Yohannan; India	7.65	Kazuaki Norioka; Japan	7.49	Lee Pyong-song; South Korea	7.47
Triple jump	Toshihisa Yoshimoto; Japan	15.87	Hironobu Kobayashi; Japan	15.83	Chen Chin-long; Taiwan	15.82
Shot put	Bahadur Singh Chouhan; India	17.70	Jagraj Singh Mann; India	17.47	Yoshihisa Ishida; Japan	15.57
Discus throw	Praveen Kumar; India	54.78	Jalal Keshmiri; Iran	53.78	Kiyotaka Kawasaki; Japan	50.44
Hammer throw	Yoshihisa Ishida; Japan	62.84	Nobuyuki Ifuku; Japan	60.28	Raghubir Singh Bal; India	58.80
Javelin throw	Toshihiro Yamada; Japan	74.92	Toshiyuki Shimada; Japan	72.68	Chen Ping-huang; Taiwan	70.04
Decathlon	Suresh Babu; India	6931	Hisashi Iwai; Japan	6912	Masanori Ikuta; Japan	6816

=== Women ===
Event	Gold		Silver		Bronze	
100 metres (wind: +0.8 m/s)	Esther Rot; Israel	11.91	Carolina Rieuwpassa; Indonesia	12.09	Yukiko Osako; Japan	12.13
200 metres	Esther Rot; Israel	23.72	Yukiko Osako; Japan	24.46	Carolina Rieuwpassa; Indonesia	24.52
400 metres	Kim Kyung-Sook; North Korea	56.24	Chee Swee Lee; Singapore	56.41	Keiko Nagasawa; Japan	57.93
800 metres	Lee Chiu-Hsia; Taiwan	2:08.1a	Masae Namba; Japan	2:09.9a	Kumiko Nishi; Japan	2:10.8a
1500 metres	Lee Chiu-Hsia; Taiwan	4:23.0a	Kumiko Nishi; Japan	4:26.4a	Hana Shezifi; Israel	4:27.2a
3000 metres	Lee Chiu-Hsia; Taiwan	9:39.8a	Kwon Nam-Soon; South Korea	9:46.8a	Hana Shezifi; Israel	9:55.2a
100 metres hurdles (wind: +0.4 m/s)	Tomoko Dazai; Japan	14.25	Lin Yet-Hsiang; Taiwan	14.25	Fumiko Yamane; Japan	14.52
400 metres hurdles	Woo Seun-Sook; South Korea	62.89	Marina Chin Leng Sim; Malaysia	63.89	Ting Chun-Yi; Taiwan	64.13
4 × 100 metres relay	Japan; Michiko Morita; Yukiko Osako; Yukiko Tsubota; Keiko Yamada	46.73	South Korea "A"; Lee In-sook; Lee Kyung-ja; Kim Bong-sook; Bak Bok-seon	48.13	South Korea "B"; Kim Kyung-sook; Kim Yi-sook; Bak Im-hyang; Soon Shin-ho	48.28
4 × 400 metres relay	Japan; Noriko Kondo; Masae Namba; Keiko Yamada; Keiko Nagasawa	3:40.4a	South Korea; Kim Kyung-sook; Ra Durk-hua; Suh Yeong-hae; Lee Kab-soon	3:53.1a	Singapore; Chee Swee Lee; Glory Barnabas-Varan; Hua Kim Chew; Lee Tai Jong	3:54.0a
High jump	Hisao Tsuchiya; Japan	1.74	Michiyo Inaoka; Japan	1.74	Ruth Tslochenko; Israel	1.74
Long jump	Keiko Ogawa; Japan	6.15	Kyoko Shimizu; Japan	5.93	Lin Yet-Hsiang; Taiwan	5.82
Shot put	Paik Ok-Ja; South Korea	16.39	Chen Fu-Mei; Taiwan	13.52	Yukari Seo; Japan	13.50
Discus throw	Paik Ok-Ja; South Korea	47.74	Matsuko Takahashi; Japan	46.34	Mikiko Tokita; Japan	45.90
Javelin throw	Keiko Myogai; Japan	53.48	Naomi Shibusawa; Japan	51.40	Lee Bok-Soon; South Korea	49.48
Pentathlon	Kyoko Shimizu; Japan	4064	Ruth Tslochenko; Israel	3687	Hotsumi Harada; Japan	3667

== Medal table ==
* Host nation (South Korea)

Rank	Nation	Gold	Silver	Bronze	Total
1	Japan (JPN)	15	20	18	53
2	India (IND)	9	5	5	19
3	Taiwan (TWN)	5	2	5	12
4	South Korea (KOR)*	3	4	4	11
5	Israel (ISR)	2	1	3	6
6	Thailand (THA)	2	0	0	2
7	Malaysia (MAS)	1	2	0	3
8	Iran (IRN)	1	1	0	2
9	North Korea (PRK)	1	0	0	1
10	Singapore (SIN)	0	2	1	3
11	Indonesia (INA)	0	1	1	2
12	Kuwait (KUW)	0	1	0	1
13	Nepal (NEP)	0	0	1	1
13	Sri Lanka (SRI)	0	0	1	1
Totals (14 entries)		39	39	39	117
