= Tinu Yohannan =

Indian cricketer (born 1979)

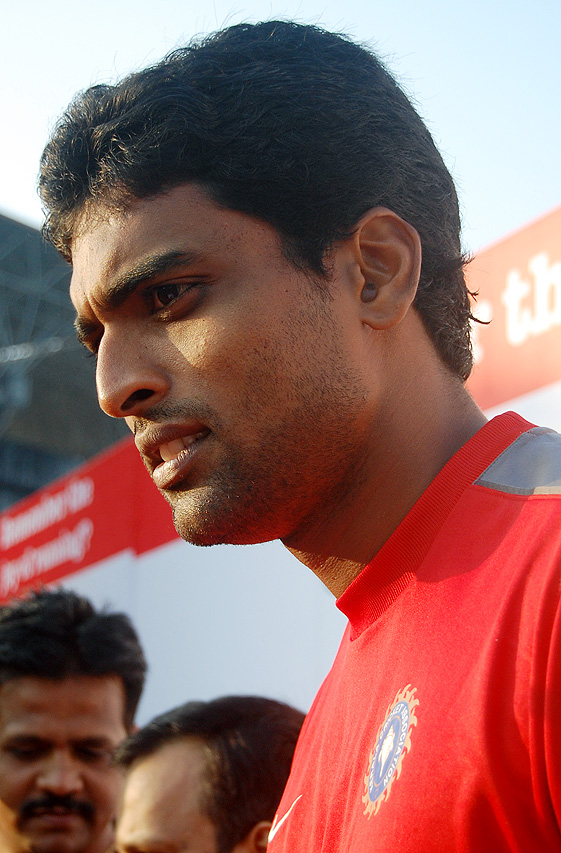

Personal information
- Born: 18 February 1979 (age 47); Kollam, Kerala, India
- Height: 192 cm (6 ft 4 in)
- Batting: Right-handed
- Bowling: Right-arm medium-fast
- Role: Bowler
- Relatives: T. C. Yohannan (father)

International information
- National side: India (2001–2002)
- Test debut (cap 242): 3 December 2001 v England
- Last Test: 19 December 2002 v New Zealand
- ODI debut (cap 145): 29 May 2002 v West Indies
- Last ODI: 11 July 2002 v Sri Lanka
- ODI shirt no.: 24

Domestic team information
- Years: Team
- 1999 – 2008: Kerala

Career statistics
Competition	Tests	ODIs	FC	LA
Matches	3	3	59	45
Runs scored	13	7	524	93
Batting average	–	–	11.64	7.75
100s/50s	0/0	0/0	0/0	0/0
Top score	8*	5*	43	13*
Balls bowled	486	120	9,404	2,302
Wickets	5	5	145	63
Bowling average	51.20	24.39	33.57	28.73
5 wickets in innings	0	0	6	0
10 wickets in match	0	0	0	0
Best bowling	2/56	3/33	6/61	3/22
Catches/stumpings	1/–	0/–	28/–	11/–
- Source: ESPNcricinfo, 4 February 2006

Tinu Yohannan (born 18 February 1979) is a former Indian cricketer. He is a right-arm medium-fast bowler. He played first-class cricket for Kerala and was the first Kerala player to play Test and one-day cricket for India. He is the current coach of Kerala cricket team.

A tall athlete, Tinu was selected in 2000 for the first intake of the National Cricket Academy in Bangalore. This was after he underwent a training session with the MRF Pace Foundation. He made his Test debut in December 2001, in the home series against England. At the first Test, in Mohali, he dismissed both the English openers. He got his first Test wicket off the fourth ball of his very first over. Though his start was brilliant, he could not carry on with the Indian team due to a form slump. He played 3 Test matches and an equal number of ODIs. His Test bowling average is 51 runs for a wicket.

Tinu is the son of T. C. Yohannan, a long jumper who held the national record for nearly 3 decades and represented India in the 1976 Summer Olympics in Montreal, Quebec, Canada.

He signed for Royal Challengers Bangalore in the 2009 edition of the Indian Premier League.

== Early life ==
Tinu not only excelled in cricket in his youth, but also won gold and silver medals in high jump events at junior state-level track and field tournaments.

== Career ==
Tinu made his entry to the Indian cricket team on 3 December 2001 on Test Match against England. His ODI debut was against West Indies on 29 May 2002 in West Indies. He has taken 5 wickets in both Test Matches and in ODIs. He has represented Kerala between 1999 and 2008.
