= Tai Shi-yan =

Taiwanese hurdler

Medal record

Men's athletics

Representing Taiwan

Asian Championships
Gold medal – first place	1975 Seoul	110 m hurdles
Gold medal – first place	1975 Seoul	400 m hurdles
Bronze medal – third place	1973 Marikina	400 m hurdles

Tai Shi-Yan (born 1951) is a retired Taiwanese hurdler.

He won the bronze medal in the 400 metres hurdles at the 1973 Asian Championships, and then the gold medal in both 400 and 110 metres hurdles at the 1975 Asian Championships.
