= Maryam Sedarati =

Iranian high jumper (born 1950)

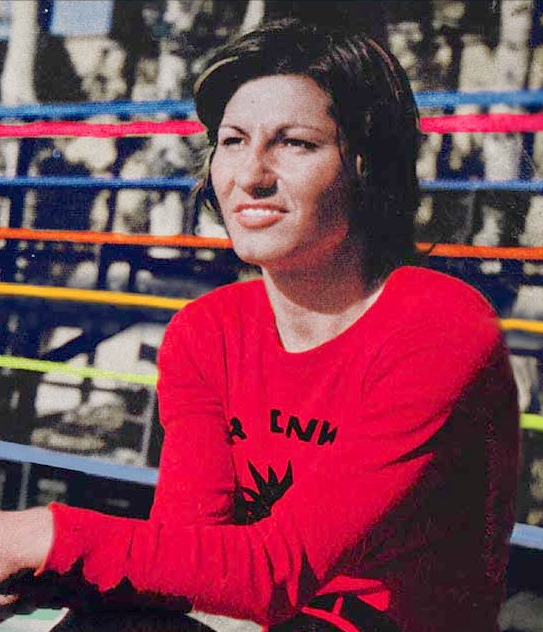
- Sedarati at the 1974 Asian Games

Personal information
- Born: 1 June 1950 (age 76) Mashhad, Iran
- Education: Alzahra University

Sport
- Sport: Athletics pentathlon
- Event: High jump

Achievements and titles
- Personal best: HJ – 1.60 m (1973)
Medal record
Women's athletics
Representing Iran
Asian Championships
Bronze medal – third place	1973 Manila	High jump

Maryam Sedarati (Persian: مریم صدارتی; born 1 June 1950) is a retired Iranian athlete. In 1973 she became the first Iranian woman to win a medal at an international athletics competition, a bronze in the high jump at the Asian Championships. Next year she placed fifth in the pentathlon at the 1974 Asian Games. Sedarati held the national high jump record from 1964 to 1996. She semi-retired from athletics between 1968 and 1973, to marry and raise her child, and then set her last national record in 1973.

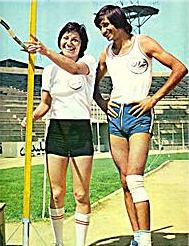
_{Maryam Sedarati and Teymour Ghiasi during a practice in the Amjadieh Stadium in 1973}
