= Sucha Singh (athlete) =

Medal record
Athletics
Representing India
Asian Games
Silver medal – second place	1974 Tehran	4 × 400 m relay
Silver medal – second place	1970 Bangkok	4 × 400 m relay
Bronze medal – third place	1970 Bangkok	400 m
Asian Championships
Gold medal – first place	1975 Manila	4×400 m

Sucha Singh is an Indian athlete. In 2025, he was awarded the Arjuna Award.

== Career ==
In the 400 meters sprint in the 1970 Asian Games, he won a bronze medal. He went on to win a silver medal at the 1974 Asian Games. He won a gold medal in the 4×400 m relay at the 1975 Asian Athletics Championships.
