= Masahide Jinno =

Japanese sprinter (born 1948)

Personal information
- Born: 7 August 1948 (age 78) Kochi Prefecture, Japan

Sport
- Sport: Track and field
Medal record
Representing Japan
Asian Games
Gold medal – first place	1970 Bangkok	100m
Silver medal – second place	1970 Bangkok	200m
Silver medal – second place	1970 Bangkok	4x100m relay
Silver medal – second place	1974 Tehran	100m
Asian Championships
Gold medal – first place	1975 Seoul	4×100 m
Silver medal – second place	1975 Seoul	100 m

Masahide Jinno (神野 正英, Jinno Masahide; born 7 August 1948) is a Japanese former sprinter who competed in the 1976 Summer Olympics.
