= Jalal Keshmiri =

Iranian athlete (1938–1999)

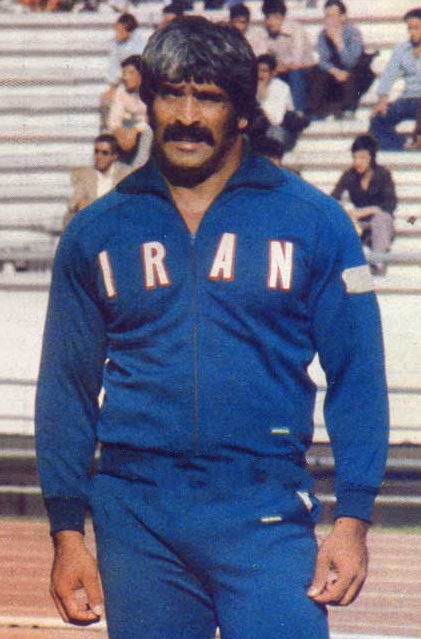
- Keshmiri in 1974

Personal information
- Born: جلال کشمیری; 25 March 1938 Tehran, Iran
- Died: 6 February 1999 (aged 60) Reno, Nevada, U.S.
- Height: 192 cm (6 ft 4 in)
- Weight: 114 kg (251 lb)

Sport
- Sport: Athletics
- Events: Discus throw, shot put

Achievements and titles
- Personal best: DT – 61.06 m (1974)
Medal record
Men's athletics
Representing Iran
Asian Games
Gold medal – first place	1974 Tehran	Shot put
Gold medal – first place	1974 Tehran	Discus throw
Silver medal – second place	1966 Bangkok	Discus throw
Silver medal – second place	1970 Bangkok	Shot put
Silver medal – second place	1970 Bangkok	Discus throw
Bronze medal – third place	1966 Bangkok	Shot put
Asian Championships
Gold medal – first place	1973 Manila	Discus throw
Silver medal – second place	1975 Seoul	Discus throw

Sayed Jalal Ali "Joe" Keshmiri Mirzamolimadail, better known as Jalal Keshmiri (Persian: جلال کشمیری, b. 25 March 1938 – d. 6 February 1999) was an Iranian shot putter and discus thrower. Between 1966 and 1974 he won two gold, three silver and one bronze medal in these events at the Asian Games. He competed in the discus throw at the 1964 and 1968 Olympics, where he placed 27th and 20th respectively.

== Biography ==
Keshmiri started as an association football goalkeeper. During one game, a practicing athlete threw a discus that almost hit Keshmiri's head. Angry Keshmiri threw it back and was noticed by the athletics coach. By the age of 19 he switched from football to athletics. In the 1970s he studied physical education at University of Nevada, United States, graduating with a bachelor's degree in 1974. By that time Iranian officials considered him an American citizen and excluded him from the 1972 Olympic team.

After moving to the United States, he went by the name Joe Keshmiri. Keshmiri at age 30 (1968) competed for Nevada college in SP and DT. Competing in the masters division, he briefly held the masters M60 world record in the shot put. He has held the M60 American record in the discus throw since 1998. He died from cancer in Reno, Nevada, aged 60.

Keshmiri married in Iran in 1965 and had two sons: Kamal (Kamy) and Jamal (Jamy). Kamy became an American discus thrower.
