= Teymour Ghiasi =

Iranian high jumper (born 1946)

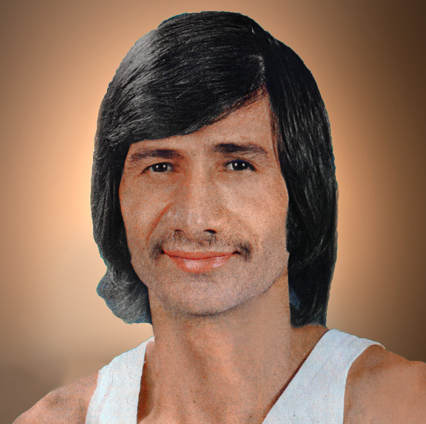
- Ghiasi in 1974

Personal information
- Born: 12 April 1946 (age 80) Dargaz, Iran
- Height: 186 cm (6 ft 1 in)
- Weight: 75 kg (165 lb)

Sport
- Sport: Athletics
- Event: High jump

Achievements and titles
- Personal best: 2.21 m (1974)
Medal record
Representing Iran
Asian Games
Gold medal – first place	1970 Bangkok	High jump
Gold medal – first place	1974 Tehran	High jump
Bronze medal – third place	1966 Bangkok	High jump
Asian Championships
Gold medal – first place	1973 Manila	High jump
Gold medal – first place	1975 Seoul	High jump

Teymour Ghiasi (Persian: تیمور غیاثی, born 12 April 1946) is a retired Iranian high jumper. He competed at the 1972 and 1976 Olympics and placed 22nd–25th. Ghiasi won gold medals at the Asian Games in 1970 and 1974, and a bronze in 1966. At the 1974 Asian Games, he set a new Asian record at 2.21 meters.

In 1967 Ghiasi married a fellow high jumper Nusrat. They have a son Alireza (born 1970) and a daughter Pantea.

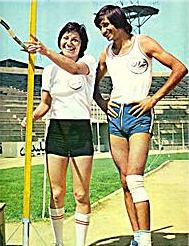
_{Teymour Ghiasi and Maryam Sedarati during a practice in the Amjadieh Stadium in 1973}
