= Hana Shezifi =

Israeli former Olympic runner (born 1944)

Hana Shezifi חנה שזיפי
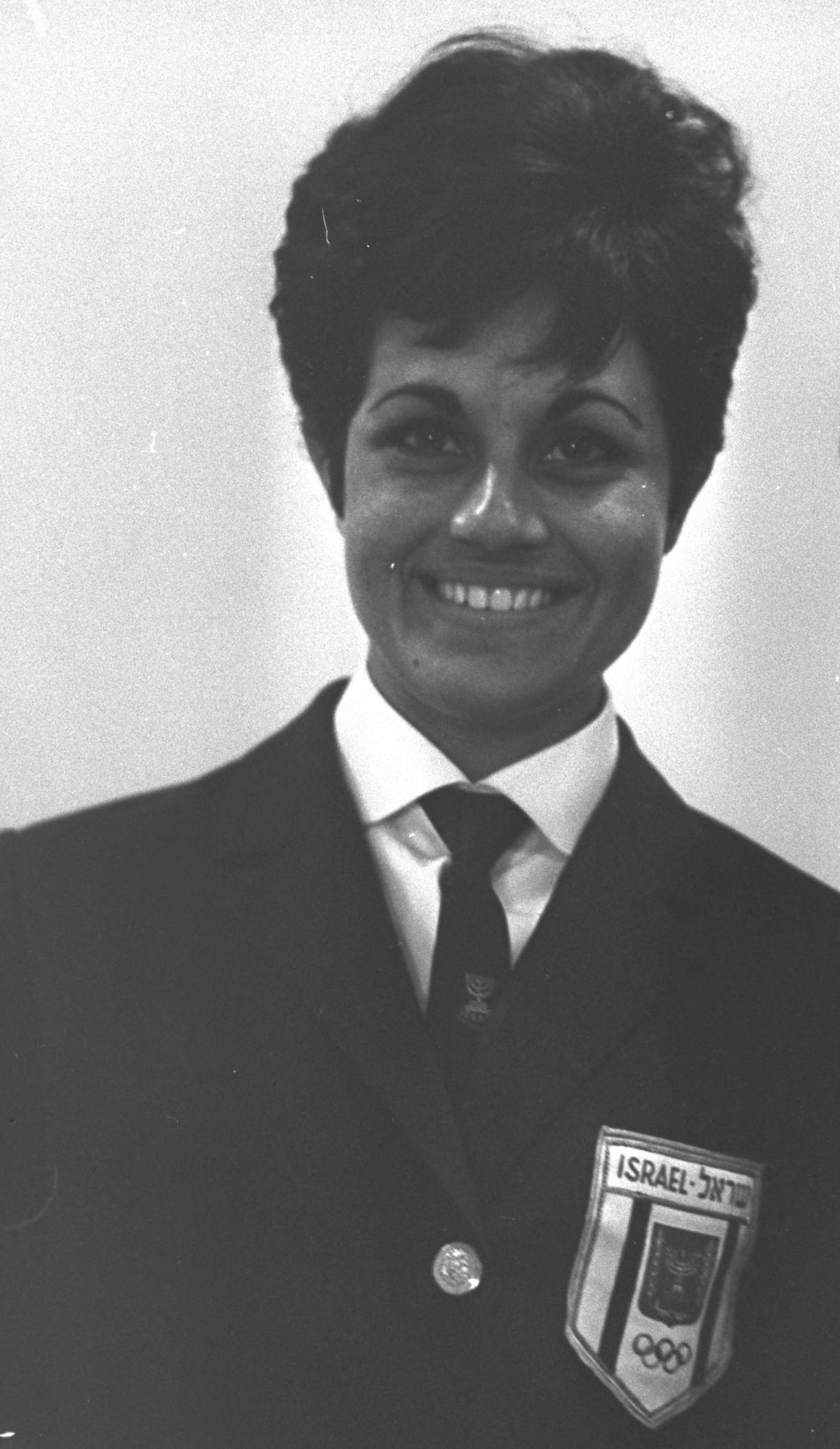
- Hanna Shezifi in 1966

Personal information
- Nationality: Israel
- Born: 4 April 1943 (age 83) Baghdad, Iraq
- Height: 5 ft 1.5 in (156 cm)
- Weight: 108 lb (49 kg)

Sport
- Country: Israel
- Sport: Athletics
- Events: 400 metres, 800 metres, 1500 metres

Achievements and titles
- Personal bests: 400 m: 56.35; 800 m: 2:06.5
Medal record
Women's athletics
Representing Israel
Asian Games
Gold medal – first place	1966 Thailand	800 m
Gold medal – first place	1970 Thailand	800 m
Gold medal – first place	1970 Thailand	1500 m
Bronze medal – third place	1974 Tehran	1500 m
Asian Championships
Bronze medal – third place	1975 Seoul	1500 m
Bronze medal – third place	1975 Seoul	3000 m

Hana Shezifi (also Channa or Hannah and Shezifi-Zadik or -Tsadik; Hebrew: חנה שזיפי; born April 4, 1944) is an Israeli former Olympic runner.

Shezifi is a former Israeli Women's Champion in the 400 metres, 800 metres, and 1500 metres, won a gold medal for Israel in the 800 metres at the 1966 Asian Games, and won gold medals for Israel in the 800 metres and the 1500 metres at the 1970 Asian Games. She was voted the 1970 Outstanding Woman Athlete by the Asian Track and Field Federation, and was voted Israel's Athlete of the Year in 1970.

== Early and personal life ==
Shezifi was born in Baghdad, Iraq, and is Jewish. She is married to Ilan Shezifi, chief tournament director for the Israel Bridge Federation, who is also a former runner.

== Track career ==
Shezifi began running with Petach Tikva Hapoel when she was 16 years old. Her personal bests were 56.35 in the 400 metre run (1968), and 2:06.5 in the 800 metre run (1970).

She was the Israeli Women's Champion in the 400 metres (1967), in the 800 metres (1961–68, 1971), and in the 1500 metres (1970). Shezifi competed for Israel in the 1965 Maccabiah Games.

She won a gold medal for Israel at the 1966 Asian Games in the 800 metres in Thailand in 2:10.5.

Shezifi competed for Israel at the 1968 Summer Olympics in Mexico City, Mexico, at the age of 24, in track. In the Women's 400 metres she came in 7th in Heat 3 with a time of 56.3, and in the Women's 800 metres she came in 6th in Heat 2 with a time of 2:09.23. When she competed in the Olympics she was 5 ft 1.5 in (156 cm) tall and weighed 108 lb (49 kg).

She won gold medals for Israel at the 1970 Asian Games in the 800 metres (2:06.5; winning by 40 metres and setting an Israeli record) and the 1500 metres (4:25) in Thailand, and Shezifi was voted the Outstanding Woman Athlete by the Asian Track and Field Federation. Shezifi was voted Israel's Athlete of the Year in 1970.

She won a bronze medal for Israel in the 1500 metres (4:31) at the 1974 Asian Games in Tehran, Iran.

She also won bronze medals in the 1500 metres and the 3000 metres at the 1975 Asian Athletics Championships held in Seoul, South Korea.

== Bridge career ==
Since 1996, Shezifi has been Chairperson of the Israeli Bridge Federation.
