= Paik Ok-ja =

South Korean shot putter

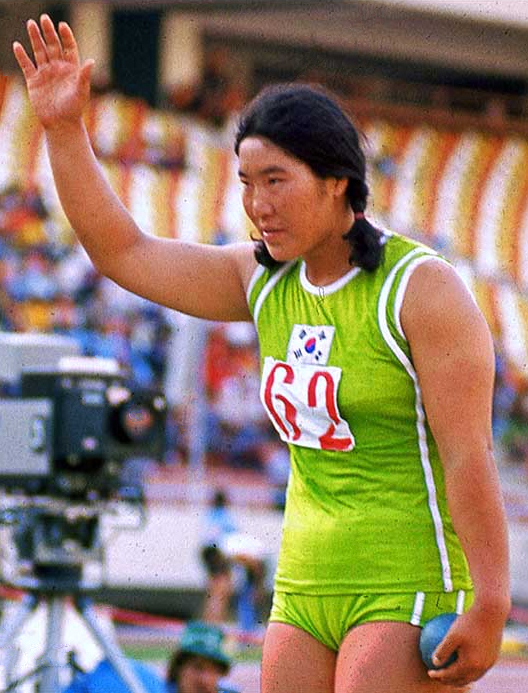
- Paik Ok-ja at the 1974 Asian Games

Personal information
- Born: May 18, 1950 (age 76) Gyeongun, South Korea
- Height: 175 cm (5 ft 9 in)
- Weight: 78 kg (172 lb)

Korean name
- Hangul: 백옥자
- RR: Baek Okja
- MR: Paek Okcha

Sport
- Sport: Athletics
- Event: Shot put

Achievements and titles
- Personal best: 16.96 m (1974)
Medal record
Women's athletics
Representing South Korea
Asian Games
| Gold medal – first place | 1970 Bangkok | Shot put |
| Gold medal – first place | 1974 Tehran | Shot put |
Asian Championships
| Gold medal – first place | 1973 Marikina | Shot put |
| Gold medal – first place | 1975 Seoul | Shot put |
| Gold medal – first place | 1975 Seoul | Discus throw |
| Bronze medal – third place | 1973 Marikina | Discus throw |

Paik Ok-ja or Baeg Ok-ja (Korean: 백옥자; born May 18, 1950) is a retired South Korean shot putter who won gold medals at the 1970 and 1974 Asian Games. She placed 13th–15th at the 1968 and 1972 Summer Olympics.
