= Anjan Bhattacharjee =

Indian cricketer (1950–2022)

Personal information
- Born: 25 December 1950; Cachar, Assam, India
- Died: 5 December 2022 (aged 71)
- Bowling: Right-arm fast-medium

Domestic team information
- Years: Team
- 1970-71 to 1972-73: Bihar

Career statistics
Competition	First-class
Matches	13
Runs scored	57
Batting average	7.12
100s/50s	0/0
Top score	13
Balls bowled	1865
Wickets	35
Bowling average	27.08
5 wickets in innings	2
10 wickets in match	1
Best bowling	7/10
Catches/stumpings	5/–
- Source: ESPNcricinfo, 19 November 2017

Anjan Bhattacharjee (25 December 1950 – 5 December 2022) was a cricketer who played first-class cricket for Bihar from 1970 to 1972. He was deaf.

Bhattacharjee was born in Kushiarkul village of Jalalpur Tea Garden in Cachar district, Assam, India.

Bhattacharjee made his first-class debut against Orissa in the Ranji Trophy in December 1970. He took 6 for 26 in the first innings as Orissa were dismissed for 81. P. N. Sundaresan, writing in Wisden, described him as "[playing] the game with great zest and never [sparing] himself whether bowling or fielding".

In the first match of the 1971–72 season Bhattacharjee took 3 for 54 and 7 for 10 against Assam, dismissing them for 32 in the second innings, when they batted two men short. In each of his first two seasons Bihar progressed to the Ranji Trophy quarter-finals. He was less successful in 1972–73, which was his last first-class season.

Although he was no longer playing first-class cricket, Bhattacharjee received the Arjuna Award in 1974, thus becoming the first cricketer of Bengali descent to receive the award. He captained the Indian deaf team against Australia in 1978 and 1985 and against Pakistan in 1982. He later served as President of the Asia Deaf Cricket Federation.

Bhattacharjee died on 5 December 2022, aged 71.
