= Lee Chiu-hsia =

Taiwanese middle-distance runner

Personal information
- Nationality: Taiwanese
- Born: 李 秋霞, Pinyin: Lǐ Qiū-xiá; 23 October 1950 (age 75)

Sport
- Sport: Middle-distance running
- Event: 800 metres
Medal record
Women's athletics
Representing Taiwan
Asian Championships
Gold medal – first place	1975 Seoul	800 m
Gold medal – first place	1975 Seoul	1500 m
Gold medal – first place	1975 Seoul	3000 m
Silver medal – second place	1973 Marikina	1500 m
Bronze medal – third place	1973 Marikina	4×400 m

Lee Chiu-hsia (born 23 October 1950) is a Taiwanese middle-distance runner. She competed in the women's 800 metres at the 1972 Summer Olympics.
