= Suresh Babu (long jumper) =

Indian long jumper (1953–2011)

Personal information
- Born: 10 February 1953 Kollam, India
- Died: 19 February 2011 (aged 58) Ranchi, India

Sport
- Sport: Track and field
Medal record
Representing India
Commonwealth Games
Bronze medal – third place	1978 Edmonon	Long jump
Asian Games
Gold medal – first place	1978 Bangkok	Long jump
Bronze medal – third place	1974 Tehran	Decathlon
Asian Championships
Gold medal – first place	1975 Seoul	Decathlon
Silver medal – second place	1979 Tokyo	Long jump

Suresh Babu (10 February 1953 – 19 February 2011) was an Indian long jumper from Kerala who had held the national titles in the long, triple, and high jump events, in addition to the decathlon. Suresh Babu dominated the scene between 1972 and 1979, winning national titles in the jumps and decathlon and at the same time picking his event for laurels on the international arena. He was one of the athletes to win medals in two events in successive Asian Games, the bronze in the decathlon in the Tehran Asian Games in 1974 and a gold in the long jump in the Bangkok Asian Games, 1978.

Babu died on 19 February 2011 in Ranchi while attending the 2011 National Games of India.

== Early life ==
Born in Kollam in Kerala on 10 February 1953, Suresh Babu was a science graduate who was good in athletics. He excelled as an athlete in Infant Jesus High School and the Fatima Mata College in Kollam. His first appearance at the national level was as a junior at Jalandhar in 1969. Three years later he won the national championship in high jump, a title he was to claim for six more years. Switching from one pit to another, he won the national championship in long jump during the years 1974, 1977 and 1979 and the triple jump in 1974, 1976 and 1978. In between he strayed over to the ten card event of decathlon and imposed himself on the national scene in the championships held in 1974, 1975 and 1978.

== International career ==
The Munich Olympics of 1972 he had his first exposure of international athletics, but it was in the Tehran Asian Games in 1974 he won his first medal. This was a Bronze in the decathlon. He won gold medal in the Asian Championships at Seoul the following year. In between he was the captain of the Indian University's athletics team during the World Universities Games at Moscow in 1973.

Suresh Babu led the Indian athletics team to the 1978 Commonwealth Games at Edmonton in Canada and won a bronze medal for long jump. He then went on to win the gold medal at the 1978 Asian Games in Bangkok, His winning effort of 7.85 metres was far short of T. C. Yohannan's 8.07 metres of the earlier Games. His next target was the 1979 Asian Athletics Meet in Tokyo where he won a silver medal, During his seven years as an active athlete Suresh Babu also won medals for India at competitions in Ceylon, Lahore and the Philippines and was the captain of the Indian team for the World Athletics Meet at Montreal in 1979.

== In retirement from athletics ==
Suresh was employed as a Sports Officer with Kerala Sports Council, Suresh Babu had earlier served as Special Officer for Sports and Games, on the Kerala State Electricity Board. He was a member of the Technical Committee of the All India Electricity Sports Control Board and a coach at the Sports Authority of India (Southern Centre) in Bangalore. He was the State Supervisor of SAI for Kerala and Lakshadweep.

== Awards and honors ==
- Recipient of Arjuna Award, 1978–79
