= Michiyo Inaoka =

Japanese high jumper

Personal information
- Nationality: Japanese
- Born: 28 November 1950 (age 75)

Sport
- Sport: Athletics
- Event: High jump
Medal record
Women's athletics
Representing Japan
Asian Championships
Silver medal – second place	1975 Seoul	High jump

Michiyo Inaoka (稲岡 美千代, Inaoka Michiyo; born 28 November 1950) is a Japanese athlete. She competed in the women's high jump at the 1972 Summer Olympics.

== See also ==
- List of Asian Games medalists in athletics
