= Anat Ratanapol =

Thai sprinter (born 1947)

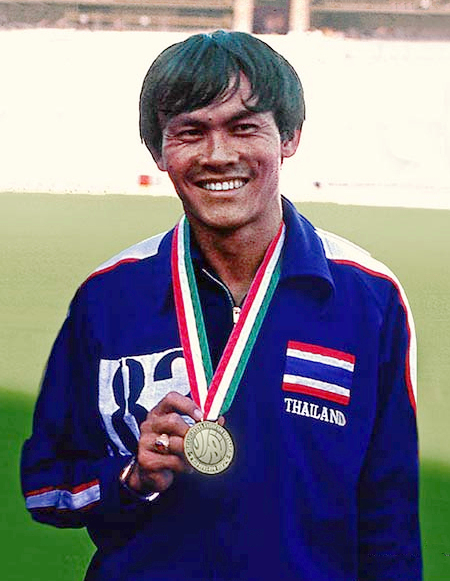
- Ratanapol at the 1974 Asian Games

Personal information
- Born: 13 September 1947 (age 78)
- Height: 163 cm (5 ft 4 in)
- Weight: 59 kg (130 lb)

Sport
- Sport: Athletics
- Events: 100 m, 200 m

Achievements and titles
- Personal bests: 100 m – 10.1 (1972); 200 m – 20.8 (1973)
Medal record
Men's athletics
Representing Thailand
Asian Games
Gold medal – first place	1970 Bangkok	4×100 m
Gold medal – first place	1970 Bangkok	200 m
Silver medal – second place	1970 Bangkok	100 m
Gold medal – first place	1974 Tehran	4×100 m
Gold medal – first place	1974 Tehran	200 m
Gold medal – first place	1974 Tehran	100 m
Gold medal – first place	1978 Bangkok	4×100 m
Bronze medal – third place	1978 Bangkok	200 m
Asian Championships
Gold medal – first place	1973 Marikina	100 m
Gold medal – first place	1973 Marikina	200 m
Gold medal – first place	1975 Seoul	100 m
Gold medal – first place	1975 Seoul	200 m
Silver medal – second place	1973 Marikina	4×100 m
Silver medal – second place	1979 Tokyo	4×100 m

Anat Ratanapol (Thai: อาณัติ รัตนพล; born 13 September 1947) is a retired Thai sprinter. Between 1970 and 1978, he won two relay and seven individual gold medals at the Asian Games and Asian Athletics Championships, typically medalling in all three of his events at each competition: 100 m, 200 m, and 4×100 m relay. He retired in 1979 after placing fourth in the 100 m at the Asian Championships. He competed at the 1972 and 1976 Olympics, but failed to reach the finals.
