= Wickremasinghe Wimaladasa =

Sri Lankan sprinter (born 1943)

Medal record

Men's athletics

Representing Sri Lanka

Asian Championships
| Bronze medal – third place | 1975 Seoul | 4×400 m |

Deshabandu Wickramesinghe Wimaladasa (born 29 August 1943) is a Sri Lankan former sprinter who competed in the 1972 Summer Olympics. He won two gold medals at the 1974 Asian Games held in Tehran, Iran, in the men's 400m and 4 × 400 m relay events.

Wimaladasa received his education at Nugawela Salvation Army Primary School and Alawwa Central, where he took part in athletics at school and district level. He enlisted in the Ceylon Army in 1963 and was attached to the 1st Battalion, Gemunu Watch. In 1964, he became the champion of 100 metres and 200 metres in the inter-regiment athletic meet and in 1965 set a 100 meters new national record. Following his gold medal in Tehran, he was promoted to the rank of sergeant and later commissioned an officer. He retired from the Sri Lanka Army in 1998 as a colonel. In 1987, the Government of Sri Lanka conferred the honor Deshabandu.
