= Felix Imadiyi =

Nigerian sprinter

Personal information
- Nationality: Nigerian
- Born: 25 May 1958 (age 68)

Sport
- Sport: Sprinting
- Event: 4 × 400 metres relay

Felix Imadiyi (born 25 May 1958) is a Nigerian former sprinter. He competed in the men's 4 × 400 metres relay at the 1980 Summer Olympics.

Imadiyi first attended Essex County College in Newark, New Jersey, where he competed for the Essex Wolverines. He was an All-American sprinter for the Arizona Wildcats track and field team, placing 6th in the 4 × 400 meters relay at the 1981 NCAA Division I Outdoor Track and Field Championships.
