= Yoshihisa Ishida =

Japanese hammer thrower and shot putter

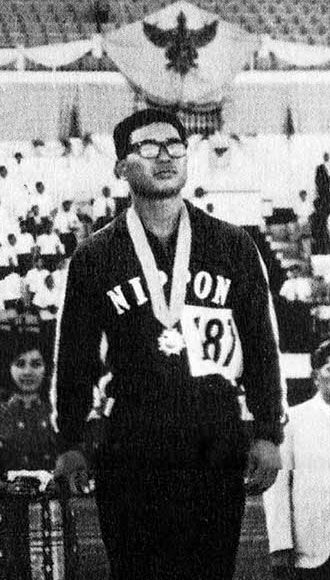
- Ishida at the 1966 Asian Games

Personal information
- Born: May 19, 1944 (age 82) Mihara, Hiroshima, Japan
- Height: 178 cm (5 ft 10 in)
- Weight: 95 kg (209 lb)

Sport
- Sport: Athletics
- Event(s): Hammer throw, shot put

Achievements and titles
- Personal best: HT – 70.54 m (1972)
Medal record
Men's athletics
Representing Japan
Asian Games
Silver medal – second place	1966 Bangkok	Shot put
Silver medal – second place	1970 Bangkok	Hammer throw
Asian Championships
Gold medal – first place	1975 Seoul	Hammer throw
Bronze medal – third place	1975 Seoul	Shot put
Summer Universiade
Gold medal – first place	1967 Tokyo	Hammer throw

Yoshihisa Ishida (石田 義久, Ishida Yoshihisa; born May 19, 1944) is a retired shot putter and hammer thrower from Japan, who won a silver medal in each event at the Asian Games. He competed in the hammer throw at the 1968 and 1972 Olympics and placed 13th and 25th, respectively. He also won two medals at the 1975 Asian Championships and the gold medal at the 1967 Summer Universiade.

Ishida twice finished on the podium at the British AAA Championships in the hammer throw event at the 1968 AAA Championships and 1970 AAA Championships.
