= Hari Chand =

Indian long-distance runner (1953–2022)

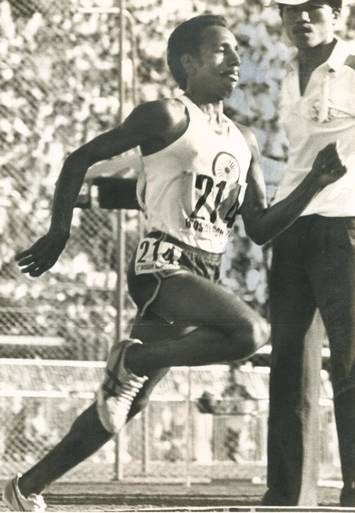
- Hari Chand Indian 2-time Olympian

Medal record

Men's athletics

Representing India

Asian Championships
Gold medal – first place	1975 Seoul	10,000 m
Bronze medal – third place	1975 Seoul	5000 m

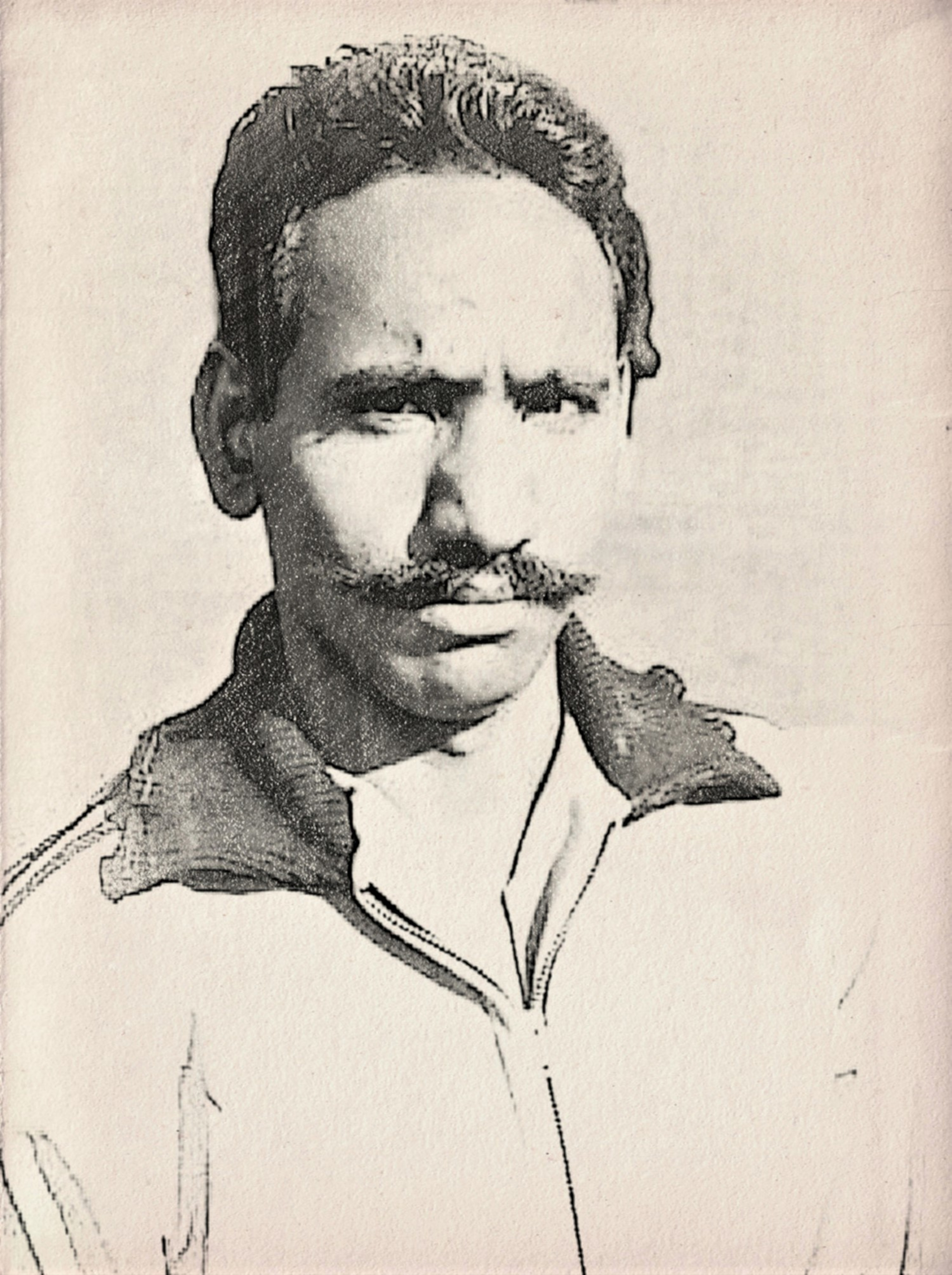
Hari Chand (1 April 1953 – 13 June 2022).

Hari Chand (1 April 1953 – 13 June 2022) was an Indian long-distance runner. He competed at the 1976 Summer Olympics and 1980 Summer Olympics, and held the national record in the 10,000 metres for 32 years.

== Early life ==
Hari Chand was born on 1 April 1953 in the village of Chorewala in the Hoshiarpur district of Punjab in a Rajput family. Coming from a poor background, he was unable to study beyond the eighth grade. Deprived of high school or university education, he initially showcased his running ability at local rural melas (fairs), consistently outdistancing competitors. To earn a livelihood and pursue athletics, he sought employment in the police force. In July 1972, he joined the Central Reserve Police Force (CRPF) as a Havildar after officers relaxed standard recruitment requirements in recognition of his athletic potential.

== Career ==
After a year and a half in the CRPF, Chand made his major athletic debut at the 23rd All-India Police Games in Jaipur in February 1974. He set a new meet record in the 10,000 metres with a time of 30:41, breaking the previous mark of 31:06.2 set by Didar Singh of the BSF, and finished third in the 5,000 metres. In November 1974, he was named the best athlete at the CRPF Inter-Range Athletics meet and received an on-track promotion to Sub-Inspector for breaking the All-India Police Games records in both the 5,000 and 10,000 metres. He continued his dominance at the 24th All-India Police Games in Jalandhar in early 1975, sweeping gold in the 1,500, 5,000, and 10,000 metres events.

Chand and his contemporary Shivnath Singh developed a healthy rivalry that bolstered Indian long-distance running. In June 1975, Chand won gold in the 10,000 metres at the Second Asian Amateur Athletic Championship in Seoul. He finished the race in 29:12.0, defeating Singh, who took silver. Chand's time shattered the previous Asian Games record (set by Lucian Rosa in 1970) by 43.6 seconds, and the meet record (set by Ichio Sato in 1973) by 42.3 seconds. At the same meet, he also earned a bronze in the 5,000 metres. His Seoul victory earned him a promotion to the rank of Inspector in the CRPF, effective from the date of his record-setting race. Shortly after, on 22 June 1975, he secured another gold medal in the 10,000 metres at the Open Invitational Track and Field Championships in Manila. He was awarded the Arjuna Award for athletics in 1975.

In the 1976 Summer Olympics in Montreal, he ran barefoot and came eighth in the heats of the 10,000 metre run with a time of 28:48.7. This was a national record for an Indian athlete and was only beaten 32 years later by Surendra Singh.

In the 1980 Summer Olympics in Moscow he came 10th in the heats of the 10,000 meter run. He also came 22nd in the 1980 Olympic Men's Marathon.

== International competitions ==
Year	Competition	Venue	Position	Notes
Representing India
1975	Asian Championships	Seoul, South Korea	3rd	5,000 m
1975	Asian Championships	Seoul, South Korea	1st	10,000 m
1976	Olympic Games	Montreal, Quebec, Canada	-	10,000 m
1978	Asian Games	Bangkok, Thailand	1st	5,000 m
1978	Asian Games	Bangkok, Thailand	1st	10,000 m
1980	Olympic Games	Moscow, Soviet Union	22nd	Marathon
