= Yoshiharu Tomonaga =

Japanese sprinter (born 1950)

Personal information
- Born: 18 February 1950 (age 76)

Sport
- Country: Japan
- Sport: Track and field
- Event: Sprinting
Medal record
Men's athletics
Representing Japan
Asian Championships
Gold medal – first place	1973 Marikina	400 m
Gold medal – first place	1973 Marikina	4×100 m
Gold medal – first place	1973 Marikina	4×400 m
Silver medal – second place	1975 Seoul	4×400 m
Bronze medal – third place	1975 Seoul	400 m

Yoshiharu Tomonaga (友永 義治, Tomonaga Yoshiharu; born 18 February 1950) is a Japanese former sprinter who competed in the 1972 Summer Olympics.
