= C. Kunalan =

Former Singaporean sprinter, footballer and educator

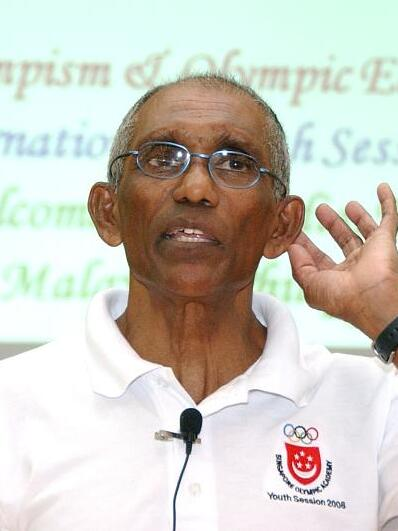
- Kunalan at a Singapore Olympic Academy Youth Session, 2008.

Personal information
- Full name: Canagasabai Kunalan
- Nationality: Singapore
- Born: 23 October 1942 (age 83) Singapore
- Years active: 1963–1979

Sport
- Country: Malaysia; Singapore
- Sport: Athletics
- Events: Sprinting; Relay
- Coached by: Tan Eng Yoon; Yap Boon Chuan
- Retired: 1979
Medal record
Men's athletics
Representing Singapore
Asian Championships
Silver medal – second place	1975 Seoul	4×100 m
Bronze medal – third place	1973 Marikina	4×400 m

Canagasabai Kunalan (born 23 October 1942), known as C. Kunalan, is a retired Singaporean sprinter, relay runner, former footballer and educator, widely regarded as one of Singapore's greatest ever athletes. Named Sportsman of the Year in both 1968 and 1969, his feat of 10.38 seconds in the 1968 Mexico City Olympic Games 100 metres was a national record that stood for 33 years.

== Career ==
=== Runner ===
Kunalan first came into running in 1963, at the age of 20. Formerly a football player, Kunalan switched to running when his PE teacher commended him for his fast-moving legs after noticing him running while chasing the ball. He participated in the 1964 Summer Olympics as part of the Malaysian 4 × 100 m relay team with Malaysian sprint legend Mani Jegathesan, and subsequently represented Singapore after it left the federation.

Kunalan has participated in two Olympic Games (Tokyo, 1964 and Mexico City, 1968) and has earned five Asian Games and fifteen Southeast Asian Peninsular Games medals.

He had to retire in 1979 due to a heel injury.

=== Educator ===
C Kunalan taught six years in Tiong Bahru Primary School and thirteen years in Dunearn Secondary Technical School before joining the National Institute of Education in 1980. Kunalan became an assistant professor there. He specialized in functional anatomy and exercise physiology, and conducted practical classes in fitness and conditioning. Kunalan left the institute in 2010.

He was awarded the Meritorious Service Medal in 2015 as part of the National Day Awards.

=== Singapore Athletic Association ===
He also serves as Vice Principal (Training and Selection) with the Singapore Athletic Association.

=== SYOGOC ===
Kunalan was one of the 23 members of the Singapore Youth Olympic Games Organising Committee (SYOGOC).

== Personal life ==
Kunalan is married to fellow national sprinter and teacher, Chong Yoong Yin, since 1966. Kunalan is a member of the Church of Jesus Christ of Latter-day Saints.
