= Esther Roth-Shahamorov =

Israeli track and field athlete (born 1952)

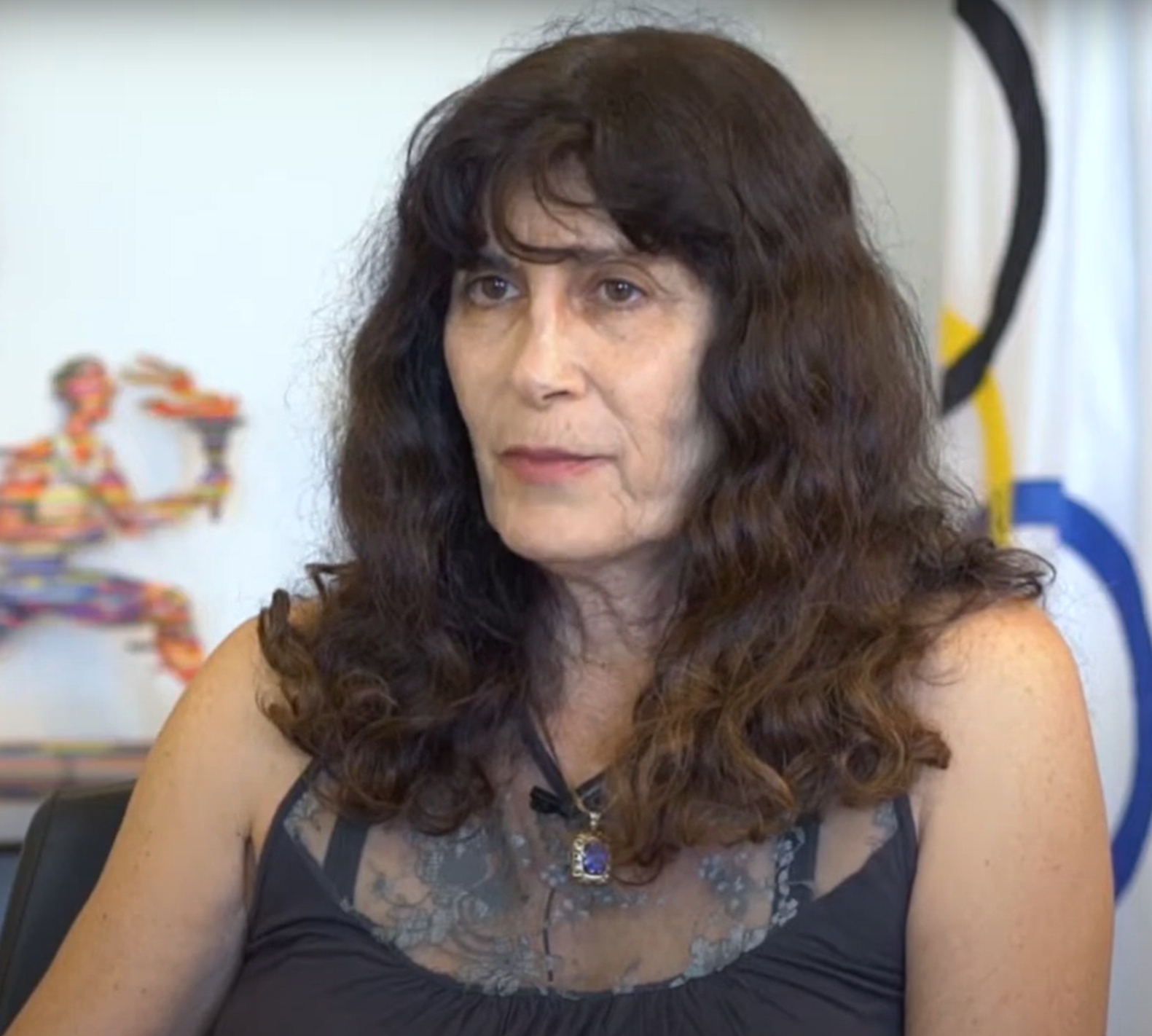
- Shahamorov in 2018

Medal record

Women's athletics

Representing Israel

Asian Games
| Gold medal – first place | Bangkok 1970 | 100 m hurdles |
| Gold medal – first place | Bangkok 1970 | Pentathlon |
| Gold medal – first place | Tehran 1974 | 100 m |
| Gold medal – first place | Tehran 1974 | 200 m |
| Gold medal – first place | Tehran 1974 | 100 m hurdles |
| Silver medal – second place | Bangkok 1970 | Long jump |

Asian Championships
| Gold medal – first place | 1975 Seoul | 100 m |
| Gold medal – first place | 1975 Seoul | 200 m |

Esther Roth-Shahamorov (Hebrew: אסתר רוט-שחמורוב; born April 16, 1952) is a former Israeli track and field athlete. She specialized in the 100-meter hurdles and the 100-meter sprint.

== Early and personal life ==
Esther Shahamorov was born in Tel Aviv, Israel, to Bukharian Jewish parents. In 1973, she married Peter Roth, a gymnast, who became her coach. She has a son, Yaron (born 1974), who was a national champion in fencing, and a daughter, Einat. After she retired from competitive sport she became a sports schoolteacher. In 2023 it was found out she was waiting for a kidney transplant, due to genetic disease. In February 2024 she had a successful transplant.

== Track career ==
=== Records ===
She once held simultaneously five Israeli national records. One of them is still a record and two others held for over 20 years.

- Her time of 11.45s in the 100m, set at the 1972 Summer Olympics in Munich, was broken on Sat Apr 19, 2014, by Olga Lenskiy. Lenskiy's result though was vacated later the same year due to skipping mandatory drug test after the competition.
- Her time of 12.93s in the 100m hurdles, set in Berlin shortly after the 1976 Summer Olympics, stood as a national record for 26 years, until it was broken by Irina Lenskiy in 2002.
- Her time of 23.57s in the 200m, set in Stuttgart in 1975, held as a record for 29 years, until it was broken, also by Irina Lenskiy, in 2002.
- Her mark of 6.14m in the long jump was a national record from 1971 to 1984.
- Her record of 4837 points in the Women's pentathlon was a national record from 1971 until the format was changed in 1977.

=== Asian Games ===
Roth won five gold medals and one silver medal in two Asian Games. She won golds in 100m hurdles and pentathlon and a silver in long jump in 1970, and three golds, in 100 m, 200 m, and 100 m hurdles, in 1974.

=== Olympics ===
At the 1972 Summer Olympics in Munich, Roth just barely missed qualifying for the final in the 100-meter sprint. She qualified for the 100-meter hurdles semifinal, but withdrew from the Games, together with the remaining members of the Israel Olympic team, after the murder of her longtime coach, Amitzur Shapira, and ten other members of the Israeli team, by Palestinian terrorists.

In 1976 Summer Olympics in Montreal where she was the Israeli flag-bearer, Roth became the first ever Israeli athlete to reach the finals in any Olympic event, and she is still the only Israeli Olympic finalist in track events, when she finished 6th in the 100-meter hurdles with a time of 13.04 seconds.

=== Maccabiah Games ===
Roth won the long jump in the 1969 Maccabiah Games with a 19-foot-3/4-inch (5.810-meter) jump.

She won the 100-meter race in the 1973 Maccabiah Games in 11.75, and the 100 m hurdles in 13.5 seconds. She won the 200-meter race in the 1977 Maccabiah Games in 24.03; and the 100-meter hurdles in the same games in 13.50.

== Awards and recognition ==
In 1999, Roth was awarded the Israel Prize for sports.

She appears in the 1999 Oscar-winning documentary One Day in September in which she gave her impressions and feelings during the 1972 Munich Athletes hostages crisis.

== See also ==
- List of Israel Prize recipients
- Sports in Israel
- List of Israeli records in athletics
