= Ramaswamy Gnanasekaran =

Indian sprinter (born 1954)

Personal information
- Nationality: Indian
- Born: 5 January 1954 (age 72) Palaiyur, Sivaganga, Tamil Nadu, India

Sport
- Country: India
- Sport: Athletics
Medal record
Men's athletics
Representing India
Asian Games
Gold medal – first place	1978 Bangkok	200 metres
Silver medal – second place	1978 Bangkok	100 metres
Asian Championships
Bronze medal – third place	1975 Seoul	100 metres
Bronze medal – third place	1975 Seoul	4×100 m
Bronze medal – third place	1979 Tokyo	4×100 m

Ramaswamy Gnanasekaran (born 5 January 1954) is an Indian sprinter. He was the gold medalist in the 200 metres in the 1978 Asian Games. He later became a coach. He was given the Arjuna Award for athletics in 1978-79.
