= Carolina Rieuwpassa =

Indonesian sprinter (1949–2023)

Personal information
- Nationality: Indonesian
- Born: 7 February 1949 Makassar, South Sulawesi, Indonesia
- Died: 16 March 2023 (aged 74) Makassar, South Sulawesi, Indonesia

Sport
- Sport: Athletics
Medal record
Women's athletics
Representing Indonesia
Asian Games
Bronze medal – third place	1970 Bangkok	100 m
Bronze medal – third place	1970 Bangkok	200 m
Asian Championships
Silver medal – second place	1975 Seoul	100 m
Bronze medal – third place	1975 Seoul	200 m
SEA Games
Gold medal – first place	1977 Kuala Lumpur	100 m
Silver medal – second place	1977 Kuala Lumpur	200 m

Carolina Rieuwpassa (7 February 1949 – 16 March 2023) was an Indonesian sprinter. She competed in the 100 metres at the 1972 Summer Olympics and the 1976 Summer Olympics.

Rieuwpassa represented Indonesia at the 1972 Summer Olympics, where she advanced to the quarterfinals in the 200 metres, and at the 1976 Summer Olympics, competing in both sprints but not progressing beyond the heats. Her career highlights included bronze medals in the 100 metres (12.4 seconds) and 200 metres (25.4 seconds) at the 1970 Asian Games in Bangkok, as well as a gold medal in the 100 metres (12.22 seconds) and silver in the 200 metres (25.41 seconds) at the 1977 SEA Games in Kuala Lumpur.

Rieuwpassa began her athletic journey representing South Sulawesi in national championships before joining Indonesia's national training center in the early 1970s. She trained in Germany, where she absorbed modern techniques such as block starts for short sprints, which she later introduced to Indonesian athletics and which remain in use today. Known for her discipline, humility, and high motivation qualities honed through rigorous training, she shared rooms with fellow athletes like Emma Tahapari during her peak years and worked for a company owned by sports patron Bob Hasan while based in Jakarta.

After retiring from competition in the 1980s, she transitioned into coaching at the national level, mentoring sprinters such as Mardi Lestari, who reached the semifinals at the 1988 Seoul Olympics, and contributing to the development of the Menteng Raya 72 athletic school, which produced numerous national and international talents.

Rieuwpassa died at Stella Maris Hospital in Makassar on 16 March 2023, at the age of 74.
