= V. Anusuya Bai =

Indian track and field athlete (b. 1953)

- Born: 23 August 1953 (age 73); Chennai, India
- Occupation: Athlete
- Known for: Arjuna Award

V. Anusuya Bai (born 23 August 1953) is an Indian former track and field athlete. She won the Arjuna Award in 1975 and four gold medals at International Athletics Meet in Pakistan in 1976. She was born in Chennai, India. She represented India at the 1973 Summer Universiade Moscow, competing in sprinting events and the discus throw. She retired as a Deputy Chief Personnel Officer (Welfare), Southern Railway of Chennai, in August, 2013.

The Hindu erroneously reported that she represented Asia at the World Athletics Championships in Düsseldorf, West Germany in 1977. The World Athletics Championships were not inaugurated until 1983; the event Bai had competed at was the 1977 IAAF World Cup, she did not feature in the results.

She was the first woman from Tamil Nadu to receive the Arjuna Award – India's top national honour for sport.
