= T. C. Yohannan =

Indian long jumper

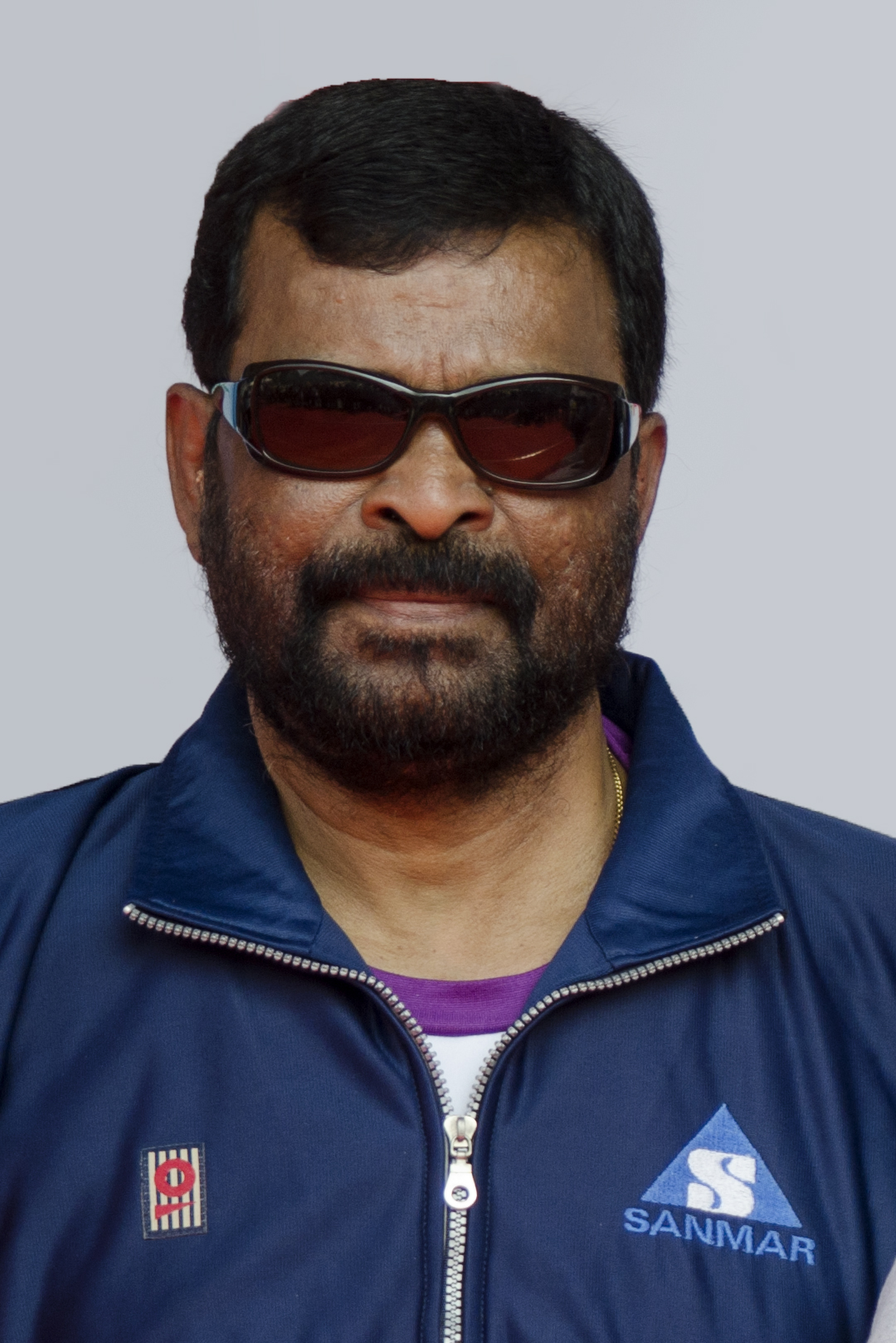

Personal information
- Full name: Thadathuvila Chandapillai Yohannan
- Nationality: Indian
- Born: 19 May 1947 (age 79) Maranadu, Kingdom of Travancore, British India (present day Kollam, Kerala, India)
- Children: Tinu Yohannan (son)

Sport
- Country: India
- Sport: Athletics
- Event: Long jump

Achievements and titles
- Personal best: 8.07 (Tehran 1974)
Medal record
Men's athletics
Representing India
Asian Games
Gold medal – first place	1974 Tehran	Long jump
Asian Championships
Gold medal – first place	1975 Seoul	Long jump
Bronze medal – third place	1973 Marikina	Triple jump

Thadathuvila Chandapillai Yohannan (born 19 May 1947), is a former Indian long jumper who held the national record in long jump for nearly 3 decades and represented India in the 1976 Summer Olympics in Montreal, Quebec, Canada. He hails from the state of Kerala. Yohannan will be known for the new dimension he gave to long jump in India in 1974, the occasion was the Tehran Asian Games of 1974. Yohannan cleared a distance of 8.07 metres at the Tehran Asian Games for a new Asian record.

== Early life ==
Yohannan was born as the youngest of six children of Chandapillai and Saramma, at Maranadu village in present-day Kollam district of Kerala on 19 May 1947, Yohannan had his early feel of athletics in the Inter-School Meets for Ezhukone Panchayat in 1964. He joined the public sector Bhilai Steel Plant, wherein he represented his Plant in the Steel Plants Sports Meet in 1969 and in the same year, had his first experience of athletics at the national level. He finished fourth in the long Jump and fifth in the triple jump. He progressed to the second spot in the long jump event of the Nationals in 1970 and then matured to set a national mark of 7.60 metres in Patiala in 1971.

=== Personal life ===
Yohannan now resides in Kochi. Former Indian cricketer Tinu Yohannan is his son.

== Career ==
As an athlete Yohannan first won the long jump and triple jump golds at the Prasanna Kumar All-India Meet in Bangalore. Selected to represent India in an international in Singapore, he won gold medals in both the long and triple jump. In 1972 he added the national triple jump title to his bag. His 7.78 metre jump created a new national record in 1973. He won the gold in Tehran Asian Games with an Asian record of 8.07 m, and became the first Asian to jump over 8 metres in the continental event. This was also an Indian national record, which remained unchallenged for 30 years. He was invited to Japan the next year and won gold medals in competition's at Tokyo, Hiroshima, Kobe and then repeated his success in championships in the Philippines and Sibu City. His last fling at international competition was at the Montreal Olympics in 1976. He hung up his shoes after that.

A diploma holder in Mechanical Engineering, Yohannan presently works as Assistant Public Relations Officer with the automobile giant TELCO.

== Awards and honours ==
Besides the national honour conferred on him in the form of Arjuna Award in 1974, he has received numerous other awards which include a merit award from the Government of Kerala and the TelcoVeer award by his employers. Yohannan is the second Malayali to win the Arjuna Award. He has also been honoured by the Bombay and Chennai Sports Journalists Association, Lions Club, Sportsweek and the Tata Sports Club of Bombay.

He is the father of former Indian cricketer Tinu Yohannan and son Tisvy Yohannan.

== See also ==
- List of Kerala Olympians
