= Sriram Singh =

Indian middle-distance runner

Honorary Captain Sriram Singh Padma Shri
Personal information
- Full name: Sriram Singh Shekhawat
- Nationality: Indian
- Born: 14 November 1948 (age 78) Badnagar, Jaipur, Rajasthan, India
- Military career
- Allegiance: India
- Branch: Indian Army
- Rank: Honorary Captain
- Unit: Rajputana Rifles
- Awards: Padma Shri

Sport
- Country: India
- Sport: Track and field
- Event: 800 metres
- Club: Rajputana Rifles

Achievements and titles
- Personal bests: 1:45.77 NR (Montreal 1976)
Medal record
Men's athletics
Representing India
Asian Games
Gold medal – first place	1974 Tehran	800 m
Gold medal – first place	1978 Bangkok	800 m
Silver medal – second place	1970 Bangkok	800 m
Silver medal – second place	1978 Bangkok	4×400 m Relay
Silver medal – second place	1974 Tehran	4×400 m Relay
Asian Championships
Silver medal – second place	1973 Seol	800 m
Gold medal – first place	1975 Seol	400 m
Gold medal – first place	1975 Seol	800 m
Gold medal – first place	1975 Seol	4×400 m

Honorary Captain Sriram Singh Shekhawat (born 14 November 1948) is a former Indian middle-distance runner.

Sriram Singh joined Rajputana Rifles in 1968 where he came under the influence of the coach Ilyas Babar. Babar persuaded him to shift his focus from 400 metres to 800 metres.

In the 1970 Asian Games in Bangkok, he was beaten to the second place in the 800 meters by Jimmy Crampton of Burma. Singh was eliminated in the heats of the Munich Olympics in 1972 but his time of 1:47.7 bettered Crampton's Asian record. Prior to the competition he had never run on synthetic tracks. He improved his time to 1:47.6 to win the gold in the 1974 Asian Games.

The high point of Sriram Singh's career was the 800m race in 1976 Montreal Olympics. The qualifying round, the semifinal and the final were run on successive days. In the first race, he broke his own Asian record with a time of 1:45.86. In the semifinal, he came fourth in a time of 1:46.42.

In the final, Singh made a huge rush from the break at 300 meters to take lead at the bell with a time of 50.85 ahead of Cuban Alberto Juantorena's 50.90. Juantorena caught up with him around the 550m mark and won in a world record time of 1:43.50. Singh faded away in the home straight to finish seventh with a time of 1:45.77. Juantorena later attributed his world record to Sriram's front running.

Sriram Singh's time stood as the Asian record until it was broken by Lee Jin-il in 1994 and as a national record for 42 years until it was broken by Jinson Johnson in June 2018.

In 1973, he was awarded the prestigious Arjuna Award, as recognition to his extraordinary achievements in athletics, and the following year was awarded the prestigious civil award of Padma Shri as recognition to his contribution to the field of sport.

He retained his 800m gold medal in the 1978 Asian Games (1:48.80), but was eliminated in the semifinal of the same event in the Moscow Olympics. He also won 800m silver medal in 1973 Asian Athletics Championships and three gold medals for 400m, 800m and, 4×400m relay in 1975 Asian Athletics Championships.

Post retirement he has mentored mostly young people in the sport.

== International competitions ==
Year	Competition	Venue	Position	Notes
1970	Asian Games	Bangkok, Thailand	2nd	800 m
1974	Asian Games	Tehran, Iran	1st	800 m
1978	Asian Games	Bangkok, Thailand	1st	800 m
