= Shivnath Singh =

Indian long-distance runner

Personal information
- Born: July 11, 1946 Majharia, Buxar, India
- Died: June 6, 2003 (aged 56) Jamshedpur, India

Sport
- Country: India
- Sport: Athletics
- Events: 5000 metres, 10000 metres, Marathon

Achievements and titles
- Personal bests: 10000 m: 28:58.1 (1978) marathon: 2:12:00 (1978) NR
Medal record
Men's athletics
Representing India
Asian Championships
Silver medal – second place	1973 Marikina	5000 m
Silver medal – second place	1973 Marikina	10,000 m
Silver medal – second place	1975 Seoul	5000 m
Silver medal – second place	1975 Seoul	10,000 m

Shivnath Singh (July 11, 1946 – June 6, 2003) was one of the greatest long-distance runners that India has produced. Singh represented India twice in the Asian games and twice at the Summer Olympics (1976 and 1980). He was born in Majharia, Buxar, Bihar in India. He joined the Indian Army in the Bihar Regiment and rose to the rank of Naib Subedar. He died on 6 June 2003 at Jamshedpur, India after a prolonged illness. He still holds India's national record for the marathon which he set in 1978. It is the longest standing Indian athletics record.

== Career ==
He represented India at the 1976 Summer Olympics and placed 11th in the 1976 Olympic Men's Marathon. He dropped out of the 1980 Olympic Men's Marathon in Moscow.

Shivnath Singh competed barefoot throughout his running career. He holds the Indian national marathon record with a best time (2:12:00), a feat that he achieved in Jalandhar in 1978.

== Achievements ==
Year	Competition	Venue	Position	Event	Notes
Representing India
1973	Asian Championship	Marikina, Philippines	2nd place, silver medalist(s)	5000 m	14:17.0
1973	Asian Championship	Marikina, Philippines	2nd place, silver medalist(s)	10000 m	29:54.8
1975	Asian Championship	Seoul, South Korea	2nd place, silver medalist(s)	5000 m	14:01.2
1975	Asian Championship	Seoul, South Korea	2nd place, silver medalist(s)	10000 m	29:14.6
1976	Olympic Games	Montréal, Canada	11th	Marathon	2:16:22
1978	Jalandhar Marathon	Jalandhar, India	(gold) NR	Marathon	2:12:00
1980	Olympic Games	Moscow, Soviet Union	—	Marathon	DNF
