= Bahadur Singh Chauhan =

Indian shot putter

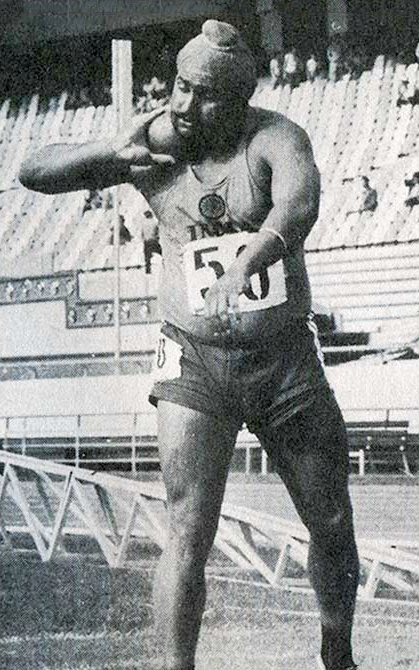
- Singh at the 1974 Asian Games

Personal information
- Born: 8 February 1946 (age 80)
- Height: 179 cm (5 ft 10 in)
- Weight: 105 kg (231 lb)

Sport
- Sport: Athletics
- Event: Shot put

Achievements and titles
- Personal best: 18.66 (1976)
Medal record
Men's athletics
Representing India
Asian Games
Gold medal – first place	1978 Bangkok	Shot put
Gold medal – first place	1982 New Delhi	Shot put
Silver medal – second place	1974 Tehran	Shot put
Asian Championships
Gold medal – first place	1975 Seoul	Shot put
Silver medal – second place	1981 Tokya	Shot put
Bronze medal – third place	1973 Manila	Shot put
Bronze medal – third place	1979 Tokyo	Shot put
Bronze medal – third place	1985 Jakarta	Shot put

Bahadur Singh Chauhan, born on 8 February 1946 in a Sikh Rajput family is a former Indian shot putter. Between 1973 and 1985 he won three gold, two silver and three bronze medals at the Asian Games and Championships. He placed 15th at the 1980 Summer Olympics, and was honoured with Arjuna award and Padma Shri. He is a recipient of Dronacharya Award, by the government of India. He worked as the head coach of India's athletics team before retiring in 2020
