= Edward Sequeira =

Edward Sequeira (born 6 February 1942), popularly known as Eddie, is a retired rhythmic middle distance runner from India. Essentially a half miler doing the metric mile for stamina, Sequeira also excelled in the 5,000 metres. Born on 6 February 1940 in Bombay, Eddie studied at: St. Paul's High School from where he joined the Central Railway as mechanical apprentice. Sports were compulsory for the Railway employees and Sequeira proved a natural athlete. He took up athletics seriously in 1959 and by 1963 had created new marks for the 800 and 1,500 at the Central Railway meet and then went on to repeat the performances at the Inter-Railway Meet in Delhi, He clocked 1:52.6 for the half mile and 3:49.4 for the 1,500 metres. His next step was the National titles and he duly won both the events in the National Games, retaining his hold on the events from 1963 to 1973. He set a new record in the 1500 metres in 1966, his time of 3.43.7 being even faster than the existing Asian mark. This record remained in the books for well over 35 years before Bahadur Prasad updated it during the Permit Meet in Delhi.

Eddie Sequeira began his long association with Tata Steel in 1964, an association which proved very fruitful to him. His athletics career took an upswing and he became a permanent member of the Indian team. He represented the country against Russia in 1965 and then went to the Commonwealth Games in Kingston in 1966, the year in which he created the national mark in the 1,500 metres.

The 1966 Asian Games in Bangkok proved to be a disaster for Sequeira who was forced to retire when in full flight in the final and had to settle for the award of" the Unlucky Athlete of the Games". The Indian star had obviously been pushed and the organizers perhaps thought fit to compensate him with the most unlikely labelled award.

Sequeira then went to Ceylon for a dual meet and won the 1,500 metres and the next year, created national mark or 14:38 in the 5000 metres in another such competition on the Ceylon tracks. He was captain of the Indian team to Malaysia and Singapore and also a member of the Asian team to West Germany he went back to Bangkok for Games and wiped out bitter memories of the previous edition of the Games with a Silver Medal In the 5000 meters. Coached by the German coach Otto Peitzer, himself a world record holder, Sequeira went to Munich Olympics in 1972 where he finished 11th in the 3rd heat of 5,000 meters clocking 14:01.4s. Munich however left other memories for Sequeira, of the killings of Israeli athletes by Palestinian terrorists.

An outstanding sportsman, Edward Sequeira contributed much to Indian athletics as a coach also, He attended a coaching conference in Tokyo in 1979. He was also on the Committee of the Amateur Federation of India, An officer with Tata Iron and Steel Co Mumbai, Sequeira was honoured the Maharashtra Government Shiv Chhatrapati Award and coveted Arjuna Award came in 1971.
