= 1982 European Athletics Championships – Men's 110 metres hurdles =

Men's 110 metres hurdles at the European Athletics Championships

These are the official results of the Men's 110 metres hurdles event at the 1982 European Championships in Athens, Greece, held at Olympic Stadium "Spiros Louis" on 9, 10, and 11 September 1982.

== Medalists ==
Gold	Thomas Munkelt; East Germany
Silver	Andrey Prokofyev; Soviet Union
Bronze	Arto Bryggare; Finland

== Final ==
11 September Wind: -0.9 m/s

Rank	Final	Time
	Thomas Munkelt (GDR)	13.41
	Andrey Prokofyev (URS)	13.46
	Arto Bryggare (FIN)	13.60
4.	Wilbert Greaves (GBR)	13.67
5.	Aleksandr Puchkov (URS)	13.79
6.	Romuald Giegiel (POL)	13.82
7.	Karl-Werner Dönges (FRG)	13.83
8.	Holger Pohland (GDR)	13.89

== Semifinals ==
10 September
Wind: 0.4 m/s

Rank	Semi-final 1	Time
1.	Andrey Prokofyev (URS)	13.58
2.	Holger Pohland (GDR)	13.62
3.	Karl-Werner Dönges (FRG)	13.65
4.	Romuald Giegiel (POL)	13.77
5.	Andreas Schlißke (GDR)	13.79
6.	György Bakos (HUN)	14.06
7.	Mark Holtom (GBR)	14.14
8.	Roberto Schneider (SUI)	14.22

Wind: 1.0 m/s

Rank	Semi-final 2	Time
1.	Thomas Munkelt (GDR)	13.47
2.	Arto Bryggare (FIN)	13.59
3.	Wilbert Greaves (GBR)	13.66
4.	Aleksandr Puchkov (URS)	13.73
5.	Javier Moracho (ESP)	13.76
6.	Georgiy Shabanov (URS)	13.79
7.	Jacek Rutkowski (POL)	13.83
8.	Ion Oltean (ROU)	13.95

== Qualifying heats ==
9 September
Wind: 0.6 m/s

Rank	Heat 1	Time
1.	Thomas Munkelt (GDR)	13.52
2.	Andrey Prokofyev (URS)	13.71
3.	Mark Holtom (GBR)	13.72
4.	Arto Bryggare (FIN)	13.72
5.	Ion Oltean (ROU)	13.82
6.	Roberto Schneider (SUI)	13.92
7.	Herbert Kreiner (AUT)	14.50

Wind: -1.7 m/s

Rank	Heat 2	Time
1.	Jacek Rutkowski (POL)	13.87
2.	Andreas Schlißke (GDR)	13.90
3.	Georgiy Shabanov (URS)	13.91
4.	György Bakos (HUN)	13.98
5.	Karl-Werner Dönges (FRG)	14.01
6.	Urs Rohner (SUI)	14.20
7.	Reijo Byman (FIN)	14.36
8.	Petros Evripidou (CYP)^{†}	14.69

^{†}: Petros Evripidou was initially assigned to compete for Greece, but there is only evidence that he competed for Cyprus.
Wind: -1.6 m/s

Rank	Heat 3	Time
1.	Romuald Giegiel (POL)	13.85
2.	Holger Pohland (GDR)	13.85
3.	Wilbert Greaves (GBR)	13.86
4.	Aleksandr Puchkov (URS)	13.95
5.	Javier Moracho (ESP)	14.01
6.	Daniele Fontecchio (ITA)	14.01
7.	Július Ivan (TCH)	14.05

== Participation ==
According to an unofficial count, 22 athletes from 14 countries participated in the event.

- Austria (1)
- Cyprus (1)
- Czechoslovakia (1)
- East Germany (3)
- Finland (2)
- Hungary (1)
- Italy (1)
- Poland (2)
- Romania (1)
- Soviet Union (3)
- Spain (1)
- Switzerland (2)
- United Kingdom (2)
- West Germany (1)

== See also ==
- 1978 Men's European Championships 110m Hurdles (Prague)
- 1980 Men's Olympic 110m Hurdles (Moscow)
- 1983 Men's World Championships 110m Hurdles (Helsinki)
- 1984 Men's Olympic 110m Hurdles (Moscow)
- 1986 Men's European Championships 110m Hurdles (Stuttgart)
- 1987 Men's World Championships 110m Hurdles (Rome)
- 1988 Men's Olympic 110m Hurdles (Seoul)
