= Athletics at the 1980 Summer Olympics – Men's 110 metres hurdles =

Men's 110 metres hurdles at the Games of the XXII Olympiad
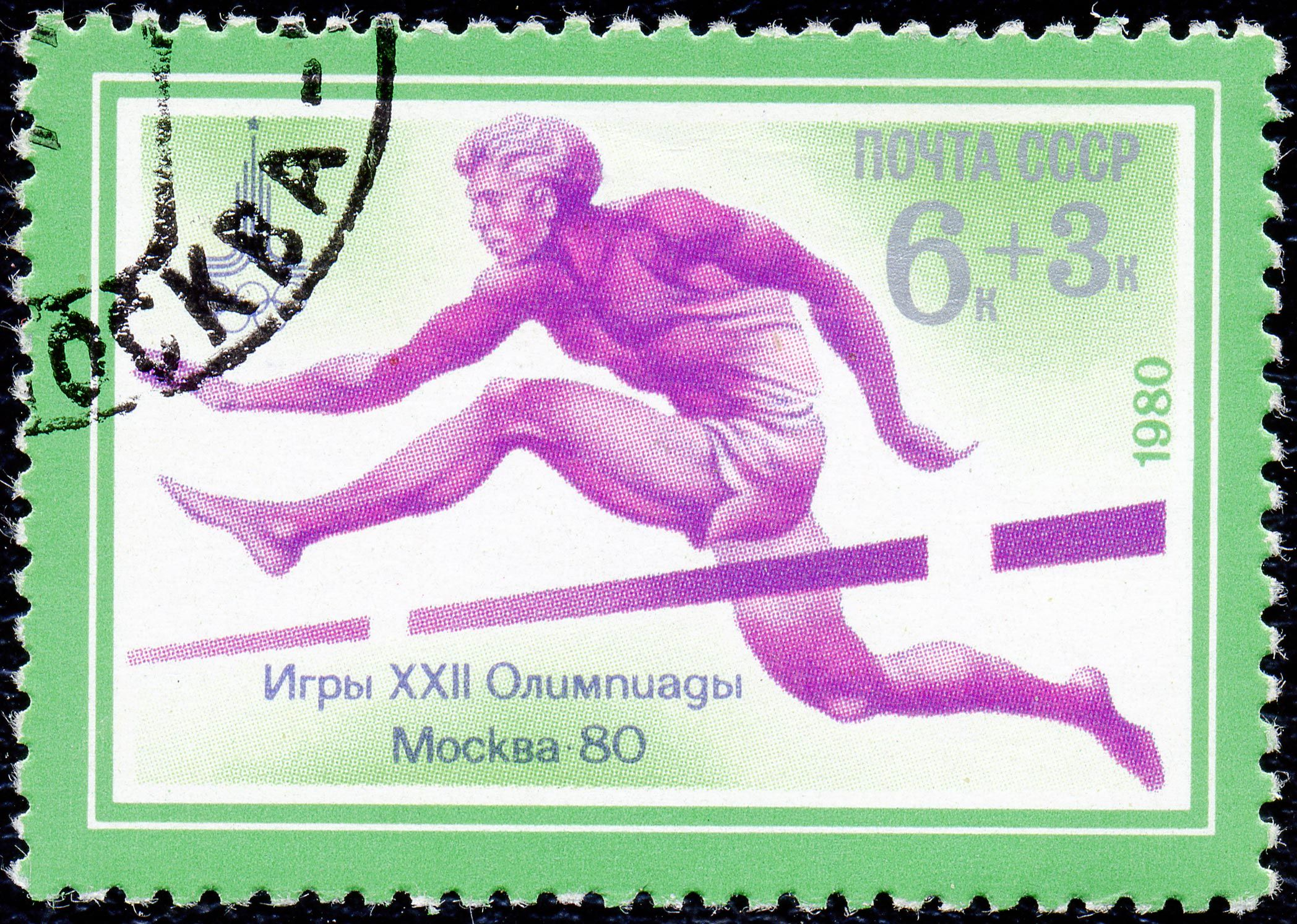
- Soviet stamp depicting hurdling
- Venue: Luzhniki Stadium
- Date: 25 and 27 July
- Competitors: 23 from 16 nations
- Winning time: 13.39

Medalists
1st place, gold medalist(s)		Thomas Munkelt; East Germany
2nd place, silver medalist(s)		Alejandro Casañas; Cuba
3rd place, bronze medalist(s)		Aleksandr Puchkov; Soviet Union

The men's 110 metres hurdles at the 1980 Summer Olympics in Moscow, Soviet Union had an entry list of 23 competitors from 16 nations, with three qualifying heats (23 runners) and two semifinals (16) before the final (8) took place on Sunday 27 July 1980. The maximum number of athletes per nation had been set at 3 since the 1930 Olympic Congress. The event was won by Thomas Munkelt of East Germany, the first medal by a German runner in the event. Alejandro Casañas of Cuba took silver for the second Games in a row, making him the eighth man with two medals in the event. Aleksandr Puchkov's bronze was the Soviet Union's second medal in the event and first since 1964.

== Background ==
This was the 19th appearance of the event, which is one of 12 athletics events to have been held at every Summer Olympics. Two finalists from 1976 returned: silver medalist Alejandro Casañas of Cuba and fifth-place finisher Thomas Munkelt of East Germany. While 1976 had been an off year for American hurdles, the United States had two dominant athletes in 1980: Renaldo Nehemiah and Greg Foster. The American-led boycott of the 1980 Games, however, prevented both from competing. In their absence, Casañas and Munkelt were favored.

Bulgaria, the Republic of the Congo, Mozambique, the Seychelles, and Syria each made their first appearance in the event. Great Britain made its 17th appearance (having missed 1900 and 1904), most of any nation competing in 1980 but still one behind the absent United States's 18.

== Competition format ==
The competition continued to use the three-round format used since 1908 (except 1960, which had four rounds) and eight-man semifinals and finals, as well as the "fastest loser" system, used since 1964. The first round consisted of three heats, with 7 or 8 hurdlers each. The top five hurdlers in each heat, along with the next fastest overall, advanced to the semifinals. The 16 semifinalists were divided into two semifinals of 8 hurdlers each; the top four hurdlers in each advanced to the 8-man final.

== Records ==
These were the standing world and Olympic records (in seconds) prior to the 1980 Summer Olympics.

World record	Renaldo Nehemiah (USA)	13.00	Los Angeles, United States	6 May 1979
Olympic record	Rod Milburn (USA)	13.24	Munich, East Germany	7 September 1972

No new world or Olympic records were set during the competition.

== Schedule ==
All times are Moscow Time (UTC+3)

Date	Time	Round
Friday, 25 July 1980	19:20	Round 1
Sunday, 27 July 1980	17:00; 19:00	Semifinals; Final

== Results ==
=== Round 1 ===
The first round was held on Friday 25 July 1980.

==== Heat 1 ====
Rank	Lane	Athlete	Nation	Time	Notes
1	6	Yuriy Chervanyov	Soviet Union	13.75	Q
2	1	Jan Pusty	Poland	13.84	Q
3	4	Plamen Krastev	Bulgaria	13.95	Q
4	2	Andreas Schlißke	East Germany	14.18	Q
5	5	Petar Vukičević	Yugoslavia	14.19	Q
6	8	Bernard Mabikana	Republic of the Congo	15.42	
7	7	Maher Hreitani	Syria	15.45	
—	3	Július Ivan	Czechoslovakia	DNF	
				Wind: +0.2 m/s	

==== Heat 2 ====
Rank	Lane	Athlete	Nation	Time	Notes
1	5	Thomas Munkelt	East Germany	13.55	Q
2	3	Andrey Prokofyev	Soviet Union	13.61	Q
3	4	Javier Moracho	Spain	13.72	Q
4	2	Wilbert Greaves	Great Britain	13.85	Q
5	6	Borisav Pisić	Yugoslavia	14.13	Q
6	1	Abdoulaye Sarr	Senegal	14.57	
7	7	Abdul Jabbar Rahima	Iraq	14.89	
				Wind: +0.5 m/s	

==== Heat 3 ====
Rank	Lane	Athlete	Nation	Time	Notes
1	4	Alejandro Casañas	Cuba	13.46	Q
2	1	Arto Bryggare	Finland	13.77	Q
3	3	Mark Holtom	Great Britain	13.83	Q
4	6	Aleksandr Puchkov	Soviet Union	13.84	Q
5	5	Thomas Dittrich	East Germany	13.93	Q
6	2	Carlos Sala	Spain	14.28	q
7	8	Abdul Ismail	Mozambique	15.18	
8	7	Antonio Gopal	Seychelles	16.36	
				Wind: +1.0 m/s	

=== Semifinals ===
The semifinals were held on Sunday 27 July 1980.

==== Semifinal 1 ====
Rank	Lane	Athlete	Nation	Time	Notes
1	8	Alejandro Casañas	Cuba	13.44	Q
2	3	Aleksandr Puchkov	Soviet Union	13.50	Q
3	2	Yuriy Chervanyov	Soviet Union	13.78	Q
4	7	Javier Moracho	Spain	13.80	Q
5	4	Thomas Dittrich	East Germany	13.90	
6	1	Wilbert Greaves	Great Britain	13.98	
7	6	Borisav Pisić	Yugoslavia	14.16	
8	5	Andreas Schlißke	East Germany	14.60	
				Wind: +0.7 m/s	

==== Semifinal 2 ====
Rank	Lane	Athlete	Nation	Time	Notes
1	7	Thomas Munkelt	East Germany	13.49	Q
2	8	Andrey Prokofyev	Soviet Union	13.59	Q
3	2	Arto Bryggare	Finland	13.78	Q
4	4	Jan Pusty	Poland	13.81	Q
5	1	Mark Holtom	Great Britain	13.94	
6	6	Plamen Krastev	Bulgaria	13.99	
7	5	Carlos Sala	Spain	14.00	
8	3	Petar Vukičević	Yugoslavia	14.12	
				Wind: +0.9 m/s	

=== Final ===
Casañas hit the first two hurdles, allowing Munkelt to build a lead; Casañas nearly caught him, but "lost out to Munkelt in a lean at the tape."

Rank	Lane	Athlete	Nation	Reaction	Time
1st place, gold medalist(s)	3	Thomas Munkelt	East Germany	0.129	13.39
2nd place, silver medalist(s)	6	Alejandro Casañas	Cuba	0.144	13.40
3rd place, bronze medalist(s)	4	Aleksandr Puchkov	Soviet Union	0.145	13.44
4	5	Andrey Prokofyev	Soviet Union	0.145	13.49
5	1	Jan Pusty	Poland	0.149	13.68
6	2	Arto Bryggare	Finland	0.175	13.76
7	8	Javier Moracho	Spain	0.151	13.78
8	7	Yuriy Chervanyov	Soviet Union	0.166	15.80
				Wind: +0.9 m/s	

== See also ==
- 1976 Men's Olympic 110m Hurdles (Montreal)
- 1978 Men's European Championships 110m Hurdles (Prague)
- 1982 Men's European Championships 110m Hurdles (Athens)
- 1983 Men's World Championships 110m Hurdles (Helsinki)
- 1984 Men's Olympic 110m Hurdles (Los Angeles)
- 1984 Men's Friendship Games 110m Hurdles (Moscow)
