= 1980 European Athletics Indoor Championships – Men's 60 metres hurdles =

The men's 60 metres hurdles event at the 1980 European Athletics Indoor Championships was held on 2 March in Sindelfingen.

== Medalists ==
Gold	Silver	Bronze
Yuriy Chervanyov; Soviet Union	Romuald Giegiel; Poland	Javier Moracho; Spain

== Results ==
=== Heats ===
First 3 from each heat (Q) and the next 3 fastest (q) qualified for the semifinals.

Rank	Heat	Name	Nationality	Time	Notes
1	2	Aleksandr Puchkov	Soviet Union	7.67	Q
2	3	Yuriy Chervanyov	Soviet Union	7.69	Q
3	2	Javier Moracho	Spain	7.73	Q
4	2	Romuald Giegiel	Poland	7.76	Q
5	1	Andrey Prokofyev	Soviet Union	7.79	Q
6	3	Plamen Krastev	Bulgaria	7.81	Q
7	2	Roberto Schneider	Switzerland	7.82	q
8	1	Jan Pusty	Poland	7.83	Q
9	2	Vasko Nedyalkov	Bulgaria	7.88	q
9	3	Giuseppe Buttari	Italy	7.88	Q
11	3	Krystian Torka	Poland	7.90	q
12	3	Hans-Gerd Klein	West Germany	7.93	
13	2	György Bakos	Hungary	7.95	
14	1	Karl-Werner Dönges	West Germany	7.99	Q
15	3	Július Ivan	Czechoslovakia	8.02	
16	1	Herbert Kreiner	Austria	8.12	
17	1	Christer Gullstrand	Sweden	8.17	

=== Semifinals ===
First 3 from each semifinal qualified directly (Q) for the final.

Rank	Heat	Name	Nationality	Time	Notes
1	2	Yuriy Chervanyov	Soviet Union	7.63	Q
2	1	Andrey Prokofyev	Soviet Union	7.67	Q
3	2	Javier Moracho	Spain	7.72	Q
4	1	Jan Pusty	Poland	7.75	Q
5	1	Romuald Giegiel	Poland	7.78	Q
6	1	Vasko Nedyalkov	Bulgaria	7.79	
6	2	Plamen Krastev	Bulgaria	7.79	Q
8	2	Roberto Schneider	Switzerland	7.81	
9	1	Karl-Werner Dönges	West Germany	7.97	
9	2	Giuseppe Buttari	Italy	7.97	
11	2	Krystian Torka	Poland	8.02	
	1	Aleksandr Puchkov	Soviet Union	DNF	

=== Final ===
Rank	Name	Nationality	Time	Notes
1st place, gold medalist(s)	Yuriy Chervanyov	Soviet Union	7.54	WR
2nd place, silver medalist(s)	Romuald Giegiel	Poland	7.73	
3rd place, bronze medalist(s)	Javier Moracho	Spain	7.75	
4	Plamen Krastev	Bulgaria	7.79	
5	Andrey Prokofyev	Soviet Union	7.84	
6	Jan Pusty	Poland	7.87	
