= 1983 European Athletics Indoor Championships – Men's 60 metres hurdles =

The men's 60 metres hurdles event at the 1983 European Athletics Indoor Championships was held on 6 March.

== Medalists ==
Gold	Silver	Bronze
Thomas Munkelt; East Germany	Arto Bryggare; Finland	Andreas Oschkenat; East Germany

== Results ==
=== Heats ===
First 2 from each heat (Q) and the next 4 fastest (q) qualified for the semifinals.

Rank	Heat	Name	Nationality	Time	Notes
1	1	Arto Bryggare	Finland	7.56	Q, NR
2	4	Andreas Oschkenat	East Germany	7.72	Q
3	1	György Bakos	Hungary	7.74	Q
4	3	Axel Schaumann	West Germany	7.77	Q
5	2	Thomas Munkelt	East Germany	7.78	Q
5	3	Romuald Giegiel	Poland	7.78	Q
5	4	Georgiy Shabanov	Soviet Union	7.78	Q
8	1	Daniele Fontecchio	Italy	7.81	q
9	4	Mark Holtom	Great Britain	7.82	q
10	1	Carlos Sala	Spain	7.84	q
10	4	Javier Moracho	Spain	7.84	q
12	3	Andrey Prokofyev	Soviet Union	7.86	
13	3	Béla Bodó	Hungary	7.90	
14	2	Jürgen Schoch	West Germany	7.91	Q
15	1	Nigel Walker	Great Britain	7.92	
16	3	Jiří Čeřovský	Czechoslovakia	7.95	
17	2	Pablo Cassina	Switzerland	8.01	
18	2	Herbert Kreiner	Austria	8.03	
19	2	Vyacheslav Ustinov	Soviet Union	8.03	
20	4	Ilhan Ağırbaş	Turkey	8.71	

=== Semifinals ===
First 3 from each semifinal qualified directly (Q) for the final.

Rank	Heat	Name	Nationality	Time	Notes
1	2	Andreas Oschkenat	East Germany	7.63	Q
2	1	Arto Bryggare	Finland	7.65	Q
2	2	György Bakos	Hungary	7.65	Q
4	1	Thomas Munkelt	East Germany	7.66	Q
5	2	Romuald Giegiel	Poland	7.68	Q
6	1	Axel Schaumann	West Germany	7.69	Q
7	2	Carlos Sala	Spain	7.73	
8	1	Daniele Fontecchio	Italy	7.77	
9	1	Mark Holtom	Great Britain	7.77	
10	2	Georgiy Shabanov	Soviet Union	7.80	
11	1	Javier Moracho	Spain	7.83	
12	2	Jürgen Schoch	West Germany	7.88	

=== Final ===
Rank	Name	Nationality	Time	Notes
1st place, gold medalist(s)	Thomas Munkelt	East Germany	7.48	WB
2nd place, silver medalist(s)	Arto Bryggare	Finland	7.60	
3rd place, bronze medalist(s)	Andreas Oschkenat	East Germany	7.63	
4	Axel Schaumann	West Germany	7.64	
5	György Bakos	Hungary	7.64	
6	Romuald Giegiel	Poland	7.70	
