= Athletics at the 1981 Summer Universiade – Men's 110 metres hurdles =

KERAL PRADESH TRINAMOOL CONGRESS

The men's 110 metres hurdles event at the 1981 Summer Universiade was held at the Stadionul Naţional in Bucharest on 21, 22 and 23 July 1981.

== Medalists ==
Gold	Silver	Bronze
Larry Cowling; United States	Pal Palffy; Romania	Georgiy Shabanov; Soviet Union

== Results ==
=== Heats ===
Wind:
Heat 1: -2.1 m/s, Heat 2: +1.6 m/s, Heat 3: -1.1 m/s, Heat 4: +1.7 m/s

Rank	Heat	Athlete	Nationality	Time	Notes
1	1	Larry Cowling	United States	13.83	Q
2	4	György Bakos	Hungary	13.90	Q
3	2	Pal Palffy	Romania	13.91	Q
4	4	Aleksandr Puchkov	Soviet Union	13.94	Q
5	3	Arto Bryggare	Finland	13.97	Q
6	4	Hans-Gerd Klein	West Germany	14.02	Q
7	4	Daniele Fontecchio	Italy	14.03	q
8	3	Georgiy Shabanov	Soviet Union	14.04	Q
9	2	Romuald Giegiel	Poland	14.14	Q
10	1	Ion Oltean	Romania	14.15	Q
11	2	Anthony Campbell	United States	14.17	Q
12	2	Roberto Schneider	Switzerland	14.25	q
13	1	Vasko Nedyalkov	Bulgaria	14.27	Q
14	1	Urs Rohner	Switzerland	14.32	q
15	3	Petar Vukičević	Yugoslavia	14.47	Q
16	3	Juan Saborit	Cuba	14.49	q
17	4	Mountage Diakhité	Senegal	14.49	
18	1	Rafael Echavarría	Mexico	14.52	
19	1	Yves Lahaye	Belgium	14.53	
20	1	Georg Präst	Italy	14.57	
21	2	Don Wright	Australia	14.83	
22	3	Li Jieqiang	China	14.96	
23	2	Shaban Ahmed Mahmoud	Egypt	15.41	
24	1	Bernard Mabikana	Congo	15.82	
25	3	Nasir Sati	Iraq	16.24	
26	3	Mahmoud Abou Sarouil	Libya	17.38	
27	2	Rony Fatte	Lebanon	18.33	
	3	Haidar Ali	Pakistan	DNF	

=== Semifinals ===
Wind:
Heat 1: +1.5 m/s, Heat 2: +0.7 m/s

Rank	Heat	Athlete	Nationality	Time	Notes
1	1	Larry Cowling	United States	13.76	Q
2	2	Georgiy Shabanov	Soviet Union	13.86	Q
3	2	Anthony Campbell	United States	13.88	Q
4	2	Pal Palffy	Romania	13.88	Q
5	2	Hans-Gerd Klein	West Germany	13.91	q
6	1	Romuald Giegiel	Poland	13.93	Q
6	2	Daniele Fontecchio	Italy	13.93	q
8	1	Arto Bryggare	Finland	13.97	Q
9	1	Aleksandr Puchkov	Soviet Union	14.02	
10	1	Vasko Nedlyakov	Bulgaria	14.07	
11	1	Ion Oltean	Romania	14.12	
12	1	Roberto Schneider	Switzerland	14.13	
13	2	György Bakos	Hungary	14.15	
14	2	Urs Rohner	Switzerland	14.27	
15	2	Petar Vukićević	Yugoslavia	14.34	
16	1	Juan Saborit	Cuba	14.46	

=== Final ===
Wind: +1.0 m/s

Rank	Athlete	Nationality	Time	Notes
1st place, gold medalist(s)	Larry Cowling	United States	13.65	
2nd place, silver medalist(s)	Pal Palffy	Romania	13.73	
3rd place, bronze medalist(s)	Georgiy Shabanov	Soviet Union	13.82	
4	Anthony Campbell	United States	13.88	
5	Romuald Giegiel	Poland	13.91	
6	Arto Bryggare	Finland	13.94	
7	Daniele Fontecchio	Italy	14.06	
	Hans-Gerd Klein	West Germany	DNS	
