= 1982 European Athletics Indoor Championships – Men's 60 metres hurdles =

The men's 60 metres hurdles event at the 1982 European Athletics Indoor Championships was held on 7 March.

== Medalists ==
Gold	Silver	Bronze
Aleksandr Puchkov; Soviet Union	Plamen Krastev; Bulgaria	Karl-Werner Dönges; West Germany

== Results ==
=== Heats ===
First 3 from each heat (Q) and the next 3 fastest (q) qualified for the semifinals.

Rank	Heat	Name	Nationality	Time	Notes
1	2	Yuriy Chervanyov	Soviet Union	7.75	Q
2	2	Plamen Krastev	Bulgaria	7.75	Q
3	1	Axel Schaumann	West Germany	7.79	Q
4	2	Mark Holtom	Great Britain	7.81	Q
5	3	Aleksandr Puchkov	Soviet Union	7.83	Q
6	1	Javier Moracho	Spain	7.87	Q
7	2	Karl-Werner Dönges	West Germany	7.94	q
7	3	Arto Bryggare	Finland	7.94	Q
9	1	Roberto Schneider	Switzerland	7.97	Q
10	1	Daniele Fontecchio	Italy	7.99	q
10	2	Marco Braccini	Italy	7.99	q
12	3	György Bakos	Hungary	8.01	Q
13	3	Georg Präst	Italy	8.03	
14	3	Philippe Hatil	France	8.37	

=== Semifinals ===
First 3 from each semifinal qualified directly (Q) for the final.

Rank	Heat	Name	Nationality	Time	Notes
1	1	Plamen Krastev	Bulgaria	7.68	Q
2	2	Karl-Werner Dönges	West Germany	7.71	Q
3	2	Yuriy Chervanyov	Soviet Union	7.71	Q
4	2	Mark Holtom	Great Britain	7.72	Q
5	2	Javier Moracho	Spain	7.77	
6	1	Aleksandr Puchkov	Soviet Union	7.78	Q
7	1	Axel Schaumann	West Germany	7.87	Q
8	1	Arto Bryggare	Finland	7.89	
9	2	György Bakos	Hungary	7.94	
10	1	Roberto Schneider	Switzerland	7.97	
11	1	Marco Braccini	Italy	7.98	
12	2	Daniele Fontecchio	Italy	8.17	

=== Final ===
Rank	Name	Nationality	Time	Notes
1st place, gold medalist(s)	Aleksandr Puchkov	Soviet Union	7.73	
2nd place, silver medalist(s)	Plamen Krastev	Bulgaria	7.74	
3rd place, bronze medalist(s)	Karl-Werner Dönges	West Germany	7.80	
4	Axel Schaumann	West Germany	7.82	
5	Mark Holtom	Great Britain	7.83	
	Yuriy Chervanyov	Soviet Union	DNF	
