= 1981 European Athletics Indoor Championships – Men's 50 metres hurdles =

The men's 50 metres hurdles event at the 1981 European Athletics Indoor Championships was held on 22 February.

== Medalists ==
Gold	Silver	Bronze
Arto Bryggare; Finland	Javier Moracho; Spain	Guy Drut; France

== Results ==
=== Heats ===
First 3 from each heat (Q) and the next 3 fastest (q) qualified for the semifinals.

Rank	Heat	Name	Nationality	Time	Notes
1	3	Arto Bryggare	Finland	6.53	Q
2	2	Stepan Kuziv	Soviet Union	6.58	Q
3	3	Guy Drut	France	6.63	Q
4	2	Javier Moracho	Spain	6.64	Q
5	1	Yuriy Chervanyov	Soviet Union	6.65	Q
6	1	Plamen Krastev	Bulgaria	6.66	Q
7	2	Hans-Gerd Klein	West Germany	6.67	Q
8	2	Pablo Cassina	Switzerland	6.71	q
9	1	Dieter Gebhard	West Germany	6.72	Q
10	1	Daniele Fontecchio	Italy	6.73	q
10	3	György Bakos	Hungary	6.73	Q
12	3	Roberto Schneider	Switzerland	6.74	q
13	2	Vasko Nedyalkov	Bulgaria	6.75	
14	1	Jiří Čeřovský	Czechoslovakia	6.76	
15	1	Jean-Yves Clerc	France	6.83	
16	3	Marco Braccini	Italy	6.97	

=== Semifinals ===
First 3 from each semifinal qualified directly (Q) for the final.

Rank	Heat	Name	Nationality	Time	Notes
1	2	Arto Bryggare	Finland	6.54	Q
2	2	Javier Moracho	Spain	6.58	Q
3	1	Guy Drut	France	6.59	Q
4	1	Hans-Gerd Klein	West Germany	6.60	Q
5	2	Yuriy Chervanyov	Soviet Union	6.63	Q
6	1	Plamen Krastev	Bulgaria	6.64	Q
7	1	Stepan Kuziv	Soviet Union	6.66	
8	1	Dieter Gebhard	West Germany	6.66	
9	2	György Bakos	Hungary	6.69	
10	2	Daniele Fontecchio	Italy	6.79	
11	2	Pablo Cassina	Switzerland	6.83	
	1	Roberto Schneider	Switzerland	DNF	

=== Final ===
Rank	Name	Nationality	Time	Notes
1st place, gold medalist(s)	Arto Bryggare	Finland	6.47	CR, NR
2nd place, silver medalist(s)	Javier Moracho	Spain	6.48	
3rd place, bronze medalist(s)	Guy Drut	France	6.54	
4	Plamen Krastev	Bulgaria	6.62	NR
5	Yuriy Chervanyov	Soviet Union	6.62	
6	Hans-Gerd Klein	West Germany	6.71	
