= Athletics at the 1979 Summer Universiade – Men's 110 metres hurdles =

The men's 110 metres hurdles event at the 1979 Summer Universiade was held at the Estadio Olimpico Universitario in Mexico City on 9 and 10 September 1979.

== Medalists ==
Gold	Silver	Bronze
Andrey Prokofyev; Soviet Union	Thomas Munkelt; East Germany	Aleksandr Puchkov; Soviet Union

== Results ==
=== Heats ===
Wind:
Heat 1: 0.0 m/s, Heat 2: 0.0 m/s, Heat 3: 0.0 m/s

Rank	Heat	Athlete	Nationality	Time	Notes
1	3	Andrey Prokofyev	Soviet Union	13.54	Q
2	1	Aleksandr Puchkov	Soviet Union	13.56	Q
3	1	Thomas Munkelt	East Germany	13.64	Q
4	3	Javier Moracho	Spain	13.71	Q, NR
5	2	Giuseppe Buttari	Italy	13.73	Q
6	3	Dedy Cooper	United States	13.84	q
7	3	Rafael Echevarría	Mexico	13.95	q
8	2	Daniel Oliver	United States	13.97	Q
9	1	Roberto Schneider	Switzerland	14.09	
10	1	Dionisio Vera	Cuba	14.16	
11	2	Pat Fogarty	Canada	14.17	
12	2	Dimitrios Gargalianos	Greece	14.18	
13	2	Urs Rohner	Switzerland	14.22	
14	1	Nikos Evripidou	Greece	14.26	
15	3	Peter Mark Allen	New Zealand	14.30	
16	3	Mountaga Diakhaté	Senegal	14.50	
17	3	Karl Jørgensen	Denmark	14.72	
18	1	Rodolfo Chavira	Mexico	15.02	
19	1	Jean-Lalao Razafindranaivo	Madagascar	15.64	
20	2	Mohamed Liquat Hossain	Bangladesh	16.09	
21	1	Arturo Girón	Guatemala	16.86	

=== Final ===
Wind: +0.3 m/s

Rank	Athlete	Nationality	Time	Notes
1st place, gold medalist(s)	Andrey Prokofyev	Soviet Union	13.50	NR
2nd place, silver medalist(s)	Thomas Munkelt	East Germany	13.50	
3rd place, bronze medalist(s)	Aleksandr Puchkov	Soviet Union	13.55	
4	Javier Moracho	Spain	13.84	
5	Giuseppe Buttari	Italy	13.88	
6	Dedy Cooper	United States	13.93	
7	Rafael Echeverría	Mexico	14.16	
8	Daniel Oliver	United States	14.20	
