= 1986 European Athletics Indoor Championships – Men's 60 metres hurdles =

The men's 60 metres hurdles event at the 1986 European Athletics Indoor Championships was held on 23 February.

== Medalists ==
Gold	Silver	Bronze
Javier Moracho; Spain	Daniele Fontecchio; Italy	Holger Pohland; East Germany

== Results ==
=== Heats ===
First 2 from each heat (Q) and the next 2 fastest (q) qualified for the final.

Rank	Heat	Name	Nationality	Time	Notes
1	2	Liviu Giurgian	Romania	7.70	Q
2	2	Holger Pohland	East Germany	7.70	Q
3	1	Daniele Fontecchio	Italy	7.71	Q
4	2	Carlos Sala	Spain	7.73	q
5	1	Javier Moracho	Spain	7.74	Q
6	2	Romuald Giegiel	Poland	7.75	q
7	1	Plamen Krastev	Bulgaria	7.82	
8	1	Philippe Aubert	France	7.86	
9	1	Krzysztof Płatek	Poland	7.87	
9	2	Luigi Bertocchi	Italy	7.87	
11	2	Steve Buckeridge	Great Britain	7.89	
	1	Fausto Frigerio	Italy	DNS	

=== Final ===
Rank	Lane	Name	Nationality	Time	Notes
1st place, gold medalist(s)	6	Javier Moracho	Spain	7.67	
2nd place, silver medalist(s)	4	Daniele Fontecchio	Italy	7.70	
3rd place, bronze medalist(s)	2	Holger Pohland	East Germany	7.71	
4	3	Carlos Sala	Spain	7.74	
5	5	Liviu Giurgian	Romania	7.74	
6	1	Romuald Giegiel	Poland	7.75	
