= 1986 European Athletics Championships – Men's 110 metres hurdles =

Men's 110 metres hurdles at the European Athletics Championships

These are the official results of the Men's 110 metres hurdles event at the 1986 European Championships in Stuttgart, West Germany, held at Neckarstadion on 28, 29, and 30 August 1986.

== Medalists ==
| Gold | Stéphane Caristan; France |
| Silver | Arto Bryggare; Finland |
| Bronze | Carles Sala; Spain |

== Results ==
=== Final ===
30 August Wind: 2.0 m/s

| Rank | Name | Nationality | Time | Notes |
|---|---|---|---|---|
| 1st place, gold medalist(s) | Stéphane Caristan | France | 13.20 | CR ER |
| 2nd place, silver medalist(s) | Arto Bryggare | Finland | 13.42 | |
| 3rd place, bronze medalist(s) | Carles Sala | Spain | 13.50 | |
| 4 | Nigel Walker | United Kingdom | 13.52 | PB |
| 5 | Andreas Oschkenat | East Germany | 13.55 | |
| 6 | Jon Ridgeon | United Kingdom | 13.70 | |
| 7 | Liviu Giurgian | Romania | 13.71 | |
| 8 | György Bakos | Hungary | 13.84 | |

=== Semi-finals ===
29 August

==== Semi-final 1 ====
Wind: 0.9 m/s

| Rank | Name | Nationality | Time | Notes |
|---|---|---|---|---|
| 1 | Stéphane Caristan | France | 13.28 | CR NR Q |
| 2 | Carles Sala | Spain | 13.57 | Q |
| 3 | Liviu Giurgian | Romania | 13.61 | Q |
| 4 | Jon Ridgeon | United Kingdom | 13.66 | Q |
| 5 | Mikael Ylöstalo | Finland | 13.69 | |
| 6 | Aleksandr Markin | Soviet Union | 13.78 | |
| 7 | Roland Marloye | Belgium | 14.02 | NR |
| 8 | Gianni Tozzi | Italy | 14.16 | |

==== Semi-final 2 ====
Wind: 0.7 m/s

| Rank | Name | Nationality | Time | Notes |
|---|---|---|---|---|
| 1 | Andreas Oschkenat | East Germany | 13.52 | Q |
| 2 | Nigel Walker | United Kingdom | 13.54 | Q, PB |
| 3 | Arto Bryggare | Finland | 13.57 | Q |
| 4 | György Bakos | Hungary | 13.60 | Q |
| 5 | Igors Kazanovs | Soviet Union | 13.76 | |
| 6 | Plamen Krastev | Bulgaria | 13.81 | |
| 7 | Daniele Fontecchio | Italy | 13.89 | |
| 8 | Ulf Söderman | Sweden | 13.94 | |

=== Heats ===
28 August

==== Heat 1 ====
Wind: 0.0 m/s

| Rank | Name | Nationality | Time | Notes |
|---|---|---|---|---|
| 1 | Liviu Giurgian | Romania | 13.74 | Q |
| 2 | Nigel Walker | United Kingdom | 13.76 | Q |
| 3 | Aleksandr Markin | Soviet Union | 13.78 | Q |
| 4 | Carles Sala | Spain | 13.85 | q |
| 5 | Mikael Ylöstalo | Finland | 14.00 | q |
| 6 | Ulf Söderman | Sweden | 14.05 | q |

==== Heat 2 ====
Wind: -0.9 m/s

| Rank | Name | Nationality | Time | Notes |
|---|---|---|---|---|
| 1 | Plamen Krastev | Bulgaria | 13.81 | Q |
| 2 | Andreas Oschkenat | East Germany | 13.82 | Q |
| 3 | Gianni Tozzi | Italy | 14.01 | Q |
| 4 | Andrey Prokofyev | Soviet Union | 14.06 | |
| 5 | Robert Ekpete | Norway | 14.34 | |
| 6 | João Lima | Portugal | 14.47 | |
| | Franck Chevallier | France | DNF | |

==== Heat 3 ====
Wind: -1.0 m/s

| Rank | Name | Nationality | Time | Notes |
|---|---|---|---|---|
| 1 | Igors Kazanovs | Soviet Union | 13.89 | Q |
| 2 | György Bakos | Hungary | 13.96 | Q |
| 3 | Roland Marloye | Belgium | 14.35 | Q |
| 4 | Peter Eriksson | Sweden | 14.46 | |
| 5 | Romuald Giegiel | Poland | 14.55 | |

==== Heat 4 ====
Wind: -1.0 m/s

| Rank | Name | Nationality | Time | Notes |
|---|---|---|---|---|
| 1 | Stéphane Caristan | France | 13.46 | Q |
| 2 | Arto Bryggare | Finland | 13.58 | Q |
| 3 | Jon Ridgeon | United Kingdom | 13.87 | Q |
| 4 | Daniele Fontecchio | Italy | 14.05 | q |
| 5 | Michael Radzey | West Germany | 14.34 | |
| 6 | Serge Liègeois | Belgium | 14.34 | |
| 7 | Erik Sidenius Jensen | Denmark | 14.60 | |

== Participation ==
According to an unofficial count, 25 athletes from 17 countries participated in the event.

- Belgium (2)
- Bulgaria (1)
- Denmark (1)
- East Germany (1)
- Finland (2)
- France (2)
- Hungary (1)
- Italy (2)
- Norway (1)
- Poland (1)
- Portugal (1)
- Romania (1)
- Soviet Union (3)
- Spain (1)
- Sweden (2)
- United Kingdom (2)
- West Germany (1)
