= 1985 European Athletics Indoor Championships – Men's 60 metres hurdles =

The men's 60 metres hurdles event at the 1985 European Athletics Indoor Championships was held on 3 March.

== Medalists ==
Gold	Silver	Bronze
György Bakos; Hungary	Jiří Hudec; Czechoslovakia	Vyacheslav Ustinov; Soviet Union

== Results ==
=== Heats ===
First 2 from each heat (Q) and the next 4 fastest (q) qualified for the semifinals.

Rank	Heat	Name	Nationality	Time	Notes
1	2	György Bakos	Hungary	7.71	Q
2	4	Holger Pohland	East Germany	7.72	Q
3	2	Jon Ridgeon	Great Britain	7.75	Q
4	2	Vyacheslav Ustinov	Soviet Union	7.75	q
5	4	Daniele Fontecchio	Italy	7.76	Q
6	4	Carlos Sala	Spain	7.76	q
7	1	Jiří Hudec	Czechoslovakia	7.77	Q
8	1	Nigel Walker	Great Britain	7.78	Q
9	3	Javier Moracho	Spain	7.84	Q
10	1	Igors Kazanovs	Soviet Union	7.86	q
11	3	Romuald Giegiel	Poland	7.87	Q
12	3	Colin Jackson	Great Britain	7.88	q
13	1	Luigi Bertocchi	Italy	7.90	
13	2	Aleš Höffer	Czechoslovakia	7.90	
15	3	Béla Bodó	Hungary	7.92	
16	2	Franciszek Jóźwicki	Poland	7.95	
16	3	Gianni Tozzi	Italy	7.95	
18	4	Krzysztof Płatek	Poland	7.97	
19	1	Philippe Aubert	France	8.01	
20	3	Ulf Söderman	Sweden	8.04	
21	1	Petter Hesselberg	Norway	8.07	
22	2	João Lima	Portugal	8.08	
	4	Yorgos Tsiandas	Greece	DNS	

=== Semifinals ===
First 3 from each semifinal qualified directly (Q) for the final.

Rank	Heat	Name	Nationality	Time	Notes
1	2	Jiří Hudec	Czechoslovakia	7.64	Q
2	1	György Bakos	Hungary	7.66	Q
3	2	Jon Ridgeon	Great Britain	7.68	Q
4	1	Vyacheslav Ustinov	Soviet Union	7.70	Q
4	2	Daniele Fontecchio	Italy	7.70	Q
6	1	Nigel Walker	Great Britain	7.71	Q
7	1	Carlos Sala	Spain	7.73	
8	2	Javier Moracho	Spain	7.75	
9	2	Igors Kazanovs	Soviet Union	7.75	
10	1	Colin Jackson	Great Britain	7.85	
11	2	Holger Pohland	East Germany	7.88	
12	1	Romuald Giegiel	Poland	7.91	

=== Final ===
Rank	Lane	Name	Nationality	Time	Notes
1st place, gold medalist(s)	4	György Bakos	Hungary	7.60	NR
2nd place, silver medalist(s)	3	Jiří Hudec	Czechoslovakia	7.68	
3rd place, bronze medalist(s)	1	Vyacheslav Ustinov	Soviet Union	7.70	
4	5	Daniele Fontecchio	Italy	7.72	
5	6	Nigel Walker	Great Britain	7.72	
6	2	Jon Ridgeon	Great Britain	7.77	
