= Athletics at the 1985 Summer Universiade – Men's 110 metres hurdles =

The men's 110 metres hurdles event at the 1985 Summer Universiade was held at the Kobe Universiade Memorial Stadium in Kobe on 2 and 3 September 1985.

== Medalists ==
Gold	Silver	Bronze
Cletus Clark; United States	György Bakos; Hungary	Keith Talley; United States

== Results ==
=== Heats ===
Held on 2 September

Rank	Heat	Athlete	Nationality	Time	Notes
1	1	Cletus Clark	United States	13.70	Q
2	1	Vyacheslav Ustinov	Soviet Union	13.97	Q
3	2	Keith Talley	United States	14.06	Q
4	1	Jürgen Schoch	West Germany	14.15	Q
5	3	Carlos Sala	Spain	14.21	Q
6	1	René Djédjémel Mélédjé	Ivory Coast	14.23	q
7	2	Michael Radzey	West Germany	14.32	Q
7	4	Liviu Giurgian	Romania	14.32	Q
9	4	György Bakos	Hungary	14.33	Q
10	4	Pedro Chiamulera	Brazil	14.35	Q
11	4	Gianni Tozzi	Italy	14.42	q
12	4	Michel Brodeur	Canada	14.47	q
13	2	Masahiko Sugii	Japan	14.54	Q
14	3	Katsunori Iwasaki	Japan	14.55	Q
15	3	Serge Liègeois	Belgium	14.58	Q
16	2	Ma Weiliang	China	14.64	q
17	1	Yeung C.	Hong Kong	15.89	
18	2	J. Sitonik	Kenya	16.26	
19	3	Abdulrahman Al-Marimi	Libya	16.29	
20	1	Amhaz Abdel Fattah	Lebanon	16.48	
21	4	Mauricio Carranza	El Salvador	16.75	

=== Semifinals ===
Held on 3 September

Wind:
Heat 1: +0.9 m/s, Heat 2: +0.3 m/s

Rank	Heat	Athlete	Nationality	Time	Notes
1	1	György Bakos	Hungary	13.73	Q
2	1	Cletus Clark	United States	13.75	Q
3	1	Carlos Sala	Spain	13.76	Q
4	1	Liviu Giurgian	Romania	13.91	q
5	2	Vyacheslav Ustinov	Soviet Union	13.97	Q
6	2	Keith Talley	United States	14.00	Q
7	2	Pedro Chiamulera	Brazil	14.05	Q
8	2	Michael Radzey	West Germany	14.08	q
9	1	Michel Brodeur	Canada	14.18	
10	2	Serge Liègeois	Belgium	14.25	
11	2	René Djédjémel Mélédjé	Ivory Coast	14.27	
12	1	Jürgen Schoch	West Germany	14.28	
13	1	Masahiko Sugii	Japan	14.29	
14	2	Katsunori Iwasaki	Japan	14.31	
	?	Ma Weiliang	China	?	
	?	Gianni Tozzi	Italy	?	

=== Final ===
Held on 3 September

Wind: -0.7 m/s

Rank	Athlete	Nationality	Time	Notes
1st place, gold medalist(s)	Cletus Clark	United States	13.57	
2nd place, silver medalist(s)	György Bakos	Hungary	13.72	
3rd place, bronze medalist(s)	Keith Talley	United States	13.76	
4	Carlos Sala	Spain	13.82	
5	Liviu Giurgian	Romania	13.90	
6	Vyacheslav Ustinov	Soviet Union	13.96	
7	Michael Radzey	West Germany	14.09	
8	Pedro Chiamulera	Brazil	14.75	
