= Athletics at the 1983 Summer Universiade – Men's 110 metres hurdles =

The men's 110 metres hurdles event at the 1983 Summer Universiade was held at the Commonwealth Stadium in Edmonton, Canada on 10 and 11 July 1983.

== Medalists ==
| Gold | Silver | Bronze |
|---|---|---|
| Andrey Prokofyev; Soviet Union | Willie Gault; United States | Mark McKoy; Canada |

== Results ==
=== Heats ===
Wind:
Heat 1: +1.7 m/s, Heat 2: +0.4 m/s, Heat 3: +2.4 m/s

| Rank | Heat | Athlete | Nationality | Time | Notes |
|---|---|---|---|---|---|
| 1 | 3 | Jack Pierce | United States | 13.44 | Q |
| 2 | 3 | Andrey Prokofyev | Soviet Union | 13.46 | Q |
| 3 | 1 | Willie Gault | United States | 13.81 | Q |
| 4 | 1 | Anatoliy Titov | Soviet Union | 13.86 | Q |
| 5 | 2 | Romuald Giegiel | Poland | 13.87 | Q |
| 6 | 1 | Jacek Rutkowski | Poland | 13.89 | q |
| 7 | 1 | Michael Radzey | West Germany | 13.95 | q |
| 8 | 3 | Alex Schaumann | West Germany | 14.02 | |
| 9 | 3 | Jeffrey Glass | Canada | 14.03 | |
| 10 | 2 | Mark McKoy | Canada | 14.08 | Q |
| 11 | 1 | Rodrigo Casar | Mexico | 14.42 | |
| 12 | 2 | Wellington da Nóbrega | Brazil | 14.44 | |
| 13 | 3 | Mohamed Ryad Ben Haddad | Algeria | 14.49 | |
| 14 | 3 | Georgios Vamvakas | Greece | 14.83 | |
| 15 | 2 | Xu Zhiqian | China | 14.87 | |
| 16 | 2 | Mohamud Abousaowel | Libya | 17.18 | |
| | 2 | Roberto Schneider | Switzerland | DNF | |

=== Final ===
Wind: +0.3 m/s

| Rank | Athlete | Nationality | Time | Notes |
|---|---|---|---|---|
| 1st place, gold medalist(s) | Andrey Prokofyev | Soviet Union | 13.46 | |
| 2nd place, silver medalist(s) | Willie Gault | United States | 13.49 | |
| 3rd place, bronze medalist(s) | Mark McKoy | Canada | 13.57 | |
| 4 | Jack Pierce | United States | 13.66 | |
| 5 | Romuald Giegiel | Poland | 13.73 | |
| 6 | Anatoliy Titov | Soviet Union | 13.94 | |
| 7 | Jacek Rutkowski | Poland | 14.10 | |
| 8 | Michael Radzey | West Germany | 14.22 | |
