= 1987 European Athletics Indoor Championships – Men's 60 metres hurdles =

The men's 60 metres hurdles event at the 1987 European Athletics Indoor Championships was held on 22 February.

== Medalists ==
Gold	Silver	Bronze
Arto Bryggare; Finland	Colin Jackson; Great Britain	Nigel Walker; Great Britain

== Results ==
=== Heats ===
First 2 from each heat (Q) and the next 2 fastest (q) qualified for the semifinals.

Rank	Heat	Name	Nationality	Time	Notes
1	3	Arto Bryggare	Finland	7.61	Q
2	2	Colin Jackson	Great Britain	7.69	Q
3	3	Nigel Walker	Great Britain	7.75	Q
3	4	Jon Ridgeon	Great Britain	7.75	Q
3	5	Javier Moracho	Spain	7.75	Q
6	5	Philippe Aubert	France	7.76	Q
7	5	Jiří Hudec	Czechoslovakia	7.76	q
8	1	Aleksandr Markin	Soviet Union	7.78	Q
9	4	Ulf Söderman	Sweden	7.80	Q
10	5	Luigi Bertocchi	Italy	7.81	q
11	3	Liviu Giurgian	Romania	7.83	
12	2	Krzysztof Płatek	Poland	7.84	Q
13	1	György Bakos	Hungary	7.86	Q
13	4	Philippe Tourret	France	7.86	
15	3	Jean-Marc Muster	Switzerland	7.90	
16	2	Mikael Ylöstalo	Finland	7.91	
16	4	Robert Kurnicki	Poland	7.91	
18	4	Aleš Höffer	Czechoslovakia	7.92	
19	4	Fausto Frigerio	Italy	7.93	
20	1	Olivier Vallaeys	France	7.99	
21	3	Christof Bagus	West Germany	8.03	
22	3	Roland Marloye	Belgium	8.03	
23	2	Stefan Mattern	West Germany	8.21	
24	2	Ali Aksu	Turkey	8.59	
25	1	Thomas Christen	Switzerland	10.19	
	2	Emiel Mellaard	Netherlands	DQ	
	5	Rik Folens	Belgium	DNF	
	1	Carlos Sala	Spain	DNS	
	5	Petter Hesselberg	Norway	DNS	

=== Semifinals ===
First 3 from each semifinal qualified directly (Q) for the final.

Rank	Heat	Name	Nationality	Time	Notes
1	2	Arto Bryggare	Finland	7.56	Q, NR
2	1	Colin Jackson	Great Britain	7.57	Q
3	2	Jon Ridgeon	Great Britain	7.60	Q
4	1	Nigel Walker	Great Britain	7.66	Q
4	2	Jiří Hudec	Czechoslovakia	7.66	Q
6	1	György Bakos	Hungary	7.67	Q
7	1	Aleksandr Markin	Soviet Union	7.72	
8	1	Javier Moracho	Spain	7.72	
9	1	Ulf Söderman	Sweden	7.83	
10	2	Krzysztof Płatek	Poland	7.84	
11	2	Philippe Aubert	France	7.87	
12	2	Luigi Bertocchi	Italy	8.07	

=== Final ===
Rank	Name	Nationality	Time	Notes
1st place, gold medalist(s)	Arto Bryggare	Finland	7.59	
2nd place, silver medalist(s)	Colin Jackson	Great Britain	7.63	
3rd place, bronze medalist(s)	Nigel Walker	Great Britain	7.65	
4	Jon Ridgeon	Great Britain	7.71	
5	György Bakos	Hungary	7.74	
	Jiří Hudec	Czechoslovakia	DNF	
