= 1988 European Athletics Indoor Championships – Men's 60 metres hurdles =

The men's 60 metres hurdles event at the 1988 European Athletics Indoor Championships was held on 6 March.

== Medalists ==
Gold	Silver	Bronze
Aleš Höffer; Czechoslovakia	Jon Ridgeon; Great Britain	Carlos Sala; Spain

== Results ==
=== Heats ===
First 2 from each heat (Q) and the next 4 fastest (q) qualified for the semifinals.

Rank	Heat	Name	Nationality	Time	Notes
1	3	Aleš Höffer	Czechoslovakia	7.69	Q
1	4	Jon Ridgeon	Great Britain	7.69	Q
3	3	Sergey Usov	Soviet Union	7.73	Q
4	3	Andreas Oschkenat	East Germany	7.73	q
5	1	Florian Schwarthoff	West Germany	7.74	Q
6	4	Javier Moracho	Spain	7.77	Q
7	1	Philippe Tourret	France	7.78	Q
8	4	Alain Cuypers	Belgium	7.82	q
9	1	Antonio Lanau	Spain	7.93	q
10	4	Herwig Röttl	Austria	7.94	q
11	1	Steve Buckeridge	Great Britain	7.97	
12	3	Fausto Frigerio	Italy	8.01	
13	4	Gianni Tozzi	Italy	8.02	
14	3	Neil Fraser	Great Britain	8.08	
15	2	Michael Radzey	West Germany	8.11	Q
16	2	Carlos Sala	Spain	8.14	Q
17	4	Jürgen Schoch	West Germany	8.19	

=== Semifinals ===
First 3 from each semifinal qualified directly (Q) for the final.

Rank	Heat	Name	Nationality	Time	Notes
1	1	Jon Ridgeon	Great Britain	7.60	Q
2	2	Aleš Höffer	Czechoslovakia	7.66	Q
3	2	Florian Schwarthoff	West Germany	7.66	Q
4	1	Javier Moracho	Spain	7.72	Q
5	1	Sergey Usov	Soviet Union	7.73	Q
5	2	Carlos Sala	Spain	7.73	Q
7	1	Philippe Tourret	France	7.74	
7	2	Andreas Oschkenat	East Germany	7.74	
9	2	Alain Cuypers	Belgium	7.81	
10	1	Herwig Röttl	Austria	7.90	
11	2	Antonio Lanau	Spain	8.04	
	1	Michael Radzey	West Germany	DNS	

=== Final ===
Rank	Lane	Name	Nationality	Time	Notes
1st place, gold medalist(s)	4	Aleš Höffer	Czechoslovakia	7.56	NR
2nd place, silver medalist(s)	2	Jon Ridgeon	Great Britain	7.57	
3rd place, bronze medalist(s)	1	Carlos Sala	Spain	7.67	
4	6	Sergey Usov	Soviet Union	7.67	
5	5	Florian Schwarthoff	West Germany	7.77	
6	3	Javier Moracho	Spain	7.83	
