= 1984 European Athletics Indoor Championships – Men's 60 metres hurdles =

The men's 60 metres hurdles event at the 1984 European Athletics Indoor Championships was held on 4 March.

== Medalists ==
Gold	Silver	Bronze
Romuald Giegiel; Poland	György Bakos; Hungary	Jiří Hudec; Czechoslovakia

== Results ==
=== Heats ===
First 3 from each heat (Q) and the next 2 fastest (q) qualified for the final.

Rank	Heat	Name	Nationality	Time	Notes
1	2	Romuald Giegiel	Poland	7.72	Q
2	1	György Bakos	Hungary	7.79	Q
3	1	Daniele Fontecchio	Italy	7.82	Q
3	1	Wojciech Zawiła	Poland	7.82	Q
3	2	Javier Moracho	Spain	7.82	Q
3	2	Jiří Hudec	Czechoslovakia	7.82	Q
7	1	Reijo Byman	Finland	7.94	q
8	2	Jürgen Schoch	West Germany	7.95	q
9	2	Georg Präst	Italy	7.95	
10	1	Herbert Kreiner	Austria	8.21	
11	2	Petter Hesselberg	Norway	8.23	
12	2	Peter Bergh	Sweden	8.39	
13	1	Gísli Sigurðsson	Iceland	8.51	
14	1	Carlos Sala	Spain	9.48	

=== Final ===
Rank	Name	Nationality	Time	Notes
1st place, gold medalist(s)	Romuald Giegiel	Poland	7.62	NR
2nd place, silver medalist(s)	György Bakos	Hungary	7.75	
3rd place, bronze medalist(s)	Jiří Hudec	Czechoslovakia	7.77	
4	Javier Moracho	Spain	7.78	
5	Daniele Fontecchio	Italy	7.81	
6	Wojciech Zawiła	Poland	7.88	
7	Jürgen Schoch	West Germany	8.02	
8	Reijo Byman	Finland	8.03	
