= 1983 World Championships in Athletics – Men's 110 metres hurdles =

Men's 110 metres hurdles at the 1983 World Championships
- Venue: Helsinki Olympic Stadium
- Dates: 11 August (heats); 11 August (semi-finals); 12 August (final)
- Competitors: 28
- Winning time: 13.42

Medalists
gold medal	Greg Foster	United States
silver medal	Arto Bryggare	Finland
bronze medal	Willie Gault	United States

These are the official results of the men's 110 metres hurdles event at the 1983 IAAF World Championships in Helsinki, Finland. There were a total number of 28 participating athletes, with four qualifying heats, two semi-finals and the final held on 12 August 1983.

== Records ==
Existing records at the start of the event.

World Record	Renaldo Nehemiah (USA)	12.93	Zürich, Switzerland	August 19, 1981
Championship Record	New event			

== Results ==
=== Qualifying heats ===
The qualifying heats took place on 11 August, with the 28 athletes involved being split into 4 heats. The first 3 athletes in each heat ( Q ) and the next 4 fastest ( q ) qualified for the semifinals.

Wind: Heat 1: +1.1 m/s, Heat 2: +1.9 m/s, Heat 3: +1.9 m/s, Heat 4: +2.1 m/s

Heat 1

Rank	Name	Nationality	Time	Notes
1	Mark McKoy	Canada	13.53	Q, CR
2	Thomas Munkelt	East Germany	13.61	Q
3	Ventsislav Radev	Bulgaria	13.78	Q
4	Mark Holtom	Great Britain & N.I.	13.85	q
5	Béla Bodó	Hungary	13.91	q
6	Modesto Castillo	Dominican Republic	13.93	q
7	Tim Soper	New Zealand	14.28	

Heat 2

Rank	Name	Nationality	Time	Notes
1	Arto Bryggare	Finland	13.44	Q, CR
2	Willie Gault	United States	13.66	Q
3	Alejandro Casañas	Cuba	13.70	Q
4	Liviu Giurgian	Romania	13.98	
5	Stéphane Caristan	France	14.10	
6	Julius Ivan	Czechoslovakia	14.28	
7	Gary Bullard	Bahamas	14.31	

Heat 3

Rank	Name	Nationality	Time	Notes
1	Greg Foster	United States	13.41	Q, CR
2	György Bakos	Hungary	13.61	Q
3	Javier Moracho	Spain	13.62	Q
4	Andreas Oschkenat	East Germany	13.80	q
5	Ion Oltean	Romania	13.97	
6	Yu Zhicheng	China	14.43	
7	San Chai Kim	Cambodia	16.26	

Heat 4

Rank	Name	Nationality	Time	Notes
1	Sam Turner	United States	13.62w	Q
2	Don Wright	Australia	13.70w	Q
3	Andrey Prokofyev	Soviet Union	13.90w	Q
4	Daniele Fontecchio	Italy	14.05w	
5	Wu Chin-jing	Chinese Taipei	14.24w	
6	Axel Schaumann	West Germany	14.40w	
7	Daniel Ololo	Gabon	14.93 w	

=== Semifinals ===
The semifinals took place on 12 August, with the 16 athletes involved being split into 2 heats. The first 4 athletes in each heat ( Q ) qualified for the final.

Wind: Heat 1: +0.9 m/s, Heat 2: –0.7 m/s

Heat 1

Rank	Name	Nationality	Time	Notes
1	Greg Foster	United States	13.22	Q, CR
2	Willie Gault	United States	13.48	Q
3	Thomas Munkelt	East Germany	13.62	Q
4	György Bakos	Hungary	13.66	Q
5	Andrey Prokofyev	Soviet Union	13.76	
6	Mark Holtom	Great Britain & N.I.	13.79	
7	Modesto Castillo	Dominican Republic	14.23	
	Alejandro Casañas	Cuba		DNS

Heat 2

Rank	Name	Nationality	Time	Notes
1	Arto Bryggare	Finland	13.50	Q
2	Sam Turner	United States	13.65	Q
3	Mark McKoy	Canada	13.73	Q
4	Ventsislav Radev	Bulgaria	13.82	Q
5	Javier Moracho	Spain	13.92	
6	Andreas Oschkenat	East Germany	13.93	
7	Don Wright	Australia	14.28	
	Béla Bodó	Hungary		DNS

=== Final ===
The final took place on August 12.

Wind: +1.3 m/s

Rank	Name	Nationality	Time	Notes
1st place, gold medalist(s)	Greg Foster	United States	13.42	
2nd place, silver medalist(s)	Arto Bryggare	Finland	13.46	
3rd place, bronze medalist(s)	Willie Gault	United States	13.48	
4	Mark McKoy	Canada	13.56	
5	Thomas Munkelt	East Germany	13.66	
6	György Bakos	Hungary	13.68	
7	Ventsislav Radev	Bulgaria	13.73	
8	Sam Turner	United States	13.82	
