= 1986 World Junior Championships in Athletics – Men's 400 metres hurdles =

The men's 400 metres hurdles event at the 1986 World Junior Championships in Athletics was held in Athens, Greece, at Olympic Stadium on 16, 17 and 18 July.

== Medalists ==
Gold	Emilio Valle; Cuba
Silver	Hiroshi Kakimori; Japan
Bronze	Pascal Maran; France

== Results ==
=== Final ===
18 July

Rank	Name	Nationality	Time	Notes
1st place, gold medalist(s)	Emilio Valle	Cuba	50.02	
2nd place, silver medalist(s)	Hiroshi Kakimori	Japan	50.09	
3rd place, bronze medalist(s)	Pascal Maran	France	50.39	
4	Carsten Köhrbrück	West Germany	50.58	
5	Alain Cuypers	Belgium	50.67	
6	Nikolay Boiko	Soviet Union	50.87	
7	Dolph Francis	Australia	51.69	
	Joseph Maritim	Kenya	DNF	

=== Semifinals ===
17 July

==== Semifinal 1 ====
Rank	Name	Nationality	Time	Notes
1	Hiroshi Kakimori	Japan	50.05	Q
2	Emilio Valle	Cuba	50.39	Q
3	Alain Cuypers	Belgium	50.51	Q
4	Nikolay Boiko	Soviet Union	50.57	Q
5	Stéphane Leger	France	51.90	
6	Andrzej Nowak	Poland	52.38	
7	Kevin Mason	United States	53.17	
	Valeriy Kosobokov	Soviet Union	DNS	

==== Semifinal 2 ====
Rank	Name	Nationality	Time	Notes
1	Joseph Maritim	Kenya	50.27	Q
2	Dolph Francis	Australia	50.72	Q
3	Pascal Maran	France	50.99	Q
4	Carsten Köhrbrück	West Germany	51.12	Q
5	Róbert Bágyi	Hungary	51.23	
6	Philip Hughes	Canada	52.38	
7	Michael Graham	United States	53.22	
	Herwig Röttl	Austria	DNS	

=== Heats ===
16 July

==== Heat 1 ====
Rank	Name	Nationality	Time	Notes
1	Joseph Maritim	Kenya	50.70	Q
2	Alain Cuypers	Belgium	51.29	Q
3	Stéphane Leger	France	52.28	Q
4	Constantin Popescu	Romania	52.64	
5	Gianni Floridia	Italy	53.02	
6	Jorge Guevara	Mexico	54.78	
7	Yasser Abdulrahman Fallatah Kadhy	Saudi Arabia	57.30	

==== Heat 2 ====
Rank	Name	Nationality	Time	Notes
1	Pascal Maran	France	51.12	Q
2	Carsten Köhrbrück	West Germany	51.48	Q
3	Róbert Bágyi	Hungary	51.62	Q
4	Dolph Francis	Australia	52.01	q
5	Takahiro Matsuhisa	Japan	52.89	
6	Khaled Abdullah Hassan	Bahrain	52.99	
7	Daniel Velázquez	Puerto Rico	53.85	

==== Heat 3 ====
Rank	Name	Nationality	Time	Notes
1	Kevin Mason	United States	51.90	Q
2	Nikolay Boiko	Soviet Union	52.20	Q
3	Herwig Röttl	Austria	52.29	Q
4	Antonio Smith	Venezuela	52.42	
5	Emil Peshev	Bulgaria	52.48	
6	Yehuda Moreli	Israel	53.96	
7	Stelios Bisbas	Greece	55.30	

==== Heat 4 ====
Rank	Name	Nationality	Time	Notes
1	Hiroshi Kakimori	Japan	50.61	Q
2	Emilio Valle	Cuba	51.12	Q
3	Philip Hughes	Canada	52.41	Q
4	Pel van de Kerkhof	Netherlands	53.19	
5	Mark Langmuir	Australia	53.41	
6	Oliver Ciesla	West Germany	55.12	
7	Roberto Mobarec	Bolivia	56.15	
8	Vasilios Archondidis	Greece	56.38	

==== Heat 5 ====
Rank	Name	Nationality	Time	Notes
1	Andrzej Nowak	Poland	51.93	Q
2	Valeriy Kosobokov	Soviet Union	52.04	Q
3	Michael Graham	United States	52.14	Q
4	Michele Carrozza	Italy	52.60	
5	Allan Ince	Barbados	52.63	
6	Augustus Lawson	Ghana	54.66	
7	Ralph Carter	Canada	54.73	
8	Tarek Khamis Dabouss	United Arab Emirates	59.14	

== Participation ==
According to an unofficial count, 37 athletes from 28 countries participated in the event.

- Australia (2)
- Austria (1)
- Bahrain (1)
- Barbados (1)
- Belgium (1)
- Bolivia (1)
- Bulgaria (1)
- Canada (2)
- Cuba (1)
- France (2)
- Ghana (1)
- Greece (2)
- Hungary (1)
- Israel (1)
- Italy (2)
- Japan (2)
- Kenya (1)
- Mexico (1)
- Netherlands (1)
- Poland (1)
- Puerto Rico (1)
- Romania (1)
- Saudi Arabia (1)
- Soviet Union (2)
- United Arab Emirates (1)
- United States (2)
- Venezuela (1)
- West Germany (2)
