= Jürgen Schoch =

German hurdler (born 1962)

Personal information
- Born: 10 April 1962 (age 64)

Sport
- Sport: Track and field

Jürgen Schoch (born 10 April 1962) is a retired West German hurdler.

He finished seventh at the 1984 European Indoor Championships. He also competed at the 1983 and 1988 European Indoor Championships without reaching the final.

He became West German indoor champion in the 60 metres hurdles in 1985. In the West German championships he won three silver medals and one bronze medal, behind a different victor every time; Axel Schaumann, Peter Scholz, Michael Radzey and Florian Schwarthoff. He represented the club SV Salamander Kornwestheim.

His personal best times were 7.71 seconds in the 60 metres hurdles, achieved in January 1988 in Karlsruhe; and 13.78 seconds in the 110 metres hurdles, achieved in July 1988 in Frankfurt.
