= Liviu Giurgian =

Romanian hurdler (1962–2017)

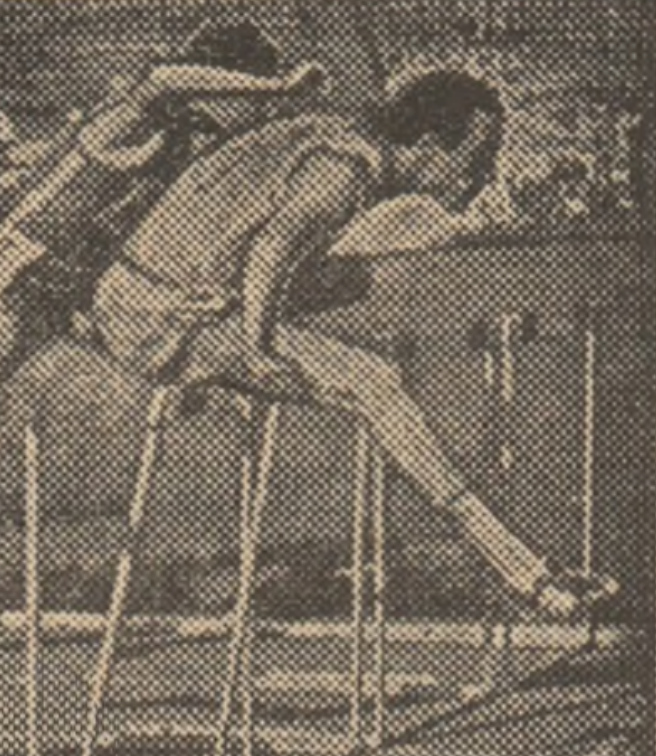

Personal information
- Born: 26 July 1962
- Died: 12 July 2017 (aged 54)

Sport
- Sport: Athletics
- Events: 110 m hurdles, 60 m hurdles

Liviu Giurgian (26 July 1962 – 12 July 2017) was a Romanian athlete who specialised in the sprint hurdles. He represented his country at two outdoor and two indoor World Championships.

His personal bests were 13.47 seconds in the 110 metres hurdles (+0.9 m/s, Bucharest 1986) and 7.53 seconds in the 60 metres hurdles (Bacau 1988).

== International competitions ==
Year	Competition	Venue	Position	Event	Notes
Representing Romania
1981	European Junior Championships	Utrecht, Netherlands	4th	110 m hurdles	14.15
1983	World Championships	Helsinki, Finland	18th (h)	110 m hurdles	13.98
1985	Universiade	Kobe, Japan	5th	110 m hurdles	13.90
1986	European Indoor Championships	Madrid, Spain	5th	60 m hurdles	7.74
1986	Goodwill Games	Moscow, Soviet Union	–	110 m hurdles	DNF
1986	European Championships	Stuttgart, West Germany	7th	110 m hurdles	13.71
1987	European Indoor Championships	Liévin, France	11th (h)	60 m hurdles	7.83
1987	World Indoor Championships	Indianapolis, United States	14th (h)	60 m hurdles	8.05
1989	World Indoor Championships	Budapest, Hungary	13th (h)	60 m hurdles	7.84
1990	European Indoor Championships	Glasgow, United Kingdom	12th (sf)	60 m hurdles	7.84
1991	World Championships	Tokyo, Japan	12th (sf)	110 m hurdles	13.82
