= Thomas Dittrich =

German hurdler (born 1954)

Personal information
- Nationality: German
- Born: 19 August 1954 (age 71) Zwickau, Bezirk Karl-Marx-Stadt, East Germany

Sport
- Sport: Track and field
- Event: 110 metres hurdles

Thomas Dittrich (born 19 August 1954) is a German hurdler. He competed in the men's 110 metres hurdles at the 1980 Summer Olympics, representing East Germany.
