= Aleš Höffer =

Czech hurdler

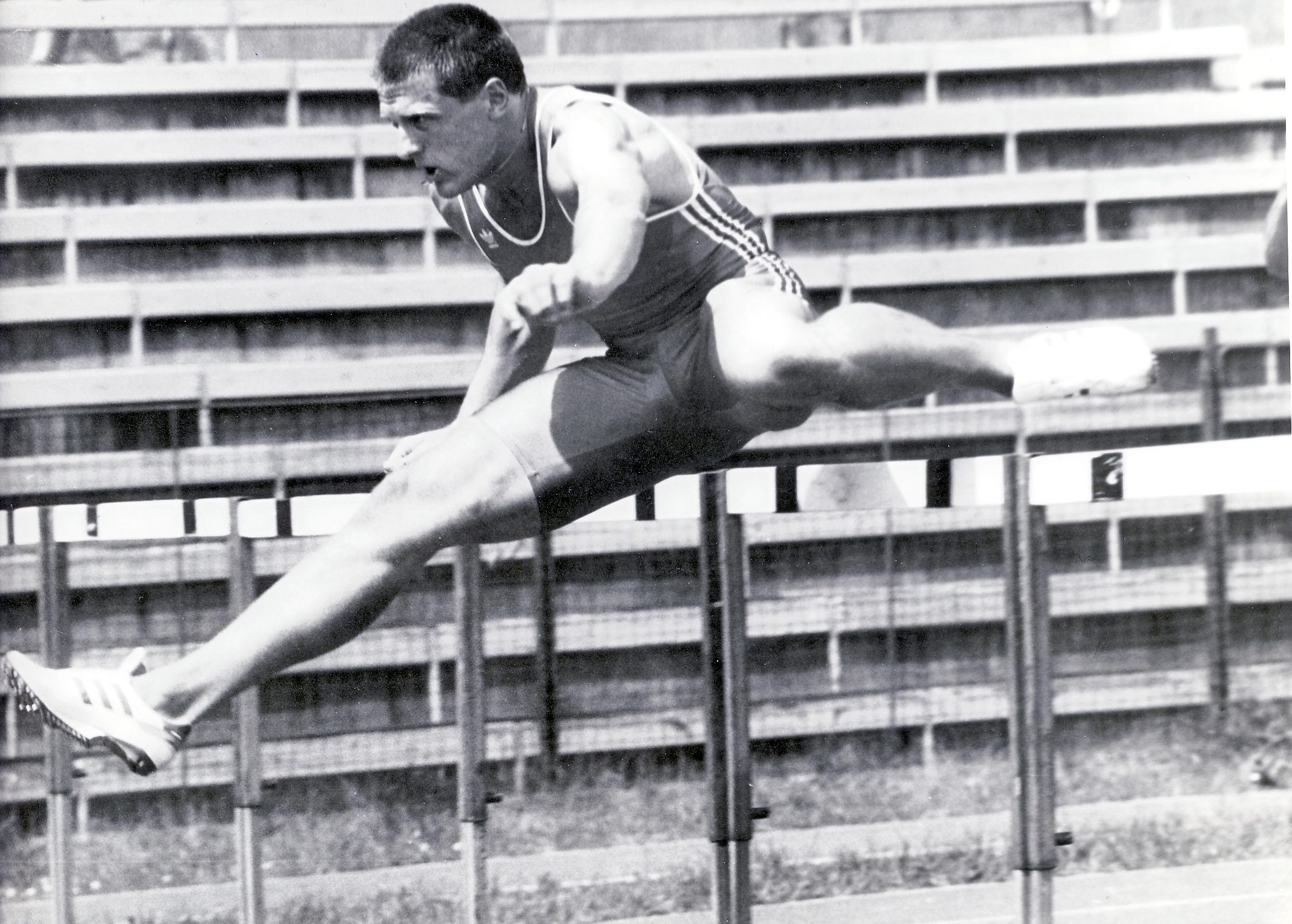
- Aleš Höffer in 1988

Personal information
- Born: 9 December 1962 Prague, Czechoslovakia
- Died: 14 December 2008 (aged 46)

Sport
- Sport: Athletics
- Event(s): 110 m hurdles, 60 m hurdles
- Club: Slavia IPS; USK
- Coached by: Jan Pospíšil

Aleš Höffer (9 December 1962 – 14 December 2008) was a Czech athlete who represented Czechoslovakia in the sprint hurdles. He is best known for winning the gold medal at the 1988 European Indoor Championships. He also represented his country at the 1987 World Championships reaching the semifinals.

His personal bests were 13.53 seconds in the 110 metres hurdles (+1.4 m/s; Moscow 1987) and 7.56 seconds in the 60 metres hurdles (Budapest 1988).

== Life ==
Aleš Höffer was born on 9 December 1962 in Prague.

== International competitions ==
Year	Competition	Venue	Position	Event	Notes
Representing Czechoslovakia
1984	Friendship Games	Moscow, Soviet Union	11th (h)	110 m hurdles	13.95
1985	European Indoor Championships	Piraeus, Greece	13th (h)	60 m hurdles	7.90
1987	European Indoor Championships	Liévin, France	18th (h)	60 m hurdles	7.92
1987	World Championships	Rome, Italy	13th (sf)	110 m hurdles	13.78
1988	European Indoor Championships	Budapest, Hungary	1st	60 m hurdles	7.56
1989	European Indoor Championships	The Hague, Netherlands	8th	60 m hurdles	7.84
1990	European Indoor Championships	Glasgow, United Kingdom	24th (h)	60 m hurdles	8.50
