= Vyacheslav Korovin =

Russian former track and field athlete (born 1962)

Vyacheslav Korovin (Russian: Вячеслав Коровин; born 8 September 1962) is a Russian former track and field athlete who competed in the hammer throw for the Soviet Union. He ranks within the all-time top thirty for the event, as of 2016.

The sole international medal of his career came at the 1981 European Athletics Junior Championships, where he threw 68.36 m (224 ft 3 1/4 in) to take the bronze medal behind Christoph Sahner and Sergey Dorozhon. His greatest achievement came in the 1987 season when he threw a career best of 82.24 m (269 ft 9 3/4 in) in Chelyabinsk. This ranked him third in the world that year behind fellow Soviets Sergey Litvinov and Igor Astapkovich – both of whom were Olympic medallists. This proved to be a brief peak for Korovin as he did not break eighty metres again and his next highest ranking was twelfth in the 1989 season.
