= Ulf Söderman =

Swedish former athlete (born 1963)

Personal information
- Born: 18 March 1963 (age 63)

Sport
- Sport: Athletics
- Events: 110 m hurdles, 60 m hurdles
- Club: IK Hakarpspojkarna; Malmö AI

Ulf Söderman (born 18 March 1963) is a Swedish former athlete who competed in the sprint hurdles. He represented his country at one outdoor and two indoor World Championships.

His personal bests are 13.78 seconds in the 110 metres hurdles (+1.3 m/s; Duisburg 1989) and 7.80 seconds in the 60 metres hurdles (Oslo 1987).

== International competitions ==
Year	Competition	Venue	Position	Event	Notes
Representing Sweden
1985	European Indoor Championships	Piraeus, Greece	20th (h)	60 m hurdles	8.04
1986	European Championships	Stuttgart, West Germany	14th (sf)	110 m hurdles	13.94
1987	European Indoor Championships	Liévin, France	9th (sf)	60 m hurdles	7.83
1987	World Indoor Championships	Indianapolis, United States	10th (h)	60 m hurdles	7.84
1987	World Championships	Rome, Italy	25th (h)	110 m hurdles	14.01
1989	European Indoor Championships	The Hague, Netherlands	17th (h)	60 m hurdles	7.90
1989	World Indoor Championships	Budapest, Hungary	17th (h)	60 m hurdles	7.98
1989	Universiade	Duisburg, West Germany	11th (sf)	110 m hurdles	13.86
1990	European Indoor Championships	Glasgow, United Kingdom	17th (h)	60 m hurdles	7.90
