= 1981 European Athletics Junior Championships =

- Level: Under 20
- Events: 38

The 1981 European Athletics Junior Championships was the sixth edition of the biennial athletics competition for European athletes aged under twenty. It was held in Utrecht, Netherlands between 20 and 23 August.

== Men's results ==
Event	Gold		Silver		Bronze	
100 metres	Thomas Schröder (GDR)	10.14	Rolf Kistner (FRG)	10.33	Pierfrancesco Pavoni (ITA)	10.39
200 metres	Thomas Schröder (GDR)	20.69	Sergey Sokolov (URS)	20.79	Kimmo Saaristo (FIN)	20.83
400 metres	Todd Bennett (GBR)	47.18	Jens Carlowitz (GDR)	47.40	Jörg Vaihinger (FRG)	47.48
800 metres	József Bereczki (HUN)	1:46.17	István Szalai (HUN)	1:46.94	Chris McGeorge (GBR)	1:47.43
1500 metres	Steffen Ohme (GDR)	3:44.24	Didier Poirier (FRA)	3:44.49	Anatoliy Legeda (URS)	3:44.66
3000 metres	Rainer Wachenbrunner (GDR)	7:57.18	Frank Heine (GDR)	7:59.05	Jean-Pierre N'dayisenga (BEL)	8:01.30
5000 metres	Gábor Szabó (HUN)	13:56.42	Salvatore Antibo (ITA)	14:03.73	Axel Krippschock (GDR)	14:05.02
110 m hurdles	Holger Pohland (GDR)	13.80	Andreas Oschkenat (GDR)	13.85	Viktor Batrachenko (URS)	14.10
400 m hurdles	Krasimir Demirev (BUL)	50.45	Olivier Gui (FRA)	50.63	Hans-Jürgen Ende (GDR)	50.75
2000 m s'chase	Paul Davies-Hale (GBR)	5:31.12	Gilbert Jüchert (GDR)	5:38.02	Lev Glinskikh (URS)	5:38.61
10,000 m walk	Ralf Kowalski (GDR)	39:56.23	Aleksandr Potashov (URS)	41:39.35	Viktor Mostovik (URS)	41:46.56
4 × 100 m relay	East Germany (GDR); Karsten Weller; Steffen Bringmann; Andreas Oschkenat; Thomas Schröder	39.88	Soviet Union (URS); Sergey Polishchuk; Sergey Sokolov; Aleksandr Sivchenko; Ivan Svyatnenko	40.21	Finland (FIN); Juha Pyy; Jouni Törrönen; Ilari Jauro; Kimmo Saaristo	40.58
4 × 400 m relay	East Germany (GDR); Uwe Preusche; Frank Löper; Eckard Trylus; Jens Carlowitz	3:04.58	Great Britain (GBR); John Weston; Eugene Gilkes; Paul Dunn; Todd Bennett	3:07.49	West Germany (FRG); Markus Söhnge; Matthias Kaulin; Heiko Emde; Jörg Vaihinger	3:07.91
High jump	Krzysztof Krawczyk (POL)	2.26 m	William Motti (FRA)	2.19 m	Oleg Azizmuradov (URS)	2.19 m
Pole vault	Frantisek Jansa (TCH)	5.35 m	Pierre Quinon (FRA)	5.30 m	Olaf Kasten (GDR)	5.25 m
Long jump	André Reichelt (GDR)	7.76 m	Sergey Rodin (URS)	7.73 m	Andreas Zwanzig (GDR)	7.70 m
Triple jump	Sergey Akhvlediani (URS)	16.76 m	Aleksandr Leonov (URS)	16.54 m	Mike Makin (GBR)	15.95 m
Shot put	Andreas Horn (GDR)	18.71 m	Ulf Timmermann (GDR)	18.45 m	Karsten Stolz (FRG)	17.77 m
Discus throw	Kamen Dimitrov (BUL)	56.62 m	Thomas Christel (GDR)	56.12 m	Erik de Bruin (NED)	55.88 m
Hammer throw	Christoph Sahner (FRG)	68.92 m	Sergey Dorozhon (URS)	68.48 m	Vyacheslav Korovin (URS)	68.36 m
Javelin throw	Uwe Hohn (GDR)	86.56 m	Roald Bradstock (GBR)	79.18 m	Fabio Michielon (ITA)	75.26 m
Decathlon	Mikhail Romanyuk (URS)	7918 pts	Torsten Voss (GDR)	7912 pts	Sven Reintak (URS)	7497 pts

== Women's results ==
Event	Gold		Silver		Bronze	
100 metres	Katrin Böhme (GDR)	11.33	Shirley Thomas (GBR)	11.43	Carola Beuster (GDR)	11.50
200 metres	Sabine Rieger (GDR)	22.91	Valentina Bozhina (URS)	23.13	Carola Beuster (GDR)	23.31
400 metres	Irina Zhdanova (URS)	53.21	Heike Bohne (GDR)	53.54	Linsey MacDonald (GBR)	54.24
800 metres	Ines Vogelgesang (GDR)	2:02.65	Anna Rybicka (POL)	2:03.83	Lyubov Kiryukhina (URS)	2:04.33
1500 metres	Betty Van Steenbroeck (BEL)	4:15.75	Melena Malykhina (URS)	4:17.31	Kirsti Voldnes (NOR)	4:18.72
3000 metres	Lyudmila Sudak (URS)	8:58.30	Birgit Mauer (GDR)	9:20.01	Uta Möckel (GDR)	9:22.00
100 m hurdles	Katrin Böhme (GDR)	13.20	Gloria Kovarik (GDR)	13.27	Anne Piquereau (FRA)	13.76
400 m hurdles	Sylvia Kirschner (GDR)	56.41	Anita Lauvensteins (URS)	56.93	Margarita Ponomaryova (URS)	57.45
4 × 100 m relay	East Germany (GDR); Silke Gladisch; Sabine Rieger; Kathrin Böhme; Carola Beuster	43.77	France (FRA); Véronique Ponchot; Marie-Christine Cazier; Laurence Bily; Marie-France Loval	44.61	West Germany (FRG); Andrea Niggemann; Anne Griese; Andrea Hannemann; Andrea Bersch	45.11
4 × 400 m relay	East Germany (GDR); Cornelia Feuerbach; Carola Witzel; Ines Vogelgesang; Heike Bohne	3:30.39	Soviet Union (URS); Irina Zakharova; Lyubov Kiryukhina; Margarita Ponomaryova; Irina Zhdanova	3:31.41	West Germany (FRG); Anne Griese; Sylvia Nagel; Kirsten Fuhrken; Silke Kondziella	3:36.90
High jump	Andrea Breder (FRG)	1.90 m	Alessandra Fossati (ITA)	1.88 m	Larissa Kossytsina (URS)	1.86 m
Long jump	Heike Daute (GDR)	7.02 m	Yelena Lugovaya (URS)	6.43 m	Joyce Oladapo (GBR)	6.36 m
Shot put	Konstanze Simm (GDR)	17.21 m	Gabriele Reinsch (GDR)	17.03 m	Svetla Mitkova (BUL)	16.50 m
Discus throw	Diana Sachse (GDR)	57.30 m	Svetla Mitkova (BUL)	55.60 m	Larisa Mikhalchenko (URS)	53.38 m
Javelin throw	Antoaneta Todorova (BUL)	64.12 m	Antje Kempe (GDR)	60.60 m	Karin Bergdahl (SWE)	58.40 m
Heptathlon	Anke Tröger (GDR)	6032 pts	Ilona Dietze (GDR)	5991 pts	Tatyana Stoycheva (BUL)	5764 pts

== Medal table ==
Rank	Nation	Gold	Silver	Bronze	Total
1	East Germany (GDR)	22	13	7	42
2	Soviet Union (URS)	4	11	11	26
3	Bulgaria (BUL)	3	1	2	6
4	Great Britain (GBR)	2	3	4	9
5	West Germany (FRG)	2	1	5	8
6	Hungary (HUN)	2	1	0	3
7	Poland (POL)	1	1	0	2
8	Belgium (BEL)	1	0	1	2
9	Czechoslovakia (TCH)	1	0	0	1
10	France (FRA)	0	5	1	6
11	Italy (ITA)	0	2	2	4
12	Finland (FIN)	0	0	2	2
13	Netherlands (NED)	0	0	1	1
13	Norway (NOR)	0	0	1	1
13	Sweden (SWE)	0	0	1	1
Totals (15 entries)		38	38	38	114
