= Alain Cuypers =

Belgian hurdler

Personal information
- Born: 29 November 1967 (age 58) Ostend, Belgium
- Height: 1.81 m (5 ft 11 in)
- Weight: 69 kg (152 lb)

Sport
- Sport: Athletics
- Events: 110 m hurdles, 400 m hurdles
- Club: AVT Hasselt
- Coached by: Bart Cleppe

Alain Cuypers (born 29 November 1967 in Ostend) is a Belgian retired hurdler. Competing in both the 110 and 400 metres hurdles, he represented his country at the 1988 Summer Olympics as well as two outdoor and two indoor World Championships.

He finished second behind Max Robertson in the 400 metres hurdles event at the British 1989 AAA Championships.

== International competitions ==
Year	Competition	Venue	Position	Event	Notes
Representing Belgium
1985	European Junior Championships	Cottbus, East Germany	18th (h)	110 m hurdles	14.80
1985	European Junior Championships	Cottbus, East Germany	8th	400 m hurdles	52.76
1986	World Junior Championships	Athens, Greece	5th	400 m hurdles	50.67
1986	World Junior Championships	Athens, Greece	10th (h)	4 × 400 m relay	3:09.77
1986	European Championships	Stuttgart, West Germany	21st (h)	400 m hurdles	51.27
1987	World Championships	Rome, Italy	–	110 m hurdles	DNF
1988	European Indoor Championships	Budapest, Hungary	9th (sf)	60 m hurdles	7.81
1988	Olympic Games	Seoul, South Korea	12th (sf)	110 m hurdles	13.92
1988	Olympic Games	Seoul, South Korea	13th (sf)	400 m hurdles	49.75
1989	European Indoor Championships	The Hague, Netherlands	21st (h)	60 m hurdles	7.93
1989	World Indoor Championships	Budapest, Hungary	23rd (h)	60 m hurdles	11.98
1991	World Championships	Tokyo, Japan	23rd (h)	400 m hurdles	50.21
1993	World Indoor Championships	Toronto, Ontario, Canada	17th (h)	60 m hurdles	7.86

== Personal bests ==
Outdoor

- 110 metres hurdles – 13.63 (-0.3 m/s, Brussels 1992)
- 400 metres hurdles – 49.53 (Brussels 1989)

Indoor

- 60 metres hurdles – 7.71 (Karlsruhe 1993)
