= Vyacheslav Ustinov =

Soviet hurdler

Personal information
- Born: 10 May 1957 (age 69)
- Height: 1.90 m (6 ft 3 in)
- Weight: 85 kg (187 lb)

Sport
- Sport: Athletics
- Events: 110 m hurdles, 60 m hurdles
Medal record
Representing Soviet Union
European Indoor Championships
Bronze medal – third place	1985 Piraeus	60m hurdles

Vyacheslav Ustinov (Russian: Вячеслав Устинов; born 10 May 1957) is a retired Russian/Soviet athlete who specialised in the sprint hurdles. He won a bronze medal at the Friendship Games, which were organised for countries boycotting the 1984 Summer Olympics. In addition, he won a bronze medal at the 1985 European Indoor Championships.

His personal bests are 13.57 seconds in the 110 metres hurdles (-0.6 m/s, Moscow 1984) and 7.60 seconds in the 60 metres hurdles (Chisinau 1985).

== International competitions ==
Year	Competition	Venue	Position	Event	Notes
Representing the Soviet Union
1983	European Indoor Championships	Budapest, Hungary	19th (h)	60 m hurdles	8.03
1984	Friendship Games	Moscow, Soviet Union	2nd	110 m hurdles	13.57
1985	World Indoor Games	Paris, France	5th	60 m hurdles	7.75
1985	European Indoor Championships	Piraeus, Greece	3rd	60 m hurdles	7.70
1985	Universiade	Kobe, Japan	6th	110 m hurdles	13.96
