= Reijo Byman =

Finnish hurdler

Personal information
- Born: 12 October 1955 (age 70) Sipoo, Finland

Sport
- Sport: Track and field

Reijo Byman (born 12 October 1955) is a Finnish former hurdler.

He reached the semi-final of the 1979 European Indoor Championships, the heats of the 1982 European Championships and finished eighth at the 1984 European Indoor Championships.

Byman became Finnish indoor champion in 1978 and 1984, but never outdoor champion owing to the dominance of Arto Bryggare in the event. Instead he won outdoor national championship silver medals in 1977, 1979, 1980, 1981, 1982 and 1983.

After retirement Byman has made a career as an educationalist at the University of Helsinki.
