= Axel Schaumann =

German hurdler (born 1961)

Axel Schaumann (born 4 July 1961 in Stuttgart) is a retired West German hurdler.

He finished fourth at the European Indoor Championships in both 1982 and 1983.

He became West German champion in 1983, representing the sports club LG Kappelberg.

== International competitions ==
Year	Competition	Venue	Position	Event	Notes
Representing West Germany
1982	European Indoor Championships	Milan, Italy	4th	60 m hurdles	7.82
1983	European Indoor Championships	Budapest, Hungary	4th	60 m hurdles	7.64
1983	World Championships	Helsinki, Finland	25th (h)	110 m hurdles	14.40
