= Athletics at the 1989 Summer Universiade – Men's 110 metres hurdles =

The men's 110 metres hurdles event at the 1989 Summer Universiade was held at the Wedaustadion in Duisburg on 29 and 30 August 1989.

== Medalists ==
Gold	Silver	Bronze
Roger Kingdom; United States	Emilio Valle; Cuba	Florian Schwarthoff; West Germany

== Results ==
=== Heats ===
Held on 29 August

Wind:
Heat 1: 0.0 m/s, Heat 2: +1.1 m/s, Heat 3: +1.3 m/s, Heat 4: +0.3 m/s, Heat 5: 0.0 m/s

Rank	Heat	Athlete	Nationality	Time	Notes
1	4	Roger Kingdom	United States	13.36	Q
2	2	Emilio Valle	Cuba	13.61	Q
2	5	Tomasz Nagórka	Poland	13.61	Q
4	3	Robert Reading	United States	13.62	Q
5	4	Dietmar Koszewski	West Germany	13.65	Q
6	1	Philippe Tourret	France	13.68	Q
7	5	Florian Schwarthoff	West Germany	13.70	Q
8	3	Kai Kyllönen	Finland	13.74	Q
9	2	Ulf Söderman	Sweden	13.78	Q
10	1	Jiří Hudec	Czechoslovakia	13.83	Q
11	1	Stelios Bisbas	Greece	13.84	q
12	1	Ángel Martín	Spain	13.89	q
13	2	Mikael Ylöstalo	Finland	13.90	q
14	3	Richard Bucknor	Jamaica	13.98	q
15	4	Dmitriy Buldov	Soviet Union	14.00	q
16	2	Krzysztof Płatek	Poland	14.03	q
17	1	Brett St. Louis	Great Britain	14.05	
18	5	Thierry Richard	France	14.05	
19	4	Thomas Weimann	Austria	14.08	
20	3	Ikechukwu Mbadugha	Nigeria	14.09	
21	2	Yang Guang	China	14.25	
22	3	Peter Eriksson	Sweden	14.30	
23	1	Michel Brodeur	Canada	14.33	
24	5	Thomas Zurlinden	Switzerland	14.41	
25	3	Grant McNeil	New Zealand	14.42	
26	5	Noureddine Tadjine	Algeria	14.42	
27	2	Paul Lloyd	New Zealand	14.48	
28	4	John Caliguri	Australia	14.59	
29	5	Moses Oyiki Orode	Nigeria	14.70	
30	4	Javier del Río	Peru	14.80	
31	4	Paulo Barrigana	Portugal	14.80	
32	1	Hero Prayogo	Indonesia	15.08	
33	3	Joe Ross	Canada	15.21	
34	5	Lam Wai Keung	Hong Kong	16.26	

=== Semifinals ===
Held on 29 August

Wind:
Heat 1: +0.6 m/s, Heat 2: +0.6 m/s

Rank	Heat	Athlete	Nationality	Time	Notes
1	2	Roger Kingdom	United States	13.32	Q
2	2	Emilio Valle	Cuba	13.34	Q
3	1	Florian Schwarthoff	West Germany	13.38	Q
4	1	Philippe Tourret	France	13.40	Q
5	1	Tomasz Nagórka	Poland	13.41	Q
6	1	Robert Reading	United States	13.51	q
7	2	Dietmar Koszewski	West Germany	13.57	Q
8	1	Mikael Ylöstalo	Finland	13.67	q
9	1	Jiří Hudec	Czechoslovakia	13.70	
10	1	Stelios Bisbas	Greece	13.85	
11	1	Dmitriy Buldov	Soviet Union	13.86	
11	2	Ulf Söderman	Sweden	13.86	
13	2	Richard Bucknor	Jamaica	13.96	
14	2	Kai Kyllönen	Finland	14.00	
15	2	Ángel Martín	Spain	14.02	
16	2	Krzysztof Płatek	Poland	14.12	

=== Final ===
Held on 30 August

Wind: -1.4 m/s

Rank	Athlete	Nationality	Time	Notes
1st place, gold medalist(s)	Roger Kingdom	United States	13.26	GR
2nd place, silver medalist(s)	Emilio Valle	Cuba	13.52	
3rd place, bronze medalist(s)	Florian Schwarthoff	West Germany	13.63	
4	Philippe Tourret	France	13.69	
5	Dietmar Koszewski	West Germany	13.70	
6	Robert Reading	United States	13.78	
7	Mikael Ylöstalo	Finland	13.95	
	Tomasz Nagórka	Poland	DNS	
