= Karl-Werner Dönges =

German hurdler (born 1958)

Medal record

Men's athletics

Representing West Germany

European Indoor Championships
Bronze medal – third place	1982 Milan	60 m hurdles

Karl-Werner Dönges (born 24 September 1958 in Völklingen) is a retired West German hurdler.

He won the bronze medal at the 1982 European Indoor Championships, finished seventh at the 1982 European Championships and also competed at the 1980 European Indoor Championships without reaching the final.

He became West German champion in 1979, 1981 and 1982. He represented the sports club VfL Sindelfingen.

His personal best times were 13.54 seconds in the 110 metres hurdles, achieved in September 1982 in Tokyo; and 50.33 seconds in the 400 metres hurdles, achieved in August 1982 in Stuttgart.
