= Krzysztof Płatek =

Polish hurdler

Personal information
- Born: 13 January 1962 (age 64) Strzelin, Poland
- Height: 1.87 m (6 ft 2 in)
- Weight: 75 kg (165 lb)

Sport
- Sport: Athletics
- Events: 110 m hurdles, 60 m hurdles
- Club: AZS Wrocław

Krzysztof Płatek (born 13 January 1962 in Strzelin) is a Polish former athlete who specialised in the sprint hurdles. He represented his country at the 1987 World Championships reaching the semifinals. He is also a two-time outdoor and one-time indoor national champion.

His personal bests are 13.61 seconds in the 110 metres hurdles (+1.7 m/s; Warsaw 1988) and 7.78 seconds in the 60 metres hurdles (Zabrze 1987).

== International competitions ==
Year	Competition	Venue	Position	Event	Notes
Representing Poland
1985	European Indoor Championships	Piraeus, Greece	18th (h)	60 m hurdles	7.97
1986	European Indoor Championships	Madrid, Spain	9th (h)	60 m hurdles	7.87
1987	European Indoor Championships	Liévin, France	10th (h)	60 m hurdles	7.84
1987	World Championships	Rome, Italy	11th (sf)	110 m hurdles	13.68
1989	Universiade	Duisburg, West Germany	16th (sf)	110 m hurdles	14.12
