= Luigi Bertocchi =

Italian hurdler (1965–2017)

Personal information
- Born: 10 June 1965 Bergamo, Italy
- Died: 17 November 2017 (aged 52)
- Height: 1.84 m (6 ft 0 in)
- Weight: 70 kg (154 lb)

Sport
- Sport: Athletics
- Event(s): 110 m hurdles, 60 m hurdles
- Club: Fiamme Gialle

Luigi "Jerry" Bertocchi (10 June 1965 - 17 November 2017) is an Italian former athlete who competed in the sprint hurdles. He represented his country at one outdoor and two indoor World Championships.

== Biography ==
His personal bests are 13.69 seconds in the 110 metres hurdles (+2.0 m/s; Potenza 1991) and 7.81 seconds in the 60 metres hurdles (Liévin 1987). He died in November 2017 of cancer.

== Achievements ==
| Year | Competition | Venue | Position | Event | Notes |
Representing Italy
| 1985 | World Indoor Games | Paris, France | 11th (sf) | 60 m hurdles | 8.09 |
| 1985 | European Indoor Championships | Piraeus, Greece | 13th (h) | 60 m hurdles | 7.90 |
| 1986 | European Indoor Championships | Madrid, Spain | 9th (h) | 60 m hurdles | 7.87 |
| 1987 | European Indoor Championships | Liévin, France | 12th (sf) | 60 m hurdles | 8.07 |
| 1987 | World Indoor Championships | Indianapolis, United States | 15th (h) | 60 m hurdles | 8.13 |
| 1987 | World Championships | Rome, Italy | 26th (h) | 110 m hurdles | 14.02 |
| 1987 | Mediterranean Games | Latakia, Syria | 5th | 110 m hurdles | 14.26 |
| 1991 | Mediterranean Games | Athens, Greece | 4th | 110 m hurdles | 13.79 |
| 1993 | Mediterranean Games | Narbonne, France | 5th | 110 m hurdles | 13.96 |
