= 1987 IAAF World Indoor Championships – Men's 60 metres hurdles =

The men's 60 metres hurdles event at the 1987 IAAF World Indoor Championships was held at the Hoosier Dome in Indianapolis on 6-8 March 1987.

The winning margin was 0.11 seconds, a record which stood until 2024 when Grant Holloway of the United States increased it to 0.14 seconds when he beat Lorenzo Simonelli of Italy.

== Medalists ==
Gold	Silver	Bronze
Tonie Campbell; United States	Stéphane Caristan; France	Nigel Walker; Great Britain

== Results ==
=== Heats ===
The first 2 of each heat (Q) and next 2 fastest (q) qualified for the final.

Rank	Heat	Name	Nationality	Time	Notes
1	2	Greg Foster	United States	7.46	Q, CR
2	1	Mark McKoy	Canada	7.56	Q
3	2	Colin Jackson	Great Britain	7.63	Q
4	3	Tonie Campbell	United States	7.64	Q
5	1	Arto Bryggare	Finland	7.66	Q
6	1	Nigel Walker	Great Britain	7.67	q
7	2	Javier Moracho	Spain	7.73	q
8	1	Andrew Parker	Jamaica	7.75	
9	3	Stéphane Caristan	France	7.77	Q
10	1	Ulf Söderman	Sweden	7.84	
10	3	György Bakos	Hungary	7.84	
12	3	Don Wright	Australia	7.90	
13	3	Carlos Sala	Spain	7.92	
14	2	Liviu Giurgian	Romania	8.05	
15	2	Luigi Bertocchi	Italy	8.13	
16	3	Judex Lefou	Mauritius	8.38	NR
17	2	Mauricio Carranza	El Salvador	9.01	NR
18	2	Hisham Makin Mohamed	Egypt	10.11	NR
	1	Marcelin Dally	Ivory Coast	DNS	

=== Final ===
Rank	Lane	Name	Nationality	Time	Notes
1st place, gold medalist(s)	3	Tonie Campbell	United States	7.51	PB
2nd place, silver medalist(s)	7	Stéphane Caristan	France	7.62	
3rd place, bronze medalist(s)	8	Nigel Walker	Great Britain	7.66	
4	6	Colin Jackson	Great Britain	7.68	
5	2	Arto Bryggare	Finland	7.68	
6	1	Javier Moracho	Spain	7.89	
	4	Mark McKoy	Canada	DNF	
	5	Greg Foster	United States	DQ	
