= Philippe Aubert (hurdler) =

French hurdler

Personal information
- Born: 5 October 1957 (age 68) Aulnay-sous-Bois, France

Sport
- Sport: Athletics
- Event(s): 110 m hurdles, 60 m hurdles

Philippe Aubert (born 5 October 1957 in Aulnay-sous-Bois) is a retired French athlete who specialised in the sprint hurdles. He is best known for winning the gold medal in the 110 metres hurdles at the inaugural 1989 Jeux de la Francophonie in Casablanca. In addition, he represented his country at four European Indoor Championships.

His personal bests are 13.68 seconds in the 110 metres hurdles (+0.4 m/s, Tours 1988) and 7.76 seconds in the 60 metres hurdles (Liévin 1987).

== International competitions ==
Year	Competition	Venue	Position	Event	Notes
Representing France
1985	European Indoor Championships	Piraeus, Greece	19th (h)	60 m hurdles	8.01
1986	European Indoor Championships	Madrid, Spain	8th (h)	60 m hurdles	7.86
1987	European Indoor Championships	Liévin, France	11th (sf)	60 m hurdles	7.87
1989	European Indoor Championships	The Hague, Netherlands	19th (h)	60 m hurdles	7.92
1989	Jeux de la Francophonie	Casablanca, Morocco	1st	110 m hurdles	7.75
