= Antonio Gopal =

Seychellois hurdler

Personal information
- Nationality: Seychellois
- Born: 12 January 1947 (age 79)

Sport
- Sport: Track and field
- Event: 110 metres hurdles

Antonio Gopal (born 12 January 1947) is a Seychellois hurdler. He competed in the men's 110 metres hurdles at the 1980 Summer Olympics.
