= Ventsislav Radev =

Bulgarian hurdler

Ventsislav Radev (Bulgarian: Венцислав Радев; born 9 January 1961) is a Bulgarian male former track and field athlete who competed in the 110 metres hurdles. From Varna, he represented his country at the 1983 World Championships in Athletics (being a finalist there) and at the Friendship Games in 1984.

He won one national title in the 110 m hurdles, setting a championship record of 13.59 seconds to achieve this in 1983. He had greater success indoors, with three consecutive titles in the 60 metres hurdles from 1987 to 1989. His 1988 winning time of 7.73 seconds stood as a championship record for twelve years.

== International competitions ==
| Year | Competition | Venue | Position | Event | Notes |
|---|---|---|---|---|---|
| 1983 | World Championships | Helsinki, Finland | 7th | 110 m hurdles | 13.73 |
| 1984 | Friendship Games | Moscow, Soviet Union | 9th (q) | 110 m hurdles | 13.89 |

== National titles ==
- Bulgarian Athletics Championships
  - 110 m hurdles: 1983
- Bulgarian Indoor Championships
  - 60 m hurdles: 1987, 1988, 1989
