= Javier Moracho =

Spanish hurdler

Personal information
- Born: 18 August 1957 (age 68) Monzón, Spain

Sport
- Sport: Track and field
Medal record
Representing Spain
World Indoor Championships
Silver medal – second place	1985 Paris	60 m hurdles
European Indoor Championships
Gold medal – first place	1986 Madrid	60 m hurdles
Silver medal – second place	1981 Grenoble	50 m hurdles
Bronze medal – third place	1980 Sindelfingen	60 m hurdles
Mediterranean Games
Gold medal – first place	1983 Casablanca	110 m hurdles
Bronze medal – third place	1979 Split	110 m hurdles

Javier Moracho Torrente (born 18 August 1957) is a Spanish retired hurdler.

He won the European Indoor Championships in 1986 and a silver medal at the inaugural World Indoor Games in 1985. He finished seventh at the 1980 Olympics.

Moracho's personal best time was 13.42 seconds, achieved in August 1987 in Barcelona. The Spanish record currently belongs to the former Ecuadorian Jackson Quiñónez with 13.34 seconds. Furthermore, another Spanish hurdler Felipe Vivancos has run in 13.41 seconds.

== International competitions ==
Year	Competition	Venue	Position	Event	Notes
Representing Spain
1975	European Junior Championships	Athens, Greece	2nd	110 m hurdles	14.46
1977	European Indoor Championships	San Sebastián, Spain	9th (sf)	60 m hurdles	7.98
1978	European Indoor Championships	Milan, Italy	6th (sf)	60 m hurdles	7.85
1979	European Indoor Championships	Vienna, Austria	6th	60 m hurdles	7.81
1979	Universiade	Mexico City, Mexico	4th	110 m hurdles	13.84
1979	Mediterranean Games	Split, Yugoslavia	3rd	110 m hurdles	13.92
1979	Mediterranean Games	Split, Yugoslavia	5th	4 × 100 m relay	41.33
1980	European Indoor Championships	Sindelfingen, West Germany	3rd	60 m hurdles	7.75
1980	Olympic Games	Moscow, Soviet Union	7th	110 m hurdles	13.78
1981	European Indoor Championships	Grenoble, France	2nd	50 m hurdles	6.48
1982	European Indoor Championships	Milan, Italy	5th (sf)	60 m hurdles	7.77
1983	European Indoor Championships	Budapest, Hungary	11th (sf)	60 m hurdles	7.83
1983	Ibero-American Championships	Barcelona, Spain	—	110m hurdles	DQ
1983	Mediterranean Games	Casablanca, Morocco	1st	110 m hurdles	13.54 w
1983	World Championships	Helsinki, Finland	11th (sf)	110 m hurdles	13.92
1984	European Indoor Championships	Gothenburg, Sweden	4th	60 m hurdles	7.78
1984	Olympic Games	Los Angeles, United States	11th (sf)	110 m hurdles	13.89
1985	World Indoor Games	Paris, France	2nd	60 m hurdles	7.69
1985	European Indoor Championships	Piraeus, Greece	8th (sf)	60 m hurdles	7.75
1986	European Indoor Championships	Madrid, Spain	1st	60 m hurdles	7.67
1987	European Indoor Championships	Liévin, France	8th (sf)	60 m hurdles	7.72
1987	World Indoor Championships	Indianapolis, United States	6th	60 m hurdles	7.89
1988	European Indoor Championships	Budapest, Hungary	6th	60 m hurdles	7.83
1988	Ibero-American Championships	Mexico City, Mexico	3rd	110 m hurdles	13.83 A
1988	Olympic Games	Seoul, South Korea	15th (qf)	110 m hurdles	13.88
1989	European Indoor Championships	The Hague, Netherlands	16th (sf)	60 m hurdles	7.92
1989	World Indoor Championships	Budapest, Hungary	16th (h)	60 m hurdles	7.94
1989	World Cup	Barcelona, Spain	5th	110 m hurdles	13.83
1990	European Indoor Championships	Glasgow, United Kingdom	15th (h)	60 m hurdles	7.84
(#) Indicates overall position in qualifying heats (h) quarterfinals (qf) or semifinals (sf)
