= Romuald Giegiel =

Polish hurdler (born 1957)

Personal information
- Nationality: Polish
- Born: 8 May 1957 (age 69) Opoczno, Poland
- Height: 1.84 m (6 ft 0 in)
- Weight: 72 kg (159 lb)

Sport
- Sport: Track and field
- Event: 60 m hurdles
Medal record
Representing Poland
Men's athletics
European Indoor Championships
Gold medal – first place	1984 Gothenburg	60 m hurdles
Silver medal – second place	1980 Sindelfingen	60 m hurdles

Romuald Giegiel (born 8 May 1957 in Warsaw) is a retired hurdler from Poland. He won two medals at the European Indoor Championships. Since 2006, he has been a sports therapist for the Polish Athletic Association.

== International competitions ==
Year	Competition	Venue	Position	Event	Notes
Representing Poland
1975	European Junior Championships	Athens, Greece	10th (sf)	110 m hurdles	14.85
1977	Universiade	Sofia, Bulgaria	12th (h)	110 m hurdles	13.9
1978	European Indoor Championships	Milan, Italy	11th (sf)	60 m hurdles	7.96
1978	European Championships	Athens, Greece	7th	110 m hurdles	13.91
1979	European Indoor Championships	Vienna, Austria	5th	60 m hurdles	7.78
1980	European Indoor Championships	Sindelfingen, West Germany	2nd	60 m hurdles	7.73
1981	Universiade	Bucharest, Romania	5th	110 m hurdles	13.91
1982	European Championships	Athens, Greece	6th	110 m hurdles	13.82
1983	European Indoor Championships	Budapest, Hungary	6th	60 m hurdles	7.70
1983	Universiade	Edmonton, Canada	5th	110 m hurdles	13.73
1984	European Indoor Championships	Gothenburg, Sweden	1st	60 m hurdles	7.62
1984	Friendship Games	Moscow, Soviet Union	10th (h)	110 m hurdles	13.91
1985	European Indoor Championships	Piraeus, Greece	12th (sf)	60 m hurdles	7.91
1986	European Indoor Championships	Madrid, Spain	6th	60 m hurdles	7.75
1986	European Championships	Stuttgart, West Germany	23rd (h)	110 m hurdles	14.55
