= Herwig Röttl =

Austrian hurdler

Personal information
- Born: January 30, 1968 (age 58) Waiern, Austria
- Height: 1.84 m (6 ft 0 in)
- Weight: 81 kg (179 lb)

Sport
- Sport: Track and field
- Events: 110 m hurdles, 60 m hurdles
- Club: TLC Feldkirchen

Herwig Röttl (born 30 January 1968 in Waiern) is a retired Austrian athlete who specialised in the sprint hurdles. He represented her country at the 1992 and 1996 Summer Olympics, as well as two outdoor and three indoor World Championships.

His personal bests are 13.41 seconds in the 110 metres hurdles (+1.4 m/s, Bad Homburg 1992) and 7.64 seconds in the 60 metres hurdles (Feldkirchen 1996).

== Competition record ==
Year	Competition	Venue	Position	Event	Notes
Representing Austria
1986	World Junior Championships	Athens, Greece	15th (h)	400 m hurdles	52.29^{1}
1987	European Junior Championships	Birmingham, United Kingdom	4th	110 m hurdles	14.18
1988	European Indoor Championships	Budapest, Hungary	10th (sf)	60 m hurdles	7.90
1989	European Indoor Championships	The Hague, Netherlands	22nd (h)	60 m hurdles	7.94
1989	World Indoor Championships	Budapest, Hungary	12th (sf)	60 m hurdles	8.07
1990	European Championships	Split, Yugoslavia	22nd (h)	110 m hurdles	14.23
1991	World Indoor Championships	Seville, Spain	14th (sf)	60 m hurdles	7.76
1991	World Championships	Tokyo, Japan	15th (h)	110 m hurdles	13.66
1991	World Championships	Tokyo, Japan	14th (h)	4 × 100 m relay	39.85
1992	Olympic Games	Barcelona, Spain	11th (qf)	110 m hurdles	13.68^{1}
1993	World Indoor Championships	Toronto, Canada	12th (sf)	60 m hurdles	7.82
1994	European Indoor Championships	Paris, France	23rd (h)	60 m hurdles	7.88
1995	World Championships	Gothenburg, Sweden	32nd (h)	110 m hurdles	13.85
1996	European Indoor Championships	Stockholm, Sweden	2nd (h)	60 m hurdles	7.75^{1}
1996	Olympic Games	Atlanta, United States	50th (h)	110 m hurdles	14.08

^{1} Did not start in the semifinals
