= Sam Turner (athlete) =

American hurdler

Personal information
- Born: Sam Turner; June 17, 1957 (age 69)

Sam Turner (born June 17, 1957) is an American male former track and field hurdler who competed in both the 110-meter hurdles and 400-meter hurdles.

Turner was a finalist in the 110 m at the 1983 World Championships in Athletics and achieved his personal record in the event (13.17) that same year. He ranked number three in the world in sprint hurdles in 1982 and second in the world behind Greg Foster in 1983. He ran at the 1983 AAA Championships, being runner-up to Tonie Campbell. He was twice a medallist at the Pacific Conference Games, taking 400 m hurdles silver behind Garry Brown in 1977 and winning 110 m hurdles in 1981.

Turner did not win any national titles in his career, with his closest attempts being third in the 400 m hurdles at the 1978 USA Outdoor Track and Field Championships and second to Greg Foster at the 1983 USA Outdoor Track and Field Championships. His personal record of 49.04 seconds in the 400 m hurdles in 1978 ranked him fifth globally.

== Personal records ==
- 50 metres hurdles – 6.46 (1985)
- 55 metres hurdles – 7.07 1985)
- 60 metres hurdles – 7.67 (1984)
- 110 metres hurdles – 13.17 (1983)
- 400 metres hurdles – 49.04 (1978)
- 100 metres – 10.48 (1984)
- 200 metres – 20.52 (1984)
- 400 metres – 46.53 (1978)

== International competitions ==
| Year | Competition | Venue | Position | Event | Notes |
|---|---|---|---|---|---|
| 1977 | Pacific Conference Games | Canberra, Australia | 2nd | 400 m hurdles | 53.08 |
| 1981 | Pacific Conference Games | Christchurch, New Zealand | 1st | 110 m hurdles | 13.80 |
| 1983 | World Championships | Helsinki, Finland | 8th | 110 m hurdles | 13.82 |
| 1985 | IAAF Grand Prix Final | Rome, Italy | 3rd | 110 m hurdles | 13.44 |
