= Abdul Ismail (athlete) =

Mozambican hurdler

Personal information
- Nationality: Mozambican
- Born: 8 December 1948 (age 77)

Sport
- Sport: Track and field
- Event: 110 metres hurdles

Abdul Ismail (born 8 December 1948) is a Mozambican hurdler. He competed in the men's 110 metres hurdles at the 1980 Summer Olympics.
