= Antonio Smith (athlete) =

Venezuelan athlete (born 1967)

Personal information
- Full name: Antonio Emmanuel Smith
- Born: 1 March 1967 (age 58)

Sport
- Sport: Athletics
- Event: 400 metres hurdles

Antonio Emmanuel Smith (born 1 March 1967) is a retired Venezuelan athlete who specialised in the 400 metres hurdles. He represented his country at the 1991 World Championships without advancing from the first round.

His personal best in the event is 49.18 set in Caracas in 1991. This is the standing national record.

== International competitions ==
Year	Competition	Venue	Position	Event	Notes
Representing Venezuela
1986	Central American and Caribbean Junior Championships (U20)	Mexico City, Mexico	2nd	400 m hurdles	50.85
1986	World Junior Championships	Athens, Greece	17th (h)	400 m hurdles	52.42
1986	Ibero-American Championships	Havana, Cuba	5th	400 m hurdles	52.16
1987	Central American and Caribbean Championships	Caracas, Venezuela	3rd	400 m hurdles	50.94
1988	Ibero-American Championships	Mexico City, Mexico	6th	400 m hurdles	51.18
1989	Bolivarian Games	Maracaibo, Venezuela	2nd	400 m hurdles	53.10
1989	South American Championships	Medellín, Colombia	3rd	400 m hurdles	51.32
1990	Central American and Caribbean Games	Mexico City, Mexico	2nd	400 m hurdles	51.32
1990	Central American and Caribbean Games	Mexico City, Mexico	5th	4 × 400 m relay	3:12.44
1991	South American Championships	Manaus, Brazil	2nd	400 m hurdles	50.14
1991	South American Championships	Manaus, Brazil	2nd	4 × 400 m relay	3:08.39
1991	Pan American Games	Havana, Cuba	5th	400 m hurdles	50.71
1991	World Championships	Tokyo, Japan	28th (h)	400 m hurdles	50.59
1992	Ibero-American Championships	Seville, Spain	4th	400 m hurdles	50.78
1993	South American Championships	Lima, Peru	4th	400 m hurdles	51.0
1996	Ibero-American Championships	Medellín, Colombia	11th (h)	400 m hurdles	52.28
1997	Bolivarian Games	Arequipa, Peru	3rd	400 m hurdles	51.44
