= György Bakos =

Hungarian hurdler (born 1960)

Personal information
- Born: 6 July 1960 (age 65) Zalaegerszeg, Hungary

Sport
- Sport: Track and field
Medal record
Representing Hungary
European Indoor Championships
Gold medal – first place	1985 Athens	60m hurdles
Silver medal – second place	1984 Gothenburg	60m hurdles
Summer Universiade
Silver medal – second place	1985 Kobe	110m hurdles

György Bakos (born 6 July 1960) is a retired hurdler from Hungary. He won two medals at the European Indoor Championships.

== International competitions ==
Year	Competition	Venue	Position	Event	Notes
Representing Hungary
1979	European Junior Championships	Bydgoszcz, Poland	2nd	110 m hurdles	14.23
1980	European Indoor Championships	Sindelfingen, West Germany	13th (h)	60 m hurdles	7.99
1981	European Indoor Championships	Grenoble, France	9th (sf)	50 m hurdles	6.69
1981	Universiade	Bucharest, Romania	13th (sf)	110 m hurdles	14.15
1982	European Indoor Championships	Milan, Italy	9th (sf)	60 m hurdles	7.94
1982	European Championships	Athens, Greece	14th (sf)	110 m hurdles	14.06 (+0.4 m/s)
1983	European Indoor Championships	Budapest, Hungary	5th	60 m hurdles	7.64
1983	World Championships	Helsinki, Finland	6th	110 m hurdles	13.68
1984	European Indoor Championships	Gothenburg, Sweden	2nd	60 m hurdles	7.75
1984	Friendship Games	Moscow, Soviet Union	1st	110 m hurdles	13.52
1985	European Indoor Championships	Athens, Greece	1st	60 m hurdles	7.60
1985	Universiade	Kobe, Japan	2nd	110 m hurdles	13.72
1986	Goodwill Games	Moscow, Soviet Union	–	110 m hurdles	DNF
1986	European Championships	Stuttgart, West Germany	8th	110 m hurdles	13.84 (+2.0 m/s)
1987	World Indoor Championships	Indianapolis, United States	10th (h)	60 m hurdles	7.84
1988	Olympic Games	Seoul, South Korea	8th	4 × 100 m relay	39.19
1989	European Indoor Championships	The Hague, Netherlands	19th (h)	60 m hurdles	7.92
1989	World Indoor Championships	Budapest, Hungary	15th (h)	60 m hurdles	7.85
1990	European Championships	Split, Yugoslavia	21st (h)	110 m hurdles	14.12 (-1.2 m/s)
1990	European Championships	Split, Yugoslavia	5th	4 × 100 m relay	39.05
