= Leigh Miller (hurdler) =

Australian hurdler

Personal information
- Nationality: Australian
- Born: 19 August 1963 (age 62) Box Hill, New South Wales, Australia
- Height: 182 cm (6 ft 0 in)
- Weight: 74 kg (163 lb)

Sport
- Sport: Athletics
- Event: Hurdling

Achievements and titles
- Personal best: 49.85

Leigh David Miller (born August 19, 1963) is an Australian Olympic hurdler. He represented his country in the men's 400 metres hurdles at the 1988 Summer Olympics. His time was a 50.53 in the hurdles. He also competed in the Men's 4 × 400 metres relay, where his team finished with a time of 3:05.93 in the qualifiers.

Miller finished third on two occasions in the 400 metres hurdles event at the British 1990 AAA Championships and 1991 AAA Championships.
