= Joseph Maritim =

Kenyan hurdler

Joseph Maritim (born 22 October 1968) is a retired Kenyan athlete who specialized in the 400 metres hurdles.

He finished fourth at the 1987 All-Africa Games, in a career best time of 49.33 seconds.

He also competed at the 1988 Olympic Games without reaching the final.
