= Július Ivan =

Slovak hurdler (born 1954)

Personal information
- Born: 25 March 1954 (age 72) Šurany, Czechoslovakia

Sport
- Sport: Track and field
Medal record
Representing Czechoslovakia
IAAF World Cup
Bronze medal – third place	1981 Rome	110 m hurdles

Július Ivan (born 25 March 1954) is a Slovak former track and field hurdler who competed in the 110 metres hurdles for Czechoslovakia. Born in Šurany, he was a member of the Dukla Banská Bystrica sports club and represented his country at the 1980 Moscow Olympics. He was a bronze medallist at the 1981 IAAF World Cup. He also represented his country at the European Athletics Championships twice and at the 1987 World Championships in Athletics. He was the B-final winner of the 1981 European Cup.

He was a five time national champion at the Czechoslovak Athletics Championships between 1975 and 1983, and also won two indoor national titles over 60 metres hurdles (1979 and 1980). His national title-winning time of 13.55 seconds outdoors in 1981 was a lifetime best, a championship record that was unbeaten for a decade, and ranked him second among Europeans for that season.

== International competitions ==
Year	Competition	Venue	Position	Event	Notes
1978	European Championships	Prague, Czechoslovakia	7th (semis)	110 m hurdles	14.29
1980	Olympic Games	Moscow, Soviet Union	—	110 m hurdles	DNF
1981	European Cup B Final	Athens, Greece	1st	110 m hurdles	13.54w
1981	World Cup	Rome, Italy	3rd	110 m hurdles	13.66
1982	European Championships	Athens, Greece	7th (heats)	110 m hurdles	14.05
1983	World Championships	Helsinki, Finland	6th	110 m hurdles	14.28

== National titles ==
- Czechoslovak Athletics Championships
  - 110 m hurdles: 1975, 1979, 1980, 1981, 1983
- Czechoslovak Indoor Athletics Championships
  - 60 m hurdles: 1979, 1980
