= Larry Cowling =

American politician

Member of the Arkansas House of Representatives from the 2nd district
- In office 2007–2013
- Succeeded by: Lane Jean

Personal details
- Party: Democratic

Larry Cowling is an American politician. He was a member of the Arkansas House of Representatives from the 2nd district, serving from 2007 to 2013. He is a member of the Democratic Party.
