= Andreas Schlißke =

German hurdler

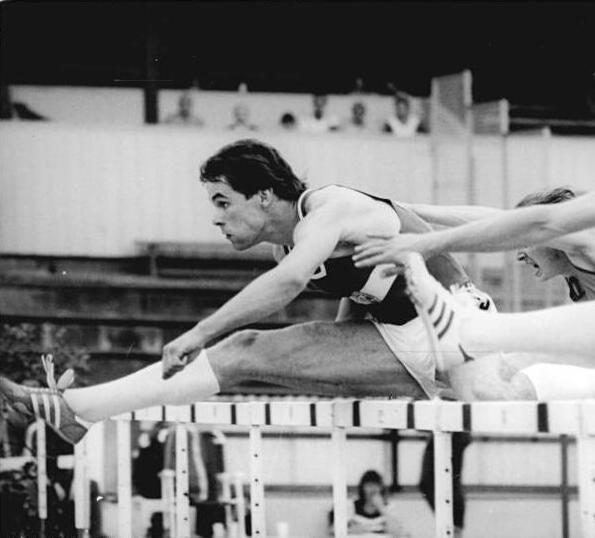
- Andreas Schlißke in 1981

Personal information
- Nationality: German
- Born: 5 June 1957 (age 69)

Sport
- Sport: Track and field
- Event: 110 metres hurdles

Andreas Schlißke (born 5 June 1957) is a German hurdler. He competed in the men's 110 metres hurdles at the 1980 Summer Olympics, representing East Germany.
