= Béla Bodó =

Hungarian hurdler (1959–2026)

Béla Bodó (19 January 1959 – 21 July 2026) was a Hungarian hurdler who specialised in the 110 metres hurdles.

Bodó was born in Vámospércs, Hungary on 19 January 1959. He qualified for the semi-final at the 1983 World Championships, but did not start. He also competed at the 1979 European Indoor Championships, the 1983 European Indoor Championships, and the 1985 European Indoor Championships without reaching the finals. He became the Hungarian indoor champion in 1979.

His personal best time was 13.68 seconds, achieved in July 1983 in Budapest.

Bodó died on 21 July 2026, at the age of 67.
