= Holger Pohland =

German hurdler (born 1963)

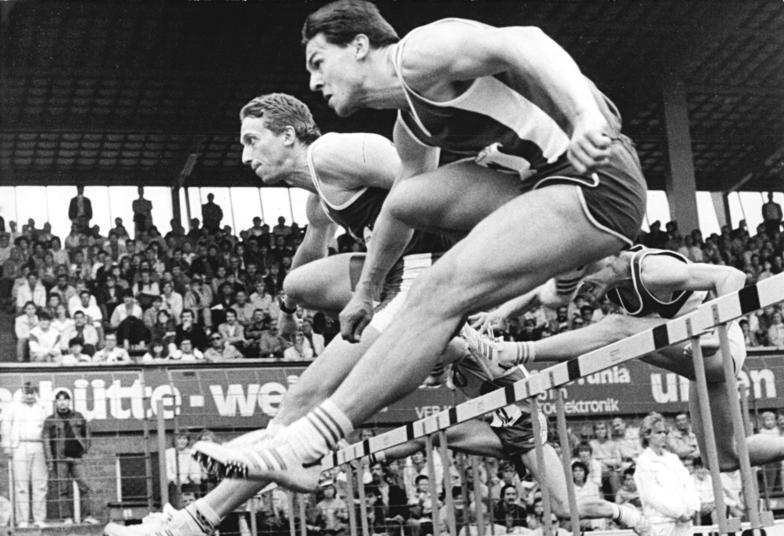
- Pohland (foreground) racing against Andreas Oschkenat in 1988

Personal information
- Born: 5 April 1963 (age 63) Falkenhain, Bezirk Leipzig, East Germany

Sport
- Sport: Athletics
- Event(s): 110 m hurdles, 60 m hurdles
- Club: SC DHfK Leipzig; SG Motor Gohlis-Nord Leipzig

Holger Pohland (born 5 April 1963) is a retired sprint hurdler who competed for East Germany for most of his career. He won medals at the 1986 and 1989 European Indoor Championships, as well as the 1981 European Junior Championships. In addition, he competed at two World Indoor Championships.

His personal bests are 13.40 seconds in the 110 metres hurdles (+2.0 m/s; Tallinn 1986) and 7.63 seconds in the 60 metres hurdles (Karlsruhe 1991).

As was revealed in the documents made public after the German reunification, Pohland was involved in the East German state-sponsored doping system.
