= Wilbert Greaves =

British hurdler

Personal information
- Nationality: Barbadian / British
- Born: 23 December 1956 (age 69) Bridgetown, Saint Michael, Barbados
- Height: 187 cm (6 ft 2 in)
- Weight: 77 kg (170 lb)

Sport
- Sport: Athletics
- Event: 110 metres hurdles
- Club: Haringey AC

Wilbert Ethelbert Greaves (born 23 December 1956) is a male Barbadian born retired hurdler who represented Great Britain and England. Greaves competed in the 110 metres hurdles at the 1980 Summer Olympics and the 1984 Summer Olympics.

== Biography ==
He represented England in the 110 metres hurdles and 400 metres hurdles events, at the 1982 Commonwealth Games in Brisbane, Australia. Four years later he represented England in the 110 metres hurdles event, at the 1986 Commonwealth Games in Edinburgh, Scotland.

Greaves was runner-up on three occasions at the AAA Championships in the 110 metres hurdles event at the 1979 AAA Championships, 1982 AAA Championships and the 1984 AAA Championships. Additionally, he was a three times winner at the UK Athletics Championships in 1980, 1982, and 1985.
