= Yuriy Chervanyov =

Soviet hurdler

Medal record

Men's athletics

Representing Soviet Union

European Indoor Championships
| Gold medal – first place | 1980 Sindelfingen | 60 m hurdles |

Yuriy Nikolayevich Chervanev (Russian: Юрий Николаевич Черванёв; born 15 January 1958) is a retired Soviet hurdler, born in Baranovichi, Byelorussian SSR.

== Achievements ==
| Year | Tournament | Venue | Result | Extra |
|---|---|---|---|---|
| 1980 | European Indoor Championships | Sindelfingen, West Germany | 1st | 60 m hurdles |
| 1980 | Olympic Games | Moscow, Soviet Union | 8th | 110 m hurdles |
| 1981 | European Indoor Championships | Grenoble, France | 5th | 50 m hurdles |
| 1982 | European Indoor Championships | Milan, Italy | DNF | 60 m hurdles |
