= Michael Radzey =

German hurdler

Personal information
- Nationality: German
- Born: August 31, 1960 (age 65)

Sport
- Sport: Hurdling

Michael Radzey (born 31 August 1960) is a retired West German hurdler.

He competed at the 1986 European Championships, the 1987 World Championships and the 1988 European Indoor Championships without reaching the final.

He also won two silver medals at the West German indoor championships. He represented the club MTG Mannheim.

His personal best times were 7.72 seconds in the 60 metres hurdles, achieved in February 1988 in Dortmund; and 13.77 seconds in the 110 metres hurdles, achieved in August 1985 in Stuttgart.
