= Urs Rohner =

Swiss lawyer and banker (born 1959)

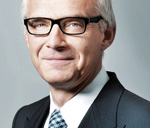
- Born: 1 December 1959 (age 66); Zürich, Switzerland
- Education: University of Zurich
- Occupation: Lawyer
- Successor: António Horta-Osório
- Board member of: Credit Suisse (2011-2021)
- Spouse: Nadja Schildknecht

Urs Rohner (born 1959) is a Swiss lawyer, businessman and banker. He is the former CEO of ProSiebenSat.1 Media and former chairman of Swiss bank Credit Suisse. During his 10 year tenure the share price lost 75% of its value.

== Early life ==
Rohner was born 1959. He competed as a hurdler in the 1982 European Athletics Championships. He earned a master of laws from the University of Zurich in 1983.

== Career ==
Rohner began his career at the law firm Lenz & Staehelin in Zurich, where he was a partner from 1992 to 1999. He subsequently practised for Sullivan & Cromwell in New York City.

Rohner served as the chief executive officer of ProSiebenSat.1 Media from 2000 to 2004.

=== Credit Suisse, 2004–2021 ===
Rohner became the chief lawyer at Credit Suisse in 2004.

After moving to the company's board of directors, Rohner served as its vice chairman from 2009 to 2011. Since 2011, he has served as its chairman. In 2017, he was criticized by investors for his poor performance. In 2020, shareholders voted to re-elect Rohner for a final term in office with 77.5% support; the 21.6% opposition he faced was the highest in his nearly a decade as chairman. He retired in May 2021 from the Board of Credit Suisse - during his 10 year tenure, the stock price has fallen by over 70%. In the last year of his tenure, Rohner appointed Lara Warner with no prior risk management experience to Chief Risk Officer of the bank in a push for diversity. Consequently, Credit Suisse's clients lost around $3bn due to the collapse of Greensill. Furthermore, with the collapse of Archegos Capital Credit Suisse lost over $5.5bn exposing its weak risk management, which Rohner in the aftermath of the financial crisis promised to reform.

For his work at Credit Suisse, Rohner received 43.5 million CHF ($47m) in pay.

== Other activities ==
=== Corporate boards ===
- Investcorp, Member of the International Advisory Board (since 2021)

=== Non-profit organizations ===
Rohner served on the board of trustees of the Lucerne Festival, and the Zürich Opera House, as well as the board of governance of the International Institute for Management Development.

== Personal life ==
Rohner is in a relationship with Nadja Schildknecht, the managing director of the Zurich Film Festival and has a son with her. He has three children from his first marriage.
