= Aleksandr Puchkov =

Soviet athletics competitor (1957–2024)

Personal information
- Born: 25 March 1957 Ulyanovsk, Soviet Union
- Died: 9 October 2024 (aged 67) Saint Petersburg, Russia

Sport
- Sport: Track and field
Medal record
Representing Soviet Union
Olympic Games
Bronze medal – third place	1980 Moscow	110 m hurdles
European Indoor Championships
Gold medal – first place	1982 Milan	60 m hurdles
Summer Universiade
Bronze medal – third place	1979 Mexico City	110 m hurdles

Aleksandr Nikolayevich Puchkov (Russian: Александр Николаевич Пучков; 25 March 1957 – 9 October 2024) was a Soviet and Russian hurdler and Olympic bronze medallist, who competed for the Soviet Union during his career. Born in Ulyanovsk on 25 March 1957, he died in Saint Petersburg on 9 October 2024, at the age of 67.

== Achievements ==
Year	Tournament	Venue	Result	Extra
1979	Summer Universiade	Mexico City, Mexico	3rd	110 m hurdles
1980	Summer Olympics	Moscow, USSR	3rd	110 m hurdles
1982	European Indoor Championships	Milan, Italy	1st	60 m hurdles
