= 1982 European Athletics Indoor Championships =

- Dates: 6–7 March 1982
- Host city: Milan; Italy
- Venue: Palasport di San Siro
- Events: 23
- Participation: 282 athletes from 23 nations

The 1982 European Athletics Indoor Championships were held at Palasport di San Siro in Milan, a city in Italy, on 6 and 7 March 1982. It was the second time the championships were held in Milan after the 1978 edition.

== Medal summary ==
=== Men ===
Event	Gold		Silver		Bronze	
60 metres	Marian Woronin (POL)	6.61	Valentin Atanasov (BUL)	6.62	Bernard Petitbois (FRA)	6.66
200 metres	Erwin Skamrahl (FRG)	21.20 CR	István Nagy (HUN)	21.41	Michele Di Pace (ITA)	21.52
400 metres	Pavel Konovalov (URS)	47.04	Sándor Újhelyi (HUN)	47.14	Benjamín González (ESP)	47.41
800 metres	Antonio Páez (ESP)	1:48.02	Klaus-Peter Nabein (FRG)	1:48.31	Colomán Trabado (ESP)	1:48.35
1500 metres	José Luis González (ESP)	3:38.70	José Manuel Abascal (ESP)	3:38.91	Antti Loikkanen (FIN)	3:39.62
3000 metres	Patriz Ilg (FRG)	7:53.50	Alberto Cova (ITA)	7:54.12	Valeriy Abramov (URS)	7:54.46
60 metres hurdles	Aleksandr Puchkov (URS)	7.73	Plamen Krastev (BUL)	7.74	Karl-Werner Dönges (FRG)	7.80
5000 metres walk	Maurizio Damilano (ITA)	19:19.93	Carlo Mattioli (ITA)	20:06.91	Martin Toporek (AUT)	20:19.47
High jump	Dietmar Mögenburg (FRG)	2.34	Janusz Trzepizur (POL)	2.32	Roland Dalhäuser (SUI)	2.32
Pole vault	Viktor Spasov (URS)	5.70 =CR	Konstantin Volkov (URS)	5.65	Władysław Kozakiewicz (POL)	5.60
Long jump	Henry Lauterbach (GDR)	7.86	Rolf Bernhard (SUI)	7.83	Giovanni Evangelisti (ITA)	7.83
Triple jump	Béla Bakosi (HUN)	17.13	Gennadiy Valyukevich (URS)	16.87	Nikolay Musiyenko (URS)	16.82
Shot put	Vladimir Milić (YUG)	20.45	Remigius Machura (TCH)	20.07	Jovan Lazarević (YUG)	19.65

=== Women ===
Event	Gold		Silver		Bronze	
60 metres	Marlies Göhr (GDR)	7.11 =CR	Sofka Popova (BUL)	7.19	Wendy Hoyte (GBR)	7.27
200 metres	Gesine Walther (GDR)	22.80 CR	Yelena Kelchevskaya (URS)	23.35	Heidi-Elke Gaugel (FRG)	23.39
400 metres	Jarmila Kratochvílová (TCH)	49.59 WR	Dagmar Rübsam (GDR)	51.18	Gaby Bußmann (FRG)	51.57
800 metres	Doina Melinte (ROM)	2:00.39 CR	Martina Steuk (GDR)	2:01.07	Jolanta Januchta (POL)	2:01.24
1500 metres	Gabriella Dorio (ITA)	4:04.01	Brigitte Kraus (FRG)	4:04.22	Beate Liebich (GDR)	4:06.70
3000 metres	Agnese Possamai (ITA)	8:53.77 CR	Maricica Puică (ROM)	8:54.26	Paula Fudge (GBR)	8:56.96
60 metres hurdles	Kerstin Knabe (GDR)	7.98	Bettine Gärtz (GDR)	8.00	Yordanka Donkova (BUL)	8.09
High jump	Ulrike Meyfarth (FRG)	1.99 CR	Andrea Bienias (GDR)	1.99	Katalin Sterk (HUN)	1.99 NR
Long jump	Sabine Everts (FRG)	6.70	Karin Hänel (FRG)	6.54	Valy Ionescu (ROM)	6.52
Shot put	Verzhinia Veselinova (BUL)	20.19	Helena Fibingerová (TCH)	19.24	Natalya Lisovskaya (URS)	18.50

== Medal table ==
Rank	Nation	Gold	Silver	Bronze	Total
1	West Germany (FRG)	5	3	3	11
2	East Germany (GDR)	4	4	1	9
3	Soviet Union (URS)	3	3	3	9
4	Italy (ITA)	3	2	2	7
5	Spain (ESP)	2	1	2	5
6	Bulgaria (BUL)	1	3	1	5
7	Hungary (HUN)	1	2	1	4
8	Czechoslovakia (TCH)	1	2	0	3
9	Poland (POL)	1	1	2	4
10	Romania (ROU)	1	1	1	3
11	Yugoslavia (YUG)	1	0	1	2
12	Switzerland (SUI)	0	1	1	2
13	Great Britain (GBR)	0	0	2	2
14	Austria (AUT)	0	0	1	1
14	Finland (FIN)	0	0	1	1
14	France (FRA)	0	0	1	1
Totals (16 entries)		23	23	23	69

== Participating nations ==
- Austria (7)
- Belgium (10)
- Bulgaria (13)
- Czechoslovakia (8)
- Denmark (1)
- East Germany (12)
- Finland (4)
- France (25)
- Great Britain (13)
- Greece (6)
- Hungary (15)
- Italy (38)
- Netherlands (5)
- Poland (10)
- Portugal (2)
- Romania (3)
- Soviet Union (31)
- Spain (16)
- Sweden (9)
- Switzerland (11)
- Turkey (1)
- West Germany (37)
- Yugoslavia (5)

== See also ==
- 1982 in athletics (track and field)
