= Plamen Krastev =

Bulgarian hurdler

Medal record

Men's athletics

Representing Bulgaria

European Indoor Championships
Silver medal – second place	1982 Milan	60 m hurdles

Plamen Krastev (Bulgarian: Пламен Кръстев; born 18 November 1958 in Mirkovo, Sofia) is a retired Bulgarian Olympic hurdler. His best personal achievement is 13.46.

== Achievements ==
Year	Tournament	Venue	Result	Event
1980	European Indoor Championships	Sindelfingen, West Germany	4th	60 m hurdles
1981	European Indoor Championships	Grenoble, France	4th	50 m hurdles
1982	European Indoor Championships	Milan, Italy	2nd	60 m hurdles
