= Andreas Oschkenat =

East German hurdler

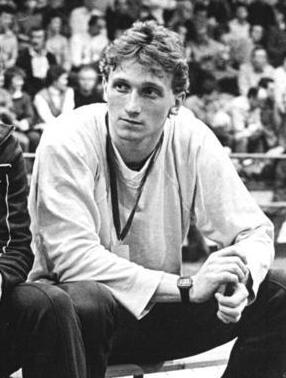
- Oschkenat in 1987

Medal record

Representing East Germany

Men's athletics

European Indoor Championships
Bronze medal – third place	1983 Budapest	60 m hurdles

Andreas Oschkenat (born 9 June 1962 in Sonneberg) is a retired East German hurdler, who won the bronze medal in 60 m hurdles at the 1983 European Indoor Championships in Athletics in Budapest. He started for the Sportvereinigung (SV) Dynamo.

His personal best time was 13.50 seconds, achieved in June 1983 in Karl-Marx-Stadt.
