= Andrey Prokofyev =

Soviet athlete (1959-1989)

Personal information
- Born: 6 June 1959 Sverdlovsk, Soviet Union
- Died: 19 June 1989 (aged 30) Yekaterinburg, Soviet Union
Medal record
Men's athletics
Representing Soviet Union
Olympic Games
Gold medal – first place	1980 Moscow	4 x 100 m relay
World Championships
Bronze medal – third place	1983 Helsinki	4 x 100 m relay
European Championships
Gold medal – first place	1982 Athens	4×100 m
Silver medal – second place	1982 Athens	110 m hurdles
Summer Universiade
Gold medal – first place	1979 Mexico City	110 m hurdles
Gold medal – first place	1983 Edmonton	110 m hurdles
Bronze medal – third place	1983 Edmonton	4 x 100 m relay

Andrey Vassilyevich Prokofyev (Russian: Андрей Васильевич Прокофьев; 6 June 1959 – 19 June 1989) was a Soviet athlete, winner of a gold medal in the 4 × 100 m relay at the 1980 Summer Olympics. After retiring, he worked as a coach.

== Biography ==
Prokofyev was born in Sverdlovsk, USSR in 1959.

At the Moscow Olympics, Prokofyev was fourth in the 110 m hurdles and won the gold medal running the anchoring leg of the Soviet 4 × 100 m relay team. At the 1982 European Championships, Prokofyev won the silver medal in the 110 m hurdles and again a gold in the 4 × 100 m relay. At the first World Championships, Prokofyev was eliminated in the heats of the 110 m hurdles, but won a bronze medal as a member of the Soviet 4 × 100 m relay team.

== Death ==
He died on 19 June 1989 in Sverdlovsk, USSR, at the age of 30. The cause of death was suicide.

== Achievements ==
Year	Competition	Venue	Position	Event	Notes
Representing Soviet Union
1980	Olympic Games	Moscow, Soviet Union	1st	4 × 100 m relay	38.26 s
1982	European Championships	Athens, Greece	1st	4 × 100 m relay	38.60 s
1982	European Championships	Athens, Greece	2nd	110 m hurdles	13.46 s
1983	World Championships	Helsinki, Finland	3rd	4 × 100 m relay	38.41 s
1986	Goodwill Games	Moscow, Soviet Union	2nd	110 m hurdles	13.28 s
