= Daniele Fontecchio =

Italian hurdler

Personal information
- Nationality: Italian
- Born: 29 December 1960 (age 65) Pescara, Italy
- Height: 1.88 m (6 ft 2 in)
- Weight: 80 kg (176 lb)

Sport
- Country: Italy
- Sport: Athletics
- Event: 110 metres hurdles
- Club: G.S. Fiamme Oro

Achievements and titles
- Personal best: 110 m hs: 13.66 (1986)
Medal record
Representing Italy
European Indoor Championships
Silver medal – second place	1986 Madrid	60 m hs
Mediterranean Games
Bronze medal – third place	1983 Casablanca	110 m hs
European Cup
Silver medal – second place	1985 Moscow	110 m hs

Daniele Fontecchio (born 29 December 1960) is a retired Italian hurdler. He is the father of National Basketball Association player Simone Fontecchio.

== Personal best ==
His personal best time was 13.66 seconds, achieved in August 1985 in Moscow.

== Achievements ==
Year	Tournament	Venue	Result	Extra
1983	Mediterranean Games	Casablanca, Morocco	3rd	110 m hurdles
1984	European Indoor Championships	Gothenburg, Sweden	5th	60 m hurdles
1985	European Indoor Championships	Piraeus, Greece	4th	60 m hurdles
1986	European Indoor Championships	Madrid, Spain	2nd	60 m hurdles

== National titles ==
He won 10 national championships at individual senior level.

- Italian Athletics Championships
  - 100 m hs: 1981, 1982, 1983, 1984, 1985, 1986
- Italian Indoor Athletics Championships
  - 60 m hs: 1982, 1983, 1984, 1985
