= Athletics at the 1976 Summer Olympics – Men's 110 metres hurdles =

Men's 110 metres hurdles at the Games of the XXI Olympiad
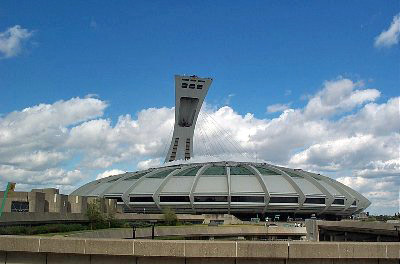
- Olympic Stadium (2003)
- Venue: Olympic Stadium
- Date: 26 July 1976 (heats); 28 July 1976 (final)
- Competitors: 24 from 17 nations
- Winning time: 13.30

Medalists
1st place, gold medalist(s)		Guy Drut; France
2nd place, silver medalist(s)		Alejandro Casañas; Cuba
3rd place, bronze medalist(s)		Willie Davenport; United States

The Men's 110 metres hurdles event at the 1976 Summer Olympics in Montreal was held on July 26, 1976, and on July 28, 1976. Twenty-four athletes from 17 nations competed. The maximum number of athletes per nation had been set at 3 since the 1930 Olympic Congress.

The event was won by Guy Drut of France, the sixth man to win two medals in the event (silver in 1972). It was France's first championship in the men's high hurdles, and only the third time the event was won by a hurdler not from the United States. Alejandro Casañas's silver gave Cuba its first medal in the event. Willie Davenport took bronze, becoming the seventh man to win a second medal and the first to do so in non-consecutive Games (he had won gold in 1968). It was the first time in Olympic history that the United States failed to win either gold or silver in the event; the Americans had won the last 9 straight editions of the event and 15 of 17 overall, with silver (and bronze) medals in the other two times (1920 and 1928).

== Background ==
This was the 18th appearance of the event, which is one of 12 athletics events to have been held at every Summer Olympics. Three finalists from 1972 returned: silver medalist Guy Drut of France, fourth-place finisher Willie Davenport of the United States (also a 1964 semifinalist and the 1968 gold medalist), and fifth-place finisher Frank Siebeck of East Germany. Drut was the 1974 European champion and the favorite, with 1975 Pan-Am champion Alejandro Casañas of Cuba his most significant challenger. Davenport was still a strong hurdler but out of his prime in his fourth Olympics; none of the other American hurdlers were dominant either.

Antigua and Barbuda and Kuwait each made their first appearance in the event. The United States made its 18th appearance, the only nation to have competed in the 110 metres hurdles in each Games to that point.

== Competition format ==
The competition continued to use the three-round format used since 1908 (except 1960, which had four rounds) and eight-man semifinals and finals, as well as the "fastest loser" system, used since 1964. The first round consisted of three heats, with 8 hurdlers each. The top five hurdlers in each heat, along with the next fastest overall, advanced to the semifinals. The 16 semifinalists were divided into two semifinals of 8 hurdlers each; the top four hurdlers in each advanced to the 8-man final.

== Records ==
These were the standing world and Olympic records (in seconds) prior to the 1976 Summer Olympics. Hand-timed records were official in 1976, but the auto-timed result of 13.24 by Milburn in the 1972 Olympic final would be recognized as the world record in 1977 when the IAAF switched to recognizing auto-timed results.

World record	Martin Lauer (FRG); Rod Milburn (USA)	13.2 (hand); 13.24 (auto)	Zürich, Switzerland; Munich, East Germany	7 July 1959; 7 September 1972
Olympic record	Rod Milburn (USA)	13.2 (hand); 13.24 (auto)	Munich, East Germany	7 September 1972

== Schedule ==
All times are Eastern Daylight Time (UTC-4)

Date	Time	Round
Monday, 26 July 1976	10:00	Round 1
Wednesday, 28 July 1976	14:30; 17:50	Semifinals; Final

== Results ==
=== Round 1 ===
The first round was held on July 26, 1976.

==== Heat 1 ====
Rank	Lane	Athlete	Nation	Time	Notes
1	6	Charles Foster	United States	13.68	Q
2	5	Berwyn Price	Great Britain	13.82	Q
3	3	Vyacheslav Kulebyakin	Soviet Union	13.99	Q
4	2	Jean-Pierre Corval	France	14.00	Q
5	4	Frank Siebeck	East Germany	14.01	Q
6	1	Gianni Ronconi	Italy	14.10	q
7	8	Abdoulaye Sarr	Senegal	14.20	
8	7	Conrad Mainwaring	Antigua and Barbuda	15.54	
				Wind: +0.0 m/s	

==== Heat 2 ====
Rank	Lane	Athlete	Nation	Time	Notes
1	2	Willie Davenport	United States	13.70	Q
2	1	Alejandro Casañas	Cuba	13.73	Q
3	3	Guy Drut	France	14.04	Q
4	5	Arnaldo Bristol	Puerto Rico	14.04	Q
5	4	Ahmed Ishtiaq Mubarak	Malaysia	14.27	Q
6	6	Stratos Vasileiou	Greece	14.33	
7	8	José Cartas	Mexico	14.56	
—	7	Max Binnington	Australia	DNF	
				Wind: +0.0 m/s	

==== Heat 3 ====
Rank	Lane	Athlete	Nation	Time	Notes
1	1	Thomas Munkelt	East Germany	13.69	Q
2	3	Viktor Myasnikov	Soviet Union	13.81	Q
3	4	Giuseppe Buttari	Italy	13.88	Q
4	5	Warren Parr	Australia	14.02	Q
5	2	James Owens	United States	14.03	Q
6	6	Danny Smith	Bahamas	14.13	
7	7	Daniel Taillon	Canada	14.23	
8	8	Saleh Faraj	Kuwait	15.97	
				Wind: +0.0 m/s	

=== Semifinals ===
The semifinals were held on July 28, 1976.

==== Semifinal 1 ====
Rank	Lane	Athlete	Nation	Time	Notes
1	3	Charles Foster	United States	13.45	Q
2	6	Thomas Munkelt	East Germany	13.48	Q
3	8	Viktor Myasnikov	Soviet Union	13.70	Q
4	7	James Owens	United States	13.76	Q
5	4	Berwyn Price	Great Britain	13.78	
6	2	Warren Parr	Australia	13.88	
7	5	Jean-Pierre Corval	France	13.97	
8	1	Gianni Ronconi	Italy	13.97	
				Wind: +0.0 m/s	

==== Semifinal 2 ====
Rank	Lane	Athlete	Nation	Time	Notes
1	2	Alejandro Casañas	Cuba	13.34	Q
2	1	Guy Drut	France	13.49	Q
3	5	Willie Davenport	United States	13.55	Q
4	6	Vyacheslav Kulebyakin	Soviet Union	13.59	Q
5	4	Frank Siebeck	East Germany	13.74	
6	7	Arnaldo Bristol	Puerto Rico	13.98	
7	3	Giuseppe Buttari	Italy	14.06	
8	8	Ahmed Ishtiaq Mubarak	Malaysia	14.21	
				Wind: +0.0 m/s	

=== Final ===
The final was held on July 28, 1976.

Rank	Lane	Athlete	Nation	Time
1st place, gold medalist(s)	5	Guy Drut	France	13.30
2nd place, silver medalist(s)	7	Alejandro Casañas	Cuba	13.33
3rd place, bronze medalist(s)	3	Willie Davenport	United States	13.38
4	6	Charles Foster	United States	13.41
5	1	Thomas Munkelt	East Germany	13.44
6	4	James Owens	United States	13.73
7	8	Vyacheslav Kulebyakin	Soviet Union	13.93
8	2	Viktor Myasnikov	Soviet Union	13.94
				Wind: +0.0 m/s

== See also ==
- 1972 Men's Olympic 110 metres hurdles (Munich)
- 1978 Men's European Championships 110 metres hurdles (Prague)
- 1980 Men's Olympic 110 metres hurdles (Moscow)
