= 1978 European Athletics Championships – Men's 110 metres hurdles =

Men's 110 metres hurdles at the European Athletics Championships

The Men's 110 metres hurdles at the 1978 European Athletics Championships was held in Prague, then Czechoslovakia, at Stadion Evžena Rošického on 1st, 2nd, and 3 September in 1978.

== Medalists ==
Gold	Thomas Munkelt; East Germany
Silver	Jan Pusty; Poland
Bronze	Arto Bryggare; Finland

== Results ==
=== Final ===
3 September Wind: -0.5 m/s

Rank	Name	Nationality	Time	Notes
1st place, gold medalist(s)	Thomas Munkelt	East Germany	13.54	
2nd place, silver medalist(s)	Jan Pusty	Poland	13.55	
3rd place, bronze medalist(s)	Arto Bryggare	Finland	13.56	
4	Giuseppe Buttari	Italy	13.78	
5	Eduard Pereverzev	Soviet Union	13.83	
6	Vyacheslav Kulebyakin	Soviet Union	13.90	
7	Romuald Giegiel	Poland	13.91	
8	Dieter Gebhard	West Germany	13.94	

=== Semi-finals ===
2 September

==== Semi-final 1 ====
Wind: -0.4 m/s

Rank	Name	Nationality	Time	Notes
1	Thomas Munkelt	East Germany	13.50	Q
2	Giuseppe Buttari	Italy	13.74	Q
3	Eduard Pereverzev	Soviet Union	13.78	Q
4	Romuald Giegiel	Poland	13.97	Q
5	Borisav Pisić	Yugoslavia	14.01	
6	Javier Moracho	Spain	14.16	
7	Petr Čech	Czechoslovakia	14.20	
8	Mark Holtom	Great Britain	14.27	

==== Semi-final 2 ====
Wind: 0 m/s

Rank	Name	Nationality	Time	Notes
1	Jan Pusty	Poland	13.75	Q
2	Arto Bryggare	Finland	13.78	Q
3	Vyacheslav Kulebyakin	Soviet Union	13.94	Q
4	Dieter Gebhard	West Germany	13.95	Q
5	Berwyn Price	Great Britain	14.01	
6	Petros Evripidou	Cyprus	14.16	
7	Július Ivan	Czechoslovakia	14.29	
	Viktor Myasnikov	Soviet Union	DNF	

=== Heats ===
1 September

==== Heat 1 ====
Wind: 0.7 m/s

Rank	Name	Nationality	Time	Notes
1	Viktor Myasnikov	Soviet Union	13.76	Q
2	Arto Bryggare	Finland	13.83	Q
3	Romuald Giegiel	Poland	13.97	Q
4	Javier Moracho	Spain	14.15	Q
5	Július Ivan	Czechoslovakia	14.22	Q
6	Petar Vukičević	Yugoslavia	14.25	

==== Heat 2 ====
Wind: -0.3 m/s

Rank	Name	Nationality	Time	Notes
1	Thomas Munkelt	East Germany	13.62	Q
2	Giuseppe Buttari	Italy	13.81	Q
3	Eduard Pereverzev	Soviet Union	13.86	Q
4	Dieter Gebhard	West Germany	14.05	Q
5	Mark Holtom	Great Britain	14.12	Q
6	Juan Lloveras	Spain	14.17	
7	Jiří Čeřovský	Czechoslovakia	14.36	

==== Heat 3 ====
Wind: 0 m/s

Rank	Name	Nationality	Time	Notes
1	Jan Pusty	Poland	13.81	Q
2	Vyacheslav Kulebyakin	Soviet Union	13.95	Q
3	Berwyn Price	Great Britain	14.00	Q
4	Borisav Pisić	Yugoslavia	14.02	Q
5	Petros Evripidou	Cyprus	14.11	Q
6	Petr Čech	Czechoslovakia	14.13	q

== Participation ==
According to an unofficial count, 19 athletes from 11 countries participated in the event.

- Cyprus (1)
- Czechoslovakia (3)
- East Germany (1)
- Finland (1)
- Italy (1)
- Poland (2)
- Soviet Union (3)
- Spain (2)
- Great Britain (2)
- West Germany (1)
- Yugoslavia (2)
