= Athletics at the 1974 British Commonwealth Games – Men's 110 metres hurdles =

Men's 110 metres hurdles at the 1974 British Commonwealth Games
- Venue: Queen Elizabeth II Park
- Dates: 25 and 26 January

Medalists
gold medal	Fatwell Kimaiyo	Kenya
silver medal	Berwyn Price	Wales
bronze medal	Max Binnington	Australia

The men's 110 metres hurdles event at the 1974 British Commonwealth Games was held on 25 and 26 January at the Queen Elizabeth II Park in Christchurch, New Zealand.

== Medallists ==
Medal winners
Gold	Silver	Bronze
Fatwell Kimaiyo; Kenya	Berwyn Price; Wales	Max Binnington; Australia

== Results ==
=== Heats ===
Held on 25 January

==== Qualification for final ====
The first 3 in each heat (Q) and the next 2 fastest (q) qualified for the final.

==== Wind speed ====
Heat 1: +1.1 m/s, Heat 2: +1.5 m/s

Heats results
Rank	Heat	Name	Nationality	Time	Notes
1	1	Berwyn Price	Wales	14.0	Q
2	1	Vin Plant	Australia	14.21	Q
3	1	Adeola Aboyade-Cole	Nigeria	14.3	Q
4	1	Charles Kirkpatrick	Northern Ireland	14.4	Q
5	1	Ross Pownall	New Zealand	14.35	
6	1	Ahmad Ishtiaq Mobarak	Malaysia	14.80	
7	1	Gus McKenzie	Scotland	14.94	
8	1	Salum Hassan	Tanzania	15.02	NR
1	2	Fatwell Kimaiyo	Kenya	13.82	Q
2	2	Max Binnington	Australia	14.16	Q
3	2	Warren Parr	Australia	14.25	Q
4	2	Godwin Obasogie	Nigeria	14.4	Q
5	2	Graham Gower	England	14.45	
6	2	Phillip Mills	New Zealand	14.51	
7	2	Justine Okaba	Uganda	14.59	
8	2	Sakaraia Tuva	Fiji	15.56	

=== Final ===
Held on 26 January

==== Wind speed ====
-0.1 m/s

Final result
Rank	Lane	Name	Nationality	Time	Notes
1st place, gold medalist(s)	5	Fatwell Kimaiyo	Kenya	13.69	GR, NR
2nd place, silver medalist(s)	3	Berwyn Price	Wales	13.84	
3rd place, bronze medalist(s)	2	Max Binnington	Australia	13.88	
4	6	Warren Parr	Australia	14.04	
5	4	Charles Kirkpatrick	Northern Ireland	14.25	
6	8	Adeola Aboyade-Cole	Nigeria	14.25	
7	1	Godwin Obasogie	Nigeria	14.39	
8	7	Vin Plant	Australia	14.89	
