= 1978 European Athletics Indoor Championships – Men's 60 metres hurdles =

The men's 60 metres hurdles event at the 1978 European Athletics Indoor Championships was held on 12 March in Milan.

== Medalists ==
Gold	Silver	Bronze
Thomas Munkelt; East Germany	Vyacheslav Kulebyakin; Soviet Union	Giuseppe Buttari; Italy

== Results ==
=== Heats ===
First 2 from each heat (Q) and the next 4 fastest (q) qualified for the semifinals.

Rank	Heat	Name	Nationality	Time	Notes
1	4	Thomas Munkelt	East Germany	7.73	Q
2	1	Vyacheslav Kulebyakin	Soviet Union	7.76	Q
3	1	Jan Pusty	Poland	7.76	Q
4	3	Giuseppe Buttari	Italy	7.83	Q
5	4	Dieter Gebhard	West Germany	7.84	Q
6	2	Andrzej Ziółkowski	Poland	7.86	Q
7	4	Berwyn Price	Great Britain	7.87	q
8	3	Arto Bryggare	Finland	7.88	Q
9	1	Borisav Pisić	Yugoslavia	7.92	q
10	3	Javier Moracho	Spain	7.93	q
10	4	Romuald Giegiel	Poland	7.93	q
12	2	Eduard Pereverzev	Soviet Union	7.94	Q
13	1	Juan Lloveras	Spain	7.99	
14	2	Petr Čech	Czechoslovakia	8.01	
15	3	Manfred Schumann	West Germany	8.03	
16	2	Sergio Liani	Italy	8.06	
17	4	Gianni Ronconi	Italy	8.07	
18	3	Thierry Sellier	France	8.08	
19	2	Plamen Krastev	Bulgaria	8.09	
20	1	Wolfgang Muders	West Germany	8.11	

=== Semifinals ===
First 3 from each heat (Q) qualified directly for the final.

Rank	Heat	Name	Nationality	Time	Notes
1	1	Thomas Munkelt	East Germany	7.70	Q
2	1	Giuseppe Buttari	Italy	7.76	Q
2	2	Arto Bryggare	Finland	7.76	Q
4	2	Jan Pusty	Poland	7.80	Q
5	2	Vyacheslav Kulebyakin	Soviet Union	7.81	Q
6	1	Berwyn Price	Great Britain	7.85	Q
6	2	Javier Moracho	Spain	7.85	
8	1	Eduard Pereverzev	Soviet Union	7.86	
8	2	Dieter Gebhard	West Germany	7.86	
10	1	Andrzej Ziółkowski	Poland	7.88	
11	2	Romuald Giegiel	Poland	7.96	
12	1	Borisav Pisić	Yugoslavia	7.99	

=== Final ===
Rank	Lane	Name	Nationality	Time	Notes
1st place, gold medalist(s)	1	Thomas Munkelt	East Germany	7.62	=CR
2nd place, silver medalist(s)	5	Vyacheslav Kulebyakin	Soviet Union	7.72	
3rd place, bronze medalist(s)	4	Giuseppe Buttari	Italy	7.86	
4	6	Berwyn Price	Great Britain	8.12	
5	2	Jan Pusty	Poland	8.15	
6	3	Arto Bryggare	Finland	9.05	
