= Athletics at the 1977 Summer Universiade – Men's 110 metres hurdles =

The men's 110 metres hurdles event at the 1977 Summer Universiade was held at the Vasil Levski National Stadium in Sofia on 20 and 21 August.

== Medalists ==
Gold	Silver	Bronze
Alejandro Casañas; Cuba	Jan Pusty; Poland	Vyacheslav Kulebyakin; Soviet Union

== Results ==
=== Heats ===
Wind:
Heat 1: ? m/s, Heat 2: -0.1 m/s, Heat 3: +1.8 m/s

Rank	Heat	Athlete	Nationality	Time	Notes
1	1	Jan Pusty	Poland	13.40	Q
2	1	Ervin Sebestyen	Romania	13.49	Q
3	1	Eduard Pereverzev	Soviet Union	13.60	q
4	1	Dieter Gebhardt	West Germany	13.69	q
5	1	Dionisio Vera	Cuba	13.7	
	1	Gianni Ronconi	Italy	DNF	
1	2	Alejandro Casañas	Cuba	13.28	Q
2	2	Vasko Nedyalkov	Bulgaria	13.94	Q
3	2	Pat Fogerty	Canada	14.02	
4	2	Július Ivan	Czechoslovakia	14.1	
5	2	Bruno Dussancourt	France	14.1	
6	2	Louis Pike	United States	14.3	
7	2	Abdul Jabbar Rahima	Iraq	14.5	
8	2	Reijo Byman	Finland	14.8	
1	3	Giuseppe Buttari	Italy	13.62	Q
2	3	Vyacheslav Kulebyakin	Soviet Union	13.64	Q
3	3	James Walker	United States	13.88	
4	3	Beat Pfister	Switzerland	13.92	
5	3	Romuald Giegiel	Poland	13.9	
6	3	Georgi Mlyakov	Bulgaria	14.0	
7	3	José Cartas	Mexico	14.0	
8	3	Thierry Sellier	France	14.11	

=== Final ===
Wind: +0.6 m/s

Rank	Athlete	Nationality	Time	Notes
1st place, gold medalist(s)	Alejandro Casañas	Cuba	13.21	WR
2nd place, silver medalist(s)	Jan Pusty	Poland	13.53	
3rd place, bronze medalist(s)	Vyacheslav Kulebyakin	Soviet Union	13.55	NR
4	Ervin Sebestyen	Romania	13.64	
5	Giuseppe Buttari	Italy	13.80	
6	Eduard Pereverzev	Soviet Union	13.86	
7	Dieter Gebhardt	West Germany	13.94	
8	Vasko Nedyalkov	Bulgaria	14.78	
