= Athletics at the 1978 Commonwealth Games – Men's 110 metres hurdles =

Men's 110 metres hurdles at the Commonwealth Games

The men's 110 metres hurdles event at the 1978 Commonwealth Games was held on 6 and 7 August at the Commonwealth Stadium in Edmonton, Alberta, Canada.

== Medalists ==
| Gold | Silver | Bronze |
|---|---|---|
| Berwyn Price; Wales | Max Binnington; Australia | Warren Parr; Australia |

== Results ==
=== Heats ===
Held on 6 August

Qualification: First 3 in each heat (Q) and the next 2 fastest (q) qualify for the final.

Wind:
Heat 1: -1.1 m/s, Heat 2: -2.3 m/s

| Rank | Heat | Name | Nationality | Time | Notes |
|---|---|---|---|---|---|
| 1 | 2 | Warren Parr | Australia | 14.02 | Q |
| 2 | 2 | Philip Sang | Kenya | 14.03 | Q |
| 3 | 2 | Berwyn Price | Wales | 14.20 | Q |
| 4 | 1 | Max Binnington | Australia | 14.28 | Q |
| 5 | 1 | Fatwell Kimaiyo | Kenya | 14.29 | Q |
| 6 | 2 | Phillip Mills | New Zealand | 14.32 | q |
| 7 | 1 | Ross Pownall | New Zealand | 14.36 | Q |
| 8 | 1 | Don Wright | Australia | 14.64 | q |
| 9 | 2 | Harold Gretzinger | Canada | 14.64 | |
| 10 | 1 | Mark Holtom | England | 14.85 | |
| 11 | 2 | Ishtiaq Mubarak | Malaysia | 14.89 | |
| 12 | 1 | Jean Jatha | Mauritius | 15.04 | |
| 13 | 2 | Lutama Ibisi | Tanzania | 15.06 | |
| 14 | 2 | Satbir Singh | India | 15.33 | |
| 15 | 1 | Brian Henschel | Canada | 15.40 | |
| 16 | 1 | Salum Hassan | Tanzania | 15.88 | |

=== Final ===
Held on 7 August

Wind: +6.2 m/s

| Rank | Name | Nationality | Time | Notes |
|---|---|---|---|---|
| 1st place, gold medalist(s) | Berwyn Price | Wales | 13.70 | |
| 2nd place, silver medalist(s) | Max Binnington | Australia | 13.73 | |
| 3rd place, bronze medalist(s) | Warren Parr | Australia | 13.73 | |
| 4 | Fatwell Kimaiyo | Kenya | 13.75 | |
| 5 | Philip Sang | Kenya | 13.97 | |
| 6 | Phillip Mills | New Zealand | 14.09 | |
| 7 | Ross Pownall | New Zealand | 14.18 | |
| 8 | Don Wright | Australia | 14.31 | |
