= Athletics at the 1975 Summer Universiade – Men's 110 metres hurdles =

The men's 110 metres hurdles event at the 1975 Summer Universiade was held at the Stadio Olimpico in Rome on 20 and 21 September.

== Medalists ==
| Gold | Silver | Bronze |
|---|---|---|
| Charles Foster; United States | Eduard Pereverzev; Soviet Union | Borisav Pisić; Yugoslavia |

== Results ==
=== Heats ===
Wind:
Heat 1: +1.0 m/s, Heat 2: +1.2 m/s

| Rank | Heat | Athlete | Nationality | Time | Notes |
|---|---|---|---|---|---|
| 1 | 2 | Eduard Pereverzev | Soviet Union | 13.97 | Q |
| 2 | 1 | Charles Foster | United States | 13.99 | Q |
| 3 | 1 | Borisav Pisić | Yugoslavia | 14.16 | Q |
| 4 | 1 | Gianni Ronconi | Italy | 14.26 | Q |
| 5 | 2 | Július Ivan | Czechoslovakia | 14.38 | Q |
| 6 | 1 | Beat Pfister | Switzerland | 14.45 | q |
| 7 | 2 | Bruno Dussancourt | France | 14.47 | Q |
| 8 | 1 | José Cartas | Mexico | 14.49 | q |
| 9 | 2 | Georgios Mandellos | Greece | 14.62 | |
| 10 | 2 | Claudio Dovichi | Italy | 14.63 | |
| 11 | 2 | Godwin Obasogie | Nigeria | 14.74 | |
| 12 | 1 | Seigha Porbeni | Nigeria | 14.88 | |
| 13 | 2 | Rodolfo Chavira | Mexico | 15.07 | |
| 14 | 1 | Saleh Mubarak Faraj | Kuwait | 15.42 | |

=== Final ===
Wind: 0.0 m/s

| Rank | Athlete | Nationality | Time | Notes |
|---|---|---|---|---|
| 1st place, gold medalist(s) | Charles Foster | United States | 13.83 | |
| 2nd place, silver medalist(s) | Eduard Pereverzev | Soviet Union | 13.94 | |
| 3rd place, bronze medalist(s) | Borisav Pisić | Yugoslavia | 14.28 | |
| 4 | Gianni Ronconi | Italy | 14.35 | |
| 5 | Beat Pfister | Switzerland | 14.48 | |
| 6 | Július Ivan | Czechoslovakia | 14.60 | |
| 7 | Bruno Dussancourt | France | 14.66 | |
| 8 | José Cartas | Mexico | 14.73 | |
