= Athletics at the 1974 Asian Games =

- Venue: Aryamehr Stadium
- Dates: 9–15 September 1974

The athletics at the 1974 Asian Games were held in Aryamehr Stadium, Tehran, Iran. This was the first time that China competed in these games and also the last time that Israel competed.

== Medalists ==
=== Men ===
Event	Gold		Silver		Bronze	
100 m	Anat Ratanapol; Thailand	10.42	Masahide Jinno; Japan	10.55	Suchart Jairsuraparp; Thailand	10.59
200 m	Anat Ratanapol; Thailand	21.09; GR	Takao Ishizawa; Japan	21.60	Nusrat Iqbal Sahi; Pakistan	21.79
400 m	Wickremasinghe Wimaladasa; Sri Lanka	46.21; GR	Reza Entezari; Iran	46.69	Yoshiharu Tomonaga; Japan	46.77
800 m	Sriram Singh; India	1:47.57; GR	Reza Entezari; Iran	1:48.50	Muhammad Siddique; Pakistan	1:48.64
1500 m	Muhammad Younis; Pakistan	3:49.30	Susumu Noro; Japan	3:51.17	Park Suk-kwan; South Korea	3:52.74
5000 m	Shivnath Singh; India	14:20.50; GR	Yuval Wischnitzer; Israel	14:21.50	Kenichi Ozawa; Japan	14:22.15
10,000 m	Yasunori Hamada; Japan	30:49.87	Shivnath Singh; India	30:51.61	Makoto Hattori; Japan	31:03.84
110 m hurdles	Cui Lin; China	14.26; GR	Ishtiaq Mubarak; Malaysia	14.49	Nasr Sultan; Iraq	14.63
400 m hurdles	Talib Faisal; Iraq	51.69; GR	Abdullatif Abbas; Kuwait	52.32	Lehmber Singh; India	52.49
3000 m steeplechase	Takaharu Koyama; Japan	8:57.95	Gurmej Singh; India	9:04.00	Li Wenliang; China	9:06.10
4 × 100 m relay	Thailand; Somsak Boontud; Suchart Jairsuraparp; Kanoksak Chaisanont; Anat Ratanapol	40.14; GR	China; Feng Zhenren; Luo Guoming; Cui Lin; Yu Weili	40.20	Singapore; C. Kunalan; Ong Yoke Phee; Tan Say Leong; Yeo Kian Chye	40.34
4 × 400 m relay	Sri Lanka; Appunidage Premachandra; Sunil Gunawardene; Kosala Sahabandu; Wickremasinghe Wimaladasa	3:07.40; GR	India; P. C. Punappa; Lehmber Singh; Sucha Singh; Sriram Singh	3:08.73	Iran; Houshang Arshadi; Fakhroddin Alamshah; Ghasem Koveitipour; Reza Entezari	3:10.10
High jump	Teymour Ghiasi; Iran	2.21; GR	Ni Zhiqin; China	2.16	Yoshikazu Okuda; Japan	2.08
Pole vault	Yasuhiro Kigawa; Japan	5.00; GR	Cai Zhangxi; China	5.00 =GR	Jiang Yubin; China	4.85
Long jump	T. C. Yohannan; India	8.07; GR	Takayoshi Kawagoe; Japan	7.77	Satish Pillai; India	7.58
Triple jump	Toshiaki Inoue; Japan	16.45; GR	Mohinder Singh Gill; India	16.25	Faramarz Asef; Iran	15.97
Shot put	Jalal Keshmiri; Iran	18.04; GR	Bahadur Singh Chauhan; India	17.94	Jugraj Singh; India	17.64
Discus throw	Jalal Keshmiri; Iran	56.82; GR	Praveen Kumar Sobti; India	53.64	Salman Hesam; Iran	52.32
Hammer throw	Shigenobu Murofushi; Japan	66.54	Nirmal Singh Grewal; India	60.02	Kim Myong-geun; North Korea	59.80
Javelin throw	Toshihiro Yamada; Japan	76.12; GR	Minoru Onda; Japan	76.04	Zhang Bao; China	73.64
Decathlon	Vijay Singh Chauhan; India	7375; GR	Junichi Onizuka; Japan	7294	Suresh Babu; India	6836

=== Women ===
Event	Gold		Silver		Bronze	
100 m	Esther Roth; Israel	11.90	He Zufen; China	12.10	Keiko Yamada; Japan	12.42
200 m	Esther Roth; Israel	23.79	He Zufen; China	24.41	Emiko Konishi; Japan	24.94
400 m	Chee Swee Lee; Singapore	55.08; GR	Nobuko Kawano; Japan	55.59	Junaidah Aman; Malaysia	55.78
800 m	Nobuko Kawano; Japan	2:08.05	Mikayo Inoue; Japan	2:08.99	Li Dan; China	2:09.89
1500 m	Song Meihua; China	4:28.68	Yang Yanying; China	4:29.17	Hana Shezifi; Israel	4:31.00
100 m hurdles	Esther Roth; Israel	13.31; GR	Tomomi Hayashida; Japan	14.28	Miyuki Iioka; Japan	14.32
4 × 100 m relay	Japan; Sayo Yamato; Tomomi Hayashida; Emiko Konishi; Keiko Yamada	46.62; GR	China; Meng Yuqiong; Kang Yueli; Xiao Zinong; He Zufen	46.76	Singapore; Eng Chiew Quay; Chee Swee Lee; Glory Barnabas; Maimoon Azlan	47.10
4 × 400 m relay	Japan; Yuko Kitabayashi; Mutsuko Otsuka; Mikayo Inoue; Nobuko Kawano	3:43.52; GR	Singapore; Glory Barnabas; Lee Tai Jong; Maimoon Azlan; Chee Swee Lee	3:43.85	Burma; Than Than; Mar Mar Min; Nwe Nwe Yee; Than Than Htay	3:45.06
High jump	Orit Abramovitz; Israel	1.78; GR	Mikiko Sone; Japan	1.78 =GR	Wu Fushan; China	1.74
Long jump	Xiao Jieping; China	6.31; GR	Kang Yueli; China	6.26	Hiroko Yamashita; Japan	6.15
Shot put	Paik Ok-ja; South Korea	16.28; GR	Gao Yukui; China	15.22	Kayoko Hayashi; Japan	15.06
Discus throw	Gao Yukui; China	51.84; GR	Dashzevegiin Namjilmaa; Mongolia	47.32	Matsuko Takahashi; Japan	47.04
Javelin throw	Zhou Maojia; China	53.06; GR	Mieko Takasaka; Japan	52.02	Keiko Myogai; Japan	47.96
Pentathlon	Kyoko Shimizu; Japan	3890	Sun Yuxiang; China	3849	Zhang Yumei; China	3783

== Medal table ==
Rank	Nation	Gold	Silver	Bronze	Total
1	Japan (JPN)	10	11	11	32
2	China (CHN)	5	10	6	21
3	India (IND)	4	7	4	15
4	Israel (ISR)	4	1	1	6
5	Iran (IRN)	3	2	3	8
6	Thailand (THA)	3	0	1	4
7	Sri Lanka (SRI)	2	0	0	2
8	Singapore (SIN)	1	1	2	4
9	Pakistan (PAK)	1	0	2	3
10	Iraq (IRQ)	1	0	1	2
10	South Korea (KOR)	1	0	1	2
12	Malaysia (MAL)	0	1	1	2
13	Kuwait (KUW)	0	1	0	1
13	Mongolia (MGL)	0	1	0	1
15	Burma (BIR)	0	0	1	1
15	North Korea (PRK)	0	0	1	1
Totals (16 entries)		35	35	35	105
