= 1979 European Athletics Indoor Championships – Men's 60 metres hurdles =

The men's 60 metres hurdles event at the 1979 European Athletics Indoor Championships was held on 24 and 25 February in Vienna.

== Medalists ==
Gold	Silver	Bronze
Thomas Munkelt; East Germany	Arto Bryggare; Finland	Eduard Pereverzev; Soviet Union

== Results ==
=== Heats ===
First 3 from each heat (Q) and the next 3 fastest (q) qualified for the semifinals.

Rank	Heat	Name	Nationality	Time	Notes
1	1	Andrey Prokofyev	Soviet Union	7.72	Q
2	2	Eduard Pereverzev	Soviet Union	7.75	Q, SB
3	2	Thomas Munkelt	East Germany	7.77	Q
4	1	Arto Bryggare	Finland	7.82	Q
4	3	Vyacheslav Kulebyakin	Soviet Union	7.82	Q
6	2	Javier Moracho	Spain	7.83	Q
7	2	Jan Pusty	Poland	7.91	q
8	3	Borisav Pisić	Yugoslavia	7.92	Q, =PB
9	1	Romuald Giegiel	Poland	7.93	Q
10	3	Plamen Krastev	Bulgaria	7.94	Q
11	2	Winfried Kessel	West Germany	8.01	q, PB
11	3	Reijo Byman	Finland	8.01	q, SB
13	1	Béla Bodó	Hungary	8.15	SB
14	3	Herbert Kreiner	Austria	8.33	SB

=== Semifinals ===
First 3 from each heat (Q) qualified directly for the final.

Rank	Heat	Name	Nationality	Time	Notes
1	2	Thomas Munkelt	East Germany	7.68	Q
2	1	Arto Bryggare	Finland	7.74	Q
3	2	Javier Moracho	Spain	7.79	Q, SB
4	2	Eduard Pereverzev	Soviet Union	7.80	Q
5	1	Romuald Giegiel	Poland	7.82	Q
6	1	Vyacheslav Kulebyakin	Soviet Union	7.84	Q
7	2	Plamen Krastev	Bulgaria	7.85	SB
8	2	Jan Pusty	Poland	7.88	SB
9	1	Andrey Prokofyev	Soviet Union	7.92	
10	1	Borisav Pisić	Yugoslavia	7.94	
11	1	Winfried Kessel	West Germany	8.03	
12	2	Reijo Byman	Finland	8.04	

=== Final ===
Rank	Name	Nationality	Time	Notes
1st place, gold medalist(s)	Thomas Munkelt	East Germany	7.59	CR
2nd place, silver medalist(s)	Arto Bryggare	Finland	7.67	SB
3rd place, bronze medalist(s)	Eduard Pereverzev	Soviet Union	7.70	PB
4	Vyacheslav Kulebyakin	Soviet Union	7.77	SB
5	Romuald Giegiel	Poland	7.78	SB
6	Javier Moracho	Spain	7.81	
