= Athletics at the 1982 Commonwealth Games – Men's 110 metres hurdles =

Men's 110 metres hurdles at the Commonwealth Games

The men's 110 metres hurdles event at the 1982 Commonwealth Games was held on 3 and 4 October at the QE II Stadium in Brisbane, Australia.

== Medalists ==
Gold	Silver	Bronze
Mark McKoy; Canada	Mark Holtom; England	Don Wright; Australia

== Results ==
=== Heats ===
Qualification: First 4 in each heat (Q) and the next 1 fastest (q) qualify for the final.

Wind:
Heat 1: +2.2 m/s, Heat 2: +2.4 m/s

Rank	Heat	Name	Nationality	Time	Notes
1	2	Don Wright	Australia	13.63	Q
2	2	Mark Holtom	England	13.83	Q
3	1	Wilbert Greaves	England	13.85	Q
4	1	Mark McKoy	Canada	13.87	Q
5	2	Karl Smith	Jamaica	13.97	Q
6	1	Berwyn Price	Wales	13.99	Q
7	1	Max Binnington	Australia	14.05	Q
8	2	Philip Sang	Kenya	14.08	Q
9	2	Warren Parr	Australia	14.38	q
9	2	Eric Spence	Canada	14.48	
10	1	William Fong	Western Samoa	14.76	
11	1	William Pakoa	Vanuatu	16.24	
	1	Glenn MacDonald	Scotland	DNF	
	1	Tim Soper	New Zealand	DNF	
	2	Carson Porteous	Northern Ireland	DNS	

=== Final ===
Wind: +1.9 m/s

Rank	Lane	Name	Nationality	Time	Notes
1st place, gold medalist(s)	8	Mark McKoy	Canada	13.37	GR
2nd place, silver medalist(s)	4	Mark Holtom	England	13.43	PB
3rd place, bronze medalist(s)	6	Don Wright	Australia	13.58	PB
4	3	Wilbert Greaves	England	13.66	
5	5	Max Binnington	Australia	13.72	
6	2	Berwyn Price	Wales	13.73	
7	1	Philip Sang	Kenya	14.08	
8	9	Karl Smith	Jamaica	14.11	
9	7	Warren Parr	Australia	14.15	
