= 1977 European Athletics Indoor Championships – Men's 60 metres hurdles =

The men's 60 metres hurdles event at the 1977 European Athletics Indoor Championships was held on 13 March in San Sebastián.

== Medalists ==
Gold	Silver	Bronze
Thomas Munkelt; East Germany	Viktor Myasnikov; Soviet Union	Arto Bryggare; Finland

== Results ==
=== Heats ===
First 3 from each heat (Q) and the next 3 fastest (q) qualified for the semifinals.

Rank	Heat	Name	Nationality	Time	Notes
1	3	Thomas Munkelt	East Germany	7.82	Q
2	1	Arto Bryggare	Finland	7.88	Q
3	3	Jan Pusty	Poland	7.92	Q
4	2	Gianni Ronconi	Italy	7.94	Q
5	2	Manfred Schumann	West Germany	7.95	Q
6	1	Emile Raybois	France	7.97	Q
6	3	Jiří Čeřovský	Czechoslovakia	7.97	Q
8	3	Roberto Schneider	Switzerland	7.98	q
9	1	Viktor Myasnikov	Soviet Union	7.99	Q
10	2	Javier Moracho	Spain	8.01	Q
11	3	Jorge Zapata	Spain	8.05	q
12	2	Andrey Korostylyov	Soviet Union	8.07	q
13	1	Juan Lloveras	Spain	8.08	
14	2	Georgi Mlyakov	Bulgaria	8.11	
15	1	Dieter Gebhard	West Germany	8.13	

=== Semifinals ===
First 2 from each heat (Q) and the next 2 fastest (q) qualified for the final.

Rank	Heat	Name	Nationality	Time	Notes
1	1	Thomas Munkelt	East Germany	7.70	Q
2	1	Viktor Myasnikov	Soviet Union	7.82	Q
3	1	Emile Raybois	France	7.89	Q
4	2	Arto Bryggare	Finland	7.90	Q
5	1	Manfred Schumann	West Germany	7.91	q
6	2	Jan Pusty	Poland	7.93	q
7	1	Jorge Zapata	Spain	7.96	
8	1	Gianni Ronconi	Italy	7.97	
9	2	Javier Moracho	Spain	7.98	
10	2	Andrey Korostylyov	Soviet Union	7.99	
11	2	Jiří Čeřovský	Czechoslovakia	8.00	
12	2	Roberto Schneider	Switzerland	8.12	

=== Final ===
Rank	Name	Nationality	Time	Notes
1st place, gold medalist(s)	Thomas Munkelt	East Germany	7.62	CR
2nd place, silver medalist(s)	Viktor Myasnikov	Soviet Union	7.79	
3rd place, bronze medalist(s)	Arto Bryggare	Finland	7.79	
4	Emile Raybois	France	7.87	
5	Manfred Schumann	West Germany	7.91	
6	Jan Pusty	Poland	7.91	
