= Athletics at the 1972 Summer Olympics – Men's shot put =

Men's shot put at the Games of the XX Olympiad
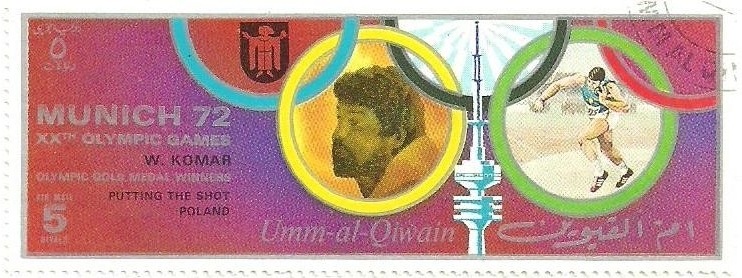
- Umm al-Quwain stamp commemorating Władysław Komar's victory
- Venue: Olympic Stadium
- Dates: September 8 & 9, 1972
- Competitors: 29 from 19 nations
- Winning distance: 21.18 OR

Medalists
1st place, gold medalist(s)		Władysław Komar; Poland
2nd place, silver medalist(s)		George Woods; United States
3rd place, bronze medalist(s)		Hartmut Briesenick; East Germany

The men's shot put field event at the 1972 Olympic Games took place on September 8 & 9. Twenty-nine athletes from 19 nations competed. The maximum number of athletes per nation had been set at 3 since the 1930 Olympic Congress.

The East German throwers were expected to pose a big challenge in these games, as well as the throwers from Poland. Brian Oldfield from the United States was the first person to use a new technique, a technique that is similar to the discus throwing style. The thrower uses a rotational spin before releasing the shot put.

The event was won by Władysław Komar of Poland, the nation's first medal in the men's shot put. It was the first time since World War II that an American had not won; George Woods had the best result for the United States with silver. It was Woods' second consecutive silver, making him the eighth man to win two medals in the event. Hartmut Briesenick took bronze, East Germany's first medal in the shot put and the first medal for any German since Hans Woellke's 1936 win (the last time a non-American had won).

The winning margin was 1 cm. As of 2023, this is the narrowest winning margin for the men's shot put at the Olympics.

== Background ==
This was the 17th appearance of the event, which is one of 12 athletics events to have been held at every Summer Olympics. Returning finalists from the 1968 Games were silver medalist George Woods of the United States, sixth-place finisher (and 1964 finalist) Władysław Komar of Poland, eighth-place finisher Heinfried Birlenbach and twelfth-place finisher Traugott Glöckler of West Germany, and eleventh-place finisher (and 1964 finalist) Les Mills of New Zealand. The American team was favored, but not as dominant as in prior years. East Germany had a strong team, with three-time Olympian Komar also a contender.

India, Nigeria, and Saudi Arabia each made their debut in the men's shot put. The United States appeared for the 17th time, the only nation to have competed in all Olympic shot put competitions to date.

== Competition format ==
The competition used the two-round format introduced in 1936, with the qualifying round completely separate from the divided final. In qualifying, each athlete received three attempts; those recording a mark of at least 19.00 metres advanced to the final. If fewer than 12 athletes achieved that distance, the top 12 would advance. The results of the qualifying round were then ignored. Finalists received three throws each, with the top eight competitors receiving an additional three attempts. The best distance among those six throws counted.

== Records ==
These were the standing world and Olympic records (in metres) prior to the 1972 Summer Olympics.

World record	Randy Matson (USA)	21.78	College Station, United States	23 April 1967
Olympic record	Randy Matson (USA)	20.68	Mexico City, Mexico	14 October 1968

The Olympic record fell quickly, with Hartmut Briesenick's first throw in the final reaching 20.97 metres. Briesenick had been the sixth thrower in the order; the seventh (Brian Oldfield) and tenth (Al Feuerbach) came in between the old record and Briesenick's new one. The thirteenth, Hans-Peter Gies, threw 21.14 metres for a new record. The fourteenth thrower, however, was Władysław Komar—who threw 21.18 metres to set a new record that would last through the competition. George Woods became the sixth man to beat the old record in the third round, and came within a centimetre of Komar's new record in the fourth. In all, 20 throws from six men were better than the old record.

== Schedule ==
All times are Central European Time (UTC+1)

Date	Time	Round
Friday, 8 September 1972	10:00	Qualifying
Saturday, 9 September 1972	14:30	Final

== Results ==
All throwers reaching 19.00 m (62 ft 4 in) and the top 12 including ties advanced to the finals. Shown in blue. All distances are listed in metres.

=== Qualifying ===
Rank	Athlete	Nation	Group	1	2	3	Distance	Notes
1	Władysław Komar	Poland	A	20.60	—	—	20.60	Q
2	Hartmut Briesenick	East Germany	B	20.38	—	—	20.38	Q
3	Heinfried Birlenbach	West Germany	B	20.10	—	—	20.10	Q
4	George Woods	United States	A	19.96	—	—	19.96	Q
5	Brian Oldfield	United States	B	19.95	—	—	19.95	Q
6	Al Feuerbach	United States	A	19.94	—	—	19.94	Q
6	Vilmos Varjú	Hungary	B	19.94	—	—	19.94	Q
8	Yves Brouzet	France	A	19.87	—	—	19.87	Q
9	Jaroslav Brabec	Czechoslovakia	A	19.82	—	—	19.82	Q
10	Jaromír Vlk	Czechoslovakia	B	X	18.20	19.61	19.61	Q
11	Seppo Simola	Finland	A	19.49	—	—	19.49	Q
12	Lahcen Samsam Akka	Morocco	B	18.98	19.36	—	19.36	Q
13	Rimantas Plungė	Soviet Union	B	18.97	19.18	—	19.18	Q
14	Bruce Pirnie	Canada	B	19.18	—	—	19.18	Q
15	Ralf Reichenbach	West Germany	A	19.14	—	—	19.14	Q
16	Traugott Glöckler	West Germany	B	18.15	19.11	—	19.11	Q
17	Hans-Peter Gies	East Germany	A	19.06	—	—	19.06	Q
18	Heinz-Joachim Rothenburg	East Germany	A	19.03	—	—	19.03	Q
19	Ivan Ivančić	Yugoslavia	B	18.80	18.95	X	18.95	
20	Geoff Capes	Great Britain	B	18.94	18.72	18.79	18.94	
21	Arnjolt Beer	France	B	18.55	18.74	18.21	18.74	
22	Aleksandr Baryshnikov	Soviet Union	A	18.45	18.41	18.65	18.65	
23	Les Mills	New Zealand	B	17.61	18.38	X	18.38	
24	Bo Grahn	Finland	B	X	X	18.20	18.20	
25	Loukas Louka	Greece	A	17.47	17.48	X	17.48	
26	Jugraj Singh	India	A	X	17.15	16.69	17.15	
27	Phil Conway	Ireland	B	16.16	15.76	16.69	16.69	
28	Christopher Okonkwo	Nigeria	A	14.98	X	16.51	16.51	
29	Hussein Al-Taib Maki	Saudi Arabia	A	X	11.57	10.77	11.57	
—	Youssef Nagui Assaad	Egypt	A	DNS				
—	Bjorn Andersen	Norway	A	DNS				
—	Bill Tancred	Great Britain	A	DNS				
—	Aristides Lanier	Cuba	B	DNS				
—	Salvatore Morale	Italy	B	DNS				
—	Vassil Kroumov	Bulgaria	B	DNS				

=== Final ===
Rank	Athlete	Nation	1	2	3	4	5	6	Distance	Notes
1st place, gold medalist(s)	Władysław Komar	Poland	21.18 OR	X	20.55	20.74	20.80	X	21.18	OR
2nd place, silver medalist(s)	George Woods	United States	20.55	20.17	20.71	21.17	20.88	21.05	21.17	
3rd place, bronze medalist(s)	Hartmut Briesenick	East Germany	20.97 OR	20.91	21.02	21.14	20.61	20.54	21.14	
4	Hans-Peter Gies	East Germany	21.14 OR	21.00	21.01	20.62	X	X	21.14	
5	Al Feuerbach	United States	20.90	20.29	X	20.86	21.01	20.28	21.01	
6	Brian Oldfield	United States	20.85	20.60	20.87	20.54	20.91	20.13	20.91	
7	Heinfried Birlenbach	West Germany	20.37	X	X	19.89	X	20.13	20.37	
8	Vilmos Varjú	Hungary	20.10	X	X	X	19.67	19.65	20.10	
9	Jaromír Vlk	Czechoslovakia	19.66	20.09	X	Did not advance			20.09	
10	Jaroslav Brabec	Czechoslovakia	19.61	19.86	19.60	Did not advance			19.86	
11	Heinz-Joachim Rothenburg	East Germany	19.74	X	X	Did not advance			19.74	
12	Yves Brouzet	France	19.42	19.61	19.49	Did not advance			19.61	
13	Ralf Reichenbach	West Germany	19.48	X	X	Did not advance			19.48	
14	Rimantas Plungė	Soviet Union	19.30	X	X	Did not advance			19.30	
15	Lahcen Samsam Akka	Morocco	19.11	X	X	Did not advance			19.11	
16	Seppo Simola	Finland	18.91	19.06	X	Did not advance			19.06	
17	Bruce Pirnie	Canada	18.90	X	X	Did not advance			18.90	
18	Traugott Glöckler	West Germany	18.85	18.47	X	Did not advance			18.85	
