= Arto Bryggare =

Finnish former hurdling athlete

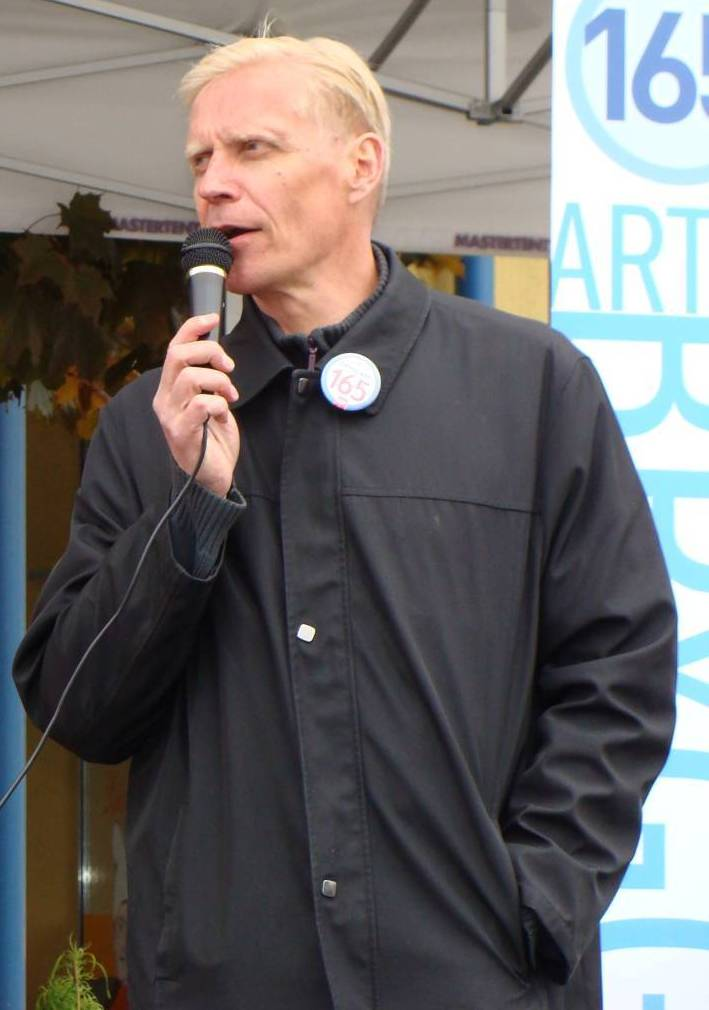
- Arto Bryggare in 2009

Personal information
- Born: 26 May 1958 (age 68) Kouvola, Finland

Sport
- Sport: Track and field
Medal record
Representing Finland
Olympic Games
Bronze medal – third place	1984 Los Angeles	110 m hurdles
World Championships
Silver medal – second place	1983 Helsinki	110 m hurdles
European Championships
Silver medal – second place	1986 Stuttgart	110 m hurdles
Bronze medal – third place	1978 Prague	110 m hurdles
Bronze medal – third place	1982 Athens	110 m hurdles
European Indoor Championships
Gold medal – first place	1981 Grenoble	50 m hurdles
Gold medal – first place	1987 Liévin	60 m hurdles
Silver medal – second place	1979 Vienna	60 m hurdles
Silver medal – second place	1983 Budapest	60 m hurdles
Bronze medal – third place	1977 San Sebastián	60 m hurdles

Arto Kalervo Bryggare (born 26 May 1958) is a Finnish former hurdling athlete. He was a member of the Parliament of Finland, representing the Social Democratic Party of Finland from 1995 to 1999 and 2003 to 2007. His personal best time 13.35, made during trials in 1984 Los Angeles Games, is still the record time in Finland and in Nordic countries. Bryggare made Finnish history by becoming the first Finn to medal in a sprint event shorter than 400 metres.

== Biography ==
Bryggare, who was born in Kouvola, was the finest ever Finnish high hurdler, winning medals in almost every major championship he competed. In 1977, at only 18 years of age, he took the bronze over 60 m hurdles at the European Indoor Championships and later that year he became European Junior champion at 110 m hurdles. After such start that rocketed him to the European hurdling elite, he continued to improve and next year he was for the first time amongst the top ten high-hurdlers in the World with a time of 13.56 secs, which earned him bronze medal at the European Championships held in Prague. Bryggare began 1979 strongly, finishing second at European Indoors beaten only by the best European high-hurdler in 70's, Thomas Munkelt from East Germany. At the 1980 Olympic Games held in Moscow, Bryggare easily advanced in the final of 110 m h, but was unable to produce fast time and finished far from medals at 6th place. He continued improving and started 1981 with winning his first European Indoor title when he was winner over 50 m hurdles at championships held in Grenoble. Next year he showed some consistency when competing at his second European Championships at Athens where he again finished at bronze medal position and again behind Munkelt, cementing his position in high-hurdling elite.

=== World silver in 1983, Olympic bronze in 1984 ===
After becoming a real medal threat at the European level, Bryggare decided to get better and pick some major medals. He couldn't have better chance for that feat because inaugural World Championships were held on his home soil, at Helsinki in 1983. Bryggare was in fine form at championships setting new personal best prior to the final and in the final he finished close second, beaten only by great Greg Foster from USA. At the 1983 World lists, Bryggare was at fourth place with 13.44s reached at semi-finals at Helsinki. Encouraged with that, he travelled to 1984 Olympic Games in Los Angeles as possible medal chance at 110 m h. However the U.S. team consisted of three great high-hurdlers and Bryggare had to be at his best to win an Olympic medal. He started bravely setting new personal best in a time of 13.35s in the heats and easily advanced to the final. In the final, he didn't produce another PB, but finished at 3rd place, grabbing the bronze medal behind Kingdom and Foster, in another great time of 13.40secs. After he reached the only medal he missed, Bryggare continued to compete for several more years and picked up more medals. His third successive medal at the Europeans came in 1986, in Stuttgart, where he finished at second place taking the silver and at the European Indoor Championships held in 1987 in Lieven, he was the winner over 60 m hurdles beating rising star, Colin Jackson from Great Britain. Later that year he tried to repeat his medal performance at the World Championships in Rome where he qualified for the final, but was unable to start the race while he injured himself in his semi-final. Following that, Bryggare competed for several more seasons without success he enjoyed in previous years.

Bryggare attended the University of Southern California in Los Angeles, which features a distinguished track program. He started his international career as a 20-year-old newcomer in the 1978 European Championships in Prague, barely winning bronze by just 2/100 seconds. This started a chain of victories still unique for a Finnish hurdler; for eight years Bryggare won a medal in every international race in which he participated. He ended his hurdling career in the 1992 Summer Olympics in Barcelona, where he considered having been as a "tourist".

== International competitions ==
Year	Competition	Venue	Position	Event	Notes
Representing Finland
1975	European Junior Championships	Athens, Greece	7th	110 m hurdles	14.86
1976	European Indoor Championships	Munich, West Germany	10th (sf)	60 m hurdles	8.09
1977	European Indoor Championships	San Sebastián, Spain	13th (h)	60 m	6.90
1977	European Indoor Championships	San Sebastián, Spain	3rd	60 m hurdles	7.79
1977	European Junior Championships	Donetsk, Soviet Union	1st	110 m hurdles	13.84
1978	European Indoor Championships	Milan, Italy	6th	60 m hurdles	9.05
1978	European Championships	Prague, Czechoslovakia	3rd	110 m hurdles	13.56
1979	European Indoor Championships	Vienna, Austria	2nd	60 m hurdles	7.67
1980	Olympic Games	Moscow, Soviet Union	6th	110 m hurdles	13.76
1981	European Indoor Championships	Grenoble, France	1st	50 m hurdles	6.47
1981	Universiade	Bucharest, Romania	6th	110 m hurdles	13.94
1982	European Indoor Championships	Milan, Italy	8th (sf)	60 m hurdles	7.89
1982	European Championships	Athens, Greece	3rd	110 m hurdles	13.60
1983	European Indoor Championships	Budapest, Hungary	2nd	60 m hurdles	7.60
1983	World Championships	Helsinki, Finland	2nd	110 m hurdles	13.46
1984	Olympic Games	Los Angeles, United States	3rd	110 m hurdles	13.40
1986	European Championships	Stuttgart, West Germany	2nd	110 m hurdles	13.42
1987	European Indoor Championships	Liévin, France	1st	60 m hurdles	7.59
1987	World Indoor Championships	Indianapolis, United States	5th	60 m hurdles	7.68
1987	World Championships	Rome, Italy	8th (sf)	110 m hurdles	13.62^{1}
1992	Olympic Games	Barcelona, Spain	26th (h)	110 m hurdles	13.92

^{1}Did not start in the final
