= Gao Yukui =

Chinese athlete

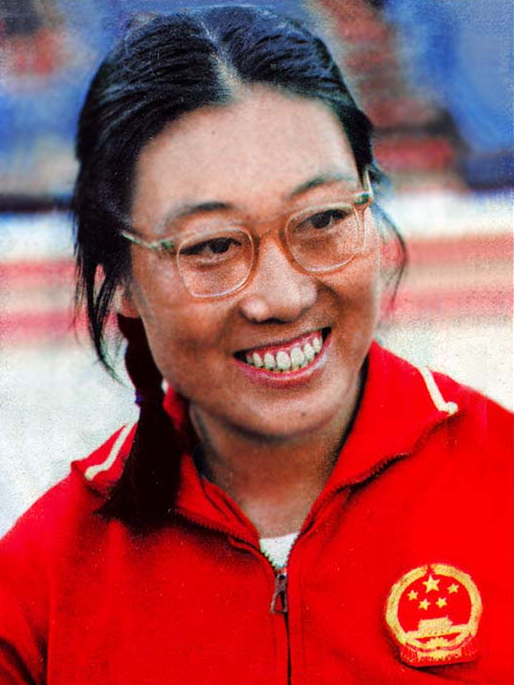
- Gao Yukui at the 1974 Asian Games

Sport
- Sport: Athletics
- Event(s): Shot put, discus throw
Medal record
Representing China
Asian Games
Gold medal – first place	1974 Tehran	Discus throw
Silver medal – second place	1974 Tehran	Shot put

Gao Yukui (Chinese: 高育葵) is a retired Chinese athlete. She won a gold medal in the discus throw and a silver in the shot put at the 1974 Asian Games.
