= Phil Conway =

Irish athlete

Personal information
- Full name: Philip Morgan Conway
- Nationality: Irish
- Born: 24 January 1948 (age 78) Dublin
- Height: 6'4

Sport
- Sport: Athletics
- Events: Shot put, Discus, Hammer
- College team: Boston University
- Club: Crusaders Athletics Club (Ireland)

Phil Conway (born 24 January 1948) is an Irish athlete. He competed in the men's shot put at the 1972 Summer Olympics.

For many years Conway was PE teacher, athletics coach and head of sport at Belvedere College, Dublin.

In his career Conway won five Irish national titles in the discus, four in the Shot Put and one in the Hammer.
