= Mark Holtom =

English athlete (born 1958)

Personal information
- Born: 6 February 1958 (age 68) Blurton, Staffordshire, England
- Height: 1.88 m (6 ft 2 in)
- Weight: 84 kg (185 lb)

Sport
- Sport: Athletics
- Events: 110 m hurdles, 60 m hurdles, 400 m hurdles
- Club: Stoke AC
- Coached by: Graham Knight (1985)

John Mark Holtom (born 6 February 1958) is a male retired athlete who specialised in the sprint hurdles who competed for Great Britain at the 1980 Summer Olympics and 1984 Summer Olympics.

== Biography ==
Holtom finished second behind Berwyn Price in the 110 metres hurdles event at both the 1977 AAA Championships and the 1978 AAA Championships.

He represented England in the 110 metres hurdles event, at the 1978 Commonwealth Games in Edmonton, Canada before becoming the British 110 metres hurdles champion after winning the British AAA Championships title at the 1979 AAA Championships.

Holtom competed in the event at two consecutive Olympic Games, in 1980 and 1984, as well as representing England and winning a silver medal in the 110 metres hurdles event, at the 1982 Commonwealth Games in Brisbane, Australia.

He was 1982 AAA champion and participated in the 1983 World Championships. In 1986 he represented England for the third time at the Commonwealth Games, competing in the 400 metres hurdles event at the 1986 Commonwealth Games in Edinburgh, Scotland.

== International competitions ==
Year	Competition	Venue	Position	Event	Notes
Representing Great Britain and England
1977	European Junior Championships	Donetsk, Soviet Union	2nd	110 m hurdles	14.29
1978	European Championships	Prague, Czechoslovakia	14th (sf)	110 m hurdles	14.27
1978	Commonwealth Games	Edmonton, Canada	10th (h)	110 m hurdles	14.85
1980	Olympic Games	Moscow, Soviet Union	10th (sf)	110 m hurdles	13.94
1982	European Indoor Championships	Milan, Italy	5th	60 m hurdles	7.83
1982	European Championships	Athens, Greece	15th (sf)	110 m hurdles	14.14
1982	Commonwealth Games	Brisbane, Australia	2nd	110 m hurdles	13.43
1983	European Indoor Championships	Budapest, Hungary	9th (sf)	60 m hurdles	7.77
1983	World Championships	Helsinki, Finland	9th (sf)	110 m hurdles	13.79
1984	Olympic Games	Los Angeles, United States	–	110 m hurdles	DQ
1986	Commonwealth Games	Edinburgh, United Kingdom	5th	400 m hurdles	50.58

== Personal bests ==
Outdoors

- 110 metres hurdles – 13.43 (+1.9 m/s, Brisbane 1982)
- 400 metres hurdles – 49.49 (London 1985)

Indoors

- 60 metres hurdles – 7.69 (Dortmund 1983)
