= Carmen Torres (athlete) =

Filipino sprinter

Personal information
- Nationality: Filipino
- Born: July 16, 1948 (age 77)

Sport
- Sport: Sprinting
- Event: 4 × 100 metres relay
Medal record
Women's athletics
Representing Philippines
Asian Championships
Gold medal – first place	1973 Marikina	4×400 m
Bronze medal – third place	1973 Marikina	4×100 m
Bronze medal – third place	1979 Tokyo	4×400 m

Carmen Torres (born July 16, 1948) is a Filipino sprinter. She competed in the women's 4 × 100 metres relay at the 1972 Summer Olympics.
