= Aida Mantawel =

Filipino sprinter

Personal information
- Nationality: Filipino
- Born: May 27, 1950 (age 76)
- Height: 5 ft 3 in (160 cm)
- Weight: 128 lb (58 kg)

Sport
- Sport: Sprinting
- Event: 400 metres
Medal record
Women's athletics
Representing Philippines
Asian Championships
Gold medal – first place	1973 Marikina	4×400 m
Bronze medal – third place	1973 Marikina	4×100 m

Aida Mantawel (born May 27, 1950) is a Filipino sprinter. She competed in the women's 400 metres at the 1972 Summer Olympics.
