= Lehmber Singh =

Indian athlete

Personal information
- Nationality: Indian

Sport
- Country: India
- Sport: Athletics
Medal record
Men's athletics
Representing India
Asian Games
Silver medal – second place	1974 Tehran	4 × 400 m
Bronze medal – third place	1974 Tehran	400 m hurdles

Lehmber Singh is an Indian athlete. He won a silver medal in 4 × 100 m relay and a bronze medal in the 400 metres hurdles in the 1974 Tehran Asian Games.
