= 1973 Asian Athletics Championships =

1973 Asian Championships
- Dates: November 18–23
- Host city: Marikina, Rizal, Philippines
- Venue: Rodriguez Sports Center
- Participation: at least 14 nations

The inaugural Asian Athletics Championships were held in 1973 at the Rodriguez Sports Center in Marikina, Rizal, Philippines from November 18–23, 1973.

== Medal summary ==
=== Men ===
Event	Gold		Silver		Bronze	
100 metres (wind: -0.5 m/s)	Anat Ratanapol; Thailand	10.4	Suchart Chairsuvaparb; Thailand	10.5	Takao Ishizawa; Japan	10.6
200 metres (wind: +0.2 m/s)	Anat Ratanapol; Thailand	21.0	Soo Wen-Ho; Taiwan	21.2	Tokal Mokalam; Philippines	21.6
400 metres	Yoshiharu Tomonaga; Japan	46.8	Koiiro Shika; Japan	47.6	Ho Mun Cheong; Singapore	47.8
800 metres	Muhammad Younis; Pakistan	1:51.2	Sri Ram Singh; India	1:51.5	Kazuyoshi Mizuno; Japan	1:52.2
1500 metres	Kazuyoshi Mizuno; Japan	3:47.4	Muhammad Younis; Pakistan	3:48.2	Dashondha Singh; India	3:50.4
5000 metres	Ichio Sato; Japan	14:16.9	Shivnath Singh; India	14:17.0	Katsuaki Isohata; Japan	14:18.2
10,000 metres	Ichio Sato; Japan	29:54.4	Shivnath Singh; India	29:54.8	Katsuaki Isohata; Japan	29:55.8
Marathon	Cho Je-Hyung; South Korea	2:27:31	Park Chang-Yuel; South Korea	2:33:45	Jit Bahadur Chetri; Nepal	2:35:38
3000 metre steeplechase	Takaharu Koyama; Japan	9:04.0	Shibib Dagher Al-Lami; Iraq	9:10.9	Mohammad Vojdanzadeh; Iran	9:22.0
110 metres hurdles (wind: -2.9 m/s)	Shigeo Oki; Japan	14.3	Ahmad Ishtiaq Mubarak; Malaysia	14.3	Marcelo Benauro; Philippines	14.4
400 metres hurdles	Abdulkadir Guiapar; Philippines	52.2	Talib Faisal Al-Saffar; Iraq	52.7	Tai Shi-Yan; Taiwan	53.1
4 × 100 metres relay	Japan; Takao Ishizawa; Kazuo Iwamoto; Susumu Shimizu; Yoshiharu Tomonaga	40.0	Thailand; Suchart Chairsuvaparb; Somsak Boontud; Prasit Boonprasert; Anat Ratanapol	40.0	India; Abdul Aziz; Adrian Kennedy; K. Natarajan; A.P. Ramaswamy	40.3
4 × 400 metre relay	Japan; Susumu Shimizu; Yoshiharu Tomonaga; Kazuyoshi Mizuno; Koiiro Shika	3:10.2	Philippines; Abdulkadir Guiapar; Clemente Lupangco; Santos Magno; Ernesto Tabayan	3:12.8	Singapore; Ho Mun Cheong; Godfrey Jalleh; Canagasabai Kunalan; Cheah Kim Tech	3:13.2
20 kilometre road walk	Yoshio Morikawa; Japan	1:11:31	Francis Xavier; India		Khoo Chong Beng; Malaysia	
High jump	Teymour Ghiassi; Iran	2.15	Kazunori Koshikawa; Japan	2.15	Yon Ismail; Malaysia	2.05
Pole vault	Hisaki Suzuki; Japan	4.36	Hong Sang-pyo; South Korea	4.36		
Long jump	Chen Chin-long; Taiwan	7.82w	Soo Wen-Ho; Taiwan	7.57w	Satish Pillai; India	7.53w
Triple jump	Mohinder Singh Gill; India	15.96w	Cheng Ming-chi; Taiwan	15.31	T.C. Yohannan; India	14.96
Shot put	Jagraj Singh Mann; India	17.00	Gurdeep Singh; India	16.37	Bahadur Singh Chouhan; India	15.75
Discus throw	Jalal Keshmiri; Iran	51.20	Praveen Kumar; India	49.08	Toji Hayashi; Japan	48.04
Hammer throw	Ajmer Singh; India	60.42	Jeung Sub-kil; South Korea	49.20	Oumvan Narith (Cambodia) Khmer Republic	41.24
Javelin throw	Allah Dad; Pakistan	63.58	Nashatar Singh Sidhu; Malaysia	63.28	Gopal Kidyoor; India	58.28
Decathlon	Vijay Singh Chauhan; India	7245	Junichi Onizuka; Japan	7076	Chen Chin-long; Taiwan	6752

=== Women ===
Event	Gold		Silver		Bronze	
100 metres (wind: +2.3 m/s)	Amelita Alanes; Philippines	11.6w	Michiko Morita; Japan	12.0w	Sayo Yamato; Japan	12.0w
200 metres (wind: +1.1 m/s)	Michiko Morita; Japan	24.7	Amelita Alanes; Philippines	25.0	Satomi Fukuda; Japan	25.2
400 metres	Nobuko Kawano; Japan	55.2	Keiko Ikoma; Japan	56.1	Maimoon Azlan; Singapore	56.1
800 metres	Nobuko Kawano; Japan	2:08.1	Chee Swee Lee; Singapore	2:08.1	Harumi Fugimoto; Japan	2:09.6
1500 metres	Miyako Inoue; Japan	4:26.8	Lee Chiu-Hsia; Taiwan	4:28.0	Rachel Halle; Israel	4:34.6
100 metres hurdles (wind: +4.3 m/s)	Tomomi Hayashida; Japan	13.6w	Lin Yet-Hsiang; Taiwan	13.9w	Gan Bee Wah; Singapore	14.2w
200 metres hurdles (wind: +3.5 m/s)	Tomomi Hayashida; Japan	27.6w	Heather Merican; Singapore	28.5w	Lin Yet-Hsiang; Taiwan	28.6w
4 × 100 metres relay	Japan; Sayo Yamato; Satomi Fukuda; Keiko Ikoma; Michiko Morita	46.7	Singapore; Glory Barnabas; Gan Bee Wah; Heather Merican; Shirley Fernando	47.0	Philippines ? Aida Mantawel; Carmen Torres; Amelita Alanes	47.7
4 × 400 metres relay	Philippines; Amelita Alanes; Aida Mantawel; Carmen Torres; Rosalinda Yumol	3:48.9	Singapore; Maimoon Azlan; Glory Barnabas; Chee Swee Lee; Hua Kim Chew	3:50.1	Taiwan; Lin Chun-yu; Chi Cheng-Yu 機政玉; Lee Chiu-hsia; Huang Chiu-Ching 黃秋錦	3:57.8
High jump	Orit Abramovich; Israel	1.68	Gladys Chai Ng Mei; Malaysia	1.58	Maryam Sedarati; Iran	1.58
Long jump	Kumi Kawada; Japan	6.07	Lin Yet-Hsiang; Taiwan	5.84	Li Hua-Wa; Taiwan	5.71
Shot put	Paik Ok-Ja; South Korea	15.05	Kayoko Hayashi; Japan	13.63	Chen Fu-Mei; Taiwan	12.93
Discus throw	Josephine de la Viña; Philippines	50.74	Kayoko Hayashi; Japan	45.28	Paik Ok-Ja; South Korea	44.52
Javelin throw	Mieko Takasaka; Japan	49.74	Erlinda Lavandia; Philippines	45.38	Proch Thin (Cambodia) Kampuchea	43.48
Pentathlon	Lin Chun-Yu; Taiwan	4025	Kumi Kawada; Japan	3963	Li Hua-Wa; Taiwan	3578

== Medal table ==
* Host nation (Philippines)

Rank	Nation	Gold	Silver	Bronze	Total
1	Japan (JPN)	18	8	8	34
2	India (IND)	4	5	6	15
3	Philippines (PHI)*	4	3	3	10
4	Taiwan (TWN)	2	6	7	15
5	South Korea (KOR)	2	3	1	6
6	Thailand (THA)	2	2	0	4
7	Pakistan (PAK)	2	1	0	3
8	Iran (IRN)	2	0	2	4
9	Israel (ISR)	1	0	1	2
10	Singapore (SIN)	0	4	4	8
11	Malaysia (MAS)	0	3	1	4
12	Iraq (IRQ)	0	2	0	2
13	Cambodia (CAM)	0	0	2	2
14	Nepal (NEP)	0	0	1	1
Totals (14 entries)		37	37	36	110
