= José Cartas =

Mexican hurdler

Personal information
- Nationality: Mexican
- Born: 19 September 1951 (age 74)
- Height: 1.83 m (6 ft 0 in)
- Weight: 78 kg (172 lb)

Sport
- Sport: Track and field
- Event: 110 metres hurdles

José Cartas (born 19 September 1951) is a retired Mexican hurdler. He competed in the men's 110 metres hurdles at the 1976 Summer Olympics.

== International competitions ==
Year	Competition	Venue	Position	Event	Notes
Representing Mexico
1974	Central American and Caribbean Games	Santo Domingo, Dominican Republic	4th	110 m hurdles	14.51 (w)
1975	Pan American Games	Mexico City, Mexico	10th (h)	110 m hurdles	14.75
1975	Universiade	Rome, Italy	27th (h)	100 m	11.34
1975	Universiade	Rome, Italy	8th	110 m hurdles	14.73
1976	Olympic Games	Montreal, Canada	21st (h)	110 m hurdles	14.56
1977	Central American and Caribbean Championships	Xalapa, Mexico	3rd	110 m hurdles	14.48
1977	Universiade	Sofia, Bulgaria	34th (h)	100 m	10.99
1977	Universiade	Sofia, Bulgaria	13th (h)	110 m hurdles	14.0

== Personal bests ==
- 110 metres hurdles – 13.8 (1976)
