= Chen Chin-long =

Taiwanese sprinter (born 1953)

Personal information
- Nationality: Taiwanese
- Born: 陳 進龍, Pinyin: Chén Jìn-lóng; 1 April 1953 (age 73)

Sport
- Sport: Sprinting
- Event: 4 × 100 metres relay
Medal record
Men's athletics
Representing Taiwan
Asian Championships
Gold medal – first place	1973 Marikina	Long jump
Bronze medal – third place	1973 Marikina	Decathlon
Bronze medal – third place	1975 Seoul	Triple jump

Chen Chin-long (born 1 April 1953) is a Taiwanese sprinter. He competed in the men's 4 × 100 metres relay at the 1972 Summer Olympics.
