= Reza Entezari =

Iranian athlete (1946–1999)

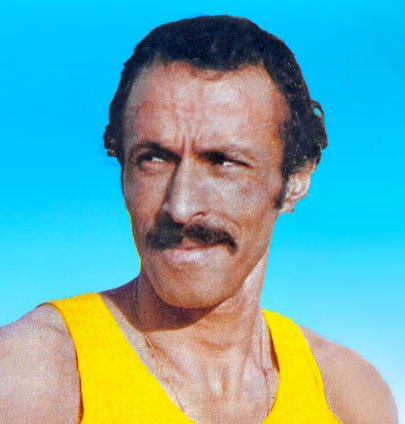
- Entezari in 1974

Personal information
- Born: 31 July 1946 Shemiran, Iran
- Died: 4 March 1999 (aged 52)

Sport
- Sport: Athletics
- Events: 400 m, 800 m

Achievements and titles
- Personal bests: 400 m – 46.69 (1974); 800 m – 1:48.50 (1974)
Medal record
Representing Iran
Asian Games
Silver medal – second place	1974 Tehran	400 m
Silver medal – second place	1974 Tehran	800 m
Bronze medal – third place	1974 Tehran	4×400 m

Mohammad Reza Entezari (Persian: محمدرضا انتظاری, 31 July 1946 – 4 March 1999) was an Iranian runner. He specialized in the 400 m and 800 m distances, in which he won two silver and one bronze medals at the 1974 Asian Games. He competed in the 400 m at the 1972 Summer Olympics and in the 800 m at the 1976 Summer Olympics, but failed to reach the finals.
