= Jean-Pierre Corval =

French hurdler

Personal information
- Nationality: French
- Born: 16 January 1949 (age 77) Crespières, France

Sport
- Sport: Track and field
- Event: 110 metres hurdles

Jean-Pierre Corval (born 16 January 1949) is a French hurdler. He competed in the men's 110 metres hurdles at the 1976 Summer Olympics.

Corval was an All-American hurdler for the UCLA Bruins track and field team, finishing 3rd in the 400 m hurdles at the 1972 NCAA University Division Outdoor Track and Field Championships.
