= Stratos Vasileiou =

Greek hurdler

Personal information
- Nationality: Greek
- Born: 12 December 1948 (age 77)

Sport
- Sport: Track and field
- Event: 110 metres hurdles

Stratos Vasileiou (born 12 December 1948) is a Greek hurdler. His personal best has been 13.86 sec in the event of Men's 100m hurdles. He has been the Greece's National record holder for the event, at his time. He competed in the men's 110 metres hurdles at the 1976 Summer Olympics.
