= Orit Abramovitz =

Israeli high jumper

Personal information
- Native name: אורית אברמוביץ
- Nationality: Israeli

Sport
- Country: Israel
- Sport: Athletics
Medal record
Women's athletics
Representing Israel
Asian Games
Gold medal – first place	1974 Tehran	High jump
Asian Championships
Gold medal – first place	1973 Marikina	High jump

Orit Abramovitz (Hebrew: אורית אברמוביץ) also spelt Abramovich, is an Israeli high jumper.

She won a gold medal in the high jump at the 1973 Asian Athletics Championships with a leap of 1,68 meters.

She won a gold medal in the high jump at the 1974 Asian Games with a leap of 1.78 meters. At that time she was 17 years old and lived in Netanya.

In 2010 she was awarded an honorary medal by the Knesset "for activities and achievements in athletics".
