= Christopher Okonkwo =

Nigerian shot putter

Personal information
- Nationality: Nigerian
- Born: 29 April 1941 (age 85)

Sport
- Sport: Athletics
- Event: Shot put

Christopher Okonkwo (born 29 April 1941) is a Nigerian athlete. He competed in the men's shot put at the 1972 Summer Olympics.
