= Kosala Sahabandu =

Sri Lankan sprinter (born 1949)

Personal information
- Full name: Kosala Sahabandu
- Nationality: Sri Lankan
- Born: 13 November 1949 (age 76) Matara, Sri Lanka
- Education: Mahinda College; Rahula College

Sport
- Country: Sri Lanka
- Sport: Track and field
- Event: Sprint (400m/800m)
Medal record
Men's athletics
Representing Sri Lanka
Event	1st	2nd	3rd
Asian Games	1	0	0
Olympic Games	0	0	0
Total	1	0	0
Event	1st	2nd	3rd
4 × 400 metres relay	1	0	0

Kosala Premaraja Sahabandu (born 13 November 1949), is a Sri Lankan athlete that competed in the 800 metres and 400 metres events.

In 1974 Sahabandu established a new Sri Lanka record for the 800 metres and represented Sri Lanka at the Asian Games in Tehran in the 4 x 400 metres relay winning a gold medal and setting a new Asian Games record of 3 minutes 7.4 seconds. He competed in the 1978 Asian Games in Bangkok but the team failed to medal.

Sahabandu was also a member of the Sri Lanka 4 x 400 relay team at the 1980 Summer Olympics in Moscow. The team came 6th in their first round heat (in a time of 3:14.4) and failed to qualify for further rounds.

In 1982 he competed in his third Asian Games but again the relay team failed to medal.

In 2007 he was appointed the chairman of the National Athletic Selection Committee.

== Achievements ==
Year	Competition	Venue	Position	Notes
Representing Sri Lanka
1974	Asian games	Tehran, Iran	1st	4 x 400 metres relay
1978	Asian Games	Bangkok, Thailand		4 x 400 metres relay
1980	Olympics	Moscow, Soviet Union		4 x 400 metres relay
1982	Asian Games	New Delhi, India		4 x 400 metres relay
