= Jan Pusty =

Polish hurdler

Personal information
- Nationality: Polish
- Born: 3 June 1952 (age 74) Koło, Poland

Sport
- Event: 110 metres hurdles
Medal record
Men's athletics
Representing Poland
European Championships
Silver medal – second place	1978 Prague	110 m hurdles
Summer Universiade
Silver medal – second place	1977 Sofia	110 m hurdles

Jan Pusty (born 3 June 1952) is a retired male hurdler from Poland. His personal best was 13.53 seconds on the 110m hurdles.

He won a silver medal at the 1978 European Championships in Athletics, and finished fifth at the 1980 Olympics.

== International competitions ==
Year	Competition	Venue	Position	Event	Notes
Representing Poland
1975	European Indoor Championships	Katowice, Poland	8th (sf)	60 m hurdles	7.85
1977	European Indoor Championships	San Sebastián, Spain	6th	60 m hurdles	7.91
1977	Universiade	Sofia, Bulgaria	2nd	110 m hurdles	13.53
1978	European Indoor Championships	Milan, Italy	5th	60 m hurdles	8.15
1978	European Championships	Prague, Czechoslovakia	2nd	110 m hurdles	13.55
1979	European Indoor Championships	Vienna, Austria	8th (sf)	60 m hurdles	7.88
1979	World Cup	Montreal, Canada	5th	110 m hurdles	13.88^{1}
1980	European Indoor Championships	Sindelfingen, West Germany	6th	60 m hurdles	7.87
1980	Olympic Games	Moscow, Soviet Union	5th	110 m hurdles	13.68

^{1}Representing Europe
