= Amelita Alanes =

Filipino sprinter (born 1952)

Personal information
- Nationality: Filipino
- Born: February 28, 1952 (age 74) La Carlota, Negros Occidental, Philippines

Sport
- Sport: Sprinting
- Event: 100 metres
Medal record
Women's athletics
Representing Philippines
Asian Championships
Gold medal – first place	1973 Marikina	100 m
Gold medal – first place	1973 Marikina	4×400 m
Silver medal – second place	1973 Marikina	200 m
Bronze medal – third place	1973 Marikina	4×100 m

Amelita Alanes-Saberon (born February 28, 1952) is a Filipino sprinter. She competed in the women's 100 metres at the 1972 Summer Olympics. She won gold in the women's 100 metres as well as the women's 4x400m relay race at the 1973 Asian championships.
