= Hussein Al-Taib Maki =

Saudi Arabian shot putter

Personal information
- Nationality: Saudi Arabian
- Born: 1 July 1941 (age 85)

Sport
- Sport: Athletics
- Event: Shot put

Hussein Al-Taib Maki (born 1 July 1941) is a Saudi Arabian athlete. He competed in the men's shot put at the 1972 Summer Olympics.
