= Eduard Pereverzev =

Personal information
- Full name: Eduard Pavlovich Pereverzev
- Born: 21 May 1953 Rostov-on-Don, Russian SFSR, Soviet Union
- Height: 1.92 m (6 ft 4 in)
- Weight: 85 kg (187 lb)

Sport
- Event: 110 metres hurdles
- Club: Zenit
- Coached by: Timofey Prokhorov
Medal record
Men's athletics
Representing Soviet Union
European Indoor Championships
Bronze medal – third place	1975 Katowice	60 m hurdles
Bronze medal – third place	1979 Vienna	60 m hurdles
Summer Universiade
Silver medal – second place	1975 Rome	110 m hurdles

Eduard Pavlovich Pereverzev (Эдуа́рд Па́влович Переве́рзев; born 21 May 1953) is a retired Soviet athlete who specialised in the sprint hurdles. He won two medals in the 60 metres hurdles at the European Indoor Championships and a silver medal in the 110 metres hurdles at the 1975 Summer Universiade.

== International competitions ==
Year	Competition	Venue	Position	Event	Notes
Representing the Soviet Union
1974	European Championships	Rome, Italy	15th (sf)	110 m hurdles	14.21 (w)
1975	European Indoor Championships	Katowice, Poland	3rd	60 m hurdles	7.74
1975	Universiade	Rome, Italy	2nd	110 m hurdles	13.94
1976	European Indoor Championships	Munich, West Germany	5th	60 m hurdles	8.00
1977	Universiade	Sofia, Bulgaria	6th	110 m hurdles	13.86
1978	European Indoor Championships	Milan, Italy	8th (sf)	60 m hurdles	7.86
1978	European Championships	Prague, Czechoslovakia	5th	110 m hurdles	13.83
1979	European Indoor Championships	Vienna, Austria	3rd	60 m hurdles	7.70

== Personal bests ==
Outdoor

- 110 metres hurdles – 13.61 (Karl-Marx-Stadt 1977)

Indoor

- 60 metres hurdles – 7.70 (Vienna 1979)
