= Chee Swee Lee =

Singaporean middle-distance runner

Personal information
- Nationality: Singaporean
- Born: 10 January 1955 (age 71) Singapore

Sport
- Sport: Track and field
- Event: Middle-distance running
Medal record
Women's athletics
Representing Singapore
Asian Games
Gold medal – first place	1974 Tehran	400 m
Asian Championships
Silver medal – second place	1973 Marikina	800 m
Silver medal – second place	1973 Marikina	4×400 m
Silver medal – second place	1975 Seoul	400 m
Bronze medal – third place	1975 Seoul	4×400 m
Southeast Asian Games
Gold medal – first place	1975 Bangkok	400 m
Gold medal – first place	1975 Bangkok	800 m
Silver medal – second place	1969 Rangoon	400 m
Silver medal – second place	1971 Kuala Lumpur	4x400 m
Silver medal – second place	1973 Singapore	400 m
Silver medal – second place	1973 Singapore	800 m
Silver medal – second place	1973 Singapore	4x400 m
Silver medal – second place	1975 Bangkok	4x400 m
Bronze medal – third place	1971 Kuala Lumpur	400 m

Chee Swee Lee (Chinese: 徐瑞莉; pinyin: Xú Ruìlì; born 10 January 1955) is a Singaporean retired middle-distance runner who competed in the women's 800 metres at the 1976 Summer Olympics. She was the first Singaporean woman to clinch a gold in athletics at the Asian Games—achieved at the women's 400 metres in 1974—and remained the only one until Shanti Pereira's victory at the women's 200 metres in 2023.

== Early life ==
Chee was born on 10 January 1955 in Singapore. The third of eight children, she attended Telok Kerau West Primary School and became its best-performing athletics student in 1966. At 14 years old, while still in secondary school, Chee represented Singapore in the 400m event at the 1969 Southeast Asian Peninsular Games (SEAP Games) in Rangoon, winning the silver medal. At the 1971 SEAP Games in Kuala Lumpur, Chee won the silver in the 4x400m relay and the bronze medal in the 400m event.

== Athletics career ==
At the 1973 SEAP Games in Singapore, Chee won two individual silvers in the 400 m and 800 m, as well as the team silver in the 4x400m relay.

At the 1974 Asian Games, Chee competed in the women's 400 m event and won the gold medal with 55.08 seconds, setting a Games record and Singapore national record for the 400 m, which remained unbroken until August 2017. Chee became the first Singaporean woman to win a gold at the Asian Games. She also won a silver in the women's 4x400 m and bronze in the 4x100 m relays. The same year, Chee was named Sportswoman of the Year in Singapore. At the 1975 SEAP Games, Chee won the 400 m and 800 m events and the silver medal at 4x400 m relay.

In 1976, Chee accepted a track scholarship at the University of Redlands in California. She qualified for the 800 m at the year's Olympics with a time of 2:07.4 minutes, but was unable to complete her heat in Montreal due to an injury to the Achilles tendon of her right leg, sustained during the National Amateur Athletic Union meet. Determined to continue running, Chee underwent surgery and reappeared in the circuit at the 1981 Southeast Asian Games in Manila, but failed to reach the podium in any events.

Chee subsequently enrolled at Mt. San Antonio College, coming in second at its conference championship with a time of 2:11.0 minutes. She then went to California State Polytechnic University, Pomona under an athletic scholarship and graduated with a degree in business administration. In 1990, Chee retired from professional athletics.

== Post-athletics life ==
After retiring from athletics, Chee moved to Diamond Bar, California with her husband Bob Cedillo, before beginning a career as a property agent based in Las Vegas, Nevada. In May 2011, she was presented with a medallion commemorating her participation at the 1976 Olympic Games. The national Olympian association, Olympian Singapore, has also officially recognised Chee as the 97th Olympian in the country's history.

Until Shanti Pereira won the women's 200 m in October 2023, Chee was the only Singaporean woman to have finished first at an Asian Games athletics event. Her 1974 gold medal is housed at the Singapore Sports Museum.
