= Jugraj Singh (athlete) =

Indian shot putter

Personal information
- Full name: Jugraj Singh Mann
- Nationality: Indian
- Born: 1950 (age 75–76)

Sport
- Sport: Athletics
- Events: Shot put, Discus throw, Hammer throw, Power Lifting and Weight Lifting
Medal record
Men's athletics
Representing India
Asian Championships
Gold medal – first place	1973 Rizal	Shot Put
Silver medal – second place	1975 Seoul	Shot Put

Jugraj Singh Maan (born 1950), also spelled Jagraj Singh Maan, is an Indian athlete. He competed in the men's shot put at the 1972 Summer Olympics. He played Olympics in 1972 Munich [West Germany]. He was also awarded with Dhyan Chand Khel Ratna Award in 2012 by President Of India for representing India. He coached many players in Shot Put and Discus Throw. He was national record holder in Shot Put and Discus throw. He was only Sportsperson from India at that time to participate and win both track and field championships and power lifting competitions. He was great player and coach for India. He is the only sports person who has got 2 India Colors in Athletics and Power Lifting. He represented India at the 1978 Commonwealth games in Canada.

He won a gold medal and silver medal in Shotput in the Asian Championships in Athletics in 1973 and 1975.
