= Charles Foster (hurdler) =

American hurdler (1953–2019)

Personal information
- Born: July 2, 1953 Greensboro, North Carolina
- Died: March 31, 2019 (aged 65)

Sport
- Sport: Athletics
- University team: North Carolina Central
Medal record
Men's Athletics
Representing United States
Pan American Games
Bronze medal – third place	1979 San Juan	110 m hurdles
IAAF World Cup
Bronze medal – third place	1977 Düsseldorf	110 m hurdles
Summer Universiade
Gold medal – first place	1975 Rome	110 m hurdles

Charles Wayne Foster (July 2, 1953 – March 31, 2019) was an American hurdler. He finished in fourth place, just off the podium at the 1976 Summer Olympics in Montreal while setting his lifetime personal best of 13.41. In 1974, he was the number one ranked hurdler in the world, number 2 in 1975 and in the top ten from 1973 until 1979.

== Career ==
Born in Greensboro, North Carolina, Foster ran for North Carolina Central University, winning the 1974 NCAA Championships. A few weeks later that season, he won the National Championships. On tour, he also won the French national championship. The NCAA victory qualified him for the World University Games the following year, where he won the Gold Medal. He was able to win the National Championship again in 1977 in a tie with UCLA's James Owens, making him the U.S. representative at the 1977 IAAF World Cup, where he won a bronze medal. He picked up an additional bronze medal in international competition at the 1979 Pan American Games. He also picked up a pair of National Indoor championships in 1975 and 1978.

Foster's career began at Gaffney High School in Gaffney, South Carolina, where he was state champion and the 1971 Junior National Champion in the 120 yard high hurdles.

After his athletic career, he went into coaching at the University of North Carolina, Clemson University and Virginia Tech. He was involved with the organizing committee for the 1996 Summer Olympics in Atlanta and with the 1999 Special Olympics.
