= Hans-Peter Gies =

German shot putter

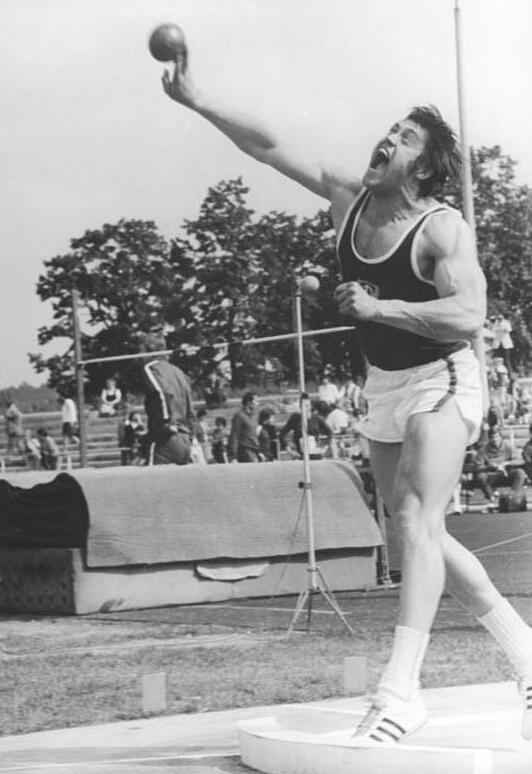
- Hans-Peter Gies in 1972

Personal information
- Nationality: East Germany
- Born: 9 May 1947 (age 79) Berlin, Germany
- Height: 1.94 m (6 ft 4 in)
- Weight: 105 kg (231 lb)

Sport
- Country: East Germany
- Sport: Athletics
- Event: Shot put
- Club: SC Dynamo Berlin

Achievements and titles
- Personal best: 21.31 m (1972)
Medal record
Men's athletics
Representing East Germany
European Championships
Bronze medal – third place	1969 Athens	Shot put

Hans-Peter Gies (born 9 May 1947) is a retired male shot putter, who competed for East Germany during his career. A two-time Olympian (1972 and 1976) he set his personal best (21.31 metres) in the men's shot put event on 25 August 1972 at a meet in Potsdam.

== Achievements ==
Year	Competition	Venue	Position	Notes
Representing East Germany
1969	European Championships	Athens, Greece	3rd	19.78 m
1972	Olympic Games	Munich, West Germany	4th	21.14 m
1976	Olympic Games	Montreal, Canada	5th	20.47 m
