= Thomas Munkelt =

East German hurdler and sprinter (born 1952)

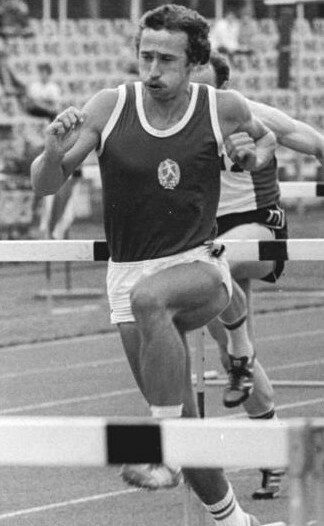
Medal record
Men's athletics
Representing East Germany
Olympic Games
Gold medal – first place	1980 Moscow	110 m hurdles
European Championships
Gold medal – first place	1978 Prague	110 m hurdles
Gold medal – first place	1982 Athens	110 m hurdles
Silver medal – second place	1982 Athens	4×100 m
European Indoor Championships
Gold medal – first place	1977 San Sebastián	60 m hurdles
Gold medal – first place	1978 Milan	60 m hurdles
Gold medal – first place	1979 Vienna	60 m hurdles
Bronze medal – third place	1973 Rotterdam	60 m hurdles
IAAF World Cup
Gold medal – first place	1977 Düsseldorf	110 m hurdles
Silver medal – second place	1979 Montreal	110 m hurdles
Friendship Games
Bronze medal – third place	1984 Moscow	110 m hurdles
Summer Universiade
Bronze medal – third place	1973 Moscow	110 m hurdles

Thomas Munkelt (born 3 August 1952) is a retired East German athlete, winner of 110 m hurdles at the 1980 Summer Olympics.

Born in Zedtlitz, Bezirk Leipzig, East Germany, Thomas Munkelt was a classic high hurdler who dominated European hurdling in the 1970s and early 1980s. Munkelt was the first athlete to break the 7.50 seconds barrier in the 60 m hurdles, when he ran a 7.48 seconds World Record in Budapest in 1983.

Munkelt came into the international athletics scene in 1975 when he won his first of nine East German national championship title and European Cup in 110 m hurdles. Although he finished disappointing fifth at the 1976 Summer Olympics, he won both World Cup and European Cup in 1977. The first international championships medal came, when Munkelt finished first at the 1978 European Championships.

Munkelt's career highlight came at the Moscow Olympics, where he beat second placed Alejandro Casañas from Cuba by 0.01 seconds. He also was a member of fifth placed 4 × 100 m relay team. He defended his title successfully at the 1982 European Championships and won silver as a member of a 4 × 100 relay team. He won again the European Cup in the next year, but finished only fifth at the first World Championships.

After hearing the East German government's decision to boycott the 1984 Summer Olympics, Munkelt decided to retire from athletics.

His personal best was 13.37 seconds, achieved in August 1977 in Helsinki. This ranks him seventh among German 110 m hurdlers, behind Florian Schwarthoff, Mike Fenner, Eric Kaiser, Falk Balzer, Thomas Blaschek and Sven Göhler.
