= Viktor Myasnikov =

Soviet hurdler

Personal information
- Born: 3 September 1948 (age 77) Chistopol, Soviet Union

Sport
- Sport: Track and field
Medal record
Representing Soviet Union
European Indoor Championships
Gold medal – first place	1976 Munich	60 m hurdles
Silver medal – second place	1977 San Sebastián	60 m hurdles

Viktor Nikolayevich Myasnikov (Russian: Виктор Николаевич Мясников) (born 3 September 1948) is a retired hurdler who represented the USSR. He won two medals at the European Indoor Championships. Myasnikov trained at Dynamo in Minsk.
