= Warren Parr =

Australian hurdler (born 1952)

Personal information
- Nationality: Australian
- Born: 25 January 1952 (age 74)

Sport
- Sport: Track and field
- Event: 110 metres hurdles
Medal record
Commonwealth Games
Bronze medal – third place	1978 Edmonton	110 m hurdles

Warren Parr (born 25 January 1952) is an Australian former hurdler. He competed in the men's 110 metres hurdles at the 1976 Summer Olympics.
