= Ishtiaq Mubarak =

Malaysian hurdler

Ishtiaq Mubarak Ahmed
Personal information
- Nationality: Malaysian
- Born: 6 February 1948
- Died: 9 August 2013 (aged 65)

Sport
- Sport: Hurdles
- Event: 110m

Ahmed Ishtiaq Mubarak (6 February 1948 – 9 August 2013) was a Malaysian hurdler. He competed in the 1968, 1972 and 1976 Summer Olympics. He was also the flag bearer for Malaysia at the 1976 Summer Olympics.
