= Fatwell Kimaiyo =

Kenyan hurdler (born 1947)

Fatwell Kimaiyo (born 1 July 1947) is a Kenyan former track and field athlete who competed in the 110 metres hurdles and 400 metres hurdles.

Born in Kapchemoiywo Kapsabet, Nandi County, he enlisted with the Kenya Police-General Service Unit in 1966 and retired as Senior Sergeant in 1978. He studied in the United States at the University of New Mexico in Albuquerque, where he competed for the New Mexico Lobos track and field team. He worked as Games Tutor/Coach in Rift Valley Technology Institute, Kenya Power, Kenyatta University, Moi University and University of Eldoret formerly Chepkoilel Campus. He coached elite athlete Tecla Lorupe and others.

He competed in the 1972 Summer Olympics, the 1974 Commonwealth Games, 1973 All-Africa Games and the 1978 All-Africa Games. He was the gold medallist at both the African Games and at the Commonwealth Games. He also participated in the 1975 Afro Latin Games and the East and Central Africa Games.

Married to Katherine Serem with 5 children Ibrahim Kiptanui Maiyo, Late Stephen Kimutai Maiyo, Paul Kipkirui Kosgei, Naomie Jepkogei and Laban Kiptoo Maiyo. He currently works as a farmer and a Coach in [Kapsabet and Eldoret], Kenya. He is also a member of Athletics Kenya in Kenya.
