= Phillip Mills =

Athlete and businessman from New-Zealand

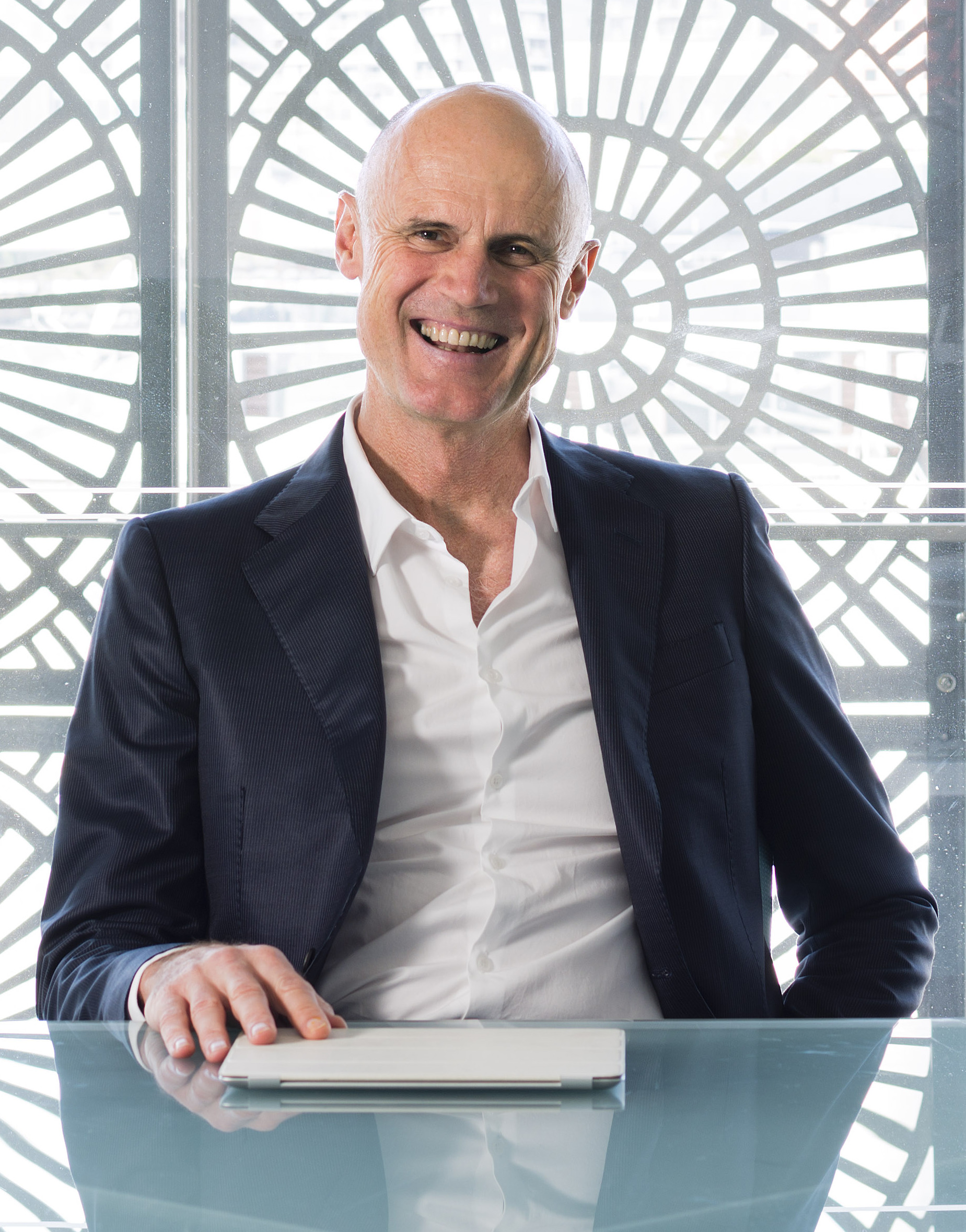
- Phillip Mills
- Born: 13 February 1955 (age 71); Auckland, New Zealand
- Occupations: Sportsman, businessman

Phillip Mills (born 13 February 1955) is a New Zealand former track and field athlete and businessman. He is the founder and executive director of Les Mills International and a co-founder of Pure Advantage, a green business lobby group.

== Sport ==
Multiple members of Phillip Mills' immediate family have represented New Zealand in track and field at the Olympic and Commonwealth Games. His father, Les Mills, has competed multiple times in both events. Phillip, along with his mother, Colleen, and younger sister, Donna, were all selected for the 1974 Commonwealth Games; however, Les was omitted from the team.

Mills competed in the 110m hurdles at the 1974 Commonwealth Games in Christchurch and in both the 110m and 400m hurdles at the 1978 Commonwealth Games in Edmonton, Alberta. He attended the University of California, Los Angeles (UCLA) on a track and field scholarship and graduated with a degree in philosophy in 1978.

== Business ==
After returning to New Zealand in 1979, Mills took an increasing role in the Les Mills fitness club business founded by his parents, Les and Colleen Mills, in 1968. The Les Mills business launched onto the stock market in 1984 and was taken over by an investment company in 1987. After the share market crash that year, Mills bought the business back.

In the early 1980s, Mills developed an exercise-to-music choreographed set of exercises and commercialised them based on licensing instructors to lead classes.

As of March 2015, there were 18 different programs distributed across 100 countries and by 2023, the workouts were being delivered to 21,000 gyms and clubs across the world. Phillip Mills has also developed a group fitness management system for maximising the commercial benefits of the Les Mills programs.

Mills’ views on fitness industry trends and the secrets of the most successful fitness facilities are regularly shared across the fitness industry.

== Sustainability and politics ==
Mills is an advocate for “green” business. His belief in the importance of sustainability has been widely publicised in New Zealand, and he has authored several articles on the financial benefits of a green economy along with the need for New Zealand to take action on climate change.

He is the founder of Pure Advantage, a group of New Zealand business leaders lobbying for green economic policy. In 2010, the Pure Advantage Trust commissioned a group of world-leading economists to review New Zealand's green growth opportunities.

Prompted by a perceived lack of action from the Government on climate change, in 2014, Mills gave $64,999 to the Labour Party and $60,000 to the Green Party. In 2023, Mills continued his support of the Labour Party, offering to match up to $50,000 in donations.

Mills' daughter Diana has also spoken to Forbes about how her parents encouraged feminism in fitness early by promoting "strong is the new skinny".

== Awards and recognition ==
- In 2004, Mills was Ernst & Young's New Zealand Entrepreneur of the Year.
- In 2005, Les Mills International was named New Zealand Services Exporter of the Year by NZ Trade and Enterprise.
- In 2009, Mills won Kea New Zealand's World Class New Zealand Award for New Thinking.
- In 2011, Mills was presented with an Australian Fitness Network Lifetime Achievement Award and was named on The National Business Review (NBR) Rich List.
- In 2022, Mills, his wife Jackie Mills, and his father Les were jointly inducted into the New Zealand Business Hall of Fame.

== Works and publications ==
In 2007 Mills and his wife, Jackie Mills, published Fighting Globesity – A Practical Guide To Personal Health and Global Sustainability (Random House).
