= Juan Lloveras =

Spanish hurdler

Personal information
- Nationality: Spanish
- Born: 2 August 1955 (age 70) Vilanova i la Geltrú, Catalonia, Spain

Sport
- Sport: Track and field
- Event: 400 metres hurdles

Juan Lloveras (born 2 August 1955) is a Spanish hurdler. He competed in the men's 400 metres hurdles at the 1980 Summer Olympics.
