= Vyacheslav Kulebyakin =

Soviet hurdler

Personal information
- Nationality: Soviet
- Born: 30 November 1950 (age 75) Leningrad, Soviet Union

Sport
- Sport: Track and field
- Event: 110 metres hurdles
Medal record
Men's athletics
Representing Soviet Union
European Indoor Championships
Silver medal – second place	1978 Milan	60 m hurdles
Summer Universiade
Bronze medal – third place	1977 Sofia	110 m hurdles

Vyacheslav Kulebyakin (born 30 November 1950) is a Soviet hurdler. He competed in the men's 110 metres hurdles at the 1976 Summer Olympics.
