= Max Binnington =

Australian sprinter (born 1949)

Personal information
- Nationality: Australian
- Born: 8 March 1949 (age 77)

Sport
- Sport: Sprinting
- Event: 4 × 400 metres relay
Medal record
Men's Athletics
British Commonwealth Games
Bronze medal – third place	1974 Christchurch	110 m hurdles
Silver medal – second place	1978 Edmonton	110 m hurdles

Maxwell Clifford Binnington OAM (born 8 March 1949) is an Australian sprinter. He competed in the men's 4 × 400 metres relay at the 1976 Summer Olympics.
