= Giuseppe Buttari =

Italian hurdler (born 1951)

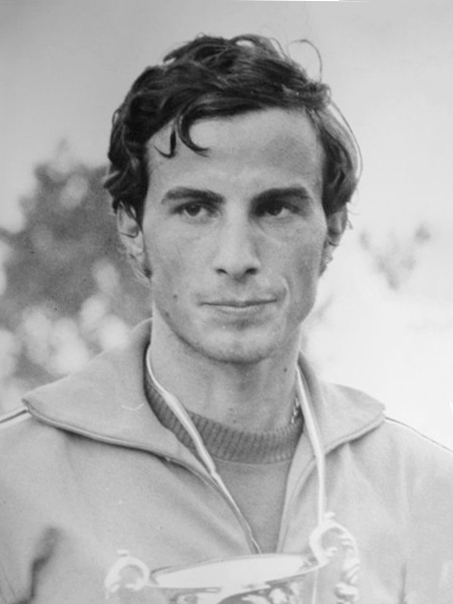
- Giuseppe Buttari in 1971

Personal information
- Nationality: Italian
- Born: 16 February 1951 (age 75) San Felice Circeo, Italy
- Height: 1.83 m (6 ft 0 in)
- Weight: 74 kg (163 lb)

Sport
- Country: Italy
- Sport: Athletics
- Event: Hurdling
- Club: G.S. Fiamme Gialle

Achievements and titles
- Personal bests: 110 m hs: 13.70 (1979); 60 m hs: 7.86 (1978)
Medal record
European Indoor Championships
Bronze medal – third place	Milan 1978	60 m hs
Mediterranean Games
Silver medal – second place	Split 1979	110 m hs

Giuseppe Buttari (born 16 February 1951) is a retired Italian hurdler. His personal best time was 13.70 seconds, achieved in September 1979 in Mexico City. The Italian record currently belongs to Andrea Giaconi with 13.35 seconds.

== Achievements ==
Year	Tournament	Venue	Result	Extra
1974	European Indoor Championships	Gothenburg, Sweden	5th	60 m hurdles
1974	European Championships	Rome, Italy	5th	110 m hurdles
1978	European Indoor Championships	Milan, Italy	3rd	60 m hurdles
1978	European Championships	Prague, Czechoslovakia	4th	110 m hurdles
1979	Mediterranean Games	Split, Yugoslavia	2nd	110 m hurdles

== National titles ==
He won 10 national championships at individual senior level.

- Italian Athletics Championships
  - 100 m hs: 1972, 1974, 1975, 1976, 1978, 1979
- Italian Indoor Athletics Championships
  - 60 m hs: 1973, 1975, 1978, 1980

== See also ==
- 110 m hurdles winners of Italian Athletics Championships
