= Borisav Pisić =

Bosnian hurdler (1949–2015)

Personal information
- Born: 31 January 1949 Zvornik, Yugoslavia
- Died: 21 April 2015 (aged 66) Belgrade, Serbia

Sport
- Sport: Track and field
Medal record
Representing Yugoslavia
Men's athletics
Mediterranean Games
Gold medal – first place	1975 Algiers	110 m hurdles
Gold medal – first place	1979 Split	110 m hurdles
Universiade
Bronze medal – third place	1975 Rome	110 m hurdles

Borisav Pisić (31 January 1949 – 21 April 2015) was a Bosnian hurdler who competed in the 1980 Summer Olympics.
