= Gianni Ronconi =

Italian hurdler

Personal information
- Nationality: Italian
- Born: 4 November 1952 (age 73) Bagnolo San Vito, Italy
- Height: 1.89 m (6 ft 2 in)
- Weight: 84 kg (185 lb)

Sport
- Country: Italy
- Sport: Athletics
- Event: 110 metres hurdles

Gianni Ronconi (born 4 November 1952) is an Italian hurdler who competed at the 1976 Summer Olympics for the Italian team.
