= 1999 World Championships in Athletics – Men's 110 metres hurdles =

These are the official results of the Men's 110 metres hurdles event at the 1999 IAAF World Championships in Seville, Spain. There were a total number of 42 participating athletes, with six qualifying heats, four quarter-finals, two semi-finals and the final held on Wednesday August 25, 1999, at 20:25h.

== Medalists ==
| Gold | (United Kingdom) Colin Jackson; Great Britain (GBR) |
| Silver | Anier García; Cuba (CUB) |
| Bronze | Duane Ross; United States (USA) |

== Final ==
| RANK | FINAL | TIME |
|---|---|---|
| | Colin Jackson (GBR) | 13.04 |
| | Anier García (CUB) | 13.07 |
| | Duane Ross (USA) | 13.12 |
| 4. | Tony Dees (USA) | 13.22 |
| 5. | Falk Balzer (GER) | 13.26 |
| 6. | Yoel Hernández (CUB) | 13.30 |
| 7. | Florian Schwarthoff (GER) | 13.39 |
| 8. | Jonathan N'Senga (BEL) | 13.54 |

== Semi-final ==
- Held on Tuesday 1999-08-24

| RANK | HEAT 1 | TIME |
|---|---|---|
| 1. | Duane Ross (USA) | 13.14 |
| 2. | Florian Schwarthoff (GER) | 13.30 |
| 3. | Yoel Hernández (CUB) | 13.32 |
| 4. | Falk Balzer (GER) | 13.32 |
| 5. | Peter Coghlan (IRL) | 13.35 |
| 6. | Erik Batte (CUB) | 13.40 |
| 7. | Robin Korving (NED) | 13.45 |
| 8. | Elmar Lichtenegger (AUT) | 13.52 |

| RANK | HEAT 2 | TIME |
|---|---|---|
| 1. | Anier García (CUB) | 13.18 |
| 2. | Colin Jackson (GBR) | 13.19 |
| 3. | Tony Dees (USA) | 13.30 |
| 4. | Jonathan N'Senga (BEL) | 13.47 |
| 5. | Dan Philibert (FRA) | 13.49 |
| 6. | Staņislavs Olijars (LAT) | 13.70 |
| 7. | Dudley Dorival (HAI) | 13.86 |
| | Allen Johnson (USA) | DNS |

== Quarter-finals ==
- Held on Monday 1999-08-23

| RANK | HEAT 1 | TIME |
|---|---|---|
| 1. | Duane Ross (USA) | 13.13 |
| 2. | Anier García (CUB) | 13.20 |
| 3. | Robin Korving (NED) | 13.30 |
| 4. | Peter Coghlan (IRL) | 13.37 |
| 5. | Tomasz Ścigaczewski (POL) | 13.54 |
| 6. | Satoru Tanigawa (JPN) | 13.58 |
| 7. | Steve Brown (TRI) | 13.62 |
| 8. | Matti Niemi (FIN) | 14.17 |

| RANK | HEAT 2 | TIME |
|---|---|---|
| 1. | Colin Jackson (GBR) | 13.13 |
| 2. | Tony Dees (USA) | 13.29 |
| 3. | Jonathan N'Senga (BEL) | 13.37 |
| 4. | Dudley Dorival (HAI) | 13.42 |
| 5. | Chen Yanhao (CHN) | 13.53 |
| 6. | Ralf Leberer (GER) | 13.54 |
| 7. | Kyle Vander-Kuyp (AUS) | 13.56 |
| 8. | William Erese (NGR) | 13.65 |

| RANK | HEAT 3 | TIME |
|---|---|---|
| 1. | Staņislavs Olijars (LAT) | 13.30 |
| 2. | Elmar Lichtenegger (AUT) | 13.43 |
| 3. | Erik Batte (CUB) | 13.48 |
| 4. | Florian Schwarthoff (GER) | 13.50 |
| 5. | Robert Kronberg (SWE) | 13.56 |
| 6. | Jean-Marc Grava (FRA) | 13.63 |
| 7. | Hipólito Montesinos (ESP) | 13.78 |
| | Mark Crear (USA) | DQ |

| RANK | HEAT 4 | TIME |
|---|---|---|
| 1. | Yoel Hernández (CUB) | 13.35 |
| 2. | Falk Balzer (GER) | 13.38 |
| 3. | Dan Philibert (FRA) | 13.47 |
| 4. | Allen Johnson (USA) | 13.48 |
| 5. | Igor Kovác (SVK) | 13.56 |
| 6. | Andrea Giaconi (ITA) | 13.61 |
| 7. | Shaun Bownes (RSA) | 13.74 |
| 8. | Jeffrey Jackson (ISV) | 14.32 |

== Heats ==
- Held on Monday 1999-08-23

| RANK | HEAT 1 | TIME |
|---|---|---|
| 1. | Duane Ross (USA) | 13.39 |
| 2. | Dudley Dorival (HAI) | 13.42 |
| 3. | Florian Schwarthoff (GER) | 13.50 |
| 4. | Robert Kronberg (SWE) | 13.62 |
| 5. | Hipólito Montesinos (ESP) | 13.74 |
| 6. | Márcio Simão de Souza (BRA) | 13.83 |
| 7. | Paul Sehzue (LBR) | 14.68 |

| RANK | HEAT 2 | TIME |
|---|---|---|
| 1. | Mark Crear (USA) | 13.30 |
| 2. | Tomasz Ścigaczewski (POL) | 13.54 |
| 3. | Chen Yanhao (CHN) | 13.55 |
| 4. | Peter Coghlan (IRL) | 13.64 |
| 5. | Luiz André Balcers (BRA) | 13.84 |
| 6. | Adrian Woodley (CAN) | 13.95 |
| 7. | Ken-ichi Sakurai (JPN) | 14.01 |

| RANK | HEAT 3 | TIME |
|---|---|---|
| 1. | Allen Johnson (USA) | 13.46 |
| 2. | Dan Philibert (FRA) | 13.53 |
| 3. | Yoel Hernández (CUB) | 13.53 |
| 4. | Igor Kovác (SVK) | 13.63 |
| 5. | Steve Brown (TRI) | 13.67 |
| 6. | William Erese (NGR) | 13.76 |
| 7. | Victor Houston (BAR) | 13.86 |

| RANK | HEAT 4 | TIME |
|---|---|---|
| 1. | Falk Balzer (GER) | 13.35 |
| 2. | Jonathan N'Senga (BEL) | 13.44 |
| 3. | Robin Korving (NED) | 13.45 |
| 4. | Satoru Tanigawa (JPN) | 13.65 |
| 5. | Shaun Bownes (RSA) | 13.65 |
| 6. | Emiliano Pizzoli (ITA) | 13.79 |
| 7. | Arlindo Pinheiro (STP) | 15.74 |

| RANK | HEAT 5 | TIME |
|---|---|---|
| 1. | Colin Jackson (GBR) | 13.19 |
| 2. | Staņislavs Olijars (LAT) | 13.28 |
| 3. | Tony Dees (USA) | 13.57 |
| 4. | Erik Batte (CUB) | 13.62 |
| 5. | Jean-Marc Grava (FRA) | 13.64 |
| 6. | Jeffrey Jackson (ISV) | 13.64 |
| 7. | Andrey Kislykh (RUS) | 13.83 |

| RANK | HEAT 6 | TIME |
|---|---|---|
| 1. | Anier García (CUB) | 13.40 |
| 2. | Elmar Lichtenegger (AUT) | 13.50 |
| 3. | Kyle Vander-Kuyp (AUS) | 13.55 |
| 4. | Ralf Leberer (GER) | 13.65 |
| 5. | Matti Niemi (FIN) | 13.66 |
| 6. | Andrea Giaconi (ITA) | 13.71 |
| | Tony Jarrett (GBR) | DNS |
