= 2001 World Championships in Athletics – Men's 110 metres hurdles =

These are the official results of the Men's 110 metres hurdles event at the 2001 IAAF World Championships in Edmonton, Canada. There were a total number of 41 participating athletes, with seven qualifying heats, three semi-finals and the final held on Thursday August 9, 2001 at 21:15h.

== Medalists ==
| Gold | Allen Johnson; United States (USA) |
| Silver | Anier García; Cuba (CUB) |
| Bronze | Dudley Dorival; Haiti (HAI) |

== Records ==
Standing records prior to the 2001 World Athletics Championships
| World Record | Colin Jackson (GBR) | 12.91 | August 20, 1993 | Stuttgart, Germany |
| Event Record | Colin Jackson (GBR) | 12.91 | August 20, 1993 | Stuttgart, Germany |
| Season Best | Allen Johnson (USA) | 13.15 | July 6, 2001 | Paris, France |

== Final ==
| RANK | FINAL | TIME |
|---|---|---|
| | Allen Johnson (USA) | 13.04 |
| | Anier García (CUB) | 13.07 |
| | Dudley Dorival (HAI) | 13.25 |
| 4. | Yoel Hernández (CUB) | 13.30 |
| 5. | Robert Kronberg (SWE) | 13.51 |
| 6. | Yevgeniy Pechonkin (RUS) | 13.52 |
| 7. | Dawane Wallace (USA) | 13.76 |
| 8. | Shaun Bownes (RSA) | 13.84 |

== Semi-final ==
- Held on Wednesday 2001-08-08

| RANK | HEAT 1 | TIME |
|---|---|---|
| 1. | Anier García (CUB) | 13.19 |
| 2. | Allen Johnson (USA) | 13.27 |
| 3. | Shaun Bownes (RSA) | 13.29 |
| 4. | Elmar Lichtenegger (AUT) | 13.42 |
| 5. | Peter Coghlan (IRL) | 13.61 |
| 6. | Masato Naito (JPN) | 13.73 |
| 7. | Jonathan Nsenga (BEL) | 13.89 |
| — | Florian Schwarthoff (GER) | DNF |

| RANK | HEAT 2 | TIME |
|---|---|---|
| 1. | Yevgeni Pechonkin (RUS) | 13.38 |
| 2. | Robert Kronberg (SWE) | 13.38 |
| 3. | Dawane Wallace (USA) | 13.41 |
| 4. | Mike Fenner (GER) | 13.49 |
| 5. | Yuniel Hernández (CUB) | 13.56 |
| 6. | Stephen Jones (BAR) | 13.71 |
| 7. | Joseph-Berlioz Randriamihaja (MAD) | 13.77 |
| — | Tony Jarrett (GBR) | DQ |

| RANK | HEAT 3 | TIME |
|---|---|---|
| 1. | Yoel Hernández (CUB) | 13.33 |
| 2. | Dudley Dorival (HAI) | 13.43 |
| 3. | Terrence Trammell (USA) | 13.44 |
| 4. | Liu Xiang (CHN) | 13.51 |
| 5. | Zhivko Videnov (BUL) | 13.55 |
| 6. | Jerome Crews (GER) | 13.55 |
| 7. | Artur Kohutek (POL) | 13.60 |
| 8. | Mubarak Ata Mubarak (KSA) | 13.98 |

== Heats ==
Held on Tuesday 2001-08-07

| RANK | HEAT 1 | TIME |
|---|---|---|
| 1. | Allen Johnson (USA) | 13.59 |
| 2. | Yoel Hernández (CUB) | 13.63 |
| 3. | Tony Jarrett (GBR) | 13.64 |
| 4. | Masato Naito (JPN) | 13.80 |
| 5. | Gabriel Burnett (BAR) | 13.93 |
| 6. | Andrey Sklyarenko (KAZ) | 14.02 |
| 7. | Hendrey Ah-Tchoy (TAH) | 16.34 |

| RANK | HEAT 2 | TIME |
|---|---|---|
| 1. | Yuniel Hernández (CUB) | 13.56 |
| 2. | Florian Schwarthoff (GER) | 13.58 |
| 3. | Robert Kronberg (SWE) | 13.59 |
| 4. | Joseph-Berlioz Randriamihaja (MAD) | 13.61 |
| 5. | Paulo Villar (COL) | 13.82 |
| 6. | Paul Gray (GBR) | 13.96 |
| 7. | Sadros Sanchez (PAN) | 14.34 |

| RANK | HEAT 3 | TIME |
|---|---|---|
| 1. | Anier García (CUB) | 13.21 |
| 2. | Mike Fenner (GER) | 13.46 |
| 3. | Zhivko Videnov (BUL) | 13.59 |
| 4. | Stephen Jones (BAR) | 13.72 |
| 5. | Satoru Tanigawa (JPN) | 13.85 |
| 6. | David Ilariani (GEO) | 14.08 |
| — | Damien Greaves (GBR) | DQ |

| RANK | HEAT 4 | TIME |
|---|---|---|
| 1. | Dawane Wallace (USA) | 13.28 |
| 2. | Artur Kohutek (POL) | 13.54 |
| 3. | Liu Xiang (CHN) | 13.60 |
| 4. | Jerome Crews (GER) | 13.60 |
| 5. | Jarno Jokihaara (FIN) | 13.89 |
| 6. | Damjan Zlatnar (SLO) | 13.97 |

| RANK | HEAT 5 | TIME |
|---|---|---|
| 1. | Terrence Trammell (USA) | 13.40 |
| 2. | Yevgeniy Pechonkin (RUS) | 13.58 |
| 3. | Jonathan Nsenga (BEL) | 13.74 |
| 4. | Felipe Vivancos (ESP) | 13.84 |
| 5. | Márcio de Souza (BRA) | 13.88 |
| 6. | Sultan Tucker (LBR) | 13.92 |
| 7. | Raiea Khrasat (JOR) | 15.01 |

| RANK | HEAT 6 | TIME |
|---|---|---|
| 1. | Dudley Dorival (HAI) | 13.33 |
| 2. | Shaun Bownes (RSA) | 13.38 |
| 3. | Elmar Lichtenegger (AUT) | 13.39 |
| 4. | Peter Coghlan (IRL) | 13.57 |
| 5. | Mubarak Ata Mubarak (KSA) | 13.72 |
| 6. | Maurice Wignall (JAM) | 13.88 |
| 7. | Omar Abdullah Al-Rawahi (UAE) | 19.01 |
