= Athletics at the 2000 Summer Olympics – Men's 110 metres hurdles =

Men's 110 metres hurdles at the Games of the XXVII Olympiad
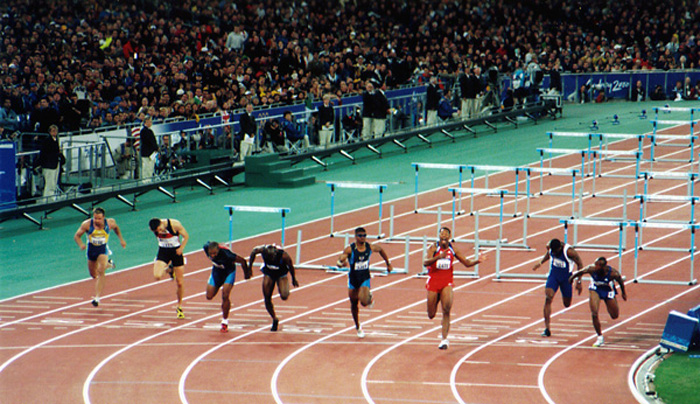
- Finish of the final
- Venue: Stadium Australia
- Date: 24 & 25 September
- Competitors: 44 from 31 nations
- Winning time: 13.00

Medalists
| 1st place, gold medalist(s) | | Anier García; Cuba |
| 2nd place, silver medalist(s) | | Terrence Trammell; United States |
| 3rd place, bronze medalist(s) | | Mark Crear; United States |

Video on YouTube Official Video Highlights @10:00

The men's 110 metre hurdles at the 2000 Summer Olympics as part of the athletics programme were held at Stadium Australia on Sunday 24 September and Monday 25 September 2000. Forty-four athletes from 31 nations competed. The maximum number of athletes per nation had been set at 3 since the 1930 Olympic Congress. The event was won by Anier García of Cuba, the nation's first championship in the event and first medal in the event since 1980. Mark Crear's bronze made him the 10th man to win a second medal in the event.

== Summary ==
After a false start eliminated nobody, on the second try the field started even. Anier García accelerated his first few steps better and gained a few centimeter lead over the first barrier, which he rattled. Typically fast starting Terrence Trammell was just slightly awkward on his second step losing a slight amount of ground. Defending champion Allen Johnson was close to Garcia, and even after clobbering the first two hurdles, he was pulling even. The entire lead group hit the third hurdle, by now Johnson and Garcia had a clear lead, with Trammell a clear third place. Johnson continued to hit hurdles, losing ground to Garcia, while Mark Crear was emerging ahead of world record holder Colin Jackson by not touching his hurdles while Jackson hit hurdle 4 awkwardly enough to pull him out of contention. Johnson hit the ninth hurdle with his lead heel, not even close to getting over the hurdle. The awkwardness of riding the last hurdle down to the ground lost his forward momentum. Garcia had a metre and a half lead at the finish over Trammell, and while Crear did hit the last hurdle he was able to beat Johnson to the line for bronze.

== Background ==
This was the 24th appearance of the event, which is one of 12 athletics events to have been held at every Summer Olympics. The top four finishers from 1996 all returned, along with one other finalist: gold medalist Allen Johnson and silver medalist Mark Crear of the United States, bronze medalist Florian Schwarthoff of Germany (who had also finished fifth in 1992), fourth-place finisher Colin Jackson of Great Britain, and seventh-place finisher Kyle Vander-Kuyp of Australia. Jackson had been in the last three finals, taking silver in 1988 and seventh in 1992. As in 1996, the favorites were Johnson and Jackson (winners of the last four world championships), though Anier García of Cuba had emerged as a challenger after taking second in the 1999 worlds.

Barbados, Liberia, São Tomé and Príncipe, and Trinidad and Tobago each made their first appearance in the event. The United States made its 23rd appearance, most of any nation (having missed only the boycotted 1980 Games).

== Qualification ==
Each National Olympic Committee was permitted to enter up to three athletes that had run 13.70 seconds or faster during the qualification period. The maximum number of athletes per nation had been set at 3 since the 1930 Olympic Congress. If an NOC had no athletes that qualified under that standard, one athlete that had run 13.85 seconds or faster could be entered.

== Competition format ==
The competition used the four-round format previously used in 1960 and since 1988, still using the eight-man semifinals and finals used since 1964. The "fastest loser" system, also introduced in 1964, was used in the first round.

The top four runners in each of the initial six heats automatically qualified for the second round. The next eight fastest runners from across the heats also qualified. Those 32 runners competed in 4 heats in the quarterfinals, with the top four runners from each heat qualifying for the semifinals. There were two semifinals, and only the top four from each heat advanced to the final.

== Records ==
These were the standing world and Olympic records (in seconds) prior to the 2000 Summer Olympics.

| World record | Colin Jackson (GBR) | 12.91 | Stuttgart, Germany | 20 August 1993 |
| Olympic record | Allen Johnson (USA) | 12.95 | Atlanta, United States | 29 July 1996 |

No new world or Olympic records were set during the competition. The following national records were established during the competition:

| Nation | Athlete | Round | Time |
|---|---|---|---|
| Haiti | Dudley Dorival | Heat 2 | 13.33 |
| São Tomé and Príncipe | Arlindo Pinheiro | Heat 6 | 15.65 |
| Cuba | Anier García | Final | 13.00 |

== Schedule ==
All times are Australian Eastern Standard Time (UTC+10)

| Date | Time | Round |
|---|---|---|
| Sunday, 24 September 2000 | 10:00; 20:20 | Round 1 Quarterfinals |
| Monday, 25 September 2000 | 18:40; 20:40 | Semifinals; Final |

== Results ==
=== Round 1 ===
==== Heat 1 ====
| Rank | Lane | Athlete | Nation | Reaction | Time | Notes |
|---|---|---|---|---|---|---|
| 1 | 2 | Mark Crear | United States | 0.228 | 13.44 | Q |
| 2 | 1 | Staņislavs Olijars | Latvia | 0.228 | 13.56 | Q |
| 3 | 8 | Kyle Vander-Kuyp | Australia | 0.152 | 13.67 | Q |
| 4 | 5 | Paul Sehzue | Liberia | 0.216 | 14.18 | Q |
| 5 | 5 | Charles Allen | Guyana | 0.225 | 14.21 | |
| 6 | 6 | Ralf Leberer | Germany | 0.164 | 56.74 | q |
| — | 7 | Tony Jarrett | Great Britain | 0.178 s | DSQ | R163.2 |
| — | 3 | Marcin Kuśzewski | Poland | 0.200 s | DNF | |
| | | | | Wind: -0.9 m/s | | |

==== Heat 2 ====
| Rank | Lane | Athlete | Nation | Reaction | Time | Notes |
|---|---|---|---|---|---|---|
| 1 | 4 | Dudley Dorival | Haiti | 0.203 | 13.33 | Q, NR |
| 2 | 1 | Yoel Hernández | Cuba | 0.173 | 13.53 | Q |
| 2 | 3 | Shaun Bownes | South Africa | 0.187 | 13.53 | Q |
| 4 | 8 | Falk Balzer | Germany | 0.183 | 13.67 | Q |
| 5 | 5 | Steve Brown | Trinidad and Tobago | 0.182 | 13.92 | q |
| 6 | 7 | Peter Coghlan | Ireland | 0.198 | 14.03 | q |
| 7 | 2 | Robert Foster | Jamaica | 0.221 | 14.33 | |
| — | 6 | Mubarak Mubarak | Saudi Arabia | 0.423 | DSQ | |
| | | | | Wind: +0.4 m/s | | |

==== Heat 3 ====
| Rank | Lane | Athlete | Nation | Reaction | Time | Notes |
|---|---|---|---|---|---|---|
| 1 | 8 | Anier García | Cuba | 0.235 | 13.60 | Q |
| 2 | 4 | Andrey Kislykh | Russia | 0.167 | 13.77 | Q |
| 3 | 5 | Balázs Kovács | Hungary | 0.140 | 13.83 | Q |
| 4 | 8 | Jean-Marc Grava | France | 0.200 | 14.01 | Q |
| 5 | 3 | Gabriel Burnett | Barbados | 0.258 | 14.23 | |
| 6 | 2 | Raphaël Monachon | Switzerland | 0.221 | 14.80 | |
| 7 | 7 | Zhivko Videnov | Bulgaria | 0.122 | DNF | |
| | | | | Wind: +0.3 m/s | | |

==== Heat 4 ====
| Rank | Lane | Athlete | Nation | Reaction | Time | Notes |
|---|---|---|---|---|---|---|
| 1 | 6 | Florian Schwarthoff | Germany | 0.162 | 13.55 | Q |
| 2 | 4 | Robert Kronberg | Sweden | 0.264 | 13.58 | Q |
| 3 | 1 | Terrence Trammell | United States | 0.250 | 13.59 | Q |
| 4 | 8 | Emiliano Pizzoli | Italy | 0.158 | 13.65 | Q |
| 5 | 3 | Marcio Simao de Souza | Brazil | 0.170 | 13.70 | q |
| 6 | 7 | Jeff Jackson | Virgin Islands | 0.208 | 14.05 | q |
| 7 | 5 | Victor Houston | Barbados | 0.230 | 14.06 | |
| 8 | 2 | Paolo Della Santa | Switzerland | 0.190 | 14.12 | |
| | | | | Wind: -0.6 m/s | | |

==== Heat 5 ====
| Rank | Lane | Athlete | Nation | Reaction | Time | Notes |
|---|---|---|---|---|---|---|
| 1 | 3 | Allen Johnson | United States | 0.174 | 13.50 | Q |
| 2 | 7 | Evgeny Pechenkin | Russia | 0.216 | 13.56 | Q |
| 3 | 6 | Jonathan Nsenga | Belgium | 0.185 | 13.57 | Q |
| 4 | 2 | Elmar Lichtenegger | Austria | 0.212 | 13.65 | Q |
| 5 | 8 | Levente Csillag | Hungary | 0.257 | 13.66 | q |
| 6 | 5 | Joseph-Berlioz Randriamihaja | Madagascar | 0.218 | 13.86 | q |
| 7 | 4 | Damien Greaves | Great Britain | 0.303 | 14.01 | q |
| | | | | Wind: +0.1 m/s | | |

==== Heat 6 ====
| Rank | Lane | Athlete | Nation | Reaction | Time | Notes |
|---|---|---|---|---|---|---|
| 1 | 1 | Colin Jackson | Great Britain | 0.135 | 13.38 | Q |
| 2 | 7 | Tomasz Ścigaczewski | Poland | 0.166 | 13.53 | Q |
| 3 | 5 | Andrea Giaconi | Italy | 0.203 | 13.62 | Q |
| 4 | 2 | Adrian Woodley | Canada | 0.175 | 13.71 | Q |
| 5 | 3 | Satoru Tanigawa | Japan | 0.143 | 13.74 | q |
| 6 | 4 | Arlindo Pinheiro | São Tomé and Príncipe | 0.233 | 15.65 | NR |
| — | 6 | Robin Korving | Netherlands | DNS | | |
| — | 8 | Igor Kováč | Slovakia | DNS | | |
| | | | | Wind: -0.8 m/s | | |

==== Overall results for round 1 ====
| Rank | Athlete | Nation | Heat | Lane | Place | Time | Qual. | Record |
|---|---|---|---|---|---|---|---|---|
| 1 | Dudley Dorival | Haiti | 2 | 4 | 1 | 13.33 s | Q | NR |
| 2 | Colin Jackson | Great Britain | 6 | 1 | 1 | 13.38 s | Q | |
| 3 | Mark Crear | United States | 1 | 2 | 1 | 13.44 s | Q | |
| 4 | Allen Johnson | United States | 5 | 3 | 1 | 13.50 s | Q | |
| 5 | Shaun Bownes | South Africa | 2 | 3 | 2 | 13.53 s | Q | |
| 5 | Yoel Hernández | Cuba | 2 | 1 | 2 | 13.53 s | Q | |
| 5 | Tomasz Ścigaczewski | Poland | 6 | 7 | 2 | 13.53 s | Q | |
| 8 | Florian Schwarthoff | Germany | 4 | 6 | 1 | 13.55 s | Q | |
| 9 | Staņislavs Olijars | Latvia | 1 | 1 | 2 | 13.56 s | Q | |
| 9 | Evgeny Pechenkin | Russia | 5 | 7 | 2 | 13.56 s | Q | |
| 11 | Jonathan Nsenga | Belgium | 5 | 6 | 3 | 13.57 s | Q | |
| 12 | Robert Kronberg | Sweden | 4 | 4 | 2 | 13.58 s | Q | |
| 13 | Terrence Trammell | United States | 4 | 1 | 3 | 13.59 s | Q | |
| 14 | Anier García | Cuba | 3 | 8 | 1 | 13.60 s | Q | |
| 15 | Andrea Giaconi | Italy | 6 | 5 | 3 | 13.62 s | Q | |
| 16 | Elmar Lichtenegger | Austria | 5 | 2 | 4 | 13.65 s | Q | |
| 16 | Emiliano Pizzoli | Italy | 4 | 8 | 4 | 13.65 s | Q | |
| 18 | Levente Csillag | Hungary | 5 | 8 | 5 | 13.66 s | q | |
| 19 | Falk Balzer | Germany | 2 | 8 | 4 | 13.67 s | Q | |
| 19 | Kyle Vander-Kuyp | Australia | 1 | 8 | 3 | 13.67 s | Q | |
| 21 | Marcio Simao de Souza | Brazil | 4 | 3 | 5 | 13.70 s | q | |
| 22 | Adrian Woodley | Canada | 6 | 2 | 4 | 13.71 s | Q | |
| 23 | Satoru Tanigawa | Japan | 6 | 3 | 5 | 13.74 s | q | |
| 24 | Andrey Kislykh | Russia | 3 | 4 | 2 | 13.77 s | Q | |
| 25 | Balázs Kovács | Hungary | 3 | 5 | 3 | 13.83 s | Q | |
| 26 | Joseph-Berlioz Randriamihaja | Madagascar | 5 | 5 | 6 | 13.86 s | q | |
| 27 | Steve Brown | Trinidad and Tobago | 2 | 5 | 5 | 13.92 s | q | |
| 28 | Jean-Marc Grava | France | 3 | 6 | 4 | 14.01 s | Q | |
| 28 | Damien Greaves | Great Britain | 5 | 4 | 7 | 14.01 s | q | |
| 30 | Peter Coghlan | Ireland | 2 | 7 | 6 | 14.03 s | q | |
| 31 | Jeff Jackson | Virgin Islands | 4 | 7 | 6 | 14.05 s | q | |
| 32 | Victor Houston | Barbados | 4 | 5 | 7 | 14.06 s | | |
| 33 | Paolo Della Santa | Switzerland | 4 | 2 | 8 | 14.12 s | | |
| 34 | Paul Sehzue | Liberia | 1 | 5 | 4 | 14.18 s | Q | |
| 35 | Charles Tyrone Allen | Guyana | 1 | 4 | 5 | 14.21 s | | |
| 36 | Gabriel Burnett | Barbados | 3 | 3 | 5 | 14.23 s | | |
| 37 | Robert Foster | Jamaica | 2 | 2 | 7 | 14.33 s | | |
| 38 | Raphael Monachon | Switzerland | 3 | 2 | 6 | 14.80 s | | |
| 39 | Arlindo Pinheiro | São Tomé and Príncipe | 6 | 4 | 6 | 15.65 s | | NR |
| 40 | Ralf Leberer | Germany | 1 | 6 | 6 | 56.74 s | q | |
| | Tony Jarrett | Great Britain | 1 | 7 | | DQ | | |
| | Mubarak Mubarak | Saudi Arabia | 2 | 6 | | DQ | | |
| | Marcin Kuśzewski | Poland | 1 | 3 | | DNF | | |
| | Zhivko Videnov | Bulgaria | 3 | 7 | | DNF | | |
| | Robin Korving | Netherlands | 1 | 3 | | DNS | | |
| | Igor Kováč | Slovakia | 6 | 8 | | DNS | | |

=== Quarterfinals ===
==== Quarterfinal 1 ====
| Rank | Lane | Athlete | Nation | Reaction | Time | Notes |
|---|---|---|---|---|---|---|
| 1 | 3 | Anier García | Cuba | 0.207 | 13.53 | Q |
| 2 | 7 | Falk Balzer | Germany | 0.206 | 13.59 | Q |
| 3 | 4 | Mark Crear | United States | 0.144 | 13.60 | Q |
| 4 | 6 | Evgeny Pechenkin | Russia | 0.155 | 13.69 | Q |
| 5 | 8 | Emiliano Pizzoli | Italy | 0.153 | 13.69 | |
| 6 | 5 | Jonathan Nsenga | Belgium | 0.152 | 13.73 | |
| 7 | 1 | Satoru Tanigawa | Japan | 0.157 | 13.94 | |
| 8 | 2 | Damien Greaves | Great Britain | 0.239 | 14.08 | |
| | | | | Wind: +0.3 m/s | | |

==== Quarterfinal 2 ====
| Rank | Lane | Athlete | Nation | Reaction | Time | Notes |
|---|---|---|---|---|---|---|
| 1 | 4 | Dudley Dorival | Haiti | 0.180 | 13.49 | Q |
| 2 | 5 | Shaun Bownes | South Africa | 0.203 | 13.54 | Q |
| 3 | 3 | Tomasz Ścigaczewski | Poland | 0.210 | 13.60 | Q |
| 4 | 8 | Kyle Vander-Kuyp | Australia | 0.163 | 13.62 | Q |
| 5 | 9 | Ralf Leberer | Germany | 0.141 | 13.73 | |
| 6 | 7 | Levente Csillag | Hungary | 0.183 | 13.75 | |
| 7 | 6 | Andrea Giaconi | Italy | 0.168 | 13.93 | |
| 8 | 1 | Jeff Jackson | Virgin Islands | 0.248 | 14.17 | |
| 9 | 2 | Paul Sehzue | Liberia | 0.220 | 14.37 | |
| | | | | Wind: +0.5 m/s | | |

==== Quarterfinal 3 ====
| Rank | Lane | Athlete | Nation | Reaction | Time | Notes |
|---|---|---|---|---|---|---|
| 1 | 3 | Florian Schwarthoff | Germany | 0.190 | 13.54 | Q |
| 2 | 5 | Allen Johnson | United States | 0.154 | 13.55 | Q |
| 3 | 6 | Robert Kronberg | Sweden | 0.205 | 13.56 | Q |
| 4 | 8 | Elmar Lichtenegger | Austria | 0.196 | 13.73 | Q |
| 5 | 4 | Andrey Kislykh | Russia | 0.154 | 14.03 | |
| 6 | 1 | Adrian Woodley | Canada | 0.178 | 14.04 | |
| 7 | 7 | Joseph-Berlioz Randriamihaja | Madagascar | 0.233 | 14.07 | |
| 8 | 2 | Steve Brown | Trinidad and Tobago | 0.202 | 14.12 | |
| | | | | Wind: -0.6 m/s | | |

==== Quarterfinal 4 ====
| Rank | Lane | Athlete | Nation | Reaction | Time | Notes |
|---|---|---|---|---|---|---|
| 1 | 4 | Colin Jackson | Great Britain | 0.136 | 13.27 | Q |
| 2 | 6 | Terrence Trammell | United States | 0.154 | 13.29 | Q |
| 3 | 3 | Staņislavs Olijars | Latvia | 0.164 | 13.34 | Q |
| 4 | 5 | Yoel Hernández | Cuba | 0.176 | 13.40 | Q |
| 5 | 1 | Marcio Simao de Souza | Brazil | 0.154 | 13.71 | |
| 6 | 2 | Balázs Kovács | Hungary | 0.155 | 13.78 | |
| 7 | 7 | Peter Coghlan | Ireland | 0.182 | 13.86 | SB |
| 8 | 8 | Jean-Marc Grava | France | 0.152 | 14.47 | |
| | | | | Wind: +0.3 m/s | | |

==== Overall results for quarterfinals ====
| Rank | Athlete | Nation | Heat | Lane | Place | Time | Qual. | Record |
|---|---|---|---|---|---|---|---|---|
| 1 | Colin Jackson | Great Britain | 4 | 4 | 1 | 13.27 s | Q | |
| 2 | Terrence Trammell | United States | 4 | 6 | 2 | 13.29 s | Q | |
| 3 | Staņislavs Olijars | Latvia | 4 | 3 | 3 | 13.34 s | Q | |
| 4 | Yoel Hernández | Cuba | 4 | 5 | 4 | 13.40 s | Q | |
| 5 | Dudley Dorival | Haiti | 2 | 4 | 1 | 13.49 s | Q | |
| 6 | Anier García | Cuba | 1 | 3 | 1 | 13.53 s | Q | |
| 7 | Shaun Bownes | South Africa | 2 | 5 | 2 | 13.54 s | Q | |
| 7 | Florian Schwarthoff | Germany | 3 | 3 | 1 | 13.54 s | Q | |
| 9 | Allen Johnson | United States | 3 | 5 | 2 | 13.55 s | Q | |
| 10 | Robert Kronberg | Sweden | 3 | 6 | 3 | 13.56 s | Q | |
| 11 | Falk Balzer | Germany | 1 | 7 | 2 | 13.59 s | Q | |
| 12 | Mark Crear | United States | 1 | 4 | 3 | 13.60 s | Q | |
| 12 | Tomasz Ścigaczewski | Poland | 2 | 3 | 3 | 13.60 s | Q | |
| 14 | Kyle Vander-Kuyp | Australia | 2 | 8 | 4 | 13.62 s | Q | |
| 15 | Evgeny Pechenkin | Russia | 1 | 6 | 4 | 13.63 s | Q | |
| 16 | Emiliano Pizzoli | Italy | 1 | 8 | 5 | 13.69 s | | |
| 17 | Marcio Simao de Souza | Brazil | 4 | 1 | 5 | 13.71 s | | |
| 18 | Elmar Lichtenegger | Austria | 3 | 8 | 4 | 13.73 s | Q | |
| 18 | Ralf Leberer | Germany | 2 | 9 | 5 | 13.73 s | | |
| 18 | Jonathan Nsenga | Belgium | 1 | 5 | 6 | 13.73 s | | |
| 21 | Levente Csillag | Hungary | 2 | 7 | 6 | 13.75 s | | |
| 22 | Balázs Kovács | Hungary | 4 | 2 | 6 | 13.78 s | | |
| 23 | Peter Coghlan | Ireland | 4 | 7 | 7 | 13.86 s | | SB |
| 24 | Andrea Giaconi | Italy | 2 | 6 | 7 | 13.93 s | | |
| 25 | Satoru Tanigawa | Japan | 1 | 1 | 7 | 13.94 s | | |
| 26 | Andrey Kislykh | Russia | 3 | 4 | 5 | 14.03 s | | |
| 27 | Adrian Woodley | Canada | 3 | 1 | 6 | 14.04 s | | |
| 28 | Joseph-Berlioz Randriamihaja | Madagascar | 3 | 7 | 7 | 14.07 s | | |
| 29 | Damien Greaves | Great Britain | 1 | 2 | 8 | 14.08 s | | |
| 30 | Steve Brown | Trinidad and Tobago | 3 | 2 | 8 | 14.12 s | | |
| 31 | Jeff Jackson | Virgin Islands | 2 | 1 | 8 | 14.17 s | | |
| 32 | Paul Sehzue | Liberia | 2 | 2 | 9 | 14.37 s | | |
| 33 | Jean-Marc Grava | France | 4 | 8 | 8 | 14.47 s | | |

=== Semifinals ===
==== Semifinal 1 ====
| Rank | Lane | Athlete | Nation | Reaction | Time | Notes |
|---|---|---|---|---|---|---|
| 1 | 5 | Anier García | Cuba | 0.174 | 13.16 | Q |
| 2 | 2 | Mark Crear | United States | 0.193 | 13.23 | Q |
| 3 | 3 | Dudley Dorival | Haiti | 0.168 | 13.35 | Q |
| 4 | 8 | Robert Kronberg | Sweden | 0.154 | 13.39 | Q |
| 5 | 4 | Shaun Bownes | South Africa | 0.167 | 13.41 | SB |
| 6 | 6 | Falk Balzer | Germany | 0.176 | 13.59 | |
| 7 | 1 | Evgeny Pechenkin | Russia | 0.165 | 13.62 | |
| 8 | 7 | Kyle Vander-Kuyp | Australia | 0.140 | 13.63 | |
| | | | | Wind: +0.4 m/s | | |

==== Semifinal 2 ====
| Rank | Lane | Athlete | Nation | Reaction | Time | Notes |
|---|---|---|---|---|---|---|
| 1 | 4 | Terrence Trammell | United States | 0.200 | 13.32 | Q |
| 2 | 3 | Allen Johnson | United States | 0.166 | 13.34 | Q |
| 3 | 6 | Colin Jackson | Great Britain | 0.144 | 13.34 | Q |
| 4 | 5 | Florian Schwarthoff | Germany | 0.125 | 13.39 | Q |
| 5 | 7 | Yoel Hernández | Cuba | 0.168 | 13.41 | |
| 6 | 2 | Staņislavs Olijars | Latvia | 0.166 | 13.50 | |
| 7 | 8 | Tomasz Ścigaczewski | Poland | 0.159 | 13.51 | |
| 8 | 1 | Elmar Lichtenegger | Austria | 0.193 | 13.59 | |
| | | | | Wind: +0.1 m/s | | |

==== Overall results for semifinals ====
| Rank | Athlete | Nation | Heat | Lane | Place | Time | Qual. | Record |
|---|---|---|---|---|---|---|---|---|
| 1 | Anier García | Cuba | 1 | 5 | 1 | 13.16 s | Q | |
| 2 | Mark Crear | United States | 1 | 2 | 2 | 13.23 s | Q | |
| 3 | Terrence Trammell | United States | 2 | 4 | 1 | 13.32 s | Q | |
| 4 | Allen Johnson | United States | 2 | 3 | 2 | 13.33 s | Q | |
| 5 | Colin Jackson | Great Britain | 2 | 6 | 3 | 13.34 s | Q | |
| 6 | Dudley Dorival | Haiti | 1 | 3 | 3 | 13.35 s | Q | |
| 7 | Robert Kronberg | Sweden | 1 | 8 | 4 | 13.39 s | Q | |
| 7 | Florian Schwarthoff | Germany | 2 | 5 | 4 | 13.39 s | Q | |
| 9 | Shaun Bownes | South Africa | 1 | 4 | 5 | 13.41 s | | SB |
| 9 | Yoel Hernández | Cuba | 2 | 7 | 5 | 13.41 s | | |
| 11 | Staņislavs Olijars | Latvia | 2 | 2 | 6 | 13.50 s | | |
| 12 | Tomasz Ścigaczewski | Poland | 2 | 8 | 7 | 13.51 s | | |
| 13 | Falk Balzer | Germany | 1 | 6 | 6 | 13.59 s | | |
| 13 | Elmar Lichtenegger | Austria | 2 | 1 | 8 | 13.59 s | | |
| 15 | Evgeny Pechenkin | Russia | 1 | 1 | 7 | 13.62 s | | |
| 16 | Kyle Vander-Kuyp | Australia | 1 | 7 | 8 | 13.63 s | | |

=== Final ===
| Rank | Lane | Athlete | Nation | Reaction | Time | Notes |
|---|---|---|---|---|---|---|
| 1st place, gold medalist(s) | 3 | Anier García | Cuba | 0.172 | 13.00 | NR |
| 2nd place, silver medalist(s) | 4 | Terrence Trammell | United States | 0.221 | 13.16 | PB |
| 3rd place, bronze medalist(s) | 6 | Mark Crear | United States | 0.214 | 13.22 | |
| 4 | 5 | Allen Johnson | United States | 0.182 | 13.23 | |
| 5 | 1 | Colin Jackson | Great Britain | 0.139 | 13.28 | |
| 6 | 7 | Florian Schwarthoff | Germany | 0.184 | 13.42 | |
| 7 | 2 | Dudley Dorival | Haiti | 0.161 | 13.49 | |
| 8 | 8 | Robert Kronberg | Sweden | 0.244 | 13.61 | |
| | | | | Wind: +0.6 m/s | | |
