= 2000 European Athletics Indoor Championships – Men's 60 metres hurdles =

The men's 60 metres hurdles event at the 2000 European Athletics Indoor Championships was held on February 25–26.

== Medalists ==
Gold	Silver	Bronze
Staņislavs Olijars; Latvia	Tony Jarrett; Great Britain	Tomasz Ścigaczewski; Poland

== Results ==
=== Heats ===
First 2 of each heat (Q) and the next 8 fastest (q) qualified for the semifinals.

Rank	Heat	Name	Nationality	Time	Notes
1	4	Andrey Kislykh	Russia	7.57	Q, PB
2	3	Ralf Leberer	Germany	7.59	Q, PB
3	3	Tomasz Ścigaczewski	Poland	7.62	Q
4	3	Jonathan N'Senga	Belgium	7.62	q, SB
5	1	Elmar Lichtenegger	Austria	7.63	Q
6	4	Yivko Videnov	Bulgaria	7.64	Q
7	2	Staņislavs Olijars	Latvia	7.65	Q
8	4	Falk Balzer	Germany	7.66	q
9	4	Tony Jarrett	Great Britain	7.68	q
10	1	Robert Kronberg	Sweden	7.71	Q
11	1	Igor Kováč	Slovakia	7.74	q
12	1	Vincent Clarico	France	7.76	q
12	4	Emiliano Pizzoli	Italy	7.76	q
14	2	Damian Greaves	Great Britain	7.77	Q
15	2	Philippe Lamine	France	7.79	q
16	2	Andrea Giaconi	Italy	7.81	q
17	2	Ivo Burkhardt	Germany	7.82	
17	3	Sebastien Denis	France	7.82	
19	1	Balázs Kovács	Hungary	7.83	
19	3	Damjan Zlatnar	Slovenia	7.83	
21	2	Levente Csillag	Hungary	7.91	
21	4	Piet Deveughele	Belgium	7.91	
21	4	Leonard Hudec	Austria	7.91	
24	1	Stefanos Ioannou	Cyprus	8.08	
24	2	Tarmo Jallai	Estonia	8.08	
26	1	Sergi Raya	Andorra	8.46	
	1	Mauro Rossi	Italy	DQ	
	3	Robin Korving	Netherlands	DNS	
	3	Igors Kazanovs	Latvia	DNS	

=== Semifinals ===
First 4 of each semifinals qualified directly (Q) for the final.

Rank	Heat	Name	Nationality	Time	Notes
1	2	Tomasz Ścigaczewski	Poland	7.57	Q
2	1	Robert Kronberg	Sweden	7.59	Q, NR
3	1	Elmar Lichtenegger	Austria	7.59	Q
4	1	Ralf Leberer	Germany	7.60	Q
4	2	Staņislavs Olijars	Latvia	7.60	Q
6	1	Tony Jarrett	Great Britain	7.61	Q
7	2	Jonathan N'Senga	Belgium	7.64	Q
8	2	Falk Balzer	Germany	7.65	Q
9	2	Damian Greaves	Great Britain	7.68	PB
10	1	Yivko Videnov	Bulgaria	7.70	
10	2	Andrey Kislykh	Russia	7.70	
12	1	Emiliano Pizzoli	Italy	7.71	
13	2	Andrea Giaconi	Italy	7.77	
14	1	Igor Kováč	Slovakia	7.80	
15	2	Philippe Lamine	France	7.89	
	1	Vincent Clarico	France	DNS	

=== Final ===
Rank	Name	Nationality	Reaction	Time	Notes
1st place, gold medalist(s)	Staņislavs Olijars	Latvia	0.144	7.50	PB
2nd place, silver medalist(s)	Tony Jarrett	Great Britain	0.132	7.53	SB
3rd place, bronze medalist(s)	Tomasz Ścigaczewski	Poland	0.126	7.56	
4	Elmar Lichtenegger	Austria	0.145	7.56	SB
5	Falk Balzer	Germany	0.153	7.63	
6	Robert Kronberg	Sweden	0.133	7.64	
7	Jonathan N'Senga	Belgium	0.127	7.71	
8	Ralf Leberer	Germany	0.119	7.74	
