= 2002 European Athletics Indoor Championships – Men's 60 metres hurdles =

The men's 60 metres hurdles event at the 2002 European Athletics Indoor Championships was held on March 1–2.

== Medalists ==
Gold	Silver	Bronze
Colin Jackson; Great Britain	Elmar Lichtenegger; Austria	Staņislavs Olijars; Latvia

Note: Evgeny Pechonkin of Russia had originally won the bronze but was later disqualified for doping.

== Results ==
=== Heats ===
First 2 of each heat (Q) and the next 6 fastest (q) qualified for the semifinals.

Rank	Heat	Name	Nationality	Time	Notes
1	4	Colin Jackson	Great Britain	7.55	Q
2	1	Staņislavs Olijars	Latvia	7.61	Q
3	2	Elmar Lichtenegger	Austria	7.66	Q
4	2	Florian Schwarthoff	Germany	7.66	Q
5	3	Mike Fenner	Germany	7.69	Q
5	4	Robert Kronberg	Sweden	7.69	Q
7	1	Krzysztof Mehlich	Poland	7.71	Q
8	1	Peter Coghlan	Ireland	7.72	q
8	4	Marcel van der Westen	Netherlands	7.72	q
10	5	Miroslav Novaković	Yugoslavia	7.73	Q, NR
11	5	Ladji Doucouré	France	7.76	q
12	1	Vincent Clarico	France	7.77	q, SB
13	2	Gregory Sedoc	Netherlands	7.78	q
13	3	Ivan Bitzi	Switzerland	7.78	Q
13	5	Raphael Monachon	Switzerland	7.78	q
16	5	Jan Schindzielorz	Germany	7.81	
17	3	Damien Greaves	Great Britain	7.82	
18	1	Daniel Kiss	Hungary	7.83	PB
18	3	Stefanos Ioannou	Cyprus	7.83	NR
20	4	Leonard Hudec	Austria	7.85	
21	2	Rui Palma	Portugal	7.87	
22	5	Jurica Grabušić	Croatia	7.88	NR
23	1	Virgil Spier	Netherlands	7.89	
23	2	Balázs Kovács	Hungary	7.89	
25	3	Gergely Palagyi	Hungary	7.91	
26	4	Zhivko Videnov	Bulgaria	7.93	
27	3	Ladislav Burdel	Czech Republic	7.97	
28	4	Sergo Turiatko	Georgia	8.34	
29	5	Sergi Raya	Andorra	8.49	
30	1	Elton Bitincka	Albania	8.73	
	2	Sebastien Denis	France	DQ	
	5	Evgeny Pechonkin	Russia	DQ	

=== Semifinals ===
First 4 of each semifinals qualified directly (Q) for the final.

Rank	Heat	Name	Nationality	Time	Notes
1	2	Elmar Lichtenegger	Austria	7.45	Q, NR
2	1	Colin Jackson	Great Britain	7.55	Q
3	2	Florian Schwarthoff	Germany	7.56	Q, SB
4	2	Staņislavs Olijars	Latvia	7.57	Q
5	1	Mike Fenner	Germany	7.62	Q
6	1	Peter Coghlan	Ireland	7.66	Q
7	2	Robert Kronberg	Sweden	7.67	Q
8	1	Krzysztof Mehlich	Poland	7.71	
9	1	Ladji Doucouré	France	7.73	
10	1	Ivan Bitzi	Switzerland	7.75	
11	2	Miroslav Novaković	Yugoslavia	7.80	
12	2	Marcel van der Westen	Netherlands	7.85	
13	2	Vincent Clarico	France	7.85	
14	2	Raphael Monachon	Switzerland	7.86	
15	1	Gregory Sedoc	Netherlands	7.99	
	1	Evgeny Pechonkin	Russia	DQ	

=== Final ===
Rank	Lane	Name	Nationality	Time	Notes
1st place, gold medalist(s)	6	Colin Jackson	Great Britain	7.40	SB, FS1
2nd place, silver medalist(s)	5	Elmar Lichtenegger	Austria	7.44	NR
3rd place, bronze medalist(s)	2	Staņislavs Olijars	Latvia	7.51	FS1
4	3	Florian Schwarthoff	Germany	7.59	
5	1	Robert Kronberg	Sweden	7.67	
6	7	Peter Coghlan	Ireland	7.67	
7	4	Mike Fenner	Germany	7.70	
	8	Evgeny Pechonkin	Russia	DQ	
