= Athletics at the 1999 Summer Universiade – Men's 110 metres hurdles =

The men's 110 metres hurdles event at the 1999 Summer Universiade was held at the Estadio Son Moix in Palma de Mallorca, Spain on 8 and 9 July.

== Medalists ==
Gold	Silver	Bronze
Terrence Trammell; United States	Jonathan Nsenga; Belgium	Dawane Wallace; United States

== Results ==
=== Heats ===
Wind:
Heat 1: +2.5 m/s, Heat 2: +2.5 m/s, Heat 3: +1.5 m/s, Heat 4: +1.5 m/s, Heat 5: +3.2 m/s

Rank	Heat	Athlete	Nationality	Time	Notes
1	2	Peter Coghlan	Ireland	13.45	Q
2	1	Jonathan Nsenga	Belgium	13.46	Q
3	2	Robert Kronberg	Sweden	13.60	Q
4	4	Terrence Trammell	United States	13.61	Q
5	2	Andrea Giaconi	Italy	13.62	Q
6	3	Ralf Leberer	Germany	13.63	Q
7	1	William Erese	Nigeria	13.66	Q
8	5	Dawane Wallace	United States	13.68	Q
9	1	Satoru Tanigawa	Japan	13.77	Q
10	5	Emerson Perín	Brazil	13.80	Q
11	3	Márcio de Souza	Brazil	13.81	Q
12	2	Leonard Hudec	Austria	13.84	Q
13	5	Sergey Manakov	Russia	13.90	Q
14	1	Andrey Kislykh	Russia	13.92	Q
14	3	Rui Palma	Portugal	13.92	Q
14	3	Miguel de los Santos	Spain	13.92	Q
17	4	Philippe Lamine	France	13.95	Q
18	4	Gabriel Burnett	Barbados	13.99	Q
19	4	Félou Doudou Sow	Senegal	14.00	Q
20	3	Kenneth Halhjem	Norway	14.02	q
21	4	Blaz Korent	Slovenia	14.07	q
22	5	Tim Ewen	Australia	14.11	Q
23	2	Zhen Qi	China	14.13	q
24	1	Raphael Monachon	Switzerland	14.19	q
25	5	Paulo Villar	Colombia	14.20	
26	1	Zoran Miljuš	Croatia	14.21	
27	1	Henrik Ögren	Sweden	14.23	
28	5	José Carmona	Puerto Rico	14.36	
29	3	Anders Sækmose	Denmark	14.45	
30	1	Carlos Correa	Chile	14.85	
31	5	Liam Whaley	New Zealand	15.22	
32	4	Bo Saaek	Denmark	15.26	
33	4	Chan Ming Sang	Hong Kong	15.61	
34	5	Damjan Zlatnar	Slovenia	15.91	
35	2	Mihai Marghescu	Romania	16.19	
36	3	Zaman Amm Zaman	Bangladesh	17.21	
	2	Carlos Vega	Chile	DNS	

=== Semifinals ===
Wind:
Heat 1: -1.2 m/s, Heat 2: -2.1 m/s, Heat 3: -2.1 m/s

Rank	Heat	Athlete	Nationality	Time	Notes
1	3	Terrence Trammell	United States	13.56	Q
2	3	Ralf Leberer	Germany	13.61	Q, SB
3	2	Peter Coghlan	Ireland	13.68	Q
4	1	Jonathan Nsenga	Belgium	13.77	Q
4	2	Robert Kronberg	Sweden	13.77	Q
4	3	Márcio de Souza	Brazil	13.77	q
7	1	Dawane Wallace	United States	13.82	Q
8	2	William Erese	Nigeria	13.93	q
9	1	Andrea Giaconi	Italy	13.94	
10	1	Andrey Kislykh	Russia	13.96	
10	2	Sergey Manakov	Russia	13.96	
12	1	Emerson Perín	Brazil	14.03	
13	2	Miguel de los Santos	Spain	14.08	
14	2	Satoru Tanigawa	Japan	14.12	
15	3	Philippe Lamine	France	14.13	
16	2	Raphael Monachon	Switzerland	14.14	
17	3	Gabriel Burnett	Barbados	14.15	
18	3	Kenneth Halhjem	Norway	14.18	
19	1	Tim Ewen	Australia	14.24	
20	1	Rui Palma	Portugal	14.29	
21	2	Félou Doudou Sow	Senegal	14.39	
22	1	Zhen Qi	China	14.40	
23	3	Blaz Korent	Slovenia	14.44	
	3	Leonard Hudec	Austria	DQ	

=== Final ===
Wind: -0.1 m/s

Rank	Athlete	Nationality	Time	Notes
1st place, gold medalist(s)	Terrence Trammell	United States	13.44	
2nd place, silver medalist(s)	Jonathan Nsenga	Belgium	13.51	
3rd place, bronze medalist(s)	Dawane Wallace	United States	13.59	
4	Peter Coghlan	Ireland	13.63	
5	William Erese	Nigeria	13.74	
6	Robert Kronberg	Sweden	13.80	
7	Márcio de Souza	Brazil	14.04	
	Ralf Leberer	Germany	DQ	
