= 2001 IAAF World Indoor Championships – Men's 60 metres hurdles =

The men's 60 metres hurdles event at the 2001 IAAF World Indoor Championships was held on March 9.

== Medalists ==
Gold	Silver	Bronze
Terrence Trammell; United States	Anier García; Cuba	Shaun Bownes; South Africa

== Results ==
=== Heats ===
First 4 of each heat (Q) and next 4 fastest (q) qualified for the semifinals.

Rank	Heat	Name	Nationality	Time	Notes
1	3	Terrence Trammell	United States	7.56	Q
2	3	Elmar Lichtenegger	Austria	7.61	Q
3	2	Shaun Bownes	South Africa	7.62	Q
4	1	Staņislavs Olijars	Latvia	7.63	Q
5	2	Robert Kronberg	Sweden	7.67	Q
6	1	Dudley Dorival	Haiti	7.68	Q
7	1	Yoel Hernández	Cuba	7.70	Q
8	1	Maurice Wignall	Jamaica	7.73	Q
8	3	Peter Coghlan	Ireland	7.73	Q
10	2	Anier García	Cuba	7.74	Q
11	2	Hipolito Montesinos	Spain	7.75	Q
12	2	Zhivko Videnov	Bulgaria	7.75	q
13	3	Yevgeniy Pechonkin	Russia	7.76	Q
14	1	Leonard Hudec	Austria	7.79	q
15	1	Andrea Putignani	Italy	7.80	q
15	3	Emiliano Pizzoli	Italy	7.80	q
17	3	Adrian Woodley	Canada	7.84	
18	3	Balázs Kovács	Hungary	7.86	
19	2	Wagner Marseille	Haiti	7.90	
20	1	David Ilariani	Georgia	8.23	
21	1	Sergi Raya	Andorra	8.45	
22	3	Baymurat Ashirmuradov	Turkmenistan	8.50	
23	2	José Calixto Sierra	Honduras	10.38	
	2	Rui Palma	Portugal	DNF	

=== Semifinals ===
First 4 of each semifinal (Q) qualified directly for the final.

Rank	Heat	Name	Nationality	Time	Notes
1	2	Robert Kronberg	Sweden	7.54	Q, NR
2	2	Terrence Trammell	United States	7.54	Q
3	1	Staņislavs Olijars	Latvia	7.55	Q, SB
4	2	Anier García	Cuba	7.56	Q, SB
5	1	Yoel Hernández	Cuba	7.59	Q
6	2	Elmar Lichtenegger	Austria	7.63	Q
7	2	Yevgeniy Pechonkin	Russia	7.63	
8	1	Dudley Dorival	Haiti	7.64	Q, SB
9	1	Shaun Bownes	South Africa	7.65	Q
10	2	Peter Coghlan	Ireland	7.67	SB
11	1	Hipolito Montesinos	Spain	7.71	
12	2	Zhivko Videnov	Bulgaria	7.77	
13	1	Emiliano Pizzoli	Italy	7.78	
14	1	Leonard Hudec	Austria	7.78	
15	1	Maurice Wignall	Jamaica	7.81	
16	2	Andrea Putignani	Italy	7.92	

=== Final ===
Rank	Name	Nationality	Time	Notes
1st place, gold medalist(s)	Terrence Trammell	United States	7.51	
2nd place, silver medalist(s)	Anier García	Cuba	7.54	SB
3rd place, bronze medalist(s)	Shaun Bownes	South Africa	7.55	
4	Robert Kronberg	Sweden	7.57	
5	Yoel Hernández	Cuba	7.58	SB
6	Elmar Lichtenegger	Austria	7.65	
7	Dudley Dorival	Haiti	7.73	
8	Staņislavs Olijars	Latvia	12.77	
