= 1996 World Junior Championships in Athletics – Men's 110 metres hurdles =

The men's 110 metres hurdles event at the 1996 World Junior Championships in Athletics was held in Sydney, Australia, at International Athletic Centre on 23, 24 and 25 August. 106.7 cm (3'6) (senior implement) hurdles were used.

== Medalists ==
Gold	Yoel Hernández; Cuba
Silver	Tomasz Ścigaczewski; Poland
Bronze	Jovesa Naivalu; Fiji

== Results ==
=== Final ===
25 August
Wind: +1.8 m/s

Rank	Name	Nationality	Time	Notes
1st place, gold medalist(s)	Yoel Hernández	Cuba	13.83	
2nd place, silver medalist(s)	Tomasz Ścigaczewski	Poland	13.88	
3rd place, bronze medalist(s)	Jovesa Naivalu	Fiji	13.91	
4	Ross Baillie	United Kingdom	14.01	
5	Damien Greaves	United Kingdom	14.04	
6	David Janin	France	14.04	
7	John McAfee	United States	14.22	
8	Zhivko Videnov	Bulgaria	32.79	
	Ivo Burkhardt	Germany	DQ	IAAF rule 168.7

=== Semifinals ===
24 August

==== Semifinal 1 ====
Wind: +0.3 m/s

Rank	Name	Nationality	Time	Notes
1	Ross Baillie	United Kingdom	14.12	Q
2	Tomasz Ścigaczewski	Poland	14.22	Q
3	David Janin	France	14.27	q
4	Andrey Vinnitskiy	Ukraine	14.42	
5	Attila Kilvinger	Hungary	14.43	
6	Daniel Carrillo	Spain	14.49	
7	Jason Waters	United States	14.76	
8	Konstantin Bagmetov	Kazakhstan	14.89	

==== Semifinal 2 ====
Wind: -1.1 m/s

Rank	Name	Nationality	Time	Notes
1	Yoel Hernández	Cuba	13.81	Q
2	Ivo Burkhardt	Germany	14.05	Q
3	Damien Greaves	United Kingdom	14.22	q
4	Marcin Kuśzewski	Poland	14.32	
5	Tim Ewen	Australia	14.53	
6	Balázs Kovács	Hungary	14.61	
7	Igor Yastrebov	Russia	14.64	
8	Chang Fu-sheng	Chinese Taipei	15.04	

==== Semifinal 3 ====
Wind: -1.5 m/s

Rank	Name	Nationality	Time	Notes
1	Zhivko Videnov	Bulgaria	14.24	Q
2	John McAfee	United States	14.24	Q
3	Jovesa Naivalu	Fiji	14.27	q
4	Khassif Mubarak	Qatar	14.37	
5	Stephen Jones	Barbados	14.37	
6	Carlos Patterson	Cuba	14.37	
7	Djeke Mambo	Zaire	14.63	
8	Staņislavs Olijars	Latvia	14.76	

=== Heats ===
23 August

==== Heat 1 ====
Wind: +0.9 m/s

Rank	Name	Nationality	Time	Notes
1	Yoel Hernández	Cuba	13.95	Q
2	Ross Baillie	United Kingdom	14.30	Q
3	Daniel Carrillo	Spain	14.31	Q
4	Andrey Vinnitskiy	Ukraine	14.41	Q
5	Djeke Mambo	Zaire	14.66	q
6	Nikólaos Avramidis	Greece	14.96	
7	Andrey Korniyenko	Kyrgyzstan	15.27	

==== Heat 2 ====
Wind: -0.6 m/s

Rank	Name	Nationality	Time	Notes
1	Stephen Jones	Barbados	14.06	Q
2	Khassif Mubarak	Qatar	14.32	Q
3	Attila Kilvinger	Hungary	14.35	Q
4	Zhivko Videnov	Bulgaria	14.39	Q
5	Jason Waters	United States	14.41	q
6	Frank Peeters	Netherlands	15.15	
7	Crespin Adanguidi	Benin	15.80	

==== Heat 3 ====
Wind: +1.1 m/s

Rank	Name	Nationality	Time	Notes
1	Jovesa Naivalu	Fiji	14.12	Q
2	Damien Greaves	United Kingdom	14.17	Q
3	Tim Ewen	Australia	14.33	Q
4	Balázs Kovács	Hungary	14.55	Q
5	Staņislavs Olijars	Latvia	14.67	q
6	Jens Wallin	Finland	15.10	
	Jerome Crews	Germany	DQ	IAAF rule 162.7

==== Heat 4 ====
Wind: -0.6 m/s

Rank	Name	Nationality	Time	Notes
1	Tomasz Ścigaczewski	Poland	14.04	Q
2	Carlos Patterson	Cuba	14.37	Q
3	John McAfee	United States	14.51	Q
4	Chang Fu-sheng	Chinese Taipei	14.61	Q
5	Gareth Watkins	Australia	14.89	
6	Henrik Ögren	Sweden	14.94	
7	Rodrigo Palladino	Brazil	15.05	

==== Heat 5 ====
Wind: +0.2 m/s

Rank	Name	Nationality	Time	Notes
1	David Janin	France	14.12	Q
2	Ivo Burkhardt	Germany	14.16	Q
3	Marcin Kuśzewski	Poland	14.17	Q
4	Konstantin Bagmetov	Kazakhstan	14.66	Q
5	Igor Yastrebov	Russia	14.71	q
6	Chen Chih-Wei	Chinese Taipei	15.17	

== Participation ==
According to an unofficial count, 34 athletes from 26 countries participated in the event.

- Australia (2)
- Barbados (1)
- Benin (1)
- Brazil (1)
- Bulgaria (1)
- Chinese Taipei (2)
- Cuba (2)
- Fiji (1)
- Finland (1)
- France (1)
- Germany (2)
- Greece (1)
- Hungary (2)
- Kazakhstan (1)
- Kyrgyzstan (1)
- Latvia (1)
- Netherlands (1)
- Poland (2)
- Qatar (1)
- Russia (1)
- Spain (1)
- Sweden (1)
- Ukraine (1)
- United Kingdom (2)
- United States (2)
- Zaire (1)
