= 1999 European Athletics U23 Championships – Men's 110 metres hurdles =

The men's 110 metres hurdles event at the 1999 European Athletics U23 Championships was held in Gothenburg, Sweden, at Ullevi on 31 July and 1 August 1999.

== Medalists ==
Gold	Tomasz Ścigaczewski; Poland
Silver	Staņislavs Olijars; Latvia
Bronze	Jan Schindzielorz; Germany

== Results ==
=== Final ===
1 August
Wind: 0.4 m/s

Rank	Name	Nationality	Time	Notes
1st place, gold medalist(s)	Tomasz Ścigaczewski	Poland	13.36	
2nd place, silver medalist(s)	Staņislavs Olijars	Latvia	13.55	
3rd place, bronze medalist(s)	Jan Schindzielorz	Germany	13.71	
4	Balázs Kovács	Hungary	13.82	
5	Damien Greaves	United Kingdom	13.87	
6	Eric Ciolfi	France	13.89	
7	Rui Palma	Portugal	14.11	
	Marcin Kuśzewski	Poland	DQ	

=== Semifinals ===
1 August
Qualified: first 4 in each to the Final

==== Semifinal 1 ====
Wind: 1.0 m/s

Rank	Name	Nationality	Time	Notes
1	Tomasz Ścigaczewski	Poland	13.47	Q
2	Balázs Kovács	Hungary	13.81	Q
3	Eric Ciolfi	France	13.88	Q
4	Rui Palma	Portugal	13.97	Q
5	Sergey Khodanovich	Belarus	13.98	
6	Artur Budziłło	Poland	13.99	
7	Ionuț Pungă	Romania	14.00	
8	Djeke Mambo	Belgium	14.06	

==== Semifinal 2 ====
Wind: 0.7 m/s

Rank	Name	Nationality	Time	Notes
1	Staņislavs Olijars	Latvia	13.62	Q
2	Jan Schindzielorz	Germany	13.84	Q
3	Damien Greaves	United Kingdom	13.86	Q
4	Marcin Kuśzewski	Poland	13.90	Q
5	Gergely Palágyi	Hungary	13.91	
6	Zhivko Videnov	Bulgaria	13.97	
7	Daniel Carrillo	Spain	14.21	
	Désiré Delric	France	DNF	

=== Heats ===
31 July
Qualified: first 3 in each heat and 4 best to the Semifinal

==== Heat 1 ====
Wind: 0.5 m/s

Rank	Name	Nationality	Time	Notes
1	Balázs Kovács	Hungary	13.90	Q
2	Sergey Khodanovich	Belarus	14.12	Q
3	Artur Budziłło	Poland	14.21	Q
4	Eric Poitou	France	14.23	
5	Vytautas Kancleris	Lithuania	14.31	
	Jerome Crews	Germany	DNF	

==== Heat 2 ====
Wind: 0.3 m/s

Rank	Name	Nationality	Time	Notes
1	Tomasz Ścigaczewski	Poland	13.62	Q
2	Eric Ciolfi	France	13.89	Q
3	Gergely Palágyi	Hungary	13.99	Q
4	Ionuț Pungă	Romania	14.11	q
5	Igor Yastrebov	Russia	14.20	
6	Duncan Malins	United Kingdom	14.50	

==== Heat 3 ====
Wind: 1.0 m/s

Rank	Name	Nationality	Time	Notes
1	Staņislavs Olijars	Latvia	13.62	Q
2	Damien Greaves	United Kingdom	13.89	Q
3	Zhivko Videnov	Bulgaria	14.01	Q
4	Désiré Delric	France	14.05	q
5	Daniel Carrillo	Spain	14.14	q
6	Damjan Zlatnar	Slovenia	14.54	

==== Heat 4 ====
Wind: -0.2 m/s

Rank	Name	Nationality	Time	Notes
1	Jan Schindzielorz	Germany	13.89	Q
2	Marcin Kuśzewski	Poland	13.90	Q
3	Rui Palma	Portugal	13.96	Q
4	Djeke Mambo	Belgium	14.17	q
5	Attila Kilvinger	Hungary	14.17	
6	Henrik Ögren	Sweden	15.07	

== Participation ==
According to an unofficial count, 24 athletes from 16 countries participated in the event.

- Belarus (1)
- Belgium (1)
- Bulgaria (1)
- France (3)
- Germany (2)
- Hungary (3)
- Latvia (1)
- Lithuania (1)
- Poland (3)
- Portugal (1)
- Romania (1)
- Russia (1)
- Slovenia (1)
- Spain (1)
- Sweden (1)
- United Kingdom (2)
