= Athletics at the 2004 Summer Olympics – Men's 110 metres hurdles =

Men's 110 metres hurdles at the Games of the XXVIII Olympiad
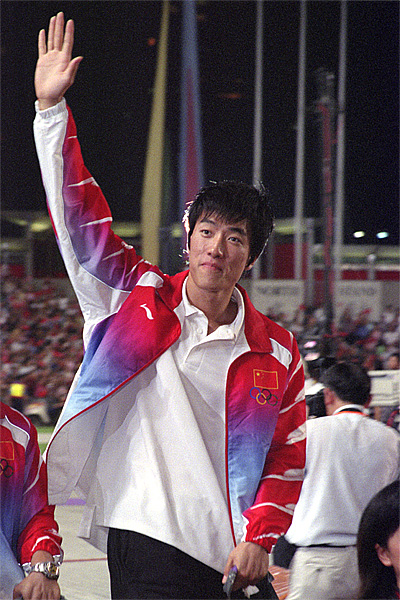
- Liu Xiang later in 2004
- Venue: Athens Olympic Stadium
- Dates: 24–27 August
- Competitors: 47 from 34 nations
- Winning time: 12.91 =WR

Medalists
1st place, gold medalist(s)		Liu Xiang	China
2nd place, silver medalist(s)		Terrence Trammell	United States
3rd place, bronze medalist(s)		Anier García	Cuba

Official Video

The men's 110 metre hurdles at the 2004 Summer Olympics as part of the athletics program were held at the Athens Olympic Stadium from August 24 to 27. Forty-seven athletes from 34 nations competed. The event was won by Liu Xiang of China, the nation's first medal in the event. Terrence Trammell and Anier García became the 11th and 12th men to win multiple medals in the 110 metres hurdles.

== Summary ==
Ladji Doucouré was the leader in all of the preliminary rounds, but in the final, Liu Xiang led from the gun, running a flawless race to take the Olympic record and match Colin Jackson's world record with an identical 12.91. Behind him, returning silver medalist Terrence Trammell had a slight lead despite touching nearly every hurdle. As a result of these errors, Staņislavs Olijars appeared to edge ahead, but Olijars hit the sixth hurdle and slowed out of contention. Coming back from an abysmal start, Doucouré became the next to edge ahead, looking like a lock for silver until he struck the final hurdle, leaving Doucouré to stumble across the finish in dead last. Trammell edged García to win his second successive silver.

== Background ==
This was the 25th appearance of the event, which is one of 12 athletics events to have been held at every Summer Olympics. Five finalists from 2000 returned: gold medalist Anier García of Cuba, silver medalist Terrence Trammell and fourth-place finisher (and 1996 gold medalist) Allen Johnson of the United States, seventh-place finisher Dudley Dorival of Haiti, and eighth-place finisher Robert Kronberg of Sweden. Johnson had won the last two World Championships in 2001 and 2003 (along with the 1995 and 1997 worlds). But Liu Xiang of China, who had finished third at the 2003 worlds, had a strong first half of 2004 and was favored in Athens. World runner-up Terrence Trammell of the United States was also a challenger.

Croatia, Ecuador, Estonia, Georgia, Indonesia, Serbia and Montenegro, Slovenia, and Ukraine each made their first appearance in the event. The United States made its 24th appearance, most of any nation (having missed only the boycotted 1980 Games).

== Qualification ==
The qualification period for Athletics was 1 January 2003 to 9 August 2004. For the men's 110 metres hurdles, each National Olympic Committee was permitted to enter up to three athletes that had run the race in 13.55 seconds or faster during the qualification period. The maximum number of athletes per nation had been set at 3 since the 1930 Olympic Congress. If an NOC had no athletes that qualified under that standard, one athlete that had run the race in 13.72 seconds or faster could be entered.

== Competition format ==
The competition used the four-round format previously used in 1960 and since 1988, still using the eight-man semifinals and finals used since 1964. The "fastest loser" system, also introduced in 1964, was used in the first round.

The top four runners in each of the initial six heats automatically qualified for the second round. The next eight fastest runners from across the heats also qualified. Those 32 runners competed in 4 heats in the second round, with the top three runners from each heat and the four next fastest runners qualifying for the semifinals. There were two semifinal heats, and only the top four from each heat advanced to the final.

== Records ==
Prior to the competition, the existing World record, Olympic record, and world leading time were as follows:

World record	Colin Jackson (GBR)	12.91 s	Stuttgart, Germany	20 August 1993
Olympic record	Allen Johnson (USA)	12.95 s	Atlanta, United States	29 July 1996
World Leading	Allen Johnson (USA)	13.05 s	Lausanne, Switzerland	6 July 2004

Liu Xiang equalled the world record in the final, setting a new Olympic and Asian record.

Date	Round	Athlete	Time	Notes
14 August	Final	Liu Xiang (CHN)	12.91	=WR, OR, AR

The following national records were established during the competition:

Nation	Athlete	Round	Time	Notes
France	Ladji Doucouré	Heat 1	13.18	
Japan	Satoru Tanigawa	Heat 1	13.39	
Madagascar	Joseph-Berlioz Randriamihaja	Heat 1	13.46	
Sudan	Todd Matthews-Jouda	Heat 2	13.47	
Colombia	Paulo Villar	Heat 4	13.44	
Barbados	Stephen Jones	Heat 5	13.56	
Ecuador	Jackson Quiñónez	Heat 6	13.44	
Jamaica	Maurice Wignall	Semifinal 1	13.17	
France	Ladji Doucouré	Semifinal 2	13.06	
China	Liu Xiang	Final	12.91	=WR, OR, AR

== Schedule ==
All rounds were held on separate days for the first time since 1972.

All times are Greece Standard Time (UTC+2)

Date	Time	Round
Tuesday, 24 August 2004	09:35	Round 1
Wednesday, 25 August 2004	22:15	Quarterfinals
Thursday, 26 August 2004	21:00	Semifinals
Friday, 27 August 2004	21:30	Final

== Results ==
=== Round 1 ===
Qualification rule: The first four finishers in each heat (Q) plus the next eight fastest overall runners (q) qualified.

==== Heat 1 ====
Rank	Lane	Athlete	Nation	Reaction	Time	Notes
1	8	Ladji Doucouré	France	0.205	13.18	Q, NR
2	4	Staņislavs Olijars	Latvia	0.154	13.27	Q
3	5	Satoru Tanigawa	Japan	0.128	13.39	Q, NR
4	3	Márcio de Souza	Brazil	0.162	13.43	Q, SB
5	7	Joseph-Berlioz Randriamihaja	Madagascar	0.168	13.46	q, NR
6	1	Felipe Vivancos	Spain	0.113	13.47	q, PB
7	2	Jerome Crews	Germany	0.178	13.83	
8	6	Nenad Lončar	Serbia and Montenegro	0.157	14.02	
				Wind: +1.5 m/s		

==== Heat 2 ====
Rank	Lane	Athlete	Nation	Reaction	Time	Notes
1	1	Dudley Dorival	Haiti	0.169	13.39	Q, SB
2	4	Yoel Hernández	Cuba	0.176	13.41	Q
3	8	Chris Pinnock	Jamaica	0.192	13.42	Q, SB
4	2	Todd Matthews-Jouda	Sudan	0.170	13.47	Q, NR
5	3	Terrence Trammell	United States	0.185	13.51	q
6	5	Shaun Bownes	South Africa	0.164	13.52	q
7	6	Damjan Zlatnar	Slovenia	0.132	13.66	q, =NR
8	7	Jurica Grabušić	Croatia	0.166	13.87	
				Wind: +1.8 m/s		

==== Heat 3 ====
Rank	Lane	Athlete	Nation	Reaction	Time	Notes
1	4	Liu Xiang	China	0.128	13.27	Q
2	6	Charles Allen	Canada	0.149	13.35	Q, PB
3	7	Robert Kronberg	Sweden	0.179	13.47	Q
4	5	Igor Peremota	Russia	0.142	13.54	Q
5	2	Masato Naito	Japan	0.162	13.56	q, SB
6	1	Serhiy Demydyuk	Ukraine	0.163	13.80	
7	3	Park Tae-kyong	South Korea	0.179	13.96	
8	8	Luís Sá	Portugal	0.177	14.01	
				Wind: +1.3 m/s		

==== Heat 4 ====
Rank	Lane	Athlete	Nation	Reaction	Time	Notes
1	4	Paulo Villar	Colombia	0.193	13.44	Q, NR
2	5	Matheus Inocêncio	Brazil	0.157	13.45	Q, =SB
3	2	Allen Johnson	United States	0.176	13.45	Q
4	1	Evgeny Pechonkin	Russia	0.150	13.64	Q
5	7	Gregory Sedoc	Netherlands	0.186	13.65	q
6	8	Shi Dongpeng	China	0.156	13.68	
7	6	Robert Newton	Great Britain	0.176	13.85	
8	3	Edy Jakariya	Indonesia	0.188	14.11	NR
				Wind: -1.3 m/s		

==== Heat 5 ====
Rank	Lane	Athlete	Nation	Reaction	Time	Notes
1	2	Anier García	Cuba	0.158	13.24	Q, SB
2	4	Duane Ross	United States	0.162	13.39	Q
3	7	Mike Fenner	Germany	0.160	13.53	Q, SB
4	6	Stephen Jones	Barbados	0.184	13.56	Q, NR
5	1	Sergey Chepiga	Russia	0.160	13.59	q
6	8	David Ilariani	Georgia	0.168	13.72	
7	3	Levente Csillag	Hungary	0.148	13.74	
8	5	Andy Turner	Great Britain	0.155	13.75	
				Wind: +0.8 m/s		

==== Heat 6 ====
Rank	Lane	Athlete	Nation	Reaction	Time	Notes
1	6	Maurice Wignall	Jamaica	0.160	13.30	Q, =SB
2	6	Richard Phillips	Jamaica	0.138	13.39	Q, PB
3	6	Jackson Quiñónez	Ecuador	0.167	13.44	Q, NR
4	6	Yuniel Hernández	Cuba	0.151	13.48	Q, =SB
5	6	Sultan Tucker	Liberia	0.181	13.76	
6	6	Tarmo Jallai	Estonia	0.150	13.77	
7	6	Mubarak Ata Mubarak	Saudi Arabia	0.134	13.81	
—	6	Redelén Melo dos Santos	Brazil	DNS		
				Wind: +1.2 m/s		

=== Quarterfinals ===
Qualification rule: The first three finishers in each heat (Q) plus the next four fastest overall runners (q) qualified.

==== Quarterfinal 1 ====
Rank	Lane	Athlete	Nation	Reaction	Time	Notes
1	3	Ladji Doucouré	France	0.198	13.23	Q
2	4	Charles Allen	Canada	0.149	13.30	Q, PB
3	8	Robert Kronberg	Sweden	0.154	13.39	Q, SB
4	5	Duane Ross	United States	0.155	13.50	q
5	1	Evgeny Pechonkin	Russia	0.151	13.53	
6	7	Joseph-Berlioz Randriamihaja	Madagascar	0.210	13.64	
7	6	Jackson Quiñónez	Ecuador	0.163	13.67	
—	2	Damjan Zlatnar	Slovenia	DNS		
				Wind: +1.5 m/s		

==== Quarterfinal 2 ====
Rank	Lane	Athlete	Nation	Reaction	Time	Notes
1	5	Staņislavs Olijars	Latvia	0.169	13.26	Q
2	4	Anier García	Cuba	0.159	13.28	Q
3	3	Richard Phillips	Jamaica	0.161	13.44	Q
4	2	Felipe Vivancos	Spain	0.154	13.48	q
5	8	Mike Fenner	Germany	0.128	13.53	=SB
6	7	Stephen Jones	Barbados	0.227	13.85	
—	6	Allen Johnson	United States	0.190	DNF	
—	1	Gregory Sedoc	Netherlands	0.238	DNF	
				Wind: +1.5 m/s		

==== Quarterfinal 3 ====
Rank	Lane	Athlete	Nation	Reaction	Time	Notes
1	6	Liu Xiang	China	0.202	13.27	Q
2	4	Yoel Hernández	Cuba	0.200	13.29	Q, SB
3	7	Terrence Trammell	United States	0.220	13.34	Q
4	3	Chris Pinnock	Jamaica	0.195	13.47	q
5	2	Márcio de Souza	Brazil	0.165	13.54	
6	1	Masato Naito	Japan	0.157	13.54	SB
7	8	Igor Peremota	Russia	0.130	13.64	
8	5	Paulo Villar	Colombia	0.176	14.03	
				Wind: +1.5 m/s		

==== Quarterfinal 4 ====
Rank	Lane	Athlete	Nation	Reaction	Time	Notes
1	4	Matheus Inocêncio	Brazil	0.140	13.33	Q, PB
2	3	Dudley Dorival	Haiti	0.157	13.39	Q, =SB
3	6	Maurice Wignall	Jamaica	0.157	13.39	Q
4	1	Yuniel Hernández	Cuba	0.137	13.46	q, SB
5	7	Sergey Chepiga	Russia	0.190	13.55	
6	2	Shaun Bownes	South Africa	0.156	13.62	
7	5	Satoru Tanigawa	Japan	0.147	13.70	
8	8	Todd Matthews-Jouda	Sudan	0.203	13.77	
				Wind: +1.5 m/s		

=== Semifinals ===
Qualification rule: The first four finishers in each heat (Q) moved on to the final.

==== Semifinal 1 ====
Rank	Lane	Athlete	Nation	Reaction	Time	Notes
1	7	Maurice Wignall	Jamaica	0.162	13.17	Q, NR
2	4	Liu Xiang	China	0.151	13.18	Q
3	6	Staņislavs Olijars	Latvia	0.151	13.20	Q, SB
4	3	Charles Allen	Canada	0.150	13.23	Q, PB
5	8	Duane Ross	United States	0.157	13.30	
6	5	Yoel Hernández	Cuba	0.174	13.37	
7	1	Robert Kronberg	Sweden	0.124	13.42	
8	2	Chris Pinnock	Jamaica	0.196	13.57	
				Wind: -0.1 m/s		

==== Semifinal 2 ====
Rank	Lane	Athlete	Nation	Reaction	Time	Notes
1	5	Ladji Doucouré	France	0.200	13.06	Q, NR
2	2	Terrence Trammell	United States	0.165	13.17	Q
3	6	Anier García	Cuba	0.172	13.30	Q
4	3	Matheus Inocêncio	Brazil	0.154	13.34	Q
5	4	Dudley Dorival	Haiti	0.162	13.39	=SB
6	7	Richard Phillips	Jamaica	0.143	13.47	
7	8	Felipe Vivancos	Spain	0.144	13.52	
—	1	Yuniel Hernández	Cuba	DNS		
				Wind: +0.0 m/s		

=== Final ===
Rank	Lane	Athlete	Nation	Reaction	Time	Notes
1st place, gold medalist(s)	4	Liu Xiang	China	0.139	12.91	=WR, OR, NR
2nd place, silver medalist(s)	6	Terrence Trammell	United States	0.154	13.18	
3rd place, bronze medalist(s)	7	Anier García	Cuba	0.169	13.20	SB
4	5	Maurice Wignall	Jamaica	0.164	13.21	
5	2	Staņislavs Olijars	Latvia	0.174	13.21	
6	1	Charles Allen	Canada	0.139	13.48	
7	8	Matheus Inocêncio	Brazil	0.169	13.49	
8	3	Ladji Doucouré	France	0.204	13.76	
				Wind: +0.3 m/s		
