= 2002 African Championships in Athletics – Men's 110 metres hurdles =

The men's 110 metres hurdles event at the 2002 African Championships in Athletics was held in Radès, Tunisia on August 7.

== Results ==
Wind: +4.8 m/s

Rank	Name	Nationality	Time	Notes
1st place, gold medalist(s)	Shaun Bownes	South Africa	13.36	
2nd place, silver medalist(s)	Joseph-Berlioz Randriamihaja	Madagascar	13.80	
3rd place, bronze medalist(s)	Sultan Tucker	Liberia	13.98	
4	Hamdi Mhirsi	Tunisia	14.17	
5	Abderrahmane Dali Bey	Algeria	14.91	
6	Ezzedine Abdurrahman	Libya	15.00	
7	Arlindo Pinheiro	São Tomé and Príncipe	15.09	
