= Adrian Woodley =

Canadian hurdler

Personal information
- Born: 25 September 1975 (age 50) Whitby, Ontario, Canada
- Education: Syracuse University
- Height: 1.80 m (5 ft 11 in)
- Weight: 73 kg (161 lb)

Sport
- Sport: Athletics
- Event: 110 m hurdles
- College team: Syracuse Orange

Adrian Woodley (born 25 September 1975) is a Canadian retired athlete who specialised in the 110 metres hurdles. He represented his country at the 2000 Summer Olympics, as well as one outdoor and one indoor World Championships.

His personal bests are 13.52 seconds in the 110 meters hurdles (+2.0 m/s, Kitchener 2000) and 7.75 seconds in the 60 metres hurdles (Toronto 2001).

== Competition record ==
Year	Competition	Venue	Position	Event	Notes
Representing Canada
1993	Pan American Junior Championships	Winnipeg, Manitoba, Canada	5th	110 m hurdles	14.76
1993	Pan American Junior Championships	Winnipeg, Manitoba, Canada	8th	Triple jump	14.75 m
1994	World Junior Championships	Lisbon, Portugal	13th (h)	110 m hurdles	14.28
1994	Commonwealth Games	Victoria, British Columbia, Canada	11th (h)	110 m hurdles	14.50
1999	Pan American Games	Winnipeg, Manitoba, Canada	10th (h)	110 m hurdles	13.77
1999	World Championships	Seville, Spain	37th (h)	110 m hurdles	13.95
2000	Olympic Games	Sydney, Australia	27th (qf)	110 m hurdles	14.04
2000	Olympic Games	Sydney, Australia	11th (sf)	4 × 100 m relay	38.92
2001	World Indoor Championships	Lisbon, Portugal	17th (h)	60 m hurdles	7.84
