= Athletics at the 1999 Pan American Games – Men's 110 metres hurdles =

Men's 110 metres hurdles at the Pan American Games

The men's 110 metres hurdles event at the 1999 Pan American Games was held July 28–30.

== Medalists ==
| Gold | Silver | Bronze |
|---|---|---|
| Anier García; Cuba | Yoel Hernández; Cuba | Eugene Swift; United States |

== Results ==
=== Heats ===
Qualification: First 3 of each heat (Q) and the next 2 fastest (q) qualified for the final.

Wind:
Heat 1: +0.8 m/s, Heat 2: +1.6 m/s

| Rank | Heat | Name | Nationality | Time | Notes |
|---|---|---|---|---|---|
| 1 | 2 | Eugene Swift | United States | 13.21 | Q |
| 2 | 2 | Dominique Arnold | United States | 13.21 | Q |
| 3 | 2 | Yoel Hernández | Cuba | 13.43 | Q |
| 4 | 2 | Luiz André Balcers | Brazil | 13.46 | q, PB |
| 5 | 2 | Jeffrey Jackson | United States Virgin Islands | 13.50 | q |
| 6 | 1 | Anier García | Cuba | 13.58 | Q |
| 7 | 1 | Steve Brown | Trinidad and Tobago | 13.59 | Q |
| 8 | 1 | Maurice Wignall | Jamaica | 13.66 | Q |
| 9 | 1 | Márcio de Souza | Brazil | 13.67 | |
| 10 | 1 | Adrian Woodley | Canada | 13.77 | |
| 11 | 1 | Wagner Marseille | Haiti | 13.88 | |
| 12 | 2 | Gabriel Burnett | Barbados | 13.95 | |
| 13 | 1 | Jackson Quiñónez | Ecuador | 14.28 | |

=== Final ===
Wind: +1.1 m/s

| Rank | Name | Nationality | Time | Notes |
|---|---|---|---|---|
| 1st place, gold medalist(s) | Anier García | Cuba | 13.17 | GR |
| 2nd place, silver medalist(s) | Yoel Hernández | Cuba | 13.24 | PB |
| 3rd place, bronze medalist(s) | Eugene Swift | United States | 13.41 | |
| 4 | Dominique Arnold | United States | 13.45 | |
| 5 | Steve Brown | Trinidad and Tobago | 13.53 | |
| 6 | Luiz André Balcers | Brazil | 13.64 | |
| 7 | Maurice Wignall | Jamaica | 13.76 | |
| 8 | Jeffrey Jackson | United States Virgin Islands | 13.83 | |
