= Jeff Jackson (hurdler) =

United States Virgin Islander sportsman

Personal information
- Nationality: United States Virgin Islander

Sport
- Sport: Track and field
- Event: 110 metres hurdles

Jeff Jackson (born March 14, 1974) is a 5X All-American, and 3X Southwest Champion hurdler who represented the United States Virgin Islands at the 2000 Summer Olympics. In 1996, he placed 4th at the Atlanta Olympics Trials, missing the final cut by mere hundreds of seconds, and then, competing in the men's 110 meters hurdles in Sydney.

Jackson's athletic accomplishments started in high school when he won the Texas State Championship (1992) in the 110m hurdles, US Jr. National Title in both 110m and 400m hurdles, and the Jr. Pan Am title in the 110m hurdle. Jackson attended Baylor University and still holds the University's record in the 110m hurdle. He was inducted into the Baylor Athletics Hall of Fame in 2017.
