= Paolo Della Santa =

Swiss hurdler

Personal information
- Nationality: Swiss
- Born: 11 September 1973 (age 52)

Sport
- Sport: Track and field
- Event: 110 metres hurdles

Paolo Della Santa (born 11 September 1973) is a Swiss hurdler. He competed in the men's 110 metres hurdles at the 2000 Summer Olympics.
