= Athletics at the 2002 Commonwealth Games – Men's 110 metres hurdles =

Men's 110 metres hurdles at the Commonwealth Games

The men's 110 metres hurdles event at the 2002 Commonwealth Games was held on 29–30 July.

== Medalists ==
Gold	Silver	Bronze
Shaun Bownes; South Africa	Colin Jackson; Wales	Maurice Wignall; Jamaica

== Results ==
=== Heats ===
Qualification: First 2 of each heat (Q) and the next 2 fastest (q) qualified for the final.

Wind:
Heat 1: –0.2 m/s, Heat 2: +0.1 m/s, Heat 3: +0.7 m/s

Rank	Heat	Name	Nationality	Time	Notes
1	3	Colin Jackson	Wales	13.34	Q
2	2	Shaun Bownes	South Africa	13.48	Q
3	1	Charles Allen	Canada	13.60	Q
4	2	Tony Jarrett	England	13.65	Q
5	1	Maurice Wignall	Jamaica	13.68	Q
6	3	Damien Greaves	England	13.78	Q
7	2	Christopher Baillie	Scotland	13.95	q, SB
8	2	Ricardo Melbourne	Jamaica	13.99	q
9	3	Gabriel Burnett	Barbados	14.08	
10	2	Paul Gray	Wales	14.11	
11	3	Greg Hines	Jamaica	14.19	
12	1	Mensah Elliott	England	14.27	
13	3	Stephanos Ioannou	Cyprus	14.37	
14	1	Mumtaz Ahmad	Pakistan	14.48	
15	2	Avele Tanielu	Samoa	14.93	
	1	Shamar Sands	Bahamas	DNS	
	3	Shah Dilawar Hussan	Bangladesh	DNS	

=== Final ===
Wind: +0.4 m/s

Rank	Name	Nationality	Time	Notes
1st place, gold medalist(s)	Shaun Bownes	South Africa	13.35	SB
2nd place, silver medalist(s)	Colin Jackson	Wales	13.39	
3rd place, bronze medalist(s)	Maurice Wignall	Jamaica	13.62	
4	Tony Jarrett	England	13.70	
5	Charles Allen	Canada	13.71	
6	Ricardo Melbourne	Jamaica	13.94	
7	Christopher Baillie	Scotland	14.73	
	Damien Greaves	England	DNF	
