= Márcio de Souza =

Brazilian hurdler

Personal information
- Born: 24 January 1975 (age 51) Santo André, São Paulo, Brazil

Sport
- Sport: Track and field
Medal record
Representing Brazil
Pan American Games
Bronze medal – third place	2003 Santo Domingo	110m hurdles

Márcio Simão de Souza (born 24 January 1975) is a retired Brazilian hurdler who specialised in the 110 metres hurdles. Early in his career he competed as a decathlete.

He finished fifth at the 2003 World Championships in Paris and won a bronze medal at the 2003 Pan American Games in Santo Domingo.

His personal best time is 13.38 seconds, achieved in June 1999 in Rio de Janeiro.

== Competition record ==
Year	Competition	Venue	Position	Event	Notes
Representing Brazil
1993	South American Junior Championships	Puerto La Cruz, Venezuela	1st	Decathlon	6613 pts
1994	World Junior Championships	Lisbon, Portugal	18th	Decathlon	6286 pts
1994	South American Junior Championships	Santa Fe, Argentina	1st	Decathlon	6530 pts
1995	South American Championships	Manaus, Brazil	2nd	Decathlon	6762 pts
1996	Ibero-American Championships	Medellín, Colombia	4th	Decathlon	7112 pts
1997	Universiade	Catania, Italy	20th (sf)	110 m hurdles	14.31
1998	Ibero-American Championships	Lisbon, Portugal	4th	110 m hurdles	14.13
1999	South American Championships	Bogotá, Colombia	3rd	110 m hurdles	14.37
1999	Universiade	Palma de Mallorca, Spain	7th	110 m hurdles	14.04
1999	Pan American Games	Winnipeg, Canada	9th (h)	110 m hurdles	13.67
1999	World Championships	Seville, Spain	34th (h)	110 m hurdles	13.83
2000	Ibero-American Championships	Rio de Janeiro, Brazil	1st	110 m hurdles	13.76
2000	Olympic Games	Sydney, Australia	17th (qf)	110 m hurdles	13.71
2001	South American Championships	Manaus, Brazil	1st	110 m hurdles	13.64
2001	World Championships	Edmonton, Canada	28th (h)	110 m hurdles	13.88
2001	Universiade	Beijing, China	18th (h)	110 m hurdles	14.09
2003	World Indoor Championships	Birmingham, United Kingdom	17th (h)	60 m hurdles	7.80
2003	Pan American Games	Santo Domingo, Dominican Republic	3rd	110 m hurdles	13.45
2003	World Championships	Paris, France	5th	110 m hurdles	13.48
2004	World Indoor Championships	Budapest, Hungary	20th (h)	60 m hurdles	7.78
2004	Olympic Games	Athens, Greece	19th (qf)	110 m hurdles	13.54
