= Emiliano Pizzoli =

Italian hurdler

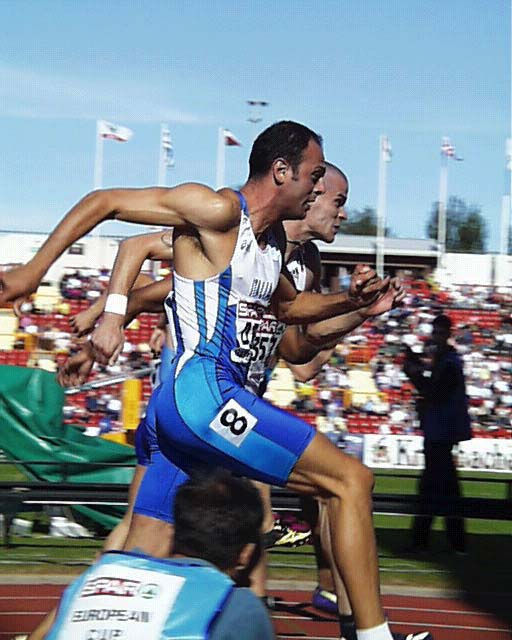

Personal information
- Nationality: Italian
- Born: 29 June 1974 (age 52) Rieti, Italy
- Height: 1.92 m (6 ft 3 1/2 in)
- Weight: 80 kg (176 lb)

Sport
- Country: Italy
- Sport: Athletics
- Event: 110 metres hurdles
- Club: C.S. Carabinieri

Achievements and titles
- Personal bests: 110 m hs: 13.43 (1998); 60 m hs: 7.60 (1999)
Medal record
Mediterranean Games
Bronze medal – third place	1997 Bari	110 m hs
European Cup
Silver medal – second place	2000 Gateshead	110 m hs
World Military Championships
Bronze medal – third place	2001 Beirut	110 m hs

Emiliano Pizzoli (born 29 June 1974 in Rieti) is a former Italian hurdler.

== Biography ==
Emiliano Pizzoli won two medals, at senior level, at the International athletics competitions. He participated at one edition of the Summer Olympics (2000), he has 19 caps in national team from 1995 to 2008. His personal best time is 13.43 seconds, achieved in June 1998 in Milan. The Italian records currently belongs to Emanuele Abate with 13.28 seconds (outdoor) and 7.57 (indoor).

He won the bronze medal at the 1997 Mediterranean Games. He also participated at the World Championships in 1999, the World Indoor Championships in 1999 and 2001 and the 2000 Olympic Games without reaching the final.

== National records ==
- 60 metres hurdles: 7.60 ( (Spain) Valencia, 28 February 1998) - holder till 4 February 2012

== Achievements ==
Year	Competition	Venue	Position	Event	Time	Notes
1998	European Indoor Championships	(Spain) Valencia	Semi	60 m hs	7.68	NR (7.60 sets in heat)
1999	World Indoor Championships	(Japan) Maebashi	Semi	60 m hs	7.67	SB
1999	World Championships	(Spain) Seville	Heat	110 m hs	13.79	
2000	European Indoor Championships	(Belgium) Ghent	Semi	60 m hs	7.71	
2000	Olympic Games	(Australia) Sydney	Quarter	110 m hs	13.69	
2001	World Indoor Championships	(Portugal) Lisbon	Semi	60 m hs	7.78	
2002	European Championships	(Germany) Munich	Semi	110 m hs	13.59	SB

== National titles ==
He has won 11 times the individual national championship.

- 5 wins in the 110 metres hurdles (2000, 2001, 2002, 2003, 2004)
- 6 wins in the 60 metres hurdles indoor (1999, 2000, 2001, 2003, 2004, 2007)

== See also ==
- Italian all-time top lists - 110 metres hurdles
