= Shaun Bownes =

South African hurdler

Medal record

Men's athletics

Representing South Africa

World Indoor Championships
Bronze medal – third place	2001 Lisbon	60 m hurdles

All-Africa Games
Bronze medal – third place	2007 Algiers	110 m hurdles

African Championships
Gold medal – first place	1998 Dakar	110 m hurdles
Gold medal – first place	2002 Radès	110 m hurdles
Silver medal – second place	2004 Brazzaville	110 m hurdles

Commonwealth Games
Gold medal – first place	2002 Manchester	110 m hurdles
Bronze medal – third place	1998 Kuala Lumpur	110 m hurdles

WMA World Indoor Championships
Gold medal – first place	2014 Budapest	60 m hurdles

Shaun Bownes (born 24 October 1970, in Johannesburg) is a South African hurdler.

His personal best time is 13.26 seconds, achieved in July 2001 in Heusden. This was the African record until 2012 when it was beaten by Lehann Fourie. He still holds the African record in 60 metres hurdles (indoor) with 7.52 seconds, achieved in February 2001 in Ghent. In 2014 (aged 43) he won the M40 60 metres hurdles (indoor) at the World Masters Athletics Indoor Championships in Budapest in a time of 8,12 seconds (having set a time of 8.08 seconds in the preliminaries).

== Achievements ==
Year	Competition	Venue	Position	Event	Notes
Representing South Africa
1998	African Championships	Dakar, Senegal	1st	110 m hurdles	13.72
1998	Commonwealth Games	Kuala Lumpur, Malaysia	3rd	110 m hurdles	13.53
1999	World Championships	Seville, Spain	28th (qf)	110 m hurdles	13.74
1999	All-Africa Games	Johannesburg, South Africa	5th	110 m hurdles	14.12
2000	Olympic Games	Sydney, Australia	9th (sf)	110 m hurdles	13.41
2001	World Indoor Championships	Lisbon, Portugal	3rd	60 m hurdles	7.55
2001	World Championships	Edmonton, Canada	8th	110 m hurdles	13.84
2002	Commonwealth Games	Manchester, United Kingdom	1st	110 m hurdles	13.35
2002	African Championships	Radès, Tunisia	1st	110 m hurdles	13.36 (w)
2003	World Indoor Championships	Birmingham, United Kingdom	8th	60 m hurdles	7.67
2003	World Championships	Paris, France	6th (sf)	110 m hurdles	13.53
2004	World Indoor Championships	Budapest, Hungary	11th (sf)	60 m hurdles	7.67
2004	African Championships	Brazzaville, Congo	2nd	110 m hurdles	13.80
2004	Olympic Games	Athens, Greece	22nd (sf)	110 m hurdles	13.62
2006	Commonwealth Games	Melbourne, Australia	6th	110 m hurdles	13.70
2006	African Championships	Bambous, Mauritius	4th (h)	110 m hurdles	14.26
2007	All-Africa Games	Algiers, Algeria	3rd	110 m hurdles	13.81
2007	World Championships	Osaka, Japan	31st (h)	110 m hurdles	13.81
2014	WMA World Indoor Championships	Budapest, Hungary	1st	M40 60 m hurdles	8.12

[ Men 40-49 World Outdoor Championships Silver medal Lyon France ] [ Unofficial world masters record 60m Hurdles 8.05 ( Outdoor) Potchefstroom 2016 ] [ 2016 World Masters record 110 m Hurdles Pretoria 14.38 ]
