= Tomasz Ścigaczewski =

Polish hurdler

Personal information
- Nationality: Polish
- Born: 18 November 1978 Zgierz, Poland
- Died: Poland

Sport
- Sport: Track and field
- Event: 60 m hurdles
Medal record
Representing Poland
Men's athletics
European Indoor Championships
Silver medal – second place	1998 Valencia	60 m hurdles
Bronze medal – third place	2000 Ghent	60 m hurdles

Tomasz Ścigaczewski (born 18 November 1978, in Zgierz) is a former Polish hurdler.

His personal best time for the 110 m hurdles is 13.29 seconds, achieved in June 1999 in Oslo. This ranks him second among Polish 110 m hurdlers, only behind Artur Kohutek.

== Competition record ==
Year	Competition	Venue	Position	Event	Notes
Representing Poland
1995	European Junior Championships	Nyíregyháza, Hungary	3rd	110 m hurdles	14.18
1996	World Junior Championships	Sydney, Australia	2nd	110 m hurdles	13.88 (wind: +1.8 m/s)
1997	European Junior Championships	Ljubljana, Slovenia	1st	110 m hurdles	13.55
1997	World Championships	Athens, Greece	28th (qf)	110 m hurdles	13.73
1998	European Indoor Championships	Valencia, Spain	2nd	60 m hurdles	7.56
1999	World Indoor Championships	Maebashi, Japan	5th	60 m hurdles	7.52
1999	European U23 Championships	Gothenburg, Sweden	1st	110 m hurdles	13.36 (wind: +0.4 m/s)
1999	World Championships	Seville, Spain	18th (qf)	110 m hurdles	13.54
2000	European Indoor Championships	Ghent, Belgium	3rd	60 m hurdles	7.56
2000	Olympic Games	Sydney, Australia	12th (sf)	110 m hurdles	13.51
