= Peter Coghlan =

Irish track and field athlete

Personal information
- Born: 27 March 1975 (age 51) Dublin, Ireland

Sport
- Sport: Track and field

Peter Coghlan (born 27 March 1975) is a retired Irish track and field athlete who specialised in the 110 metres hurdles event. He represented his country at the 2000 Summer Olympics in Sydney, as well as five outdoor and two indoor World Championships.

His personal bests of 13.30 for the 110 metres hurdles and 7.57 for the 60 metres hurdles, both from 1999, are current national records.

He attended Belvedere College secondary school in Dublin at the same time as fellow Olympian Cian O'Connor.

== Competition record ==
| Year | Competition | Venue | Position | Event | Notes |
Representing Ireland
| 1997 | European U23 Championships | Turku, Finland | 15th (sf) | 110 m hurdles | 14.66 |
| 1997 | World Championships | Athens, Greece | 35th (h) | 110 m hurdles | 13.94 |
| 1998 | European Championships | Budapest, Hungary | 20th (h) | 110 m hurdles | 14.00 |
| 1999 | World Indoor Championships | Maebashi, Japan | 11th (h) | 60 m hurdles | 7.66 |
| 1999 | Universiade | Palma de Mallorca, Spain | 4th | 110 m hurdles | 13.63 |
| 1999 | World Championships | Seville, Spain | 8th (sf) | 110 m hurdles | 13.35 |
| 2000 | Olympic Games | Sydney, Australia | 23rd (qf) | 110 m hurdles | 13.86 |
| 2001 | World Indoor Championships | Lisbon, Portugal | 10th (sf) | 60 m hurdles | 7.67 |
| 2001 | World Championships | Edmonton, Canada | 17th (sf) | 110 m hurdles | 13.61 |
| 2002 | European Indoor Championships | Vienna, Austria | 6th | 60 m hurdles | 7.67 |
| 2002 | European Championships | Munich, Germany | 26th (h) | 110 m hurdles | 13.96 |
| 2003 | World Championships | Paris, France | 27th (h) | 110 m hurdles | 13.90 |
| 2005 | European Indoor Championships | Madrid, Spain | 18th (h) | 60 m hurdles | 7.82 |
| 2005 | World Championships | Helsinki, Finland | 39th (h) | 110 m hurdles | 14.57 |
