= Satoru Tanigawa =

Japanese hurdler (born 1972)

Personal information
- Born: 5 July 1972 (age 54) Tokyo, Japan

Sport
- Sport: Track and field
Medal record
Representing Japan
Asian Games
Silver medal – second place	2002 Busan	110m hurdles
East Asian Games
Bronze medal – third place	2001 Osaka	110m hurdles

Satoru Tanigawa (谷川 聡, Tanigawa Satoru; born 5 July 1972) is a retired Japanese athlete who specialised in the 110 metres hurdles. He represented his country at the 2000 and 2004 Summer Olympics reaching the second round on both occasions.

His personal best of 13.39 (+1.5 m/s), set in the heats of the 2004 Olympic Games, is the current national record.

== Competition record ==
Year	Competition	Venue	Position	Event	Notes
Representing Japan
1997	Universiade	Catania, Italy	13th (sf)	110 m hurdles	13.94
1998	Asian Games	Bangkok, Thailand	5th	110 m hurdles	14.37
1999	Universiade	Palma de Mallorca, Spain	14th (sf)	110 m hurdles	14.12
1999	World Championships	Seville, Spain	23rd (h)	110 m hurdles	13.58
2000	Olympic Games	Sydney, Australia	25th (qf)	110 m hurdles	13.94
2001	East Asian Games	Osaka, Japan	3rd	110 m hurdles	13.98
2001	World Championships	Edmonton, Canada	27th (h)	110 m hurdles	13.85
2002	Asian Games	Busan, South Korea	2nd	110 m hurdles	13.83
2004	Olympic Games	Athens, Greece	26th (qf)	110 m hurdles	13.70
2005	World Championships	Helsinki, Finland	30th (h)	110 m hurdles	14.25
