= Anier García =

Cuban hurdler (born 1976)

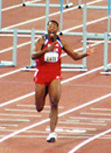

Personal information
- Born: March 9, 1976 (age 50) Santiago de Cuba, Cuba

Sport
- Sport: Track and field
Medal record
Men's athletics
Representing Cuba
Olympic Games
| Gold medal – first place | 2000 Sydney | 110 m hurdles |
| Bronze medal – third place | 2004 Athens | 110 m hurdles |
World Championships
| Silver medal – second place | 1999 Seville | 110 m hurdles |
| Silver medal – second place | 2001 Edmonton | 110 m hurdles |
World Indoor Championships
| Gold medal – first place | 1997 Paris | 60 m hurdles |
| Silver medal – second place | 2001 Lisbon | 60 m hurdles |
| Silver medal – second place | 2003 Birmingham | 60 m hurdles |
Summer Universiade
| Silver medal – second place | 1997 Catania | 4x100m relay |

Anier Octavio García Ortiz (born March 9, 1976) is a Cuban track and field athlete, winner of the 110 metres hurdles at the 2000 Summer Olympics.

Born in Santiago de Cuba, Anier García established his credentials early, by winning the 1995 Pan American Junior Championships. In the next year, at the 1996 Summer Olympics, García was eliminated in the quarter-finals.

In 1997, García broke to the international scene by winning 60 m hurdles at the 1997 World Indoor Championships at Paris. At the World Championships in Athens, he competed with a leg injury, and although he finished second in his quarter-final, he withdrew from the semi-finals. In 1999, García won the Pan-American Games, but was beaten second by Colin Jackson at the World Championships.

The high peak of García's career was at the 2000 Sydney Olympics. The Olympic final was expected to be a tight competition amongst the top five hurdlers, but García won the gold medal easily, beating Terrence Trammell by 0.16 seconds. García repeated his silver medal at the 2001 World Championships and also won silver at the 2001 World Indoor Championships and 2003 World Indoor Championships. García did not compete at the 2003 World Championships due to a thigh injury, but at the 2004 Summer Olympics, he won the bronze medal.

== Personal bests ==
| Date | Event | Venue | Time |
|---|---|---|---|
| September 25, 2000 | 110 m hurdles | Sydney, Australia | 13.00 |

== Achievements ==
| Year | Competition | Venue | Position | Event | Notes |
Representing Cuba
| 1994 | World Junior Championships | Lisbon, Portugal | 5th | 110 m hurdles | 14.05 w (wind: +2.1 m/s) |
| 1994 | World Junior Championships | Lisbon, Portugal | — | 4 × 100 m relay | DQ |
| 1995 | Pan American Junior Championships | Santiago, Chile | 1st | 110 m hurdles | 13.84 |
| 1995 | CAC Championships | Guatemala City, Guatemala | 2nd | 110 m hurdles | 13.71 A |
| 1996 | Ibero-American Championships | Medellín, Colombia | 1st | 110 m hurdles | 13.39 |
| 1996 | Olympic Games | Atlanta, United States | 18th (q-finals) | 110 m hurdles | 13.58 |
| 1997 | World Indoor Championships | Paris, France | 1st | 60 m hurdles | 7.48 |
| 1997 | World Championships | Athens, Greece | 14th (qf) | 110 m hurdles | 13.46 |
| 1998 | CAC Games | Maracaibo, Venezuela | 1st | 110 m hurdles | 13.27 |
| 1998 | IAAF World Cup | Johannesburg, South Africa | 3rd | 110 m hurdles | 13.14 |
| 1999 | World Indoor Championships | Maebashi, Japan | 6th | 60 m hurdles | 7.59 |
| 1999 | Pan American Games | Winnipeg, Canada | 1st | 110 m hurdles | 13.17 |
| 1999 | World Championships | Seville, Spain | 2nd | 110 m hurdles | 13.07 |
| 2000 | Olympic Games | Sydney, Australia | 1st | 110 m hurdles | 13.00 |
| 2001 | World Indoor Championships | Lisbon, Portugal | 2nd | 60 m hurdles | 7.54 |
| 2001 | World Championships | Edmonton, Canada | 2nd | 110 m hurdles | 13.07 |
| 2001 | IAAF Grand Prix Final | Melbourne, Australia | 1st | 110 m hurdles | 13.22 |
| 2001 | Goodwill Games | Brisbane, Australia | 2nd | 110 m hurdles | 13.20 |
| 2002 | IAAF World Cup | Madrid, Spain | 1st | 110 m hurdles | 13.10 |
| 2003 | IAAF World Indoor Championships | Birmingham, United States | 2nd | 60 m hurdles | 7.49 |
| 2004 | Olympic Games | Athens, Greece | 3rd | 110 m hurdles | 13.20 |
| 2005 | World Championships | Helsinki, Finland | 22nd (semis) | 110 m hurdles | 13.99 |

As of 20 November 2024, García holds twelve track records for the 110 metres hurdles set over the period 1996 to 2002. They include the track records for Hamburg (13.34), Melbourne (13.22) and Winnipeg (13.17).

Sporting positions
| Preceded by (United States) Allen Johnson | Men's 110m Hurdles Best Year Performance; 2002 | Succeeded by (United States) Allen Johnson |
