= Mark Crear =

American hurdler

Personal information
- Full name: Mark James Crear
- Born: October 2, 1968 (age 57) San Francisco, California, U.S.
Medal record
Men's athletics
Representing United States
Olympic Games
Silver medal – second place	1996 Atlanta	110 m hurdles
Bronze medal – third place	2000 Sydney	110 m hurdles

Mark James Crear (born October 2, 1968) is a double Olympic medalist in the 110 m hurdles from the United States. In 1996 he was second behind Allen Johnson. Four years later he came in third behind Anier García and silver medalist Terrence Trammell. Mark's personal best was 12.98 seconds.

Crear went to Rowland High School, in the Rowland Heights area of southern California, where he finished second in the 300 meters hurdles and fourth in the 110 meters hurdles at the 1987 CIF California State Meet. He then went to the University of Southern California, where he won the 1992 National Championship in the 110 meters hurdles. He still holds the USC school record in the hurdles.

Crear has over 15 years of Olympic performance, including wins of a 1996 Olympic silver medal and 2000 Olympic bronze medal. He earned both medals in the 110M High Hurdles event while overcoming injuries: a broken arm and double hernia, respectively.

After winning the silver medal in 1996, Crear carried his infant daughter Ebony in his victory lap around the Olympic Stadium. Ebony ran for Maranatha High School and later Long Beach Poly, making the finals of the CIF California State Meet in the 100 meters hurdles once for each school and anchoring Poly to the 2014 state championship in the 4 × 400 meters relay before moving on to Texas A&M University.

Mark Crear travels around the world presenting motivational keynotes and peak performance workshops to various organizations.

== Personal bests ==
Event	Time (sec)	Date	Venue
40-yard dash	4.26	April 3, 1997	Los Angeles, United States
100 meters	10.19	May 14, 1999	Berlin, Germany
200 meters	20.20	May 22, 2000	Mexico City, Mexico
400 meter hurdles	50.20	June 5, 1989	Walnut, United States
110 meter hurdles	12.98	July 5, 1999	Zagreb, Croatia

== Achievements ==
Year	Competition	Venue	Position	Event	Notes
Representing the United States
1994	Goodwill Games	Saint Petersburg, Russia	1st	110 m hurdles	
1996	Summer Olympics	Atlanta, United States	2nd	110 m hurdles	
1997	World Championships	Athens, Greece	7th	110 m hurdles	
1998	Goodwill Games	Uniondale, New York	1st	110 m hurdles	
2000	Summer Olympics	Sydney, Australia	3rd	110 m hurdles	
2001	Goodwill Games	Brisbane, Australia	6th	110 m hurdles	

=== Track records ===
As of 15 September 2024, Crear holds the following track records for 110 metres hurdles.

A performance in red text is wind-assisted.

Location	Time	Windspeed m/s	Date
Bratislava	13.13	+ 0.6	09/06/1998
Fukuoka	13.03	+ 0.3	13/09/1997
Jena	13.10	+ 3.1	03/06/2000
Lucerne	13.02	+ 1.5	27/06/1995
Munich	13.08	+ 0.7	11/09/1999
Rhede	13.09	+ 1.0	30/07/1995
Uniondale, NY.	13.06	+ 0.9	20/07/1998
Zagreb	12.98; PB	+ 0.6	05/07/1999

Sporting positions
Preceded by (United States) Allen Johnson	Men's 110 m Hurdles Best Year Performance; 1999	Succeeded by (United States) Allen Johnson
