= Vincent Clarico =

French hurdler (born 1966)

Vincent Clarico (born 8 January 1966 in Saint-Denis, France) is a French former hurdler who competed at the 1996 Summer Olympics.

== Competition record ==
Year	Competition	Venue	Position	Event	Notes
Representing France
1989	Jeux de la Francophonie	Rabat, Morocco	2nd	110 m hurdles	13.96
1992	European Indoor Championships	Genoa, Italy	26th (h)	60 m hurdles	8.16
1993	Mediterranean Games	Narbonne, France	6th	110 m hurdles	13.98
1993	World Championships	Stuttgart, Germany	30th (h)	110 m hurdles	13.91
1994	European Indoor Championships	Paris, France	11th (sf)	60 m hurdles	7.73
1994	Jeux de la Francophonie	Bondoufle, France	4th	110 m hurdles	13.84
1994	European Championships	Helsinki, Finland	22nd (h)	110 m hurdles	13.81
1995	World Championships	Gothenburg, Sweden	23rd (qf)	110 m hurdles	13.86
1996	Olympic Games	Atlanta, United States	9th (sf)	110 m hurdles	13.43
1997	Mediterranean Games	Bari, Italy	1st	110 m hurdles	13.61
1997	World Championships	Athens, Greece	12th (sf)	110 m hurdles	13.53
1998	European Championships	Budapest, Hungary	10th (sf)	110 m hurdles	13.53
2000	European Indoor Championships	Ghent, Belgium	12th (h)	60 m hurdles	7.76
2001	Jeux de la Francophonie	Ottawa, Canada	2nd	110 m hurdles	13.71
2001	Mediterranean Games	Radès, Tunisia	1st	110 m hurdles	13.62
2002	European Indoor Championships	Vienna, Austria	13th (sf)	60 m hurdles	7.85
