= Gabriel Burnett =

Barbadian hurdler (born 1975)

Personal information
- Nationality: Barbadian
- Born: 20 September 1975 (age 51)
- Height: 1.70 m (5 ft 7 in)
- Weight: 73 kg (161 lb)

Sport
- Sport: Athletics
- Event: 110 m hurdles

Gabriel Randolph Burnett (born 20 September 1975) is a retired Barbadian athlete who specialised in the 110 metres hurdles. He represented his country at the 2000 Summer Olympics failing to qualify for the second round.

His personal best in the event is 13.62 seconds set in 2000.

== Competition record ==
Year	Competition	Venue	Position	Event	Notes
Representing Barbados
1993	CARIFTA Games (U20)	Fort-de-France, Martinique	2nd	110 m H	14.80
1993	CARIFTA Games (U20)	Fort-de-France, Martinique	3rd	400 m H	54.46
1993	Pan American Junior Championships	Winnipeg, Canada	6th	110 m H	14.89
1993	Pan American Junior Championships	Winnipeg, Canada	9th (h)	400 m H	60.80
1994	CARIFTA Games (U20)	Bridgetown, Barbados	1st	110 m H	14.68
1994	CARIFTA Games (U20)	Bridgetown, Barbados	2nd	400 m H	52.69
1994	CARIFTA Games (U20)	Bridgetown, Barbados	2nd	4x400 m	3:14.37
1994	Central American and Caribbean; Junior Championships (U20)	Port of Spain, Trinidad and Tobago	1st	110 m H	14.3
1994	World Junior Championships	Lisbon, Portugal	34th (h)	110 m H	14.62 (+1.4 m/s)
1994	World Junior Championships	Lisbon, Portugal	39th (h)	400 m H	55.91
1998	Central American and Caribbean Games	Maracaibo, Venezuela	11th (h)	200 m	21.52
1998	Central American and Caribbean Games	Maracaibo, Venezuela	5th	110 m H	13.95
1998	Commonwealth Games	Kuala Lumpur, Malaysia	9th (h)	110 m H	13.99
1998	Commonwealth Games	Kuala Lumpur, Malaysia	9th (h)	4x100 m	40.16
1999	Central American and Caribbean Championships	Bridgetown, Barbados	1st	4x100 m	39.75
1999	Universiade	Palma de Mallorca, Spain	17th (sf)	110 m H	14.15
1999	Pan American Games	Winnipeg, Canada	12th (h)	110 m H	13.95
2000	Olympic Games	Sydney, Australia	36th (h)	110 m H	14.23
2000	Olympic Games	Sydney, Australia	37th (h)	4x100 m	40.38
2001	Central American and Caribbean Championships	Guatemala City, Guatemala	2nd	110 m H	13.82
2001	World Championships	Edmonton, Canada	32nd (h)	110 m H	13.93
2002	Commonwealth Games	Manchester, United Kingdom	9th (h)	110 m H	14.08
2002	Central American and Caribbean Games	San Salvador, El Salvador	4th	110 m H	14.03 w (+2.6 m/s)
2002	Central American and Caribbean Games	San Salvador, El Salvador	5th	4x100 m	41.82
