= Steve Brown (hurdler) =

Trinidad and Tobago hurdler (born 1969)

Personal information
- Born: January 6, 1969 (age 57) Washington DC, United States

Sport
- Sport: Track and field
Medal record
Representing Trinidad and Tobago
Commonwealth Games
Silver medal – second place	1998 Kuala Lumpur	110m hurdles
Central American and Caribbean Games
Silver medal – second place	1998 Maracaibo	110m hurdles

Stephen Brown (born January 6, 1969) is a retired athlete from Trinidad and Tobago who specialized in the 110 metres hurdles. He represented his birth country United States until 1997.

Brown attended the Wake Forest University in Winston-Salem, North Carolina, where he was a member of both the college football and track teams. He won four Atlantic Coast Conference (ACC) track titles, including two in the 110 meter outdoor hurdles, and was a four-year starter in football, recording 122 career receptions. Brown was inducted into the Wake Forest Sports Hall of Fame in 2009, and was also named to the ACC's 50th Anniversary Men's Outdoor Track and Field team.

== Achievements ==
Year	Competition	Venue	Position	Event	Notes
Representing United States
1988	World Junior Championships	Sudbury, Canada	2nd	110 m h	13.73 w (wind: +3.0 m/s)
Representing Trinidad and Tobago
1998	Central American and Caribbean Games	Maracaibo, Venezuela	2nd	110 m h	13.56
1998	Central American and Caribbean Games	Maracaibo, Venezuela	4th	4 × 100 m relay	39.65
1998	Commonwealth Games	Kuala Lumpur, Malaysia	2nd	110 m h	13.48
1999	Pan American Games	Winnipeg, Canada	5th	110 m h	13.53
1999	Pan American Games	Winnipeg, Canada	5th	4 × 100 m relay	39.89
1999	World Championships	Seville, Spain	25th (qf)	110 m h	13.62
2000	Olympic Games	Sydney, Australia	30th (qf)	110 m h	14.12
