= David Janin =

French rugby union player (born 1977)

- Born: 9 May 1977 (age 49) Tremblay-en-France, France
- Height: 1.94 m (6 ft 4 in)
- Weight: 95 kg (209 lb)

Rugby union career
- Position: Wing
Senior career
Years	Team	Apps	(Points)
1995-2003	Bourgoin		
2003-2004	Perpigan		
2004-	CS Bourgoin-Jallieu		
International career
Years	Team	Apps	(Points)
2008	France	2	(0)
- Correct as of 2007-06-12

David Janin (born 9 May 1977 in Tremblay-en-France, France) is a French rugby union footballer.

He was selected for France in their 2008 Tour to Australia. His Test debut came against the Australia at Sydney on 28 June 2008.
