= Paul Sehzue =

Liberian hurdler

Personal information
- Nationality: Liberian
- Born: 10 May 1978 (age 48)

Sport
- Sport: Track and field
- Event: 110 metres hurdles

Paul Sehzue (born 10 May 1978) is a Liberian hurdler. He competed in the men's 110 metres hurdles at the 2000 Summer Olympics.
