= Sultan Tucker =

Liberian hurdler

Medal record

Men's athletics

Representing Liberia

African Championships
| Bronze medal – third place | 2002 Radès | 110 m hurdles |

Sultan Tucker (born 24 October 1978) is a Liberian athlete, specializing in the 110 metres hurdles.

Tucker competed for the Clemson Tigers track and field team, finishing 3rd in the 60 m hurdles at the 2000 NCAA Division I Indoor Track and Field Championships.

Tucker won a bronze in the 110 metres hurdles at the 2002 African Championships. He also represented Liberia at the World Championships in 2001 and 2005, the World Indoor Championships in 2003 and 2004 and the 2004 Olympic Games, but without reaching the final round.

His personal best time is 13.54 seconds, achieved in May 2004 in Saint-Martin.
