= Arlindo Pinheiro =

São Tomé and Príncipe hurdler (born 1971)

Arlindo Leocadio Pinheiro (27 March 1971) is a São Tomé and Principe athlete, who competed at the 2000 Summer Olympics in the Men's 110m hurdles he finished 6th in his heat and failed to advance. He also competed at the 1999 World Championships in Athletics and the 2003 World Championships in Athletics.
