= Gergely Palágyi =

Hungarian hurdler

Gergely Palágyi (born 19 February 1979) is a Hungarian hurdler who specializes in the 110 metres hurdles.

He finished fifth at the 1998 World Junior Championships, and also competed at the 2002 European Indoor Championships, the 2004 World Indoor Championships, and the 2005 Summer Universiade without reaching the final. He became Hungarian national champion in 1998, interfering with a long winning streak by Levente Csillag, and Hungarian indoor champion in 2003 and 2005.

His personal best time is 13.82 seconds, achieved in June 2005 in Budapest.

From March 2006 to March 2008 he was suspended by the IAAF for doping. He'd tested positive for the anabolic steroid stanozolol.
