= Stephen Jones (hurdler) =

Barbadian hurdler

Personal information
- Nationality: Barbadian
- Born: 25 July 1978 (age 47)

Sport
- Sport: Track and field
- Event: 110 metres hurdles

Stephen Jones (born 25 July 1978) is a Barbadian hurdler. He competed in the men's 110 metres hurdles at the 2004 Summer Olympics.

Jones competed for the Florida Gators track and field team in the NCAA, where he was an All-American in the 60 m hurdles.
