= Jean-Marc Grava =

French hurdler

Jean-Marc Grava (born 2 December 1971 in Saint-Denis, France) is a French track and field athlete who specialises in the 110 meter hurdles. Grava competed in the 2000 Summer Olympics.
