= Ralf Leberer =

German hurdler

Personal information
- Nationality: German
- Born: 26 October 1973 (age 52) Tettnang, West Germany

Sport
- Sport: Track and field
- Event: 110 metres hurdles

Ralf Leberer (born 26 October 1973) is a German hurdler. He competed in the men's 110 metres hurdles at the 2000 Summer Olympics.
