= Terrence Trammell =

American hurdler (born 1978)

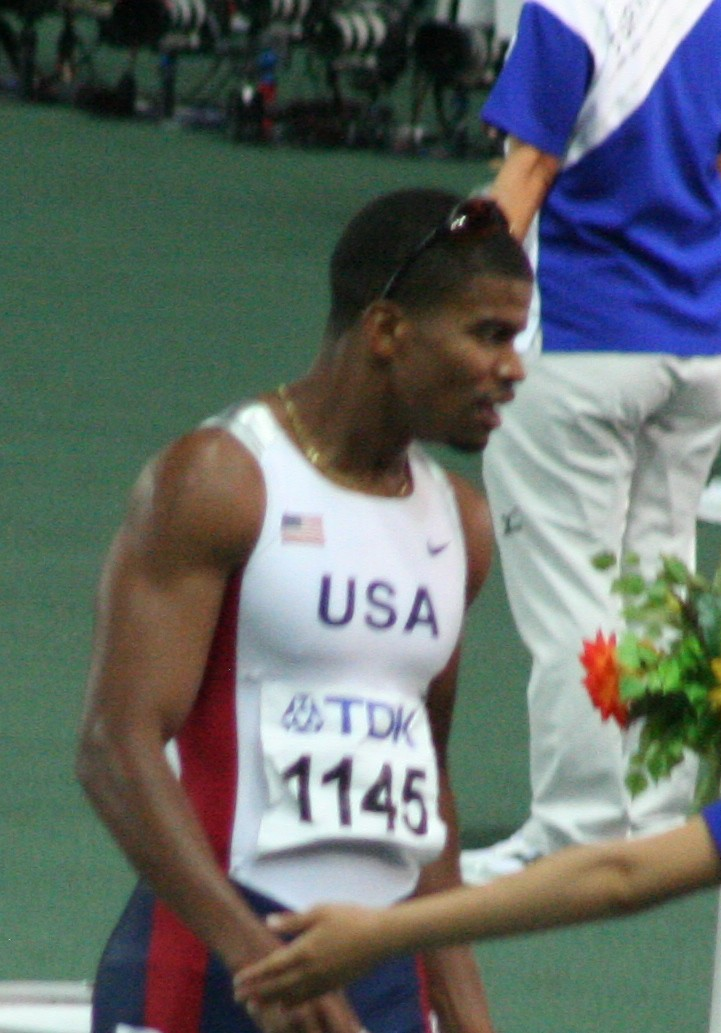
- Trammell at the 2007 World Championships

Personal information
- Born: November 23, 1978 (age 47) Atlanta, Georgia, U.S.
Medal record
Men's athletics
Representing the United States
Olympic Games
Silver medal – second place	2000 Sydney	110 m hurdles
Silver medal – second place	2004 Athens	110 m hurdles
World Championships
Silver medal – second place	2003 Paris	110 m hurdles
Silver medal – second place	2007 Osaka	110 m hurdles
Silver medal – second place	2009 Berlin	110 m hurdles
World Indoor Championships
Gold medal – first place	2001 Lisbon	60 m hurdles
Gold medal – first place	2006 Moscow	60 m hurdles
Bronze medal – third place	2006 Moscow	60 m
Silver medal – second place	2010 Doha	60 m hurdles
Universiade
Gold medal – first place	1999 Palma de Mallorca	110 m hurdles
Gold medal – first place	1999 Palma de Mallorca	4 × 100 m relay

Terrence Trammell (born November 23, 1978) is a retired American track and field athlete who was the silver medalist for the 110 meter hurdles at the 2000 and 2004 Summer Olympics, and three time silver medalist for the World Championships.

He was born to Leonard (Deceased)2010 and Ann Trammell in Atlanta, Georgia. The 1997 Track & Field News Male High School Athlete of the Year, he attended the University of South Carolina where he trained under Curtis Frye. His main training partner until 2002 was Olympic gold medalist Allen Johnson. He was the 1999-2000 NCAA Champion Indoors and Outdoors.

He qualified for the 2008 Beijing Olympics but had to pull out of the competition after injuring his hamstring in the preliminary rounds. He retired in 2015.

He trained in Atlanta with his high school (Southwest Dekalb High School) coach Napoleon Cobb.

Trammell is a member of Omega Psi Phi fraternity.

He currently serves as an assistant track and field coach at Pace Academy in Atlanta.

In 2021 he was elected into the National Track and Field Hall of Fame.

== Personal bests ==
Event	Performance	Location	Date
100 m	10.04	Durham	June 2, 2000
200 m	20.74	Gainesville	January 1, 1998
110 m hurdles	12.95	New York	June 2, 2007

== Achievements ==
Year	Competition	Venue	Position	Event	Notes
1998	1998 NCAA Division I Outdoor Track and Field Championships	Buffalo, New York	2nd	110 m hurdles	
1999	1999 NCAA Division I Outdoor Track and Field Championships	Indianapolis, Indiana	1st	110 m hurdles	
1999	1999 NCAA Division I Outdoor Track and Field Championships	Indianapolis, Indiana	1st	4 × 100 m relay	
1999	World University Games	Palma de Mallorca, Spain	1st	110 m hurdles	13.44 (wind: -0.1 m/s)
1999	World University Games	Palma de Mallorca, Spain	1st	4 × 100 m relay	38.55
2000	2000 NCAA Division I Outdoor Track and Field Championships	Fayetteville, Arkansas	1st	60 m	
2000	2000 NCAA Division I Outdoor Track and Field Championships	Fayetteville, Arkansas	1st	60 m hurdles	
2000	2000 NCAA Division I Outdoor Track and Field Championships	Fayetteville, Arkansas	1st	110 m hurdles	
2000	Summer Olympics	Sydney, Australia	2nd	110 m hurdles	13.16 (wind: +0.6 m/s)
2001	World Indoor Championships	Lisbon, Portugal	1st	60 m hurdles	7.51
2001	IAAF Grand Prix Final	Melbourne, Australia	7th	110 m hurdles	14.17 (wind: -1.7 m/s)
2002	United States Indoor Championships	New York City, New York	1st	60 m	
2002	NACAC U-25 Championships	San Antonio, Texas, United States	1st	110 m hurdles	13.45 (wind: +1.3 m/s)
2003	World Championships	Paris, France	2nd	110 m hurdles	13.20 (wind: +0.3 m/s)
2003	IAAF World Athletics Final	Monaco	2nd	110 m hurdles	13.17 (wind: -1.5 m/s)
2004	U.S. Olympic Team Trials	Sacramento, California	1st	110 m hurdles	
2004	Summer Olympics	Athens, Greece	2nd	110 m hurdles	13.18 (wind: +0.3 m/s)
2005	World Championships	Helsinki, Finland	5th	110 m hurdles	13.20 (wind: -0.2 m/s)
2005	IAAF World Athletics Final	Monaco	3rd	110 m hurdles	13.17 (wind: -1.4 m/s)
2006	World Indoor Championships	Moscow, Russia	1st	60 m hurdles	7.43
2006	World Indoor Championships	Moscow, Russia	3rd	60 m	6.54
2007	United States Outdoor Championships	Eugene, Oregon	1st	110 m hurdles	
2007	World Championships	Osaka, Japan	2nd	110 m hurdles	12.99 (wind: +1.7 m/s)
2008	U.S. Olympic Trials	Eugene, Oregon	2nd	110 m hurdles	
2009	United States Indoor Championships	Boston, Massachusetts	1st	60 m hurdles	
2010	World Indoor Championships	Doha, Qatar	2nd	60 m hurdles	7.36

=== Track records ===
As of 23 November 2024, Trammell holds the following track records for 110 metres hurdles.

Location	Time	Windspeed m/s	Date
Athens, GA.	13.29	0.0	May 16, 1999
Indianapolis, Ind.	13.08	+0.5	June 24, 2007

Awards
Preceded by Obea Moore	Track & Field News High School Boys Athlete of the Year; 1997	Succeeded by Greg Yeldell
