= Allen Johnson =

American hurdler

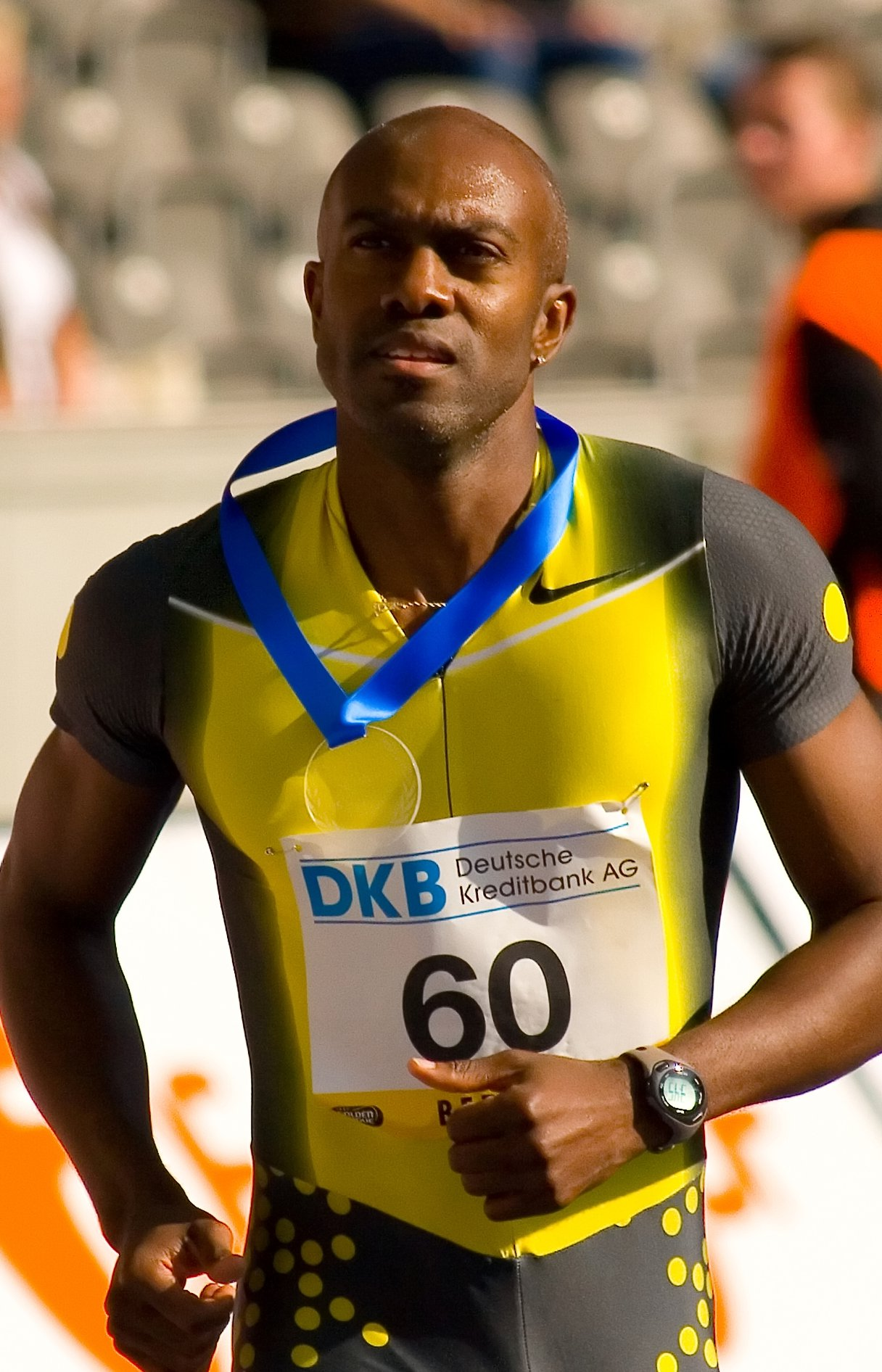
- Johnson at 2007 ISTAF Berlin

Personal information
- Born: March 1, 1971 (age 55) Washington, D.C., U.S.
- Height: 5 ft 10 in (178 cm)
- Weight: 165 lb (75 kg)

Sport
- Sport: Sprint
- Event: Hurdling
- College team: North Carolina Tar Heels
Medal record
Men's athletics
Representing the United States
Olympic Games
| Gold medal – first place | 1996 Atlanta | 110 m hurdles |
World Championships
| Gold medal – first place | 1995 Gothenburg | 110 m hurdles |
| Gold medal – first place | 1997 Athens | 110 m hurdles |
| Gold medal – first place | 2001 Edmonton | 110 m hurdles |
| Gold medal – first place | 2003 Paris | 110 m hurdles |
| Bronze medal – third place | 2005 Helsinki | 110 m hurdles |
World Indoor Championships
| Gold medal – first place | 1995 Barcelona | 60 m hurdles |
| Gold medal – first place | 2003 Birmingham | 60 m hurdles |
| Gold medal – first place | 2004 Budapest | 60 m hurdles |
| Silver medal – second place | 2008 Valencia | 60 m hurdles |
IAAF World Cup
| Gold medal – first place | 2006 Athens | 110 m hurdles |
| Silver medal – second place | 1994 London | 110 m hurdles |
| Silver medal – second place | 2002 Madrid | 110 m hurdles |

Allen Kenneth Johnson (born March 1, 1971) is an American former hurdling athlete who won the gold medal in the 110 metre hurdles at the 1996 Summer Olympics in Atlanta, Georgia. He is also a four-time world champion.

Born in Washington, D.C., an all-round athlete, Johnson attended University of North Carolina at Chapel Hill and excelled at high jump, long jump and decathlon as well as hurdles. He was the 1992 NCAA Indoor Champion for 55 meter hurdles but did not win the outdoor championship.

== Career ==
Johnson was troubled by injury in 2000 but still made the final at the 2000 Summer Olympics in Sydney, Australia, just missing out on adding to his medal collection by finishing fourth.

2003 in the Stade de France, saw Johnson win his fourth IAAF World Championships in Athletics 110 m hurdles title when he beat Terrence Trammell into second to overtake the three world championship gold medals that Greg Foster had won at the event.

At the 2004 Summer Olympics he tripped over a hurdle in the 2nd preliminary round and was unable to finish the race and reach the final. He was however ranked world's number 1 throughout 2004's season.

Johnson was trained by Curtis Frye, at the University of South Carolina where he served as a volunteer assistant coach. Formerly, the sprint and hurdles coach at the United States Air Force Academy in Colorado Springs, CO, Johnson is now the Assistant Head Coach at the North Carolina State University under Rollie Geiger.

His personal best is 12.92 seconds, only 0.01 seconds short of the then-world record held by Colin Jackson. Johnson has legally finished 11 races in less than 13 seconds, which was the most all time until Grant Holloway secured 12 on September 6, 2024. His 12.96 (+0.4) set while winning the 2006 IAAF World Cup at age 35, is the Masters M35 World Record. Johnson officially retired in July 2010, at the age of 39. Daughter, Tristine Johnson, competes as a 2014 senior at his alma mater University of North Carolina.

== Achievements ==
(110 Meter Hurdles unless stated)

- 1994
  - 1994 IAAF World Cup – London, England
    - Silver
- 1995
  - 1995 World Championships in Athletics – Gothenburg, Sweden
    - Gold
  - 1995 IAAF World Indoor Championships – Barcelona, Spain
    - 60 Meter Hurdles, Gold
- 1996
  - 1996 Summer Olympics – Atlanta, Georgia
    - Gold, Olympic record
- 1997
  - 1997 World Championships in Athletics – Athens, Greece
    - Gold
- 1998
  - 1998 Goodwill Games – Uniondale, New York
    - Silver
- 2000
  - 2000 Summer Olympics – Sydney, Australia
- 2001
  - 2001 World Championships in Athletics – Edmonton, Alberta, Canada
    - Gold
  - Goodwill Games – Brisbane, Australia
    - Gold
- 2002
  - 2002 IAAF World Cup – Madrid, Spain
    - Silver
- 2003
  - 2003 World Championships in Athletics – Paris, France
    - Gold
  - 2003 IAAF World Indoor Championships – Birmingham, England
    - 60 Meter Hurdles, Gold
- 2004
  - 2004 IAAF World Indoor Championships – Budapest, Hungary
    - 60 Meter Hurdles, Gold
- 2005
  - World Championships in Athletics – Helsinki, Finland
    - Bronze
- 2006
  - IAAF World Cup – Athens, Greece
    - 110 Meter Hurdles, Gold

=== Track records ===
As of 11 September 2024, Johnson holds the following track records for 110 metres hurdles.

| Location | Time | Windspeed m/s | Date |
|---|---|---|---|
| Atlanta, GA | 12.92 | +0.9 | 23/06/1996 |
| Brisbane | 13.16 | –0.4 | 05/09/2001 |
| Carson | 12.99 | +0.2 | 24/06/2005 |
| Chania | 13.22 | +1.5 | 14/06/2000 |
| Chapel Hill | 13.19 | 0.0 | 17/05/1997 |
| Clemson, SC | 13.22 | +0.1 | 16/05/1998 |
| Cologne | 12.98 | +0.2 | 18/08/1995 |
| Edmonton | 13.04 | –0.3 | 09/08/2001 |
| Fort-de-France | 13.04 | +1.7 | 27/04/2002 |
| Gothenburg | 13.00 | –0.1 | 12/08/1995 |
| Hermosillo | 13.39 | +1.3 | 21/05/2005 |
| Mexico City | 13.08 | –0.2 | 22/05/2004 |
| Palo Alto, CA | 13.08 | –0.1 | 23/06/2002 |
| Portland | 13.27 | +0.5 | 25/06/2000 |
| Raleigh, NC | 13.22 | –0.5 | 12/06/1999 |
| Rome | 13.01 | +0.8 | 07/07/1999 |
| Sacramento, CA | 12.97 | +1.5 | 23/07/2000 |

Sporting positions
| Preceded by (United Kingdom) Colin Jackson | Men's 110 m Hurdles Best Year Performance; 1995 — 1998 | Succeeded by (United States) Mark Crear |
| Preceded by (United States) Mark Crear | Men's 110 m Hurdles Best Year Performance; 2000 — 2001 | Succeeded by (Cuba) Anier García |
| Preceded by (Cuba) Anier García | Men's 110 m Hurdles Best Year Performance; 2003 | Succeeded by (China) Liu Xiang |
