= Andrea Giaconi =

Italian hurdler (born 1974)

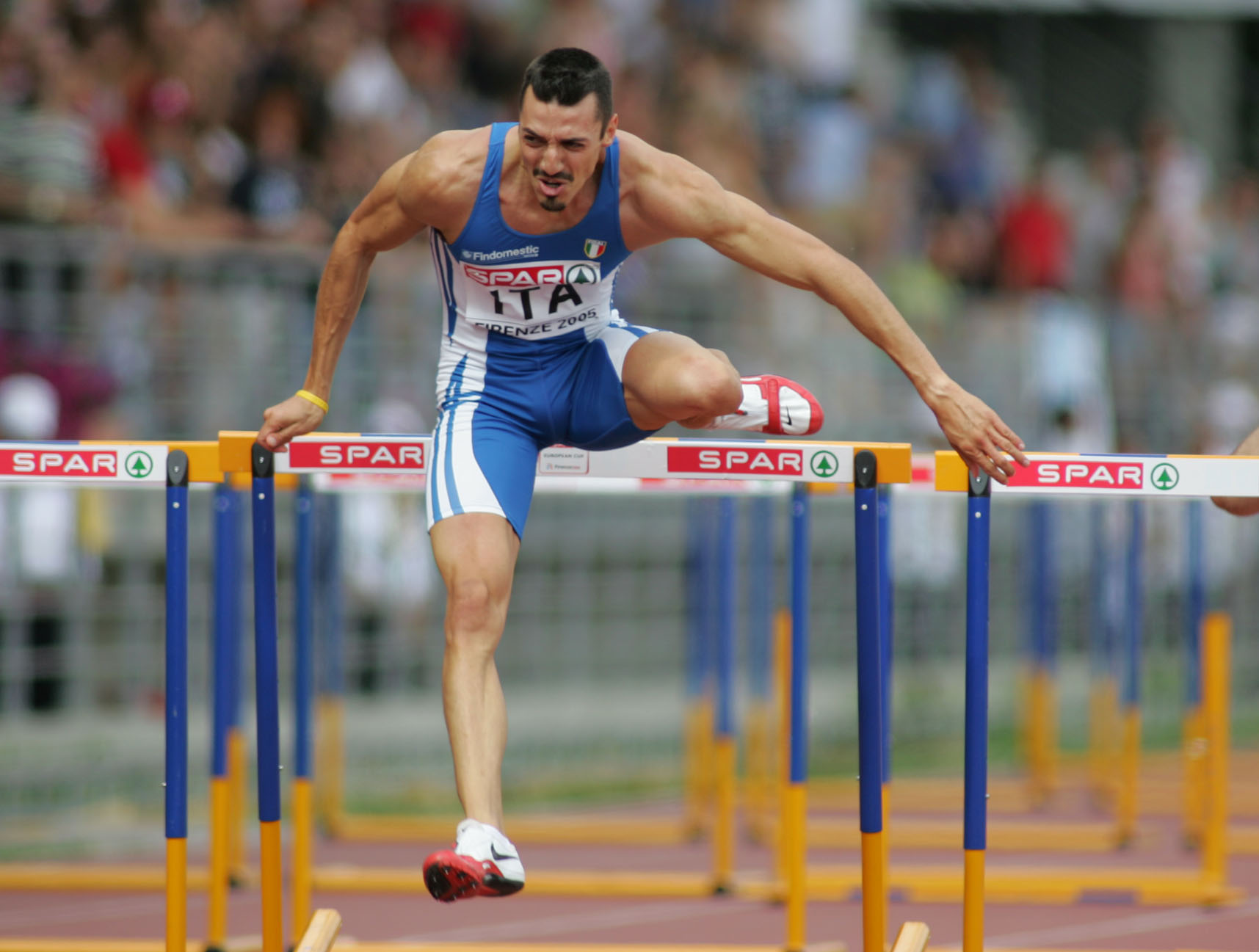

Personal information
- Nationality: Italy
- Born: 11 April 1974 (age 52) Reggio Emilia
- Height: 1.83 m (6 ft 0 in)
- Weight: 72 kg (159 lb)

Sport
- Sport: Athletics
- Event: 110 metres hurdles
Medal record
Event	1st	2nd	3rd
Mediterranean Games	0	1	0
European Cup	0	0	3
European Indoor Cup	1	0	1
Total	1	1	4
Mediterranean Games
Silver medal – second place	2005 Almería	110 m hurdles
European Cup
Bronze medal – third place	2002 Annecy	110 m hurdles
Bronze medal – third place	2003 Florence	110 m hurdles
Bronze medal – third place	2005 Florence	110 m hurdles
European Indoor Cup
Gold medal – first place	2004 Leipzig	60 m hs

Andrea Giaconi (born 11 April 1974) is an Italian hurdler.

== Biography ==
He won the silver medal at the 2005 Mediterranean Games. He also participated at the World Athletics Championships in 1999 and 2003, the World Athletics Indoor Championships in 2004 and 2006 and the 2000 Olympic Games without reaching the final.

His personal best time is 13.35 seconds, achieved in June 2002 in Annecy. This was an Italian record till May 2012, when Emanuele Abate beat it.

== National titles ==
He has won 5 times the individual national championship.

- 3 wins in the 110 metres hurdles (1999, 2005, 2006)
- 2 wins in the 60 metres hurdles indoor (2005, 2006)

== See also ==
- Italian all-time lists - 110 metres hurdles
