= Evgeny Pechonkin =

Evgeny Gennadyevich Pechonkin (Russian: Евгений Геннадьевич Печёнкин, born 9 October 1973 in Krasnodar) is a Russian bobsledder and former track and field athlete who has switched to his current sport in 2005. As a sprint hurdler, he represented Russia at the Olympic Games in 1996, 2000 and 2004. He was the world junior champion in 1992 and competed at the World Championships in Athletics in 1993 and 2001.

His best Bobsleigh World Cup finish was second in the four-man event at Cortina d'Ampezzo in January 2008. Pechonkin's best finish at the FIBT World Championships was tenth in the four-man event at Altenberg in 2008.

He was banned from athletics for two years after failing a doping test in 2002 for the banned substance norandrosterone. This resulted in the annulling of his Russian national indoor title that year and a bronze medal at the 2002 European Athletics Indoor Championships.

He was previously married to former hurdler Yuliya Pechonkina.

== See also ==
- List of doping cases in athletics
