= Balázs Kovács (hurdler) =

Hungarian hurdler

Balázs Kovács (born 14 June 1977) is a retired Hungarian hurdler who specializes in the 110 metres hurdles.

He was born in Ajka. He competed at the 2000 Olympic Games, the 2001 World Indoor Championships and the 2002 European Indoor Championships without reaching the final. He became Hungarian national champion in 2003, and Hungarian indoor champion in 1999, 2000, 2001, 2002 and 2006.

His personal best time is 13.65 seconds, achieved in June 2004 in Budapest.
