= Elmar Lichtenegger =

Austrian hurdler (born 1974)

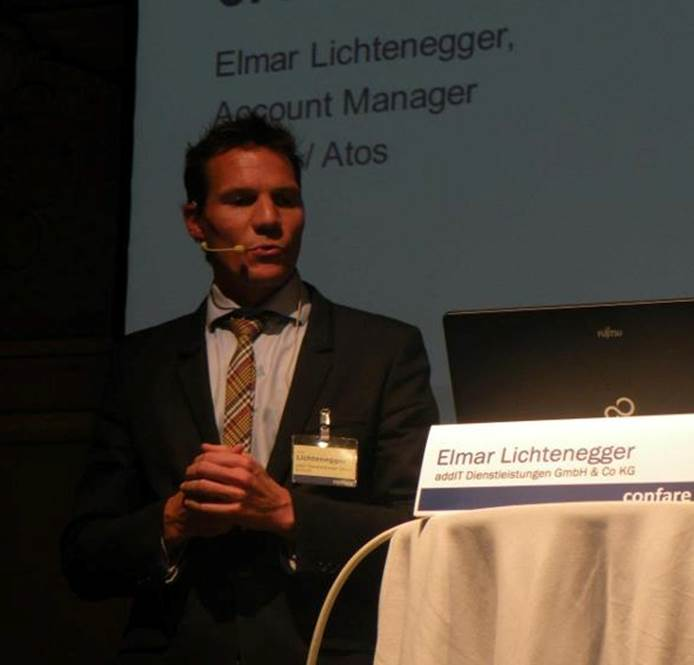
- Lichtenegger in 2013

Personal information
- Born: 25 May 1974 (age 52) Klagenfurt
- Height: 186 cm (6 ft 1 in)
- Weight: 82 kg (181 lb)
Medal record
Men's athletics
Representing Austria
Summer Universiade
Silver medal – second place	2001 Beijing	110 m hurdles
European Indoor Championships
Silver medal – second place	2002 Vienna	60 m hurdles

Elmar Lichtenegger (born 25 May 1974 in Klagenfurt) is an Austrian hurdler.

His personal best time is 13.33 seconds, achieved in June 1999 in Athens.

Lichtenegger competed at the 1996 Summer Olympics and 2000 Summer Olympics.

Since 2003 he has been a member of the National Council of Austria, originally for the Freedom Party of Austria (FPÖ). In 2006 he joined the Alliance for the Future of Austria (BZÖ).

On 27 August 2008 Lichtenegger received a lifetime ban from international athletics competition due to his second positive test for the banned substance nandrolone.

== Achievements ==
Year	Competition	Venue	Position	Notes
Representing Austria
1997	Universiade	Catania, Italy	5th	110 m hurdles
1999	World Indoor Championships	Maebashi, Japan	7th	60 m hurdles
2000	European Indoor Championships	Ghent, Belgium	4th	60 m hurdles
2001	World Indoor Championships	Lisbon, Portugal	6th	60 m hurdles
2001	Universiade	Beijing, China	2nd	110 m hurdles
2002	European Indoor Championships	Vienna, Austria	2nd	60 m hurdles
