= 2006 IAAF World Indoor Championships – Men's 60 metres hurdles =

The Men's 60 metres hurdles event at the 2006 IAAF World Indoor Championships was held on March 11.

== Medalists ==
Gold	Silver	Bronze
Terrence Trammell; United States	Dayron Robles; Cuba	Dominique Arnold; United States

== Results ==
=== Heats ===
First 4 of each heat (Q) and next 4 fastest (q) qualified for the semifinals.

Rank	Heat	Name	Nationality	Time	Notes
1	3	Dayron Robles	Cuba	7.55	Q, PB
2	2	Maurice Wignall	Jamaica	7.58	Q
3	2	Paulo Villar	Colombia	7.63	Q, NR
4	4	Terrence Trammell	United States	7.64	Q
5	1	Thomas Blaschek	Germany	7.65	Q
6	4	Yoel Hernández	Cuba	7.66	Q, SB
6	5	Igor Peremota	Russia	7.66	Q
8	3	Dominique Arnold	United States	7.67	Q
8	4	Sergiy Demidyuk	Ukraine	7.67	Q
8	5	Shi Dongpeng	China	7.67	Q, PB
11	2	Stanislavs Olijars	Latvia	7.70	Q, SB
12	2	Evgeniy Borisov	Russia	7.70	Q
13	1	Elmar Lichtenegger	Austria	7.71	Q
13	4	Gregory Sedoc	Netherlands	7.71	Q
15	3	Matheus Facho Inocêncio	Brazil	7.72	Q
16	3	Chris Pinnock	Jamaica	7.72	Q, SB
17	3	Mike Fenner	Germany	7.76	q
18	1	Olli Talsi	Finland	7.77	Q
18	2	Marcel van der Westen	Netherlands	7.77	q
20	4	Dudley Dorival	Haiti	7.80	q
21	5	Stanislav Sajdok	Czech Republic	7.81	Q
22	5	Andrea Giaconi	Italy	7.81	Q
23	4	Masato Naito	Japan	7.82	q, SB
24	4	Cédric Lavanne	France	7.85	
25	1	Ivan Bitzi	Switzerland	7.86	Q
25	3	Alexandru Mihailescu	Romania	7.86	
25	5	David Ilariani	Georgia	7.86	SB
28	2	Jared MacLeod	Canada	7.89	
29	5	Redelén dos Santos	Brazil	7.93	
30	2	Miroslav Novaković	Serbia and Montenegro	8.05	
31	3	Abdallah Mohamed	Comoros	8.15	SB
32	5	Avele Tanielu	Samoa	8.64	NR
33	1	Anthony De Sevelinges	Monaco	8.90	
	1	Elton Bitincka	Albania	DNS	
	1	Wafi Shaddad Hasan Ali	Yemen	DNS	

=== Semifinals ===
First 2 of each semifinal (Q) and next 2 fastest (q) qualified for the final.

Rank	Heat	Name	Nationality	Time	Notes
1	3	Dominique Arnold	United States	7.55	Q
2	3	Dayron Robles	Cuba	7.56	Q
3	2	Terrence Trammell	United States	7.57	Q
3	3	Stanislavs Olijars	Latvia	7.57	q, SB
5	1	Maurice Wignall	Jamaica	7.58	Q
5	2	Thomas Blaschek	Germany	7.58	Q, PB
7	3	Paulo Villar	Colombia	7.61	q, NR
8	2	Shi Dongpeng	China	7.63	PB
9	1	Yoel Hernández	Cuba	7.64	Q
10	3	Matheus Facho Inocêncio	Brazil	7.67	PB
11	2	Elmar Lichtenegger	Austria	7.71	
12	1	Gregory Sedoc	Netherlands	7.73	
13	2	Stanislav Sajdok	Czech Republic	7.74	
13	3	Evgeniy Borisov	Russia	7.74	
15	1	Olli Talsi	Finland	7.76	
16	3	Chris Pinnock	Jamaica	7.78	
17	2	Marcel van der Westen	Netherlands	7.80	
18	2	Andrea Giaconi	Italy	7.81	
19	3	Masato Naito	Japan	7.82	SB
20	1	Ivan Bitzi	Switzerland	7.85	
21	2	Dudley Dorival	Haiti	7.94	
22	1	Igor Peremota	Russia	7.96	
23	1	Sergiy Demidyuk	Ukraine	8.03	
	1	Mike Fenner	Germany	DNF	

=== Final ===
Rank	Lane	Name	Nationality	Time	React	Notes
1st place, gold medalist(s)	6	Terrence Trammell	United States	7.43	0.124	WL
2nd place, silver medalist(s)	5	Dayron Robles	Cuba	7.46	0.131	PB
3rd place, bronze medalist(s)	3	Dominique Arnold	United States	7.52	0.156	
4	4	Maurice Wignall	Jamaica	7.52	0.133	SB
5	1	Stanislavs Olijars	Latvia	7.52	0.133	SB
6	2	Thomas Blaschek	Germany	7.57	0.164	PB
7	7	Paulo Villar	Colombia	7.61	0.186	NR
8	8	Yoel Hernández	Cuba	7.62	0.134	SB
