= 2005 European Athletics Indoor Championships – Men's 60 metres hurdles =

The Men's 60 metres hurdles event at the 2005 European Athletics Indoor Championships was held on March 5–6.

== Medalists ==
Gold	Silver	Bronze
Ladji Doucouré; France	Felipe Vivancos; Spain	Robert Kronberg; Sweden

== Results ==
=== Heats ===
First 3 of each heat (Q) and the next 4 fastest (q) qualified for the semifinals.

Rank	Heat	Name	Nationality	Time	Notes
1	3	Stanislavs Olijars	Latvia	7.59	Q
2	4	Elmar Lichtenegger	Austria	7.62	Q
3	4	Philip Nossmy	Sweden	7.63	Q, =PB
4	1	Ladji Doucouré	France	7.64	Q
5	4	Thomas Blaschek	Germany	7.66	Q
6	4	Damien Greaves	Great Britain	7.68	q, =PB
7	2	Allan Scott	Great Britain	7.69	Q
8	1	Robert Kronberg	Sweden	7.70	Q
9	3	Sébastien Denis	France	7.71	Q
10	1	Andrea Giaconi	Italy	7.72	Q
10	3	Ivan Bitzi	Switzerland	7.72	Q
12	2	Felipe Vivancos	Spain	7.73	Q
13	3	David Ilariani	Georgia	7.77	q, PB
14	1	Sergey Demidyuk	Ukraine	7.79	q
14	2	Cédric Lavanne	France	7.79	Q
16	1	Matti Niemi	Finland	7.81	q
17	2	Alexandru Mihailescu	Romania	7.82	
18	2	Peter Coghlan	Ireland	7.82	SB
19	3	Igor Peremota	Russia	7.85	
20	4	Jurica Grabušić	Croatia	7.86	
21	2	Marcel van der Westen	Netherlands	7.87	
22	1	Andreas Kundert	Switzerland	7.88	
23	4	Stanislav Sajdok	Czech Republic	7.89	
24	1	Andy Turner	Great Britain	7.90	
24	3	Andrey Shalonka	Belarus	7.90	
26	2	Alexandros Theofanov	Greece	7.91	
27	3	Juha Sonck	Finland	7.92	
28	2	Elton Bitincka	Albania	8.15	
29	4	Gregory Sedoc	Netherlands	9.38	

=== Semifinals ===
First 4 of each semifinals qualified directly (Q) for the final.

Rank	Heat	Name	Nationality	Time	Notes
1	2	Ladji Doucouré	France	7.49	Q
2	1	Thomas Blaschek	Germany	7.63	Q
3	1	Stanislavs Olijars	Latvia	7.64	Q
4	2	Elmar Lichtenegger	Austria	7.65	Q
5	1	Philip Nossmy	Sweden	7.66	Q
6	1	Felipe Vivancos	Spain	7.68	Q
7	2	Robert Kronberg	Sweden	7.69	Q
8	2	Sébastien Denis	France	7.69	Q
9	1	Allan Scott	Great Britain	7.74	
10	1	Cédric Lavanne	France	7.74	
11	2	Damien Greaves	Great Britain	7.75	
12	2	Andrea Giaconi	Italy	7.76	
13	2	Sergey Demidyuk	Ukraine	7.80	
14	2	David Ilariani	Georgia	7.81	
15	1	Ivan Bitzi	Switzerland	7.89	
	1	Matti Niemi	Finland	DQ	

=== Final ===
Rank	Lane	Name	Nationality	Time	React	Notes
1st place, gold medalist(s)	6	Ladji Doucouré	France	7.50	0.181	
2nd place, silver medalist(s)	7	Felipe Vivancos	Spain	7.61	0.136	
3rd place, bronze medalist(s)	8	Robert Kronberg	Sweden	7.65	0.135	
4	1	Philip Nossmy	Sweden	7.65	0.148	
5	5	Thomas Blaschek	Germany	7.68	0.165	F1
	3	Elmar Lichtenegger	Austria	DQ		F2
	4	Stanislavs Olijars	Latvia	DQ		F3
	2	Sébastien Denis	France	DQ		F4
