= 2007 World Championships in Athletics – Men's 110 metres hurdles =

2007 athletic competition in Osaka, Japan

The 110 metres hurdles at the 2007 World Championships in Athletics was held at the Nagai Stadium in Osaka, Japan from August 29 to August 31.

== Medalists ==
Gold	Liu Xiang; PR China (CHN)
Silver	Terrence Trammell; United States (USA)
Bronze	David Payne; United States (USA)

== Records ==
World record	Liu Xiang (CHN)	12.88	Lausanne, Switzerland	11 July 2006
Championship record	Colin Jackson (GBR)	12.91	Stuttgart, Germany	20 August 1993
World leading	Liu Xiang (CHN)	12.92	New York City, United States	2 June 2007

== Schedule ==
Date	Time	Round
29 August 2007	11:40	Heats
30 August 2007	21:30	Semi-finals
31 August 2007	22:20	Final

== Results ==
=== Heats ===
Qualification: First 3 in each heat (Q) and the next 9 fastest (q) advance to the semi-finals.

Rank	Heat	Name	Nationality	Time	Notes
1	5	Shi Dongpeng	China	13.22	Q, PB
2	5	David Payne	United States	13.27	Q
3	5	Andy Turner	Great Britain	13.27	Q, PB
4	2	Liu Xiang	China	13.36	Q
5	3	Staņislavs Olijars	Latvia	13.38	Q, SB
6	2	Jackson Quiñónez	Spain	13.39	Q
7	1	Terrence Trammell	United States	13.40	Q
8	4	Dayron Robles	Cuba	13.41	Q
9	3	Yoel Hernández	Cuba	13.46	Q
10	2	Maurice Wignall	Jamaica	13.47	Q, SB
11	1	Gregory Sedoc	Netherlands	13.48	Q
12	1	Robert Kronberg	Sweden	13.51	Q, SB
13	2	Serhiy Demydyuk	Ukraine	13.53	q
14	3	Masato Naito	Japan	13.54	Q
15	1	Xing Yanan	China	13.56	q
16	1	Thomas Blaschek	Germany	13.56	q
17	2	Anselmo da Silva	Brazil	13.58	q
18	4	Ladji Doucouré	France	13.61	Q
19	4	Tasuku Tanonaka	Japan	13.61	Q
20	4	Adrien Deghelt	Belgium	13.61	q
21	4	Jared MacLeod	Canada	13.61	q
22	3	Ryan Brathwaite	Barbados	13.62	q
23	5	Dudley Dorival	Haiti	13.63	q, SB
24	3	David Oliver	United States	13.66	q
25	3	Mohamed Issa Al-Thawadi	Qatar	13.67	
26	5	Andreas Kundert	Switzerland	13.68	
27	5	Shamar Sands	Bahamas	13.72	
28	1	Konstadinos Douvalidis	Greece	13.74	
29	5	Damjan Zlatnar	Slovenia	13.77	
30	2	Selim Nurudeen	Nigeria	13.78	
31	4	Shaun Bownes	South Africa	13.81	
32	4	David Ilariani	Georgia	13.82	
33	3	Joseph-Berlioz Randriamihaja	Madagascar	13.83	
34	4	Igor Peremota	Russia	13.84	
34	5	Bano Traoré	France	13.84	
36	1	Éder Antonio Souza	Brazil	13.86	
37	2	Kenji Yahata	Japan	13.92	
38	1	Tarmo Jallai	Estonia	14.16	SB
39	2	Abdul Hakeem Abdul Halim	Singapore	14.94	
	3	Felipe Vivancos	Spain		DSQ

=== Semi-finals ===
Qualification: First 2 in each semi-final (Q) and the next 2 fastest (q) advance to the final.

Rank	Heat	Name	Nationality	Time	Notes
1	1	David Payne	United States	13.19	Q
2	3	Dayron Robles	Cuba	13.21	Q
3	2	Terrence Trammell	United States	13.23	Q
4	1	Shi Dongpeng	China	13.24	Q
5	3	Liu Xiang	China	13.25	Q
6	1	Maurice Wignall	Jamaica	13.29	q, SB
7	1	Jackson Quiñónez	Spain	13.33	q, NR
8	2	Serhiy Demydyuk	Ukraine	13.35	Q
9	2	Ladji Doucouré	France	13.36	
10	2	Yoel Hernández	Cuba	13.37	
11	3	Andy Turner	Great Britain	13.38	
12	3	David Oliver	United States	13.42	
13	1	Anselmo da Silva	Brazil	13.53	
14	1	Robert Kronberg	Sweden	13.58	
14	3	Gregory Sedoc	Netherlands	13.58	
14	3	Masato Naito	Japan	13.58	
17	2	Xing Yanan	China	13.59	
18	2	Tasuku Tanonaka	Japan	13.62	
19	3	Jared MacLeod	Canada	13.66	
20	1	Adrien Deghelt	Belgium	13.70	
21	3	Thomas Blaschek	Germany	13.77	
22	2	Staņislavs Olijars	Latvia	13.78	
23	1	Dudley Dorival	Haiti	13.82	
24	2	Ryan Brathwaite	Barbados	13.87	

=== Final ===
Rank	Name	Nationality	Time	Notes
1st place, gold medalist(s)	Liu Xiang	China	12.95	
2nd place, silver medalist(s)	Terrence Trammell	United States	12.99	
3rd place, bronze medalist(s)	David Payne	United States	13.02	PB
4	Dayron Robles	Cuba	13.15	
5	Shi Dongpeng	China	13.19	PB
6	Serhiy Demydyuk	Ukraine	13.22	NR
7	Jackson Quiñónez	Spain	13.33	NR
8	Maurice Wignall	Jamaica	13.39	
