= Athletics at the 2008 Summer Olympics – Men's 110 metres hurdles =

Men's 110 metres hurdles at the Games of the XXIX Olympiad
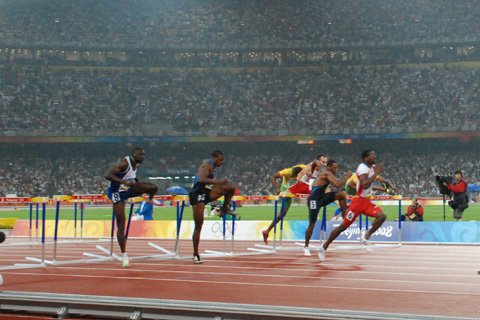
- Dayron Robles of Cuba winning the 110 meters hurdles
- Venue: Beijing National Stadium
- Dates: August 18 (heats); August 20 (semifinals); August 21 (final)
- Competitors: 43 from 33 nations
- Winning time: 12.93

Medalists
1st place, gold medalist(s)		Dayron Robles	Cuba
2nd place, silver medalist(s)		David Payne	United States
3rd place, bronze medalist(s)		David Oliver	United States

The men's 110 metres hurdles at the 2008 Summer Olympics took place on 18–21 August at the Beijing National Stadium. Forty-two athletes from 32 nations competed. The event was won by Dayron Robles of Cuba, the nation's second gold medal in the high hurdles.

== Summary ==
Dayron Robles was the clear favorite, having set the world record just two months earlier. He didn't disappoint leading the semi-final round by almost a tenth of a second, a huge margin on this level. In the final, Robles was out first, clearly ahead by the first hurdle; he pulled away to a clear victory. The two Americans, David Payne and David Oliver were clearly separating from the others for second place, Payne slightly ahead of Oliver, with only Ladji Doucouré within a stride of Oliver. Doucouré looked to be faster, and on the final dash to the finish line was clearly gaining on Oliver, who himself was gaining on Payne to make the finish much closer. Robles more than doubled his margin from the semifinal round, almost a quarter of a second ahead of Payne.

== Background ==
This was the 26th appearance of the event, which is one of 12 athletics events to have been held at every Summer Olympics. Four finalists from 2004 returned: gold medalist Liu Xiang of China, silver medalist Terrence Trammell of the United States, fourth-place finisher Maurice Wignall of Jamaica, and eighth-place finisher Ladji Doucouré of France; fifth-place finisher Staņislavs Olijars of Latvia was entered but did not start. Since winning the gold in 2004, Liu had broken the world record in 2006 and won the world championship in 2007. However, Dayron Robles of Cuba had bettered Liu's mark two months before the Games and was favored over the home country hero. Further, there were rumors of Liu being injured.

Belarus and the Cayman Islands each made their first appearance in the event. The United States made its 25th appearance, most of any nation (having missed only the boycotted 1980 Games).

== Qualification ==
Each National Olympic Committee (NOC) was able to enter up to three entrants providing they had met the A qualifying standard (13.55) in the qualifying period (1 January 2007 to 23 July 2008). NOCs were also permitted to enter one athlete providing he had met the B standard (13.72) in the same qualifying period. The maximum number of athletes per nation had been set at 3 since the 1930 Olympic Congress.

== Competition format ==
The competition used the four-round format previously used in 1960 and since 1988, still using the eight-man semifinals and finals used since 1964. The "fastest loser" system, also introduced in 1964, was used in the first round.

The first round consisted of six heats, with 7 or 8 hurdlers each. The top four hurdlers in each heat, along with the eight next fastest overall, advanced to the quarterfinals. The 32 quarterfinalists were divided into four heats of 8 hurdlers each, with the top three in each heat, and the four next fastest overall, advancing. The 16 semifinalists were divided into two semifinals of 8 hurdlers each; the top four hurdlers in each advanced to the 8-man final.

== Records ==
Prior to this competition, the existing world record, Olympic record, and world leading time were as follows:

World record	Dayron Robles (CUB)	12.87	Ostrava, Czech Republic	12 June 2008
Olympic record	Liu Xiang (CHN)	12.91	Athens, Greece	27 August 2004
World Leading	Dayron Robles (CUB)	12.87	Ostrava, Czech Republic	12 June 2008

No new world or Olympic records were set for this event. The following national records were set during the competition:

Nation	Athlete	Round	Time
Barbados	Ryan Brathwaite	Heat 3	13.38
Cayman Islands	Ronald Forbes	Heat 3	13.59
Greece	Konstadinos Douvalidis	Quarterfinal 1	13.46
South Korea	Lee Jung-Joon	Quarterfinal 1	13.55

== Schedule ==
All times are China Standard Time (UTC+8)

Date	Time	Round
Monday, 18 August 2008	11:10	Round 1
Tuesday, 19 August 2008	20:45	Quarterfinals
Wednesday, 20 August 2008	21:30	Semifinals
Thursday, 21 August 2008	21:40	Final

== Results ==
=== Round 1 ===
Qualification: First 4 in each heat (Q) and the next 8 fastest (q) advance to the quarterfinals.

==== Heat 1 ====
Rank	Lane	Athlete	Nation	Reaction	Time	Notes
1	6	Dayron Robles	Cuba	0.180	13.39	Q
2	4	Andrew Turner	Great Britain	0.151	13.56	Q
3	5	Ji Wei	China	0.186	13.57	Q
4	8	Richard Phillips	Jamaica	0.160	13.60	Q
5	3	Evgeniy Borisov	Russia	0.187	13.90	
6	2	Oleg Normatov	Uzbekistan	0.177	14.00	
7	7	Jurica Grabušic	Croatia	0.207	14.18	
				Wind: +0.3 m/s		

==== Heat 2 ====
Rank	Lane	Athlete	Nation	Reaction	Time	Notes
1	6	David Oliver	United States	0.167	13.30	Q
2	5	Jackson Quiñónez	Spain	0.179	13.41	Q
3	2	Shamar Sands	Bahamas	0.167	13.45	Q
4	3	Gregory Sedoc	Netherlands	0.155	13.50	Q, SB
5	8	Lee Jung-Joon	South Korea	0.128	13.65	q
6	4	Mikel Thomas	Trinidad and Tobago	0.159	13.69	q, PB
7	7	Damjan Zlatnar	Slovenia	0.124	13.84	q
				Wind: +0.1 m/s		

==== Heat 3 ====
Rank	Lane	Athlete	Nation	Reaction	Time	Notes
1	4	Paulo Villar	Colombia	0.144	13.37	Q, SB
2	2	Ryan Brathwaite	Barbados	0.156	13.38	Q, NR
3	5	Petr Svoboda	Czech Republic	0.153	13.43	Q
4	7	Shi Dongpeng	China	0.203	13.53	Q
5	8	Ronald Forbes	Cayman Islands	0.170	13.59	q, NR
6	6	Héctor Cotto	Puerto Rico	0.140	13.72	q
7	9	Dudley Dorival	Haiti	0.165	13.78	q, SB
8	3	Abdul Rashid	Pakistan	0.172	14.52	
				Wind: +0.2 m/s		

==== Heat 4 ====
Rank	Lane	Athlete	Nation	Reaction	Time	Notes
1	2	David Payne	United States	0.152	13.42	Q
2	6	Ladji Doucouré	France	0.155	13.52	Q
3	8	Selim Nurudeen	Nigeria	0.174	13.58	Q, PB
4	5	Maurice Wignall	Jamaica	0.174	13.61	Q, SB
5	7	Maksim Lynsha	Belarus	0.196	13.86	
6	3	Stanislav Sajdok	Czech Republic	0.163	13.89	
7	4	Masato Naito	Japan	0.168	13.96	
				Wind: -1.1 m/s		

==== Heat 5 ====
Rank	Lane	Athlete	Nation	Reaction	Time	Notes
1	4	Artur Noga	Poland	0.175	13.53	Q
2	5	Igor Peremota	Russia	0.142	13.59	Q
3	6	Dániel Kiss	Hungary	0.153	13.61	Q, SB
4	8	Anselmo da Silva	Brazil	0.137	13.81	Q
5	3	Joseph-Berlioz Randriamihaja	Madagascar	0.174	13.91	
—	2	Terrence Trammell	United States	0.242	DNF	
—	7	Staņislavs Olijars	Latvia	DNS		
				Wind: -0.1 m/s		

==== Heat 6 ====
Van der Westen false-started; Liu was clearly in discomfort during the abortive run. He withdrew rather than returning to the starting blocks.

Rank	Lane	Athlete	Nation	Reaction	Time	Notes
1	8	Konstadinos Douvalidis	Greece	0.149	13.49	Q, =NR
2	5	Marcel van der Westen	Netherlands	0.162	13.54	Q
3	7	Allan Scott	Great Britain	0.146	13.56	Q
4	4	Samuel Coco-Viloin	France	0.176	13.60	Q
5	3	Mohamed Issa Al-Thawadi	Qatar	0.127	13.64	q, SB
6	6	David Ilariani	Georgia	0.155	13.75	q
—	2	Liu Xiang	China	—	DNF	
				Wind: +0.1 m/s		

==== Overall results for round 1 ====
Rank	Heat	Athlete	Nation	Time	Notes
1	2	David Oliver	United States	13.30	Q
2	3	Paulo Villar	Colombia	13.37	Q, SB
3	3	Ryan Brathwaite	Barbados	13.38	Q, NR
4	1	Dayron Robles	Cuba	13.39	Q
5	2	Jackson Quiñónez	Spain	13.41	Q
6	4	David Payne	United States	13.42	Q
7	3	Petr Svoboda	Czech Republic	13.43	Q
8	2	Shamar Sands	Bahamas	13.45	Q
9	6	Konstadinos Douvalidis	Greece	13.49	Q, =NR
10	2	Gregory Sedoc	Netherlands	13.50	Q, SB
11	4	Ladji Doucouré	France	13.52	Q
12	5	Artur Noga	Poland	13.53	Q
12	3	Shi Dongpeng	China	13.53	Q
14	6	Marcel van der Westen	Netherlands	13.54	Q
15	6	Allan Scott	Great Britain	13.56	Q
15	1	Andrew Turner	Great Britain	13.56	Q
17	1	Ji Wei	China	13.57	Q
18	4	Selim Nurudeen	Nigeria	13.58	Q, PB
19	3	Ronald Forbes	Cayman Islands	13.59	q, NR
19	5	Igor Peremota	Russia	13.59	Q
21	6	Samuel Coco-Viloin	France	13.60	Q
21	1	Richard Phillips	Jamaica	13.60	Q
23	5	Dániel Kiss	Hungary	13.61	Q, SB
23	4	Maurice Wignall	Jamaica	13.61	Q, SB
25	6	Mohamed Issa Al-Thawadi	Qatar	13.64	q, SB
26	2	Lee Jung-Joon	South Korea	13.65	q
27	2	Mikel Thomas	Trinidad and Tobago	13.69	q, PB
28	3	Héctor Cotto	Puerto Rico	13.72	q
29	6	David Ilariani	Georgia	13.75	q
30	3	Dudley Dorival	Haiti	13.78	q, SB
31	5	Anselmo da Silva	Brazil	13.81	Q
32	2	Damjan Zlatnar	Slovenia	13.84	q
33	4	Maksim Lynsha	Belarus	13.86	
34	4	Stanislav Sajdok	Czech Republic	13.89	
35	1	Evgeniy Borisov	Russia	13.90	
36	5	Joseph-Berlioz Randriamihaja	Madagascar	13.91	
37	4	Masato Naito	Japan	13.96	
38	1	Oleg Normatov	Uzbekistan	14.00	
39	1	Jurica Grabušic	Croatia	14.18	
40	3	Abdul Rashid	Pakistan	14.52	
	6	Liu Xiang	China	DNF	
	5	Terrence Trammell	United States	DNF	
	5	Staņislavs Olijars	Latvia	DNS	

=== Quarterfinals ===
Qualification: First 3 in each heat (Q) and the next 4 fastest (q) advance to the semifinals.

==== Quarterfinal 1 ====
Rank	Lane	Athlete	Nation	Reaction	Time	Notes
1	4	David Payne	United States	0.158	13.24	Q
2	7	Petr Svoboda	Czech Republic	0.175	13.41	Q
3	9	Shi Dongpeng	China	0.148	13.42	Q
4	5	Konstadinos Douvalidis	Greece	0.159	13.46	q, NR
5	8	Richard Phillips	Jamaica	0.136	13.48	q, SB
6	3	Mikel Thomas	Trinidad and Tobago	0.156	13.62	PB
7	6	Igor Peremota	Russia	0.143	13.70	
8	2	Héctor Cotto	Puerto Rico	0.152	13.73	
				Wind: +0.1 m/s		

==== Quarterfinal 2 ====
Rank	Lane	Athlete	Nation	Reaction	Time	Notes
1	4	Dayron Robles	Cuba	0.167	13.19	Q
2	6	Artur Noga	Poland	0.161	13.36	Q, PB
3	9	Gregory Sedoc	Netherlands	0.153	13.43	Q, SB
4	8	Samuel Coco-Viloin	France	0.188	13.51	q
5	5	Andrew Turner	Great Britain	0.147	13.53	
6	3	Lee Jung-Joon	South Korea	0.138	13.55	NR
7	7	Shamar Sands	Bahamas	0.227	13.55	
8	2	David Ilariani	Georgia	0.149	13.74	
				Wind: +0.0 m/s		

==== Quarterfinal 3 ====
Rank	Lane	Athlete	Nation	Reaction	Time	Notes
1	8	Maurice Wignall	Jamaica	0.173	13.36	Q, SB
2	5	Ryan Brathwaite	Barbados	0.162	13.44	Q
3	7	Paulo Villar	Colombia	0.153	13.46	Q
4	4	Marcel van der Westen	Netherlands	0.149	13.48	q
5	9	Dániel Kiss	Hungary	0.159	13.63	
6	6	Allan Scott	Great Britain	0.121	13.66	
7	3	Dudley Dorival	Haiti	0.142	13.71	SB
—	2	Mohamed Issa Al-Thawadi	Qatar	DSQ		
				Wind: +0.0 m/s		

==== Quarterfinal 4 ====
Rank	Lane	Athlete	Nation	Reaction	Time	Notes
1	5	David Oliver	United States	0.156	13.16	Q
2	7	Ladji Doucouré	France	0.190	13.39	Q
3	4	Jackson Quiñónez	Spain	0.167	13.47	Q
4	9	Selim Nurudeen	Nigeria	0.194	13.66	
5	3	Ronald Forbes	Cayman Islands	0.175	13.72	
6	6	Ji Wei	China	0.173	13.80	
7	8	Anselmo da Silva	Brazil	0.154	13.84	
—	2	Damjan Zlatnar	Slovenia	DNS		
				Wind: +0.1 m/s		

==== Overall results for quarterfinals ====
Rank	Heat	Athlete	Nation	Time	Notes
1	4	David Oliver	United States	13.16	Q
2	2	Dayron Robles	Cuba	13.19	Q
3	1	David Payne	United States	13.24	Q
4	2	Artur Noga	Poland	13.36	Q, PB
4	3	Maurice Wignall	Jamaica	13.36	Q, SB
6	4	Ladji Doucouré	France	13.39	Q
7	1	Petr Svoboda	Czech Republic	13.41	Q
8	1	Shi Dongpeng	China	13.42	Q
9	2	Gregory Sedoc	Netherlands	13.43	Q, SB
10	3	Ryan Brathwaite	Barbados	13.44	Q
11	1	Konstadinos Douvalidis	Greece	13.46	q, NR
11	3	Paulo Villar	Colombia	13.46	Q
13	4	Jackson Quiñónez	Spain	13.47	Q
14	1	Richard Phillips	Jamaica	13.48	q, SB
14	3	Marcel van der Westen	Netherlands	13.48	q
16	2	Samuel Coco-Viloin	France	13.51	q
17	2	Andrew Turner	Great Britain	13.53	
18	2	Lee Jung-Joon	South Korea	13.55	NR
19	2	Shamar Sands	Bahamas	13.55	
20	1	Mikel Thomas	Trinidad and Tobago	13.62	PB
21	3	Dániel Kiss	Hungary	13.63	
22	4	Selim Nurudeen	Nigeria	13.66	
22	3	Allan Scott	Great Britain	13.66	
24	1	Igor Peremota	Russia	13.70	
25	3	Dudley Dorival	Haiti	13.71	SB
26	4	Ronald Forbes	Cayman Islands	13.72	
27	1	Héctor Cotto	Puerto Rico	13.73	
28	2	David Ilariani	Georgia	13.74	
29	4	Ji Wei	China	13.80	
30	4	Anselmo da Silva	Brazil	13.84	
	3	Mohamed Issa Al-Thawadi	Qatar	DSQ	
	4	Damjan Zlatnar	Slovenia	DNS	

=== Semifinals ===
Qualification: First 4 in each heat(Q) advance to the Final.

==== Semifinal 1 ====
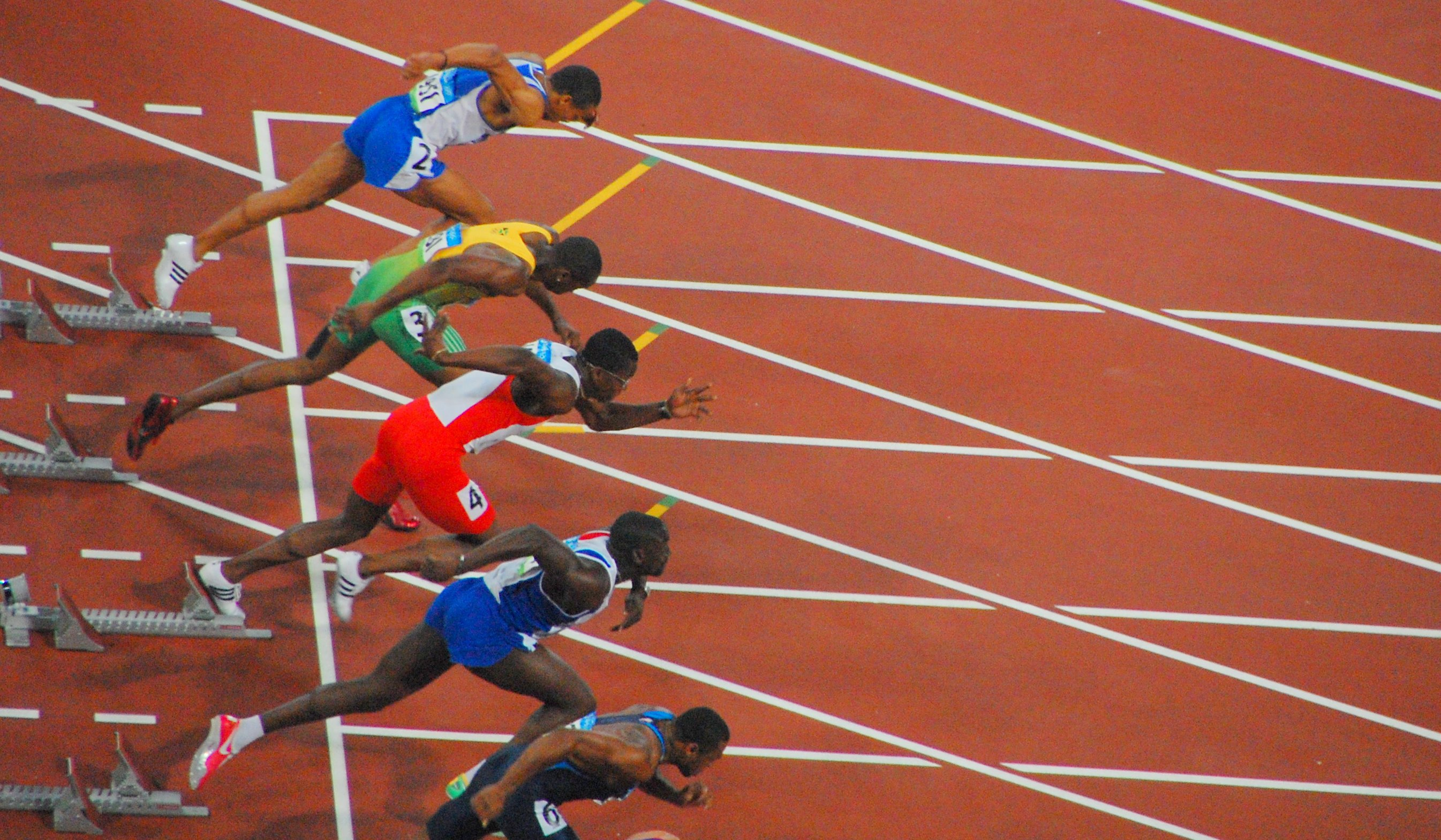
Men's 110m Hurdles Semifinal 1

The first semifinal start at 21:30 on 20 August 2008.

Rank	Lane	Athlete	Nation	Reaction	Time	Notes
1	4	Dayron Robles	Cuba	0.221	13.12	Q
2	6	David Payne	United States	0.177	13.21	Q, SB
3	5	Ladji Doucouré	France	0.183	13.22	Q, SB
4	3	Richard Phillips	Jamaica	0.153	13.43	Q, SB
5	2	Konstadinos Douvalidis	Greece	0.157	13.55	
6	8	Gregory Sedoc	Netherlands	0.162	13.60	
7	7	Petr Svoboda	Czech Republic	0.182	13.60	
8	9	Paulo Villar	Colombia	0.153	13.85	
				Wind: -0.4 m/s		

==== Semifinal 2 ====
The second semifinal started at 21:39 on 20 August 2008.

Rank	Lane	Athlete	Nation	Reaction	Time	Notes
1	6	David Oliver	United States	0.169	13.31	Q
2	5	Artur Noga	Poland	0.181	13.34	Q, PB
3	9	Jackson Quiñónez	Spain	0.173	13.40	Q, =SB
4	7	Maurice Wignall	Jamaica	0.141	13.40	Q
5	8	Shi Dongpeng	China	0.141	13.42	
6	3	Marcel van der Westen	Netherlands	0.124	13.45	
7	4	Ryan Brathwaite	Barbados	0.147	13.59	
8	2	Samuel Coco-Viloin	France	0.187	13.65	
				Wind: -0.4 m/s		

=== Final ===
Rank	Lane	Athlete	Nation	Reaction	Time	Notes
1st place, gold medalist(s)	6	Dayron Robles	Cuba	0.183	12.93	
2nd place, silver medalist(s)	5	David Payne	United States	0.175	13.17	SB
3rd place, bronze medalist(s)	7	David Oliver	United States	0.158	13.18	PB
4	8	Ladji Doucouré	France	0.170	13.24	
5	4	Artur Noga	Poland	0.169	13.36	
6	2	Maurice Wignall	Jamaica	0.163	13.46	
7	3	Richard Phillips	Jamaica	0.154	13.60	
8	9	Jackson Quiñónez	Spain	0.187	13.69	
				Wind: +0.1 m/s		
