= 2005 World Championships in Athletics – Men's 110 metres hurdles =

The 110 metres hurdles event at the 2005 World Championships in Athletics was held at the Helsinki Olympic Stadium on August 10, 11 and 12.

The top three runners in each of the initial six heats automatically qualified for the semifinals. The next six fastest runners from across the heats also qualified. There were three semifinal heats, and only the top two from each heat plus the next two fastest runners advanced to the final.

== Medalists ==
| Gold | Ladji Doucouré; France (FRA) |
| Silver | Liu Xiang; China (CHN) |
| Bronze | Allen Johnson; United States (USA) |

== Results ==
All times shown are in seconds.
Q denotes qualification by place.
q denotes qualification by time.
DNS denotes did not start.
DNF denotes did not finish.
AR denotes area record
NR denotes national record.
PB denotes personal best.
SB denotes season's best.

=== Round 1 ===
August 10

==== Heat 1 ====
1. Thomas Blaschek, Germany 13.86s Q
2. Allen Johnson, United States 13.92s Q
3. Yoel Hernández, Cuba 14.03s Q
4. Ivan Bitzi, Switzerland 14.26s
5. Cédric Lavanne, France 14.49s
6. Alexandros Theofanov, Greece 14.73s
7. Todd Matthews-Jouda, Sudan 15.43s

==== Heat 2 ====
1. Liu Xiang, China 13.73s Q
2. Redelén dos Santos, Brazil 13.74s Q
3. Jonathan Nsenga, Belgium 13.89s Q
4. Anier García, Cuba 14.01s q
5. Elmar Lichtenegger, Austria 14.04s q
6. Matti Niemi, Finland 14.18s
7. Jackson Quiñónez, Ecuador 14.34s
8. Baymurat Ashirmuradov, Turkmenistan 15.52s

==== Heat 3 ====
1. Ladji Doucouré, France 13.86s Q
2. Mateus Facho Inocêncio, Brazil 13.96s Q
3. Chris Pinnock, Jamaica 14.11s Q
4. Gregory Sedoc, Netherlands 14.24s
5. Sergiy Demydyuk, Ukraine 14.25s
6. Karl Jennings, Canada 14.30s
7. Sultan Tucker, Liberia 14.34s
- Andrea Giaconi, Italy DNS

==== Heat 4 ====
1. Shi Dongpeng, China 13.80s Q
2. Terrence Trammell, United States 13.80s Q
3. Igor Peremota, Russia 13.89s Q
4. Robert Kronberg, Sweden 13.90s q
5. Masato Naito, Japan 13.90s q
6. (United Kingdom) Allan Scott, Great Britain 14.18s
7. Peter Coghlan, Republic of Ireland 14.57s
8. Hon Sing Tang, Hong Kong 14.83s

==== Heat 5 ====
1. Anselmo da Silva, Brazil 13.96s Q
2. Dominique Arnold, United States 13.96s Q
3. Marcel van der Westen, Netherlands 14.01s Q
4. Paulo Villar, Colombia 14.12s
5. Joseph-Berlioz Randriamihaja, Madagascar 14.18s
6. Satoru Tanigawa, Japan 14.25s
7. Felipe Vivancos, Spain 14.34s
8. Julien M'Voutoukoulou, Republic of the Congo 15.41s

==== Heat 6 ====
1. Dayron Robles, Cuba 13.83s Q
2. Staņislavs Olijars, Latvia 13.86s Q
3. Joel Brown, United States 13.90s Q
4. Maurice Wignall, Jamaica 13.90s q
5. Dudley Dorival, Haiti 14.02s q
6. Wu Youjia, China 14.38s
7. (Georgia (country)) David Ilariani, Georgia 14.88s
8. Suphan Wongsriphuck, Thailand 15.05s

=== Semifinals ===
August 11

==== Semifinal 1 ====
1. Ladji Doucouré, France 13.35s Q
2. Dominique Arnold, United States 13.39s Q
3. Shi Dongpeng, China 13.44s
4. Yoel Hernández, Cuba 13.54s
5. Igor Peremota, Russia 13.71s
6. Redelén dos Santos, Brazil 13.88s
7. Masato Naito, Japan 13.88s
8. Dudley Dorival, Haiti 14.11s

==== Semifinal 2 ====
1. Terrence Trammell, United States 13.31s Q
2. Liu Xiang, China 13.42s Q
3. Staņislavs Olijars, Latvia 13.53s
4. Anselmo da Silva, Brazil 13.63s
5. Robert Kronberg, Sweden 13.69s
6. Chris Pinnock, Jamaica 13.73s
7. Jonathan Nsenga, Belgium 13.94s
8. Anier García, Cuba 13.99s

==== Semifinal 3 ====
1. Allen Johnson, United States 13.23s Q
2. Maurice Wignall, Jamaica 13.24s Q (SB)
3. Mateus Facho Inocêncio, Brazil 13.39s q
4. Joel Brown, United States 13.43s q
5. Thomas Blaschek, Germany 13.45s
6. Marcel van der Westen, Netherlands 13.63s
7. Elmar Lichtenegger, Austria 13.74s
8. Dayron Robles, Cuba 14.16s

=== Final ===
August 12

1. Ladji Doucouré, France 13.07s
2. Liu Xiang, China 13.08s
3. Allen Johnson, United States 13.10s
4. Dominique Arnold, United States 13.13s
5. Terrence Trammell, United States 13.20s
6. Joel Brown, United States 13.47s
7. Maurice Wignall, Jamaica 13.47s
8. Mateus Facho Inocêncio, Brazil 13.48s
