= 2004 IAAF World Indoor Championships – Men's 60 metres hurdles =

60 meters men hurdles event at 2004 IAAF

The Men's 60 metres hurdles event at the 2004 IAAF World Indoor Championships was held on March 6.

== Medalists ==
Gold	Silver	Bronze
Allen Johnson; United States	Liu Xiang; China	Maurice Wignall; Jamaica

== Results ==
=== Heat ===
First 3 of each heat (Q) and next 4 fastest (q) qualified for the semifinals.

Rank	Heat	Name	Nationality	Time	Notes
1	2	Yuniel Hernández	Cuba	7.59	Q
2	1	Liu Xiang	China	7.63	Q
3	1	Yoel Hernández	Cuba	7.64	Q
3	3	Stanislavs Olijars	Latvia	7.64	Q, SB
5	3	Dwight Thomas	Jamaica	7.65	Q
6	3	Allen Johnson	United States	7.67	Q
6	4	Maurice Wignall	Jamaica	7.67	Q
8	1	Ivan Bitzi	Switzerland	7.69	Q
8	2	Charles Allen	Canada	7.69	Q
8	3	Robert Kronberg	Sweden	7.69	q
11	2	Sébastien Denis	France	7.70	Q
12	1	Gregory Sedoc	Netherlands	7.72	q
12	1	Redelén dos Santos	Brazil	7.72	q
12	2	Andrea Giaconi	Italy	7.72	q, SB
15	4	Shaun Bownes	South Africa	7.73	Q
16	4	Mohammed Sillah-Freckleton	Great Britain	7.75	Q
17	4	Shi Dongpeng	China	7.75	PB
18	3	Gergely Palágyi	Hungary	7.76	PB
19	1	Masato Naito	Japan	7.77	NR
20	1	Serhiy Demydyuk	Ukraine	7.78	
20	4	Márcio Simão de Souza	Brazil	7.78	
22	4	Felipe Vivancos	Spain	7.79	
23	3	Robert Newton	Great Britain	7.80	
24	3	Marcel van der Westen	Netherlands	7.83	
24	4	Igor Peremota	Russia	7.83	
26	1	Mohamed Robani Hassan	Malaysia	8.04	
27	4	Muhammad Shah	Pakistan	8.29	
28	2	Sultan Tucker	Liberia	8.35	q
28	2	Elton Bitincka	Albania	8.35	
30	2	Arlindo Leócadio Pinheiro	São Tomé and Príncipe	8.70	
	2	Duane Ross	United States	DQ	

=== Semifinals ===
First 2 of each semifinal (Q) and next 2 fastest (q) qualified for the final.

Rank	Heat	Name	Nationality	Time	Notes
1	1	Liu Xiang	China	7.46	Q, AR
2	3	Stanislavs Olijars	Latvia	7.55	Q, SB
3	3	Maurice Wignall	Jamaica	7.55	Q
4	3	Allen Johnson	United States	7.58	q
5	1	Yoel Hernández	Cuba	7.59	Q
5	2	Yuniel Hernández	Cuba	7.59	Q
5	2	Dwight Thomas	Jamaica	7.59	Q, PB
8	2	Robert Kronberg	Sweden	7.61	q
9	1	Gregory Sedoc	Netherlands	7.66	PB
9	3	Andrea Giaconi	Italy	7.66	PB
11	1	Shaun Bownes	South Africa	7.67	
12	1	Sébastien Denis	France	7.69	
13	2	Charles Allen	Canada	7.71	
14	3	Redelén dos Santos	Brazil	7.74	
15	1	Sultan Tucker	Liberia	7.77	
16	2	Mohammed Sillah-Freckleton	Great Britain	7.80	
17	3	Ivan Bitzi	Switzerland	7.82	

=== Final ===
Rank	Lane	Name	Nationality	Time	React	Notes
1st place, gold medalist(s)	7	Allen Johnson	United States	7.36	0.144	CR, =AR
2nd place, silver medalist(s)	4	Liu Xiang	China	7.43	0.143	AR
3rd place, bronze medalist(s)	6	Maurice Wignall	Jamaica	7.48	0.116	NR
4	5	Stanislavs Olijars	Latvia	7.49	0.136	PB
5	3	Yuniel Hernández	Cuba	7.58	0.144	
6	2	Robert Kronberg	Sweden	7.59	0.149	SB
7	8	Yoel Hernández	Cuba	7.78	0.133	
8	1	Dwight Thomas	Jamaica	7.87	0.143	
