= 2003 IAAF World Indoor Championships – Men's 60 metres hurdles =

The men's 60 metres hurdles event at the 2003 IAAF World Indoor Championships was held on March 15–16.

== Medalists ==
Gold	Silver	Bronze
Allen Johnson; United States	Anier García; Cuba	Liu Xiang; China

== Results ==
=== Heats ===
First 3 of each heat (Q) and next 4 fastest (q) qualified for the semifinals.

Rank	Heat	Name	Nationality	Time	Notes
1	1	Stanislavs Olijars	Latvia	7.50	Q, SB
2	1	Anier García	Cuba	7.56	Q
2	2	Colin Jackson	Great Britain	7.56	Q
4	2	Ladji Doucouré	France	7.61	Q, PB
5	2	Liu Xiang	China	7.63	Q
6	3	Robert Kronberg	Sweden	7.68	Q
7	3	Elmar Lichtenegger	Austria	7.68	Q
8	2	Charles Allen	Canada	7.70	q, PB
8	3	Gregory Sedoc	Netherlands	7.70	Q, PB
10	1	Shaun Bownes	South Africa	7.73	Q
11	4	Allen Johnson	United States	7.74	Q
12	3	Ivan Bitzi	Switzerland	7.75	q
13	1	Sultan Tucker	Liberia	7.76	q
14	4	Matti Niemi	Finland	7.77	Q
15	1	Cédric Lavanne	France	7.79	q
15	2	Felipe Vivancos	Spain	7.79	q
17	2	Márcio Simão de Souza	Brazil	7.80	
18	3	Shi Dongpeng	China	7.81	
18	4	Dudley Dorival	Haiti	7.81	Q, SB
18	4	Dwight Thomas	Jamaica	7.81	
21	4	Marcel van der Westen	Netherlands	7.83	
22	4	Yoel Hernández	Cuba	7.86	
23	1	Anselmo da Silva	Brazil	7.87	
24	1	Andrey Kislykh	Russia	7.90	
25	3	Miroslav Novaković	Serbia and Montenegro	7.94	
26	3	Ricardo Melbourne	Jamaica	7.94	
27	4	Jonathan Nsenga	Belgium	8.03	
28	2	Arlindo Leócadio Pinheiro	São Tomé and Príncipe	8.57	
29	1	Elton Bitincka	Albania	8.62	
	2	David Ilariani	Georgia	DNF	
	3	Terrence Trammell	United States	DNS	

=== Semifinals ===
First 4 of each semifinal qualified (Q) directly for the final.

Rank	Heat	Name	Nationality	Time	Notes
1	2	Anier García	Cuba	7.49	Q
2	2	Stanislavs Olijars	Latvia	7.50	Q, SB
3	2	Liu Xiang	China	7.54	Q
4	1	Colin Jackson	Great Britain	7.55	Q
5	2	Allen Johnson	United States	7.57	Q
6	1	Robert Kronberg	Sweden	7.64	Q
7	1	Ladji Doucouré	France	7.67	Q
8	1	Shaun Bownes	South Africa	7.68	Q
9	1	Elmar Lichtenegger	Austria	7.70	
10	2	Charles Allen	Canada	7.70	PB
11	2	Cédric Lavanne	France	7.71	
12	2	Matti Niemi	Finland	7.72	
13	1	Gregory Sedoc	Netherlands	7.75	
14	1	Ivan Bitzi	Switzerland	7.80	
15	2	Dudley Dorival	Haiti	7.81	SB
16	2	Felipe Vivancos	Spain	7.81	
17	1	Sultan Tucker	Liberia	7.87	

=== Final ===
Rank	Lane	Name	Nationality	Time	React	Notes
1st place, gold medalist(s)	7	Allen Johnson	United States	7.47	0.155	
2nd place, silver medalist(s)	4	Anier García	Cuba	7.49	0.150	
3rd place, bronze medalist(s)	2	Liu Xiang	China	7.52	0.138	
4	8	Ladji Doucouré	France	7.58	0.163	PB
5	3	Colin Jackson	Great Britain	7.61	0.128	
6	5	Stanislavs Olijars	Latvia	7.62	0.147	
7	6	Robert Kronberg	Sweden	7.67	0.140	
8	1	Shaun Bownes	South Africa	7.67	0.116	
