= 1997 European Athletics U23 Championships – Men's 110 metres hurdles =

The men's 110 metres hurdles event at the 1997 European Athletics U23 Championships was held in Turku, Finland, on 10 and 11 July 1997.

== Medalists ==
Gold	Frank Busemann; Germany
Silver	Sven Pieters; Belgium
Bronze	Andrey Kislykh; Russia

== Results ==
=== Final ===
11 July
Wind: 2.2 m/s

Rank	Name	Nationality	Time	Notes
1st place, gold medalist(s)	Frank Busemann	Germany	13.54 w	
2nd place, silver medalist(s)	Sven Pieters	Belgium	13.56 w	
3rd place, bronze medalist(s)	Andrey Kislykh	Russia	13.56 w	
4	Jerome Crews	Germany	13.69 w	
5	Ross Baillie	Great Britain	13.94 w	
6	Matti Niemi	Finland	13.97 w	
7	Damien Greaves	Great Britain	14.25 w	
	Robert Kronberg	Sweden	DNF	

=== Semifinals ===
11 July
Qualified: first 4 in each to the Final

==== Semifinal 1 ====
Wind: 1.6 m/s

Rank	Name	Nationality	Time	Notes
1	Sven Pieters	Belgium	13.70	Q
2	Robert Kronberg	Sweden	13.77	Q
3	Jerome Crews	Germany	13.88	Q
4	Damien Greaves	Great Britain	13.96	Q
5	Luca Giovannelli	Italy	13.98	
6	Vitaliy Balykin	Russia	14.12	
7	Peter Coghlan	Ireland	14.66	
8	Ivan Bitzi	Switzerland	14.68	

==== Semifinal 2 ====
Wind: 3.5 m/s

Rank	Name	Nationality	Time	Notes
1	Andrey Kislykh	Russia	13.56 w	Q
2	Frank Busemann	Germany	13.77 w	Q
3	Ross Baillie	Great Britain	13.90 w	Q
4	Matti Niemi	Finland	13.98 w	Q
5	Zhivko Videnov	Bulgaria	14.06 w	
6	Balázs Kovács	Hungary	14.15 w	
7	Zoran Miljuš	Croatia	14.18 w	
8	Stefan Heinas	Sweden	14.19 w	

=== Heats ===
10 July
Qualified: first 4 in each heat and 4 best to the Semifinal

==== Heat 1 ====
Wind: 0.8 m/s

Rank	Name	Nationality	Time	Notes
1	Frank Busemann	Germany	13.85	Q
2	Zhivko Videnov	Bulgaria	13.95	Q
3	Damien Greaves	Great Britain	13.97	Q
4	Balázs Kovács	Hungary	14.02	Q
5	Ivan Bitzi	Switzerland	14.15	q
6	Vitaliy Balykin	Russia	14.16	q
7	Blaž Korent	Slovenia	14.56	

==== Heat 2 ====
Wind: 2.0 m/s

Rank	Name	Nationality	Time	Notes
1	Andrey Kislykh	Russia	13.59	Q
2	Jerome Crews	Germany	13.74	Q
3	Ross Baillie	Great Britain	13.92	Q
4	Matti Niemi	Finland	13.93	Q
5	Stefan Heinas	Sweden	14.20	q
6	Kenneth Halhjem	Norway	14.24	
7	Javier Vega	Spain	14.36	

==== Heat 3 ====
Wind: 0.3 m/s

Rank	Name	Nationality	Time	Notes
1	Sven Pieters	Belgium	13.56	Q
2	Robert Kronberg	Sweden	13.85	Q
3	Luca Giovannelli	Italy	14.06	Q
4	Peter Coghlan	Ireland	14.08	Q
5	Zoran Miljuš	Croatia	14.15	q
6	Serhat Ulucan	Turkey	15.70	
7	Philippe Lamine	France	16.63	
	Daniel Carrillo	Spain	DNF	

== Participation ==
According to an unofficial count, 22 athletes from 17 countries participated in the event.

- Belgium (1)
- Bulgaria (1)
- Croatia (1)
- Finland (1)
- France (1)
- Germany (2)
- Great Britain (2)
- Hungary (1)
- Ireland (1)
- Italy (1)
- Norway (1)
- Russia (2)
- Slovenia (1)
- Spain (2)
- Sweden (2)
- Switzerland (1)
- Turkey (1)
