= 1998 European Athletics Indoor Championships – Men's 60 metres hurdles =

The men's 60 metres hurdles event at the 1998 European Athletics Indoor Championships was held on 28 February–1 March.

== Medalists ==
Gold	Silver	Bronze
Igors Kazanovs; Latvia	Tomasz Ścigaczewski; Poland	Mike Fenner; Germany

== Results ==
=== Heats ===
First 3 from each heat (Q) and the next 4 fastest (q) qualified for the semifinals.

Rank	Heat	Name	Nationality	Time	Notes
1	4	Tony Jarrett	Great Britain	7.52	Q
2	1	Andrew Tulloch	Great Britain	7.56	Q
3	3	Tomasz Ścigaczewski	Poland	7.60	Q
4	3	Emiliano Pizzoli	Italy	7.60	Q, NR
5	4	Ronald Mehlich	Poland	7.61	Q
6	1	Mike Fenner	Germany	7.62	Q
7	3	Dan Philibert	France	7.62	Q
8	4	Yevgeniy Pechonkin	Russia	7.63	Q
9	4	Jonathan Nsenga	Belgium	7.65	q
10	1	Robin Korving	Netherlands	7.66	Q
10	2	Igors Kazanovs	Latvia	7.66	Q
12	4	Staņislavs Olijars	Latvia	7.68	q
13	1	Sven Pieters	Belgium	7.70	q
13	4	Jean-Luc Poussin	France	7.70	q
15	2	Levente Csillag	Hungary	7.71	Q
15	2	Sébastien Thibault	France	7.71	Q
17	1	Elmar Lichtenegger	Austria	7.72	
18	1	Henrik Värendh	Sweden	7.73	
19	2	Damien Greaves	Great Britain	7.77	
20	2	Stamatios Magos	Greece	7.79	
20	3	Raphaël Monachon	Switzerland	7.79	
22	2	Robert Kronberg	Sweden	7.82	
23	3	Jerome Crews	Germany	7.84	
24	2	Ivan Bitzi	Switzerland	7.85	
25	4	Miguel de los Santos	Spain	7.87	
26	1	Francisco Javier López	Spain	7.88	
27	4	Jan Schindzielorz	Germany	7.93	

=== Semifinals ===
First 4 from each semifinal qualified directly (Q) for the final.

Rank	Heat	Name	Nationality	Time	Notes
1	1	Igors Kazanovs	Latvia	7.50	Q
2	1	Jonathan Nsenga	Belgium	7.55	Q, NR
2	2	Andrew Tulloch	Great Britain	7.55	Q
4	1	Dan Philibert	France	7.57	Q
4	2	Yevgeniy Pechonkin	Russia	7.57	Q
6	2	Mike Fenner	Germany	7.60	Q
7	1	Ronald Mehlich	Poland	7.61	Q
8	1	Tony Jarrett	Great Britain	7.61	
9	2	Tomasz Ścigaczewski	Poland	7.63	Q
10	2	Sébastien Thibault	France	7.65	
11	1	Robin Korving	Netherlands	7.67	
12	2	Emiliano Pizzoli	Italy	7.68	
13	1	Levente Csillag	Hungary	7.69	
14	2	Staņislavs Olijars	Latvia	7.74	
15	1	Jean-Luc Poussin	France	7.77	
15	2	Sven Pieters	Belgium	7.77	

=== Final ===
Rank	Lane	Name	Nationality	Time	Notes
1st place, gold medalist(s)	3	Igors Kazanovs	Latvia	7.54	
2nd place, silver medalist(s)	2	Tomasz Ścigaczewski	Poland	7.56	
3rd place, bronze medalist(s)	1	Mike Fenner	Germany	7.58	
4	4	Jonathan Nsenga	Belgium	7.59	
5	7	Dan Philibert	France	7.60	
6	5	Yevgeniy Pechonkin	Russia	7.66	
7	6	Andrew Tulloch	Great Britain	7.66	
8	8	Ronald Mehlich	Poland	7.68	
