= Marcel van der Westen =

Dutch hurdler (born 1976)

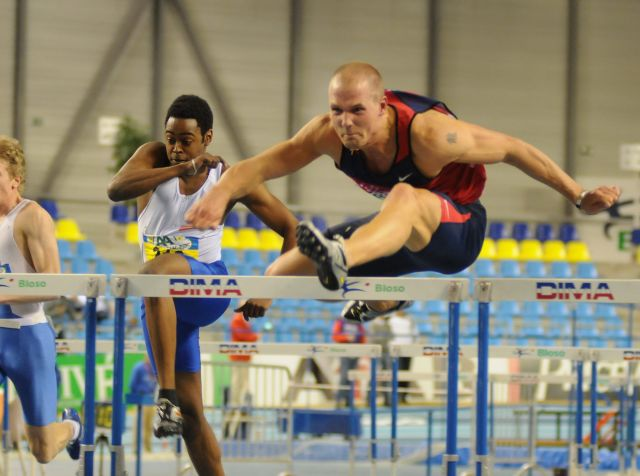

Personal information
- Full name: Marcel van der Westen
- Born: 1 August 1976 (age 50) Laren, Netherlands
- Years active: ? -present
- Height: 1.92 m (6 ft 4 in)
- Weight: 85 kg (187 lb)

Achievements and titles
- Personal bests: 200m - 21.77 (2006); 110m hurdles - 13.43 (2005)
Medal record
Men's Athletics
Representing Netherlands
European Indoor Championships
Silver medal – second place	2007 Birmingham	60 m hurdles
- Updated on 20 March 2008

Marcel van der Westen (born 1 August 1976) is a retired Dutch hurdler.

He reached his first international final at the 2007 European Indoor Championships in 60 metres hurdles, and won the silver medal behind compatriot Gregory Sedoc. In 2008 he became Amsterdam Sportsman of the year.

Van der Westen had previously competed at the 2005 World Championships and the 2006 European Championships, as well as numerous European Indoor (2002, 2005) and World Indoor Championships (2003, 2004, 2006), without ever reaching the final.

His personal best time over 110 m hurdles is 13.43 seconds, achieved in June 2005 in Leiria.

He currently lives in Weesp and works as a tax consultant.

== Competition record ==
Year	Competition	Venue	Position	Event	Notes
Representing Netherlands
2002	European Indoor Championships	Vienna, Austria	12th (sf)	60 m hurdles	7.85
2003	World Indoor Championships	Budapest, Hungary	21st (h)	60 m hurdles	7.83
2004	World Indoor Championships	Birmingham, United Kingdom	24th (h)	60 m hurdles	7.83
2005	European Indoor Championships	Madrid, Spain	21st (h)	60 m hurdles	7.87
2005	World Championships	Helsinki, Finland	13th (sf)	110 m hurdles	13.63
2006	World Indoor Championships	Moscow, Russia	17th (sf)	60 m hurdles	7.80
2006	European Championships	Gothenburg, Sweden	17th (h)	110 m hurdles	13.73
2007	European Indoor Championships	Birmingham, United Kingdom	2nd	60 m hurdles	7.64
2008	Olympic Games	Beijing, China	10th (sf)	110 m hurdles	13.45
2010	European Championships	Barcelona, Spain	7th	110 m hurdles	13.58
