= Jerome Crews =

German hurdler

Jérôme Marcel Crews
- Born: 20 February 1977 (age 49); Karlsruhe
- Occupation: Athlete

Jérôme Marcel Crews (born 20 February 1977 in Karlsruhe) is a retired German athlete who specialised in the 110 metres hurdles. He represented his country at the 2004 Summer Olympics, as well as two World Championships, in 2001 and 2003.

He has personal bests of 13.41 seconds in the 110 metres hurdles (+0.1 m/s; Sindelfingen 1998) and 7.65 seconds in the 60 metres hurdles (Karlsruhe 1999).

== Competition record ==
Year	Competition	Venue	Position	Event	Notes
Representing Germany
1995	European Junior Championships	Nyíregyháza, Hungary	8th (h)	110 m hurdles	14.41
1996	World Junior Championships	Sydney, Australia	–	110 m hurdles	DQ
1996	World Junior Championships	Sydney, Australia	4th	4 × 100 m relay	39.67
1997	European U23 Championships	Turku, Finland	4th	110 m hurdles	13.69 w (wind: +2.2 m/s)
1998	European Indoor Championships	Valencia, Spain	23rd (h)	60 m hurdles	7.84
1998	European Championships	Budapest, Hungary	5th	4 × 100 m relay	39.09
1999	European U23 Championships	Gothenburg, Sweden	–	110 m hurdles	DNF
2001	World Championships	Edmonton, Canada	14th (sf)	110 m hurdles	13.55
2003	World Championships	Paris, France	14th (sf)	110 m hurdles	13.67
2004	Olympic Games	Athens, Greece	41st (h)	110 m hurdles	13.83
