= Allan Scott (hurdler) =

Scottish hurdler

Personal information
- Nationality: British (Scottish)
- Born: 27 December 1982 (age 42) Bellshill, Scotland
- Height: 189 cm (6 ft 2 in)
- Weight: 83 kg (183 lb)

Sport
- Sport: Athletics
- Event: Hurdles
- Club: Shaftesbury Barnet Harriers

Allan Scott (born 27 December 1982) is a Scottish former hurdler. He competed at the 2008 Summer Olympics.

== Biography ==
Scott, a member of the Shaftesbury Barnet Harriers athletics club. He became the British 110 metres champion after winning the British AAA Championships title in 2005.

He represented Scotland at the 2006 Commonwealth Games in Melbourne and at the 2008 Olympic Games in Beijing, he represented Great Britain in the 100 metres hurdles event.

== Competition record ==
| Year | Competition | Venue | Position | Event | Notes |
Representing Great Britain and Scotland
| 2005 | European Indoor Championships | Madrid, Spain | 9th (sf) | 60 m hurdles | 7.74 |
| 2005 | World Championships | Helsinki, Finland | 26th (sf) | 110 m hurdles | 14.18 |
| 2005 | Universiade | İzmir, Turkey | 5th | 110 m hurdles | 13.89 |
| 2006 | Commonwealth Games | Melbourne, Australia | 11th (sf) | 110 m hurdles | 13.86 |
| 2007 | European Indoor Championships | Birmingham, United Kingdom | 6th | 60 m hurdles | 7.71 |
| 2008 | World Indoor Championships | Valencia, Spain | 6th | 60 m hurdles | 7.65 |
| 2008 | Olympic Games | Beijing, China | 22nd (qf) | 110 m hurdles | 13.66 |
| 2009 | European Indoor Championships | Turin, Italy | 8th | 60 m hurdles | 7.78 |
