= Robert Kronberg =

Swedish hurdler

- Kronberg in 2000 Summer Olympics

Personal information
- Born: 15 August 1976 (age 50) Gothenburg, Sweden

Sport
- Sport: Track and field
Medal record
Representing Sweden
European Indoor Championships
| Bronze medal – third place | 2005 Madrid | 60m hurdles |
Summer Universiade
| Bronze medal – third place | 2001 Beijing | 110m hurdles |

Leif Robert Kronberg (born 15 August 1976) is a Swedish male hurdler of Serbian descent.

He finished 8th in the 110m hurdles final at the 2000 Olympics. He competed again in the 2004 Olympics, reaching the semi-finals. He has also been a regular competitor in the World Championships in Athletics, being present at every event since 1997. His best position has been a 5th place in the 2003 World Championships held in Edmonton.

He finished 7th in the final of the 110m hurdles at the 2002 European Athletics Championships in Munich and 5th in the final of the same event in the 2006 European Athletics Championships in Gothenburg.

Kronberg is also a Swedish national champion in inline hockey while playing for the Gothenburg Jokers.

== Competition record ==
| Year | Competition | Venue | Position | Event | Notes |
Representing Sweden
| 1994 | World Junior Championships | Lisbon, Portugal | 10th (sf) | 110 m hurdles | 14.21 (wind: +1.9 m/s) |
| 1995 | European Junior Championships | Nyíregyháza, Hungary | 2nd | 110 m hurdles | 14.16 |
| 1997 | World Indoor Championships | Paris, France | 19th (h) | 60 m hurdles | 7.79 |
| 1997 | European U23 Championships | Turku, Finland | 3rd (sf) | 110 m hurdles | 13.77 (wind: +1.6 m/s) |
| 1997 | World Championships | Athens, Greece | 27th (qf) | 110 m hurdles | 13.73 |
| 1998 | European Indoor Championships | Valencia, Spain | 22nd (h) | 60 m hurdles | 7.82 |
| 1999 | Universiade | Palma de Mallorca, Spain | 6th | 110 m hurdles | 13.80 |
| 1999 | World Championships | Seville, Spain | 22nd (qf) | 110 m hurdles | 13.56 |
| 2000 | European Indoor Championships | Ghent, Belgium | 6th | 60 m hurdles | 7.64 |
| 2000 | Olympic Games | Athens, Greece | 8th | 110 m hurdles | 13.61 |
| 2001 | World Indoor Championships | Lisbon, Portugal | 4th | 60 m hurdles | 7.57 |
| 2001 | World Championships | Edmonton, Canada | 5th | 110 m hurdles | 13.51 |
| 2001 | Universiade | Beijing, China | 3rd | 110 m hurdles | 13.40 |
| 2002 | European Indoor Championships | Vienna, Austria | 5th | 60 m hurdles | 7.67 |
| 2002 | European Championships | Munich, Germany | 7th | 110 m hurdles | 13.63 |
| 2003 | World Indoor Championships | Birmingham, United Kingdom | 7th | 60 m hurdles | 7.67 |
| 2003 | World Championships | Paris, France | 12th (sf) | 110 m hurdles | 13.60 |
| 2004 | World Indoor Championships | Budapest, Hungary | 6th | 60 m hurdles | 7.59 |
| 2004 | Olympic Games | Athens, Greece | 12th (sf) | 110 m hurdles | 13.42 |
| 2005 | European Indoor Championships | Madrid, Spain | 3rd | 60 m hurdles | 7.65 |
| 2005 | World Championships | Helsinki, Finland | 17th (sf) | 110 m hurdles | 13.69 |
| 2006 | European Championships | Gothenburg, Sweden | 5th | 110 m hurdles | 13.57 |
| 2007 | European Indoor Championships | Birmingham, United Kingdom | 7th | 60 m hurdles | 7.71 |
| 2007 | World Championships | Osaka, Japan | 14th (sf) | 110 m hurdles | 13.58 |
| 2008 | World Indoor Championships | Valencia, Spain | 13th (sf) | 60 m hurdles | 7.75 |
| 2009 | European Indoor Championships | Turin, Italy | 12th (sf) | 60 m hurdles | 7.78 |
