= Yoel Hernández (hurdler) =

Cuban hurdler (born 1977)

Personal information
- Full name: Yoel Hernández Reyes
- Born: December 12, 1977 (age 48) Manacas, Villa Clara
- Height: 1.88 m (6 ft 2 in)
- Weight: 85 kg (187 lb)

Sport
- Country: Cuba
- Sport: Athletics
Medal record
Representing Cuba
Pan American Games
Silver medal – second place	1999 Winnipeg	110m hurdles
Bronze medal – third place	2007 Rio de Janeiro	110m hurdles
Central American and Caribbean Games
Bronze medal – third place	2006 Cartagena	110m hurdles
World Junior Championships
Gold medal – first place	1996 Sydney	110m hurdles
- Updated on 28 May 2013

Yoel Hernández Reyes (born 12 December 1977 in Manacas, Villa Clara) is a Cuban track and field athlete who specialises in the 110 metres hurdles.

His personal best time is 13.24 seconds, achieved when he won the silver medal at the 1999 Pan American Games. The result places him fifth among Cuban 110 m hurdlers, behind Anier García, Dayron Robles, Emilio Valle and Alejandro Casañas.

== Achievements ==
Year	Competition	Venue	Position	Event	Notes
Representing Cuba
1994	World Junior Championships	Lisbon, Portugal	12th (sf)	110m hurdles	14.32 w (wind: +2.1 m/s)
1994	World Junior Championships	Lisbon, Portugal	—	4 × 100 m relay	DQ
1996	CAC Junior Championships (U-20)	San Salvador, El Salvador	1st	110 m hurdles	14.16 s (1.8 m/s)
1996	World Junior Championships	Sydney, Australia	1st	110 m hurdles	13.83 s (wind: +1.8 m/s)
1997	Central American and Caribbean Championships	San Juan, Puerto Rico	2nd	110 m hurdles	13.74 s w
1999	Pan American Games	Winnipeg, Canada	2nd	110 m hurdles	13.24 s (1.1 m/s) PB
1999	World Championships	Seville, Spain	6th	110 m hurdles	13.30 s (1.0 m/s)
1999	World Championships	Seville, Spain	4th	4 × 100 m relay	38.63 s
2000	Olympic Games	Sydney, Australia	5th (sf)	110 m hurdles	13.41 s (0.1 m/s)
2001	World Indoor Championships	Lisbon, Portugal	5th	60 m hurdles	7.58 s
2001	World Championships	Edmonton, Canada	4th	110 m hurdles	13.30 s (−0.3 m/s)
2003	World Indoor Championships	Birmingham, United Kingdom	22nd (h)	60 m hurdles	7.86 s
2003	World Championships	Paris, France	7th	110 m hurdles	13.57 s (0.3 m/s)
2004	World Indoor Championships	Budapest, Hungary	7th	60 m hurdles	7.78 s
2004	Ibero-American Championships	Huelva, Spain	1st	110 m hurdles	13.49 s
2004	Olympic Games	Athens, Greece	6th (sf)	110 m hurdles	13.37 s (−0.1 m/s)
2005	Central American and Caribbean Championships	Nassau, Bahamas	1st	110 m hurdles	13.32 s w
2005	Central American and Caribbean Championships	Nassau, Bahamas	4th	4 × 100 m relay	39.40 s
2005	World Championships	Helsinki, Finland	4th (sf)	110 m hurdles	13.54 s (−0.5 m/s)
2006	World Indoor Championships	Moscow, Russia	8th	60 m hurdles	7.62 s
2006	Central American and Caribbean Games	Cartagena, Colombia	3rd	110 m hurdles	13.51 s
2006	Central American and Caribbean Games	Cartagena, Colombia	4th	4 × 100 m relay	39.63 s
2007	ALBA Games	Caracas, Venezuela	1st	110 m hurdles	13.70 s (wind: +0.6 m/s)
2007	ALBA Games	Caracas, Venezuela	1st	4 × 100 m relay	39.23 s
2007	Pan American Games	Rio de Janeiro, Brazil	3rd	110 m hurdles	13.50 s (0.4 m/s)
2007	World Championships	Osaka, Japan	4th (sf)	110 m hurdles	13.37 s (−0.3 m/s)
2008	World Indoor Championships	Valencia, Spain	8th	60 m hurdles	7.91 s
