= Sven Pieters =

Belgian hurdler

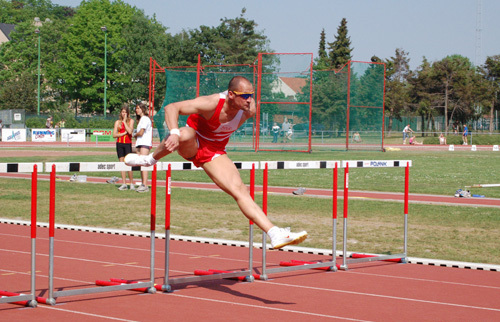
Sven Pieters

Sven Pieters (born 5 June 1976) is a former sprint hurdler from Belgium.

== Biography ==
He finished fourth in the 110m Hurdles at the 1994 World Junior Championships, then a year later won the silver medal at the European Junior Championships. He participated in the 1996 Olympic Games and the 1997 World Championships

== Achievements ==
Year	Competition	Venue	Position	Event	Notes
Representing Belgium
1994	World Junior Championships	Lisbon, Portugal	4th	110 m hurdles	14.00 w (wind: +2.1 m/s)
1995	European Junior Championships	Nyíregyháza, Hungary	1st	110 m hurdles	14.06
1996	Olympic Games	Atlanta, United States	13th (sf)	110 m hurdles	13.59
1997	European U23 Championships	Turku, Finland	2nd	110 m hurdles	13.56 w (wind: +2.2 m/s)
1997	World Championships	Athens, Greece	19th (qf)	110 m hurdles	13.55
1998	European Indoor Championships	Valencia, Spain	15th (sf)	60 m hurdles	7.77
1998	European Championships	Budapest, Hungary	12th (sf)	110 m hurdles	13.69
