= Ivan Bitzi =

Swiss hurdler

Ivan Bitzi (born 4 August 1975) is a retired Swiss athlete specializing in the high hurdles events. His personal bests are 13.52 (2005) in 110 meters hurdles and 7.62 (2002) in 60 meters hurdles.

== Competition record ==
Year	Competition	Venue	Position	Event	Notes
Representing Switzerland
1994	World Junior Championships	Lisbon, Portugal	31st (h)	110 m hurdles	15.92 (wind: +1.6 m/s)
1997	European U23 Championships	Turku, Finland	16th (sf)	110 m hurdles	14.68 (wind: +1.6 m/s)
1998	European Indoor Championships	Valencia, Spain	24th (h)	60 m hurdles	7.85
1998	European Championships	Budapest, Hungary	21st (h)	110 m hurdles	14.01
2001	Jeux de la Francophonie	Ottawa, Canada	6th	110 m hurdles	14.05
2002	European Indoor Championships	Vienna, Austria	10th (sf)	60 m hurdles	7.75
2002	European Championships	Munich, Germany	12th (sf)	110 m hurdles	13.76
2003	World Indoor Championships	Birmingham, United Kingdom	14th (sf)	60 m hurdles	7.80
2004	World Indoor Championships	Budapest, Hungary	17th (sf)	60 m hurdles	7.82
2005	European Indoor Championships	Madrid, Spain	15th (sf)	60 m hurdles	7.89
2005	World Championships	Helsinki, Finland	32nd (h)	110 m hurdles	14.26
2006	World Indoor Championships	Moscow, Russia	20th (sf)	60 m hurdles	7.85
2006	European Championships	Gothenburg, Sweden	12th (h)	110 m hurdles	13.68
