= Dudley Dorival =

Haitian hurdler

Personal information
- Born: 1 September 1975 (age 50) Elizabeth, New Jersey, United States

Sport
- Sport: Track and field
Medal record
Representing Haiti
World Athletics Championships
Bronze medal – third place	2001 Edmonton	110m hurdles
Central American and Caribbean Games
Gold medal – first place	2002 San Salvador	110m hurdles
Representing United States
Summer Universiade
Bronze medal – third place	1997 Catania	110m hurdles
World Junior Championships
Silver medal – second place	1994 Lisbon	110m hurdles

Dudley Dorival (born 1 September 1975) is a retired Haitian hurdler. He was born in Elizabeth, New Jersey, United States.

Dorival graduated from Ewing High School in 1993 and attended and competed at the University of Connecticut. He is best known for his bronze medal in 110 metres hurdles at the 2001 World Championships, which he won in a personal best time of 13.25 seconds.

Born in the United States to Haitian parents, Dorival took Haitian nationality on July 29, 1999.

He is now the Sprints and Hurdles Coach for Rider University's Track and Field team, which he helped lead to a Metro-Atlantic Athletic Conference Men's Outdoor Championship in 2010–2011.

== Achievements ==
Year	Competition	Venue	Position	Event	Notes
Representing United States
1994	World Junior Championships	Lisbon, Portugal	2nd	110 m hurdles	13.65 w (wind: +2.1 m/s)
1997	Universiade	Catania, Italy	3rd	110 m hurdles	13.53
1998	Goodwill Games	Uniondale, United States	7th	110 m hurdles	13.71
Representing Haiti
1999	World Championships	Seville, Spain	15th (sf)	110 m hurdles	13.86
2000	Olympic Games	Sydney, Australia	7th	110 m hurdles	13.49
2001	World Indoor Championships	Lisbon, Portugal	7th	60 m hurdles	7.73
2001	Jeux de la Francophonie	Ottawa, Ontario, Canada	1st	110 m hurdles	13.60
2001	World Championships	Edmonton, Canada	3rd	110 m hurdles	13.25
2001	Goodwill Games	Brisbane, Australia	7th	110 m hurdles	13.64
2002	Central American and Caribbean Games	San Salvador, El Salvador	1st	110 m hurdles	13.82 w (wind: 2.6 m/s)
2003	World Indoor Championships	Birmingham, United Kingdom	15th (sf)	60 m hurdles	7.81
2003	Pan American Games	Santo Domingo, Dom. Rep.	5th	110 m hurdles	13.48
2003	World Championships	Paris, France	11th (sf)	110 m hurdles	13.59
2004	Olympic Games	Athens, Greece	11th (sf)	110 m hurdles	13.39
2005	Central American and Caribbean Championships	Nassau, Bahamas	4th	110 m hurdles	13.50
2005	World Championships	Helsinki, Finland	23rd (sf)	110 m hurdles	14.11
2006	World Indoor Championships	Moscow, Russia	21st (sf)	60 m hurdles	7.94
2006	Central American and Caribbean Games	Cartagena, Colombia	5th	110 m hurdles	13.68
2007	Pan American Games	Rio de Janeiro, Brazil	5th (h)	110 m hurdles	13.64
2007	World Championships	Osaka, Japan	23rd (sf)	110 m hurdles	13.82
2008	Central American and Caribbean Championships	Cali, Colombia	9th (h)	110 m hurdles	14.09
2008	Olympic Games	Beijing, China	25th (qf)	110 m hurdles	13.71
