= David Payne (hurdler) =

American hurdler

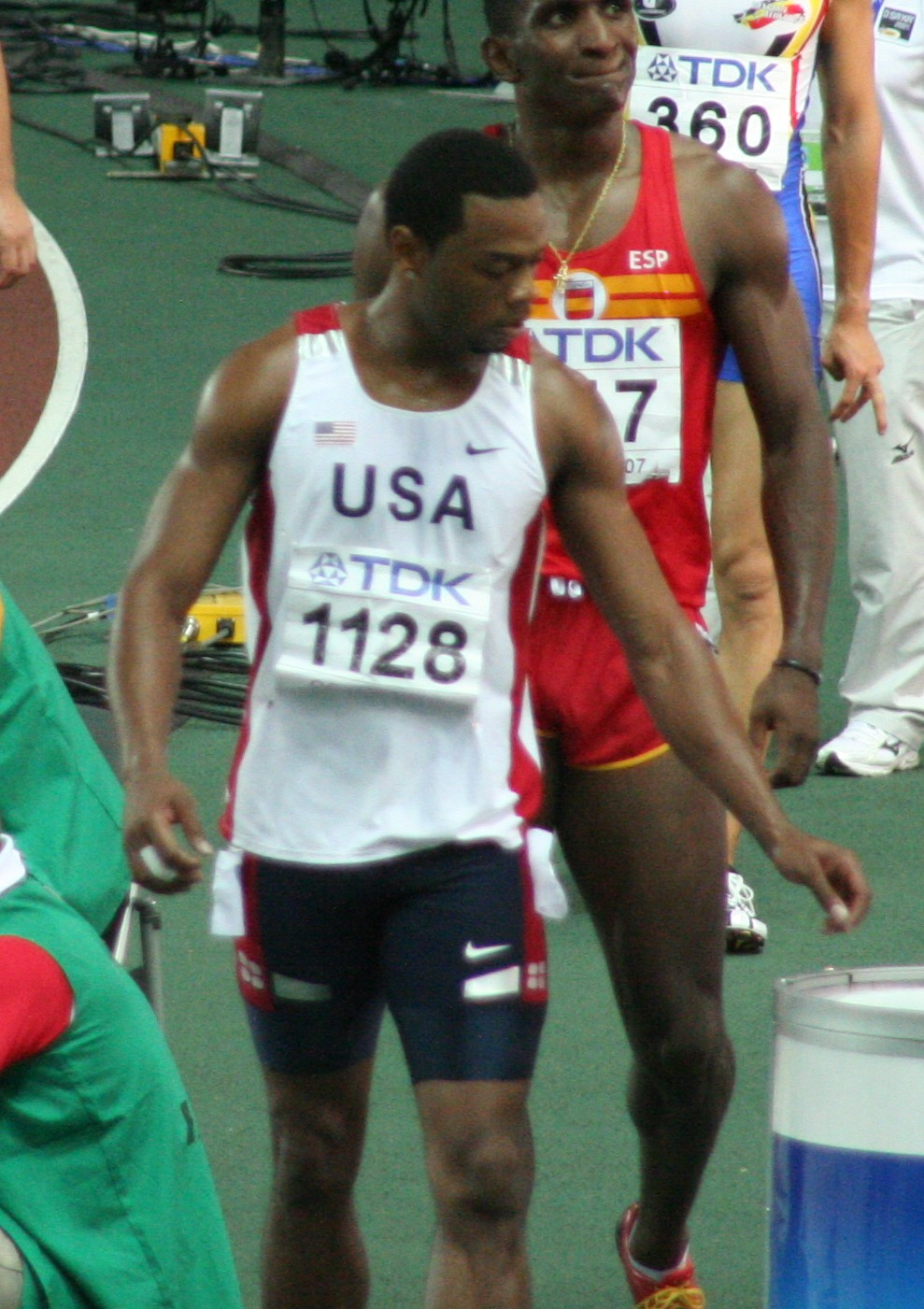
- Payne in 2007

Personal information
- Full name: David Thorn Payne
- Born: July 24, 1982 (age 44) Cincinnati, Ohio, U.S.
- Height: 6 ft 1 in (185 cm)
- Weight: 185 lb (84 kg)

Sport
- Sport: Athletics (track and field)
- Event: 110 m hurdles
- College team: University of Cincinnati Bearcats

Achievements and titles
- Personal best: 110 m hurdles: 13.02
Medal record
Men's athletics
Representing the United States
Olympic Games
Silver medal – second place	2008 Beijing	110 m hurdles
World Championships
Bronze medal – third place	2007 Osaka	110 m hurdles
Bronze medal – third place	2009 Berlin	110 m hurdles
Pan American Games
Silver medal – second place	2007 Rio de Janeiro	110 m hurdles

David Thorn Payne (born July 24, 1982) is an American hurdler. He was born in Cincinnati and his family moved to the suburb of Wyoming in Ohio. Payne competed in the 110 and 400 meter hurdles while attending the University of Cincinnati. While at UC, Payne won multiple individual titles in Conference USA and was named Conference USA Outdoor Athlete of the Year while guiding the Bearcats to the C-USA 2004 outdoor title. He set school records for both distances and was a two time NCAA All-American in the 110m hurdles. Payne now resides in Northern Kentucky and trains in Cincinnati, Ohio.

In 2007 he won the silver medal at the Pan American Games behind Dayron Robles, and the bronze medal at the 2007 World Championships, the latter in a personal best time of 13.02 seconds. This feat was especially surprising since Payne was filling in, as an alternate, for the injured American record holder, Dominique Arnold, and had only arrived in Japan from the U.S. less than 24 hours before he was to race.

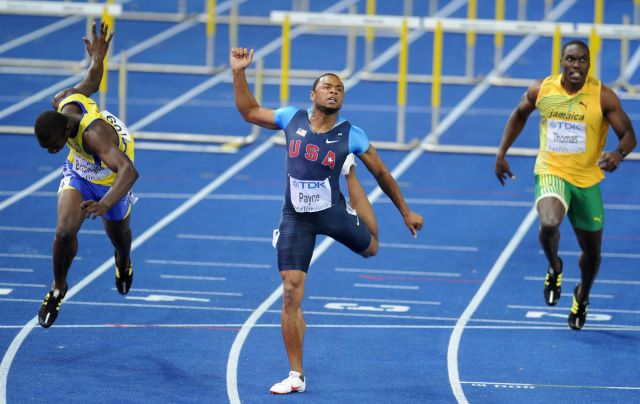
Payne competing at the 2009 World Championships in Berlin

Payne grabbed the final qualifying spot for the Beijing Olympics at the 2008 Outdoor National Championships. At the 2008 Olympics in Beijing, China, Payne continued his ascent in the track and field world and won a silver medal in the 110m hurdles in a season best time of 13.17 seconds. World record holder Dayron Robles, of Cuba, won the gold.

In 2009, after sitting out most of the indoor season, Payne returned to Olympic form during the outdoor season capturing the 2009 USATF National Championship in the 110m hurdles, a feat which qualified him for the 2009 World Championships in Berlin, Germany. In a photo finish, Payne edged out fellow 2008 Olympian, 2007 World Silver Medalist, and former 110m hurdle National Champion Terrence Trammell by 0.003 of a second with a winning time of 13.115. Again, Payne surprised many by overtaking Trammell in the final steps although Trammell led coming off the final hurdle and was thought by the announcers to have won.
