= Felipe Vivancos =

Spanish hurdler

Personal information
- Born: 16 June 1980 (age 46) Ibiza, Islas Baleares, Spain
Medal record
Men's Athletics
Representing Spain
Mediterranean Games
| Gold medal – first place | 2005 Almería | 110 m hurdles |
European Athletics Indoor Championships
| Silver medal – second place | 2005 Madrid | 60 m hurdles |

Felipe Vivancos Ruiz (born 16 June 1980 in Ibiza, Islas Baleares) is a Spanish hurdler. He won the gold medal at the 2005 Mediterranean Games in Almería, Spain.

Vivancos finished fifth at the 2002 IAAF World Cup and won the silver medal in 60 metres hurdles at the 2005 European Indoor Championships. He also competed at the World Championships in 2001 and 2005 as well as the 2004 Olympic Games without reaching the final round.

His personal best time is 13.41 seconds, achieved in July 2006 in Zaragoza. The Spanish record currently belongs to Jackson Quiñónez with 13.34 seconds.

== Competition record ==
| Year | Competition | Venue | Position | Event | Notes |
Representing Spain
| 1998 | World Junior Championships | Annecy, France | 24th (q) | 110 m hurdles | 14.74 (wind: -0.8 m/s) |
| 1999 | European Junior Championships | Riga, Latvia | 1st | 110 m hurdles | 13.92 |
| 2001 | European U23 Championships | Amsterdam, Netherlands | 2nd | 110 m hurdles | 13.79 (wind: 0.4 m/s) |
| 2001 | World Championships | Edmonton, Canada | 26th (h) | 110 m hurdles | 13.84 |
| 2002 | European Championships | Munich, Germany | 17th (h) | 110 m hurdles | 13.84 |
| 2003 | World Indoor Championships | Birmingham, United Kingdom | 16th (sf) | 60 m hurdles | 7.81 |
| 2004 | World Indoor Championships | Budapest, Hungary | 22nd (h) | 60 m hurdles | 7.79 |
| 2004 | Ibero-American Championships | Huelva, Spain | 5th | 110 m hurdles | 13.82 |
| 2004 | Olympic Games | Athens, Greece | 14th (sf) | 110 m hurdles | 13.52 |
| 2005 | European Indoor Championships | Madrid, Spain | 2nd | 60 m hurdles | 7.61 |
| 2005 | Mediterranean Games | Almería, Spain | 1st | 110 m hurdles | 13.53 |
| 2005 | World Championships | Helsinki, Finland | 34th (h) | 110 m hurdles | 14.34 |
| 2006 | European Championships | Gothenburg, Sweden | 18th (h) | 110 m hurdles | 13.75 |
| 2007 | World Championships | Osaka, Japan | – | 110 m hurdles | DQ |
| 2009 | World Championships | Berlin, Germany | 30th (h) | 110 m hurdles | 13.72 |
| 2010 | World Indoor Championships | Doha, Qatar | 4th (h) | 60 m hurdles | 7.67 |
| 2010 | Ibero-American Championships | San Fernando, Spain | 5th | 110 m hurdles | 13.94 |
| 2010 | European Championships | Barcelona, Spain | 18th (h) | 110 m hurdles | 13.82 |
| 2011 | European Indoor Championships | Paris, France | 4th | 60 m hurdles | 7.59 |
