= Masato Naito =

Japanese hurdler (born 1980)

Masato Naitō
Personal information
- Nationality: Japan
- Born: 31 July 1980 (age 46) Toyota, Aichi, Japan
- Education: Hosei University
- Height: 1.85 m (6 ft 1 in)
- Weight: 75 kg (165 lb)

Sport
- Sport: Track and field
- Events: 110 m hurdles 60 m hurdles
- Retired: 2012

Achievements and titles
- Personal bests: 110 m hurdles: 13.43 (Kumagaya 2007); 60 m hurdles: 7.75 (Valencia 2008)
Medal record
Men's athletics
Representing Japan
Asian Games
Bronze medal – third place	2006 Doha	110 m hurdles
Afro-Asian Games
Silver medal – second place	2003 Hyderabad	110 m hurdles

Masato Naitō (内藤 真人, Naitō Masato; born 31 July 1980 in Toyota, Aichi, Japan) is a retired Japanese hurdler. He is the former national record holder for the 110 metres hurdles and 60 metres hurdles.

He finished fourth at the 2005 Asian Championships and third at the 2006 Asian Games. He also competed at the World Championships in 2001, 2003 and 2005 as well as the 2004 Olympic Games without reaching the final round.

His personal best time is 13.43 seconds in the 110 metres hurdles (Kumagaya 2008) and 7.75 seconds in the 60 metres hurdles (Valencia 2008). The latter is the former national record.

He retired after the 2012 season.

== Personal bests ==
Event	Time (s)	Wind (m/s)	Competition	Venue	Date	Notes
110 m hurdles	13.43	+1.7	East Japan Corporate Championships	Kumagaya, Japan	20 May 2007	
60 m hurdles	7.75	Indoor	World Indoor Championships	Valencia, Spain	8 March 2008	Former NR

== Competition record ==
Year	Competition	Venue	Position	Event	Notes
Representing Japan
1999	Asian Junior Championships	Singapore	– (h)	110 m hurdles	DNF
2001	World Championships	Edmonton, Canada	19th (sf)	110 m hurdles	13.73
2001	Universiade	Beijing, China	–	110 m hurdles	DQ
2002	Asian Championships	Colombo, Sri Lanka	7th	110 m hurdles	14.54
2003	World Championships	Paris, France	15th (sf)	110 m hurdles	13.68
2003	Afro-Asian Games	Hyderabad, India	2nd	110 m hurdles	13.71
2004	World Indoor Championships	Budapest, Hungary	19th (h)	60 m hurdles	7.77
2004	Olympic Games	Athens, Greece	19th (qf)	110 m hurdles	13.54
2005	World Championships	Helsinki, Finland	20th (sf)	110 m hurdles	13.88
2005	Asian Championships	Incheon, South Korea	4th	110 m hurdles	13.90
2006	World Indoor Championships	Moscow, Russia	19th (sf)	60 m hurdles	7.82
2006	Asian Games	Doha, Qatar	3rd	110 m hurdles	13.60
2007	World Championships	Osaka, Japan	14th (sf)	110 m hurdles	13.58
2008	World Indoor Championships	Valencia, Spain	18th (sf)	60 m hurdles	7.85
2008	Olympic Games	Beijing, China	37th (h)	110 m hurdles	13.96

== National titles ==
- Japanese Championships
  - 110 m hurdles: 2001, 2005, 2006, 2007, 2008
