= Paulo Villar =

Colombian hurdler (born 1978)

Personal information
- Full name: Paulo César Villar Nieto
- Born: 28 July 1978 (age 48) Santa Marta, Magdalena, Colombia
- Height: 1.83 m (6 ft 0 in)
- Weight: 73 kg (161 lb)

Sport
- Country: Colombia
- Sport: Men's Athletics
- Club: Atlantic League, Antioquia
Medal record
Men's athletics
Representing Colombia
Pan American Games
Silver medal – second place	2011 Guadalajara	110 m hurdles
Bolivarian Games
Gold medal – first place	2001 Ambato	110 m hurdles
Gold medal – first place	2005 Armenia	110 m hurdles
Gold medal – first place	2005 Armenia	400 m hurdles
Gold medal – first place	2009 Sucre	110 m hurdles
Gold medal – first place	2009 Sucre	4x100 m relay
Silver medal – second place	2013 Trujillo	110 m hurdles
Bronze medal – third place	2013 Trujillo	400 m hurdles
- Updated on 11 June 2014

Paulo César Villar Nieto (born 28 July 1978) is a Colombian hurdling athlete.

At the 2006 Central American and Caribbean Games he finished second in 13.29 seconds, equalling the South American record of Brazilian Redelén dos Santos as well as establishing a new national record.

== Personal bests ==
- 100 m: 10.69 s (wind: +1.4 m/s) – Medellín, Colombia, 25 April 2009
- 200 m: 21.29 s (wind: NWI) – Bogotá, Colombia, 13 August 2006
- 110 m hurdles: 13.27 s (wind: +1.6 m/s) – Guadalajara, Mexico, 28 October 2011
- 400 m hurdles: 50.34 s – Trujillo, Peru, 28 November 2013

== Achievements ==
Year	Competition	Venue	Position	Event	Notes
Representing Colombia
1996	South American Junior Championships	Bucaramanga, Colombia	2nd	110 m H	14.8
1997	South American Junior Championships	San Carlos, Uruguay	2nd	110 m H	15.39
1997	South American Junior Championships	San Carlos, Uruguay	3rd	400 m H	55.74
1999	South American Championships	Bogotá, Colombia	2nd	110 m H	14.31 A
1999	Universiade	Palma, Spain	5th (h)	110 m H	14.20 (w)
1999	Universiade	Palma, Spain	30th (h)	400 m H	52.79
2001	South American Championships	Manaus, Brazil	3rd	110 m H	13.88
2001	World Championships	Edmonton, Canada	25th (h)	110 m H	13.82
2001	Bolivarian Games	Ambato, Ecuador	1st	110 m H	13.58 A
2002	Ibero-American Championships	Guatemala City, Guatemala	1st	110 m H	13.57
2002	Central American and Caribbean Games	San Salvador, El Salvador	2nd	110 m H	13.94 w (+2.6 m/s)
2003	South American Championships	Barquisimeto, Venezuela	4th	110 m H	14.12
2003	South American Championships	Barquisimeto, Venezuela	6th	4 × 100 m	40.73
2003	Pan American Games	Santo Domingo, Dominican Republic	11th (h)	110 m H	13.81
2004	Ibero-American Championships	Huelva, Spain	4th	110 m H	13.64
2004	Olympic Games	Athens, Greece	29th (qf)	110 m H	14.03
2005	South American Championships	Cali, Colombia	2nd	110 m H	13.49 w
2005	World Championships	Helsinki, Finland	25th (h)	110 m H	14.12
2005	Bolivarian Games	Armenia, Colombia	1st	110 m H	13.44 (-0.1 m/s) GR A
2005	Bolivarian Games	Armenia, Colombia	1st	400 m H	50.61 A
2006	World Indoor Championships	Moscow, Russia	7th	60 m H	7.61 (NRi)
2006	Central American and Caribbean Games	Cartagena, Colombia	2nd	110 m H	13.29 (NR, =AR)
2006	South American Championships	Tunja, Colombia	1st	110 m H	13.62
2006	South American Championships	Tunja, Colombia	2nd	4 × 100 m	40.17
2008	World Indoor Championships	Valencia, Spain	17th (sf)	60 m H	7.81
2008	Ibero-American Championships	Iquique, Chile	1st	110 m H	13.74
2008	Central American and Caribbean Championships	Cali, Colombia	2nd	110 m H	13.45
2008	Olympic Games	Beijing, China	16th (sf)	110 m H	13.85
2009	South American Championships	Lima, Peru	1st	110 m H	13.89
2009	World Championships	Berlin, Germany	11th (sf)	110 m H	13.44
2009	Bolivarian Games	Sucre, Bolivia	1st	110 m H	13.64 A
2009	Bolivarian Games	Sucre, Bolivia	1st	4 × 100 m	39.25 GR A
2010	World Indoor Championships	Doha, Qatar	–	60 m H	DQ
2010	Central American and Caribbean Games	Mayagüez, Puerto Rico	8th	110 m H	20.10
2011	South American Championships	Buenos Aires, Argentina	3rd	110 m H	13.85
2011	Central American and Caribbean Championships	Mayagüez, Puerto Rico	3rd	110 m H	13.60
2011	World Championships	Daegu, South Korea	13th (sf)	110 m H	13.73
2011	Pan American Games	Guadalajara, Mexico	2nd	110 m H	13.27 (NR)
2012	Ibero-American Championships	Barquisimeto, Venezuela	5th	110 m H	13.97
2012	Olympic Games	London, United Kingdom	20th (sf)	110 m H	13.63
2013	Bolivarian Games	Trujillo, Peru	2nd	110 m H	13.80 (-0.4 m/s)
2013	Bolivarian Games	Trujillo, Peru	3rd	400 m H	50.34
