= David Ilariani =

Georgian sprinter

David Ilariani (Georgian: დავით ილარიანი; born 20 January 1981 in Tbilisi) is a Georgian sprinter. He competed in the 110 m hurdles event at the 2004, 2008 and 2012 Summer Olympics.

== Competition record ==
Year	Competition	Venue	Position	Event	Notes
Representing Georgia
2000	World Junior Championships	Santiago, Chile	–	110 m hurdles	DQ
2001	World Indoor Championships	Lisbon, Portugal	20th (h)	60 m hurdles	8.23
2001	World Championships	Edmonton, Canada	36th (h)	110 m hurdles	14.08
2002	European Championships	Munich, Germany	–	110 m hurdles	DNF
2003	World Indoor Championships	Birmingham, United Kingdom	–	60 m hurdles	DNF
2003	European U23 Championships	Bydgoszcz, Poland	9th (sf)	110 m hurdles	13.75
2003	World Championships	Paris, France	26th (h)	110 m hurdles	14.88
2004	Olympic Games	Athens, Greece	34th (h)	110 m hurdles	13.72
2005	European Indoor Championships	Madrid, Spain	14th (sf)	60 m hurdles	7.81
2005	World Championships	Helsinki, Finland	42nd (h)	110 m hurdles	14.88
2006	World Indoor Championships	Moscow, Russia	25th (h)	60 m hurdles	7.86
2007	European Indoor Championships	Birmingham, United Kingdom	21st (h)	60 m hurdles	7.98
2007	World Championships	Osaka, Japan	32nd (h)	110 m hurdles	13.82
2008	Olympic Games	Beijing, China	28th (qf)	110 m hurdles	13.74
2009	European Indoor Championships	Turin, Italy	–	60 m hurdles	DQ
2009	World Championships	Berlin, Germany	39th (h)	110 m hurdles	13.86
2012	European Championships	Helsinki, Finland	23rd (sf)	110 m hurdles	13.88
2012	Olympic Games	London, United Kingdom	39th (h)	110 m hurdles	13.90

== Personal bests ==
Outdoor

- 110 metres hurdles – 13.58 (+1.8 m/s) (Sliven 2012) NR
- Long jump – 7.78 m (+1.9 m/s) (Tsakhkadzor 2003)

Indoor

- 60 metres hurdles – 7.77 (Madrid 2005)
- Long jump – 7.37 m (Kyiv 2005)
