= Andrey Kislykh =

Russian hurdler (born 1976)

Personal information
- Born: 24 November 1976 (age 49) Kemerovo, Soviet Union

Sport
- Sport: Track and field
Medal record
Representing Russia
Summer Universiade
Gold medal – first place	1997 Catania	110m hurdles

Andrey Gennadyevich Kislykh (Russian: Андре́й Генна́дьевич Ки́слых; born 24 November 1976) is a Russian former hurdler who competed in the 1996 Summer Olympics and in the 2000 Summer Olympics.

== Competition record ==
Year	Competition	Venue	Position	Event	Time	Notes
Representing Russia
1994	World Junior Championships	Lisbon, Portugal	6th	110 m hurdles	14.21	w (wind: +2.1 m/s)
1995	European Junior Championships	Nyíregyháza, Hungary	5th	110 m hurdles	14.21	
1995	European Junior Championships	Nyíregyháza, Hungary	2nd	Long jump	7.76 m	
1996	European Indoor Championships	Stockholm, Sweden	5th	60 m hurdles	7.72	
1996	Olympic Games	Atlanta, United States	26th (qf)	110 m hurdles	13.74	
1997	World Indoor Championships	Paris, France	10th (sf)	60 m hurdles	7.74	
1997	European U23 Championships	Turku, Finland	3rd	110 m hurdles	13.56	w (wind: +2.2 m/s)
1997	World Championships	Athens, Greece	14th (sf)	110 m hurdles	13.78	
1997	Universiade	Catania, Italy	1st	110 m hurdles	13.44	
1999	Universiade	Palma de Mallorca, Spain	10th (sf)	110 m hurdles	13.96	
1999	World Championships	Seville, Spain	34th (h)	110 m hurdles	13.83	
2000	European Indoor Championships	Ghent, Belgium	10th (sf)	60 m hurdles	7.70	
2000	Olympic Games	Sydney, Australia	26th (qf)	110 m hurdles	14.03	
2002	European Championships	Munich, Germany	14th (sf)	110 m hurdles	13.89	
2003	World Indoor Championships	Birmingham, United Kingdom	24th (h)	60 m hurdles	7.90	
