= Chris Pinnock =

Jamaican hurdler

Personal information
- Born: 26 March 1979 (age 47) Clarendon Park, Jamaica

Sport
- Sport: Track and field

Christopher Lyndon "Chris" Pinnock (born 26 March 1979) is a Jamaican hurdler.

Pinnock competed for the Texas A&M Aggies track and field team in the NCAA.

He finished fifth at the 2006 Commonwealth Games. He also competed at the World Championships in 2003 and 2005 as well as the 2004 Olympic Games without reaching the final round.

His personal best time is 13.38 seconds, achieved in May 2003 in Austin. The national record belongs to Maurice Wignall with 13.17 seconds.
