= Oleg Normatov =

Uzbekistani hurdler

Personal information
- Nationality: Uzbekistan
- Born: 4 September 1981 (age 44) Tashkent, Uzbek SSR
- Height: 1.90 m (6 ft 3 in)
- Weight: 85 kg (187 lb)

Sport
- Sport: Athletics
- Event: 110 metres hurdles

Achievements and titles
- Personal best: 110 m hurdles: 13.71 s (2008)

Oleg Normatov (Uzbek: Олег Норматов; born September 4, 1981, in Tashkent) is an Uzbekistani sprint hurdler. Normatov represented Uzbekistan at the 2008 Summer Olympics in Beijing, where he competed for the 110 m hurdles. He ran in the first heat against six other athletes, including Cuban sprint hurdler and world-record holder Dayron Robles, who eventually won the gold medal in the final. He finished the sprint race in sixth place by one tenths of a second behind Russia's Evgeniy Borisov, with a time of 14.00 seconds. Normatov, however, failed to advance into the quarterfinals, as he placed thirty-eighth overall, and was ranked below four mandatory slots for the next round.
