= Valery Sedoc =

Dutch footballer (born 1985)

Personal information
- Date of birth: 4 September 1985 (age 41)
- Place of birth: Amsterdam, Netherlands
- Height: 1.68 m (5 ft 6 in)
- Position: Right back

Youth career
- AFC
- Ajax
- ASC Waterwijk
- Omniworld
- 2001–2003: Groningen

Senior career*
Years	Team	Apps	(Gls)
2003–2006	Groningen	7	(0)
2006–2007	Harkemase Boys		
2007–2014	Velocitas		
- * Club domestic league appearances and goals

Valery Sedoc (born 4 September 1985) is a Dutch former professional footballer. He most notably played for Eredivisie club Groningen between 2003 and 2006, making 7 appearances.

== Career ==
Sedoc grew up in a family of athletes. His father Roy Sedoc is a Dutch former athlete who became multiple Dutch champion in the long jump and triple jump disciplines. His brothers Gregory, Jermaine, Randy are also athletes.

Sedoc played professionally for Groningen where he made his debut on 9 May 2004 in a 2–0 away loss to Utrecht. Before that he played in the youth academies of Omniworld and Ajax. He played a total of seven Eredivisie matches at Groningen in three seasons, struggling to gain playing time due to being a backup to Groningen key player, Bruno Silva.

After his professional career ended he played for a number of amateur clubs. First a season with Hoofdklasse club Harkemase Boys before moving to Velocitas, where he played until 2014.

Sedoc later became a youth coach, and established the Sedoc Voetbalschool in Groningen.
