= Serhiy Demydyuk =

Ukrainian hurdler (born 1982)

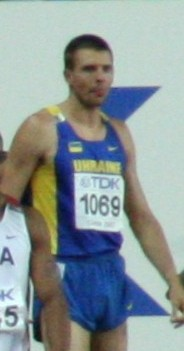
Serhiy Demydyuk in 2007

Serhiy Demydyuk (born June 5, 1982) is a Ukrainian hurdler.

== Career ==
He won a bronze medal at the 2003 Summer Universiade, and competed at the 2004 Olympics where he was knocked out in the heats. He finished eighth in the 110 m hurdles final at the 2006 European Athletics Championships, and fifth in 60 m hurdles at the 2007 European Indoor Championships.

His personal best time is 13.22 seconds, achieved in August 2007 in Osaka (6th in World Champs).

== Competition record ==
Year	Competition	Venue	Position	Event	Notes
Representing Ukraine
2003	European U23 Championships	Bydgoszcz, Poland	11th (sf)	110 m hurdles	13.92 (wind: 1.9 m/s)
2004	World Indoor Championships	Budapest, Hungary	20th (h)	60 m hurdles	7.78
2004	Olympic Games	Athens, Greece	39th (h)	110 m hurdles	13.80
2005	European Indoor Championships	Madrid, Spain	13th (h)	60 m hurdles	7.80
2005	World Championships	Helsinki, Finland	30th (h)	110 m hurdles	14.25
2005	Universiade	İzmir, Turkey	3rd	110 m hurdles	13.69
2006	World Indoor Championships	Moscow, Russia	23rd (h)	60 m hurdles	8.03
2006	European Championships	Gothenburg, Sweden	8th	110 m hurdles	13.96
2007	European Indoor Championships	Birmingham, United Kingdom	5th	60 m hurdles	7.68
2007	Universiade	Bangkok, Thailand	1st	110 m hurdles	13.33
2007	World Championships	Osaka, Japan	6th	110 m hurdles	13.22 (NR)
2009	World Championships	Berlin, Germany	29th (h)	110 m hurdles	13.71
