= Philippe Lamine =

French hurdler

Personal information
- Born: 4 October 1976 (age 50) Lyon, France

Sport
- Sport: Track and field

Philippe Lamine (born 4 October 1976) is a retired French athlete who specialised in the 110 metres hurdles. Lamine competed at the 1997 IAAF World Indoor Championships in Paris.

He has personal bests of 13.75 seconds in the 110 metres hurdles (Bron 2000) and 7.63 seconds in the 60 metres hurdles (Liévin 2000).

== Competition record ==
Year	Competition	Venue	Position	Event	Notes
Representing France
1994	World Junior Championships	Lisbon, Portugal	20th (h)	110 m hurdles	14.39 (wind: +1.4 m/s)
1995	European Junior Championships	Nyíregyháza, Hungary	4th	110 m hurdles	14.20
1997	World Indoor Championships	Paris, France	11th (sf)	60 m hurdles	7.76
1997	European U23 Championships	Turku, Finland	21st (h)	110 m hurdles	16.63 (wind: +0.3 m/s)
1999	Universiade	Palma de Mallorca, Spain	15th (sf)	110 m hurdles	14.13
2000	European Indoor Championships	Ghent, Belgium	15th (sf)	60 m hurdles	7.89
2001	Jeux de la Francophonie	Radès, Tunisia	10th (h)	110 m hurdles	14.16
2003	Universiade	Daegu, South Korea	4th	110 m hurdles	14.01
