= 1994 World Junior Championships in Athletics – Men's 110 metres hurdles =

The men's 110 metres hurdles event at the 1994 World Junior Championships in Athletics was held in Lisbon, Portugal, at Estádio Universitário de Lisboa on 21 and 22 July. 106.7 cm (3'6) (senior implement) hurdles were used.

== Medalists ==
Gold	Frank Busemann; Germany
Silver	Dudley Dorival; United States
Bronze	Darius Pemberton; United States

== Results ==
=== Final ===
22 July
Wind: +2.1 m/s

Rank	Name	Nationality	Time	Notes
1st place, gold medalist(s)	Frank Busemann	Germany	13.47 w	
2nd place, silver medalist(s)	Dudley Dorival	United States	13.65 w	
3rd place, bronze medalist(s)	Darius Pemberton	United States	13.93 w	
4	Sven Pieters	Belgium	14.00 w	
5	Anier García	Cuba	14.05 w	
6	Andrey Kislykh	Russia	14.21 w	
7	Filip Bickel	Germany	14.23 w	
8	Andrey Vinnitskiy	Ukraine	14.31 w	

=== Semifinals ===
21 July

==== Semifinal 1 ====
Wind: +1.9 m/s

Rank	Name	Nationality	Time	Notes
1	Dudley Dorival	United States	14.05	Q
2	Sven Pieters	Belgium	14.06	Q
3	Filip Bickel	Germany	14.08	Q
4	Anier García	Cuba	14.11	Q
5	James Archampong	United Kingdom	14.18	
6	Robert Kronberg	Sweden	14.21	
7	Daniel Scheidegger	Switzerland	14.52	
	Adrian Woodley	Canada	DNF	

==== Semifinal 2 ====
Wind: +2.1 m/s

Rank	Name	Nationality	Time	Notes
1	Frank Busemann	Germany	13.70 w	Q
2	Andrey Kislykh	Russia	14.14 w	Q
3	Darius Pemberton	United States	14.14 w	Q
4	Andrey Vinnitskiy	Ukraine	14.20 w	Q
5	John Whelan	Ireland	14.23 w	
6	Yoel Hernández	Cuba	14.32 w	
7	Emerson Perin	Brazil	14.35 w	
8	Dion Trowers	Canada	14.90 w	

=== Heats ===
21 July

==== Heat 1 ====
Wind: +1.6 m/s

Rank	Name	Nationality	Time	Notes
1	Dudley Dorival	United States	13.85	Q
2	Sven Pieters	Belgium	14.09	Q
3	Robert Kronberg	Sweden	14.24	q
4	Andrey Sklyarenko	Kazakhstan	14.38	
5	Wu Jincheng	China	14.44	
6	Nobuto Watanabe	Japan	14.55	
7	Ivan Bitzi	Switzerland	15.92	

==== Heat 2 ====
Wind: +1.4 m/s

Rank	Name	Nationality	Time	Notes
1	Filip Bickel	Germany	14.06	Q
2	Dion Trowers	Canada	14.28	Q
3	Darius Pemberton	United States	14.29	q
4	Yasunori Yoshioka	Japan	14.35	
5	James Goodwin	Australia	14.47	
	Robert Jarabek	Slovakia	DNF	
	Javier Vega	Spain	DNF	

==== Heat 3 ====
Wind: +1.6 m/s

Rank	Name	Nationality	Time	Notes
1	Anier García	Cuba	14.02	Q
2	Andrey Kislykh	Russia	14.03	Q
3	John Whelan	Ireland	14.24	q
4	David Rodríguez	Spain	14.36	
5	Jevone Williams	Bahamas	14.79	
6	José Carmona	Puerto Rico	14.98	
	Chris Shute	Australia	DNF	

==== Heat 4 ====
Wind: +1.7 m/s

Rank	Name	Nationality	Time	Notes
1	Frank Busemann	Germany	13.69	Q
2	Andrey Vinnitskiy	Ukraine	14.15	Q
3	Yoel Hernández	Cuba	14.20	q
4	Daniel Scheidegger	Switzerland	14.26	q
5	Simon McAree	United Kingdom	14.43	
6	Samir Bouabcha	Algeria	15.04	

==== Heat 5 ====
Wind: +1.4 m/s

Rank	Name	Nationality	Time	Notes
1	Emerson Perin	Brazil	14.27	Q
2	Adrian Woodley	Canada	14.28	Q
3	James Archampong	United Kingdom	14.31	q
4	Philippe Lamine	France	14.39	
5	Chen Chung-Hsiang	Chinese Taipei	14.51	
6	Gabriel Burnett	Barbados	14.62	
7	Alin Larion	Romania	14.70	

== Participation ==
According to an unofficial count, 34 athletes from 25 countries participated in the event.

- Algeria (1)
- Australia (2)
- Bahamas (1)
- Barbados (1)
- Belgium (1)
- Brazil (1)
- Canada (2)
- China (1)
- Chinese Taipei (1)
- Cuba (2)
- France (1)
- Germany (2)
- Ireland (1)
- Japan (2)
- Kazakhstan (1)
- Puerto Rico (1)
- Romania (1)
- Russia (1)
- Slovakia (1)
- Spain (2)
- Sweden (1)
- Switzerland (2)
- Ukraine (1)
- United Kingdom (2)
- United States (2)
