= Anselmo da Silva =

Brazilian hurdler

Personal information
- Born: 22 March 1981 (age 45) Guarulhos, São Paulo, Brazil

Sport
- Sport: Track and field
Medal record
Representing Brazil
Summer Universiade
Gold medal – first place	2003 Daegu	110m hurdles
Bronze medal – third place	2007 Bangkok	110m hurdles

Anselmo Gomes da Silva (born 22 March 1981) is a Brazilian former hurdler who competed in the 2008 Summer Olympics. His personal best in the 110 metres hurdles is 13.31 achieved in 2005 in Cochabamba.

== Competition record ==
Year	Competition	Venue	Position	Event	Notes
Representing Brazil
2000	World Junior Championships	Santiago, Chile	13th (sf)	110m hurdles	14.40 (wind: -0.3 m/s)
2002	Ibero-American Championships	Guatemala City, Guatemala	3rd	110 m hurdles	13.66
2003	World Indoor Championships	Birmingham, United Kingdom	23rd (h)	60 m hurdles	7.87
2003	Universiade	Daegu, South Korea	1st	110 m hurdles	13.68
2005	World Championships	Helsinki, Finland	13th (sf)	110 m hurdles	13.63
2006	Ibero-American Championships	Ponce, Puerto Rico	1st	110 m hurdles	13.51
2006	Ibero-American Championships	Ponce, Puerto Rico	2nd	4 × 100 m relay	40.52
2006	South American Championships	Tunja, Colombia	2nd	110 m hurdles	13.78
2007	South American Championships	São Paulo, Brazil	1st	110 m hurdles	13.56
2007	Pan American Games	Rio de Janeiro, Brazil	5th	110 m hurdles	13.72
2007	Universiade	Bangkok, Thailand	3rd	110 m hurdles	13.58
2007	World Championships	Osaka, Japan	13th (sf)	110 m hurdles	13.53
2008	World Indoor Championships	Valencia, Spain	21st (sf)	60 m hurdles	7.94
2008	Olympic Games	Beijing, China	30th (qf)	110 m hurdles	13.84
2009	South American Championships	Lima, Peru	3rd	110 m hurdles	14.12
2009	Lusophony Games	Lisbon, Portugal	1st	110 m hurdles	13.97
2010	Ibero-American Championships	San Fernando, Spain	3rd	110 m hurdles	13.82
