= Cédric Lavanne =

French hurdler

Cédric Lavanne (born 13 November 1980 in Pointe-à-Pitre, Guadeloupe) is a French athlete who specialises in the 110 meter hurdles and 60 meter hurdles . Lavanne competed at the 2003 IAAF World Indoor Championships and the 2006 IAAF World Indoor Championships.

== Competition record ==
Year	Competition	Venue	Position	Event	Notes
Representing France
1999	European Junior Championships	Riga, Latvia	6th	110 m hurdles	14.17 (w)
2001	European U23 Championships	Amsterdam, Netherlands	6th	110 m hurdles	13.96 (wind: 0.4 m/s)
2001	Mediterranean Games	Radès, Tunisia	5th	110 m hurdles	13.95
2002	European Championships	Munich, Germany	10th (sf)	110 m hurdles	13.68
2003	World Indoor Championships	Birmingham, United Kingdom	11th (sf)	60 m hurdles	7.71
2005	European Indoor Championships	Madrid, Spain	10th (sf)	60 m hurdles	7.74
2005	Mediterranean Games	Almería, Spain	5th	110 m hurdles	13.76
2005	World Championships	Helsinki, Finland	38th (h)	110 m hurdles	14.49
2005	Jeux de la Francophonie	Niamey, Niger	1st	110 m hurdles	13.68
2006	World Indoor Championships	Moscow, Russia	24th (h)	60 m hurdles	7.85
2006	European Championships	Gothenburg, Sweden	8th (sf)	110 m hurdles	13.63
2007	European Indoor Championships	Birmingham, United Kingdom	14th (h)	60 m hurdles	7.88
2009	Mediterranean Games	Pescara, Italy	7th	110 m hurdles	14.17
2009	World Championships	Berlin, Germany	30th (h)	110 m hurdles	13.72
