= Frank Busemann =

German decathlete (born 1975)

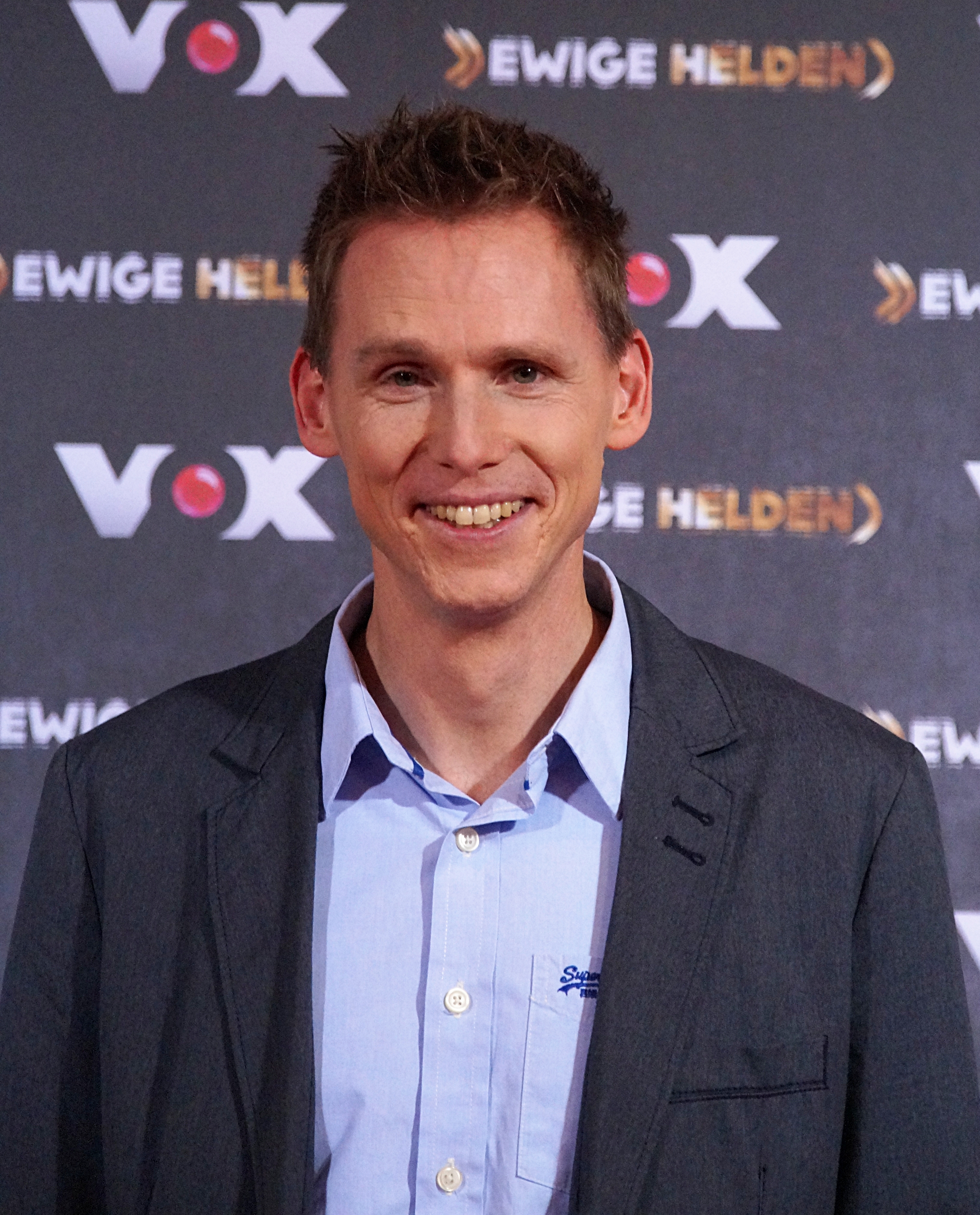
- Busemann in 2015

Personal information
- Born: 26 February 1975 (age 51) Recklinghausen, West Germany
Medal record
Men's athletics
Representing Germany
Olympic Games
Silver medal – second place	1996 Atlanta	Decathlon
World Championships
Bronze medal – third place	1997 Athens	Decathlon
World Junior Championships
Gold medal – first place	1994 Lisbon	110 m hurdles
European U23 Championships
Gold medal – first place	1997 Turku	110 m hurdles

Frank Busemann (German pronunciation: [fʁaŋk ˈbuːzəˌman]; born 26 February 1975 in Recklinghausen) is a former German decathlete. He currently works as a pundit for athletics coverage by German TV channel Das Erste.

Busemann started his career as a 110 m hurdler and was junior world champion in this discipline in 1994. After his surprising decathlon silver medal at the 1996 Summer Olympics with his personal best of 8706 points he became one of Germany's most popular sportsmen. He also was named German Sportsman of the Year. At the World Championships of the following year Busemann came third.

After these successes Busemann confronted severe injuries from which he only recovered partly. He made a comeback at the 2000 Olympics where he finished in seventh place. In 2003, at the age of just 28, he retired because of his deteriorating physical condition. His personal best of 8706 points ranks him fifth among German decathletes, behind Leo Neugebauer, Jürgen Hingsen, Uwe Freimuth and Siegfried Wentz.

== Achievements ==
Year	Competition	Venue	Position	Event	Notes
Representing Germany
1994	World Junior Championships	Lisbon, Portugal	1st	110 m hurdles	13.47 w (wind: +2.1 m/s)
1994	World Junior Championships	Lisbon, Portugal	6th	4 × 100 m relay	40.45
1996	Hypo-Meeting	Götzis, Austria	5th	Decathlon	8238 pts
1996	Olympic Games	Atlanta, United States	2nd	Decathlon	8706 pts
1997	European U23 Championships	Turku, Finland	1st	110 m hurdles	13.54 w (wind: +2.2 m/s)
1997	World Championships	Athens, Greece	3rd	Decathlon	8652 pts
1999	World Championships	Seville, Spain	—	Decathlon	DNF
2000	Hypo-Meeting	Götzis, Austria	6th	Decathlon	8531 pts
2000	Olympic Games	Sydney, Australia	7th	Decathlon	8351 pts

Awards
Preceded by Michael Schumacher	German Sportsman of the Year; 1996	Succeeded by Jan Ullrich
