= Stanislav Sajdok =

Czech sprint hurdler

Personal information
- Nationality: Czech Republic
- Born: 22 July 1983 (age 42) Bratislava, Czechoslovakia
- Height: 1.90 m (6 ft 3 in)
- Weight: 77 kg (170 lb)

Sport
- Sport: Athletics
- Event: 110 metres hurdles
- Club: TJ TŽ Třinec
- Coached by: Dalibor Kupka

Achievements and titles
- Personal best: 110 m hurdles: 13.53 s (2008)

Stanislav Sajdok (born 22 July 1983 in Bratislava, Czechoslovakia) is a Czech sprint hurdler. He set a personal best time of 13.53 seconds at the 2008 Ostrava Golden Spike in Ostrava, earning him a spot on the Czech track and field team for the Olympics.

Sajdok represented the Czech Republic at the 2008 Summer Olympics in Beijing, where he competed for the men's 110 m hurdles, an event which was later dominated by Cuban athlete and world-record holder Dayron Robles. He ran in the fourth heat against seven other athletes, including United States' David Payne and France's Ladji Doucouré, both of whom were heavy favorites in this event. He finished the race in sixth place by three hundredths of a second (0.03) behind Belarus' Maksim Lynsha, with a time of 13.89 seconds. Sajdok, however, failed to advance into the semi-finals, as he placed thirty-fourth overall, and was ranked below four mandatory slots for the next round.
