= Staņislavs Olijars =

Latvian hurdler (born 1979)

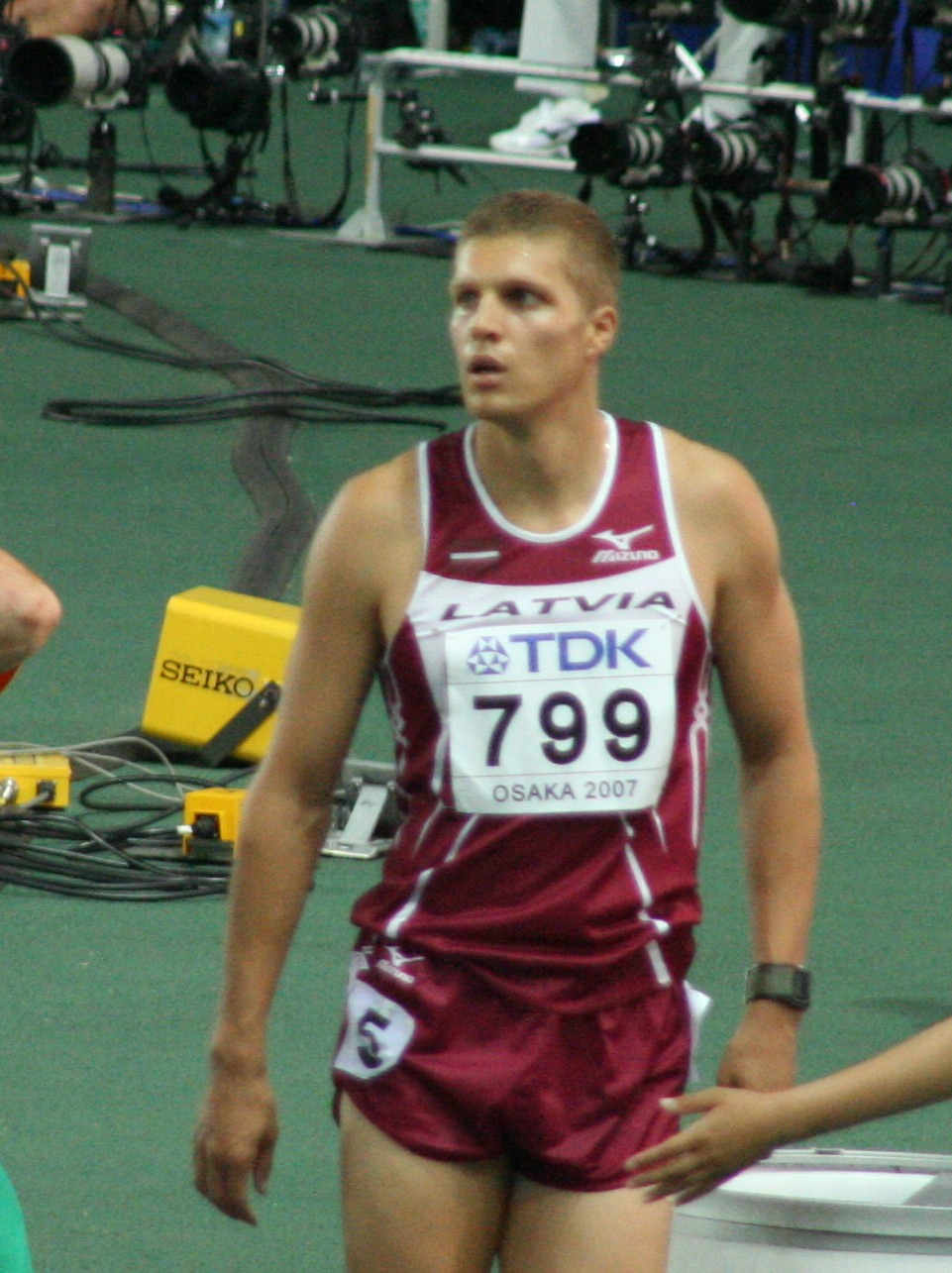
- Olijars at the 2007 World Championships in Athletics

Medal record

Men's athletics

Representing Latvia

World Indoor Championships
Bronze medal – third place	2008 Valencia	60 m hurdles

European Championships
Gold medal – first place	2006 Gothenburg	110 m hurdles
Silver medal – second place	2002 Munich	110 m hurdles

Staņislavs Olijars (Russian: Станислав Олияр, romanized: Stanislav Oliyar, born 22 March 1979) is a retired Latvian athlete mainly competing in the 110 metres hurdles. He is the 2000 European indoor champion, and in 2002 he won European indoor and outdoor medals. His best Olympic performance was in 2004, finishing 5th. In 2006 he became European champion in the event. In 2013 he retired.

== Personal bests ==
- 100 metres - 10.42 (2002)
- 200 metres - 20.91 (2003)
- 110 metres hurdles - 13.08 (2003)

== Competition record ==
Year	Competition	Venue	Position	Event	Notes
Representing Latvia
1996	World Junior Championships	Sydney, Australia	21st (h)	110 m hurdles	14.76 (wind: -1.5 m/s)
1996	World Junior Championships	Sydney, Australia	23rd (q)	Long jump	7.19 m (wind: +1.3 m/s)
1997	European Junior Championships	Ljubljana, Slovenia	2nd	110 m hurdles	13.74
1997	World Championships	Athens, Greece	21st (qf)	110 m hurdles	13.62
1998	European Indoor Championships	Valencia, Spain	14th (sf)	60 m hurdles	7.74
1998	World Junior Championships	Annecy, France	1st	110 m hurdles	13.51 (wind: -0.2 m/s)
1998	European Championships	Budapest, Hungary	16th (sf)	110 m hurdles	DQ
1999	European U23 Championships	Gothenburg, Sweden	2nd	110 m hurdles	13.55 (wind: +0.4 m/s)
1999	World Championships	Seville, Spain	14th (sf)	110 m hurdles	13.70
2000	European Indoor Championships	Ghent, Belgium	1st	60 m hurdles	7.50
2000	Olympic Games	Sydney, Australia	11th (sf)	110 m hurdles	13.50
2001	World Indoor Championships	Lisbon, Portugal	8th	60 m hurdles	12.77
2002	European Indoor Championships	Vienna, Austria	3rd	60 m hurdles	7.51
2002	European Championships	Munich, Germany	2nd	110 m hurdles	13.22
2003	World Indoor Championships	Birmingham, United Kingdom	6th	60 m hurdles	7.62
2003	World Athletics Final	Monte Carlo, Monaco	3rd	110 m hurdles	13.25
2003	World Championships	Paris, France	–	110 m hurdles	DNF
2004	World Indoor Championships	Budapest, Hungary	4th	60 m hurdles	7.49
2004	Olympic Games	Athens, Greece	5th	110 m hurdles	13.21
2004	World Athletics Final	Monte Carlo, Monaco	3rd	110 m hurdles	13.40
2005	European Indoor Championships	Madrid, Spain	6th	60 m hurdles	DQ
2005	World Championships	Helsinki, Finland	11th (sf)	110 m hurdles	13.53
2006	World Indoor Championships	Moscow, Russia	5th	60 m hurdles	7.52
2006	European Championships	Gothenburg, Sweden	1st	110 m hurdles	13.24
2007	European Indoor Championships	Birmingham, United Kingdom	10th (sf)	60 m hurdles	7.76
2007	World Championships	Osaka, Japan	22nd (sf)	110 m hurdles	13.78
2008	World Indoor Championships	Valencia, Spain	3rd	60 m hurdles	7.60
2009	World Championships	Berlin, Germany	17th (sf)	110 m hurdles	13.50
2010	European Athletics Championships	Barcelona, Spain	–	110 m hurdles	DQ
