= Xing Yan'an =

Chinese track and field athlete

Xing Yan'an (Chinese: 邢衍安; pinyin: Xíng Yǎn'ān; born 17 June 1983 in Zibo, Shandong) is a Chinese track and field athlete who has competed in sprinting and hurdling.

He represented his country in the 4×100 metres relay event at the 2008 Summer Olympics.

He set a new personal best in the 100 m in May 2009, finishing third at the Chinese national championships with a time of 10.38 seconds.

He won the relay bronze medal for Beijing at the 11th Chinese National Games in 2009 along with Zhang Peimeng.
