= Sébastien Denis =

French hurdler (born 1971)

Sébastien Denis (born 4 May 1971 in Paris) is a French hurdler.

He competed at the 2004 World Indoor Championships and the 2005 European Indoor Championships without reaching the final round.

His personal best time was 13.57 seconds, achieved in July 2003 in Narbonne.

In 2005, Denis tested positive for ephedrine. He received not a suspension, but a public warning.

== Bibliography ==
- Sébastien Denis at World Athletics
