= Damien Greaves =

British hurdler (born 1977)

Personal information
- Nationality: British (English)
- Born: 19 September 1977 (age 49) Forest Gate, Greater London, England
- Height: 181 cm (5 ft 11 in)
- Weight: 89 kg (196 lb)

Sport
- Sport: Athletics
- Event: Hurdles
- Club: Newham and Essex Beagles

Damien David Greaves (born 19 September 1977) is male former sprints and hurdling track and field athlete who represented Great Britain at the 2000 Summer Olympics in Sydney, Australia.

== Biography ==
Greaves was a finalist in the European and World Championships as a junior, and progressed smoothly into senior ranks in 1997, running a best of 13.82 and becoming the British 110 metres hurdles champion after winning the British AAA Championships title at the 1997 AAA Championships.

He was consistently sub-14 in 1998 (best 13.85/13.84w) and represented England in the 110 metres hurdles event, at the 1998 Commonwealth Games in Kuala Lumpur, Malaysia.

In 1999 (13.86) when he made his second European Under-23 final after placing 2nd at the AAAs. In 2000 he had an excellent indoor season running four personal bests for 60m hurdles to 7.68 for 5th in his semi-final at the European Indoors. Outdoors he improved his best for 110mh to 13.75, 13.66w and 13.62. He was 3rd at the AAAs, but although he qualified for the second round he was unable to better 14 seconds at the Summer Olympics.

After bobsledding during the winter (17th place in World 2-man Championships), Greaves won the 2001 Scottish title in 13.70 and had a season's best 13.68 for 2nd at the AAAs. He was disqualified for two false starts in his heat at the 2001 World Championships in Athletics. In 2002, he was 2nd in the AAA indoor 60m hurdles in 7.75 and went out in his heat at the European Indoors. He ran a personal best of 13.54 for 3rd at the AAAs, but fell at the first hurdle in the 2002 Commonwealth Games final and his 13.90 heat time at the European Championships was not enough to advance.

He showed top form again at the 2003 AAA Championships to regain the title in 13.66 and had bests of 13.68 and 13.50w in 2004. Having switched coaches from Lloyd Cowan and Colin Jackson to Mike McFarlane and lost weight, he ran a season's best of 7.68 in his heat but was slower at 7.75 for fifth in his 60mh semi-final at his fourth European Indoors in 2005. He won the 110mh at Loughborough in 13.59 but had to drop out of the European Cup team due to a trapped nerve in his back. He was disqualified for a false start in his heat at the AAAs.

Greaves narrowly missed the final when he was 5th in 13.71 in his heat at his third Commonwealth Games in 2006.
