= Thomas Blaschek =

German hurdler

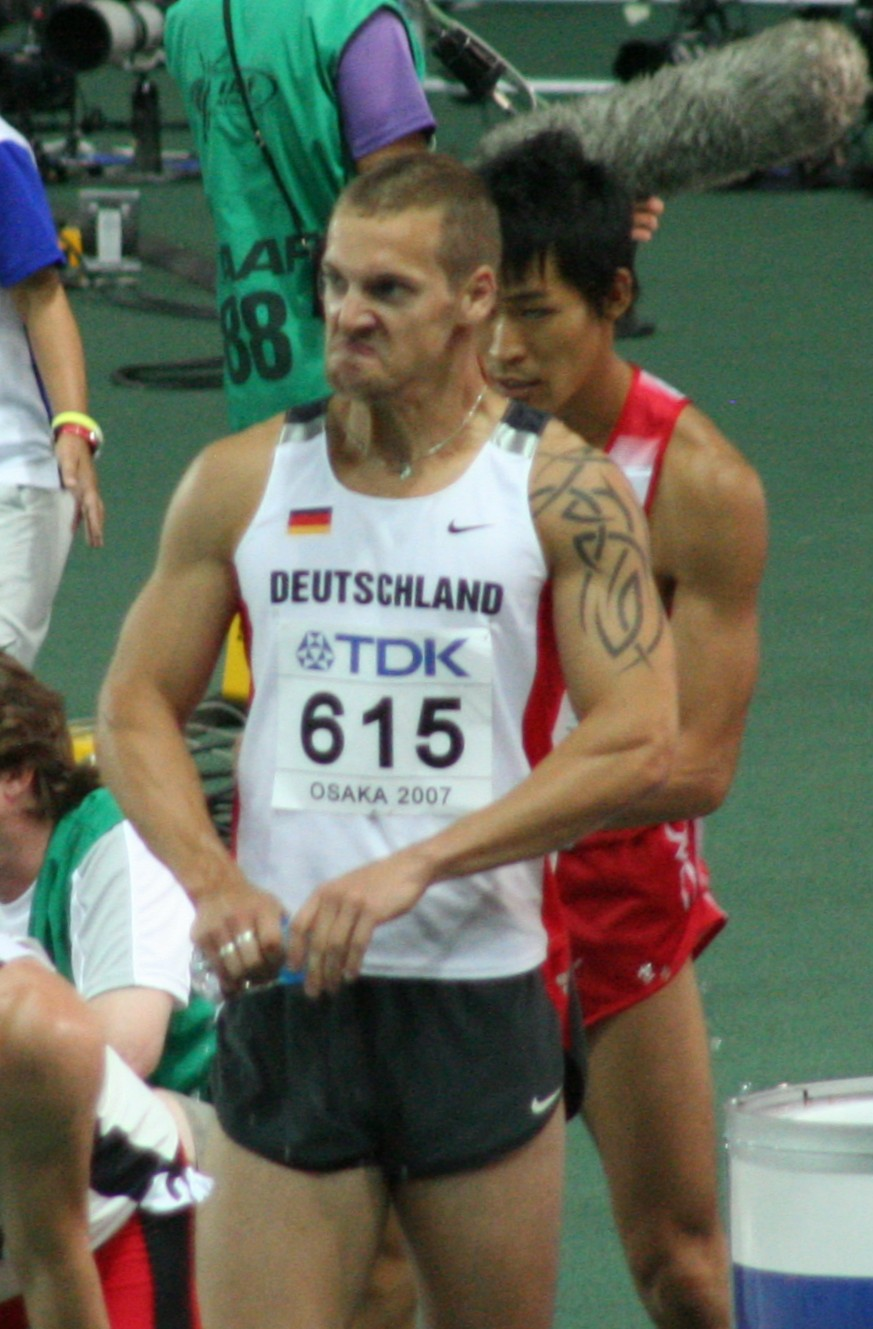
Blaschek at the 2007 World Championships in Athletics

Thomas Blaschek (born 5 April 1981 in Gera, East Germany) is a German hurdler. His personal best time is 13.31 seconds, achieved in July 2005 in Cuxhaven. This ranks him fifth among German 110 m hurdlers, behind Florian Schwarthoff, Mike Fenner, Eric Kaiser and Falk Balzer.

Blascheck was successful at junior level before his senior career, having won the bronze medal at the 1999 European Athletics Junior Championships and the silver medal at the 2000 World Junior Championships in Athletics. His senior breakthrough occurred in 2005, when he was the German champion indoors and outdoors and took a silver medal at the 2005 European Cup. Later that year he reached the semi-finals at the 2005 World Athletics Championships. He won the silver medal in the 110 metres hurdles at the 2006 European Athletics Championships in Gothenburg. He also competed internationally over 60 metres hurdles and reached the event final at both the 2005 European Athletics Indoor Championships and the 2006 IAAF World Indoor Championships.

Blaschek made his second outdoor global appearance at the 2007 World Championships in Athletics in Osaka and he again reached the 110 m hurdles semi-finals. The following year he was the bronze medallist at the European Athletics Indoor Cup and was fifth place over 60 m hurdles at the 2008 IAAF World Indoor Championships. He lost his place as the top German hurdler and was third at the 2009 German Athletics Championships.

He announced his retirement from athletics in September 2010, citing waning motivation and the long-lasting effects of calf muscle tears in each leg as the main reasons for his decision. He did not give up on sport entirely, however, and turned his eyes towards a career in bobsleighing instead, noting that he enjoyed the team aspect which was missing from his athletics career.

== Achievements ==
Year	Competition	Venue	Position	Event	Notes
Representing Germany
2000	World Junior Championships	Santiago, Chile	2nd	100 m hurdles	13.80 (wind: -0.1 m/s)
2001	European U23 Championships	Amsterdam, Netherlands	12th (h)	110 m hurdles	14.17 (wind: 1.2 m/s)
2003	European U23 Championships	Bydgoszcz, Poland	10th (sf)	110 m hurdles	13.77 (wind: 1.9 m/s)
2005	European Indoor Championships	Ghent, Belgium	5th	60 m hurdles	7.68
2006	World Indoor Championships	Moscow, Russia	6th	60 m hurdles	7.57
2006	European Championships	Gothenburg, Sweden	2nd	100 m hurdles	13.46
