= Dominique Arnold =

American hurdler (born 1973)

Personal information
- Born: September 14, 1973 (age 52) Compton, California, U.S.
Medal record
Men's Athletics
Representing United States
World Indoor Championships
Bronze medal – third place	2006 Moscow	60 m hurdles

Dominique Arnold (born September 14, 1973, in Compton, California) is an American hurdling athlete. He is tied for being the seventh fastest all-time 110 m hurdler, with a time of 12.90 s (+1.1 m/s), which was the American record from 2006 till 2010. Arnold set that mark in Lausanne, where he beat the current world record but lost to Liu Xiang. His performance is still the fastest losing time ever ran for the event.

Competing for the Washington State Cougars track and field team, Arnold won the 1996 NCAA championships in the 110 m hurdles.

In competition, Arnold finished fourth at the 2005 World Championships in Athletics and took bronze in the 60 m hurdles at the 2006 World Indoor Championships in Athletics. He also took bronze at the 2001 IAAF Grand Prix Final and silver at the 2005 World Athletics Final.

== Track records ==
As of 11 September 2024, Arnold holds the following track records for 110 metres hurdles.

Location	Time	Windspeed m/s	Date
Flagstaff, AZ	13.36	+ 1.5	19/07/1999
Heusden-Zolder	13.26	+ 1.4	14/07/2001
Königs Wusterhausen	13.14	+ 2.0	28/08/2001
Rethymno	13.01	+ 2.2	21/07/2006
Växjö	13.30	– 0.2	10/08/1999
