= Matti Niemi (hurdler) =

Finnish hurdler

Matti Niemi (born 15 November 1976) is a retired Finnish athlete who specialized in the 110 metres hurdles.

He was born in Padasjoki. He competed at the World Championships in 1999, 2003 and 2005, as well as the 2002 European Championships and the 2003 World Indoor Championships without reaching the final round.

He became Finnish champion in 1999 and 2003, rivalling Jarno Jokihaara and Marko Ritola. He also became indoor champion in 2003.

His personal best time was 13.57 seconds, achieved in July 2003 in Lahti.
