= Igor Peremota =

Russian hurdler (born 1981)

Igor Viktorovich Peremota (Russian: Игорь Викторович Перемота; born January 14, 1981, in Kopeysk, Chelyabinsk) is a Russian hurdler.

He won a silver medal at the 2003 Summer Universiade, and competed in the 2004 Olympic Games where he was knocked out in the quarter final. He also reached the semi-finals at the 2005 World Athletics Championships, and finished fourth at the 2006 European Athletics Championships and sixth at the 2006 IAAF World Cup.

His personal best time is 13.37 seconds, achieved in June 2006 in Tula.
