= Maurice Wignall =

Jamaican athletics competitor

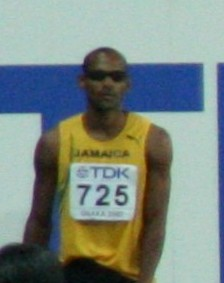
- Maurice Wignall in 2007

Personal information
- Born: 17 April 1976 (age 50) Saint Andrew Parish, Jamaica

Sport
- Sport: Track and field
Medal record
Men's Athletics
Representing Jamaica
World Indoor Championships
Bronze medal – third place	2004 Budapest	60 m hurdles
Commonwealth Games
Gold medal – first place	2006 Melbourne	110 m hurdles
Bronze medal – third place	2002 Manchester	110 m hurdles
CARIFTA Games Junior (U20)
Gold medal – first place	1995 George Town	110m hurdles
Gold medal – first place	1995 George Town	Long Jump
Gold medal – first place	1994 Bridgetown	Long Jump
Gold medal – first place	1994 Bridgetown	4x100m relay
Silver medal – second place	1994 Bridgetown	110m hurdles
Silver medal – second place	1993 Fort-de-France	Long Jump
Bronze medal – third place	1995 George Town	Triple Jump
Bronze medal – third place	1993 Fort-de-France	110m hurdles

Maurice Andre Wignall (born 17 April 1976) is a Jamaican hurdler.

His first appearance in a major international championship was at the 1997 World Championships, where he competed in the long jump competition. He jumped 8.09, which still stands as his personal best. Competing for the George Mason Patriots track and field team, Wignall won the 1999 long jump at the NCAA Division I Indoor Track and Field Championships with a jump of 7.96 m.

Wignall's success in hurdling came relatively late. He took his first medal, a bronze medal, at the 2002 Commonwealth Games. At the 2004 World Indoor Championships, Wignall won the bronze medal in 60 m hurdles which is the distance used indoor. Later that year he competed in the Olympic 110 metres Hurdles where he placed fourth in the final, missing the bronze medal by one hundredth of a second. In the semi-final he set a new national record with a time of 13.17.

At the end of the 2004 season Wignall won the silver medal in the 2nd IAAF World Athletics Final. He also competed in Helsinki 2005, but finished seventh in the final.

In March 2006 he won the gold medal at the Commonwealth Games, with a time of 13.26, comfortably ahead of the rest of the field.
