= Gregory Sedoc =

Dutch hurdler

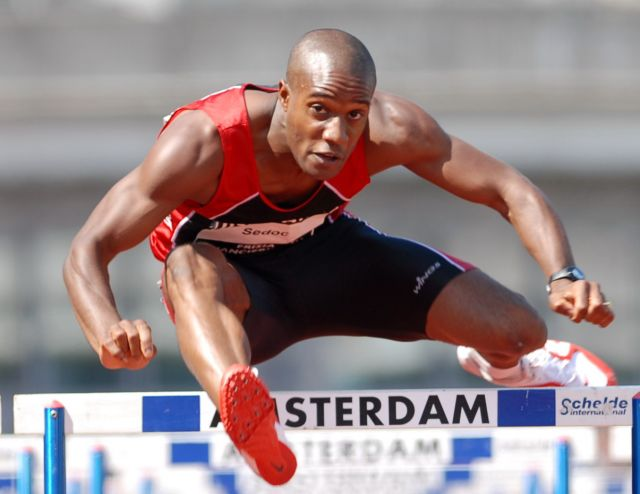
- Gregory Sedoc in 2007

Personal information
- Born: 16 October 1981 (age 44) Amsterdam, Netherlands
- Height: 1.79 m (5 ft 10 in)
- Weight: 74 kg (163 lb)

Achievements and titles
- Personal best(s): 100 m - 10.58 (2008); 110 m hurdles - 13.37 (2007) long jump – 7.82 (2005)
Medal record
Representing Netherlands
Men's athletics
European Indoor Championships
Gold medal – first place	2007 Birmingham	60 m hurdles
Silver medal – second place	2009 Torino	60 m hurdles
- Updated on 2 April 2009

Gregory Sedoc (born 16 October 1981) is a Dutch retired hurdler.

== Career ==
He reached his first international final at the 2007 European Indoor Championships in 60 metres hurdles, and won the event, equalling his personal best time of 7.63 seconds which was established in the previous rounds and beating fellow-countryman Marcel van der Westen by 0.01 second. Commenting on the win, Sedoc stated that "this is so ridiculous. Unbelievable. I never thought I would be able to become European champion... Getting a one-two in the final has never happened to the Netherlands before and it's fantastic." Sedoc followed this up with a silver medal at the 2009 European Indoor Championships.

He had previously competed at the European Championships in 2002 and 2006, the World Championships in 2003 and 2005 and the 2004 Olympics, as well as numerous European Indoor (2002, 2005) and World Indoor Championships (2003, 2004, 2006), without ever reaching the final.

Since 2007, he has competed at the 2008 and 2012 Summer Olympics, reaching the semifinals both times, as well as the 2009 and 2011 World Championships, and the 2012 and 2014 European Championships, reaching the final in 2012.

His personal best time over 110 m hurdles is 13.37 seconds, achieved in May 2007 in Hengelo.

== Personal life ==
Sedoc grew up in a family of athletes. His father Roy Sedoc is a Dutch former athlete who became multiple Dutch champion in the long jump and triple jump disciplines. His brothers Jermaine, Randy are also athletes, and another brother, Valery Sedoc, is a former professional footballer for FC Groningen.

== Dutch Championships ==
Event

Event	Year
110 m hurdles	2002, 2003, 2005, 2007, 2009, 2015
long jump	2006

Indoor

Event	Year
60 m hurdles	2003, 2004, 2006, 2007, 2009, 2010, 2015

Awards
Preceded by Guillaume Elmont	Amsterdam Sportsman of the Year; 2006 and 2007	Succeeded by Marcel van der Westen
