= Ethiopia at the 2003 All-Africa Games =

- IOC code: ETH
- NOC: Ethiopian Olympic Committee

in Abuja 5 October 2003 – 17 October 2003
- Medals Ranked 8th: Gold 5 Silver 8 Bronze 7 Total 20

All-Africa Games appearances
- 1965; 1973; 1978; 1987; 1991; 1995; 1999; 2003; 2007; 2011; 2015; 2019; 2023

Ethiopia competed in the 2003 All-Africa Games held at the National Stadium in the city of Abuja, Nigeria. The team wielded a very strong athletic contingent, which brought back a total of five gold, six silver and four bronze medals. Amongst the gold medal winners were future multiple Olympic gold medal winners Kenenisa Bekele and Meseret Defar. In boxing, the team brought back a silver and two bronze medals. At the end of the event, the team had won a total of twenty medals, the largest number that it had won in the history of the Games, and came eighth overall in the medal table.

== Competitors ==
Ethiopia has been a consistent attendee at the All-Africa Games. In 2003, the country entered sixty five events, including thirty one for men and thirty four for women. The athletics contingent was particularly strong. Among the competitors was Meseret Defar, winner of two Olympic gold medals and twice world record holder, and Kenenisa Bekele, who won three Olympic medals and the first to win both the 5000 metre and 10,000 metre titles at the World Championships. The country also entered the women’s football tournament, which was the first time that the sport had been played at the Games. Much was hoped for, especially given the unprecedented haul of fourteen medals in 1999. The team did not disappoint and achieved an even higher tally.

=== Medal table ===
Sport	Gold	Silver	Bronze	Total
Athletics	5	6	4	15
Boxing	0	1	2	3
Taekwondo	0	1	0	1
Total	5	8	7	20

== Medal summary ==
Ethiopia won twenty medals, consisting of five gold, eight silver and seven bronze, and was ranked eighth in the final medal table. This was the largest haul of medals that the country had achieved during the history of the Games, exceeding the previous record, achieved in 1999, by six.

== List of Medalists ==
=== Gold Medal ===
Medal	Name	Sport	Event	Date	Ref
Gold	Meseret Defar	Athletics	Women's 5000 metres	11 October 2003	
Gold	Sileshi Sihine	Athletics	Men's 10,000 metres	12 October 2003	
Gold	Kutre Dulecha	Athletics	Women's 1500 metres	13 October 2003	
Gold	Ejegayehu Dibaba	Athletics	Women's 10,000 metres	14 October 2003	
Gold	Kenenisa Bekele	Athletics	Men's 5000 metres	15 October 2003	

=== Silver Medal ===
Medal	Name	Sport	Event	Date	Ref
Silver	Endalkachew Kebede	Boxing	Light Flyweight 48 kg	12 October 2003	
Silver	Gebreegziabher Gebremariam	Athletics	Men's 10,000 metres	12 October 2003	
Silver	Werknesh Kidane	Athletics	Women's 10,000 metres	14 October 2003	
Silver	Amsale Yakob	Athletics	Women's 20 kilometres walk	14 October 2003	
Silver	Hailu Mekonnen	Athletics	Men's 5000 metres	15 October 2003	
Silver	Gashaw Melese	Athletics	Men's marathon	15 October 2003	
Silver	Tadelech Birra	Athletics	Women's marathon	15 October 2003	
Silver	Yoseph Adamsegeo	Taekwondo	Men's Under 54 kg	16 October 2003	

=== Bronze Medal ===
Medal	Name	Sport	Event	Date	Ref
Bronze	Daniel Tade	Boxing	Featherweight 57 kg	11 October 2003	
Bronze	Esayas Getaneh	Boxing	Lightweight 60kg	11 October 2003	
Bronze	Dejene Berhanu	Athletics	Men's 10,000 metres	12 October 2003	
Bronze	Tewodros Shiferaw	Athletics	Men's 3000 metres steeplechase	13 October 2003	
Bronze	Leila Aman	Athletics	Women's marathon	15 October 2003	
Bronze	Gudisa Shentema	Athletics	Men's marathon	16 October 2003	
