= Ethiopia at the 2004 Summer Olympics =

- IOC code: ETH
- NOC: Ethiopian Olympic Committee

in Athens
- Competitors: 26 in 2 sports
- Flag bearer: Abel Aferalign
- Medals Ranked 28th: Gold 2 Silver 3 Bronze 2 Total 7

Summer Olympics appearances (overview)
- 1956; 1960; 1964; 1968; 1972; 1976; 1980; 1984–1988; 1992; 1996; 2000; 2004; 2008; 2012; 2016; 2020; 2024

Ethiopia was represented at the 2004 Summer Olympics in Athens, Greece by the Ethiopian Olympic Committee.

In total, 26 athletes including 14 men and 12 women represented Ethiopia in two different sports including athletics and boxing.

Ethiopia won a total seven medals at the games including two gold, three silver and two bronze. Kenenisa Bekele was the country's most successful athlete at the games after winning gold in the men's 10,000 m and silver in the men's 5,000 m.

== Competitors ==
In total, 26 athletes represented Ethiopia at the 2004 Summer Olympics in Athens, Greece across two different sports.

Sport	Men	Women	Total
Athletics	12	12	24
Boxing	2	0	2
Total	14	12	26

== Medalists ==
Ethiopia won a total of seven medals at the games including two gold, three silver and two bronze. Kenenisa Bekele was the country's most successful athlete at the games after winning gold in the men's 10,000 m and silver in the men's 5,000 m.

Medal	Name	Sport	Event	Date
Gold	Kenenisa Bekele	Athletics	Men's 10,000 m	August 20
Gold	Meseret Defar	Athletics	Women's 5,000 m	August 23
Silver	Kenenisa Bekele	Athletics	Men's 5,000 m	August 28
Silver	Sileshi Sihine	Athletics	Men's 10,000 m	August 20
Silver	Ejegayehu Dibaba	Athletics	Women's 10,000 m	August 27
Bronze	Tirunesh Dibaba	Athletics	Women's 5,000 m	August 23
Bronze	Derartu Tulu	Athletics	Women's 10,000 m	August 27

== Athletics ==
In total, 24 Ethiopian athletes participated in the athletics events – Berhanu Alemu, Elfenesh Alemu, Kenenisa Bekele, Dejene Berhanu, Meseret Defar, Ejegayehu Dibaba, Tirunesh Dibaba, Kutre Dulecha, Sentayehu Ejigu, Gebregziabher Gebremariam, Haile Gebrselassie, Asha Gigi, Werknesh Kidane, Meskerem Legesse, Hailu Negussie, Tewodros Shiferaw, Sileshi Sihine, Mestawat Tadesse, Workenesh Tola, Ambesse Tolosa, Derartu Tulu, Luleseged Wale, Mulugeta Wendimu and Tereje Wodajo.

Most of the athletics events took place at the Athens Olympic Stadium in Marousi, Athens from 18 to 29 August 2004. The men's and women's marathons took place at the Panathenaic Stadium in Pangrati, Athens.

Men

Athlete	Event	Heat		Semifinal		Final	
Athlete	Event	Result	Rank	Result	Rank	Result	Rank
Berhanu Alemu	800 m	1:46.26	2 Q	1:47.40	6	Did not advance	
Kenenisa Bekele	5,000 m	13:21.16	1 Q	—		13:14.59	2nd place, silver medalist(s)
Kenenisa Bekele	10,000 m	—				27:05.10 OR	1st place, gold medalist(s)
Dejene Berhanu	5,000 m	13:19.42	3 Q	—		13:16.92	5
Gebregziabher Gebremariam	5,000 m	13:21.20	2 Q	—		13:15.35	4
Haile Gebrselassie	10,000 m	—				27:27.70	5
Hailu Negussie	Marathon	—				DNF	
Tewodros Shiferaw	3,000 m steeplechase	8:33.15	10	—		Did not advance	
Sileshi Sihine	10,000 m	—				27:09.39	2nd place, silver medalist(s)
Ambesse Tolosa	Marathon	—				2:15:39	15
Luleseged Wale	3,000 m steeplechase	8:50.73	12	—		Did not advance	
Mulugeta Wendimu	1,500 m	3:39.96	5 Q	3:41.14	4 Q	3:38.33	10
Tereje Wodajo	Marathon	—				2:21:53	46

Women

Athlete	Event	Heat		Semifinal		Final	
Athlete	Event	Result	Rank	Result	Rank	Result	Rank
Elfenesh Alemu	Marathon	—				2:28:15	4
Meseret Defar	5,000 m	14:52.39	1 Q	—		14:45.65	1st place, gold medalist(s)
Ejegayehu Dibaba	10,000 m	—				30:24.98	2nd place, silver medalist(s)
Tirunesh Dibaba	5,000 m	15:00.66	1 Q	—		14:51.83	3rd place, bronze medalist(s)
Kutre Dulecha	1,500 m	4:06.95	5 Q	4:07.63	8	Did not advance	
Sentayehu Ejigu	5,000 m	15:01.31	2 Q	—		15:09.55	10
Asha Gigi	Marathon	—				DNF	
Werknesh Kidane	10,000 m	—				30:28.30	4
Meskerem Legesse	1,500 m	4:18.03	12	Did not advance			
Mestawat Tadesse	1,500 m	4:11.78	12	Did not advance			
Workenesh Tola	Marathon	—				DNF	
Derartu Tulu	10,000 m	—				30:26.42	3rd place, bronze medalist(s)

== Boxing ==
In total, two Ethiopian athletes participated in the boxing events – Abel Aferalign in the bantamweight category and Endalkachew Kebede in the light flyweight category.

The boxing events took place at the Peristeri Olympic Boxing Hall in Peristeri, Athens from 14 to 29 August 2004.

Athlete	Event	Round of 32	Round of 16	Quarterfinals	Semifinals	Final	
Athlete	Event	Opposition Result	Opposition Result	Opposition Result	Opposition Result	Opposition Result	Rank
Endalkachew Kebede	Light flyweight	Igarashi (JPN); W 26–21	Zou Sm (CHN); L 8–31	Did not advance			
Abel Aferalign	Bantamweight	Dalakliev (BUL); L RSC	Did not advance				
