= Madagascar at the 2003 All-Africa Games =

- IOC code: MAD
- NOC: Comité Olympique Malgache

in Abuja 5 October 2003 – 17 October 2003
- Medals: Gold 3 Silver 0 Bronze 3 Total 6

All-Africa Games appearances
- 1965; 1973; 1978; 1987; 1991; 1995; 1999; 2003; 2007; 2011; 2015; 2019; 2023

Youth appearances
- 2010; 2014

Madagascar competed in the 2003 All-Africa Games held at the National Stadium in the city of Abuja, Nigeria.

== Medal summary ==
Madagascar won six medals, three gold and three bronze.

=== Medal table ===
Sport	Gold	Silver	Bronze	Total
Athletics	2	0	0	2
Judo	0	0	1	1
Karate	1	0	1	2
Wrestling	0	0	1	1
Total	3	0	3	6

== List of Medalists ==
=== Gold Medal ===
Medal	Name	Sport	Event	Date	Ref
Gold	Joseph-Berlioz Randriamihaja	Athletics	Men's 110 m hurdles		
Gold	Clarisse Rasoarizay	Athletics	Women's marathon		
Gold	Toky Razafindrakoto	Karate	Women's Individual Kata		

=== Bronze Medal ===
Medal	Name	Sport	Event	Date	Ref
Bronze	Naina Ravaoarisoa	Judo	Women's 52 kg		
Bronze	Rudy Razafarisom	Karate	Men's Individual Kata		
Bronze	Josiane Soloniaina	Wrestling	Women's 59 kg		
