= 2012 African Championships in Athletics – Men's 110 metres hurdles =

The men's 110 metres hurdles at the 2012 African Championships in Athletics was held at the Stade Charles de Gaulle on 29 and 30 June.

== Medalists ==
Gold	Lehann Fourie; South Africa
Silver	Selim Nurudeen; Nigeria
Bronze	Lyes Mokdel; Algeria

== Records ==
Standing records prior to the 2012 African Championships in Athletics
World record	Dayron Robles (CUB)	12.87	Ostrava, Czech Republic	12 June 2008
African record	Shaun Bownes (RSA)	13.26	Heusden-Zolder, Netherlands	14 July 2001
Championship record	Todd Matthews-Jouda (SUD)	13.70	Brazzaville, Republic of the Congo	15 July 2004
Broken records during the 2012 African Championships in Athletics
Championship record	Lehann Fourie (RSA)	13.55	Porto-Novo, Benin	29 June 2012

== Schedule ==
Date	Time	Round
29 June 2012	15:10	Round 1
30 June 2012	16:00	Final

== Results ==
=== Round 1 ===
First 3 in each heat (Q) and 2 best performers (q) advance to the Final.

Wind:
Heat 1: -0.8 m/s, Heat 2: -1.6 m/s

Rank	Heat	Lane	Name	Nationality	Time	Note
1	1	7	Lehann Fourie	South Africa	13.55	Q, CR
2	2	6	Lyes Mokdel	Algeria	13.70	Q
3	1	2	Selim Nurudeen	Nigeria	13.73	Q
4	2	3	Othmane Hadj Lazib	Algeria	13.85	Q
5	1	6	Keith Nkruman	Ghana	13.87	Q
6	2	7	Samuel Okun	Nigeria	14.01	Q
7	2	5	Jangy Addy	Liberia	14.05	q
8	1	4	Moussa Dembélé	Senegal	14.14	q
9	1	3	Mohamed Koné	Mali	14.24	
10	2	4	Ruan de Vries	South Africa	14.30	
11	2	2	Amadou Gueye	Senegal	14.50	
12	2	8	Menseh Elliot	Gambia	14.70	NR
13	1	8	Thierry Essamba	Cameroon	15.15	
14	2	1	Florent Lomba Bilisi	Democratic Republic of the Congo	15.44	
	1	5	Abduhamid Hamad	Libya	DNS	
	1	1	Junior Mkhatini	South Africa	DNS	

=== Final ===
Wind: -1.1 m/s

Rank	Lane	Name	Nationality	Time	Note
1st place, gold medalist(s)	4	Lehann Fourie	South Africa	13.60	
2nd place, silver medalist(s)	5	Selim Nurudeen	Nigeria	13.68	
3rd place, bronze medalist(s)	3	Lyes Mokdel	Algeria	13.73	
4	8	Samuel Okun	Nigeria	13.94	
5	6	Othmane Hadj Lazib	Algeria	13.94	
6	7	Keith Nkruman	Ghana	13.96	
7	1	Moussa Dembélé	Senegal	14.32	
	2	Jangy Addy	Liberia	DNS	
