= Athletics at the 2011 All-Africa Games – Men's 110 metres hurdles =

The Men's 110 meters hurdles at the 2011 All-Africa Games took place on 12 September at the Estádio Nacional do Zimpeto.

== Medalists ==
| Gold | Othman Hadj Lazib (ALG) |
| Silver | Selim Nurudeen (NGR) |
| Bronze | Samuel Okon (NGR) |

== Records ==
Prior to the competition, the following records were as follows.

| World record | Dayron Robles (CUB) | 12.87 | Ostrava, Czech Republic | 12 June 2008 |
| World leading | David Oliver (USA) | 12.94 | Eugene, United States | 4 June 2011 |
| African record | Shaun Bownes (RSA) | 13.26 | Heusden, Netherlands | 14 July 2001 |

== Schedule ==
| Date | Time | Round |
|---|---|---|
| September 12, 2011 | 18:40 | Final |

== Results ==
=== Final ===
Wind : +2.0 m/s

| Rank | Name | Nationality | Time | Notes |
|---|---|---|---|---|
| 1st place, gold medalist(s) | Othman Hadj Lazib | Algeria | 13.48 | GR |
| 2nd place, silver medalist(s) | Selim Nurudeen | Nigeria | 13.61 | |
| 3rd place, bronze medalist(s) | Samuel Okon | Nigeria | 13.75 | |
| 4 | Martins Oghieriaki | Nigeria | 13.89 | |
| 5 | Moussa Dembélé | Senegal | 14.11 | |
| 6 | Mohamed Koné | Mali | 14.18 | |
| 7 | Amon Chepsongol | Kenya | 14.28 | |
| 8 | Florent Lomba Bilisi | Democratic Republic of the Congo | 14.94 | |
| 9 | Titos Januario Dlalice | Mozambique | 15.06 | |
