= 2010 African Championships in Athletics – Men's 110 metres hurdles =

The men's 110 metres hurdles at the 2010 African Championships in Athletics were held on July 30–31.

== Medalists ==
Gold	Silver	Bronze
Othmane Hadj Lazib; Algeria	Selim Nurudeen; Nigeria	Ruan de Vries; South Africa

== Results ==
=== Heats ===
Qualification: First 3 of each heat (Q) and the next 2 fastest (q) qualified for the final.

Rank	Heat	Name	Nationality	Time	Notes
1	2	Lehann Fourie	South Africa	13.73	Q
2	1	Othmane Hadj Lazib	Algeria	13.76	Q
3	1	Selim Nurudeen	Nigeria	13.76	Q
4	2	Samuel Okon	Nigeria	13.95	Q
5	1	Ruan de Vries	South Africa	14.12	Q
6	2	Lyes Mokddel	Algeria	14.19	Q
7	1	Ammon Chepsongol	Kenya	14.19	q, SB
8	1	Joseph-Berlioz Randriamihaja	Madagascar	14.28	q
9	2	Samuel Kipkoech Korir	Kenya	14.41	SB
10	1	Valery Komenan	Ivory Coast	14.73	
11	2	Zelalem Chimdessa	Ethiopia	15.12	
	1	Emmanuel Kimeu	Kenya	DQ	
	2	Thierry Serge Essamba	Cameroon	DNS	

=== Final ===
Wind: +1.80 m/s

Rank	Lane	Name	Nationality	Time	Notes
1st place, gold medalist(s)	5	Othmane Hadj Lazib	Algeria	13.77	
2nd place, silver medalist(s)	3	Selim Nurudeen	Nigeria	13.83	
3rd place, bronze medalist(s)	8	Ruan de Vries	South Africa	13.98	
4	4	Samuel Okon	Nigeria	14.00	
5	7	Lyes Mokddel	Algeria	14.11	
6	1	Joseph-Berlioz Randriamihaja	Madagascar	14.11	SB
7	2	Ammon Chepsongol	Kenya	14.20	SB
	2	Lehann Fourie	South Africa	DNF	
