= Athletics at the 2007 All-Africa Games – Men's 110 metres hurdles =

The men's 110 metres hurdles at the 2007 All-Africa Games were held on July 18–19.

== Medalists ==
Gold	Silver	Bronze
Selim Nurudeen; Nigeria	Berlioz Randriamihaja; Madagascar	Shaun Bownes; South Africa

== Results ==
=== Heats ===
Qualification: First 3 of each heat (Q) and the next 2 fastest (q) qualified for the final.

Wind:
Heat 1: +0.5 m/s, Heat 2: +1.5 m/s

Rank	Heat	Name	Nationality	Time	Notes
1	2	Selim Nurudeen	Nigeria	13.72	Q
2	1	Shaun Bownes	South Africa	13.74	Q
3	2	Berlioz Randriamihaja	Madagascar	13.80	Q
4	1	Samuel Okon	Nigeria	13.81	Q
5	1	Aymen Ben Ahmed	Tunisia	13.86	Q
6	1	Othmane Hadj Lazib	Algeria	14.08	q
7	2	Ruan de Vries	South Africa	14.09	Q
8	2	Idris Abdelrahman	Egypt	14.42	q
9	2	Christophe du Mée	Mauritius	14.59	
10	1	Camara Kerfala	Guinea	15.23	
11	2	Alpha Oumar Konate	Guinea	15.36	

=== Final ===
Wind: 0.0 m/s

Rank	Name	Nationality	Time	Notes
1st place, gold medalist(s)	Selim Nurudeen	Nigeria	13.59	GR
2nd place, silver medalist(s)	Berlioz Randriamihaja	Madagascar	13.72	
3rd place, bronze medalist(s)	Shaun Bownes	South Africa	13.81	
4	Aymen Ben Ahmed	Tunisia	13.81	
5	Samuel Okon	Nigeria	13.94	
6	Othmane Hadj Lazib	Algeria	14.04	
7	Ruan de Vries	South Africa	14.05	
8	Idris Abdelrahaman	Egypt	14.65	
