= 2006 African Championships in Athletics – Men's 110 metres hurdles =

The men's 110 metres hurdles event at the 2006 African Championships in Athletics was held at the Stade Germain Comarmond on August 11–12.

== Medalists ==
Gold	Silver	Bronze
Aymen Ben Ahmed; Tunisia	Joseph-Berlioz Randriamihaja; Madagascar	Ruan de Vries; South Africa

== Results ==
=== Heats ===
Wind: Heat 1: -2.2 m/s, Heat 2: -3.0 m/s

Rank	Heat	Name	Nationality	Time	Notes
1	1	Othmane Hadj Lazib	Algeria	14.14	Q
2	1	Joseph-Berlioz Randriamihaja	Madagascar	14.14	Q
3	1	Seleke Samake	Senegal	14.22	Q
4	2	Shaun Bownes	South Africa	14.26	Q
5	2	Aymen Ben Ahmed	Tunisia	14.28	Q
6	2	Salim Nurudeen	Nigeria	14.54	Q
7	1	Ruan de Vries	South Africa	14.56	q
8	2	Christophe Du Mee	Mauritius	14.95	q
9	1	Lensley Juhel	Mauritius	15.14	
10	2	Alberto Mondre	Mauritius	15.39	
11	2	Mohamed Diarra	Mali	15.46	

=== Final ===
Wind: -2.8 m/s

Rank	Lane	Name	Nationality	Time	Notes
1st place, gold medalist(s)	5	Aymen Ben Ahmed	Tunisia	13.77	
2nd place, silver medalist(s)	6	Joseph-Berlioz Randriamihaja	Madagascar	14.03	
3rd place, bronze medalist(s)	2	Ruan de Vries	South Africa	14.05	
4	4	Othmane Hadj Lazib	Algeria	14.11	
5	8	Salim Nurudeen	Nigeria	14.32	
6	7	Christophe Du Mee	Mauritius	14.54	
7	1	Seleke Samake	Senegal	14.55	
	3	Shaun Bownes	South Africa	DNF	
