= Ejigu =

Ejigu is a personal name of Ethiopian origin which may refer to:

- Sentayehu Ejigu (born 1985), Ethiopian long-distance runner and world medallist
- Deriba Merga Ejigu (born 1980), Ethiopian long-distance runner and 2009 winner of the Boston Marathon
