= Clarisse Rasoarizay =

Malagasy long-distance runner

Clarisse Rasoarizay (born September 27, 1971) is a female long-distance runner from Madagascar, who competed at the 2004 Summer Olympics in Athens, Greece. She won the women's marathon at the 2003 All-Africa Games in Abuja, Nigeria and the 1997 Jeux de la Francophonie.

== Personal bests ==
- 5000 metres - 16:20.30 minutes (1998) - national record.
- 10,000 metres - 33:00.44 minutes (2003) - national record.
- Marathon - 2:38:21 hours (2003) - national record.

== Achievements ==
| Year | Competition | Venue | Position | Event | Notes |
Representing Madagascar
| 1997 | Jeux de la Francophonie | Antananarivo, Madagascar | 1st | Marathon | 2:56:24 |
| 2001 | Jeux de la Francophonie | Ottawa-Hull, Canada | 2nd | Marathon | 2:46:29 |
| 2003 | All-Africa Games | Abuja, Nigeria | 1st | Marathon | 2:46:58 |
| 2004 | Olympic Games | Athens, Greece | 43rd | Marathon | 2:48:14 |
| 2005 | World Championships | Helsinki, Finland | 43rd | Marathon | 2:43:58 |
| 2005 | Jeux de la Francophonie | Niamey, Niger | 4th | Marathon | 2:52:00 |

== See also ==
- Madagascar at the 2003 All-Africa Games
