= 2016 African Championships in Athletics – Men's 110 metres hurdles =

The men's 110 metres hurdles event at the 2016 African Championships in Athletics was held on 24 and 25 June in Kings Park Stadium.

== Medalists ==
Gold	Silver	Bronze
Antonio Alkana; South Africa	Tyron Akins; Nigeria	Mohamed Koussi; Morocco

== Results ==
=== Heats ===
Qualification: First 3 of each heat (Q) and the next 2 fastest (q) qualified for the final.

Wind:
Heat 1: +1.8 m/s, Heat 2: +1.3 m/s

Rank	Heat	Name	Nationality	Time	Notes
1	2	Tyron Akins	Nigeria	13.62	Q
2	1	Antonio Alkana	South Africa	13.73	Q
3	1	Rami Gharsali	Tunisia	13.98	Q
4	2	Ruan de Vries	South Africa	14.15	Q
5	1	Mohamed Koussi	Morocco	14.21	Q
6	1	Tshepo Lefete	South Africa	14.21	q
7	2	Bano Traoré	Mali	14.27	Q
8	2	Fred Charles Pieterse	Namibia	14.41	q
9	2	Selby Mukucha	Zimbabwe	14.52	
10	2	William Mbevi Mutunga	Kenya	15.16	
11	1	Behailu Alemshet	Ethiopia	15.26	

=== Final ===
Wind: No information

Rank	Lane	Athlete	Nationality	Time	Notes
1st place, gold medalist(s)	5	Antonio Alkana	South Africa	13.43	CR
2nd place, silver medalist(s)	4	Tyron Akins	Nigeria	13.74	
3rd place, bronze medalist(s)	7	Mohamed Koussi	Morocco	13.94	
4	6	Rami Gharsali	Tunisia	13.99	
5	2	Bano Traoré	Mali	14.22	
6	1	Fred Charles Pieterse	Namibia	14.45	
7	3	Ruan de Vries	South Africa	14.52	
	8	Tshepo Lefete	South Africa	DNS	
