= Athmane Hadj Lazib =

Algerian hurdler (born 1983)

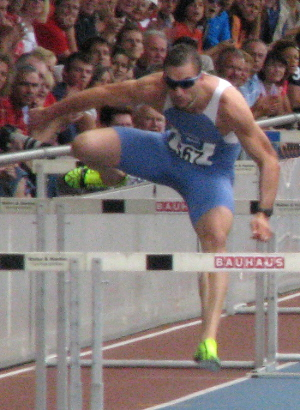
- Othmane Hadj Lazib at 2011 Mannheim DLV

Medal record

Men's athletics

Representing Algeria

All-Africa Games
Gold medal – first place	2011 Maputo	110 m hurdles

African Championships
Gold medal – first place	2010 Nairobi	110 m hurdles

Mediterranean Games
Bronze medal – third place	2013 Mersin	110 m hurdles

Athmane Hadj Lazib (born 10 May 1983 in Hadjout) is a hurdler from Algeria. In 2010 he competed at the 2010 African Championships in Nairobi and won the gold medal in the 110 metre hurdles with a time of 13.77.

He has personal bests of 13.46 seconds in the 110 metres hurdles (2011) and 7.72 in the 60 metres hurdles (2011). Both are current national records.

== Competition record ==
Year	Competition	Venue	Position	Event	Notes
Representing Algeria
2005	Islamic Solidarity Games	Mecca, Saudi Arabia	15th (h)	110 m hurdles	14.75
2006	African Championships	Bambous, Mauritius	4th	110m hurdles	14.11
2007	All-Africa Games	Algiers, Algeria	6th	110m hurdles	14.04
2007	Pan Arab Games	Cairo, Egypt	1st	110m hurdles	14.03
2008	African Championships	Addis Ababa, Ethiopia	–	110m hurdles	DQ
2009	Mediterranean Games	Pescara, Italy	4th	110m hurdles	13.91
2010	African Championships	Nairobi, Kenya	1st	110m hurdles	13.77
2011	World Championships	Daegu, South Korea	21st (h)	110m hurdles	13.63
2011	All-Africa Games	Maputo, Mozambique	1st	110m hurdles	13.48
2011	Pan Arab Games	Doha, Qatar	2nd	110m hurdles	13.74
2012	World Indoor Championships	Istanbul, Turkey	–	60m hurdles	DQ
2012	African Championships	Porto-Novo, Benin	5th	110m hurdles	13.94
2013	Mediterranean Games	Mersin, Turkey	3rd	110 m hurdles	13.61
2013	World Championships	Moscow, Russia	30th (h)	110m hurdles	14.51
2014	African Championships	Marrakesh, Morocco	6th	110m hurdles	14.27
