= Ruan de Vries =

South African hurdler

Medal record

Men's athletics

Representing South Africa

African Championships
Bronze medal – third place	2006 Bambous	110 m hurdles
Bronze medal – third place	2010 Nairobi	110 m hurdles

Ruan de Vries (born 1 February 1986) is a South African hurdler. In 2010 he competed at the 2010 African Championships in Nairobi and won the bronze medal in the 110-metre hurdles with a time of 13.98 seconds.

== Education ==
He studied at the University of Pretoria.

== Competition record ==
Year	Competition	Venue	Position	Event	Notes
Representing South Africa
2004	World Junior Championships	Grosseto, Italy	11th (sf)	110 m hurdles	14.37 (-0.5 m/s)
2005	African Junior Championships	Radès, Tunisia	1st	110 m hurdles	14.12
2005	African Junior Championships	Radès, Tunisia	1st	4 × 100 m relay	40.60
2006	Commonwealth Games	Melbourne, Australia	14th (h)	110 m hurdles	14.14
2006	African Championships	Bambous, Mauritius	3rd	110 m hurdles	14.05
2007	All-Africa Games	Algiers, Algeria	7th	110 m hurdles	14.05
2010	African Championships	Nairobi, Kenya	3rd	110 m hurdles	13.98
2012	African Championships	Porto-Novo, Benin	10th (h)	110 m hurdles	14.30
2012	African Championships	Porto-Novo, Benin	2nd (h)	4 × 100 m relay	39.47
2014	African Championships	Marrakesh, Morocco	4th	110 m hurdles	13.82
2016	African Championships	Durban, South Africa	7th	110 m hurdles	14.52
2018	African Championships	Asaba, Nigeria	6th	110 m hurdles	13.98
2019	World Championships	Doha, Qatar	33rd (h)	110 m hurdles	14.07
2022	African Championships	Port Louis, Mauritius	9th (h)	110 m hurdles	14.22
