= Athletics at the 2003 All-Africa Games – Men's 3000 metres steeplechase =

The men's 3000 metres steeplechase event at the 2003 All-Africa Games was held on October 13. Ezekiel Kemboi set a then All–Africa Games record with his time of 8:12.27.

== Results ==
Rank	Name	Nationality	Time	Notes
1st place, gold medalist(s)	Ezekiel Kemboi	Kenya	8:12.27	GR
2nd place, silver medalist(s)	Paul Kipsiele Koech	Kenya	8:14.77	
3rd place, bronze medalist(s)	Tewodros Shiferaw	Ethiopia	8:27.33	
4	Luleseged Wale	Ethiopia	8:36.55	
5	Hakim Mazouz	Algeria	8:41.74	
6	Marou Daba	Ethiopia	8:57.12	
7	Joel Chelimo	Kenya	9:03.59	
8	Sivuyile Dlongwana	South Africa	9:07.44	
9	Ronny Marie	Seychelles	9:10.00	
