= Xing Huina =

Chinese long-distance runner

Medal record

Women's Athletics

Representing China

Olympic Games
| Gold medal – first place | 2004 Athens | 10,000 m |

Xing Huina (Chinese: 邢慧娜; pinyin: Xíng Huìnà; born February 25, 1984, in Hanting, Weifang, Shandong) is a former Chinese track and field athlete. She is widely recognised as the most successful Asian female runner of all time, after winning the Athens olympic gold medal in 2004. In a relatively short elite career that effectively ended before the age of 25, her most significant achievement was to win a shock gold in the 2004 Olympic Games in the women's 10,000 m at the age of just 20. Narrowly missing the podium twice in the 2005 World Championships in the following year, the lifetime ban for her coach Wang Dexian for doping his athletes in 2006, and recurrent injuries, derailed her following years. A move to marathon running failed to revitalise her career, and Xing effectively retired in 2009.

== Early life ==
Xing was born to family of farmers in Hanting, Weifang, Shandong. Standing 1.66 m tall and weighing 50 kg (110 lb), she began training at Weifang City Sport School, coached by Chi Yuzhai. She joined the Shandong Sport Technology Institute in 1999, coached by Yin Yanqin.

== Career ==
She was selected into national team in 2002 after running 4:10.43 in 1500 m and 14:56.15 in 5000 m in 2001 Chinese National Games. In national team, she was coached by Wang Dexian. In 2002, she won bronze medal in 10,000 m in Busan Asian Games with 31:42.36. She was the first Asian athlete to be crowned the Olympic champion in this competition.

In 2003, she came in 7th and broke the World Junior Record (30:31.55) in the memorable race of 10,000m at Saint-Denis World Championships. The record was broken by Linet Masai of Kenya at the 2008 Olympics in Beijing.

Xing won the gold medal in the 10,000 m race in the track and field competition at the 2004 Summer Olympics in Athens, Greece with 30:24.36. She overtook Ethiopian Ejagayehu Dibaba in the final straight to break the monopoly of Ethiopians, becoming the first Asian to ever have won an Olympic gold medal in women's 10,000 metres.

In the 2005 World Championships in Helsinki, she placed 5th in women's 5000 m (14:43.64) and 4th in women's 10,000 m (30:27.18). Both races were won by Ethiopian runners.

She decided not to compete at the 2009 National Games of China in 2009 due to a persistent leg injury. The combination of the injury and her long period away from competition raised speculation that her professional career was finished at the age of 26.

== Personal bests ==
- 1500 m: 4:09.01 (2003)
- 5000 m: 14:43.64 (2005)
- 10,000 m: 30:24.36 (2004)

Her unofficial 1500 m personal best is 4:03.00, which was set at the 2005 National Games of China. However, the result was nullified because her opponent, Liu Qing filed a complaint of being deliberately blocked by Xing when Liu tried overtaking Xing.
