= Mohamed Koussi =

Moroccan hurdler (born 1994)

Personal information
- Nationality: Morocco
- Born: 15 March 1994 (32 years, 140 days old)

Sport
- Sport: Athletics
- Events: 110 metres hurdles 60 metres hurdles
- Club: French: Entente Franconville CésameVO

Achievements and titles
- National finals: 2013 Moroccan Champs; • 110m hurdles, 1st (gold); 2013 French U20s; • 110m hurdles, 1st (gold); 2014 Moroccan Champs; • 110m hurdles, 1st (gold); 2014 French U23s; • 110m hurdles, 6th; 2015 French U23s; • 110m hurdles, 3rd (bronze); 2016 French Indoor U23s; • 60m hurdles, 2nd (silver); 2016 French Indoors; • 60m hurdles, 8th; 2016 French U23s; • 110m hurdles, 3rd (bronze); 2017 French Champs; • 110m hurdles, DNF; 2021 Moroccan Champs; • 110m hurdles, 1st (gold)
- Personal bests: 110mH: 13.57 (+1.5) NR (2021) 60mH: 7.69 NR (2018)
Medal record
Men's athletics
Representing Morocco
African Championships
Bronze medal – third place	2016 Durban	110 m hurdles
Arab Championships
Bronze medal – third place	2021 Radès	110 m hurdles
Silver medal – second place	2023 Marrakesh	110 m hurdles
African U20 Championships
Gold medal – first place	2013 Bambous	110 m hurdles
- Updated on 15 January 2024

Mohamed Koussi (born 15 March 1994), also known as Koussi Mohamed, is a Moroccan hurdler specializing in the 110 metres hurdles. He was the bronze medalist at the 2016 African Championships in Athletics in the short hurdles, and he has won a bronze and silver medal at the Arab Athletics Championships. He is also a multiple-time Moroccan Athletics Championships winner and the Moroccan record holder in both the 60 m hurdles and 110 m hurdles.

== Biography ==
Koussi represents Morocco internationally, but he has variously competed at the Moroccan Athletics Championships and French Athletics Championships since 2013, though he has only competed at the Moroccan championships since 2018. He trains with the Entente Franconville CésameVO French athletics club.

He achieved his first international championship experience at the 2013 African Junior Athletics Championships, winning the 110 m hurdles gold medal into a significant -3.6 m/s headwind.

The following year, Koussi broke the Moroccan national record in the 60 metres hurdles indoors, with a 7.99 clocking in the heats of the Eaubonne, France regional U23 championships. Outdoors, he represented France at the 2014 European Champion Clubs Cup, placing 5th in the 110 m hurdles and 7th in the 4 × 100 m relay. At the African Championships, Koussi finished 5th in his semi-final and was the fastest non-qualifier for the finals.

Koussi improved his Moroccan record in the 60 m hurdles a further six times in 2016, the first four times bringing it down to 7.91 in Eaubonne through 13 February. The final two improvements came in Reims, France at the Meeting National En Salle De Reims, to 7.85 and then 7.82 in the finals for 4th place. He set his first outdoor record in the heats at the Meeting Elite de Montgeron-Essonne in Montgeron, with a 13.74 clocking, followed by winning the French Athletics Club Championships in 13.69 seconds. After finishing 4th at the 2016 Mediterranean Athletics U23 Championships and just missing out on a medal, Koussi sought redemption at the 2016 African Championships in Athletics. In the 110 m hurdles, he advanced to the finals and finished 3rd for his first senior international medal.

In 2018 at the Meeting National en Salle des Sacres, Koussi made his final improvement of the Moroccan 60 m hurdles record, with a 7.69 personal best in the heats. Outdoors, Koussi qualified for the finals and finished 7th at the Mediterranean Games. At the following 2018 African Championships in Athletics, Koussi finished 5th in his heat and did not qualify for the finals.

Koussi's next personal best and national record came in 2021, with a 13.57-second 110 m hurdles performance to win the 10th Meeting Fédéral in Rabat followed by a bronze medal at the 2021 Arab Athletics Championships. After not recording any performances in 2022, he would further improve this to 13.49 at the 2023 Meeting National à Thème Bonneuil-sur-Marne. However, due to a phototimer malfunction, the result was not validated as a Moroccan record, leaving the 13.57 performance to stand. He finished his 2023 season with a silver medal at the 2023 Arab Athletics Championships, improving upon his bronze from two years ago.

== Statistics ==
=== Best performances ===
Event	Mark	Place	Competition	Venue	Date	Ref
110 metres hurdles	13.57 (+1.5 m/s) NR	1st	Meeting Fédéral	Rabat, Morocco	11 April 2021	
60 metres hurdles	7.69 NR	(silver) (Round 2)	Meeting National en Salle des Sacres	Reims, France	31 January 2018	
