= 2004 African Championships in Athletics – Men's 110 metres hurdles =

The men's 110 metres hurdles event at the 2004 African Championships in Athletics was held in Brazzaville, Republic of the Congo on July 14.

== Medalists ==
Gold	Silver	Bronze
Todd Matthews-Jouda; Sudan	Shaun Bownes; South Africa	Frikkie van Zyl; South Africa

== Results ==
=== Heats ===
Wind:
Heat 1: +0.1 m/s, Heat 2: -0.1 m/s

Rank	Heat	Name	Nationality	Time	Notes
1	1	Shaun Bownes	South Africa	13.92	Q
2	1	Amadou Diouf	Senegal	14.42	Q
3	1	Julien M'Voutoukoulou	Republic of the Congo	14.84	Q
1	2	Todd Matthews-Jouda	Sudan	13.70	Q
2	2	Frikkie van Zyl	South Africa	13.92	Q
3	2	Boualem Lamri	Algeria	15.05	Q
4	2	Lensley Juhel	Mauritius	15.06	q
5	2	Mohamed Diarra	Mali	15.52	q
6	2	Roger Gouloubi	Republic of the Congo	15.86	

=== Final ===
Wind: +0.1 m/s

Rank	Name	Nationality	Time	Notes
1st place, gold medalist(s)	Todd Matthews-Jouda	Sudan	13.70	CR
2nd place, silver medalist(s)	Shaun Bownes	South Africa	13.80	
3rd place, bronze medalist(s)	Frikkie van Zyl	South Africa	13.81	
4	Amadou Diouf	Senegal	14.15	
5	Boualem Lamri	Algeria	14.85	
6	Julien M'Voutoukoulou	Republic of the Congo	15.26	
7	Mohamed Diarra	Mali	15.33	
8	Lensley Juhel	Mauritius	15.44	
