= Lehann Fourie =

South African hurdler

Medal record

Men's athletics

Representing South Africa

African Championships
Gold medal – first place	2010 Nairobi	4×100 m
Gold medal – first place	2012 Porto-Novo	110 m hurdles

Lehann Fourie (born 16 February 1987 in Heidelberg) is a South African hurdler. He competed at the 2012 Summer Olympics in London, United Kingdom.

He attended Afrikaanse Hoër Seunskool (Afrikaans High School for Boys, also known as Affies), in Pretoria. He graduated from the University of Nebraska–Lincoln in 2010.

His personal best of 13.24s in the 110-metre hurdles is the current African record.

== Competition record ==
Year	Competition	Venue	Position	Event	Notes
Representing South Africa
2005	African Junior Championships	Radès, Tunisia	3rd	110 m hurdles	14.23
2005	African Junior Championships	Radès, Tunisia	1st	4 × 100 m relay	40.60
2006	World Junior Championships	Beijing, China	24th (h)	110 m hurdles (99.0 cm)	14.25 (wind: -0.5 m/s)
2009	Universiade	Belgrade, Serbia	2nd	110 m hurdles	13.66
2009	World Championships	Berlin, Germany	24th (h)	110 m hurdles	13.67
2010	African Championships	Nairobi, Kenya	8th	110 m hurdles	DNF
2010	African Championships	Nairobi, Kenya	1st	4 × 100 m relay	39.12
2011	World Championships	Daegu, South Korea	27th (h)	110 m hurdles	13.86
2012	World Indoor Championships	Istanbul, Turkey	7th	60 m hurdles	7.69
2012	African Championships	Porto-Novo, Benin	1st	110 m hurdles	13.60
2012	Olympic Games	London, United Kingdom	7th	110 m hurdles	13.53
