= Athletics at the 2015 African Games – Men's 110 metres hurdles =

Sports competition in Republic of Congo

The men's 110 metres hurdles event at the 2015 African Games was held on 13 and 14 September 2015.

== Medalists ==
Gold	Silver	Bronze
Antonio Alkana; South Africa	Lyés Mokddel; Algeria	Tyron Akins; Nigeria

== Results ==
=== Heats ===
Qualification: First 3 in each heat (Q) and the next 2 fastest (q) advanced to the final.

Wind:
Heat 1: -0.1 m/s, Heat 2: -0.3 m/s

Rank	Heat	Name	Nationality	Time	Notes
1	2	Antonio Alkana	South Africa	13.60	Q
2	1	Tyron Akins	Nigeria	13.86	Q
3	2	Lyés Mokddel	Algeria	13.93	Q
4	1	Bano Traoré	Mali	14.03	Q
5	1	Kiprono Koskei	Kenya	14.48	Q, SB
6	1	Behailu Alemshet	Ethiopia	14.62	q, NR
7	2	William Mbevi Mutunga	Kenya	14.70	Q
8	1	Michel Itoua	Republic of the Congo	14.86	q, SB
	2	Alex Al-Ameen	Nigeria	DQ	R162.8
	2	Henok Masresha	Ethiopia	DNS	

=== Final ===
Wind: +0.5 m/s

Rank	Lane	Name	Nationality	Time	Notes
1st place, gold medalist(s)	4	Antonio Alkana	South Africa	13.32	GR
2nd place, silver medalist(s)	5	Lyés Mokddel	Algeria	13.49	
3rd place, bronze medalist(s)	6	Tyron Akins	Nigeria	13.54	
4	7	Bano Traoré	Mali	13.87	
5	9	Kiprono Koskei	Kenya	14.30	SB
6	8	William Mbevi Mutunga	Kenya	14.31	SB
7	3	Michel Itoua	Republic of the Congo	14.90	
	2	Behailu Alemshet	Ethiopia	DQ	R168.7
