= Athletics at the 2009 Summer Universiade – Men's 110 metres hurdles =

The men's 110 metres hurdles event at the 2009 Summer Universiade was held on 10–11 July.

== Medalists ==
Gold	Silver	Bronze
Yin Jing; China	Lehann Fourie; South Africa	Emanuele Abate; Italy

== Results ==
=== Heats ===
Qualification: First 3 of each heat (Q) and the next 4 fastest (q) qualified for the semifinals.

Wind:
Heat 1: ? m/s, Heat 2: -1.2 m/s, Heat 3: 0.0 m/s, Heat 4: +0.9 m/s

Rank	Heat	Name	Nationality	Time	Notes
1	1	Jurica Grabušić	Croatia	13.65	Q, SB
2	4	Lehann Fourie	South Africa	13.78	Q, PB
3	1	Ronald Bennett	Honduras	13.80	Q, NR
4	4	Xie Wenjun	China	13.82	Q
5	4	Samuel Coco-Viloin	France	13.87	Q
5	4	Aydar Gilyazov	Russia	13.87	q, PB
5	3	Yin Jing	China	13.87	Q
8	4	Emanuele Abate	Italy	13.89	q
9	3	Juha Sonck	Finland	13.90	Q
10	2	Justin Merlino	Australia	14.05	Q
11	1	Ian McDonald	Ireland	14.14	Q
12	3	John Burstow	Australia	14.16	Q
13	1	Christian de la Calle	Spain	14.18	q
14	2	Antti Korkealaakso	Finland	14.20	Q
15	3	Matúš Janecek	Slovakia	14.24	q
16	4	Jorge McFarlane	Peru	14.30	
17	2	Nenad Lončar	Serbia	14.40	Q
18	2	Jon Yole Bentsen	Denmark	14.43	
19	1	Adnan Malkić	Bosnia and Herzegovina	14.61	
20	2	Ilija Cvijetić	Bosnia and Herzegovina	14.86	SB
21	2	Ernesto Stanley	Paraguay	14.87	PB
22	3	Augusto Stanley	Paraguay	15.06	
23	4	Nikola Marović	Montenegro	15.32	SB
24	1	Wong Wai In	Macau	15.50	PB
	3	Ahmad Hazer	Lebanon	DNF	

=== Semifinals ===
Qualification: First 3 of each semifinal (Q) and the next 2 fastest (q) qualified for the finals.

Wind:
Heat 1: +1.0 m/s, Heat 2: +1.2 m/s

Rank	Heat	Name	Nationality	Time	Notes
1	1	Yin Jing	China	13.50	Q
2	1	Lehann Fourie	South Africa	13.56	Q, PB
3	1	Emanuele Abate	Italy	13.72	Q
4	2	Jurica Grabušić	Croatia	13.75	Q
4	1	Juha Sonck	Finland	13.75	q, SB
6	2	Aydar Gilyazov	Russia	13.86	Q, PB
7	1	Ronald Bennett	Honduras	13.88	q
8	2	Justin Merlino	Australia	13.92	Q
9	2	Xie Wenjun	China	13.93	
10	2	Samuel Coco-Viloin	France	13.95	
11	1	Christian de la Calle	Spain	14.18	
12	1	John Burstow	Australia	14.20	
13	2	Antti Korkealaakso	Finland	14.21	
13	1	Ian McDonald	Ireland	14.21	
15	2	Matúš Janecek	Slovakia	14.35	
16	2	Nenad Lončar	Serbia	14.50	

=== Final ===
Wind: +0.8 m/s

Rank	Lane	Name	Nationality	Time	Notes
1st place, gold medalist(s)	3	Yin Jing	China	13.38	PB
2nd place, silver medalist(s)	5	Lehann Fourie	South Africa	13.66	
3rd place, bronze medalist(s)	7	Emanuele Abate	Italy	13.70	
4	4	Aydar Gilyazov	Russia	13.82	PB
5	2	Juha Sonck	Finland	13.83	
6	8	Justin Merlino	Australia	13.90	
7	6	Jurica Grabušić	Croatia	13.93	
8	1	Ronald Bennett	Honduras	14.06	
