= Todd Matthews-Jouda =

Sudanese hurdler

Medal record

Men's athletics

Representing Sudan

African Championships
Gold medal – first place	2004 Brazzaville	110 m hurdles

Todd Matthews-Jouda (born June 20, 1979) is a hurdling athlete, who is notable for having switched nationality from United States to Sudan in September 2003. His personal best is 13.36 seconds, but being set in 2002 (i.e. before he switched to Sudan), it is not a national record. Instead, his Sudanese record is 13.45, a result which he achieved in October 2004.

Matthews-Jouda competed for the Clemson Tigers track and field team, finishing 2nd in the 110 m hurdles at the 2002 NCAA Division I Outdoor Track and Field Championships.

His first major international tournament for Sudan was the 2003 Afro-Asian Games, where he won a gold medal. Competing for his new nation, Matthews-Jouda became African champion in July 2004 and competed at the Summer Olympics a month later. He was in fact selected as flag bearer for Sudan.

He finished last in his heat at the 2005 World Championships.

== Major achievements ==
Year	Competition	Venue	Position	Notes
Representing the United States
1998	World Junior Championships	Annecy, France	6th	14.40 (wind: -0.2 m/s)
Representing Sudan
2003	All-Africa Games	Abuja, Nigeria	2nd	13.81
2003	Afro-Asian Games	Hyderabad, India	1st	13.68
2004	African Championships	Brazzaville, Republic of the Congo	1st	13.70
2004	Olympic Games	Athens, Greece	27th (qf)	13.77
2004	Pan Arab Games	Algiers, Algeria	1st	13.45
2005	Islamic Solidarity Games	Mecca, Saudi Arabia	2nd	13.79
2005	World Championships	Helsinki, Finland	45th (h)	15.43

Olympic Games
Preceded by Mahmoud Kieno	Flagbearer for Sudan; Athens 2004	Succeeded by Abubaker Kaki Khamis
