= Antonio Alkana =

South African hurdler (born 1990)

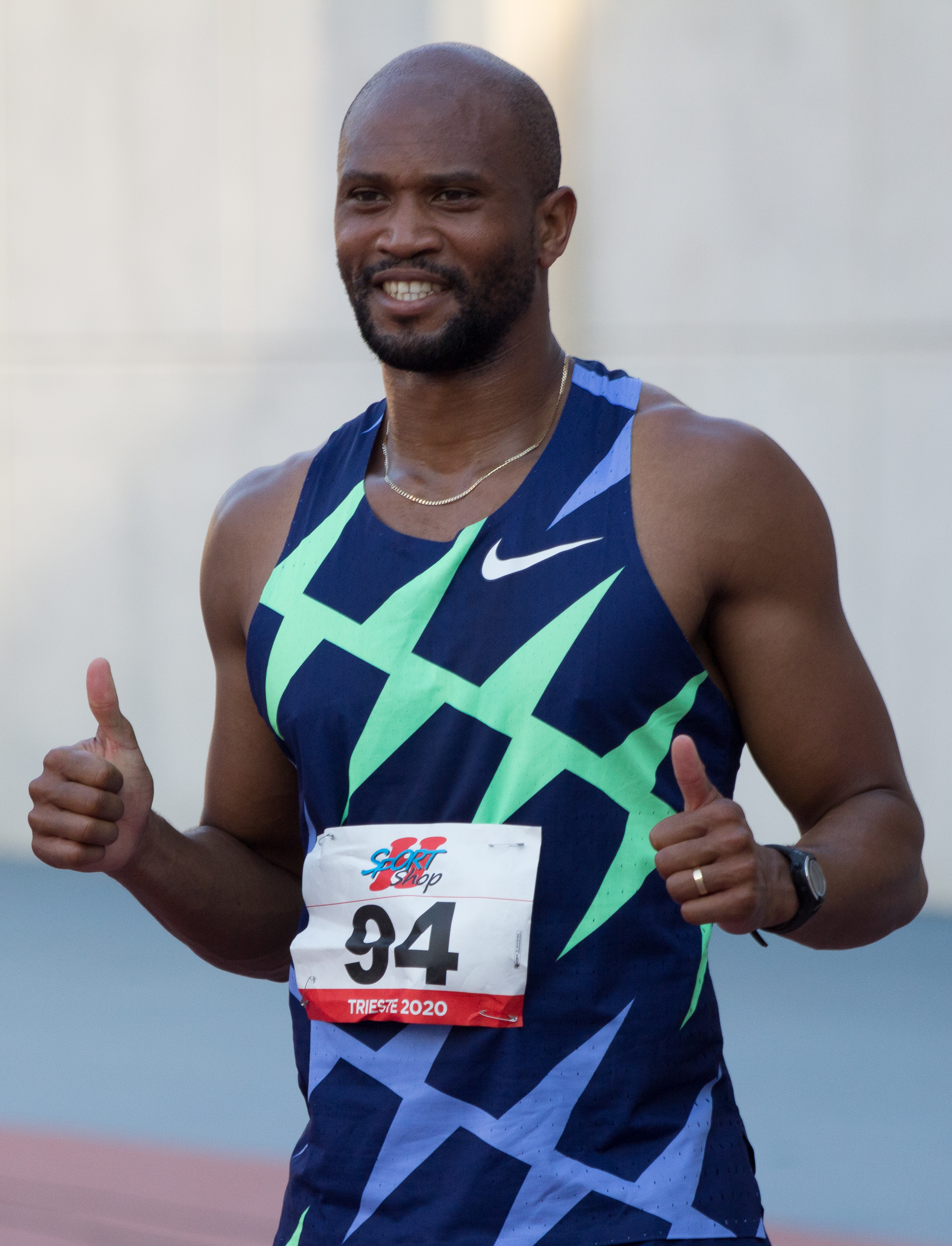
- Antonio Alkana at the 2020 Triveneto Meeting in Trieste, Italy

Personal information
- Born: 12 April 1990 (age 36) Cape Town, South Africa
- Height: 1.83 m (6 ft 0 in)
- Weight: 83 kg (183 lb)

Sport
- Country: South Africa
- Sport: Track and field
- Event: 110 metres hurdles
- Coached by: Marcel Otto
Medal record
Men's athletics
Representing South Africa
All-Africa Games
Gold medal – first place	2015 Brazzaville	110 m hurdles
African Championships
Gold medal – first place	2016 Durban	110 m hurdles
Gold medal – first place	2018 Asaba	110 m hurdles
Silver medal – second place	2022 Mauritius	4×100 m
Bronze medal – third place	2022 Mauritius	110 m hurdles

Antonio Alkana (born 12 April 1990) is a South African hurdler. He competed in the 110 metres hurdles event at the 2015 World Championships in Beijing narrowly missing the semifinals. In addition, he won the gold at the 2015 African Games. He also competed in the men's 110 metres hurdles at the 2020 Summer Olympics.

His personal bests are 13.11 seconds in the 110 metres hurdles (+1.8 m/s, Prague 2017) which is the African record and 7.76 seconds in the 60 metres hurdles (Portland 2016).

== Competition record ==
Year	Competition	Venue	Position	Event	Notes
Representing South Africa
2015	World Championships	Beijing, China	25th (h)	110 m hurdles	13.63
2015	African Games	Brazzaville, Republic of the Congo	1st	110 m hurdles	13.32
2016	World Indoor Championships	Portland, United States	17th (h)	60 m hurdles	7.76
2016	African Championships	Durban, South Africa	1st	110 m hurdles	13.43
2016	African Championships	Durban, South Africa	1st	4 × 100 m relay	40.04
2016	Olympic Games	Rio de Janeiro	17th (sf)	110 m hurdles	13.55
2017	World Championships	London, United Kingdom	16th (sf)	110 m hurdles	13.59
2018	Commonwealth Games	Gold Coast, Australia	5th	110 m hurdles	13.49
2018	African Championships	Asaba, Nigeria	1st	110 m hurdles	13.51
2019	World Championships	Doha, Qatar	9th (sf)	110 m hurdles	13.47
2021	Olympic Games	Tokyo, Japan	22nd (h)	110 m hurdles	13.55
2022	African Championships	Saint Pierre, Mauritius	3rd	110 m hurdles	13.59
2022	African Championships	Saint Pierre, Mauritius	2nd	4 × 100 m relay	39.79
2022	World Championships	Eugene, United States	27th (h)	110 m hurdles	13.64
2023	World Championships	Budapest, Hungary	42nd (h)	110 m hurdles	14.25
2025	World Championships	Tokyo, Japan	33rd (h)	110 m hurdles	13.64
