= Joseph-Berlioz Randriamihaja =

Malagasy hurdler

Medal record

Men's athletics

Representing Madagascar

African Championships
Gold medal – first place	2000 Algiers	110 m hurdles
Silver medal – second place	2002 Radès	110 m hurdles
Silver medal – second place	2006 Bambous	110 m hurdles

Joseph-Berlioz Randriamihaja (born 30 November 1975) is a Malagasy athlete who specializes in the 110 metres hurdles. In his early career he competed in decathlon. He is the current Malagasy record holder in hurdles and former record holder in decathlon.

== Competition record ==
Year	Competition	Venue	Position	Event	Notes
Representing Madagascar
1999	All-Africa Games	Johannesburg, South Africa	2nd	110 m hurdles	13.85
2000	African Championships	Algiers, Algeria	1st	110 m hurdles	13.99
2000	Olympic Games	Sydney, Australia	28th (qf)	110 m hurdles	14.07
2001	Jeux de la Francophonie	Ottawa, Canada	4th	110 m hurdles	13.79
2001	World Championships	Edmonton, Canada	20th (h)	110 m hurdles	13.77
2002	African Championships	Radès, Tunisia	2nd	110 m hurdles	13.80 (w)
2003	World Championships	Paris, France	25th (h)	110 m hurdles	13.80
2003	All-Africa Games	Abuja, Nigeria	1st	110 m hurdles	13.77
2003	Afro-Asian Games	Hyderabad, India	4th	110 m hurdles	13.94
2004	Olympic Games	Athens, Greece	23rd (qf)	110 m hurdles	13.64
2005	World Championships	Helsinki, Finland	26th (h)	110 m hurdles	14.18
2005	Jeux de la Francophonie	Niamey, Niger	3rd	110 m hurdles	14.08
2006	African Championships	Bambous, Mauritius	2nd	110 m hurdles	14.03
2007	All-Africa Games	Algiers, Algeria	2nd	110 m hurdles	13.72
2007	World Championships	Osaka, Japan	33rd (h)	110 m hurdles	13.83
2008	Olympic Games	Beijing, China	36th (h)	110 m hurdles	13.91
2009	World Championships	Berlin, Germany	–	110 m hurdles	DNF
2010	African Championships	Nairobi, Kenya	6th	110 m hurdles	14.11

Olympic Games
Preceded by Dally Randriantefy	Flagbearer for Madagascar; 2000 Sydney	Succeeded by Rosa Rakotozafy
