= Aymen Ben Ahmed =

Tunisian hurdler (born 1986)

Medal record

Men's athletics

Representing Tunisia

African Championships
Gold medal – first place	2006 Bambous	110 m hurdles

Aymen Ben Ahmed (born 1 March 1986) is a Tunisian athlete specializing in the 110 metres hurdles. He won the gold medal at the 2006 African Championships. His personal best in the event is 13.76 s which is the current national record.

== International competitions ==
Year	Competition	Venue	Position	Event	Notes
Representing Tunisia
2004	World Junior Championships	Grosseto, Italy	14th (sf)	110 m hurdles	14.57 (wind: -0.5 m/s)
2004	Pan Arab Games	Algiers, Algeria	3rd	110 m hurdles	13.98 (=NR)
2005	Islamic Solidarity Games	Mecca, Saudi Arabia	8th	110 m hurdles	14.26
2006	African Championships	Bambous, Mauritius	1st	110 m hurdles	13.77
2007	All-Africa Games	Algiers, Algeria	4th	110 m hurdles	13.81
2009	Mediterranean Games	Pescara, Italy	5th	110 m hurdles	13.92
2009	Jeux de la Francophonie	Beirut, Lebanon	3rd	110 m hurdles	14.07
