= 2010 African Championships in Athletics – Women's 5000 metres =

The women's 5000 metres at the 2010 African Championships in Athletics were held on July 29.

== Results ==
Rank	Name	Nationality	Time	Notes
1st place, gold medalist(s)	Vivian Cheruiyot	Kenya	16:18.72	
2nd place, silver medalist(s)	Meseret Defar	Ethiopia	16:20.54	
3rd place, bronze medalist(s)	Sentayehu Ejigu	Ethiopia	16:22.32	
4	Iness Chenonge	Kenya	16:22.65	
5	Sule Utura	Ethiopia	16:26.21	
6	Esther Chemtai	Kenya	16:29.25	
7	Zakia Mohamed Mrisho	Tanzania	16:38.57	
8	Claudette Mukasakindi	Rwanda	17:27.92	
9	Anastazia Msandai	Tanzania	17:28.48	
10	Pauline Niyongere	Burundi	18:07.53	
11	Simone Zapha	Seychelles	20:09.51	
	Agnes Chikwakwa	Malawi	DNS	
	Zeitun Jumanne	Tanzania	DNS	
