= Bano Traoré =

French hurdler

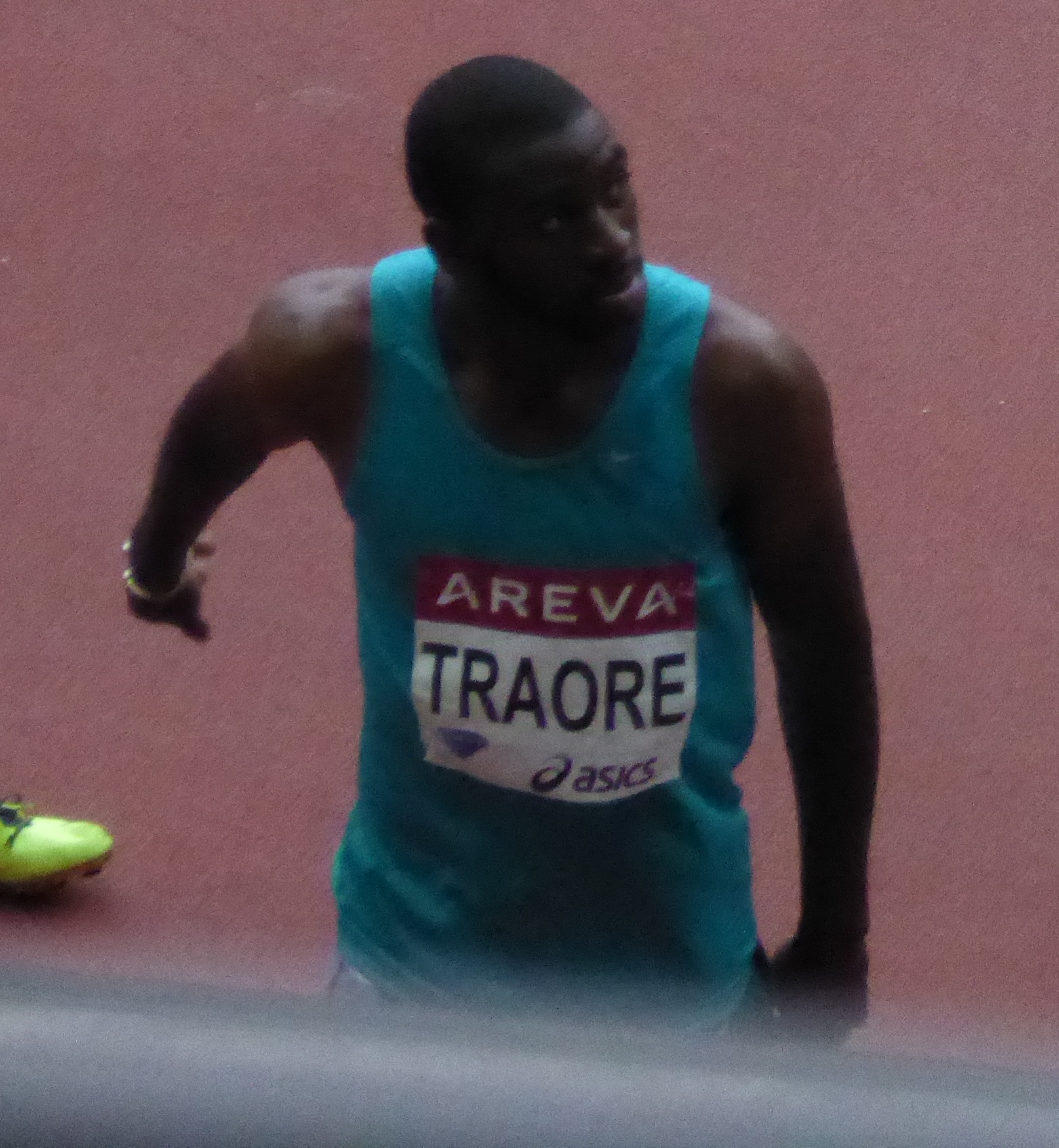
Traoré in 2015

Bano Traoré (born 25 April 1985 in Ivry-sur-Seine) is a French-Malian athlete who specialises in the 110 meter hurdles.

Traoré initially represented his birth country, France. He competed at the 2007 World Athletics Championships and the 2007 European Athletics Indoor Championships. He later began competing for Mali, where his parents come from.

== Competition record ==
Year	Competition	Venue	Position	Event	Notes
Representing France
2003	European Junior Championships	Tampere, Finland	1st	110 m hurdles	13.95
2004	World Junior Championships	Grosseto, Italy	9th (h)	110 m hurdles	14.11
2005	European U23 Championships	Erfurt, Germany	4th (h)	110 m hurdles	13.82 w (+2.3 m/s)
2007	European Indoor Championships	Birmingham, United Kingdom	20th (h)	60 m hurdles	7.97
2007	European U23 Championships	Debrecen, Hungary	3rd (h)	110 m hurdles	13.78 (+0.3 m/s)
2007	World Championships	Osaka, Japan	34th (h)	110 m hurdles	13.84
Representing Mali
2014	African Championships	Marrakesh, Morocco	5th	110 m hurdles	14.04
2015	World Championships	Beijing, China	33rd (h)	110m hurdles	13.91
2015	African Games	Brazzaville, Republic of the Congo	4th	110 m hurdles	13.87
2016	African Championships	Durban, South Africa	5th	110 m hurdles	14.22

== See also ==
- Sub-Saharan African community of Paris
