= 2008 African Championships in Athletics – Men's 110 metres hurdles =

The men's 110 metres hurdles event at the 2008 African Championships in Athletics was held at the Addis Ababa Stadium on May 3.

== Results ==
Wind: -0.3 m/s

Rank	Lane	Name	Nationality	Time	Notes
1st place, gold medalist(s)	4	Hennie Kotze	South Africa	13.95	FS1
2nd place, silver medalist(s)	1	Samuel Okon	Nigeria	14.08	
3rd place, bronze medalist(s)	5	Nurudeen Salim	Nigeria	14.27	
4	3	Janko Kotze	South Africa	14.31	
5	8	Zelalem Chemdesa	Ethiopia	15.04	NR
6	2	Ubang Abaya	Ethiopia	15.07	
7	7	Bariso Guye	Ethiopia	15.88	
	6	Othmane Hadj Lazib	Algeria	DQ	FS1
