= 2014 African Championships in Athletics – Men's 110 metres hurdles =

The men's 110 metres hurdles event at the 2014 African Championships in Athletics was held August 12–13 on Stade de Marrakech.

== Medalists ==
Gold	Silver	Bronze
Tyron Akins; Nigeria	Alex Al-Ameen; Nigeria	Martins Ogierakhi; Nigeria

== Results ==
=== Heats ===
Qualification: First 3 of each heat (Q) and the next 2 fastest (q) qualified for the final.

Wind: Heat 1: 0.0 m/s, Heat 2: -0.3 m/s

Rank	Heat	Name	Nationality	Time	Notes
1	2	Tyron Akins	Nigeria	13.77	Q
2	2	Martins Ogierakhi	Nigeria	13.87	Q
3	1	Alex Al-Ameen	Nigeria	13.89	Q
4	2	Othman Hadj Lazib	Algeria	14.07	Q
5	2	Bano Traoré	Mali	14.12	q
6	1	Ruan de Vries	South Africa	14.14	Q
7	1	Lyes Mokddel	Algeria	14.17	Q
8	1	Moussa Dembélé	Senegal	14.23	q
9	2	Mohamed Koussi	Morocco	14.29	
10	2	Amadou Gueye	Senegal	14.40	
11	2	Antonio Vieillesse	Mauritius	14.58	
12	1	Behailu Alemshet	Ethiopia	14.73	NR
	1	Fred-Charles Pieterse	Namibia	DQ	
	1	Angonga	Republic of the Congo	DNS	

=== Final ===
Wind: +0.5 m/s

Rank	Lane	Name	Nationality	Time	Notes
1st place, gold medalist(s)	4	Tyron Akins	Nigeria	13.57	
2nd place, silver medalist(s)	3	Alex Al-Ameen	Nigeria	13.78	
3rd place, bronze medalist(s)	5	Martins Ogierakhi	Nigeria	13.80	
4	6	Ruan de Vries	South Africa	13.82	
5	1	Bano Traoré	Mali	14.04	
6	8	Othman Hadj Lazib	Algeria	14.27	
	7	Lyès Mokddel	Algeria	DQ	R168.7b
	2	Moussa Dembélé	Senegal	DNF	
