= Moussa Dembélé (hurdler) =

Senegalese hurdler

Personal information
- Nationality: Senegal
- Born: 30 October 1988 (age 37) Guédiawaye, Senegal
- Height: 6 ft 0 in (1.83 m)
- Weight: 172 lb (78 kg)

Sport
- Sport: Track and field
- Event: 110 metres hurdles

Moussa Dembélé (born 30 October 1988) is a Senegalese athlete competing in the sprint hurdles. He represented his country at the 2012 Summer Olympics but was disqualified after falling at the 8th hurdle.

His personal bests are 13.70 seconds in the 110 metres hurdles (+1.5 m/s, New York City 2013) and 7.75 seconds in the 60 metres hurdles (Hampton 2013).

== Competition record ==
Year	Competition	Venue	Position	Event	Notes
Representing Senegal
2006	World Junior Championships	Beijing, China	21st (h)	4 × 100 m relay	43.21
2007	African Junior Championships	Ouagadougou, Burkina Faso	3rd	110 m hurdles (99 cm)	14.36
2011	All-Africa Games	Maputo, Mozambique	5th	110 m hurdles	14.11
2012	African Championships	Porto-Novo, Benin	7th	110 m hurdles	14.32
2012	Olympic Games	London, United Kingdom	–	110 m hurdles	DQ
2014	African Championships	Marrakesh, Morocco	8th (h)	110 m hurdles	14.23 (Note: Did not finish in the final)
2014	African Championships	Marrakesh, Morocco	7th	4 × 100 m relay	40.50
2016	World Indoor Championships	Portland, United States	26th (h)	60 m hurdles	7.99
