= 2008 African Championships in Athletics – Women's 10,000 metres =

The women's 10,000 metres event at the 2008 African Championships in Athletics was held at the Addis Ababa Stadium on May 3.

== Results ==
Rank	Name	Nationality	Time	Notes
1st place, gold medalist(s)	Tirunesh Dibaba	Ethiopia	32:49.08	
2nd place, silver medalist(s)	Ejegayehu Dibaba	Ethiopia	32:50.36	
3rd place, bronze medalist(s)	Wude Ayalew	Ethiopia	32:55.17	
4	Lucy Wangui	Kenya	33:52.11	
5	Janeth John Yuda	Tanzania	35:32.60	
6	Sara Ramadhan	Tanzania	36:06.03	
7	Claudette Mukasakindi	Rwanda	37:24.39	
8	Mediatrice Kwizera	Burundi	37:27.47	
9	Godelieve Nizigiyimana	Burundi	37:57.37	
	Angeline Nyiransabimana	Rwanda	DNF	
	Zaitoni Jumanne	Tanzania	DNS	
