= 2002 African Championships in Athletics – Women's 5000 metres =

The women's 5000 metres event at the 2002 African Championships in Athletics was held in Radès, Tunisia on August 6.

== Results ==
Rank	Name	Nationality	Time	Notes
1st place, gold medalist(s)	Berhane Adere	Ethiopia	15:51.08	
2nd place, silver medalist(s)	Dorcus Inzikuru	Uganda	15:54.22	
3rd place, bronze medalist(s)	Ejegayehu Dibaba	Ethiopia	15:56.02	
4	Asmae Leghzaoui	Morocco	15:58.94	
5	Soulef Bouguerra	Tunisia	16:18.77	
6	Bouchra Chaabi	Morocco	16:28.02	
7	Fouzia Zoutat	Algeria	16:29.11	
8	Simret Sultan	Eritrea	16:35.38	
9	Hana Chaouach	Tunisia	16:36.75	
10	Hakima Takeznount	Algeria	16:52.74	
11	Habiba Ghribi	Tunisia	17:02.12	
12	Anesie Kwizera	Burundi	17:09.33	
13	Epiphanie Nyirabarame	Rwanda	17:12.23	
	Leah Malot	Kenya	DNS	
	Edith Masai	Kenya	DNS	
	Hind Musa	Sudan	DNS	
