= Athletics at the 2004 Summer Olympics – Women's 5000 metres =

Women's 5000 metres at the Games of the XXVIII Olympiad
- Olympic Athletics
- Venue: Athens Olympic Stadium
- Dates: 20–23 August
- Competitors: 41 from 28 nations
- Winning time: 14:45.65

Medalists
1st place, gold medalist(s)		Meseret Defar	Ethiopia
2nd place, silver medalist(s)		Isabella Ochichi	Kenya
3rd place, bronze medalist(s)		Tirunesh Dibaba	Ethiopia

The women's 5000 metres at the 2004 Summer Olympics as part of the athletics program were held at the Athens Olympic Stadium on August 20 and 23.

The final started out slowly and dismally, as none of the entrants wanted to take the lead. With the tightly packed field passing through the 400 metres, many runners started to fall behind and could not handle the pace set by early leaders Sun Yingjie and Xing Huina. Approaching to the halfway mark of the race, Turkey's world-record holder Elvan Abeylegesse surpassed the Chinese duo to charge into the lead and the pace began to accelerate quickly. Ethiopia's Meseret Defar and Kenya's Isabella Ochichi came immediately to the front of the pack, keeping an eye on the leader. With only three laps to go, Abeylegesse struggled to maintain her pace until she finally faded on the backstretch, leaving Defar and Ochichi to exchange the leading duties throughout the race and battle out for the gold. Moments after the bell, Ochichi continued to lead from the rest of the field, but Defar patiently passed her with only 200 metres to go, and then stormed away to her first Olympic title, finishing at 14:45.65. Ochichi had nothing left to respond with, but came through behind her to get the silver, while Defar's teammate Tirunesh Dibaba overhauled the weary Abeylegesse to hold on for the bronze.

== Records ==
Prior to the competition, the existing World record, Olympic record, and world leading time were as follows:

World record	Elvan Abeylegesse (TUR)	14:24.68	Bergen, Norway	11 June 2004
Olympic record	Gabriela Szabó (ROM)	14:40.79	Sydney, Australia	25 September 2000
World Leading	Elvan Abeylegesse (TUR)	14:24.68	Bergen, Norway	11 June 2004

No new records were set during the competition.

== Qualification ==
The qualification period for athletics was 1 January 2003 to 9 August 2004. For the women's 5000 metres, each National Olympic Committee was permitted to enter up to three athletes that had run the race in 15:08.70 or faster during the qualification period. If an NOC had no athletes that qualified under that standard, one athlete that had run the race in 15:20.45 or faster could be entered.

== Schedule ==
All times are Greece Standard Time (UTC+2)

Date	Time	Round
Friday, 20 August 2004	23:20	Round 1
Monday, 23 August 2004	22:00	Final

== Results ==
=== Round 1 ===
Qualification rule: The first five finishers in each heat (Q) plus the next five fastest overall runners (q) advanced to the final.

==== Heat 1 ====
Rank	Name	Nationality	Time	Notes
1	Tirunesh Dibaba	Ethiopia	15:00.66	Q
2	Sentayehu Ejigu	Ethiopia	15:01.31	Q
3	Yelena Zadorozhnaya	Russia	15:01.77	Q
4	Liliya Shobukhova	Russia	15:01.86	Q
5	Edith Masai	Kenya	15:01.92	Q
6	Irina Mikitenko	Germany	15:02.16	q
7	Sun Yingjie	China	15:03.00	q, SB
8	Émilie Mondor	Canada	15:20.15	
9	Marla Runyan	United States	15:24.88	
10	Tezeta Sürekli	Turkey	15:26.64	
11	Kim Smith	New Zealand	15:31.80	
12	Dorcus Inzikuru	Uganda	15:38.59	
13	Shayne Culpepper	United States	15:40.02	
14	Ebru Kavaklıoğlu	Turkey	15:52.39	
15	Maria McCambridge	Ireland	15:57.42	
16	Souad Aït Salem	Algeria	16:02.10	
17	Dulce María Rodríguez	Mexico	16:08.07	
18	Zainab Bakkour	Syria	17:18.66	
19	Francine Niyonizigiye	Burundi	17:21.27	
	Elizabeth Zaragoza	El Salvador	DNF	

==== Heat 2 ====
Rank	Name	Nationality	Time	Notes
1	Meseret Defar	Ethiopia	14:52.39	Q
2	Elvan Abeylegesse	Turkey	14:54.80	Q
3	Joanne Pavey	Great Britain	14:55.45	Q
4	Isabella Ochichi	Kenya	14:55.69	Q
5	Xing Huina	China	14:56.01	Q, PB
6	Margaret Maury	France	14:56.79	q, PB
7	Sonia O'Sullivan	Ireland	14:59.61	q
8	Gulnara Samitova	Russia	15:05.78	q
9	Jane Wanjiku	Kenya	15:14.57	
10	Kirsi Valasti	Finland	15:33.78	
11	Shalane Flanagan	United States	15:34.63	
12	Maria Protopappa	Greece	15:35.07	
13	Volha Krautsova	Belarus	15:44.01	
14	Restituta Joseph	Tanzania	15:45.11	
15	Catherine Chikwakwa	Malawi	15:46.17	
16	Courtney Babcock	Canada	15:47.35	
17	Krisztina Papp	Hungary	15:58.44	
18	Inês Monteiro	Portugal	16:03.75	
19	Supriyati Sutono	Indonesia	16:34.14	SB
20	Nebiat Habtemariam	Eritrea	16:49.01	
21	Inés Melchor	Peru	17:08.07	

=== Final ===
Rank	Name	Nationality	Time	Notes
1st place, gold medalist(s)	Meseret Defar	Ethiopia	14:45.65	
2nd place, silver medalist(s)	Isabella Ochichi	Kenya	14:48.19	
3rd place, bronze medalist(s)	Tirunesh Dibaba	Ethiopia	14:51.83	
4	Yelena Zadorozhnaya	Russia	14:55.52	
5	Joanne Pavey	Great Britain	14:57.87	
6	Gulnara Samitova	Russia	15:02.30	
7	Irina Mikitenko	Germany	15:03.36	
8	Sun Yingjie	China	15:07.23	
9	Xing Huina	China	15:07.41	
10	Sentayehu Ejigu	Ethiopia	15:09.55	
11	Margaret Maury	France	15:09.77	
12	Elvan Abeylegesse	Turkey	15:12.64	
13	Liliya Shobukhova	Russia	15:15.64	
14	Sonia O'Sullivan	Ireland	16:20.90	
	Edith Masai	Kenya	DNF	
