= 1998 World Junior Championships in Athletics – Men's 110 metres hurdles =

The men's 110 metres hurdles event at the 1998 World Junior Championships in Athletics was held in Annecy, France, at Parc des Sports on 31 July, 1 and 2 August. 106.7 cm (3'6) (senior implement) hurdles were used.

== Medalists ==
Gold	Staņislavs Olijars; Latvia
Silver	Sharif Paxton; United States
Bronze	Florian Seibold; Germany

== Results ==
=== Final ===
2 August
Wind: -0.2 m/s

Rank	Name	Nationality	Time	Notes
1st place, gold medalist(s)	Staņislavs Olijars	Latvia	13.51	
2nd place, silver medalist(s)	Sharif Paxton	United States	14.10	
3rd place, bronze medalist(s)	Florian Seibold	Germany	14.21	
4	Ben Warmington	United Kingdom	14.33	
5	Gergely Palágyi	Hungary	14.39	
6	Todd Matthews	United States	14.40	
7	Shinri Yamada	Japan	14.47	
8	Dimítrios Piétris	Greece	14.89	

=== Semifinals ===
1 August

==== Semifinal 1 ====
Wind: 0.0 m/s

Rank	Name	Nationality	Time	Notes
1	Sharif Paxton	United States	14.12	Q
2	Dimítrios Piétris	Greece	14.26	Q
3	Gergely Palágyi	Hungary	14.36	Q
4	Ben Warmington	United Kingdom	14.45	Q
5	Robert Grams	Germany	14.49	
6	Giorgio Berdini	Italy	14.52	
7	Salih Keljalic	Bosnia and Herzegovina	14.81	
8	Désiré Delric	France	15.02	

==== Semifinal 2 ====
Wind: -1.6 m/s

Rank	Name	Nationality	Time	Notes
1	Staņislavs Olijars	Latvia	13.81	Q
2	Shinri Yamada	Japan	14.24	Q
3	Todd Matthews	United States	14.24	Q
4	Florian Seibold	Germany	14.40	Q
5	Artur Budziłło	Poland	14.49	
6	György Kovács	Hungary	14.55	
7	Robert Newton	United Kingdom	14.69	
8	Marko Ritola	Finland	14.77	

=== Heats ===
31 July

==== Heat 1 ====
Wind: -0.8 m/s

Rank	Name	Nationality	Time	Notes
1	Désiré Delric	France	14.30	Q
2	Gergely Palágyi	Hungary	14.48	Q
3	Marko Ritola	Finland	14.53	Q
4	Yoshihiro Hisano	Japan	14.62	
5	Martinos Adamopoulos	Greece	14.73	
6	Felipe Vivancos	Spain	14.74	
7	Alessandro Battinelli	Italy	14.77	

==== Heat 2 ====
Wind: -1.2 m/s

Rank	Name	Nationality	Time	Notes
1	Staņislavs Olijars	Latvia	13.65	Q
2	Todd Matthews	United States	14.13	Q
3	Shinri Yamada	Japan	14.15	Q
4	Robert Newton	United Kingdom	14.56	q
5	Benoît Yameundjeu	France	14.63	
6	José Vidal	Spain	14.64	
7	William Wicks	Australia	15.11	

==== Heat 3 ====
Wind: -0.3 m/s

Rank	Name	Nationality	Time	Notes
1	György Kovács	Hungary	14.36	Q
2	Dimítrios Piétris	Greece	14.42	Q
3	Salih Keljalic	Bosnia and Herzegovina	14.43	Q
4	Florian Seibold	Germany	14.44	q
5	Vytautas Kancleris	Lithuania	14.65	
6	Robson dos Santos	Brazil	14.65	
7	Claude Godart	Luxembourg	14.75	
8	Shah Dilawar Hossain	Bangladesh	15.31	

==== Heat 4 ====
Wind: +0.2 m/s

Rank	Name	Nationality	Time	Notes
1	Sharif Paxton	United States	14.01	Q
2	Artur Budziłło	Poland	14.09	Q
3	Ben Warmington	United Kingdom	14.25	Q
4	Giorgio Berdini	Italy	14.45	q
5	Robert Grams	Germany	14.46	q
6	Adam Dorey	Australia	14.63	
7	Ah Chong Sam Chong	Samoa	15.78	

== Participation ==
According to an unofficial count, 29 athletes from 19 countries participated in the event.

- Australia (2)
- Bangladesh (1)
- Bosnia and Herzegovina (1)
- Brazil (1)
- Finland (1)
- France (2)
- Germany (2)
- Greece (2)
- Hungary (2)
- Italy (2)
- Japan (2)
- Latvia (1)
- Lithuania (1)
- Luxembourg (1)
- Poland (1)
- Samoa (1)
- Spain (2)
- United Kingdom (2)
- United States (2)
