= Tyron Akins =

Nigerian-American hurdler

Personal information
- Nationality: American, Nigerian
- Born: 6 January 1986 (age 40) Bainbridge, Georgia, United States
- Education: Auburn University
- Height: 5 ft 11 in (180 cm)
- Weight: 175

Sport
- Sport: Track and field
- Event: 110 metres hurdles
- College team: Auburn Tigers
- Coached by: Ralph Spry
Medal record
Men's athletics
Representing Nigeria
All-Africa Games
Bronze medal – third place	2015 Brazzaville	110 m hurdles
African Championships
Gold medal – first place	2014 Marrakesh	110 m hurdles
Silver medal – second place	2016 Durban	110 m hurdles

Tyron Akins (born 6 January 1986) is a US-born hurdler competing internationally for Nigeria. He switched allegiance from his country of birth to Nigeria in 2014 and has since won several medals on the continental level.

His personal bests are 13.25 seconds in the 110 metres hurdles (+0.4, Des Moines 2008) and 7.60 seconds in the 60 metres hurdles (Liévin 2009).

== Competition record ==
Year	Competition	Venue	Position	Event	Notes
Representing the United States
2005	Pan American Junior Championships	Windsor, Canada	2nd	110 m hurdles	14.00
Representing Nigeria
2014	Commonwealth Games	Glasgow, United Kingdom	9th (sf)	110 m hurdles	13.75
2014	African Championships	Marrakesh, Morocco	1st	110 m hurdles	13.57
2014	Continental Cup	Marrakesh, Morocco	5th	110 m hurdles	13.48
2015	African Games	Brazzaville, Republic of the Congo	3rd	110 m hurdles	13.54
2016	African Championships	Durban, South Africa	2nd	110 m hurdles	13.74
