= Athletics at the 2004 Summer Olympics – Women's 10,000 metres =

Women's 10,000 metres at the Games of the XXVIII Olympiad
- Olympic Athletics
- Venue: Athens Olympic Stadium
- Dates: 27 August
- Competitors: 31 from 20 nations
- Winning time: 30:24.36

Medalists
1st place, gold medalist(s)		Xing Huina	China
2nd place, silver medalist(s)		Ejagayehu Dibaba	Ethiopia
3rd place, bronze medalist(s)		Derartu Tulu	Ethiopia

The women's 10,000 metres at the 2004 Summer Olympics were held as part of the athletics program at the Athens Olympic Stadium on August 27. No preliminary rounds were held at this distance, since the number of competitors allowed a direct final.

Like Fernanda Ribeiro at the 2000 Summer Olympics, defending champion Derartu Tulu was not able to maintain her title, finishing in the third place behind compatriot (and cousin) Ejegayehu Dibaba and the winner Xing Huina. In Athens, Ribeiro did not finish the race due to fatigue, along with British marathon world record holder Paula Radcliffe. Throughout the race, Xing marked the Ethiopian favorites, not taking the lead until the home stretch with a final kick Dibabba could not match. Xing's final lap was just under 63 seconds.

== Records ==
Prior to the competition, the existing World record, Olympic record, and world leading time were as follows.

World record	Wang Junxia (CHN)	29:31.78	Beijing, China	8 September 1993
Olympic record	Derartu Tulu (ETH)	30:17.49	Sydney, Australia	30 September 2000
World Leading	Paula Radcliffe (GBR)	30:17.15	Gateshead, United Kingdom	27 June 2004

No new records were set during the competition.

== Qualification ==
The qualification period for athletics was 1 January 2003 to 9 August 2004. For the women's 10,000 metres, each National Olympic Committee was permitted to enter up to three athletes that had run the race in 31:45.00 or faster during the qualification period. If an NOC had no athletes that qualified under that standard, one athlete that had run the race in 32:17.00 or faster could be entered.

== Schedule ==
All times are Greece Standard Time (UTC+2)

Date	Time	Round
Friday, 27 August 2004	21:50	Final

== Results ==
Rank	Name	Nationality	Time	Notes
1st place, gold medalist(s)	Xing Huina	China	30:24.36	PB
2nd place, silver medalist(s)	Ejegayehu Dibaba	Ethiopia	30:24.98	PB
3rd place, bronze medalist(s)	Derartu Tulu	Ethiopia	30:26.42	SB
4	Werknesh Kidane	Ethiopia	30:28.30	
5	Lornah Kiplagat	Netherlands	30:31.92	
6	Sun Yingjie	China	30:54.37	SB
7	Jeļena Prokopčuka	Latvia	31:04.10	NR
8	Lidiya Grigoryeva	Russia	31:04.62	
9	Lucy Wangui	Kenya	31:05.90	PB
10	Helena Javornik	Slovenia	31:06.63	NR
11	Mihaela Botezan	Romania	31:11.24	NR
12	Kathy Butler	Great Britain	31:41.13	
13	Megumi Oshima	Japan	31:42.18	
14	Marie Davenport	Ireland	31:50.49	
15	Sabrina Mockenhaupt	Germany	32:00.85	
16	Alice Timbilil	Kenya	32:12.57	
17	Sally Barsosio	Kenya	32:14.00	
18	Harumi Hiroyama	Japan	32:15.12	
19	Elva Dryer	United States	32:18.16	
20	Anikó Kálovics	Hungary	32:21.47	
21	Kate O'Neill	United States	32:24.04	
22	Galina Bogomolova	Russia	32:25.10	
23	Adriana Fernández	Mexico	32:29.57	
24	Benita Johnson	Australia	32:32.01	
25	Haley McGregor	Australia	33:35.27	
26	Kayoko Fukushi	Japan	33:48.66	
27	Natalia Cercheș	Moldova	34:04.97	
	Souad Aït Salem	Algeria	DNF	
	Natalya Berkut	Ukraine	DNF	
	Paula Radcliffe	Great Britain	DNF	
	Fernanda Ribeiro	Portugal	DNF	
