= Selim Nurudeen =

Nigerian hurdler

Personal information
- Born: 1 February 1983 (age 43)
- Height: 6 ft 1 in (1.85 m)

Sport
- Country: Nigeria
- Sport: Track and field
- College team: Notre Dame
Medal record
Men's athletics
Representing Nigeria
All-Africa Games
Gold medal – first place	2007 Algiers	110 m hurdles
Silver medal – second place	2011 Maputo	110 m hurdles
African Championships
Silver medal – second place	2010 Nairobi	110 m hurdles
Silver medal – second place	2012 Porto-Novo	110 m hurdles
Bronze medal – third place	2008 Addis Ababa	110 m hurdles

Selim Nurudeen (born 1 February 1983) is a hurdler from Nigeria. In 2010 he competed at the 2010 African Championships in Nairobi, Kenya, and won the silver medal in the 110 metre hurdles with a time of 13.83 seconds. He has twice represented Nigeria at the Olympics, in 2008 and 2012. He currently holds Nigerian athletic records in the indoor 60 meter hurdles with a time of 7.64.

At the 2005 NCAA Division I Indoor Track and Field Championships, Nurudeen was an All-American in the 60 metres hurdles for the Notre Dame Fighting Irish track and field team.
