= Athletics at the 2003 All-Africa Games – Men's 110 metres hurdles =

The men's 110 metres hurdles at the 2003 All-Africa Games were held on October 11–12.

== Medalists ==
Gold	Silver	Bronze
Joseph-Berlioz Randriamihaja; Madagascar	Todd Matthews-Jouda; Sudan	Frikkie Van Zyl; South Africa

== Results ==
=== Heats ===
Qualification: First 3 of each heat (Q) and the next 2 fastest (q) qualified for the semifinal.

Wind:
Heat 1: -0.2 m/s, Heat 2: -0.2 m/s

Rank	Heat	Name	Nationality	Time	Notes
1	2	Frikkie Van Zyl	South Africa	13.91	Q
2	1	William Erese	Nigeria	13.96	Q
3	2	Joseph-Berlioz Randriamihaja	Madagascar	13.97	Q
4	1	Félou Doudou Sow	Senegal	14.07	Q
5	1	Todd Matthews-Jouda	Sudan	14.15	Q
6	2	Dienma Afiesimama	Nigeria	14.20	Q
7	1	Arlindo Leócadio Pinheiro	São Tomé and Príncipe	15.38	q
8	2	Chinedu Elekwa	Nigeria	15.95	q
	2	Abderrahmane Dali Bey	Algeria	DQ	
	2	Amadou Diouf	Senegal	DQ	
	1	Sultan Tucker	Liberia	DNS	

=== Final ===
Wind: -0.6 m/s

Rank	Name	Nationality	Time	Notes
1st place, gold medalist(s)	Joseph-Berlioz Randriamihaja	Madagascar	13.77	
2nd place, silver medalist(s)	Todd Matthews-Jouda	Sudan	13.81	
3rd place, bronze medalist(s)	Frikkie Van Zyl	South Africa	13.94	
4	Félou Doudou Sow	Senegal	14.14	
5	Dienma Afiesimama	Nigeria	14.25	
6	Chinedu Elekwa	Nigeria	14.30	
7	Arlindo Leócadio Pinheiro	São Tomé and Príncipe	15.53	
	William Erese	Nigeria	DQ	
