= Athletics at the 2004 Summer Olympics – Men's 5000 metres =

Men's 5000 metres at the Games of the XXVIII Olympiad
- Olympic Athletics
- Venue: Athens Olympic Stadium
- Dates: 25–28 August
- Competitors: 36 from 22 nations
- Winning time: 13:14.39

Medalists
1st place, gold medalist(s)		Hicham El Guerrouj	Morocco
2nd place, silver medalist(s)		Kenenisa Bekele	Ethiopia
3rd place, bronze medalist(s)		Eliud Kipchoge	Kenya

Official Video Highlights

The men's 5,000 metres at the 2004 Summer Olympics as part of the athletics program were held at the Athens Olympic Stadium on August 25 and 28. The winning margin was 0.20 seconds.

The final witnessed an epic clash between two track greats from different generations: in his final competitive international race, 1500m champion and track legend Hicham El Guerrouj of Morocco and 10,000m Olympic champion, world record holder at the distance and rising star 21-year-old Kenenisa Bekele of Ethiopia. The race had a preview at the World Championships a year earlier. There the medalists were barely separated, but the young World Junior record holder Eliud Kipchoge upset the stars by taking gold after El Guerrouj had tried to break away on the final lap.

Here Bekele took an early lead, but instead chose not to push the pace. That duty fell onto Kipchoge, who had watched from behind the year before. Here, El Guerrouj spent most of the race watching from several places behind the lead. As the last lap began, El Guerrouj moved toward the front. Bekele challenged Kipchoge with 200 metres to go. It was a shoulder to shoulder all out sprint battle as Kipchoge refused to let Bekele by, but he couldn't hold him off. Bekele broke out at a lead of several metres. El Guerrouj first ran down Kipchoge, then overhauled the Ethiopian in the final strides to win by just two tenths of a second. With this, El Guerrouj set a historic milestone as the first ever athlete to strike a distance double (1500–5000) since Paavo Nurmi did so in 1924, denying Bekele a chance to do the Olympic 5000m and 10,000m double – which he would ultimately win four years later in Beijing.

== Records ==
Prior to the competition, the existing World record, Olympic record, and world leading time were as follows:

World record	Kenenisa Bekele (ETH)	12:37.35	Hengelo, Netherlands	31 May 2004
Olympic record	Saïd Aouita (MAR)	13:05.59	Los Angeles, United States	11 August 1984
World Leading	Kenenisa Bekele (ETH)	12:37.35	Hengelo, Netherlands	31 May 2004

No new records were set during the competition.

== Qualification ==
The qualification period for athletics was 1 January 2003 to 9 August 2004. For the men's 5000 metres, each National Olympic Committee was permitted to enter up to three athletes that had run the race in 13:21.50 or faster during the qualification period. If an NOC had no athletes that qualified under that standard, one athlete that had run the race in 13:25.40 or faster could be entered.

== Schedule ==
All times are Eastern European Summer Time (UTC+3)

Date	Time	Round
Wednesday, 25 August 2004	19:50	Round 1
Saturday, 28 August 2004	21:05	Final

== Results ==
=== Round 1 ===
Qualification rule: The first five finishers in each heat (Q) plus the next five fastest overall runners (q) advanced to the final.

==== Heat 1 ====
Rank	Name	Nationality	Result	Notes
1	Kenenisa Bekele	Ethiopia	13:21.16	Q
2	Gebregziabher Gebremariam	Ethiopia	13:21.20	Q
3	Hicham El Guerrouj	Morocco	13:21.87	Q
4	Craig Mottram	Australia	13:21.88	Q
5	Abraham Chebii	Kenya	13:22.30	Q
6	Hicham Bellani	Morocco	13:22.64	q
7	Alistair Ian Cragg	Ireland	13:23.01	q
8	Samir Moussaoui	Algeria	13:24.98	q
9	Sultan Khamis Zaman	Qatar	13:26.52	
10	John Mayock	Great Britain	13:26.81	
11	Günther Weidlinger	Austria	13:29.32	
12	Christian Belz	Switzerland	13:29.59	
13	Alejandro Suárez	Mexico	13:35.32	
14	Jonathon Riley	United States	13:38.79	
15	Mohammed Abdelhak Zakaria	Bahrain	13:42.04	
16	Monder Rizki	Belgium	14:03.58	
17	Serhiy Lebid	Ukraine	14:10.23	
	Carlos García	Spain	DNF	

==== Heat 2 ====
Rank	Name	Nationality	Result	Notes
1	Ali Saidi Sief	Algeria	13:18.94	Q
2	Eliud Kipchoge	Kenya	13:19.01	Q
3	Dejene Berhanu	Ethiopia	13:19.42	Q
4	John Kibowen	Kenya	13:19.65	Q
5	Abderrahim Goumri	Morocco	13:20.03	Q
6	Tim Broe	United States	13:20.29	q
7	Zersenay Tadese	Eritrea	13:22.17	q
8	Samson Kiflemariam	Eritrea	13:26.97	
9	Roberto García	Spain	13:27.71	
10	Khoudir Aggoune	Algeria	13:29.37	
11	Fabiano Joseph Naasi	Tanzania	13:31.89	
12	Marius Bakken	Norway	13:36.38	
13	Freddy González	Venezuela	13:42.44	
14	Tom Compernolle	Belgium	13:43.44	
15	Mark Carroll	Ireland	13:46.81	
16	Carles Castillejo	Spain	13:49.16	
17	Michael Aish	New Zealand	13:50.00	
18	Rajendra Bahadur Bhandari	Nepal	14:04.89	NR

=== Final ===
Rank	Name	Nationality	Result	Notes
1st place, gold medalist(s)	Hicham El Guerrouj	Morocco	13:14.39	
2nd place, silver medalist(s)	Kenenisa Bekele	Ethiopia	13:14.59	
3rd place, bronze medalist(s)	Eliud Kipchoge	Kenya	13:15.10	
4	Gebregziabher Gebremariam	Ethiopia	13:15.35	
5	Dejene Berhanu	Ethiopia	13:16.92	
6	John Kibowen	Kenya	13:18.24	
7	Zersenay Tadese	Eritrea	13:24.31	
8	Craig Mottram	Australia	13:25.70	
9	Hicham Bellani	Morocco	13:31.81	
10	Ali Saidi Sief	Algeria	13:32.57	
11	Tim Broe	United States	13:33.06	
12	Alistair Ian Cragg	Ireland	13:43.06	
13	Abderrahim Goumri	Morocco	13:47.27	
14	Samir Moussaoui	Algeria	14:02.01	
	Abraham Chebii	Kenya	DNF	
