= Sentayehu Ejigu =

Ethiopian long-distance runner (born 1985)

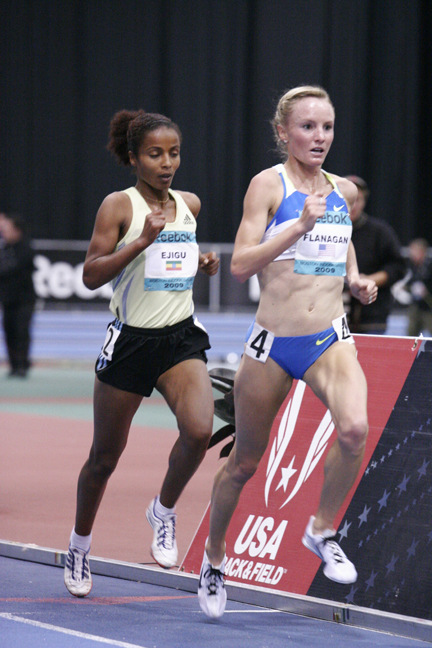
- Sentayehu Ejigu (on the left) at the 2009 Boston Indoor Games

Medal record

Women's athletics

Representing Ethiopia

World Indoor Championships
| Bronze medal – third place | 2010 Doha | 3000 m |

African Championships
| Bronze medal – third place | 2010 Nairobi | 5000 m |

Continental Cup
| Silver medal – second place | 2010 Split | 5000 m |

Sentayehu Ejigu Tamerat (born 21 June 1985 in Debre Markos, Amhara Region) is an Ethiopian long-distance runner, who specializes in the 3000 and 5000 metres. She represented Ethiopia at the 2004 Summer Olympics.

After narrowly missing out on medals at the 2006 IAAF World Indoor Championships and 2009 World Championships, she made her breakthrough in 2010, winning bronze medals at the African Championships in Athletics and World Indoors. She was the silver medallist at the 2010 IAAF Continental Cup.

She is the third fastest of all-time over 3000 m indoors with her best of 8:25.27 minutes. She also ranks among the top eight fastest women ever over 5000 m both outdoors and indoors.

== Career ==
As a child, her quick feet made her the natural messenger-girl for the family errands and she soon took up running at school. She began entering competitions and her immediate success led to a move to Addis Ababa to train with the Banks Running Club. Despite her talent, she often was runner-up to her club mate Meseret Defar – who went on to win Olympic gold in the 5000 metres.

Sentayehu made her international championship debut at the 2001 World Youth Championships in Athletics and took the bronze medal in the 1500 metres. She soon changed her focus to longer distances and competed on the 2002 IAAF Golden League circuit, recording a 3000 metres best of 8:48.30 minutes at the Weltklasse Zurich at the age of seventeen. She gained a place at the 2002 IAAF Grand Prix Final and came seventh in the event. A sixth-place finish in the junior race at the 2003 IAAF World Cross Country Championships helped the Ethiopian women to the team title, while fellow Ethiopian Tirunesh Dibaba won the race. She improved her 3000 m track best to 8:46.51 that year but an appearance at the 2003 IAAF World Athletics Final resulted in another seventh-place finish.

Her 2004 season was pivotal for her career: she reduced her 5000 m best significantly to 14:35.18 minutes and gained a spot on the Ethiopian Olympic team. At the 2004 Athens Olympics the nineteen-year-old came tenth in the women's 5000 m final. Despite her athletic breakthrough, that year also took its toll on her body as she acquired a long-term problem in her heel and calf which affected her running. She ran an indoor 3000 m personal best of 8:46.67 minutes at the 2005 Boston Indoor Games, but her outdoor season fizzled out as she did not qualify for the 2005 World Championships in Athletics. She again proved herself indoors the following year and came fourth at the 2006 IAAF World Indoor Championships, improving further to 8:43.38 minutes. Injuries continued to impair her consistency and the sudden death of her sister in October 2007 saw her put her career on hold. She married Berhanu Alemu, a fellow runner, and began to come back to full-time professional competition in 2009.

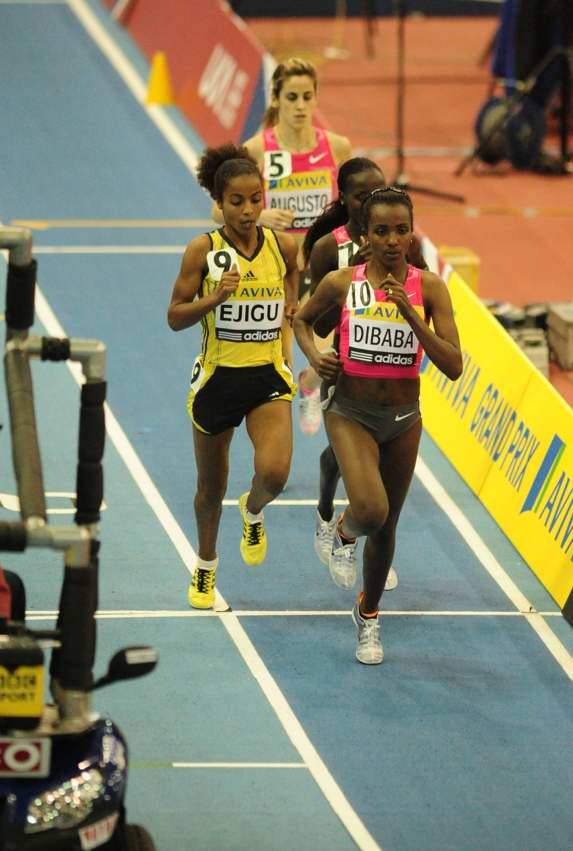
Sentayehu (left) taking on Tirunesh Dibaba at the 2010 Aviva Indoor Grand Prix.

She raised herself among the fastest ever over 5000 m indoors with a run at the 2009 Boston Indoor Games, just nipping ahead of Shalane Flanagan at the line to win in 14:47.62 minutes. She qualified for a full complement of competitions that season: she finished fourteenth in the women's race at the 2009 IAAF World Cross Country Championships, just missed a medal with a fourth place over 5000 m at the 2009 World Championships in Athletics, and closed her track season with an appearance at the 2009 IAAF World Athletics Final, coming sixth over 5000 m.

Sentayehu dramatically improved in 2010, putting her history of injury behind her. She improved her 5000 m indoor best to 14:46.80 minutes and set a mark of 9:12.68 for the two miles. At the 2010 IAAF World Indoor Championships she devised a plan with Meseret Defar to thwart the Kenyans in the 3000 m and the Ethiopians succeeded, with Meseret winning the title and Sentayehu taking the bronze – her first international senior medal.

Outdoors, she won her first meeting of the 2010 IAAF Diamond League at the Shanghai Golden Grand Prix. She improved her 5000 m time to 14:28.39 minutes at the Meeting Areva, recording the second fastest time of the year behind the winner Vivian Cheruiyot. She won the 3000 m at the Herculis meeting in Monaco with a time of 8:28.41 – the fastest by any athlete outdoors that season. She claimed her second major medal of the year at the 2010 African Championships in Athletics, bringing home the 5000 m bronze behind Cheruiyot and Meseret, and went on to close the year with a silver medal for Africa at the 2010 IAAF Continental Cup.

She opened her 2011 indoor season at the Aviva Indoor Grand Prix and improved her 3000 m best to 8:30.26 minutes, raising herself up to fourth on the all-time indoor lists. A road debut over 10 km followed later that month and she pipped Dire Tune at the line to take the World's Best 10K in Puerto Rico. She performed well on the 2013 IAAF Diamond League that year, finishing second at the Shanghai Diamond League, FBK Games, Bislett Games and Meeting Areva. In the 5000 m final at the 2011 World Championships in Athletics she finished just outside the medals with a fourth-place finish.

A leg injury ruled her out of 2012 and also much of 2013. A win at the Tufts Health Plan 10K for Women in a personal best 31:33 minutes in October 2013 seemed to indicate a return to form. She made her half marathon debut in Delhi that December, but her time of 1:12:02 hours left her out of the top ten in the high calibre race.

== Competition record ==
| Year | Competition | Venue | Position | Event | Notes |
|---|---|---|---|---|---|
| 2001 | World Youth Championships | Debrecen, Hungary | 3rd | 1500 m | 4:15.89 PB |
| 2003 | World Cross Country Championships | Lausanne, Switzerland | 6th | Junior race | |
| 2003 | World Athletics Final | Monte Carlo, Monaco | 7th | 5000 m | |
| 2004 | Olympic Games | Athens, Greece | 10th | 5000 m | |
| 2004 | World Athletics Final | Monte Carlo, Monaco | 5th | 3000 m | 8:42.63 PB |
| 2006 | World Indoor Championships | Moscow, Russia | 4th | 3000 m | |
| 2009 | World Championships | Berlin, Germany | 4th | 5000 m | |
| 2009 | World Athletics Final | Thessaloniki, Greece | 6th | 5000 m | |
| 2010 | World Indoor Championships | Doha, Qatar | 3rd | 3000 m | |
| 2010 | African Championships | Nairobi, Kenya | 3rd | 5000 m | |
| 2010 | Continental Cup | Split, Croatia | 2nd | 5000 m | |
| 2011 | World Championships | Daegu, South Korea | 4th | 5000 metres | |

== Personal bests ==
Outdoor

- 1500 metres – 4:15.89 min (2001)
- 3000 metres – 8:28.41 min (2010)
- 5000 metres – 14:28.39 min (2010)
- 10K run – 31:33 min (2013)
- Half marathon – 1:12:02 hrs (2013)

Indoor

- 3000 metres – 8:25.27 min (2010)
- Two miles – 9:12.68 min (2010)
- 5000 metres – 14:46.80 min (2010)
