= Tewodros Shiferaw =

Ethiopian steeplechase runner

Tewodros Shiferaw (born 21 September 1980) is an Ethiopian runner specialising in the 3000 metres steeplechase. Later in his career he focused more on road-running.

Tewodros competed at one Olympic Games and two World Championships each time failing to advance to the final. His steeplechase personal best is 8:22.22 from 2004.

== Competition record ==
Year	Competition	Venue	Position	Event	Notes
Representing Ethiopia
2003	World Championships	Paris, France	18th (h)	3000 m s'chase	8:23.41
2003	All-Africa Games	Abuja, Nigeria	3rd	3000 m s'chase	8:27.33
2003	Afro-Asian Games	Hyderabad, India	–	3000 m s'chase	DNF
2004	Olympic Games	Athens, Greece	27th (h)	3000 m s'chase	8:33.15
2005	World Championships	Helsinki, Finland	20th (h)	3000 m s'chase	8:27.06
