= Athletics at the 2003 All-Africa Games – Women's 10,000 metres =

The women's 10,000 metres at the 2003 All-Africa Games were held on October 14.

== Results ==
Rank	Name	Nationality	Time	Notes
1st place, gold medalist(s)	Ejegayehu Dibaba	Ethiopia	32:34.54	
2nd place, silver medalist(s)	Werknesh Kidane	Ethiopia	32:37.35	
3rd place, bronze medalist(s)	Leah Malot	Kenya	32:56.43	
4	Eyerusalem Kuma	Ethiopia	33:11.93	
5	Irene Kwambai	Kenya	33:27.03	
	Christiana Augustine	Nigeria	DNS	
