= Athletics at the 2003 All-Africa Games – Women's marathon =

The women's marathon at the 2003 All-Africa Games was held on October 16. This was the last time this event was contested at All-Africa Games as it was replaced with the half marathon from the next edition on.

== Results ==
Rank	Name	Nationality	Time	Notes
1st place, gold medalist(s)	Clarisse Rasoarizay	Madagascar	2:46:58	
2nd place, silver medalist(s)	Tadelech Birra	Ethiopia	2:52:04	
3rd place, bronze medalist(s)	Leila Aman	Ethiopia	2:55:07	
4	Epiphanie Nyirabarame	Rwanda	4:11.04	
	Abeba Tola	Ethiopia	DNF	
