= Luleseged Wale =

Ethiopian middle-distance runner

Personal information
- Nationality: Ethiopian
- Born: 29 May 1982 (age 44)

Sport
- Sport: Middle-distance running
- Event: Steeplechase

Luleseged Wale (born 29 May 1982) is an Ethiopian middle-distance runner. He competed in the men's 3000 metres steeplechase at the 2004 Summer Olympics.
