= Ejegayehu Dibaba =

Ethiopian long-distance runner (born 1982)

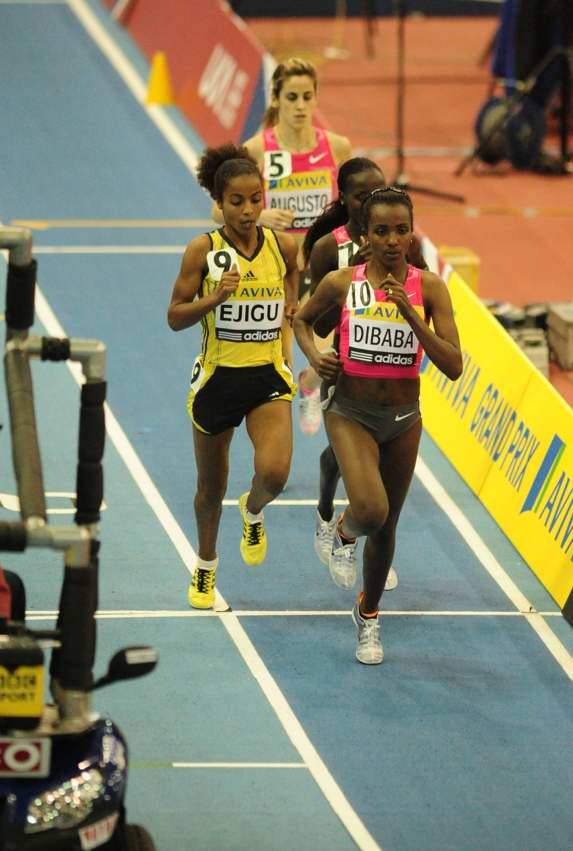

Personal information
- Native name: Ijigaayoo Dibaabaa
- Born: እጅጋዬሁ ዲባባ; 21 March 1982 (age 44) Bekoji, Arsi Province, Ethiopia
- Relatives: Tirunesh and Genzebe Dibaba (sisters), Derartu Tulu (cousin)

Sport
- Country: Ethiopia
- Sport: Athletics
- Event: Long-distance running
Medal record
Women's athletics
Representing Ethiopia
Olympic Games
Silver medal – second place	2004 Athens	10,000 m
World Championships
Bronze medal – third place	2005 Helsinki	5000 m
Bronze medal – third place	2005 Helsinki	10,000 m
Afro-Asian Games
Gold medal – first place	2003 Hyderabad	10,000 m
All-Africa Games
Gold medal – first place	2003 Abuja	10,000 m
African Championships
Silver medal – second place	2008 Addis Ababa	10,000 m
Bronze medal – third place	2002 Radès	5000 m
World Cross Country Championships
Silver medal – second place	2004 Brussels	Senior race

Ejegayehu Dibaba Keneni (Oromo: Ijigaayoo Dibaabaa; Amharic: እጅጋዬሁ ዲባባ, born 21 March 1982) is an Ethiopian long-distance runner. She won the silver medal in the 10,000 metres at the 2004 Athens Olympics. Ejegayehu earned bronze medals in the 5,000 metres and 10,000 metres events at the 2005 World Championships in Athletics. She took gold medals in the 10,000 m at the 2003 Afro-Asian Games and All-Africa Games.

Ejegayehu comes from a sporting family of several Olympic medalists, including her sisters Tirunesh and Genzebe, and her cousin Derartu Tulu.

== Early life ==
She was born in Chefe, Ethiopia.

== Career ==
Ejegayehu Dibaba is an Ethiopian long-distance runner from the high-altitude Arsi Zone of the Oromia Region. She is the third child of six. Her younger sisters Tirunesh and Genzebe are also international long-distance athletes, and brother Dejene is marked as a future star. Like her sister Tirunesh, her cousin Derartu Tulu is a double Olympic gold medallist (1992 and 2000).

Ejegayehu beat her cousin to take the silver medal in the 10,000 metres at the 2004 Summer Olympics, her two bronze medals at the IAAF World Championships in Athletics were behind her sister winning the gold in the final sprint.

She took part in a 7 km race at the Memorial Peppe Greco in September 2010 and took second place behind Sylvia Kibet.

Ejegayehu made her debut over the marathon distance at the 2011 Chicago Marathon and defeated Kayoko Fukushi by 2 minutes, 29 seconds in making her marathon debut at 2:22:09, the third fastest debut time and easy win. Ejegayehu Dibaba is 1.60 m tall and weighs 46 kg.

== International competitions ==
Representing Ethiopia
Year	Competition	Venue	Position	Event	Result
2002	African Championships	Radès, Tunisia	3rd	5000 m	15:56.02
2003	World Cross Country Championships	Lausanne, Switzerland	9th	Short race	12:59
2003	World Cross Country Championships	Lausanne, Switzerland	2nd	Team competition	24 pts
2003	World Championships	Paris, France	9th	10,000 m	31:01.07
2003	All-Africa Games	Abuja, Nigeria	1st	10,000 m	32:34.54
2003	Afro-Asian Games	Hyderabad, India	1st	10,000 m	33:01.12
2004	World Cross Country Championships	Lausanne, Switzerland	10th	Short race	13:23
2004	World Cross Country Championships	Lausanne, Switzerland	1st	Team competition	19 pts
2004	World Cross Country Championships	Lausanne, Switzerland	2nd	Long race	27:29
2004	World Cross Country Championships	Lausanne, Switzerland	1st	Team competition	26 pts
2004	Olympic Games	Athens, Greece	2nd	10,000 m	30:24.98
2004	World Athletics Final	Monte Carlo, Monaco	3rd	5000 m	14:59.52
2005	World Cross Country Championships	Saint-Étienne, France	14th	Short race	13:51
2005	World Championships	Helsinki, Finland	3rd	5000 m	14:42.47
2005	World Championships	Helsinki, Finland	3rd	10,000 m	30:26.00
2006	World Cross Country Championships	Fukuoka, Japan	14th	Long race	26:37
2006	African Championships	Bambous, Mauritius	–	10,000 m	DNF
2006	World Athletics Final	Stuttgart, Germany	4th	5000 m	16:07.87
2007	World Championships	Osaka, Japan	6th	10,000 m	32:30.44
2008	African Championships	Addis Ababa, Ethiopia	2nd	10,000 m	32:50.36
2008	Olympic Games	Beijing, China	12th	10,000 m	31:22.18
2008	World Athletics Final	Stuttgart, Germany	–	5000 m	DNS

== Personal bests ==
- 3000 metres - 8:35.94 (London 2006)
- 5000 metres - 14:32.74 (Bergen 2004)
- 10,000 metres - 30:18.39 (Sollentuna 2005)
- Half marathon - 1:16:40 (Tequila 2001)
- Marathon - 2:22:09 (Chicago, IL 2011)
