= Samuel Okon =

Nigerian footballer

Personal information
- Full name: Samuel Godwin Okon
- Date of birth: 15 December 1996 (age 29)
- Place of birth: Lagos, Nigeria
- Height: 1.85 m (6 ft 1 in)
- Position: Defender

Team information
- Current team: El-kanemi Warriors
- Number: 33

Youth career
- 2013–2015: Greater Tomorrow Academy

Senior career*
Years	Team	Apps	(Gls)
2015–2018	Akwa United		
2019	Dinamo Vranje	2	(0)
2019–	Bayelsa united		

International career^{‡}
	Nigeria U-17	7	(2)
2015	Nigeria U-20		
- * Club domestic league appearances and goals as of 11 July 2019 ‡ National team caps and goals as of 11 July 2019

Samuel Godwin Okon (born on 15 December 1996) is a Nigerian footballer who plays for Nigerian side El-kanemi Warriors. A left-back who can also play in center of the defense, he made his name when he became 2013 FIFA U-17 World Cup champion with Nigeria.

== Club career ==
Born in Lagos, Okon is a product of the Greater Tomorrow Academy where he plays until 2014. In 2015, having already made his name in Nigerian team that won the U-17 World Cup a year earlier, he joins Akwa United F.C., a side which was at that time growing in ambitions. He will play with the Promisse keepers a total of 4 seasons. Immediately upon his arrival, Akwa wins his first ever title, the 2015 Nigerian FA Cup. To give the title an even greater dimension, the Federation Cup achievement results in their continental qualification, and to crown it all up, Akwa inaugurates its new home stadium. However, enthusiasm wasn't enough to succeed in their continental debut at the 2016 CAF Confederation Cup, their inexperience made them unable to overcome the first stage, however, that made the club focus domestically, where their investment paid off surprisingly well, making them conquer their first Nigeria Super Cup, and further winning the Nigerian Super Four. Next season marked the 7th consecutive season of Akwa in Nigerian top-flight, giving the club, and subsequently Okon and other key players, becoming regular members of Nigerian league elite. Akwa won their second FA Cup, and finished 6th in 2017 Nigeria Professional Football League thus making a new qualification for continental championships. This time, despite making them go through a series of dramatic qualifiers, they managed to get to the third round, the last before the group stage, and, as characteristic for the Promise keepers, a dramatic round was played, only that this time, Sudanese Al-Hilal went through on away goals advantage, leaving Akwa out of continental competitions. However, just as it had happened 2 seasons ago, disappointment on continental level made the team seek revenge at national competitions, and that resulted in Akwa show-off domestically, finishing 2018 Nigeria Professional Football League with their best result ever, 2nd place just 2 points behind champions Lobi Stars F.C. Somuel Godwin Okon takes part of a highly intense half-a-decade period in which a recently promoted Nigerian top-flight club far from the spot-lights, becomes a real title contender and a force to be seriously considered.

It is in this environment that Okon considers his period at the club may have ended and tries new challenges. In the winter-break of the 2018–19 Serbian SuperLiga, Okon makes his move to Europe by signing with Serbian top-flight side FK Dinamo Vranje. At same transfer-window he is joined by another African, Senegalese Seydou Bocar Seck. Dinamo Vranje was relegated at the end of the season, and Okon left the club having made 2 appearances in the 2018–19 Serbian SuperLiga.

== International career ==
Okon was the captain of the Nigerian team that won gold in style at the 2013 FIFA U-17 World Cup. Undefeated, and with a scoring difference of 26:5, Okon was undisputed starter, having played all minutes of all 7 games in the tournament, and even scored on two occasions.

Okon was then part of the Nigeria national under-20 football team that won the 2015 African U-20 Championship. The tournament qualified automatically Nigeria for the 2015 FIFA U-20 World Cup being played later that year, however, Okon was among the players left out compared to the players that won the African title months earlier.

== Honours ==
=== Club ===
Akwa United

- Nigerian FA Cup: 2015, 2017
- Nigeria Super Cup: 2016
- Nigerian Super Four: 2016

=== National team ===
Nigeria U-17

- FIFA U-17 World Cup: 2013

Nigeria U-20

- African U-20 Championship: 2015
