= Athletics at the 2004 Summer Olympics =

Athletics at the Games of the XXVIII Olympiad
- Venue: Athens Olympic Stadium (track and field); Panathenaic Stadium (marathon); Streets of Athens (walk); Stadium at Olympia (shot put)
- Dates: 18–29 August 2004
- Competitors: from 197 nations

At the 2004 Summer Olympics, the athletics events were held at the Athens Olympic Stadium from August 18 to August 29, except for the marathons (run from Marathonas to the Kallimarmaro Stadium), the race walks (on the streets of Athens), and the shot put (held at the Ancient Olympia Stadium). A total of 46 events were contested, of which 24 by male and 22 by female athletes.

== Competition schedule ==
Legend
P	Preliminary round	Q	Qualification	H	Heats	½	Semi-finals	F	Final

Schedule
Men's
Date	18 Aug		20 Aug		21 Aug			22 Aug		23 Aug		24 Aug		25 Aug	26 Aug	27 Aug		28 Aug	29 Aug
Event	M	E	M	E	M	E		E		M	E	M	E	E	E	M	E	E	E
100 m					H	¼		½	F										
200 m												H	¼	½	F				
400 m				H		½					F								
800 m														H	½			F	
1500 m				H				½					F						
5000 m														H				F	
10,000 m				F															
110 m hurdles												H		¼	½		F		
400 m hurdles											H		½		F				
3000 m steeplechase						H							F						
4 × 100 m relay																	H	F	
4 × 400 m relay																	H	F	
Marathon																			F
20 km walk			F																
50 km walk																F			
High jump				Q				F											
Pole vault														Q			F		
Long jump													Q		F				
Triple jump			Q					F											
Shot put	Q	F																	
Discus throw					Q						F								
Hammer throw			Q					F											
Javelin throw															Q			F	
Decathlon										F									
Women's
Date	18 Aug		20 Aug		21 Aug			22 Aug		23 Aug		24 Aug		25 Aug	26 Aug	27 Aug		28 Aug	29 Aug
Event	M	E	M	E	M	E		E		M	E	M	E	E	E	M	E	E	E
100 m			H	¼		½	F												
200 m										H	¼		½	F					
400 m					H			½					F						
800 m				H		½					F								
1500 m													H		½			F	
5000 m				H							F								
10,000 m																	F		
100 m hurdles								H			½		F						
400 m hurdles					H			½						F					
4 × 100 m relay															H		F		
4 × 400 m relay																	H	F	
Marathon								F											
20 km walk										F									
High jump															Q			F	
Pole vault						Q							F						
Long jump														Q			F		
Triple jump						Q					F								
Shot put	Q	F																	
Discus throw				Q		F													
Hammer throw										Q				F					
Javelin throw														Q			F		
Heptathlon			F																

== Medal table ==
Rank	Nation	Gold	Silver	Bronze	Total
1	United States	9	11	5	25
2	Russia	6	7	6	19
3	Great Britain	3	0	1	4
4	Sweden	3	0	0	3
5	Ethiopia	2	3	2	7
6	Greece	2	2	1	5
7	Cuba	2	1	2	5
7	Jamaica	2	1	2	5
9	Morocco	2	1	0	3
10	Italy	2	0	1	3
11	China	2	0	0	2
11	Japan	2	0	0	2
13	Kenya	1	4	2	7
14	Lithuania	1	1	0	2
15	Czech Republic	1	0	2	3
16	Bahamas	1	0	1	2
16	Poland	1	0	1	2
18	Belarus	1	0	0	1
18	Cameroon	1	0	0	1
18	Dominican Republic	1	0	0	1
18	Norway	1	0	0	1
22	Romania	0	2	1	3
23	Germany	0	2	0	2
23	South Africa	0	2	0	2
25	Australia	0	1	2	3
25	Spain	0	1	2	3
25	Ukraine	0	1	2	3
28	Denmark	0	1	1	2
28	Portugal	0	1	1	2
30	Hungary	0	1	0	1
30	Latvia	0	1	0	1
30	Mexico	0	1	0	1
33	France	0	0	2	2
33	Nigeria	0	0	2	2
35	Brazil	0	0	1	1
35	Eritrea	0	0	1	1
35	Estonia	0	0	1	1
35	Kazakhstan	0	0	1	1
35	Slovenia	0	0	1	1
Totals (39 entries)		46	45	44	135

== Medal winners ==
=== Men ===
Event	Gold		Silver		Bronze	
100 metres	Justin Gatlin; United States	9.85	Francis Obikwelu; Portugal	9.86 (AR)	Maurice Greene; United States	9.87
200 metres	Shawn Crawford; United States	19.79	Bernard Williams; United States	20.01	Justin Gatlin; United States	20.03
400 metres	Jeremy Wariner; United States	44.00	Otis Harris; United States	44.16	Derrick Brew; United States	44.42
800 metres	Yuriy Borzakovskiy; Russia	1:44.45	Mbulaeni Mulaudzi; South Africa	1:44.61	Wilson Kipketer; Denmark	1:44.65
1500 metres	Hicham El Guerrouj; Morocco	3:34.18	Bernard Lagat; Kenya	3:34.30	Rui Silva; Portugal	3:34.68
5000 metres	Hicham El Guerrouj; Morocco	13:14.39	Kenenisa Bekele; Ethiopia	13:14.59	Eliud Kipchoge; Kenya	13:15.10
10,000 metres	Kenenisa Bekele; Ethiopia	27:05.10 (OR)	Sileshi Sihine; Ethiopia	27:09.39	Zersenay Tadese; Eritrea	27:22.57
110 metres hurdles	Liu Xiang; China	12.91 (WR)	Terrence Trammell; United States	13.18	Anier García; Cuba	13.20
400 metres hurdles	Félix Sánchez; Dominican Republic	47.63	Danny McFarlane; Jamaica	48.11	Naman Keïta; France	48.26
3000 metres steeplechase	Ezekiel Kemboi; Kenya	8:05.81	Brimin Kipruto; Kenya	8:06.11	Paul Kipsiele Koech; Kenya	8:06.64
4 × 100 metres relay	Great Britain; Jason Gardener; Darren Campbell; Marlon Devonish; Mark Lewis-Francis	38.07	United States; Shawn Crawford; Justin Gatlin; Coby Miller; Maurice Greene; Darvis Patton*	38.08	Nigeria; Olusoji Fasuba; Uchenna Emedolu; Aaron Egbele; Deji Aliu	38.23
4 × 400 metres relay	United States; Otis Harris; Derrick Brew; Jeremy Wariner; Darold Williamson; Andrew Rock*; Kelly Willie*	2:55.91	Australia; John Steffensen; Mark Ormrod; Patrick Dwyer; Clinton Hill	3:00.60	Nigeria; James Godday; Musa Audu; Saul Weigopwa; Enefiok Udo-Obong	3:00.90
Marathon	Stefano Baldini; Italy	2:10:55	Mebrahtom Keflezighi; United States	2:11:29	Vanderlei de Lima; Brazil	2:12:11
20 kilometres walk	Ivano Brugnetti; Italy	1:19:40	Paquillo Fernández; Spain	1:19:45	Nathan Deakes; Australia	1:20:02
50 kilometres walk	Robert Korzeniowski; Poland	3:38:46	Denis Nizhegorodov; Russia	3:42:50	Aleksey Voyevodin; Russia	3:43:34
High jump	Stefan Holm; Sweden	2.36 m	Matt Hemingway; United States	2.34 m	Jaroslav Bába; Czech Republic	2.34 m
Pole vault	Timothy Mack; United States	5.95 m (OR)	Toby Stevenson; United States	5.90 m	Giuseppe Gibilisco; Italy	5.85 m
Long jump	Dwight Phillips; United States	8.59 m	John Moffitt; United States	8.47 m	Joan Lino Martínez; Spain	8.32 m
Triple jump	Christian Olsson; Sweden	17.79 m	Marian Oprea; Romania	17.55 m	Danil Burkenya; Russia	17.48 m
Shot put^{[a]}	Adam Nelson; United States	21.16 m	Joachim Olsen; Denmark	21.07 m	Manuel Martínez; Spain	20.84 m
Shot put^{[a]}	Yuriy Bilonoh; Ukraine	21.16 m	Joachim Olsen; Denmark	21.07 m	Manuel Martínez; Spain	20.84 m
Discus throw	Virgilijus Alekna; Lithuania	69.89 m (OR)	Zoltán Kővágó; Hungary	67.04 m	Aleksander Tammert; Estonia	66.66 m
Discus throw	Róbert Fazekas; Hungary	70.93 m (OR)	Zoltán Kővágó; Hungary	67.04 m	Aleksander Tammert; Estonia	66.66 m
Hammer throw^{[b]}	Koji Murofushi; Japan	82.91 m	None Awarded ^{[b]}		None Awarded ^{[b]}	
Hammer throw^{[b]}	Adrian Annus; Hungary	83.19 m	None Awarded ^{[b]}		Ivan Tsikhan; Belarus	79.81 m
Javelin throw	Andreas Thorkildsen; Norway	86.50 m	Vadims Vasiļevskis; Latvia	84.95 m	Sergey Makarov; Russia	84.84 m
Decathlon	Roman Šebrle; Czech Republic	8893 pts (OR)	Bryan Clay; United States	8820 pts	Dmitriy Karpov; Kazakhstan	8725 pts

* Athletes who participated in the heats only and received medals.

=== Women ===
Event	Gold		Silver		Bronze	
100 metres	Yulia Nesterenko; Belarus	10.93	Lauryn Williams; United States	10.96	Veronica Campbell; Jamaica	10.97
200 metres	Veronica Campbell; Jamaica	22.05	Allyson Felix; United States	22.18	Debbie Ferguson-McKenzie; Bahamas	22.30
400 metres	Tonique Williams-Darling; Bahamas	49.41	Ana Guevara; Mexico	49.56	Natalya Antyukh; Russia	49.89
800 metres	Kelly Holmes; Great Britain	1:56.38	Hasna Benhassi; Morocco	1:56.43	Jolanda Čeplak; Slovenia	1:56.43
1500 metres	Kelly Holmes; Great Britain	3:57.90	Tatyana Tomashova; Russia	3:58.12	Maria Cioncan; Romania	3:58.39
5000 metres	Meseret Defar; Ethiopia	14:45.65	Isabella Ochichi; Kenya	14:48.19	Tirunesh Dibaba; Ethiopia	14:51.83
10,000 metres	Xing Huina; China	30:24.36	Ejegayehu Dibaba; Ethiopia	30:24.98	Derartu Tulu; Ethiopia	30:26.42
100 metres hurdles	Joanna Hayes; United States	12.37 (OR)	Olena Krasovska; Ukraine	12.45	Melissa Morrison; United States	12.56
400 metres hurdles	Fani Chalkia; Greece	52.82	Ionela Târlea-Manolache; Romania	53.38	Tetyana Tereshchuk-Antipova; Ukraine	53.44
4 × 100 metres relay	Jamaica; Tayna Lawrence; Sherone Simpson; Aleen Bailey; Veronica Campbell; Beverly McDonald*	41.73	Russia; Olga Fyodorova; Yuliya Tabakova; Irina Khabarova; Larisa Kruglova	42.27	France; Véronique Mang; Muriel Hurtis; Sylviane Félix; Christine Arron	42.54
4 × 400 metres relay^{[c]}	United States; DeeDee Trotter; Monique Henderson; Sanya Richards; Monique Hennagan; Moushaumi Robinson*	3:19.01 ^{[c]}	Russia; Olesya Krasnomovets; Natalya Nazarova; Olesya Zykina; Natalya Antyukh; Tatyana Firova*; Natalya Ivanova*	3:20.16	Jamaica; Novlene Williams; Michelle Burgher; Nadia Davy; Sandie Richards; Ronetta Smith*	3:22.00
Marathon	Mizuki Noguchi; Japan	2:26:20	Catherine Ndereba; Kenya	2:26:32	Deena Kastor; United States	2:27:20
20 kilometres walk	Athanasia Tsoumeleka; Greece	1:29:12	Olimpiada Ivanova; Russia	1:29:16	Jane Saville; Australia	1:29:25
High jump	Yelena Slesarenko; Russia	2.06 m (OR)	Hestrie Cloete; South Africa	2.02 m	Viktoriya Styopina; Ukraine	2.02 m
Pole vault	Yelena Isinbayeva; Russia	4.91 m (WR)	Svetlana Feofanova; Russia	4.75 m	Anna Rogowska; Poland	4.70 m
Long jump	Tatyana Lebedeva; Russia	7.07 m	Irina Simagina; Russia	7.05 m	Tatyana Kotova; Russia	7.05 m
Triple jump	Françoise Mbango Etone; Cameroon	15.30 m	Hrysopiyi Devetzi; Greece	15.25 m	Tatyana Lebedeva; Russia	15.14 m
Shot put^{[d]}	Yumileidi Cumbá; Cuba	19.59 m	Nadine Kleinert; Germany	19.55 m	None Awarded ^{[d]}	
Shot put^{[d]}	Irina Korzhanenko; Russia	21.06 m	Nadine Kleinert; Germany	19.55 m	None Awarded ^{[d]}	
Discus throw^{[e]}	Natalya Sadova; Russia	67.02 m	Anastasia Kelesidou; Greece	66.68 m	Věra Pospíšilová-Cechlová; Czech Republic	66.08 m
Discus throw^{[e]}	Natalya Sadova; Russia	67.02 m	Anastasia Kelesidou; Greece	66.68 m	Iryna Yatchenko; Belarus	66.17 m
Hammer throw	Olga Kuzenkova; Russia	75.02 m (OR)	Yipsi Moreno; Cuba	73.36 m	Yunaika Crawford; Cuba	73.16 m
Javelin throw	Osleidys Menéndez; Cuba	71.53 m (OR)	Steffi Nerius; Germany	65.82 m	Mirela Manjani; Greece	64.29 m
Heptathlon	Carolina Klüft; Sweden	6952 pts	Austra Skujytė; Lithuania	6435 pts	Kelly Sotherton; Great Britain	6424 pts

* Athletes who participated in the heats only and received medals.

== Participating nations ==
A total of 197 nations participated in the different Athletics events at the 2004 Summer Olympics.

- Afghanistan (2 athletes)
- Albania (2)
- Algeria (21)
- American Samoa (2)
- Andorra (2)
- Angola (2)
- Antigua and Barbuda (3)
- Argentina (9)
- Armenia (2)
- Aruba (1)
- Australia (45)
- Austria (6)
- Azerbaijan (5)
- Bahamas (18)
- Bahrain (6)
- Bangladesh (1)
- Barbados (3)
- Belarus (43)
- Belgium (18)
- Belize (2)
- Benin (2)
- Bermuda (1)
- Bolivia (2)
- Bosnia and Herzegovina (2)
- Botswana (9)
- Brazil (37)
- British Virgin Islands (1)
- Brunei (1)
- Bulgaria (20)
- Burkina Faso (3)
- Burundi (6)
- Cambodia (2)
- Cameroon (8)
- Canada (23)
- Cape Verde (1)
- Cayman Islands (2)
- Central African Republic (2)
- Chad (2)
- Chile (3)
- China (52)
- Chinese Taipei (2)
- Colombia (13)
- Comoros (2)
- Republic of the Congo (2)
- Cook Islands (2)
- Ivory Coast (2)
- Croatia (12)
- Cuba (39)
- Cyprus (7)
- Czech Republic (36)
- Denmark (5)
- Democratic Republic of the Congo (2)
- Djibouti (2)
- Dominica (2)
- Dominican Republic (6)
- Ecuador (8)
- Egypt (2)
- El Salvador (2)
- Equatorial Guinea (2)
- Eritrea (4)
- Estonia (15)
- Ethiopia (25)
- Fiji (2)
- Finland (30)
- France (61)
- Gabon (2)
- The Gambia (2)
- Georgia (3)
- Germany (86)
- Ghana (11)
- Great Britain (58)
- Greece (66)
- Grenada (3)
- Guam (2)
- Guatemala (6)
- Guinea (2)
- Guinea-Bissau (2)
- Guyana (2)
- Haiti (4)
- Honduras (1)
- Hong Kong (2)
- Hungary (39)
- Iceland (2)
- India (19)
- Indonesia (2)
- Iran (2)
- Iraq (2)
- Ireland (15)
- Israel (5)
- Italy (54)
- Jamaica (45)
- Japan (41)
- Jordan (2)
- Kazakhstan (22)
- Kenya (32)
- Kiribati (2)
- Kuwait (5)
- Kyrgyzstan (7)
- Laos (2)
- Latvia (17)
- Lebanon (2)
- Lesotho (2)
- Liberia (2)
- Libya (2)
- Lithuania (59)
- Luxembourg (1)
- Macedonia (2)
- Madagascar (3)
- Malaysia (2)
- Malawi (2)
- Maldives (2)
- Mali (2)
- Malta (2)
- Mauritania (2)
- Mauritius (4)
- Mexico (27)
- Federated States of Micronesia (2)
- Moldova (13)
- Monaco (1)
- Mongolia (2)
- Morocco (27)
- Mozambique (2)
- Namibia (3)
- Nepal (2)
- Netherlands (25)
- Netherlands Antilles (2)
- Nicaragua (3)
- Niger (2)
- Nigeria (26)
- New Zealand (15)
- North Korea (4)
- Norway (10)
- Oman (1)
- Pakistan (2)
- Palau (2)
- Palestine (2)
- Panama (2)
- Papua New Guinea (2)
- Paraguay (2)
- Peru (2)
- Philippines (2)
- Poland (55)
- Portugal (32)
- Puerto Rico (3)
- Qatar (14)
- Romania (28)
- Russia (130)
- Rwanda (3)
- Saint Kitts and Nevis (2)
- Saint Lucia (1)
- Saint Vincent and the Grenadines (2)
- Samoa (2)
- San Marino (1)
- São Tomé and Príncipe (2)
- Saudi Arabia (12)
- Senegal (10)
- Serbia and Montenegro (7)
- Seychelles (2)
- Sierra Leone (2)
- Singapore (2)
- Slovakia (12)
- Slovenia (18)
- Solomon Islands (2)
- Somalia (2)
- South Africa (38)
- South Korea (18)
- Spain (71)
- Sri Lanka (5)
- Sudan (5)
- Suriname (2)
- Swaziland (2)
- Sweden (15)
- Switzerland (10)
- Syria (2)
- Tanzania (8)
- Tajikistan (2)
- Thailand (3)
- Timor-Leste (2)
- Trinidad and Tobago (21)
- Togo (2)
- Tonga (2)
- Tunisia (6)
- Turkey (13)
- Turkmenistan (2)
- Uganda (4)
- Ukraine (54)
- United Arab Emirates (1)
- United States (140)
- Uruguay (3)
- Uzbekistan (11)
- Vanuatu (2)
- Venezuela (5)
- Vietnam (2)
- Virgin Islands (2)
- Yemen (1)
- Zambia (2)
- Zimbabwe (6)

== Notes ==
^{a} After the announcement of the disqualification for doping of the athlete Yuri Bilonog (UKR), who won the gold medal at the time, there was a new distribution of medals in March 2013. The IOC upgraded original silver medalist Adam Nelson (USA) to gold, bronze medalist Joachim Olsen (DEN) to silver, and fourth place finisher Manuel Martínez (ESP) to bronze.
^{b} Adrian Annus (HUN) and Ivan Tsikhan (BLR) were disqualified due to doping. IOC decided to declare the silver and bronze medals vacant.
^{c} Crystal Cox (USA), who ran in the preliminary round of a relay team, admitted to using anabolic steroids from 2001 to 2004. The IOC decided to revoke the gold medal from Crystal Cox and asked the IAAF to make its decision about the US squad. The IOC and IAAF announced that the result would stand because, according to the rules of the time, a team should not be disqualified because of a doping offense by an athlete who did not compete in finals.
^{d} Russian athlete Irina Korzhanenko lost her gold medal in women's shot put due to doping, with Cuban Yumileidi Cumbá Jay replacing her as the Olympic champion, German Nadine Kleinert receiving the silver medal, and Svetlana Krivelyova of Russia receiving the bronze medal, however Krivelyova was later stripped of her bronze for the same reason. IOC decided to declare the bronze medal vacant.
^{e} Iryna Yatchenko (BLR), was disqualified due to doping. The IOC decided that the bronze medal was reallocated to the athlete Věra Pospíšilová-Cechlová (CZE) during the IOC Executive Board on 30 May 2013.
