= Shuttle hurdle relay =

Track athletics event

The shuttle hurdle relay (SHR) is a type of a relay race in track and field in which participants jump (sprint) over hurdles. The shuttle hurdle relay is contested at the Drake Relays, Desert Conference Relays, Kansas Relays, Mt. SAC Relays, Penn Relays, Texas Relays, Akron Relays, Alabama Relay, Appalachian Conference Relay, Florida Relays (Gainesville), Knoxville Relay, Long Beach Relay, Ohio Relays, Santa Barbara Relay, So Cal Relays (at College of the Desert), Tennessee Relays (formerly: Dogwood Relays, Sea Ray Relays), Towson Relays, and Tri-State Relays. The SHR was also included at the 2019 IAAF World Relays and 2021 competition. In 2024 it was included at the Croatian Relay Championships.

== Variations ==
=== High Hurdle Relay ===
The SHR is currently referred to as the 4 × 60 hurdles, 4 × 80 hurdles, 4 × 100 hurdles, and 4 × 110 hurdles. In the past the term shuttle hurdle relay was more commonly used.

This events allow four hurdlers to run on the same relay team and has been held both outdoor and indoor. In a shuttle hurdle relay, each of four hurdlers on a team runs the opposite direction from the preceding runner.

The shuttle hurdle relay typically consists of: (a) four hurdlers per relay team – each runs one leg, (b) same sex, (c) each hurdler runs the same hurdle spacing and hurdle heights, (d) two lanes – one up, and one back (e) the first leg starts at the automatic timing line, hence this allows the anchor leg to finish at the "finish line", (f) hurdlers must stay in their own lane, (g) hurdlers are not allowed to touch the hurdles with their hands, (h) depending on the age-group there may be an "exchange zone" (Masters Track and Field does not use an exchange zone), (i) No batons are used for this particular relay, and (j) For Masters Track and Field the youngest person on the relay team dictates the age-bracket (for that particular relay team).

USATF Competition Rules list description for the Open and Masters shuttle hurdle relay competition.

=== Mile intermediate hurdle relay ===
In the past, a rarely run 4 × 440 yard shuttle hurdle relay was included at some competitions. A height of 36" tall hurdles was used.

On 29 April 1972, Olivett College (John McGlashen, Charles VanderRoest, Bruce Ritter, and Ron Hobday) beat Cedarville in 3:58.4 for the mile intermediate hurdle at the Tri-State Relays, held at Defiance College. In April 1973, Edinboro State at the Akron Invitational Relays in Akron, Ohio broke the world best for this event. On 6 April 1974, Occidental College broke the 1973 record in the 4 × 440 yard shuttle hurdle relay in a meet against Whittier College and Pomona-Pitzer. On 17 April 1974, Stanford broke Occidental College's record while defeating Skyline College. March 15, 1975 Occidental College took the record back. On 24 April 1976, Mt Sac College broke the record at the Mt. SAC Relays, and on 23 April 1977, Pasadena broke the record at the Mt. SAC Relays. By 1984, Long Beach City College (Jose Davis, Tyrone McCullough, Nelson Rodríguez, and Oswaldo Zea) held the community college 1600 meter intermediate hurdle relay in 3:31.06.

== History ==
The first recorded instance of a shuttle hurdle relay was probably in January 1901, when a "Hurdle relay race" was included at a meet in Portland, Oregon. No hurdle details were provided. In December 1906, a "hurdle relay race proved a highly exciting contest" at a meet in Vancouver, Canada. No hurdle details were provided. In January 1907 and November 1907, the YMCA in Kansas held an indoor "hurdle relay".

In 1910–1911, the Official Handbook of the Girls' Branch of the Public Schools Athletic League states for the girls hurdle relay "the maximum distance for each runner not to exceed fifty yards; the maximum height for hurdles to be two feet". On 11 June 1910, a girls hurdle relay was held at the Armory in Rochester, New York. A November 1912 announcement for girls in New York announced that youth activities would include a "hurdle relay". In 1912, the American Physical Review magazine reports a boys SHR at a Dual Athletic Meet between Cambridge High and Latin School vs Rindge Technical School. In 1916, an indoor meet in Hawaii held a "300-yard hurdle relay race", which was won by the N.A.C. Club for the youth clubs, and Kalihi for the junior clubs.

In May 1917, at the first annual girls' interscholastic meet on Tech Field in Pennsylvania, a "Hurdle relay" was competed, with Allegheny first, Peabody second, and Latimer third. No hurdle details were provided.

In 1926, the SHR was added to the Penn Relays events at the suggestion of David Burghley, the British champion of the 400 meter hurdles at the 1928 Olympic Games.

In April 1938, Oklahoma State set a (then) Kansas Relays meet record in 1:01.6. In March 1953, in California, the SHR was included at the Orange Show Relay and the four-way spike meet (four colleges).

In 1973, a West German team placed 3rd at the Mt Sac Relays in 59.1.

Masters Track and Field have included the SHR as a standard event at the USATF Masters Outdoor Championships. The competition is eligible for Masters American Records and medals. The oldest athlete that has competed in a SHR is George Roudebush (age 93) when he competed in a 2018 M80 plus SHR race.

The oldest female athletes that have competed in a SHR are Tami Graf (age 85) at the 2021 and Flo Meiler (age 88) at the 2022 USATF Masters Outdoor Championships.

The SMR was also included at former relays such as the California Relays, Compton Relays, West Coast Relays, the 1996 Alabama Relays, and the Golden Valley Conference Relays Additional relays include the 1993 European Relays in Portsmouth, England, and July 5, 1981, TAC Relay Championship in Greenvale, New York.

Including a SHR outside of the US and the United Kingdom has been infrequent. In August 2007, the BAUHAUS-galan (formerly GN Galan) meet in Stockholm, Sweden included the 480 Yard Shuttle Hurdle Relay. The United States won with a time of 53.36 seconds, Sweden in second with a time of 57.03, Finland in third with a time of 57.26. The event was well received.

The 1990 Penn Relay included a 880 shuttle hurdle relay.

=== The British Empire versus the USA ===
In 1920-1928, after the 1920, 1924, and 1928 Summer Olympics, the majority of the American track and field team crossed the British Channel to compete in a highly-publicized meet known as "The British Empire versus the U.S.A.", held at Stamford Bridge, London. This meet included the shuttle hurdle relay. In 1924 and 1928, the US won in 61.6 and 62 seconds for the 480 yards hurdle relay, respectively.

=== Oxford versus Cambridge ===
The Oxford–Cambridge rivalry: Oxford versus Cambridge Inter-University competitions included 480 yards hurdles relay (1920 to 1930) and 880 yards low hurdles relay (1926 to 1930).

1920: Inter-varsity: Cambridge versus Oxford: Dec 1920: Oxford beat Cambridge in the SHR. Winning time of 67 2/5 seconds. December 1921 Oxford beat Cambridge in 69 4/5 seconds. December 1922 Oxford beat Cambridge in 67 2/5 seconds.

== All-time top 20 ==
=== Men – 4 × 110 m ===
Updated November 2020

Rank	Time	Team	Nationality	Date	Place	Ref.
1	52.94	Jason Richardson; Aleec Harris; Aries Merritt; David Oliver	United States	25 April 2015	Des Moines	
2	53.08	Andrew Riley; Ryan Braithwaite; Hansle Parchment; Greggmar Swift	Jamaica; Barbados; Jamaica; Barbados	25 April 2015	Des Moines	
3	53.36	USA; Ron Bramlett; Anwar Moore; David Payne; Aries Merritt	United States	7 August 2007	Stockholm	
4	53.44y	USA Red; David Oliver; Joel Brown; Aubrey Herring; Aries Merritt	United States	25 April 2008	Philadelphia	
5	53.62	ACC All Stars; Allen Johnson; Steve Brown; Terry Reese; Duane Ross	United States; Trinidad and Tobago; United States; United States	16 May 1998	Clemson	
6	53.62	Ronnie Ash; Ryan Wilson; Spencer Adams; Jeff Porter	United States	25 April 2015	Des Moines	
7	53.65	World Express; Eddie Lovett; Spencer Adams; Jarret Eaton; Mikel Thomas	United States Virgin Islands; United States; United States; Trinidad and Tobago	4 April 2015	Gainesville	
8	53.77	Jeff Porter; Dominic Berger; Aries Merritt; Ty Akins	United States; United States; United States; Nigeria	26 April 2014	Des Moines	
9	53.83	Jamaica; Andrew Riley; Deuce Carter; Hansle Parchment; Stefan Fennell	Jamaica	26 April 2014	Des Moines	
10	53.88	Karamu Flyers; Jack Pierce; Tony Dees; Eric Reid; Keith Talley	United States	1 April 1989	Tempe	
11	53.93	Karamu Flyers; Jack Pierce; Eric Reid; Tony Dees; Keith Talley	United States	7 May 1989	Modesto	
12	54.07y	South Carolina; Corey Taylor; Fred Townsend; Charles Ryan; Kenneth Ferguson	United States	25 April 2003	Philadelphia	
13	54.10	Elite 2008; David Oliver; Aubrey Herring; Joel Brown; John McDowell	United States	5 April 2008	Gainesville	
14	54.20	USC Alumni; Sam Turner; Philip Johnson; Milan Stewart; Tonie Campbell	United States	25 April 1982	Walnut	
15	54.23	Star Athletics; Ryan Braithwaite; Selim Nurudeen; Roudy Monrose; Kemar Hyman	Barbados; Nigeria; Haiti; Cayman Islands	6 April 2013	Gainesville	
16	54.30	Star Athletics		7 April 2012	Gainesville	
17	54.35y	East Coast All-Stars; Courtney Hawkins; Glenn Terry; Allen Johnson; Jack Pierce	United States	28 April 1995	Philadelphia	
18	54.36	Brooks Beast; David Oliver ? Thomas; Ryan Wilson; Jeff Porter	United States United States; United States	6 April 2013	Gainesville	
19	54.40	Tennessee; Jerome Wilson; Anthony Hancock; Reggie Towns; Willie Gault	United States	22 May 1981	Knoxville	
20	54.41	Philadelphia Pioneers; Wayne Mason; Dan Oliver; Kerry Bethel; Charles Foster	United States	22 May 1981	Knoxville	

y = adjusted from the slightly shorter distance of 4 × 120 yards by adding 0.13 seconds

=== Women – 4 × 100 m ===
Rank	Time	Team	Nationality	Date	Place	Ref.
1	50.50	USA Blue; Brianna Rollins; Dawn Harper-Nelson; Queen Harrison; Kristi Castlin	United States	24 April 2015	Des Moines	
2	50.50	All Stars White; Tiffany Porter; Jasmin Stowers; Jacquelyn Coward; Sharika Nelvis	Great Britain; United States; United States; United States	24 April 2015	Des Moines	
3	50.66	BJPTC; Kristi Castlin; Brianna Rollins; Queen Harrison; Tiffany Porter	United States; United States; United States; Great Britain	5 April 2014	Gainesville	
4	50.78	BoogieFast; Nia Ali; Kristi Castlin; Yvette Lewis; Queen Harrison	United States; United States; Panama; United States	6 April 2013	Gainesville	
5	50.93	USA Red; Brianna Rollins; Lolo Jones; Vashti Thomas; Queen Harrison	United States	25 April 2014	Des Moines	
6	52.00	Russia; Marina Azyabina; Yelena Sinyutina; Eva Sokolova; Yelizaveta Chernyshova	Russia	5 June 1993	Portsmouth	
7	52.01	Jamaica; Shermaine Williams; Andrea Bliss; Monique Morgan; LaToya Greaves	Jamaica	25 April 2014	Des Moines	
8	52.07	Star Athletics; Kellie Wells; Tenaya Jones; LaVonne Idlette; Jacquelyn Coward	United States; United States; Dominican Republic; United States	5 April 2014	Gainesville	
9	52.29	Great Britain / Austria; Danielle Carruthers; Beate Schrott; Tiffany Porter; Isabelle Pederson	United States; Austria; Great Britain; Norway	6 April 2013	Gainesville	
10	52.30	Ukraine; Olena Politika; Olena Alystrasenko; Nadezhda Bodrova; Natalya Kolovanova	Ukraine	5 June 1993	Portsmouth	
11	52.32	Drake Red; Janay DeLoach; Tenaya Jones; Raven Clay; Vashti Thomas	United States; United States; United States; Panama	24 April 2015	Des Moines	
12	52.38	Star Athletics; Damu Mitchell; Loreal Smith; Tiki James; Kellie Wells	United States	7 April 2012	Gainesville	
13	52.38	Star Athletics; Jacquelyn Coward; Kellie Wells; Tenaya Jones; LaVonne Idlette	United States; United States; United States; Dominican Republic	6 April 2013	Gainesville	
14	52.50	Texas A&M; Vashti Thomas; Gabby Mayo; Donique Flemings; Natasha Ruddock	Panama; United States; United States; Jamaica	23 April 2010	Philadelphia	
15	52.50	Academy Art; Jesseka Raymond; Briana Stewart; Dinesha Bean; Julian Purvis	United States	27 April 2013	Des Moines	
16	52.59	BoogieFest; Queen Harrison; Kristi Castlin; Michaylin Golladay; Beate Schrott	United States; United States; United States; Austria	7 April 2012	Gainesville	
17	52.62	Elite Athletes; Christina Manning; Sharika Nelvis; Raven Clay; Cambrya Jones	United States	4 April 2015	Gainesville	
18	52.77	Louisiana State University; Tenaya Jones; Angel Boyd; Jessica Ohanaja; Nickiesha Wilson	United States; United States; Nigeria; Jamaica	25 April 2008	Philadelphia	
19	52.85	Illinois; Jenny Kallur; Camee Williams; Susanna Kallur; Perdita Felicien	Sweden; United States; Sweden; Canada	28 April 2001	Des Moines	
20	52.87	Clemson; Brianna Rollins; Bridgette Owens; Kendra Harrison; Monique Gracia	United States	7 April 2012	Gainesville	

=== Mixed – 4 × 110 m ===
Updated November 2024

Rank	Time	Team	Nationality	Date	Place	Ref.
1	54.27	AK Sloboda, Varaždin; Roko Farkaš; Klara Koščak; Janko Kišak; Jana Koščak	Croatia	4 May 2024	Zagreb	[Meet Results?]
2	54.42	Team Blue; Kristi Castlin; Spencer Adams; Nia Ali; Eddie Lovett	United States; United States; United States; US Virgin Islands	30 April 2016	Des Moines	
3	54.77	Team Red; Jasmin Stowers; Hansle Parchment; Jaqueline Coward; Aries Merritt	United States	30 April 2016	Des Moines	
4	54.89	Team Green; Kendra Harrison; Aleec Harris; Brianna Rollins; Omar McLeod	United States; United States; United States; Jamaica	30 April 2016	Des Moines	
5	54.96	Christina Clemons; Freddie Crittenden; Sharika Nelvis; Devon Allen	United States	11 May 2019	Yokohama	
6	55.09	Sharika Nelvis; Freddie Crittenden; Queen Harrison; Ryan Fontenot	United States	11 May 2019	Yokohama	
7	55.47	Amoi Brown; Andrew Riley; Megan Tapper; Ronald Levy	Jamaica	11 May 2019	Yokohama	
8	55.59	Ayako Kimura; Shunya Takayama; Masumi Aoki; Taio Kanai	Japan	11 May 2019	Yokohama	
9	56.13	Ayako Kimura; Shunya Takayama; Masumi Aoki; Taio Kanai	Japan	11 May 2019	Yokohama	
10	56.40	Brianna Beahan; Nicholas Hough; Celeste Mucci; Nick Andrews	Australia	11 May 2019	Yokohama	
11	56.53	Monika Zapalska; Erik Balnuweit; Anne Weigold; Gregor Traber	Germany	1 May 2021	Chorzów	

== See also ==
- List of world records in athletics
- List of United States collegiate records in track and field
