= Kansas Relays =

Annual track and field competition

Tournament information
- Location: 6100 Rock Chalk Drive; Lawrence, Kansas
- Dates: Third Thursday in April–Third Saturday in April
- Established: 1923
- Administrator: University of Kansas
- Format: Track and field

The Kansas Relays are a three-day track meet every April, held at the University of Kansas in Lawrence, Kansas. Since 1923, the Kansas Relays have attracted runners, throwers, and jumpers from all over the United States of America, bringing in athletes ranging from Olympians to high-schoolers. Olympians such as Marion Jones and Maurice Greene compete in the Gold Zone portion of the meet, which attracts thousands of spectators every year. Competitors have also broken world records at the meet. The 2004 Olympic champion, Justin Gatlin, was a prominent athlete to fail a doping test at the Kansas Relays.

== History ==
The Kansas relays were founded by John H. Outland, the head football coach at the University of Kansas, in 1923. He got the idea for the Kansas Relays from the Penn Relays. The Penn Relays are held at the University of Pennsylvania and is the oldest and largest track meet in the United States. Outland attended the University of Pennsylvania for medical school and where he first saw the Penn relays. John Outland thought that there should be an event like the Penn relays in Kansas so in 1920 he approached Kansas basketball coach Forrest Clare Allen, also known as Phog Allen, who was also the athletic director, football and basketball coach at the University of Kansas. Three years later in 1923 the Kansas relays were founded.

More than 600 athletes participated in the 1st annual Kansas relays on April 20, 1923. During the relays early years the meet featured collegiate athletes in track and field such as Tom Poor, Ed Weir, and Tom Churchill were some of the athletes who later competed in the Olympics. Tom Poor was the first to win the high jump event in Kansas Relays, with a jump of six feet and a quarter inch. He later went on to place fourth in the 1924 Olympics. Ed Weir set a world record for the 120 meter high hurdles at the Kansas Relays in 1926. With world-class athletes competing in the relays, the first decade of the relays paved the way for the Kansas Relays to be a major event in the track and field event in the Mid-West.

1962 was the first year that female athletes were able to compete in the Kansas Relays and by 1976 women were competing in a number of different events. In 1996 a new event was added for women, the pole vault. Stacy Dragila was the first women to win this event and set an American record at the Kansas Relays. In 1997 the Kansas Relays added the 3000 m steeplechase to the women's events.

The Kansas Relays are held normally every year, but were cancelled in 1943, 1944, and 1945 because of World War II; in 1998 and 1999 because Memorial Stadium was being renovated; and in 2020, 2021, and 2022 because of issues presented by the COVID-19 pandemic. The last day of the relays was also cancelled in 2022 because of severe weather.

== The Gold Zone ==
In 2005, the Kansas Relays added a new section: the Gold Zone. The Gold Zone was created because the relays started to lose the interest of spectators and athletes. Tim Weaver, then the meet director, created the Gold Zone to bring in more interest for the Relays and create a three-hour meet-within-a-meet. The Gold Zone was a part of the meet that features some of the best athletes in track and field in the top events. 24,000 spectators came to see former American Olympians, world champions, and top NCAA athletes compete in various events in the first Gold Zone. The events included in the Gold Zone include finals for all the dashes (100m, 400m, hurdles, etc.), 4 × 100 meter relay, 4 × 400 meter relay, the high jump, pole vault, the women's 3000 meter steeplechase and the men's one mile run. Marion Jones, Maurice Greene, Jearl Miles Clark, Amy Acuff, and Nick Hysong are some of the Olympians and world record holders that have competed in the Gold Zone. Gold Zone II drew over 26,000 fans in 2006 making the track meet one of the top ten largest in the world.

== Justin Gatlin doping test ==
Olympic gold medalist in the 100 meter Justin Gatlin tested positive for testosterone at the Kansas Relays 2006. On April 22, 2006, Justin competed with his teammates, Sprint Capitol, in the 4 × 100 meter race at the Kansas Relays. Justin and his team took first place with a time of 38.16 seconds.

On July 29, 2006, Justin Gatlin announced to the media that he had tested positive for high levels of testosterone at the Kansas Relays. Justin Gatlin was facing a lifetime ban from track and field, because he had already tested positive for an amphetamine 2001 at the Junior Olympics. It was determined that the amphetamine came from a prescription he had been taking for years. Justin avoided the lifetime ban by cooperating with doping authorities. On December 31, 2007, it was announced that Gatlin would be banned from track for four years, which made him ineligible to compete in the 2008 Beijing Summer Olympics.

== Meet records ==
=== Men ===
Men's meeting records of the Kansas Relays
Event	Record	Athlete	Nationality	Date	Ref.
100 m	9.95 (+0.8 m/s)	Ivory Williams	United States	17 April 2010	
200 m	20.15	James Mallard	United States	19 April 1980	
400 m	45.12	Devon Morris	Jamaica	19 April 1986	
800 m	1:48.22	Viktors Lācis	Latvia	15 April 2000	
Wes Santee 1500 m	3:38.62	Rick Wohlhuter	United States	17 April 1976	
Glenn Cunningham Mile	3:54.7	Jim Ryun	United States	15 April 1967	
5000 m	13:40.35	Kipsubai Koskei	Kenya	19 April 1980	
10,000 m	28:56.9	Simon Kilili	United States	15 April 1978	
110 m hurdles	13.26	Antwon Hicks	United States	19 April 2008	
400 m hurdles	48.20	Bershawn Jackson	United States	21 April 2012	
3000 m steeplechase	8:33.7	Randy Smith	United States	17 April 1976	
High jump	2.31 m (7 ft 6 in)	Hollis Conway	United States	18 April 1987	
Pole vault	5.91 m (19 ft 4 in)	Joe Dial	United States	16 April 1983	
Long jump	8.14 m (26 ft 8 in)	Kenny Harrison	United States	18 April 1987	
Triple jump	17.04 m (55 ft 10 in)	Kenny Harrison	United States	13 April 1986	
Shot put	22.67 m (74 ft 4 in)	Kevin Toth	United States	19 April 2003	
Discus throw	67.13 m (220 ft 2 in)	Mason Finley	United States	19 April 2019	
Hammer throw	78.04 m (256 ft 0 in)	Gleb Dudarev	Belarus	20 April 2018	
Javelin throw	81.96 m (268 ft 10 in)	Scott Russell	Canada	22 April 2011	
Decathlon	8380 pts	Steve Fritz	United States	1997	
Decathlon	100m / Long jump / Shot put / High jump / 400m / 110m H / Discus / Pole vault / Javelin / 1500m				
4 × 100 m relay	38.16	Sprint Capitol: Dwight Thomas; Rodney Martin; Shawn Crawford; Justin Gatlin	Jamaica; United States; United States; United States	22 April 2006	
4 × 200 m relay	1:21.55	Philadelphia Pioneers: Steve Riddick; Fred Taylor; Herman Frazier; Tony Darden	United States; United States; United States; United States	18 April 1980	
4 × 400 m relay	3:03.67	Philadelphia Pioneers: Tim Dale; Fred Taylor; Herman Frazier; Tony Darden	United States; United States; United States; United States	19 April 1980	
4 × 800 m relay	7:21.2	Oklahoma State: Jim Metcalf; John Perry; Tom Von Ruden; Dave Perry	United States	17 April 1965	
Distance medley relay	9:20.10	University of Arkansas: Reuben Reina; Charles Williams; Robert Bradley; Joe Falcon	United States; United States; United States; United States	15 April 1989	
4 × 110m Shuttle hurdles relay	57.69	University of Nebraska–Lincoln: David Davis; Nenad Lončar; Courtney Jones; Andy Nelson	United States; Serbia; United States; United States	19 April 2003	

=== Women ===
Women's meeting records of the Kansas Relays
Event	Record	Athlete	Nationality	Date	Ref.
100 m	11.04	Allyson Felix	United States	22 April 2006	
200 m	22.32 (+0.9 m/s)	Veronica Campbell Brown	Jamaica	17 April 2010	
400 m	51.19	Mary Wineberg	United States	21 April 2007	
800 m	2:01.30	LeAnn Warren	United States	18 April 1981	
1500 m	4:08.94	Nadezhda Ralldugina	Soviet Union	16 April 1983	
5000 m	15:42.76	Sharon Lokedi	United States	20 April 2018	
10,000 m	34:41.33	Amber Anderson	United States	15 April 1995	
100 m hurdles	12.72	Nichole Denby	United States	21 April 2007	
400 m hurdles	55.67	Nawal El Moutawakel	Morocco	21 April 1984	
3000 m steeplechase	10:07.30	Trina Cox	United States	21 April 2007	
High jump	1.89 m (6 ft 2 1/4 in)	Julieanne Broughton	United States	21 April 1990	
Pole vault	4.51 m (14 ft 9 1/2 in)	Brynn King	United States	18 April 2024	
Long jump	6.68 m (21 ft 10 3/4 in)	Elva Goulbourne	Jamaica	19 April 2008	
Triple jump	14.88 m (48 ft 9 3/4 in)	Trecia Smith	Jamaica	20 April 2002	
Shot put	17.39 m (57 ft 1/2 in)	Kearsten Peoples	United States	21 April 2012	
Discus throw	60.94 m (199 ft 11 in)	Penny Neer	United States	20 April 1991	
Hammer throw	69.66 m (228 ft 6 in)	Amber Campbell	United States	20 April 2013	
Javelin throw	58.73 m (192 ft 8 in)	Dana Olson	United States	17 April 1982	
Heptathlon	5740 pts	Liz Roehrig	United States	2008	
Heptathlon	100m H / High jump / Shot put / 200m / Long jump / Javelin / 800m				
4 × 100 m relay	43.94	University of Nebraska–Lincoln: Janet Burke; Rhonda Blanford; Angela Thacker; Merlene Ottey	Jamaica; United States; United States; Jamaica	16 April 1983	
4 × 200 m relay	1:33.63	Barton County CC: Sonia Williams; Natalee Sterling; Mikessia Triplette; Aleen Bailey	Antigua and Barbuda; Jamaica; United States; Jamaica	21 April 2000	
4 × 400 m relay	3:31.87	University of Kansas: Denesha Morris; Paris Daniels; Shayla Wilson; Diamond Dixon	Jamaica; United States; United States; United States	21 April 2012	
4 × 800 m relay	8:46.62	Villanova University: Mary Ellen McGowan; Debbie Grant; Joanne Kehs; Veronica McIntosh	United States	21 April 1984	
Distance medley relay	11:32.61	University of Michigan: Jessica Kluge; Richelle Webb; Karen Harvey; Molly McClimon	United States; United States; Canada; United States	17 April 1993	
4 × 100m Shuttle hurdles relay	54.02	University of Nebraska–Lincoln:		20 April 2001	
