= Athletics at the 2001 Summer Universiade – Men's 110 metres hurdles =

The women's 110 metres hurdles event at the 2001 Summer Universiade was held at the Workers Stadium in Beijing, China on 27–28 August.

== Medalists ==
Gold	Silver	Bronze
Liu Xiang; China	Elmar Lichtenegger; Austria	Robert Kronberg; Sweden

== Results ==
=== Heats ===
Held on 27 August
Wind:
Heat 1: +2.2 m/s, Heat 2: +1.2 m/s, Heat 3: +1.1 m/s, Heat 4: +2.0 m/s

Rank	Heat	Athlete	Nationality	Time	Notes
1	1	Ron Bramlett	United States	13.39	Q
2	3	Elmar Lichtenegger	Austria	13.52	Q
3	3	Aubrey Herring	United States	13.58	Q
4	4	Liu Xiang	China	13.61	Q
5	2	Yuniel Hernández	Cuba	13.68	Q
6	4	Ralf Leberer	Germany	13.72	Q
7	2	Masato Naito	Japan	13.73	Q
8	4	Marcel van der Westen	Netherlands	13.75	Q
9	1	Robert Kronberg	Sweden	13.78	Q
10	2	Leonard Hudec	Austria	13.86	Q
11	1	Redelén dos Santos	Brazil	13.87	Q
12	1	Yuriy Volkov	Russia	13.91	q
13	3	Andrew Lissade	Canada	13.91	Q
14	2	Maurice Wignall	Jamaica	13.95	q
15	3	Andrey Kislykh	Russia	13.95	q
16	1	Qi Zhen	China	13.98	q
17	3	Dimitrios Pietris	Greece	14.00	
18	4	Márcio de Souza	Brazil	14.09	
19	2	Jared MacLeod	Canada	14.13	
20	1	Stuart Anderson	Australia	14.17	
21	4	Nikolay Koykov	Bulgaria	14.38	
22	4	Hugh Henry	Barbados	14.38	
23	4	Sergey Smolenskiy	Ukraine	14.46	
24	3	Lin Chung-chieh	Chinese Taipei	14.57	
25	1	Blaž Korent	Slovenia	14.79	
26	3	Raie Khraisat	Jordan	15.17	
27	1	Mohamed Basheer	Iraq	16.13	
28	3	Kong Hou In	Macau	17.06	
29	4	Chan Ming Sang	Hong Kong	17.45	
	2	Mohamed Issa Al-Thawadi	Qatar	DNF	

=== Semifinals ===
Held on 28 August
Wind:
Heat 1: -1.3 m/s, Heat 2: -2.3 m/s

Rank	Heat	Athlete	Nationality	Time	Notes
1	1	Liu Xiang	China	13.61	Q
2	1	Ron Bramlett	United States	13.64	Q
3	2	Yuniel Hernández	Cuba	13.66	Q
4	2	Aubrey Herring	United States	13.71	Q
5	1	Maurice Wignall	Jamaica	13.72	Q
6	2	Elmar Lichtenegger	Austria	13.75	Q
7	1	Masato Naito	Japan	13.77	Q
8	2	Robert Kronberg	Sweden	13.87	Q
9	1	Leonard Hudec	Austria	13.89	
10	1	Ralf Leberer	Germany	13.90	
11	2	Marcel van der Westen	Netherlands	13.99	
12	2	Yuriy Volkov	Russia	14.03	
13	1	Andrey Kislykh	Russia	14.07	
14	1	Redelén dos Santos	Brazil	14.11	
15	2	Qi Zhen	China	14.35	
16	2	Andrew Lissade	Canada	14.66	

=== Final ===
Held on 28 August
Wind: +1.6 m/s

Rank	Athlete	Nationality	Time	Notes
1st place, gold medalist(s)	Liu Xiang	China	13.33	
2nd place, silver medalist(s)	Elmar Lichtenegger	Austria	13.36	
3rd place, bronze medalist(s)	Robert Kronberg	Sweden	13.40	
4	Ron Bramlett	United States	13.49	
5	Maurice Wignall	Jamaica	13.70	
	Yuniel Hernández	Cuba	DNF	
	Aubrey Herring	United States	DNF	
	Masato Naito	Japan	DQ	
