= Penn Relays =

American track and field competition

- Sport: Track and field
- Founded: April 21, 1895
- Venues: Franklin Field, Philadelphia, Pennsylvania, U.S.
- Sponsor: Toyota
- Website: pennrelays.com

The Penn Relays (officially The Penn Relay Carnival) is the oldest and largest track and field competition in the United States, hosted annually since April 21, 1895 by the University of Pennsylvania at Franklin Field in Philadelphia. In 2012, there were 116 events run at the meet. More athletes run in the Penn Relays than at any other track and field meet in the world. It regularly attracts more than 15,000 participants from high schools, colleges, and track clubs throughout North America and abroad, notably Jamaica, competing in more than 300 events over five days. Historically, the event has been credited with popularizing the running of relay races. It is held during the last full week in April, ending on the last Saturday in April. Attendance typically tops 100,000 over the final three days, and has been known to surpass 50,000 on Saturday. The Penn Relays also holds a Catholic Youth Organization night for Catholic Middle Schools in the Archdiocese of Philadelphia. Preliminaries are run on the Tuesday during the Carnival Week, and the Finals are run on Friday.

The Penn Relays is always held the last week in April and always begins the Thursday of that week. It went on hiatus in 2020 due to COVID-19 pandemic, the only year it did so besides the years from 1917–18 and 1942–45. The event resumed in 2022.

== History ==
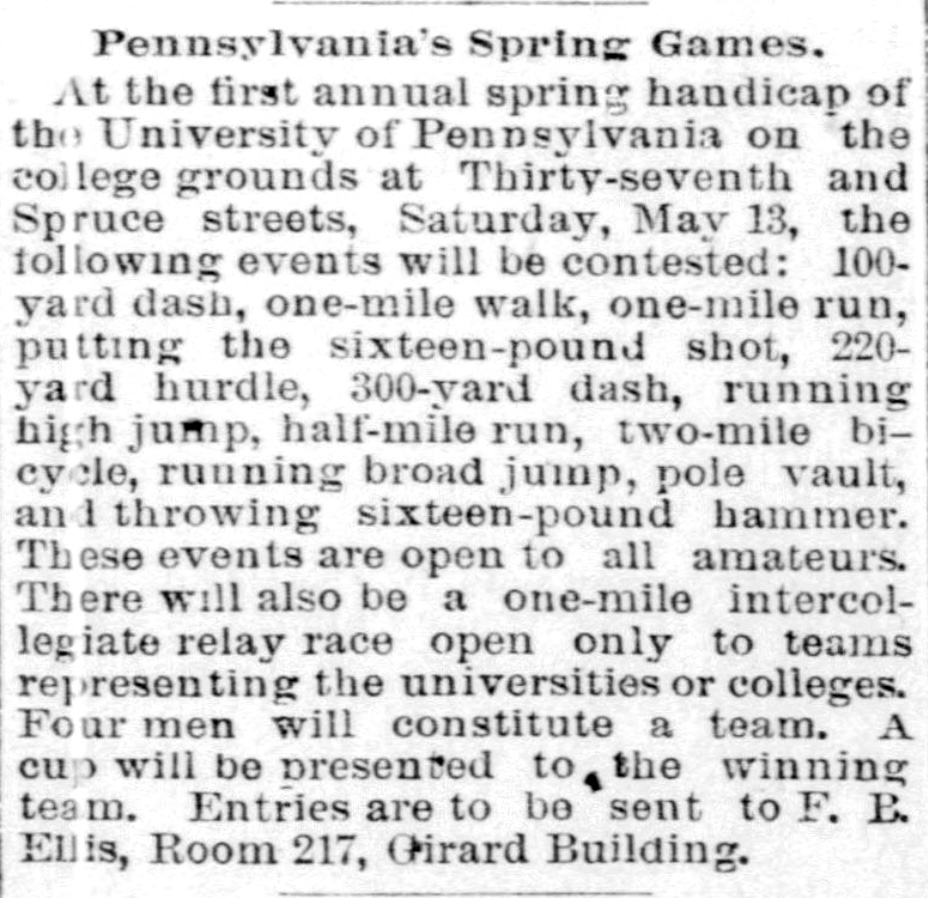
The Philadelphia inquirer, on April 16, 1893, previewed the forthcoming "first annual spring handicap" to be run on May 13, 1893

When the University of Pennsylvania Track and Field committee wanted to add more excitement to their 1893 spring handicapped meet held at Thirty-seventh and Spruce Streets, the University Athletic Grounds prior to the construction of Franklin Field, they came up with the idea of running a relay race at the meet. The team would consist of four men all running a quarter of a mile one after the other. Today this relay race is known as the 4 × 400 m relay. The sport of relay running was only two years old at the time of the first Penn Relays. During the 1893 spring handicapped track meet, the University of Pennsylvania and Princeton University men ran a relay race against each other. The Princeton men won with a time of 3:34, beating the University of Pennsylvania (Penn) by 8 yards.

In 1894, Penn hosted the track and field meet at the university athletic grounds at 37th and Spruce Streets on April 21, 1894.

The Penn Relays affected the history of the sport of relay racing and helped it become as popular as it is today.

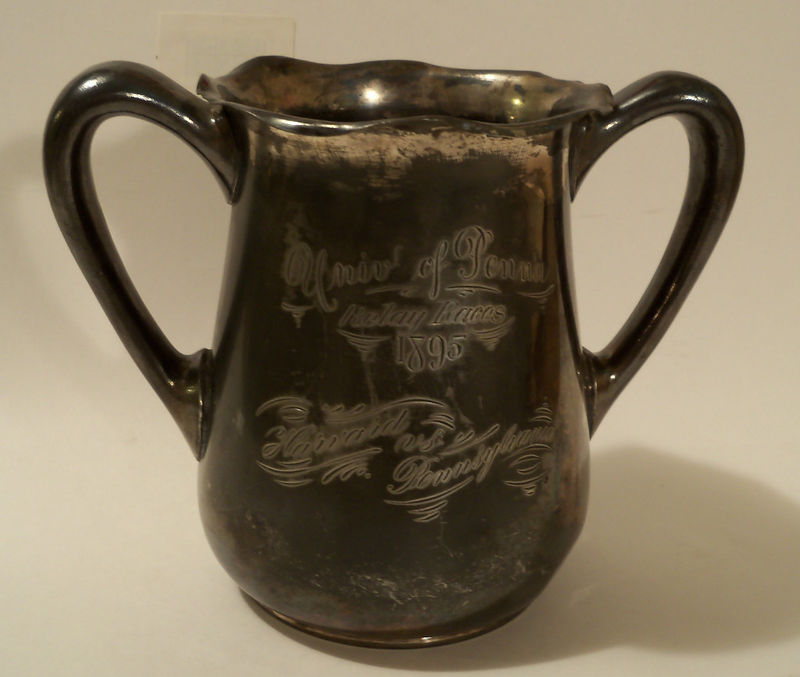
1895 Penn Relay Trophy

=== The first Penn Relay Carnival ===
The first Penn Relay Carnival, held on April 21, 1895, at Franklin Field, was a success. Approximately 5,000 people attended the meet. Nine relay races were run and only two teams were in each race, four of which were high school and prep school races. Another four were college races and one championship college race. The only relay run at that time was the 4 x 400-yard relay or the mile relay. The first team to win a Penn Relays championship was Harvard University, defeating the University of Pennsylvania with a time of 3:34. Other colleges that competed in the meet were Cornell, Columbia, Lafayette, Lehigh, Rutgers, Swarthmore, City College of New York and New York University.

=== Growth of the meet ===
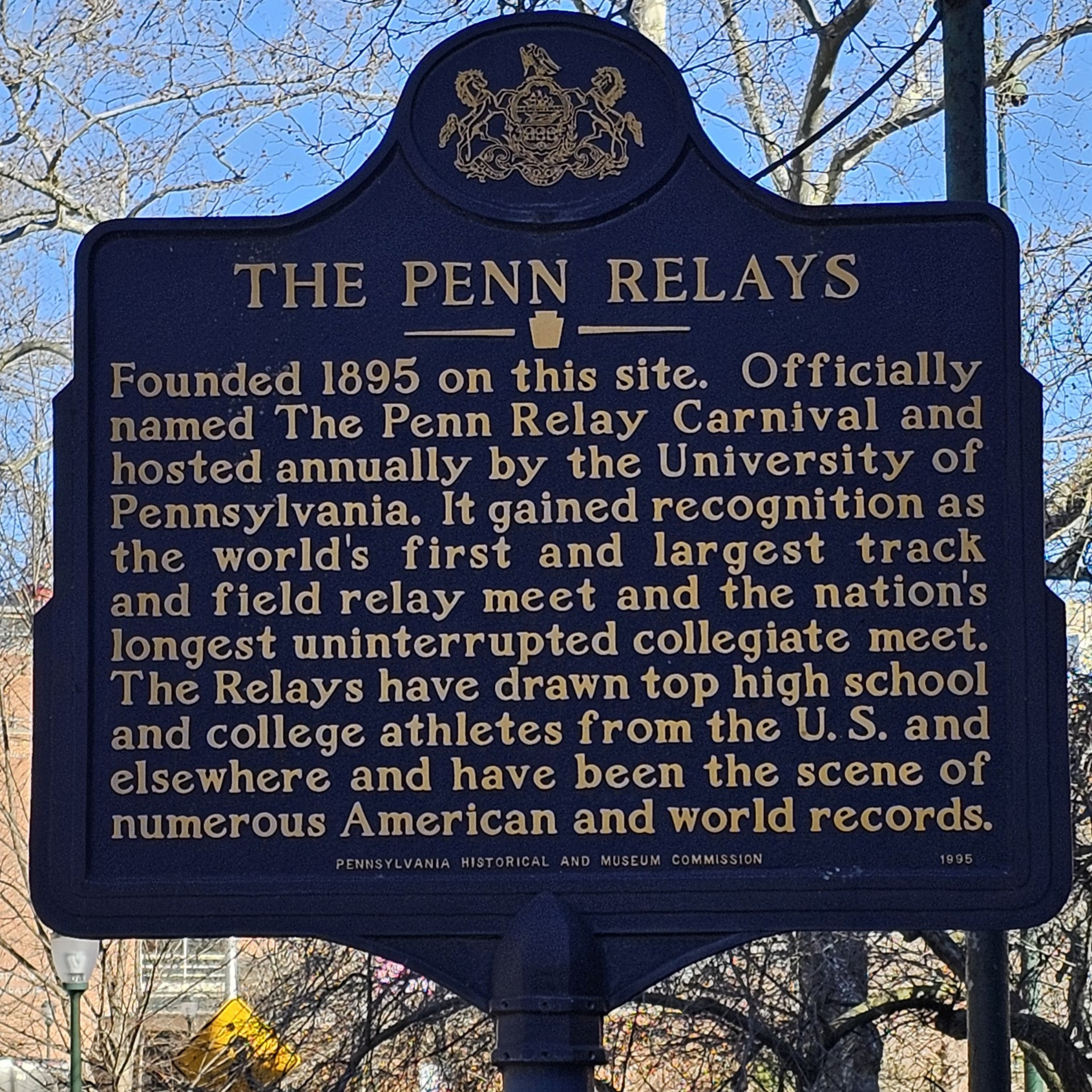
Pennsylvania state historical marker for the Penn Relays on the campus of the University of Pennsylvania, in the northwest corner of Franklin Field

The number of entries from the first Penn Relay Carnival to the second Penn Relay Carnival quadrupled. Because of this, a time schedule of events had to be made to keep the meet organized. A rule was established that if a team was not on time to their race, the race would be run without them. In that same year a 5-mile relay was added to the meet which would later become the 4-mile relay. The next year, in 1897, the 2-mile relay or the 4 × 800 m relay was added to the meet. In 1898, The University of Chicago became the first midwestern team to attend the carnival. In the two years after that, the following events were added to the meet: 100-yard dash, 220-yard dash, 120-yard hurdles, high jump, pole vault, long jump, shot put and hammer throw.

The Term "Carnival" was put into the name of the meet in 1910 because of the carnival-like atmosphere created by the carnival-like tent camp at the meet. Also in 1910, the Intercollegiate Association of Amateur Athletes of America created The Relay Racing Code. The Code created a 20-foot area in front of the starting line in which a touch-off between legs or runners of the relay could be made. This rule later became the rule for the exchange zone or the 20-meter zone (10 meters in front of the finish line, 10 meters behind the finish line) in which a baton can be passed from one leg of a relay to another. At that time there was no such thing as batons or exchange zones that are used in present-day relay racing; instead runners would stand on the starting line and wait for the runner before them to touch their hand. At the 1912 Olympics in Stockholm, exchange zones were used for the first time. In 1913 at the Penn Relay Carnival, the baton was used for the first time. Zones and batons made exchanges from one leg of the relay to the next much more efficient and eventually made relay times much faster.

At the 1911 Penn Relay Carnival, the college and high school championship events became known as the "Championship of America" races. Ten years later the NCAA hosted the first college championship meet, but before then the Penn Relays was thought to be the national championship meet. In 1914, Oxford University turned the Penn Relay Carnival into an international event, becoming the first team outside of the United States to compete. That year Oxford won the 4-mile relay. The 1915 Penn Relay Carnival took place over two days instead of one as in the years before. That same year the sprint medley relay (200m, 200m, 400m, 800m) and the distance medley relay (1200m, 400m, 800m, 1600m) were added to the meet.

At the 1926 Carnival the championship event of the shuttle hurdle relay was added to the Penn Relays events at the suggestion of Lord Burghley, the UK's Olympic hurdler. Around that same time, the loudspeaker was added to the stadium which helped inform the spectators of the events on the track. Before the loudspeaker, announcers used megaphones to inform spectators.

In an effort to gain more participants in the relays, six new lanes were added to the inside of the track. This renovation allowed for more athletes to compete in the sprinting events. That same year the northwest corner of the stadium, previously used as the finishing chute, was now used for the paddock area, where athletes were lined up and organized before their race. In the 1950s the schedule of events was changed so that the more popular events were run on Saturday afternoon.

The Carnival continued to grow as the years went on. In 1956, the number of spectators reached over 35,000 people for the first time and 4,000 athletes competed. Then in 1958, 43,618 people attended the meet. In 1962 women competed for the first time in the 100-yard dash. Two years later the high school girls 440-yard relays was added to the carnival. That same year Jamaican high schools started to compete in the meet.

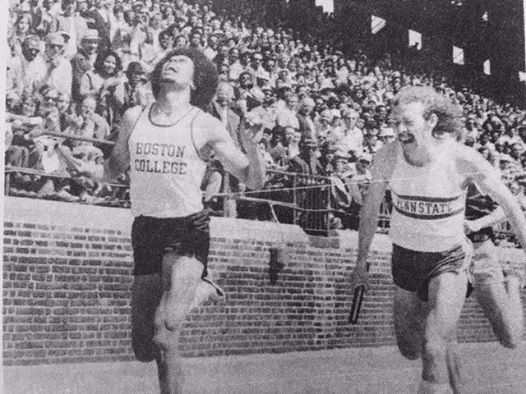
Keith Francis anchors Boston College to win the 1975 Penn Relays Sprint Medley Relay Championship in front of over 40,000 fans at Franklin Field

The Marathon was added to the Carnival in 1973. The next year, distance events were moved on the schedule of events to be run on Thursday night after the second day of the decathlon. Then in 1976, the events were converted into meters instead of yards except for the mile and the 4x120-yard shuttle hurdle relay. A year later, automatic timing was used for results instead of hand timing. The carnival turned into a three-day meet in 1978 because of the addition of more women's relays.

The Penn Relay Carnival did not only grow in the number of spectators, participants and events, it also started to grow financially. In 1988, the carnival used corporate sponsorship instead of just earning money from tickets sold at the door like it had in the years before. In the years that followed, the crowd and number of participants gradually increased and the carnival would become nationally and internationally more popular.

The 2010 Relays featured a "USA vs. The World" program, pitting American teams against elite runners including Usain Bolt, Shelly-Ann Fraser and Alfred Kirwa Yego. The event broke all previous attendance records with a single-day high of 54,310 and the total of 117,346 for the three-day festival.

At the 2016 Relays, Ida Keeling became the first woman in history to complete a 100-meter run at the age of 100, which she did with a time of 1:17.33.

=== COVID outbreak ===
The 2020 Penn Relays was cancelled due to the COVID-19 pandemic in the United States. According to news sources, these were the first times the event had been canceled since the event's inception on April 21, 1895.

=== New events ===
In 2021, organisers split the Penn Relays into two different events -- the Philadelphia Metropolitan Collegiate Invitational presented by Toyota for colleges on the traditional weekend, and the Summer Series, which featured open races held in mid-July. A 5k race around the campus that finishes at the track was also introduced as an October event.

In 2022, the Penn Relays made both the Summer Showcase (now its own separate one-day event) and 5k standard events annual in July and October, respectively.

== Franklin Field ==
Franklin Field was opened in 1895 specifically for the first Penn Relay Carnival. In this same year, Franklin Field was the site of the nation's first scoreboard. According to the NCAA, Franklin Field is the oldest stadium that functions as both a football field and a track and field stadium.

In the fall of 1903, it became the first permanent college stadium in the country and the first stadium with a horseshoe design. The stadium was rebuilt in 1922 to its present-day form. The lower deck seating was made more stable and the upper deck seating was added to the stadium to allow for more spectators. After Franklin Field's renovations, it became the first two-tiered stadium. In 1967 the 10 lane synthetic track was added to replace the old overused cinder track.

== Prizes ==
=== The plaque ===
The plaque was first given out at the 1925 Penn Relay Carnival. The design that is on the plaque and the medals was created by Dr. R. Tait McKenzie. The picture on the awards features the founder of the University of Pennsylvania, Benjamin Franklin, sitting in his library chair holding a laurel sprig in his left hand. Four nude runners stand facing him in a line all holding hands. The last runner in the line is holding the baton of the relay. Former University of Pennsylvania runners Larry Brown, Louis Madeira, George Orton and Ted Meredith posed as models for the design. The design is carved onto an 18" or 8" bronze plate and mounted on a wooden circle. Around the bronze picture, on the wooden part of the plaque, reads "Relay Carnival" above the design and "University of Pennsylvania" below the design.

=== Other prizes by event ===
==== College championship relays ====
The winning team in the college "Championship of America" relays will receive an 18" bronze plaque. The individuals on the first place relay will receive gold watches. Individuals on the second place team will receive silver medals. Individuals on the third, fourth and fifth place relays will receive bronze medals.

==== College relays ====
The winning teams of the non-championship college relays will receive an 8" plaque. Individuals on the second place team will receive silver medals. Individuals on the third, fourth and fifth place relays will receive bronze medals. The prizes for the college relays are the same for the Military Academies races except the individuals on the first place teams will receive gold watches as well and the plaque.

==== College championship individual events ====
First place individuals receive gold watches. Second will receive silver medals. Third, fourth and fifth receive bronze medals.

==== College individual events ====
First place individuals receive gold medals instead of gold watches. Second will receive silver medals. Third, fourth and fifth receive bronze medals.

==== High school championship relays ====
The winning team in the high school "Championship of America" relays will receive an 18" bronze plaque. The individuals on the first place relay will receive gold watches. Individuals on the second place team will receive silver medals. Individuals on the third, fourth and fifth place relays will receive bronze medals. If a team from outside the United States wins one of these races, watches will also be given to the first American team in this race.

==== High school championship individual events ====
First place individuals receive gold watches. Second will receive silver medals. Third, fourth and fifth receive bronze medals. Just like in the high school championship relays, the first American individual will receive the gold watch.

==== Olympic development relays ====
The first place relay will receive an 8" bronze plaque. The plaque will go to the first national team whose members are all the same nationality or the first USAT&F registered club whose members are all members of the same club. The individuals on the first place relay will receive gold watches. Individuals on the second place team will receive silver medals. Individuals on the third, fourth and fifth place relays will receive bronze medals.

==== Olympic development individual events ====
First place individuals receive gold watches. Second will receive silver medals. Third, fourth and fifth receive bronze medals.

==== Masters, Special Olympics, and blind relays ====
The first place team will receive an 8" bronze plaque. Individuals on the winning relay will receive gold medals. Individuals on the second place relay will receive silver medals. Individuals on the third fourth and fifth place teams will receive bronze medals.

==== Masters, Special Olympics, and blind individual events ====
First place individuals receive gold medals. Second will receive silver medals. Third, fourth and fifth place receive bronze medals.

==== IC4A men's and ECAC women's relays ====
The winning teams of these relays will receive an 8" plaque. Individuals on the second place team will receive silver medals. Individuals on the third, fourth and fifth place relays will receive bronze medals. If the times of winners of these races are faster than that of the college championship races, they will receive gold watches.

==== High school Philadelphia, Tri-State, and consolation races ====
The first place team will receive an 8" bronze plaque. Individuals on the winning relay will receive gold medals. Individuals on the second place relay will receive silver medals. Individuals on the third, fourth, and fifth plea teams will receive bronze medals.

==== High school 4 × 400 m and 4 × 800 m and prep school 4 × 100 m and 4 × 400 m relays ====
The first place team will receive an 8" bronze plaque. Individuals on the winning relay will receive gold medals. Individuals on the second place relay will receive silver medals. Individuals on the third place teams will receive bronze medals.

==== Elementary school, junior high school, middle school, and parochial school relays ====
The first place team will receive an 8" bronze plaque. Individuals on the winning relay will receive gold medals. Individuals on the second place relay will receive silver medal Individuals on the third place teams will receive bronze medals.

== In popular culture ==
- Bayard Rustin was an African-American civil rights activist and the principal organizer of the 1963 March on Washington for Jobs and Freedom. Rustin is one of two men who both ran at the Penn Relays and had a school named in his honor.
- In the novel Crash by Jerry Spinelli, a boy is named "Penn" by his great-grandfather, who ran in the Penn Relays. In the end Penn gets to run in the Penn Relays.
- The Penn Relays play a key role in "Off to the Races," a second-season episode of The Cosby Show. Cliff Huxtable (Bill Cosby) is invited to participate in a relay race during the event, but finds himself running against Olympic medalist Valerie Brisco-Hooks.

== World records ==
Over the course of its history, originally one world record was set at the Penn Relays (though it was revoked following doping results), and one record was subsequently declared a world record after World Athletics began recognising the event. The 2006 distance medley relay Kenyan team was the first world record recognised by World Athletics from this event when the event became an official event at their Relays event on May 1, 2015.

== Meet records ==
=== Men ===
Men's meeting records of the Penn Relays
Event	Record	Athlete	Nationality	Date	Ref.
100 m	10.10	Leroy Burrell	United States	April 1990	
600 m	1:15.88	Alex Amankwah	Ghana	30 April 2022	
Mile	3:51.06	Yared Nuguse	United States	27 April 2024	
5000 m	13:16.47	Shadrack Kosgei	Kenya	2003	
10,000 m	27:50.0	Sosthenes Bitok	Kenya	1984	
110 m hurdles	13.11 (±0.0 m/s)	Devon Allen	United States	30 April 2022	
400 m hurdles	48.91	Derrick Adkins	United States	April 1994	
3000 m steeplechase	8:22.96	Isaac Updike	United States	29 April 2022	
High jump	2.30 m	Mark Boswell	Canada	April 2000	
High jump	2.30 m	Tora Harris	United States	April 2002	
Pole vault	5.79 m	Lawrence Johnson	United States	April 1996	
Triple jump	17.12 m	Jérôme Romain	United States	April 1995	
Discus throw	67.02 m	Claudio Romero	Chile	30 April 2022	
5000 m walk (track)	19:23.30	Nick Christie	United States	28 April 2022	
10,000 m walk (track)	39:43.85	Tim Seaman	United States	1999	
4 × 100 m relay	37.90	Jamaica Gold: Mario Forsythe; Yohan Blake; Marvin Anderson; Usain Bolt	Jamaica	24 April 2010	
4 × 200 m relay	1:19.67	TCU: Lindel Frater; Ricardo Williams; Darvis Patton; Kim Collins	Jamaica; Jamaica; United States; Saint Kitts and Nevis	29 April 2000	
4 × 400 m relay	2:56.60	USA Red: Angelo Taylor 45.0; Antonio Pettigrew 44.2; Tyree Washington 43.7; Michael Johnson 43.7	United States	29 April 2000	
Sprint medley relay (2,2,4,8)	3:11.45	Beejay Lee; Wallace Spearmon; Bryshon Nellum; Donavan Brazier	United States	29 April 2017	
4 × 800 m relay	7:11.17	Penn State University: Vance Watson; Steve Shisler; Christ Mills; Randy Moore	United States	1985	
Distance medley relay	9:15.56	Elkanah Angwenyi 2:50.8 (1200m); Thomas Musembi 45.8 (400m); Alfred Kirwa Yego 1:46.2 (800m); Alex Kipchirchir 3:52.8 (1600 m)	Kenya	29 April 2006	
4 × Mile relay	15:51.91	Villanova University: Sean Donaghue; Charlie O'Donovan; Marco Langon; Liam Murphy		27 April 2024	
4×110 m Shuttle hurdles relay	53.94	University of South Carolina: Corey Taylor; Fred Townsend; Charles Ryan; Kenneth Ferguson	United States	2003	

=== Women ===
Women's meeting records of the Penn Relays
Event	Record	Athlete	Nationality	Date	Ref.
100 m	11.10	Lauryn Williams	United States	April 2004	
100 m	11.10	Kelly-Ann Baptiste	Trinidad and Tobago	April 2006	
600 m	1:22.74	Athing Mu	United States	30 April 2022	
800 m	1:59.76	Sage Hurta	United States	30 April 2022	
1500 m	4:01.76	Josette Andrews	United States	26 April 2025	
Mile	4:26.10	Mary Slaney	United States	1997	
3000 m	9:03.8	Sabrina Dornhoefer	United States	1985	
5000 m	15:17.11	Laura Mykytok	United States	1995	
10,000 m	31:30.89	Annette Peters	United States	1997	
100 m hurdles	12.61 (+1.1 m/s)	Queen Quedith Harrison	United States	April 24, 2010	
3000 m steeplechase	9:55.43	Brianna Ilarda	Australia	April 25, 2019	
High jump	1.94 m	Angela Bradburn	United States	April 1996	
High jump	1.94 m	Tisha Waller	United States	April 1998	
Pole vault	4.45 m	Tina Sutej	Slovenia	April 28, 2011	
Triple jump	14.20 m (+1.7 m/s)	Thea LaFond	Dominica	April 29, 2017	
5000 m walk (track)	20:56.88	Michelle Rohl	United States	1996	
4 × 100 m relay	42.19	USA Red: Tianna Madison; Allyson Felix; Bianca Knight; Carmelita Jeter	United States	April 28, 2012	
4 × 200 m relay	1:27.46	LaTasha Jenkins; LaTasha Colander-Richardson; Nanceen Perry; Marion Jones	United States	April 29, 2000	
4 × 400 m relay	3:21.18	USA Red: Francena McCorory; Allyson Felix; Natasha Hastings; Sanya Richards	United States	April 28, 2012	
4 × 800 m relay	8:04.31	Team USA Red: Lea Wallace; Brenda Martinez; Ajeé Wilson; Alysia Montano	United States	April 27, 2013	
4 × 1500 m relay	16:53.87	University of Arkansas: Isabel van Camp; Logan Jolly; Lauren Gregory; Krissy Gear	United States	30 April 2022	
Sprint medley relay (1,1,2,4)	1:35.20	Destinee Brown (100 m); Aaliyah Brown (100 m); Kimberlyn Duncan (200 m); Raevyn Rogers (400 m)	United States	April 28, 2018	
Sprint medley relay (2,2,4,8)	3:34.56	Sherri-Ann Brooks (200 m); Rosemarie Whyte(200 m); Moya Thompson 51.7 (400 m); Kenia Sinclair 1:57.43 (800 m)	Jamaica	April 2009	
Distance medley relay	10:37.55	Harvard University: Sophia Gorriaran 3:20.36 (1200 m); Chloe Fair 53.20 (400 m); Victoria Bossong 2:02.54 (800 m); Maia Ramsden 4:21.47 (1600 m)	United States; United States; United States; New Zealand	26 April 2024	
4 × 100 m Shuttle hurdles relay	52.50	Texas A&M University: Vashti Thomas; Gabby Mayo; Donique Flemings; Natasha Ruddock	United States	April 23, 2010	
