= 2019 IAAF World Relays – Mixed shuttle hurdles relay =

Mixed shuttle hurdles relay at the 2019 IAAF World Relays
- Venue: Nissan Stadium
- Dates: 11 May (heats & final)
- Nations: 7
- Winning time: 54.96

Medalists
gold medal	Christina Clemons; Freddie Crittenden; Sharika Nelvis; Devon Allen; Queen Harrison*; Ryan Fontenot*	United States
silver medal	Ayako Kimura; Shunya Takayama; Masumi Aoki; Taio Kanai	Japan

The mixed shuttle hurdle relay at the 2019 IAAF World Relays was held at the Nissan Stadium on 11 May.

== Results ==
KEY:	Q	Qualified	q	Fastest non-qualifiers	WL	World leading	CR	Championship record	NR	National record	SB	Seasonal best

=== Heats ===
Qualification: The winner of each heat (Q) plus the 2 fastest times (q) advanced to the final.

Rank	Heat	Nation	Athletes	Time	Notes
1	2	United States	Sharika Nelvis (W), Freddie Crittenden (M), Queen Harrison (W), Ryan Fontenot (M)	55.09	Q
2	1	Jamaica	Amoi Brown (W), Andrew Riley (M), Megan Tapper (W), Ronald Levy (M)	55.47	Q
3	1	Japan	Ayako Kimura (W), Shunya Takayama (M), Masumi Aoki (W), Taio Kanai (M)	56.13	q
4	1	Australia	Brianna Beahan (W), Nicholas Hough (M), Celeste Mucci (W), Nick Andrews (M)	56.40	q
5	2	France	Sacha Alessandrini (W), Wilhem Belocian (M), Laura Valette (W), Pascal Martinot-Lagarde (M)	56.56	
6	2	China	Shi Jiali (W), Sun Zhenjiang (M), Wu Yanni (W), Zeng Jianhang (M)	57.54	
7	2	Papua New Guinea	Adrine Monagi (W), Mowen Boino (M), Donna Koniel (W), Daniel Baul (M)	1:07.32	

=== Final ===
Rank	Nation	Athletes	Time	Notes	Points
1st place, gold medalist(s)	United States	Christina Clemons (W), Freddie Crittenden (M), Sharika Nelvis (W), Devon Allen (M)	54.96	SB	8
2nd place, silver medalist(s)	Japan	Ayako Kimura (W), Shunya Takayama (M), Masumi Aoki (W), Taio Kanai (M)	55.59	SB	7
	Australia	Brianna Beahan (W), Nicholas Hough (M), Celeste Mucci (W), Nick Andrews (M)	DQ	R162.8	0
	Jamaica		DNS		0
