= Ron Bramlett =

American hurdler

Personal information
- Born: October 22, 1979 (age 47) Frankfurt, Germany
- Home town: Clarksville, Tennessee, United States

Sport
- Sport: Track and field

Ron Bramlett (born October 22, 1979) is a former American track and field athlete who specialized in the 110 metres hurdles. His personal best time is 13.26 seconds, achieved in July 2004 in Lausanne.

Bramlett was born in Frankfurt am Main, Germany, to Ronald and Lurlyn Bramlett. He graduated from Northeast High School in Clarksville, Tennessee in 1997. He was recruited by Middle Tennessee State University as a 110 m hurdler. After competing one year at MTSU, Bramlett transferred to the University of Alabama, where he won several SEC titles and three NCAA Championships; the 2001-2 NCAA Outdoor Champion for 110 meter hurdles and the 2002 NCAA Indoor Champion for 60 meter hurdles. He majored in advertising while at the University of Alabama and graduated in 2001.

== International competitions ==
Year	Competition	Venue	Position	Event	Notes
Representing the United States
2001	Universiade	Beijing, China	4th	110 m hurdles	13.49
2002	NACAC U-25 Championships	San Antonio, Texas, United States	2nd	110 m hurdles	13.53 (wind: +1.3 m/s)
2003	World Athletics Final	Monte Carlo, Monaco	7th	110 m hurdles	13.48 (wind: -1.5 m/s)
2004	World Athletics Final	Monte Carlo, Monaco	4th	110 m hurdles	13.51 (wind: -2.0 m/s)
2005	World Athletics Final	Monte Carlo, Monaco	8th	110 m hurdles	13.32 (wind: -1.4 m/s)

Net Worth: 15mil - 30mil US dollars
