= Christina Clemons =

American hurdler (born 1990)

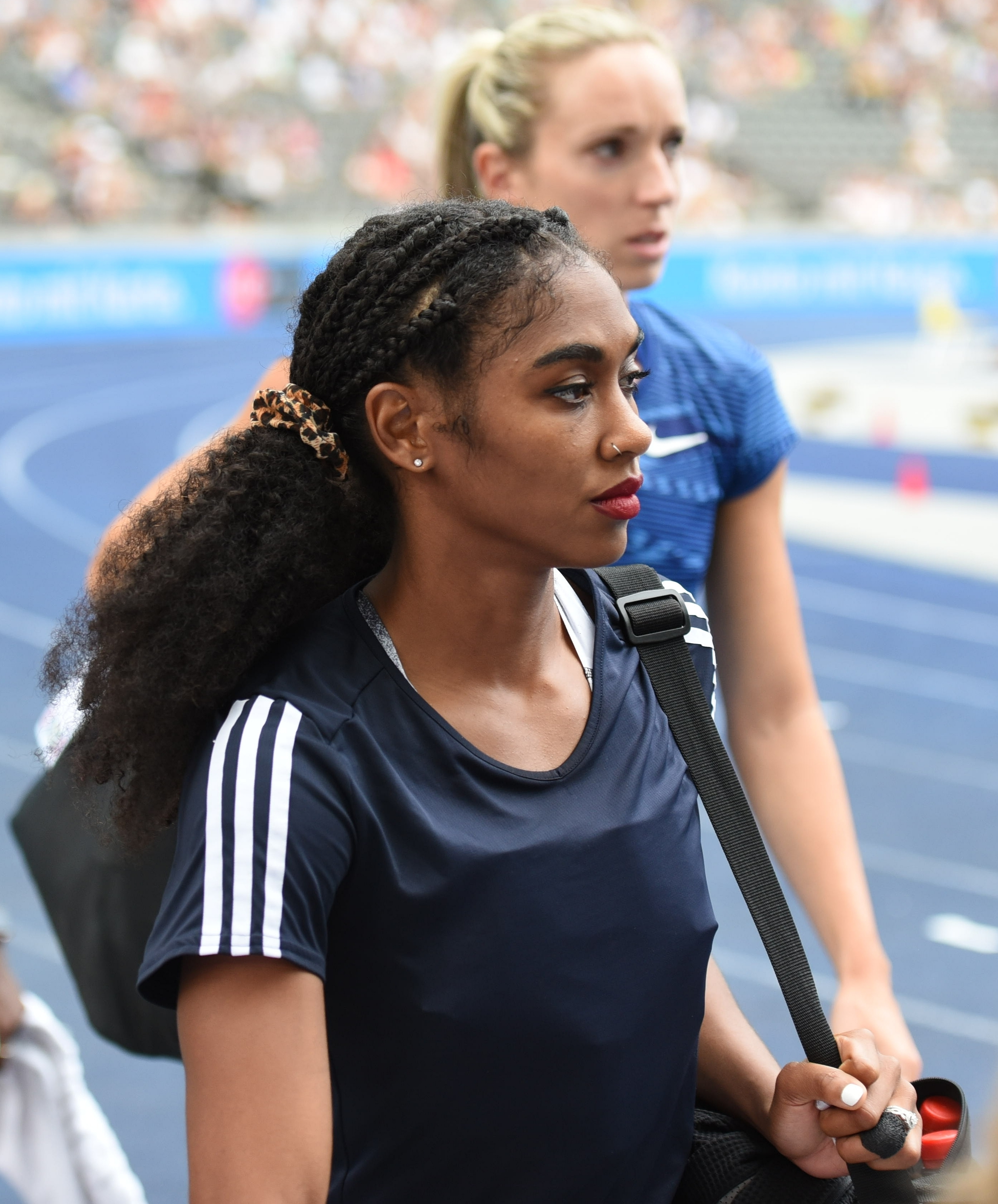
- Clemons at the 2019 ISTAF Berlin

Personal information
- Full name: Christina Ali Clemons
- Born: May 29, 1990 (age 36) Andrews AFB, Maryland, U.S.
- Education: Ohio State
- Height: 5 ft 4 in (163 cm)
- Weight: 117 lb (53 kg)

Sport
- Sport: Track and Field
- Event: 100 metres hurdles

Achievements and titles
- Personal bests: 100 m hurdles: 12.51 s (Eugene 2021); Indoors; 60 m hurdles: 7.73 (Albuquerque 2018)
Medal record
Women's athletics
Representing the United States
IAAF World Relays
Gold medal – first place	2019 Yokohama	Shuttle hurdle relay
World Indoor Championships
Silver medal – second place	2018 Birmingham	60 m hurdles
Universiade
Bronze medal – third place	2011 Shenzhen	100 m hurdles

Christina Clemons (née Manning; born May 29, 1990) is an American track and field athlete who specializes in the 100 meters hurdles. She won the silver medal in the 60 metres hurdles at the 2018 World Indoor Championships. Her time of 7.73 in the event is tied for the fifth-fastest time in history and 0.05 seconds off the world record.

== Early life ==
Clemons, then Manning, attended Westlake High School in Waldorf, MD.

== College athletics ==
Clemons, then Manning, attended Ohio State University in Columbus, Ohio. There, she was a 2 time NCAA champion, 10 time Big Ten Champion, 11 time All American, and the 2012 Big Ten Athlete of the Year. Clemons still holds the school records in four separate events: the 60m dash (7.23), 60m hurdles (7.91), 100m hurdles (12.68) and the 4×100m relay (43.70). The four-time Big Ten Track Athlete of the Year also still owns Big Ten championship meet records in the 60m hurdles with a 7.95 and the aforementioned 43.70 is still the fastest to be run by a relay team at the B1G meet.

Clemons was an instrumental cog in helping Ohio State collect three team titles at the Big Ten Championships over the course of her career. She was a member of the 2011 indoor, 2011 outdoor and 2012 outdoor conference winning teams, the first three in program history. While in college, Clemons competed in the 2012 Olympic trials, finishing 5th, ahead of the 2016 Olympic Champion and the 2019 World Champion. Clemons is the most decorated female athlete in the history of the Ohio State University.

== Professional career ==
Upon graduating the Ohio State University and before competing in her first season as a professional athlete, Clemons had a complete rupture of her right Achilles with no warning and no prior symptoms. While many assured her this was a career-ending injury, four years later, in 2017, Clemons returned, claiming victories all of the indoor season. She won the 60m hurdles at the 2017 Birmingham Indoor Grand Prix over Olympic Champion Sally Pearson. Outdoor, Clemons claimed a top spot on the 2017 Iaaf World Championship team for the 100 meter hurdles, the most challenging team to make in the United States. At the 2017 World Championships in Athletics Clemons won her heat and her semifinal to reach the finals. In the final, she missed her first potential international medal by two one-thousandths of a second and finished one one-thousandth of a second behind world record holder Kendra Harrison. She went on to set a personal record of 12.54 in Berlin two weeks after world championships. Clemons fought her way to 4th in the world her first year back healthy.

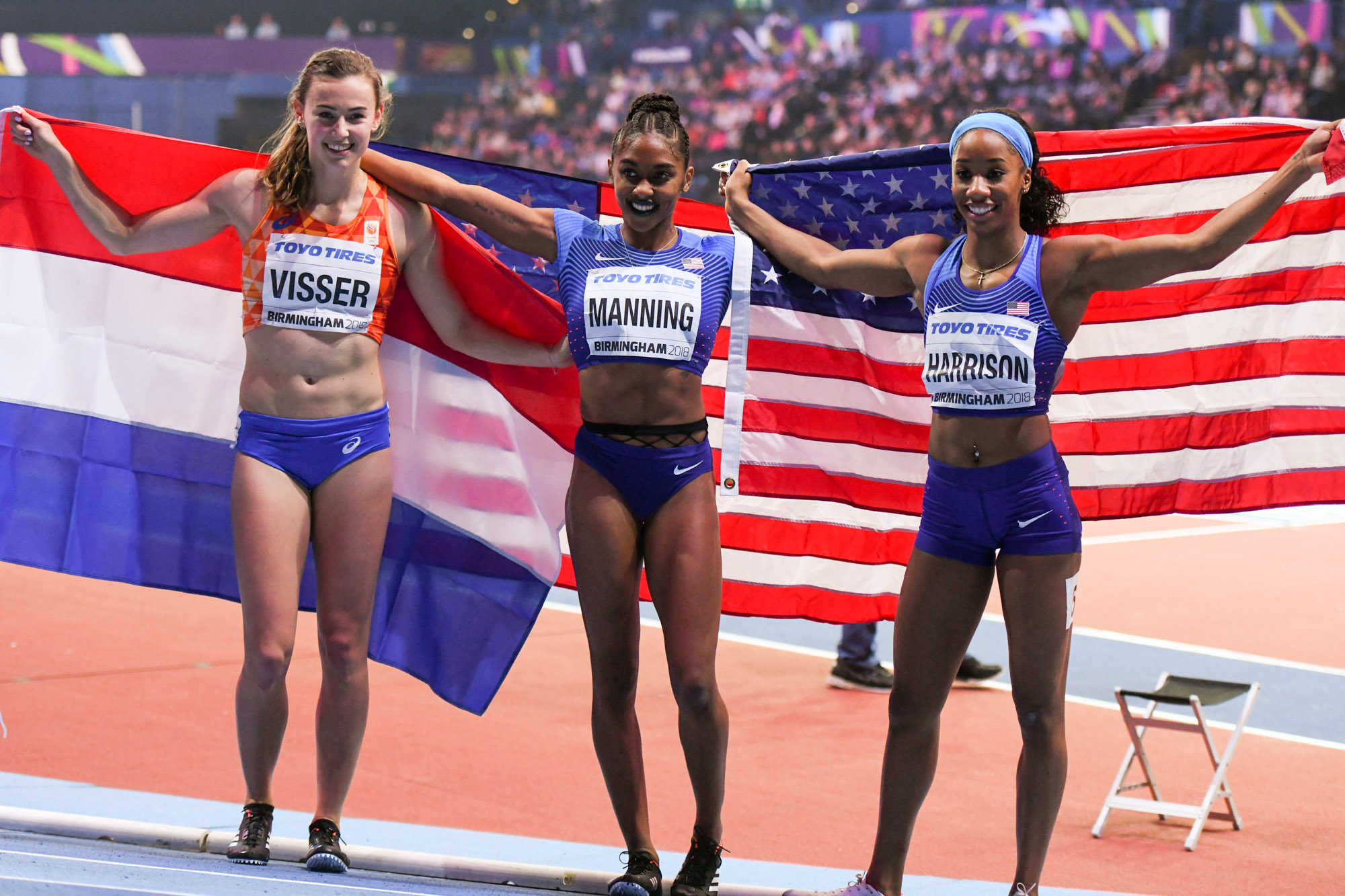
Clemons, then Manning, (C) celebrates her 60 m hurdles silver at the 2018 World Indoor Championships.

The following year, Clemons missed making the team for the 2018 IAAF World Indoor Championships by 0.01 seconds behind Sharika Nelvis and world record holder Kendra Harrison. Two weeks later, Clemons went on to win the 2018 World indoor tour in Madrid in a time of 7.77, ahead of USA champion Sharika Nelvis, giving her an automatic spot on the world indoor team. On March 3, 2018, Christina Clemons won her first international medal and became the 2018 world indoor silver medalist. Outdoor of 2018 without a team to be made, she competed nationally and won silver for the 100m hurdles at USATF championships behind Harrison.

In 2019, Clemons had the best season of her career finishing top 3 in every competition and winning her first diamond league race in Oslo, Norway. At USA Championships, she won her heat and placed second in the semi-finals behind world record holder Harrison. In the final of the USA Championships, Clemons clipped hurdle 6 causing her to lose her place of 3rd, a guaranteed spot to the IAAF World Championships, falling to the end of the pack. She finished her 2019 season at 6th in the world.

She returned in 2020 winning the world indoor tour ahead of 2019 World Champion Nia Ali, giving her an automatic spot to the IAAF world indoor championships in Nanjing, China. Clemons is the only hurdler in history to win the IAAF world tour consecutively.

In August 2023, Christina Clemons moved to Austin, Texas to train in Tonja Buford-Bailey training group.

In March, Christina Clemons placed 10th in the 2024 World Athletics Indoor Championships – Women's 60 metres hurdles in a time of 7.99 seconds.

=== Circuit performances ===
Grand Slam Track results
Slam	Race group	Event	Pl.	Time	Prize money
2025 Philadelphia Slam	Short hurdles	100 m hurdles	8th	12.96	US$10,000
2025 Philadelphia Slam	Short hurdles	100 m	8th	11.94	US$10,000
