= Aubrey Herring =

American track and field athlete (born 1978)

Personal information
- Born: September 19, 1978 (age 48) Oklahoma, United States

Sport
- Sport: Track and field
- Club: Indiana State Sycamores

Aubrey Herring (born September 19, 1978) is an American track and field athlete.

Herring was born in Oklahoma and moved to Indianapolis, Indiana, in 1994 where he attended Warren Central High School and graduated in 1996. Herring was the 1996 Indiana State Champion in the 110m high hurdles and runner-up in the 330M hurdles. After high school he attended Indiana State University (ISU) where he was recruited as a 110m hurdler by coach John McNichols.

Herring was a seven-time NCAA All-American while at ISU and was the 2001 NCAA Indoor Champion for 60 meter hurdles in Fayetteville, Arkansas.

He was part of the 4x120yd world record shuttle hurdle relay team (David Oliver, Joel Brown, Aries Merritt) that ran 53.31 at the 2008 Penn Relay Carnival.

In 2008, Herring ran a personal best in the 110m hurdles of 13.30 at the International Friendship and Freedom Games in Greensboro, North Carolina. As of January 2014, he lives and trains in Orlando, Florida, with the 2008 USA Indoor Champion David Oliver and the 2005 USA Indoor Champion Joel Brown under the tutelage of Brooks Johnson.
