= Joel Brown (hurdler) =

American hurdler

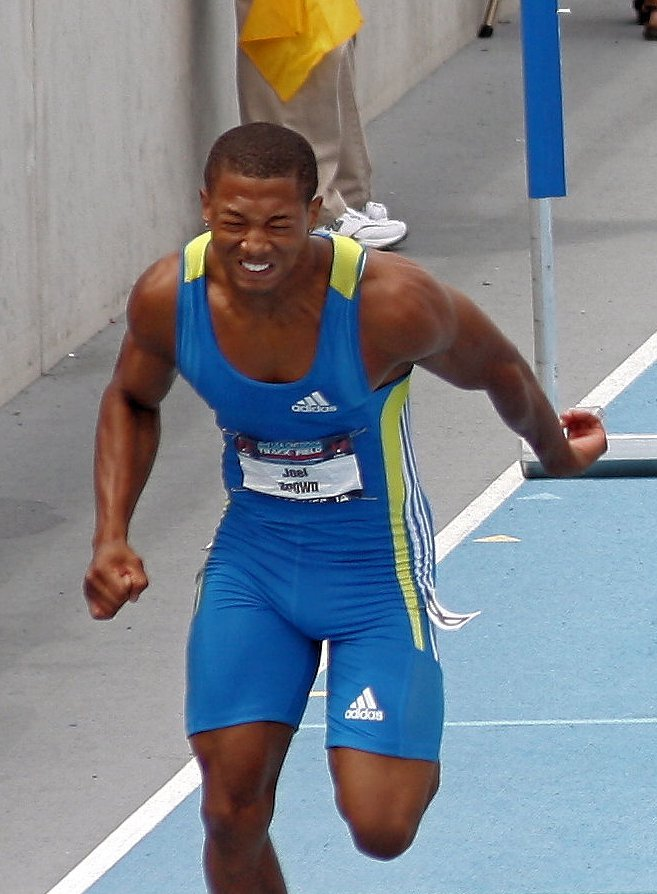
Joel Brown

Joel Brown (born January 31, 1980, in Baltimore, Maryland) is an American hurdler.

He finished sixth at the 2005 World Championships and seventh at the 2005 World Athletics Final.

Comprises 1/4 of the World Record Shuttle Hurdle Relay team (Aubrey Herring, David Oliver, Aries Merritt) that ran 53.31 at the 2008 Penn Relay Carnival

His personal best time is 13.20 seconds, achieved on June 9, 2011, at the Bislett Games.

Brown was managed for 9 years by his agent and former high school coach Mark Pryor of World Express Sports Management

Brown was an All-American hurdler for the Ohio State Buckeyes track and field team, finishing 3rd in the 110 m hurdles at the 2004 NCAA Division I Outdoor Track and Field Championships.
