= Vashti Thomas =

American athletics competitor (born 1990)

Personal information
- Born: April 21, 1990 (age 36) San Jose, California, United States

Sport
- Sport: Athletics
- Event(s): 100 m hurdles, long jump

Achievements and titles
- Personal best(s): 100 m hurdles: 12.61 (2013) long jump: 6.97 m (2012)
Medal record
Women's athletics
Representing United States
Universiade
Gold medal – first place	2013 Kazan	100 m hurdles

Vashti Thomas (21 April 1990) is a track and field athlete who competes in the 100 metre hurdles and long jump. Thomas won the 100 metres hurdles at the 2013 World University Games in Kazan, Russia, clocking 12.61 seconds, a games record.

Thomas competed for the Texas A&M Aggies track and field and Academy of Art Urban Knights track and field teams in the NCAA.

Thomas, whose father is of Panamanian descent, represented Panama at the 2014 Central American and Caribbean Games in Xalapa, Mexico, where she finished 7th in the long jump with a leap of 5.87m.

== Statistics ==
=== Personal bests ===
Event	Mark	Competition	Venue	Date
100 metres	11.63		Joensuu, Finland	24 July 2014
200 metres	22.75		Pueblo, Colorado, US	25 May 2013
100 metre hurdles	12.61	World University Games	Kazan, Russia	10 July 2013
Long Jump	6.97 m	United States Olympic Trials	Eugene, Oregon, US	29 June 2012
Triple Jump	13.14 m		Gilroy, California, US	23 May 2008

=== International competitions ===
Year	Competition	Venue	Position	Event	Notes
Representing United States
2013	World University Games	Kazan, Russia	1st	100 metre hurdles	12.61
Representing Panama
2014	Central American and Caribbean Games	Xalapa, Mexico	7th	Long jump	5.87 m
