= Queen Claye =

American hurdler and sprinter

Queen Harrison
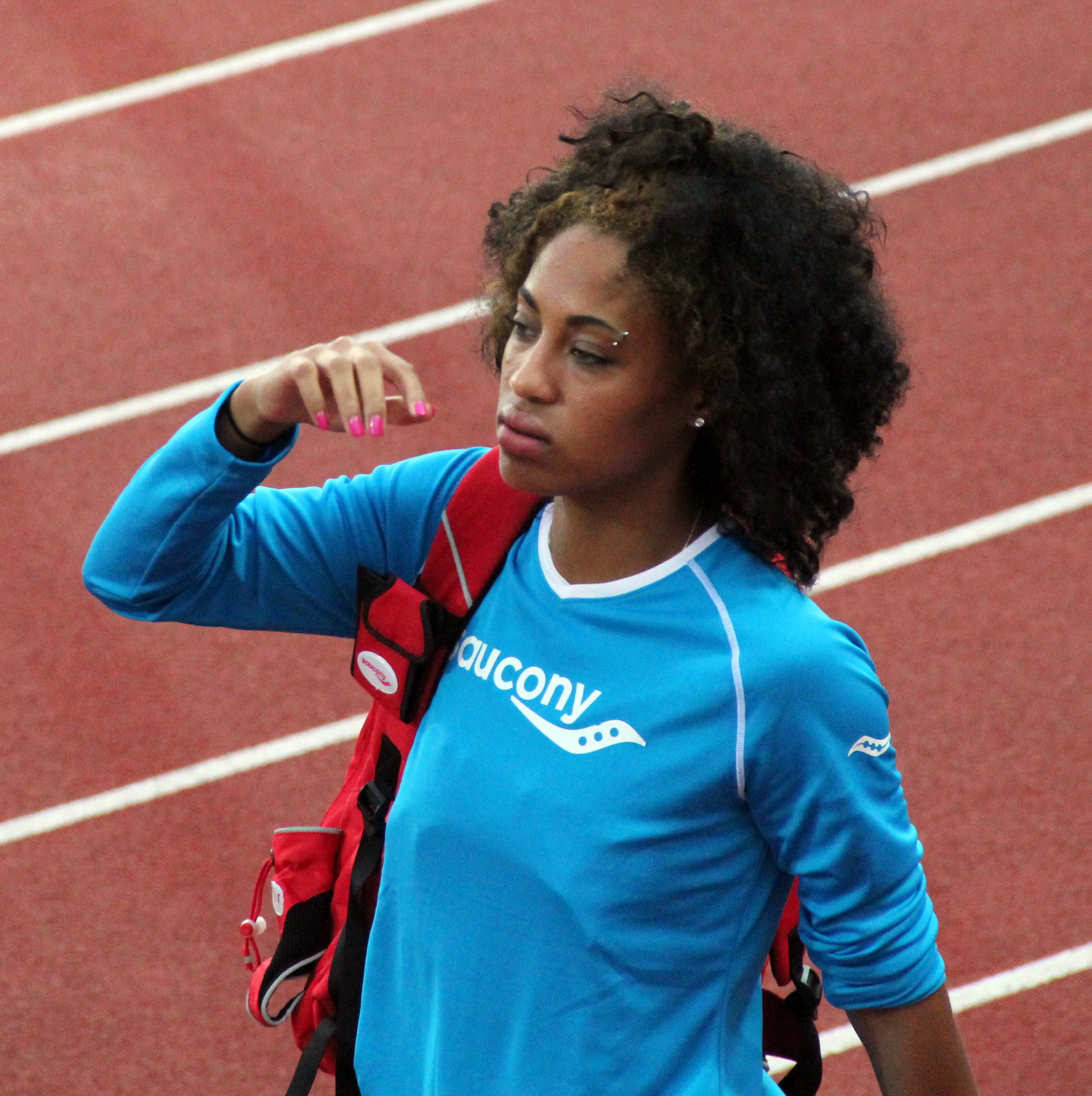
- Harrison at the 2011 Bislett Games

Personal information
- Born: Queen Quedith Harrison; September 10, 1988 (age 38) Loch Sheldrake, New York, U.S.
- Home town: Richmond, Virginia, U.S.
- Height: 5 ft 7 in (170 cm)
- Weight: 130 lb (59 kg)
- Spouse: Will Claye

Sport
- Sport: Track and field
- Event: 100 metres hurdles
- College team: Virginia Tech
- Coached by: Lawrence Johnson

Achievements and titles
- Personal bests: 100mH: 12.43 (Des Moines 2013); 400mH: 54.55 (Eugene2010); Indoors; 60mH: 7.83 Portland 2016)
Medal record
Pan American Games
Gold medal – first place	2015 Toronto	100 m hurdles
Pan American Junior Championships
Gold medal – first place	2007 São Paulo	400 m hurdles
Silver medal – second place	2007 São Paulo	100 m hurdles
World Relays
Gold medal – first place	2019 Yokohama	Mixed shuttle relay
- Updated on 11 October 2024

Queen Quedith Claye née Harrison (born September 10, 1988) is an American hurdler and sprinter who competed in the 400 metres hurdles at the 2008 Summer Olympics. She was a six-time collegiate All-American at Virginia Tech where she was elected to its sports hall of fame. Queen is a meet director for Virginia's best high school meet, the Queen Track Classic - VHSL meet hosted in Richmond, Virginia started in 2017.

== Career ==
Born in Loch Sheldrake, New York, Harrison attended Hermitage High School in Richmond, Virginia, where she competed in events including hurdling, long jump, and triple jump.

She went on to attend Virginia Tech. She set a school record of 55.81 in the 400 meter hurdles while placing third at the 2007 NCAA Championship. Harrison made NCAA history in 2010 by becoming the first woman to ever win both the 100m and 400m hurdles titles at the NCAA Outdoor Championships. She also won the 60m hurdle title at the 2009 NCAA Indoor Championships making her a 3-time national champ while at Virginia Tech. Queen Harrison set an ACC record in the 400 meter hurdles.

Harrison placed second at the 400 meter hurdles at 2008 U.S. Olympic Trials with a time of 54.60. Harrison became the first track and field athlete from Virginia Tech to compete at the Olympics.

At the 2008 Summer Olympics, Harrison was eliminated in the 400 meter hurdles semifinals after finishing with a time of 55.88 seconds.

On December 16, 2010, Queen Harrison won The Bowerman, the "Heisman of Track and Field".

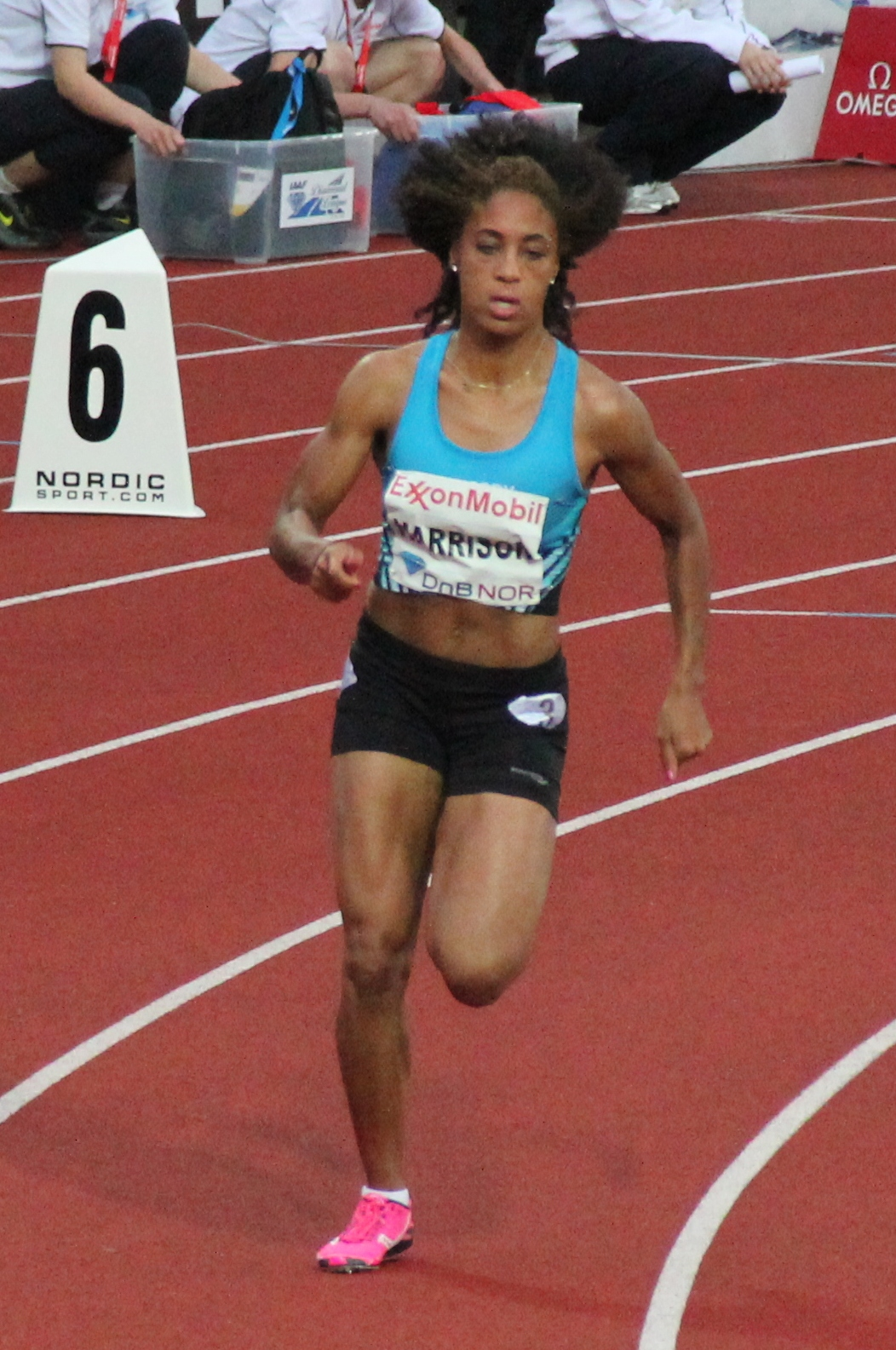
Queen Harrison at the Bislett Games 2011.

She qualified to the 2011 World Championships in Athletics, but did not make it out of the semi-final round.

At the 2012 Olympic trials, she narrowly missed qualifying for the finals in the shorter 100 meters hurdles. At 400 hurdles, was the slowest time qualifier into the semis-final round and ran even slower in that semi-final. Since 2012, her IAAF profile shows no results in the longer race. Instead she has focused her efforts into the shorter race.

She finished second at the 2013 USA Outdoor Track and Field Championships setting her personal best at 12.43. That ranks her tied for the 16th best performer on the all-time list. That qualified her to the 2013 World Championships in Athletics in the new event. She finished fifth in the final.

She placed fourth at the 2015 National Championships from which she was selected to compete at the 2015 Pan American Games where she won the gold medal.

Queen placed fourth in the 100 meter hurdles in 12.57 at the 2016 United States Olympic Trials (track and field) on July 8.

== Personal life ==
Queen Quedith Claye nee Harrison was born in Loch Sheldrake, New York, to William Harrison and Alicia Wingate, she is the 5th child of Alicia. Her siblings are named Goldin, Harrison, Victory, King Master, Princess, Empress, Muun, Zuequal, and Graceful. Queen has 14 half-siblings via her father. Queen was raised a member of The Nation of Gods and Earth, a sect of the Nation of Islam.

Her father, William Harrison, served as a paratrooper, He spent 10 years in the Fort Dix federal correctional institution after being convicted of possession and intent to distribute 5 lbs of marijuana and 22 lbs of cocaine Her mother, Alicia Wingate, served 21 months after a 1998 conviction of Felony Withholding Information.

Queen married fellow US athlete Will Claye in October 2018. Claye proposed immediately after winning the silver medal in the triple jump at the 2016 Olympic Games in Rio.

Awards
Preceded by (United States) Jenny Barringer	The Bowerman (Women's Winner); 2010	Succeeded by (United States) Jessica Beard
